= Michael Sullivan =

Michael Sullivan (or variants) may refer to:

== Politicians ==
- Michael Sullivan (U.S. attorney) (born 1954), former Boston-based federal prosecutor and acting ATF Director
- Michael Sullivan (Canadian senator) (1838–1915), Canadian senator
- Michael Sullivan (MP) (1809–1878), UK MP for the Irish constituency of Kilkenny, 1847–1865
- Michael D. Sullivan (judge) (1938–2000), justice of the Supreme Court of Mississippi
- Michael J. Sullivan (mayor) (born 1956), mayor of Lawrence, Massachusetts
- Michael J. Sullivan (Wyoming politician) (born 1943), Wyoming labor commissioner
- Michael A. Sullivan (politician) (born 1959), former mayor of Cambridge, Massachusetts
- Michael A. Sullivan (judge) (1879–1937), chief justice of the Massachusetts Land Court
- Michael T. Sullivan (1924–2007), American lawyer and judge in Wisconsin
- Michael Quinn Sullivan (born 1970), president of Empower Texans and Texans for Fiscal Responsibility
- Michael S. Sullivan (1876–1929), Newfoundland, Canada, politician
- Mike Sullivan (Wyoming politician) (born 1939), governor of Wyoming and former U.S. ambassador to Ireland
- Mike Sullivan (Canadian politician) (born 1952), Canadian member of parliament

== Sportsmen ==
- Michael Sullivan (rugby league) (born 1980), Australian rugby league footballer
- Michael Sullivan (sport shooter) (born 1942), British sport shooter
- Mike Sullivan (American football coach) (born 1967), American football coach (Pittsburgh Steelers)
- Mike Sullivan (golfer) (born 1955), winner of the 1994 B.C. Open
- Mike Sullivan (handballer) (born 1963), American Olympic handballer
- Mike Sullivan (ice hockey) (born 1968), American ice hockey coach and former National Hockey League player
- Mike Sullivan (offensive lineman) (born 1967), American football coach and former player
- Mike Sullivan (outfielder) (1860–1929), Major League Baseball player
- Mike Sullivan (pitcher) (1866–1906), Major League Baseball pitcher
- Mike Sullivan (wrestler) (born 1974), professional wrestler
- Mike "Twin" Sullivan (1878–1937), American boxer
- Michael Sullivan (soccer, born 2003), American soccer player

== Musicians ==
- Michael Sullivan (singer-songwriter) (born 1950), Brazilian singer-songwriter
- Mike Sullivan, guitarist for the band Russian Circles
- Michael Sullivan, member of the band Redcar

== Others ==
- Michael Sullivan (art historian) (1916–2013), emeritus fellow of St Catherine's College, Oxford
- Michael Sullivan (stonemason) (died 1928), American stonemason who built various historical structures in Casa Grande, Arizona
- Michael Sullivan (unionist), American labor union leader
- Michael J. Sullivan (author) (born 1961), author of The Riyria Revelations, VA
- Michael D. Sullivan (journalist), South East Asia correspondent for National Public Radio
- Michael G. Sullivan (born 1958), Canadian wildlife biologist
- Michael Sullivan (filmmaker), American film and television writer, director and producer
- Michael P. Sullivan (born 1934), American attorney and former president of Dairy Queen
- Mike Sullivan (pilot) (born 1970), NASA test pilot
- Mike Sullivan, co-developer of XenForo

== See also ==
- Mick Sullivan (1934–2016), English rugby league footballer
- Michael O'Sullivan (disambiguation)
