= Michael O'Sullivan =

Michael O'Sullivan may refer to:

== Individual ==
- Michael O'Sullivan (actor) (1934–1971), American actor
- Michael O'Sullivan (cricketer) (born 1973), former English cricketer
- Michael O'Sullivan (footballer) (born 1962), former Australian rules footballer
- Michael O'Sullivan (hurler) (born 1990), Irish hurler who played for Cork
- Michael O'Sullivan (jockey) (2000–2025), Irish jockey
- Michael O'Sullivan (poet) (born 1959), Irish poet
- Michael O'Sullivan (politician) (1784–1839), Lower Canada lawyer, militia officer, politician and judge
- Michael O'Sullivan (soccer) (born 1995), English-American soccer player
- Sir Michael Neil O'Sullivan (1900–1968), Australian politician and lawyer
- Mickey O'Sullivan (born 1952), Irish retired Gaelic football manager, selector, and former player

== Fictional ==
- Michael O'Sullivan, character in Road to Perdition

== See also ==
- Michael Sullivan (disambiguation)
- O'Sullivan (surname)
