= Claude Julien (ice hockey) =

Canadian ice hockey player and coach

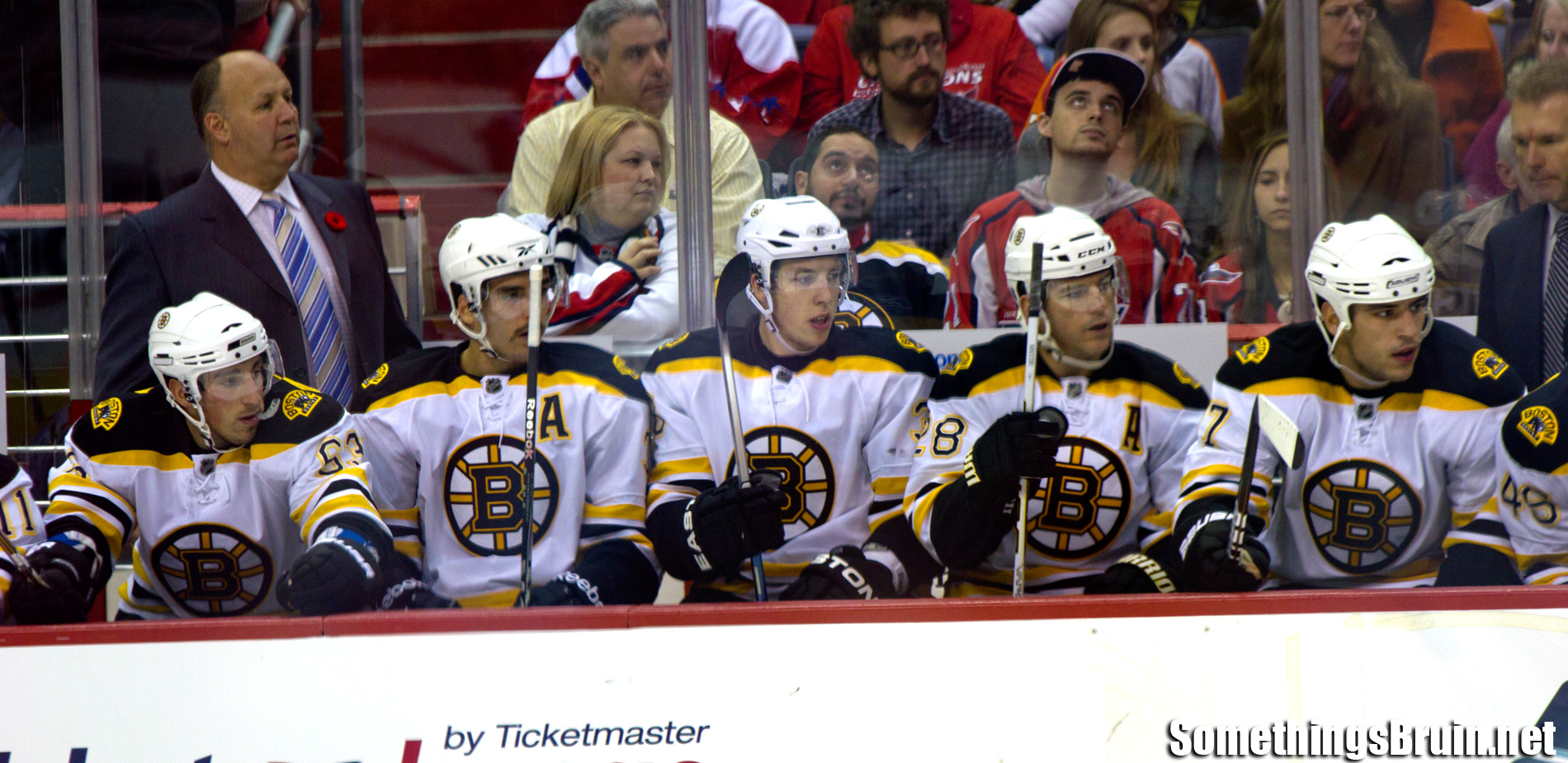
- Claude Julien in 2010
- Born: April 23, 1960 (age 66) Blind River, Ontario, Canada
- Height: 6 ft 0 in (183 cm)
- Weight: 195 lb (88 kg; 13 st 13 lb)
- Position: Defence
- Shot: Right
- Played for: Quebec Nordiques
- Coached for: Montreal Canadiens; New Jersey Devils; Boston Bruins
- NHL draft: Undrafted
- Playing career: 1980–1992
- Coaching career: 1996–present

Claude Julien (born April 23, 1960) is a Canadian professional ice hockey coach and former player. He is currently an assistant coach of the St. Louis Blues of the National Hockey League (NHL). Before his firing by the Boston Bruins in 2017, he was the longest tenured head coach in the NHL. He had previously served as head coach of the New Jersey Devils in the NHL, as well as in the American Hockey League (AHL) with the Hamilton Bulldogs. In 2011, he coached the Bruins to the Stanley Cup Final, against the Vancouver Canucks, winning in seven games, guiding Boston to their sixth franchise Stanley Cup title. In 2013, he brought Boston to another Stanley Cup Final; however, they lost the series to the Chicago Blackhawks in six games.

Julien has also served as assistant and head coach of the Canadian National Team.

== Playing career ==
As a youth, Julien played in the 1972 and 1973 Quebec International Pee-Wee Hockey Tournaments with a minor ice hockey team from Gloucester, Ontario.

Julien was an NHL defenceman for the Quebec Nordiques in the 1984–85 and 1985–86 seasons.

Before playing in the NHL, Julien spent six years in the Ontario Hockey League (OHL) with the Oshawa Generals and Windsor Spitfires. Additionally, he has also played in the Central Hockey League (CHL) for the Salt Lake Golden Eagles; in the International Hockey League (IHL) for the Kansas City Blades and the Milwaukee Admirals; and in the AHL for the Fredericton Express, Baltimore Skipjacks, Halifax Citadels and Moncton Hawks.

=== Career statistics ===
			Regular season					Playoffs
Season	Team	League	GP	G	A	Pts	PIM	GP	G	A	Pts	PIM
1977–78	Newmarket Flyers	OPJHL	45	18	26	44	137	—	—	—	—	—
1977–78	Oshawa Generals	OMJHL	11	0	5	5	14	2	0	0	0	2
1978–79	Oshawa Generals	OMJHL	5	0	2	2	12	—	—	—	—	—
1978–79	Windsor Spitfires	OMJHL	40	6	20	26	69	—	—	—	—	—
1979–80	Windsor Spitfires	OMJHL	68	14	37	51	148	16	5	11	16	23
1980–81	Windsor Spitfires	OHL	3	1	2	3	21	—	—	—	—	—
1980–81	Port Huron Flags	IHL	77	15	40	55	153	4	1	1	2	4
1981–82	Salt Lake Golden Eagles	CHL	70	4	18	22	134	5	1	4	5	0
1982–83	Salt Lake Golden Eagles	CHL	76	14	47	61	176	6	3	3	6	16
1983–84	Milwaukee Admirals	IHL	5	0	3	3	2	—	—	—	—	—
1983–84	Fredericton Express	AHL	57	7	22	29	58	7	0	4	4	6
1984–85	Quebec Nordiques	NHL	1	0	0	0	0	—	—	—	—	—
1984–85	Fredericton Express	AHL	77	6	28	34	97	6	2	4	6	13
1985–86	Quebec Nordiques	NHL	13	0	1	1	25	—	—	—	—	—
1985–86	Fredericton Express	AHL	49	3	18	21	74	6	1	4	5	19
1986–87	Fredericton Express	AHL	17	1	6	7	22	—	—	—	—	—
1986–87	Français Volants	FRA	36	15	50	65	—	—	—	—	—	—
1987–88	Baltimore Skipjacks	AHL	30	6	14	20	22	—	—	—	—	—
1987–88	Fredericton Express	AHL	35	1	14	15	52	13	1	3	4	30
1988–89	Halifax Citadels	AHL	79	8	52	60	72	4	0	2	2	4
1989–90	Halifax Citadels	AHL	77	6	37	43	65	4	0	1	1	7
1990–91	Kansas City Blades	IHL	54	7	16	23	43	—	—	—	—	—
1991–92	Moncton Hawks	AHL	48	2	15	17	10	4	0	1	1	4
IHL totals			136	22	59	81	198	4	1	1	2	4
CHL totals			148	18	65	83	310	11	4	7	11	16
AHL totals			469	40	206	246	472	44	9	14	23	83
NHL totals			14	0	1	1	25	—	—	—	—	—

== Coaching career ==
=== QMJHL coaching career ===
Julien began his professional coaching career in the Quebec Major Junior Hockey League (QMJHL) for the Hull Olympiques, with whom he won the Memorial Cup in 1997. From 2000 to 2003, he served as head coach for the AHL's Hamilton Bulldogs, the top minor league affiliate of the NHL's Montreal Canadiens.

In 2000, Julien won a bronze medal as the head coach of Canadian junior team. He also served as an assistant coach to Marc Habscheid at the 2006 Men's World Ice Hockey Championships.

=== NHL coaching career ===
==== Montreal Canadiens and New Jersey Devils ====
On January 17, 2003, Julien became head coach of the Montreal Canadiens. In 2003–04, his first full season as an NHL head coach, he led Montreal to a 93-point performance (41–30–7–4 record) and the second round of the 2004 Stanley Cup playoffs. He was eventually fired and replaced by General Manager Bob Gainey on January 14, 2006. Julien accumulated a record of 72–62–10–15 during his three seasons with the Canadiens.

Julien was then announced as the head coach of the New Jersey Devils on June 13, 2006, becoming the 15th head coach in Devils history. On October 6, 2006, he won his first game as Devils head coach with a 4–0 win against the defending Stanley Cup champions, the Carolina Hurricanes. On November 4, Julien won in his first return to Montreal as the Devils defeated the Canadiens, 2–1. On April 2, 2007, Devils general manager Lou Lamoriello abruptly fired Julien with three games to go in the season. This was despite the Devils having a 47–24–8 record, which at the time was leading the Atlantic Division and tied for the second-best record in the Eastern Conference. They were also on their way to setting a franchise record for wins in a season. Lamoriello said that despite the team's stellar record, he did not feel Julien had it ready for the 2007 playoffs. Lamoriello named himself interim head coach for the rest of the season, the second straight season in which Lamoriello left the front office to coach the Devils at the end of the season. Despite the change, the Devils went on to lose in the Eastern Conference Semifinal to the Ottawa Senators.

==== Boston Bruins ====
On June 22, 2007, it was confirmed by various sports websites that Julien had been named as the 28th head coach of the Boston Bruins. In his first season as Boston's coach, he led the team back to the playoffs. His team struggled with consistency throughout the season, but this was in large part due to the many injuries that plagued the Bruins throughout the 2007–08 season. Most notably, forward Patrice Bergeron and goaltender Manny Fernandez missed almost the entire season. The Bruins were defeated in the Eastern Conference Quarterfinals by his former team, Montreal, who were coached by Guy Carbonneau, Julien's permanent replacement as head coach, in seven games.

On February 17, 2009, Julien coached his 200th win as an NHL head coach, a 5–1 Bruins road game victory over the Carolina Hurricanes. On June 18, 2009, at the end of the 2008–09 season, he was awarded the Jack Adams Award as coach of the year.

In the 2010 playoffs, the Bruins became only the third NHL team to lose a best-of-seven series after being up three games to none when they were eliminated by the Philadelphia Flyers (the other two teams were the 1942 Detroit Red Wings and the 1975 Pittsburgh Penguins). Boston held a 3–0 lead in game seven, but the Flyers tied and eventually won the game, 4–3. Injuries to star Bruins forwards David Krejčí (broken wrist), Marco Sturm (torn ACL) and Marc Savard (concussion), as well as defenceman Dennis Seidenberg (wrist) and an undisclosed injury to former Vezina-winning goaltender Tim Thomas (hip), were factors in the defeat.

The 2010–11 season saw Julien coach the Bruins to the third seed in the playoffs and a first-round matchup against the rival Montreal Canadiens. After dropping the first two games at home, Julien made some lineup adjustments and helped his team come back to win the series in seven games. In the Eastern Conference Semifinals, the Bruins got a chance to redeem themselves from the previous year in a much-anticipated series against the Philadelphia Flyers. After winning game one, 7–3, they went on to sweep the Flyers out of the playoffs in four games. In the Conference Finals, the Bruins faced off against the Tampa Bay Lightning for their first chance at a Stanley Cup since 1990. The Bruins came out victorious in their second seven-game series of the playoffs, including wins of 6–5, 2–1, and a penalty-less 1–0 win in game seven.

The team's victory set up a Stanley Cup Final against the number one seed Vancouver Canucks, who possessed the best statistics in offence, defence, goaltending, power play, and special teams in the NHL. After a hard-fought game one, the Canucks scored the first goal of the game with just 18.5 seconds remaining in the third period, taking the series opener, 1–0. The Bruins, looking to rebound in game two, skated to a tie with Vancouver after regulation before a costly mistake by Boston captain Zdeno Chára after just 11 seconds of overtime allowed the Canucks to score the game-winning goal to take a 2–0 series lead. Back in Boston, after a rough first period in which the Bruins lost Nathan Horton to an illegal, concussive hit by Vancouver defenceman Aaron Rome, Boston exploded for four goals in the second period and four more in the third to complete an 8–1 blowout victory. The Bruins followed up that big win with another decisive victory, this time romping 4–0 over the Canucks while chasing goaltender Roberto Luongo, who had surrendered 12 goals in five periods during the two games in Boston. On June 15, 2011, the Bruins won their sixth Stanley Cup championship with a 4–0 victory in game seven in Vancouver.

Entering the 2011 playoffs, Julien's career playoff record in Game 7s was 1–3, with the three losses all coming during his tenure as Boston coach, against Montreal in 2008, Carolina in 2009, and Philadelphia in 2010. His one game seven victory came in 2004 as Montreal's coach, ironically against Boston. With the 2011 playoff game seven wins against Montreal, Tampa Bay, and Vancouver, he thus improved his record to 4–3. Additionally, in the 2011 playoffs, Julien (now with 33 wins) passed Don Cherry (31 wins) for the most playoff wins by a Boston Bruins coach.

During the 2011–12 regular season, Julien reached multiple personal coaching milestones. On December 17, 2011, he collected his 200th regular season win as Boston's coach in a 6–0 whitewash defeat of the Eastern Conference-leading Philadelphia Flyers. The win completed a Bruin 41-day journey from the absolute bottom of the Eastern Conference to tied for first place. On January 29, 2012, Julien (and his Bruin bench staff) coached Team Chara to a 12–9 win over Team Alfredsson in the 2012 NHL All-Star Game in Ottawa. It was his second appearance and second win as an All-Star Game coach, having also appeared in the 2009 Game. On March 19, 2012, he coached his 400th game behind the Bruin bench, an 8–0 win over the Toronto Maple Leafs. The win completed a perfect 6–0 sweep of the season series with the Maple Leafs.

The 2012 postseason, however, would not be as memorable for Julien's defending Cup champion Bruins, as they fell in the first round to the Washington Capitals and their upstart rookie goaltender Braden Holtby in seven games. The series was the closest, most evenly fought series in NHL history, with all seven games (including four overtime games) being one-goal decisions. After the defeat, Julien's playoff game seven record fell to 4–4. Despite the early exit for Boston in the playoffs, the Bruins signed Julien to a new, multi-year contract extension.

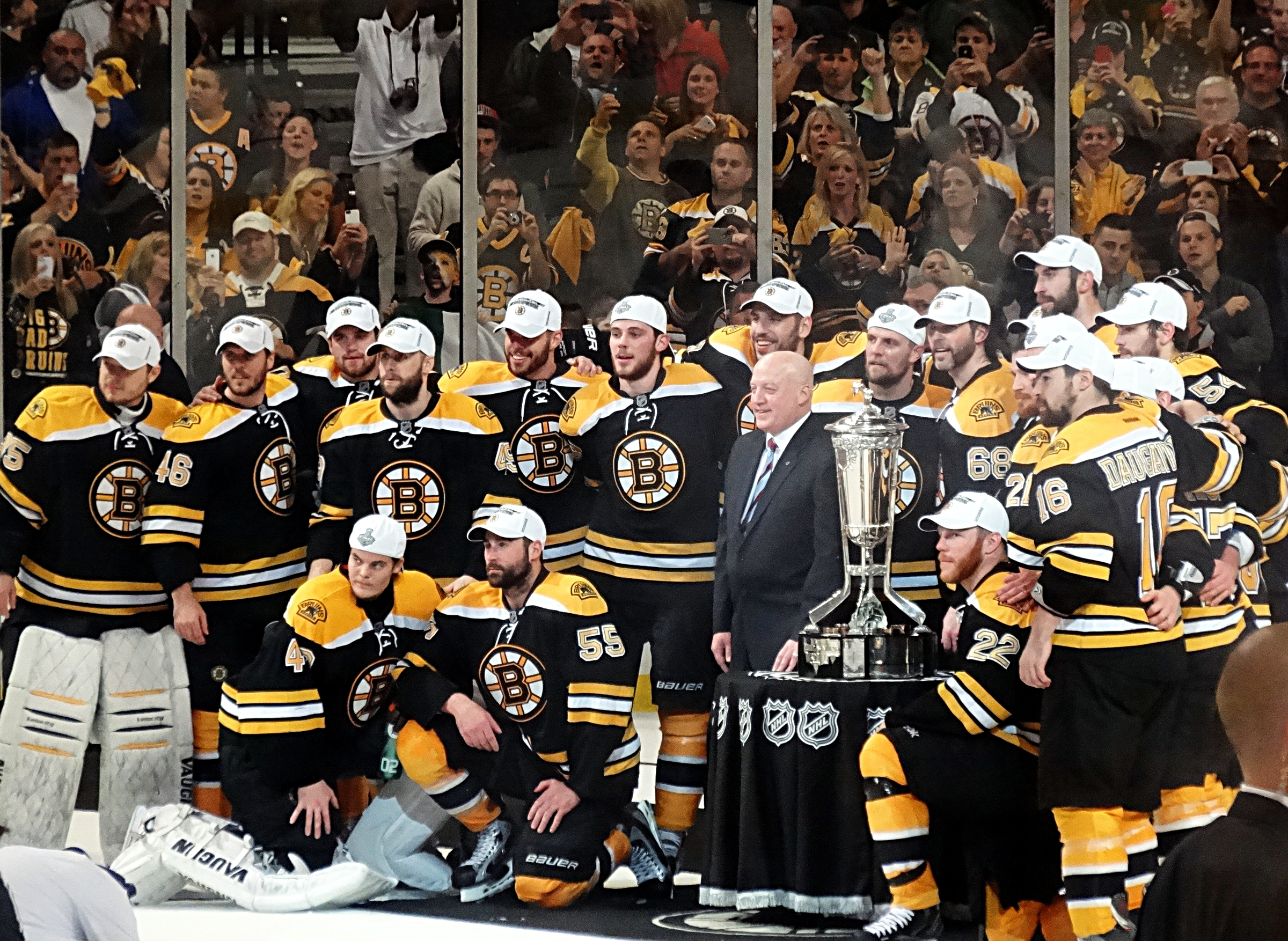
Julien and Bruins with the Prince of Wales Trophy in 2013

In the lockout-shortened 2012–13 season, Julien led his team to their second Stanley Cup Final in three years. In the first round, they defeated the Toronto Maple Leafs in seven games, where in the deciding game seven, they came back from a 1–4 deficit to win 5–4 in overtime, the first time in NHL playoff history in which a team trailing by three goals in the third period went on to win game seven to take the series. The Bruins then eliminated the New York Rangers in five games. Matched up against the Pittsburgh Penguins in the Eastern Conference Finals, who were the regular season Conference champions, the Bruins swept them in four games, which included two shutouts of the normally high-scoring Penguins. In the Cup Finals, however, the Bruins lost to the first place Chicago Blackhawks in six games after failing to hold on to third-period leads in their Game 1 and game six losses.

In the 2013–14 regular season, the first under the League's new conference and division realignment, Julien's team won the Presidents' Trophy for the best regular season record in the NHL.

In the 2014–15 regular season, the Bruins failed to make the playoffs for the first time since Julien took over the role as Bruins head coach. On June 5, 2015, Don Sweeney, the Bruins' new general manager, confirmed that Julien and his staff would be staying on for the upcoming 2015–16 NHL regular season. During a six-game road trip for the Bruins as part of the team's 2015–16 season, on February 13, 2016, Julien was surprised to learn, after his Bruins team defeated the Minnesota Wild in a 4–2 road victory, that he had coached his 500th NHL winning game. Another achievement for Julien's career in coaching the Bruins would be earned less than a month later; as the result of Julien's coaching the Bruins to a 4–2 home ice win against the 2015 Stanley Cup champion Chicago Blackhawks on March 3, 2016, Julien won his 387th game for the Bruins, tying Hall of Fame member and Bruins co-founder Art Ross (who led the team on four separate stints ending in 1945) as the winningest coach in franchise history. Only four days later, on March 7, with a Bruins' 5–4 overtime road victory over the Florida Panthers, Julien won his 388th game as Bruins head coach, surpassing Ross as the winningest coach in team history.

On February 7, 2017, Julien was relieved of his coaching duties after leading the team with a 26–23–6 record. Julien ended his tenure in Boston with 419 regular-season victories.

==== Return to Montreal ====
On February 14, 2017, Julien was named the head coach of the Montreal Canadiens after Michel Therrien was relieved of his head coaching duties. This marks the second time in Canadiens franchise history Julien replaced Therrien, the first time being during the 2002–03 regular season.

On November 30, 2017, Julien won his 100th game as the Canadiens' coach with a 6–3 win against the Detroit Red Wings.

On August 12, 2020, following a loss to the Philadelphia Flyers in the Eastern Conference First Round, Julien experienced chest pains and was transferred to the hospital. Canadiens general manager Marc Bergevin stated that his chest pains had nothing to do with COVID-19. Kirk Muller, the associate head coach of the Canadiens, assumed the role of head coach for the rest of the first round of playoffs. On August 14, the Canadiens announced that Julien had a stent placed in one of his coronary arteries on August 13. It was also announced that he would be returning to Montreal to rest, and the chances of him being able to rejoin the team before the end of the first round were described by Bergevin as "very minimal".

On February 6, 2021, Julien won his 200th game as head coach of the Canadiens in a 2–1 win over the Ottawa Senators.

On February 24, 2021, Julien and associate coach Kirk Muller were fired by the Canadiens.

==== St. Louis Blues ====
On June 27, 2024, St. Louis Blues President of Hockey Operations and General Manager Doug Armstrong announced Julien would be an assistant coach for the team in the 2024–25 season.

=== Team Canada ===
Julien was also an assistant coach for the Canadian national team at the 2014 Winter Olympics, where he helped lead the team to a gold medal victory. He continued as assistant coach for the 2016 World Cup, where the team won the championship.

Julien was originally intended to be head coach of Team Canada for the 2022 Beijing Olympics. In January 2022, Julien slipped on the ice and fractured his ribs at a training camp in Switzerland. Jeremy Colliton coached the first game while Julien recovered from the injury.

== Personal life ==
Julien and his wife Karen have one daughter and one son. The family resides in Ottawa, Ontario. They previously resided in Red Bank, New Jersey and Lexington, Massachusetts. Julien was raised in the Orléans suburb of Ottawa. He is bilingual, speaking both French and English fluently.

== Head coaching record ==
Team	Year	Regular season							Postseason			
Team	Year	G	W	L	T	OTL	Pts	Finish	W	L	Win%	Result
MTL	2002–03	36	12	16	3	5	(77)	4th in Northeast	—	—	—	Missed playoffs
MTL	2003–04	82	41	30	7	4	93	4th in Northeast	4	7	.364	Lost in Conference semifinals (TBL)
MTL	2005–06	41	19	16	—	6	(93)	(fired)	—	—	—	—
NJD	2006–07	79	49	24	—	9	(107)	(fired)	—	—	—	—
NJD total		79	49	24	—	9			—	—	—	
BOS	2007–08	82	41	29	—	12	94	3rd in Northeast	3	4	.429	Lost in Conference quarterfinals (MTL)
BOS	2008–09	82	53	19	—	10	116	1st in Northeast	7	4	.636	Lost in Conference semifinals (CAR)
BOS	2009–10	82	39	30	—	13	91	3rd in Northeast	7	6	.538	Lost in Conference semifinals (PHI)
BOS	2010–11	82	46	25	—	11	103	1st in Northeast	16	9	.640	Won Stanley Cup (VAN)
BOS	2011–12	82	49	29	—	4	102	1st in Northeast	3	4	.429	Lost in Conference quarterfinals (WSH)
BOS	2012–13	48	28	14	—	6	62	2nd in Northeast	14	8	.636	Lost in Stanley Cup Final (CHI)
BOS	2013–14	82	54	19	—	9	117	1st in Atlantic	7	5	.583	Lost in second round (MTL)
BOS	2014–15	82	41	27	—	14	96	5th in Atlantic	—	—	—	Missed playoffs
BOS	2015–16	82	42	31	—	9	93	4th in Atlantic	—	—	—	Missed playoffs
BOS	2016–17	55	26	23	—	6	(58)	(fired)	—	—	—	—
BOS total		760	419	246	—	94			57	40	.588	7 playoff appearances 1 Stanley Cup
MTL	2016–17	24	16	7	—	1	(33)	1st in Atlantic	2	4	.333	Lost in first round (NYR)
MTL	2017–18	82	29	40	—	13	71	6th in Atlantic	—	—	—	Missed playoffs
MTL	2018–19	82	44	30	—	8	96	4th in Atlantic	—	—	—	Missed playoffs
MTL	2019–20	71	31	31	—	9	71	5th in Atlantic	5	5	.500	Lost in first round (PHI)
MTL	2020–21	18	9	5	—	4	(22)	(fired)	—	—	—	—
MTL total		436	201	175	10	50			11	16	.407	3 playoff appearances
Total		1,275	667	455	10	152			68	56	.548	10 playoff appearances 1 Stanley Cup

== See also ==
- List of NHL head coaches

Preceded by Bruce Boudreau	Jack Adams Award; 2009	Succeeded by Dave Tippett
Preceded by Michel Therrien	Head coach of the Montreal Canadiens; 2003–2006	Succeeded by Bob Gainey (interim)
Preceded by Lou Lamoriello (interim)	Head coach of the New Jersey Devils; 2006–2007	Succeeded by Lou Lamoriello (interim)
Preceded by Dave Lewis	Head coach of the Boston Bruins; 2007–2017	Succeeded by Bruce Cassidy (interim)
Preceded by Michel Therrien	Head coach of the Montreal Canadiens; 2017–2021	Succeeded by Dominique Ducharme
