= List of Boston Bruins head coaches =

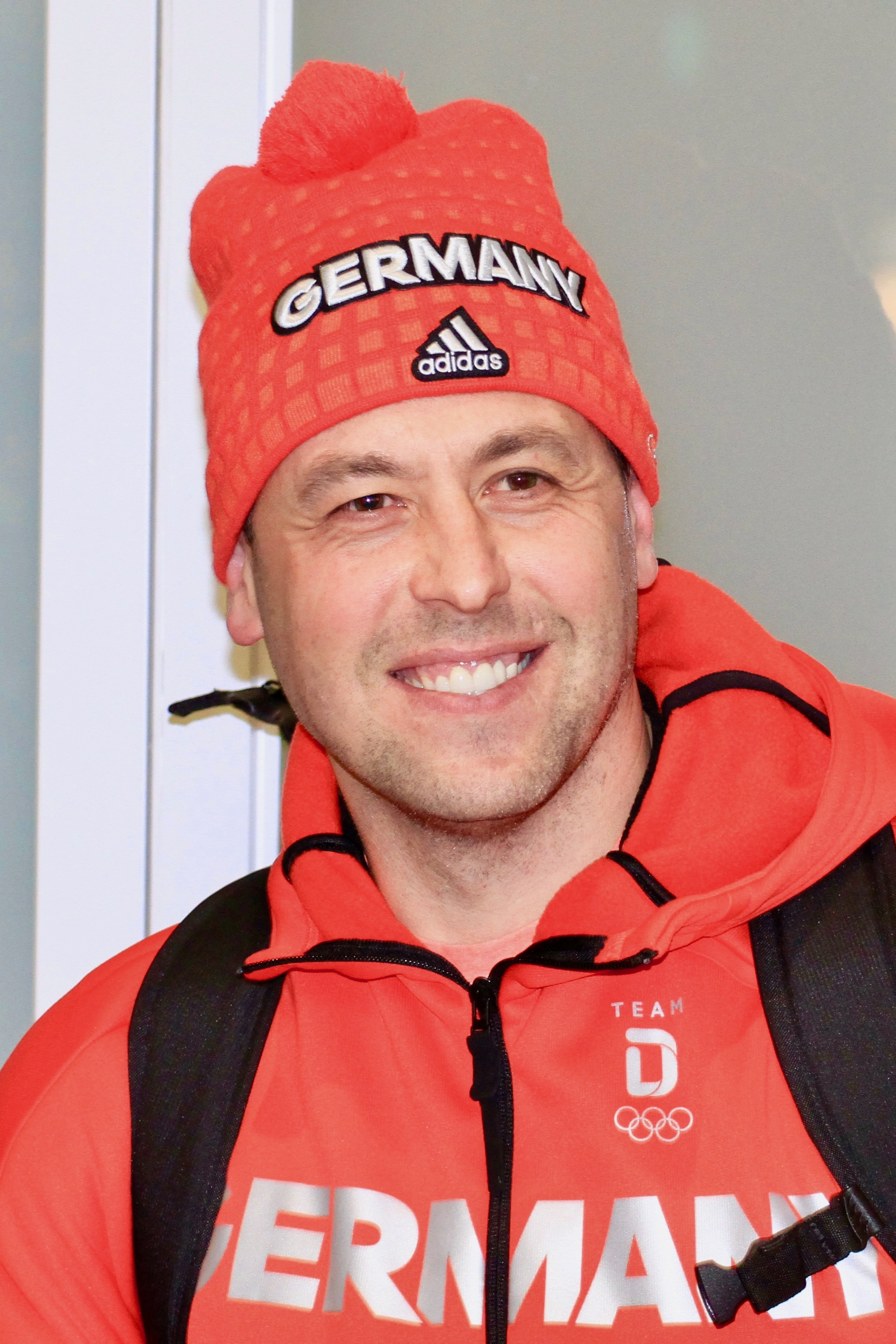
Marco Sturm is currently serving as head coach of the Bruins, being hired in 2025

The Boston Bruins, a professional ice hockey team based in Boston, has had 29 head coaches in its team history. The franchise is a member of the Atlantic Division of the Eastern Conference of the National Hockey League (NHL). The franchise was founded in 1924 and entered the NHL as the first American-based expansion team, playing its initial seasons at the still-active Boston Arena. It is an Original Six team, along with the Toronto Maple Leafs, Detroit Red Wings, New York Rangers, Montreal Canadiens and Chicago Blackhawks. Its home arena is the 17,565-person capacity TD Garden, where it has played since 1995, after leaving the Boston Garden.

Art Ross served three terms as the Bruins head coach. Ross, Lynn Patrick, and Milt Schmidt have all been inducted to the Hockey Hall of Fame. Harry Sinden, Gerry Cheevers, Tom Johnson and Frank Patrick are Hockey Hall of Fame inductees, and spent their entire coaching careers with the Bruins. Cooney Weiland, Dit Clapper, Terry O'Reilly, Steve Kasper and Mike O'Connell also coached only for the Bruins, with Mike Sullivan taking over as head coach for the Pittsburgh Penguins on December 12, 2015.

Statistically, Tom Johnson was the most successful head coach, with a winning percentage of .738. He is followed by Harry Sinden, who, averaging his two terms, had a winning percentage of .689. The worst head coach statistically was Phil Watson, who, with a winning percentage of .268, only won 16 out of the 84 games he coached. Claude Julien took over after Dave Lewis was dismissed in 2007. Bruce Cassidy succeeded Julien on February 7, 2017, and served as head coach until his firing on June 6, 2022. On June 30, 2022, the Bruins named Jim Montgomery head coach, replacing Cassidy. Following an 8–9–3 start to the 2024–25 season, Montgomery was fired, and replaced on an interim basis by assistant coach Joe Sacco. On June 5, 2025, the Bruins announced that they had hired former player Marco Sturm as their new head coach. Sturm is the first European coach in franchise history, being from Germany.

== Key ==
#	Number of coaches^{[A]}
GC	Games coached
W	Wins
L	Losses
T/OT	Ties or overtime losses
Win%	Winning percentage
*	Elected to the Hockey Hall of Fame
†	Spent entire professional head coaching career with the Bruins.
*†	Elected to the Hockey Hall of Fame and spent entire professional head coaching career with the Bruins.

== Coaches ==
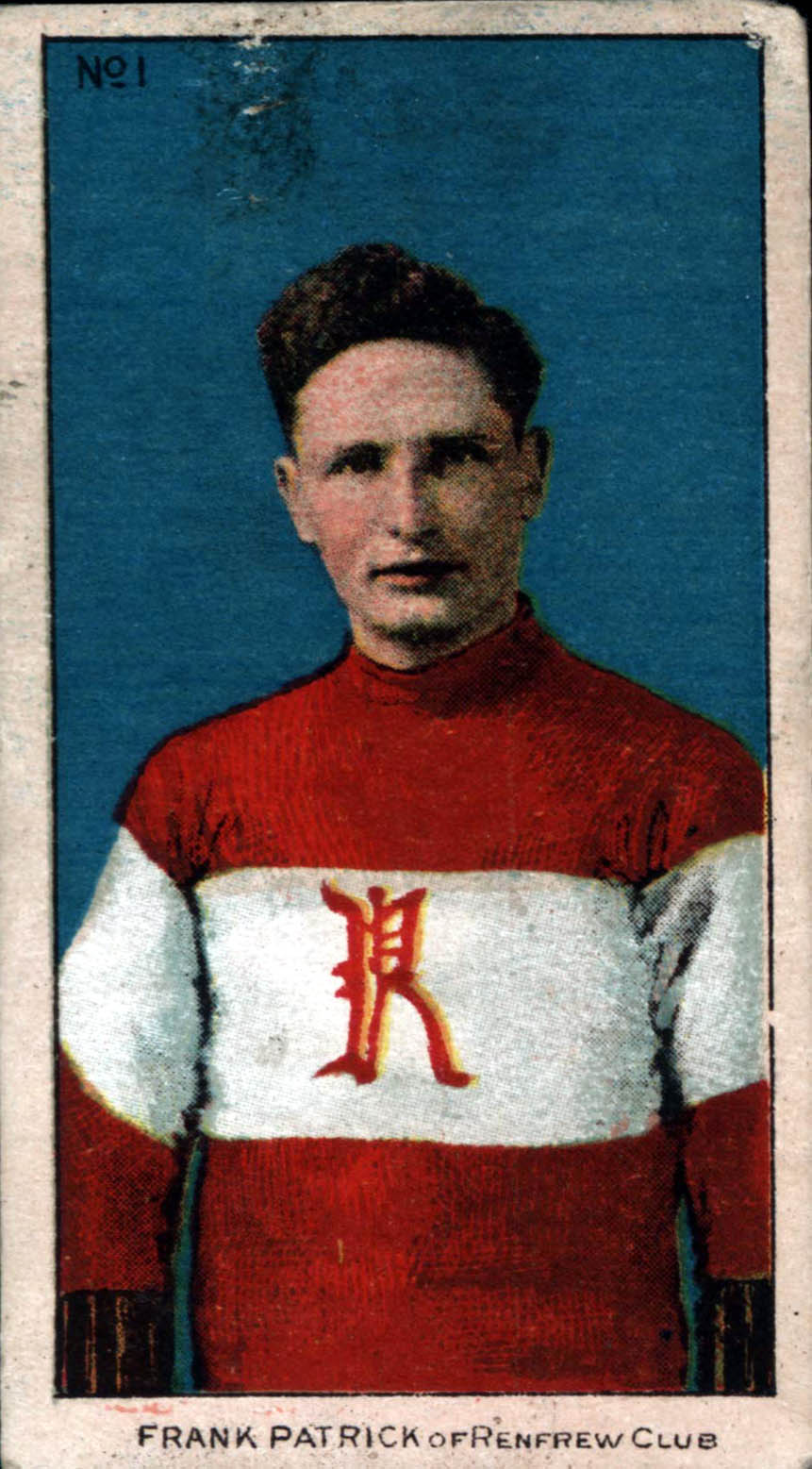
Frank Patrick led his team into the playoffs in every season of his Bruins coaching career.

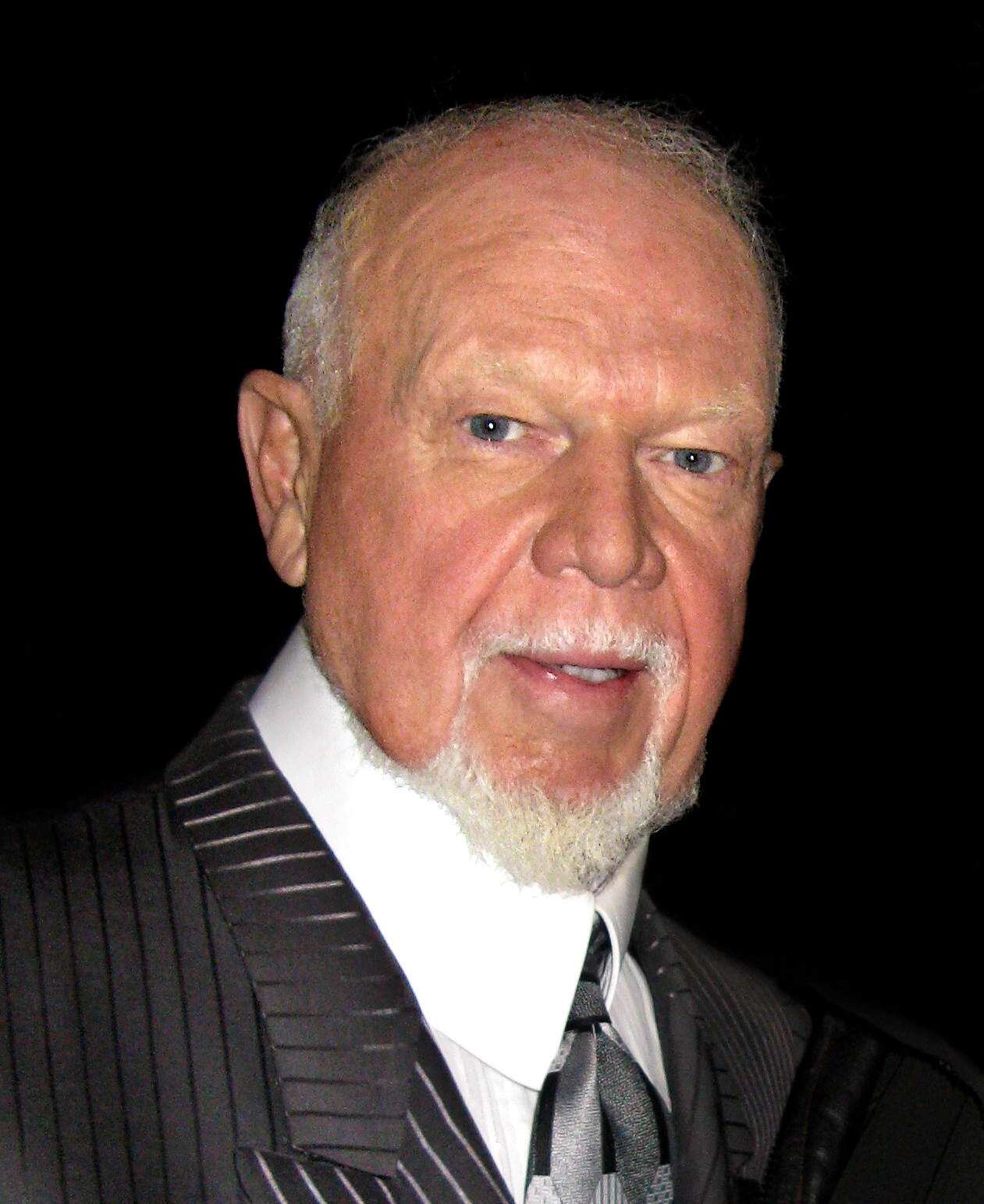
Don Cherry coached the Bruins from 1974-1979

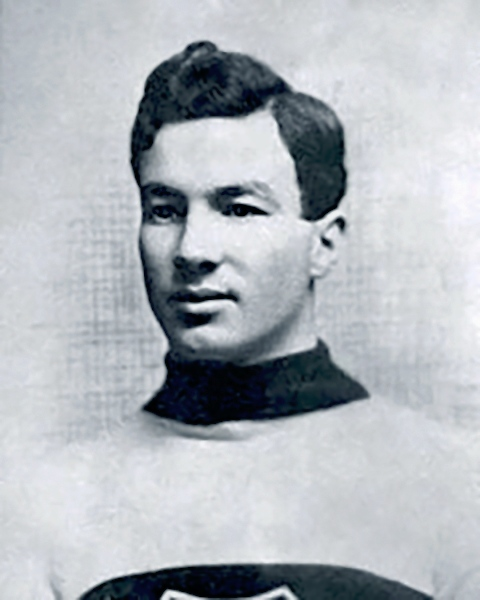
Art Ross the only 2x Stanley Cup winning coach of the Bruins

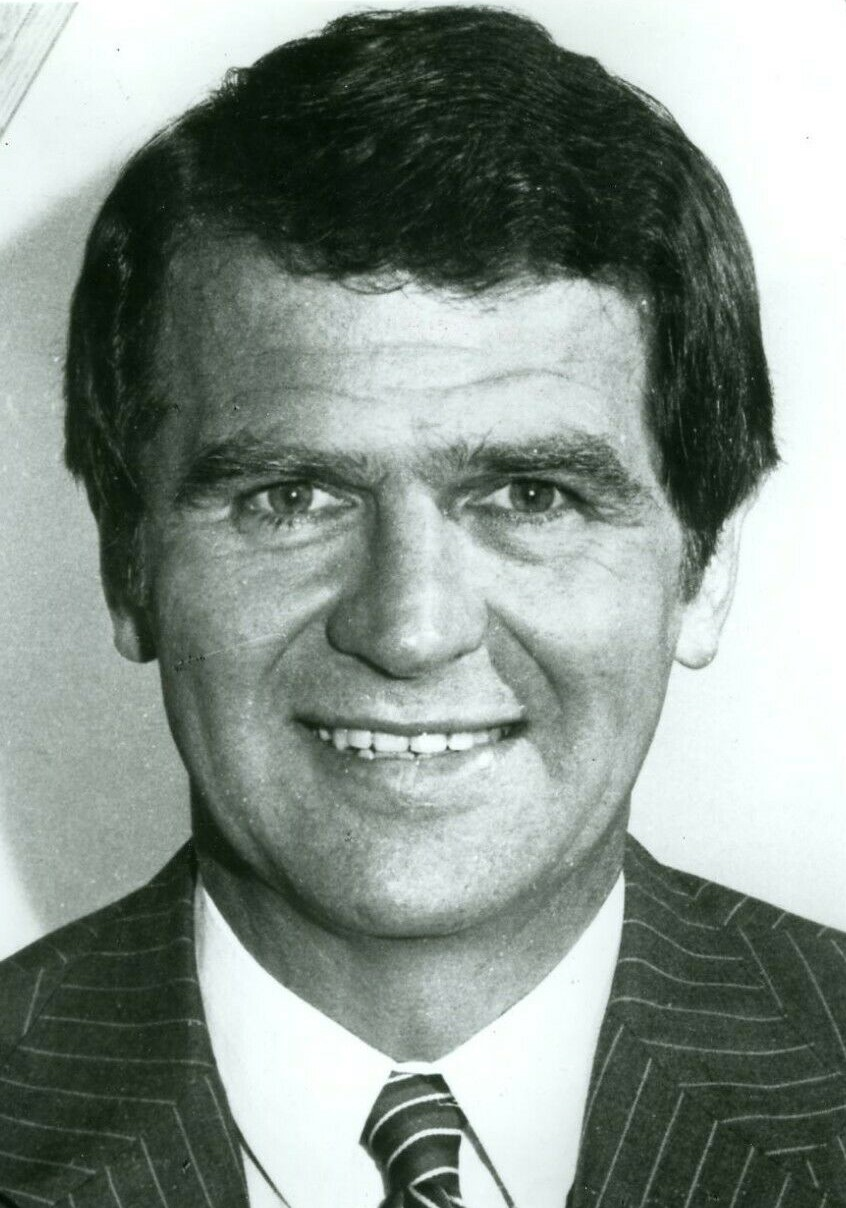
Harry Sinden had 3 separate stints as the Bruins head coach and led them to a Stanley Cup victory in 1970

Note: Statistics are correct through the end of the 2025–26 season.

#	Name	Term	Regular season					Playoffs				Championships/awards won^{[B]}	Ref.
#	Name	Term	GC	W	L	T/OT	Win%	GC	W	L	T	Championships/awards won^{[B]}	Ref.
1	Art Ross*	1924–1934	430	214	161	55	.497	31	14	12	5	Stanley Cup championship (1929)	
2	Frank Patrick*†	1934–1936	96	48	36	12	.563	6	2	4	0		
—	Art Ross*	1936–1939	144	89	39	16	.674	18	9	9	0	Stanley Cup championship (1939)	
3	Cooney Weiland†	1939–1941	96	58	20	18	.698	17	10	7	0	Stanley Cup championship (1941)	
—	Art Ross*	1941–1945	198	84	90	24	.485	21	9	12	0		
4	Dit Clapper†	1945–1949	230	102	88	40	.530	25	8	17	0		
5	Georges Boucher	1949–1950	70	22	32	16	.429	—	—	—	—		
6	Lynn Patrick*	1950–1954	310	117	130	63	.479	40	16	23	1		
7	Milt Schmidt*	1954–1961	460	172	203	75	.455	34	15	19	0		
8	Phil Watson	1961–1962	84	16	55	13	.268	—	—	—	—		
—	Milt Schmidt*	1962–1966	266	73	157	46	.361	—	—	—	—		
9	Harry Sinden*†	1966–1970	296	136	105	55	.552	28	18	10	0	Stanley Cup championship (1970)	
10	Tom Johnson*†	1970–1973	208	142	43	23	.738	22	15	7	0	Stanley Cup championship (1972)	
11	Bep Guidolin	1973–1974	104	72	23	9	.736	21	11	10	0		
12	Don Cherry	1974–1979	400	231	105	64	.658	55	31	24	0	Jack Adams Award winner (1976)	
13	Fred Creighton	1979–1980	73	40	20	13	.637	—	—	—	—		
—	Harry Sinden*†	1980	7	6	1	0	.857	10	4	6	0		
14	Gerry Cheevers*†	1980–1985	376	204	126	46	.604	34	15	19	0		
—	Harry Sinden*†	1985	24	11	10	3	.521	5	2	3	0		
15	Butch Goring	1985–1986	93	42	38	13	.522	3	0	3	0		
16	Terry O'Reilly†	1986–1989	227	115	86	26	.564	37	17	19	1		
17	Mike Milbury	1989–1991	160	90	49	21	.628	40	23	17	0		
18	Rick Bowness	1991–1992	80	36	32	12	.525	15	8	7	0		
19	Brian Sutter	1992–1995	216	120	73	23	.609	22	7	15	0		
20	Steve Kasper†	1995–1997	164	66	78	20	.463	5	1	4	0		
21	Pat Burns*	1997–2000	254	105	103	46	.504	18	8	10	0	Jack Adams Award winner (1998)	
22	Mike Keenan	2000–2001	74	33	34	7	.547	—	—	—	—		
23	Robbie Ftorek	2001–2003	155	76	65	14	.577	6	2	4	0		
24	Mike O'Connell†	2003	9	3	3	3	.500	5	1	4	0		
25	Mike Sullivan	2003–2006	164	70	79	15	.543	7	3	4	0		
26	Dave Lewis	2006–2007	82	35	41	6	.463	—	—	—	—		
27	Claude Julien	2007–2017	759	419	246	94	.614	97	57	40	—	Stanley Cup championship (2011); Jack Adams Award winner (2009)	
28	Bruce Cassidy	2017–2022	399	245	108	46	.672	73	36	37	0	Jack Adams Award winner (2020)	
29	Jim Montgomery	2022–2024	184	120	41	23	.652	19	9	10	0	Jack Adams Award winner (2023)	
—	Joe Sacco	2024–2025	60	24	30	6	.400	—	—	—	—		
30	Marco Sturm†	2025–present	82	45	27	10	.610	6	2	4	—		

== Notes ==
- ^{A} A running total of the number of different coaches of the Bruins—anyone with multiple terms as head coach is only counted once.
- ^{B} The Jack Adams Award has been issued since the 1973–74 season.
