= Dave Lewis (ice hockey) =

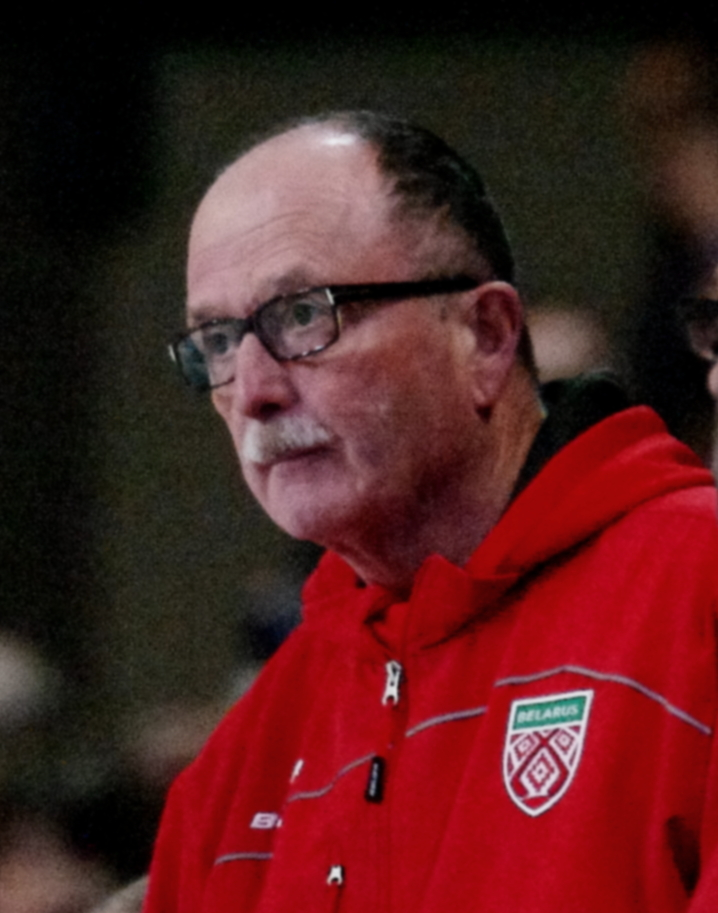
- Lewis in 2017
- Born: July 3, 1953 (age 73) Kindersley, Saskatchewan, Canada
- Height: 6 ft 2 in (188 cm)
- Weight: 200 lb (91 kg; 14 st 4 lb)
- Position: Defence
- Shot: Left
- Played for: New York Islanders; Los Angeles Kings; New Jersey Devils; Detroit Red Wings
- Coached for: Detroit Red Wings; Boston Bruins
- NHL draft: 33rd overall, 1973; New York Islanders
- WHA draft: 32nd overall, 1973; Alberta Oilers
- Playing career: 1973–1987
- Coaching career: 1988–2014

David Rodney Lewis (born July 3, 1953) is a Canadian former National Hockey League (NHL) defenceman and coach. He was most recently an assistant coach of the Carolina Hurricanes of the NHL. He has both Canadian and U.S. citizenship.

== Playing career ==
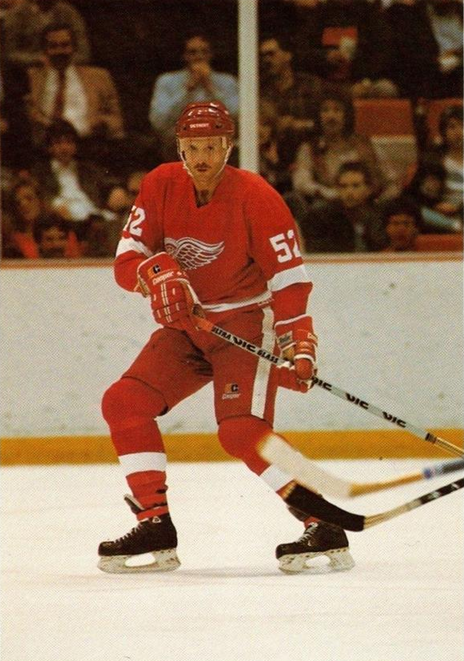
1986 photo of Lewis for Detroit Red Wings

Lewis began his playing career with the Saskatoon Blades of the Western Canada Hockey League. He was drafted by the New York Islanders in the 1973 NHL entry draft, third round, thirty-third overall. He played sixteen seasons with the New York Islanders, Los Angeles Kings, New Jersey Devils, and Detroit Red Wings, scoring 36 goals and 224 points in 1,008 games.

== Coaching career ==
After Lewis' playing career ended with the Red Wings in the 1987–88 season, he stayed with the team as an assistant coach. He helped Detroit win three Stanley Cups in 1997, 1998, and 2002. When Scotty Bowman retired in 2002, Lewis was named head coach of the Red Wings. In two seasons, he guided the Red Wings to two 48-win campaigns, including a Presidents' Trophy. In the playoffs, however, he had a record of 6–10. After the lockout ended, his contract was allowed to expire on June 30, 2005. He was re-hired by the Red Wings on August 9, 2005, as a scout.

On June 29, 2006, Lewis was named the 27th head coach of the Boston Bruins. His one and only season with the Bruins was not successful, as they finished with a 35–41–6 record, missing the playoffs for the second year in a row, and finishing in last place in the Northeast Division. In June 2007, Lewis was fired as coach of the Bruins by general manager Peter Chiarelli because of the team's highly inconsistent play throughout the season.

Lewis subsequently signed on as an assistant coach for the Los Angeles Kings for the 2007–2008 season. On August 4, 2008, it was announced he would not return for the 2008–2009 season.

On November 5, 2010, Lewis, whose maternal grandparents were from Ukraine, was hired as the coach of the Ukraine national team, though his association with that team was short-lived.

On June 7, 2011, Lewis was hired as the assistant coach of the Carolina Hurricanes. Lewis was fired along with head coach Kirk Muller and assistant coach John MacLean on May 5, 2014.

In December 2014, Lewis was hired as the head coach of the Belarusian national team. The contract was for one year with the possibility of extension up to the 2018 Olympics. Lewis has been the head coach for Belarus at the 2015, 2016, 2017, and 2018 World Championships. However, the team fell just short of qualifying for the 2018 Olympics. Lewis was fired just three games into the 2018 World Championships after Belarus lost all three games.

== Career statistics ==
=== Regular season and playoffs ===
			Regular season					Playoffs
Season	Team	League	GP	G	A	Pts	PIM	GP	G	A	Pts	PIM
1971–72	Saskatoon Blades	WCHL	52	2	9	11	69	8	2	3	5	4
1972–73	Saskatoon Blades	WCHL	67	10	35	45	89	16	3	12	15	44
1973–74	New York Islanders	NHL	66	2	15	17	58	—	—	—	—	—
1974–75	New York Islanders	NHL	78	5	14	19	98	17	0	1	1	28
1975–76	New York Islanders	NHL	73	0	19	19	54	13	0	1	1	44
1976–77	New York Islanders	NHL	79	4	24	29	44	12	1	6	7	4
1977–78	New York Islanders	NHL	77	3	11	14	58	7	0	1	1	11
1978–79	New York Islanders	NHL	79	5	18	23	43	10	0	0	0	4
1979–80	New York Islanders	NHL	62	5	16	21	54	—	—	—	—	—
1979–80	Los Angeles Kings	NHL	11	1	1	2	12	4	0	1	1	2
1980–81	Los Angeles Kings	NHL	67	1	13	14	98	4	0	2	2	4
1981–82	Los Angeles Kings	NHL	64	1	13	14	75	10	0	4	4	36
1982–83	Los Angeles Kings	NHL	79	2	10	12	53	—	—	—	—	—
1983–84	New Jersey Devils	NHL	66	2	5	7	63	—	—	—	—	—
1984–85	New Jersey Devils	NHL	74	3	9	12	78	—	—	—	—	—
1985–86	New Jersey Devils	NHL	69	0	15	15	81	—	—	—	—	—
1986–87	Detroit Red Wings	NHL	58	2	5	7	66	14	0	4	4	10
1987–88	Detroit Red Wings	NHL	6	0	0	0	18	—	—	—	—	—
WCHL totals			119	12	44	56	158	24	5	15	20	48
NHL totals			1,008	36	188	224	953	91	1	20	21	143

=== Coaching record ===
Team	Year	Regular season							Postseason			
Team	Year	G	W	L	T	OTL	Pts	Finish	W	L	Win %	Result
DET	2002–03	82	48	20	10	4	110	1st in Central	0	4	.000	Lost in Conference quarterfinals (MDA)
DET	2003–04	82	48	21	11	2	109	1st in Central	6	6	.500	Lost in Conference semifinals (CGY)
DET Total		164	96	41	21	6	219		6	10	.375	
BOS	2006–07	82	35	41	–	6	76	5th in Northeast	–	–	–	
BOS Total		82	35	41	–	6	76		–	–	–	
Total		246	131	82	21	12	295	2 Division Titles	6	10	.375	2 playoff appearances

== See also ==
- List of NHL players with 1,000 games played

Preceded by Mike Murphy	Los Angeles Kings captain 1981–83	Succeeded by Terry Ruskowski
Preceded by Scotty Bowman	Head coach of the Detroit Red Wings; 2002–05	Succeeded by Mike Babcock
Preceded by Mike Sullivan	Head coach of the Boston Bruins; 2006–07	Succeeded by Claude Julien
