= Mike Sullivan (pilot) =

American pilot (born 1970)

Michael Paul Sullivan (born August 5, 1970 in Baltimore, Maryland) was the third son of John F. Sullivan, Jr (1929-2004). After serving in the United States Air Force, he went on to become a test pilot for NASA at Cape Canaveral. Sullivan is credited with the ECLIPS Experimental Cloud Lidar Pilot Study, which was initiated to obtain statistics on cloud-base height, extinction, optical depth, cloud brokenness, and surface fluxes.
