= 2005–06 NHL season =

National Hockey League season

- League: National Hockey League
- Sport: Ice hockey
- Duration: October 5, 2005 – June 19, 2006
- Games: 82
- Teams: 30
- TV partner(s): CBC, TSN, RDS (Canada); OLN, NBC (United States)

Draft
- Top draft pick: Sidney Crosby
- Picked by: Pittsburgh Penguins

Regular season
- Presidents' Trophy: Detroit Red Wings
- Season MVP: Joe Thornton (Bruins, Sharks)
- Top scorer: Joe Thornton (Bruins, Sharks)

Playoffs
- Playoffs MVP: Cam Ward (Hurricanes)

Stanley Cup
- Champions: Carolina Hurricanes
- Runners-up: Edmonton Oilers

NHL seasons
- 2004–05 2006–07

The 2005–06 NHL season was the 89th season of operation (88th season of play) of the National Hockey League (NHL). This season succeeded the 2004–05 season which had all of its scheduled games canceled due to a labor dispute with the National Hockey League Players' Association (NHLPA) over the Collective Bargaining Agreement (CBA) between the League and its players. The season featured the first time that all 30 of its member teams played games on the same day, which happened the first day of the season, October 5, 2005.

A mid-season break in February occurred to allow participation of NHL players in the 2006 Winter Olympics in Turin, Italy. Because of the Winter Olympics break, there was no NHL All-Star Game for 2006.

The 2006 Stanley Cup playoffs began on April 21, 2006, and concluded on June 19, with the Carolina Hurricanes defeating the Edmonton Oilers to win their first Stanley Cup, after which the Oilers would miss the postseason ten consecutive times and 12 of their next 13, while the Hurricanes would miss 11 of their next 12.

== League business ==
=== New collective bargaining agreement ===
On July 13, 2005, the NHL, and NHLPA jointly announced that they had tentatively agreed to a new collective bargaining agreement which would allow the resumption of hockey for the 2005–06 season. The agreement was voted on July 21 by NHLPA members, and approved by a nearly 7 to 1 margin. The following day, the NHL's Board of Governors (owners) voted unanimously to approve the new agreement.

=== New NHL and conference logos ===
The modernized NHL shield logo was introduced for the 2005–06 season. The metallic silver color is said to have been inspired by the Stanley Cup, the trophy given to the playoff champion.

A new logo for the NHL was unveiled, with "NHL" printed in upward-reading letters to project a vibrant, optimistic image, and having silver as the dominant color to pay homage to the Stanley Cup. Also, new Eastern and Western Conference logos were unveiled before the Olympic break, with red as the dominant East color, and blue as the dominant West color.

=== Rule changes ===
The league returned with a revamped rulebook, to the point that many refer to "pre-lockout" and "post-lockout" when comparing statistics. The rule experimentation was based on the previous season of play in the AHL, and was based on creating a more exciting game with more scoring opportunities. Furthermore, a new Competition Committee was formed to discuss future rule changes, and players were invited to participate in the discussion.

- The league introduced shoot-outs at the end of over-time if the score is tied. The shootout features only three shots per team, and if it is still tied, the shootout becomes sudden death. In preseason games (regardless of the outcome) shootouts were held. Shootouts are only in effect for regular-season games. Playoff games will continue with twenty-minute periods until a sudden-death goal is scored.
- The neutral zone becomes smaller by four feet (1.2 m).
- All blue and red lines are returned to the traditional width of 12 inches (31 cm). The double-width lines used in the AHL 2004–05 season were abandoned.
- If a team ices the puck, it is not allowed to make a line change afterwards.
- Linesmen are given more discretion when it comes to waving off icing calls when they are accidentally made as the result of a failed pass attempt.
- The "two-line offside pass" rule was abolished; this rule required a stoppage in play if a pass originating from inside a team's defending zone was completed on the offensive side of the center line, unless the puck crossed the line before the player.
- Goalies are now restricted from playing the puck from outside a new trapezoidal area located in the middle of the area behind the goal line, with offenders who do not follow the rule being given a 2-minute delay of game penalty that is served by a teammate.
- Players who instigate a fight in the last five minutes of a game will be given a game misconduct penalty plus a one-game suspension. Furthermore, the player's coach will be fined $10,000 (US).
- Goaltender equipment was reduced in size by eleven percent.
- All referees are equipped with wireless microphones so they can now announce penalties over the public address system, similar to National Football League (NFL) and Canadian Football League (CFL) referees.
  - With multiple penalties, only the first will be announced by the referee calling the penalty, with the others being announced by the arena's ice-side PA announcer (in English); penalty announcements will also be relayed in French via the Bell Centre's PA announcer for the Montreal Canadiens.
- Any player that shoots the puck over the glass (without deflection) from his own defensive zone will be penalized for delay of game. After the 2006 Olympic break, the rule was modified to read that the puck must cross the glass before crossing the blue line.
- After the 2006 Olympic break, all sticks to be used in the shootout will be measured prior to use.

=== Entry draft ===
The 2005 NHL entry draft was held at the Westin Hotel in Ottawa, Ontario. It was originally scheduled to be held at the Corel Centre, but the Ottawa Senators' home arena could not be used on such short notice after the lockout ended. Sidney Crosby was selected first overall by the Pittsburgh Penguins.

== Arena changes ==
- The Boston Bruins' home arena, FleetCenter, was renamed TD Banknorth Garden as part of a new naming rights agreement with TD Banknorth.
- The Florida Panthers' home arena, Office Depot Center, was renamed Bank Atlantic Center as part of a new naming rights agreement with BankAtlantic.
- The Ottawa Senators' home arena, Corel Centre, was renamed Scotiabank Place on January 19, 2006, as part of a new naming rights agreement with Scotiabank.

== Regular season ==
In terms of total goals scored during an NHL regular season, the 2005–06 regular season turned out to be the highest-scoring in NHL history, with 7,443 goals scored in 1,230 games. However, the highest-scoring season in terms of goals per game still belonged to the 1992–93 regular season, in which 7,311 goals were scored in only 1,008 games, for an average of 7.25 per game (the average in 2005–06 was 6.05 per game). The record for most shorthanded goals scored in a season, set in 1992–93 and matched in 1993–94 at 312, was broken as 318 shorthanded goals were scored. A total of 117 shutouts were recorded, down from an all-time high of 192 in 2003–04. The higher offensive numbers were largely attributable, among other things, to greater frequency of power plays. In 2003–04, teams had an average of 348 power plays over 82 games. In 2005–06, the average number of power plays per team over 82 games was 480.

The NHL season began on October 5, which marked the first time ever that all 30 teams in the league played a game on the same day. In the first period of each game, all teams wore a jersey with a special patch; the league and players association then auctioned off the jerseys for the benefit of the Red Cross in both the United States and Canada, earmarking the proceeds for Hurricane Katrina victims (the Islanders' ECHL affiliate in Biloxi, Mississippi suspended operations for the 2005–06 and 2006–07 seasons because of this disaster, and the NHL toured ECHL cities with the Stanley Cup to raise additional funds for relief efforts). Jean-Pierre Dumont of the Buffalo Sabres scored the first goal of the regular season, and Daniel Alfredsson and Dany Heatley, of the Ottawa Senators became the first players to score the winning goals for a shootout in NHL history, both scoring against Toronto Maple Leafs goaltender Ed Belfour. Their sticks were subsequently sent to the nearby Hockey Hall of Fame in Toronto.

The All-Star Game, which would have been in Phoenix did not take place; the league instead took a break in February so that many of its players could participate in the XX Winter Olympic Games in Turin, Italy. The new schedule features more intra-division games in order to promote division rivalries. Consequently, there are whole divisions in the opposite conference that teams never played during the season.

This season saw the much-hyped debuts of (and immediate rivalry between) Sidney Crosby and Alexander Ovechkin. It was only the second time that two rookies had over 100 points in a season (Teemu Selanne and Joe Juneau performed the feat in 1992–93). Ovechkin finished with 106 points, which is third best all-time among NHL rookies. Crosby surpassed teammate Mario Lemieux's 100-point rookie season, finishing with 102 points, currently fifth best all-time.

On November 30, 2005, Joe Thornton was traded from the Boston Bruins to the San Jose Sharks in a four-player deal which sent forwards Marco Sturm and Wayne Primeau and defenceman Brad Stuart to Boston. Thornton went on to win the scoring title. The Bruins would not make the playoffs until 2008.

On November 26, the New York Rangers and Washington Capitals played the second-longest NHL shootout to date. Rangers defenceman Marek Malik scored the winning goal in the 15th round, pulling the puck between his own legs to defeat Capitals goaltender Olaf Kolzig, giving the Rangers the victory by the final score of 3–2.

Three early-season games had to be rescheduled due to various events. Hurricane Wilma had forced the NHL to reschedule two Florida Panthers home games, in which their game against Ottawa Senators scheduled on October 22 was rescheduled to December 5; the game against the Washington Capitals scheduled for October 29 was moved to December 1. The Nashville Predators–Detroit Red Wings game on November 22 was called off with 7:30 left in the first period after Red Wings defenceman Jiri Fischer suffered a seizure and had to be resuscitated. It was rescheduled to January 23, 2006, with the game starting 1–0 for Nashville as Greg Johnson's goal from the original date was allowed to stand, but all other statistics were expunged. The game that was originally scheduled for January 23 at Nashville between the two teams was moved to March 30, 2006.

On January 12, the New York Rangers retired the number 11 of long-time captain Mark Messier to the rafters of Madison Square Garden. The Rangers would beat Messier's former team, the Edmonton Oilers, 5–4 in overtime.

On January 19, Los Angeles Kings veteran left winger Luc Robitaille scored his 550th, 551st and 552nd goals as a member of the Kings, eclipsing Marcel Dionne's franchise record of 550 goals. The 40-year-old Robitaille retired at season's end.

The season was rocked with scandal in early February when it came to light that Phoenix Coyotes Assistant coach Rick Tocchet was found to be involved in a $1.6 million illegal sports gambling ring with Mafia ties. Apparently, no betting on NHL games was being done, but bets were being placed on college and professional football and college and professional basketball. Although Coyotes Head Coach Wayne Gretzky denied any knowledge or involvement in the ring, initial reports stated that wiretapped phone conversations he had proved that he not only knew about the ring, but was trying to find ways to conceal his wife's involvement in it. He was later cleared of these accusations, but long-term implications to his reputation are still unknown.

On April 15, in the Nashville Predators' 81st game of the season, Nashville goaltender Chris Mason was credited with a goal when the Phoenix Coyotes' Geoff Sanderson put the puck in his own net. Mason was awarded credit for the goal, as he was the last Predator to have touched the puck. It was the ninth regular season goal scored by a goaltender in NHL history. The last goal of the regular season was scored by Kyle Calder of the Chicago Blackhawks in overtime in a 3–2 victory over the St. Louis Blues, which ended the 2005–06 regular season at 10:50 EDT on April 18, 2006.

The Tampa Bay Lightning narrowly avoided becoming the first team since the New Jersey Devils in the 1995–96 season to miss the post-season after winning the Stanley Cup the previous season.

This season also marked the first time since the 1978–79 season that the St. Louis Blues did not qualify for the Stanley Cup playoffs, ending the third-longest NHL post-season appearance streak at 25 seasons. Only the Chicago Blackhawks (28 seasons) and the Boston Bruins (29 seasons) had longer streaks.

This season also marked the last time until the 2022–23 season that the Pittsburgh Penguins missed the playoffs.

== Standings ==
The Detroit Red Wings won the Presidents' Trophy and home-ice advantage throughout the playoffs.

For ranking in conference, division leaders are automatically ranked 1–3. These three, plus the next five teams in the conference standings, earn playoff berths at the end of the season.

=== Eastern Conference ===
Atlantic Division
No.	CR		GP	W	L	OTL	GF	GA	Pts
1	3	New Jersey Devils	82	46	27	9	242	229	101
2	5	Philadelphia Flyers	82	45	26	11	267	259	101
3	6	New York Rangers	82	44	26	12	257	215	100
4	12	New York Islanders	82	36	40	6	230	278	78
5	15	Pittsburgh Penguins	82	22	46	14	244	316	58

Northeast Division
No.	CR		GP	W	L	OTL	GF	GA	Pts
1	1	Ottawa Senators	82	52	21	9	314	211	113
2	4	Buffalo Sabres	82	52	24	6	281	239	110
3	7	Montreal Canadiens	82	42	31	9	243	247	93
4	9	Toronto Maple Leafs	82	41	33	8	257	270	90
5	13	Boston Bruins	82	29	37	16	230	266	74

Southeast Division
No.	CR		GP	W	L	OTL	GF	GA	Pts
1	2	Carolina Hurricanes	82	52	22	8	294	260	112
2	8	Tampa Bay Lightning	82	43	33	6	252	260	92
3	10	Atlanta Thrashers	82	41	33	8	281	275	90
4	11	Florida Panthers	82	37	34	11	240	257	85
5	14	Washington Capitals	82	29	41	12	237	306	70

Eastern Conference
R		Div	GP	W	L	OTL	GF	GA	Pts
1	Z- Ottawa Senators	NE	82	52	21	9	314	211	113
2	Y- Carolina Hurricanes	SE	82	52	22	8	294	260	112
3	Y- New Jersey Devils	AT	82	46	27	9	242	229	101
4	X- Buffalo Sabres	NE	82	52	24	6	242	239	110
5	X- Philadelphia Flyers	AT	82	45	26	11	267	259	101
6	X- New York Rangers	AT	82	44	26	12	257	215	100
7	X- Montreal Canadiens	NE	82	42	31	9	243	247	93
8	X- Tampa Bay Lightning	SE	82	43	33	6	252	260	92
8.5
9	Toronto Maple Leafs	NE	82	41	33	8	257	270	90
10	Atlanta Thrashers	SE	82	41	33	8	281	275	90
11	Florida Panthers	SE	82	37	34	11	240	257	85
12	New York Islanders	AT	82	36	40	6	230	278	78
13	Boston Bruins	NE	82	29	37	16	230	266	74
14	Washington Capitals	SE	82	29	41	12	237	306	70
15	Pittsburgh Penguins	AT	82	22	46	14	244	316	58

Divisions: AT – Atlantic, NE – Northeast, SE – Southeast

Z – Clinched conference; Y – Clinched division; X – Clinched playoff spot

=== Western Conference ===
Central Division
No.	CR		GP	W	L	OTL	GF	GA	Pts
1	1	Detroit Red Wings	82	58	16	8	305	209	124
2	4	Nashville Predators	82	49	25	8	259	227	106
3	13	Columbus Blue Jackets	82	35	43	4	223	279	74
4	14	Chicago Blackhawks	82	26	43	13	211	285	65
5	15	St. Louis Blues	82	21	46	15	197	292	57

Northwest Division
No.	CR		GP	W	L	OTL	GF	GA	Pts
1	3	Calgary Flames	82	46	25	11	218	200	103
2	7	Colorado Avalanche	82	43	30	9	283	257	95
3	8	Edmonton Oilers	82	41	28	13	256	251	95
4	9	Vancouver Canucks	82	42	32	8	256	255	92
5	11	Minnesota Wild	82	38	36	8	231	215	84

Pacific Division
No.	CR		GP	W	L	OTL	GF	GA	Pts
1	2	Dallas Stars	82	53	23	6	265	218	112
2	5	San Jose Sharks	82	44	27	11	266	242	99
3	6	Mighty Ducks of Anaheim	82	43	27	12	254	229	98
4	10	Los Angeles Kings	82	42	35	5	249	270	89
5	12	Phoenix Coyotes	82	38	39	5	246	271	81

Western Conference
R		Div	GP	W	L	OTL	GF	GA	Pts
1	P- Detroit Red Wings	CE	82	58	16	8	305	209	124
2	Y- Dallas Stars	PA	82	53	23	6	265	218	112
3	Y- Calgary Flames	NW	82	46	25	11	218	200	103
4	X- Nashville Predators	CE	82	49	25	8	259	227	106
5	X- San Jose Sharks	PA	82	44	27	11	266	242	99
6	X- Mighty Ducks of Anaheim	PA	82	43	27	12	254	229	98
7	X- Colorado Avalanche	NW	82	43	30	9	283	257	95
8	X- Edmonton Oilers	NW	82	41	28	13	256	251	95
8.5
9	Vancouver Canucks	NW	82	42	32	8	256	255	92
10	Los Angeles Kings	PA	82	42	35	5	249	270	89
11	Minnesota Wild	NW	82	38	36	8	231	215	84
12	Phoenix Coyotes	PA	82	38	39	5	246	271	81
13	Columbus Blue Jackets	CE	82	35	43	4	223	279	74
14	Chicago Blackhawks	CE	82	26	43	13	211	285	65
15	St. Louis Blues	CE	82	21	46	15	197	292	57

Divisions: CE – Central, PA – Pacific, NW – Northwest

P – Clinched Presidents Trophy; Y – Clinched division; X – Clinched playoff spot

=== Tiebreaking procedures ===
If two or more clubs are tied in points during the regular season, the standing of the clubs is determined in the following order:

1. The fewer number of games played (i.e., superior points percentage).
2. The greater number of games won.
3. The greater number of points earned in games between the tied clubs.
4. The greater differential between goals for and against.

== Playoffs ==
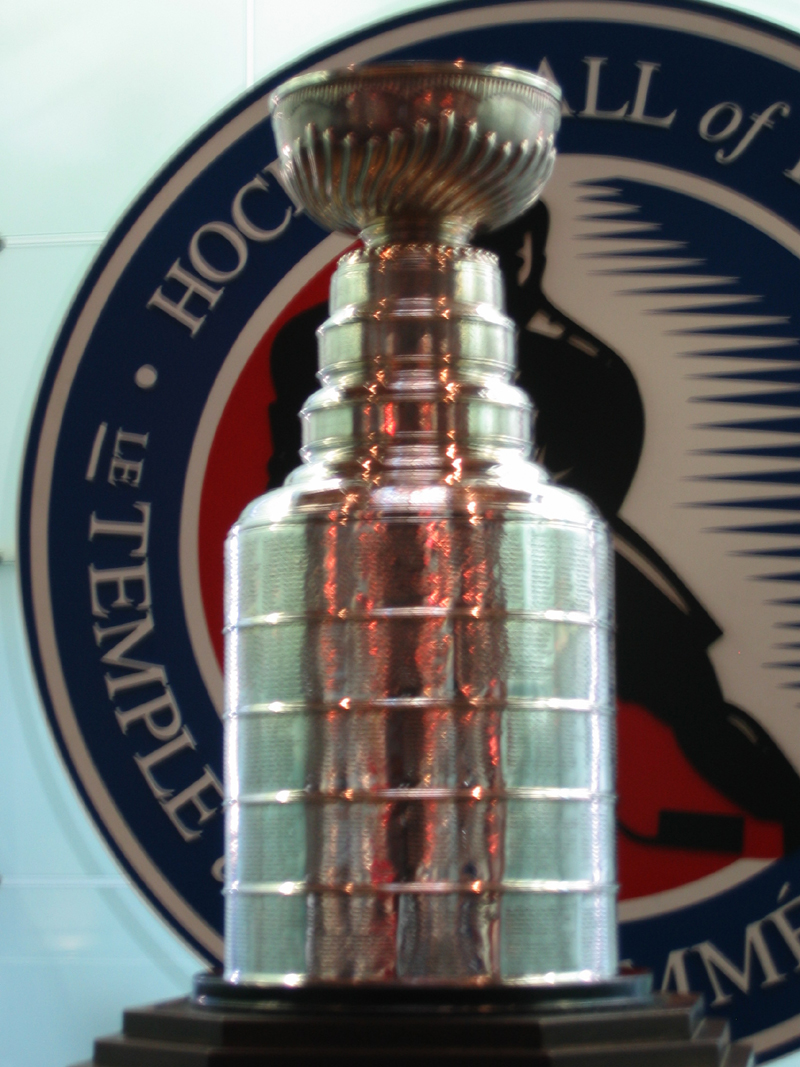
The Stanley Cup

=== Bracket ===
In each round, teams competed in a best-of-seven series following a 2–2–1–1–1 format (scores in the bracket indicate the number of games won in each best-of-seven series). The team with home ice advantage played at home for games one and two (and games five and seven, if necessary), and the other team played at home for games three and four (and game six, if necessary). The top eight teams in each conference made the playoffs, with the three division winners seeded 1–3 based on regular season record, and the five remaining teams seeded 4–8.

The NHL used "re-seeding" instead of a fixed bracket playoff system. During the first three rounds, the highest remaining seed in each conference was matched against the lowest remaining seed, the second-highest remaining seed played the second-lowest remaining seed, and so forth. The higher-seeded team was awarded home ice advantage. The two conference winners then advanced to the Stanley Cup Finals, where home ice advantage was awarded to the team that had the better regular season record.

Conference quarterfinals	Conference semifinals
1	Ottawa	4
8	Tampa Bay	1
1	Ottawa	1
4	Buffalo	4
2	Carolina	4
7	Montreal	2
Eastern Conference
3	New Jersey	4
6	NY Rangers	0
2	Carolina	4
3	New Jersey	1
4	Buffalo	4
5	Philadelphia	2
1	Detroit	2
8	Edmonton	4
5	San Jose	2
8	Edmonton	4
2	Dallas	1
7	Colorado	4
Western Conference
3	Calgary	3
6	Anaheim	4
6	Anaheim	4
7	Colorado	0
4	Nashville	1
5	San Jose	4

Conference finals
4	Buffalo	3
2	Carolina	4
8	Edmonton	4
6	Anaheim	1

Stanley Cup Finals
E2	Carolina	4
W8	Edmonton	3

== Awards ==
Award	Recipient(s)	Finalists/Runner(s)-up
Presidents' Trophy:	Detroit Red Wings	Ottawa Senators
Prince of Wales Trophy: (Eastern Conference playoff champion)	Carolina Hurricanes	Buffalo Sabres
Clarence S. Campbell Bowl: (Western Conference playoff champion)	Edmonton Oilers	Mighty Ducks of Anaheim
Art Ross Trophy:	Joe Thornton, San Jose Sharks/Boston Bruins	Jaromir Jagr (New York Rangers)
Bill Masterton Memorial Trophy:	Teemu Selanne, Mighty Ducks of Anaheim	N/A
Calder Memorial Trophy:	Alexander Ovechkin, Washington Capitals	Sidney Crosby (Pittsburgh Penguins); Dion Phaneuf (Calgary Flames)
Conn Smythe Trophy:	Cam Ward, Carolina Hurricanes	N/A
Frank J. Selke Trophy:	Rod Brind'Amour, Carolina Hurricanes	Jere Lehtinen (Dallas Stars); Mike Fisher (Ottawa Senators)
Hart Memorial Trophy:	Joe Thornton, San Jose Sharks/Boston Bruins	Miikka Kiprusoff (Calgary Flames); Jaromir Jagr (New York Rangers)
Jack Adams Award:	Lindy Ruff, Buffalo Sabres	Tom Renney (New York Rangers); Peter Laviolette (Carolina Hurricanes)
James Norris Memorial Trophy:	Nicklas Lidstrom, Detroit Red Wings	Scott Niedermayer (Mighty Ducks of Anaheim); Sergei Zubov (Dallas Stars)
King Clancy Memorial Trophy:	Olaf Kolzig, Washington Capitals	N/A
Lady Byng Memorial Trophy:	Pavel Datsyuk, Detroit Red Wings	Brad Richards (Tampa Bay Lightning); Patrick Marleau (San Jose Sharks)
Lester B. Pearson Award:	Jaromir Jagr, New York Rangers	Joe Thornton (San Jose Sharks/Boston Bruins); Alexander Ovechkin (Washington Capitals)
Maurice "Rocket" Richard Trophy:	Jonathan Cheechoo, San Jose Sharks	Jaromir Jagr (New York Rangers)
NHL Foundation Player Award:	Marty Turco, Dallas Stars	N/A
NHL Plus-Minus Award:	Wade Redden, Ottawa Senators; Michal Rozsival, New York Rangers	
Roger Crozier Saving Grace Award:	Cristobal Huet, Montreal Canadiens	N/A
Vezina Trophy:	Miikka Kiprusoff, Calgary Flames	Henrik Lundqvist (New York Rangers); Martin Brodeur (New Jersey Devils)
William M. Jennings Trophy:	Miikka Kiprusoff, Calgary Flames	N/A

=== All-Star teams ===
First Team	Position	Second Team
Miikka Kiprusoff, Calgary Flames	G	Martin Brodeur, New Jersey Devils
Nicklas Lidstrom, Detroit Red Wings	D	Zdeno Chara, Ottawa Senators
Scott Niedermayer, Mighty Ducks of Anaheim	D	Sergei Zubov, Dallas Stars
Joe Thornton, Boston/San Jose	C	Eric Staal, Carolina Hurricanes
Jaromir Jagr, New York Rangers	RW	Daniel Alfredsson, Ottawa Senators
Alexander Ovechkin, Washington Capitals	LW	Dany Heatley, Ottawa Senators

== Player statistics ==
=== Scoring leaders ===
Note: GP = Games played; G = Goals; A = Assists; Pts = Points; +/- = Plus/minus; PIM = Penalty minutes

Player	Team	GP	G	A	Pts	+/-	PIM
Joe Thornton	Boston Bruins/San Jose Sharks	81	29	96	125	+31	61
Jaromir Jagr	New York Rangers	82	54	69	123	+34	72
Alexander Ovechkin	Washington Capitals	81	52	54	106	+2	52
Dany Heatley	Ottawa Senators	82	50	53	103	+29	86
Daniel Alfredsson	Ottawa Senators	77	43	60	103	+29	50
Sidney Crosby	Pittsburgh Penguins	81	39	63	102	-1	110
Eric Staal	Carolina Hurricanes	82	45	55	100	-8	81
Ilya Kovalchuk	Atlanta Thrashers	78	52	46	98	-6	68
Marc Savard	Atlanta Thrashers	82	28	69	97	+7	100
Jonathan Cheechoo	San Jose Sharks	82	56	37	93	+23	25

Source: NHL.

=== Leading goaltenders ===
Minimum 1,000 minutes played.

Note: GP = Games played; Min = Minutes played; W = Wins; L = Losses; OT = Overtime/shootout losses; GA = Goals against; SO = Shutouts; Sv% = Save percentage; GAA = Goals against average

Player	Team	GP	Min	W	L	OT	GA	SO	Sv%	GAA
Miikka Kiprusoff	Calgary Flames	74	4379:40	42	20	11	151	10	.923	2.07
Dominik Hasek	Ottawa Senators	43	2583:58	28	10	4	90	5	.925	2.09
Manny Legace	Detroit Red Wings	51	2905:09	37	8	3	106	7	.915	2.19
Cristobal Huet	Montreal Canadiens	36	2102:59	18	11	4	77	7	.929	2.20
Henrik Lundqvist	New York Rangers	53	3111:53	30	12	9	116	2	.922	2.24
Manny Fernandez	Minnesota Wild	58	3411:14	30	18	7	130	1	.919	2.29
Ilya Bryzgalov	Mighty Ducks of Anaheim	31	1575:13	13	12	1	66	1	.910	2.51
Marty Turco	Dallas Stars	68	3910:12	41	19	5	166	3	.898	2.55
Vesa Toskala	San Jose Sharks	37	2039:13	23	7	4	87	2	.901	2.56
Martin Brodeur	New Jersey Devils	73	4364:35	43	23	7	187	5	.911	2.57

== Coaches ==
=== Eastern Conference ===
- Atlanta Thrashers: Bob Hartley
- Boston Bruins: Mike Sullivan
- Buffalo Sabres: Lindy Ruff
- Carolina Hurricanes: Peter Laviolette
- Florida Panthers: Jacques Martin
- Montreal Canadiens: Claude Julien and Bob Gainey
- New Jersey Devils: Larry Robinson, Lou Lamoriello and Claude Julien
- New York Islanders: Steve Stirling and Brad Shaw
- New York Rangers: Tom Renney
- Ottawa Senators: Bryan Murray
- Philadelphia Flyers: Ken Hitchcock
- Pittsburgh Penguins: Michel Therrien
- Tampa Bay Lightning: John Tortorella
- Toronto Maple Leafs: Pat Quinn
- Washington Capitals: Glen Hanlon

=== Western Conference ===
- Mighty Ducks of Anaheim: Randy Carlyle
- Calgary Flames: Darryl Sutter
- Chicago Blackhawks: Trent Yawney
- Colorado Avalanche: Joel Quenneville
- Columbus Blue Jackets: Gerard Gallant and Gary Agnew
- Dallas Stars: Dave Tippett
- Detroit Red Wings: Mike Babcock
- Edmonton Oilers: Craig MacTavish
- Los Angeles Kings: Andy Murray and John Torchetti
- Minnesota Wild: Jacques Lemaire
- Nashville Predators: Barry Trotz
- Phoenix Coyotes: Wayne Gretzky
- San Jose Sharks: Ron Wilson
- St. Louis Blues: Mike Kitchen
- Vancouver Canucks: Marc Crawford

== Milestones ==
=== Debuts ===
The following are players of note who played their first NHL game in 2005-06:

- Alex Burrows, Vancouver Canucks
- Dustin Byfuglien, Chicago Blackhawks
- Jeff Carter, Philadelphia Flyers
- Matthew Carle, San Jose Sharks
- Braydon Coburn, Atlanta Thrashers
- Corey Crawford, Chicago Blackhawks
- Sidney Crosby, Pittsburgh Penguins
- Ryan Getzlaf, Mighty Ducks of Anaheim
- Mark Giordano, Calgary Flames
- Mike Green, Washington Capitals
- Duncan Keith, Chicago Blackhawks
- Andrew Ladd, Carolina Hurricanes
- Henrik Lundqvist, New York Rangers
- Alexander Ovechkin, Washington Capitals
- Zach Parise, New Jersey Devils
- Dustin Penner, Mighty Ducks of Anaheim
- Corey Perry, Mighty Ducks of Anaheim
- Dion Phaneuf, Calgary Flames
- Mike Richards, Philadelphia Flyers
- Pekka Rinne, Nashville Predators
- Brent Seabrook, Chicago Blackhawks
- Alexander Steen, Toronto Maple Leafs
- Ryan Suter, Nashville Predators
- Maxime Talbot, Pittsburgh Penguins
- Thomas Vanek, Buffalo Sabres
- Cam Ward, Carolina Hurricanes
- Shea Weber, Nashville Predators

=== Last games ===
The following is a list of players of note who played their last NHL game in 2005–06, listed with their team:

- Tommy Albelin, New Jersey Devils
- Dave Andreychuk, Tampa Bay Lightning
- Andrew Cassels, Washington Capitals
- Eric Daze, Chicago Blackhawks
- Eric Desjardins, Philadelphia Flyers
- Tie Domi, Toronto Maple Leafs
- Brett Hull, Phoenix Coyotes
- Alexander Karpovtsev, Florida Panthers
- Brian Leetch, Boston Bruins
- Mario Lemieux, Pittsburgh Penguins
- Alexander Mogilny, New Jersey Devils
- Zigmund Palffy, Pittsburgh Penguins
- Keith Primeau, Philadelphia Flyers
- Luc Robitaille, Los Angeles Kings
- Steve Yzerman, Detroit Red Wings
- Alexei Zhamnov, Boston Bruins

== Broadcasting rights ==
In Canada, CBC and TSN resumed their coverage of the NHL after the lockout. CBC aired Saturday night Hockey Night in Canada regular season games, while TSN's coverage included Wednesday Night Hockey and other selected weeknights. During the first three rounds of the Stanley Cup playoffs, TSN televised all-U.S. games while CBC aired all games involving Canadian teams. CBC then had exclusive coverage of the Stanley Cup Finals.

In the U.S., NBC began its first season as the league's over-the-air partner after initially signing its contract prior to the lockout. NBC's deal involved a revenue sharing agreement with the NHL as opposed to a traditional rights fee, and included rights to six weekend regular season windows, seven weekend postseason broadcasts and games 3–7 of the Stanley Cup Finals. However, ESPN exercised it opt-out clause after the lockout, leaving the NHL without a U.S. cable partner. In August 2005, Comcast (who owns the Philadelphia Flyers) signed a three-year deal to put games on its Outdoor Life Network (OLN). The agreement called for 54 or more games each regular season, generally on Monday and Tuesday nights. Due to the abbreviated off-season, the 2005–06 regular season schedule did not offer OLN exclusivity, which they received in 2006–07. Comcast high-speed cable internet customers could watch at least seven games a week over the Internet as part of the new TV deal. OLN also televised selected first and second round playoff games, all Conference Finals games not aired on NBC, and the first two games of the Stanley Cup Finals. The relationship lasted 15 years (concluding at the end of the 2020–21 NHL season), until the NHL on ABC and ESPN returned in 2021–22.

== See also ==
- List of Stanley Cup champions
- 2005 NHL entry draft
- 2006 Stanley Cup playoffs
- 2005-06 NHL transactions
- NHL All-Rookie Team
- Ice hockey at the 2006 Winter Olympics
- 2006 Men's World Ice Hockey Championships
- Lester Patrick Trophy
- 2005 in sports
- 2006 in sports
