= Mike Sullivan (ice hockey) =

American ice hockey player and coach (born 1968)

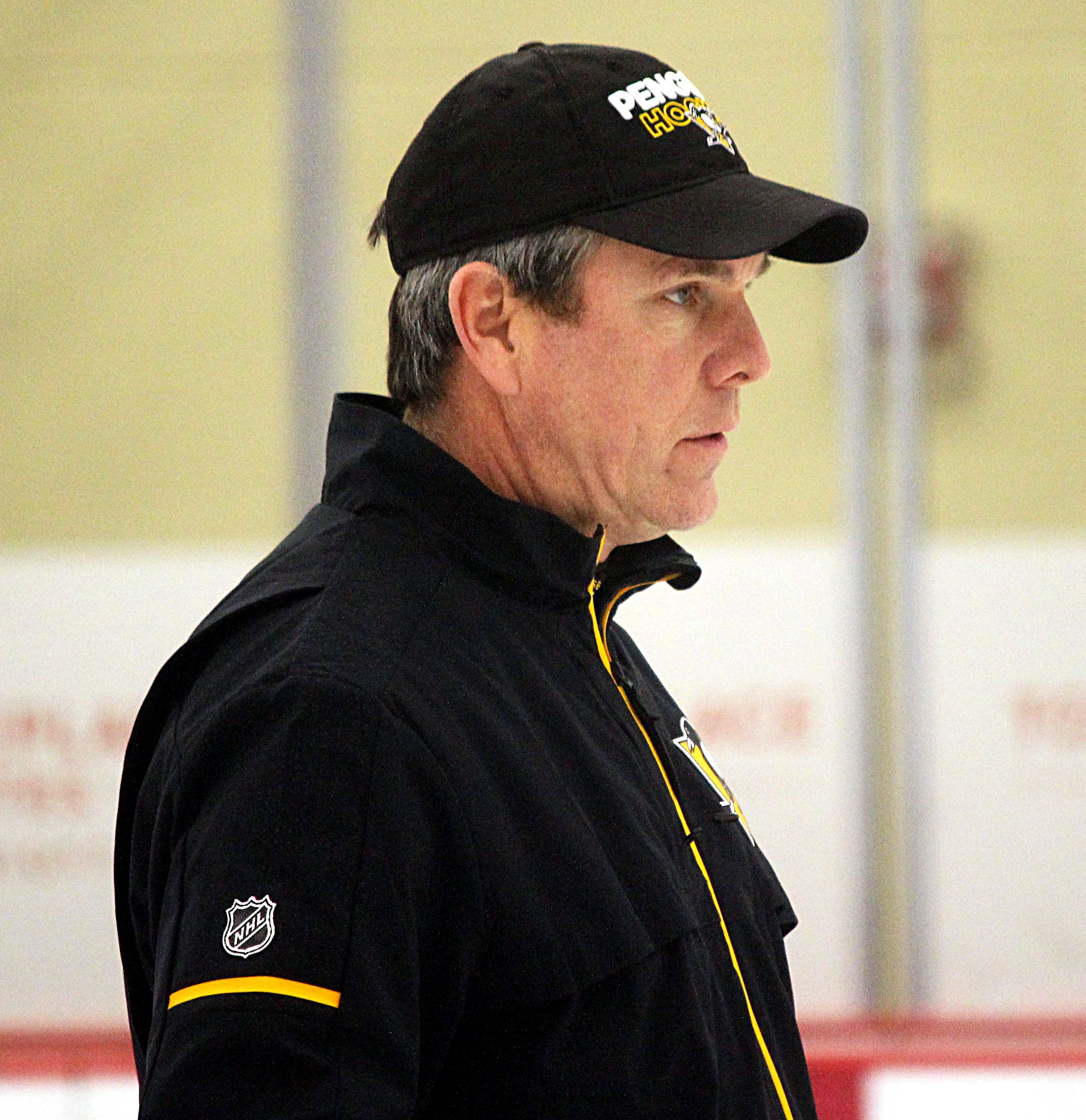
- Sullivan in 2018
- Born: February 27, 1968 (age 58) Marshfield, Massachusetts, U.S.
- Height: 6 ft 2 in (188 cm)
- Weight: 185 lb (84 kg; 13 st 3 lb)
- Position: Center
- Shot: Left
- Played for: San Jose Sharks; Calgary Flames; Boston Bruins; Phoenix Coyotes
- Current NHL coach: New York Rangers
- Coached for: Boston Bruins; Pittsburgh Penguins
- National team: United States
- NHL draft: 69th overall, 1987; New York Rangers
- Playing career: 1990–2002
- Coaching career: 2002–present
Medal record
Head coach for the United States
Winter Olympics
Gold medal – first place	2026 Milano Cortina	Team

Michael Barry Sullivan (born February 27, 1968) is an American professional ice hockey coach and former player who is the head coach for the New York Rangers of the National Hockey League (NHL). He was selected in the fourth round, 69th overall, by the New York Rangers in the 1987 NHL entry draft. Sullivan has also played for the San Jose Sharks, Calgary Flames, Boston Bruins, and Phoenix Coyotes. Internationally, he represented the United States twice, including at the 1997 World Championship.

Sullivan turned to coaching upon his retirement in 2002 and served two seasons as the head coach of the Boston Bruins between 2003 and 2005. He served as an assistant coach with the Tampa Bay Lightning, New York Rangers, and Vancouver Canucks, and subsequently in player development with the Chicago Blackhawks for one year. After serving as head coach of the Wilkes-Barre/Scranton Penguins, he took over as head coach of the Pittsburgh Penguins in December 2015, and led the team to back-to-back Stanley Cup championships in 2016 and 2017, becoming the only American-born coach to win the Stanley Cup more than once. He was fired by the Penguins after the 2024–25 season, and was subsequently hired as the head coach of the Rangers.

Sullivan was named head coach of the United States men's national ice hockey team for the 2022 Winter Olympics, but with the NHL withdrawing from the Olympics due to a COVID-19 surge, David Quinn, former head coach of the New York Rangers, was named as his replacement. He coached the United States in the 4 Nations Face-Off in 2025, where they finished in second place. Sullivan subsequently coached the U.S men's team to a gold medal at the 2026 Winter Olympics, the first gold medal for the U.S men's team since 1980 and third overall.

== Early life ==
Sullivan was born on February 27, 1968, in Marshfield, Massachusetts to Irish-American parents George and Myrna. Sullivan is their second youngest child and played hockey growing up under the tutelage of his father. While Sullivan and his brothers played hockey, his two sisters Kathie and Debbie figure skated.

== Playing career ==
Sullivan played high school hockey at Boston College High School and college hockey at Boston University where he scored a game-winning goal in the Beanpot Tournament. He was drafted 69th overall by the New York Rangers in the 1987 NHL entry draft. He elected to remain at BU to finish school, and in 1990, he began an 11-year National Hockey League career in which he accumulated 54 goals, 82 assists, 136 points and 203 penalty minutes in 709 games.

== Coaching career ==
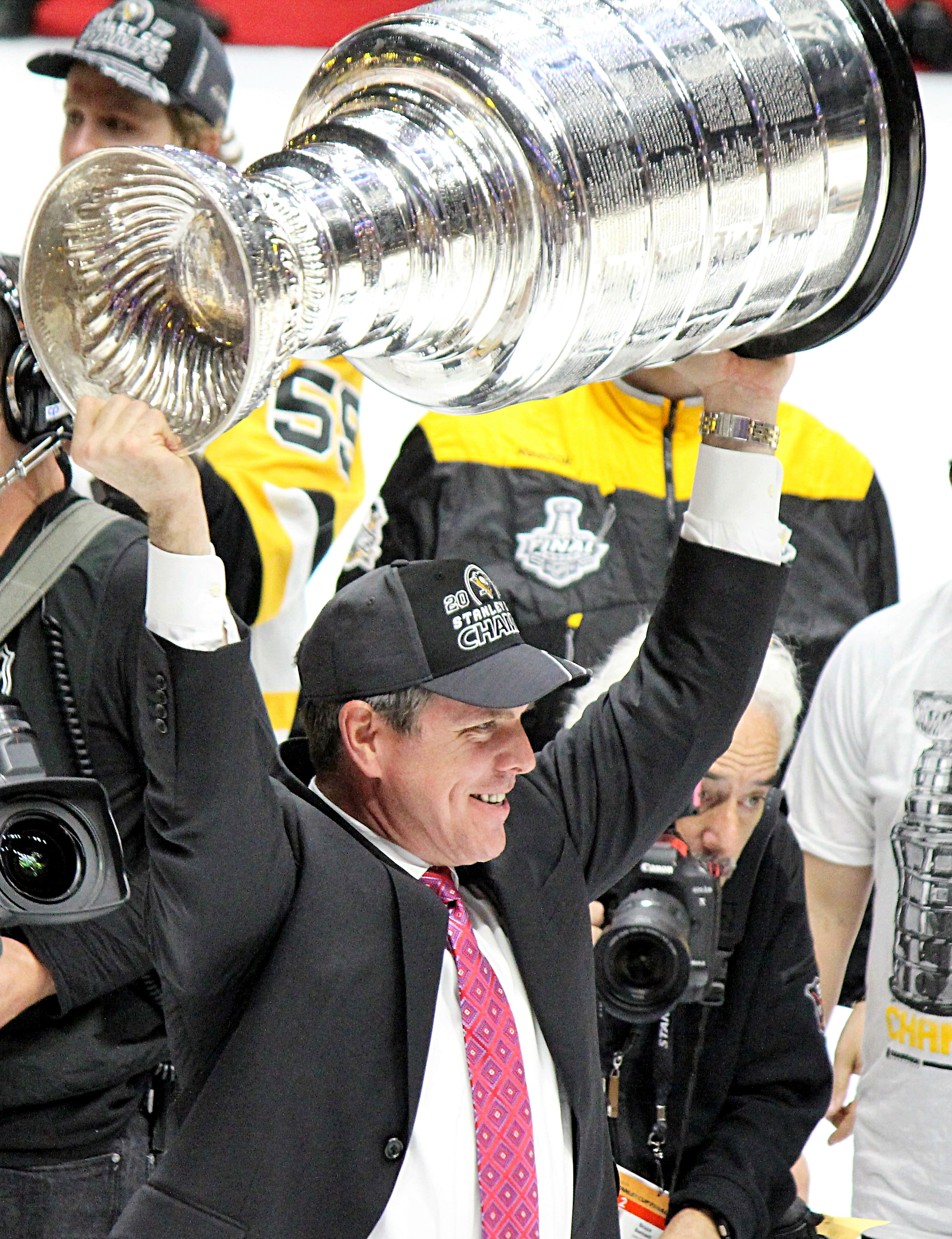
Sullivan raising the Stanley Cup in 2017

Sullivan began coaching professional hockey during the 2002–03 season, when he became the head coach of the Providence Bruins of the American Hockey League (AHL). In his only season, his team had a 41–17–9–4 record.

Sullivan was hired as the 26th head coach of the Boston Bruins in 2003 by then-general manager Mike O'Connell. His first season with the Bruins was highly successful, as he led them to a 41–19–15–7 record, 104 points and a first-place finish in the Northeast Division. However, they were eliminated in the conference quarterfinals of the 2004 Stanley Cup playoffs by the Montreal Canadiens. After the 2004–05 NHL lockout, Sullivan and the Bruins struggled to win in the new NHL, as they ended the 2005–06 season with a dismal 29–37–16 record, missing the playoffs and finishing last in the Northeast Division. He was subsequently fired by the incoming general manager Peter Chiarelli on June 27, 2006, and was replaced by Dave Lewis.

Sullivan served as an assistant coach of the U.S. Olympic hockey team at the 2006 Winter Olympics.

On May 31, 2007, he was named assistant coach of the Tampa Bay Lightning. He was then promoted to associate coach the following season. On July 16, 2009, he was named assistant coach of the New York Rangers.

On July 3, 2013, he was named assistant coach of the Vancouver Canucks. On January 20, 2014, Sullivan was named interim head coach of the Canucks, while head coach John Tortorella served a six-game suspension. On January 21, in his first game as acting head coach, the Canucks would go on to record a 2–1 victory over the Edmonton Oilers. On May 1, Sullivan, along with head coach Tortorella, were relieved of their respective duties in the Canucks organization. Sullivan subsequently joined the Chicago Blackhawks as a player development coach.

On June 18, 2015, the Pittsburgh Penguins named Sullivan as the new head coach of their American Hockey League affiliate, the Wilkes-Barre/Scranton Penguins. He was named head coach of the Pittsburgh Penguins on December 12, 2015, upon the firing of Mike Johnston. On June 12, 2016, Sullivan became just the sixth head coach in NHL history to win the Stanley Cup after being hired mid-season. He did so when the Penguins defeated the San Jose Sharks in the 2016 Stanley Cup Final. Sullivan joined both Scotty Bowman (1992) and Dan Bylsma (2009) as the third coach in franchise history (and the sixth in NHL history) to win the Stanley Cup following a mid-season coaching change. Sullivan is also the first coach to lead the Penguins to consecutive Stanley Cup championships with their victory over the Nashville Predators in the 2017 Stanley Cup Final, and is the only American-born head coach to win the Stanley Cup multiple times.

On December 16, 2017, he recorded his 100th career win with the Penguins becoming just the fourth coach to do so for the organization.

On July 5, 2019, Sullivan signed a four-year contract extension.

After a 5–2 win against the Chicago Blackhawks on October 16, 2021, Sullivan became the winningest coach in the Penguins history, surpassing Dan Bylsma's record with 253 wins behind the Penguins bench.

On April 12, 2023, with the New York Islanders victory over the Montreal Canadiens, the Penguins missed the playoffs for the first time since the 2005–06 season.

After 10 seasons as head coach, Sullivan was relieved of his coaching duties with the Penguins on April 28, 2025. His dismissal came following the 2024–25 season, where the team failed to qualify for the playoffs for the third straight season.

On May 2, 2025, Sullivan was named the head coach of the New York Rangers.

Sullivan served as the head coach of the U.S. Olympic hockey team at the 2026 Winter Olympics. Sullivan recruited his mentor John Tortorella to serve as an assistant coach. The United States won the gold medal, defeating Canada 2–1 in overtime.

On September 29, 2026, Sullivan coached his 1,000th NHL regular season game as the Rangers lost 3–0 to the Bruins in season opening game.

== Career statistics ==
=== Regular season and playoffs ===
			Regular season					Playoffs
Season	Team	League	GP	G	A	Pts	PIM	GP	G	A	Pts	PIM
1985–86	Boston College High School	HS–Prep	22	26	33	59	—	—	—	—	—	—
1986–87	Boston University	HE	37	13	18	31	18	—	—	—	—	—
1987–88	Boston University	HE	30	18	22	40	30	—	—	—	—	—
1988–89	Boston University	HE	36	19	17	36	30	—	—	—	—	—
1989–90	Boston University	HE	38	11	20	31	26	—	—	—	—	—
1990–91	San Diego Gulls	IHL	74	12	23	35	27	—	—	—	—	—
1991–92	San Jose Sharks	NHL	64	8	11	19	15	—	—	—	—	—
1991–92	Kansas City Blades	IHL	10	2	8	10	8	—	—	—	—	—
1992–93	San Jose Sharks	NHL	81	6	8	14	30	—	—	—	—	—
1993–94	San Jose Sharks	NHL	26	2	2	4	4	—	—	—	—	—
1993–94	Kansas City Blades	IHL	6	3	3	6	0	—	—	—	—	—
1993–94	Saint John Flames	AHL	5	2	0	2	4	—	—	—	—	—
1993–94	Calgary Flames	NHL	19	2	3	5	6	7	1	1	2	8
1994–95	Calgary Flames	NHL	38	4	7	11	14	7	3	5	8	2
1995–96	Calgary Flames	NHL	81	9	12	21	24	4	0	0	0	0
1996–97	Calgary Flames	NHL	67	5	6	11	10	—	—	—	—	—
1997–98	Boston Bruins	NHL	77	5	13	18	34	6	0	1	1	2
1998–99	Phoenix Coyotes	NHL	63	2	4	6	24	5	0	0	0	2
1999–00	Phoenix Coyotes	NHL	79	5	10	15	10	5	0	1	1	0
2000–01	Phoenix Coyotes	NHL	72	5	4	9	16	—	—	—	—	—
2001–02	Phoenix Coyotes	NHL	42	1	2	3	16	—	—	—	—	—
NHL totals			709	54	82	136	203	34	4	8	12	14

=== International ===
Year	Team	Event	GP	G	A	Pts	PIM
1988	United States	WJC	6	0	2	2	14
1997	United States	WC	8	1	2	3	2
Junior totals			6	0	2	2	14
Senior totals			8	1	2	3	2

== Head coaching record ==
=== NHL ===
Team	Year	Regular season							Postseason			
Team	Year	G	W	L	T	OTL	Pts	Finish	W	L	Win%	Result
BOS	2003–04	82	41	19	15	7	104	1st in Northeast	3	4	.429	Lost in conference quarterfinals (MTL)
BOS	2005–06	82	29	37	—	16	74	5th in Northeast	—	—	—	Missed playoffs
BOS total		164	70	56	15	23			3	4	.429	1 playoff appearance
PIT	2015–16	54	33	16	—	5	71	2nd in Metropolitan	16	8	.667	Won Stanley Cup (SJS)
PIT	2016–17	82	50	21	—	11	111	2nd in Metropolitan	16	9	.640	Won Stanley Cup (NSH)
PIT	2017–18	82	47	29	—	6	100	2nd in Metropolitan	6	6	.500	Lost in second round (WSH)
PIT	2018–19	82	44	26	—	12	100	3rd in Metropolitan	0	4	.000	Lost in first round (NYI)
PIT	2019–20	69*	40	23	—	6	86	3rd in Metropolitan	1	3	.250	Lost in qualifying round (MTL)
PIT	2020–21	56	37	16	—	3	77	1st in East	2	4	.333	Lost in first round (NYI)
PIT	2021–22	82	46	25	—	11	103	3rd in Metropolitan	3	4	.429	Lost in first round (NYR)
PIT	2022–23	82	40	31	—	11	91	5th in Metropolitan	—	—	—	Missed playoffs
PIT	2023–24	82	38	32	—	12	88	5th in Metropolitan	—	—	—	Missed playoffs
PIT	2024–25	82	34	36	—	12	80	7th in Metropolitan	—	—	—	Missed playoffs
PIT total		753	409	255	—	89			44	38	.537	7 playoff appearances 2 Stanley Cup titles
NYR	2025–26	82	34	39	—	9	77	8th in Metropolitan	—	—	—	Missed playoffs
NYR total		82	34	39	—	9			—	—	—	
NHL total		999	513	350	15	121			47	42	.528	8 playoff appearances 2 Stanley Cup titles

- Shortened season due to the COVID-19 pandemic during the 2019–20 season. Playoffs were played in August 2020 with a different format.

=== AHL ===
Team	Year	Regular season							Postseason
Team	Year	G	W	L	T	OTL	Pts	Finish	Result
Providence Bruins	2002–03	71	41	17	9	4	104	1st in North	Lost in Conference quarterfinals (MTB)
Wilkes-Barre/Scranton Penguins	2015–16	23	18	5	—	—	41	—	Promoted to Pittsburgh

Sporting positions
Preceded by Bill Armstrong	Head coach of the Providence Bruins; 2002–2003	Succeeded by Scott Gordon
Preceded by Mike O'Connell	Head coach of the Boston Bruins; 2003–2006	Succeeded by Dave Lewis
Preceded by Mike Johnston	Head coach of the Pittsburgh Penguins; 2015–2025	Succeeded by Dan Muse
Preceded by Peter Laviolette	Head coach of the New York Rangers; 2025–present	Incumbent
