= Michael G. Sullivan =

Canadian biologist specialising in fisheries, wildlife, and land use management

- Education: PhD, University of Alberta; BS and MS University of Alberta;
- Organization(s): Alberta Environment and Parks, Government of Alberta (Fisheries Science Specialist); Parks Canada (advisor); North American Journal of Fisheries Management (Associate Editor); University of Alberta (Adjunct professor); Royal Roads University (Adjunct Professor)
- Known for: Fisheries, wildlife and landuse management, fish conservation, human impact on aquatic ecosystems

Michael G. Sullivan is a Canadian biologist specializing in fisheries, wildlife, and land use management. He is known for his role in the active recovery of Alberta's collapsed walleye population. He currently serves as the provincial fish science specialist for Alberta Environment and Protected Areas

== Biography ==
=== Career ===
In 1983, Sullivan started as a junior biologist with the Government of Alberta. He currently serves as the provincial fish science specialist for Alberta Environment and Protected Areas. His main area of expertise is in fisheries management, but he has also contributed to caribou studies and management in Alberta and British Columbia. He was part of the team that worked on restoring Alberta's collapsed walleye populations

In the mid-1990s Sullivan began serving as an advisor to Parks Canada. in the western national parks. He has been a member of the North American Journal of Fisheries Management Editorial board, serving two terms as the associate editor. Sullivan is adjunct professor at several universities including the University of Alberta , Simon Fraser University and Royal Roads University, where he has acted as a supervisor to graduate students. Sullivan has delivered lectures in several programs at those universities as well as being an invited lecturer at NAIT and the University of Calgary. Sullivan also serves on various projects at the ALCES, a group which provides landuse and resource solutions

=== Significant contributions ===
Sullivan was part of the team that helped restore Alberta fish populations to support sustainable harvest by traditional use and recreational fisheries. Native fish in Alberta were over-harvested for decades. Many species including walleye, pike, whitefish, yellow perch and lake trout have populations that are still recovering. Since Alberta is somewhat scarce in waterbodies compared to the rest of Canada with relatively high fishing effort (estimated 315 anglers per lake, compared to 2 in SK, 2 in MN, and 6 in ON), and has a relatively short fishing season, the fisheries are vulnerable to overharvest. Sullivan was part of the team of biologists at the Government of Alberta that developed an adaptive management framework consisting of four main management objectives related to: i) first nations, ii) ecosystem iii) fish habitat and iv) recreation fisheries informed by the Fish Sustainability Index, a "report card" approach to assessing the resiliency and sustainability of fish stocks by assessing several key metrics, relying on data collected by standardized sampling methods.

Sullivan’s broader contributions are diverse and reflect his passion for fisheries science. These activities include helping shape policy frameworks linking First Nations objectives, ecosystem health, and recreational fisheries. Sullivan regularly participates in public science communication through news stories, online videos , community meetings , lectures, government updates, and collaborative outreach on many important topics like native trout fishery recovery.

=== Honours ===
- In 2022, Sullivan received the Queen's Platinum Jubilee Medal (Alberta)
- In 2019, Sullivan received the Award of Excellence from the Fisheries Management Section. of the American Fisheries Society.
- In 2018, Sullivan was selected to give the Martha Kostuch Annual Lecture for the Alberta Wilderness Association
- In 2017, Sullivan received the Alberta Chapter of The Wildlife Society Willian Rowan Distinguished Service Award
- In 2015, Sullivan received the Alberta Chapter of The Wildlife Society Outreach Award

=== Volunteerism ===
Through his career with the Alberta Government, Sullivan has completed numerous occupational health and safety training courses. These safety training courses are applied volunteering at local events and as a volunteer member of the Canadian Ski Patrol. He volunteers at the River Edge Ultra Running Race, a 100 km running race near Devon where runners wade to an island on the North Saskatchewan River, requiring (potential) river rescuers

=== Selected publications ===
==== Journal publications ====
- Cahill, C. L., Walters, C. J., Paul, A. J., Sullivan, M. G., & Post, J. R. (2022). Unveiling the recovery dynamics of Walleye after the invisible collapse. Canadian Journal of Fisheries and Aquatic Sciences, 79(5), 708-723.https://doi.org/10.1139/cjfas-2021-0065
- Paul, A. J., Cahill, C. L., MacPherson, L., Sullivan, M. G., & Brown, M. R. (2021). Are Alberta’s Northern Pike Populations at Risk from Walleye Recovery?. North American Journal of Fisheries Management, 41(2), 399-409. https://doi.org/10.1002/nafm.10520
- Joubert, B. A., Sullivan, M. G., Kissinger, B. C., & Meinke, A. T. (2020). Can smartphones kill Trout? Mortality of memorable-sized Bull Trout (Salvelinus confluentus) after photo-releases. Fisheries Research, 223, 105458.https://doi.org/10.1016/j.fishres.2019.105458
- MacPherson, L., Sullivan, M., Reilly, J., & Paul, A. (2020). Alberta's fisheries sustainability assessment: a guide to assessing population status, and quantifying cumulative effects using the joe modelling technique. Canadian Science Advisory Secretariat (CSAS).
- Watkins, Owen B.; Paul, Andrew J.; Spencer, Stephen C.; Sullivan, Michael G.; Foote, Lee (2019). "Dude, Where's my Transmitter? Probability of Radio Transmitter Detections and Locational Errors for Tracking River Fish". North American Journal of Fisheries Management. 39 (4): 753–761. Bibcode:2019NAJFM..39..753W. doi:10.1002/nafm.10307. ISSN 1548-8675. S2CID 191163731.
- Mogensen, Stephanie; Post, John R.; Sullivan, Michael G. (2013-11-29). "Vulnerability to harvest by anglers differs across climate, productivity, and diversity clines". Canadian Journal of Fisheries and Aquatic Sciences. 71 (3): 416–426. doi:10.1139/cjfas-2013-0336. ISSN 0706-652X.
- Patterson, W. F., & Sullivan, M. G. (2013). Testing and refining the assumptions of put-and-take rainbow trout fisheries in Alberta. Human Dimensions of Wildlife, 18(5), 340-354.
- MacPherson, Laura M.; Sullivan, Michael G.; Foote, A. Lee; Stevens, Cameron E. (2012). "Effects of Culverts on Stream Fish Assemblages in the Alberta Foothills". North American Journal of Fisheries Management. 32 (3): 480–490. Bibcode:2012NAJFM..32..480M. doi:10.1080/02755947.2012.686004. ISSN 1548-8675.
- Macpherson, Laura, Sullivan, Michael G., Foote, Lee and Stevens, Cameron E. 2011. “How Road Networks Affect Stream Fish Assemblages.” In proceedings of the American Fisheries Society 140th Annual Meeting.
- Stevens, Cameron E.; Council, Trevor; Sullivan, Michael G. (2010-02-01). "Influences of Human Stressors on Fish-Based Metrics for Assessing River Condition in Central Alberta". Water Quality Research Journal. 45 (1): 35–46. doi:10.2166/wqrj.2010.005. ISSN 1201-3080.
- Walker, Jordan R.; Foote, Lee; Sullivan, Michael G. (2007-11-01). "Effectiveness of Enforcement to Deter Illegal Angling Harvest of Northern Pike in Alberta". North American Journal of Fisheries Management. 27 (4): 1369–1377. Bibcode:2007NAJFM..27.1369W. doi:10.1577/M06-011.1. ISSN 0275-5947.
- Sullivan, Michael G. (2002). "Illegal Angling Harvest of Walleyes Protected by Length Limits in Alberta". North American Journal of Fisheries Management. 22 (3): 1053. doi:10.1577/1548-8675(2002)022<1053:IAHOWP>2.0.CO;2. ISSN 1548-8675.
- Sullivan, Michael G. (2003). "Active Management of Walleye Fisheries in Alberta: Dilemmas of Managing Recovering Fisheries". North American Journal of Fisheries Management. 23 (4): 1343–1358. Bibcode:2003NAJFM..23.1343S. doi:10.1577/M01-232AM.
- Sullivan, Michael G. (2003-05-01). "Exaggeration of Walleye Catches by Alberta Anglers". North American Journal of Fisheries Management. 23 (2): 573–580. doi:10.1577/1548-8675(2003)023<0573:EOWCBA>2.0.CO;2. ISSN 0275-5947.
- Post, John R.; Sullivan, Michael; Cox, Sean; Lester, Nigel P.; Walters, Carl J.; Parkinson, Eric A.; Paul, Andrew J.; Jackson, Leyland; Shuter, Brian J. (2002-01-01). "Canada's Recreational Fisheries: The Invisible Collapse?". Fisheries. 27 (1): 6–17. doi:10.1577/1548-8446(2002)027<0006:CRF>2.0.CO;2. ISSN 0363-2415.
- Sullivan, M. G. (1985). Population regulation of northern pike (Esox lucius L.) in an unexploited lake in Northern Saskatchewan. https://ualberta.scholaris.ca/bitstreams/3f4a5420-3b71-48d7-aad4-b60d56743742/download

==== Textbook publications ====
- van Poorten, B.T., M.G. Sullivan, T. Godin, E. Parkinson, T.D. Davies, and J.R. Post. 2023. "Status and Management of Freshwater Fisheries Resources in Western Canada (Alberta and British Columbia)". Pages 139-176 in C.T. HAsler, J.G. Imhof, N.E. Mandrak, and S.J. Cooke, editors. Freshwater fisheries in Canada: historical and contemporary perspectives on the resources and their management. American Fisheries Society, Bethesda, Maryland. doi.org/10.47886/9781934874707
- Sullivan, Michael G. 2019. "Case Study - Walleye". 293-299. In Schneider, R.R., (editor). Biodiversity conservation in Canada: from theory to practice. The Canadian Center for the Translation of Ecology. Edmonton, AB.
- Sullivan, Michael G., Propst, David, and Gould, Bill. 2009 “Fish of the Rockies: including best fishing sites.” Edmonton, AB: Lone Pine Publishing
- Foote, A. L., and M. G. Sullivan. 2005. "The future of wildlife and fisheries management in Alberta: the promise in our young biologists". 409 – 411. In P Rowell and M. J. Pybus (editors). Fish, fur and feathers: fish and wildlife conservation in Alberta 1905 – 2005. Fish and Wildlife Historical Society and Federation of Alberta Naturalists, Edmonton, AB.
- Joynt, Amanda, and Sullivan, Michael G. 2003. “Fish of Alberta” Edmonton, AB: Lone Pine Publishing
