= Marco Sturm =

German ice hockey player and coach

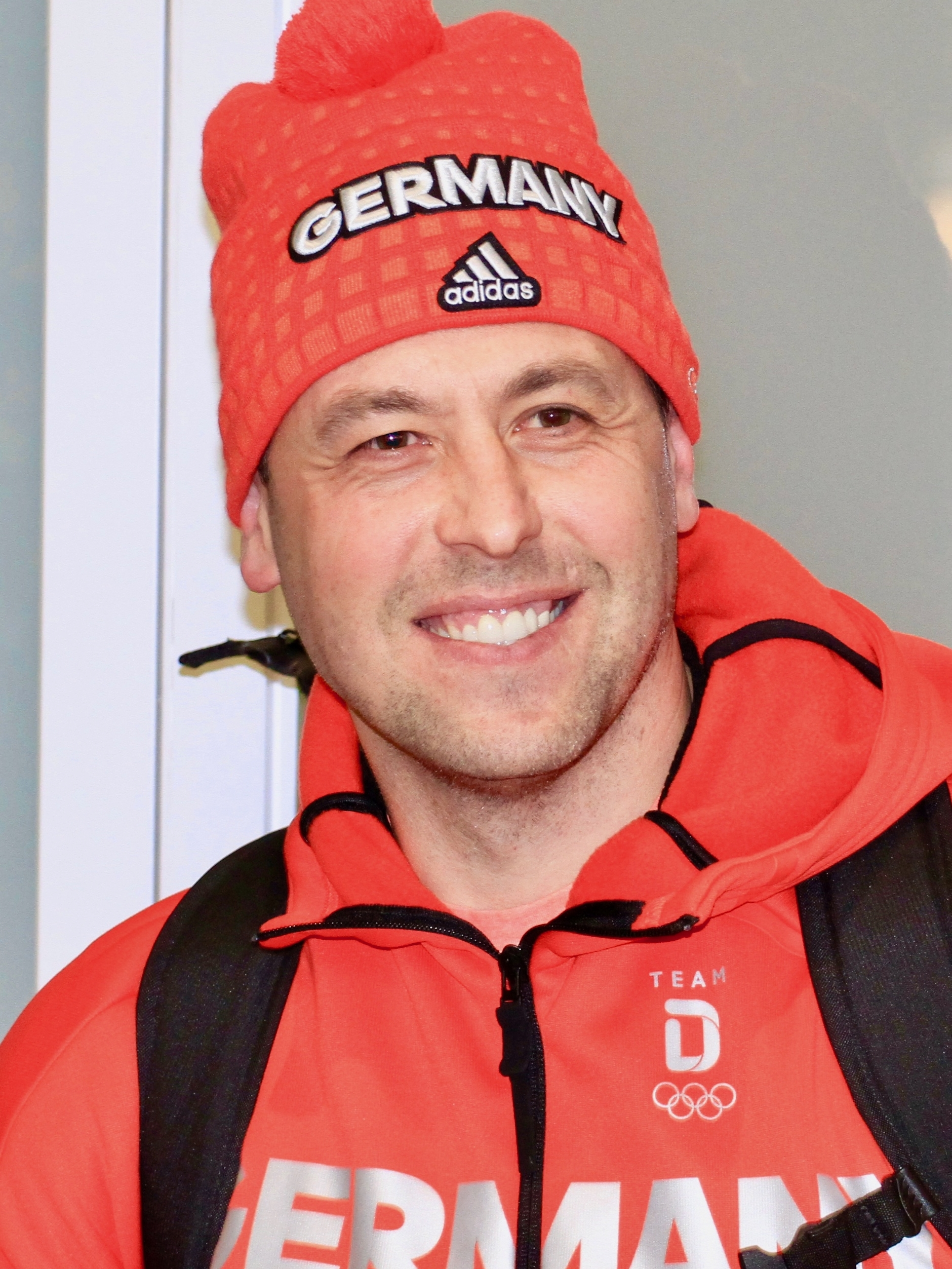
- Sturm in 2018
- Born: September 8, 1978 (age 48) Dingolfing, West Germany
- Height: 6 ft 0 in (183 cm)
- Weight: 196 lb (89 kg; 14 st 0 lb)
- Position: Forward
- Shot: Left
- Played for: EV Landshut; San Jose Sharks; ERC Ingolstadt; Boston Bruins; Los Angeles Kings; Washington Capitals; Vancouver Canucks; Florida Panthers; Kölner Haie
- Current NHL coach: Boston Bruins
- National team: Germany
- NHL draft: 21st overall, 1996; San Jose Sharks
- Playing career: 1995–2013
- Coaching career: 2016–present

Marco Johann Sturm (born September 8, 1978) is a German professional ice hockey coach and former player who is the head coach for the Boston Bruins of the National Hockey League (NHL). As a forward, he played in the NHL and Deutsche Eishockey Liga from 1995 to 2013.

Sturm began his career with the German club EV Landshut, playing with the team from 1995 to 1997. Selected 21st overall in the 1996 NHL entry draft by the San Jose Sharks, he played his rookie season with the team in 1997–98. After eight-and-a-half seasons with the Sharks, he was traded to the Boston Bruins as part of a package deal for Joe Thornton in November 2005. Sturm remained with Boston until 2010–11, when he split the campaign with the Los Angeles Kings and Washington Capitals. He signed with the Vancouver Canucks as an unrestricted free agent in July 2011, but was quickly traded to the Florida Panthers less than a month into the subsequent season.

A one-time NHL All-Star (1999), Sturm established himself as a consistent 20-goal scorer in the league, achieving the mark seven of eight times between 2001–02 and 2009–10. He was the most productive German player in the league until Leon Draisaitl surpassed him in 2021. Internationally, Sturm competed for Germany in four IIHF World Championships, two Winter Olympics, and one World Cup.

== Playing career ==
=== EV Landshut (1995–1997) ===
After playing in EV Landshut's junior program in Germany, he joined the club's premier Deutsche Eishockey Liga team for the 1995–96 season. At 17 years old, he recorded 12 goals and 32 points over 47 games as a rookie. On a team basis, EV Landshut came within three points of the regular season title. During the off-season, he was selected by the San Jose Sharks in the first round, 21st overall, of the 1996 NHL entry draft. Returning to Germany for one more season with EV Landshut, he improved to 16 goals and 43 points over 46 games, ranking fourth in team scoring.

=== San Jose Sharks (1997–2005) ===
In July 1997, Sturm signed his first NHL contract with the Sharks. Making the team out of training camp, he was scratched for the first game of the 1997–98 season. The following game, he dressed and scored his first career NHL goal against Jeff Hackett of the Chicago Blackhawks on October 4, 1997. His goal, a game-winner, came on a breakaway after exiting the penalty box and broke a 2–2 tie. Following his second month of NHL play, Sturm was already establishing himself in the NHL as a defensively responsible, two-way forward, and was second among league rookies in scoring to Toronto Maple Leafs forward Mike Johnson. Consequently, he was named the league's rookie of the month for November 1997. He finished the season with 30 (10 goals and 20 assists) points over 74 games, ranking fifth in scoring among league rookies. Finishing with the eighth and final seed in the Western Conference, the Sharks qualified for the playoffs for the first time in three years. Facing the Dallas Stars in the first round, they were eliminated in six games. Sturm appeared in two post-season games, recording no points.

The following season, Sturm was named to the 1999 NHL All-Star Game. Competing with Team World, (Note: The NHL All-Star Game in 1999 operated in a North America vs. the World format, in which players were divided according to nationality.) he finished with the second best time in the Skills Competition's fastest skater segment, circling the rink in 14.654 seconds, 14 hundredths of a second slower than the Washington Capitals' Peter Bondra. Sturm later scored a goal in a losing cause as North America beat Team World by an 8–6 score. Playing in his second NHL season, Sturm improved to 16 goals and 38 points over 78 games. Late in the campaign, he suffered a hyper-extended knee during a game against the Edmonton Oilers on April 12, 1999. He missed the final two games of the regular season, but returned in time for the 1999 playoffs. He added 2 goals and 4 points over 6 games as the Sharks were eliminated in the first round by the Colorado Avalanche.

In the next two seasons, Sturm recorded points totals of 27 and 32. He helped the Sharks advance to the second round of the 2000 playoffs, defeating the St. Louis Blues in seven games before being eliminated by the Stars. In 2001–02, Sturm reached the 40-plus mark in points with 21 goals and 20 assists. His efforts helped the Sharks win the Pacific Division for the first time in team history. They went on to lose in the second round of the 2002 playoffs to the Colorado Avalanche. During the off-season, he was re-signed by the Sharks to a one-year contract on July 1, 2002. The following campaign, he recorded 28 goals and 48 points, his highest totals as a Shark, earning him a two-year contract with the team, signed on July 16, 2003. However, the Sharks missed the playoffs for the first time in Sturm's tenure in San Jose, finishing second-last in the West.

Sturm was on pace for another career year in 2003–04 when he suffered a season-ending knee injury on March 5, 2004. Missing the last 15 games of the regular season, he recorded 21 goals and 41 points over 64 games. In Sturm's absence, the Sharks qualified for the Western Conference Finals during the 2004 playoffs for the first time in team history, but lost to the Calgary Flames in six games. Due to the NHL lockout, Sturm played the 2004–05 season back in Germany with ERC Ingolstadt of the Deutsche Eishockey Liga. He recorded 38 points (22 goals and 16 assists) over 64 regular season games, then helped his team to the playoff semifinals.

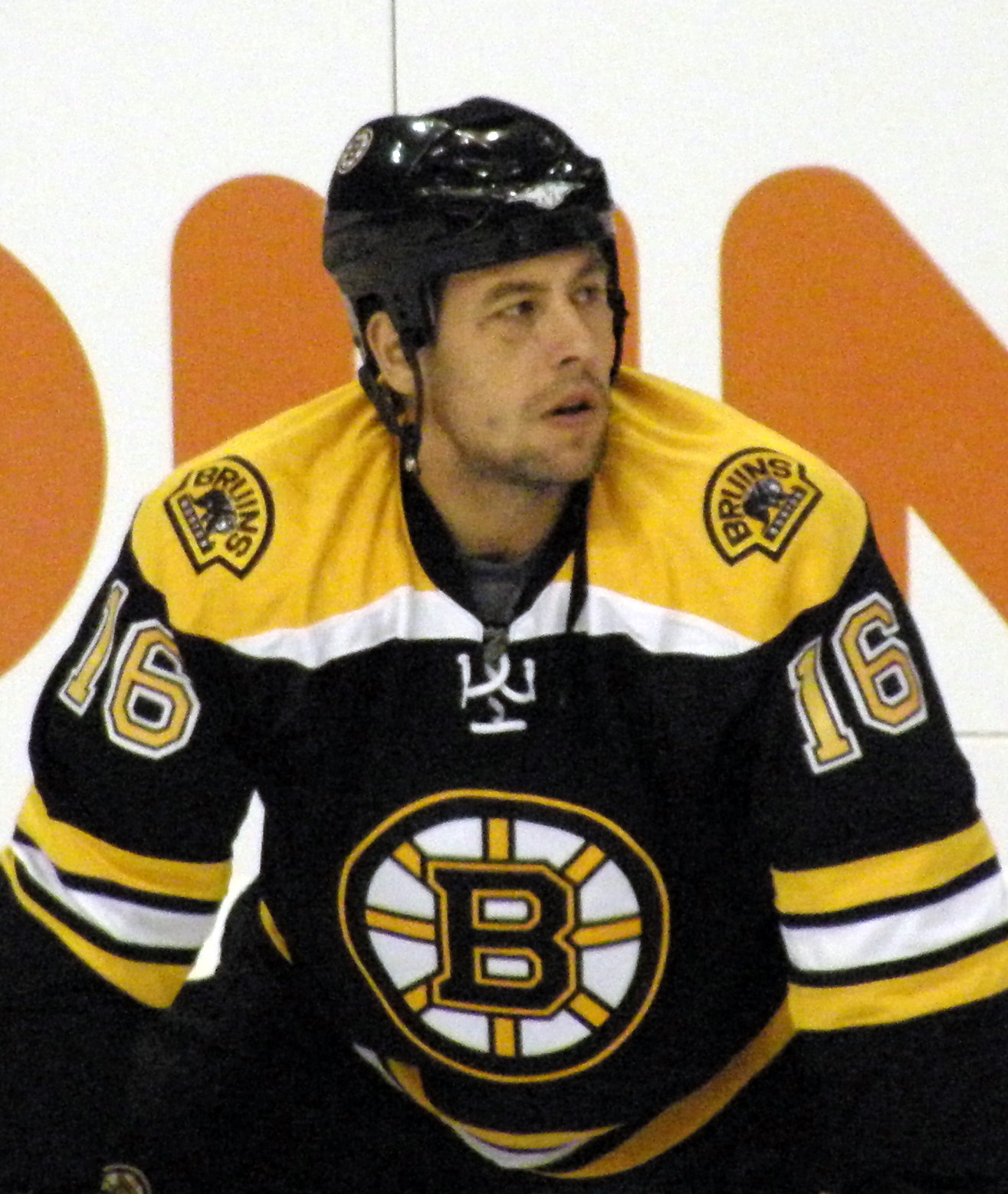
Sturm in 2007 with the Boston Bruins

Returning to the Sharks as NHL play resumed for the 2005–06 season, Sturm was then traded to the Boston Bruins on November 30, 2005, along with defenceman Brad Stuart and forward Wayne Primeau for All-Star centre Joe Thornton. With 273 points in 553 games over nearly eight-and-a-half seasons in San Jose, he left the Sharks ranked sixth in all-time team scoring.

=== Boston Bruins (2005–2010) ===
At the time of the trade, Sturm had recorded 16 points in 23 games with the Sharks. Playing with his new team, he finished the 2005–06 season with career-highs of 29 goals (second on the team to centre Patrice Bergeron), 30 assists and 59 points, (third on the team behind Bergeron and winger Brad Boyes) over 74 games. The Bruins struggled as a team, however, and finished out of the playoffs. In his first full season with the Bruins, Sturm notched 27 goals and 44 points. His 17 assists were his lowest total since the 1999–2000 season. The Bruins once again failed to qualify for the playoffs. In 2007–08, Sturm neared career-highs once again as he tallied 56 points, second in team-scoring behind centre Marc Savard, as well as a team-leading 27 goals. He helped the Bruins return to the post-season as the eighth and last seed in the East, matched against the Montreal Canadiens in the first round. Facing elimination in Game 6, Sturm scored with less than three minutes remaining in regulation. After Canadiens goaltender Carey Price stopped his initial shot, Sturm retrieved his own rebound and skated the puck around Price for the game's winning goal. Though the Bruins forced a Game 7, they lost the deciding contest and were eliminated. Sturm had 2 goals and 4 points during the series.

Sturm was beset with injuries during the 2008–09 season, the first of which was a concussion, suffered on November 19, 2008. After returning to the lineup having missed 12 games, he suffered a knee injury on December 20, 2008. The following month, he opted for surgery to repair his meniscus and anterior cruciate ligament (ACL), ending his season at 19 games, during which time he tallied 7 goals and 13 points. The Bruins advanced to the second round of the playoffs that year, losing in seven games to the Carolina Hurricanes. Recovered from knee surgery, Sturm returned to play in the 2009–10 season. During the 2010 Winter Classic, which the Bruins hosted against the Philadelphia Flyers at Fenway Park on January 1, 2010, Sturm scored the game-winning goal in overtime. The Bruins won by a 2–1 score. Sturm finished the season with 37 points over 76 games. His 22 goals led the Bruins in scoring for the second time in three years. He helped the Bruins qualify for the playoffs, where they were eliminated in the second round once more. During the Eastern Conference Semifinals against the Flyers, Sturm injured his knee 21 seconds into Game 1, sidelining him for the remainder of the playoffs.

With a torn ACL and medial collateral ligament (MCL), he underwent his second knee surgery in three years and missed nearly half of the ensuing 2010–11 season due to rehabilitation.

=== Post-Bruins (2010–2014) ===
While his recovery from knee surgery was nearly complete, Sturm was traded to the Los Angeles Kings on December 11, 2010, in exchange for future considerations. The deal with the Kings had almost been finalized nine days prior, but had initially fallen through. On December 21, Sturm was activated from injured reserve and joined his new team wearing the #10 jersey, as his usual #16 was retired by the Kings for Hockey Hall of Fame centre Marcel Dionne. After scoring 5 goals and 9 points over 17 games with the Kings, Sturm was placed on waivers on February 25, 2011. The following day, he was claimed by the Washington Capitals. Playing 18 games with Washington, he recorded one goal and seven points. In the playoffs, he added a goal and three points over nine games as the Capitals were eliminated in the second round.

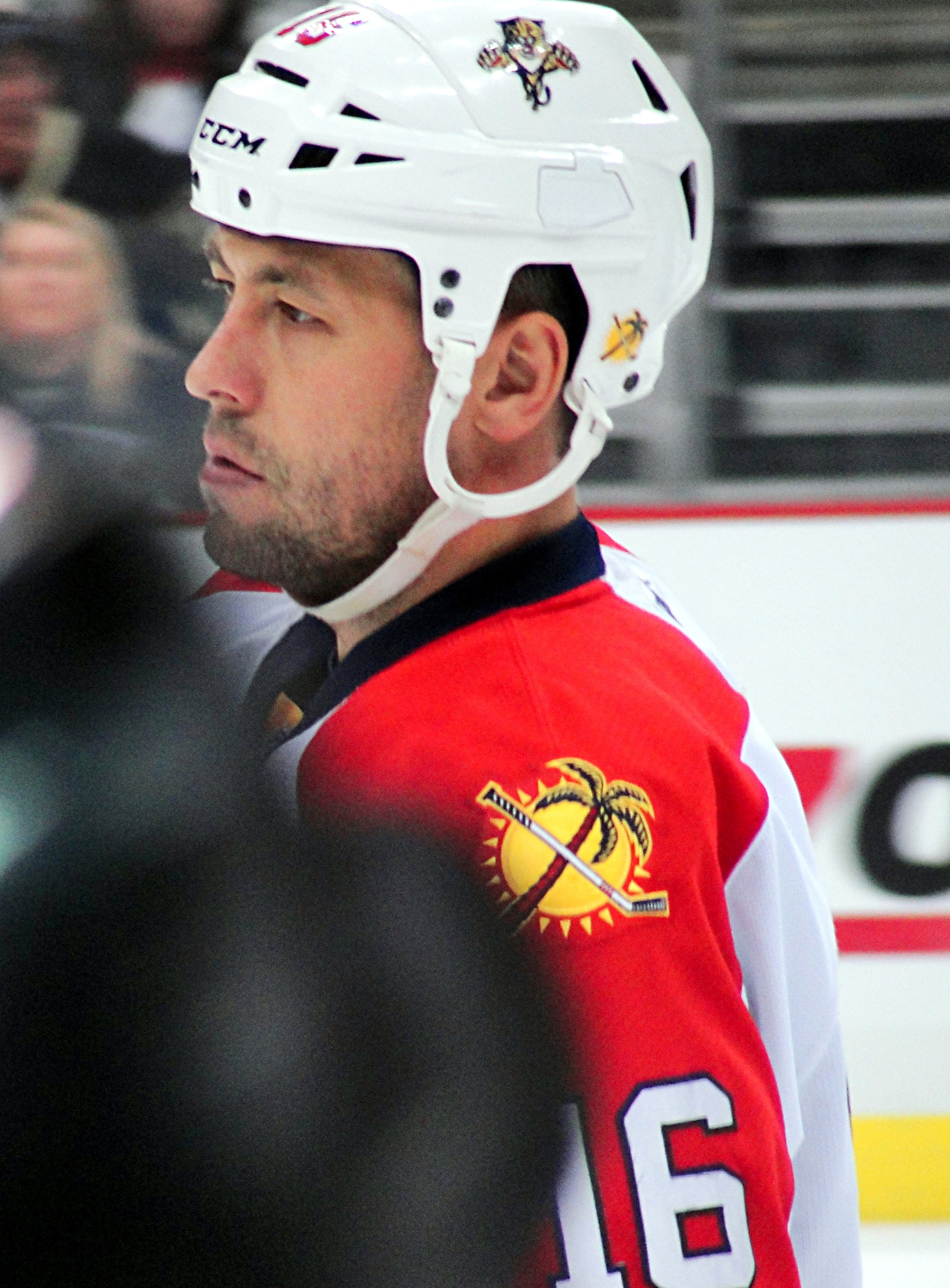
Sturm with the Florida Panthers in 2012

Sturm became an unrestricted free agent in the off-season, and the Vancouver Canucks expressed interest in signing him. He consulted with countryman Christian Ehrhoff, who had played defence with Vancouver for two years before signing with the Buffalo Sabres that summer. Ehrhoff recommended the team and Sturm signed to a one-year, $2.25 million deal on July 1, 2011. The Canucks had been Stanley Cup finalists the previous season and Sturm later explained he believed Vancouver was his "best chance" to win a championship. General manager Mike Gillis acknowledged the risk in signing Sturm, given his two knee surgeries in the past three years. Beginning the season on the second line, Sturm struggled with his new team. Less than a month into the season, on October 22, 2011, he was traded to the Florida Panthers, along with fellow veteran forward Mikael Samuelsson for forwards David Booth and Steven Reinprecht, as well as a 2013 third-round pick. Sturm appeared in 49 games for Florida in 2011–12, including all 7 games of the Panthers' first-round playoff loss to the New Jersey Devils.

Following the NHL lockout Sturm began the season as an unrestricted free agent before eventually signing with Kölner Haie in the Deutsche Eishockey League. The signing was officially announced by the team on February 3, 2013. He announced his retirement from the game of ice hockey on January 27, 2014.

== Coaching career ==
Sturm was named head coach and general manager of the German mens's national team on July 10, 2015. Under his guidance, Germany won the 2015 Deutschland Cup title. Head coaching his first World Championship in 2016, Sturm led Germany to a quarterfinal appearance. In September 2016, Germany won the qualifying tournament for participation in the 2018 Winter Olympics. At the 2017 World Championship, Sturm led the team to another quarterfinal, losing 2–1 to Canada. Sturm was credited with the progress of the German team, and for the willingness of the German NHL players to represent their country internationally. Under his leadership the German team reached the final at the 2018 Winter Olympics, earning the silver medal.

On November 4, 2018, Sturm departed the German national team to become an assistant coach with the Los Angeles Kings, following the early-season firings of assistant coach Don Nachbaur and head coach John Stevens. Four years later, Sturm was named head coach of the Kings' American Hockey League (AHL) affiliate, the Ontario Reign, prior to the 2022–23 season.

On June 5, 2025, Sturm was named head coach of the Boston Bruins. He is the franchise's first European head coach, as well as the seventh in NHL history.

== Personal life ==
Sturm is married to his wife Astrid, they have two children together.

On July 14, 2026, Sturm was recognized with Order of Merit of the Federal Republic of Germany, the highest civilian honor in Germany, for his "long-standing, selfless, and tireless commitment to his fellow citizens as well as his exceptional contributions to German ice hockey."

== Career statistics ==
=== Regular season and playoffs ===
			Regular season					Playoffs
Season	Team	League	GP	G	A	Pts	PIM	GP	G	A	Pts	PIM
1995–96	EV Landshut	DEL	47	12	20	32	50	11	1	3	4	18
1996–97	EV Landshut	DEL	46	16	27	43	40	7	1	4	5	6
1997–98	San Jose Sharks	NHL	74	10	20	30	40	2	0	0	0	0
1998–99	San Jose Sharks	NHL	78	16	22	38	52	6	2	2	4	4
1999–00	San Jose Sharks	NHL	74	12	15	27	22	12	1	3	4	6
2000–01	San Jose Sharks	NHL	81	14	18	32	28	6	0	2	2	0
2001–02	San Jose Sharks	NHL	77	21	20	41	32	12	3	2	5	2
2002–03	San Jose Sharks	NHL	82	28	20	48	16	—	—	—	—	—
2003–04	San Jose Sharks	NHL	64	21	20	41	36	—	—	—	—	—
2004–05	ERC Ingolstadt	DEL	45	22	16	38	56	11	3	4	7	12
2005–06	San Jose Sharks	NHL	23	6	10	16	16	—	—	—	—	—
2005–06	Boston Bruins	NHL	51	23	20	43	32	—	—	—	—	—
2006–07	Boston Bruins	NHL	76	27	17	44	46	—	—	—	—	—
2007–08	Boston Bruins	NHL	80	27	29	56	40	7	2	2	4	6
2008–09	Boston Bruins	NHL	19	7	6	13	8	—	—	—	—	—
2009–10	Boston Bruins	NHL	76	22	15	37	30	7	0	0	0	4
2010–11	Los Angeles Kings	NHL	17	4	5	9	17	—	—	—	—	—
2010–11	Washington Capitals	NHL	18	1	6	7	6	9	1	2	3	4
2011–12	Vancouver Canucks	NHL	6	0	0	0	2	—	—	—	—	—
2011–12	Florida Panthers	NHL	42	3	2	5	23	7	0	0	0	4
2012–13	Kölner Haie	DEL	5	0	0	0	6	12	6	3	9	18
DEL totals			154	51	66	117	172	41	11	14	25	54
NHL totals			938	242	245	487	446	68	9	13	22	30

=== International ===
Year	Team	Event	GP	G	A	Pts	PIM
1994	Germany	EJC	5	0	1	1	4
1995	Germany	WJC	7	0	0	0	6
1995	Germany	EJC	5	2	3	5	2
1996	Germany	WJC	6	4	6	10	51
1996	Germany	EJC	5	5	6	11	8
1997	Germany	OLYQ	3	0	0	0	6
1997	Germany	WC	8	1	1	2	4
1998	Germany	OLY	2	0	0	0	0
2001	Germany	WC	7	4	1	5	26
2002	Germany	OLY	5	0	1	1	0
2004	Germany	WCH	4	2	0	2	0
2006	Germany	WC-I	5	4	3	7	4
2008	Germany	WC	6	2	1	3	6
2010	Germany	OLY	4	0	1	1	0
Junior totals			28	11	16	27	71
Senior totals			44	13	8	21	46

- All statistics taken from NHL.com

== Head coaching record ==
Team	Year	Regular season							Postseason		
Team	Year	G	W	L	OTL	Pts	Finish	W	L	Win%	Result
BOS	2025–26	82	45	27	10	100	4th in Atlantic	2	4	.333	Lost in first round (BUF)
NHL total		82	45	27	10			2	4	.333	1 playoff appearance

== Achievements and honors ==
=== As a player ===
- NHL All-Star – 1999
- DEL All-Star Game - 2005
- (gold) IIHF World Championship Division I - 2006
- World Championship Top 3 Player on Team - 2008

=== As a coach ===
- Deutschland Cup champion – 2015
- (silver) Winter Olympics – 2018

=== Other honors ===
- Order of Merit of the Federal Republic of Germany - Awarded in 2026

== Notes ==
Awards and achievements
Preceded by Andrei Zyuzin	San Jose Sharks first-round draft pick 1996	Succeeded by Patrick Marleau
Sporting positions
Preceded by Joe Sacco (interim)	Head coach of the Boston Bruins; 2025–present	Incumbent
