= Michael O'Sullivan (poet) =

Michael O'Sullivan (born 1959) is an Irish poet.

Educated at University College Cork (UCC), he graduated with an honours master's degree in 1989.

His first book collection was The Physics Of Parting in 1993, with an introduction by John Montague. Many of his books are listed in the National Library of Ireland Catalogue and have been published by Lapwing Publications, Belfast, Northern Ireland. His poems, short stories and reviews have appeared in distinguished anthologies and journals in Ireland, Great Britain and America. A selection of his poems appeared in The Cloverdale Anthology Of Irish Poetry 1992, and in 1993 he won The American Cloverdale Prize for Poetry.

== Anthologies ==
Among the anthologies and journals to feature his work are:

- Oxford Poetry
- Poetry Ireland Review
- Human Rights Have No Borders; Amnesty International

== Bibliography ==
- The Physics Of Parting (Wyndham Hall Press/The Cloverdale Library, Cloverdale Corporation, Bristol, In 46507-9460. Library Of Congress Catalogue No: 93-070615. ISBN 1-55605-226-X.
- The Judge Who Sentenced You To Your Own Destiny (Lapwing Publications, Belfast, 2001. ISBN 1-898472-50-5.
- Lover Of Ashes (Lapwing Publications, Belfast. 2005. ISBN 1-905425-16-3
- Mornings Of The Oresteia (New & Selected Poems 1978-2008) Lapwing Publications, Belfast. ISBN 978-1-905425-80-8.
