= List of Nashville Predators award winners =

Nashville Predators awards

Team trophies
- Award*: Wins
- Stanley Cup: 0
- Clarence S. Campbell Bowl: 1
- Presidents' Trophy: 1

Individual awards
- Award*: Wins
- Bill Masterton Memorial Trophy: 1
- General Manager of the Year Award: 1
- James Norris Memorial Trophy: 1
- King Clancy Memorial Trophy: 1
- Lester Patrick Trophy: 1
- Mark Messier Leadership Award: 2
- NHL Foundation Player Award: 1
- Vezina Trophy: 1

Total
- Awards won: 11

This is a list of Nashville Predators award winners.

== League awards ==
=== Team trophies ===
Team trophies awarded to the Nashville Predators
Award	Description	Times won	Seasons	References
Clarence S. Campbell Bowl	Western Conference playoff championship	1	2016–17	
Presidents' Trophy	Most regular season points	1	2017–18	

=== Individual awards ===
Individual awards won by Nashville Predators players and staff
Award	Description	Winner	Season	References
Bill Masterton Memorial Trophy	Perseverance, sportsmanship and dedication to hockey	Steve Sullivan	2008–09	
James Norris Memorial Trophy	Top defenseman during the regular season	Roman Josi	2019–20	
Jim Gregory General Manager of the Year Award	Top general manager	David Poile	2016–17	
King Clancy Memorial Trophy	Leadership qualities on and off the ice and humanitarian contributions within their community	Pekka Rinne	2020–21	
Mark Messier Leadership Award	Leadership and contributions to society	Shea Weber	2015–16	
Mark Messier Leadership Award	Leadership and contributions to society	Wayne Simmonds	2018–19	
NHL Foundation Player Award	Community service	Mike Fisher	2011–12	
Vezina Trophy	Top goaltender	Pekka Rinne	2017–18	

== All-Stars ==
=== NHL first and second team All-Stars ===
The NHL first and second team All-Stars are the top players at each position as voted on by the Professional Hockey Writers' Association.

Nashville Predators selected to the NHL First and Second Team All-Stars
Player	Position	Selections	Season	Team
Filip Forsberg	Left wing	1	2023–24	2nd
Roman Josi	Defense	3	2019–20	1st
Roman Josi	Defense	3	2021–22	1st
Roman Josi	Defense	3	2023–24	1st
Pekka Rinne	Goaltender	2	2010–11	2nd
Pekka Rinne	Goaltender	2	2017–18	1st
P. K. Subban	Defense	1	2017–18	2nd
Shea Weber	Defense	4	2010–11	1st
Shea Weber	Defense	4	2011–12	1st
Shea Weber	Defense	4	2013–14	2nd
Shea Weber	Defense	4	2014–15	2nd

=== NHL All-Rookie Team ===
The NHL All-Rookie Team consists of the top rookies at each position as voted on by the Professional Hockey Writers' Association.

Nashville Predators selected to the NHL All-Rookie Team
Player	Position	Season
Alexandre Carrier	Defense	2021–22
Filip Forsberg	Forward	2014–15
Juuse Saros	Goaltender	2017–18

=== All-Star Game selections ===
The National Hockey League All-Star Game is a mid-season exhibition game held annually between many of the top players of each season. Sixteen All-Star Games have been held since the Nashville Predators entered the league in 1998, with at least one player chosen to represent the Predators in eleven of the games. The All-Star game has not been held in various years: 1979 and 1987 due to the 1979 Challenge Cup and Rendez-vous '87 series between the NHL and the Soviet national team, respectively, 1995, 2005, and 2013 as a result of labor stoppages, 2006, 2010, 2014 and 2026 because of the Winter Olympic Games, 2021 as a result of the COVID-19 pandemic, and 2025 when it was replaced by the 2025 4 Nations Face-Off. Nashville has hosted one of the games. The 61st was held at Bridgestone Arena.

- † Selected by fan vote

Nashville Predators players and coaches selected to the All-Star Game
Game	Year	Name	Position	References
49th	1999	Sergei Krivokrasov	Right wing	
50th	2000	Kimmo Timonen (Did not play)	Defense	
51st	2001	No Predators selected	—	
52nd	2002	No Predators selected	—	
53rd	2003	No Predators selected	—	
54th	2004	Kimmo Timonen	Defense	
54th	2004	Tomas Vokoun	Goaltender	
55th	2007	Kimmo Timonen	Defense	
55th	2007	Barry Trotz	Assistant coach	
56th	2008	Jason Arnott	Center	
57th	2009	Shea Weber	Defense	
58th	2011	Shea Weber	Defense	
59th	2012	Ryan Suter	Defense	
59th	2012	Shea Weber	Defense	
60th	2015	Filip Forsberg (Replaced Evgeni Malkin)	Center	
60th	2015	Peter Laviolette	Coach	
60th	2015	Pekka Rinne (Did not play)	Goaltender	
60th	2015	Shea Weber	Defense	
61st	2016	Roman Josi	Defense	
61st	2016	James Neal (Replaced Jonathan Toews)	Right wing	
61st	2016	Pekka Rinne	Goaltender	
61st	2016	Shea Weber	Defense	
62nd	2017	P. K. Subban†	Defense	
63rd	2018	Peter Laviolette	Coach	
63rd	2018	Pekka Rinne	Goaltender	
63rd	2018	P. K. Subban†	Defense	
64th	2019	Roman Josi	Defense	
64th	2019	Pekka Rinne	Goaltender	
65th	2020	Roman Josi	Defense	
66th	2022	Roman Josi (Replaced Nathan MacKinnon)	Defense	
66th	2022	Juuse Saros	Goaltender	
67th	2023	Juuse Saros	Goaltender	
68th	2024	Filip Forsberg	Center	

=== All-Star Game replacement events ===
Nashville Predators players and coaches selected to All-Star Game replacement events
Event	Year	Name	Position	References
4 Nations Face-Off	2025	Filip Forsberg (Sweden)	Left wing	
4 Nations Face-Off	2025	Gustav Nyquist (Sweden)	Right wing	
4 Nations Face-Off	2025	Juuse Saros (Finland)	Goaltender	

== Career achievements ==
=== Hockey Hall of Fame ===
The following is a list of Nashville Predators who have been enshrined in the Hockey Hall of Fame.

Nashville Predators inducted into the Hockey Hall of Fame
Individual	Category	Year inducted	Years with Predators in category	References
Peter Forsberg	Player	2014	2007	
Paul Kariya	Player	2017	2005–2007	
Pekka Rinne	Player	2026	2005-2021	

=== Lester Patrick Trophy ===
The Lester Patrick Trophy has been presented by the National Hockey League and USA Hockey since 1966 to honor a recipient's contribution to ice hockey in the United States. This list includes all personnel who have ever been employed by the Nashville Predators in any capacity and have also received the Lester Patrick Trophy.

Members of the Nashville Predators honored with the Lester Patrick Trophy
Individual	Year honored	Years with Predators	References
David Poile	2001	1998–present	

=== United States Hockey Hall of Fame ===
Members of the Nashville Predators inducted into the United States Hockey Hall of Fame
Individual	Year inducted	Years with Predators	References
David Poile	2018	1998–present	

=== Retired numbers ===
The Nashville Predators have retired one of their jersey numbers. Also out of circulation is the number 99 which was retired league-wide for Wayne Gretzky on February 6, 2000. Gretzky did not play for the Predators during his 20-year NHL career and no Predators player had ever worn the number 99 prior to its retirement.

Nashville Predators retired numbers
Number	Player	Position	Years with Predators as a player	Date of retirement ceremony	References
35	Pekka Rinne	Goaltender	2005–2021	February 24, 2022	

== See also ==
- List of National Hockey League awards
