= List of Nashville Predators general managers =

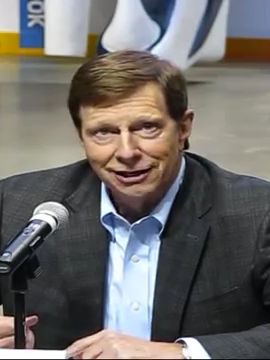
David Poile served as the Predators' general manager from the franchise's inception in 1997 until the conclusion of the 2022–23 season.

The Nashville Predators are an American professional ice hockey team based in Nashville, Tennessee. They play in the Central Division of the Western Conference in the National Hockey League (NHL). The team joined the NHL in 1998 as an expansion team and have played their home games at the Bridgestone Arena since their inaugural season. From the franchise's inception until 2023, David Poile served as the team's sole general manager. On February 26, 2023, the team announced that Poile would retire as general manager, with former head coach Barry Trotz replacing him effective July 1, 2023. On February 2, 2026, Trotz announced his intention to step down as general manager and transition into an advisory role; he was succeeded as general manager by Chris MacFarland on June 2, 2026.

== Key ==
Key of terms and definitions
Term	Definition
No.	Number of general managers^{[a]}
Ref(s)	References
–	Does not apply
†	Elected to the Hockey Hall of Fame in the Builder category

== General managers ==
General managers of the Nashville Predators
No.	Name	Tenure	Accomplishments during this term	Ref(s)
1	David Poile†	July 9, 1997 – June 30, 2023	1 Stanley Cup Finals appearance (2017); Won General Manager of the Year Award (2016–17); Won Presidents' Trophy (2017–18); 1 conference title, 2 division titles, and 14 playoff appearances	
2	Barry Trotz	July 1, 2023 – June 2, 2026	No playoff appearances	
3	Chris MacFarland	June 2, 2026 – present		

== See also ==
- List of NHL general managers

== Notes ==
- ^{a} A running total of the number of general managers of the franchise. Thus any general manager who has two or more separate terms as general manager is only counted once.
