= Chris MacFarland =

American ice hockey executive

- Born: March 28, 1970 (age 56); The Bronx, New York City, U.S.
- Education: Pace University
- Occupations: President of hockey operations and general manager
- Years active: 1999–present
- Employer: Nashville Predators
- Known for: Ice hockey executive (1999–present)
- Awards: 2022 Stanley Cup

Chris MacFarland (born March 28, 1970) is an American ice hockey executive serving as the president of hockey operations and general manager for the Nashville Predators of the National Hockey League (NHL).

== Early life ==
Born in the Bronx, New York, MacFarland played collegiate hockey at Pace University where he received a bachelor's degree in business in 1992 and later graduated from the university's law school in 1998. He began his career on the business side of ice hockey as an intern in the NHL's New York office from 1993 and worked in the NHL Productions office while attending law school.

== Executive career ==
=== Columbus Blue Jackets ===
MacFarland joined Columbus prior to the 1999–2000 campaign and served as the manager of hockey operations from 2001 to 2007 before being promoted to assistant to general manager Scott Howson, in July 2007.

MacFarland remained in the Blue Jackets organization for 16 years, serving in all facets of management and spending his final two seasons within the organization as general manager of the Blue Jackets' minor-league affiliate, the Springfield Falcons.

=== Colorado Avalanche ===
On May 21, 2015, MacFarland was hired by the Colorado Avalanche to serve in the same capacity of assistant to general manager Joe Sakic. Working closely with Sakic, MacFarland played a pivotal part in helping the Avalanche rebuild from finishing last in the league in the 2016–17 season to capturing the Presidents' Trophy in 2020–21 and winning the Stanley Cup in the following 2021–22 season.

On July 11, 2022, MacFarland was promoted to general manager of the Avalanche, with Sakic assuming the role of president of hockey operations.

=== Nashville Predators ===
On June 2, 2026, MacFarland departed the Avalanche to become president of hockey operations and general manager of the Nashville Predators.

== Personal life ==
MacFarland and his wife, Chandra, have three sons, Jake, Gavin, Sawyer, and a daughter, Cara.

Sporting positions
Preceded by Joe Sakic	General manager of the Colorado Avalanche; 2022–2026	Succeeded by Joe Sakic
Preceded by Barry Trotz	General manager of the Nashville Predators; 2026–present	Incumbent
