= Nashville Predators =

National Hockey League team in Nashville, Tennessee

- 2026–27 Nashville Predators season
- Conference: Western
- Division: Central
- Founded: 1998
- History: Nashville Predators; 1998–present
- Home arena: Bridgestone Arena
- City: Nashville, Tennessee
- Team colors: Predators gold, navy blue, white
- Media: FanDuel Sports Network South; The Game (102.5 FM)
- Owner: Bill Haslam
- General manager: Chris MacFarland
- Head coach: Andrew Brunette
- Captain: Roman Josi
- Minor league affiliates: Milwaukee Admirals (AHL); Atlanta Gladiators (ECHL)
- Stanley Cups: 0
- Conference championships: 1 (2016–17)
- Presidents' Trophies: 1 (2017–18)
- Division championships: 2 (2017–18, 2018–19)
- Official website: nhl.com/predators

The Nashville Predators (colloquially referred to as the Preds) are a professional ice hockey team based in Nashville, Tennessee. The Predators compete in the National Hockey League (NHL) as a member of the Central Division in the Western Conference. The team has played its home games at Bridgestone Arena since 1998. The Predators are currently affiliated with two minor league teams: the Milwaukee Admirals of the American Hockey League (AHL), and the Atlanta Gladiators of the ECHL.

The club was founded in 1997, when the NHL granted an expansion franchise to Craig Leipold, with the team beginning play in the 1998–99 season. After five seasons, the Predators qualified for their first Stanley Cup playoffs during the 2003–04 season. In 2008, ownership of the team was transferred from Leipold to a locally based ownership group. The Predators advanced to their first Stanley Cup Final in 2017, but were defeated by the Pittsburgh Penguins in six games. In the following season, the Predators won their first Presidents' Trophy and Central Division title. As of 2026, the Predators, along with Nashville SC, are one of two professional sports teams in the state of Tennessee to have not relocated from another location as the Titans and the Grizzlies moved to Tennessee from Houston and Vancouver respectively.

== History ==
=== Bringing the NHL to Nashville ===
In late 1995, rumors began to circulate that the New Jersey Devils would relocate to the planned Nashville Arena after they won their first-ever Stanley Cup championship. Nashville offered a $20 million relocation bonus to any team that would relocate, and the Devils attempted to terminate their lease with the NJSEA before ultimately restructuring it to remain in New Jersey. After the failed attempt to land the Devils, NHL commissioner Gary Bettman stated Nashville would probably be considered in upcoming expansion.

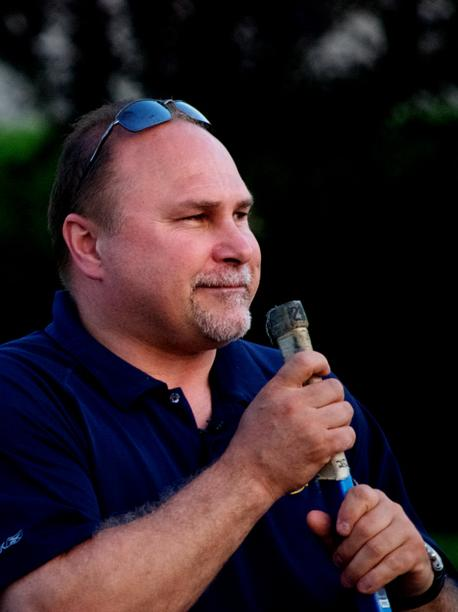
In August 1997, Barry Trotz was named as the first head coach of the Nashville Predators.

In January 1997, a group led by Wisconsin businessman Craig Leipold made a formal presentation before the NHL requesting an expansion franchise. When Bettman and league officials visited Nashville to tour the arena, thousands gathered on the arena plaza to greet them. In June, the league granted conditional franchises to Nashville, Columbus, Ohio; Atlanta, and Minneapolis–Saint Paul.

The Nashville team would begin play in 1998 if they met the NHL requirement of selling 12,000 season tickets before March 31, 1998. Of the four cities, Nashville was the only one with a completed arena and therefore began play first. On July 9, 1997, Leipold named former Washington Capitals general manager David Poile as the franchise's first general manager. Portland Pirates' head coach Barry Trotz was named the franchise's first head coach on August 6.

On September 25, 1997, Leipold and team president Jack Diller held a press conference where they unveiled the franchise's new logo, a saber-toothed cat (Smilodon fatalis). The logo was a reference to a partial Smilodon skeleton found beneath downtown Nashville in 1971 during construction of the First American National Bank building, now the UBS Tower. Once the logo was unveiled, the franchise held a vote among fans to choose a name. Three candidates were culled from 75: "Ice Tigers," "Fury" and "Attack." Leipold added his own submission to the vote, "Predators". On November 13, Leipold revealed at a press conference that his submission had won out and the new franchise would be known as the "Nashville Predators." When awarded a franchise, the city of Nashville paid 31.50% of the $80 million fee to join the league. The city made an agreement that protects them against annual arena operating losses over approximately $3.8 million.

=== Early years (1998–2005) ===
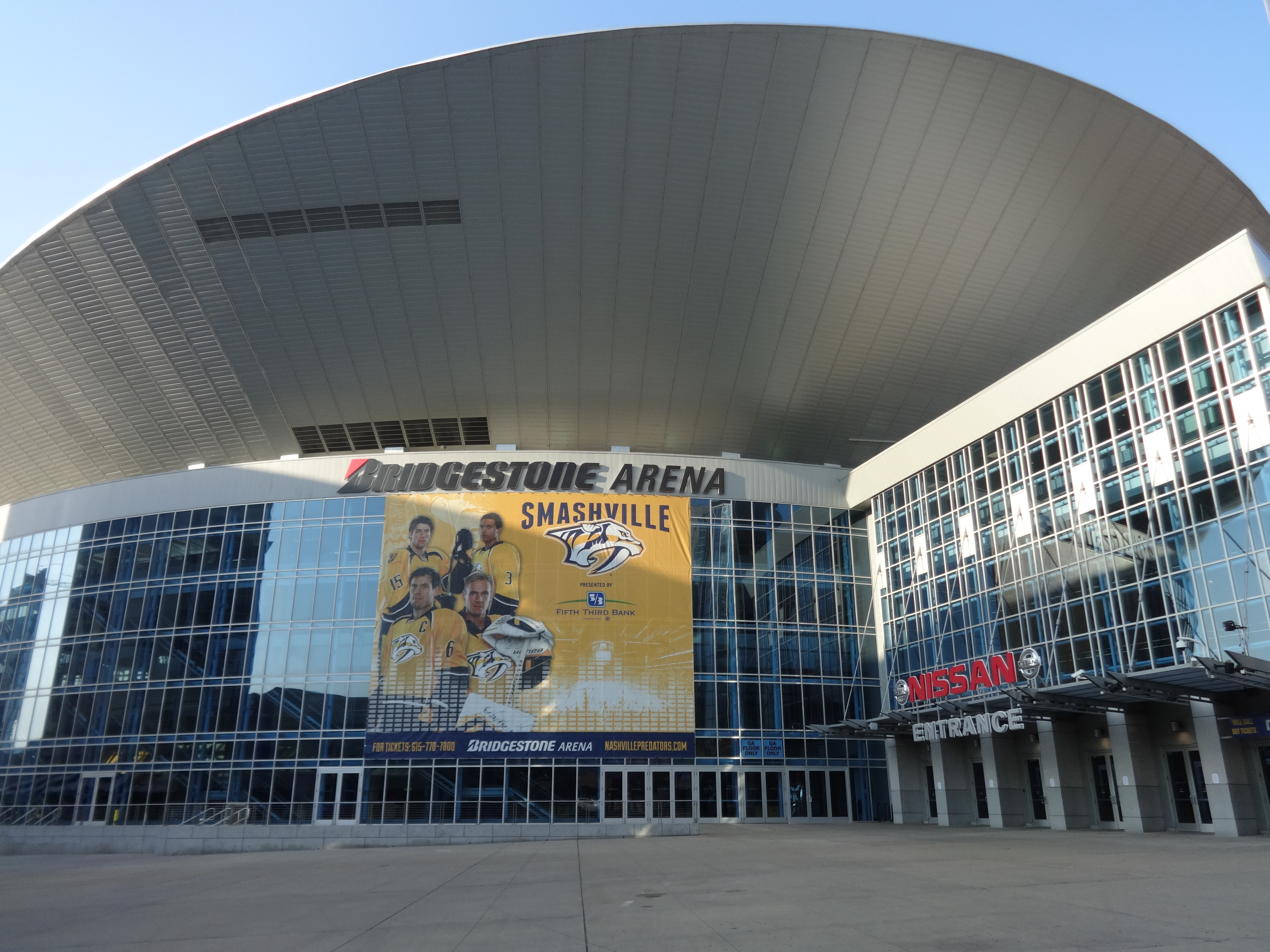
The Predators have played their home games at Bridgestone Arena since 1998.

At the 1998 NHL expansion draft, the Predators were limited on choices due to the protected players many of the teams held. Of the players they selected, future U.S. Hockey Hall of Fame goaltender Mike Richter was one of them. They also acquired Tomáš Vokoun from the Montreal Canadiens. However, Richter would become an unrestricted free agent and re-signed with the Rangers. The Predators began play during the 1998–99 season, taking to the ice for the first time on October 10, 1998, where they lost 1–0 at home to the Florida Panthers. Three nights later, on October 13, they defeated the Carolina Hurricanes 3–2 for their first win. The Predators finished second-to-last in the Western Conference with a 28–47–7 record. In the 1999–2000 season, the Predators finished with a similar record to the previous season, and finished last in the Western Conference.

To begin the 2000–01 season, the Predators played two games at the Saitama Super Arena in Tokyo against the Pittsburgh Penguins. Each team won a game in front of the largest crowds ever to see a hockey game in Japan (13,849 for the first game and 13,426 for the second game). This included around 100 fans who made the trip from Tennessee. During the 2001–02 season, the Predators recorded their 100th victory on December 6, 2001.

In June 2003, the Predators hosted the NHL entry draft. Future Predators captain Shea Weber was selected by the team with the 49th overall pick. They also selected Ryan Suter at seventh overall. In the 2003–04 season, the Predators finished eighth in the Western Conference, qualifying for their first postseason berth. The Predators were eliminated by the Detroit Red Wings in six games in the first round of the 2004 Stanley Cup playoffs. The following 2004–05 season was wiped out by a labor dispute between NHL owners and players.

=== After the lockout (2005–2014) ===
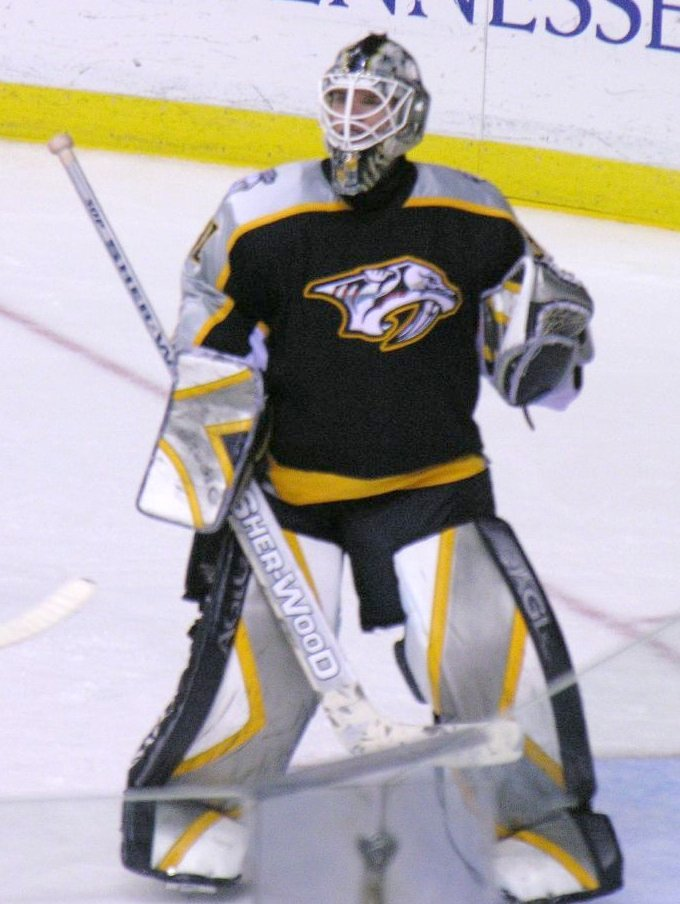
Chris Mason became the ninth goaltender to score a goal in the NHL during the 2005–06 season.

Prior to the 2005–06 season, the Predators signed free agent Paul Kariya. During the season, the Predators became only the fourth NHL franchise to start the season 8–0; the last time a team did so was the Toronto Maple Leafs, who set the mark with a 10–0 start in the 1993–94 season. By the end of the season, the Predators had accumulated 106 points and clinched home-ice advantage in the first round of the playoffs for the first time in team history. They finished the season with an NHL-best 32–8–1 record at home. However, the Predators would be eliminated by the San Jose Sharks in five games in the first round of the 2006 playoffs.

During the offseason, the Predators acquired veteran center Jason Arnott from free agency on July 2, 2006. Late in the 2006–07 season, the Predators traded Scottie Upshall and Ryan Parent, plus their first and third-round pick in the 2007 NHL entry draft, to the Philadelphia Flyers for five-time NHL All-Star Peter Forsberg. The Predators finished the third best record in the league with 110 points. They were defeated by the Sharks in the first round of the 2007 playoffs for the second year in a row, losing the series 4–1.

==== New ownership group ====
Following the 2006–07 season, owner Craig Leipold announced his intention to sell the team to Canadian billionaire Jim Balsillie. On June 23, 2007, information leaked by several sources indicated that Leipold no longer wanted to sell the Predators to Balsillie. Subsequently, a campaign to land the team in Kansas City, Missouri, received a boost in late June 2007. In July 2007, Balsillie accused NHL commissioner Gary Bettman of persuading Leipold not to sell the team to him. Balsillie had intentions of bringing the Predators to Canada. On July 19, 2007, a group of local business owners known as Our Team Nashville held a rally at the Sommet Center to encourage fans to buy season tickets in order to help the Predators meet the attendance figures needed to keep the team in Nashville. They drew approximately 7,500 fans and sold the equivalent of 726 full-season tickets during the rally. The rally was heavily supported by George Plaster, then a sportscaster on WGFX 104.5 "The Zone" sports radio in Nashville. On August 1, 2007, the group released a letter of intent from Craig Leipold. After negotiations with the City of Nashville, the local group headed by David Freeman reached an agreement with Mayor of Nashville Karl Dean, and the NHL Board of Governors approved the sale on November 29, 2007.

In June 2008, Del Biaggio ran into legal trouble over a multitude of unpaid loans, culminating in his filing for Chapter 11 bankruptcy. Furthermore, it was alleged that Del Biaggio acquired the loans he used to buy his stake in the team through fraudulent means, prompting an FBI investigation and criminal charges. The charges culminated in a 97-month prison sentence for Del Biaggio. Under United States bankruptcy law, a trustee was appointed to sell Del Biaggio's assets, including his stake in the Predators, to pay off his creditors. In November 2011, it was announced that Calgary businessman W. Brett Wilson had purchased a 5% interest in the Nashville Predators. In August, the team was sold to a local group of businessmen for $193 million (US) dollars. At the 2007 NHL entry draft, the Predators traded Tomáš Vokoun to the Florida Panthers for three draft picks. During the season, they relied their goaltending on Chris Mason and Dan Ellis. Ellis, who was signed from the Dallas Stars before the season began, had a 233:39 long shutout streak (fifth longest in league history) nearing the end of the season that helped Nashville attain the eighth playoff spot with 91 points. In the playoffs, the Predators met the Presidents' Trophy-winning Red Wings in the first round and were defeated in six games.

At the 2008 NHL entry draft, the Predators traded two picks to select Roman Josi at 38th overall. The team also traded goaltender Mason to the St. Louis Blues. Alexander Radulov, after scoring 26 goals in the prior season, made his intention to play in Russia the following season. However, his contract with the Predators was still in effect, despite signing with Salavat Yulaev Ufa of the KHL. The NHL, IIHF, and KHL all agreed to respect global contracts on July 10, 2008. As a result, he was suspended from the team without pay on September 2, 2008. During the season, goaltender Pekka Rinne became the starter for the Predators. The team missed the playoffs.

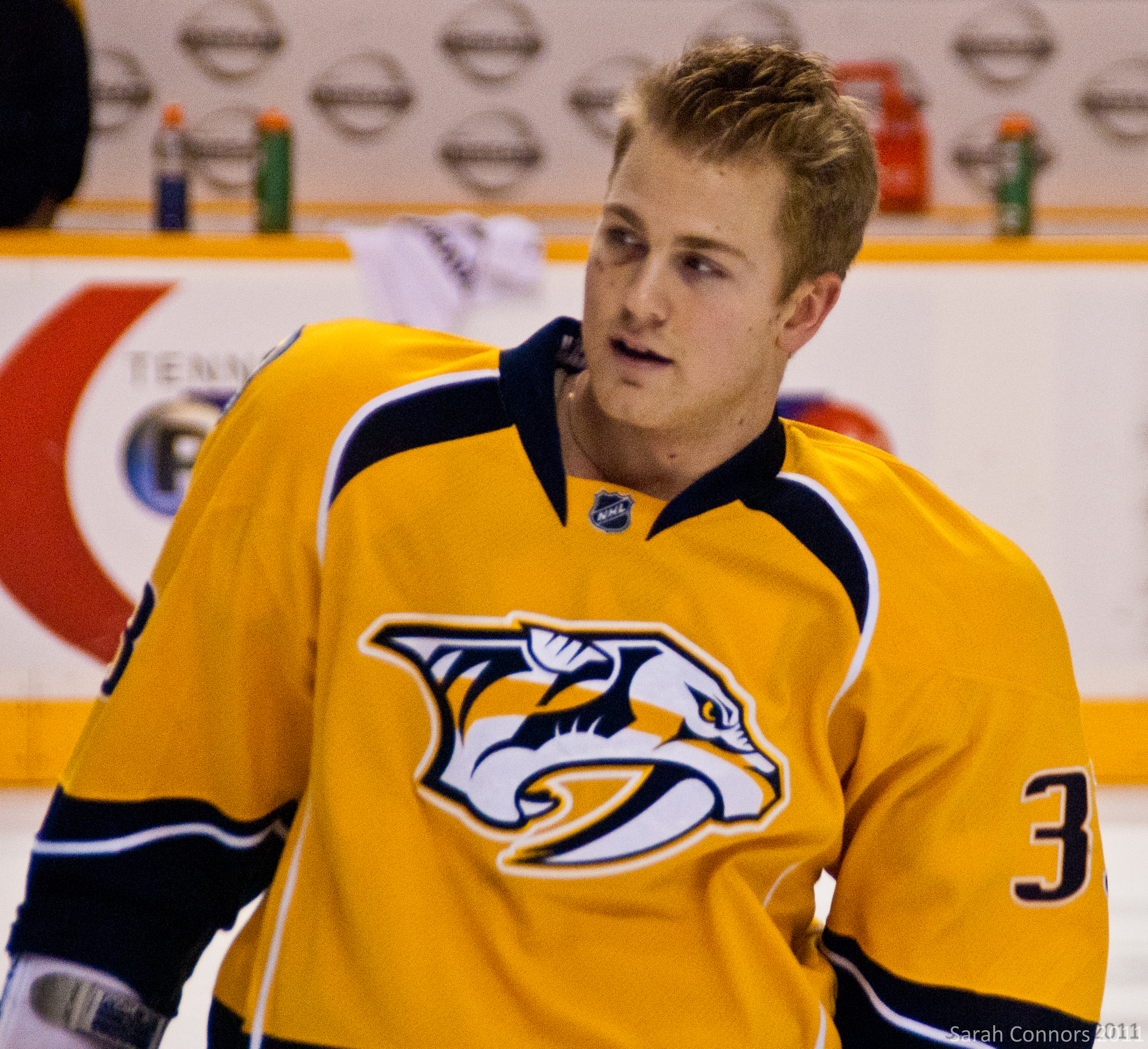
The 2009–10 season saw the debut of Colin Wilson with the Predators.

The 2009–10 season saw the much-anticipated debut of 2008 seventh-overall pick Colin Wilson. However, due to a groin injury suffered in training camp, Wilson spent the first week-and-a-half of the season on the sidelines, and was sent to the Milwaukee Admirals of the American Hockey League (AHL) in November. He returned to the club in February and scored 11 points in his next 15 games and finished the season with 15 points in 35 games. 2010 also saw a breakout year for the last pick in the 2005 draft, Patric Hornqvist, as the 23-year-old Swede scored 30 goals in the 2009–10 season. On March 1, 2010, during the 2009–10 season, the Predators front office saw Freeman step down as chairman of the Nashville Predators in favor of Thomas Cigarran. On September 2, Cigarran announced that the local ownership group had completed the purchase of the Del Biaggio stake.The Predators qualified for the 2010 playoffs, facing the Chicago Blackhawks in the first round, and losing to them in six games.

On July 9, 2010, the Predators announced defenseman Shea Weber would become the club's fifth captain. In the following season's playoffs, the Predators advanced to the second round of the playoffs for the first time in franchise history. They defeated the Anaheim Ducks in the first round. In the second round, they lost to the Presidents' Trophy-winning Vancouver Canucks in six games.

In the beginning of the 2011–12 season, the Predators signed goaltender Rinne to a seven-year, $49 million deal. On February 27, 2012, the Predators acquired Andrei Kostitsyn and Paul Gaustad from the Montreal Canadiens and the Buffalo Sabres, respectively. The season saw the return of Russian forward Alexander Radulov to the Predators after a four-year hiatus to play in the Kontinental Hockey League (KHL). In the 2012 playoffs, the team defeated the Red Wings. However, the Predators were ousted in the Western Conference semifinals, this time to the Phoenix Coyotes. During their second round series, Kostitsyn and Radulov were both spotted in a Scottsdale bar following game two and were subsequently suspended from game three.

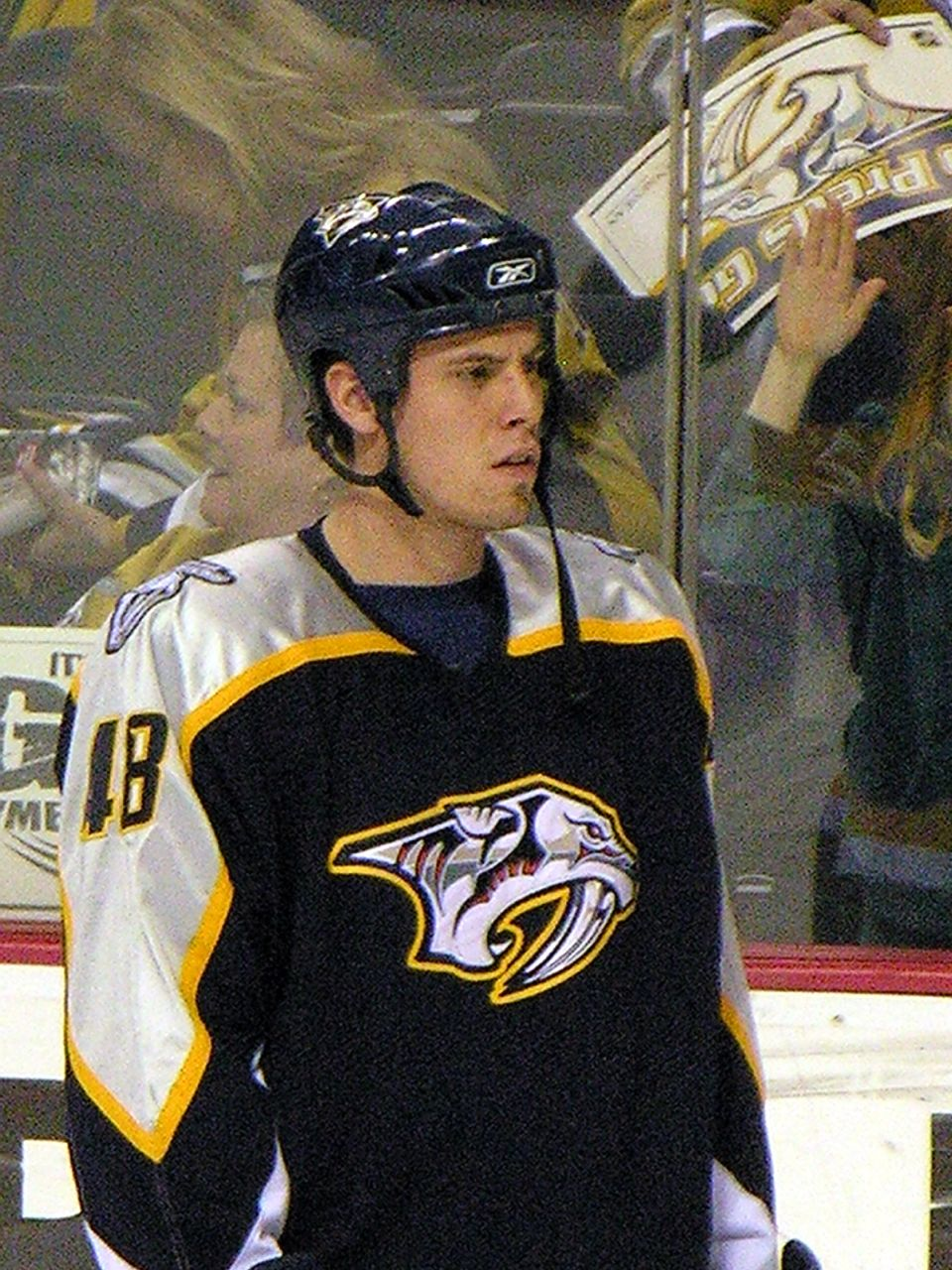
The Predators signed Shea Weber to a 14-year contract in 2012, after the Philadelphia Flyers made a front-loaded offer sheet for Weber.

In the 2012–13 offseason, the team reacquired goaltender Chris Mason. The team also lost Ryan Suter in free agency as he signed with the Minnesota Wild. The Predators signed Weber through a front-loaded $110 million, 14-year offer sheet, $68 million of it as a signing bonus, from the Philadelphia Flyers on July 19. The offer sheet was the richest in NHL history in terms of total money, money per season, and length, surpassing the previous offer sheet record set by Thomas Vanek.

The following season saw the departure of center David Legwand, the first player drafted by the Predators, the club's all-time leading scorer, and co-leading scorer for the season at the time. Agreeing to waive his "no trade clause", he was traded to the Detroit Red Wings, in exchange for prospect forward Calle Järnkrok, forward Patrick Eaves and a third-round pick in the 2014 NHL entry draft. After missing the playoffs for the second consecutive season, the Predators opted not to renew the contract of head coach Barry Trotz, although he was offered an unnamed position within the organization. On May 6, 2014, the Predators announced Peter Laviolette as their new head coach.

=== Peter Laviolette era (2014–2020) ===
The offseason involved trading Patric Hörnqvist and Nick Spaling for James Neal. They also drafted Kevin Fiala and Viktor Arvidsson in the 2014 NHL entry draft. In Peter Laviolette's first season as the Predators' head coach, the Predators finished second in the Central Division. Despite having home advantage in the first round of the 2015 playoffs, they lost in six games to the Chicago Blackhawks. During the 2015–16 season, the Predators named Sean Henry CEO. They also traded defenseman Seth Jones to the Columbus Blue Jackets for forward Ryan Johansen. In the 2016 playoffs, they beat the Anaheim Ducks in seven games, but were eliminated in seven games by the San Jose Sharks in the second round.

On June 23, 2016, Freeman filed a $250 million lawsuit against the Nashville Predators and Cigarran. His claim was that his ownership stake has been improperly diluted by Cigarran failing to notify him of capital calls, and that he had not received loan guaranty fees that the ownership group had agreed to pay him. The lawsuit stated that Freeman initially owned a 48% share, while the holding company for the Nashville Predators stated that Freeman controlled less than 1% of ownership in the team at the time of the suit. This dilution was exacerbated by the existence of two classes of investments in the Predators: the common units owned by Freeman were subject to capital calls; the Series A units originally owned by Del Biaggio and his minority partner were not subject to capital calls.

The dispute was sent to court-ordered arbitration on July 29, 2016, under the supervision of NHL commissioner Gary Bettman. As of January 25, 2018, arbitration was continuing in the unresolved dispute. The outcome remained undisclosed as the arbitration was private.

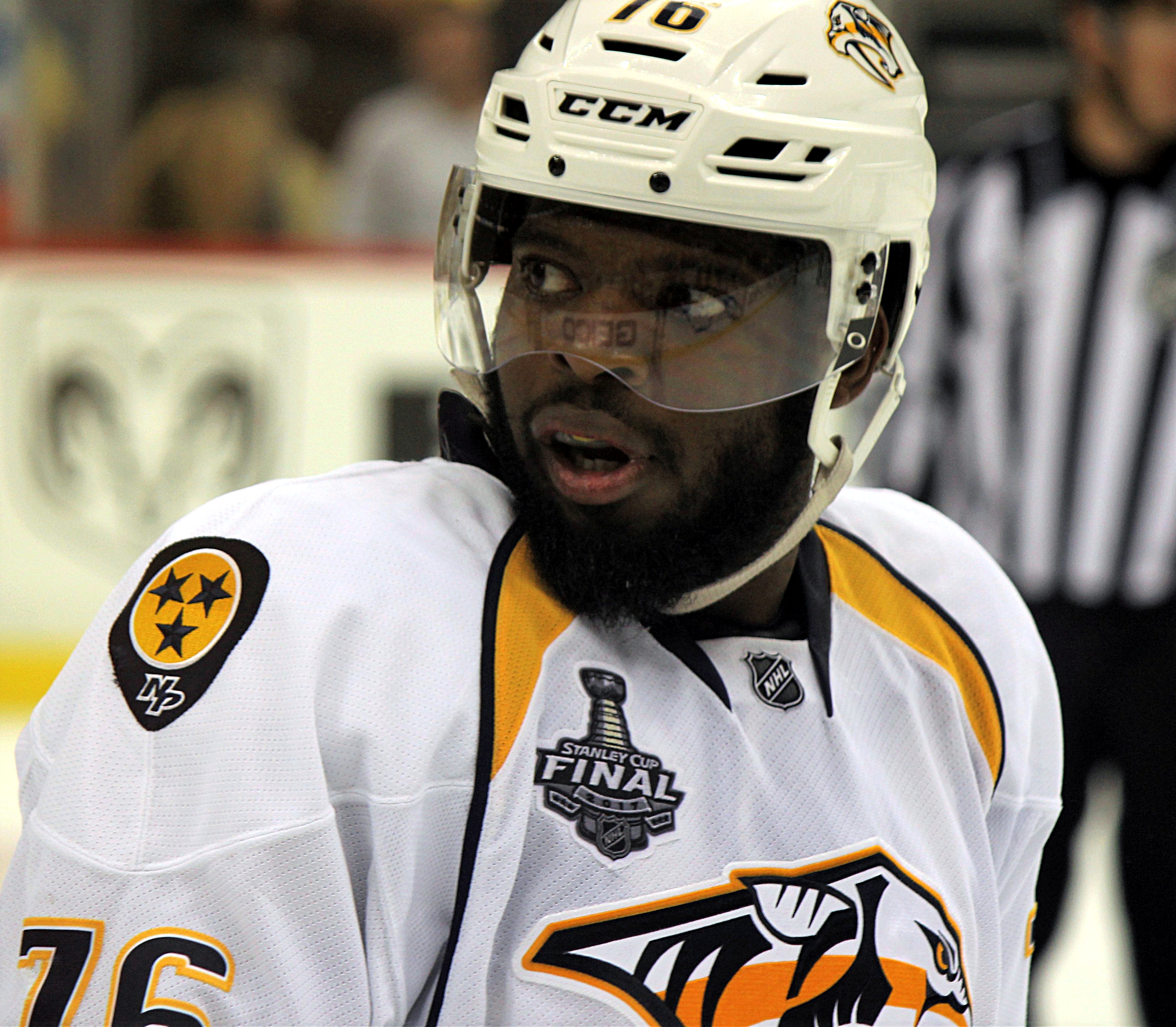
P. K. Subban during the 2017 Stanley Cup Final. The Predators traded Shea Weber to the Montreal Canadiens for Subban in 2016.

In the 2016–17 offseason, the Predators traded captain Shea Weber to the Montreal Canadiens in exchange for defenseman P. K. Subban. The trade surprised many hockey fans because the details to this trade were kept strictly confidential until the deal was already made. After his retirement, GM David Poile regretted the trade. On September 7, 2016, the Predators announced Mike Fisher would replace Weber as the sixth captain of the club.

In the 2016–17 season, the Predators finished fourth in the Central Division with 94 points, which earned them the second wild card spot in the Western Conference. In the playoffs, the Predators swept the Blackhawks in four games. This was the first time an eighth seed swept a playoff series against the top seed in the conference in NHL history as well as the first time that there had been a sweep by an eighth seed against a top seed in a best-of-seven playoff series in the history of North American major league professional sports. In the second round, the Predators defeated the St. Louis Blues in six games. On May 16, the Predators became the first team in 20 years (since the Detroit Red Wings in 1997) to achieve 10 straight wins at home in the postseason. After defeating the Anaheim Ducks in six games, they advanced to the club's first Stanley Cup Final. In the 2017 Stanley Cup Final, the Predators went down 2–0 against the Pittsburgh Penguins before tying the series, winning games three and four at home. Returning to Pittsburgh, the Predators lost 6–0 before being eliminated at home 2–0 in game six.

Fisher announced his retirement on August 3, 2017; defenseman Roman Josi replaced him as captain. He then opted out of retirement to finish the 2017–18 season. The Predators were also involved in a three-way trade with the Colorado Avalanche and Ottawa Senators, in which Nashville acquired Kyle Turris for Samuel Girard, Vladislav Kamenev, and a draft pick. On April 5, 2018, the Predators clinched their first division title in team history while also claiming their first Presidents' Trophy. They defeated the Colorado Avalanche in the first round of the playoffs in six games, and then lost to the Winnipeg Jets in seven games in the second round. Pekka Rinne won the Vezina Trophy as the league's best goaltender.

During the 2018–19 season, the Predators traded out Kevin Fiala for Mikael Granlund and also acquired Wayne Simmonds from the Philadelphia Flyers for Ryan Hartman. The Predators clinched their second consecutive division title, but lost to the Dallas Stars in the first round of the 2019 playoffs. The team had the worst power play percentage in the league that season.

In the 2019–20 offseason, the Predators traded out P. K. Subban to the New Jersey Devils for Steven Santini a prospect and two draft picks. They also picked up Matt Duchene in free agency. The Predators played in their first outdoor game at the 2020 Winter Classic, facing the Dallas Stars at the Cotton Bowl. The Predators fired head coach Laviolette on January 6, 2020, with the team sitting at sixth place in the division at the time and a record of 19–15–7.

=== Continued playoff inconsistency and retool (2020–present) ===
On January 7, 2020, John Hynes was hired as the third head coach in the Predators' franchise history. In Hynes' first game as coach, Pekka Rinne became the second Predators goaltender to score a goal in a 5–2 win over the Chicago Blackhawks. The Predators advanced to the 2020 expanded playoffs, but were defeated by the Arizona Coyotes in the qualifying round. The Predators returned to the playoffs in 2021, but were defeated by the Carolina Hurricanes in the first round. Following the playoffs, Rinne announced his retirement. He finished his career playing only with the Predators and the team's leader in wins and games played.

The Predators hosted the Tampa Bay Lightning at Nissan Stadium in their second outdoor game, the 2022 Stadium Series, on February 26, 2022, losing 3–2. They clinched the 2022 playoffs, but were swept by the eventual Stanley Cup champion Colorado Avalanche in the first round.

On June 17, 2022, former Governor of Tennessee Bill Haslam began purchasing shares in the club to become the majority owner.

In February 2023, David Poile announced that he would retire as general manager of the team at the end of the 2022–23 season, and that former head coach Barry Trotz would succeed him, effective June 30, 2023. The team became sellers at the trade deadline shipping out Tanner Jeannot, Mikael Granlund, and Mattias Ekholm for multiple draft picks. The team missed the playoffs for the first time in eight seasons.

On May 31, 2023, the team hired former player Andrew Brunette as the fourth head coach in franchise history. In the 2023–24 season, the Predators finished as the first wildcard, but lost to the Vancouver Canucks in six games in the first round of the 2024 playoffs. In the 2024 offseason, the team made a splash in free agency signing Jonathan Marchessault, Steven Stamkos, and Brady Skjei. However, the team finished 30th in the NHL with the second fewest goals for.

On February 2, 2026, Trotz announced he would retire at the end of the season. On June 2, 2026, Colorado Avalanche general manager Chris MacFarland was named Trotz's successor, joining Nashville as president of hockey operations and general manager. Three days later, Rob Blake was named executive vice president of hockey operations.

== Team information ==
=== Fan traditions ===
Fans of the Nashville Predators have modified the octopus-throwing tradition of Detroit Red Wings fans to show their support: on occasion, a fan will throw a catfish onto the ice. The Tennessean newspaper of Nashville cites the first instance of this as being on October 30, 2003. On May 16, 2017, during game three of the conference finals at Bridgestone Arena, country music singer, songwriter, and record producer Keith Urban, who had performed the national anthem prior to the game, was seen on the Jumbotron hoisting a massive catfish that Tennessee Titans left tackle, Taylor Lewan had with him at the game. Lewan, along with fellow Titans offensive linemen Jack Conklin, Quinton Spain, Ben Jones, and Josh Kline, and Titans quarterback Marcus Mariota, served as the hype men prior to the game, another Predators playoff tradition prior to home games, which included them waving gold Predators towels, Mariota encouraging the crowd to get louder, Lewan hoisting the catfish, and the offensive linemen chugging beer.

Section 303 is where a section of fans at the Bridgestone Arena sit, stand, and cheer, colloquially known as The Cellblock. The group refers to themselves as "the loudest section of the loudest arena in the NHL." The fan-based organization has been recognized by the Predators' front office. A large banner was produced by the front office for posting on the wall behind the section.

Predators fans use their Fang Fingers during each power play of the game. There are foam saber-fang gloves that can be purchased, but most fans simply curl their index and middle fingers on each hand into fang shapes and brandish them in an up-and-down motion. Fang Fingers are done to the horror sounds from the Alfred Hitchcock movie, Psycho.

=== Jersey and logo ===
Nashville's third jersey logo (2001–2007); a more detailed, three-quarters front view of the team's saber-toothed cat logo and used as their 2023 reverse retro jersey logo (2023–present)

The original Predators uniforms were worn from 1998 to 2007 and both featured a silver yoke on the shoulder. Navy and white were the base uniform colors while gold was used only as an accent color. The white uniforms featured the primary Predators logo outside a navy triangle while the navy uniforms use the same logo minus the triangle. From 1998 to 2004 the secondary logo featuring the Gaylord Entertainment Center (now Bridgestone Arena) tower adorned the shoulders.

From 2001 to 2007 the Predators wore mustard gold third jerseys featuring the front-facing saber-toothed cat logo. These jerseys are known by the nickname "Mustard Cats." The logo then replaced the tower alternate logo on the shoulders of their primary uniforms in 2005.

Switching to Reebok's Edge template in 2007, the Predators made minor tweaks to their uniforms. Most notably, the white uniforms no longer featured a contrasting nameplate color, while the city name was added above the Predators logo.

From 2009 to 2011, the Predators wore navy third jerseys but with black replacing gold as trim color. A roundel logo featuring the fossilized cat adorned the shoulders while a checkerboard pattern of black and navy squares adorned the sleeves, tail stripes and socks.

For the 2011–12 season, the Nashville Predators changed their jersey design and color scheme. The home jerseys are a bright gold with navy and white highlights, while the away jerseys are white with gold and navy highlights. Furthermore, the Predators changed their logo, making it purely white, gold and navy. The jerseys have a guitar pick on the shoulder with the Tennessee state tri-star inside it, lines reminiscent of guitar strings on the numbers, and piano keys along the neckline inside the jersey as a nod to Nashville's internationally known music heritage. From the 2016–17 season gold helmets became a permanent part of the home uniform, after they first used them on Saturday home games the prior season.

In the 2017–18 season the Predators changed their uniform style to fit with the new Adidas template. While the gold home uniforms received minimal alterations, the away white uniforms featured more gold accents in the sleeves, shoulders and tail while navy was relegated to trim color.

The Predators unveiled a special edition uniform for the 2020 Winter Classic, featuring a design inspired from the uniforms of the defunct EHL team Nashville Dixie Flyers. Heavy gold stripes with navy trim adorn the chest and sleeves while a script rendition of the team name was inserted to the gold chest stripe. A navy felt-rendered saber-toothed cat logo was also added on the left shoulder.

In the 2020–21 season, the Predators released a special "Reverse Retro" alternate uniform, using the design they wore from 1998 to 2007. However, gold was used as the base color while navy was relegated to trim color.

For the 2022 Stadium Series, the Predators released a navy uniform with a thick gold stripe in front. The "Smashville" moniker in large navy letters along with the navy "guitar pick" alternate logo was emblazoned inside the gold stripe. Numbers were enlarged for visibility purposes.

A second "Reverse Retro" uniform was released in the 2022–23 season, using the 2001 to 2007 alternate uniform but with the current athletic gold in place of mustard gold.

=== Mascot ===
The mascot of the team is an anthropomorphic saber-toothed tiger named Gnash.

=== Broadcasters ===
Beginning in the 2026–27 season, local television rights of Predators games will be held by Scripps Sports, primarily via forthcoming independent station WNPX-TV and its sister station, CBS affiliate WTVF. Prior to 2026, Predators games aired on FanDuel Sports Network South (formerly Bally Sports South), with its territory covering Tennessee, Georgia, most of Kentucky, northern Mississippi and northern Alabama. Radio coverage is carried by the Nashville Predators Radio Network, whose flagship station is WPRT-FM.

== Season-by-season record ==
This is a partial list of the last five seasons completed by the Predators. For the full season-by-season history, see List of Nashville Predators seasons.

GP = Games played, W = Wins, L = Losses, T = Ties, OTL = Overtime Losses, Pts = Points, GF = Goals for, GA = Goals against

Season	GP	W	L	OTL	Pts	GF	GA	Finish	Playoffs
2021–22	82	45	30	7	97	266	252	5th, Central	Lost in first round, 0–4 (Avalanche)
2022–23	82	42	32	8	92	229	238	5th, Central	Did not qualify
2023–24	82	47	30	5	99	269	248	4th, Central	Lost in first round, 2–4 (Canucks)
2024–25	82	30	44	8	68	214	274	7th, Central	Did not qualify
2025–26	82	38	34	10	86	247	269	6th, Central	Did not qualify

== Players and personnel ==
=== Current roster ===
Updated November 1, 2026

No.	Nat	Player	Pos	S/G	Age	Acquired	Birthplace
29	(Finland)	Justus Annunen	G	L	26	2024	Kempele, Finland
22	(Canada)	Mavrik Bourque	RW	R	24	2026	Plessisville, Quebec
79	(United States)	Ross Colton	C	L	30	2026	Robbinsville, New Jersey
18	(United States)	Jack Drury (A)	C	L	26	2026	New York, New York
84	(Sweden)	Adam Edström	C	L	26	2026	Karlstad, Sweden
9	(Sweden)	Filip Forsberg (A)	LW	R	32	2013	Östervåla, Sweden
41	(Canada)	Nicolas Hague	D	L	27	2025	Kitchener, Ontario
21	(Sweden)	Nils Höglander	LW	L	25	2026	Bockträsk, Sweden
52	(Canada)	Daemon Hunt	D	L	24	2026	Brandon, Manitoba
59	(Switzerland)	Roman Josi (C)	D	L	36	2008	Bern, Switzerland
14	(Canada)	Alexander Kerfoot	C	L	32	2026	Vancouver, British Columbia
46	(Russia)	Ilya Lyubushkin	D	R	32	2026	Moscow, Russia
81	(Canada)	Jonathan Marchessault	C	R	35	2024	Cap-Rouge, Quebec
90	(Canada)	Ryan O'Reilly (A)	C	L	35	2023	Clinton, Ontario
48	(United States)	Nick Perbix	D	R	28	2025	Elk River, Minnesota
51	(Belarus)	Vitali Pinchuk	C	L	24	2026	Zhlobin, Belarus
74	(Finland)	Juuse Saros	G	L	31	2013	Forssa, Finland
49	(Canada)	Reid Schaefer	LW	L	23	2023	Edmonton, Alberta
76	(United States)	Brady Skjei	D	L	32	2024	Lakeville, Minnesota
91	(Canada)	Steven Stamkos (A)	C	R	36	2024	Markham, Ontario
3	(United States)	Jayden Struble	D	L	25	2026	Cumberland, Rhode Island
85	(Canada)	William Trudeau	D	L	24	2026	Varennes, Quebec
2	(Sweden)	Adam Wilsby	D	L	26	2020	Stockholm, Sweden
15	(Canada)	Shane Wright	C	R	22	2026	Burlington, Ontario

=== Team captains ===
- Tom Fitzgerald, 1998–2002
- Greg Johnson, 2002–2006
- Kimmo Timonen, 2006–2007
- Jason Arnott, 2007–2010
- Shea Weber, 2010–2016
- Mike Fisher, 2016–2017
- Roman Josi, 2017–present

=== Retired numbers ===
Nashville Predators retired numbers
No.	Player	Position	Career	No. retirement
35	Pekka Rinne	G	2005–2021	February 24, 2022

- The NHL retired Wayne Gretzky's No. 99 for all its member teams at the 2000 NHL All-Star Game.

=== Hall of Famers ===
Players

- Peter Forsberg
- Paul Kariya
- Pekka Rinne
- Shea Weber

Builders

- David Poile

== Awards and trophies ==
=== League awards ===
Clarence S. Campbell Bowl

- 2016–17

Presidents' Trophy

- 2017–18

Lester Patrick Trophy

- David Poile: 2000–01

Bill Masterton Memorial Trophy

- Steve Sullivan: 2008–09

NHL Foundation Player Award

- Mike Fisher: 2011–12

Mark Messier Leadership Award

- Shea Weber: 2015–16
- Wayne Simmonds: 2018–19

King Clancy Memorial Trophy

- Pekka Rinne: 2020–21

Vezina Trophy

- Pekka Rinne: 2017–18

James Norris Memorial Trophy

- Roman Josi: 2019–20

=== All-Star honors ===
NHL first All-Star team

- Shea Weber: 2010–11, 2011–12
- Pekka Rinne: 2017–18
- Roman Josi: 2019–20, 2021–22

NHL second All-Star team

- Pekka Rinne: 2010–11
- Shea Weber: 2013–14, 2014–15
- P. K. Subban: 2017–18
- Filip Forsberg: 2023–24

NHL All-Rookie Team

- Filip Forsberg: 2014–15
- Juuse Saros: 2017–18
- Alexandre Carrier: 2021–22

NHL All-Star Game selections

- Sergei Krivokrasov: 1998–99
- Kimmo Timonen: 1999–2000, 2003–04, 2006–07
- Tomáš Vokoun: 2003–04
- Jason Arnott: 2007–08
- Shea Weber: 2008–09, 2010–11, 2011–12, 2014–15, 2015–16
- Ryan Suter: 2011–12
- Pekka Rinne: 2014–15, 2015–16, 2017–18, 2018-19
- Filip Forsberg: 2014–15, 2023–24
- Roman Josi: 2015–16, 2018-19, 2019–20, 2021–22
- James Neal: 2015–16
- P. K. Subban: 2016–17, 2017–18
- Juuse Saros: 2021–22, 2022–23

== Franchise records ==
=== Scoring leaders ===
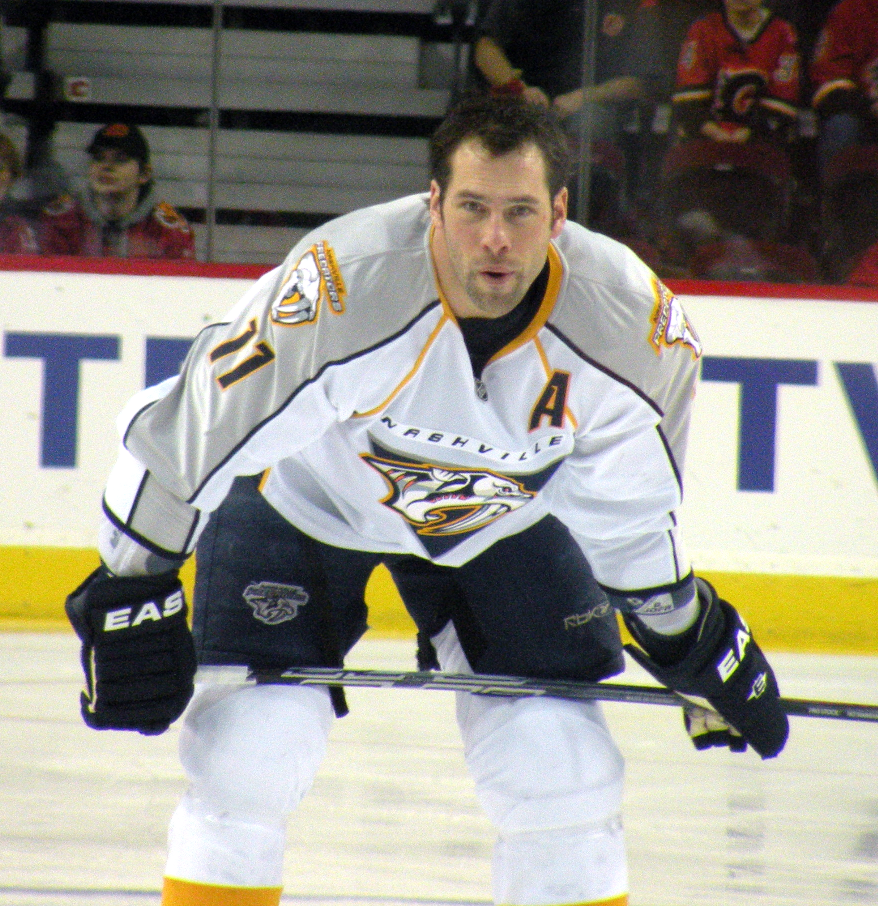
David Legwand is third all-time in franchise points. He was also the final member of the inaugural team to retire or move.

These are the top-ten point-scorers in franchise history. Figures are updated after each completed NHL regular season.

* – current Predators player

Note: Pos = Position; GP = Games played; G = Goals; A = Assists; Pts = Points; P/G = Points per game

Points
Player	Pos	GP	G	A	Pts	P/G
Roman Josi*	D	1,030	203	576	779	.76
Filip Forsberg*	LW	862	358	398	756	.88
David Legwand	C	956	210	356	566	.59
Martin Erat	RW	723	163	318	481	.67
Shea Weber	D	763	166	277	443	.58
Ryan Johansen	C	553	110	252	362	.68
Craig Smith	RW	661	162	168	330	.50
Kimmo Timonen	D	573	79	222	301	.53
Ryan Ellis	D	562	75	195	270	.48
Mattias Ekholm	D	719	62	206	268	.37

Goals
Player	Pos	G
Filip Forsberg*	LW	358
David Legwand	C	210
Roman Josi*	D	203
Shea Weber	D	166
Martin Erat	RW	163
Craig Smith	RW	162
Viktor Arvidsson	LW	127
Mike Fisher	C	111
Ryan Johansen	RW	110
Jason Arnott	C	107

Assists
Player	Pos	A
Roman Josi*	D	576
Filip Forsberg*	LW	398
David Legwand	C	356
Martin Erat	RW	318
Shea Weber	D	277
Ryan Johansen	C	252
Kimmo Timonen	D	222
Mattias Ekholm	D	206
Ryan Suter	D	200
Ryan Ellis	D	195

=== Goaltending leaders ===
These are the top-ten goaltenders in franchise history by wins. Figures are updated after each completed NHL regular season.

- * – current Predators player

Note: GP = Games played; W = Wins; L = Losses; T/O = Ties/Overtime losses; GA = Goal against; GAA = Goals against average; SA = Shots against; SV% = Save percentage; SO = Shutouts

Goaltenders
Player	GP	W	L	T/O	GA	GAA	SA	SV%	SO
Pekka Rinne	683	369	213	75	1,598	2.43	19,225	.917	60
Juuse Saros*	467	230	172	46	1,226	2.74	13,875	.912	27
Tomáš Vokoun	383	161	159	46	922	2.54	10,579	.913	21
Mike Dunham	217	81	104	24	567	2.72	6,274	.910	8
Chris Mason	146	59	50	13	339	2.68	3,777	.910	12
Dan Ellis	110	49	42	8	260	2.64	2,958	.912	10
Carter Hutton	75	33	23	12	173	2.55	1,920	.910	4
Kevin Lankinen	43	20	14	1	105	2.79	1,193	.912	1
Justus Annunen*	51	19	23	3	134	2.90	1,307	.898	1
Anders Lindbäck	38	16	13	4	81	2.53	940	.914	2

=== Individual records ===
- Most games played: David Legwand, 956
- Most games played, goaltender: Pekka Rinne, 630
- Most goals in a season: Filip Forsberg, 48 (2023–24)
- Most assists in a season: Roman Josi, 73 (2021–22)
- Most points in a season: Roman Josi, 96 (2021–22)
- Most penalty minutes in a season: Patrick Côté, 242 (1998–99)
- Most goals in a season, defenseman: Roman Josi, 23 (2021–22 and 2023–24) and Shea Weber, 23 (2008–09 and 2013–14)
- Most points in a season, defenseman: Roman Josi, 96 (2021–22)
- Most goals in a season, rookie: Filip Forsberg, 26 (2014–15)
- Most points in a season, rookie: Filip Forsberg, 63 (2014–15)
- Most wins in a season: Pekka Rinne, 43 (2011–12)
- Most shutouts in a season: Pekka Rinne, 8 (2017–18)
- Most hits in a season: Jeremy Lauzon, 383 (2023-24)

== See also ==
- List of Nashville Predators broadcasters
- List of Nashville Predators general managers
- List of Nashville Predators head coaches
- Nashville Predators Radio Network
