= David Poile =

Canadian-American ice hockey executive

- Hockey Hall of Fame, 2024 (Builder)
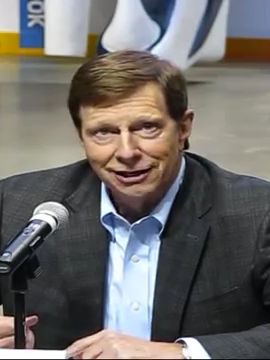
- Poile in 2011
- Born: February 14, 1950 (age 76) Toronto, Ontario, Canada
- Height: 5 ft 11 in (180 cm)
- Weight: 180 lb (82 kg; 12 st 12 lb)
- Position: Right wing
- Shot: Left
- Played for: Rochester Americans
- Playing career: 1968–1971

David Poile (/ˈpɔɪ.əl/ POY-əl, born February 14, 1950) is a Canadian-American retired ice hockey executive and former player. He was the president of hockey operations and general manager for the Nashville Predators of the National Hockey League (NHL) from 1997 to 2023. He is the son of the former NHL player, coach and executive Bud Poile. Poile was inducted into the Hockey Hall of Fame in 2024 as a builder.

== Career ==
Poile was a successful hockey player at Northeastern University, still holding the record for most career hat tricks with 11. While at Northeastern Poile was a member of Phi Sigma Kappa fraternity. Poile began his career in the NHL as an administrative assistant with the then-expansion Atlanta Flames in 1972. Five years after joining the Flames organization he was named as the assistant general manager.

Poile left the Flames to become the vice president and general manager of the Washington Capitals. He served in that capacity for 15 years. During his time in Washington, the Capitals amassed a 594–454–124 record under his management. Poile’s signature transaction was acquiring Rod Langway from the Montreal Canadiens in a five-player trade which was widely considered the deal that saved the Capitals franchise.

After working in Washington, Poile took the position with the then-expansion Nashville Predators in 1997.

Poile served as general manager of the 1998 and 1999 U.S. National Team for the International Ice Hockey Federation World Championships. Poile also served as the general manager for the men's hockey team at the 2014 Olympics, though he was unable to attend the games in Sochi due to a hit in the face with an errant puck during a Nashville Predators morning skate just days prior to his planned departure. He has since not been able to see out of his right eye.

He was awarded the Lester Patrick Trophy in 2001, making him and his father Norman 'Bud' Poile one of six father-son combinations to win the award. In 2017, he won the NHL's General Manager of the Year award after the Predators reached the Stanley Cup Final for the first time in franchise history.

On March 1, 2018, Poile became the winningest general manager in NHL history as the Predators defeated the Edmonton Oilers 4–2, giving him his 1,320th win as a general manager, and surpassing the record previously held by Glen Sather. On February 26, 2023, Poile announced that he would retire as general manager on June 30, 2023, remaining with the Predators as an advisor. Poile amassed a 939-718-60-178 record with the Predators.

== Awards and honors ==
Award	Year	Ref
All-ECAC Hockey Second Team	1969–70	

Sporting positions
Preceded by Roger Crozier	General manager of the Washington Capitals; 1982–1997	Succeeded by George McPhee
Preceded by Position created	General manager of the Nashville Predators; 1998–2023	Succeeded by Barry Trotz
