= Juuse Saros =

Finnish ice hockey player (born 1995)

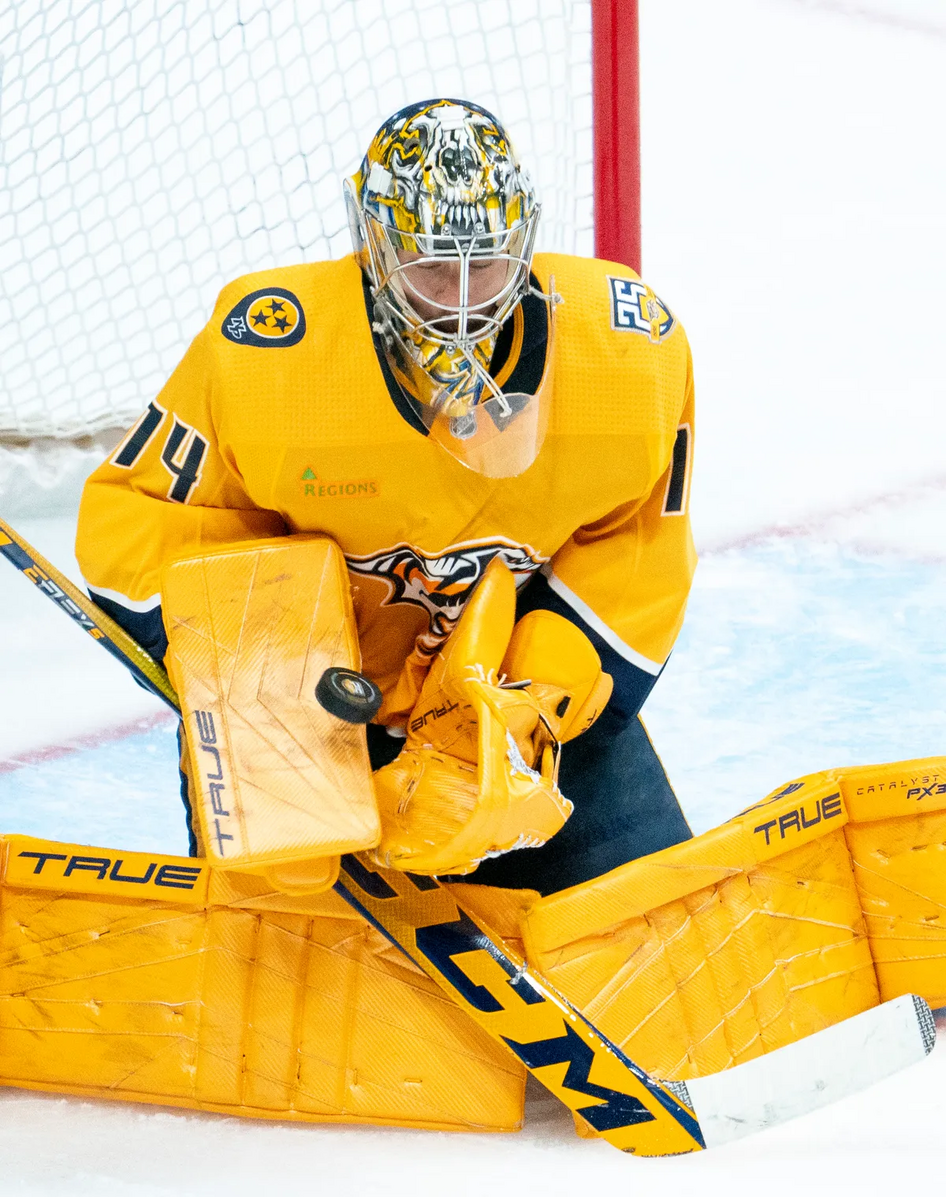
- Saros with the Nashville Predators in 2024
- Born: 19 April 1995 (age 31) Forssa, Finland
- Height: 5 ft 11 in (180 cm)
- Weight: 180 lb (82 kg; 12 st 12 lb)
- Position: Goaltender
- Catches: Left
- NHL team Former teams: Nashville Predators; HPK
- National team: Finland
- NHL draft: 99th overall, 2013; Nashville Predators
- Playing career: 2013–present

Juuse Saros (born 19 April 1995), nicknamed "Juice", is a Finnish professional ice hockey player who is a goaltender for the Nashville Predators of the National Hockey League (NHL). Saros was selected by the Predators in the fourth round (99th overall) of the 2013 NHL entry draft.

Growing up in Finland, Saros played his entire youth career and first three professional seasons with his hometown club, HPK of the Liiga. After the conclusion of the 2014–15 season, Saros joined the Nashville Predators organization in North America and was immediately assigned to their American Hockey League affiliate, the Milwaukee Admirals. Saros found early success with the Admirals and was added to the AHL All-Rookie Team and the AHL All-Star Game. Upon joining the Predators full time in 2018, he became the Predators' new full-time starter following an injury to Pekka Rinne. He finished his rookie season with a 17–10–2 record, a 2.62 goals against average, and a .915 save percentage.

Internationally, Saros has represented Finland at both the junior and senior levels at various tournaments. He has won a silver medal at the 2012 Ivan Hlinka Memorial Tournament, a bronze medal at the 2013 IIHF World U18 Championships, and a gold medal at the 2014 World Junior Ice Hockey Championships. During the 2013 tournament, Saros was named the tournament's Best Goaltender and was later recognized locally as Hämeenlinna's Male Athlete of the Year. At the senior level, Saros has won two silver medals at the 2014 and 2016 IIHF World Championships, as well as bronze at the 2026 Winter Olympics.

== Personal life ==
Saros was born on 19 April 1995, in Forssa, Finland, to parents Pekka and Leila. His parents both come from athletic backgrounds as his father is a basketball official while his mother swam collegiately in the United States. He grew up with his older brother Eemeli and the two often played hockey together, with Saros being the goaltender. In 2021, Saros became engaged to his longtime girlfriend Minna Varis. They were married in July 2023.

Saros is a well-known dog lover, with his own dogs appearing on his goalie masks and tattoos. He has raised and donated thousands of dollars to pet related charities. He also serves as the ambassador of the Preds Pet Club, a regular meeting of Predators fans and their pets at Nashville-area parks.

== Playing career ==
=== Finland ===
While Saros was born in Forssa, he played his entire youth career and first three professional seasons with his hometown club HPK of the Liiga. He started playing ice hockey at the age of nine and originally participated in the role of a defenceman before switching to goaltending at the age of 13. As a teenager, Saros was also enrolled at Hämeenlinna Lyceum High School, a specialized sports high school in Hämeenlinna. The school enabled him to take morning courses, allowed for extended absences due to hockey, and helped him to graduate in three years. During his 2011–12 season with the HPK Jr. team in the U18 SM-sarja, Saros maintained a 2.53 goals against average (GAA) and .910 save percentage (SV) through 31 games. He then represented Team Finland for the first time on the international level at the 2012 IIHF World U18 Championships as a backup goaltender for Joonas Korpisalo. In August, he represented Team Finland at the 2012 Ivan Hlinka Memorial Tournament where he helped them win a silver medal.

Saros returned to the HPK Jr. team for the 2012–13 season, which was one of his best in the league. He maintained a 1.86 GAA and .933 SV over 37 games and was named to the Jr. A SM-Liiga All-Star Team at the end of the season. As a result, he was named the best player in the league and awarded the Jorma Valtonen Award as the league's top goaltender. In April, Saros was again selected to represent Team Finland at the 2013 IIHF World U18 Championships, where he outperformed nearly every goaltender at the tournament. He finished second among goaltenders with a 1.86 GAA and .946 save percentage to lead Finland to a bronze medal. As a result, Saros was named the tournament's Best Goaltender and recognized locally as Hämeenlinna's Male Athlete of the Year. Due to his performance at both the local and national level, Saros was considered the best European goaltender available at the 2013 NHL entry draft. However, his short stature resulted in numerous teams passing on him. Saros later recalled one team requested he get an x-ray scan of his bones to see if he would grow beyond his 5'11 stature. Saros was eventually drafted in the fourth round, 99th overall, by the Nashville Predators but was expected to return to the HPK for the 2013–14 season.

Following the NHL draft, Saros joined the HPK for his first professional season in the Liiga. As a rookie, he maintained a 1.76 GAA and .923 SV through 44 games to be named the league's Rookie of the Year. He also participated in the 2014 World Junior Ice Hockey Championships for Team Finland, where he helped lead them to their third World Juniors gold medal. During the tournament, Saros led all goaltenders with a 1.57 GAA and was voted to the tournament all-star team. After the season concluded, Saros was named to his first senior level tournament with Team Finland although he never played in the 2014 IIHF World Championship. In June 2014, Saros began his mandatory military service in Finland but was temporarily allowed to compete in USA Hockey's National Junior Evaluation Camp.

Saros returned to the HPK for his second professional season but struggled early on to return to his rookie form. Through five games in September, Saros maintained a .896 SV which improved to a .929 SV through seven games in October. He finished the 2014–15 season with a .929 SV, 2.14 GAA, and six shutouts through 47 games. He was also drafted by the Dinamo Minsk in the 2015 Kontinental Hockey League Draft.

=== North American career ===
==== 2015–2016 ====
Upon concluding the 2014–15 season in Finland, Saros signed a three-year, entry-level contract with the Nashville Predators to begin his professional career in North America. After attending the Predators training camp, Saros was assigned to their American Hockey League (AHL) affiliate, the Milwaukee Admirals, to begin the 2015–16 season. Saros recorded an impressive 8–2–0 record, a 2.40 goals-against average, a .919 save percentage through 10 games with the Admirals. As a result of his play and various injuries to the lineup, Saros was recalled to the NHL level on 28 November 2015. He subsequently made his NHL debut that night and stopped 20 shots in a 4–1 loss to the Buffalo Sabres. Upon returning to the AHL, Saros continued his winning streak and recorded an eight-game win streak from 5 November to 5 December. Saros picked up another five game winning streak in late February and early March while also leading all rookies with a 2.34 goals-against average. He finished his rookie season compiling a 29–10–0 record while also making over 1,000 saves in 40 games. As a result of his impressive rookie season, Saros was named to the AHL's All-Rookie Team and won a silver medal with Team Finland in the 2016 IIHF World Championship.

==== 2016–2017 ====
Following his impressive rookie season, Saros participated in the Predators prospect tournament and training camp before being reassigned to the AHL for the 2016–17 season. In his first three games with the Admirals, Saros posted a 3–0–0 record with a .964 save percentage and 1.00 goals-against average. He earned his first emergency callup of the season on 22 October and made his NHL season debut the following night. Saros made 34 saves in his first NHL win against the Pittsburgh Penguins on 23 October 2016. Immediately following the game, Saros was one of three players reassigned to the AHL. His next recall would come weeks later on 8 November. At the time of the recall, he had earned three more wins and one loss while posting a 1.99 goals-against average and .929 save percentage. Saros was returned to the AHL on 16 November but was recalled again on 24 November. Despite his numerous recalls in November, Saros earned the AHL's CCM/AHL Goaltender of the Month award for going 5-0-0 with a 1.37 goals-against average and .955 save percentage during the month. He eventually earned his first career NHL shutout in his seventh NHL game on 30 December 2016 by making 25 saves against the St. Louis Blues. Despite only playing in 13 games for the Admirals, Saros was named to the 2017 AHL All-Star Classic on 5 January. While remaining at the NHL level through January, Saros recorded a career-high 35 saves on the way to his fourth victory of the season in a 2–1 win over the Boston Bruins. Throughout his eight starts of the season, Saros recorded a .950 save percentage by allowing only 12 goals on 242 shots. After playing in two more games for the Predators, Saros was assigned to the AHL on 4 February. He was recalled again later in the month and played two more games before rejoining the Admirals on 12 February. Saros later tied his career high 35 saves, including 19 in the first period alone, to lift the Predators to a 4–3 win over the Columbus Blue Jackets on 19 February. By the end of February, Saros sported a 7–5–3 record and his 2.21 goals against average eighth among NHL goalies. Throughout the month of March, Saros improved his record to 9–8–3 with a 2.32 goals-against average and a .924 save percentage. As the Predators clinched a spot in the 2017 Stanley Cup playoffs, Saros finished the regular season with a 10–8–3 record, a 2.35 goals-against average, and .923 save percentage in 21 games. He served as backup to Pekka Rinne throughout the Predators playoff berth and did not play a minute until the 2017 Stanley Cup Finals. Saros made his NHL postseason debut during Game 2 after Rinne was pulled after allowing four goals on 25 shots. Saros made two saves in his debut as the Predators fell to the Pittsburgh Penguins 4–1. He played his second postseason game in Game 5 of the Finals after Rinne let in three goals on nine shots in the first period.

==== 2017–2018 ====
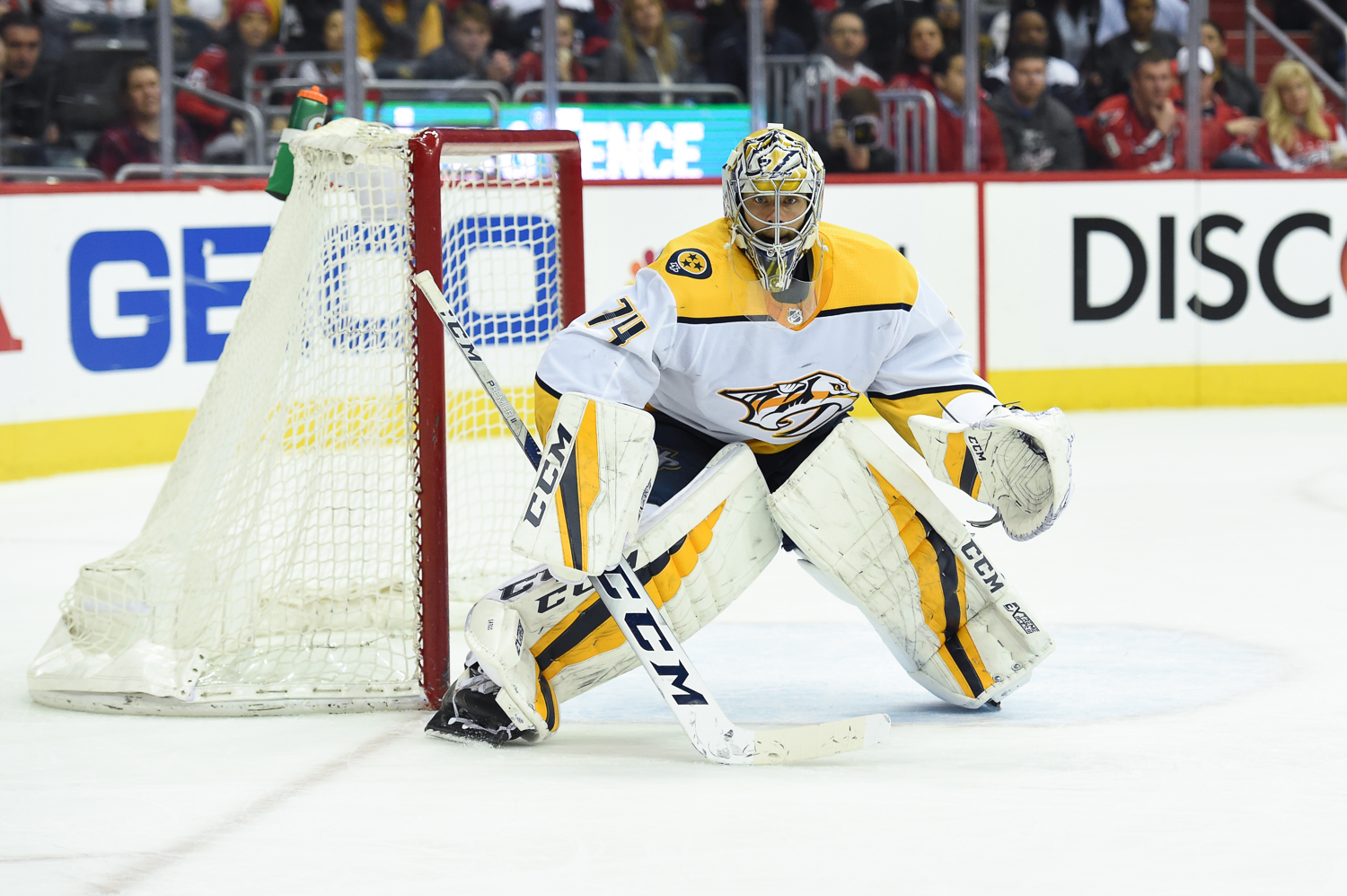
Saros with the Predators in 2018

Leading up to the 2017–18 season, Saros was listed as a Rookie To Watch by NHL.com. He was expected to continue serving as backup for Rinne and play around 25–30 games. Saros started in net three times in October but all ended with poor results. He earned his first win of the season on 4 November against the Los Angeles Kings but was reassigned to the Admirals on 16 November. Saros appeared in two games for Milwaukee during the reassignment, losing both games, before he rejoined the Predators on 20 November. He made one more start in November, with the Predators losing in overtime, before rejoining the Admirals. Saros appeared in two more games for the Admirals before rejoining the Predators on 3 December. Upon returning to the lineup, Saros recorded a career-best 43 saves in a 5–2 win over the Dallas Stars on 5 December. After another assignment to the Admirals, Saros beat his career-high by setting a franchise record for the most saves in a shutout on 14 December 2017. During the 4–0 win over the Edmonton Oilers, Saros recorded 46 saves to clinch the franchise record and lead the Predators to their 15th win in 19 games. By the end of the month, Saros had a record of 3–0–1 by allowing only five goals and stopping 169 of 174 shots against in five appearances. He also maintained a 1.54 goals-against average and a .956 save percentage over seven games. Saros ended 2017 with a shutout to help the Predators end their three-game losing streak and move into first place in the Central Division. During the Predators five-day bye week, Saros was assigned to the Admirals. He went 2–1–0 in a three-game stint with Milwaukee, stopping 94 of 97 shots against, before returning to the NHL. By mid-February, Saros had a 6–5–5 record, a .926 save percentage, and a 2.39 goals-against average. He earned praise from Predators' coach Peter Laviolette who stated that the team had confidence in him. By mid-March, Saros helped the Predators match their franchise record of 14 consecutive games with at least a point and clinch a playoff spot in the 2018 Stanley Cup playoffs. On 29 March, Saros made 39 saves to help the Predators set a new franchise point record with 111 points. Saors subsequently concluded the 2017–18 regular season with an 11–5–7 record, a 2.44 goals-against average, and .925 save percentage. He also finished the season ranked ninth among all NHL goaltenders in save percentage. Saros became the second Predators player to be named to the All-Rookie Team since Filip Forsberg in 2014–15. During the playoffs, Saros did not allow a goal in 65:11 before replacing Rinne in Game 7 of their Western Conference Second Round matchup against the Winnipeg Jets. After Rinne let in two goals, Saros allowed one goal in the second period and one in the third, making 14 saves in the 5–1.

==== 2018–2019 ====
Following their elimination from the 2018 playoffs, Saros signed a three-year, $4.5 million contract extension to remain with the Predators on 16 July. Unlike the previous season, Saros began the 2018–19 season with a 3–0–0 record, a 2.22 GAA, and .917 save percentage. Once Rinne was placed on injured reserve on 20 October, Saros became the Predators' new full-time starter. While Rinne was injured, Saros added three more wins and maintained a 2.50 goals-against average and a .917 save percentage. On 24 January, Saros stopped a career-best 47 shots as the Predators defeated the Vegas Golden Knights 2–1. A few months later, on 25 March, Saros made 29 saves in a win over the Minnesota Wild to help the Predators clinch a berth in the 2019 Stanley Cup playoffs. Saros finished the 2018–19 regular season with a 17–10–2 record, a 2.62 goals against average, a .915 save percentage, and three shutouts over 31 games. When the Predators met the Dallas Stars in the Western Conference First Round, Saros played one game in relief for Rinne after he relinquished four goals on eight shots in the first period of Game 4. He made 20 saves in relief as the Stars won the game 5–1. Rinne replaced Saros for the next two games although the Predators fell to the Stars in six games.

==== 2019–2020 ====
The following season, Saros played a then career-high 40 games during the shortened 2019–20 season. He began the season as the steadfast backup to Rinne, but they transitioned into an even split rather than starter/backup roles as the season continued. The Predators began the season with a six-game point streak to maintain an 8–4–2 record by 2 November. However, they then suffered through a six-game losing streak in November which was snapped on 23 November. On 10 December, Saros made 24 saves to lift the Predators to their 800th overall win in franchise history. Through 18 games by the end of December, Saros had a 5–7–3 record with a 3.23 goals-against average and .890 save percentage. He was on pace for 34 starts, the most by any of Rinne's partners since 2013–14. As the Predators continued to struggle to win games, the team fired head coach Laviolette in early January and replaced him with John Hynes. Under Hynes, Saros began to take up more of a starter role. When the season was paused due to the COVID-19 pandemic in March, Saros had maintained a 12–5–0 in his final 17 starts dating back to 12 January. He also tied for first in shutouts, tied for third in save percentage, ranked second in wins, and fourth in goals-against average. His 11 career shutouts were also the most by any active NHL goaltender his age or younger. When the NHL resumed play and the Predators faced the Arizona Coyotes in the 2020 Stanley Cup Qualifiers, Saros was tapped as the starter for Game 1. This broke Rinne's run of 89 consecutive playoff starts since 2010, the second-longest active streak behind Henrik Lundqvist. Saros made 33 saves in Game 1 of the Qualifiers although the Predators fell to the Coyotes 4–3. He bounced back the following game and earned his first postseason win on 4 August after making 24 saves to even the series 1–1. Although he would start all four games, this would prove to be his only win as he finished the series with a 3.22 GAA and a .895 save percentage.

==== 2020–2021 ====
Due to the COVID-19 pandemic, various changes were made to the NHL's schedule for the 2020–21 season. The season was delayed until 13 January 2021 and shortened to 56 games. The Predators were also sequestered into the Central Division and only competed against the Carolina Hurricanes, Chicago Blackhawks, Columbus Blue Jackets, Detroit Red Wings, Florida Panthers, Dallas Stars, and Tampa Bay Lightning. In this unique division, Saros and the Predators maintained a 10–11–0 record over the first two months of the season. During a game against the Hurricanes on 2 March, Saros suffered a head-on-head injury with Hurricanes forward Nino Niederreiter. After spending seven days on injured reserve, Saros returned to full form with the Predators on 17 March. In his first three games back, Saros allowed just two goals on 120 shots and recorded his first shutout of the season. He continued to find success through the remainder of the week and compiled a 3–0–0 record, 0.67 goals-against average, .976 save percentage, and one shutout. As such, Saros was recognized as the NHL's Third Star of the Week ending on 28 March. Following his success in March, Saros began playing in more games for the Predators as he became their de facto starter. By the start of May, Saros had won a career-high 18 games and was 18–10–1 overall while Rinne had been limited to only 22 games. On 8 May, Saros made 21 saves to lead the Predators to a 3–1 win over the Carolina Hurricanes and thus clinch their spot in the 2021 Stanley Cup Playoffs. Saros was credited for being an integral part of the Predators turnaround in the second half of the season. He finished the season with a career-high 21 wins over 35 games, tied for second in the league with a .927 save percentage, and tied for fifth with a 2.28 goals-against average. As with the previous season, Saros returned as the Predators starter for the playoffs as they faced the Hurricanes in Round One. After the Predators began falling behind in the series, Saros made a franchise-record 58 saves to help lead the Predators to a 4–3 win in double overtime of Game 4. Despite his efforts, the Predators would fall to the Hurricanes in six games.

==== 2021–2022 ====
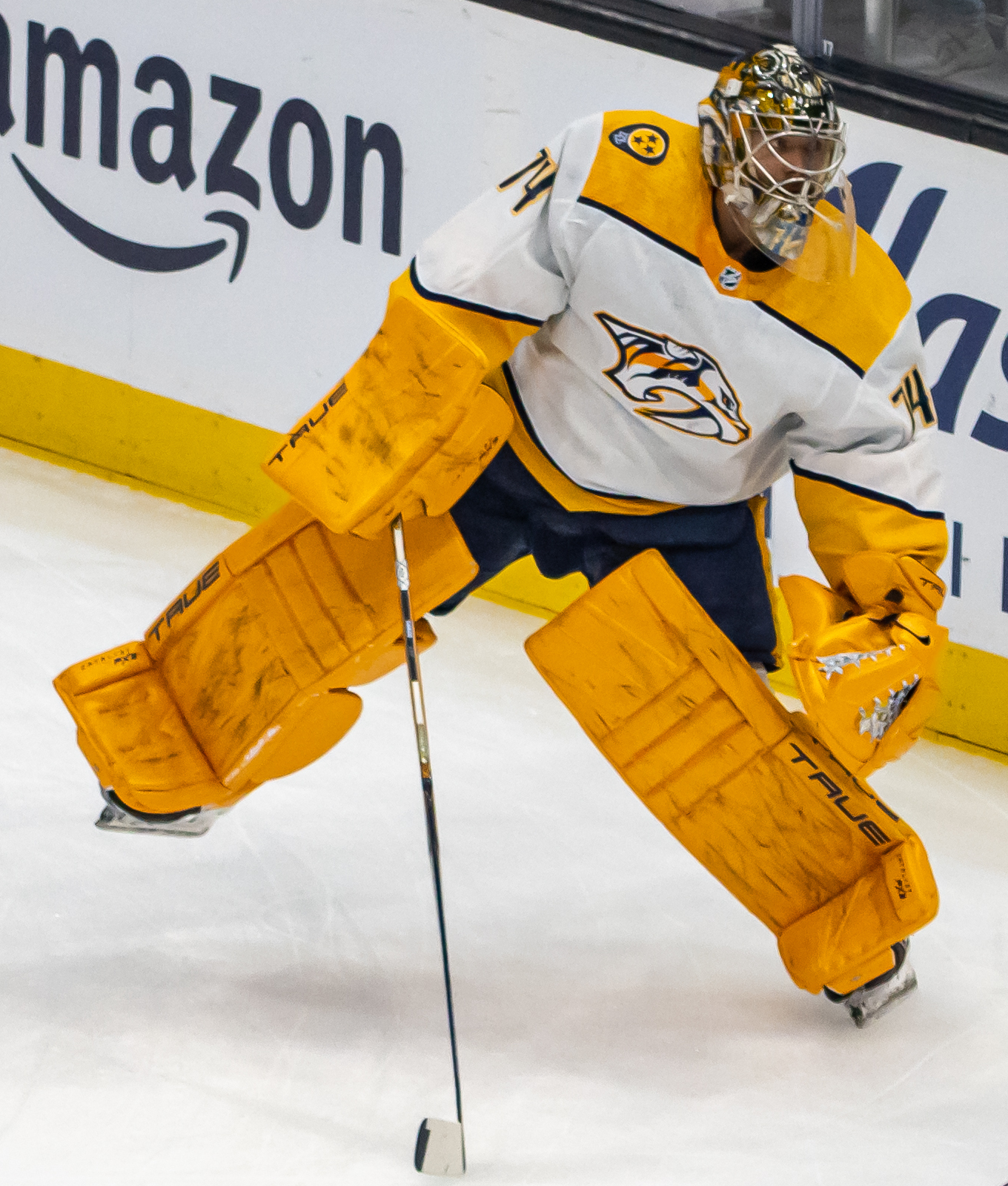
Saros with the Nashville Predators in November 2022

In July 2021, Rinne announced his retirement from the NHL, thus making Saros the default starter for the new season. As a restricted free agent, Saros signed a four-year, $20 million extension with the Predators on 16 August 2021. With Rinne gone, the Predators signed former Calgary Flames netminder David Rittich as Saros' goaltending partner. The 2021–22 season was one of Saros' strongest, and he was widely credited as a key factor in the Predators qualifying for the 2022 Stanley Cup playoffs. Saros and the Predators began the season with a 5–4–0 record and a four-game win streak through late October and early November. On 30 November, Saros recorded his first shutout of the season as the Predators beat the Blue Jackets for the 40th time in franchise history. Saros was one of the league's leading goaltenders through January as he maintained an 8–2–2 record with a 2.49 goals-against average and .934 save percentage. His efforts were recognized with a selection as the NHL's Second Star of the Month and his first 2022 National Hockey League All-Star Game. On 1 February, Saros earned his 100th career NHL win to help the Predators reach 60 points through 46 games. He finished the regular season as one of the league's best goaltenders with a 38–25–3 record, a 2.64 GAA, and .918 save percentage. As such, he was named a finalist for the Vezina Trophy, awarded to the league's best goaltender. He finished third in voting behind Jacob Markstrom and the eventual winner Igor Shesterkin. However, Saros suffered a foot injury in the final week of the regular season that took him out of the postseason entirely. This was dubbed "a real dagger" to the Predators' playoff hopes by hockey pundits. With Saros absent, the team was swept by the Colorado Avalanche in the first round.

==== 2022–2023 ====
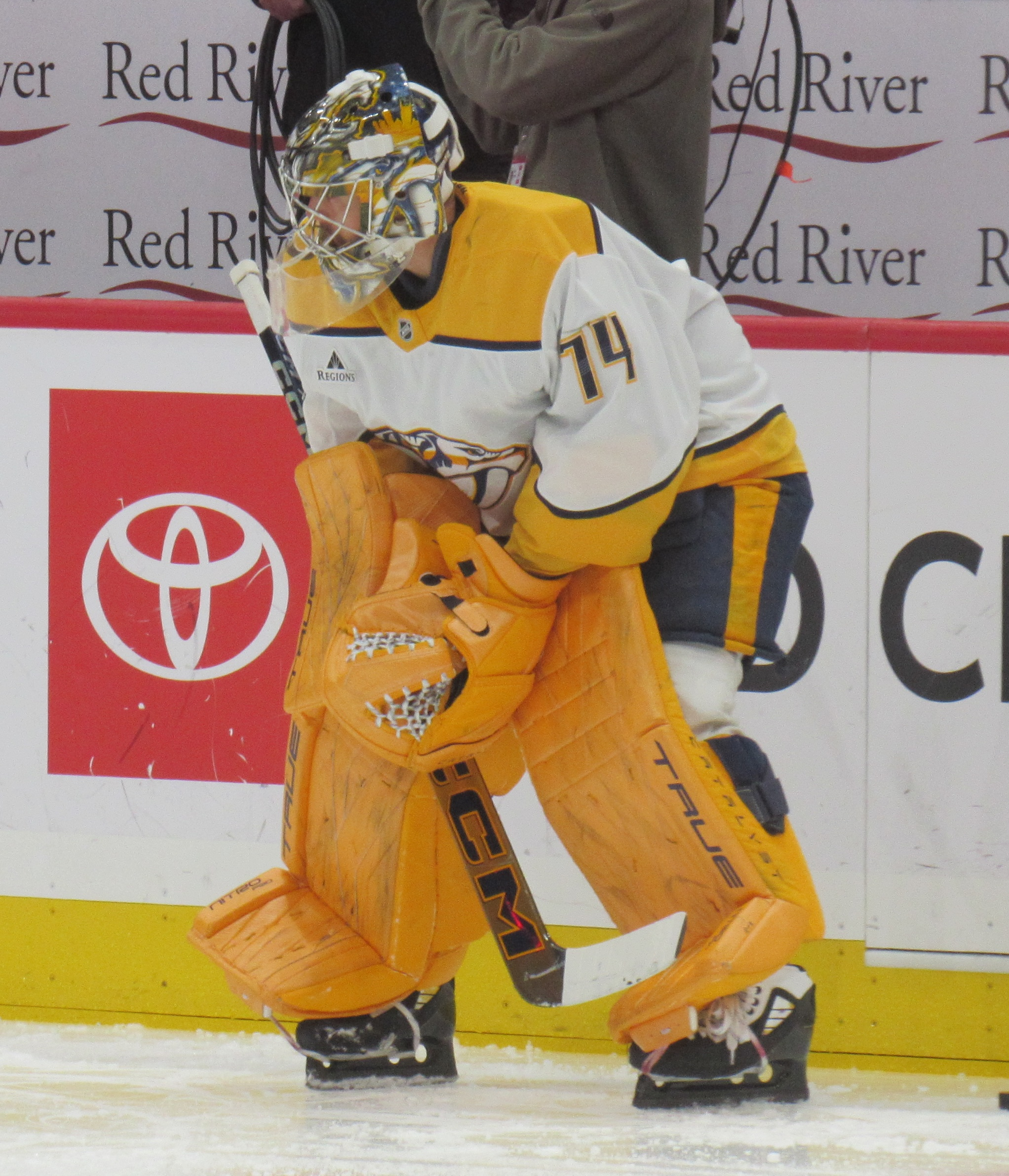
Saros with the Predators in 2026

Due to his success in the previous season, Saros was named an early favourite to win the Vezina at the start of the 2022–23 season. However, the Predators struggled to win games during this season and failed to qualify for the 2023 Stanley Cup playoffs for the first time in eight years. Following the departure of Rittich in the offseason, the Predators signed free agent Kevin Lankinen as Saros' backup netminder. On 5 January 2023, Saros made a franchise-record 64 saves in the Predators' 5–3 win over the Carolina Hurricanes. After following this game up with a 38-save shutout on 9 January against the Ottawa Senators, Saros tied with Byron Dafoe for seventh place on the NHL's list of most saves by a goaltender in two consecutive starts. Saros finished the season having started 63 games, second among all league goaltenders, while maintaining a .919 save % and a 2.69 goals-against average. He led the league in saves with 1,928, shots against, and time on ice. Although he was not a top-three finalist for the Vezina, Saros finished in fourth place with two first-place votes, two second-place votes, and eight third-place votes.

==== 2023–2024 ====
After failing to qualify for the playoffs, the Predators re-signed Lankinen as Saros' backup netminder and also acquired various veteran players in the offseason including Ryan O'Reilly and Luke Schenn. Following his 163rd NHL win against the Philadelphia Flyers on 21 December 2023, Saros surpassed Tomáš Vokoun for second place on the franchises all-time win list. He later bested Rinne's franchise record by recording a point for the Predators (win or overtime loss) through 14 consecutive games. From 17 February to 26 March, Saros maintained a 12–0–2 record with a 1.76 GAA and a .936 SV%. His efforts also helped the Predators set a new franchise record by failing to lose in regulation through 17 consecutive games. Saros finished the regular-season with a 35–24–5 record and set a record for the second-most career wins in franchise history. He subsequently placed fifth in Vezina Trophy voting. Saros then started all six games of the Predators first-round series. On 1 July 2024, Saros signed an eight-year, $61.92 million contract extension with the Predators.

== International play ==
Medal record

Representing Finland

Ice hockey

Olympic Games
Bronze medal – third place	2026 Milano Cortina	

He represented Finland at the 2026 Winter Olympics and won a bronze medal.

== Career statistics ==
=== Regular season and playoffs ===
			Regular season									Playoffs
Season	Team	League	GP	W	L	T/OT	MIN	GA	SO	GAA	SV%	GP	W	L	MIN	GA	SO	GAA	SV%
2013–14	HPK	Liiga	44	17	16	9	2,625	77	7	1.76	.928	6	2	4	367	14	0	2.29	.903
2014–15	HPK	Liiga	47	13	18	16	2,834	101	6	2.14	.929	—	—	—	—	—	—	—	—
2015–16	Milwaukee Admirals	AHL	38	29	8	0	2,248	84	4	2.24	.920	2	0	2	117	5	0	2.57	.891
2015–16	Nashville Predators	NHL	1	0	1	0	58	3	0	3.10	.870	—	—	—	—	—	—	—	—
2016–17	Milwaukee Admirals	AHL	15	13	2	0	903	28	1	1.86	.934	—	—	—	—	—	—	—	—
2016–17	Nashville Predators	NHL	21	10	8	3	1,200	47	1	2.35	.923	2	0	0	57	3	0	3.18	.824
2017–18	Nashville Predators	NHL	26	11	5	7	1,497	61	3	2.44	.925	4	0	0	114	2	0	1.05	.952
2017–18	Milwaukee Admirals	AHL	9	3	5	1	542	26	1	2.88	.906	—	—	—	—	—	—	—	—
2018–19	Nashville Predators	NHL	31	17	10	2	1,697	74	3	2.62	.915	1	0	0	46	1	0	1.33	.952
2019–20	Nashville Predators	NHL	40	17	12	4	2,177	98	4	2.70	.914	4	1	3	242	13	0	3.22	.895
2020–21	Nashville Predators	NHL	36	21	11	1	2,052	78	3	2.28	.927	6	2	4	432	20	0	2.78	.921
2021–22	Nashville Predators	NHL	67	38	25	3	3,932	173	4	2.64	.918	—	—	—	—	—	—	—	—
2022–23	Nashville Predators	NHL	64	33	23	7	3,810	171	2	2.69	.919	—	—	—	—	—	—	—	—
2023–24	Nashville Predators	NHL	64	35	24	5	3,625	173	3	2.86	.906	6	2	4	357	12	0	2.02	.900
2024–25	Nashville Predators	NHL	58	20	31	6	3,357	167	4	2.98	.896	—	—	—	—	—	—	—	—
2025–26	Nashville Predators	NHL	59	28	22	8	3,433	181	0	3.16	.894	—	—	—	—	—	—	—	—
Liiga totals			91	30	34	25	5,459	178	13	1.97	.929	6	2	4	367	14	0	2.29	.903
NHL totals			467	230	172	46	26,836	1,325	27	2.74	.912	23	5	11	1,247	51	0	2.45	.911

=== International ===
Year	Team	Event	Result	GP	W	L	T	MIN	GA	SO	GAA	SV%
2013	Finland	U18	3rd place, bronze medalist(s)	7	5	2	—	419	13	1	1.86	.946
2014	Finland	WJC	1st place, gold medalist(s)	6	5	1	—	345	9	0	1.57	.943
2015	Finland	WJC	7th	2	0	2	—	119	6	0	3.03	.875
2015	Finland	WC	6th	1	1	0	—	60	0	1	0.00	1.000
2016	Finland	WC	2nd place, silver medalist(s)	2	2	0	—	120	0	2	0.00	1.000
2025	Finland	4NF	4th	2	0	2	—	91	6	0	3.96	.870
2025	Finland	WC	7th	6	4	2	—	359	10	0	1.67	.943
2026	Finland	OG	3rd place, bronze medalist(s)	6	4	2	—	360	10	1	1.66	.940
Junior totals				15	10	5	—	883	28	1	1.90	.937
Senior totals				17	11	6	—	990	26	4	1.58	.743

== Awards and honours ==
Honours	Year
Jr. A
Jorma Valtonen Award	2013
Teemu Selänne Award	2013
First All-Star Team	2013
Liiga
Rookie of the Year	2014
AHL
AHL All-Rookie Team	2016
AHL All-Star Game	2017
NHL
NHL All-Rookie Team	2018
NHL All-Star Game	2022, 2023
