= Jason Arnott =

Canadian ice hockey player (born 1974)

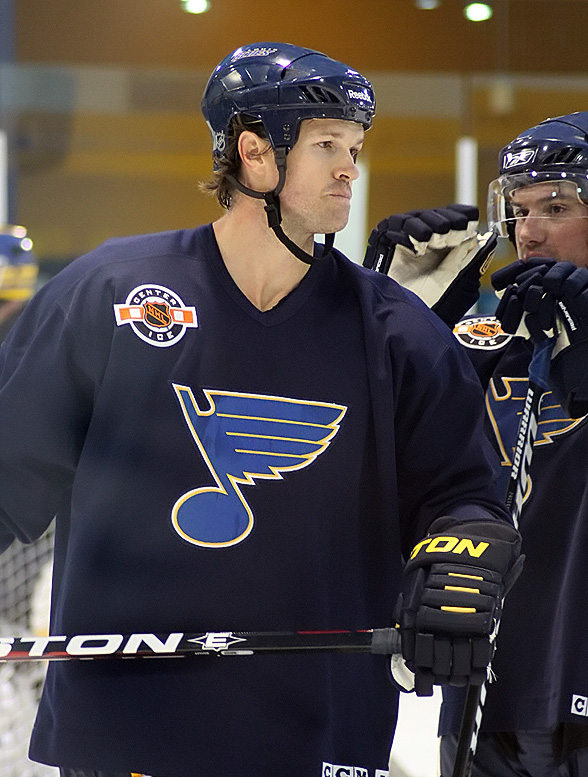
- Born: October 11, 1974 (age 52) Collingwood, Ontario, Canada
- Height: 6 ft 5 in (196 cm)
- Weight: 220 lb (100 kg; 15 st 10 lb)
- Position: Centre
- Shot: Right
- Played for: Edmonton Oilers; New Jersey Devils; Dallas Stars; Nashville Predators; Washington Capitals; St. Louis Blues
- National team: Canada
- NHL draft: 7th overall, 1993; Edmonton Oilers
- Playing career: 1993–2013
Medal record
Representing Canada
Ice hockey
World Championships
| Gold medal – first place | 1994 Bolzano |

Jason William Arnott (born October 11, 1974) is a Canadian former professional ice hockey player.

He began his National Hockey League career with the Edmonton Oilers in 1993–94 after being selected seventh overall in the 1993 NHL entry draft and was named to the NHL All-Rookie Team. A two-time NHL All-Star, Arnott won the Stanley Cup with the New Jersey Devils in 2000, scoring the championship-winning goal in the second overtime of Game 6. He played for the Dallas Stars before joining the Nashville Predators in 2006, where he served as captain for three seasons.

== Playing career ==
=== Minor/Junior ===
Arnott grew up playing for his hometown Wasaga Beach Stars "DD" of the OMHA. In his Bantam year, he signed with the Stayner Siskins Jr. C. club of the OHA for the 1989–90 season.

In 1990–91, Arnott played Jr.B. hockey for the Lindsay Century 21 Bears of the OHA. Later that year, he was selected in the first round, 16th overall, of the 1991 Ontario Hockey League (OHL) Priority Selection by the Oshawa Generals. He was then drafted by the Edmonton Oilers in the first round, seventh overall at the 1993 NHL entry draft following an impressive junior career with the Generals.

=== Professional ===
In 1993–94, as a rookie, Arnott played 78 games as a left winger, scoring 68 points and finishing as the runner-up to future teammate Martin Brodeur for the Calder Memorial Trophy for rookie of the year. On January 4, 1998, Arnott was traded to the New Jersey Devils along with Bryan Muir in exchange for Valeri Zelepukin and Bill Guerin. As a member of the "A Line" on the Devils with Patrik Eliáš and Petr Sýkora, he led the team to the 2000 Stanley Cup championship, scoring the Cup-winning goal at 8:20 of double overtime in game six against the Dallas Stars.

On March 19, 2002, Arnott was traded to the Dallas Stars with Randy McKay in exchange for Joe Nieuwendyk and Jamie Langenbrunner. In 2005–06, Arnott had a career-high 76 points for Dallas and scored 32 goals, the most since his rookie season, in which he had 33. He also set a career-high of 44 assists. In the off-season, he signed a five-year, $22.5 million contract as an unrestricted free agent with the Nashville Predators. He was named the Predators' fourth captain in the franchise's history on September 12, 2007.

On June 19, 2010, Arnott was traded back to his Stanley Cup-winning team, the New Jersey Devils, in exchange for forward Matt Halischuk and a second-round pick in 2011. This was the first-ever trade between the Devils and the Predators. With the Devils, Arnott played alongside captain Jamie Langenbrunner, his original counterpart in his trade to the Stars in 2002.

On February 28, 2011, Arnott was again traded away from the New Jersey Devils, this time to the Washington Capitals, in exchange for Dave Steckel and a second-round pick in 2012.

On March 9, 2011, Arnott recorded his 900th career point against the team that drafted him, the Edmonton Oilers, in a 5–0 shutout victory. On April 2, 2011, he scored his 400th career goal in a 5–4 overtime victory against the Buffalo Sabres. On July 6, 2011, Arnott signed a free-agent contract with the St. Louis Blues.

After scoring 17 goals with 17 assists in 72 games during the 2011–12 season, the Blues opted not to re-sign Arnott. On January 26, 2013, he then signed a one-year deal with the New York Rangers worth approximately $1.6–$1.7 million. The deal, however, was not finalized when Arnott failed his physical and was not cleared to play by Rangers' doctors.

On November 5, 2013, Arnott announced his retirement from the NHL after 18 seasons in the NHL. In October 2014, it was announced that Arnott was hired as a part-time scout for the St. Louis Blues.

== Awards ==
- Named to the NHL All-Rookie Team in 1994
- Played in the NHL All-Star Game in 1997 and 2008
- Won a Stanley Cup with the New Jersey Devils in 2000

== Records ==
- Set the Nashville Predators record for most goals in one season, 33 in 2008–09. The record has since been surpassed by Viktor Arvidsson when he scored his 34th goal of the 2018–19 season on 4/7/2019.
- Scored the overtime Stanley Cup-winning goal with the New Jersey Devils in 2000

== Personal life ==
Arnott was born in Collingwood, Ontario and was raised in Wasaga Beach.

Arnott's wife Dina is a former successful fashion model. Currently, she is an interior designer whose work has been published in Elle and House and Home. They reside in Dallas and Southern California with their 2 children, Chase and Lola. Arnott also has an older son, Draven, from a previous relationship who currently resides in Edmonton.

Arnott's cousins, Burke and Stacey Dales, were both professional athletes; Burke was a punter for nine seasons in the Canadian Football League who also attended training camp with the Pittsburgh Steelers, and Stacey was a two-time All-American in basketball at the University of Oklahoma who played five seasons in the Women's National Basketball Association and is currently a reporter for NFL Network.

== Career statistics ==
=== Regular season and playoffs ===
| | | | Regular season | | | | | Playoffs |
| Season | Team | League | GP | G | A | Pts | PIM | GP | G | A | Pts | PIM |
|---|---|---|---|---|---|---|---|---|---|---|---|---|
| 1988–89 | Wasaga Beach Stars Bantam DD | OMHA | 33 | 62 | 34 | 96 | 28 | — | — | — | — | — |
| 1989–90 | Stayner Siskins | GMOJHL | 34 | 21 | 31 | 52 | 12 | — | — | — | — | — |
| 1990–91 | Lindsay Bears | COJHL | 42 | 17 | 44 | 61 | 10 | 8 | 9 | 8 | 17 | 6 |
| 1991–92 | Oshawa Generals | OHL | 57 | 9 | 15 | 24 | 12 | — | — | — | — | — |
| 1992–93 | Oshawa Generals | OHL | 46 | 51 | 47 | 98 | 74 | 13 | 9 | 9 | 18 | 20 |
| 1993–94 | Edmonton Oilers | NHL | 78 | 33 | 35 | 68 | 104 | — | — | — | — | — |
| 1994–95 | Edmonton Oilers | NHL | 42 | 15 | 22 | 37 | 128 | — | — | — | — | — |
| 1995–96 | Edmonton Oilers | NHL | 64 | 28 | 31 | 59 | 87 | — | — | — | — | — |
| 1996–97 | Edmonton Oilers | NHL | 67 | 19 | 38 | 57 | 92 | 12 | 3 | 6 | 9 | 18 |
| 1997–98 | Edmonton Oilers | NHL | 35 | 5 | 13 | 18 | 78 | — | — | — | — | — |
| 1997–98 | New Jersey Devils | NHL | 35 | 5 | 10 | 15 | 21 | 5 | 0 | 2 | 2 | 0 |
| 1998–99 | New Jersey Devils | NHL | 74 | 27 | 27 | 54 | 79 | 7 | 2 | 2 | 4 | 4 |
| 1999–2000 | New Jersey Devils | NHL | 76 | 22 | 34 | 56 | 51 | 23 | 8 | 12 | 20 | 18 |
| 2000–01 | New Jersey Devils | NHL | 54 | 21 | 34 | 55 | 75 | 23 | 8 | 7 | 15 | 16 |
| 2001–02 | New Jersey Devils | NHL | 63 | 22 | 19 | 41 | 59 | — | — | — | — | — |
| 2001–02 | Dallas Stars | NHL | 10 | 3 | 1 | 4 | 6 | — | — | — | — | — |
| 2002–03 | Dallas Stars | NHL | 72 | 23 | 24 | 47 | 51 | 11 | 3 | 2 | 5 | 6 |
| 2003–04 | Dallas Stars | NHL | 73 | 21 | 36 | 57 | 66 | 5 | 1 | 1 | 2 | 2 |
| 2005–06 | Dallas Stars | NHL | 81 | 32 | 44 | 76 | 102 | 5 | 0 | 3 | 3 | 4 |
| 2006–07 | Nashville Predators | NHL | 68 | 27 | 27 | 54 | 48 | 5 | 2 | 1 | 3 | 2 |
| 2007–08 | Nashville Predators | NHL | 79 | 28 | 44 | 72 | 54 | 4 | 1 | 0 | 1 | 4 |
| 2008–09 | Nashville Predators | NHL | 65 | 33 | 24 | 57 | 49 | — | — | — | — | — |
| 2009–10 | Nashville Predators | NHL | 63 | 19 | 27 | 46 | 26 | 6 | 2 | 0 | 2 | 0 |
| 2010–11 | New Jersey Devils | NHL | 62 | 13 | 11 | 24 | 32 | — | — | — | — | — |
| 2010–11 | Washington Capitals | NHL | 11 | 4 | 3 | 7 | 8 | 9 | 1 | 5 | 6 | 2 |
| 2011–12 | St. Louis Blues | NHL | 72 | 17 | 17 | 34 | 26 | 7 | 1 | 0 | 1 | 0 |
| NHL totals | | | 1,244 | 417 | 521 | 938 | 1,242 | 122 | 32 | 41 | 73 | 76 |

=== International ===
| Year | Team | Event | Result | GP | G | A | Pts | PIM |
|---|---|---|---|---|---|---|---|---|
| 1994 | Canada | WC | 1st place, gold medalist(s) | 8 | 0 | 6 | 6 | 10 |
| Senior totals | | | | 8 | 0 | 6 | 6 | 10 |

== See also ==
- List of NHL players with 1,000 games played

| Preceded by Joe Hulbig | Edmonton Oilers first round pick 1993 (first of two) | Succeeded by Nick Stajduhar |
| Preceded by Kimmo Timonen | Nashville Predators captain 2007–2010 | Succeeded by Shea Weber |
