= Barry Trotz =

Canadian hockey coach (born 1962)

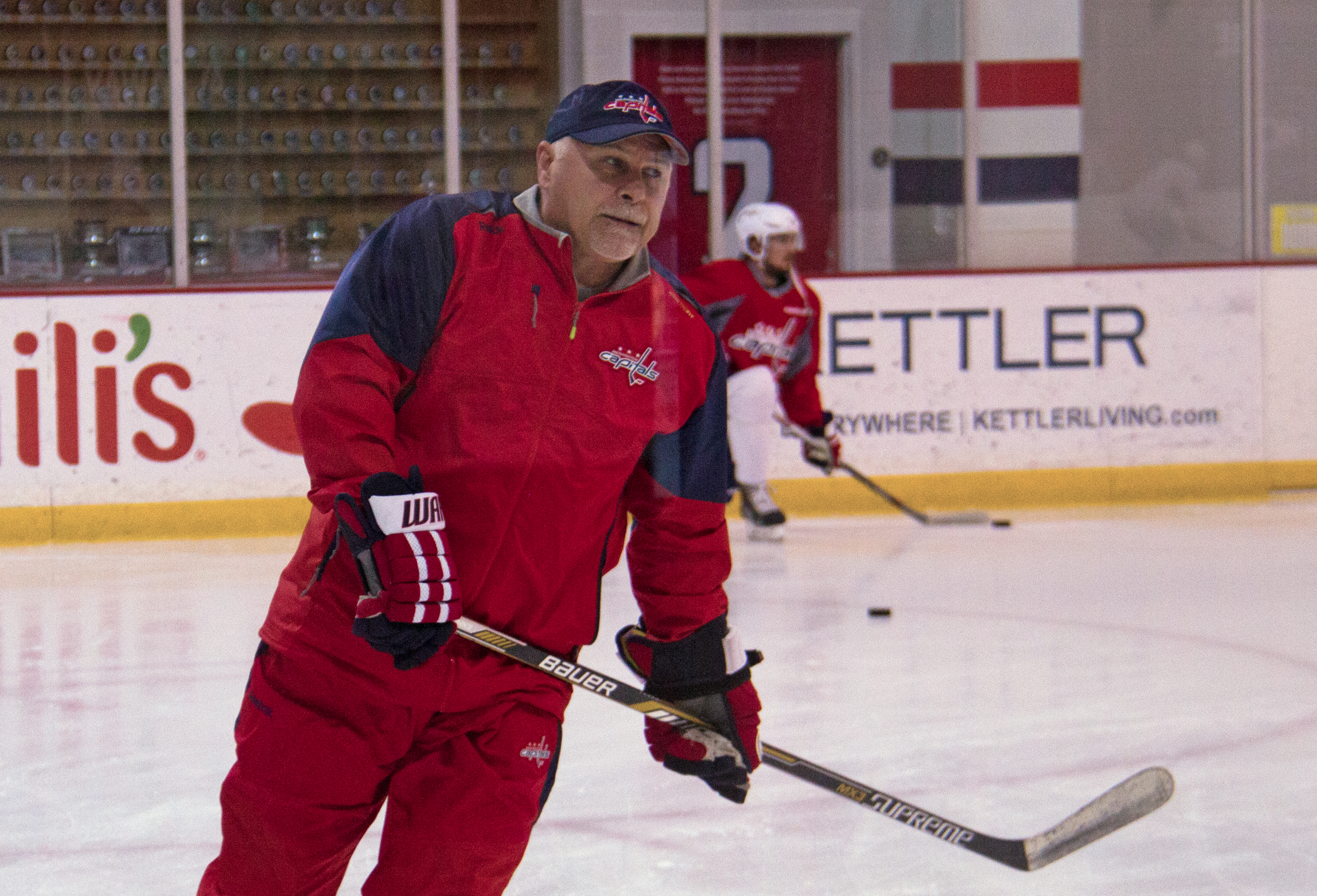
- Trotz with the Washington Capitals in 2015
- Born: July 15, 1962 (age 64) Dauphin, Manitoba, Canada
- Coached for: Nashville Predators; Washington Capitals; New York Islanders
- Coaching career: 1984–2022
Medal record
Representing Canada
Men's ice hockey, assistant coach
World Championship
Gold medal – first place	2003 Finland
Silver medal – second place	2009 Switzerland

Barry Trotz (born July 15, 1962) is a Canadian ice hockey executive, former player and coach who is an advisor for the Nashville Predators of the National Hockey League (NHL). He formerly served as the Predators' general manager. As a coach, Trotz served as head coach of the Predators, Washington Capitals, and New York Islanders. Trotz is known for his defensive-minded coaching style and is ranked fourth all-time in NHL coaching wins, behind only Scotty Bowman, Joel Quenneville and Paul Maurice. He is often referred to by fans and players as "Trotzy".

He was previously the coach of the American Hockey League (AHL)'s Baltimore Skipjacks and Portland Pirates, with whom he won an AHL championship in 1994. That same year, he won the Louis A.R. Pieri Memorial Award, which is awarded to the outstanding coach in the AHL as voted upon by the AHL Broadcasters and Writers. On February 20, 2013, Lindy Ruff was fired by the Buffalo Sabres, making Trotz the longest-tenured head coach in the NHL. He was also the second-longest tenured coach in the four major North American professional leagues, behind only Gregg Popovich of the National Basketball Association's San Antonio Spurs. On April 14, 2014, the Predators announced Trotz would not return for his 16th season as head coach. On May 26, 2014, Trotz was announced as the new head coach of the Capitals. On June 7, 2018, Trotz won his first Stanley Cup as the head coach, with the Capitals defeating the Vegas Golden Knights in five games, for the franchise's first Stanley Cup championship. On June 21, 2018, Trotz was announced as the new head coach of the Islanders. The Islanders let him go at the end of the 2021–22 season, when the team missed the playoffs.

== Coaching career ==
=== Early years ===
Before becoming a coach, Trotz played as a defenceman for the Western Hockey League (WHL)'s Regina Pats from 1979 to 1982, winning the WHL Championship in 1980. During that time, Trotz played in 191 games, scoring 15 goals, adding 60 assists and accumulating 324 penalty minutes. Trotz played his final year of junior hockey in his home town of Dauphin, Manitoba, where the Kings won the Manitoba Junior Hockey League title as well as the Anavet Cup.

Trotz said he realized his playing was not good enough for an NHL career, and started having doubts about his future. He wound up getting a spot attending training camp for the American Hockey League (AHL)'s Hershey Bears in 1982 thanks to Jack Button, director of player recruitment at the Bears' NHL parent club, the Washington Capitals. Button said to Trotz he was invited because Button believed Trotz "might be a good minor league leader or a coach someday". Trotz began his coaching career as an assistant coach at the University of Manitoba in 1984. The following season, he became the general manager and head coach for the Dauphin Kings. In 1987, he returned to the University of Manitoba as head coach, while also serving as a part-time scout for the Washington Capitals.

Trotz became the head coach for the Capitals' minor league affiliate, the Baltimore Skipjacks, in 1992. On March 26, 1993, the franchise moved to Portland, Maine, and was renamed the Portland Pirates. Trotz led the Pirates to two Calder Cup finals, winning the Calder Cup in the Pirates' inaugural season of 1994.

=== Nashville Predators (1998–2014) ===
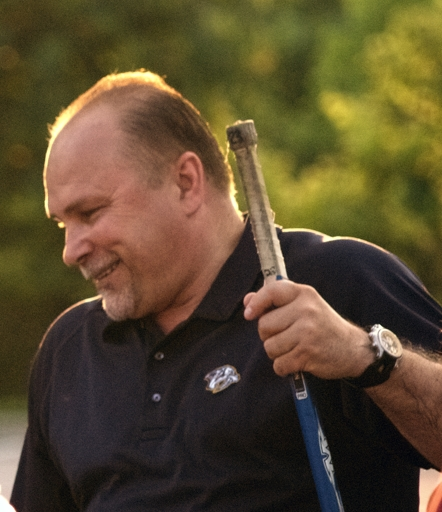
Trotz during his tenure as head coach of the Nashville Predators in 2009.

When longtime Capitals general manager David Poile was hired by the newly established Nashville Predators, he decided to bring Trotz along to become the team's first head coach. He was named the head coach of the Predators on August 6, 1997. Even before the team began play, Trotz was involved in the Predators expansion process, doing player scouting and helping design the team facilities at the Nashville Arena.

In the debut of both Trotz and the Predators at the 1998–99 NHL season, the team won 28 games, the third highest for an expansion team to date. He holds the record for most games coached by the first coach of an NHL expansion franchise, previously held by Terry Crisp for the Tampa Bay Lightning. Coincidentally, Crisp now works as a radio and TV broadcaster for the Predators. In a November 4, 2008, game against the Vancouver Canucks, Trotz became just the tenth head coach in NHL history to coach 750 games with a single team, and the 31st to reach that mark overall.

The 2006–07 season was Trotz's most successful season, leading the Predators to the second-most points in the Western Conference and third overall at 110. However, they trailed their division rival the Detroit Red Wings, therefore denying them the first division championship in club history. The Predators would fare no better in the playoffs, losing 4–1 to the San Jose Sharks in the opening round just as they did the year before. Trotz finished fourth in the Jack Adams Award voting at season's end, but was voted by his peers Sporting News NHL Coach of the Year. He is well respected around the NHL for keeping his team focused. He led the Predators to four consecutive playoff appearances from 2003 to 2008, and reached the playoffs again in 2009–10. Shortly after being eliminated by the Chicago Blackhawks in six games, on April 28, 2010, Trotz was named a finalist for the Jack Adams Award for NHL coach of the year alongside Joe Sacco of the Colorado Avalanche and Dave Tippett of the Phoenix Coyotes.

Trotz earned his 500th win with a 4–1 win over the Detroit Red Wings on March 30, 2012.

On April 14, 2014, the Predators announced Trotz would not return for his 16th season as head coach. The Predators hired Peter Laviolette as Trotz's replacement on May 6, 2014. Trotz's 1,196 regular season games coached puts him 14th on the all-time coaching list, and his tenure with the Predators was the longest unbroken coaching stretch in league history.

=== Washington Capitals (2014–2018) ===
Despite the Predators inviting Trotz to work in their hockey operations department, he wanted to keep coaching. Eventually the Washington Capitals, the same team that gave Trotz his first opportunities in professional hockey, hired him on May 26, 2014.

On February 28, 2017, Trotz recorded his 700th win with a 4–1 victory over the New York Rangers, and became the sixth NHL coach to reach 700 wins.

In the 2018 Stanley Cup playoffs, the Capitals trailed in each of their playoff series matchups, which started by losing the first two games of the first round to Columbus before Washington won the next four, including a victory in Columbus for the deciding game. They faced the defending champion Pittsburgh Penguins in the second round and reached a 2–2 series tie with one win and one loss at home and on the road, before seizing the upper hand with a critical 6–3 victory at home for game five and finally finishing them off 2–1 in overtime at Pittsburgh in game six on a goal by Evgeny Kuznetsov to advance to the conference finals. It was both their first conference finals appearance since 1998 and the first time Trotz had advanced past the second round as a coach. The Capitals faced the Tampa Bay Lightning and won the first two games before three straight losses (two at home) had Washington face elimination. They then won game six and game seven with shutout performances (including winning game seven in Tampa) to overcome a 3–2 series deficit for the first time in franchise history after a game five loss and reach the Stanley Cup Final for the first time since 1998. In the 2018 Cup Final, they met the Vegas Golden Knights, an expansion team that won 51 games. The Capitals lost game one 6–4 in Vegas but rebounded with the efforts of Braden Holtby in preserving a late 3–2 lead to win game two. Trotz and the Capitals rolled to routs in games three and four to set up a potential clinching game five (hosted at Vegas), the first in Capitals' history. On June 7, the Capitals won a tight game five by a score of 4–3, with the final goal scored by Lars Eller, to clinch the Stanley Cup for the Capitals, with this being the first title for Trotz as head coach after 19 seasons, the longest such wait in NHL history. On June 18, 2018, Trotz resigned from the Capitals as their head coach due to a contract dispute.

=== New York Islanders (2018–2022) ===
On June 21, 2018, the New York Islanders hired Trotz as head coach. On March 5, 2019, Trotz earned his 800th career win when the Islanders defeated the Ottawa Senators 5–4 after a shootout In the Stanley Cup playoffs, the Islanders swept the Pittsburgh Penguins in the first round and then were swept by the Carolina Hurricanes in the second round. On June 19, 2019, Trotz won the Jack Adams Award for a second time.

On August 20, 2020, the Islanders defeated Trotz's former team, the Washington Capitals, who he previously coached to a Stanley Cup championship in 2018, 4–1 in the first round of the 2020 Stanley Cup playoffs.

After a win over the New York Rangers on February 8, 2021, Trotz earned his 850th career win as NHL head coach and passed Ken Hitchcock for third place on the all-time coach wins list.

On May 9, 2022, Trotz was relieved from his duties as the Islanders head coach as the Islanders missed the playoffs for the first time since 2018.

=== International ===
Trotz was assistant coach for Canada at the IIHF World Championships three times: 2002, 2003 (when they won the gold medal) and 2009.

== Executive career ==
It was announced that Trotz would replace David Poile as general manager of the Nashville Predators on July 1, 2023. In 2026, during his second season as general manager, Trotz announced his intention to step down following the season, and transition into an advisory role through the end of his contract. He was subsequently succeeded by Chris MacFarland on June 2, 2026.

== Personal life ==
Trotz resides in Nashville, Tennessee, with his wife and one of their four children. The family previously resided in Brentwood, Tennessee; Clarendon, Virginia; and Garden City, New York.

An active member of the Nashville community, Trotz won the Community Spirit Award in 2005 for various charitable works, including donating $500 to My Friends' House (a United Way agency) for each Nashville victory through several seasons; serving as an active board member for the Williamson County YMCA and the United Way; working closely with Best Buddies of Tennessee, a nonprofit organization dedicated to establishing a global volunteer movement that creates opportunities for one-to-one friendships, integrated employment and leadership development for people with intellectual and developmental disabilities.

Trotz was named to the Portland Pirates Hall of Fame in 2005, and to the University of Manitoba Hall of Fame in 2001.

Trotz is of Ukrainian descent.

== Head coaching record ==
=== MJHL ===
Team	Year	W	L	OT/T	Finish	Postseason
Dauphin Kings	1986–87	47	28	19	2nd in North	Lost division finals

=== AHL ===
Team	Year	Regular season							Postseason			
Team	Year	G	W	L	OT	T	Pts	Finish	W	L	Win%	Result
Portland Pirates	1993–94	80	43	27	0	12	96	2nd in North	12	5	.706	Won Calder Cup (MNC)
Portland Pirates	1994–95	80	46	22	0	12	104	2nd in North	3	4	.429	Lost in division semifinals (PRO)
Portland Pirates	1995–96	80	32	34	4	10	78	3rd in North	14	10	.583	Lost in Calder Cup final (RCH)
Portland Pirates	1996–97	80	37	26	7	10	91	3rd in New England	2	3	.400	Lost in division semifinals (SPR)

=== NHL ===
Team	Year	Regular season							Postseason			
Team	Year	G	W	L	T	OTL	Pts	Finish	W	L	Win%	Result
NSH	1998–99	82	28	47	7	—	63	5th in Central	—	—	—	Missed playoffs
NSH	1999–00	82	28	40	7	7	70	5th in Central	—	—	—	Missed playoffs
NSH	2000–01	82	34	36	9	3	80	3rd in Central	—	—	—	Missed playoffs
NSH	2001–02	82	28	41	13	0	69	4th in Central	—	—	—	Missed playoffs
NSH	2002–03	82	27	35	13	7	74	4th in Central	—	—	—	Missed playoffs
NSH	2003–04	82	38	29	11	4	91	3rd in Central	2	4	.333	Lost in conference quarterfinals (DET)
NSH	2005–06	82	49	25	—	8	106	2nd in Central	1	4	.200	Lost in conference quarterfinals (SJS)
NSH	2006–07	82	51	23	—	8	110	2nd in Central	1	4	.200	Lost in conference quarterfinals (SJS)
NSH	2007–08	82	41	32	—	9	91	2nd in Central	2	4	.333	Lost in conference quarterfinals (DET)
NSH	2008–09	82	40	34	—	8	88	5th in Central	—	—	—	Missed playoffs
NSH	2009–10	82	47	29	—	6	100	3rd in Central	2	4	.333	Lost in conference quarterfinals (CHI)
NSH	2010–11	82	44	27	—	11	99	2nd in Central	6	6	.500	Lost in conference semifinals (VAN)
NSH	2011–12	82	48	26	—	8	104	2nd in Central	5	5	.500	Lost in conference semifinals (PHX)
NSH	2012–13	48	16	23	—	9	41	5th in Central	—	—	—	Missed playoffs
NSH	2013–14	82	38	32	—	12	88	6th in Central	—	—	—	Missed playoffs
NSH total		1,196	557	479	60	100			19	31	.380	7 playoff appearances
WSH	2014–15	82	45	26	—	11	101	2nd in Metropolitan	7	7	.500	Lost in second round (NYR)
WSH	2015–16	82	56	18	—	8	120	1st in Metropolitan	6	6	.500	Lost in second round (PIT)
WSH	2016–17	82	55	19	—	8	118	1st in Metropolitan	7	6	.538	Lost in second round (PIT)
WSH	2017–18	82	49	26	—	7	105	1st in Metropolitan	16	8	.667	Won Stanley Cup (VGK)
WSH total		328	205	89	—	34			36	27	.571	4 playoff appearances 1 Stanley Cup
NYI	2018–19	82	48	27	—	7	103	2nd in Metropolitan	4	4	.500	Lost in second round (CAR)
NYI	2019–20	68	35	23	—	10	80	5th in Metropolitan	13	9	.591	Lost in conference finals (TBL)
NYI	2020–21	56	32	17	—	7	71	4th in East	11	8	.579	Lost in conference finals (TBL)
NYI	2021–22	82	37	35	—	10	84	5th in Metropolitan	—	—	—	Missed playoffs
NYI total		288	152	102	—	34			28	21	.571	3 playoff appearances
Total		1,812	914	670	60	168			83	79	.512	14 playoff appearances 1 Stanley Cup

Sporting positions
Preceded by Position created	Head coach of the Nashville Predators; 1998–2014	Succeeded by Peter Laviolette
Preceded by Adam Oates	Head coach of the Washington Capitals; 2014–2018	Succeeded by Todd Reirden
Preceded by Doug Weight	Head coach of the New York Islanders; 2018–2022	Succeeded by Lane Lambert
Preceded by David Poile	General manager of the Nashville Predators; 2023–2026	Succeeded by Chris MacFarland
Awards and achievements
Preceded by Bob Hartley; Gerard Gallant	Jack Adams Award; 2016; 2019	Succeeded by John Tortorella; Bruce Cassidy
