= 2022 National Hockey League All-Star Game =

Professional ice hockey exhibition game

2022 NHL All-Star Game

T-Mobile Arena, Paradise
- February 5, 2022
- Game one: Metropolitan 6 – Pacific 4
- Game two: Central 7 – Atlantic 5
- Game three: Metropolitan 5 – Central 3
- MVP: Claude Giroux (Metropolitan)

The 2022 National Hockey League All-Star Game was held on February 5, 2022, at T-Mobile Arena in Paradise, the home of the Vegas Golden Knights. For the sixth consecutive All-Star Game, a three-on-three format was used, with teams representing each of the league's four divisions competing in a single-elimination tournament.

== History ==
The NHL originally awarded Sunrise, the 2021 All-Star Game on January 24, 2020. The city previously hosted the NHL All-Star Game in 2003. During their State of the League press conference on January 24, 2020, NHL commissioner Gary Bettman and deputy commissioner Bill Daly stated that the league was considering changing the All-Star Game format so it has a "distinct international flavor," using a model similar to the World Cup of Hockey. The four-team, 3-on-3, single elimination format, with one team representing each of the league's four divisions, had been used for the past five All-Star Games.

On October 22, 2020, the NHL officially announced that both the Winter Classic in Minnesota and the All-Star Game had been postponed for the 2020–21 season due to the COVID-19 pandemic and "uncertainty as to when we will be able to welcome our fans back to our games," as fan participation and accompanying events are considered "integral to the[ir] success". The NHL stated that both events will not return until 2022 at the earliest, and that these events could be held in Minneapolis and Sunrise "in the near future" (but not yet naming them the 2022 hosts). Sunrise was later instead awarded the 2023 All-Star Game, replacing the scheduled game for 2021.

The collective bargaining agreement (CBA) that the league and the National Hockey League Players' Association (NHLPA) signed on July 10, 2020, included a provision opening the possibility for the NHL to explore participation at the 2022 and 2026 Winter Olympics. During seasons when the league goes to the Olympics (most recently in 2014), the All-Star Game is not normally held.

On June 28, 2021, the league announced that the All-Star Game will take place instead at T-Mobile Arena in Paradise, home of the Vegas Golden Knights, for the first time. The league cited the fact that they had not yet signed a deal with the International Olympic Committee on sending players to the 2022 Beijing Olympics, so they decided to go ahead and schedule an All-Star Game anyway, at an arena on the West Coast since players will be scheduled to fly straight to Beijing after the game. On September 3, 2021, a deal was officially reached to send players to the Olympics, with an opt-out clause should COVID-19 health conditions worsen. However, on December 22, 2021, the NHL announced that it will no longer send its players to the Olympics due to rising COVID-19 cases and increasing number of postponed games. Consequently, the originally scheduled Olympic break following the All-Star Game from February 7 to 22 will now be utilized to reschedule 95 postponed games.

== Skills Competition ==
The NHL All-Star Skills Competition was held on the night before on February 4. The Fastest Skater, Save Streak, Accuracy Shooting, and Hardest Shot events returned from 2020; and the Breakaway Challenge from 2016. The breakaway challenge featured Wyatt Russell and Manon Rhéaume as celebrity goaltenders.

The winners of these five regular skills events were:

- Fastest Skater: Jordan Kyrou, St. Louis Blues (13.550 seconds)
- Save Streak: Jack Campbell, Toronto Maple Leafs and Andrei Vasilevskiy, Tampa Bay Lightning (9 saves)
- Hardest Shot: Victor Hedman, Tampa Bay Lightning (103.2 mph)
- Breakaway Challenge: Alex Pietrangelo, Vegas Golden Knights (64 points)
- Accuracy Shooting: Sebastian Aho, Carolina Hurricanes (10.937 seconds)

=== Special Skills Challenges ===
The Skills Competition also featured two events specific to Las Vegas locations:

- The Fountain Face-off was held outside at the Fountains of Bellagio directly on the water. The event consisted of a bracket-style tournament where players stand on a floating ice circle, with each player trying to land pucks on five floating targets. They could land them in any order they chose; however, a puck that ended up in the pond did not count. The two players who hit four out of five targets in the fastest time, moved onto a head-to-head final where they have to hit all five targets in order to be crowned the champion. Former Team USA women's player Jocelyne Lamoureux also participated, finishing in third. The finals saw Nashville Predators defenseman Roman Josi competing against Columbus Blue Jackets defenseman Zach Werenski, with Werenski hitting all five targets in 25.634 seconds to secure the victory.
- The NHL 21 In '22 was held on the Las Vegas Strip and consisted of a full deck of over-sized cards standing 35 feet away. A player took two shots and for every card they knocked down with the puck, they get the card's point value. If a player got blackjack, they automatically won. If more than one player did that, they shot again, with the highest card being declared the winner. If nobody got blackjack, each all-star played their own hand. The closest player to 21 without going over, won the event. The tie-breaker would then be settled with a single shot where the highest card will determine the "card shark". The winner was Dallas Stars forward Joe Pavelski with the queen of clubs over Tampa Bay Lightning forward Steven Stamkos' four of clubs.

== Rosters ==
Captaincy of each division was determined by a fan vote, which ran from December 11, 2021, to January 8, 2022. The league announced the four captains and most of the rest of the rosters on January 13. The final results of the captaincy vote were: Washington Capitals forward Alex Ovechkin (Metropolitan), Toronto Maple Leafs forward Auston Matthews (Atlantic), Colorado Avalanche forward Nathan MacKinnon (Central), and Edmonton Oilers forward Connor McDavid (Pacific). However, MacKinnon did not play due to injury; as a result, Dallas Stars forward Joe Pavelski was named as Central captain and Nashville Predators defenseman Roman Josi replaced MacKinnon on the roster. Ovechkin then had to drop out after being placed in COVID protocols; Philadelphia Flyers forward Claude Giroux was then named Metropolitan captain, with Capitals forward Tom Wilson added to the roster.

An additional 11th "Last Men In" player for each division was also determined by a fan vote, running from January 13 to January 17. The final results of the "Last Men In" of each division were: New York Rangers forward Mika Zibanejad (Metropolitan), Tampa Bay Lightning forward Steven Stamkos (Atlantic), Colorado Avalanche forward Nazem Kadri (Central), and Anaheim Ducks forward Troy Terry (Pacific). However, Pittsburgh Penguins forward Jake Guentzel, who finished second in voting in the Metropolitan Division, replaced Zibanejad, who did not attend for personal reasons.

On January 11, the head coaches were announced, chosen from the team in each division with the highest points percentage through January 10: Rod Brind'Amour of the Carolina Hurricanes (Metropolitan), Andrew Brunette of the Florida Panthers (Atlantic), Jared Bednar of the Colorado Avalanche (Central), and Peter DeBoer of the Vegas Golden Knights (Pacific).

=== Eastern Conference ===
Atlantic Division
Head coach: (Canada) Andrew Brunette, Florida Panthers
Nat.	Player	Team	Pos.	#
(United States)	Auston Matthews (C)	Toronto Maple Leafs	F	34
(United States)	Brady Tkachuk*	Ottawa Senators	F	7
(Canada)	Patrice Bergeron	Boston Bruins	F	37
(Canada)	Jonathan Huberdeau	Florida Panthers	F	11
(United States)	Dylan Larkin	Detroit Red Wings	F	71
(Canada)	Nick Suzuki	Montreal Canadiens	F	14
(Canada)	Steven Stamkos~	Tampa Bay Lightning	F	91
(Sweden)	Rasmus Dahlin	Buffalo Sabres	D	26
(Sweden)	Victor Hedman	Tampa Bay Lightning	D	77
(United States)	Jack Campbell	Toronto Maple Leafs	G	36
(Russia)	Andrei Vasilevskiy	Tampa Bay Lightning	G	88

- ^{~} Voted "Last Man In".
- ^{*} Replaced Drake Batherson (Ottawa Senators) due to injury.

Metropolitan Division
Head coach: (Canada) Rod Brind'Amour, Carolina Hurricanes
Nat.	Player	Team	Pos.	#
(Canada)	Claude Giroux (C)^{†}	Philadelphia Flyers	F	28
(Finland)	Sebastian Aho	Carolina Hurricanes	F	20
(Canada)	Tom Wilson^{†}	Washington Capitals	F	43
(United States)	Jake Guentzel*	Pittsburgh Penguins	F	59
(United States)	Jack Hughes	New Jersey Devils	F	86
(United States)	Chris Kreider	New York Rangers	F	20
(Russia)	Evgeny Kuznetsov#	Washington Capitals	F	92
(Canada)	Adam Pelech	New York Islanders	D	3
(United States)	Zach Werenski	Columbus Blue Jackets	D	8
(Denmark)	Frederik Andersen	Carolina Hurricanes	G	31
(Canada)	Tristan Jarry	Pittsburgh Penguins	G	35

- ^{†} Alexander Ovechkin (Washington Capitals), the original winner of the captaincy vote, did not play due to COVID protocols. Giroux was then named as the new captain and Wilson as the replacement player.
- ^{*} Replaced Mika Zibanejad (New York Rangers), the original Metropolitan "Last Man In" winner, for personal reasons.
- ^{#} Replaced Adam Fox (New York Rangers) due to injury.

=== Western Conference ===
Central Division
Head coach: (Canada) Jared Bednar, Colorado Avalanche
Nat.	Player	Team	Pos.	#
(United States)	Joe Pavelski (C)†	Dallas Stars	F	16
(United States)	Kyle Connor	Winnipeg Jets	F	81
(United States)	Alex DeBrincat	Chicago Blackhawks	F	12
(Russia)	Kirill Kaprizov	Minnesota Wild	F	97
(United States)	Clayton Keller	Arizona Coyotes	F	9
(Canada)	Nazem Kadri~	Colorado Avalanche	F	91
(Canada)	Jordan Kyrou	St. Louis Blues	F	25
(Canada)	Cale Makar	Colorado Avalanche	D	8
(Switzerland)	Roman Josi†	Nashville Predators	D	59
(Finland)	Juuse Saros	Nashville Predators	G	74
(Canada)	Cam Talbot	Minnesota Wild	G	33

- ^{~} Voted "Last Man In".
- ^{†} Nathan MacKinnon (Colorado Avalanche), the original winner of the captaincy vote, did not play due to injury. Pavelski was then named as the new captain and Josi as the replacement player.

Pacific Division
Head coach: (Canada) Peter DeBoer, Vegas Golden Knights
Nat.	Player	Team	Pos.	#
(Canada)	Connor McDavid (C)	Edmonton Oilers	F	97
(Germany)	Leon Draisaitl	Edmonton Oilers	F	29
(Canada)	Jordan Eberle	Seattle Kraken	F	7
(United States)	Johnny Gaudreau	Calgary Flames	F	13
(Sweden)	Adrian Kempe	Los Angeles Kings	F	9
(Switzerland)	Timo Meier	San Jose Sharks	F	28
(Canada)	Mark Stone	Vegas Golden Knights	F	61
(Canada)	Jonathan Marchessault*	Vegas Golden Knights	F	81
(United States)	Troy Terry~	Anaheim Ducks	F	19
(Canada)	Alex Pietrangelo	Vegas Golden Knights	D	7
(United States)	Thatcher Demko	Vancouver Canucks	G	35
(United States)	John Gibson	Anaheim Ducks	G	36

- ^{~} Voted "Last Man In".
- * Added to the roster on February 2, 2022, by the NHL

== Bracket ==
Instead of the conference-based semifinals used in the previous all-star games, the matchups were randomly determined at the Skills Competition with Vegas Golden Knights forward Jonathan Marchessault drawing the Pacific Division's opponent from a set of cards representing the other three divisions during a magic trick. Marchessault drew the Metropolitan Division card.

Semifinals		Final
Atlantic Division	5
Central Division	8	Central Division	3
Metropolitan Division	6	Metropolitan Division	5
Pacific Division	4

== Game summaries ==
Each game was played in abbreviated format, consisting of two 10-minute periods of 3-on-3 play. The players of the winning divisional all-star team split a $1 million prize and Claude Giroux received a Honda Passport for being named MVP.

=== First semifinal game ===
February 5, 2022	Metropolitan	6–4	Pacific	T-Mobile Arena	Recap
00:13 – Tom Wilson (1); 03:08 – Claude Giroux (1); 03:20 – Sebastian Aho (1)		First period	Timo Meier (1) – 02:26
06:16 – Jack Hughes (1); 07:40 – Jake Guentzel (1); 08:51 – en – Jack Hughes (2)		Second period	Jonathan Marchessault (1) – 02:26; Jordan Eberle (1) – 04:27; Mark Stone (1) – 09:38
No period		Third period	No period
Frederik Andersen 6 saves / 7 shots Tristan Jarry 5 saves / 8 shots		Goalie stats	Thatcher Demko 10 saves / 12 shots John Gibson 10 saves / 13 shots

=== Second semifinal game ===
February 5, 2022	Atlantic	5–8	Central	T-Mobile Arena	Recap
03:28 – Jonathan Huberdeau (1); 09:19 – Auston Matthews (1)		First period	Jordan Kyrou (1) – 02:20; Alex DeBrincat (1) – 05:25; Nazem Kadri (1) – 05:56
03:28 – Patrice Bergeron (1); 06:48 – Rasmus Dahlin (1); 07:33 – Steven Stamkos (1)		Second period	Kyle Connor (1) – 03:00; Jordan Kyrou (2) – 06:36; Steven Stamkos (1) – 07:33; Alex DeBrincat (2) – 08:07; Joe Pavelski (1) – en – 09:53
No period		Third period	No period
Jack Campbell 6 saves / 10 shots Andrei Vasilevskiy 9 saves / 12 shots		Goalie stats	Cam Talbot 7 saves / 9 shots Juuse Saros 6 saves / 9 shots

=== Final ===
February 5, 2022	Central	3 – 5	Metropolitan	T-Mobile Arena	Recap
Clayton Keller (1) – 01:38; Nazem Kadri (2) – 05:27		First period	00:27– Evgeny Kuznetsov (1); 03:33 – Claude Giroux 2); 04:50 – Chris Kreider (1); 07:55 – Jack Hughes (3)
Joe Pavelski (2) – 01:19		Second period	02:42 – Claude Giroux (3)
No period		Third period	No period
Cam Talbot 9 saves / 13 shots Juuse Saros 4 saves / 5 shots		Goalie stats	Frederik Andersen 7 saves / 9 shots Tristan Jarry 14 saves / 15 shots

== Uniforms ==
The All-Star uniforms were unveiled on January 13. For the first time since the 2018 All-Star Game, the NHL shield is featured on the front. Each player's respective team logo is on the left shoulder and the All-Star Game logo is on the right. There is one white and one navy blue jersey, both feature a chevron at the waist in a contrasting color with two stripes separating this feature from the base (white has dark red with black trim and navy blue has light blue with white stripes). The NHL shields are also trimmed in these colors, while the shield is in the usual black with silver elements. The stripes pattern is repeated on each sleeve with two stars; four in total per jersey (one for each division). These stars are dark red with red trim on the white jersey, royal blue with light blue trim on the navy blue jersey.

== Festivities and entertainment ==
The NHL Fan Fair, featuring various fan activities during All-Star Weekend, was held between February 3 and February 6 at the Las Vegas Convention Center.

The NHL announced on January 28 that American singer Machine Gun Kelly would perform at the All-Star Game, with his performance taking place during the second intermission. Canadian pop singer Faouzia sang the Canadian national anthem while country singer Blanco Brown sang the American national anthem.

== Television ==
The All-Star Game and Skills Competition was broadcast in the United States by ABC and ESPN, respectively, for the first time since 2004. The All-Star Game was also streamed in the U.S. on ESPN+. In Canada, both the All-Star Game and Skills Competition were broadcast in English on Sportsnet and on TVA Sports in French. The All-Star Game was also streamed in Canada on Sportsnet Now. CBC did not join Sportsnet in simulcasting either event this year due to its coverage of the 2022 Winter Olympics.
