= List of Wilkes-Barre/Scranton Penguins head coaches =

This is a list of Wilkes-Barre/Scranton Penguins head coaches. There have been 10 head coaches of the Penguins franchise since its founding in 1999. Glenn Patrick, the brother of former-Pittsburgh Penguins general manager and coach Craig Patrick, served as the team's first head coach. Today the WBS Penguins are led by Clark Donatelli, who replaced Mike Sullivan after he was promoted to the Pittsburgh Penguins. Sullivan replaced John Hynes, who was hired by the New Jersey Devils in 2015. Before Hynes was Dan Bylsma, who replaced Todd Richards in June 2008, when Richards took an assistant coaching position with the San Jose Sharks. Patrick, Therrien, Richards, and Hynes led the WBS Pens to AHL Eastern Conference Championship titles.

== Key ==
#	Number of coaches
GC	Games Coached
W	Wins
L	Loses
T	Ties
W – L %	Win – Loss percentage
*	Became (or was a) Pittsburgh Penguins Head Coach
+	Served as a midseason replacement

== Coaches ==
#	Name	Term	Games	Record (W-L-T)	W – L %	Achievements
1	Glenn Patrick	1999–2003	320	115–152–15	.221	AHL Eastern Conference Champions (2001)
2	Michel Therrien*	2003–2005	185	94–56–52	.750	AHL Eastern Conference Champions (2004)
3	Rick Kehoe*+	2005	3	2-1–0	.667	
4	Joe Mullen+	2005–2006	52	28-16-3	.767	
5	Todd Richards	2006–2008	160	98–49–13	.825	AHL Eastern Conference Champions (2008)
6	Dan Bylsma*	2008–2009	54	35-16-1	.676	
7	Todd Reirden+	2009–2010	106	55-43-2	.570	
8	John Hynes	2010–2015	384	231-126-27	.637	AHL Eastern Conference Champions (2010)
9	Mike Sullivan*	2015	23	18-5-0	.783	
10	Clark Donatelli+	2015–	49	22-22-5	.500	
