= Dan Muse =

American ice hockey coach (born 1982)

- Born: July 21, 1982 (age 44) Canton, Massachusetts, U.S.
- Current NHL coach: Pittsburgh Penguins
- Coaching career: 2005–present

Dan Muse (born July 21, 1982) is an American professional ice hockey coach who is the head coach of the Pittsburgh Penguins of the National Hockey League (NHL).

Following four years playing college ice hockey, Muse began coaching at the high school and college levels, winning an National Collegiate Athletic Association (NCAA) national championship as an assistant coach at Yale in 2013. Muse subsequently won a Clark Cup championship with the Chicago Steel of the United States Hockey League (USHL) in 2017, his first head coaching job, before spending three seasons as an assistant with the NHL's Nashville Predators. He then spent three further seasons in various head coaching roles with the USA Hockey National Team Development Program (NTDP), winning a gold medal at the 2023 World U18 Championships, before returning to the NHL as a New York Rangers assistant in 2023. Ahead of the 2025–26 NHL season, Muse was named head coach of the Penguins.

== Early life and education ==
Muse was born in Canton, Massachusetts, on July 21, 1982. Muse played ice hockey from a young age, despite limited opportunities during part of his childhood living on a farm in northern California; following his family's move to Alabama, Muse was partly mentored at a Birmingham Bulls youth camp by minor-league defenseman Paul Marshall. Muse's family also spent time in Chicago and Worcester, Massachusetts, before moving to Canton when Muse was in eighth grade. After playing high school ice hockey at Vermont Academy, Muse subsequently attended Stonehill College, playing four years at National Collegiate Athletic Association (NCAA) Division III level for the Chieftains/Skyhawks under head coach Scott Harlow and serving as an alternate captain his senior year. Following his time at Stonehill, Muse nearly attended law school, and briefly taught history at Archbishop Williams High School in Braintree, Massachusetts.

== Coaching career ==
=== College and juniors ===
During his time as a teacher at Archbishop Williams, Muse also served as an assistant coach for Milton Academy's ice hockey team in nearby Milton. He subsequently left his teaching career to coach full-time, spending the 2007–08 season working as an assistant coach at Division III Williams College under Bill Kangas, before jumping to NCAA Division I with Sacred Heart of the Atlantic Hockey conference for the 2008–09 season. One year later, Muse was hired as an assistant coach under Keith Allain for the Yale Bulldogs of the ECAC Hockey conference. In six seasons with Yale, Muse helped the team to four NCAA tournament appearances, a conference championship in 2011, and the program's first national championship in 2013. In his final season, Muse was promoted to associate head coach.

Following the 2014–15 season, Muse departed the Bulldogs to take his first head coaching job with the Chicago Steel of the junior-level United States Hockey League (USHL). In the 2016–17 season, Muse led the Steel to the best record in the Eastern Conference, with the team ultimately winning their first Clark Cup championship.

=== Nashville Predators ===
Following the Steel's Clark Cup championship, Muse was hired by the Nashville Predators of the National Hockey League (NHL) as an assistant coach under Peter Laviolette. In three seasons with Nashville, Muse primarily ran the team's penalty kill, helping the Predators to a Presidents' Trophy regular season title in 2017–18. After Laviolette's mid-season firing during the Predators' 2019–20 campaign, Muse's contract was not renewed by the Predators following their elimination from the 2020 Stanley Cup playoffs.

=== USA Hockey National Team Development Program ===
Shortly after his departure from Nashville, Muse joined the USA Hockey National Team Development Program (NTDP) as a coach. Muse initially served as head coach of the under-18 team during the 2020–21 USHL season and 2021 World U18 Championships, before switching to the under-17 team for the 2021–22 season. Upon his return to the under-18 team for the 2022–23 season, Muse led the team to an NTDP record-setting 16 wins over NCAA opponents, with 15 over Division I opponents. Muse was praised for his time with the NTDP by NHL entry draft prospects including Ryan Leonard, Oliver Moore, and Will Smith, and coached multiple other future NHL players, including Logan Cooley and Rutger McGroarty.

=== New York Rangers ===
Ahead of the 2023–24 season, Muse rejoined Peter Laviolette as an assistant coach with the New York Rangers. Once again coaching the penalty kill, Muse helped the Rangers to the Presidents' Trophy in his first season, though Laviolette was again fired following the 2024–25 season. Despite this, Muse was reportedly offered the opportunity to interview with the new Rangers coaching staff.

=== Pittsburgh Penguins ===
On June 4, 2025, Muse was named head coach of the NHL's Pittsburgh Penguins, succeeding Mike Sullivan as the 23rd head coach in franchise history. The Penguins had missed the playoffs for the preceding three seasons, and expectations for the team in the 2025–26 season were generally considered modest. Muse's team significantly overperformed preseason predictions, finishing second in the Metropolitan Division with a 41–25–16 record, and scoring the third-most goals in the league. In recognition of his achievements, Muse was a finalist for the Jack Adams Award, given to the NHL's best coach. The Penguins qualified to the 2026 Stanley Cup playoffs, their first postseason berth in four years, but lost to the Philadelphia Flyers in the first round.

=== International ===
Muse's first work with USA Hockey came at the 2013 World Junior Championships with the United States men's junior team, where he served as video coach; after the U.S. won the gold medal, he subsequently reprised the role for the 2014 tournament. Later, as part of his responsibilities with the NTDP, Muse coached the U.S. teams at the 2021 and 2023 World U18 Championships, winning a gold medal in the latter. Muse spent the 2021–22 season coaching the under-17 national team.

== Personal life ==
As of 2020, Muse resided in Nashville, Tennessee, with his wife and their four children.

== Head coaching record ==
Team	Year	Regular season							Postseason		
Team	Year	G	W	L	OTL	Pts	Finish	W	L	Win%	Result
PIT	2025–26	82	41	25	16	98	2nd in Metropolitan	2	4	.333	Lost in first round (PHI)
NHL total		82	41	25	16			2	4	.333	1 playoff appearance

== Awards and honors ==
Award	Year	Ref
NCAA Division I – ECAC Hockey
Conference champion (as assistant coach)	2011	
National champion (as assistant coach)	2013	
USHL
Clark Cup champion	2017	
International
World Junior Championship gold medal (as video coach)	2013	
World U18 Championship gold medal	2023	

Sporting positions
Preceded by Mike Sullivan	Head coach of the Pittsburgh Penguins; 2025–present	Incumbent
