= Pierre Creamer =

Canadian former ice hockey coach

Pierre Creamer (born July 6, 1944) is a Canadian former ice hockey coach. He was head coach of the Pittsburgh Penguins during the 1987–88 NHL season.

Creamer was born in Chomedey, Quebec. He is the brother-in-law of former NHL star Mike Bossy.

Creamer previously coached the Sherbrooke Canadiens, the American Hockey League affiliate of the Montreal Canadiens. He led the team to a Calder Cup championship in his first year behind the bench and ended his three-year tenure with a 120-104-4 record. Creamer had also held a job as coach of the Verdun Juniors of the QMJHL.

Despite coaching a Mario Lemieux-led team that finished fourth in goals scored, Creamer's 1987-88 Penguins struggled defensively and finished last in the Patrick Division. He was relieved of his position at season's end due to cited communication issues with the players as a result of language barrier since most players on the team doesn't speak French; Creamer is currently the only "one year wonder" coach in NHL history to have a winning record.

== Coaching record ==
Team	Year	Regular Season						Post Season
Team	Year	G	W	L	T	Pts	Finish	Result
Pittsburgh Penguins	1987–88	80	36	35	9	81	6th in Patrick	missed playoffs

Preceded by Bob Berry	Head coach of the Pittsburgh Penguins; 1987–88	Succeeded by Gene Ubriaco
