= Lane Lambert =

Canadian ice hockey player (born 1964)

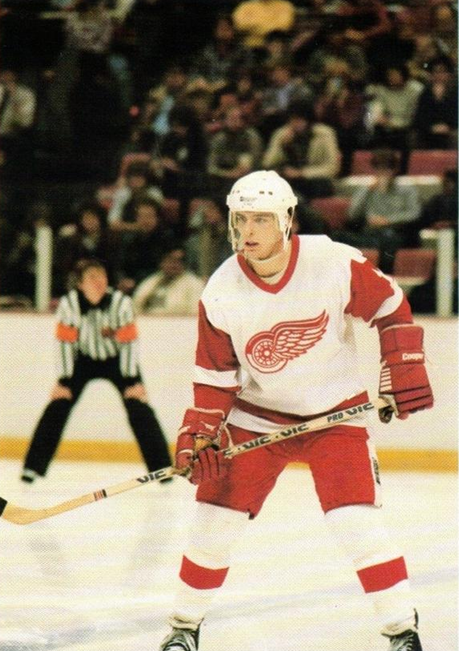
- Lambert in 1984
- Born: November 18, 1964 (age 61) Melfort, Saskatchewan, Canada
- Height: 6 ft 0 in (183 cm)
- Weight: 185 lb (84 kg; 13 st 3 lb)
- Position: Forward
- Shot: Right
- Played for: Detroit Red Wings; New York Rangers; Quebec Nordiques; Düsseldorfer EG; HC Ajoie
- Current NHL coach: Seattle Kraken
- Coached for: New York Islanders
- NHL draft: 25th overall, 1983; Detroit Red Wings
- Playing career: 1983–2001
- Coaching career: 2002–present

Lane Douglas Lambert (born November 18, 1964) is a Canadian professional ice hockey coach and former player who is the head coach for the Seattle Kraken of the National Hockey League (NHL). Drafted 25th overall in the second round of the 1983 NHL entry draft, Lambert played 283 games in the NHL for the Quebec Nordiques, New York Rangers, and Detroit Red Wings between 1983 and 1989.

== Coaching career ==
Lambert was hired as the head coach of the Milwaukee Admirals of the American Hockey League (AHL) in July 2007, a position he held until he was promoted as an assistant coach for the Nashville Predators on June 9, 2011. He was also an assistant coach with the Washington Capitals during their 2018 Stanley Cup run, however he signed with the New York Islanders after head coach Barry Trotz signed with the team in 2018.

After Trotz's firing following the 2021–22 season, on May 16, 2022, Lambert was promoted to head coach of the Islanders. The Islanders fired Lambert on January 20, 2024, after the team started the 2023–24 season with a 19–15–11 record and were out of playoff contention at that time.

On June 5, 2024, the Toronto Maple Leafs announced that Lambert had been hired as an associate coach.

On May 29, 2025, the Seattle Kraken named Lambert the third head coach in the franchise's history.

== Personal life ==
Lambert was born in Melfort, Saskatchewan. His wife Andi died on September 16, 2015, from breast cancer. They had one daughter together and Lambert has another daughter from a previous marriage.

Lambert has two brothers, Dale and Ross, who also played ice hockey. His nephew Jimmy played for the University of Michigan, while his other nephew, Brad, was selected 30th overall by the Winnipeg Jets in the 2022 NHL entry draft.

== Awards ==
- WHL Second All-Star Team – 1983

== Career statistics ==
=== Regular season and playoffs ===
			Regular season					Playoffs
Season	Team	League	GP	G	A	Pts	PIM	GP	G	A	Pts	PIM
1980–81	Swift Current Broncos	SJHL	55	43	54	97	63	—	—	—	—	—
1981–82	Saskatoon Blades	WHL	72	45	69	114	111	5	1	1	2	25
1982–83	Saskatoon Blades	WHL	64	59	60	119	126	6	4	3	7	7
1983–84	Detroit Red Wings	NHL	73	20	15	35	115	4	0	0	0	10
1984–85	Detroit Red Wings	NHL	69	14	11	25	104	—	—	—	—	—
1985–86	Detroit Red Wings	NHL	34	2	3	5	130	—	—	—	—	—
1985–86	Adirondack Red Wings	AHL	45	16	25	41	69	16	5	5	10	9
1986–87	New York Rangers	NHL	18	2	2	4	33	—	—	—	—	—
1986–87	New Haven Nighthawks	AHL	11	3	3	6	19	—	—	—	—	—
1986–87	Quebec Nordiques	NHL	15	5	5	10	18	13	2	4	6	30
1987–88	Quebec Nordiques	NHL	61	13	28	41	98	—	—	—	—	—
1988–89	Quebec Nordiques	NHL	13	2	2	4	23	—	—	—	—	—
1988–89	Halifax Citadels	AHL	59	25	35	60	162	4	0	2	2	2
1989–90	Düsseldorfer EG	GER	6	2	6	8	4	—	—	—	—	—
1989–90	Canadian national team	Intl	54	28	36	64	48	—	—	—	—	—
1990–91	HC Ajoie	NLB	36	40	45	85	82	10	11	7	18	30
1990–91	Canadian national team	Intl	4	1	0	1	0	—	—	—	—	—
1991–92	HC Ajoie	NLB	35	51	38	89	125	9	10	5	15	14
1992–93	HC Ajoie	NLA	25	22	16	38	28	—	—	—	—	—
1993–94	HC La Chaux-de-Fonds	NLB	36	39	29	68	62	5	5	2	7	8
1994–95	SC Langnau	NLB	36	37	44	81	60	7	5	4	9	33
1995–96	SC Langnau	NLB	33	39	40	79	64	8	7	4	11	14
1996–97	Cleveland Lumberjacks	IHL	75	24	20	44	94	13	4	5	9	21
1997–98	Cleveland Lumberjacks	IHL	39	4	10	14	60	3	0	0	0	0
1998–99	Cleveland Lumberjacks	IHL	36	8	10	18	61	—	—	—	—	—
1998–99	Houston Aeros	IHL	9	2	1	3	4	19	4	1	5	26
1999–00	Houston Aeros	IHL	77	21	9	30	88	7	2	1	3	10
2000–01	Houston Aeros	IHL	66	10	12	22	70	7	0	1	1	11
NHL totals			283	58	66	124	521	17	2	4	6	40

== Head coaching record ==
Team	Year	Regular season						Postseason			
Team	Year	G	W	L	OTL	Pts	Finish	W	L	Win %	Result
NYI	2022–23	82	42	31	9	93	4th in Metropolitan	2	4	.333	Lost in first round (CAR)
NYI	2023–24	45	19	15	11	49	(fired)	—	—	—	—
NYI total		127	61	46	20			2	4	.333	1 playoff appearance
SEA	2025–26	82	34	37	11	79	6th in Pacific	—	—	—	Missed playoffs
SEA total		82	34	37	11			—	—	—	
Total		209	95	83	31			2	4	.333	1 playoff appearance

Sporting positions
Preceded by Barry Trotz	Head coach of the New York Islanders; 2022–2024	Succeeded by Patrick Roy
Preceded by Dan Bylsma	Head coach of the Seattle Kraken; 2025–present	Incumbent
