= Bob Berry (ice hockey) =

Canadian ice hockey player and coach

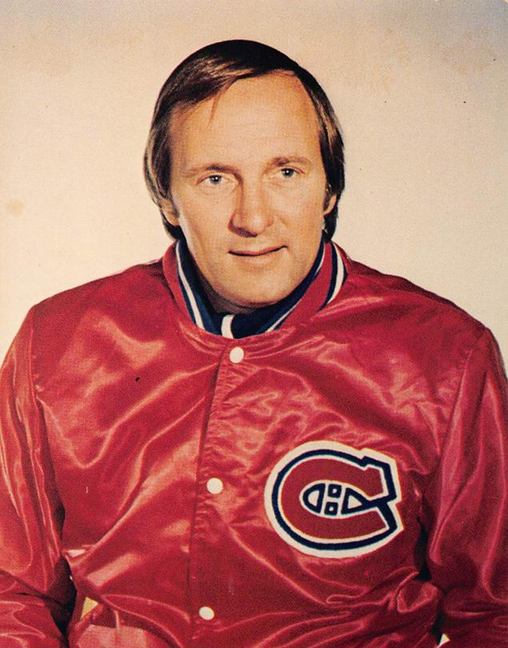
- Born: November 29, 1943 (age 82) Montreal, Quebec, Canada
- Height: 6 ft 0 in (183 cm)
- Weight: 185 lb (84 kg; 13 st 3 lb)
- Position: Left wing
- Shot: Left
- Played for: Montreal Canadiens; Los Angeles Kings
- Playing career: 1968–1978

Bob Berry (born November 29, 1943) is a Canadian former professional ice hockey left winger who played eight seasons in the National Hockey League (NHL) with the Montreal Canadiens and Los Angeles Kings between 1968 and 1977. Bob was elected to play in two NHL all star games. He has also served as a head coach in the NHL for the Los Angeles Kings, Montreal Canadiens, Pittsburgh Penguins and St. Louis Blues between 1978 and 1994.

== Playing career ==
Born in Montreal, Quebec, Berry began his junior hockey career with the Peterborough Petes of the OHA before deciding to attend Sir George Williams University (now Concordia University) in Montreal where he would play three years of collegiate hockey in the OQAA (now CIS). In 1966 Berry joined Canada's National Hockey Team and was later signed by the Montreal Canadiens to his first professional contract in 1968 at age 25. With the Canadiens having a deep roster at left wing, Berry would only manage to suit up for two games with the Canadiens in 1968-69. He spent the following year playing in the AHL for the Montreal Voyageurs and the Canadiens eventually sold his rights to the Los Angeles Kings in 1970 giving him a better opportunity to earn a spot on an NHL roster. Berry joined the Los Angeles Kings the following year in 1970-71 and registered 63 points in 73 games in his rookie season, placing him only 9 points back of eventual Calder Trophy winner Gil Perreault of the Buffalo Sabres. In 1972-73 Berry scored a career high 36 goals with the Kings and was selected to play in his first NHL All-Star game on January 30, 1973 at Madison Square Garden in New York. Berry was selected to play in the All-Star game again the following year at the Chicago Stadium. He finished his NHL career with 350 points in 541 regular season games.

== Coaching career ==
=== Los Angeles Kings ===
After retiring as a player in 1978 with the AHL's Springfield Indians, he returned to Los Angeles to become the eighth head coach in Kings history in 1978-79. He led the Kings to the Stanley Cup playoffs in each of his three seasons behind the bench. However, in each of those years from 1978–79 to 1980–81 they were defeated in the opening round of the playoffs. Berry eventually resigned as head coach at the end of the 1980–81 campaign after the Kings posted a 43W–24L–13T record and lost to the New York Rangers in the preliminary round. Despite his lack of success in the playoffs, Berry is credited with giving rise to the famed "Triple Crown Line" during his tenure as head coach, putting Marcel Dionne, Charlie Simmer and Dave Taylor on the same line for the very first time in a game at Joe Louis Arena in 1979 vs. the Detroit Red Wings.

=== Montreal Canadiens ===
He moved on to take the head coaching assignment in his hometown of Montreal replacing Claude Ruel behind the Canadiens bench to start the 1981–82 NHL season. Despite winning 46 and 42 games respectively in his first two years at the helm, His Canadiens were eliminated in the first round of the Stanley Cup playoffs in 1981–82 (by the Quebec Nordiques) and in 1982–83 (by the Buffalo Sabres). This would mark the fifth straight season he would lose in the first round of the playoffs as a head coach. With the team playing below .500 in his third year behind the bench in 1983–84, he was eventually fired by the Canadiens and was replaced by Jacques Lemaire 63 games into the season. To date, he is the last non-interim Canadiens coach who was not fully bilingual in English and French, though he spoke French well enough to have a simple conversation.

=== Pittsburgh Penguins ===
He was named the 9th head coach in Pittsburgh Penguins history on June 4, 1984 a mere 5 days prior to the 1984 NHL entry draft that was held at the Montreal Forum in which Pittsburgh Penguins general manager Eddie Johnston selected Mario Lemieux 1st overall from the Laval Voisins of the QMJHL. Even though Berry's new team drafted their future franchise player, he inherited a Penguins team that had failed to reach the playoffs the previous two seasons. That streak continued under his guidance for the next three seasons as the Penguins missed reaching the playoffs for the fifth straight year in 1986-87. He was eventually relieved of his head coaching position at the end of the 1986–87 NHL season on April 13, 1987.

=== St. Louis Blues ===
He returned to coaching for the 1988–89 NHL season after a two-year hiatus, this time joining the St. Louis Blues coaching staff as an assistant with Joe Micheletti under head coach Brian Sutter. He finally got a taste of playoff success behind the bench as his team defeated the Minnesota North Stars in the opening round of the playoffs 4–1. The Blues then faced their rival, the Chicago Blackhawks in round 2 but lost that series in five games.

The Blues qualified for the playoffs in the following three seasons. However, they were unable to advance past the second round in either of those years. Berry was appointed assistant GM of the Blues under GM Ron Caron in the summer before the start of the 1992–93 season. The Blues then hired former St. Louis defenceman Bob Plager to take over the head coaching duties. After the Blues got off to a slow start Plager stepped down after a 6–4 victory over Berry's former team, the Pittsburgh Penguins, on October 30, 1992. He took over the head coaching duties after Plager's departure and from there he helped the Blues reach the playoffs once again in the spring of 1993. The Blues swept the Chicago Blackhawks in the first round, and he finally made it to the second round of the post-season as a head coach in the NHL. However, his post-season success, as well as the Blues,' was short lived as Berry's team was knocked out in the second round by the Toronto Maple Leafs in a hard fought 7 games series that went the distance. He remained on as head coach of the Blues the next season with Ted Sator joining the fold as an assistant. The Blues made the playoffs once again but were swept in the first round by the Dallas Stars. The St. Louis Blues then named Mike Keenan head coach to start the 1994-95 NHL season with Berry and Sator staying on staff as associate coaches. It remained status quo for the Blues with Keenan and Berry behind the bench as they failed to advance past the second round the following two seasons. 1995–96 would be his final season behind the Blues bench.

=== San Jose Sharks ===
In San Jose, his was hired on as an assistant under head coach Darryl Sutter to replace the departed Roy Sommer, teaming up with former Calgary Flame tough guy Paul Baxter who was already in place as Sutter's other assistant. He spent two seasons in San Jose as an assistant under Sutter before retiring as a coach in 1999-2000.

== Front office ==
He currently serves as a pro scout for the Chicago Blackhawks. He has also served as a pro scout in the NHL for the Los Angeles Kings, St. Louis Blues, and Ottawa Senators.

== Awards and achievements ==
- Played in 26th annual NHL All-Star game, January 30, 1973. (Madison Square Garden) New York, NY.
- Played in 27th annual NHL All-Star game, January 29, 1974. (Chicago Stadium) Chicago, IL.

== Career statistics ==
=== Regular season and playoffs ===
			Regular season					Playoffs
Season	Team	League	GP	G	A	Pts	PIM	GP	G	A	Pts	PIM
1962–63	Middlebury College	NCAA III	—	—	—	—	—	—	—	—	—	—
1963–64	Verdun Maple Leafs	MMJHL	25	38	27	65	93	—	—	—	—	—
1963–64	Peterborough Petes	OHA	11	4	3	7	36	2	0	0	0	4
1964–65	Sir George Williams College	OQAA	17	13	27	40	—	—	—	—	—	—
1965–66	Sir George Williams College	OQAA	27	36	48	84	—	—	—	—	—	—
1966–67	Sir George Williams College	OQAA	31	48	41	89	—	—	—	—	—	—
1966–67	Canadian National Team	Intl	5	1	1	2	0	—	—	—	—	—
1967–68	Hull Nationals	QUE Sr	39	32	23	55	80	—	—	—	—	—
1968–69	Montreal Canadiens	NHL	2	0	0	0	0	—	—	—	—	—
1968–69	Cleveland Barons	AHL	68	24	29	53	104	5	0	3	3	10
1969–70	Montreal Voyageurs	AHL	71	18	41	59	104	8	1	0	1	11
1970–71	Los Angeles Kings	NHL	77	25	38	63	52	—	—	—	—	—
1971–72	Los Angeles Kings	NHL	78	17	22	39	44	—	—	—	—	—
1972–73	Los Angeles Kings	NHL	78	36	28	64	75	—	—	—	—	—
1973–74	Los Angeles Kings	NHL	77	23	33	56	56	5	0	0	0	0
1974–75	Los Angeles Kings	NHL	80	25	23	48	60	3	1	2	3	2
1975–76	Los Angeles Kings	NHL	80	20	22	42	37	9	1	1	2	0
1976–77	Los Angeles Kings	NHL	69	13	25	38	20	9	0	3	3	4
1976–77	Fort Worth Texans	CHL	7	4	4	8	0	—	—	—	—	—
1977–78	Springfield Indians	AHL	74	26	27	53	56	4	0	0	0	0
NHL totals			541	159	191	350	344	26	2	6	8	6

== Coaching record ==
Team	Year	Regular season						Post season			
Team	Year	G	W	L	T	Pts	Finish	W	L	Pct.	Result
LAK	1978–79	80	34	34	12	80	3rd in Norris	0	2	.000	Lost in Preliminary round (NYR)
LAK	1979–80	80	30	36	14	74	2nd in Norris	1	3	.250	Lost in Preliminary round (NYI)
LAK	1980–81	80	43	24	13	99	2nd in Norris	1	3	.250	Lost in Preliminary round (NYR)
MTL	1981–82	80	46	17	17	109	1st in Adams	2	3	.400	Lost in Division semifinals (QUE)
MTL	1982–83	80	42	24	14	98	2nd in Adams	0	3	.000	Lost in Division semifinals (BUF)
MTL	1983–84	63	28	30	5	60	(fired)	—	—	—	—
PIT	1984–85	80	24	51	5	53	6th in Patrick	—	—	—	Missed playoffs
PIT	1985–86	80	34	38	8	76	5th in Patrick	—	—	—	Missed playoffs
PIT	1986–87	80	30	38	12	72	5th in Patrick	—	—	—	Missed playoffs
STL	1992–93	73	33	30	10	76	4th in Norris	7	4	.636	Lost in Division finals (TOR)
STL	1993–94	84	40	33	11	91	4th in Central	0	4	.000	Lost in Quarterfinals (DAL)
Total		860	384	355	121			11	22	.333	7 playoff appearances

== Transactions ==
- Sold by the Montreal Canadiens to the Los Angeles Kings, October 8, 1970.

Preceded by Ron Stewart	Head coach of the Los Angeles Kings; 1978–81	Succeeded by Parker MacDonald
Preceded by Claude Ruel	Head coach of the Montreal Canadiens; 1981–84	Succeeded by Jacques Lemaire
Preceded by Lou Angotti	Head coach of the Pittsburgh Penguins; 1984–87	Succeeded by Pierre Creamer
Preceded by Bob Plager	Head coach of the St. Louis Blues; 1992–94	Succeeded by Mike Keenan
