= Michel Therrien =

Canadian ice hockey coach (born 1963)

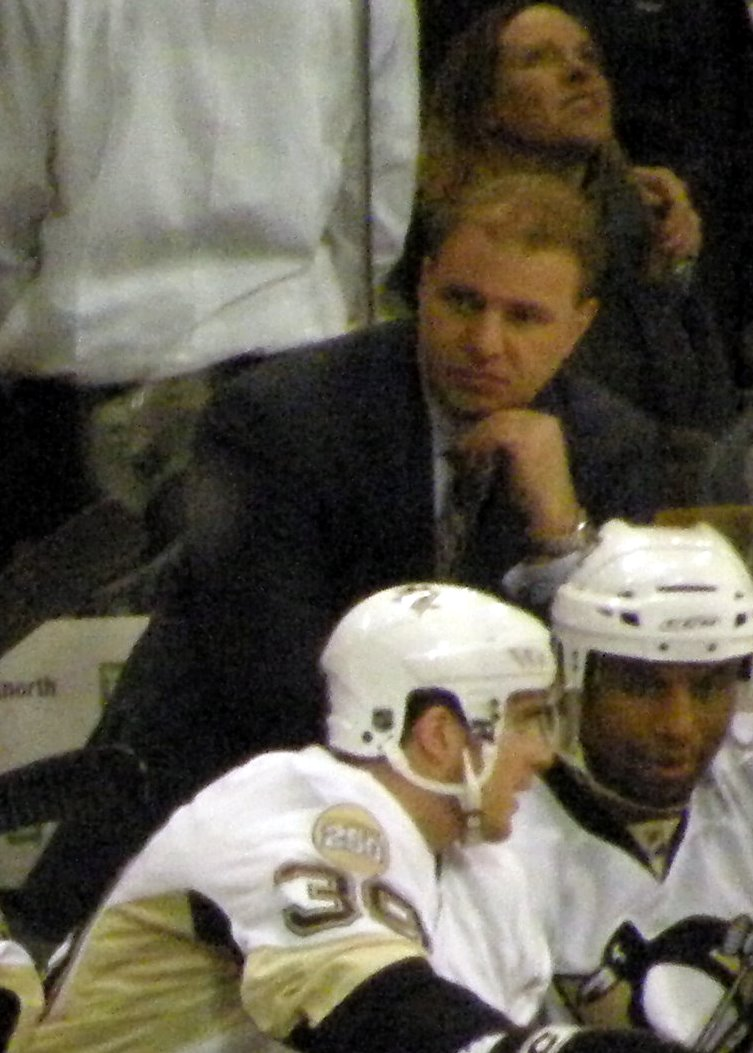
- Therrien in 2008
- Born: November 4, 1963 (age 62); Montreal, Quebec, Canada
- Other name: Bulldog
- Occupations: Former NHL scout Ice hockey coach
- Predecessor: Alain Vigneault (2000–01); Eddie Olczyk (2005–06); Randy Cunneyworth (2011–12)
- Successor: Dan Bylsma (2008–09); Claude Julien (2016–17)

Michel Therrien (born November 4, 1963) is a Canadian professional ice hockey coach. (NHL). Therrien was the head coach of the Montreal Canadiens (twice), and the Pittsburgh Penguins, and was an assistant coach for the Philadelphia Flyers.

Prior to his coaching career, Therrien played professionally for three years as a defenceman in the American Hockey League (AHL), compiling a total of 86 points in 206 games and winning the Calder Cup in 1985 with the Sherbrooke Canadiens, on the same team as eventual Hockey Hall of Famer Patrick Roy. When his playing career ended, Therrien worked for a time as a lineman for Bell Canada, with a sideline as a bodyguard for Quebec singing star Roch Voisine, with whom he had once played hockey, while working his way into a coaching career.

Before coaching in the professional leagues, Therrien was a coach in the Quebec Major Junior Hockey League (QMJHL), first as an assistant with the Laval Titan and later as head coach for the Granby Prédateurs, with whom the club won the Memorial Cup in 1996, ending a 25-year championship drought in the tournament for a team from Quebec. He is a single parent of two children, Elizabeth and Charles.

== Coaching career ==
=== Montreal Canadiens ===
In 2000, after stumbling out to a 5–13–2 record, the Montreal Canadiens fired head coach Alain Vigneault and hired rookie Michel Therrien. The Canadiens went 23–27–6–6 under Therrien and missed the 2001 Stanley Cup playoffs.

In his first full season as the Canadiens head coach, Michel led the Habs to an impressive record of 36–31–15, a 16-point improvement from the previous year. In the 2002 playoffs, Therrien's Canadiens upset the top-seeded Boston Bruins in six games before losing to the Carolina Hurricanes.

=== Pittsburgh Penguins ===
For two-and-a-half seasons, Therrien was the head coach of the American Hockey League (AHL)'s Wilkes-Barre/Scranton Penguins. He led the Penguins to the Calder Cup playoffs in 2004 and 2005.

After leading Wilkes-Barre/Scranton to a franchise-record start (21–1–2–1) in the 2005–06 season, Therrien was promoted by Pittsburgh on December 15, 2005, as a mid-season replacement for Ed Olczyk. The Pens, however, did not turn their season around, going 14–29–8 under Therrien. The Penguins started the 2006–07 season in mediocre fashion. However, they picked up play in January, going 14–0–2 on one stretch. The streak led the Penguins to a 47–24–11 record and a fifth-place berth in the 2007 playoffs. The Pens, however, fell in five games to the Ottawa Senators.

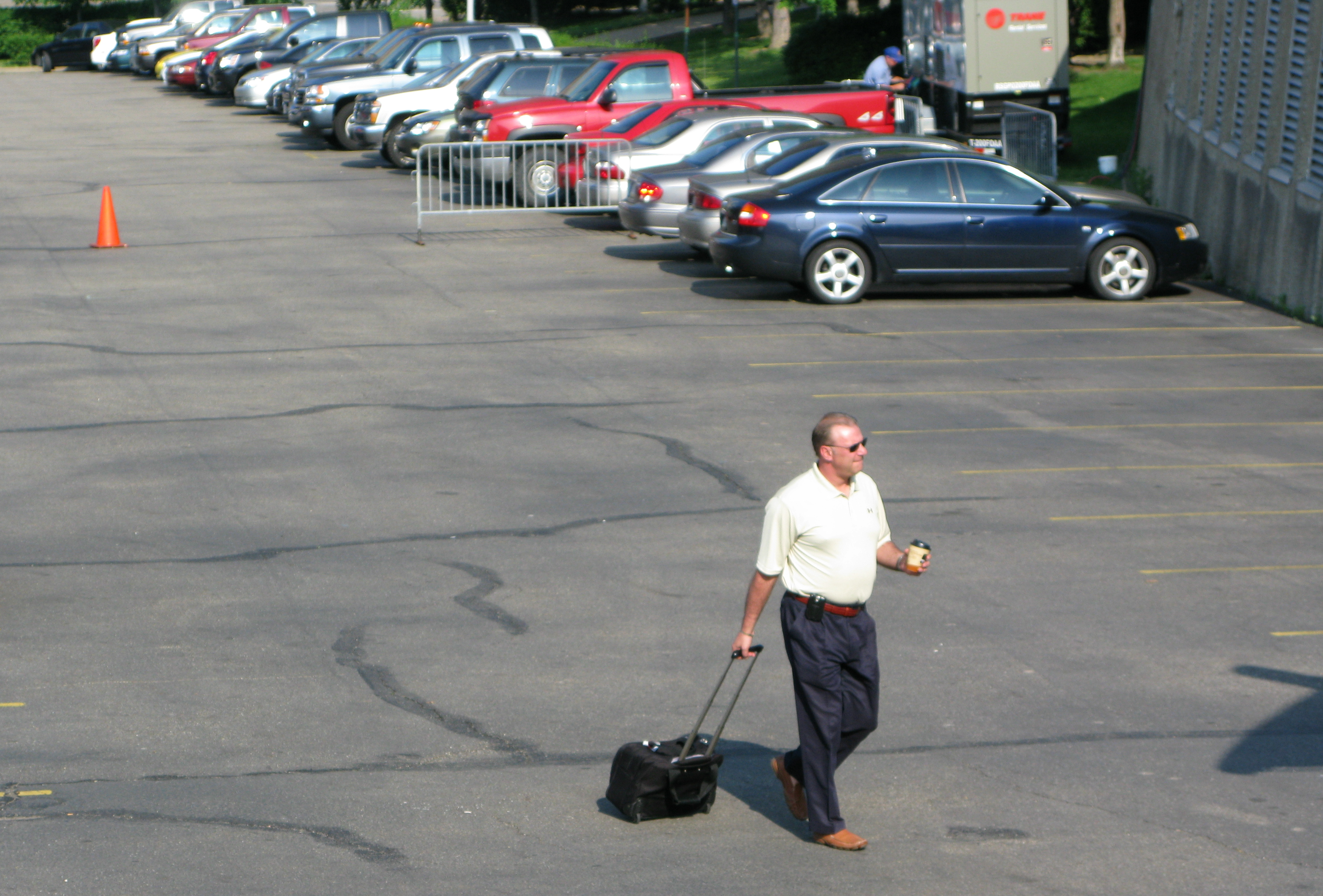
Michel Therrien walking to the Mellon Arena on June 6, 2008

During the 2006–07 season, Therrien coached the Penguins to one of the most successful single-season improvements in NHL history, finishing with a 47–24–11 record (105 points), a berth in the 2007 playoffs and a nomination for the Jack Adams Award as the NHL's Coach of the Year.

Despite a slow start the next season, in 2007–08, the Pens began to turn things around in November 2007. They would go on to win the 2008 Winter Classic and later clinch the Atlantic Division with a 4–2 win against their state-rivals, the Philadelphia Flyers. In the first round of the 2008 playoffs, the Pens avenged their 2007 playoff series loss by downing the Ottawa Senators in a four-game sweep. They then defeated the New York Rangers and the Philadelphia Flyers each in five games to win the 2008 Eastern Conference Championship and the Prince of Wales Trophy. The Pens eventually lost in the 2008 Stanley Cup Finals to the Detroit Red Wings in six games, finishing the playoffs with a 14–6 record. On July 18, 2008, Therrien signed a contract extension with the Penguins through to the 2010–11 NHL season.

The next season, the Penguins shot out to one of the best starts in franchise history, only to slow down considerably heading into December. The slide continued, and on February 15, 2009, a day after a 6–2 loss to the Toronto Maple Leafs and with the Penguins struggling to stay in the playoff race, Therrien was relieved of his duties as head coach of the Penguins. Therrien finished two games behind Red Kelly for the second-longest tenure as Penguins' head coach. Dan Bylsma took over as Therrien's replacement. After his termination, he continued to reside in Pittsburgh and followed the team as they advanced to the 2009 Stanley Cup Finals and won the Stanley Cup in Game 7 in Detroit.

=== Return to Montreal ===
On June 5, 2012, Montreal Canadiens executive vice president and general manager Marc Bergevin announced the appointment of Michel Therrien as the club’s new head coach. His first season was a successful one, leading the Habs to first in the Northeast Division after the team had finished last in the previous season. However, the team ended up losing in the first round to the Ottawa Senators in five games. In his second season, 2013–14, he led the Habs to the Eastern Conference Finals, though the team lost to the New York Rangers in six games. At the end of the season, general manager Marc Bergevin rewarded Therrien with a new contract, a four-year extension. With the contract, he became the highest-paid coach in the history of the Canadiens. In 2015–16, after starting the season with a 19–4–3 win–loss record, the Canadiens collapsed following an injury to goaltender Carey Price, ending the season with a .500 record and failing to make the playoffs. On November 4, 2016, his 53rd birthday, the Canadiens got blown out 10-0 by the Columbus Blue Jackets. On January 7, 2017, Therrien recorded his 400th win as a coach in a 5–3 victory over the Toronto Maple Leafs. However, on February 14, 2017, he was once again fired by the Canadiens and replaced as head coach by Claude Julien for the second time. At the time of his firing, the Canadiens were ranked first in the Atlantic Division with a 31–19–8 record. Their season started with a strong 13-1-1 start, but followed with a disappointing run of 18-18-7 which led to his firing.

=== Philadelphia Flyers ===
On May 5, 2019, Michel Therrien returned to the NHL as an assistant coach to Alain Vigneault of the Philadelphia Flyers. On December 6, 2021, Therrien was relieved of his duties.

=== Canada national team ===
In December 2025, Therrien coached Canada at the 2025 Spengler Cup. This appearance marked a return behind the bench for Therrien as well as his international coaching debut.

== Coaching record ==
Note: Brackets around points (Pts) indicate a partial season of coaching.

Team	Year	Regular season							Postseason			
Team	Year	G	W	L	T	OTL	Pts	Finish	W	L	Win %	Result
MTL	2000–01	62	23	27	6	6	(58)	5th in Northeast	—	—	—	Missed playoffs
MTL	2001–02	82	36	31	12	3	87	4th in Northeast	6	6	.500	Lost in Conference semifinals (CAR)
MTL	2002–03	46	18	19	5	4	(45)	(fired)	—	—	—	—
PIT	2005–06	51	14	29	—	8	(36)	5th in Atlantic	—	—	—	Missed playoffs
PIT	2006–07	82	47	24	—	11	105	2nd in Atlantic	1	4	.200	Lost in Conference quarterfinals (OTT)
PIT	2007–08	82	47	27	—	8	102	1st in Atlantic	14	6	.700	Lost in Stanley Cup Final (DET)
PIT	2008–09	57	27	25	—	5	(59)	(fired)	—	—	—	—
PIT total		272	135	105		32			15	10	.600	2 playoff appearances
MTL	2012–13	48	29	14	—	5	63	1st in Northeast	1	4	.200	Lost in Conference quarterfinals (OTT)
MTL	2013–14	82	46	28	—	8	100	3rd in Atlantic	10	7	.588	Lost in Conference finals (NYR)
MTL	2014–15	82	50	22	—	10	110	1st in Atlantic	6	6	.500	Lost in second round (TBL)
MTL	2015–16	82	38	38	—	6	82	6th in Atlantic	—	—	—	Missed playoffs
MTL	2016–17	58	31	19	—	8	(70)	(fired)	—	—	—	—
MTL total		542	271	198	23	50			23	23	.500	4 playoff appearances
Total		814	406	303	23	82			38	33	.535	6 playoff appearances

Sporting positions
Preceded by Alain Vigneault	Head coach of the Montreal Canadiens; 2000–2003	Succeeded by Claude Julien
Preceded by Glenn Patrick	Head coach of the Wilkes-Barre/Scranton Penguins; 2003–2005	Succeeded by Rick Kehoe
Preceded by Ed Olczyk	Head coach of the Pittsburgh Penguins; 2005–2009	Succeeded by Dan Bylsma
Preceded by Randy Cunneyworth (interim)	Head coach of the Montreal Canadiens; 2012–2017	Succeeded by Claude Julien
