= Andrew Brunette =

Canadian ice hockey player (born 1973)

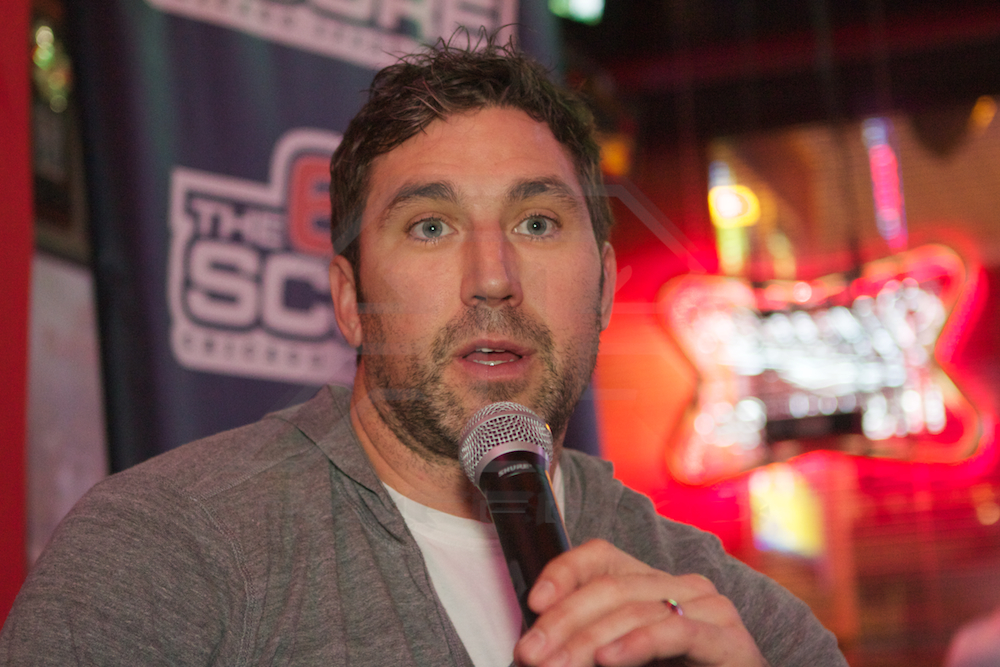
- Brunette in 2012
- Born: August 24, 1973 (age 52) Valley East, Ontario, Canada
- Height: 6 ft 1 in (185 cm)
- Weight: 212 lb (96 kg; 15 st 2 lb)
- Position: Left wing
- Shot: Left
- Played for: Washington Capitals; Nashville Predators; Atlanta Thrashers; Minnesota Wild; Colorado Avalanche; Chicago Blackhawks
- Current NHL coach: Nashville Predators
- Coached for: Florida Panthers
- NHL draft: 174th overall, 1993; Washington Capitals
- Playing career: 1993–2012
- Coaching career: 2014–present

Andrew D. Brunette (born August 24, 1973) is a Canadian professional ice hockey coach and former player who is the head coach for the Nashville Predators of the National Hockey League (NHL). As a player, Brunette played over 1,100 career games in the NHL with the Washington Capitals, Nashville Predators, Atlanta Thrashers, Minnesota Wild, Colorado Avalanche, and Chicago Blackhawks between 1996 and 2012. He previously served as interim head coach for the Florida Panthers, as an assistant coach for the Minnesota Wild and New Jersey Devils, and as the Wild's assistant general manager.

== Playing career ==
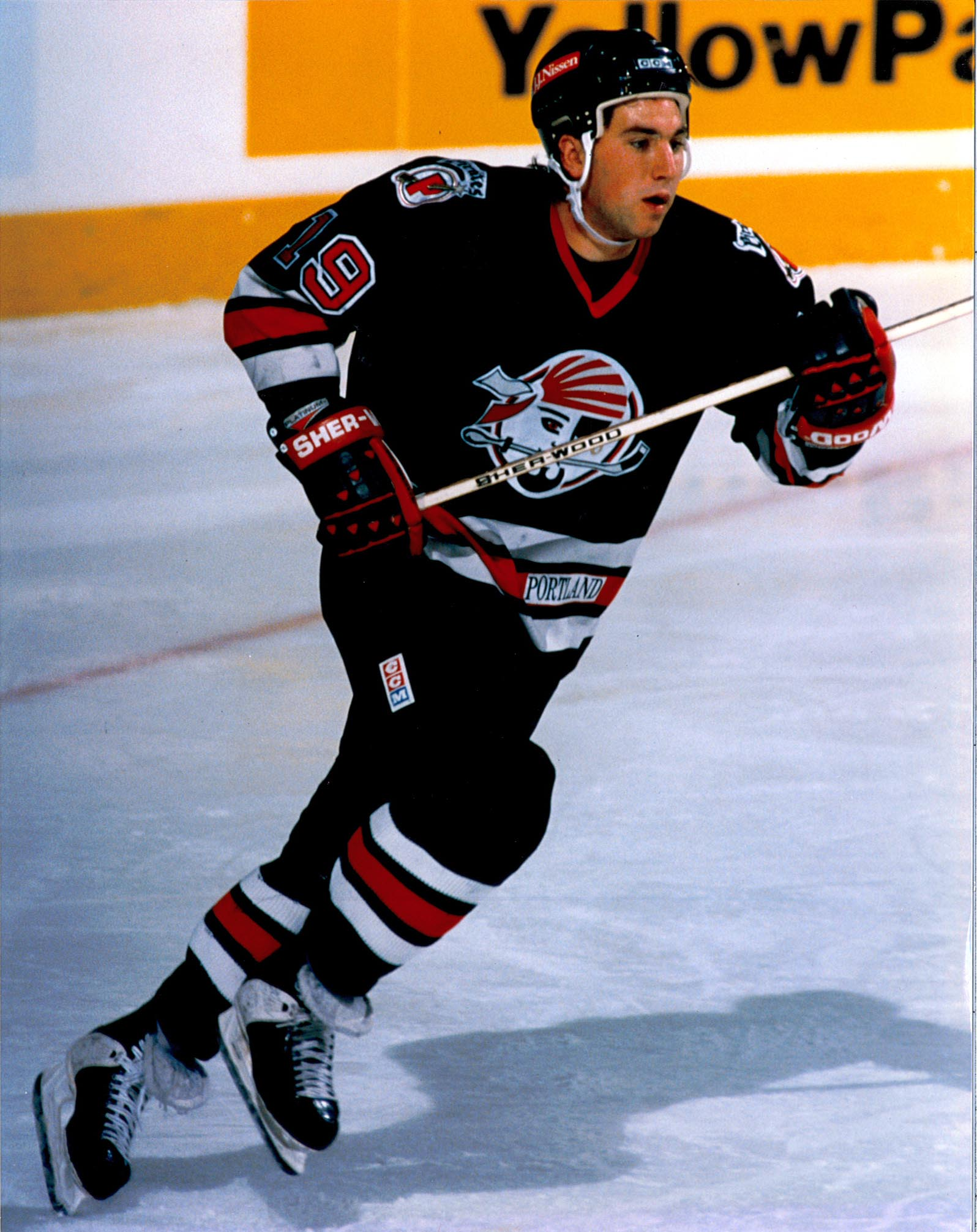
Brunette with the Portland Pirates

Brunette grew up in the small community of Valley East, Ontario, just outside Sudbury. He played much of his minor hockey career with the Rayside-Balfour Sabrecats of the Northern Ontario Hockey Association (NOHA).

After a solid Midget season in 1989–90, Brunette was selected in the seventh round of the 1990 Ontario Hockey League (OHL) Priority Selection by the Owen Sound Platers. He was an OHL teammate of future NHLers Kirk Maltby, Scott Walker, Kevin Weekes, and Jamie Storr.

Brunette played for the Platers for three seasons between 1990 and 1993 and scored 295 points in 195 games, winning the Eddie Powers Memorial Trophy (the league scoring title) in 1993. He was subsequently drafted by the Washington Capitals in the seventh round, 174th overall, in the 1993 NHL entry draft.

After being drafted, he played for the Hampton Roads Admirals in the ECHL before moving to the American Hockey League (AHL), where he played for two more teams that season: Providence Bruins and Portland Pirates. Brunette stayed with the Pirates until 1998 but was called up by the Capitals for the first time in the 1995–96 season and played 11 NHL games. Over the following few seasons, he played 51 more games for Washington before being selected in the 1998 NHL expansion draft by the Nashville Predators. Notably, he scored the Predators' first-ever goal.

After playing in the inaugural 1998–99 season for the Predators, he moved to the newly created Atlanta Thrashers and played two seasons there before moving to the Minnesota Wild in the 2001–02 season. Brunette scored the winning goal in overtime of Game 7 of the Western Conference Quarterfinals against the Colorado Avalanche on April 22, 2003, the final game of Avalanche goaltender Patrick Roy's career. Brunette stayed with the Wild until 2004 and signed as a free agent for the Colorado Avalanche after the 2004–05 lockout.

He scored the series-clinching goal for the Avalanche on April 30, 2006, against the Dallas Stars in Game 5 of the 2006 Western Conference Quarterfinals. The 2006–07 season was his best individual season, averaging over a point per game for his first time in the NHL, playing on a line with superstar centre Joe Sakic. Brunette scored his 500th NHL career point on October 26, 2007, against the Calgary Flames. He played three consecutive full 82-game seasons with the Avalanche.

Brunette signed a three-year, $7 million contract with the Minnesota Wild on July 1, 2008, to begin a second stint with the club. On October 9, he was named an alternate captain alongside Mikko Koivu.

Brunette was highly regarded for his physical durability and consistency, qualities which allowed him to play in 509 consecutive games without having to sit out due to injury from 2002 to 2009. However, he was diagnosed with a torn ACL in his right knee but insisted on finishing the 2008–09 season before having surgery in the off-season.

On July 1, 2011, Brunette signed a one-year, $2 million with the Chicago Blackhawks. During the 2011–12 season, Brunette, in a reduced role, recorded a career-low in points with 27 in 78 games.

With the 2012–13 NHL lockout and limited NHL interest as a free agent upon the resumption of the shortened 2012–13 season, on February 13, 2013, Brunette announced his retirement from his playing career and that he would rejoin the Minnesota Wild organization as its hockey operations advisor.

== Coaching career ==
Brunette was an assistant coach of the Minnesota Wild for two seasons from the 2014–15 season and served as the Wild's assistant general manager until the conclusion of the 2018–19 season. On June 4, 2019, he joined the Florida Panthers as an assistant coach on head coach Joel Quenneville's staff. On October 29, 2021, Brunette was named the interim head coach of the Panthers after head coach Quenneville resigned on October 28. Following the Panthers getting swept by the Lightning in the Eastern Conference Semi-Finals, there was much uncertainty about Brunette's future as head coach. On June 22, 2022, the Panthers announced that Paul Maurice would be the next head coach of the franchise. Brunette was offered a significant position within the organization, but ultimately decided to leave for an assistant position with the New Jersey Devils.

After one season in New Jersey, Brunette was named head coach of the Nashville Predators, whom he had previously played for, on May 31, 2023.

== Career statistics ==
| | | | Regular season | | | | | Playoffs |
| Season | Team | League | GP | G | A | Pts | PIM | GP | G | A | Pts | PIM |
|---|---|---|---|---|---|---|---|---|---|---|---|---|
| 1989–90 | Rayside-Balfour Canadians | NOJHL | 4 | 1 | 1 | 2 | 0 | — | — | — | — | — |
| 1989–90 | Rayside-Balfour Sabrecats | GNML | 32 | 38 | 65 | 103 | 20 | — | — | — | — | — |
| 1990–91 | Owen Sound Platers | OHL | 63 | 15 | 20 | 35 | 15 | — | — | — | — | — |
| 1991–92 | Owen Sound Platers | OHL | 66 | 51 | 47 | 98 | 42 | 5 | 5 | 0 | 5 | 8 |
| 1992–93 | Owen Sound Platers | OHL | 66 | 62 | 100 | 162 | 91 | 8 | 8 | 6 | 14 | 16 |
| 1993–94 | Hampton Roads Admirals | ECHL | 20 | 12 | 18 | 30 | 32 | 7 | 7 | 6 | 13 | 18 |
| 1993–94 | Providence Bruins | AHL | 3 | 0 | 0 | 0 | 0 | — | — | — | — | — |
| 1993–94 | Portland Pirates | AHL | 23 | 9 | 11 | 20 | 10 | 2 | 0 | 1 | 1 | 0 |
| 1994–95 | Portland Pirates | AHL | 79 | 30 | 50 | 80 | 53 | 7 | 3 | 3 | 6 | 10 |
| 1995–96 | Portland Pirates | AHL | 69 | 28 | 66 | 94 | 125 | 20 | 11 | 18 | 29 | 15 |
| 1995–96 | Washington Capitals | NHL | 11 | 3 | 3 | 6 | 0 | 6 | 1 | 3 | 4 | 0 |
| 1996–97 | Portland Pirates | AHL | 50 | 22 | 51 | 73 | 48 | 5 | 1 | 2 | 3 | 0 |
| 1996–97 | Washington Capitals | NHL | 23 | 4 | 7 | 11 | 12 | — | — | — | — | — |
| 1997–98 | Portland Pirates | AHL | 43 | 21 | 46 | 67 | 64 | 10 | 1 | 11 | 12 | 12 |
| 1997–98 | Washington Capitals | NHL | 28 | 11 | 12 | 23 | 12 | — | — | — | — | — |
| 1998–99 | Nashville Predators | NHL | 77 | 11 | 20 | 31 | 26 | — | — | — | — | — |
| 1999–00 | Atlanta Thrashers | NHL | 81 | 23 | 27 | 50 | 30 | — | — | — | — | — |
| 2000–01 | Atlanta Thrashers | NHL | 77 | 15 | 44 | 59 | 26 | — | — | — | — | — |
| 2001–02 | Minnesota Wild | NHL | 81 | 21 | 48 | 69 | 18 | — | — | — | — | — |
| 2002–03 | Minnesota Wild | NHL | 82 | 18 | 28 | 46 | 20 | 18 | 7 | 6 | 13 | 4 |
| 2003–04 | Minnesota Wild | NHL | 82 | 15 | 34 | 49 | 12 | — | — | — | — | — |
| 2005–06 | Colorado Avalanche | NHL | 82 | 24 | 39 | 63 | 48 | 9 | 3 | 6 | 9 | 8 |
| 2006–07 | Colorado Avalanche | NHL | 82 | 27 | 56 | 83 | 36 | — | — | — | — | — |
| 2007–08 | Colorado Avalanche | NHL | 82 | 19 | 40 | 59 | 14 | 10 | 5 | 3 | 8 | 2 |
| 2008–09 | Minnesota Wild | NHL | 80 | 22 | 28 | 50 | 18 | — | — | — | — | — |
| 2009–10 | Minnesota Wild | NHL | 82 | 25 | 36 | 61 | 12 | — | — | — | — | — |
| 2010–11 | Minnesota Wild | NHL | 82 | 18 | 28 | 46 | 16 | — | — | — | — | — |
| 2011–12 | Chicago Blackhawks | NHL | 78 | 12 | 15 | 27 | 4 | 6 | 1 | 0 | 1 | 0 |
| NHL totals | | | 1,110 | 268 | 465 | 733 | 314 | 49 | 17 | 18 | 35 | 14 |

== Head coaching record ==
| Team | Year | Regular season | | | | | | Postseason | | | |
| Team | Year | G | W | L | OTL | Pts | Finish | W | L | Win% | Result |
|---|---|---|---|---|---|---|---|---|---|---|---|
| FLA | 2021–22 | 75 | 51 | 18 | 6 | 108 | 1st in Atlantic | 4 | 6 | .400 | Lost in second round (TBL) |
| FLA total | | 75 | 51 | 18 | 6 | | | 4 | 6 | .400 | 1 playoff appearance |
| NSH | 2023–24 | 82 | 47 | 30 | 5 | 99 | 4th in Central | 2 | 4 | .333 | Lost in first round (VAN) |
| NSH | 2024–25 | 82 | 30 | 44 | 8 | 68 | 7th in Central | — | — | — | Missed playoffs |
| NSH | 2025–26 | 82 | 38 | 34 | 10 | 86 | 6th in Central | — | — | — | Missed playoffs |
| NSH total | | 246 | 115 | 108 | 23 | | | 2 | 4 | .333 | 1 playoff appearance |
| Total | | 321 | 166 | 126 | 29 | | | 6 | 10 | .333 | 2 playoff appearances |

== See also ==
- List of NHL players with 1,000 games played

Sporting positions
| Preceded by Brad Brown; Brad Brown; Jim Dowd; Mikko Koivu | Minnesota Wild captain February–April 2002; November 2003; March–April 2004; February 2009 | Succeeded by Brad Bombardir; Richard Park; Alex Henry; Mikko Koivu |
| Preceded by Joel Quenneville | Head coach of the Florida Panthers (interim); 2021–2022 | Succeeded by Paul Maurice |
| Preceded by John Hynes | Head coach of the Nashville Predators; 2023–present | Incumbent |
