= List of Nashville Predators head coaches =

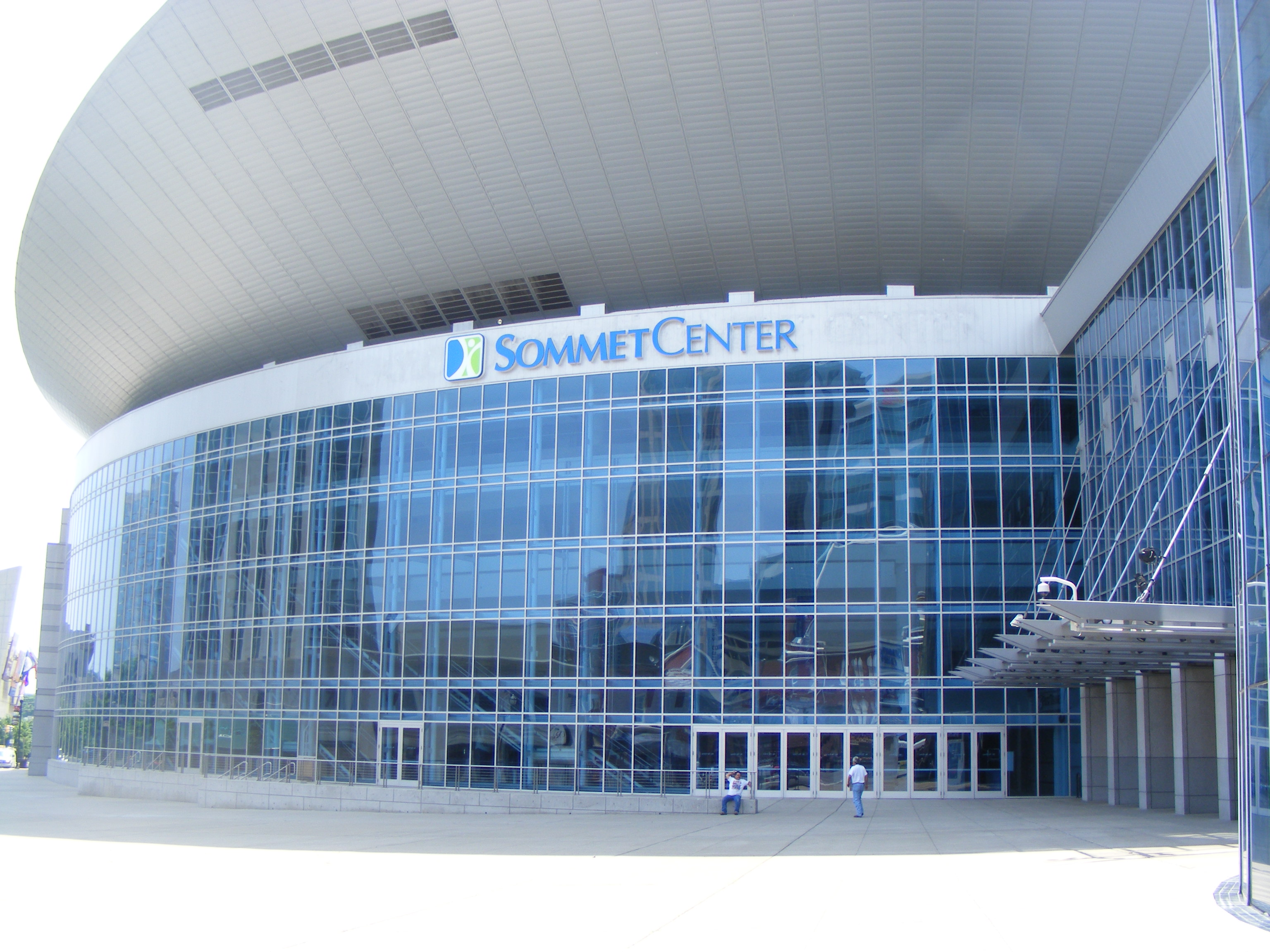
The Predators have played their home games at the Bridgestone Arena (formerly the Sommet Center) since their inaugural season.

The Nashville Predators are an American professional ice hockey team based in Nashville, Tennessee. They play in the Central Division of the Western Conference in the National Hockey League (NHL). The team joined the NHL in 1998 as an expansion team. The Predators have played their home games at the Bridgestone Arena since their inaugural season. The Predators are owned by Predators Holdings LLC, Barry Trotz is their general manager.

Until the end of the 2013–14 season, the Predators franchise had only had one head coach, Barry Trotz. Trotz was then replaced by Peter Laviolette on May 6, 2014. Laviolette helped the Predators capture their first Clarence S. Campbell Bowl as well as making the team's first Stanley Cup Finals appearance. John Hynes replaced Laviolette during the 2019–20 season; after three and a half seasons, he was fired on May 30, 2023. The following day, former Predator Andrew Brunette was named head coach.

== Key ==
| # | Number of coaches (Note: A running total of the number of coaches of the Predators. Thus, any coach who has two or more separate terms as head coach is only counted once.) |
| GC | Games coached |
| W | Wins = 2 points |
| L | Losses = 0 points |
| T | Ties = 1 point |
| OT | Overtime/shootout losses = 1 point (Note: Before the 2005–06 season, the NHL instituted a penalty shootout for regular season games that remained tied after a five-minute overtime period, which prevented ties.) |
| Pts | Points |
| Win % | Winning percentage |
| * | Spent entire NHL head coaching career with the Predators |

== Coaches ==
Note: Statistics are correct through the 2025–26 season.

| # | Name | Term (Note: Each year is linked to an article about that particular NHL season.) | Regular season | | | | | | Playoffs | | | | Achievements | Reference |
| # | Name | Term | GC | W | L | OT | Pts | Win % | GC | W | L | Win % | Achievements | Reference |
|---|---|---|---|---|---|---|---|---|---|---|---|---|---|---|
| 1 | Barry Trotz | 1998–2014 | 1,196 | 557 | 479 | 160 | 1,274 | .533 | 50 | 19 | 31 | .380 | | |
| 2 | Peter Laviolette | 2014–2020 | 451 | 248 | 143 | 60 | 556 | .616 | 61 | 32 | 29 | .525 | Presidents' Trophy (2017–18) | |
| 3 | John Hynes | 2020–2023 | 248 | 134 | 96 | 18 | 286 | .577 | 14 | 3 | 11 | .214 | | |
| 4 | Andrew Brunette | 2023–present | 246 | 115 | 108 | 23 | 253 | .514 | 6 | 2 | 4 | .333 | | |

== Bibliography ==
- "Nashville Predators Coach Register". Hockey-Reference.com. Sports Reference LLC.
