= Gene Ubriaco =

Canadian ice hockey player (b. 1937)

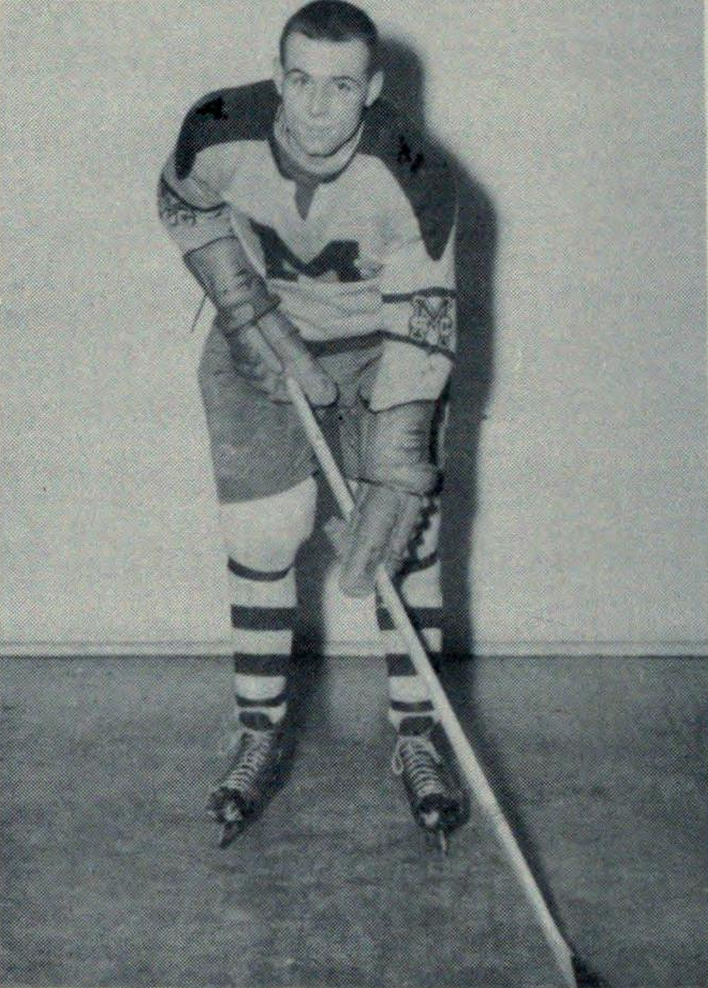
- Gene Ubriaco, circa 1956
- Born: December 26, 1937 (age 88) Sault Ste. Marie, Ontario, Canada
- Height: 5 ft 8 in (173 cm)
- Weight: 175 lb (79 kg; 12 st 7 lb)
- Position: Left wing
- Shot: Left
- Played for: Chicago Black Hawks; Oakland Seals; Pittsburgh Penguins
- Playing career: 1958–1970

Eugene Stephen Ubriaco (born December 26, 1937) is a Canadian professional ice hockey executive and former player. He is currently the director of hockey operations for the Chicago Wolves of the American Hockey League (AHL). As a player, Ubriaco played three seasons with the Pittsburgh Penguins, Oakland Seals, and Chicago Black Hawks in the National Hockey League. In 1970, he returned to school to become a coach, which led to his return to the NHL as the coach of the Pittsburgh Penguins in 1988. He later moved to the Chicago Wolves as coach in 1994 and has remained with the organization ever since.

== Personal ==
Ubriaco was born in Sault Ste. Marie, Ontario. Ubriaco and his wife Nella were married in 1962. They have a daughter Francine and a son Gene and live in the Chicago area. Ubriaco is a part-owner of Ubriaco's Take Home Italian Eatery and Ubriaco's Eatery and Pizzeria in Sault Ste. Marie with his daughter Francine and her husband Chuck Gassi.

== Hockey career ==
Ubriaco played juvenile hockey in Sault Ste. Marie, and was a member of the 1953–54 Doran's team which won Sault, Northern Ontario and All-Ontario titles. Ubriaco signed with the Toronto Maple Leafs and moved to Toronto to play for their junior affiliate Toronto St. Michael's Majors.

In 1958, Ubriaco started his professional career with the New Westminster Royals and later played for Leafs' affiliates Rochester Americans and Pittsburgh Hornets. By 1962, Ubriaco wished to settle down with a team and start a family and asked for a trade from the Leafs. The Leafs accommodated his wish and he was traded to the Hershey Bears of the AHL. Ubriaco was very successful with the Bears, with a personal-best season of 38 goals and 86 points in the 1965–66 season. When the 1967 NHL Expansion came, and a potential chance to play in the NHL came, the Bears were not NHL-affiliated and this meant that Ubriaco was not eligible for the 1967 NHL Expansion Draft. Working for a broadcaster at the time, and covering the draft, Ubriaco learned that his only path to playing in the NHL was to hold out from the Bears. Ubriaco held out and was traded to the newly formed Pittsburgh Penguins. Ubriaco played parts of two seasons before being traded to the Oakland Seals. He was traded again, one season later, to the Chicago Black Hawks. He retired after the 1969–70 season after having played 177 NHL games. Ubriaco recorded 39 goals and 35 assists for 74 career points.

Ubriaco turned to coaching and was in charge of the Lake Superior state hockey program by the 1972–73 season. After coaching in a number of leagues, Ubriaco was named Pittsburgh Penguins head coach in 1988, replacing Pierre Creamer. Ubriaco's 1988–1989 Penguins, led by Mario Lemieux's 85 goals and 199 points, as well as Rob Brown's 115 points, finished second in the Patrick Division and qualified for the playoffs for the first time in seven seasons. In the 1989 playoffs, the Penguins swept the New York Rangers before losing to the Philadelphia Flyers in seven games in the Patrick Division Final. Ubriaco's Penguins then got off to a slow start in the 1989–1990 season. Ubriaco as well as the man who hired him, Penguins general manager Tony Esposito, were both fired and replaced by Craig Patrick in December 1989.

Ubriaco coached the Italian Olympic ice hockey team during the 1992 Winter Olympics in Albertville, France. In 1994, Ubriaco became the first head coach of the new Chicago Wolves, then of the International Hockey League (IHL). He coached for two seasons including their inaugural season of 1994–95 before taking other positions with the club. He was named director of hockey operations for the Wolves in 1997. In 2009, the title of senior advisor was added.

On April 8, 2010, Ubriaco was part of the Mellon Arena final regular season game ceremony as one of five men in Penguins history to play for the Penguins and later coach them, sharing that distinction with Ken Schinkel, Lou Angotti, Rick Kehoe, and Ed Olczyk.

== Awards ==
- 1973–74 - United States Hockey League Coach of the Year
- 1979–80 - Eastern Hockey League Coach of the Year
- 1981 - Sault Ste. Marie Hockey Hall of Fame
- 1982–83 - Jake Milford Trophy (Central Hockey League Coach of the Year)
- 1983–84 - Louis A.R. Pieri Memorial Award (American Hockey League Coach of the Year)
- 2012 - Illinois Hockey Hall of Fame
- 2021 - Italian American Sports Hall of Fame

Sources: hockeydb.com, Chicago Wolves, Sault Star, Illinois Hockey Hall of Fame, Sault Ste. Marie Hockey Hall of Fame

== Career statistics ==
=== Regular season and playoffs ===
			Regular season					Playoffs
Season	Team	League	GP	G	A	Pts	PIM	GP	G	A	Pts	PIM
1954–55	Toronto St. Michael's Majors	OHA	28	2	5	7	14	4	1	1	2	0
1955–56	Toronto St. Michael's Majors	OHA	48	26	16	42	44	8	3	4	7	6
1956–57	Toronto St. Michael's Majors	OHA	52	22	32	54	49	4	1	3	4	0
1957–58	Toronto St. Michael's Majors	OHA	39	19	18	37	43	9	10	6	16	4
1958–59	New Westminster Royals	WHL	63	19	19	38	33	—	—	—	—	—
1959–60	Sudbury Wolves	EPHL	70	30	32	62	40	14	2	4	6	12
1960–61	Sudbury Wolves	EPHL	24	4	12	16	27	—	—	—	—	—
1960–61	Rochester Americans	AHL	60	16	24	40	15	—	—	—	—	—
1961–62	Pittsburgh Hornets	AHL	44	13	12	25	14	—	—	—	—	—
1962–63	Rochester Americans	AHL	72	22	48	70	21	2	1	0	1	0
1963–64	Hershey Bears	AHL	72	13	45	58	36	6	5	3	8	2
1964–65	Hershey Bears	AHL	63	15	32	47	12	15	3	6	9	0
1965–66	Hershey Bears	AHL	72	42	44	86	18	3	1	1	2	0
1966–67	Hershey Bears	AHL	69	38	43	81	50	5	3	0	3	2
1967–68	Pittsburgh Penguins	NHL	65	18	15	33	16	—	—	—	—	—
1967–68	Baltimore Clippers	AHL	6	1	4	5	6	—	—	—	—	—
1968–69	Pittsburgh Penguins	NHL	49	15	11	26	14	—	—	—	—	—
1968–69	Oakland Seals	NHL	26	4	7	11	14	7	2	0	2	2
1969–70	Oakland Seals	NHL	16	1	1	2	4	—	—	—	—	—
1969–70	Providence Reds	AHL	8	2	6	8	8	—	—	—	—	—
1969–70	Chicago Black Hawks	NHL	21	1	1	2	2	4	0	0	0	2
AHL totals			466	162	258	420	180	31	13	10	23	4
NHL totals			177	39	35	74	50	11	2	0	2	4

=== NHL coaching record ===
Team	Year	Regular season						Postseason
Team	Year	G	W	L	T	Pts	Division rank	Result
Pittsburgh Penguins	1988–89	80	40	33	7	87	2nd in Patrick	Lost in Division Finals
Pittsburgh Penguins	1989–90	26	10	14	2	22	5th in Patrick	(fired)
Total		106	50	47	9			

Preceded by Pierre Creamer	Head coach of the Pittsburgh Penguins; 1988–89	Succeeded by Craig Patrick
