= John Hynes (ice hockey) =

American ice hockey coach

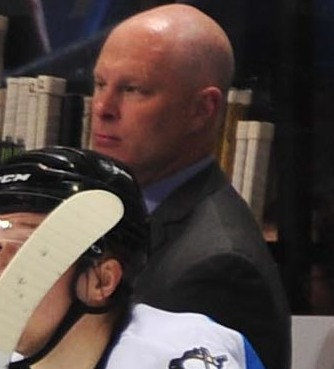
- Hynes coaching the Wilkes-Barre/Scranton Penguins in 2014
- Born: February 10, 1975 (age 51) Warwick, Rhode Island, U.S.
- Current NHL coach: Minnesota Wild
- Coached for: New Jersey Devils; Nashville Predators
- Coaching career: 2000–present

John Hynes (born February 10, 1975) is an American professional ice hockey coach who is the head coach for the Minnesota Wild of the National Hockey League (NHL). He previously served as head coach of the New Jersey Devils and Nashville Predators.

== Playing career ==
A 1997 graduate of Boston University, Hynes was a three-year letterman for the Terriers as a forward and participated in four straight NCAA Frozen Four tournaments. In 1995, Boston University captured the 1995 NCAA Division I national championship in front of Hynes' home crowd in Providence, Rhode Island. Hynes earned a bachelor's degree in health and physical education.

== Coaching career ==
=== College coaching career ===
Hynes was a former assistant coach at the University of Massachusetts Lowell during the 2000–01 season. In the 2002–03 season, he became an assistant coach for the University of Wisconsin.

=== USA Hockey ===
After the 2002–03 season, Hynes spent the next six seasons as a head coach with USA Hockey's National Team Development Program. He posted an overall record of 216–113–19–9 as the team's head coach. In 2008–09, he was the head coach of the United States under-17 development team, posting a 42–17–6 record.

Hynes also led the United States under-18 team to three medals at the World U18 Championships, gold in 2006, silver in 2004, and bronze in 2008. He was the head coach of the United States junior team at the 2008 World Junior Championships. He was an assistant coach of the United States team that won a gold medal at the 2004 World Junior Championships. Hynes was named head coach of the United States senior team at the 2024 World Championship where the team finished fifth and failed to win a medal for the third consecutive year after a 1–0 loss in the quarterfinals to hosts and eventual world champions, the Czech Republic senior team.

Hynes served as assistant coach of the United States at the 2026 Winter Olympics, where they won gold medals after defeating Canada 2–1 in overtime.

=== Wilkes-Barre/Scranton Penguins ===
On August 4, 2009, Hynes was named an assistant coach for the Wilkes-Barre/Scranton Penguins, by general manager Ray Shero. He served as an assistant under coach Todd Reirden. On July 31, 2010, the WBS Penguins announced that Hynes would be the team's new head coach after Reirden was promoted to an assistant coaching position for the Pittsburgh Penguins.

Under Hynes, the WBS Penguins qualified for the playoffs in all five seasons, reaching the conference finals twice.

=== New Jersey Devils ===
On June 2, 2015, Hynes was named as head coach of the New Jersey Devils of the National Hockey League (NHL), replacing Scott Stevens and Adam Oates. He became the youngest head coach in the NHL for the 2015–16 season. On April 5, 2018, Hynes coached the Devils to their first playoff appearance since the 2011–12 season. However, they lost in the First Round to the Tampa Bay Lightning in five games. On January 3, 2019, Hynes signed a multi-year contract extension with the Devils.

On December 3, 2019, Hynes was fired by the Devils and was replaced by assistant coach Alain Nasreddine.

=== Nashville Predators ===
On January 7, 2020, Hynes was named as head coach of the Nashville Predators, replacing Peter Laviolette. Hynes was fired on May 30, 2023, after parts of four seasons in Nashville.

=== Minnesota Wild ===
On November 27, 2023, Hynes was appointed head coach of the Minnesota Wild.

== Awards ==
AHL

- 2011 – Louis A. R. Pieri Memorial Award
- 2023 - Inducted into the Rhode Island Hockey Hall of Fame

Hynes was inducted into the Rhode Island Hockey Hall of Fame in 2023.

== Head coaching record ==
=== NHL ===
Team	Year	Regular season						Postseason			
Team	Year	G	W	L	OTL	Pts	Finish	W	L	Win%	Result
NJD	2015–16	82	38	36	8	84	7th in Metropolitan	—	—	—	Missed playoffs
NJD	2016–17	82	28	40	14	70	8th in Metropolitan	—	—	—	Missed playoffs
NJD	2017–18	82	44	29	9	97	5th in Metropolitan	1	4	.200	Lost in first round (TBL)
NJD	2018–19	82	31	41	10	72	8th in Metropolitan	—	—	—	Missed playoffs
NJD	2019–20	26	9	13	4	(22)	(fired)	—	—	—	—
NJD total		354	150	159	45			1	4	.200	1 playoff appearance
NSH	2019–20	28	16	11	1	33	5th in Central	1	3	.250	Lost in qualifying round (ARI)
NSH	2020–21	56	31	23	2	64	4th in Central	2	4	.333	Lost in first round (CAR)
NSH	2021–22	82	45	30	7	97	5th in Central	0	4	.000	Lost in first round (COL)
NSH	2022–23	82	42	32	8	92	5th in Central	—	—	—	Missed playoffs
NSH total		248	134	96	18			3	11	.214	3 playoff appearances
MIN	2023–24	63	34	24	5	(73)	6th in Central	—	—	—	Missed playoffs
MIN	2024–25	82	45	30	7	97	4th in Central	2	4	.333	Lost in first round (VGK)
MIN	2025–26	82	46	24	12	104	3rd in Central	5	6	.455	Lost in second round (COL)
MIN total		227	125	78	24			7	10	.412	2 playoff appearance
Total		829	409	333	87			11	25	.306	6 playoff appearances

=== AHL ===
Team	Year	Regular season						Postseason			
Team	Year	G	W	L	OTL	Pts	Finish	W	L	Win%	Result
WBS	2010–11	80	58	21	1	117	1st in East	6	6	.500	Lost in division finals (CHA)
WBS	2011–12	76	44	25	7	95	2nd in East	6	6	.500	Lost in conference semifinals (STJ)
WBS	2012–13	76	42	30	4	88	3rd in East	8	7	.533	Lost in conference finals (SYR)
WBS	2013–14	76	42	26	8	92	2nd in East	9	8	.529	Lost in conference finals (STJ)
WBS	2014–15	76	45	24	7	97	2nd in East	4	4	.500	Lost in conference semifinals (MCH)
Total		384	231	126	27			33	31	.516	5 playoff appearances

Sporting positions
Preceded by Todd Reirden	Head coach of the Wilkes-Barre/Scranton Penguins; 2010–2015	Succeeded by Mike Sullivan
Preceded by Adam Oates; Scott Stevens	Head coach of the New Jersey Devils; 2015–2019	Succeeded by Alain Nasreddine (interim)
Preceded by Peter Laviolette	Head coach of the Nashville Predators; 2020–2023	Succeeded by Andrew Brunette
Preceded by Dean Evason	Head coach of the Minnesota Wild; 2023–present	Incumbent
