= Peter Laviolette =

American ice hockey player and coach

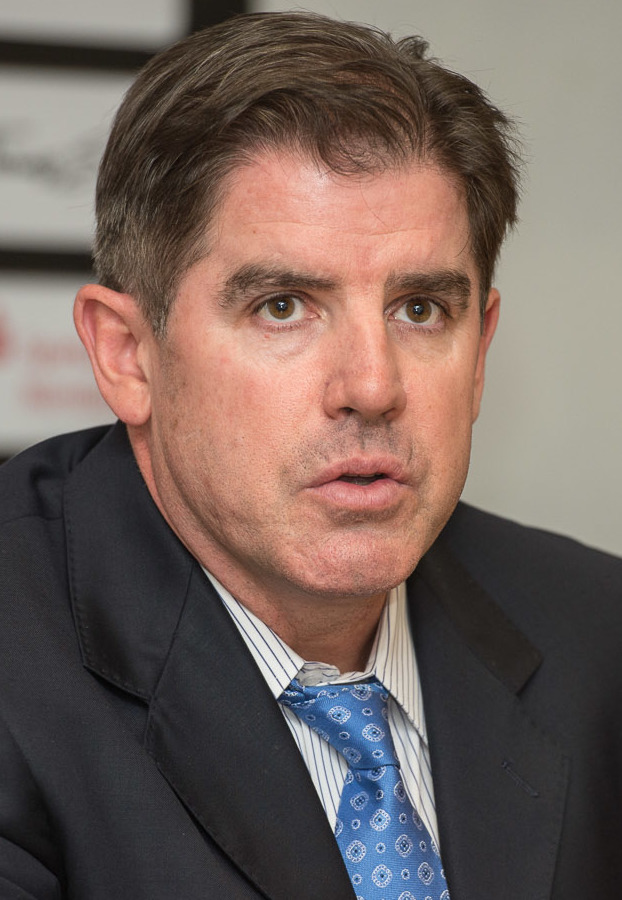
- Laviolette in 2014
- Born: December 7, 1964 (age 61) Franklin, Massachusetts, U.S.
- Height: 6 ft 2 in (188 cm)
- Weight: 200 lb (91 kg; 14 st 4 lb)
- Position: Defense
- Shot: Left
- Played for: New York Rangers
- Current NHL coach: Los Angeles Kings
- Coached for: New York Islanders; Carolina Hurricanes; Philadelphia Flyers; Nashville Predators; Washington Capitals; New York Rangers
- National team: United States
- NHL draft: Undrafted
- Playing career: 1986–1997
- Coaching career: 1997–present

Peter Philip Laviolette Jr. (born December 7, 1964) is an American professional ice hockey coach and former player who is the head coach for the Los Angeles Kings of the National Hockey League (NHL). Originally undrafted by teams in the NHL, he played a total of 12 games with the Rangers in the 1988–89 season. Following retirement from active play, Laviolette also served as head coach of the New York Islanders, Carolina Hurricanes, Philadelphia Flyers, Nashville Predators, and Washington Capitals. He led the Hurricanes to a Stanley Cup win in 2006, and later coached the Flyers to the Stanley Cup Final in 2010, as well as the Predators in 2017. Laviolette is the fourth coach in NHL history to lead three teams to the Stanley Cup Final.

On October 13, 2021, Laviolette won his 647th game as an NHL head coach, passing John Tortorella to become the winningest American-born head coach in league history. In February 2022, Laviolette became the 10th head coach in NHL history to record 700 wins, and in March 2024 he became the eighth coach to record 800 wins.

Laviolette was born in Franklin, Massachusetts, and attended Franklin High School, where he played baseball and ice hockey. He played college ice hockey at Westfield State College in Westfield, Massachusetts.

== Playing career ==
As a player, Laviolette spent the majority of his 10-year career playing for various minor league teams. He played 12 games in the NHL for the New York Rangers during the 1988–89 season, but failed to record a point. Laviolette also played for the United States in the Olympics twice (1988 and 1994).

== Coaching career ==
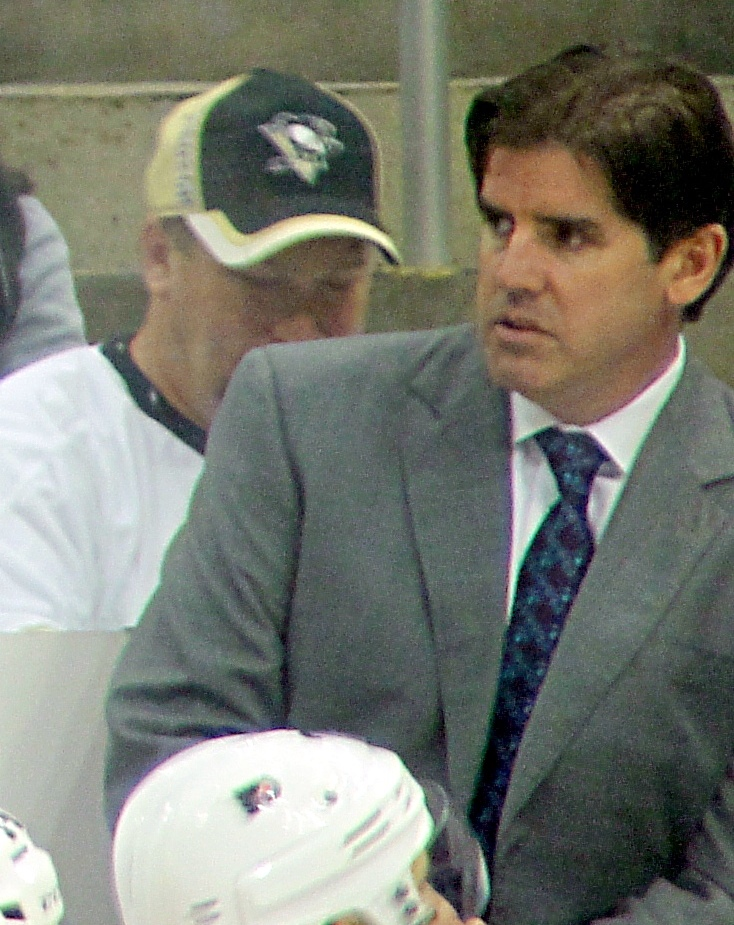
Laviolette coaching the Philadelphia Flyers in April 2012

He began his coaching career as head coach of the ECHL's Wheeling Nailers. In one season as coach, he led his team to a 37–24–9 record and a berth in the playoffs, wherein they lost in the third round. He left Wheeling to take over the head coaching job for the Providence Bruins of the American Hockey League (AHL). In 1998–99, he coached the team to a 56–15–4 regular-season record. In the playoffs, Providence won the AHL Calder Cup Championship with a 15–4 playoff record. Laviolette was named the AHL Coach of the Year.

Laviolette's success in the AHL earned him a stint as an assistant coach for the Boston Bruins. Having grown up in the Boston suburb of Franklin, Laviolette was disappointed when he did not get the head coaching job in Boston after that season so he left for the head coaching job on Long Island.

=== New York Islanders ===
He became head coach of the New York Islanders in 2001. After taking over the New York Islanders, which had missed the playoffs for seven years before his arrival, he led his team to the playoffs in both seasons he was there. His first season in New York, the Islanders earned 96 points (42–28–8–4 record), nearly winning the Atlantic Division before losing in the first round to the Toronto Maple Leafs in seven games. The Islanders snuck into the playoffs the following season and then lost in five games to the Ottawa Senators in the first round. On June 3, 2003, he was fired by general manager Mike Milbury.

=== Carolina Hurricanes ===
Laviolette came to the Carolina Hurricanes as head coach in the 2003–04 season, taking over following the firing of Paul Maurice. In his first season, he coached 52 games during a rebuilding year. Laviolette led the Hurricanes to an excellent regular season during his second year at the helm, winning the Southeast Division with 112 points (52–22–8 record). He also coached the U.S. Olympic men's hockey team at the 2006 Winter Olympics in Turin, Italy. The Hurricanes won their first Stanley Cup championship in franchise history during the 2006 playoffs, after winning two very close seven-game playoff series over the Buffalo Sabres and Edmonton Oilers. Laviolette was the fourth American-born coach to win it. He was also the runner-up for the Jack Adams Award for the NHL's Coach of the Year, which was awarded to Lindy Ruff in the closest vote ever recorded for this award, 155–154.

After winning their first Stanley Cup, Laviolette's Hurricanes suffered through an injury-plagued 2006–07 season that saw the team finish with a disappointing 40–34–8 record. The next season, the team once again got off to a poor start, but held first place in a weak division for most of the season, despite having a sub-.500 record until February. The team then got hot and built what was seen as a solid lead. However, the Washington Capitals got red hot in the final weeks, Carolina lost several games down the stretch, and Laviolette's group missed the post-season.

On November 7, 2008, following his 240th victory, Laviolette moved past John Tortorella to become the winningest American-born coach in the NHL. Tortorella later eclipsed this record in 2009, and after several years of being within a few wins of each other, Laviolette regained the lead in 2021 while coaching the Washington Capitals.

On December 3, 2008, Laviolette was fired as coach of the Hurricanes and replaced by his predecessor, Paul Maurice.

Laviolette worked on the panel for the TV network TSN.

=== Philadelphia Flyers ===
On December 4, 2009, Laviolette replaced John Stevens as the head coach of the Philadelphia Flyers. Barely making it into the playoffs thanks to a shootout victory over rival New York Rangers, Laviolette's Flyers became the third NHL team to come back from a 3–0 series deficit, defeating the Boston Bruins 4–3 in game seven to reach the 2010 Eastern Conference Final. On May 24, 2010, Laviolette led the Flyers to the Stanley Cup Final against the Chicago Blackhawks. The Flyers would lose the Finals in six games, with Chicago winning the Cup in overtime on June 9.

On April 1, 2012, in a game against the Pittsburgh Penguins, Laviolette jawed with the Penguins' head coach Dan Bylsma after Penguin Joe Vitale hit Flyer Daniel Brière late in the game. Laviolette swung a stick against the boards which broke in half, and continued to verbally go after Bylsma and assistant coach Tony Granato, an American teammate of Laviolette during the 1988 Winter Olympics.

The HBO series 24/7: Flyers/Rangers leading up to the 2012 Winter Classic gave fans rare access to the Flyers locker room, and many of Laviolette's quotes became popular catch-phrases, such as, "We need to start playing with some jam," and, "It's about as casual as it gets." Laviolette himself acknowledged the popularity of his "jam" catch-phrase by making a video for the Flyers 2012 Fan Appreciation Game thanking Philadelphia fans for "bringing more jam than any other city in sports." For the Flyers' game six Eastern Conference Quarter-final game against the Pittsburgh Penguins, the Flyers gave away orange shirts to all fans attending featuring an angry likeness of Laviolette and the phrase, "Time for some JAM!!"

After a 0–3 start of the 2013–14 season by the Flyers, Laviolette was fired on October 7, 2013. He was replaced by assistant coach Craig Berube.

=== Nashville Predators ===
On May 6, 2014, Laviolette was hired to become the head coach of the Nashville Predators, becoming the second head coach in the team's history. He replaced Barry Trotz, who served 15 years as head coach of the Predators and the only coach the franchise had seen. Laviolette and his Nashville staff were chosen to coach one of the teams in the 2015 NHL All-Star Game for having the highest points percentage in the NHL through January 8, 2015. Laviolette guided the Predators to a franchise record ninth consecutive home win with a 4–3 victory over the Toronto Maple Leafs on February 4, 2015. During the 2015-16 season, Laviolette guided the Predators to a new franchise record 14-game point streak. The team qualified for the Stanley Cup playoffs but lost to the San Jose Sharks in the second round.

In 2017, the Predators again qualified for the playoffs as the second wild card spot with 94 points. In the first round, the team swept the Chicago Blackhawks 4–0, marking the first time that an eighth seed swept a playoff series against the top seed in the conference in National Hockey League history. In the second round, the Predators defeated the St. Louis Blues in six games, marking the first time the team advanced to the Western Conference Finals. On May 16, the Predators beat the Anaheim Ducks in game three of the Western Conference Finals and became the first team in 20 years (since the Detroit Red Wings in 1997) to achieve 10 straight wins at home in the postseason. On May 22, 2017, Laviolette guided the Predators to the franchise's first Western Conference Championship by beating the Ducks 6–3 to move on to the Stanley Cup Final. After going down to the Pittsburgh Penguins 2–0, the Predators evened the series at 2, winning games 3 and 4 at home. Returning to Pittsburgh, the Predators lost 6–0 before being eliminated at home 2–0 in game six of the Stanley Cup Final on June 11, 2017.

Laviolette was fired by the Predators on January 6, 2020, with the team sitting in sixth place in the division at the time with a record of 19–15–7.

=== Washington Capitals ===
On September 15, 2020, Laviolette was named head coach of the Washington Capitals, replacing the recently fired Todd Reirden.

On April 14, 2023, Laviolette and the Capitals mutually agreed to part ways after the team missed the playoffs for the first time since the 2013–14 season and finished with a below-.500 win percentage.

=== New York Rangers ===
On June 13, 2023, the New York Rangers hired Laviolette as head coach, replacing Gerard Gallant. In his first year, Laviolette led the Rangers to a 55–23–4 record, winning the Presidents' Trophy, also becoming the first head coach in NHL history to guide six different teams to the Stanley Cup playoffs. The following season, the Rangers failed to qualify for the playoffs, and Laviolette was subsequently fired on April 19, 2025.

=== Los Angeles Kings ===
On June 9, 2026, Laviolette was named head coach of the Los Angeles Kings, replacing D. J. Smith.

=== International ===
On February 26, 2020, Laviolette was named head coach of the United States men's national team.

== Personal life ==
Laviolette and his wife Kristen have two sons and one daughter. Laviolette's oldest son, Peter Laviolette III, was recently hired as Assistant Coach of the Wheeling Nailers, on August 11, 2026. Laviolette III previously played for the Nailers, with whom Laviolette began his coaching career during which Laviolette III was born.

== Career statistics ==
=== Regular season and playoffs ===
			Regular season					Playoffs
Season	Team	League	GP	G	A	Pts	PIM	GP	G	A	Pts	PIM
1982–83	Westfield State College	NCAA III	26	3	7	10	14	—	—	—	—	—
1983–84	Westfield State College	NCAA III	25	15	14	29	52	—	—	—	—	—
1984–85	Westfield State College	NCAA III	23	13	15	28	22	—	—	—	—	—
1985–86	Westfield State College	NCAA III	19	12	8	20	44	—	—	—	—	—
1986–87	Indianapolis Checkers	IHL	72	10	20	30	146	5	0	1	1	12
1987–88	United States	Intl	54	4	20	24	82	—	—	—	—	—
1987–88	Colorado Rangers	IHL	19	2	5	7	27	9	3	5	8	7
1988–89	New York Rangers	NHL	12	0	0	0	6	—	—	—	—	—
1988–89	Denver Rangers	IHL	57	6	19	25	120	3	0	0	0	4
1989–90	Flint Spirits	IHL	62	6	18	24	82	4	0	0	0	4
1990–91	Binghamton Rangers	AHL	65	12	24	36	72	10	2	7	9	30
1991–92	Binghamton Rangers	AHL	50	4	10	14	50	11	2	7	9	9
1992–93	Providence Bruins	AHL	74	13	42	55	64	6	0	4	4	10
1993–94	United States	Intl	56	10	25	35	63	—	—	—	—	—
1993–94	San Diego Gulls	IHL	17	3	4	7	20	9	3	0	3	6
1994–95	Providence Bruins	AHL	65	7	23	30	84	13	2	8	10	17
1995–96	Providence Bruins	AHL	72	9	17	26	53	4	1	1	2	8
1996–97	Providence Bruins	AHL	41	6	8	14	40	—	—	—	—	—
IHL totals			227	27	66	93	395	30	6	6	12	33
NHL totals			12	0	0	0	6	—	—	—	—	—
AHL totals			367	51	124	175	363	44	7	27	34	74

=== International ===
Year	Team	Event	GP	G	A	Pts	PIM
1988	United States	OG	6	0	2	2	4
1994	United States	OG	8	1	0	1	6
Senior totals			14	1	2	3	10

== Head coaching record ==
Team	Year	Regular season							Postseason			
Team	Year	G	W	L	T	OTL	Pts	Finish	W	L	Win %	Result
NYI	2001–02	82	42	28	8	4	96	2nd in Atlantic	3	4	.429	Lost in conference quarterfinals (TOR)
NYI	2002–03	82	35	34	11	2	83	3rd in Atlantic	1	4	.200	Lost in conference quarterfinals (OTT)
NYI total		164	77	62	19	6			4	8	.333	
CAR	2003–04	52	20	22	6	4	(50)	3rd in Southeast	—	—	—	Missed playoffs
CAR	2005–06	82	52	22	—	8	112	1st in Southeast	16	9	.640	Won Stanley Cup (EDM)
CAR	2006–07	82	40	34	—	8	88	3rd in Southeast	—	—	—	Missed playoffs
CAR	2007–08	82	43	33	—	6	92	2nd in Southeast	—	—	—	Missed playoffs
CAR	2008–09	25	12	11	—	2	(26)	(fired)	—	—	—	—
CAR total		323	167	122	6	28			16	9	.640	
PHI	2009–10	57	28	24	—	5	(61)	3rd in Atlantic	14	9	.609	Lost in Stanley Cup Final (CHI)
PHI	2010–11	82	47	23	—	12	106	1st in Atlantic	4	7	.364	Lost in conference semifinals (BOS)
PHI	2011–12	82	47	26	—	9	103	3rd in Atlantic	5	6	.500	Lost in conference semifinals (NJD)
PHI	2012–13	48	23	22	—	3	49	4th in Atlantic	—	—	—	Missed playoffs
PHI	2013–14	3	0	3	—	0	0	(fired)	—	—	—	—
PHI total		272	145	98	—	29			23	22	.511	
NSH	2014–15	82	47	25	—	10	104	2nd in Central	2	4	.333	Lost in first round (CHI)
NSH	2015–16	82	41	27	—	14	96	4th in Central	7	7	.500	Lost in second round (SJS)
NSH	2016–17	82	41	29	—	12	94	4th in Central	14	8	.636	Lost in Stanley Cup Final (PIT)
NSH	2017–18	82	53	18	—	11	117	1st in Central	7	6	.538	Lost in second round (WPG)
NSH	2018–19	82	47	29	—	6	100	1st in Central	2	4	.333	Lost in first round (DAL)
NSH	2019–20	41	19	15	—	7	45	(fired)	—	—	—	—
NSH total		451	248	143	—	60			32	29	.525	
WSH	2020–21	56	36	15	—	5	77	2nd in East	1	4	.200	Lost in first round (BOS)
WSH	2021–22	82	44	26	—	12	100	4th in Metropolitan	2	4	.333	Lost in first round (FLA)
WSH	2022–23	82	35	37	—	10	80	6th in Metropolitan	—	—	—	Missed playoffs
WSH total		220	115	78	—	27			3	8	.273	
NYR	2023–24	82	55	23	—	4	114	1st in Metropolitan	10	6	.625	Lost in conference finals (FLA)
NYR	2024–25	82	39	36	—	7	85	5th in Metropolitan	—	—	—	Missed playoffs
NYR total		164	94	59	—	11			10	6	.625	
Total		1,594	846	562	25	161			88	82	.518	1 Stanley Cup 14 playoff appearances

== Awards and honors ==
Award	Year	Ref
ECHL
ECHL Alumnus of the Month (February)	2001–02	
AHL
Louis A. R. Pieri Memorial Award	1998–99	
All-Star Classic	1999–2000	
NHL
Stanley Cup champion	2006	
NHL All-Star Game	2011, 2015, 2018, 2024	
International
World Championship bronze medal	2004	

Sporting positions
Preceded by Tom McVie	Head coach of the Providence Bruins; 1998–2000	Succeeded by Bill Armstrong
Preceded by Lorne Henning	Head coach of the New York Islanders; 2001–2003	Succeeded by Steve Stirling
Preceded by Paul Maurice	Head coach of the Carolina Hurricanes; 2003–2008	Succeeded by Paul Maurice
Preceded by John Stevens	Head coach of the Philadelphia Flyers; 2009–2013	Succeeded by Craig Berube
Preceded by Barry Trotz	Head coach of the Nashville Predators; 2014–2020	Succeeded by John Hynes
Preceded by Todd Reirden	Head coach of the Washington Capitals; 2020–2023	Succeeded by Spencer Carbery
Preceded by Gerard Gallant	Head coach of the New York Rangers; 2023–2025	Succeeded by Mike Sullivan
Preceded by D. J. Smith (interim)	Head coach of the Los Angeles Kings; 2026–present	Incumbent
