= List of Seattle Kraken head coaches =

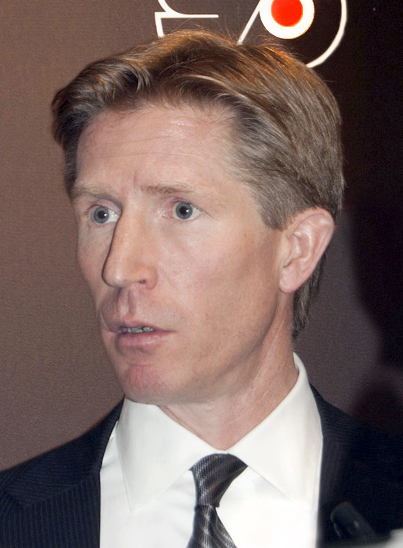
Dave Hakstol was the Kraken's inaugural head coach.

The Seattle Kraken are a professional ice hockey team based in Seattle. They are members of the Pacific Division of the National Hockey League (NHL). The team was founded after the NHL approved a proposal by Seattle Hockey Partners to grant an expansion franchise to the city of Seattle, and began play during the league's 2021–22 season.

The team's first head coach, Dave Hakstol, was hired on June 24, 2021. The Kraken's first season was very poor; the team finished eighth in their division due to only having 60 points, not enough to qualify for the playoffs. During the 2022–23 season, the Kraken achieved a record of 46–28–8 and 100 points, which was good for fourth place in the Pacific Division and the first playoff wild card spot in the Western Conference. This turnaround from the previous season led Hakstol to be a finalist for the NHL's coaching prize, the Jack Adams Award. During that season's playoffs, the Kraken faced off against the Colorado Avalanche in the first round. They upset the Avalanche in seven games, becoming the first team to win their inaugural playoff series against the defending Stanley Cup champion. However, they lost to the Dallas Stars in the second round, ending their sophomore season. At the NHL Awards ceremony on June 27, 2023, it was announced Jim Montgomery, head coach of the Boston Bruins, won the Jack Adams Trophy.

The next season, the Kraken struggled offensively, ranking 29th in the league in goals, with only 217. Following the season, Hakstol was fired. He was subsequently replaced by Dan Bylsma, who had previously served as head coach of the Kraken's American Hockey League (AHL) affiliate, the Coachella Valley Firebirds. However, after another difficult season that saw the Kraken finish sixth in the Pacific, Bylsma was fired one year into his tenure; he was subsequently replaced by Lane Lambert in May 2025.

== Key ==
#	Number
GC	Games coached
W	Wins (2 points)
L	Losses (0 points)
OT	Overtime/shootout losses (1 point)
Pts	Standings points
Win%	Percentage of games won

== Coaches ==
Statistics reflect time with the Kraken only. Statistics complete as of the firing of Bylsma after the 2025–26 season.

List of Seattle Kraken head coaches
#	Name	Term	Regular season						Playoffs				Championships/awards won	Ref.
#	Name	Term	GC	W	L	OT	Pts	Win%	GC	W	L	Win%	Championships/awards won	Ref.
1	Dave Hakstol	2021–2024	246	107	112	27	241	.490	14	7	7	.500		
2	Dan Bylsma	2024–2025	82	35	41	6	76	.463	—	—	—	—		
3	Lane Lambert	2025–present	82	34	37	11	79	.482	—	—	—	—		
