= Todd Reirden =

American ice hockey player and coach (born 1971)

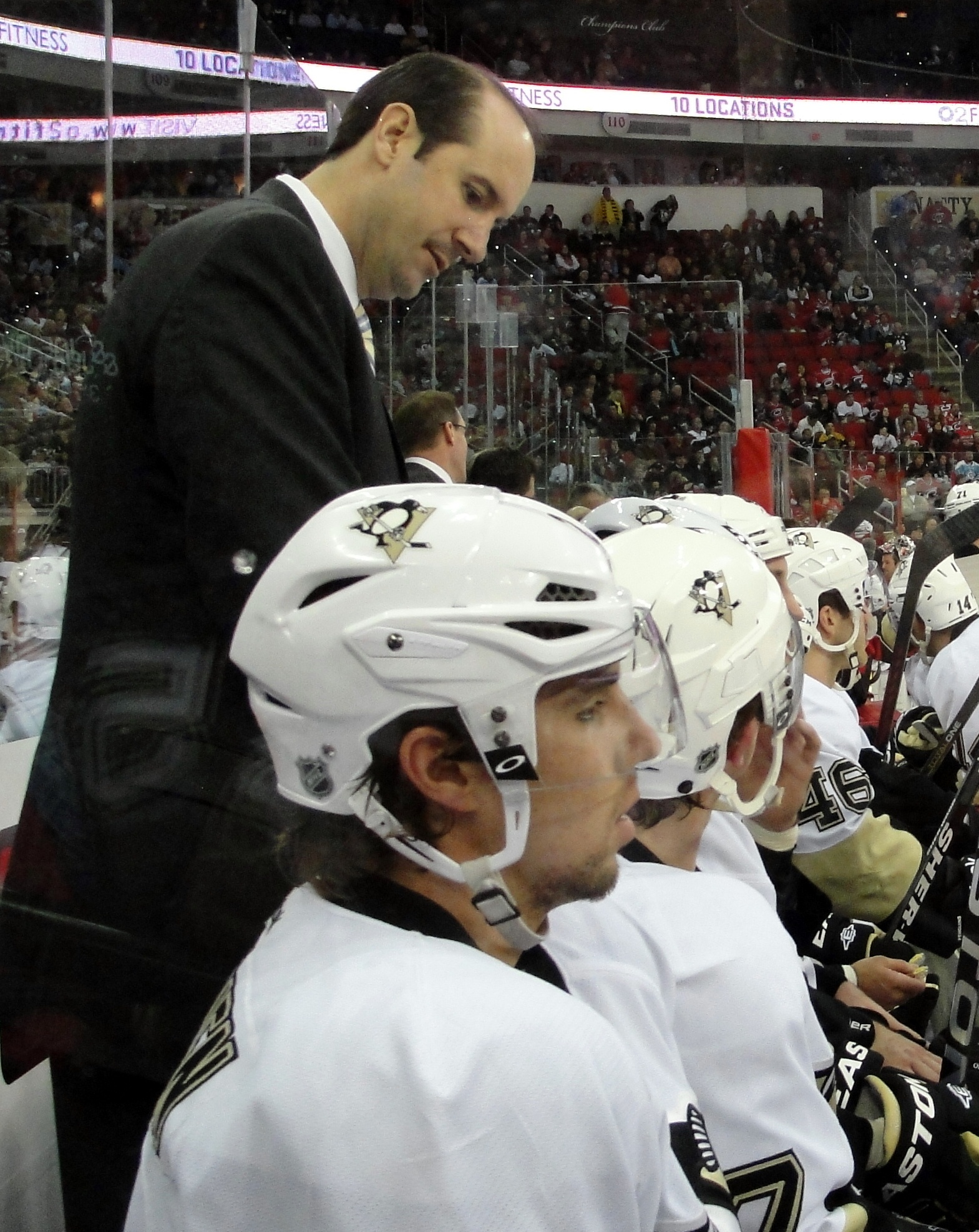
- Reirden with the Penguins in November 2011
- Born: June 25, 1971 (age 55) Deerfield, Illinois, U.S.
- Height: 6 ft 5 in (196 cm)
- Weight: 215 lb (98 kg; 15 st 5 lb)
- Position: Defense
- Shot: Left
- Played for: Edmonton Oilers; St. Louis Blues; Atlanta Thrashers; Phoenix Coyotes; DEG Metro Stars
- Current NHL coach: Philadelphia Flyers (assistant)
- Coached for: Washington Capitals
- NHL draft: 242nd overall, 1990; New Jersey Devils
- Playing career: 1994–2007
- Coaching career: 2007–present

Todd R. Reirden (born June 25, 1971) is an American professional ice hockey coach and former player. He is an assistant coach for the Philadelphia Flyers of the National Hockey League (NHL). He previously held head coaching positions for the Washington Capitals in the NHL and the Wilkes-Barre/Scranton Penguins in the American Hockey League (AHL). Reirden played in the NHL for the St. Louis Blues, Phoenix Coyotes, Atlanta Thrashers, and Edmonton Oilers.

== Playing career ==
As a youth, Reirden played in the 1984 Quebec International Pee-Wee Hockey Tournament with the Chicago Young Americans minor ice hockey team.

Reirden was drafted by the New Jersey Devils in the 12th round, 242nd overall in the 1990 NHL entry draft. After being drafted, Reirden went to Bowling Green State University where he played for four years. From there he played in the ECHL and IHL for a number of years before finally getting the call up to the NHL with the Edmonton Oilers for part of the 1998–99 season. Following his brief stint with the Oilers, Reirden signed as a free agent with the St. Louis Blues and had his most successful season in the NHL during the 1999–2000 season, scoring 25 points. The following year Reirden was hurt for most of the year and played only 38 games with the Blues. Reirden then played the 2001–02 season with the Atlanta Thrashers. He played his last tour in the NHL with the Phoenix Coyotes during the 2003–04 season, playing in 7 games.

In the 2005–06 season, Reirden played for the DEG Metro Stars of the Deutsche Eishockey Liga in Germany and his last season as a player was split between EC Graz of the Austrian Hockey League and SønderjyskE Ishockey in Denmark's Superisligaen.

== Coaching career ==
Reirden's first coaching job was as an assistant coach for the Bowling Green Falcons during the 2007–08 season.

On July 31, 2010, Reirden was named assistant coach of the Pittsburgh Penguins, joining fellow assistant coach Tony Granato on the bench. He replaced Mike Yeo, who left the organization to become the head coach for the Houston Aeros of the American Hockey League (AHL).

On June 25, 2014, the Penguins announced that Reirden and Granato had been relieved of their duties. On June 26, Reirden was hired by the Washington Capitals as an assistant coach. On June 29, 2018, Reirden became the head coach of the Capitals, replacing Barry Trotz who, after winning the Stanley Cup with the Capitals, left the team due to a contract dispute. In his first season as head coach of the Capitals, he guided them to a 48–26–8 record and the top record in the NHL's Metropolitan Division, but they lost in the First Round of the playoffs to the Carolina Hurricanes in seven games. After the Capitals again lost in the first round of the 2020 Stanley Cup Playoffs, the Capitals fired Reirden on August 23, 2020. A week later, he was hired as an assistant coach by his former team, the Pittsburgh Penguins. Pittsburgh released Reirden in May 2024.

On June 20, 2025, Reirden was hired to be an assistant coach with the Philadelphia Flyers.

== Career statistics ==
			Regular season					Playoffs
Season	Team	League	GP	G	A	Pts	PIM	GP	G	A	Pts	PIM
1990–91	Bowling Green State University	CCHA	28	1	5	6	22	—	—	—	—	—
1991–92	Bowling Green State University	CCHA	33	8	7	15	34	—	—	—	—	—
1992–93	Bowling Green State University	CCHA	41	8	17	25	48	—	—	—	—	—
1993–94	Bowling Green State University	CCHA	38	7	23	30	56	—	—	—	—	—
1994–95	Tallahassee Tiger Sharks	ECHL	43	5	25	30	61	13	2	5	7	10
1994–95	Albany River Rats	AHL	2	0	1	1	2	—	—	—	—	—
1994–95	Raleigh Icecaps	ECHL	26	2	13	15	33	—	—	—	—	—
1995–96	Tallahassee Tiger Sharks	ECHL	7	1	3	4	10	—	—	—	—	—
1995–96	Chicago Wolves	IHL	31	0	2	2	39	9	0	2	2	16
1995–96	Jacksonville Lizard Kings	ECHL	15	1	10	11	41	1	0	2	2	4
1996–97	Chicago Wolves	IHL	57	3	10	13	108	—	—	—	—	—
1996–97	San Antonio Dragons	IHL	23	2	5	7	51	9	0	1	1	17
1997–98	San Antonio Dragons	IHL	70	5	14	19	132	—	—	—	—	—
1997–98	Fort Wayne Komets	IHL	11	2	2	4	16	4	0	2	2	4
1998–99	Edmonton Oilers	NHL	17	2	3	5	20	—	—	—	—	—
1998–99	Hamilton Bulldogs	AHL	58	9	25	34	84	11	0	5	5	6
1999–00	St. Louis Blues	NHL	56	4	21	25	32	4	0	1	1	0
2000–01	St. Louis Blues	NHL	38	2	4	6	43	1	0	0	0	0
2000–01	Worcester IceCats	AHL	7	2	6	8	20	—	—	—	—	—
2001–02	Atlanta Thrashers	NHL	65	3	5	8	82	—	—	—	—	—
2002–03	Cincinnati Mighty Ducks	AHL	58	7	13	20	97	—	—	—	—	—
2003–04	Cincinnati Mighty Ducks	AHL	39	3	8	11	42	—	—	—	—	—
2003–04	Springfield Falcons	AHL	34	6	7	13	42	—	—	—	—	—
2003–04	Phoenix Coyotes	NHL	7	0	2	2	4	—	—	—	—	—
2004–05	Houston Aeros	AHL	52	3	5	8	56	5	0	0	0	6
2005–06	DEG Metro Stars	DEL	37	4	13	17	72	14	0	4	4	10
2006–07	EC Graz	EBEL	15	2	6	8	24	—	—	—	—	—
NHL totals			183	11	56	67	181	5	0	1	1	0

== Head coaching record ==
Team	Year	Regular season						Postseason			
Team	Year	G	W	L	OTL	Pts	Finish	W	L	Win%	Result
WSH	2018–19	82	48	23	8	104	1st in Metropolitan	3	4	.429	Lost in first round (CAR)
WSH	2019–20	69	41	20	8	90	1st in Metropolitan	2	6	.250	Lost in first round (NYI)
Total		151	89	46	16			5	10	.333	2 playoff appearances

Preceded by Dan Bylsma	Head Coach of the Wilkes-Barre/Scranton Penguins; 2009–10	Succeeded by John Hynes
Preceded by Barry Trotz	Head coach of the Washington Capitals; 2018–20	Succeeded by Peter Laviolette
