= List of Pittsburgh Penguins head coaches =

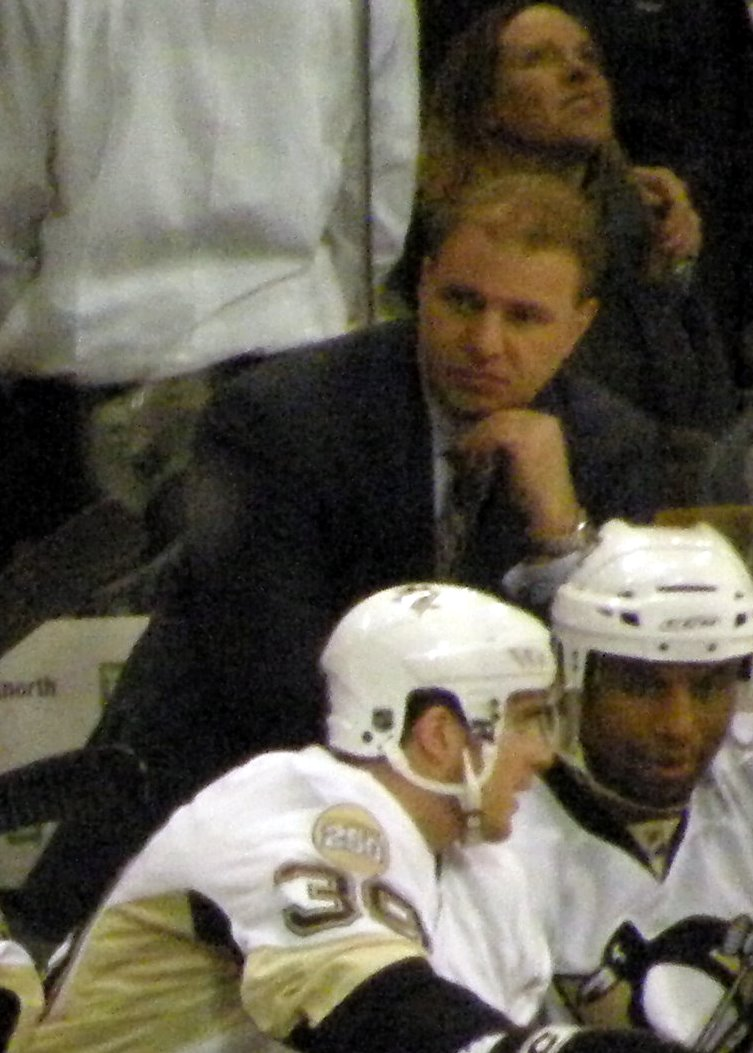
Michel Therrien was the Penguins' head coach from 2005 to 2009.

The Pittsburgh Penguins are an American professional ice hockey team based in Pittsburgh, Pennsylvania. They play in the Metropolitan Division of the Eastern Conference in the National Hockey League (NHL). The franchise was established as one of six new franchises of the 1967 NHL expansion. Since their foundation, the Penguins had played their home games at the Civic Arena, which was replaced by the Consol Energy Center in 2010. The franchise is co-owned by Ronald Burkle and Mario Lemieux—the only player/owner in the NHL's modern era. According to Forbes, the Penguins were the 11th most valuable NHL franchise, at US$222 million, in 2009.

There have been 23 head coaches for the Penguins franchise. The franchise's first head coach was Red Sullivan, former New York Rangers captain and coach. Sullivan was replaced by future Hockey Hall of Fame inductee Red Kelly, after two seasons. Kelly was inducted into the Hall of Fame as a player, and head coaches Craig Patrick, Bob Johnson, Scotty Bowman, and Herb Brooks were inducted as builders. Bob Johnson led the Penguins to their first Stanley Cup victory in 1991, but was forced to retire due to health problems after the season—he died later that year. Bowman succeeded Johnson and coached the team to its second Stanley Cup victory the following season. Michel Therrien won the Prince of Wales Trophy, as Eastern Conference champion, during the 2007–08 season. Therrien was replaced the following season by Dan Bylsma. Bylsma would lead the Penguins to their third Stanley Cup championship that same season. Bylsma was fired after the 2013–14 season and replaced by Mike Johnston. Johnston was fired during the 2015–16 season and replaced by Mike Sullivan, who led the Penguins to consecutive Stanley Cup championships in 2016 and 2017 and leads the team in games coached. Sullivan ultimately departed the Penguins on April 28, 2025, following three consecutive seasons without a playoff appearance. Dan Muse was hired on June 4, 2025, succeeding Sullivan.

== Key ==
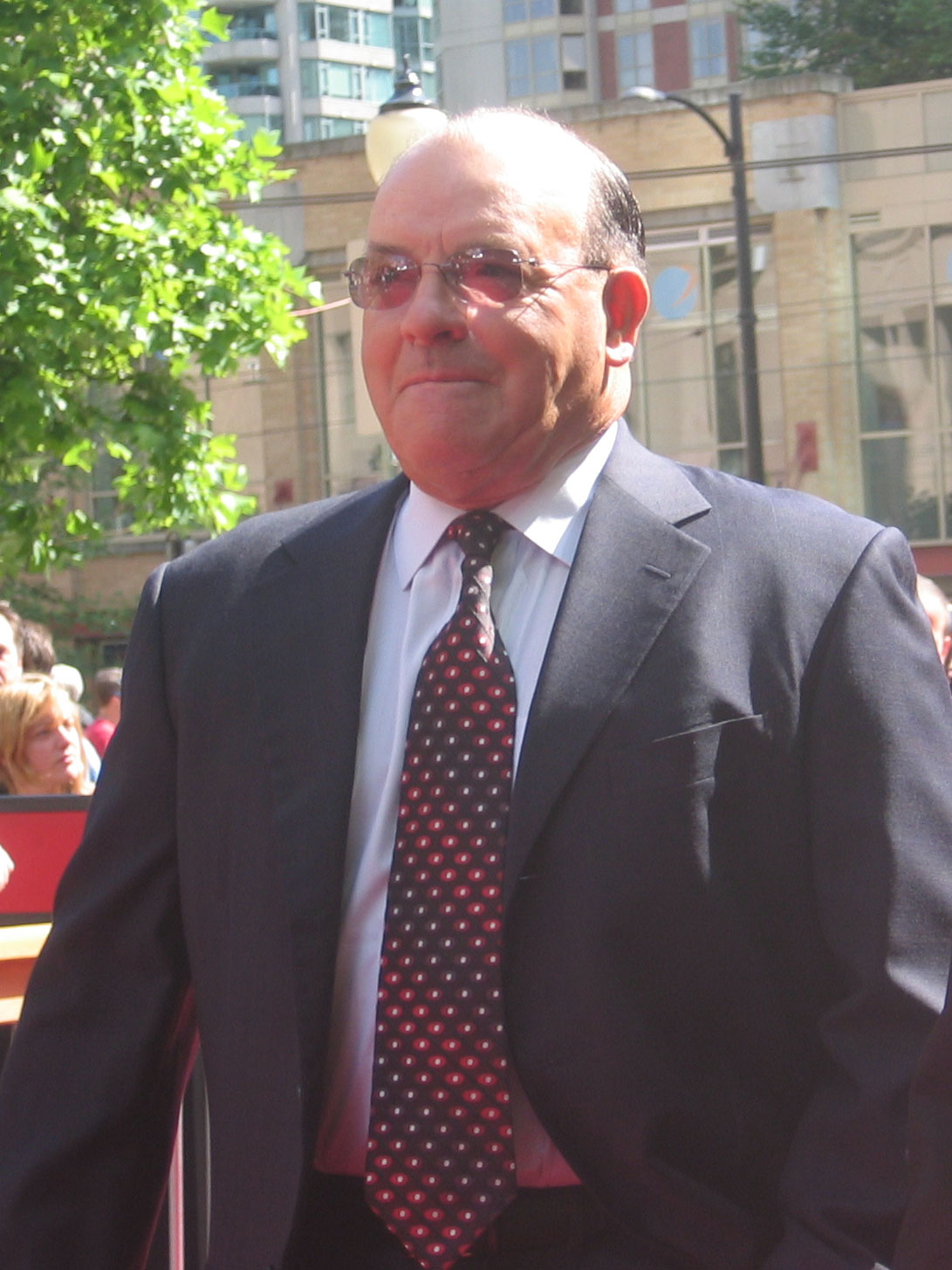
Scotty Bowman was the Penguins' head coach from 1991 to 1993

| # | Number of coaches |
| Term | Years spent as coach |
| Games | Games coached |
| W | Wins |
| L | Losses |
| T | Ties |
| OTL | Overtime/shootout losses^{[a]} |
| Win% | Winning percentage |
| PG | Playoff games coached |
| PW | Playoff wins |
| PL | Playoff losses |
| PWin% | Playoff winning percentage |
| * | Spent entire NHL head coaching career with the Penguins |
| * or † | Elected to the Hockey Hall of Fame († denotes induction as a builder, * denotes induction as a player) |

== Coaches ==
Note: Statistics are correct through the 2025–26 season.

| # | Name^{[b]} | Term^{[c]} | Games | W | L | T | OTL | Win% | PG | PW | PL | PWin% | Achievements | Ref |
|---|---|---|---|---|---|---|---|---|---|---|---|---|---|---|
| 1 | George "Red" Sullivan | 1967–1969 | 150 | 47 | 79 | 24 | — | .393 | — | — | — | — | | |
| 2 | Red Kelly* | 1969–1973 | 274 | 90 | 132 | 52 | — | .423 | 14 | 6 | 8 | .429 | | |
| 3 | Ken Schinkel | 1973–1974, 1976–1977 | 203 | 83 | 92 | 28 | — | .478 | — | — | — | — | | |
| 4 | Marc Boileau | 1974–1976 | 151 | 66 | 61 | 24 | — | .517 | 9 | 5 | 4 | .555 | | |
| 5 | Johnny Wilson | 1977–1980 | 240 | 91 | 105 | 44 | — | .471 | 12 | 4 | 8 | .333 | | |
| 6 | Eddie Johnston | 1980–1983, 1993–1997 | 516 | 232 | 224 | 60 | — | .508 | 46 | 22 | 24 | .478 | | |
| 7 | Lou Angotti | 1983–1984 | 80 | 16 | 58 | 6 | — | .232 | — | — | — | — | | |
| 8 | Bob Berry | 1984–1987 | 240 | 88 | 127 | 25 | — | .419 | — | — | — | — | | |
| 9 | Pierre Creamer | 1987–1988 | 80 | 36 | 35 | 9 | — | .506 | — | — | — | — | | |
| 10 | Gene Ubriaco | 1988–1989 | 106 | 50 | 47 | 9 | — | .514 | 11 | 7 | 4 | .636 | | |
| 11 | Craig Patrick† | 1989–1990,^{[d]} 1997^{[e]} | 74 | 29 | 36 | 9 | — | .453 | 5 | 1 | 4 | .200 | | |
| 12 | Bob Johnson† | 1990–1991 | 80 | 41 | 33 | 6 | — | .550 | 24 | 16 | 8 | .667 | Stanley Cup champions (1991) | |
| 13 | Scotty Bowman | 1991–1993 | 164 | 95 | 53 | 16 | — | .628 | 33 | 23 | 10 | .696 | Presidents' Trophy (1993); Stanley Cup champions (1992) | |
| 14 | Kevin Constantine | 1997–1999 | 189 | 86 | 67 | 35 | 4 | .511 | 19 | 8 | 11 | .421 | | |
| 15 | Herb Brooks† | 1999–2000 | 57 | 29 | 24 | 5 | 2 | .570 | 11 | 6 | 5 | .545 | | |
| 16 | Ivan Hlinka† | 2000–2001 | 86 | 42 | 32 | 9 | 3 | .558 | 18 | 9 | 9 | .500 | | |
| 17 | Rick Kehoe | 2001–2003 | 160 | 55 | 81 | 14 | 10 | .419 | — | — | — | — | | |
| 18 | Ed Olczyk | 2003–2005 | 113 | 31 | 64 | 14 | 4 | .274 | — | — | — | — | | |
| 19 | Michel Therrien | 2005–2009^{[f]} | 272 | 135 | 105 | — | 32 | .502 | 25 | 15 | 10 | .600 | Prince of Wales Trophy (2008) | |
| 20 | Dan Bylsma | 2009–2014 | 401 | 252 | 117 | — | 32 | .670 | 78 | 43 | 35 | .551 | Stanley Cup champions (2009); Jack Adams Award (2011) | |
| 21 | Mike Johnston | 2014–2015^{[g]} | 110 | 58 | 37 | — | 15 | .595 | 5 | 1 | 4 | .200 | | |
| 22 | Mike Sullivan | 2015–2025 | 753 | 409 | 255 | — | 89 | .602 | 82 | 44 | 38 | .537 | Stanley Cup champions (2016, 2017) | |
| 23 | Dan Muse | 2025–present | 82 | 41 | 25 | — | 16 | .598 | 6 | 2 | 4 | .333 | | |

== Notes ==
- ^{a} Beginning with the 2005–06 season, the NHL instituted a shootout for regular season games that remained tied after a five-minute overtime period, which prevented ties.
- ^{b} Head coaches with multiple terms are counted once; figures are career totals. For a specific order of the coaches see the Footnotes section.
- ^{c} Each year is linked to an article about that particular NHL season.
- ^{d} Gene Ubriaco served as the Penguins' head coach to begin the 1989–90 season; the team began with a 10–14–2 record. On December 5, 1989, Craig Patrick replaced Ubriaco as an interim head coach. Under Patrick, the team went 22–26–6 and did not qualify for the playoffs.
- ^{e} After starting the 1996–97 season with a record of 31–26–5, the Penguins went 1–8 in nine consecutive games in February and March 1997. Coach Eddie Johnston was replaced by Craig Patrick, under whom the team finished the season 7–10–3 and lost in the first round of the playoffs four games to one.
- ^{f} Michel Therrien coached the Penguins to a 27–25–5 record to start the 2008–09 season, at which point he was replaced by Dan Bylsma.
- ^{g} Mike Johnston coached the Penguins to a 15–10–3 record to start the 2015–16 season, at which point he was replaced by Mike Sullivan.
