= Dan Bylsma =

American ice hockey player and coach (born 1970)

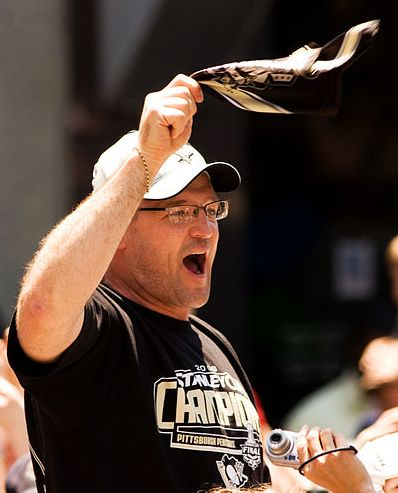
- Bylsma in 2009
- Born: September 19, 1970 (age 56) Grand Haven, Michigan, U.S.
- Height: 6 ft 2 in (188 cm)
- Weight: 215 lb (98 kg; 15 st 5 lb)
- Position: Right wing
- Shot: Left
- Played for: Los Angeles Kings; Mighty Ducks of Anaheim
- Coached for: Pittsburgh Penguins; Buffalo Sabres; Seattle Kraken
- NHL draft: 109th overall, 1989; Winnipeg Jets
- Playing career: 1992–2004
- Coaching career: 2004–present

Daniel Brian Bylsma (/ˈbaɪlzmə/; born September 19, 1970) is an American professional ice hockey coach and former player. He was previously head coach of the Pittsburgh Penguins, Buffalo Sabres, and Seattle Kraken in the National Hockey League (NHL), as well as an assistant coach for the Detroit Red Wings, and head coach of the Wilkes-Barre/Scranton Penguins and Coachella Valley Firebirds of the American Hockey League (AHL). He also was the former head coach of the United States men's national ice hockey team. Bylsma won the Stanley Cup with the Penguins in 2009, just four months after being promoted to Pittsburgh's head coaching position.

Prior to coaching, he played as a forward in the NHL with the Los Angeles Kings and Mighty Ducks of Anaheim. He was drafted in the sixth round (109th overall) of the 1989 NHL entry draft, by the Winnipeg Jets.

== Early life ==
During his high school days, Bylsma was a standout in many sports, including golf, baseball, and ice hockey. Bylsma graduated from Western Michigan Christian High School where he won the Class D golf individual championship as a freshman. He also played baseball and was the starting left fielder as a freshman on Christian's 1985 State championship team. In his senior year, he was a member of the all-state all-class "Dream Team" (the best player at each position in the state – all classes), and won many regional baseball honors.

Bylsma played amateur hockey in Muskegon Junior Hockey, Norton Shores Recreational Leagues, and Grand Rapids GRAHA before playing Junior "B" hockey in Canada for the St. Marys Lincolns and the Oakville Blades of the Ontario Hockey Association. Bylsma went on to play college hockey at Bowling Green State University from 1988–1992 and was drafted by the Winnipeg Jets in his freshman year. He was twice selected to the Central Collegiate Hockey Association All Academic Team and once earned Honorable Mention. He was a Bowling Green Scholar Athlete all four years and won the Jack Gregory Award for the highest grade point average on the team in his Sophomore season and the Howard Brown Coaches' Award for excellence in his senior year. Bylsma is one of the few players in the CCHA to have scored a shorthanded goal while his team was two men short.

== Professional playing career ==
Despite being drafted by the Winnipeg Jets, Bylsma never played a game for them, and was signed by the Los Angeles Kings in the summer of 1994. During the 1994–95 labor stoppage, Bylsma earned the nickname "Disco Dan". The nickname was adopted by teammates while playing for a minor league team in Phoenix. Veteran goaltender Byron Dafoe already went by Bylsma's former moniker of "Bysie" so the name "Disco Dan" was given due to Bylsma's penchant for dancing in the locker room.

He played parts of five seasons for the Kings, acting as a defensive forward. In his first season, when he played only four games for the Kings, he was captain of their International Hockey League (IHL) affiliate, the Phoenix Roadrunners. He also played for the Long Beach Ice Dogs, who were the Kings' IHL affiliate after the Roadrunners folded in 1997. Bylsma played 95 American Hockey League (AHL) games with the Cincinnati Mighty Ducks, the Lowell Lock Monsters, the Springfield Falcons, the Albany River Rats, the Moncton Hawks and the Rochester Americans, and reached the Calder Cup Finals in 1994.

Signed as a free agent by the Mighty Ducks of Anaheim in the summer of 2000, Bylsma was a steadying influence on a rebuilding Anaheim team, and was made an alternate captain. In his second season, he set a career high in points (17).

Bylsma struggled his entire career to stay in the NHL, mostly due to a lack of natural offensive ability (his primary role in the NHL had always been penalty killing). Injuries took a toll in later years, and before being put on waivers in January 2004, Bylsma missed 31 games due to knee surgery. He retired from playing following the 2003–04 season.

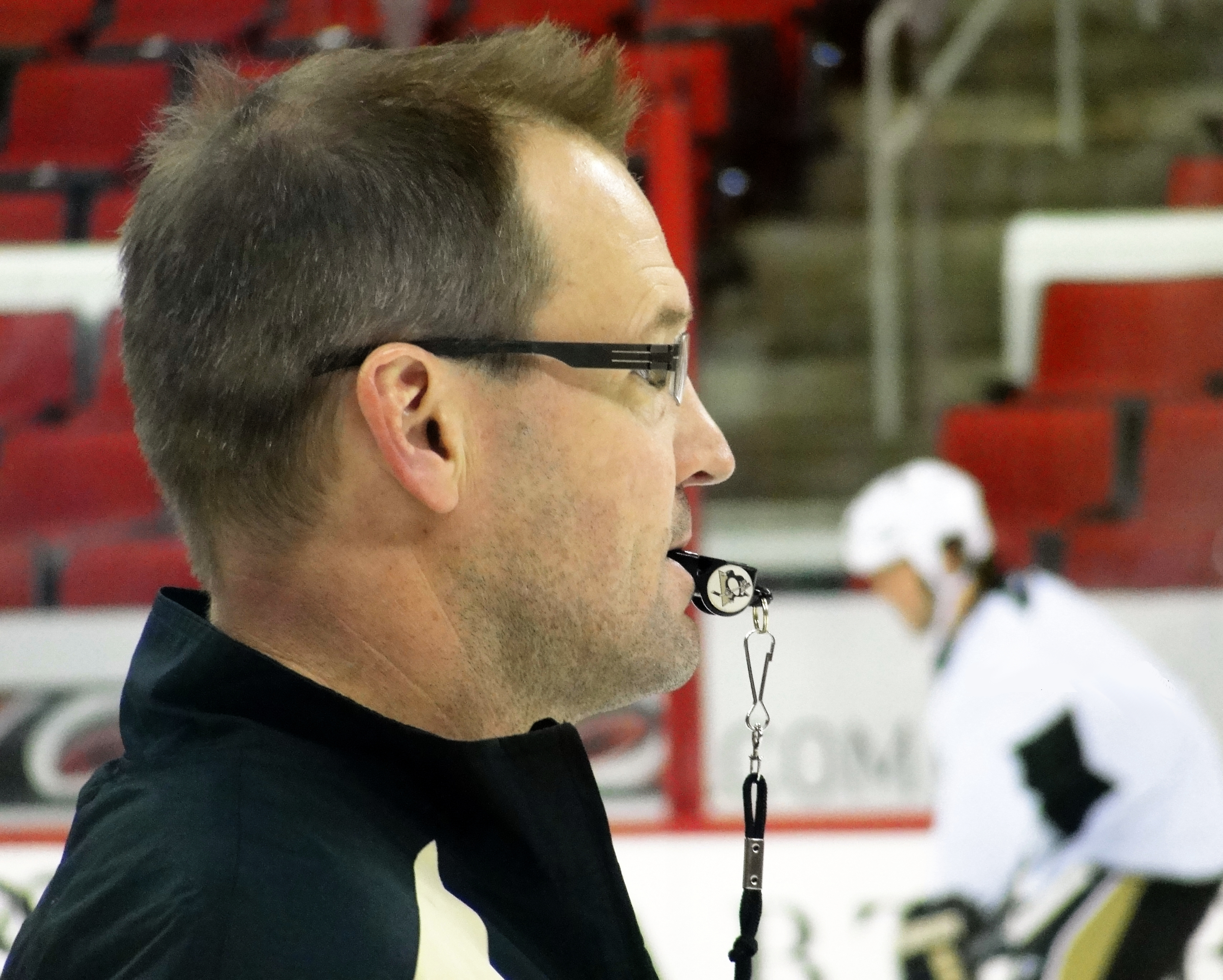
Head Coach Dan Bylsma, Pittsburgh Penguins, Morning Skate in Raleigh, December 3, 2011.

== Coaching career ==
Bylsma served as an assistant coach with the AHL's Cincinnati Mighty Ducks (2004–05) and the NHL's New York Islanders (2005–06). During the 2008–09 season, Bylsma coached the Penguins' AHL affiliate Wilkes-Barre/Scranton Penguins.

On February 15, 2009, with the Pittsburgh Penguins struggling to make the playoffs, the Penguins organization announced that it had relieved head coach Michel Therrien of his duties and had promoted Bylsma to serve as interim head coach of the team. At 38, he was the youngest head coach in the NHL at the time. Through his first 25 games as Penguins' coach, his 18–3–4 record amounted to 40 points—the second most of any coach in NHL history through their first 25 games. On April 28, Penguins General Manager Ray Shero announced that Bylsma had been named permanent head coach of the team. On June 12, 2009, Bylsma led the Pittsburgh Penguins to a Stanley Cup championship, becoming the 14th coach and the second mid-season replacement to win the Stanley Cup in their first season. While the win made him just the fifth ever American-born coach to win the cup, he also became the third American in the last five seasons to do so. Bylsma was awarded the Jack Adams Award as the league's most outstanding coach for the 2010–11 season due to the Penguins still being a contender for the Stanley Cup without his two star players Sidney Crosby and Evgeni Malkin.

On April 22, 2013, Bylsma became the fastest NHL coach ever to reach 200 wins with a 3–1 win over the Ottawa Senators. On June 30 of the same year, Bylsma was appointed head coach of the United States Olympic for the 2014 Winter Olympics. On January 7, 2014, a month before coaching at the Winter Olympics, Bylsma became the winningest coach in Penguins history (233 wins) with a 5–4 shootout victory over the Vancouver Canucks. On April 4, 2014, Bylsma became the fastest NHL coach to reach 250 wins, leading his team to a 4–2 victory over the Winnipeg Jets. He accomplished the feat in 395 games. On June 6, 2014, Bylsma was fired by the Pittsburgh Penguins, shortly after Jim Rutherford was announced as the team's new general manager.

Bylsma remained on the Penguins' payroll, with no job in the organization, through the 2014–15 season. Following that season, the Penguins granted him permission to seek employment elsewhere. On May 28, 2015, Bylsma was named head coach of the Buffalo Sabres, signing a five-year contract. Bylsma was the Sabres second choice for coach after Mike Babcock, who they heavily pursued before Babcock signed with the divisional rival Toronto Maple Leafs.

On April 20, 2017, Bylsma was fired by the Sabres after two seasons. The transaction came after rumors leaked that Bylsma was at odds with many of the Sabres players, including star Jack Eichel, who allegedly stated he would not sign a contract extension with the team had Bylsma remained head coach. On June 22, 2018, Bylsma was hired as an assistant coach for the Detroit Red Wings. On May 18, 2021, it was announced that he would not be returning to the Detroit Red Wings.

On August 10, 2021, Bylsma returned to the AHL, after he was hired by the Seattle Kraken to become an assistant coach with the Charlotte Checkers. On June 21, 2022, Bylsma was named as head coach of the Kraken's new AHL affiliate, the Coachella Valley Firebirds. After a 46–15–6 season in 2023–24 with the Firebirds, Bylsma was promoted to head coach of the Kraken on May 28, 2024, replacing Dave Hakstol.

On April 21, 2025, Bylsma was fired as head coach of the Kraken after just one season. In a press release, Kraken general manager Ron Francis indicated that "After a thorough review of the season and our expectations for next year and beyond, we’ve made the difficult decision to move in a different direction behind the bench."

== Career statistics ==
=== Regular season and playoffs ===
			Regular season					Playoffs
Season	Team	League	GP	G	A	Pts	PIM	GP	G	A	Pts	PIM
1986–87	Oakville Blades	CJHL	10	4	9	13	21	—	—	—	—	—
1986–87	St. Marys Lincolns	WOHL	27	14	28	42	21	—	—	—	—	—
1987–88	St. Marys Lincolns	WOHL	40	30	39	69	33	8	8	18	26	—
1988–89	Bowling Green University	CCHA	39	4	7	11	16	—	—	—	—	—
1989–90	Bowling Green University	CCHA	44	13	17	30	32	—	—	—	—	—
1990–91	Bowling Green University	CCHA	40	9	12	21	48	—	—	—	—	—
1991–92	Bowling Green University	CCHA	34	11	14	25	24	—	—	—	—	—
1992–93	Greensboro Monarchs	ECHL	60	25	35	60	66	1	0	1	1	10
1992–93	Rochester Americans	AHL	2	0	1	1	0	—	—	—	—	—
1993–94	Greensboro Monarchs	ECHL	25	14	16	30	52	—	—	—	—	—
1993–94	Albany River Rats	AHL	3	0	1	1	2	—	—	—	—	—
1993–94	Moncton Hawks	AHL	50	12	16	28	25	21	3	4	7	31
1994–95	Phoenix Roadrunners	IHL	81	19	23	42	41	9	4	4	8	4
1995–96	Los Angeles Kings	NHL	4	0	0	0	0	—	—	—	—	—
1995–96	Phoenix Roadrunners	IHL	78	22	20	42	48	4	1	0	1	2
1996–97	Los Angeles Kings	NHL	79	3	6	9	32	—	—	—	—	—
1997–98	Los Angeles Kings	NHL	65	3	9	12	33	2	0	0	0	0
1997–98	Long Beach Ice Dogs	IHL	8	2	3	5	0	—	—	—	—	—
1998–99	Los Angeles Kings	NHL	8	0	0	0	2	—	—	—	—	—
1998–99	Springfield Falcons	AHL	2	0	2	2	2	—	—	—	—	—
1998–99	Long Beach Ice Dogs	IHL	58	10	8	18	53	4	0	0	0	8
1999–00	Los Angeles Kings	NHL	64	3	6	9	55	3	0	0	0	0
1999–00	Long Beach Ice Dogs	IHL	6	0	3	3	2	—	—	—	—	—
1999–00	Lowell Lock Monsters	AHL	2	1	1	2	2	—	—	—	—	—
2000–01	Mighty Ducks of Anaheim	NHL	82	1	9	10	22	—	—	—	—	—
2001–02	Mighty Ducks of Anaheim	NHL	77	8	9	17	28	—	—	—	—	—
2002–03	Mighty Ducks of Anaheim	NHL	39	1	4	5	12	11	0	1	1	2
2003–04	Mighty Ducks of Anaheim	NHL	11	0	0	0	0	—	—	—	—	—
2003–04	Cincinnati Mighty Ducks	AHL	36	3	3	6	53	8	1	1	2	4
IHL totals			231	53	57	110	144	17	5	4	9	14
NHL totals			429	19	43	62	184	16	0	1	1	2

== Awards and records ==
- Stanley Cup champion – 2009
- Jack Adams Award – 2011

== Head coaching record ==
Team	Year	Regular season						Postseason			
Team	Year	G	W	L	OTL	Pts	Finish	W	L	Win%	Result
PIT	2008–09	25	18	3	4	(40) (Note: When Bylsma joined the Penguins after the 57th game of the season the team had earned 59 points. The team earned 40 points with Bylsma as head coach.)	2nd in Atlantic	16	8	.667	Won Stanley Cup (DET)
PIT	2009–10	82	47	28	7	101	2nd in Atlantic	7	6	.538	Lost in conference semifinals (MTL)
PIT	2010–11	82	49	25	8	106	2nd in Atlantic	3	4	.429	Lost in conference quarterfinals (TBL)
PIT	2011–12	82	51	25	6	108	2nd in Atlantic	2	4	.333	Lost in conference quarterfinals (PHI)
PIT	2012–13	48 (Note: Only 48 regular season games played due to lockout.)	36	12	0	72	1st in Atlantic	8	7	.533	Lost in conference finals (BOS)
PIT	2013–14	82	51	24	7	109	1st in Metropolitan	7	6	.538	Lost in second round (NYR)
PIT total		401	252	117	32			43	35	.551	6 playoff appearances 1 Stanley Cup title
BUF	2015–16	82	35	36	11	81	7th in Atlantic	—	—	—	Missed playoffs
BUF	2016–17	82	33	37	12	78	8th in Atlantic	—	—	—	Missed playoffs
BUF total		164	68	73	23			—	—	—	
SEA	2024–25	82	35	41	6	76	7th in Pacific	—	—	—	Missed playoffs
SEA total		82	35	41	6			—	—	—	
Total		647	355	231	61	771		43	35	.551	6 playoff appearances 1 Stanley Cup title

== Notes ==
Awards and achievements
Preceded by Dave Tippett	Jack Adams Award; 2011	Succeeded by Ken Hitchcock
Sporting positions
Preceded by Todd Richards	Head coach of the Wilkes-Barre/Scranton Penguins; 2008–2009	Succeeded by Todd Reirden
Preceded by Michel Therrien	Head coach of the Pittsburgh Penguins; 2009–2014	Succeeded by Mike Johnston
Preceded by Ted Nolan	Head coach of the Buffalo Sabres; 2015–2017	Succeeded by Phil Housley
Preceded by Position created	Head coach of the Coachella Valley Firebirds; 2022–2024	Succeeded by Derek Laxdal
Preceded by Dave Hakstol	Head coach of the Seattle Kraken; 2024–2025	Succeeded by Lane Lambert
