= Alexandra Mandrycky =

American sports executive

- Born: 1991 (age 34–35); Atlanta, Georgia
- Occupation: Assistant General Manager
- Organization: Seattle Kraken

Alexandra Mandrycky (born 1991) is a data scientist and current Assistant General Manager for the Seattle Kraken of the National Hockey League.

== Career ==
Mandrycky has a degree in industrial engineering from Georgia Tech, where she became a hockey fan watching Atlanta Thrashers games. After graduating, she spent two years working for War-On-Ice, a public hockey analytics site. In 2015, she was hired as a data analyst for the NHL's Minnesota Wild.

In June 2019, she left the Wild to join the Seattle expansion franchise as Director of Hockey Administration. As director of the Seattle franchise, she was charged with analysing potential candidates for the role of general manager, the position eventually going to former NHL player Ron Francis.

She was named one of the 25 most powerful women in hockey by Sportsnet in 2020 and has been named as a potential future NHL general manager by The Hockey News.
