= List of NHL career assists leaders =

The following is a list of ice hockey players who have recorded 600 assists in the National Hockey League (NHL). All players who reach this mark receive an NHL Milestone Award from the league; the award was introduced in 1982, and all who achieved the accomplishment prior to then were also granted the award.

== Players with 600 NHL assists ==
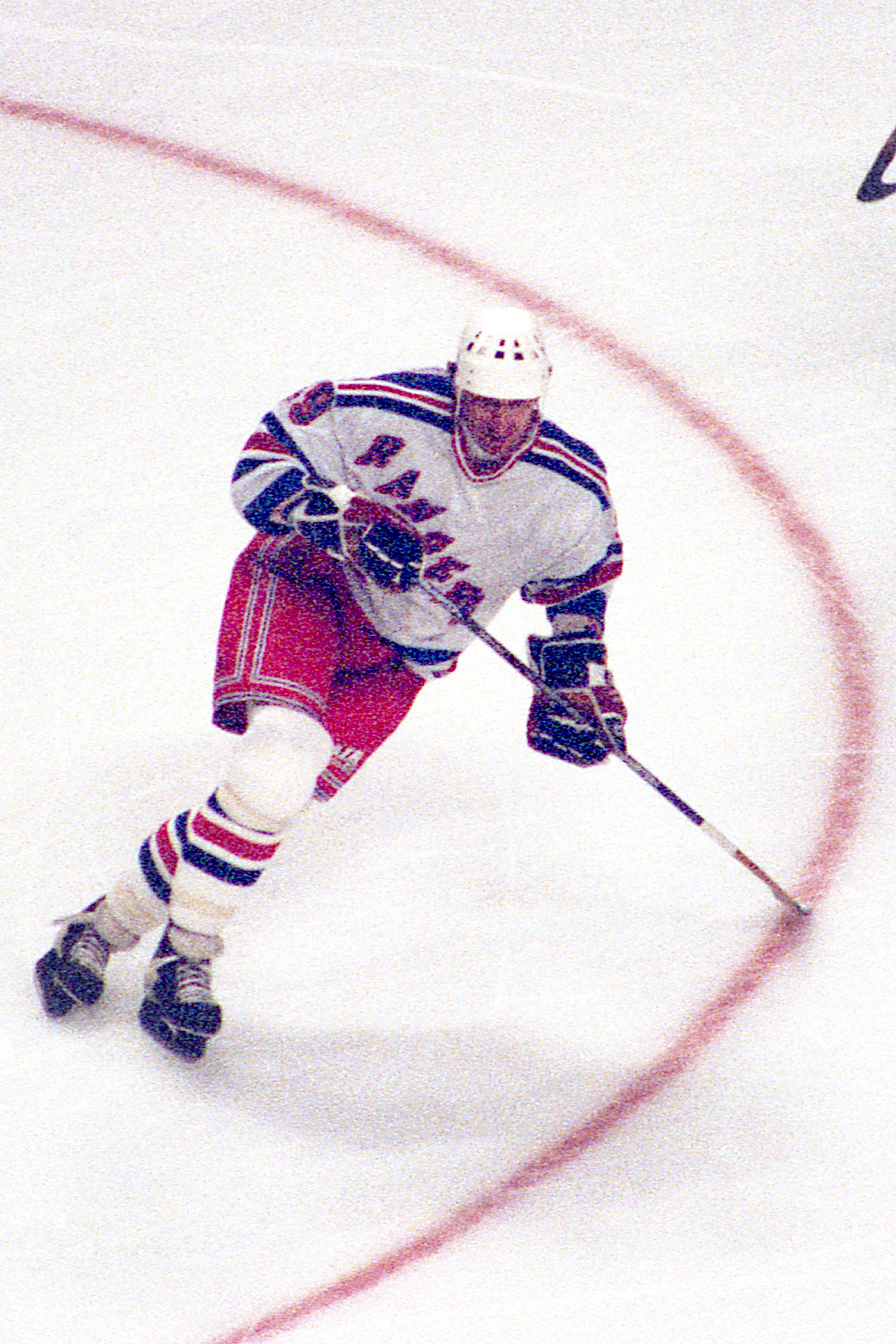
Wayne Gretzky

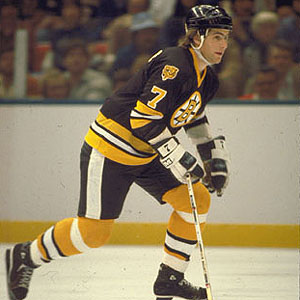
Ray Bourque

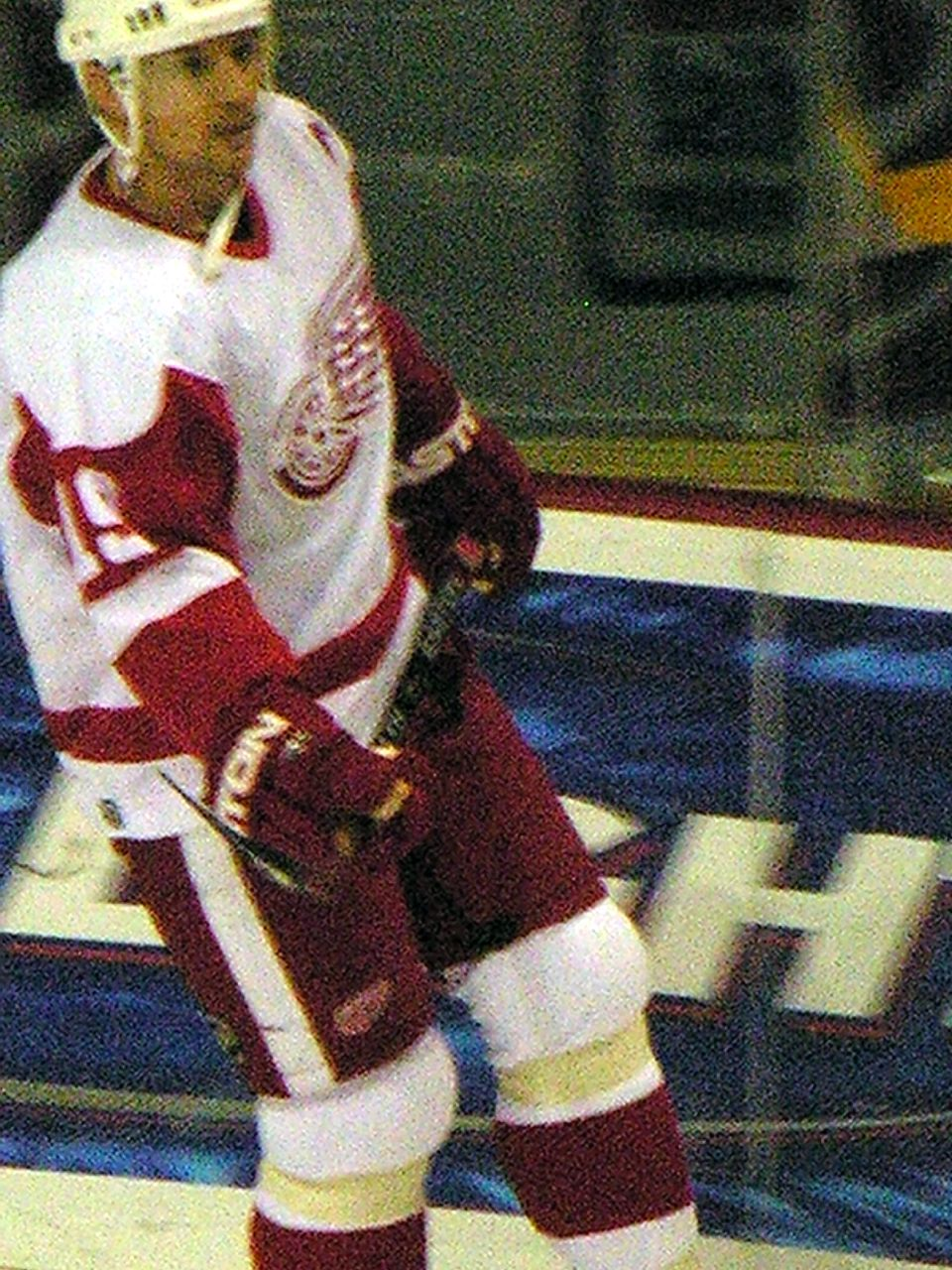
Steve Yzerman

As of completion of the 2025–26 season, 109 players have recorded 600 assists while playing in the NHL.

Of these players, 14 have recorded 1,000 assists while playing in the NHL, led by Wayne Gretzky who has a 714 assist advantage over second-place Ron Francis. Ray Bourque and Paul Coffey are the only defensemen to reach 1,000 assists while Jaromir Jagr is the only non-Canadian player with 1,000 career assists. This alone would place these players on the list of NHL players with 1,000 points, which also earns the NHL Milestone Award.

Legend
Rank – Ranking on all-time assists list
Assists – Career regular season assists
GP – Career regular season games played
A/GP – Mean assists per game played, rounded to two decimal places
With team – Team for which the player recorded their 600th assist
Final season – Final NHL season player competed in
HHOF – Year of induction into the Hockey Hall of Fame
Active NHL player
Active player outside of NHL

Rank	Player	Assists	GP	A/GP	With team	Final season	HHOF
1	Wayne Gretzky	1,963	1,487	1.32	Edmonton Oilers	1998–99	1999
2	Ron Francis	1,249	1,731	0.72	Pittsburgh Penguins	2003–04	2007
3	Mark Messier	1,193	1,756	0.68	Edmonton Oilers	2003–04	2007
4	Ray Bourque	1,169	1,612	0.73	Boston Bruins	2000–01	2004
5	Jaromir Jagr	1,155	1,733	0.67	Pittsburgh Penguins	2017–18	Not eligible yet
6	Paul Coffey	1,135	1,409	0.81	Pittsburgh Penguins	2000–01	2004
7	Joe Thornton	1,109	1,714	0.65	San Jose Sharks	2021–22	2025
8	Sidney Crosby	1,107	1,420	0.78	Pittsburgh Penguins	Active	
9	Adam Oates	1,079	1,337	0.81	Boston Bruins	2003–04	2012
10	Steve Yzerman	1,063	1,514	0.70	Detroit Red Wings	2005–06	2009
11	Gordie Howe	1,049	1,767	0.59	Detroit Red Wings	1979–80	1972 (Note: Gordie Howe initially retired from hockey at the end of the 1970–71 season and was inducted to the Hockey Hall of Fame in 1972. He returned to playing professional hockey, in the World Hockey Association, in 1973–74, where he played until returning to the NHL for the 1979–80 season.)
12	Marcel Dionne	1,040	1,348	0.77	Los Angeles Kings	1988–89	1992
13	Mario Lemieux	1,033	915	1.13	Pittsburgh Penguins	2005–06	1997 (Note: Mario Lemieux initially retired from hockey at the end of the 1996–97 season and was inducted to the Hockey Hall of Fame in 1997. He returned as an NHL owner in 1999, then returned to playing in the NHL in the 2000–01 season.)
14	Joe Sakic	1,016	1,378	0.74	Colorado Avalanche	2008–09	2012
15	Doug Gilmour	964	1,474	0.65	Toronto Maple Leafs	2002–03	2011
16	Mark Recchi	956	1,652	0.58	Philadelphia Flyers	2010–11	2017
17	Al MacInnis	934	1,416	0.66	Calgary Flames	2003–04	2007
18	Larry Murphy	929	1,615	0.58	Pittsburgh Penguins	2000–01	2004
19	Stan Mikita	926	1,394	0.66	Chicago Black Hawks	1979–80	1983
20	Bryan Trottier	901	1,279	0.70	New York Islanders	1993–94	1997
21	Phil Housley	894	1,495	0.60	Calgary Flames	2002–03	2015
22	Patrick Kane	892	1,369	0.65	Chicago Blackhawks	Active	
23	Dale Hawerchuk	891	1,188	0.75	Buffalo Sabres	1996–97	2001
24	Nicklas Lidstrom	878	1,564	0.56	Detroit Red Wings	2011–12	2015
25	Evgeni Malkin	874	1,269	0.69	Pittsburgh Penguins	Active	
26	Phil Esposito	873	1,282	0.68	Boston Bruins	1980–81	1984
27	Denis Savard	865	1,196	0.72	Chicago Blackhawks	1996–97	2000
28	Anze Kopitar	864	1,521	0.57	Los Angeles Kings	Active	
29	Bobby Clarke	852	1,144	0.74	Philadelphia Flyers	1983–84	1987
30	Henrik Sedin	830	1,330	0.62	Vancouver Canucks	2017–18	2022
31	Alex Delvecchio	825	1,550	0.53	Detroit Red Wings	1973–74	1977
32	Gilbert Perreault	814	1,191	0.68	Buffalo Sabres	1986–87	1990
33	Johnny Bucyk	813	1,540	0.53	Boston Bruins	1977–78	1981
33	Mike Modano	813	1,499	0.54	Dallas Stars	2010–11	2014
35	Pierre Turgeon	812	1,294	0.63	St. Louis Blues	2006–07	2023
36	Connor McDavid	811	794	1.02	Edmonton Oilers	Active	
37	Jari Kurri	797	1,251	0.64	Los Angeles Kings	1997–98	2001
38	Guy Lafleur	793	1,126	0.70	Montreal Canadiens	1990–91	1988
39	Peter Stastny	789	977	0.81	Quebec Nordiques	1994–95	1998
40	Claude Giroux	786	1,345	0.58	Ottawa Senators	Active	
41	Mats Sundin	785	1,346	0.58	Toronto Maple Leafs	2008–09	2012
42	Brian Leetch	781	1,205	0.65	New York Rangers	2005–06	2009
43	Jean Ratelle	776	1,280	0.61	Boston Bruins	1980–81	1985
44	Vincent Damphousse	773	1,378	0.56	San Jose Sharks	2003–04	—
44	Teemu Selanne	773	1,451	0.53	Anaheim Ducks	2013–14	2017
46	Chris Chelios	763	1,651	0.46	Chicago Blackhawks	2009–10	2013
47	Nicklas Backstrom	762	1,105	0.69	Washington Capitals	Active	
48	Bernie Federko	761	1,000	0.76	St. Louis Blues	1989–90	2002
49	Alexander Ovechkin	758	1,573	0.48	Washington Capitals	Active	
50	Doug Weight	755	1,238	0.61	St. Louis Blues	2010–11	—
51	Larry Robinson	750	1,384	0.54	Montreal Canadiens	1991–92	1995
52	Denis Potvin	742	1,060	0.70	New York Islanders	1987–88	1991
53	Norm Ullman	739	1,410	0.52	Toronto Maple Leafs	1974–75	1982
54	Ryan Getzlaf	737	1,157	0.64	Anaheim Ducks	2021–22	—
55	Bernie Nicholls	734	1,127	0.65	New Jersey Devils	1998–99	—
56	Rod Brind'Amour	732	1,484	0.49	Carolina Hurricanes	2009–10	—
57	Luc Robitaille	726	1,431	0.51	Los Angeles Kings	2005–06	2009
58	Nikita Kucherov	723	879	0.82	Tampa Bay Lightning	Active	
59	Nathan MacKinnon	722	950	0.76	Colorado Avalanche	Active	
60	Erik Karlsson	721	1,159	0.62	Pittsburgh Penguins	Active	
61	Daniel Alfredsson	713	1,246	0.57	Ottawa Senators	2013–14	2022
62	Jean Beliveau	712	1,125	0.63	Montreal Canadiens	1970–71	1972
62	Scott Stevens	712	1,635	0.44	New Jersey Devils	2003–04	2007
64	Jeremy Roenick	703	1,363	0.52	Philadelphia Flyers	2008–09	2024
65	Dave Andreychuk	698	1,639	0.43	New Jersey Devils	2005–06	2017
65	Brendan Shanahan	698	1,524	0.46	Detroit Red Wings	2008–09	2013
67	Dale Hunter	697	1,407	0.50	Washington Capitals	1998–99	—
68	Sergei Fedorov	696	1,248	0.56	Columbus Blue Jackets	2008–09	2015
69	Henri Richard	688	1,256	0.55	Montreal Canadiens	1974–75	1979
70	Brad Park	683	1,113	0.61	Boston Bruins	1984–85	1988
71	Bobby Smith	679	1,077	0.63	Montreal Canadiens	1992–93	—
71	Ray Whitney	679	1,330	0.51	Phoenix Coyotes	2013–14	—
73	Jarome Iginla	675	1,554	0.43	Boston Bruins	2016–17	2020
74	Brent Burns	672	1,579	0.43	Carolina Hurricanes	Active	
75	John Tavares	660	1,266	0.52	Toronto Maple Leafs	Active	
76	Brett Hull	650	1,269	0.51	Detroit Red Wings	2005–06	2009
77	Daniel Sedin	648	1,306	0.50	Vancouver Canucks	2017–18	2022
78	Bobby Orr	645	657	0.98	Boston Bruins	1978–79	1979
79	Martin St. Louis	642	1,134	0.57	Tampa Bay Lightning	2014–15	2018
80	Gary Suter	641	1,145	0.56	San Jose Sharks	2001–02	—
81	Victor Hedman	639	1,164	0.55	Tampa Bay Lightning	Active	
82	Dave Taylor	638	1,111	0.57	Los Angeles Kings	1993–94	—
83	Borje Salming	637	1,148	0.55	Toronto Maple Leafs	1989–90	1996
83	Darryl Sittler	637	1,096	0.58	Philadelphia Flyers	1984–85	1989
85	Peter Forsberg	636	708	0.90	Philadelphia Flyers	2010–11	2014
86	Neal Broten	634	1,099	0.58	New Jersey Devils	1996–97	—
86	Brad Richards	634	1,126	0.56	Chicago Blackhawks	2015–16	—
88	Theoren Fleury	633	1,084	0.58	New York Rangers	2002–03	—
89	Jason Spezza	632	1,248	0.51	Toronto Maple Leafs	2021–22	—
89	Steven Stamkos	632	1,246	0.51	Nashville Predators	Active	
91	Patrick Marleau	631	1,779	0.35	Toronto Maple Leafs	2020–21	—
92	Kris Letang	628	1,235	0.51	Pittsburgh Penguins	Active	
93	Mike Gartner	627	1,432	0.44	Phoenix Coyotes	1997–98	2001
94	Andy Bathgate	624	1,069	0.58	Pittsburgh Penguins	1970–71	1978
94	Artemi Panarin	624	830	0.75	New York Rangers	Active	
96	Henrik Zetterberg	623	1,082	0.58	Detroit Red Wings	2017–18	—
97	Blake Wheeler	622	1,172	0.53	Winnipeg Jets	2023–24	Eligible 2027
98	Sergei Zubov	619	1,068	0.58	Dallas Stars	2008–09	2019
98	Leon Draisaitl	619	855	0.72	Edmonton Oilers	Active	
100	Patrik Elias	617	1,240	0.50	New Jersey Devils	2015–16	—
101	Rod Gilbert	615	1,065	0.58	New York Rangers	1977–78	1982
101	John Carlson	615	1,159	0.53	Washington Capitals	Active	
103	Patrice Bergeron	613	1,294	0.47	Boston Bruins	2022–23	Eligible 2026
104	Marian Hossa	609	1,309	0.47	Chicago Blackhawks	2016–17	2020
105	Eric Staal	608	1,365	0.45	Florida Panthers	2022–23	Eligible 2026
106	Michel Goulet	605	1,089	0.56	Chicago Blackhawks	1993–94	1998
107	Pavel Datsyuk	604	953	0.63	Detroit Red Wings	2015–16	2024
108	Kirk Muller	602	1,349	0.45	Dallas Stars	2002–03	—
109	Glenn Anderson	601	1,375	0.44	St. Louis Blues	1995–96	2008
