= Adam Oates =

Canadian ice hockey player and coach (born 1962)

- Hockey Hall of Fame, 2012
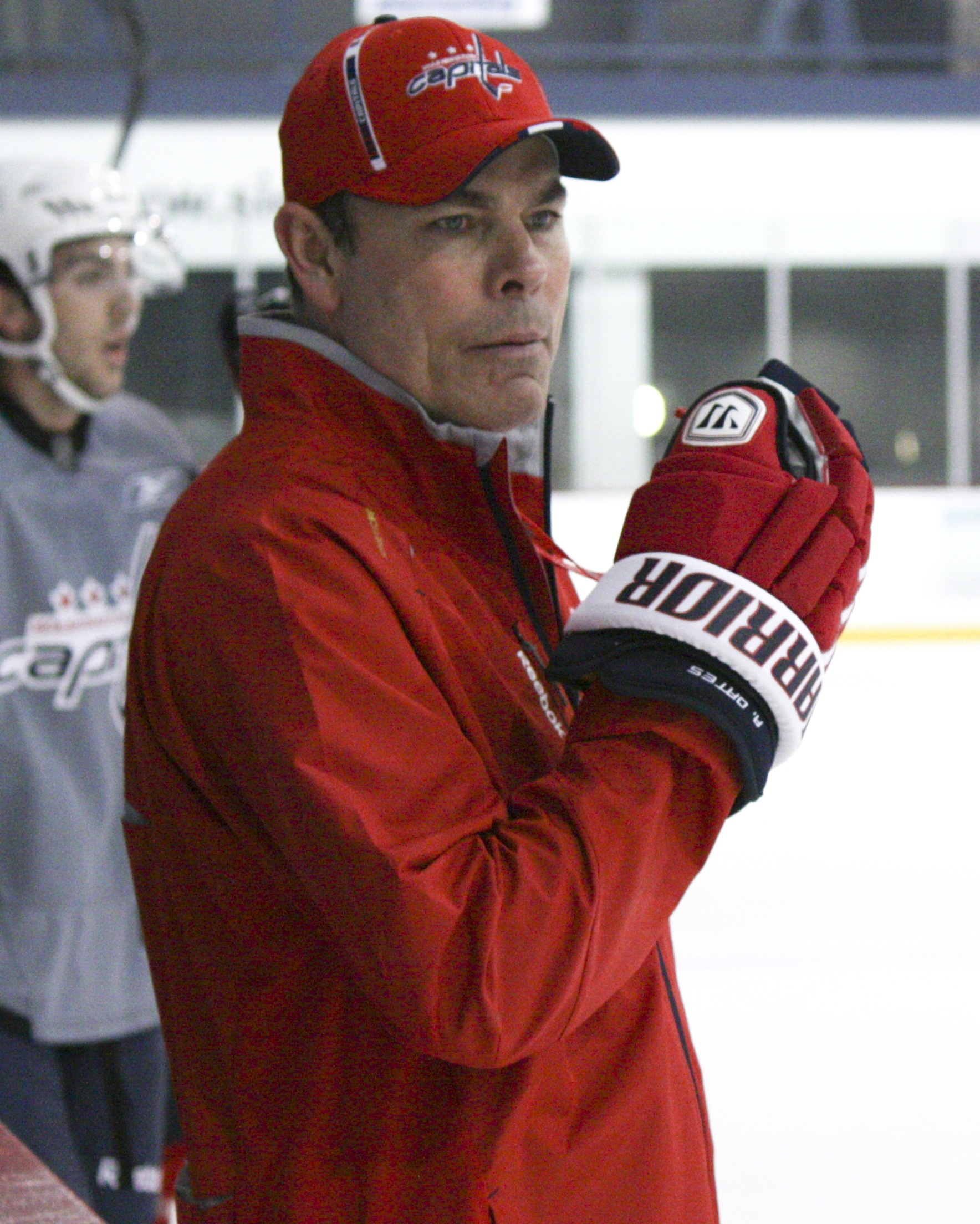
- Oates in 2012
- Born: August 27, 1962 (age 64) Weston, Ontario, Canada
- Height: 5 ft 11 in (180 cm)
- Weight: 190 lb (86 kg; 13 st 8 lb)
- Position: Centre
- Shot: Right
- Played for: Detroit Red Wings; St. Louis Blues; Boston Bruins; Washington Capitals; Philadelphia Flyers; Mighty Ducks of Anaheim; Edmonton Oilers
- NHL draft: Undrafted
- Playing career: 1985–2004

Adam Robert Oates (born August 27, 1962) is a Canadian former professional ice hockey player, former co-head coach for the New Jersey Devils and former head coach for the Washington Capitals. He played 19 seasons in the National Hockey League (NHL) for the Detroit Red Wings, St. Louis Blues, Boston Bruins, Washington Capitals, Philadelphia Flyers, Mighty Ducks of Anaheim and Edmonton Oilers from 1985 to 2004. Known as an elite playmaker, Oates's career total of 1,079 assists was the fifth-highest total in NHL history at the time of his 2004 retirement. He has the second highest number of games played and points scored among undrafted NHL players (behind Wayne Gretzky) with 1,337 and 1,420, respectively.

After retiring as a player, Oates served as an assistant coach for the Tampa Bay Lightning and New Jersey Devils before joining the Capitals as their head coach for two seasons, from 2012 to 2014. In 2017, Oates was named one of the 100 Greatest NHL Players in history.

As a college player, Oates was a standout forward for the RPI Engineers. He set single-season school records for assists and points. He was named an Eastern College Athletic Conference (ECAC) all-star and National Collegiate Athletic Association (NCAA) All-American in both 1984 and 1985. Oates was named a tournament all-star in helping RPI win the 1985 national championship, and in 1990–91, the NHL included him in its second All-Star team; he played in five All-Star Games. He holds the record for most points all-time of any NHL player who also played NCAA Hockey.

Oates was inducted into the Hockey Hall of Fame on November 12, 2012.

== Early life ==
Oates was born on August 27, 1962, in Weston, a neighbourhood in Toronto. As a youth, he played both hockey and box lacrosse, favouring the latter sport. He played in the 1975 Quebec International Pee-Wee Hockey Tournament with a minor ice hockey team from Toronto.

Oates played five seasons with the Etobicoke Eclipse of the Ontario Lacrosse Association (OLA) Junior A Lacrosse League. An offensive standout, Oates' total of 181 points in 19 games in 1981 was the 11th highest total in OLA junior history at the time. As the league's leading scorer, he won the Bobby Allan Award and in one game that season, set OLA Junior A single-game records of 19 assists and 29 points. Oates played one season of Senior A with the Brampton Excelsiors of Major Series Lacrosse but left the game in 1984 to focus on his hockey career.

Describing his younger self as a "punk", Oates said he partied frequently. He dropped out of high school to focus on hockey and ended up working as a gas station attendant at age 19. Oates played two full seasons and parts of a third with the Junior A Markham Waxers of the Ontario Provincial Junior A Hockey League (OPJAHL). He scored 89 points in 43 games during 1980–81 and 159 points – including 105 assists – in 1981–82. He went unselected in the NHL entry draft, however, as scouts considered him too slow to play in the NHL. He returned to high school to complete his diploma when he was recruited to play for Rensselaer Polytechnic Institute (RPI).

== Playing career ==
=== College ===
RPI's assistant coach Paul Allen noticed Oates during a 1982 OPJAHL game while scouting a different player and offered him a position on the school's team. Consequently, Oates played three seasons with the RPI Engineers, leading the team in assists each year. After scoring 42 points in 22 games in his freshman season of 1982–83, he spent the summer working with a skating instructor to improve his foot speed. In 1983–84, he set school records in points with 83 and assists with 57. He was named to the East Coast Athletic Conference (ECAC) second all-star team. He became the first RPI hockey player to earn a berth on the National Collegiate Athletic Association (NCAA) All-American team since 1965.

In 1984–85, Oates broke his own school records by recording 60 assists and 91 points. His career total of 150 assists remains a school record. Again named an NCAA All-American, he was voted to the ECAC first all-star team and was a finalist for the Hobey Baker Award as the top hockey player in the NCAA. After helping RPI win the 1985 national championship, he was included in the all-tournament team. In his three years with RPI, the Engineers recorded an 85–19–1 record and won the ECAC championships in 1984 and 1985. Oates was voted to the ECAC's all-decade team of the 1980s. He was inducted into RPI's Athletics Hall of Fame and was named the inaugural member of the hockey team's Ring of Honor in 2004.

=== Detroit and St. Louis ===
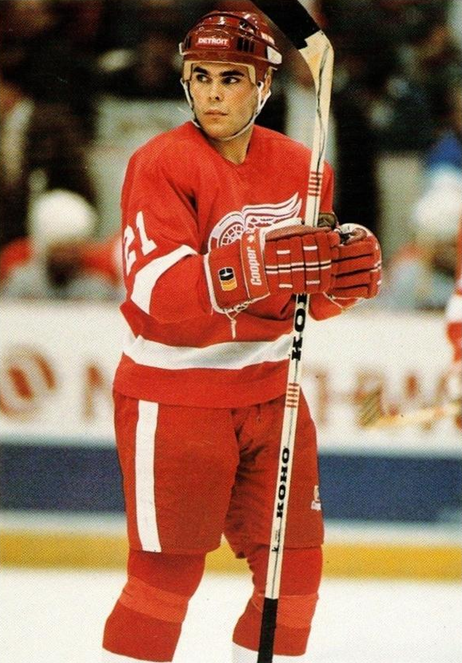
Oates with the Detroit Red Wings in 1986

NHL teams took an interest in Oates following his junior season; at least five teams attempted to sign him. Choosing to forgo his final year of college eligibility, Oates signed a four-year, $1.1 million contract with the Detroit Red Wings that made him the highest paid rookie in the NHL in 1985–86. He made his NHL debut on October 10, 1985, against the Minnesota North Stars, scoring his first goal that night on goaltender Don Beaupre and added an assist. After this, Oates struggled offensively and was pointless in his following 16 games; the team subsequently demoted him to the Adirondack Red Wings of the American Hockey League (AHL). Oates split the remainder of the season between Detroit and Adirondack, finishing his first NHL season with 38 games played, 9 goals and 11 assists. He scored 18 goals and 28 assists in 34 games in the AHL. Having finished the NHL season in Detroit, he was returned to Adirondack for the AHL playoffs, which the team won to take the Calder Cup championship.

Oates became a fulltime NHLer in 1986–87, scoring 47 points in 76 games. He improved to 54 points in 63 games the following year despite missing a month due to a groin injury, and finished third in team scoring with 78 points in 1988–89. However, Detroit made changes following a first round loss in the playoffs; Oates, along with Paul MacLean, was traded to the St. Louis Blues on June 15, 1989, in exchange for veterans Bernie Federko and Tony McKegney. The deal, which is now considered one of the worst in Red Wings' history, left Oates "heartbroken" to leave his first NHL club.

"The year he scored 86, it was just magical. It was one of those years, wherever we went Brett would score two goals or a hat trick. It was just fantastic. I can't believe we only played together 2½ years because it felt like 10. It was just so special. We just really hit it off as buddies, friends. We played the game the same way; the chemistry was just excellent."

— Oates discusses his time with Brett Hull in St. Louis.

The Blues made Oates their first-line centre and played him alongside Brett Hull. The pair, dubbed "Hull and Oates" as a play on the band Hall and Oates, put up prolific offensive numbers. In 1989–90, Oates topped the 100-point mark for the first time in his career with 102 points. He improved to 115 in 1990–91. He helped Hull score 72 and 86 goals those seasons, the latter the third highest in single-season total in NHL history. Oates was named to the second all-star team following the season and played in the 1991 All-Star Game.

Oates signed a four-year, $3 million contract extension with the Blues prior to the 1991–92 season, but after the team signed Brendan Shanahan, Garth Butcher and Ron Sutter to significant deals, felt he was underpaid. After playing in his second career All-Star Game, he threatened to walk off the team following the All-Star break if the Blues did not renegotiate his contract, prompting a negative reaction from St. Louis fans, who booed him loudly. The conflict was resolved on February 7, 1992, when the team traded him to the Boston Bruins in exchange for Craig Janney and Stéphane Quintal.

=== Boston and Washington ===
Oates' best individual season came in his first full year in Boston. He led the league with 97 assists in 1992–93 and finished third in overall scoring with 142 points. At the 1993 All-Star Game, Oates set a record by recording four assists in one period as part of a 16–6 victory for the Wales Conference. He played in his fourth consecutive All-Star Game in 1994 and again finished third in league scoring with 112 points in 1993–94. In a five-year period between 1989 and 1994, Oates was the second-highest point producer in the NHL. His average of 114 points per season over that time was second to Wayne Gretzky's 124.

A finger injury suffered during the 1994 Stanley Cup playoffs hampered Oates throughout the 1994–95 season and required surgery at the season's conclusion. Despite the injury, Oates finished fourth in the NHL with 41 assists in a season disrupted by a work stoppage. In game five of the conference quarter-final series against the New Jersey Devils, Oates scored the final goal in the history of the Boston Garden in a 3–2 loss. The Bruins signed him to a five-year, $10 million contract extension late in that season, but Oates once again became frustrated with his salary relative to the rest of the league by 1997. With the Bruins struggling on the ice and out of playoff contention late in 1996–97 season, Oates publicly berated team management, saying, "You go on a [road] trip and everyone says it's a big trip. For what? So we can win five games because we're lousy and we get in the eighth spot and lose four straight and get embarrassed and then get shelled all summer? It's upstairs, baby. That's their job, not ours. ... Are we rebuilding? What are we doing? What direction are we going in?"

Less than two weeks after his tirade, on March 1, 1997, Oates was traded to the Washington Capitals. In the trade, Oates, Bill Ranford and Rick Tocchet went to Washington in exchange for Jim Carey, Anson Carter, Jason Allison and two draft picks, 3rd Round 1997 (Lee Goren) & Conditional 2nd Round 1998 (Bobby Allen) Oates initially refused to report to Washington, demanding his contract be renegotiated, but chose to join the team after a four-day holdout. He continued to demand a new contract in the off-season, while his agent claimed Oates would retire before playing for the Capitals again. After several months of contentious negotiations, the two sides agreed to a three-year contract worth around $2.9 million per season with an option on a fourth year.

Oates became the 47th player in NHL history, and the 15th fastest, to score his 1,000th career point on October 7, 1997, against the New York Islanders. He reached the milestone by scoring a hat-trick and adding two assists for the sixth five-point game of his career. He finished the 1997–98 season as the team leader with 56 assists, and second to Peter Bondra in team scoring with 78 points. The Capitals reached the 1998 Stanley Cup Final, which they lost to the Detroit Red Wings in a four-game sweep; their first finals appearance in franchise history.

The Capitals named Oates the ninth captain in franchise history prior to the 1999–2000 season, following the departure of his predecessor, Dale Hunter. He led the team in scoring with 71 points and played his 1,000th NHL game on December 22, 1999, against the Vancouver Canucks. He led the league in assists the following two seasons, at the ages of 38 and 39, with 69 in 2000–01 and 64 in 2001–02. On January 14, 2002, Oates became the eighth player in NHL history to reach 1,000 career assists when he set up Dainus Zubrus' overtime winning goal in a 1–0 victory over the Boston Bruins.

=== Philadelphia, Anaheim and Edmonton ===
With Washington out of playoff contention late in the 2001–02 season and with his contract expiring following the season, the Capitals traded Oates to the Philadelphia Flyers on March 19, 2002, in exchange for goaltender Maxime Ouellet and the Flyers' first, second and third round selections in the 2002 NHL entry draft. The Flyers hoped that bringing Oates in would solidify their playoff chances. The move did not work, as the Flyers were defeated in the first round by the lower ranked Ottawa Senators, losing the series in five games. The team scored only one goal in regulation time and were shut-out three times by Ottawa's Patrick Lalime.

The Flyers chose not to offer Oates a new contract following the loss, making him an unrestricted free agent. He then signed a $3.5 million contract for the 2002–03 season, with an option for 2003–04, with the Mighty Ducks of Anaheim on July 1, 2002. He scored 45 points in 67 games with the Mighty Ducks, and added 13 points in 21 playoff games. Anaheim reached the 2003 Stanley Cup Final, where in the third game of the series against the New Jersey Devils, Oates assisted on Ruslan Salei's overtime-winning goal. It was Oates' ninth career playoff overtime point, tying him with Joe Sakic and Doug Gilmour for the NHL all-time lead. The Ducks ultimately lost the series in seven games.

The Mighty Ducks declined their option on the 41-year-old Oates' contract, again making him a free agent. He remained unsigned six weeks into the 2003–04 season until he agreed to a one-year contract with the Edmonton Oilers on November 17, 2003. He appeared in 60 games in Edmonton, scoring 2 goals and 16 assists. The Oilers were eliminated from playoff contention in their final game of the season with a 5–2 loss to the Vancouver Canucks on April 4, 2004. Oates announced his retirement as a player immediately after the game.

== Playing style ==
"He doesn't get as much publicity as the goal scorers, but he loves to watch you put the puck in the net. I never asked him why he didn't want to score more himself; I was afraid he'd change his mind."

— Brett Hull on Oates' reputation as a playmaker

Oates was one of the NHL's great playmakers, a style that he credits his father as encouraging: "It was just kind of our family talks: 'If you can be unselfish, your teammates will always like you.' And it just kind of became my role, where I was obviously trying to please my dad, growing up and becoming a playmaker out of that." Oates' father, a British immigrant, idolized Stanley Matthews, considered one of the greatest association football (soccer) players of all-time and hoped that his son would adopt a pass-first mentality similar to Matthews.

Oates led the NHL in assists three times – 1992–93, 2000–01 and 2001–02 – and finished in the top ten on 12 occasions. Oates finished third in league scoring three times; 1990–91, 1992–93, and 1993–94. He is also the only player in NHL history to centre three 50-goal scorers, helping Brett Hull, Cam Neely, and Peter Bondra reach the mark. His teammates praised his consistency, noting Oates continued to score points at an elite level when he did not have star players as linemates. Oates scored himself, reaching the 20-goal mark seven times, including a career-high 45 in 1992–93, a season in which he led the league with 11 game-winning goals. Boston teammate Ray Bourque suggested in 1994 that Oates was underrated, saying, "I think a lot of people take what he does for granted. He does it in a quiet way. He's not a flashy guy. He's not looking for attention, he just goes out and does it. He's the best centerman I've been around. I never knew he was this good playing against him because I didn't see him this much." Others noted that Oates never received the attention nor honors of the other nine players on the NHL's top ten all-time assists list.

== Honours ==
At the time of Oates' retirement, his 1,420 points were the 13th highest total in NHL history, and his 1,079 assists ranked 5th. He played in a total of five NHL All-Star Games and was a six-time finalist for the Lady Byng Memorial Trophy for sportsmanship and gentlemanly conduct on the ice (Oates has described himself as the Susan Lucci for the Lady Byng.) The Markham Waxers retired his jersey number 10 in 1999. In 2004 he was inducted into the RPI athletics hall of fame, and he was the first person to be enshrined on the RPI ring of honor in 2005. In 2016 Oates was inducted into the Etobicoke Sports Hall of Fame. In January 2017, Oates was part of the first group of players to be named one of the '100 Greatest NHL Players' in history by the National Hockey League. In 2024 Oates was inducted into the Ontario Junior Hockey league Hall of Fame.

=== Hall of Fame ===
Oates was inducted into the Hockey Hall of Fame as part of its 2012 class.

== Coaching career ==
=== Assistant coach ===
The Tampa Bay Lightning hired Oates as an assistant coach in the 2009–10 season, where he worked with the team's offence. Under his guidance, the team's power play finished ninth in the league and he was credited with playing a significant role in Steven Stamkos' offensive development. Oates then joined the New Jersey Devils in 2010, where he served an additional two years as an assistant coach, helping the team reach the 2012 Stanley Cup Final, which they lost to the Los Angeles Kings in six games. New Jersey general manager Lou Lamoriello praised Oates' work with the team: "He did an outstanding job for us. I wish him well. He's very communicative, very intelligent, he explains things very well. He has the resume behind him as a player and having the success he had – all the credentials are there for having the kind of respect players have for him."

=== Washington Capitals ===
The same day Oates was elected to the Hockey Hall of Fame, June 26, 2012, he returned to Washington Capitals, where he was named the 16th head coach in franchise history, succeeding Dale Hunter, who had decided not to renew his contract. Oates' former teammates praised his appointment as head coach, calling him a "detail-oriented players' coach" with excellent communication skills. While the 2012–13 NHL lockout delayed Oates' debut with the Capitals, he acted as co-coach with Mark French for Washington's AHL affiliate, the Hershey Bears.

When the NHL resumed for the shortened 2012–13 season, Oates and the Capitals struggled initially and won only 2 of their first 11 games. However, the team improved throughout the season and went from last place in the Southeast Division to first; they won 15 of their final 19 games to win the division title. Oates' players praised his positive outlook and willingness to work closely with them as primary reasons why the team was able to turn its season around. However, the Capitals were defeated in the first round of the 2013 Stanley Cup playoffs, losing to the New York Rangers in seven games.

The Capitals struggled throughout the 2013–14 season and faced increasing discontent from the fans as the team had failed to advance far into the playoffs in 16 years. The team finished with a 38–30–14 record, but finished ninth in the Eastern Conference and missed the playoffs. As a consequence, the Capitals opted to dismiss both Oates as head coach and the team's general manager, George McPhee.

=== New Jersey Devils ===
On December 27, 2014, Oates was hired by the New Jersey Devils to become what the team referred to as a "co-head coach" following the team's firing of head coach Peter DeBoer. Oates split coaching duties with former Devils captain Scott Stevens, with each coach responsible for a specific group of players; Oates was responsible for the forwards while Stevens was responsible for the defensemen. Oates and Stevens were assisted by Devils general manager Lou Lamoriello, who had previously served as the team's interim head coach. On June 1, 2015, John Hynes was named the new full-time head coach.

In 2018 Oates joined the Los Angeles Kings as a team consultant.

== Personal life ==
Although Oates left RPI after three years to begin his professional hockey career, he continued his studies during the offseasons. He earned a Bachelor of Science in Management from the school in 1991. While a member of the Bruins, Oates also worked for a brief time with the investment firm Boston Capital Partners.

Oates is a co-founder of sporting apparel retailer Old Time Hockey, which donates a portion of all sales to the NHL emergency assistance fund. Oates operated a men's boutique on 69th and 3rd in New York City for a few years, which he discussed when profiled by Harry Rosen.

His parents are David and Loretta, and he has two sisters: Michelle and Laurel. Oates was once engaged to model and actress Darlene Vogel; however, the couple cancelled their planned 1998 marriage at the last moment. He also has a house in Osterville, Massachusetts. He also founded the Oates Sports Group, where he mentors upcoming hockey players, holding development programs in Boston, Toronto and Minneapolis.

== Career statistics ==
=== Regular season and playoffs ===
			Regular season					Playoffs
Season	Team	League	GP	G	A	Pts	PIM	GP	G	A	Pts	PIM
1979–80	Markham Waxers	OPJAHL	9	1	6	7	2	—	—	—	—	—
1980–81	Markham Waxers	OPJAHL	43	36	53	89	89	—	—	—	—	—
1981–82	Markham Waxers	OPJAHL	47	54	105	159	30	—	—	—	—	—
1982–83	R.P.I Engineers	ECAC	22	9	33	42	8	—	—	—	—	—
1983–84	R.P.I Engineers	ECAC	38	26	57	83	15	—	—	—	—	—
1984–85	R.P.I Engineers	ECAC	38	31	60	91	29	—	—	—	—	—
1985–86	Detroit Red Wings	NHL	38	9	11	20	10	—	—	—	—	—
1985–86	Adirondack Red Wings	AHL	34	18	28	46	4	17	7	14	21	4
1986–87	Detroit Red Wings	NHL	76	15	32	47	21	16	4	7	11	6
1987–88	Detroit Red Wings	NHL	63	14	40	54	20	16	8	12	20	6
1988–89	Detroit Red Wings	NHL	69	16	62	78	14	6	0	8	8	2
1989–90	St. Louis Blues	NHL	80	23	79	102	30	12	2	12	14	4
1990–91	St. Louis Blues	NHL	61	25	90	115	29	13	7	13	20	10
1991–92	St. Louis Blues	NHL	54	10	59	69	12	—	—	—	—	—
1991–92	Boston Bruins	NHL	26	10	20	30	10	15	5	14	19	4
1992–93	Boston Bruins	NHL	84	45	97	142	32	4	0	9	9	4
1993–94	Boston Bruins	NHL	77	32	80	112	45	13	3	9	12	8
1994–95	Boston Bruins	NHL	48	12	41	53	8	5	1	0	1	2
1995–96	Boston Bruins	NHL	70	25	67	92	18	5	2	5	7	2
1996–97	Boston Bruins	NHL	63	18	52	70	10	—	—	—	—	—
1996–97	Washington Capitals	NHL	17	4	8	12	4	—	—	—	—	—
1997–98	Washington Capitals	NHL	82	18	58	76	36	21	6	11	17	8
1998–99	Washington Capitals	NHL	59	12	42	54	22	—	—	—	—	—
1999–00	Washington Capitals	NHL	82	15	56	71	14	5	0	3	3	4
2000–01	Washington Capitals	NHL	81	13	69	82	28	6	0	0	0	0
2001–02	Washington Capitals	NHL	66	11	57	68	22	—	—	—	—	—
2001–02	Philadelphia Flyers	NHL	14	3	7	10	6	5	0	2	2	0
2002–03	Mighty Ducks of Anaheim	NHL	67	9	36	45	16	21	4	9	13	6
2003–04	Edmonton Oilers	NHL	60	2	16	18	8	—	—	—	—	—
NHL totals			1,337	341	1,079	1,420	415	163	42	114	156	66

=== Coaching ===
Season	Team	League	Regular season						Postseason
Season	Team	League	G	W	L	OTL	Pct	Division rank	Result
2012–13	Washington Capitals	NHL	48	27	18	3	.600	1st, Southeast	Lost in first round (NYR)
2013–14	Washington Capitals	NHL	82	38	30	14	.549	5th, Metropolitan	Missed playoffs
NHL totals			130	65	48	17	.565		1 playoff appearance

== Awards and honours ==
College
Award	Year	Ref.
All-ECAC Hockey Second Team	1983–84	
AHCA East First-Team All-American	1983–84; 1984–85	
All-ECAC Hockey First Team	1984–85	
NCAA National Champion	1985	
All-NCAA All-Tournament Team	1985	
RPI athletics hall of fame	2004	

National Hockey League
Award	Year	Ref.
Second team All-Star	1990–91	
Played in NHL All-Star Game	1991; 1992; 1993; 1994; 1997	
Hockey Hall of Fame	2012	
100 Greatest NHL Players	2017	

Boston Bruins
Award	Year
Elizabeth C. Dufresne Trophy	1992-93
Bruins 3 Stars Award	1992-93 1993-94 1995-96
Named One of the Top 100 Best Bruins Players of all Time	2023

Other honors

- Markham Waxers retired his jersey #10 in 1999.
- 2016 Etobicoke Sports Hall of Fame inductee
- 2024 Ontario Junior Hockey league Hall of Fame inductee
- In 2023, was ranked number 69 in The Athletic’s list of the 100 greatest hockey players of all time

== See also ==
- List of NHL statistical leaders

Awards and achievements
Preceded by Mitch Olson	ECAC Hockey Most Outstanding Player in Tournament; 1984	Succeeded by Daren Puppa
Sporting positions
Preceded by Dale Hunter	Washington Capitals captain 1999–2001	Succeeded by Steve Konowalchuk; Brendan Witt
Preceded by Dale Hunter	Head coach of the Washington Capitals; 2012–14	Succeeded by Barry Trotz
Preceded by Peter DeBoer	Interim Head coach of the New Jersey Devils; 2014–15 with Scott Stevens	Succeeded by John Hynes
