= Glen Hanlon =

Canadian ice hockey goaltender

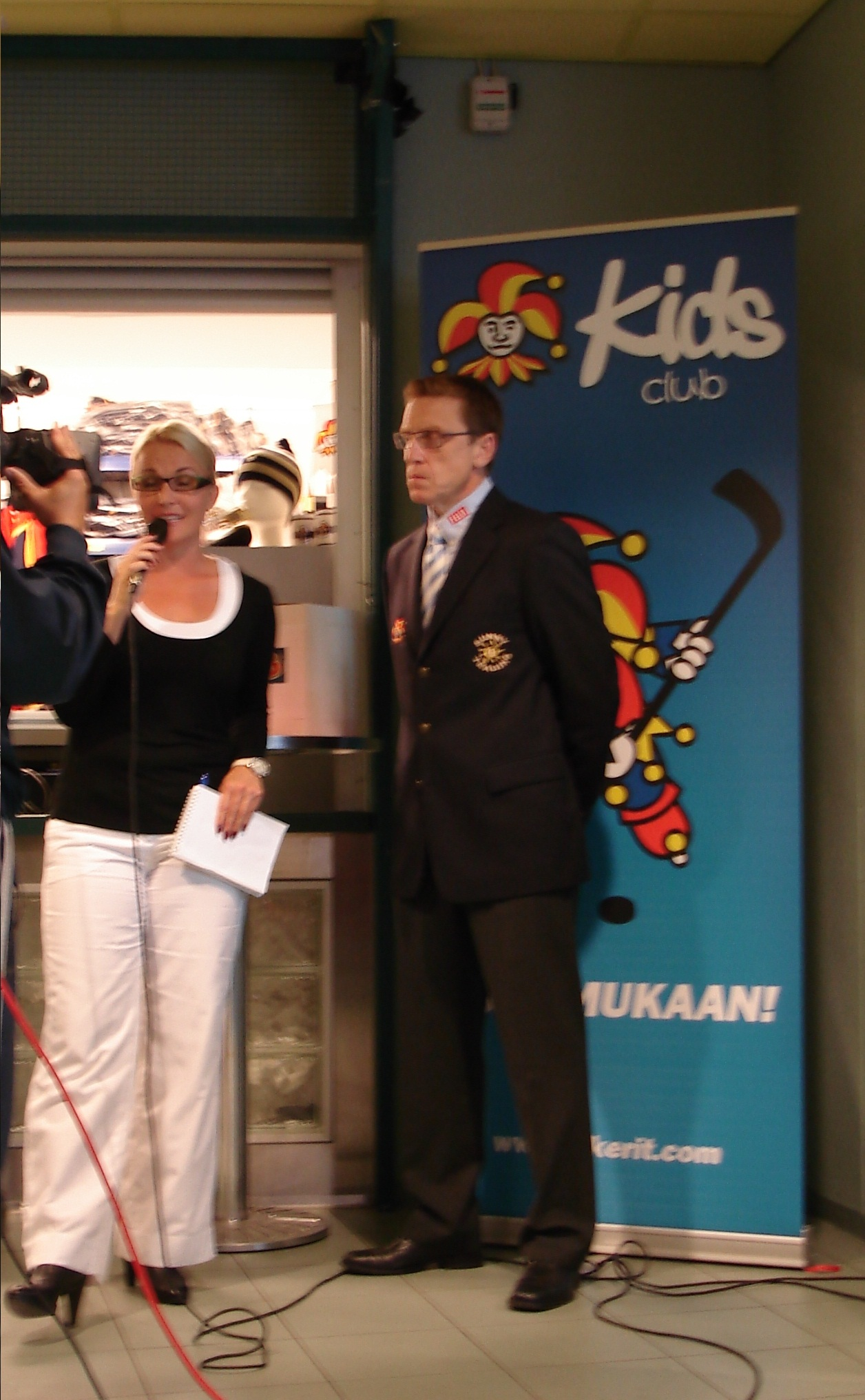
- Glen Hanlon in 2008
- Born: February 20, 1957 (age 69) Brandon, Manitoba, Canada
- Height: 6 ft 0 in (183 cm)
- Weight: 185 lb (84 kg; 13 st 3 lb)
- Position: Goaltender
- Caught: Right
- Played for: Vancouver Canucks; St. Louis Blues; New York Rangers; Detroit Red Wings
- NHL draft: 40th overall, 1977; Vancouver Canucks
- WHA draft: 30th overall, 1977; Houston Aeros
- Playing career: 1977–1991

Glen A. Hanlon (born February 20, 1957) is a Canadian ice hockey coach, executive and former goaltender.

Hanlon played in the National Hockey League for the Vancouver Canucks, St. Louis Blues, New York Rangers and the Detroit Red Wings. He is also former head coach of the Washington Capitals of the NHL, Dinamo Minsk of the Kontinental Hockey League (KHL), the Slovakia national ice hockey team, the Belarusian national ice hockey team and the Swiss national ice hockey team. He was also a goaltender scout for the Vancouver Canucks.

== Playing career ==
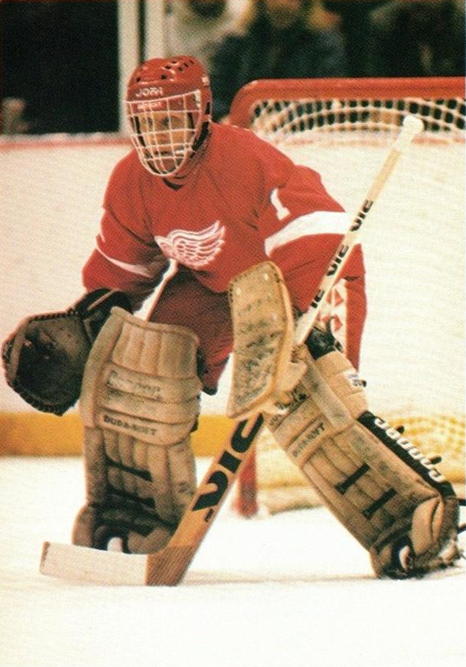
Hanlon in goal for Detroit Red Wings

Hanlon was drafted by the Vancouver Canucks in the 1977 NHL entry draft, in the third round (40th overall pick). He played for the Vancouver Canucks, St. Louis Blues, New York Rangers and Detroit Red Wings in the NHL, as well as the Western Hockey League, Central Hockey League, American Hockey League and International Hockey League.

In 1978, he won the Central Hockey League's Rookie of the Year.

On October 14, 1979, Hanlon allowed the first career NHL goal scored by Wayne Gretzky, who would eventually become the NHL's all-time scoring leader. Hanlon has been quoted as saying "I created a monster" in reference to allowing Gretzky's first goal.

== Coaching career ==
Hanlon has served as the assistant coach for both the Canucks and Washington Capitals before becoming the head coach of the American Hockey League's Portland Pirates and then the Capitals. After a miserable start to the 2003–04 season, Capitals general manager George McPhee fired head coach Bruce Cassidy and promoted assistant Hanlon to head coaching duties. The Capitals went 15–30–9 under Hanlon to finish the year. Led by 2004 first-round pick Alexander Ovechkin, the Capitals were expected to improve; however the team was still young and compiled a record of 29–41–12. Despite this, Hanlon was guaranteed one more year as coach of the Capitals. In 2005, he was assigned to coach the Belarus hockey team. He led the team to 10th place at the 2005 Men's World Ice Hockey Championships, and to historic high sixth place at the 2006 Men's World Ice Hockey Championships. He was named "sports man of the year" by major Belarusian sports newspaper "Прессбол" in 2006. The 2006–07 Capitals compiled an 8–5–4 mark by the end of November, though long losing streaks eliminated the Caps' chances of making the post-season, as they finished 28–40–14.

Over the 2007 offseason, McPhee signed many talented players including Michael Nylander, Tom Poti, Viktor Kozlov and young Swedish star Nicklas Bäckström, elevating expectations in Washington. In the season's first week, the Capitals jumped to a 3–0 record but went on to lose 15 of the next 18 games (3–14–1), which lead to Hanlon's dismissal. McPhee stated that Hanlon had lost control of the team, so he elected to replace Hanlon with Bruce Boudreau, the head coach of the AHL's Hershey Bears. Immediately after Hanlon's exit, the Capitals won against the high-flying Philadelphia Flyers and Carolina Hurricanes. The team finished 37–17–7 the rest of the way in 2007–2008, notching their first division title since 2000–01. Following his dismissal, Hanlon accepted an offer by the Capitals to act as a scout based in the Washington, D.C. area. On February 14, 2008, it was announced that Hanlon would be the head coach of Finnish SM-Liiga team Jokerit.

On March 24, 2010, Glen Hanlon was announced as a new head coach of the Slovak national ice hockey team. He replaced Jan Filc and signed a four-year contract from April 1, 2010, to the next Winter Olympics in Sochi, Russia, in 2014. Slovakia under his conduct has finished in 12th place on World Championship in Germany 2010. This contract ended prematurely on May 18, 2011, after the World Championship in Slovakia, where he led the Slovak national ice hockey team to the 10th place.

From 2011 to May 2013, Hanlon was assistant coach of the Vancouver Giants in the Western Hockey League before returning to coach in Europe.

In 2013, Glen returned to coach the Belarus national ice hockey team. He replaced Andrei Skabelka. On May 27, 2014, it was announced that Glen Hanlon signed a two-year contract as new head coach for the Swiss men's national ice hockey team. Hanlon and the Swiss Ice Hockey Federation parted company in October 2015. The parting came by mutual consent due to family reasons.

On May 19, 2016, Hanlon was named general manager of Western Hockey League's Vancouver Giants, the organization he had worked for as an assistant coach earlier in his career. He left the organization after the 2017–18 season.

On June 18, 2018, Hanlon was named the coach of the Hungarian team, DVTK Jegesmedvék.

On May 8, 2020, Hanlon became the head coach of the Krefeld Pinguine in Germany.

== Career statistics ==
=== Regular season and playoffs ===
			Regular season									Playoffs
Season	Team	League	GP	W	L	T	MIN	GA	SO	GAA	SV%	GP	W	L	MIN	GA	SO	GAA	SV%
1973–74	Brandon Travellers	MJHL	20	—	—	—	1059	64	1	3.63	.898	—	—	—	—	—	—	—	—
1974–75	Brandon Travellers	MJHL	3	—	—	—	—	—	3	3.00	.922	—	—	—	—	—	—	—	—
1974–75	Brandon Wheat Kings	WCHL	43	—	—	—	2498	176	0	4.22	.892	5	—	—	284	29	0	6.13	—
1975–76	Brandon Wheat Kings	WCHL	64	31	25	4	3523	234	4	3.99	.891	5	—	—	300	33	0	6.60	—
1975–76	New Westminster Bruins	MC	—	—	—	—	—	—	—	—	—	4	2	1	179	10	0	3.35	—
1976–77	Brandon Wheat Kings	WCHL	65	49	7	7	3784	194	4	3.09	.906	16	—	—	913	53	0	3.48	.904
1977–78	Vancouver Canucks	NHL	4	1	2	1	198	9	0	2.73	.904	—	—	—	—	—	—	—	—
1977–78	Tulsa Oilers	CHL	53	25	23	3	3123	160	3	3.07	.903	2	1	1	120	5	0	2.50	—
1978–79	Vancouver Canucks	NHL	31	12	13	5	1819	94	3	3.10	.898	—	—	—	—	—	—	—	—
1979–80	Vancouver Canucks	NHL	57	17	29	10	3331	193	0	3.48	.883	2	0	0	60	3	0	3.00	.889
1980–81	Vancouver Canucks	NHL	17	5	8	0	797	59	1	4.44	.856	—	—	—	—	—	—	—	—
1980–81	Dallas Black Hawks	CHL	4	3	1	0	239	8	1	2.01	.895	—	—	—	—	—	—	—	—
1981–82	Vancouver Canucks	NHL	28	8	14	5	1604	106	1	3.96	.862	—	—	—	—	—	—	—	—
1981–82	St. Louis Blues	NHL	2	0	1	0	76	8	0	6.33	.805	3	0	2	109	9	0	4.97	.845
1982–83	St. Louis Blues	NHL	14	3	8	1	671	50	0	4.47	.879	—	—	—	—	—	—	—	—
1982–83	New York Rangers	NHL	21	9	10	1	1167	67	0	3.45	.894	1	0	1	60	5	0	5.00	.894
1983–84	New York Rangers	NHL	50	28	14	4	2828	166	1	3.52	.890	5	2	3	308	13	1	2.53	.922
1984–85	New York Rangers	NHL	44	14	20	7	2506	175	0	4.19	.878	3	0	3	167	14	0	5.02	.859
1985–86	New York Rangers	NHL	23	5	12	1	1164	65	0	3.35	.893	3	0	0	74	6	0	4.89	.813
1985–86	New Haven Nighthawks	AHL	5	3	2	0	279	22	0	4.73	.869	—	—	—	—	—	—	—	—
1985–86	Adirondack Red Wings	AHL	10	5	4	1	605	33	0	3.27	.886	—	—	—	—	—	—	—	—
1986–87	Detroit Red Wings	NHL	36	11	16	5	1953	104	1	3.20	.893	8	5	2	464	13	2	1.68	.943
1987–88	Detroit Red Wings	NHL	47	22	17	5	2617	141	4	3.23	.891	8	4	3	431	22	1	3.07	.871
1988–89	Detroit Red Wings	NHL	39	13	14	8	2092	124	1	3.56	.882	2	0	1	78	7	0	5.35	.851
1989–90	Detroit Red Wings	NHL	45	15	18	5	2290	154	1	4.03	.867	—	—	—	—	—	—	—	—
1990–91	Detroit Red Wings	NHL	19	4	6	3	862	46	0	3.20	.895	—	—	—	—	—	—	—	—
1990–91	San Diego Gulls	IHL	11	4	6	0	603	39	0	3.88	—	—	—	—	—	—	—	—	—
NHL totals			476	167	202	61	25,975	1561	13	3.61	.884	35	11	15	1751	92	4	3.15	.894

=== NHL coaching record ===
Team	Year	Regular season							Postseason		
Team	Year	G	W	L	T	OTL	Pts	Finish	W	L	Result
WAS	2003–04	54	15	30	9	0	(59)	5th in Southeast	—	—	Missed playoffs
WAS	2005–06	82	29	41	—	12	70	5th in Southeast	—	—	Missed playoffs
WAS	2006–07	82	28	40	—	14	70	5th in Southeast	—	—	Missed playoffs
WAS	2007–08	21	6	14	—	1	(94)	5th in Southeast	—	—	(fired)
Total		219	78	125	9	27					

=== SM-Liiga coaching record ===
Team	Year	Regular season								Postseason		
Team	Year	G	W	OTW	L	T	OTL	Pts	Finish	W	L	Result
Jokerit	2008–09	58	28	4	20	—	6	98	4th in SM-liiga	1	4	lost in first round to Kärpät

== Awards and achievements ==
- WCHL First All-Star Team (1976 & 1977)
- WCHL Goaltender of the Year (1977)
- CHL Rookie of the Year (1978)
- CHL First All-Star Team (1978)
- Honoured Member of the Manitoba Hockey Hall of Fame

== See also ==
- List of NHL head coaches

Preceded by Bruce Cassidy	Head coach of the Washington Capitals; 2003–07	Succeeded by Bruce Boudreau
Preceded by Doug Shedden	Head coach of Jokerit; 2008–09	Succeeded by Hannu Aravirta
