= List of Washington Capitals head coaches =

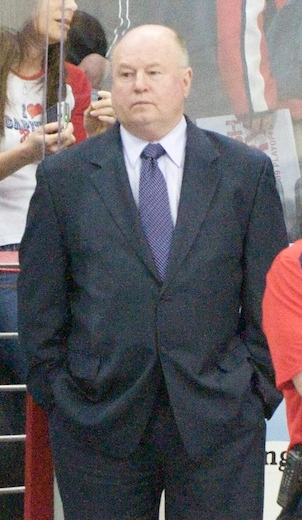
Bruce Boudreau was the head coach of the Capitals from 2007 through 2011.

The Washington Capitals are an American professional ice hockey team based in Washington, D.C. The Capitals play in the Metropolitan Division of the Eastern Conference in the National Hockey League (NHL). The team joined the NHL in 1974 as an expansion team and won their first Eastern Conference championship in 1998. The Capitals have played their home games at the Capital One Arena, formerly known as the MCI Center and Verizon Center, since 1997. The Capitals are owned by Ted Leonsis, and Brian MacLellan is their general manager.

There have been 20 head coaches for the Capitals franchise. The franchise's first head coach was Jim Anderson, who coached for less than a season. Bryan Murray is the franchise's all-time leader for the most regular-season games coached (672), the most regular-season game wins (343), the most regular-season points (769), the most playoff games coached (53), and the most playoff-game wins (24). Murray's brother, Terry, has also coached the Capitals, right after his brother Bryan. Roger Crozier, who only coached one game for the Capitals, is the franchise's all-time leader for the least regular-season game points (0). Ron Wilson won the Prince of Wales Trophy with the Capitals, but lost the 1998 Stanley Cup Final against the Detroit Red Wings. Bryan Murray, Bruce Boudreau, Barry Trotz and Spencer Carbery are the only Capitals coaches to have won the Jack Adams Award. None of the Capitals coaches have been elected into the Hockey Hall of Fame as a builder. Anderson, Danny Belisle, Gary Green, Crozier, Glen Hanlon, Dale Hunter, Adam Oates, and Spencer Carbery have spent their entire NHL head coaching careers with the Capitals.

Dale Hunter, who replaced Boudreau on November 28, 2011, resigned on May 14, 2012, citing personal reasons. Adam Oates was named the Capitals' 16th head coach on June 26, 2012. After having missed the playoffs for the second time in seven years, the Washington Capitals hired former Nashville Predators coach Barry Trotz on May 26, 2014. Trotz resigned as head coach in June 2018, after winning the Stanley Cup for the first time in the franchise's history. Later that same month, the team promoted Todd Reirden, a Capitals assistant coach since 2014, to the head coaching position.

On September 15, 2020, Peter Laviolette was named head coach. On April 14, 2023, Laviolette and the Capitals mutually agreed to part ways after the team missed the playoffs for the first time since the 2013–14 season and finished with a below-.500 win percentage. On May 30, 2023, Hershey Bears head coach Spencer Carbery was named Capitals head coach.

== Key ==
#	Number of coaches^{[a]}
GC	Games coached
W	Wins = 2 points
L	Losses = 0 points
T	Ties = 1 point
OT	Overtime/shootout losses = 1 point^{[b]}
PTS	Points
*	Spent entire NHL coaching career with the Capitals

== Coaches ==
Note: Statistics are correct through the 2025–26 season.

#	Name	Term^{[c]}	Regular season					Playoffs				Achievements	Reference
#	Name	Term^{[c]}	GC	W	L	T/OT	PTS	GC	W	L	Win%	Achievements	Reference
1	Jim Anderson*	1974–1975	54	4	45	5	13	—	—	—	—		
2	Red Sullivan	1975	18	2	16	0	4	—	—	—	—		
3	Milt Schmidt	1975–1975	44	5	34	5	15	—	—	—	—		
4	Tom McVie	1975–1978	204	49	122	33	131	—	—	—	—		
5	Danny Belisle*	1978–1979	96	28	51	17	73	—	—	—	—		
6	Gary Green*	1979–1981	157	50	78	29	129	—	—	—	—		
7	Roger Crozier*	1981	1	0	1	0	0	—	—	—	—		
8	Bryan Murray	1981–1990	672	343	246	83	769	53	24	29	.453	Jack Adams Award (1984)	
9	Terry Murray	1990–1994	325	163	134	28	354	39	18	21	.462		
10	Jim Schoenfeld	1994–1997	249	113	102	34	260	24	10	14	.417		
11	Ron Wilson	1997–2002	410	192	159	59	443	32	15	17	.469		
12	Bruce Cassidy	2002–2003	110	47	47	16	110	6	2	4	.333		
13	Glen Hanlon*	2003–2007	239	78	122	39	195	—	—	—	—		
14	Bruce Boudreau	2007–2011	329	201	88	40	442	37	17	20	.459	Presidents' Trophy (2010); Jack Adams Award (2008)	
15	Dale Hunter*	2011–2012	60	30	23	7	67	14	7	7	.500		
16	Adam Oates	2012–2014	130	65	48	17	147	7	3	4	.429		
17	Barry Trotz	2014–2018	328	205	89	34	444	63	36	27	.571	Stanley Cup champions (2018); Presidents' Trophy (2016, 2017); Jack Adams Award (2016)	
18	Todd Reirden*	2018–2020	151	89	46	16	194	15	5	10	.333		
19	Peter Laviolette	2020–2023	138	80	41	17	177	11	3	8	.273		
20	Spencer Carbery*	2023–present	246	134	83	29	297	14	5	9	.263	Jack Adams Award (2025)	

== Notes ==
- ^{a} A running total of the number of coaches of the Capitals. Thus, any coach who has two or more separate terms as head coach is only counted once.
- ^{b} Since the start of the 2005–06 season, the NHL has instituted a penalty shootout for regular season games that remained tied after a five-minute overtime period instead of ending in a tie.
- ^{c} Each year is linked to an article about that particular NHL season.
