= List of NHL players with 1,000 points =

As of completion of the 2025–26 season – the 108th regular season of play of the National Hockey League (NHL) – 103 different ice hockey players have scored at least 1,000 regular season points in their NHL career. All players who reach this mark receive the NHL Milestone Award; the award was introduced in 1982, and all who achieved the accomplishment prior to then were also granted the award.

A 1,000-point career was first achieved in the 44th year of the NHL (1960–61), when Gordie Howe scored his 1,000th point in his 938th game. The first (of only eight) defenceman to reach 1,000 points was Denis Potvin, playing in his 987th game during the 70th year of the NHL (1986–87).

== Season achievements ==
The 1997–98 NHL season saw the largest number of players (six) achieve their 1,000th point. A total of five players scored their 1,000th point in the 1990–91 season.

Beginning with Gordie Howe's achievement in 1960–61, and ignoring the cancelled (lockout) season of 2004–05, there have been 16 seasons in which no player happened to score their 1,000th career point. Of these 16, there were 6 seasons between Gordie Howe and the second player, Jean Beliveau, to make it to the 1,000-point mark. This most recently occurred in 2012–13 and 2013–14, a gap of two years and seven months between achievements.

On April 10, 2023, Claude Giroux of the Ottawa Senators and Joe Pavelski of the Dallas Stars both recorded their 1,000th career point. This was the first time in NHL history that two players scored their 1,000th point on the same day.

== Player achievements ==
The fewest NHL games required to reach the mark was 424, set by Wayne Gretzky. Second quickest was Mario Lemieux, achieving the mark in his 513th game. In a sense, Gretzky was the fastest and the second fastest, as he scored his second 1,000 points (the NHL's only player ever to score 2,000 points in regular-season play) only 433 games after scoring his first 1,000 points. Of the eight defensemen to score 1,000 points, the fewest NHL games required was 770, set by Paul Coffey.

The slowest player to achieve 1,000 points was Patrick Marleau with 1,349 games followed by Nicklas Lidstrom with 1,336.

Of the 100 players to score at least 1,000 points in their career, 59 reached the mark in fewer than 1,000 career games played.

Dave Andreychuk came closest to the statistical coincidence of scoring 1,000 points in exactly 1,000 games, scoring his 1,000th point in the 998th game he played.

Of those on the list, Brian Propp came closest to 'not' achieving 1,000 points — reaching the mark with only eight games remaining in his final NHL season. Lanny McDonald scored his 1,000th point with only ten games remaining in his final season. Jason Spezza came the closest to never reach 1,000 points, retiring just 5 short at 995.

Fourteen players could have made the list on assists alone. Wayne Gretzky, Ron Francis, Mark Messier, Ray Bourque, Paul Coffey, Adam Oates, Steve Yzerman, Jaromir Jagr, Gordie Howe, Marcel Dionne, Mario Lemieux, Joe Sakic, Joe Thornton, and Sidney Crosby have had at least 1,000 regular season assists in their NHL careers.

== Team achievements ==
A total of 24 different NHL franchises have had a player score their 1,000th point while playing for the franchise. Including three franchises that have changed cities, there have been 27 different teams that have celebrated a player's 1,000th point.

Seven players scored their 1,000th point while playing for the Detroit Red Wings, Pittsburgh Penguins, and Toronto Maple Leafs, and six have done so with the Boston Bruins, Chicago Blackhawks, and New York Rangers.

Only three times have multiple players reached 1,000 points on the same team in the same season. The Washington Capitals had three teammates score their career 1,000th point during the 1997–98 season—Adam Oates, Phil Housley and Dale Hunter. The Toronto Maple Leafs had two teammates, Doug Gilmour and Larry Murphy, achieve the mark during the 1995–96 season. The Ottawa Senators had two teammates, Daniel Alfredsson and Alexei Kovalev, reach the mark during the 2010–11 season.

== 1,000-point scorers ==
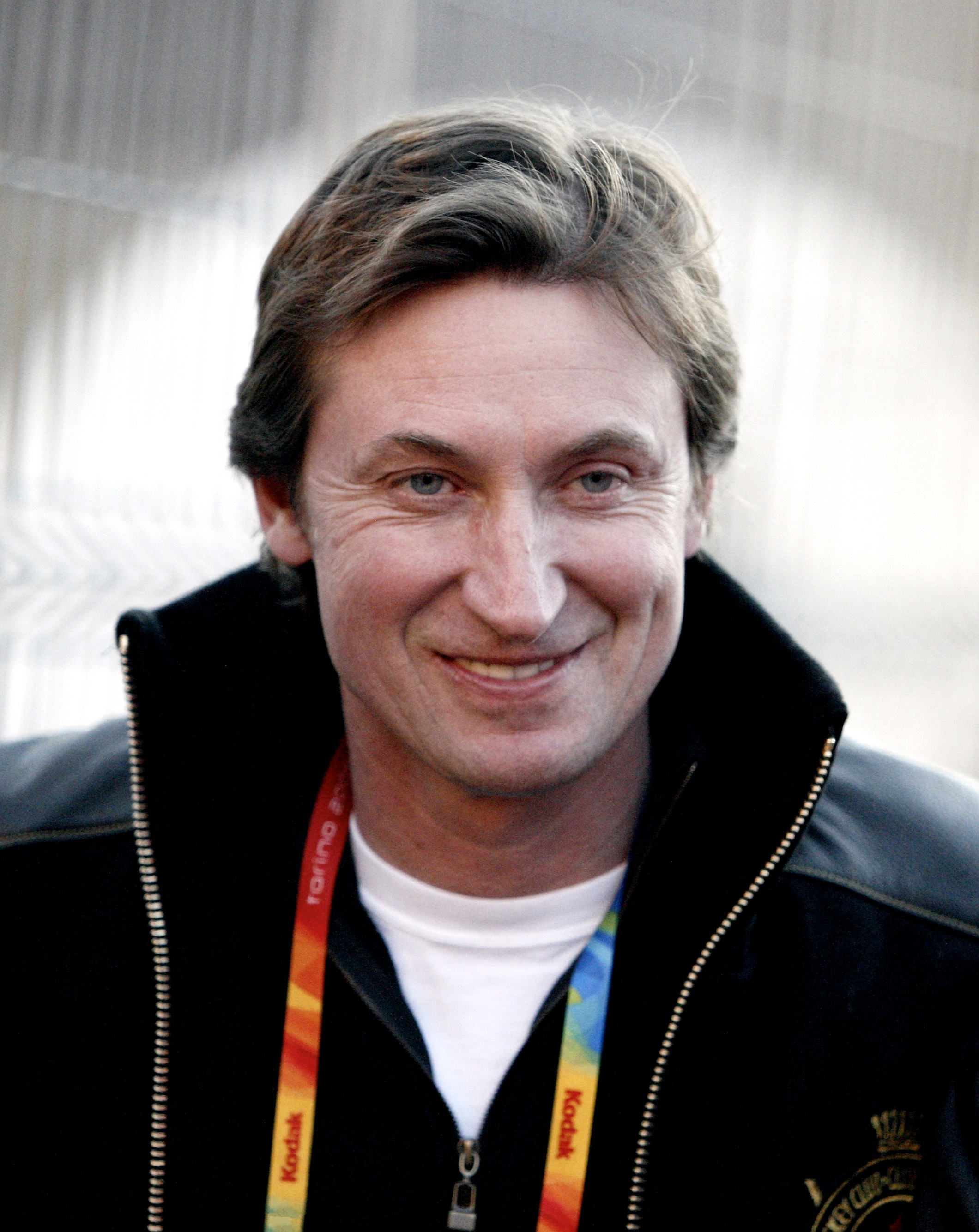
Wayne Gretzky is the NHL's all-time leader in points.

Legend
Team – Team for which the player scored 1,000th point
HHOF – Year of membership into the Hockey Hall of Fame (Note: after retirement there is a three year minimum waiting period)
Game No. – Number of career games played when 1,000th point was scored
Date – Date of 1,000th point
GP – Career games played
G – Career goals
A – Career assists
Pts – Career points
(D) – Defenceman

Active player, in NHL, is highlighted

(Table updated as of the end of the 2025–26 season)

Order reaching milestone	National team	Player	Team	HHOF	Game no.	Date	GP	G	A	Pts
18	(Canada)	Wayne Gretzky	Edmonton Oilers	1999	424 (Note: Wayne Gretzky scored his 2,000th point on October 26, 1990. This was in his 857th game overall and his 433rd since scoring 1,000.)	Dec 19, 1984	1,487	894	1,963	2,857
59	(Czech Republic)	Jaromir Jagr	Pittsburgh Penguins	Still active (ELH)	763	Dec 30, 2000	1,733	766	1,155	1,921
28	(Canada)	Mark Messier	Edmonton Oilers	2007	822	Jan 13, 1991	1,756	694	1,193	1,887
1	(Canada)	Gordie Howe	Detroit Red Wings	1972	938	Nov 27, 1960	1,767	801	1,049	1,850
38	(Canada)	Ron Francis	Pittsburgh Penguins	2007	893	Oct 28, 1993	1,731	549	1,249	1,798
13	(Canada)	Marcel Dionne	Los Angeles Kings	1992	740	Jan 7, 1981	1,348	731	1,040	1,771
86	(Canada)	Sidney Crosby	Pittsburgh Penguins	Still active	757	Feb 16, 2017	1,420	654	1,107	1,761
37	(Canada)	Steve Yzerman	Detroit Red Wings	2009	737	Feb 24, 1993	1,514	692	1,063	1,755
35	(Canada)	Mario Lemieux	Pittsburgh Penguins	1997	513	Mar 24, 1992	915	690	1,033	1,723
84	(Russia)	Alexander Ovechkin	Washington Capitals	Still active	880	Jan 11, 2017	1,573	929	758	1,687
56	(Canada)	Joe Sakic	Colorado Avalanche	2012	810	Dec 27, 1999	1,378	625	1,016	1,641
10	(Canada)	Phil Esposito	Boston Bruins	1984	745	Feb 15, 1974	1,282	717	873	1,590
34	(Canada)	Ray Bourque (D)	Boston Bruins	2004	933	Feb 29, 1992	1,612	410	1,169	1,579
78	(Canada)	Joe Thornton	San Jose Sharks	2025	994	Apr 8, 2011	1,714	430	1,109	1,539
60	(Canada)	Mark Recchi	Philadelphia Flyers	2017	920	Mar 13, 2001	1,652	577	956	1,533
27	(Canada)	Paul Coffey (D)	Pittsburgh Penguins	2004	770	Dec 22, 1990	1,409	396	1,135	1,531
6	(Canada) (Slovakia)	Stan Mikita	Chicago Black Hawks	1983	924	Oct 15, 1972	1,396	541	926	1,467
70	(Finland)	Teemu Selanne	Mighty Ducks of Anaheim	2017	928	Jan 30, 2006	1,451	684	773	1,457
19	(Canada)	Bryan Trottier	New York Islanders	1997	726	Jan 29, 1985	1,279	524	901	1,425
47	(Canada)	Adam Oates	Washington Capitals	2012	830	Oct 8, 1997	1,337	341	1,079	1,420
44	(Canada)	Doug Gilmour	Toronto Maple Leafs	2011	935	Dec 23, 1995	1,474	450	964	1,414
31	(Canada)	Dale Hawerchuk	Buffalo Sabres	2001	781	Mar 8, 1991	1,188	518	891	1,409
88	(Russia)	Evgeni Malkin	Pittsburgh Penguins	Still active	848	Mar 12, 2019	1,269	533	874	1,407
90	(United States)	Patrick Kane	Chicago Blackhawks	Still active	953	Jan 19, 2020	1,369	508	892	1,400
25	(Finland)	Jari Kurri	Edmonton Oilers	2001	716	Jan 2, 1990	1,251	601	797	1,398
51	(Canada)	Luc Robitaille	Los Angeles Kings	2009	882	Jan 29, 1998	1,431	668	726	1,394
53	(Canada) (United States)	Brett Hull	Dallas Stars	2009	815	Nov 14, 1998	1,269	741	650	1,391
64	(United States)	Mike Modano	Dallas Stars	2014	965	Nov 15, 2002	1,499	561	813	1,374
7	(Canada)	Johnny Bucyk	Boston Bruins	1981	1,144	Nov 9, 1972	1,540	556	813	1,369
62	(Canada)	Brendan Shanahan	Detroit Red Wings	2013	1,073	Jan 12, 2002	1,524	656	698	1,354
14	(Canada)	Guy Lafleur	Montreal Canadiens	1988	720	Mar 4, 1981	1,126	560	793	1,353
66	(Sweden)	Mats Sundin	Toronto Maple Leafs	2012	994	Mar 10, 2003	1,346	564	785	1,349
26	(Canada)	Denis Savard	Chicago Blackhawks	2000	727	Mar 11, 1990	1,196	473	865	1,338
46	(Canada)	Dave Andreychuk	New Jersey Devils	2017	998	Apr 7, 1996	1,639	640	698	1,338
33	(Canada)	Mike Gartner	New York Rangers	2001	971	Jan 4, 1992	1,432	708	627	1,335
55	(Canada)	Pierre Turgeon	St. Louis Blues	2023	881	Oct 9, 1999	1,294	515	812	1,327
16	(Canada)	Gilbert Perreault	Buffalo Sabres	1990	871	Apr 3, 1982	1,191	512	814	1,326
91	(Slovenia)	Anze Kopitar	Los Angeles Kings	Eligible 2029	1,124	May 5, 2021	1,521	452	864	1,316
77	(Canada)	Jarome Iginla	Calgary Flames	2020	1,103	Apr 1, 2011	1,554	625	675	1,300
3	(Canada)	Alex Delvecchio	Detroit Red Wings	1977	1,143	Feb 16, 1969	1,550	456	825	1,281
52	(Canada)	Al MacInnis (D)	St. Louis Blues	2007	1,056	Apr 7, 1998	1,416	340	934	1,274
12	(Canada)	Jean Ratelle	Boston Bruins	1985	1,007	Apr 3, 1977	1,280	491	776	1,267
95	(Canada)	Steven Stamkos	Tampa Bay Lightning	Still active	945	Dec 1, 2022	1,246	624	632	1,256
24	(Czechoslovakia) (Slovakia) (Canada)	Peter Stastny	Quebec Nordiques	1998	682	Oct 19, 1989	977	450	789	1,239
48	(United States)	Phil Housley (D)	Washington Capitals	2015	1,081	Nov 8, 1997	1,495	338	894	1,232
5	(Canada)	Norm Ullman	Toronto Maple Leafs	1982	1,113	Oct 16, 1971	1,410	490	739	1,229
99	(Canada)	Connor McDavid	Edmonton Oilers	Still active	659	Nov 14, 2024	794	409	811	1,220
2	(Canada)	Jean Beliveau	Montreal Canadiens	1972	911	Mar 3, 1968	1,125	507	712	1,219
45	(Canada)	Larry Murphy (D)	Toronto Maple Leafs	2004	1,228	Mar 27, 1996	1,615	288	929	1,217
63	(United States)	Jeremy Roenick	Philadelphia Flyers	2024	961	Jan 30, 2002	1,363	513	703	1,216
15	(Canada)	Bobby Clarke	Philadelphia Flyers	1987	922	Mar 19, 1981	1,144	358	852	1,210
39	(Canada)	Bernie Nicholls	New Jersey Devils	—	858	Feb 13, 1994	1,127	475	734	1,209
58	(Canada)	Vincent Damphousse	San Jose Sharks	—	1,090	Oct 14, 2000	1,378	432	773	1,205
40	(Canada)	Dino Ciccarelli	Detroit Red Wings	2010	957	Mar 9, 1994	1,232	608	592	1,200
83	(Canada)	Patrick Marleau	San Jose Sharks	—	1,349	Nov 21, 2015	1,779	566	631	1,197
98	(Canada)	John Tavares	Toronto Maple Leafs	Still active	1,054	Dec 11, 2023	1,266	525	660	1,185
71	(Canada)	Rod Brind'Amour	Carolina Hurricanes	—	1,202	Nov 4, 2006	1,484	452	732	1,184
67	(Russia)	Sergei Fedorov	Mighty Ducks of Anaheim	2015	965	Feb 14, 2004	1,248	483	696	1,179
4	(Canada)	Bobby Hull	Chicago Black Hawks	1983	909	Dec 13, 1970	1,063	610	560	1,170
96	(Canada)	Claude Giroux	Ottawa Senators	Still active	1,099	Apr 10, 2023	1,345	379	786	1,165
75	(Sweden)	Daniel Alfredsson	Ottawa Senators	2022	1,009	Oct 22, 2010	1,246	444	713	1,157
30	(Canada)	Michel Goulet	Chicago Blackhawks	1998	878	Feb 23, 1991	1,089	548	605	1,153
100	(Canada)	Nathan MacKinnon	Colorado Avalanche	Still active	856	Mar 10, 2025	950	420	722	1,142
74	(Sweden)	Nicklas Lidstrom (D)	Detroit Red Wings	2015	1,336	Oct 15, 2009	1,564	264	878	1,142
80	(Slovakia)	Marian Hossa	Chicago Blackhawks	2020	1,100	Oct 30, 2014	1,309	525	609	1,134
22	(Canada)	Bernie Federko	St. Louis Blues	2002	855	Mar 19, 1988	1,000	369	761	1,130
20	(Canada)	Mike Bossy	New York Islanders	1991	656	Jan 24, 1986	752	573	553	1,126
65	(Canada)	Joe Nieuwendyk	New Jersey Devils	2011	1,094	Feb 23, 2003	1,257	564	562	1,126
101	(Russia)	Nikita Kucherov	Tampa Bay Lightning	Still active	809	Oct 25, 2025	879	401	723	1,124
17	(Canada)	Darryl Sittler	Philadelphia Flyers	1989	927	Jan 20, 1983	1,096	484	637	1,121
8	(Canada)	Frank Mahovlich	Montreal Canadiens	1981	1,090	Feb 17, 1973	1,181	533	570	1,103
36	(Canada)	Glenn Anderson	Toronto Maple Leafs	2008	954	Feb 22, 1993	1,129	498	601	1,099
61	(Canada)	Theoren Fleury	New York Rangers	—	960	Oct 29, 2001	1,084	455	633	1,088
85	(Sweden)	Henrik Sedin	Vancouver Canucks	2022	1,213	Jan 20, 2017	1,330	240	830	1,070
29	(Canada)	Dave Taylor	Los Angeles Kings	—	930	Feb 5, 1991	1,111	431	638	1,069
97	(United States)	Joe Pavelski	Dallas Stars	Eligible 2027	1,248	Apr 10, 2023	1,332	476	592	1,068
72	(United States)	Keith Tkachuk	St. Louis Blues	2026	1,077	Nov 30, 2008	1,201	538	527	1,065
79	(Canada)	Ray Whitney	Phoenix Coyotes	—	1,226	Mar 31, 2012	1,330	385	679	1,064
89	(Canada)	Eric Staal	Minnesota Wild	—	1,208	Dec 15, 2019	1,365	455	608	1,063
42	(United States)	Joe Mullen	Pittsburgh Penguins	2000	935	Feb 7, 1995	1,062	502	561	1,063
57	(Canada)	Pat Verbeek	Detroit Red Wings	—	1,275	Feb 27, 2000	1,424	522	540	1,062
103	(Germany)	Leon Draisaitl	Edmonton Oilers	Still active	824	Dec 16, 2025	855	434	619	1,053
21	(Canada)	Denis Potvin (D)	New York Islanders	1991	987	Apr 4, 1987	1,060	310	742	1,052
9	(Canada)	Henri Richard	Montreal Canadiens	1979	1,194	Dec 20, 1973	1,258	358	688	1,046
87	(Sweden)	Daniel Sedin	Vancouver Canucks	2022	1,251	Nov 30, 2017	1,306	393	648	1,041
94	(Canada)	Patrice Bergeron	Boston Bruins	2026	1,235	Nov 21, 2022	1,294	427	613	1,040
32	(Canada)	Bobby Smith	Minnesota North Stars	—	986	Nov 30, 1991	1,077	357	679	1,036
102	(Canada)	Brad Marchand	Florida Panthers	Still active	1,116	Nov 13, 2025	1,152	451	583	1,034
73	(United States)	Doug Weight	New York Islanders	—	1,168	Jan 2, 2009	1,238	278	755	1,033
81	(Canada)	Martin St. Louis	New York Rangers	2018	1,082	Nov 28, 2014	1,134	391	642	1,033
93	(Sweden)	Nicklas Backstrom	Washington Capitals	Still active (SHL)	1,037	Mar 9, 2022	1,105	271	762	1,033
68	(Russia)	Alexander Mogilny	Toronto Maple Leafs	2025	946	Mar 15, 2004	990	473	559	1,032
76	(Russia)	Alexei Kovalev	Ottawa Senators	—	1,249	Nov 22, 2010	1,316	430	599	1,029
69	(United States)	Brian Leetch (D)	Boston Bruins	2009	1,151	Oct 18, 2005	1,205	247	781	1,028
82	(Czech Republic)	Patrik Elias	New Jersey Devils	—	1,187	Jan 6, 2015	1,240	408	617	1,025
54	(Canada)	Brian Bellows	Washington Capitals	—	1,147	Jan 2, 1999	1,188	485	537	1,022
11	(Canada)	Rod Gilbert	New York Rangers	1982	1,027	Feb 19, 1977	1,065	406	615	1,021
49	(Canada)	Dale Hunter	Washington Capitals	—	1,308	Jan 9, 1998	1,407	323	697	1,020
92	(Canada)	Ryan Getzlaf	Anaheim Ducks	—	1,118	Nov 16, 2021	1,157	282	737	1,019
50	(United States)	Pat LaFontaine	New York Rangers	2003	847	Jan 22, 1998	865	468	545	1,013
43	(Canada)	Steve Larmer	New York Rangers	—	983	Mar 8, 1995	1,006	441	571	1,012
23	(Canada)	Lanny McDonald	Calgary Flames	1992	1,101	Mar 7, 1989	1,111	500	506	1,006
41	(Canada)	Brian Propp	Hartford Whalers	—	1,008	Mar 19, 1994	1,016	425	579	1,004

== 1,000th point scored during the 2026–27 NHL season ==
Players with 1,000th NHL point in the 2026–27 NHL season
Order reaching milestone	National team	Player	Team	Game no.	Date
104	(Canada)	Jamie Benn	Dallas Stars	1,271	Nov 14, 2026

== Active players within 100 points ==
The following players are within 100 points of reaching 1,000 career points, as of the end of the 2025–26 season.

Player	Team	GP	G	A	Pts
Corey Perry	Los Angeles Kings	1,464	465	507	972
Artemi Panarin	Los Angeles Kings	830	330	624	954
Brent Burns (D)	Colorado Avalanche	1,579	273	672	945
Matt Duchene	Dallas Stars	1,195	387	549	936
Erik Karlsson (D)	Pittsburgh Penguins	1,159	215	721	936
David Pastrnak	Boston Bruins	833	420	513	933
Mark Scheifele	Winnipeg Jets	961	372	535	907

== Retired players within 100 points ==
These are players who are now retired that came within 100 points of reaching 1,000 for their career. They are listed with the NHL team for which they played the most games.

Player	Team	Final season	HHOF	GP	G	A	Pts
Jason Spezza	Ottawa Senators	2021–22	—	1,248	363	632	995
Phil Kessel	Toronto Maple Leafs	2022–23 (Note: Last played in 2022–23 but has not officially retired.)	–	1,286	413	579	992
Paul Kariya	Mighty Ducks of Anaheim	2009–10	2017	989	402	587	989
Rick Middleton	Boston Bruins	1987–88	—	1,005	448	540	988
Dave Keon	Toronto Maple Leafs	1981–82	1986	1,296	396	590	986
Andy Bathgate	New York Rangers	1970–71	1978	1,069	349	624	973
Shane Doan	Arizona Coyotes	2016–17	—	1,540	402	570	972
Maurice Richard	Montreal Canadiens	1959–60	1961	978	544	422	966
Henrik Zetterberg	Detroit Red Wings	2017–18	—	1,082	337	623	960
Kirk Muller	New Jersey Devils	2002–03	—	1,349	357	602	959
Larry Robinson (D)	Montreal Canadiens	1991–92	1995	1,384	208	750	958
Rick Tocchet	Philadelphia Flyers	2001–02	—	1,144	440	512	952
Vincent Lecavalier	Tampa Bay Lightning	2015–16	—	1,212	421	528	949
Chris Chelios (D)	Chicago Blackhawks	2009–10	2013	1,651	185	763	948
Blake Wheeler	Winnipeg Jets	2023–24	Eligible 2027	1,172	321	622	943
Jason Arnott	New Jersey Devils	2011–12	—	1,244	417	521	938
Steve Thomas	Toronto Maple Leafs	2003–04	—	1,235	421	512	933
Brad Richards	Tampa Bay Lightning	2015–16	—	1,126	298	634	932
Neal Broten	Minnesota North Stars	1996–97	—	1,099	289	634	923
Pavel Datsyuk	Detroit Red Wings	2015–16	2024	953	314	604	918
Bobby Orr (D)	Boston Bruins	1978–79	1979	657	270	645	915
Jonathan Toews	Chicago Blackhawks	2025–26	Eligible 2029	1,149	383	529	912
Gary Roberts	Calgary Flames	2008–09	—	1,224	438	472	910
Scott Stevens (D)	New Jersey Devils	2003–04	2007	1,635	196	712	908
Tony Amonte	Chicago Blackhawks	2006–07	—	1,174	416	484	900
