= Ron Francis =

Canadian ice hockey player (born 1963)

- Hockey Hall of Fame, 2007
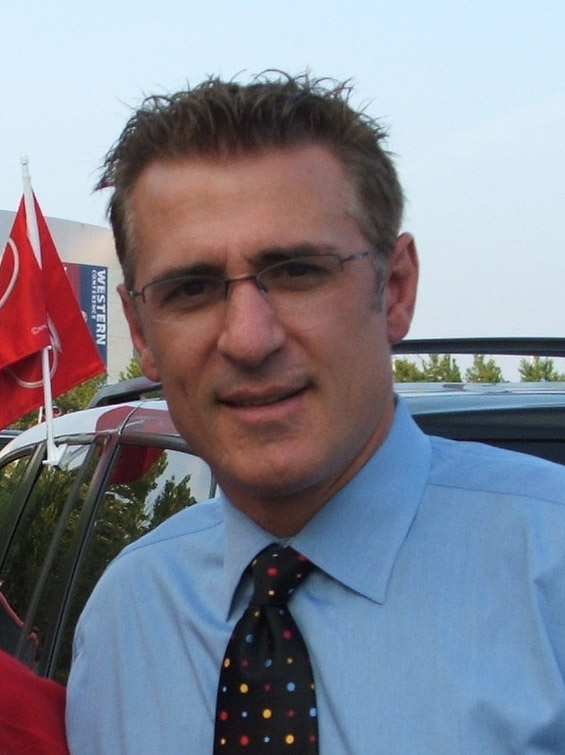
- Francis in 2006
- Born: March 1, 1963 (age 63) Sault Ste. Marie, Ontario, Canada
- Height: 6 ft 3 in (191 cm)
- Weight: 200 lb (91 kg; 14 st 4 lb)
- Position: Centre
- Shot: Left
- Played for: Hartford Whalers; Pittsburgh Penguins; Carolina Hurricanes; Toronto Maple Leafs
- National team: Canada
- NHL draft: 4th overall, 1981; Hartford Whalers
- Playing career: 1981–2004

Ronald Michael Francis Jr. (born March 1, 1963) is a Canadian former professional ice hockey player and current executive in the National Hockey League (NHL). He played 23 seasons for the Hartford Whalers, Pittsburgh Penguins, Carolina Hurricanes, and Toronto Maple Leafs. He currently serves as a special advisor in hockey operations for the Pittsburgh Penguins.

Drafted fourth overall in the 1981 NHL entry draft, Francis quickly became a star for the Whalers, where he served as captain from 1985 to 1990 before he was part of a blockbuster trade to the Pittsburgh Penguins. He would play the next seven years with the team and served as a key part of consecutive Stanley Cup championships in 1991 and 1992 while being awarded the Frank J. Selke Trophy in 1995 and winning the Lady Byng Memorial Trophy for his sportsmanship in 1995, 1998, and 2003. He signed as a free agent with the Carolina Hurricanes prior to the 1998–99 season and became team captain in 1999, which saw him awarded the King Clancy Memorial Trophy for his leadership in 2002, the same year when he became only the fifth player in NHL history with both 500 goals and 1,000 assists. He was traded late in the 2003–04 season to the Maple Leafs, where he played his final games. A few months after the end of the 2004–05 NHL lockout, he announced his retirement as a player. A consistent playmaker, Francis retired at the time as second in career assists (1,249), behind only Wayne Gretzky; fourth in career points (1,798); third in games played (1,731); and 19th in career goals (549). Carolina retired his number 10 jersey in 2006, the first Hurricane to receive the honor in franchise history.

In 2006, Francis was hired by the Carolina Hurricanes as director of player development and rose to director of hockey operations in 2011 and had minority ownership of the team the following year. He was promoted to general manager of the team in 2014 to succeed Jim Rutherford. In March 2018, it was announced that he would transition from general manager to president of hockey operations, before being fired the following month. On July 18, 2019, he was hired as the first general manager of the Seattle Kraken. He was promoted to president of hockey operations in 2025 before he announced that he would step down at the conclusion of the 2025–26 season. He was hired by the Penguins in 2026.

In 2017, Francis was named one of the 100 Greatest NHL Players in the first 100 years of the league.

== Early life ==
Francis was born in Sault Ste. Marie, Ontario to Lorita and Ron Francis Sr. For the first ten years of his life, the Francis family lived in an apartment near a steel mill (his father worked in a steel plant for over 40 years) on Albert Street, where he played street hockey. As a youth, Francis played in the 1975 and 1976 Quebec International Pee-Wee Hockey Tournaments with a minor ice hockey team from Sault Ste. Marie, Ontario.

Francis played in the Ontario Minor Hockey Association with his hometown North Stars. Prior to the 1980 Ontario Hockey League draft, Francis actually planned to go to Cornell University. The Sault Ste. Marie Greyhounds, as coached by Terry Crisp with general manager Sam McMaster, told Francis they would draft him in the second round and were persuasive enough (which also coincided with a Cornell coaching shakeup) to have Francis changed his mind and play for the Greyhounds. As a rookie in the OHL in the 1980–81 season, he had 25 goals with 43 assists in 64 games. He was selected in the NHL draft later that year but played for the Greyhounds for 25 games prior to being called up, which saw him have 48 points; in total, he had 117 points in 89 games for the team. He had his number 10 jersey retired by the Greyhounds. In 2026, he was selected as one of the Top 50 Players of the Last 50 Years for the 50th anniversary of the Canadian Hockey League.

== Playing career ==
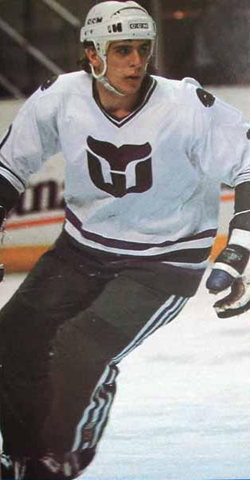
Francis with the Hartford Whalers in 1983

In the 1981 NHL entry draft, the Hartford Whalers were actually planning on drafting center Bobby Carpenter. However, the Washington Capitals made a trade to go from behind the Whalers to the pick above them in order to select Carpenter, which left the Whalers deciding to draft Francis with the fourth overall pick in the 1981 NHL entry draft. He was selected to the NHL All-Star Game in 1983 and 1985, with the latter making history for the franchise as making him the first Whaler to play in the NHL All-Star Game twice. Francis wore an eyeshield for most of his career due to an injury he suffered in his rookie season where a deflected slapshot hit his left eye hard enough to deflect the puck into the net for a goal; his eyes were patched shut and treated with medication that led to a full recovery, although a subsequent check on it years after his playing career led to him taking treatment for the eye with a steroid drop.

Francis played almost ten seasons with the Whalers, serving as captain for almost six and setting nearly every offensive record in franchise history. In the 1990–91 season, he was both stripped of his captaincy (done on December 7th by head coach Rick Ley) and traded. He was traded to the Pittsburgh Penguins on March 4, 1991, with Ulf Samuelsson and Grant Jennings, in exchange for Jeff Parker, Zarley Zalapski, and John Cullen. The trade became a coup for Pittsburgh, where he centred a formidable second line behind Mario Lemieux, as the Penguins won their first Stanley Cup less than three months later. The threat posed by the Francis-centered second line, formidable in its own right, often required opposing teams to throw their best defenseman against two lines, instead of zeroing in on Lemieux's line, thus creating more opportunities for both top lines. Francis was also known as one of the best face-off men in the NHL in this period, in both the offensive and defensive ends. In power-play and empty-net situations, his key face-off wins often led to Penguin goals.

Francis missed the first nine games of the 1991–92 season as a free agent. Three weeks into the season, Francis and the Penguins came to an agreement that would see him sign a five-year deal worth $4.1 million. Francis was indispensable the following year, as Pittsburgh repeated as champions, in leading the team during the absence of Lemieux in the 1992 playoffs – and in scoring the Cup-clinching goal against the Chicago Blackhawks. At the same time, the trade that brought him to Pittsburgh is considered to be one of the most one-sided trades in NHL history (though The Hockey News suggested that Hartford had gotten the better end of the trade at the time); the players Hartford acquired never approached the numbers or impact Francis produced there or with Pittsburgh. Francis would spend seven seasons in Pittsburgh, captaining the team twice, and becoming the first Penguin to win the Selke Trophy after the 1994–95 season, which he did while winning the Lady Byng Trophy with 48 assists in 44 games of the strike-shortened season. Francis had his best season in points with the 1995–96 season, recording a league-leading 92 assists for 119 points.

With no offer coming from the Penguins in the 1998 offseason, Francis returned to his original organization as a free agent for the 1998–99 season, signing with the Carolina Hurricanes, who had moved from Hartford the previous season on a four-year deal worth over $20 million. He would play for nearly six seasons with the Hurricanes. He captained the Hurricanes to a surprise appearance in the 2002 Stanley Cup Final and scored the winning goal for the Hurricanes in overtime of game one, before losing the next four games and the series to the heavily favoured Detroit Red Wings.

Francis was traded in March 2004 to the Toronto Maple Leafs after he waived his no-trade clause. He departed the Whalers/Hurricanes as the all-time leader for goals, points, assists, and games played, with all of these marks still being records as of 2026. He recorded 10 points in 12 games as the Leafs lost in the second round of the 2004 Stanley Cup playoffs; these turned out to be the last games Francis played, as the 2004–05 season was not played due to the NHL lockout.

On September 14, 2005, Francis announced his retirement, stating, "I think you always hope you can play forever, but you always realize that time will come. I was fortunate I was able to make a decision, move on and do it comfortably."

== Management career ==
In 2006, Francis was hired by the Carolina Hurricanes as director of player development and assumed the position of director of hockey operations in 2011. One year later, as part of Playmakers Management, LLC, he became an ownership partner with the team. He was named general manager of the team in 2014. During his four years as general manager, the Hurricanes went through a re-build that granted them a handful of draft picks but failed to break their postseason drought (which reached nine years in 2018).

On March 7, 2018, Francis was announced to be transitioned away from general manager to president hockey operations by new Hurricanes' majority owner Thomas Dundon. His Hurricanes contract was terminated on April 30, 2018. On July 18, 2019, Francis was named the first general manager of the Seattle Kraken. On April 22, 2025, Francis would be promoted to president of hockey operations by the Kraken. One year later, on April 8, 2026, Francis announced that he would step down from the Kraken at the conclusion of the 2025–26 season. On June 19, 2026, the Pittsburgh Penguins announced the hiring of Francis as Special Advisor, Hockey Operations, who would report to the leadership group in operations with planning and counsel.

== Personal life ==
Francis was born in Sault Ste. Marie, Ontario, Canada. He is second cousins with Mike Liut.

Francis is married to Mary Lou Robie, a native of Stamford, Connecticut, whom he met in Hartford during his tenure with the Whalers. They married in 1986 and have three children: Kaitlyn (b. 1991), Michael (b. 1993), and Connor (b. 1996). Francis is considered a popular sports figure in Hartford, Pittsburgh and Raleigh, and is also noted for his humanitarian and charity work. Francis also has the distinction of being the first ice hockey player inducted into the North Carolina Sports Hall of Fame.

== Legacy ==
Francis was a model of consistency and durability as a player averaging more than a point a game in over 1,700 games in 23 seasons. With the exception of the lockout-shortened 1994–95 season, Francis averaged just under 77 games played a season. Francis stands second all-time in career assists behind Wayne Gretzky with 1,249, fifth in career points (1,798), third in games played (1,731), and twenty-sixth in career goals (549). He was just the second NHL player to have 20 seasons of 20+ goals each and the first since Gordie Howe.

Playing in an era with stars such as Wayne Gretzky, Mario Lemieux and others, Francis never won the Hart Memorial Trophy, but his gentlemanly conduct on and off the ice led to Francis being awarded the Lady Byng Trophy three times.

In 2003, Francis was named to the Penguins Ring of Honor, a mural that honored members of the Millenium Team for public display on the front surface of the press box at Pittsburgh Civic Arena. On January 6, 2006, Francis was honored as part of Whalers Appreciation Night at the Hartford Civic Center prior to the hockey game played by the Hartford Wolf Pack of the American Hockey League, who raised a banner honoring Francis and his number 10 jersey that he wore in Hartford (Ulf Samuelsson's number 5 and Kevin Dineen's number 11 were also honored that same night). On January 28, his number 10 jersey was retired by the Carolina organization.

On June 28, 2007, Francis was selected to enter the Hockey Hall of Fame in his first year on the ballot. He was formally inducted on November 12, 2007. In 2025, he was inducted into the Pittsburgh Penguins Hall of Fame.

== Career statistics ==
=== Regular season and playoffs ===
			Regular season					Playoffs
Season	Team	League	GP	G	A	Pts	PIM	GP	G	A	Pts	PIM
1979–80	Sault Ste. Marie North Stars	Midget	45	57	92	149	—	—	11	11	22	—
1980–81	Sault Ste. Marie Greyhounds	OHL	64	26	43	69	33	19	7	8	15	34
1981–82	Sault Ste. Marie Greyhounds	OHL	25	18	30	48	46	—	—	—	—	—
1981–82	Hartford Whalers	NHL	59	25	43	68	51	—	—	—	—	—
1982–83	Hartford Whalers	NHL	79	31	59	90	60	—	—	—	—	—
1983–84	Hartford Whalers	NHL	72	23	60	83	45	—	—	—	—	—
1984–85	Hartford Whalers	NHL	80	24	57	81	66	—	—	—	—	—
1985–86	Hartford Whalers	NHL	53	24	53	77	24	10	1	2	3	4
1986–87	Hartford Whalers	NHL	75	30	63	93	45	6	2	2	4	6
1987–88	Hartford Whalers	NHL	80	25	50	75	87	6	2	5	7	2
1988–89	Hartford Whalers	NHL	69	29	48	77	36	4	0	2	2	0
1989–90	Hartford Whalers	NHL	80	32	69	101	73	7	3	3	6	8
1990–91	Hartford Whalers	NHL	67	21	55	76	51	—	—	—	—	—
1990–91	Pittsburgh Penguins	NHL	14	2	9	11	21	24	7	10	17	24
1991–92	Pittsburgh Penguins	NHL	70	21	33	54	30	21	8	19	27	6
1992–93	Pittsburgh Penguins	NHL	84	24	76	100	68	12	6	11	17	19
1993–94	Pittsburgh Penguins	NHL	82	27	66	93	62	6	0	2	2	6
1994–95	Pittsburgh Penguins	NHL	44	11	48	59	18	12	6	13	19	4
1995–96	Pittsburgh Penguins	NHL	77	27	92	119	56	11	3	6	9	4
1996–97	Pittsburgh Penguins	NHL	81	27	63	90	20	5	1	2	3	2
1997–98	Pittsburgh Penguins	NHL	81	25	62	87	20	6	1	5	6	2
1998–99	Carolina Hurricanes	NHL	82	21	31	52	34	3	0	1	1	0
1999–00	Carolina Hurricanes	NHL	78	23	50	73	18	—	—	—	—	—
2000–01	Carolina Hurricanes	NHL	82	15	50	65	32	3	0	0	0	0
2001–02	Carolina Hurricanes	NHL	80	27	50	77	18	23	6	10	16	6
2002–03	Carolina Hurricanes	NHL	82	22	35	57	30	—	—	—	—	—
2003–04	Carolina Hurricanes	NHL	68	10	20	30	14	—	—	—	—	—
2003–04	Toronto Maple Leafs	NHL	12	3	7	10	0	12	0	4	4	2
NHL totals			1,731	549	1,249	1,798	979	171	46	97	143	95

=== International ===
Year	Team	Event	GP	G	A	Pts	PIM
1985	Canada	WC	10	2	5	7	2
Senior totals			10	2	5	7	2

== Awards and achievements ==
- NHL All-Star Game – 1983, 1985, 1990, 1996
- Stanley Cup champion – 1991, 1992
- NHL Plus-Minus Award – 1995
- Frank J. Selke Trophy – 1995
- Lady Byng Trophy – 1995, 1998, 2002
- King Clancy Memorial Trophy – 2002
- Inducted into the Hockey Hall of Fame in 2007

NHL career records as of the end of the 2026 NHL season:

- 5th most points with 1,798
- 31st most goals with 549
- 2nd most assists with 1,249
- 5th most games played with 1,731

== See also ==
- List of NHL statistical leaders
- List of NHL players with 1,000 points
- Notable families in the NHL
- List of NHL players with 500 goals
- List of NHL players with 100 point seasons
- List of NHL career assists leaders
- List of NHL players with 1,000 games played

Sporting positions
Preceded by Mark Johnson	Hartford Whalers captain 1985–1990	Succeeded by Randy Ladouceur
Preceded by Mario Lemieux	Pittsburgh Penguins captain 1995	Succeeded by Mario Lemieux
Preceded by Mario Lemieux	Pittsburgh Penguins captain 1997–1998	Succeeded by Jaromír Jágr
Preceded by Keith Primeau	Carolina Hurricanes captain 1999–2004	Succeeded by Rod Brind'Amour
Preceded by Jim Rutherford	Carolina Hurricanes general manager 2014–2018	Succeeded by Don Waddell
Preceded by Position created	Seattle Kraken general manager 2019–2025	Succeeded by Jason Botterill
Awards and achievements
Preceded by Fred Arthur	Hartford Whalers first-round draft pick 1981	Succeeded by Paul Lawless
Preceded by Wayne Gretzky; Paul Kariya; Joe Sakic	Winner of the Lady Byng Memorial Trophy; 1995; 1998; 2002	Succeeded by Paul Kariya; Wayne Gretzky; Alexander Mogilny
Preceded by Sergei Fedorov	Winner of the Frank J. Selke Trophy; 1995	Succeeded by Sergei Fedorov
Preceded by Scott Stevens	Winner of the NHL Plus/Minus Award; 1995	Succeeded by Vladimir Konstantinov
Preceded by Shjon Podein	Winner of the King Clancy Memorial Trophy; 2002	Succeeded by Brendan Shanahan
