= Dale Hunter =

Canadian ice hockey player (b. 1960)

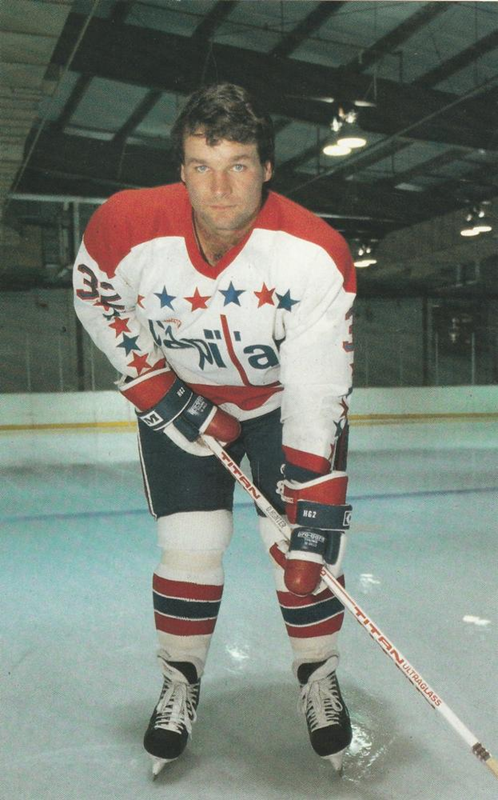
- Hunter with the Washington Capitals in 1987
- Born: July 31, 1960 (age 66) Petrolia, Ontario, Canada
- Height: 5 ft 10 in (178 cm)
- Weight: 200 lb (91 kg; 14 st 4 lb)
- Position: Centre
- Shot: Left
- Played for: Quebec Nordiques; Washington Capitals; Colorado Avalanche
- NHL draft: 41st overall, 1979; Quebec Nordiques
- Playing career: 1980–1999

Dale Robert Hunter (born July 31, 1960) is a Canadian junior ice hockey executive and former player. He played as a centre in the National Hockey League (NHL) for 19 seasons with the Quebec Nordiques, Washington Capitals, and the Colorado Avalanche. He is currently the co-owner, president, and head coach of the London Knights of the Ontario Hockey League. Formerly, he was the head coach of the Capitals.

Drafted as the 41st overall pick in the 1979 draft by the Quebec Nordiques, he started his NHL career in the 1980–81 season and immediately became noted for his combination of intimidation and skill, which saw him start out with six consecutive seasons with at least 200 penalty minutes. He was traded to the Capitals prior to the 1987–88 season, becoming team captain in 1994. His rough play became most infamous in the 1993 playoffs when he issued an illegal check on Pierre Turgeon after a goal that saw Hunter suspended 21 games for what was a league record for violent play. He recorded his 1,000th point in the 1997–98 season, his final full season with Washington before he was traded midway through the following year to Colorado prior to his retirement in 1999. He retired with 1,020 points in 1,407 games while recording 3,565 penalty minutes to become the first (and so far only) player with 1,000 points and 3,000 penalty minutes in NHL history. He also recorded 731 penalty minutes in the Stanley Cup playoffs, a league record. His jersey was retired by the Capitals in 2000.

After his playing career ended, he made a bid with his brother and others to buy the London Knights that saw him become team president and head coach in 2001. He departed the team to become head coach of the Capitals in the 2011–12 season, but he stepped down at the close of the season to return to the Knights. With London, he has led them to Memorial Cup championships in 2005, 2016, and 2025; he is currently the all-time winningest coach in the Memorial Cup and one of only two coaches with three Memorial Cup victories.

== Early life ==
Hunter was born in Petrolia, Ontario, but grew up in nearby (13 km) Oil Springs, Ontario on a farm. He is the middle of three Hunter brothers, with older brother Dave and younger brother Mark each playing in the NHL.

He played junior hockey with the Strathroy Blades before joining the Kitchener Rangers of the Ontario Major Junior Hockey League in 1977. He was treaded to the Sudbury Wolves after one season, where he quickly excelled, recording 110 points in his first season. In 2014, the Wolves retired his number 15 jersey.

== NHL career ==
=== Quebec Nordiques ===
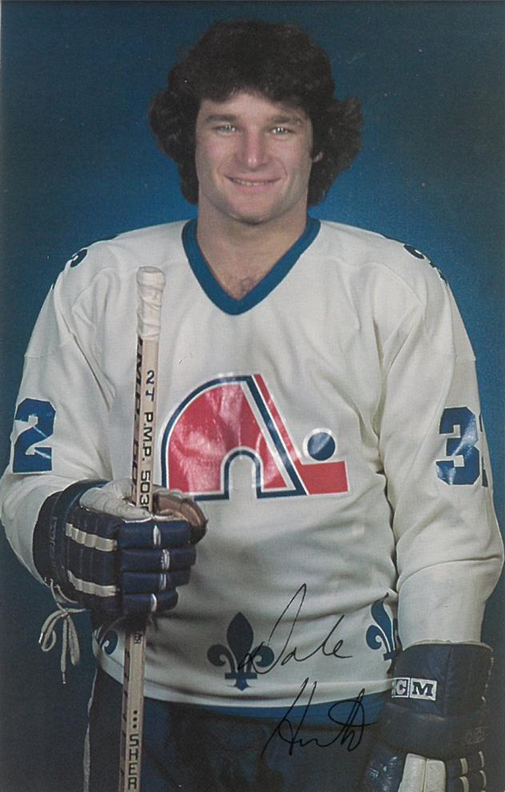
Hunter in his rookie season with the Quebec Nordiques in 1980

He was selected 41st overall by the Quebec Nordiques in the 1979 NHL entry draft. He would begin his NHL career a year later in 1980 and played seven years with the Nordiques.

According to his former Quebec Nordiques coach Michel Bergeron, even though Hunter was nicknamed the "Nuisance" on ice (La Petite Peste in French), he was known to be "humble" in the dressing room and a sort of "gentleman", close to all the players. He was the "perfect player", always the first to arrive at practice and ready to do all his best for the team. Thanks to his charisma, Hunter was a fan favourite in both Quebec and Washington. His leaving Quebec was seen as an obvious "mistake" linked to the team's future decline.

At the end of the 1986–87 season, Hunter was traded to the Washington Capitals along with Clint Malarchuk in return for Gaetan Duchesne, Alan Haworth, and a 1987 first-round draft pick the Nordiques then used to select future Hall of Famer Joe Sakic.

=== Washington Capitals ===
Hunter played for 12 seasons with the Washington Capitals, serving as team captain from 1994 to 1999.

In the 1988 Patrick Division Semifinals between the Capitals and Philadelphia Flyers, Hunter scored one of the biggest goals in Caps history. That goal was scored on a breakaway at 5:57 of overtime, beating Ron Hextall and gave Washington the 5–4 win in the deciding game 7.

During the 1991–92 Washington Capitals season, younger brother Mark briefly joined Hunter with the Capitals, playing seven games with the club.

In the 1993 Patrick Division Semifinals between the Capitals and New York Islanders, Hunter led his team with seven postseason goals. That performance was marred by an illegal and potentially career-ending check on Islanders' star Pierre Turgeon. This illegal check occurred after Turgeon had stolen an errant pass of Hunter's and subsequently scored. As Turgeon was celebrating, Hunter came up from behind and checked the unaware Turgeon into the boards, leading to a concussion and a separated right shoulder. As a result of the incident, Hunter was suspended for the first 21 games of the 1993–94 season as part of new commissioner Gary Bettman's effort to crack down on violent play.

He played in the 1997 NHL All-Star Game.

Hunter broke the 1,000 points barrier during the 1997–98 season, becoming the NHL record holder for requiring the most games to do so by a forward, at 1,308; the record stood until Patrick Marleau achieved the feat in his 1,349th game, during the 2015–16 season. Hunter holds the record for the player with the most penalty minutes to have scored 1,000 or more points.

In 1998, he led the fourth-seeded Capitals to their first appearance in the Stanley Cup Finals, defeating the Boston Bruins, Ottawa Senators, and Buffalo Sabres in the earlier rounds. In the finals, the Capitals were swept by the defending Cup champion Detroit Red Wings, with the first three games being decided by one goal.

In March 1999, at the trade deadline for the 1998–99 season, Hunter was traded back to his original franchise, albeit since relocated and renamed the Colorado Avalanche.

=== Colorado Avalanche ===
Hunter finished the 1998–99 season with the Colorado Avalanche, the successor to the Nordiques. He helped the team reach that season's Western Conference finals, losing in seven games to the eventual Stanley Cup champion Dallas Stars. On that team, he often played on the same line as two other renowned pest role players – Claude Lemieux and Theoren Fleury.

Hunter announced his retirement in July 1999, after 19 full seasons in the NHL.

== Post-NHL ==
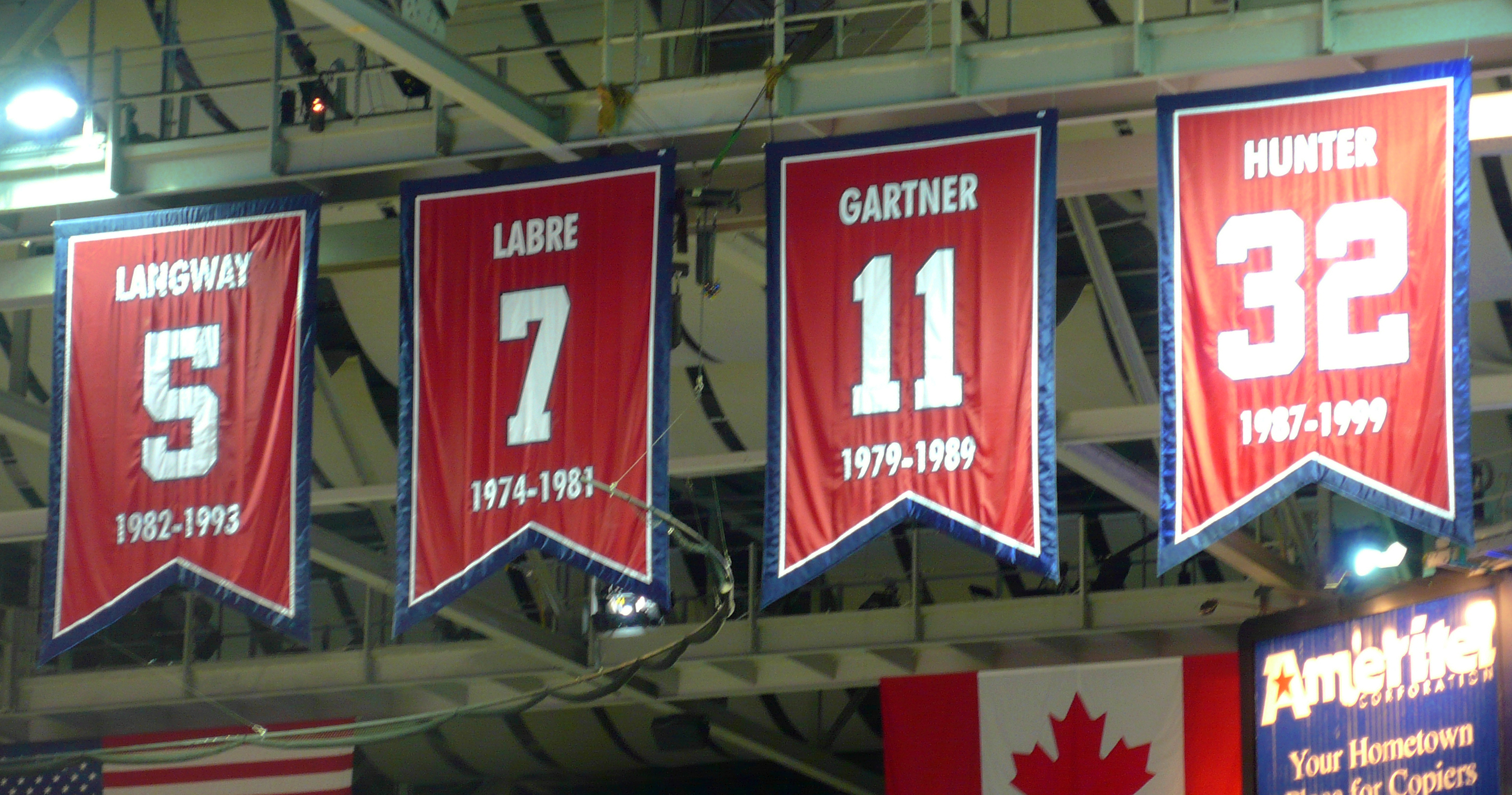
The Capitals retired Hunter's number in 2000, the third player to receive the honor in franchise history.

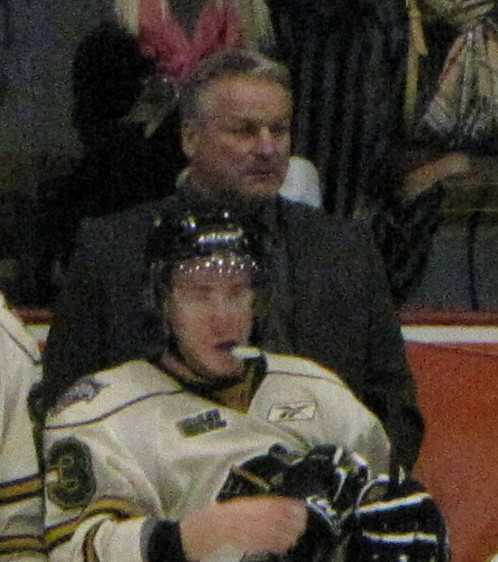
Hunter (top) with the London Knights in 2010

Hunter's sweater number (#32) was retired by the Capitals on March 11, 2000. During the ceremony, the Capitals presented Hunter with one of the penalty boxes from the Capital Centre (the Capitals' former home arena), symbolic of his exceptional amount of time served for penalties.

In 2000, Hunter and his brother, Mark—also a former NHL player—teamed up with Dale's former teammate on the Nordiques, Basil McRae, to buy the London Knights of the Ontario Hockey League. Dale became team president and head coach. He led the Knights to their first Memorial Cup championship in 2005. On January 1, 2006, the Hunter brothers were named to the 2006 Mayor's New Year's Honours List for Sports by the City of London, Ontario. Hunter's older brother Dave Hunter is also a former NHLer. His son Dylan Hunter is an assistant coach for the Knights and his other son Tucker also played for the London Knights before pursuing his education at the University of Western Ontario.

On November 28, 2011, Hunter resigned his position as head coach of the Knights to take the same position with the Washington Capitals, succeeding Bruce Boudreau. His brother Mark then took over as Knights coach. Hunter's defense oriented system caused some conflict with star Alexander Ovechkin but it helped the struggling Capitals make the playoffs, where they upset the defending Stanley Cup champions Boston Bruins in the first round before being eliminated by the New York Rangers, both postseason series going to seven games. On May 14, 2012, Hunter announced he was not returning to coach the Capitals in the 2012–2013 season, citing that he was "going home", referring to the Knights (which had his father work as a scout along with his children living nearby).

The Knights won their second Memorial Cup in 2016, which saw them win seventeen consecutive games before beating the Rouyn-Noranda Huskies in overtime to win the Cup.

On May 14, 2019, Hockey Canada named Hunter as the head coach for Canada's National Junior Team at the 2020 IIHF World Junior Championship. Hunter guided the team to the gold medal with a dramatic come-from-behind victory over Russia in the final game. The Knights won their third Memorial Cup in 2025.

== Accolades and controversy ==
Amassing a staggering 3,565 penalty minutes, Hunter currently has the second-most penalty minutes in NHL history, after Dave "Tiger" Williams (although Hunter played 1,407 games to Williams' 962). He also holds the NHL record for most penalty minutes in the playoffs, at 731. Hunter is the only NHL player ever to score over 1,000 points and rack up over 3,000 penalty minutes (1,020 points and 3,565 PIMs over 1,407 NHL games); of the nine players with 3,000+ penalty minutes, Hunter is the only one with a positive plus-minus, having recorded a +101 for his career. He recorded at least one penalty minute in 778 games during his career, the most for all players in NHL history. His 556 points for Washington still ranks among the top ten in franchise history. When he departed the Capitals, he held the franchise playoff record for goals (25), assists (47), points (72); each mark has since been passed, although he still holds the record for most playoff penalty minutes (372).

Hunter scored four game-winning goals in overtime of a playoff game, with two of them resulting in the end of a playoff series. He scored in overtime for Quebec in Game 5 of their 1982 opening round best-of-five series vs. the Montreal Canadiens and in 1988 he scored against Ron Hextall on a breakaway in overtime for Washington in the decisive Game 7 of their opening round series vs. the Philadelphia Flyers (Hunter, who tied the league record for most overtime goals to clinch a series for a career, was eclipsed by Martin Gelinas when he scored to win a third playoff series in overtime).

In early 2005, he received a momentary suspension from coaching due to making a mocking gesture at a referee. In September 2005, Hunter was suspended by the Ontario Hockey League for four games after a player left the bench to initiate a fight in an exhibition game.

On January 20, 2006, Hunter was suspended for two games and his team was fined $5,000 for Hunter's off ice abuse of the officials. In May 2006, Hunter was fined $5,000 by the OHL for criticizing officials after the Knights were eliminated from the playoffs in four straight games. In September 2006, Hunter was suspended by the OHL for two games after forward Matt Davis left the bench to engage in a fight during a game; OHL rules state that there is an automatic suspension for both the player and the coach if a player leaves the bench to become involved in an altercation.

In July 2006, Hunter was arrested and charged with DUI. The charges were dropped when the presiding judge ruled that his rights under the Canadian Charter of Rights and Freedoms were violated for unlawful detention and being denied his right to his lawyer.

In March 2007, he received a $5,000 fine and a five-game suspension for over incidents where his players abused on-ice officials and in light of his "position of authority and accountability."

=== Pierre Turgeon incident ===
Late in the deciding Game 6 of the 1993 Patrick Division Semifinals between the Capitals and New York Islanders, Pierre Turgeon stole the puck from Hunter and scored, putting the game out of reach. Hunter, who was trailing Turgeon on the play, checked Turgeon from behind well after the goal as he started to celebrate. Turgeon sustained a separated shoulder from the hit, causing him to miss all but Game 7 against the Pittsburgh Penguins in the second round, as well as most of the series against the Montreal Canadiens in the conference finals. New NHL Commissioner Gary Bettman, who had earlier promised to crack down on violence, suspended Hunter for the first 21 games of the 1993–94 season—at the time, the longest suspension in league history for an on-ice incident (in terms of games missed). Turgeon was surprised about the attack by Hunter, who called him three days later and apparently told Turgeon that he "didn't even see that I scored". According to longtime Islanders announcer Jiggs McDonald, he asked team coach Al Arbour a hypothetical question about who he would take if he could get a player from the Capitals to replace Turgeon, and Arbour stated Hunter, stating, “Because he wants to win, he’ll do anything to win.”

Turgeon did not hold a grudge against Hunter and even wished him well when Hunter was hired as head coach of the Washington Capitals in 2011.

== Career statistics ==
=== Playing career ===
Bold italics indicates NHL record

			Regular season					Playoffs
Season	Team	League	GP	G	A	Pts	PIM	GP	G	A	Pts	PIM
1977–78	Kitchener Rangers	OMJHL	68	22	42	64	115	9	1	0	1	32
1978–79	Sudbury Wolves	OMJHL	59	42	68	110	188	10	4	12	16	47
1979–80	Sudbury Wolves	OMJHL	61	34	51	85	189	9	6	9	15	45
1980–81	Quebec Nordiques	NHL	80	19	44	63	226	5	4	2	6	34
1981–82	Quebec Nordiques	NHL	80	22	50	72	272	16	3	7	10	52
1982–83	Quebec Nordiques	NHL	80	17	46	63	206	4	2	1	3	24
1983–84	Quebec Nordiques	NHL	77	24	55	79	232	9	2	3	5	41
1984–85	Quebec Nordiques	NHL	80	20	52	72	209	17	4	6	10	99
1985–86	Quebec Nordiques	NHL	80	28	42	70	265	3	0	0	0	15
1986–87	Quebec Nordiques	NHL	46	10	29	39	135	13	1	7	8	56
1987–88	Washington Capitals	NHL	79	22	37	59	240	14	7	5	12	98
1988–89	Washington Capitals	NHL	80	20	37	57	219	6	0	4	4	29
1989–90	Washington Capitals	NHL	80	23	39	62	233	15	4	8	12	61
1990–91	Washington Capitals	NHL	76	16	30	46	234	11	1	9	10	41
1991–92	Washington Capitals	NHL	80	28	50	78	205	7	1	4	5	16
1992–93	Washington Capitals	NHL	84	20	59	79	198	6	7	1	8	35
1993–94	Washington Capitals	NHL	52	9	29	38	131	7	0	3	3	14
1994–95	Washington Capitals	NHL	45	8	15	23	101	7	4	4	8	24
1995–96	Washington Capitals	NHL	82	13	24	37	112	6	1	5	6	24
1996–97	Washington Capitals	NHL	82	14	32	46	125	—	—	—	—	—
1997–98	Washington Capitals	NHL	82	8	18	26	103	21	0	4	4	30
1998–99	Washington Capitals	NHL	50	0	5	5	102	—	—	—	—	—
1998–99	Colorado Avalanche	NHL	12	2	4	6	17	19	1	3	4	38
NHL totals			1,407	323	697	1,020	3,565	186	42	76	118	731

=== Coaching career ===
==== NHL ====
Team	Year	Regular season						Postseason
Team	Year	G	W	L	OTL	Pts	Division rank	Result
Washington Capitals	2011-12	60	30	23	7	(92)	2nd in Southeast	Won in conference quarter-finals (4-3 vs. BOS); Lost in conference semi-finals (3-4 vs. NYR)
NHL totals		60	30	23	7	67		7-7 (0.500)

==== OHL ====
Team	Year	Regular season							Postseason
Team	Year	G	W	L	T	OTL	Pts	Finish	Result
London Knights	2001–02	50	19	19	6	6	50	5th in West	Won in conference quarter-finals (4-2 vs. PLY); Lost in conference semi-finals (2-4 vs. ERI)
London Knights	2002–03	68	31	27	7	3	72	2nd in Midwest	Won in conference quarter-finals (4-3 vs. WSR); Lost in conference semi-finals (3-4 vs. PLY)
London Knights	2003–04	68	53	11	2	2	110	1st in Midwest	Won in conference quarter-finals (4-0 vs. WSR); Won in conference semi-finals (4-0 vs. ERI); Lost in conference finals (3-4 vs. GUE)
London Knights	2004–05	68	59	7	2	0	120	1st in Midwest	Won in conference quarter-finals (4-0 vs. GUE); Won in conference semi-finals (4-0 vs. WSR); Won in conference finals (4-1 vs. KIT); Won J. Ross Robertson Cup (4-1 vs. OTT); Finished first in round-robin at Memorial Cup (3–0); Won Memorial Cup (4-0 vs. RIM)
London Knights	2005–06	68	49	15	-	4	102	1st in Midwest	Won in conference quarter-finals (4-0 vs. SSM); Won in conference semi-finals (4-2 vs. OS); Won in conference finals (4-1 vs. GUE); Lost in J. Ross Robertson Cup finals (0-4 vs. PBO)
London Knights	2006–07	68	50	14	-	4	104	1st in Midwest	Won in conference quarter-finals (4-0 vs. OS); Won in conference semi-finals (4-3 vs. SSM); Lost in conference finals (1-4 vs. PLY)
London Knights	2007–08	68	38	24	-	6	82	2nd in Midwest	Lost in conference quarter-finals (1-4 vs. GUE)
London Knights	2008–09	68	49	16	-	3	101	1st in Midwest	Won in conference quarter-finals (4-1 vs. ERI); Won in conference semi-finals (4-0 vs. SAG); Lost in conference finals (1-4 vs. WSR)
London Knights	2009–10	68	49	16	-	3	101	1st in Midwest	Won in conference quarter-finals (4-1 vs. GUE); Lost in conference semi-finals (3-4 vs. KIT)
London Knights	2010–11	68	34	29	-	5	73	5th in Midwest	Lost in conference quarter-finals (2-4 vs. OS)
London Knights	2011–12	26	20	5	-	1	(99)	1st in Midwest	(left to take Capitals coaching job)
London Knights	2012–13	68	50	13	-	5	105	1st in Midwest	Won in conference quarter-finals (4-0 vs. SAG); Won in conference semi-finals (4-1 vs. KIT); Won in conference finals (4-1 vs. PLY); Won J. Ross Robertson Cup (4-3 vs. BAR); Finished third in round-robin at Memorial Cup (1–2); Won Memorial Cup tie-breaker game (6-1 vs. SAS); Lost Memorial Cup semi-finals (1-2 vs. POR)
London Knights	2013–14	68	49	14	-	5	103	3rd in Midwest	Won in conference semi-finals (4-0 vs. WSR); Lost in conference semi-finals (1-4 vs. GUE); Finished fourth in round-robin at Memorial Cup (0–3)
London Knights	2014–15	68	40	24	-	4	84	3rd in Midwest	Won in conference quarter-finals (4-2 vs. KIT); Lost in conference semi-finals (0-4 vs. ERI)
London Knights	2015–16	68	51	14	-	3	105	2nd in Midwest	Won in conference quarter-finals (4-2 vs. OS); Won in conference semi-finals (4-0 vs. KIT); Won in conference finals (4-0 vs. ERI); Won J. Ross Robertson Cup (4-0 vs. NIA); Finished first in round-robin at Memorial Cup (3–0); Won Memorial Cup (3-2 vs. ROU)
London Knights	2016–17	68	46	15	-	7	99	3rd in Midwest	Won in conference quarter-finals (4-3 vs. WSR); Lost in conference semi-finals (3-4 vs. ERI)
London Knights	2017–18	68	39	25	-	4	82	3rd in Midwest	Lost in conference quarter-finals (0-4 vs. OS)
London Knights	2018–19	68	46	15	-	7	99	1st in Midwest	Won in conference quarter-finals (4-0 vs. WSR); Lost in conference semi-finals (3-4 vs. GUE)
London Knights	2019–20	62	45	15	-	2	92	1st in Midwest	Postseason cancelled due to COVID-19
London Knights	2021–22	68	39	22	-	7	85	1st in Midwest	Lost in conference quarter-finals (3-4 vs. KIT)
London Knights	2022–23	68	45	21	-	2	92	1st in Midwest	Won in conference quarter-finals (4-0 vs. OS); Won in conference semi-finals (4-1 vs. KIT); Won in conference finals (4-2 vs. SAR); Lost in J. Ross Robertson Cup finals (2-4 vs. PBO)
London Knights	2023–24	68	50	14	-	4	104	1st in Midwest	Won in conference quarter-finals (4-0 vs. FLI); Won in conference semi-finals (4-0 vs. KIT); Won in conference finals (4-2 vs. SAG); Won J. Ross Robertson Cup (4-0 vs. OSH); Finished 1st in round-robin at Memorial Cup (3–0); Lost Memorial Cup (3-4 vs. SAG)
London Knights	2024–25	68	55	11	-	2	112	1st in Midwest	Won in conference quarter-finals (4-0 vs. OS); Won in conference semi-finals (4-0 vs. ERI); Won in conference finals (4-0 vs. KIT); Won J. Ross Robertson Cup (4-1 vs. OSH); Finished 2nd in round-robin at Memorial Cup (2–1); Won Memorial Cup semi-finals (5-2 vs. MON); Won Memorial Cup (4-1 vs. MH)
London Knights	2025–26	68	40	23	-	5	85	2nd in Midwest	Lost in conference quarter-finals (1-4 vs. SSM)
Total		1566	1046	409	17	94	2203	14 Division Titles	5 J. Ross Robertson Cups (185–101, 0.647) 3 Memorial Cups (17–8, 0.680)

== See also ==
- List of NHL players with 1,000 points
- List of NHL players with 1,000 games played
- List of NHL players with 2,000 career penalty minutes

Sporting positions
Preceded by Kevin Hatcher	Washington Capitals captain 1994–99	Succeeded by Adam Oates
Preceded by Lindsay Hofford	Head coach of the London Knights; 2001–11	Succeeded by Mark Hunter
Preceded by Bruce Boudreau	Head coach of the Washington Capitals; 2011–12	Succeeded by Adam Oates
Preceded by Mark Hunter	Head coach of the London Knights; 2012–present	Succeeded by incumbent
