= List of NHL longest losing streaks =

This is a list of the longest losing streaks in National Hockey League (NHL) history. The list includes streaks that started at the end of one season and carried over into the following season. There are two lists, streaks that consist entirely of regular-season games and streaks made up of playoff games only. The 2003–04 Pittsburgh Penguins and 2020–21 Buffalo Sabres own the record for the longest losing streak in NHL history at 18 games. The 1974–75 Washington Capitals and 1992–93 San Jose Sharks own the NHL record for the longest pointless streak at 17 games; the 2003–04 Penguins' losing streak included one overtime loss, and the 2020–21 Sabres’ losing streak included two overtime and one shootout loss. Since the 1999–2000 season, the NHL awards a team one point for an overtime loss, and since the 2005–06 season, a team also receives one point for a shootout loss.

The 1980–81 Winnipeg Jets own the longest winless streak in NHL history at 30 games. Winnipeg's streak included 23 losses and seven ties.

The Chicago Blackhawks lost an NHL playoff record 16 straight games spanning five trips to the Stanley Cup playoffs between 1975 and 1979.

== Key ==
Italic score	Denotes streak ended with a tie
^	Denotes streaks that spanned at least two seasons
	Denotes streaks that are currently in progress

== Losing streaks ==
=== Regular season ===
This list contains only the top streaks consisting entirely of regular-season games, minimum 14 games.

Rank	Games	Team	Season(s)	Season record(s)	Date	Score	Opponent	Date	Score	Opponent	Notes
Rank	Games	Team	Season(s)	Season record(s)	Beginning (first defeat)			End (first victory or tie)			Notes
1 (tie)	18	Pittsburgh Penguins	2003–04	23–47–8–4	January 13, 2004	1–3	Tampa Bay Lightning	February 25, 2004	4–3 (OT)	Phoenix Coyotes	Longest losing streak in NHL history. During this losing streak, the Penguins recorded one point for the 2–3 overtime loss to the St. Louis Blues on February 14.
1 (tie)	18	Buffalo Sabres	2020–21	15–34–7 (Note: Season shortened by the COVID-19 pandemic.)	February 25, 2021	3–4 (OT)	New Jersey Devils	March 31, 2021	6–1	Philadelphia Flyers	Longest losing streak since shootouts were introduced in the 2005–06 season. During this losing streak, the Sabres recorded three points: one for the overtime loss to the Devils on February 25, two shootout losses against the Flyers, first for a 4–5 shootout loss on March 9, and then the 3–4 overtime loss on March 29.
3 (tie)	17	Washington Capitals	1974–75	8–67–5	February 18, 1975	1–6	Los Angeles Kings	March 28, 1975	5–3	California Golden Seals	Currently tied for the longest losing streak without a point in NHL history.
3 (tie)	17	San Jose Sharks	1992–93	11–71–2	January 4, 1993	1–4	Montreal Canadiens	February 14, 1993	3–2	Winnipeg Jets	Currently tied for the longest losing streak without a point in NHL history. Also part of a 20-game winless streak dating to December 29, 1992.
3 (tie)	17 (6 + 11)	San Jose Sharks	2022–23^ 2023–24^	22–44–16; 19–54–9	April 4, 2023	3–4 (OT)	Colorado Avalanche	November 7, 2023	2–1	Philadelphia Flyers	During this losing streak, the Sharks recorded two points: one for the 4–3 overtime loss to the Colorado Avalanche on April 4, and one for the 2–1 shootout loss to the Colorado Avalanche on October 14.
3 (tie)	17 (11 + 6)	San Jose Sharks	2024–25^ 2025–26^	20–50–12; 39–35–8	March 29, 2025	6–1	New York Rangers	October 23, 2025	6-5 (OT)	New York Rangers	During this losing streak, the Sharks recorded five points: one for the 3–4 shootout loss to the Anaheim Ducks on April 1, one for the 7–8 overtime loss to the Minnesota Wild on April 9, one for the 1–2 overtime loss to the Vancouver Canucks on April 14, one for the 4–3 overtime loss to the Vegas Golden Knights on October 9, and one for the 4–3 overtime loss to the Anaheim Ducks on October 11.
7	15	Philadelphia Quakers	1930–31	4–36–4	November 29, 1930	3–6	New York Rangers	January 10, 1931	4–3 (OT)	Montreal Maroons	
8 (tie)	14 (10 + 4)	Chicago Black Hawks	1927–28^ 1928–29^	7–34–3; 7–29–8	February 22, 1928	2–3	Ottawa Senators	November 25, 1928	1–1 (OT)	Boston Bruins	
8 (tie)	14	Kansas City Scouts	1975–76	12–56–12	December 30, 1975	2–5	Vancouver Canucks	January 31, 1976	4–4	Pittsburgh Penguins	
8 (tie)	14	Detroit Red Wings	1981–82	21–47–12	February 24, 1982	3–5	Los Angeles Kings	March 27, 1982	2–1	Toronto Maple Leafs	
8 (tie)	14	Quebec Nordiques	1990–91	16–50–14	October 21, 1990	2–3	Vancouver Canucks	November 21, 1990	4–4 (OT)	Hartford Whalers	
8 (tie)	14	Ottawa Senators	1992–93	10–70–4	March 2, 1993	2–3 (OT)	San Jose Sharks	April 10, 1993	5–3	New York Islanders	
8 (tie)	14	Carolina Hurricanes	2009–10	35–37–10	October 10, 2009	2–5	Tampa Bay Lightning	November 15, 2009	5–4 (SO)	Minnesota Wild	During this losing streak, the Hurricanes recorded four points: one for the 2–3 shootout loss to the Pittsburgh Penguins on October 14, one for the 3–4 shootout loss to the New York Islanders on October 21, one for the 2–3 overtime loss to the Wild on October 24, and one for the 3–4 overtime loss to the Islanders on November 13.
8 (tie)	14	New York Islanders	2010–11	30–39–13	October 23, 2010	3–4	Florida Panthers	November 26, 2010	2–0	New Jersey Devils	During this losing streak, the Islanders recorded three points: one for the 1–2 shootout loss to the San Jose Sharks on November 11, one for the 1–2 overtime loss to the Atlanta Thrashers on November 21, and one for the 3–4 overtime loss to the Columbus Blue Jackets on November 24.
8 (tie)	14 (6 + 8)	Columbus Blue Jackets	2010–11^ 2011–12^	34–35–13; 29–46–7	March 31, 2011	3–4 (OT)	Washington Capitals	October 25, 2011	4–1	Detroit Red Wings	During this losing streak, the Blue Jackets recorded three points: one for the overtime loss to the Capitals on March 31, one for the 3–4 shootout loss to the Chicago Blackhawks on April 1, and one for the 2–3 shootout loss to the Colorado Avalanche on October 12.
8 (tie)	14	Buffalo Sabres	2014–15	23–51–8	December 29, 2014	2–5	Ottawa Senators	February 3, 2015	3–2	Montreal Canadiens	During this losing streak, the Sabres did not record a point in the standings.
8 (tie)	14 (13 + 1)	Anaheim Ducks	2022–23^ 2023–24^	23–47–12; 27–50–5	March 19, 2023	2–1	Vancouver Canucks	October 15, 2023	3–6	Carolina Hurricanes	During this losing streak, the Ducks recorded two points: one for the 4–5 overtime loss to the Arizona Coyotes on April 8, and one for the 5–4 overtime loss to the Colorado Avalanche on April 9.
8 (tie)	14	Arizona Coyotes	2023–24	36–41–5	January 24, 2024	2–6	Florida Panthers	March 1, 2024	5–3	Ottawa Senators	During this losing streak, the Coyotes recorded two points: one for the 4–5 overtime loss to the Nashville Predators on February 10, and one for the 3–4 overtime loss to the Winnipeg Jets on February 25.

=== Postseason ===
This is a list of streaks recorded only in the playoffs. The list only features losing streaks stretched through multiple seasons, as the longest possible streak in a single playoff season is four games – eliminating the team from the playoffs.

Rank	Games	Team	Season started	Season ended	Number of years	Date	Score	Opponent	Date	Score	Opponent
Rank	Games	Team	Season started	Season ended	Number of years	Beginning (first defeat)			End (first victory)		
1	16	Chicago Black Hawks	1974–75	1979–80	5	April 20, 1975	2–6	Buffalo Sabres	April 8, 1980	3–2 (OT)	St. Louis Blues
2	14	Los Angeles Kings	1992–93	2000–01	8	June 3, 1993	2–3 (OT)	Montreal Canadiens	April 15, 2001	2–1	Detroit Red Wings
3	12	Toronto Maple Leafs	1978–79	1982–83	4	April 16, 1979	2–5	Montreal Canadiens	April 9, 1983	6–3	Minnesota North Stars
4	11	Chicago Black Hawks/Blackhawks	1984–85	1987–88	3	May 14, 1985	5–10	Edmonton Oilers	April 9, 1988	6–3	St. Louis Blues
5 (tie)	10	Chicago Black Hawks	1943–44	1952–53	9	April 4, 1944	1–5	Montreal Canadiens	March 29, 1953	2–1 (OT)	Montreal Canadiens
5 (tie)	10	Toronto Maple Leafs	1953–54	1955–56	2	March 27, 1954	1–3	Detroit Red Wings	March 27, 1956	2–0	Detroit Red Wings
5 (tie)	10	New York Rangers	1967–68	1969–70	2	April 11, 1968	4–7	Chicago Black Hawks	April 11, 1970	4–3	Boston Bruins
5 (tie)	10	Philadelphia Flyers	1967–68	1972–73	5	April 18, 1968	1–3	St. Louis Blues	April 5, 1973	4–1	Minnesota North Stars
5 (tie)	10	Chicago Blackhawks	1991–92	1993–94	2	May 26, 1992	4–5	Pittsburgh Penguins	April 23, 1994	5–4	Toronto Maple Leafs

== Winless streaks ==
This list includes teams who had the longest winless streaks in NHL history. The streaks include ties, and consists only of regular season games.

Rank	Games	Team	Season(s)	Season record(s)	Date	Score	Opponent	Date	Score	Opponent	Notes
Rank	Games	Team	Season(s)	Season record(s)	Beginning (first defeat or tie)			End (first victory)			Notes
1	30	Winnipeg Jets	1980–81	9–57–14	October 19, 1980	4–4	Quebec Nordiques	December 23, 1980	5–4	Colorado Rockies	Streak included 23 losses and seven ties.
2	27	Kansas City Scouts	1975–76	12–56–12	February 12, 1976	2–2	New York Islanders	October 5, 1976	4–2	Toronto Maple Leafs	Streak, included 21 losses and six ties, closed the season. Won in the first game of the next season, as the relocated Colorado Rockies.
3 (tie)	25	New York Rangers	1943–44^ 1944–45^	6–39–5; 11–29–10	January 23, 1944	0–15	Detroit Red Wings	November 11, 1944	5–2	Detroit Red Wings	Streak included 21 losses and four ties.
3 (tie)	25	Washington Capitals	1975–76	11–59–10	November 29, 1975	3–5	Minnesota North Stars	January 23, 1976	7–5	New York Rangers	Streak included 22 losses and three ties.
5	23	Detroit Red Wings	1976–77^ 1977–78^	16–55–9; 32–34–14	February 26, 1977	3–4	Los Angeles Kings	October 22, 1977	4–2	Minnesota North Stars	Streak included 20 losses and three ties.
6 (tie)	21	Chicago Black Hawks	1950–51	13–47–10	December 17, 1950	3–7	Montreal Canadiens	February 1, 1951	5–2	Boston Bruins	Streak included 18 losses and three ties.
6 (tie)	21	Ottawa Senators	1992–93	10–70–4	October 10, 1992	2–9	Quebec Nordiques	November 25, 1992	3–1	New Jersey Devils	Streak included 18 losses and three ties.
8 (tie)	20	Boston Bruins	1961–62	15–47–8	January 28, 1962	1–5	Montreal Canadiens	March 15, 1962	4–0	Detroit Red Wings	Streak included 16 losses and four ties.
8 (tie)	20	Minnesota North Stars	1969–70	19–35–22	January 15, 1970	1–1	Oakland Seals	March 1, 1970	8–0	Toronto Maple Leafs	Streak included 15 losses and five ties.
8 (tie)	20	Washington Capitals	1977–78	17–49–14	October 28, 1977	1–8	Colorado Rockies	December 7, 1977	5–3	Cleveland Barons	Streak included 15 losses and five ties.
8 (tie)	20	San Jose Sharks	1992–93	11–71–2	December 29, 1992	5–7	Vancouver Canucks	February 14, 1993	3–2	Winnipeg Jets	Streak included 19 losses and one tie.

== Pointless streaks ==
This list includes all teams with the longest losing streaks (14 or more games) without recording a point in NHL history. Starting with the 1999–2000 season, a team also receives a point for an overtime loss or (since 2005) shootout loss. Thus, the only way for modern NHL teams to achieve this dubious record is if all of their losses come in regulation.

Rank	Games	Team	Season(s)	Season record(s)	Date	Score	Opponent	Date	Score	Opponent
Rank	Games	Team	Season(s)	Season record(s)	Beginning (first defeat)			End (first victory or tie)		
1 (tie)	17	Washington Capitals	1974–75	8–67–5	February 18, 1975	1–6	Los Angeles Kings	March 28, 1975	5–3	California Golden Seals
1 (tie)	17	San Jose Sharks	1992–93	11–71–2	January 4, 1993	1–4	Montreal Canadiens	February 14, 1993	3–2	Winnipeg Jets
3	15	Philadelphia Quakers	1930–31	4–36–4	November 29, 1930	3–6	New York Rangers	January 10, 1931	4–3 (OT)	Montreal Maroons
4 (tie)	14 (10 + 4)	Chicago Black Hawks	1927–28^ 1928–29^	7–34–3; 7–29–8	February 22, 1928	2–3	Ottawa Senators	November 25, 1928	1–1 (OT)	Boston Bruins
4 (tie)	14	Kansas City Scouts	1975–76	12–56–12	December 30, 1975	2–5	Vancouver Canucks	January 31, 1976	4–4	Pittsburgh Penguins
4 (tie)	14	Detroit Red Wings	1981–82	21–47–12	February 24, 1982	3–5	Los Angeles Kings	March 27, 1982	2–1	Toronto Maple Leafs
4 (tie)	14	Quebec Nordiques	1990–91	16–50–14	October 21, 1990	2–3	Vancouver Canucks	November 21, 1990	4–4 (OT)	Hartford Whalers
4 (tie)	14	Ottawa Senators	1992–93	10–70–4	March 2, 1993	2–3 (OT)	San Jose Sharks	April 10, 1993	5–3	New York Islanders
4 (tie)	14	Buffalo Sabres	2014–15	23–51–8	December 29, 2014	2–5	Ottawa Senators	February 3, 2015	3–2	Montreal Canadiens

== See also ==
- List of NHL records (team)
- List of NHL longest winning streaks
