= 2020–21 Boston Bruins season =

Season of ice hockey team

2020–21 Boston Bruins
- Division: 3rd East
- 2020–21 record: 33–16–7
- Home record: 18–7–3
- Road record: 15–9–4
- Goals for: 168
- Goals against: 136

Team information
- General manager: Don Sweeney
- Coach: Bruce Cassidy
- Captain: Patrice Bergeron
- Alternate captains: David Krejci; Brad Marchand
- Arena: TD Garden
- Minor league affiliates: Providence Bruins (AHL); Atlanta Gladiators (ECHL)

Team leaders
- Goals: Brad Marchand (29)
- Assists: Brad Marchand (40)
- Points: Brad Marchand (69)
- Penalty minutes: Trent Frederic (65)
- Plus/minus: Patrice Bergeron (+27)
- Wins: Tuukka Rask (15)
- Goals against average: Jeremy Swayman (1.50)

The 2020–21 Boston Bruins season was the 97th season for the National Hockey League (NHL) franchise that was established on November 1, 1924. The Bruins entered the season as defending Presidents' Trophy and Atlantic Division champions. On December 20, 2020, the league temporarily realigned into four divisions with no conferences due to the COVID-19 pandemic and the ongoing closure of the Canada–United States border. As a result of this realignment, the Bruins played this season in the East Division, only facing opponents from within the new division in a shortened 56-game regular season, and the first two rounds of the playoffs.

On March 25, spectators were allowed back into the TD Garden with a limited capacity of 2,200. This was the first time fans were in attendance at a Bruins home game since March 7 of the previous year. The capacity at the Garden was increased to 25% on May 10. Starting May 29, the venue was able to host fans at full capacity.

On May 3, the Bruins clinched a playoff berth after a 3–0 win against the New Jersey Devils. In the playoffs, they eliminated the Washington Capitals in the first round in five games. The Bruins would lose to the New York Islanders in the second round in six games.

== Standings ==
=== Divisional standings ===
East Division
Pos	Team	GP	W	L	OTL	RW	GF	GA	GD	Pts
1	y – Pittsburgh Penguins	56	37	16	3	29	196	156	+40	77
2	x – Washington Capitals	56	36	15	5	29	191	163	+28	77
3	x – Boston Bruins	56	33	16	7	25	168	136	+32	73
4	x – New York Islanders	56	32	17	7	24	156	128	+28	71
5	New York Rangers	56	27	23	6	24	177	157	+20	60
6	Philadelphia Flyers	56	25	23	8	17	163	201	−38	58
7	New Jersey Devils	56	19	30	7	15	145	194	−49	45
8	Buffalo Sabres	56	15	34	7	11	138	199	−61	37

Source: National Hockey League
Rules for classification: 1) Fewer number of games played (GP, only during regular season); 2) Greater number of regulation wins (RW); 3) Greater number of wins in regulation and overtime, excluding shootout wins (ROW); 4) Greater number of total wins, including shootouts (W); 5) Greater number of points earned in head-to-head play; if teams played an uneven number of head-to-head games, the result of the first game on the home ice of the team with the extra home game is discarded; 6) Greater goal differential (GD); 7) Greater number of goals scored (GF)
x – Clinched playoff spot; y – Clinched division

== Schedule and results ==
=== Regular season ===
The regular season schedule was published on December 23, 2020.

2020–21 game log

January: 5–1–2 (Home: 4–0–0; Road: 1–1–2)
#	Date	Visitor	Score	Home	OT	Decision	Attendance	Record	Pts	Recap
1	January 14	Boston	3–2	New Jersey	SO	Rask	0	1–0–0	2
2	January 16	Boston	1–2	New Jersey	OT	Halak	0	1–0–1	3
3	January 18	Boston	0–1	NY Islanders		Rask	0	1–1–1	3
4	January 21	Philadelphia	4–5	Boston	SO	Rask	0	2–1–1	5
5	January 23	Philadelphia	1–6	Boston		Halak	0	3–1–1	7
6	January 26	Pittsburgh	2–3	Boston	OT	Rask	0	4–1–1	9
7	January 28	Pittsburgh	1–4	Boston		Halak	0	5–1–1	11
8	January 30	Boston	3–4	Washington	OT	Rask	0	5–1–2	12

February: 7–4–0 (Home: 1–1–0; Road: 6–3–0)
#	Date	Visitor	Score	Home	OT	Decision	Attendance	Record	Pts	Recap
9	February 1	Boston	5–3	Washington		Halak	0	6–1–2	14
10	February 3	Boston	4–3	Philadelphia	OT	Rask	0	7–1–2	16
11	February 5	Boston	2–1	Philadelphia		Rask	0	8–1–2	18
—	February 6	Buffalo	–	Boston	Postponed due to COVID-19. Rescheduled for March 27.
—	February 8	Buffalo	–	Boston	Postponed due to COVID-19. Rescheduled for April 13.
12	February 10	Boston	3–2	NY Rangers	OT	Rask	0	9–1–2	20
13	February 12	Boston	1–0	NY Rangers		Halak	0	10–1–2	22
14	February 13	Boston	2–4	NY Islanders		Rask	0	10–2–2	22
—	February 15	New Jersey	–	Boston	Postponed due to COVID-19. Rescheduled for March 7.
15	February 18	New Jersey	3–2	Boston		Halak	0	10–3–2	22
16	February 21	Philadelphia	3–7	Boston		Rask	0 (outdoors)	11–3–2	24
17	February 25	Boston	2–7	NY Islanders		Halak	0	11–4–2	24
18	February 26	Boston	2–6	NY Rangers		Rask	1,800	11–5–2	24
19	February 28	Boston	4–1	NY Rangers		Rask	1,800	12–5–2	26

March: 6–4–3 (Home: 4–3–2; Road: 2–1–1)
#	Date	Visitor	Score	Home	OT	Decision	Attendance	Record	Pts	Recap
20	March 3	Washington	2–1	Boston	SO	Rask	0	12–5–3	27
21	March 5	Washington	1–5	Boston		Halak	0	13–5–3	29
22	March 7	New Jersey	1–0	Boston		Rask	0	13–6–3	29
23	March 9	Boston	1–2	NY Islanders	SO	Halak	0	13–6–4	30
24	March 11	NY Rangers	0–4	Boston		Halak	0	14–6–4	32
25	March 13	NY Rangers	4–0	Boston		Halak	0	14–7–4	32
26	March 15	Boston	1–4	Pittsburgh		Halak	2,800	14–8–4	32
27	March 16	Boston	2–1	Pittsburgh		Vladar	2,800	15–8–4	34
28	March 18	Boston	4–1	Buffalo		Halak	0	16–8–4	36
—	March 20	Boston	–	Buffalo	Postponed due to COVID-19. Rescheduled for April 20.
—	March 23	NY Islanders	–	Boston	Postponed due to COVID-19. Rescheduled for May 10.
29	March 25	NY Islanders	4–3	Boston	OT	Halak	2,191	16–8–5	37
30	March 27	Buffalo	2–3	Boston		Vladar	2,191	17–8–5	39
31	March 28	New Jersey	1–0	Boston		Halak	2,191	17–9–5	39
32	March 30	New Jersey	4–5	Boston	SO	Halak	2,191	18–9–5	41

April: 11–5–1 (Home: 6–2–1; Road: 5–3–0)
#	Date	Visitor	Score	Home	OT	Decision	Attendance	Record	Pts	Recap
33	April 1	Pittsburgh	4–1	Boston		Vladar	2,191	18–10–5	41
34	April 3	Pittsburgh	5–7	Boston		Halak	2,191	19–10–5	43
35	April 5	Philadelphia	3–2	Boston	OT	Vladar	2,191	19–10–6	44
36	April 6	Boston	4–2	Philadelphia		Swayman	2,638	20–10–6	46
37	April 8	Boston	4–2	Washington		Swayman	0	21–10–6	48
38	April 10	Boston	2–3	Philadelphia		Swayman	3,025	21–11–6	48
39	April 11	Washington	8–1	Boston		Vladar	2,191	21–12–6	48
40	April 13	Buffalo	2–3	Boston	SO	Swayman	2,191	22–12–6	50
41	April 15	NY Islanders	1–4	Boston		Rask	2,191	23–12–6	52
42	April 16	NY Islanders	0–3	Boston		Swayman	2,191	24–12–6	54
43	April 18	Washington	3–6	Boston		Rask	2,191	25–12–6	56
44	April 20	Boston	2–0	Buffalo		Rask	0	26–12–6	58
45	April 22	Boston	5–1	Buffalo		Swayman	0	27–12–6	60
46	April 23	Boston	4–6	Buffalo		Halak	— (Note: Spectators were in attendance, but the exact number was not reported.)	27–13–6	60
47	April 25	Boston	0–1	Pittsburgh		Swayman	4,672	27–14–6	60
48	April 27	Boston	3–1	Pittsburgh		Rask	4,672	28–14–6	62
49	April 29	Buffalo	2–5	Boston		Rask	2,191	29–14–6	64

May: 4–2–1 (Home: 3–1–0; Road: 1–1–1)
#	Date	Visitor	Score	Home	OT	Decision	Attendance	Record	Pts	Recap
50	May 1	Buffalo	2–6	Boston		Swayman	2,191	30–14–6	66
51	May 3	Boston	3–0	New Jersey		Rask	3,600	31–14–6	68
52	May 4	Boston	3–4	New Jersey	OT	Halak	3,600	31–14–7	69
53	May 6	NY Rangers	0–4	Boston		Swayman	2,191	32–14–7	71
54	May 8	NY Rangers	5–4	Boston		Rask	2,191	32–15–7	71
55	May 10	NY Islanders	2–3	Boston	OT	Rask	4,565	33–15–7	73
56	May 11	Boston	1–2	Washington		Swayman	2,133	33–16–7	73

Legend: Win (2 points) Loss (0 points) Overtime/shootout loss (1 point) Postponement

=== Playoffs ===
2021 Stanley Cup playoffs

East Division First Round vs. (E2) Washington Capitals: Boston won 4–1
#	Date	Visitor	Score	Home	OT	Decision	Attendance	Series	Recap
1	May 15	Boston	2–3	Washington	OT	Rask	5,333	0–1
2	May 17	Boston	4–3	Washington	OT	Rask	5,333	1–1
3	May 19	Washington	2–3	Boston	2OT	Rask	4,565	2–1
4	May 21	Washington	1–4	Boston		Rask	4,565	3–1
5	May 23	Boston	3–1	Washington		Rask	5,333	4–1

East Division Second Round vs. (E4) New York Islanders: New York won 4–2
#	Date	Visitor	Score	Home	OT	Decision	Attendance	Series	Recap
1	May 29	NY Islanders	2–5	Boston		Rask	17,400	1–0
2	May 31	NY Islanders	4–3	Boston	OT	Rask	17,400	1–1
3	June 3	Boston	2–1	NY Islanders	OT	Rask	12,000	2–1
4	June 5	Boston	1–4	NY Islanders		Rask	12,000	2–2
5	June 7	NY Islanders	5–4	Boston		Swayman	17,400	2–3
6	June 9	Boston	2–6	NY Islanders		Rask	12,000	2–4

Legend: Win Loss

== Draft picks ==
Below are the Boston Bruins' selections at the 2020 NHL entry draft, which was originally scheduled for June 26–27, 2020 at the Bell Center in Montreal, Quebec, but was postponed on March 25, 2020, due to the COVID-19 pandemic. The rescheduled draft was held October 6–7, 2020 virtually via Video conference call from the NHL Network studio in Secaucus, New Jersey.

Round	#	Player	Pos	Nationality	College/Junior/Club team (League)
2	58	Mason Lohrei	D	United States	Green Bay Gamblers (USHL)
3	89	Trevor Kuntar	C	United States	Boston College (H-East)
5	151	Mason Langenbrunner	D	United States	Eden Prairie (USHS-MN)
6	182	Riley Duran	C	United States	Lawrence Academy (USHS-MA)
