= 2020–21 Pittsburgh Penguins season =

NHL team season

2020–21 Pittsburgh Penguins
- East Division champions
- Division: 1st East
- 2020–21 record: 37–16–3
- Home record: 22–4–2
- Road record: 15–12–1
- Goals for: 196
- Goals against: 156

Team information
- General manager: Jim Rutherford (Jan. 13 – Jan. 27); Patrik Allvin (interim, Jan. 27 – Feb. 9); Ron Hextall (Feb. 9 – May 26)
- Coach: Mike Sullivan
- Captain: Sidney Crosby
- Alternate captains: Kris Letang; Evgeni Malkin
- Arena: PPG Paints Arena
- Minor league affiliates: Wilkes-Barre/Scranton Penguins (AHL); Wheeling Nailers (ECHL)

Team leaders
- Goals: Sidney Crosby (24)
- Assists: Sidney Crosby; Kris Letang (38)
- Points: Sidney Crosby (62)
- Penalty minutes: Kris Letang (32)
- Plus/minus: Kris Letang (+19)
- Wins: Tristan Jarry (25)
- Goals against average: Casey DeSmith (2.54)

The 2020–21 Pittsburgh Penguins season was the 54th season for the National Hockey League team that was established on June 5, 1967. On December 20, 2020, the league temporarily realigned into four divisions with no conferences due to the COVID-19 pandemic and the ongoing closure of the Canada–United States border. As a result of this realignment, the Penguins would play this season in the East Division and would only play against the other teams in their new division during the regular season and potentially the first two rounds of the playoffs.

On April 29, 2021, the Penguins clinched a playoff berth with a 5–4 overtime win over the Washington Capitals, extending their playoff streak to 15 seasons – the longest active streak among the four North American major leagues, after the San Antonio Spurs of National Basketball Association missed the playoffs for the first time in 22 years. (including MLB, the NFL, and the NBA). On May 8, the team clinched the East Division title after defeating the Buffalo Sabres 1-0, for their first division championship since the 2013–14 season. The Penguins were then defeated in the First Round in six games by the New York Islanders. On April 20, 2021, the Penguins barreled through the first two periods en route to a 6-0 lead at the end of the second period. The Devils outscored them 6-1 in the third period, but the Penguins still won, 7-6. The Penguins became the first team in NHL history to be outscored by 5 goals in the third period of a game but still be on the winning end.

== Standings ==
=== Divisional standings ===
East Division
Pos	Team	GP	W	L	OTL	RW	GF	GA	GD	Pts
1	y – Pittsburgh Penguins	56	37	16	3	29	196	156	+40	77
2	x – Washington Capitals	56	36	15	5	29	191	163	+28	77
3	x – Boston Bruins	56	33	16	7	25	168	136	+32	73
4	x – New York Islanders	56	32	17	7	24	156	128	+28	71
5	New York Rangers	56	27	23	6	24	177	157	+20	60
6	Philadelphia Flyers	56	25	23	8	17	163	201	−38	58
7	New Jersey Devils	56	19	30	7	15	145	194	−49	45
8	Buffalo Sabres	56	15	34	7	11	138	199	−61	37

Source: National Hockey League
Rules for classification: 1) Fewer number of games played (GP, only during regular season); 2) Greater number of regulation wins (RW); 3) Greater number of wins in regulation and overtime, excluding shootout wins (ROW); 4) Greater number of total wins, including shootouts (W); 5) Greater number of points earned in head-to-head play; if teams played an uneven number of head-to-head games, the result of the first game on the home ice of the team with the extra home game is discarded; 6) Greater goal differential (GD); 7) Greater number of goals scored (GF)
x – Clinched playoff spot; y – Clinched division

== Schedule and results ==
=== Regular season ===
The regular season schedule was published on December 23, 2020.

2020–21 game log
January: 5–3–1 (Home: 4–0–0; Road: 1–3–1)

#	Date	Visitor	Score	Home	Decision	Attendance	Record	Points
1	January 13	Pittsburgh	3–6	Philadelphia	Jarry	0	0–1–0	0
2	January 15	Pittsburgh	2–5	Philadelphia	Jarry	0	0–2–0	0
3	January 17	Washington	3–4 SO	Pittsburgh	DeSmith	0	1–2–0	2
4	January 19	Washington	4–5 OT	Pittsburgh	DeSmith	0	2–2–0	4
5	January 22	NY Rangers	3–4 SO	Pittsburgh	Jarry	0	3–2–0	6
6	January 24	NY Rangers	2–3	Pittsburgh	Jarry	0	4–2–0	8
7	January 26	Pittsburgh	2–3 OT	Boston	Jarry	0	4–2–1	9
8	January 28	Pittsburgh	1–4	Boston	Jarry	0	4–3–1	9
9	January 30	Pittsburgh	5–4 OT	NY Rangers	DeSmith	0	5–3–1	11

February: 6–5–0 (Home: 3–1–0; Road: 3–4–0)

#	Date	Visitor	Score	Home	Decision	Attendance	Record	Points
10	February 1	Pittsburgh	1–3	NY Rangers	DeSmith	0	5–4–1	11
—	February 2	New Jersey	–	Pittsburgh	Postponed due to COVID-19. Rescheduled for March 21.			
—	February 4	New Jersey	–	Pittsburgh	Postponed due to COVID-19. Rescheduled for April 20.			
11	February 6	Pittsburgh	3–4	NY Islanders	Jarry	0	5–5–1	11
12	February 11	Pittsburgh	4–3 SO	NY Islanders	DeSmith	0	6–5–1	13
13	February 14	Washington	3–6	Pittsburgh	Jarry	0	7–5–1	15
14	February 16	Washington	3–1	Pittsburgh	Jarry	0	7–6–1	15
15	February 18	NY Islanders	1–4	Pittsburgh	Jarry	0	8–6–1	17
16	February 20	NY Islanders	2–3	Pittsburgh	Jarry	0	9–6–1	19
17	February 23	Pittsburgh	3–2 OT	Washington	Jarry	0	10–6–1	21
18	February 25	Pittsburgh	2–5	Washington	Jarry	0	10–7–1	21
19	February 27	Pittsburgh	4–3 OT	NY Islanders	Jarry	0	11–7–1	23
20	February 28	Pittsburgh	0–2	NY Islanders	DeSmith	0	11–8–1	23

March: 12–3–1 (Home: 9–2–1; Road: 3–1–0)

#	Date	Visitor	Score	Home	Decision	Attendance	Record	Points
21	March 2	Philadelphia	2–5	Pittsburgh	Jarry	2,800	12–8–1	25
22	March 4	Philadelphia	4–3	Pittsburgh	Jarry	2,800	12–9–1	25
23	March 6	Philadelphia	3–4	Pittsburgh	Jarry	2,800	13–9–1	27
24	March 7	NY Rangers	1–5	Pittsburgh	DeSmith	2,800	14–9–1	29
25	March 9	NY Rangers	2–4	Pittsburgh	Jarry	2,800	15–9–1	31
26	March 11	Pittsburgh	5–2	Buffalo	Jarry	0	16–9–1	33
27	March 13	Pittsburgh	3–0	Buffalo	DeSmith	0	17–9–1	35
28	March 15	Boston	1–4	Pittsburgh	Jarry	2,800	18–9–1	37
29	March 16	Boston	2–1	Pittsburgh	DeSmith	2,800	18–10–1	37
30	March 18	Pittsburgh	2–3	New Jersey	Jarry	1,800	18–11–1	37
31	March 20	Pittsburgh	3–1	New Jersey	DeSmith	1,800	19–11–1	39
32	March 21	New Jersey	2–1 OT	Pittsburgh	Jarry	2,800	19–11–2	40
33	March 24	Buffalo	2–5	Pittsburgh	Jarry	2,800	20–11–2	42
34	March 25	Buffalo	0–4	Pittsburgh	DeSmith	2,800	21–11–2	44
35	March 27	NY Islanders	3–6	Pittsburgh	Jarry	2,800	22–11–2	46
36	March 29	NY Islanders	1–2	Pittsburgh	Jarry	2,800	23–11–2	48

April: 10–4–1 (Home: 5–1–1; Road: 5–3–0)

#	Date	Visitor	Score	Home	Decision	Attendance	Record	Points
37	April 1	Pittsburgh	4–1	Boston	DeSmith	2,191	24–11–2	50
38	April 3	Pittsburgh	5–7	Boston	DeSmith	2,191	24–12–2	50
39	April 6	Pittsburgh	4–8	NY Rangers	DeSmith	1,693	24–13–2	50
40	April 8	Pittsburgh	5–2	NY Rangers	Jarry	1,800	25–13–2	52
41	April 9	Pittsburgh	6–4	New Jersey	DeSmith	3,600	26–13–2	54
42	April 11	Pittsburgh	5–2	New Jersey	Jarry	3,600	27–13–2	56
43	April 15	Philadelphia	2–1 SO	Pittsburgh	Jarry	4,672	27–13–3	57
44	April 17	Pittsburgh	3–2	Buffalo	Jarry	— (Note: Spectators were in attendance, but the exact number was not reported.)	28–13–3	59
45	April 18	Pittsburgh	2–4	Buffalo	DeSmith	0	28–14–3	59
46	April 20	New Jersey	6–7	Pittsburgh	Jarry	4,672	29–14–3	61
47	April 22	New Jersey	1–5	Pittsburgh	Jarry	4,672	30–14–3	63
48	April 24	New Jersey	2–4	Pittsburgh	DeSmith	4,672	31–14–3	65
49	April 25	Boston	0–1	Pittsburgh	Jarry	4,672	32–14–3	67
50	April 27	Boston	3–1	Pittsburgh	Jarry	4,672	32–15–3	67
51	April 29	Pittsburgh	5–4 OT	Washington	Jarry	2,133	33–15–3	69

May: 4–1–0 (Home: 2–0–0; Road: 2–1–0)

#	Date	Visitor	Score	Home	Decision	Attendance	Record	Points
52	May 1	Pittsburgh	3–0	Washington	Jarry	2,133	34–15–3	71
53	May 3	Pittsburgh	2–7	Philadelphia	DeSmith	2,542	34–16–3	71
54	May 4	Pittsburgh	7–3	Philadelphia	Jarry	2,961	35–16–3	73
55	May 6	Buffalo	4–8	Pittsburgh	Jarry	4,672	36–16–3	75
56	May 8	Buffalo	0–1	Pittsburgh	Lagace	4,672	37–16–3	77

Legend: = Win = Loss = OT/SO Loss = Postponement

=== Playoffs ===
2021 Stanley Cup playoffs
East Division First Round vs. (E4) New York Islanders: New York won 4–2

#	Date	Visitor	Score	Home	OT	Decision	Attendance	Series	Recap
1	May 16	NY Islanders	4–3	Pittsburgh	OT	Jarry	4,672	0–1	Recap
2	May 18	NY Islanders	1–2	Pittsburgh		Jarry	9,344	1–1	Recap
3	May 20	Pittsburgh	5–4	NY Islanders		Jarry	6,800	2–1	Recap
4	May 22	Pittsburgh	1–4	NY Islanders		Jarry	6,800	2–2	Recap
5	May 24	NY Islanders	3–2	Pittsburgh	2OT	Jarry	9,344	2–3	Recap
6	May 26	Pittsburgh	3–5	NY Islanders		Jarry	9,000	2–4	Recap

Legend: = Win = Loss

== Player statistics ==
Skaters

Regular season
Player	GP	G	A	Pts	+/−	PIM
Sidney Crosby	55	24	38	62	8	26
Jake Guentzel	56	23	34	57	7	28
Kris Letang	55	7	38	45	19	32
Bryan Rust	56	22	20	42	9	18
Jared McCann	43	14	18	32	17	8
Kasperi Kapanen	40	11	19	30	15	7
Evgeni Malkin	33	8	20	28	-4	24
Teddy Blueger	43	7	15	22	10	16
Jason Zucker	38	9	9	18	-8	21
Cody Ceci	53	4	13	17	18	10
Brandon Tanev	32	7	9	16	12	22
Mike Matheson	44	5	11	16	9	28
Zach Aston-Reese	45	9	6	15	10	15
Evan Rodrigues	35	7	7	14	-3	6
Brian Dumoulin	41	4	10	14	18	12
John Marino	52	3	10	13	5	8
Jeff Carter^{†}	14	9	2	11	9	0
Mark Jankowski	45	4	7	11	4	6
Colton Sceviour	46	5	5	10	0	2
Frederick Gaudreau	19	2	8	10	10	2
Marcus Pettersson	47	2	7	9	8	22
Sam Lafferty	34	0	6	6	-6	25
Pierre-Olivier Joseph	16	1	4	5	1	6
Anthony Angello	19	2	2	4	4	8
Radim Zohorna	8	2	2	4	4	4
Mark Friedman^{†}	5	2	1	3	3	5
Chad Ruhwedel	17	0	2	2	3	14
Drew O'Connor	10	0	1	1	-2	2
Yannick Weber	2	0	0	0	-3	0
Josh Currie	1	0	0	0	0	0
Kevin Czuczman	2	0	0	0	-3	0
Juuso Riikola	2	0	0	0	0	0
Total		193	324	517	—	377

Playoffs
Player	GP	G	A	Pts	+/−	PIM
Kris Letang	6	1	5	6	-2	6
Jeff Carter	6	4	1	5	0	4
Evgeni Malkin	4	1	4	5	-2	8
Jason Zucker	6	2	1	3	-1	2
Bryan Rust	6	2	1	3	-3	4
Frederick Gaudreau	6	1	2	3	3	2
Kasperi Kapanen	6	1	2	3	-3	0
Sidney Crosby	6	1	1	2	-2	2
Jake Guentzel	6	1	1	2	-6	6
Zach Aston-Reese	6	1	1	2	0	2
Brian Dumoulin	6	0	2	2	-1	2
Cody Ceci	6	0	2	2	-3	0
Brandon Tanev	6	1	0	1	-2	0
Jared McCann	6	0	1	1	1	2
Marcus Pettersson	6	0	1	1	-1	0
Evan Rodrigues	2	0	1	1	1	0
Mike Matheson	6	0	0	0	-2	0
Teddy Blueger	6	0	0	0	-2	2
John Marino	6	0	0	0	-1	6
Total		16	26	42	—	48

Goaltenders

Regular season
Player	GP	GS	TOI	W	L	OT	GA	GAA	SA	SV%	SO	G	A	PIM
Tristan Jarry	39	38	2185:18	25	9	3	100	2.75	1100	0.909	2	0	4	8
Casey DeSmith	20	17	1132:19	11	7	0	48	2.54	543	0.912	2	0	1	0
Maxime Lagace	1	1	60:00	1	0	0	0	0	29	1.000	1	0	0	0
Total		56	3377:37	37	16	3	148	2.63	1672	0.911	5	0	5	8

Playoffs
Player	GP	GS	TOI	W	L	OT	GA	GAA	SA	SV%	SO	G	A	PIM
Tristan Jarry	6	6	396:07	2	4	0	21	3.18	187	0.888	0	0	0	0
Total		6	396:07	2	4	0	21	3.18	187	0.888	0	0	0	0

^{†}Denotes player spent time with another team before joining the Penguins. Stats reflect time with the Penguins only.
^{‡}Denotes player was traded mid-season. Stats reflect time with the Penguins only.

== Awards and records ==
- Sidney Crosby became the first person to play 1,000 games for the Pittsburgh Penguins. He set the mark in a game against the New York Islanders on February 20.

== Transactions ==
The Penguins have been involved in the following transactions during the 2020–21 season.

=== Trades ===
Date	Details	
October 7, 2020	To Ottawa Senators Matt Murray	To Pittsburgh Penguins Jonathan Gruden; 2nd-round pick in 2020
April 12, 2021	To Los Angeles Conditional 3rd-round pick in 2022; Conditional 4th-round pick in 2023	To Pittsburgh Penguins Jeff Carter

== Draft picks ==
Below are the Pittsburgh Penguins' selections at the 2020 NHL entry draft, which was originally scheduled for June 26–27, 2020 at the Bell Center in Montreal, Quebec, but was postponed on March 25, 2020, due to the COVID-19 pandemic. It was instead held on October 6–7, 2020, virtually via video conference call from the NHL Network studio in Secaucus, New Jersey.

Round	#	Player	Pos	Nationality	College/Junior/Club team (League)
2	52	Joel Blomqvist	G	Finland	Oulun Kärpät U20 (Jr. A SM-liiga)
3	77	Calle Clang	G	Sweden	Kristianstads IK (HockeyAllsvenskan)
4	108	Lukas Svejkovsky	C	United States	Medicine Hat Tigers (WHL)
6	170	Chase Yoder	C	United States	U.S. NTDP (USHL)
