= 2020–21 Washington Capitals season =

NHL ice hockey team season

2020–21 Washington Capitals
- Division: 2nd East
- 2020–21 record: 36–15–5
- Home record: 17–8–3
- Road record: 19–7–2
- Goals for: 191
- Goals against: 163

Team information
- General manager: Brian MacLellan
- Coach: Peter Laviolette
- Captain: Alexander Ovechkin
- Alternate captains: Nicklas Backstrom; John Carlson
- Arena: Capital One Arena
- Minor league affiliates: Hershey Bears (AHL); South Carolina Stingrays (ECHL)

Team leaders
- Goals: Alexander Ovechkin (24)
- Assists: Nicklas Backstrom (38)
- Points: Nicklas Backstrom (53)
- Penalty minutes: Tom Wilson (96)
- Plus/minus: Dmitry Orlov (+16)
- Wins: Vitek Vanecek (21)
- Goals against average: Craig Anderson (2.13)

The 2020–21 Washington Capitals season was the 47th season for the National Hockey League (NHL) franchise that was established on June 11, 1974. This was the first season for Peter Laviolette as head coach of the Capitals after their former head coach Todd Reirden was fired from the team on August 23, 2020. On December 20, 2020, the league temporarily realigned into four divisions with no conferences due to the COVID-19 pandemic and the ongoing closure of the Canada–United States border. As a result of this realignment, the Capitals would play this season in the East Division and would play against only the other teams in their new division during the regular season and potentially the first two rounds of the playoffs.

On April 29, the Capitals clinched a playoff berth after a 5–4 overtime loss to the Pittsburgh Penguins. As a result of the Capitals winning in overtime against the Philadelphia Flyers while the Penguins won in regulation against the Buffalo Sabres on May 8, the Penguins won the East division title, and the Capitals failed to win the division for the first time since the 2014–15 season. They were eliminated from the playoffs in the First Round with a 3–1 loss to the Boston Bruins in game five on May 23.

== Standings ==
=== Divisional standings ===
East Division
Pos	Team	GP	W	L	OTL	RW	GF	GA	GD	Pts
1	y – Pittsburgh Penguins	56	37	16	3	29	196	156	+40	77
2	x – Washington Capitals	56	36	15	5	29	191	163	+28	77
3	x – Boston Bruins	56	33	16	7	25	168	136	+32	73
4	x – New York Islanders	56	32	17	7	24	156	128	+28	71
5	New York Rangers	56	27	23	6	24	177	157	+20	60
6	Philadelphia Flyers	56	25	23	8	17	163	201	−38	58
7	New Jersey Devils	56	19	30	7	15	145	194	−49	45
8	Buffalo Sabres	56	15	34	7	11	138	199	−61	37

Source: National Hockey League
Rules for classification: 1) Fewer number of games played (GP, only during regular season); 2) Greater number of regulation wins (RW); 3) Greater number of wins in regulation and overtime, excluding shootout wins (ROW); 4) Greater number of total wins, including shootouts (W); 5) Greater number of points earned in head-to-head play; if teams played an uneven number of head-to-head games, the result of the first game on the home ice of the team with the extra home game is discarded; 6) Greater goal differential (GD); 7) Greater number of goals scored (GF)
x – Clinched playoff spot; y – Clinched division

== Schedule and results ==
=== Regular season ===
The regular season schedule was published on December 23, 2020.

2020–21 game log
January: 6–0–3 (Home: 4–0–1; Road: 2–0–2)

Game	Date	Opponent	Score	OT	Decision	Attendance	Record	Points	Recap
1	January 14	@ Buffalo	6–4		Samsonov	0	1–0–0	2	
2	January 15	@ Buffalo	2–1		Vanecek	0	2–0–0	4	
3	January 17	@ Pittsburgh	3–4	SO	Samsonov	0	2–0–1	5	
4	January 19	@ Pittsburgh	4–5	OT	Vanecek	0	2–0–2	6	
5	January 22	Buffalo	4–3	SO	Vanecek	0	3–0–2	8	
6	January 24	Buffalo	3–4	SO	Vanecek	0	3–0–3	9	
7	January 26	NY Islanders	3–2		Vanecek	0	4–0–3	11	
8	January 28	NY Islanders	6–3		Vanecek	0	5–0–3	13	
9	January 30	Boston	4–3	OT	Vanecek	0	6–0–3	15	

February: 6–5–1 (Home: 3–3–1; Road: 3–2–0)

Game	Date	Opponent	Score	OT	Decision	Attendance	Record	Points	Recap
10	February 1	Boston	3–5		Vanecek	0	6–1–3	15	
11	February 4	@ NY Rangers	2–4		Vanecek	0	6–2–3	15	
12	February 7	Philadelphia	4–7		Anderson	0	6–3–3	15	
–	February 9	Philadelphia	–	Postponed due to COVID-19. Rescheduled for April 13.					
–	February 11	@ Buffalo	–	Postponed due to COVID-19. Rescheduled for March 15.					
–	February 13	@ Buffalo	–	Postponed due to COVID-19. Rescheduled for April 9.					
13	February 14	@ Pittsburgh	3–6		Vanecek	0	6–4–3	15	
14	February 16	@ Pittsburgh	3–1		Vanecek	0	7–4–3	17	
15 (Note: The following games have been rescheduled: Buffalo at Washington originally scheduled for April 13, is now scheduled for February 18.; Washington at New Jersey originally scheduled for March 1, is now scheduled for February 28.)	February 18	Buffalo	3–1		Vanecek	0	8–4–3	19	
16	February 20	NY Rangers	1–4		Vanecek	0	8–5–3	19	
17 (Note: The following games have been rescheduled: New Jersey at Washington originally scheduled for March 7, is now scheduled for February 21.; Washington at Philadelphia originally scheduled for April 27, is now scheduled for March 7.; NY Rangers at Washington originally scheduled for February 21, is now scheduled for March 20.; NY Islanders at Washington originally scheduled for March 15, is now scheduled for April 27.)	February 21	New Jersey	4–3		Anderson	0	9–5–3	21	
18	February 23	Pittsburgh	2–3	OT	Vanecek	0	9–5–4	22	
19	February 25	Pittsburgh	5–2		Vanecek	0	10–5–4	24	
20	February 27	@ New Jersey	5–2		Vanecek	0	11–5–4	26	
21	February 28	@ New Jersey	3–2		Samsonov	0	12–5–4	28	

March: 11–3–0 (Home: 6–1–0; Road: 5–2–0)

Game	Date	Opponent	Score	OT	Decision	Attendance	Record	Points	Recap
22	March 3	@ Boston	2–1	SO	Vanecek	0	13–5–4	30	
23	March 5	@ Boston	1–5		Vanecek	0	13–6–4	30	
24	March 7	@ Philadelphia	3–1		Samsonov	3,023	14–6–4	32	
25	March 9	New Jersey	5–4	OT	Vanecek	0	15–6–4	34	
26	March 11	@ Philadelphia	5–3		Samsonov	2,807	16–6–4	36	
27	March 13	@ Philadelphia	5–4		Samsonov	3,083	17–6–4	38	
28	March 15	@ Buffalo	6–0		Vanecek	0	18–6–4	40	
29	March 16	NY Islanders	3–1		Samsonov	0	19–6–4	42	
30	March 19	NY Rangers	2–1		Vanecek	0	20–6–4	44	
31	March 20	NY Rangers	1–3		Samsonov	0	20–7–4	44	
32	March 25	New Jersey	4–3		Vanecek	0	21–7–4	46	
33	March 26	New Jersey	4–0		Samsonov	0	22–7–4	48	
34	March 28	NY Rangers	5–4		Samsonov	0	23–7–4	50	
35	March 30	@ NY Rangers	2–5		Vanecek	1,761	23–8–4	50	

April: 9–5–1 (Home: 2–2–1; Road: 7–3–0)

Game	Date	Opponent	Score	OT	Decision	Attendance	Record	Points	Recap
36	April 1	@ NY Islanders	4–8		Samsonov	1,400	23–9–4	50	
37	April 2	@ New Jersey	2–1	OT	Vanecek	3,600	24–9–4	52	
38	April 4	@ New Jersey	5–4		Samsonov	3,600	25–9–4	54	
39	April 6	@ NY Islanders	0–1		Vanecek	1,400	25–10–4	54	
40	April 8	Boston	2–4		Samsonov	0	25–11–4	54	
41	April 9	@ Buffalo	4–3		Vanecek	— (Note: Spectators were in attendance, but the exact number was not reported.)	26–11–4	56	
42 (Note: The following games have been rescheduled: Washington at Boston originally scheduled for April 20, is now scheduled for April 11.; Boston at Washington originally scheduled for April 10, was moved to April 11, is now scheduled for May 11.)	April 11	@ Boston	8–1		Vanecek	2,191	27–11–4	58	
43	April 13	Philadelphia	6–1		Samsonov	0	28–11–4	60	
44	April 15	Buffalo	2–5		Vanecek	0	28–12–4	60	
45	April 17	@ Philadelphia	6–3		Samsonov	3,430	29–12–4	62	
46	April 18	@ Boston	3–6		Vanecek	2,191	29–13–4	62	
47	April 22	@ NY Islanders	1–0	SO	Samsonov	1,400	30–13–4	64	
48	April 24	@ NY Islanders	6–3		Samsonov	1,400	31–13–4	66	
49	April 27	NY Islanders	1–0		Vanecek	2,133	32–13–4	68	
50	April 29	Pittsburgh	4–5	OT	Vanecek	2,133	32–13–5	69	

May: 4–2–0 (Home: 2–2–0; Road: 2–0–0)

Game	Date	Opponent	Score	OT	Decision	Attendance	Record	Points	Recap
51	May 1	Pittsburgh	0–3		Samsonov	2,133	32–14–5	69	
52	May 3	@ NY Rangers	6–3		Vanecek	1,800	33–14–5	71	
53	May 5	@ NY Rangers	4–2		Vanecek	1,800	34–14–5	73	
54	May 7	Philadelphia	2–4		Vanecek	2,133	34–15–5	73	
55	May 8	Philadelphia	2–1	OT	Anderson	2,133	35–15–5	75	
56	May 11	Boston	2–1		Vanecek	2,133	36–15–5	77	

Win (2 Points) Loss (0 points) Overtime/shootout loss (1 point) Postponement

=== Playoffs ===
2021 Stanley Cup playoffs
East Division First Round vs. (E3) Boston Bruins: Boston won 4–1

Game	Date	Opponent	Score	OT	Decision	Attendance	Series	Recap
1	May 15	Boston	3–2	OT	Anderson	5,333	1–0	
2	May 17	Boston	3–4	OT	Anderson	5,333	1–1	
3	May 19	@ Boston	2–3	2OT	Samsonov	4,565	1–2	
4	May 21	@ Boston	1–4		Samsonov	4,565	1–3	
5	May 23	Boston	1–3		Samsonov	5,333	1–4	

Win Loss

== Player statistics ==
=== Skaters ===
Regular season
Player	GP	G	A	Pts	+/−	PIM
Nicklas Backstrom	55	15	38	53	0	14
John Carlson	52	10	34	44	−5	12
T. J. Oshie	53	22	21	43	−3	18
Alexander Ovechkin	45	24	18	42	−7	12
Tom Wilson	47	13	20	33	+1	96
Evgeny Kuznetsov	41	9	20	29	+7	18
Justin Schultz	46	3	24	27	+12	10
Jakub Vrana^{‡}	39	11	14	25	+9	8
Lars Eller	44	8	15	23	−1	21
Conor Sheary	53	14	8	22	−1	14
Dmitry Orlov	51	8	14	22	+16	20
Daniel Sprong	42	13	7	20	+7	12
Brenden Dillon	56	2	17	19	+15	49
Garnet Hathaway	56	6	12	18	+7	66
Carl Hagelin	56	6	10	16	+7	19
Nic Dowd	56	11	4	15	+4	31
Nick Jensen	53	2	12	14	+5	14
Zdeno Chara	55	2	8	10	+5	44
Richard Panik^{‡}	36	3	6	9	−9	16
Anthony Mantha^{†}	14	4	4	8	0	8
Michael Raffl^{†}	10	1	2	3	+1	7
Trevor van Riemsdyk	20	1	2	3	−1	2
Michael Sgarbossa	5	0	2	2	+2	0
Daniel Carr	6	0	1	1	−2	2
Jonas Siegenthaler^{‡}	7	0	0	0	−3	2
Garrett Pilon	1	0	0	0	0	0
Brian Pinho	2	0	0	0	−2	0
Connor McMichael	1	0	0	0	0	2
Philippe Maillet	2	0	0	0	−1	0

Playoffs
Player	GP	G	A	Pts	+/−	PIM
Alexander Ovechkin	5	2	2	4	−2	2
T. J. Oshie	5	1	3	4	−2	0
Garnet Hathaway	5	2	1	3	+2	4
Dmitry Orlov	5	0	3	3	−1	6
Nic Dowd	5	2	0	2	+1	4
Tom Wilson	5	1	1	2	−3	6
John Carlson	5	0	2	2	−2	6
Anthony Mantha	5	0	2	2	0	6
Brenden Dillon	5	1	0	1	−4	0
Conor Sheary	5	1	0	1	−4	2
Daniel Sprong	3	0	1	1	0	4
Nicklas Backstrom	5	0	1	1	−2	0
Carl Hagelin	5	0	1	1	+1	0
Lars Eller	4	0	1	1	0	0
Evgeny Kuznetsov	3	0	0	0	−1	0
Daniel Carr	1	0	0	0	0	2
Nick Jensen	5	0	0	0	0	2
Michael Raffl	4	0	0	0	−2	4
Zdeno Chara	5	0	0	0	+1	2
Justin Schultz	5	0	0	0	−2	2

=== Goaltenders ===
Regular season
Player	GP	GS	TOI	W	L	OT	GA	GAA	SA	SV%	SO	G	A	PIM
Vitek Vanecek	37	36	2,115:29	21	10	4	95	2.69	1,031	.908	2	0	0	0
Ilya Samsonov	19	18	1,092:49	13	4	1	49	2.69	499	.902	2	0	1	0
Craig Anderson	4	2	168:44	2	1	0	6	2.13	71	.915	0	0	0	0

Playoffs
Player	GP	GS	TOI	W	L	GA	GAA	SA	SV%	SO	G	A	PIM
Craig Anderson	2	1	112:10	1	1	5	2.67	70	.929	0	0	0	0
Ilya Samsonov	3	3	200:55	0	3	10	2.99	99	.899	0	0	0	0
Vitek Vanecek	1	1	13:10	0	0	1	4.56	4	.750	0	0	0	0

^{†}Denotes player spent time with another team before joining the Capitals. Stats reflect time with the Capitals only.
^{‡}Denotes player was traded mid-season. Stats reflect time with the Capitals only.
Bold/italics denotes franchise record.

== Draft picks ==
Below are the Washington Capitals' selections at the 2020 NHL entry draft, which was originally scheduled for June 26–27, 2020 at the Bell Center in Montreal, Quebec, but was postponed on March 25, 2020, due to the COVID-19 pandemic. On October 6–7, 2020 the draft was held virtually via Video conference call from the NHL Network studio in Secaucus, New Jersey.

Round	#	Player	Pos	Nationality	College/Junior/Club team (League)
1	22	Hendrix Lapierre	C	Canada	Chicoutimi Sagueneens (QMJHL)
4	117	Bogdan Trineyev	RW	Russia	Dynamo Moscow 2 (MHL)
5	148	Bear Hughes	D	United States	Spokane Chiefs (WHL)
6	179	Garin Bjorklund	G	Canada	Medicine Hat Tigers (WHL)
7	211	Oskar Magunsson	LW	Sweden	Malmö Redhawks (SHL)
