= 2020–21 New York Islanders season =

National Hockey League season

2020–21 New York Islanders
- Division: 4th East
- 2020–21 record: 32–17–7
- Home record: 21–4–3
- Road record: 11–13–4
- Goals for: 156
- Goals against: 128

Team information
- General manager: Lou Lamoriello
- Coach: Barry Trotz
- Captain: Anders Lee
- Alternate captains: Josh Bailey; Cal Clutterbuck; Brock Nelson (Apr. 5 – Jun. 25)
- Arena: Nassau Veterans Memorial Coliseum
- Minor league affiliates: Bridgeport Sound Tigers (AHL); Worcester Railers (ECHL)

Team leaders
- Goals: Brock Nelson (18)
- Assists: Nick Leddy (29)
- Points: Mathew Barzal (45)
- Penalty minutes: Mathew Barzal (48)
- Plus/minus: 4 tied (+15)
- Wins: Semyon Varlamov (19)
- Goals against average: Semyon Varlamov (2.04)

The 2020–21 New York Islanders season was the 49th season in the franchise's history. It was their first full season in the Nassau Veterans Memorial Coliseum since returning to the arena full-time for the 2020–21 season, as well as their 45th overall and final season in the arena. In June 2020, the Nassau Veterans Memorial Coliseum's leaseholder announced that the arena would be closed and seek a new leaseholder, which was found in August 2020.

Due to the COVID-19 pandemic and COVID-19 cross-border travel restrictions imposed by the Government of Canada, the Islanders played a shortened 56-game regular season, which consisted of divisional play only, with the Islanders being temporarily realigned from the Metropolitan Division to the East Division.

Fan attendance in home games was prohibited until February 23, per an executive order from Governor of New York Andrew Cuomo. The Islanders reopened Nassau Veterans Memorial Coliseum to spectators on March 18.

The team made the playoffs for the third straight season when they defeated the New York Rangers on May 1, 2021. This marked the first time since the 2003–04 season that the Islanders clinched a playoff spot for a third consecutive season. They would go on to defeat the division champions Pittsburgh Penguins in the First round in six games. Game 6 of the series was the first series-clinching game at Nassau Veterans Memorial Coliseum since 1993. After defeating Pittsburgh, the Islanders would later compete against the Boston Bruins in the Second round and defeat them in six games. They were reseeded 3rd in the Stanley Cup semifinals, and competed against the Tampa Bay Lightning, where they were defeated in seven games.

== Standings ==
=== Divisional standings ===
East Division
Pos	Team	GP	W	L	OTL	RW	GF	GA	GD	Pts
1	y – Pittsburgh Penguins	56	37	16	3	29	196	156	+40	77
2	x – Washington Capitals	56	36	15	5	29	191	163	+28	77
3	x – Boston Bruins	56	33	16	7	25	168	136	+32	73
4	x – New York Islanders	56	32	17	7	24	156	128	+28	71
5	New York Rangers	56	27	23	6	24	177	157	+20	60
6	Philadelphia Flyers	56	25	23	8	17	163	201	−38	58
7	New Jersey Devils	56	19	30	7	15	145	194	−49	45
8	Buffalo Sabres	56	15	34	7	11	138	199	−61	37

Source: National Hockey League
Rules for classification: 1) Fewer number of games played (GP, only during regular season); 2) Greater number of regulation wins (RW); 3) Greater number of wins in regulation and overtime, excluding shootout wins (ROW); 4) Greater number of total wins, including shootouts (W); 5) Greater number of points earned in head-to-head play; if teams played an uneven number of head-to-head games, the result of the first game on the home ice of the team with the extra home game is discarded; 6) Greater goal differential (GD); 7) Greater number of goals scored (GF)
x – Clinched playoff spot; y – Clinched division

== Schedule and results ==
=== Regular season ===
The regular season schedule was published on December 23, 2020.

2020–21 game log

January: 3–4–2 (Home: 2–0–0; Road: 1–4–2)
#	Date	Visitor	Score	Home	OT	Decision	Attendance	Record	Pts	Recap
1	January 14	NY Islanders	4–0	NY Rangers		Varlamov	0	1–0–0	2
2	January 16	NY Islanders	0–5	NY Rangers		Sorokin	0	1–1–0	2
3	January 18	Boston	0–1	NY Islanders		Varlamov	0	2–1–0	4
4	January 21	New Jersey	1–4	NY Islanders		Varlamov	0	3–1–0	6
5	January 24	NY Islanders	0–2	New Jersey		Sorokin	0	3–2–0	6
6	January 26	NY Islanders	2–3	Washington		Varlamov	0	3–3–0	6
7	January 28	NY Islanders	3–6	Washington		Varlamov	0	3–4–0	6
8	January 30	NY Islanders	2–3	Philadelphia	OT	Varlamov	0	3–4–1	7
9	January 31	NY Islanders	3–4	Philadelphia	OT	Sorokin	0	3–4–2	8

February: 8–2–2 (Home: 5–0–2; Road: 3–2–0)
#	Date	Visitor	Score	Home	OT	Decision	Attendance	Record	Pts	Recap
—	February 2	Buffalo	–	NY Islanders	Postponed due to COVID-19 protocol; moved to February 22
—	February 4	Buffalo	–	NY Islanders	Postponed due to COVID-19 protocol; moved to March 4
10	February 6	Pittsburgh	3–4	NY Islanders		Varlamov	0	4–4–2	10
11	February 8	NY Islanders	2–0	NY Rangers		Varlamov	0	5–4–2	12
12	February 11	Pittsburgh	4–3	NY Islanders	SO	Varlamov	0	5–4–3	13
13	February 13	Boston	2–4	NY Islanders		Varlamov	0	6–4–3	15
14	February 15	NY Islanders	3–1	Buffalo		Varlamov	0	7–4–3	17
15	February 16	NY Islanders	3–0	Buffalo		Sorokin	0	8–4–3	19
16	February 18	NY Islanders	1–4	Pittsburgh		Varlamov	0	8–5–3	19
17	February 20	NY Islanders	2–3	Pittsburgh		Varlamov	0	8–6–3	19
18	February 22	Buffalo	2–3	NY Islanders		Varlamov	0	9–6–3	21
19	February 25	Boston	2–7	NY Islanders		Varlamov	0	10–6–3	23
20	February 27	Pittsburgh	4–3	NY Islanders	OT	Varlamov	0	10–6–4	24
21	February 28	Pittsburgh	0–2	NY Islanders		Sorokin	0	11–6–4	26

March: 11–4–0 (Home: 6–1–0; Road: 5–3–0)
#	Date	Visitor	Score	Home	OT	Decision	Attendance	Record	Pts	Recap
22	March 2	NY Islanders	2–1	New Jersey		Varlamov	1,800	12–6–4	28
23	March 4	Buffalo	2–5	NY Islanders		Sorokin	0	13–6–4	30
24	March 6	Buffalo	2–5	NY Islanders		Varlamov	0	14–6–4	32
25	March 7	Buffalo	2–5	NY Islanders		Sorokin	0	15–6–4	34
26	March 9	Boston	1–2	NY Islanders	SO	Varlamov	0	16–6–4	36
27	March 11	New Jersey	3–5	NY Islanders		Sorokin	1,000	17–6–4	38
28	March 13	NY Islanders	3–2	New Jersey		Varlamov	1,800	18–6–4	40
29	March 14	NY Islanders	3–2	New Jersey	SO	Sorokin	1,800	19–6–4	42
30	March 16	NY Islanders	1–3	Washington		Varlamov	0	19–7–4	42
31	March 18	Philadelphia	4–3	NY Islanders		Varlamov	1,400	19–8–4	42
32	March 20	Philadelphia	1–6	NY Islanders		Sorokin	1,400	20–8–4	44
33	March 22	NY Islanders	2–1	Philadelphia	OT	Sorokin	2,820	21–8–4	46
—	March 23	NY Islanders	–	Boston	Postponed due to COVID-19 protocol; moved to May 10
34	March 25	NY Islanders	4–3	Boston	OT	Varlamov	2,191	22–8–4	48
35	March 27	NY Islanders	3–6	Pittsburgh		Sorokin	2,800	22–9–4	48
36	March 29	NY Islanders	1–2	Pittsburgh		Varlamov	2,800	22–10–4	48

April: 8–5–1 (Home: 6–2–1; Road: 2–3–0)
#	Date	Visitor	Score	Home	OT	Decision	Attendance	Record	Pts	Recap
37	April 1	Washington	4–8	NY Islanders		Varlamov	1,400	23–10–4	50
38	April 3	Philadelphia	2–3	NY Islanders	SO	Sorokin	1,400	24–10–4	52
39	April 6	Washington	0–1	NY Islanders		Varlamov	1,400	25–10–4	54
40	April 8	Philadelphia	2–3	NY Islanders	SO	Sorokin	1,400	26–10–4	56
41	April 9	NY Rangers	4–1	NY Islanders		Varlamov	1,400	26–11–4	56
42	April 11	NY Rangers	2–3	NY Islanders	OT	Sorokin	1,400	27–11–4	58
43	April 15	NY Islanders	1–4	Boston		Varlamov	2,191	27–12–4	58
44	April 16	NY Islanders	0–3	Boston		Sorokin	2,191	27–13–4	58
45	April 18	NY Islanders	1–0	Philadelphia	OT	Sorokin	3,603	28–13–4	60
46	April 20	NY Rangers	1–6	NY Islanders		Varlamov	1,400	29–13–4	62
47	April 22	Washington	1–0	NY Islanders	SO	Varlamov	1,400	29–13–5	63
48	April 24	Washington	6–3	NY Islanders		Sorokin	1,400	29–14–5	63
49	April 27	NY Islanders	0–1	Washington		Sorokin	2,133	29–15–5	63
50	April 29	NY Islanders	4–0	NY Rangers		Varlamov	1,800	30–15–5	65

May: 2–2–2 (Home: 2–1–0; Road: 0–1–2)
#	Date	Visitor	Score	Home	OT	Decision	Attendance	Record	Pts	Recap
51	May 1	NY Rangers	0–3	NY Islanders		Varlamov	1,400	31–15–5	67
52	May 3	NY Islanders	2–4	Buffalo		Varlamov	0	31–16–5	67
53	May 4	NY Islanders	3–4	Buffalo	SO	Sorokin	0	31–16–6	68
54	May 6	New Jersey	2–1	NY Islanders		Varlamov	1,400	31–17–6	68
55	May 8	New Jersey	1–5	NY Islanders		Sorokin	— (Note: Spectators were in attendance, but the exact number was not reported.)	32–17–6	70
56	May 10	NY Islanders	2–3	Boston	OT	Sorokin	4,565	32–17–7	71

Legend: Win (2 points) Loss (0 points) Overtime/shootout loss (1 point) Postponement

=== Playoffs ===
The Islanders faced the Pittsburgh Penguins in the first round, defeating them in six games.

The Islanders faced the Boston Bruins in the second round, defeating them in six games.

The Islanders faced the Tampa Bay Lightning in the Stanley Cup semifinals, where they lost in seven games.

2021 Stanley Cup playoffs

East Division first round vs. (E1) Pittsburgh Penguins: New York won 4–2
#	Date	Visitor	Score	Home	OT	Decision	Attendance	Series	Recap
1	May 16	NY Islanders	4–3	Pittsburgh	OT	Sorokin	4,672	1–0
2	May 18	NY Islanders	1–2	Pittsburgh		Varlamov	9,344	1–1
3	May 20	Pittsburgh	5–4	NY Islanders		Varlamov	6,800	1–2
4	May 22	Pittsburgh	1–4	NY Islanders		Sorokin	6,800	2–2
5	May 24	NY Islanders	3–2	Pittsburgh	2OT	Sorokin	9,344	3–2
6	May 26	Pittsburgh	3–5	NY Islanders		Sorokin	9,000	4–2

East Division second round vs. (E3) Boston Bruins: New York won 4–2
#	Date	Visitor	Score	Home	OT	Decision	Attendance	Series	Recap
1	May 29	NY Islanders	2–5	Boston		Sorokin	17,400	0–1
2	May 31	NY Islanders	4–3	Boston	OT	Varlamov	17,400	1–1
3	June 3	Boston	2–1	NY Islanders	OT	Varlamov	12,000	1–2
4	June 5	Boston	1–4	NY Islanders		Varlamov	12,000	2–2
5	June 7	NY Islanders	5–4	Boston		Varlamov	17,400	3–2
6	June 9	Boston	2–6	NY Islanders		Varlamov	12,000	4–2

Stanley Cup semifinals vs. (C3) Tampa Bay Lightning: Tampa Bay won 4–3
#	Date	Visitor	Score	Home	OT	Decision	Attendance	Series	Recap
1	June 13	NY Islanders	2–1	Tampa Bay		Varlamov	14,513	1–0
2	June 15	NY Islanders	2–4	Tampa Bay		Varlamov	14,771	1–1
3	June 17	Tampa Bay	2–1	NY Islanders		Varlamov	12,978	1–2
4	June 19	Tampa Bay	2–3	NY Islanders		Varlamov	12,978	2–2
5	June 21	NY Islanders	0–8	Tampa Bay		Varlamov	14,791	2–3
6	June 23	Tampa Bay	2–3	NY Islanders	OT	Varlamov	12,978	3–3
7	June 25	NY Islanders	0–1	Tampa Bay		Varlamov	14,805	3–4

Legend: Win Loss

== Player statistics ==
As of June 25, 2021

=== Skaters ===
Regular season
Player	GP	G	A	Pts	+/−	PIM
Mathew Barzal	55	17	28	45	+15	48
Josh Bailey	54	8	27	35	+12	4
Brock Nelson	56	18	15	33	–5	14
Jordan Eberle	55	16	17	33	+9	16
Nick Leddy	56	2	29	31	–3	8
Anthony Beauvillier	47	15	13	28	+15	12
Jean-Gabriel Pageau	54	14	14	28	+10	10
Oliver Wahlstrom	44	12	9	21	+2	21
Anders Lee	27	12	7	19	+11	12
Ryan Pulock	56	2	15	17	+15	8
Scott Mayfield	56	2	13	15	+2	38
Casey Cizikas	56	7	7	14	–2	27
Adam Pelech	56	4	10	14	+15	18
Noah Dobson	46	3	11	14	+1	8
Matt Martin	54	6	5	11	–2	36
Cal Clutterbuck	50	4	7	11	−5	10
Leo Komarov	33	1	7	8	+7	15
Andy Greene	55	1	4	5	+9	6
Kyle Palmieri^{†}	17	2	2	4	–3	2
Michael Dal Colle	26	1	3	4	+1	4
Kieffer Bellows	14	3	0	3	0	4
Sebastian Aho	3	1	1	2	−1	2
Travis Zajac^{†}	13	1	1	2	−1	0
Thomas Hickey	5	0	2	2	+5	0
Ross Johnston	12	0	1	1	–3	35
Braydon Coburn^{†}	3	0	0	0	0	4
Dmytro Timashov	1	0	0	0	–2	0
Austin Czarnik	4	0	0	0	−1	0

Playoffs
Player	GP	G	A	Pts	+/−	PIM
Mathew Barzal	19	6	8	14	0	19
Josh Bailey	19	6	7	13	−2	4
Anthony Beauvillier	19	5	8	13	−1	4
Jean-Gabriel Pageau	19	3	10	13	+9	6
Brock Nelson	19	7	5	12	−1	4
Jordan Eberle	19	4	7	11	−1	4
Kyle Palmieri	19	7	2	9	+5	10
Cal Clutterbuck	19	4	3	7	+5	10
Noah Dobson	19	0	7	7	+1	0
Ryan Pulock	19	4	2	6	−3	4
Scott Mayfield	19	2	4	6	+12	25
Nick Leddy	19	0	6	6	+2	2
Casey Cizikas	19	2	3	5	0	2
Adam Pelech	19	1	4	5	−1	13
Oliver Wahlstrom	5	1	2	3	+2	8
Leo Komarov	19	0	3	3	−1	14
Matt Martin	19	1	1	2	+1	43
Travis Zajac	14	1	1	2	+2	6
Andy Greene	19	0	1	1	+1	8

=== Goaltenders ===
Regular season
Player	GP	GS	TOI	W	L	OT	GA	GAA	SA	SV%	SO	G	A	PIM
Semyon Varlamov	36	35	2,116:56	19	11	4	72	2.04	1,020	.929	7	0	1	2
Ilya Sorokin	22	21	1,271:47	13	6	3	46	2.17	563	.918	3	0	0	0

Playoffs
Player	GP	GS	TOI	W	L	GA	GAA	SA	SV%	SO	G	A	PIM
Semyon Varlamov	14	14	797:26	7	7	34	2.56	437	.922	0	0	0	0
Ilya Sorokin	7	5	386:58	4	1	18	2.79	230	.922	0	0	0	2

- ^{†} Denotes player spent time with another team before joining the Islanders. Stats reflect time with the Islanders only.
- ^{‡} Denotes player was traded mid-season. Stats reflect time with the Islanders only.
- Bold/italics denotes franchise record.

== Awards and honors ==
=== Awards ===
Regular season
Player	Award	Date
Lou Lamoriello	Jim Gregory General Manager of the Year Award	June 22, 2021

== Transactions ==
The Islanders have been involved in the following transactions during the 2020–21 season.

=== Trades ===
Date	Details		Ref
October 11, 2020	To Colorado Avalanche Kyle Burroughs	To New York Islanders A. J. Greer	
October 12, 2020	To Colorado Avalanche Devon Toews	To New York Islanders 2nd-round pick in 2021; 2nd-round pick in 2022	
December 11, 2020	To Detroit Red Wings Future considerations	To New York Islanders Dmytro Timashov	
April 7, 2021	To New Jersey Devils A. J. Greer; Mason Jobst; 1st-round pick in 2021; Conditional 4th-round pick in 2022	To New York Islanders Kyle Palmieri; Travis Zajac	
April 11, 2021	To Ottawa Senators 7th-round pick in 2022	To New York Islanders Braydon Coburn	

=== Free agents ===
Date	Player	Team	Contract term	Ref
October 9, 2020	Christopher Gibson	to Tampa Bay Lightning	1-year	
October 9, 2020	Thomas Greiss	to Detroit Red Wings	2-year	
October 13, 2020	Austin Czarnik	from Calgary Flames	2-year	
October 29, 2020	Seth Helgeson	to Bridgeport Sound Tigers (AHL)	1-year	
December 23, 2020	Jared Coreau	to Bratislava Capitals (IHL)	1-year	
December 30, 2020	Derick Brassard	to Arizona Coyotes	1-year	
January 9, 2021	Travis St. Denis	to Binghamton Devils (AHL)	1-year	
January 21, 2021	Jordan Schmaltz	to Tucson Roadrunners (AHL)	1-year	
January 22, 2021	Tom Kühnhackl	to Bridgeport Sound Tigers (AHL)	1-year	
January 22, 2021	Andrew Ladd	to Bridgeport Sound Tigers (AHL)	1-year	
April 9, 2021	Ken Appleby	from Bridgeport Sound Tigers (AHL)	2-year	

=== Retirement ===
Date	Player	Ref
November 25, 2020	Johnny Boychuk	

=== Signings ===
Date	Player	Contract term	Ref
October 5, 2020	Sebastian Aho	2-year	
October 13, 2020	Grant Hutton	2-year	
October 27, 2020	A. J. Greer	1-year	
October 27, 2020	Josh Ho-Sang	1-year	
October 27, 2020	Mitchell Vande Sompel	2-year	
October 27, 2020	Parker Wotherspoon	2-year	
November 4, 2020	Ryan Pulock	2-year	
January 11, 2021	Mathew Barzal	3-year	
January 11, 2021	Andy Greene	1-year	
January 11, 2021	Matt Martin	4-year	
January 14, 2021	Cory Schneider	1-year	
February 12, 2021	Robin Salo	2-year	
March 19, 2021	Anatolii Golyshev	1-year	
April 14, 2021	Collin Adams	2-year	
May 13, 2021	Reece Newkirk	3-year	

== Draft picks ==
Below are the New York Islanders' selections at the 2020 NHL entry draft, which was held on October 6 and 7, 2020, in a remote format, with teams convening via videoconferencing, and Commissioner Gary Bettman announcing selections from the NHL Network studios in Secaucus, New Jersey. It was originally scheduled to be held on June 26–27, 2020, at the Bell Centre in Montreal, but was postponed on March 25, 2020, due to the COVID-19 pandemic and the conclusion of the 2020 Stanley Cup playoffs.

Round	#	Player	Pos	Nationality	College/junior/club team
3	90	Alexander Ljungkrantz	LW	Sweden	Brynäs IF J20 (J20 SuperElit)
4	121	Alex Jefferies	LW	United States	The Frederick Gunn School (Connecticut)
5	152	William Dufour	RW	Canada	Drummondville Voltigeurs (QMJHL)
6	183	Matias Rajaniemi	D	Finland	Lahti Pelicans (Liiga)
7	214	Henrik Tikkanen	G	Finland	IPH (Mestis)
