= 2020–21 New York Rangers season =

National Hockey League season

2020–21 New York Rangers
- Division: 5th East
- 2020–21 record: 27–23–6
- Home record: 14–11–3
- Road record: 13–12–3
- Goals for: 177
- Goals against: 157

Team information
- General manager: Jeff Gorton (Jan. 14 – May 5); Chris Drury (May 5–8)
- Coach: David Quinn
- Captain: Vacant
- Alternate captains: Chris Kreider; Artemi Panarin; Jacob Trouba; Mika Zibanejad
- Arena: Madison Square Garden
- Minor league affiliates: Hartford Wolf Pack (AHL); Maine Mariners (ECHL)

Team leaders
- Goals: Mika Zibanejad (24)
- Assists: Adam Fox (42)
- Points: Artemi Panarin (58)
- Penalty minutes: Brendan Smith (73)
- Plus/minus: Ryan Lindgren (+20)
- Wins: Igor Shesterkin (16)
- Goals against average: Keith Kinkaid (2.59)

The 2020–21 New York Rangers season was the franchise's 94th season of play and their 95th season overall. Following the buyout of his contract on September 30, 2020, Henrik Lundqvist was not on the roster for the first time since the 2005–06 season. Before the season, the Rangers received the first overall pick in the draft lottery of the 2020 NHL entry draft. They drafted Alexis Lafrenière, who became only the second player to be drafted first overall by the Rangers, after André Veilleux in 1965. On December 20, 2020, the league temporarily realigned into four divisions with no conferences due to the COVID-19 pandemic and the ongoing closure of the Canada–United States border. As a result of this realignment, the Rangers played this season in the East Division and only played games against the other teams in their new division during the regular season.

Fan attendance in home games was prohibited until February 23, 2021, per an executive order from Governor of New York Andrew Cuomo. The Rangers reopened Madison Square Garden to spectators on February 26.

On March 17, head coach David Quinn and his assistant coaches, Jacques Martin, David Oliver, and Greg Brown were unavailable to coach the Rangers' game against the Philadelphia Flyers because of COVID-19 protocols and health and safety guidelines. A temporary coaching staff was called in and the team was coached by head coach Kris Knoblauch and assistant coach Gord Murphy from the American Hockey League's Hartford Wolf Pack, and the team's associate general manager Chris Drury. This was the first time in the NHL an entire coaching staff was not allowed to be in the arena to coach a game due to a pandemic. The Rangers won the game 9–0, which was the largest margin of victory since March 31, 1986, when they won 9–0 against the New Jersey Devils.

The Rangers scored the most hat tricks of any NHL team during the season. The players were – Mika Zibanejad (3), Chris Kreider (2), and Pavel Buchnevich (1). This was the most since the 1991–92 season when the team had eight.

On May 3, the Rangers were eliminated from playoff contention after a 6–3 loss to the Washington Capitals. Two days later, Rangers general manager Jeff Gorton and president/alternative governor John Davidson were both relieved of their duties by the organization. They were replaced by former Rangers captain Chris Drury who was named the new president and general manager.

On May 12, the Rangers fired head coach David Quinn after the team failed to make the playoffs. Assistant coaches Jacques Martin, David Oliver and Greg Brown were also fired.

== Standings ==
=== Divisional standings ===
East Division
Pos	Team	GP	W	L	OTL	RW	GF	GA	GD	Pts
1	y – Pittsburgh Penguins	56	37	16	3	29	196	156	+40	77
2	x – Washington Capitals	56	36	15	5	29	191	163	+28	77
3	x – Boston Bruins	56	33	16	7	25	168	136	+32	73
4	x – New York Islanders	56	32	17	7	24	156	128	+28	71
5	New York Rangers	56	27	23	6	24	177	157	+20	60
6	Philadelphia Flyers	56	25	23	8	17	163	201	−38	58
7	New Jersey Devils	56	19	30	7	15	145	194	−49	45
8	Buffalo Sabres	56	15	34	7	11	138	199	−61	37

Source: National Hockey League
Rules for classification: 1) Fewer number of games played (GP, only during regular season); 2) Greater number of regulation wins (RW); 3) Greater number of wins in regulation and overtime, excluding shootout wins (ROW); 4) Greater number of total wins, including shootouts (W); 5) Greater number of points earned in head-to-head play; if teams played an uneven number of head-to-head games, the result of the first game on the home ice of the team with the extra home game is discarded; 6) Greater goal differential (GD); 7) Greater number of goals scored (GF)
x – Clinched playoff spot; y – Clinched division

== Schedule and results ==
=== Regular season ===
The regular season schedule was published on December 23, 2020.

2020–21 game log
January: 2–4–2, 6 points (Home: 1–2–1; Road: 1–2–1)

Game	Date	Opponent	Score	OT	Decision	Location	Attendance	Record	Points	Recap
1	January 14	NY Islanders	0–4		Shesterkin	Madison Square Garden	0	0–1–0	0	
2	January 16	NY Islanders	5–0		Georgiev	Madison Square Garden	0	1–1–0	2	
3	January 19	New Jersey	3–4		Georgiev	Madison Square Garden	0	1–2–0	2	
4	January 22	@ Pittsburgh	3–4	SO	Shesterkin	PPG Paints Arena	0	1–2–1	3	
5	January 24	@ Pittsburgh	2–3		Shesterkin	PPG Paints Arena	0	1–3–1	3	
6	January 26	@ Buffalo	2–3		Georgiev	KeyBank Center	0	1–4–1	3	
7	January 28	@ Buffalo	3–2	OT	Shesterkin	KeyBank Center	0	2–4–1	5	
8	January 30	Pittsburgh	4–5	OT	Georgiev	Madison Square Garden	0	2–4–2	6	

February: 5–5–1, 11 points (Home: 3–4–1; Road: 2–1–0)

Game	Date	Opponent	Score	OT	Decision	Location	Attendance	Record	Points	Recap
9	February 1	Pittsburgh	3–1		Shesterkin	Madison Square Garden	0	3–4–2	8	
10	February 4	Washington	4–2		Shesterkin	Madison Square Garden	0	4–4–2	10	
—	February 6	@ New Jersey	–	Postponed due to COVID-19 protocol; moved to March 4						
11	February 8	NY Islanders	0–2		Shesterkin	Madison Square Garden	0	4–5–2	10	
12	February 10	Boston	2–3	OT	Georgiev	Madison Square Garden	0	4–5–3	11	
13	February 12	Boston	0–1		Shesterkin	Madison Square Garden	0	4–6–3	11	
—	February 14	Philadelphia	–	Postponed due to COVID-19 protocol; moved to April 22						
14	February 16	New Jersey	2–5		Shesterkin	Madison Square Garden	0	4–7–3	11	
15	February 18	@ Philadelphia	3–2	SO	Georgiev	Wells Fargo Center	0	5–7–3	13	
16	February 20	@ Washington	4–1		Shesterkin	Capital One Arena	0	6–7–3	15	
17	February 24	@ Philadelphia	3–4		Shesterkin	Wells Fargo Center	0	6–8–3	15	
18	February 26	Boston	6–2		Georgiev	Madison Square Garden	1,800	7–8–3	17	
19	February 28	Boston	1–4		Shesterkin	Madison Square Garden	1,800	7–9–3	17	

March: 9–6–1, 19 points (Home: 4–0–1; Road: 5–6–0)

Game	Date	Opponent	Score	OT	Decision	Location	Attendance	Record	Points	Recap
20	March 2	Buffalo	3–2		Shesterkin	Madison Square Garden	1,800	8–9–3	19	
21	March 4	@ New Jersey	6–1		Shesterkin	Prudential Center	1,800	9–9–3	21	
22	March 6	@ New Jersey	6–3		Georgiev	Prudential Center	1,800	10–9–3	23	
23	March 7	@ Pittsburgh	1–5		Georgiev	PPG Paints Arena	2,800	10–10–3	23	
24	March 9	@ Pittsburgh	2–4		Kinkaid	PPG Paints Arena	2,800	10–11–3	23	
25	March 11	@ Boston	0–4		Georgiev	TD Garden	0	10–12–3	23	
26	March 13	@ Boston	4–0		Kinkaid	TD Garden	0	11–12–3	25	
27	March 15	Philadelphia	4–5	OT	Kinkaid	Madison Square Garden	1,639	11–12–4	26	
28	March 17	Philadelphia	9–0		Georgiev	Madison Square Garden	1,723	12–12–4	28	
29	March 19	@ Washington	1–2		Georgiev	Capital One Arena	0	12–13–4	28	
30	March 20	@ Washington	3–1		Kinkaid	Capital One Arena	0	13–13–4	30	
31	March 22	Buffalo	5–3		Kinkaid	Madison Square Garden	1,800	14–13–4	32	
32	March 25	@ Philadelphia	8–3		Shesterkin	Wells Fargo Center	2,854	15–13–4	34	
33	March 27	@ Philadelphia	1–2		Shesterkin	Wells Fargo Center	3,069	15–14–4	34	
34	March 28	@ Washington	4–5		Kinkaid	Capital One Arena	0	15–15–4	34	
35	March 30	Washington	5–2		Shesterkin	Madison Square Garden	1,761	16–15–4	36	

April: 10–4–2, 22 points (Home: 6–3–0; Road: 4–1–2)

Game	Date	Opponent	Score	OT	Decision	Location	Attendance	Record	Points	Recap
36	April 1	@ Buffalo	3–2	OT	Shesterkin	KeyBank Center	0	17–15–4	38	
37	April 3	@ Buffalo	2–3	SO	Shesterkin	KeyBank Center	302	17–15–5	39	
38	April 6	Pittsburgh	8–4		Shesterkin	Madison Square Garden	1,693	18–15–5	41	
39	April 8	Pittsburgh	2–5		Shesterkin	Madison Square Garden	1,800	18–16–5	41	
40	April 9	@ NY Islanders	4–1		Georgiev	Nassau Coliseum	1,400	19–16–5	43	
41	April 11	@ NY Islanders	2–3	OT	Shesterkin	Nassau Coliseum	1,400	19–16–6	44	
42	April 13	@ New Jersey	3–0		Shesterkin	Prudential Center	3,600	20–16–6	46	
43	April 15	New Jersey	4–0		Shesterkin	Madison Square Garden	1,688	21–16–6	48	
44	April 17	New Jersey	6–3		Shesterkin	Madison Square Garden	1,800	22–16–6	50	
45	April 18	@ New Jersey	5–3		Georgiev	Prudential Center	3,500	23–16–6	52	
46	April 20	@ NY Islanders	1–6		Shesterkin	Nassau Coliseum	1,400	23–17–6	52	
47	April 22	Philadelphia	2–3		Shesterkin	Madison Square Garden	1,800	23–18–6	52	
48	April 23	Philadelphia	4–1		Georgiev	Madison Square Garden	1,800	24–18–6	54	
49	April 25	Buffalo	6–3		Shesterkin	Madison Square Garden	1,800	25–18–6	56	
50	April 27	Buffalo	3–1		Shesterkin	Madison Square Garden	1,796	26–18–6	58	
51	April 29	NY Islanders	0–4		Shesterkin	Madison Square Garden	1,800	26–19–6	58	

May: 1–4–0, 2 points (Home: 0–2–0; Road: 1–2–0)

Game	Date	Opponent	Score	OT	Decision	Location	Attendance	Record	Points	Recap
52	May 1	@ NY Islanders	0–3		Georgiev	Nassau Coliseum	1,400	26–20–6	58	
53	May 3	Washington	3–6		Shesterkin	Madison Square Garden	1,800	26–21–6	58	
54	May 5	Washington	2–4		Georgiev	Madison Square Garden	1,800	26–22–6	58	
55	May 6	@ Boston	0–4		Shesterkin	TD Garden	2,191	26–23–6	58	
56	May 8	@ Boston	5–4		Shesterkin	TD Garden	2,191	27–23–6	60	

Win (2 points) Loss (0 points) Overtime/shootout loss (1 point) Postponement

== Player statistics ==
As of May 8, 2021

=== Skaters ===
Regular season
Player	GP	G	A	Pts	+/−	PIM
Artemi Panarin	42	17	41	58	+14	6
Mika Zibanejad	56	24	26	50	+2	18
Ryan Strome	56	14	35	49	+6	39
Pavel Buchnevich	54	20	28	48	+12	42
Adam Fox	55	5	42	47	+19	14
Chris Kreider	50	20	10	30	–1	34
Colin Blackwell	47	12	10	22	+2	15
Filip Chytil	42	8	14	22	+9	10
Alexis Lafrenière	56	12	9	21	–7	8
Kaapo Kakko	48	9	8	17	+3	10
Ryan Lindgren	51	1	15	16	+20	35
Kevin Rooney	54	8	6	14	0	54
K'Andre Miller	53	5	7	12	+9	20
Jacob Trouba	38	2	10	12	+3	22
Brendan Smith	48	5	5	10	+3	73
Julien Gauthier	30	2	6	8	–6	14
Phillip Di Giuseppe	31	1	7	8	+2	13
Brendan Lemieux^{‡}	31	2	5	7	0	59
Brett Howden	42	1	6	7	–2	11
Vitali Kravtsov	20	2	2	4	–6	4
Libor Hájek	44	2	2	4	+2	10
Anthony Bitetto	14	1	3	4	–8	20
Zac Jones	10	0	4	4	–2	2
Jack Johnson	13	1	0	1	–5	8
Jonny Brodzinski	5	1	0	1	0	4
Morgan Barron	5	1	0	1	0	4
Tony DeAngelo	6	0	1	1	–6	4
Tarmo Reunanen	4	0	1	1	+1	0
Justin Richards	1	0	1	1	+1	0
Tim Gettinger	2	0	0	0	–2	0

=== Goaltenders ===
Regular season
Player	GP	GS	TOI	W	L	OT	GA	GAA	SA	SV%	SO	G	A	PIM
Igor Shesterkin	35	31	1,899:01	16	14	3	83	2.62	987	.916	2	0	0	0
Alexandar Georgiev	19	18	973:56	8	7	2	44	2.71	465	.905	2	0	1	0
Keith Kinkaid	9	7	485:53	3	2	1	21	2.59	205	.898	1	0	0	0

- ^{†} Denotes player spent time with another team before joining the Rangers. Stats reflect time with the Rangers only.
- ^{‡} Denotes player was traded mid-season. Stats reflect time with the Rangers only.
- Bold/italics denotes franchise record.

== Awards and honors ==
=== Awards ===
Regular season
Player	Award	Date
Adam Fox	Steven McDonald Extra Effort Award	April 29, 2021
Adam Fox	James Norris Memorial Trophy	June 29, 2021

=== Milestones ===
Regular season
Player	Milestone	Reached
Alexis Lafrenière	1st NHL career game	January 14, 2021
K'Andre Miller	1st NHL career game	January 14, 2021
K'Andre Miller	1st NHL career point	January 22, 2021
K'Andre Miller	1st NHL career goal	January 26, 2021
Alexis Lafrenière	1st NHL career goal	January 28, 2021
Kevin Rooney	100th NHL career game	January 28, 2021
Artem Panarin	400th NHL career game	February 1, 2021
Julien Gauthier	1st NHL career goal	February 10, 2021
Ryan Strome	100th NHL career goal 200th NHL career point	February 20, 2021
Alexis Lafrenière	1st NHL career assist	February 26, 2021
Pavel Buchnevich	100th NHL career assist	March 7, 2021
Tarmo Reunanen	1st NHL career game 1st NHL career assist 1st NHL career point	March 15, 2021
Jacob Trouba	50th NHL career goal	March 17, 2021
Brendan Smith	500th NHL career game	March 19, 2021
Adam Fox	100th NHL career game	March 22, 2021
Vitali Kravtsov	1st NHL career game	April 3, 2021
Vitali Kravtsov	1st NHL career assist 1st NHL career point	April 11, 2021
Pavel Buchnevich	Scored the 20,000th goal in Rangers franchise history	April 13, 2021
Igor Shesterkin	1st NHL career shutout	April 13, 2021
Artem Panarin	300th NHL career assist	April 17, 2021
Pavel Buchnevich	1st NHL career hat trick	April 17, 2021
Vitali Kravtsov	1st NHL career goal	April 18, 2021
Zac Jones	1st NHL career game	April 22, 2021
Zac Jones	1st NHL career point	April 25, 2021
Ryan Strome	300th NHL career point	April 27, 2021
Morgan Barron	1st NHL career game	May 1, 2021
Morgan Barron	1st NHL career goal 1st NHL career point	May 5, 2021
Justin Richards	1st NHL career game 1st NHL career assist 1st NHL career point	May 8, 2021
Mika Zibanejad	200th NHL career goal	May 8, 2021

=== Records ===
Regular season
Player	Record	Reached
Chris Kreider	161st NHL career goal (2nd most goals by American-born Ranger)	February 1, 2021
Mika Zibanejad	Most points in one period with 6 (tied with Bryan Trottier)	March 17, 2021
Mika Zibanejad	1st player in NHL history to record 6+ points in consecutive games vs. one opponent within a regular season (6 goals, 6 assists against Philadelphia Flyers)	March 25, 2021
Artemi Panarin	Most assists (93) in first 100 games (98) in Rangers history (passing Mark Messier)	April 9, 2021

== Transactions ==
The Rangers were involved in the following transactions during the 2020–21 season.

=== Trades ===
Date	Details		Ref
October 6, 2020	To Calgary Flames CAR's 1st-round pick in 2020; 3rd-round pick in 2020	To New York Rangers 1st-round pick in 2020	
October 7, 2020	To Los Angeles Kings Lias Andersson	To New York Rangers VGK's 2nd-round pick in 2020	
October 7, 2020	To San Jose Sharks 7th-round pick in 2020; VAN's 7th-round pick in 2020	To New York Rangers 5th-round pick in 2020	
March 27, 2021	To Los Angeles Kings Brendan Lemieux	To New York Rangers 4th-round pick in 2021	

=== Free agents ===
Date	Player	Team	Contract term	Ref
October 9, 2020	Anthony Bitetto	from Winnipeg Jets	2-year	
October 9, 2020	Colin Blackwell	from Nashville Predators	2-year	
October 9, 2020	Jonny Brodzinski	from San Jose Sharks	1-year	
October 9, 2020	Anthony Greco	from San Jose Sharks	2-year	
October 9, 2020	Jack Johnson	from Pittsburgh Penguins	1-year	
October 9, 2020	Keith Kinkaid	from Montreal Canadiens	2-year	
October 9, 2020	Kevin Rooney	from New Jersey Devils	2-year	
October 10, 2020	Jesper Fast	to Carolina Hurricanes	3-year	
October 10, 2020	Vinni Lettieri	to Anaheim Ducks	1-year	
October 11, 2020	Danny O'Regan	to Vegas Golden Knights	1-year	
October 14, 2020	Greg McKegg	to Boston Bruins	1-year	
October 19, 2020	Steven Fogarty	to Buffalo Sabres	1-year	
November 13, 2020	Micheal Haley	to Ottawa Senators	1-year	
December 31, 2020	Jean-François Bérubé	to Ontario Reign (AHL)	1-year	
January 9, 2021	Ryan Gropp	to Västerviks IK (HockeyAllsvenskan)	1-year	
January 12, 2021	Boo Nieves	to Tampa Bay Lightning	1-year	
March 4, 2021	Mason Geertsen	from Hartford Wolf Pack (AHL)	2-year	
June 4, 2021	Yegor Rykov	to Severstal Cherepovets (KHL)	2-year	

=== Signings ===
Date	Player	Contract term	Ref
October 9, 2020	Brandon Crawley	1-year	
October 12, 2020	Alexis Lafrenière	3-year	
October 13, 2020	Phillip Di Giuseppe	1-year	
October 15, 2020	Tony DeAngelo	2-year	
October 15, 2020	Alexandar Georgiev	2-year	
October 16, 2020	Gabriel Fontaine	1-year	
October 16, 2020	Darren Raddysh	1-year	
November 6, 2020	Brendan Lemieux	2-year	
November 6, 2020	Ryan Strome	2-year	
March 4, 2021	Braden Schneider	3-year	
March 29, 2021	Hunter Skinner	3-year	
April 13, 2021	Zac Jones	3-year	
April 19, 2021	William Cuylle	3-year	
April 21, 2021	Karl Henriksson	3-year	
April 29, 2021	Lauri Pajuniemi	2-year	
May 10, 2021	Ryan Lindgren	3-year	
June 3, 2021	Nils Lundkvist	3-year	

== Draft picks ==
Below are the New York Rangers' selections at the 2020 NHL entry draft, which was held on October 6 and 7, 2020, in a remote format, with teams convening via videoconferencing, and Commissioner Gary Bettman announcing selections from the NHL Network studios in Secaucus, New Jersey. It was originally scheduled to be held on June 26–27, 2020, at the Bell Centre in Montreal, but was postponed on March 25, 2020, due to the COVID-19 pandemic and the conclusion of the 2020 Stanley Cup playoffs.

Round	#	Player	Pos	Nationality	College/junior/club team
1	1	Alexis Lafrenière	LW	Canada	Rimouski Océanic (QMJHL)
1	19^{1}	Braden Schneider	D	Canada	Brandon Wheat Kings (WHL)
2	60^{2}	William Cuylle	LW	Canada	Windsor Spitfires (OHL)
3	92^{3}	Oliver Tärnström	C	Sweden	AIK IF J20 (J20 SuperElit)
4	103	Dylan Garand	G	Canada	Kamloops Blazers (WHL)
5	127^{4}	Evan Vierling	C	Canada	Barrie Colts (OHL)
5	134	Brett Berard	LW	United States	U.S. NTDP U-18 (USDP)
6	165	Matt Rempe	C	Canada	Seattle Thunderbirds (WHL)
7	197^{5}	Hugo Ollas	G	Sweden	Linköping HC J20 (J20 SuperElit)

1. The Calgary Flames' first-round pick went to the New York Rangers as the result of a trade on October 6, 2020, that sent Carolina Hurricanes' first-round pick and a third-round pick both in 2020 (22nd and 72nd overall) to Calgary in exchange for this pick.
2. The Los Angeles Kings' second-round pick went to the New York Rangers as the result of a trade on October 7, 2020, that sent Lias Andersson to Los Angeles in exchange for this pick.
3. The Dallas Stars' third-round pick went to the New York Rangers as the result of a trade on February 23, 2019, that sent Mats Zuccarello to Dallas in exchange for a conditional second-round pick in 2019 and this pick (being conditional at the time of the trade).
4. The San Jose Sharks' fifth-round pick went to the New York Rangers as the result of a trade on October 7, 2020, that sent a seventh-round pick and Vancouver Canucks' seventh-round pick both in 2020 (196th and 206th overall) to San Jose in exchange for this pick.
5. The Nashville Predators' seventh-round pick went to the New York Rangers as the result of a trade on February 6, 2019, that sent Cody McLeod to Nashville in exchange for this pick.
