= 2020–21 Buffalo Sabres season =

Professional ice hockey team season

2020–21 Buffalo Sabres
- Division: 8th East
- 2020–21 record: 15–34–7
- Home record: 8–16–4
- Road record: 7–18–3
- Goals for: 138
- Goals against: 199

Team information
- General manager: Kevyn Adams
- Coach: Ralph Krueger (Jan. 14 – Mar. 17); Don Granato (interim, Mar. 17 – May 8)
- Captain: Jack Eichel
- Alternate captains: Jake McCabe; Kyle Okposo
- Arena: KeyBank Center
- Minor league affiliates: Rochester Americans (AHL); Cincinnati Cyclones (ECHL)

Team leaders
- Goals: Sam Reinhart (25)
- Assists: Victor Olofsson (19)
- Points: Sam Reinhart (40)
- Penalty minutes: Rasmus Ristolainen (36)
- Plus/minus: Steven Fogarty; Jake McCabe (+2)
- Wins: Linus Ullmark (9)
- Goals against average: Linus Ullmark (2.63)

The 2020–21 Buffalo Sabres season was the 51st season for the National Hockey League (NHL) franchise that was established on May 22, 1970.

On December 20, 2020, the league temporarily realigned into four divisions with no conferences due to the COVID-19 pandemic and the ongoing closure of the Canada–United States border. As a result of this realignment the Sabres played this season in the East Division and only played games against the other teams in their new division during the regular season.

With an 18th consecutive loss on March 29, 2021, the Sabres equalled the NHL record for the longest losing streak in a season, tied with the 2003–04 Pittsburgh Penguins. In that game, the Sabres blew a 3–0 lead and lost 4–3 in overtime.

On April 17, the Sabres were eliminated from playoff contention after a 3–2 loss to the Pittsburgh Penguins, extending their playoff drought to ten seasons, tying an NHL record.

In the Sabres' 18-game losing streak, they were 0–15–3 (two overtime losses and one shootout loss). In the first 34 games, they went 6–23–5 (.250) for 17 points. In their final 22 games, they went 9–11–2 (.455), ultimately going 15–34–7 for 37 points. For the fourth time in eight seasons, the Sabres had the worst record in the whole NHL. Their .330 points percentage was their worst since 2014-15.

== Off-season ==
The Sabres introduced three new jerseys for the season. On August 11, 2020, the Sabres revealed their new uniforms, which was an updated version of the team's original jerseys. The team reintroduced their original royal blue, gold, and white colors, which was worn by the team from 1970 to 1996. On November 16, 2020, the NHL introduced Adidas "Reverse Retro" jerseys for all 31 teams, which feature throwback uniforms with a modern twist. The Sabres' Reverse Retro jersey is a modern update to the team's first third jersey worn in 2000, with the exception being that it was done in the team's current colors on a white template.

== Standings ==
=== Divisional standings ===
East Division
Pos	Team	GP	W	L	OTL	RW	GF	GA	GD	Pts
1	y – Pittsburgh Penguins	56	37	16	3	29	196	156	+40	77
2	x – Washington Capitals	56	36	15	5	29	191	163	+28	77
3	x – Boston Bruins	56	33	16	7	25	168	136	+32	73
4	x – New York Islanders	56	32	17	7	24	156	128	+28	71
5	New York Rangers	56	27	23	6	24	177	157	+20	60
6	Philadelphia Flyers	56	25	23	8	17	163	201	−38	58
7	New Jersey Devils	56	19	30	7	15	145	194	−49	45
8	Buffalo Sabres	56	15	34	7	11	138	199	−61	37

Source: National Hockey League
Rules for classification: 1) Fewer number of games played (GP, only during regular season); 2) Greater number of regulation wins (RW); 3) Greater number of wins in regulation and overtime, excluding shootout wins (ROW); 4) Greater number of total wins, including shootouts (W); 5) Greater number of points earned in head-to-head play; if teams played an uneven number of head-to-head games, the result of the first game on the home ice of the team with the extra home game is discarded; 6) Greater goal differential (GD); 7) Greater number of goals scored (GF)
x – Clinched playoff spot; y – Clinched division

== Schedule and results ==
=== Regular season ===
The regular season schedule was published on December 23, 2020.

2020–21 game log

January: 4–4–2 (Home: 2–3–1; Road: 2–1–1)
#	Date	Visitor	Score	Home	OT	Decision	Attendance	Record	Pts	Recap
1	January 14	Washington	6–4	Buffalo		Hutton	0	0–1–0	0
2	January 15	Washington	2–1	Buffalo		Ullmark	0	0–2–0	0
3	January 18	Buffalo	6–1	Philadelphia		Hutton	0	1–2–0	2
4	January 19	Buffalo	0–3	Philadelphia		Hutton	0	1–3–0	2
5	January 22	Buffalo	3–4	Washington	SO	Ullmark	0	1–3–1	3
6	January 24	Buffalo	4–3	Washington	SO	Ullmark	0	2–3–1	5
7	January 26	NY Rangers	2–3	Buffalo		Ullmark	0	3–3–1	7
8	January 28	NY Rangers	3–2	Buffalo	OT	Ullmark	0	3–3–2	8
9	January 30	New Jersey	3–4	Buffalo	SO	Ullmark	0	4–3–2	10
10	January 31	New Jersey	5–3	Buffalo		Hutton	0	4–4–2	10

February: 2–6–1 (Home: 1–4–1; Road: 1–2–0)
#	Date	Visitor	Score	Home	OT	Decision	Attendance	Record	Pts	Recap
—	February 2	Buffalo	–	NY Islanders	Postponed due to COVID protocol. Rescheduled for February 22.
—	February 4	Buffalo	–	NY Islanders	Postponed due to COVID protocol. Rescheduled for March 4.
—	February 6	Buffalo	–	Boston	Postponed due to COVID protocol. Rescheduled for March 27.
—	February 8	Buffalo	–	Boston	Postponed due to COVID protocol. Rescheduled for April 13.
—	February 11	Washington	–	Buffalo	Postponed due to COVID protocol. Rescheduled for March 15.
—	February 13	Washington	–	Buffalo	Postponed due to COVID protocol. Rescheduled for April 9.
11	February 15	NY Islanders	3–1	Buffalo		Ullmark	0	4–5–2	10
12	February 16	NY Islanders	3–0	Buffalo		Hutton	0	4–6–2	10
13	February 18	Buffalo	1–3	Washington		Ullmark	0	4–7–2	10
14	February 20	Buffalo	3–2	New Jersey		Ullmark	0	5–7–2	12
15	February 22	Buffalo	2–3	NY Islanders		Ullmark	0	5–8–2	12
16	February 23	Buffalo	4–1	New Jersey		Ullmark	0	6–8–2	14
17	February 25	New Jersey	4–3	Buffalo	OT	Hutton	0	6–8–3	15
18	February 27	Philadelphia	3–0	Buffalo		Hutton	0	6–9–3	15
19	February 28	Philadelphia	3–0	Buffalo		Johansson	0	6–10–3	15

March: 1–13–2 (Home: 1–4–1; Road: 0–9–1)
#	Date	Visitor	Score	Home	OT	Decision	Attendance	Record	Pts	Recap
20	March 2	Buffalo	2–3	NY Rangers		Hutton	1,800	6–11–3	15
21	March 4	Buffalo	2–5	NY Islanders		Johansson	0	6–12–3	15
22	March 6	Buffalo	2–5	NY Islanders		Hutton	0	6–13–3	15
23	March 7	Buffalo	2–5	NY Islanders		Johansson	0	6–14–3	15
24	March 9	Buffalo	4–5	Philadelphia	SO	Johansson	2,838	6–14–4	16
25	March 11	Pittsburgh	5–2	Buffalo		Johansson	0	6–15–4	16
26	March 13	Pittsburgh	3–0	Buffalo		Hutton	0	6–16–4	16
27	March 15	Washington	6–0	Buffalo		Hutton	0	6–17–4	16
28	March 16	Buffalo	2–3	New Jersey		Johansson	1,800	6–18–4	16
29	March 18	Boston	4–1	Buffalo		Hutton	0	6–19–4	16
—	March 20	Boston	–	Buffalo		Postponed due to COVID protocol. Rescheduled for April 20.
30	March 22	Buffalo	3–5	NY Rangers		Tokarski	1,800	6–20–4	16
31	March 24	Buffalo	2–5	Pittsburgh		Tokarski	2,800	6–21–4	16
32	March 25	Buffalo	0–4	Pittsburgh		Tokarski	2,800	6–22–4	16
33	March 27	Buffalo	2–3	Boston		Ullmark	2,191	6–23–4	16
34	March 29	Philadelphia	4–3	Buffalo	OT	Ullmark	0	6–23–5	17
35	March 31	Philadelphia	1–6	Buffalo		Ullmark	0	7–23–5	19

April: 6–8–2 (Home: 3–5–1; Road: 3–3–1)
#	Date	Visitor	Score	Home	OT	Decision	Attendance	Record	Pts	Recap
36	April 1	NY Rangers	3–2	Buffalo	OT	Tokarski	0	7–23–6	20
37	April 3	NY Rangers	2–3	Buffalo	SO	Ullmark	302	8–23–6	22
38	April 6	Buffalo	5–3	New Jersey		Ullmark	3,600	9–23–6	24
39	April 8	New Jersey	6–3	Buffalo		Ullmark	0	9–24–6	24
40	April 9	Washington	4–3	Buffalo		Tokarski	— (Note: Spectators were in attendance, but the exact number was not reported.)	9–25–6	24
41	April 11	Buffalo	5–3	Philadelphia		Ullmark	3,250	10–25–6	26
42	April 13	Buffalo	2–3	Boston	SO	Tokarski	2,191	10–25–7	27
43	April 15	Buffalo	5–2	Washington		Tokarski	0	11–25–7	29
44	April 17	Pittsburgh	3–2	Buffalo		Tokarski	—	11–26–7	29
45	April 18	Pittsburgh	2–4	Buffalo		Tokarski	0	12–26–7	31
46	April 20	Boston	2–0	Buffalo		Tokarski	0	12–27–7	31
47	April 22	Boston	5–1	Buffalo		Tokarski	0	12–28–7	31
48	April 23	Boston	4–6	Buffalo		Luukkonen	—	13–28–7	33
49	April 25	Buffalo	3–6	NY Rangers		Tokarski	1,800	13–29–7	33
50	April 27	Buffalo	1–3	NY Rangers		Luukkonen	1,796	13–30–7	33
51	April 29	Buffalo	2–5	Boston		Luukkonen	2,191	13–31–7	33

May: 2–3–0 (Home: 2–0–0; Road: 0–3–0)
#	Date	Visitor	Score	Home	OT	Decision	Attendance	Record	Pts	Recap
52	May 1	Buffalo	2–6	Boston		Luukkonen	2,191	13–32–7	33
53	May 3	NY Islanders	2–4	Buffalo		Houser	0	14–32–7	35
54	May 4	NY Islanders	3–4	Buffalo	SO	Houser	0	15–32–7	37
55	May 6	Buffalo	4–8	Pittsburgh		Houser	4,672	15–33–7	37
56	May 8	Buffalo	0–1	Pittsburgh		Houser	4,672	15–34–7	37

Legend: Win (2 points) Loss (0 points) Overtime/shootout loss (1 point) Postponement

== Player statistics ==
=== Skaters ===
Regular season
Player	GP	G	A	Pts	+/−	PIM
Sam Reinhart	54	25	15	40	−28	10
Victor Olofsson	56	13	19	32	−23	6
Rasmus Dahlin	56	5	18	23	−36	26
Casey Mittelstadt	41	10	12	22	−10	10
Taylor Hall^{‡}	37	2	17	19	−21	24
Rasmus Ristolainen	49	4	14	18	−18	36
Jack Eichel	21	2	16	18	−9	6
Tage Thompson	38	8	6	14	−6	17
Jeff Skinner	53	7	7	14	−11	14
Brandon Montour^{‡}	38	5	9	14	−13	24
Riley Sheahan	53	4	9	13	−8	8
Dylan Cozens	41	4	9	13	−15	16
Kyle Okposo	35	2	11	13	−1	0
Colin Miller	48	4	8	12	−20	27
Rasmus Asplund	28	7	4	11	+1	0
Eric Staal^{‡}	32	3	7	10	−20	8
Curtis Lazar^{‡}	33	5	4	9	−4	0
Jacob Bryson	38	1	8	9	−1	12
Henri Jokiharju	46	3	5	8	−11	4
Tobias Rieder	44	5	2	7	−9	2
Cody Eakin	46	3	4	7	−9	14
Arttu Ruotsalainen	17	5	1	6	−9	8
Anders Bjork^{†}	15	3	3	6	−5	4
Drake Caggiula^{†}	11	2	1	3	−5	4
Jake McCabe	13	1	2	3	+2	9
Steven Fogarty	9	1	2	3	+2	8
Mattias Samuelsson	12	0	2	2	−8	4
Matt Irwin	24	0	2	2	−10	19
Will Borgen	10	0	0	0	−4	4
Brandon Davidson	6	0	0	0	−4	4
C. J. Smith	1	0	0	0	0	0
Jean-Sebastien Dea	1	0	0	0	−1	2
Brett Murray	2	0	0	0	+1	0

=== Goaltenders ===
Regular season
Player	GP	GS	TOI	W	L	OT	GA	GAA	SA	SV%	SO	G	A	PIM
Linus Ullmark	20	20	1,117:05	9	6	3	49	2.63	591	.917	0	0	0	0
Dustin Tokarski	13	10	729:26	2	8	2	43	3.54	447	.904	0	0	1	0
Michael Houser	4	4	243:02	2	2	0	14	3.46	141	.901	0	0	0	0
Ukko-Pekka Luukkonen	4	4	216:42	1	3	0	14	3.88	149	.906	0	0	0	0
Carter Hutton	13	12	674:43	1	10	1	39	3.47	341	.886	0	0	0	0
Jonas Johansson^{‡}	7	6	379:53	0	5	1	24	3.79	207	.884	0	0	0	0

^{†}Denotes player spent time with another team before joining the Sabres. Stats reflect time with the Sabres only.
^{‡}Denotes player was traded mid-season. Stats reflect time with the Sabres only.
Bold/italics denotes franchise record.

== Transactions ==
=== Trades ===
Date	Details		Ref
September 16, 2020	To Minnesota Wild Marcus Johansson	To Buffalo Sabres Eric Staal	
October 7, 2020	To San Jose Sharks 2nd-round pick in 2020; 4th-round pick in 2020	To Buffalo Sabres 2nd-round pick in 2020	
March 20, 2021	To Colorado Avalanche Jonas Johansson	To Buffalo Sabres 6th-round pick in 2021	
March 26, 2021	To Montreal Canadiens Eric Staal	To Buffalo Sabres 3rd-round pick in 2021; 5th-round pick in 2021	
April 10, 2021	To Florida Panthers Brandon Montour	To Buffalo Sabres 3rd-round pick in 2021	
April 12, 2021	To Boston Bruins Taylor Hall; Curtis Lazar	To Buffalo Sabres Anders Bjork; 2nd-round pick in 2021	

=== Waivers ===
Date	Player	Team	Ref
April 9, 2021	Drake Caggiula	from Arizona Coyotes	

== Draft picks ==
Below are the Buffalo Sabres' selections at the 2020 NHL entry draft, which was originally scheduled for June 26–27, 2020 at the Bell Center in Montreal, but was postponed on March 25, 2020, due to the COVID-19 pandemic. It was held October 6–7, 2020 virtually via Video conference call from the NHL Network studio in Secaucus, New Jersey.

Round	#	Player	Pos	Nationality	College/Junior/Club team (League)
1	8	Jack Quinn	RW	Canada	Ottawa 67s (OHL)
2	34^{1}	John-Jason Peterka	LW	Germany	EHC Red Bull Munchen (DEL)
5	131	Matteo Costantini	C	Canada	Buffalo Jr. Sabres (OJHL)
7	193	Albert Lyckasen	D	Sweden	Vita Hasten (HockeyAllsvenskan)
7	216^{2}	Jakub Konečný	C	Czech Republic	Sparta Jr. (U20 Extraliga)

Notes:

1. The San Jose Sharks' second-round pick went to the Buffalo Sabres as the result of a trade on October 7, 2020, that sent a second and fourth-round pick both in 2020 (38th and 100th overall) to San Jose in exchange for this pick.
2. The Dallas Stars' seventh-round pick went to the Buffalo Sabres as the result of a trade on November 10, 2018, that sent Taylor Fedun to Dallas in exchange for this pick (being conditional at the time of the trade). The condition – Buffalo will receive a seventh-round pick in 2020 if Fedun plays in 25 games during the 2018–19 NHL season and 2019 Stanley Cup playoffs combined – was converted on January 17, 2019.
