= 2020–21 Philadelphia Flyers season =

NHL hockey team season

2020–21 Philadelphia Flyers
- Division: 6th East
- 2020–21 record: 25–23–8
- Home record: 12–12–4
- Road record: 13–11–4
- Goals for: 163
- Goals against: 201

Team information
- General manager: Chuck Fletcher
- Coach: Alain Vigneault
- Captain: Claude Giroux
- Alternate captains: Sean Couturier; Kevin Hayes; Ivan Provorov; Jakub Voracek
- Arena: Wells Fargo Center
- Minor league affiliates: Lehigh Valley Phantoms (AHL); Reading Royals (ECHL)

Team leaders
- Goals: Joel Farabee (20)
- Assists: Jakub Voracek (34)
- Points: Claude Giroux (43); James van Riemsdyk (43); Jakub Voracek (43)
- Penalty minutes: Nicolas Aube-Kubel (44)
- Plus/minus: Scott Laughton (+13)
- Wins: Brian Elliott (15)
- Goals against average: Brian Elliott (3.06)

The 2020–21 Philadelphia Flyers season was the 54th season for the National Hockey League (NHL) franchise that was established on June 5, 1967. This was also the second season with head coach Alain Vigneault. On December 20, 2020, the league temporarily realigned into four divisions with no conferences due to the COVID-19 pandemic and the ongoing closure of the Canada–United States border. As a result of this realignment, the Flyers played this season in the East Division and played against only the other teams in their new division during the regular season.

On April 29, 2021, the Flyers were eliminated from playoff contention following a 5–3 loss to the New Jersey Devils.

== Standings ==
=== Divisional standings ===
East Division
Pos	Team	GP	W	L	OTL	RW	GF	GA	GD	Pts
1	y – Pittsburgh Penguins	56	37	16	3	29	196	156	+40	77
2	x – Washington Capitals	56	36	15	5	29	191	163	+28	77
3	x – Boston Bruins	56	33	16	7	25	168	136	+32	73
4	x – New York Islanders	56	32	17	7	24	156	128	+28	71
5	New York Rangers	56	27	23	6	24	177	157	+20	60
6	Philadelphia Flyers	56	25	23	8	17	163	201	−38	58
7	New Jersey Devils	56	19	30	7	15	145	194	−49	45
8	Buffalo Sabres	56	15	34	7	11	138	199	−61	37

Source: National Hockey League
Rules for classification: 1) Fewer number of games played (GP, only during regular season); 2) Greater number of regulation wins (RW); 3) Greater number of wins in regulation and overtime, excluding shootout wins (ROW); 4) Greater number of total wins, including shootouts (W); 5) Greater number of points earned in head-to-head play; if teams played an uneven number of head-to-head games, the result of the first game on the home ice of the team with the extra home game is discarded; 6) Greater goal differential (GD); 7) Greater number of goals scored (GF)
x – Clinched playoff spot; y – Clinched division

== Schedule and results ==
=== Regular season ===
The regular season schedule was published on December 23, 2020.

2020–21 regular season
January: 7–2–1 (home: 5–1–0; road: 2–1–1)

Game	Date	Visitor	Score	Home	OT	Decision	Attendance	Record	Points	Recap
1	January 13	Pittsburgh	3–6	Philadelphia		Hart	0	1–0–0	2	W
2	January 15	Pittsburgh	2–5	Philadelphia		Hart	0	2–0–0	4	W
3	January 18	Buffalo	6–1	Philadelphia		Hart	0	2–1–0	4	L
4	January 19	Buffalo	0–3	Philadelphia		Elliott	0	3–1–0	6	W
5	January 21	Philadelphia	4–5	Boston	SO	Hart	0	3–1–1	7	OTL
6	January 23	Philadelphia	1–6	Boston		Hart	0	3–2–1	7	L
7	January 26	Philadelphia	5–3	New Jersey		Elliott	0	4–2–1	9	W
8	January 28	Philadelphia	3–1	New Jersey		Hart	0	5–2–1	11	W
9	January 30	NY Islanders	2–3	Philadelphia	OT	Hart	0	6–2–1	13	W
10	January 31	NY Islanders	3–4	Philadelphia	OT	Elliott	0	7–2–1	15	W

February: 4–2–2 (home: 1–1–2; road: 3–1–0)

Game	Date	Visitor	Score	Home	OT	Decision	Attendance	Record	Points	Recap
11	February 3	Boston	4–3	Philadelphia	OT	Hart	0	7–2–2	16	OTL
12	February 5	Boston	2–1	Philadelphia		Elliott	0	7–3–2	16	L
13	February 7	Philadelphia	7–4	Washington		Hart	0	8–3–2	18	W
—	February 9	Philadelphia	–	Washington	Postponed due to COVID-19. Rescheduled for April 13.					
—	February 11	New Jersey	–	Philadelphia	Postponed due to COVID-19. Rescheduled for April 25.					
—	February 13	New Jersey	–	Philadelphia	Postponed due to COVID-19. Rescheduled for May 10.					
—	February 14	Philadelphia	–	NY Rangers	Postponed due to COVID-19. Rescheduled for April 22.					
14	February 18	NY Rangers	3–2	Philadelphia	SO	Hart	0	8–3–3	19	OTL
15	February 21	Philadelphia	3–7	Boston		Hart	0 (outdoors)	8–4–3	19	L
16	February 24	NY Rangers	3–4	Philadelphia		Elliott	0	9–4–3	21	W
17	February 27	Philadelphia	3–0	Buffalo		Elliott	0	10–4–3	23	W
18	February 28	Philadelphia	3–0	Buffalo		Hart	0	11–4–3	25	W

March: 6–10–1 (home: 2–5–1; road: 4–5–0)

Game	Date	Visitor	Score	Home	OT	Decision	Attendance	Record	Points	Recap
19	March 2	Philadelphia	2–5	Pittsburgh		Hart	2,800	11–5–3	25	L
20	March 4	Philadelphia	4–3	Pittsburgh		Elliott	2,800	12–5–3	27	W
21	March 6	Philadelphia	3–4	Pittsburgh		Elliott	2,800	12–6–3	27	L
22	March 7	Washington	3–1	Philadelphia		Hart	3,023	12–7–3	27	L
23	March 9	Buffalo	4–5	Philadelphia	SO	Elliott	2,838	13–7–3	29	W
24	March 11	Washington	5–3	Philadelphia		Elliott	2,807	13–8–3	29	L
25	March 13	Washington	5–4	Philadelphia		Hart	3,083	13–9–3	29	L
26	March 15	Philadelphia	5–4	NY Rangers	OT	Hart	1,639	14–9–3	31	W
27	March 17	Philadelphia	0–9	NY Rangers		Elliott	1,723	14–10–3	31	L
28	March 18	Philadelphia	4–3	NY Islanders		Hart	1,400	15–10–3	33	W
29	March 20	Philadelphia	1–6	NY Islanders		Hart	1,400	15–11–3	33	L
30	March 22	NY Islanders	2–1	Philadelphia	OT	Elliott	2,820	15–11–4	34	OTL
31	March 23	New Jersey	4–3	Philadelphia		Hart	2,882	15–12–4	34	L
32	March 25	NY Rangers	8–3	Philadelphia		Hart	2,854	15–13–4	34	L
33	March 27	NY Rangers	1–2	Philadelphia		Elliott	3,069	16–13–4	36	W
34	March 29	Philadelphia	4–3	Buffalo	OT	Elliott	0	17–13–4	38	W
35	March 31	Philadelphia	1–6	Buffalo		Elliott	0	17–14–4	38	L

April: 5–7–3 (home: 2–3–1; road: 3–4–2)

Game	Date	Visitor	Score	Home	OT	Decision	Attendance	Record	Points	Recap
36	April 3	Philadelphia	2–3	NY Islanders	SO	Hart	1,400	17–14–5	39	OTL
37	April 5	Philadelphia	3–2	Boston	OT	Elliott	2,191	18–14–5	41	W
38	April 6	Boston	4–2	Philadelphia		Hart	2,638	18–15–5	41	L
39	April 8	Philadelphia	2–3	NY Islanders	SO	Hart	1,400	18–15–6	42	OTL
40	April 10	Boston	2–3	Philadelphia		Elliott	3,025	19–15–6	44	W
41	April 11	Buffalo	5–3	Philadelphia		Hart	3,250	19–16–6	44	L
42	April 13	Philadelphia	1–6	Washington		Elliott	0	19–17–6	44	L
43	April 15	Philadelphia	2–1	Pittsburgh	SO	Hart	4,672	20–17–6	46	W
44	April 17	Washington	6–3	Philadelphia		Lyon	3,430	20–18–6	46	L
45	April 18	NY Islanders	1–0	Philadelphia	OT	Elliott	3,603	20–18–7	47	OTL
46	April 22	Philadelphia	3–2	NY Rangers		Elliott	1,800	21–18–7	49	W
47	April 23	Philadelphia	1–4	NY Rangers		Lyon	1,800	21–19–7	49	L
48	April 25	New Jersey	3–4	Philadelphia	SO	Elliott	3,651	22–19–7	51	W
49	April 27	Philadelphia	4–6	New Jersey		Elliott	3,600	22–20–7	51	L
50	April 29	Philadelphia	3–5	New Jersey		Lyon	3,600	22–21–7	51	L

May: 3–2–1 (home: 2–2–0; road: 1–0–1)

Game	Date	Visitor	Score	Home	OT	Decision	Attendance	Record	Points	Recap
51	May 1	New Jersey	4–1	Philadelphia		Elliott	2,683	22–22–7	51	L
52	May 3	Pittsburgh	2–7	Philadelphia		Lyon	2,542	23–22–7	53	W
53	May 4	Pittsburgh	7–3	Philadelphia		Elliott	2,961	23–23–7	53	L
54	May 7	Philadelphia	4–2	Washington		Elliott	2,133	24–23–7	55	W
55	May 8	Philadelphia	1–2	Washington	OT	Lyon	2,133	24–23–8	56	OTL
56	May 10	New Jersey	2–4	Philadelphia		Elliott	3,882	25–23–8	58	W

Legend: W Win (2 points) L Loss (0 points) OTL Overtime/shootout loss (1 point) Postponement

== Player statistics ==
=== Skaters ===
Regular season
Player	GP	G	A	Pts	+/−	PIM
James van Riemsdyk	56	17	26	43	2	14
Claude Giroux	54	16	27	43	−4	12
Jakub Voracek	53	9	34	43	−12	18
Sean Couturier	45	18	23	41	−4	8
Joel Farabee	55	20	18	38	0	28
Travis Konecny	50	11	23	34	−5	26
Kevin Hayes	55	12	19	31	−2	22
Ivan Provorov	56	7	19	26	4	28
Scott Laughton	53	9	11	20	13	39
Shayne Gostisbehere	41	9	11	20	−2	6
Travis Sanheim	55	3	12	15	−22	23
Oskar Lindblom	50	8	6	14	−9	9
Nicolas Aube-Kubel	50	3	9	12	−3	44
Philippe Myers	44	1	10	11	−10	22
Erik Gustafsson‡	24	1	9	10	−2	0
Nolan Patrick	52	4	5	9	−30	20
Michael Raffl‡	34	3	5	8	−5	26
Wade Allison	14	4	3	7	1	4
Justin Braun	53	1	5	6	0	18
Robert Hagg	34	2	3	5	−3	18
Nate Prosser	6	1	1	2	−7	0
Samuel Morin	20	1	0	1	−7	37
Connor Bunnaman	18	0	1	1	−6	2
Jackson Cates	4	0	1	1	−3	0
Andy Andreoff	6	0	0	0	−6	9
Mark Friedman‡	4	0	0	0	−2	4
David Kase	1	0	0	0	0	0
Carsen Twarynski	7	0	0	0	−3	2
Tanner Laczynski	5	0	0	0	1	0
Morgan Frost	2	0	0	0	0	0
Maxim Sushko	2	0	0	0	−1	0
Egor Zamula	2	0	0	0	1	0
Cam York	3	0	0	0	−1	0

=== Goaltenders ===
Regular season
Player	GP	GS	TOI	W	L	OT	GA	GAA	SA	SV%	SO	G	A	PIM
Brian Elliott	30	26	1,607:43	15	9	2	82	3.06	738	.889	2	0	1	0
Carter Hart	27	25	1,456:19	9	11	5	89	3.67	721	.877	1	0	0	2
Alex Lyon	6	5	324:09	1	3	1	18	3.33	169	.893	0	0	0	0

^{†}Denotes player spent time with another team before joining the Flyers. Stats reflect time with the Flyers only.
^{‡}Denotes player was traded mid-season. Stats reflect time with the Flyers only.
Bold/italics denotes franchise record.

== Awards and records ==
=== Awards ===
Type	Award/honor	Recipient	Ref
League (annual)	Bill Masterton Memorial Trophy	Oskar Lindblom	
League (in-season)	NHL East Star of the Month	James van Riemsdyk (January)	
League (in-season)	NHL Second Star of the Week	Travis Konecny (January 18)	
Team	Barry Ashbee Trophy	Ivan Provorov	
Team	Bobby Clarke Trophy	Sean Couturier	
Team	Gene Hart Memorial Award	Sean Couturier	
Team	Pelle Lindbergh Memorial Trophy	Joel Farabee	
Team	Toyota Cup	Claude Giroux	
Team	Yanick Dupre Memorial Class Guy Award	James van Riemsdyk	

=== Records ===
Among the team records set during the 2020–21 season was the Flyers giving up seven goals during the second period against the New York Rangers on March 17.

=== Milestones ===
Milestone	Player	Date	Ref
First game	Maxim Sushko	February 18, 2021	
First game	Tanner Laczynski	April 3, 2021	
First game	Wade Allison	April 15, 2021	
First game	Jackson Cates	April 23, 2021	
First game	Egor Zamula	April 27, 2021	
First game	Cam York	May 7, 2021	

== Transactions ==
The Flyers were involved in the following transactions during the 2020–21 season.

=== Trades ===
Date	Details		Ref
October 7, 2020	To Tampa Bay Lightning 4th-round pick in 2020 (116th overall); 5th-round pick in 2020 (147th overall)	To Philadelphia Flyers DET 4th-round pick in 2020 (94th overall)	
October 7, 2020	To Nashville Predators MTL 7th-round pick in 2020 (202nd overall); 7th-round pick in 2020 (209th overall)	To Philadelphia Flyers 5th-round pick in 2020 (135th overall)	
April 12, 2021	To Montreal Canadiens Erik Gustafsson (Note: The Flyers retained 50% of Gustafsson's remaining salary.)	To Philadelphia Flyers STL 7th-round pick in 2022	
April 12, 2021	To Washington Capitals Michael Raffl (Note: The Flyers retained 25% of Raffl's remaining salary.)	To Philadelphia Flyers VGK 5th-round pick in 2021	

=== Players acquired ===
Date	Player	Former team	Term	Via	Ref
October 10, 2020	Derrick Pouliot	St. Louis Blues	1-year	Free agency	
October 12, 2020	Erik Gustafsson	Calgary Flames	1-year	Free agency	
March 24, 2021	Max Willman	Lehigh Valley Phantoms (AHL)	2-year	Free agency	
April 13, 2021	Jackson Cates	University of Minnesota-Duluth (NCHC)	2-year	Free agency	

=== Players lost ===
Date	Player	New team	Term	Via	Ref
October 9, 2020	Derek Grant	Anaheim Ducks	3-year	Free agency	
October 9, 2020	Nathan Noel (Note: Noel was inactive during the 2020–21 season.)			Contract expiration	
October 9, 2020	Tyler Pitlick	Arizona Coyotes	2-year	Free agency	
October 10, 2020	Nate Thompson	Winnipeg Jets	1-year	Free agency	
October 10, 2020	Andy Welinski	Anaheim Ducks	1-year	Free agency	
November 2, 2020	Kurtis Gabriel	San Jose Sharks	1-year	Free agency	
January 5, 2021	Reece Willcox	Florida Everblades (ECHL)	1-year	Free agency	
February 24, 2021	Mark Friedman	Pittsburgh Penguins		Waivers	
May 25, 2021	David Kase	HC Sparta Praha (ELH)	2-year	Free agency	

=== Signings ===
Date	Player	Term	Contract type	Ref
October 12, 2020	Zayde Wisdom	3-year	Entry-level	
October 14, 2020	Tyson Foerster	3-year	Entry-level	
October 16, 2020	Nolan Patrick	1-year	Re-signing	
December 8, 2020	Philippe Myers	3-year	Extension	
December 18, 2020	Mason Millman	3-year	Entry-level	
March 31, 2021	Cam York	3-year	Entry-level	
April 12, 2021	Scott Laughton	5-year	Extension	
May 5, 2021	Elliot Desnoyers	3-year	Entry-level	
May 5, 2021	Olle Lycksell	2-year	Entry-level	
June 3, 2021	Samuel Ersson	3-year	Entry-level	
June 8, 2021	Felix Sandstrom	1-year	Extension	
June 14, 2021	German Rubtsov	1-year	Extension	
June 14, 2021	Linus Sandin	1-year	Extension	

== Draft picks ==
Below are the Philadelphia Flyers' selections at the 2020 NHL entry draft, which was originally scheduled for June 26–27, 2020 at the Bell Center in Montreal, Quebec, but was postponed on March 25, 2020, due to the COVID-19 pandemic. It was held October 6–7, 2020 virtually via Video conference call from the NHL Network studio in Secaucus, New Jersey.

Round	Pick	Player	Position	Nationality	Team (league)	Notes
1	23	Tyson Foerster	RW	Canada	Barrie Colts (OHL)	
2	54	Emil Andrae	D	Sweden	HV71 J20 (J20 SuperElit)	
4	94	Zayde Wisdom	RW	Canada	Kingston Frontenacs (OHL)	
5	135	Elliot Desnoyers	LW	Canada	Halifax Mooseheads (QMJHL)	
6	178	Connor McClennon	RW	Canada	Winnipeg Ice (WHL)	
