= 2020–21 New Jersey Devils season =

National Hockey League season

2020–21 New Jersey Devils
- Division: 7th East
- 2020–21 record: 19–30–7
- Home record: 7–18–3
- Road record: 12–12–4
- Goals for: 145
- Goals against: 194

Team information
- General manager: Tom Fitzgerald
- Coach: Lindy Ruff
- Captain: Vacant (Jan. 14 – Feb. 20); Nico Hischier (Feb. 20 – May 10)
- Alternate captains: Nico Hischier (Jan. 14 – Feb. 20); Kyle Palmieri (Jan. 14 – Apr. 7); Damon Severson; P. K. Subban (Apr. 8 – May 10); Travis Zajac (Jan. 14 – Apr. 7); Miles Wood (Apr. 8 – May 10)
- Arena: Prudential Center
- Minor league affiliates: Binghamton Devils (AHL); Adirondack Thunder (ECHL)

Team leaders
- Goals: Miles Wood; Pavel Zacha (17)
- Assists: Jesper Bratt (23)
- Points: Pavel Zacha (35)
- Penalty minutes: Michael McLeod (42)
- Plus/minus: Jesper Bratt (+4)
- Wins: Mackenzie Blackwood (14)
- Goals against average: Eric Comrie (3.00)

The 2020–21 New Jersey Devils season was the 47th season for the National Hockey League (NHL) franchise that was established on June 11, 1974, and 39th season since the franchise relocated from Colorado prior to the 1982–83 NHL season. Due to the COVID-19 pandemic and COVID-19 cross-border travel restrictions imposed by the Government of Canada, the Devils played a shortened 56-game regular season, which consisted of divisional play only, with the Devils being temporarily realigned from the Metropolitan Division to the East Division.

Fan attendance in home games was prohibited until March 1, 2021, per an executive order from Governor of New Jersey Phil Murphy. The Devils reopened Prudential Center to spectators on March 2.

On April 20, following a 7–6 loss to the Pittsburgh Penguins, the Devils were eliminated from playoff contention for the third consecutive season.

== Standings ==
=== Divisional standings ===
East Division
Pos	Team	GP	W	L	OTL	RW	GF	GA	GD	Pts
1	y – Pittsburgh Penguins	56	37	16	3	29	196	156	+40	77
2	x – Washington Capitals	56	36	15	5	29	191	163	+28	77
3	x – Boston Bruins	56	33	16	7	25	168	136	+32	73
4	x – New York Islanders	56	32	17	7	24	156	128	+28	71
5	New York Rangers	56	27	23	6	24	177	157	+20	60
6	Philadelphia Flyers	56	25	23	8	17	163	201	−38	58
7	New Jersey Devils	56	19	30	7	15	145	194	−49	45
8	Buffalo Sabres	56	15	34	7	11	138	199	−61	37

Source: National Hockey League
Rules for classification: 1) Fewer number of games played (GP, only during regular season); 2) Greater number of regulation wins (RW); 3) Greater number of wins in regulation and overtime, excluding shootout wins (ROW); 4) Greater number of total wins, including shootouts (W); 5) Greater number of points earned in head-to-head play; if teams played an uneven number of head-to-head games, the result of the first game on the home ice of the team with the extra home game is discarded; 6) Greater goal differential (GD); 7) Greater number of goals scored (GF)
x – Clinched playoff spot; y – Clinched division

== Schedule and results ==
=== Regular season ===
The regular season schedule was published on December 23, 2020.

2020–21 game log

January: 4–3–2 (Home: 2–2–1; Road: 2–1–1)
#	Date	Visitor	Score	Home	OT	Decision	Attendance	Record	Pts	Recap
1	January 14	Boston	3–2	New Jersey	SO	Blackwood	0	0–0–1	1
2	January 16	Boston	1–2	New Jersey	OT	Blackwood	0	1–0–1	3
3	January 19	New Jersey	4–3	NY Rangers		Blackwood	0	2–0–1	5
4	January 21	New Jersey	1–4	NY Islanders		Wedgewood	0	2–1–1	5
5	January 24	NY Islanders	0–2	New Jersey		Wedgewood	0	3–1–1	7
6	January 26	Philadelphia	5–3	New Jersey		Wedgewood	0	3–2–1	7
7	January 28	Philadelphia	3–1	New Jersey		Wedgewood	0	3–3–1	7
8	January 30	New Jersey	3–4	Buffalo	SO	Wedgewood	0	3–3–2	8
9	January 31	New Jersey	5–3	Buffalo		Comrie	0	4–3–2	10

February: 3–5–0 (Home: 0–4–0; Road: 3–1–0)
#	Date	Visitor	Score	Home	OT	Decision	Attendance	Record	Pts	Recap
—	February 2	New Jersey	–	Pittsburgh	Postponed due to COVID-19 protocol; moved to March 21
—	February 4	New Jersey	–	Pittsburgh	Postponed due to COVID-19 protocol; moved to April 20
—	February 6	NY Rangers	–	New Jersey	Postponed due to COVID-19 protocol; moved to March 4
—	February 9	Pittsburgh	–	New Jersey	Postponed due to COVID-19 protocol; moved to March 18
—	February 11	New Jersey	–	Philadelphia	Postponed due to COVID-19 protocol; moved to April 25
—	February 13	New Jersey	–	Philadelphia	Postponed due to COVID-19 protocol; moved to May 10
—	February 15	New Jersey	–	Boston	Postponed due to COVID-19 protocol; moved to March 7
10	February 16	New Jersey	5–2	NY Rangers		Blackwood	0	5–3–2	12
11	February 18	New Jersey	3–2	Boston		Blackwood	0	6–3–2	14
12	February 20	Buffalo	3–2	New Jersey		Blackwood	0	6–4–2	14
13	February 21	New Jersey	3–4	Washington		Dell	0	6–5–2	14
14	February 23	Buffalo	4–1	New Jersey		Blackwood	0	6–6–2	14
15	February 25	New Jersey	4–3	Buffalo	OT	Blackwood	0	7–6–2	16
16	February 27	Washington	5–2	New Jersey		Blackwood	0	7–7–2	16
17	February 28	Washington	3–2	New Jersey		Blackwood	0	7–8–2	16

March: 6–8–3 (Home: 2–5–1; Road: 4–3–2)
#	Date	Visitor	Score	Home	OT	Decision	Attendance	Record	Pts	Recap
18	March 2	NY Islanders	2–1	New Jersey		Dell	1,800	7–9–2	16
19	March 4	NY Rangers	6–1	New Jersey		Blackwood	1,800	7–10–2	16
20	March 6	NY Rangers	6–3	New Jersey		Blackwood	1,800	7–11–2	16
21	March 7	New Jersey	1–0	Boston		Wedgewood	0	8–11–2	18
22	March 9	New Jersey	4–5	Washington	OT	Wedgewood	0	8–11–3	19
23	March 11	New Jersey	3–5	NY Islanders		Blackwood	1,000	8–12–3	19
24	March 13	NY Islanders	3–2	New Jersey		Blackwood	1,800	8–13–3	19
25	March 14	NY Islanders	3–2	New Jersey	SO	Wedgewood	1,800	8–13–4	20
26	March 16	Buffalo	2–3	New Jersey		Blackwood	1,800	9–13–4	22
27	March 18	Pittsburgh	2–3	New Jersey		Wedgewood	1,800	10–13–4	24
28	March 20	Pittsburgh	3–1	New Jersey		Wedgewood	1,800	10–14–4	24
29	March 21	New Jersey	2–1	Pittsburgh	OT	Blackwood	2,800	11–14–4	26
30	March 23	New Jersey	4–3	Philadelphia		Blackwood	2,882	12–14–4	28
31	March 25	New Jersey	3–4	Washington		Blackwood	0	12–15–4	28
32	March 26	New Jersey	0–4	Washington		Wedgewood	0	12–16–4	28
33	March 28	New Jersey	1–0	Boston		Blackwood	2,191	13–16–4	30
34	March 30	New Jersey	4–5	Boston	SO	Blackwood	2,191	13–16–5	31

April: 3–11–2 (Home: 2–6–1; Road: 1–5–1)
#	Date	Visitor	Score	Home	OT	Decision	Attendance	Record	Pts	Recap
35	April 2	Washington	2–1	New Jersey	OT	Blackwood	3,600	13–16–6	32
36	April 4	Washington	5–4	New Jersey		Blackwood	3,600	13–17–6	32
37	April 6	Buffalo	5–3	New Jersey		Wedgewood	3,600	13–18–6	32
38	April 8	New Jersey	6–3	Buffalo		Dell	0	14–18–6	34
39	April 9	Pittsburgh	6–4	New Jersey		Blackwood	3,600	14–19–6	34
40	April 11	Pittsburgh	5–2	New Jersey		Blackwood	3,600	14–20–6	34
41	April 13	NY Rangers	3–0	New Jersey		Blackwood	3,600	14–21–6	34
42	April 15	New Jersey	0–4	NY Rangers		Blackwood	1,688	14–22–6	34
43	April 17	New Jersey	3–6	NY Rangers		Dell	1,800	14–23–6	34
44	April 18	NY Rangers	5–3	New Jersey		Blackwood	3,500	14–24–6	34
45	April 20	New Jersey	6–7	Pittsburgh		Dell	4,672	14–25–6	34
46	April 22	New Jersey	1–5	Pittsburgh		Dell	4,672	14–26–6	34
47	April 24	New Jersey	2–4	Pittsburgh		Blackwood	4,672	14–27–6	34
48	April 25	New Jersey	3–4	Philadelphia	SO	Blackwood	3,651	14–27–7	35
49	April 27	Philadelphia	4–6	New Jersey		Blackwood	3,600	15–27–7	37
50	April 29	Philadelphia	3–5	New Jersey		Blackwood	3,600	16–27–7	39

May: 3–3–0 (Home: 1–1–0; Road: 2–2–0)
#	Date	Visitor	Score	Home	OT	Decision	Attendance	Record	Pts	Recap
51	May 1	New Jersey	4–1	Philadelphia		Blackwood	2,683	17–27–7	41
52	May 3	Boston	3–0	New Jersey		Wedgewood	3,600	17–28–7	41
53	May 4	Boston	3–4	New Jersey	OT	Blackwood	3,600	18–28–7	43
54	May 6	New Jersey	2–1	NY Islanders		Blackwood	1,400	19–28–7	45
55	May 8	New Jersey	1–5	NY Islanders		Blackwood	— (Note: Spectators were in attendance, but the exact number was not reported.)	19–29–7	45
56	May 10	New Jersey	2–4	Philadelphia		Wedgewood	3,882	19–30–7	45

Legend: Win (2 points) Loss (0 points) Overtime/shootout loss (1 point) Postponement

== Player statistics ==
As of May 11, 2021

=== Skaters ===
Regular season
Player	GP	G	A	Pts	+/−	PIM
Pavel Zacha	50	17	18	35	–11	10
Jack Hughes	56	11	20	31	–3	16
Yegor Sharangovich	54	16	14	30	–4	4
Jesper Bratt	46	7	23	30	+4	8
Miles Wood	55	17	8	25	–6	29
Janne Kuokkanen	50	8	17	25	–1	14
Ty Smith	48	2	21	23	–9	22
Damon Severson	56	3	18	21	–8	29
P. K. Subban	44	5	14	19	–16	26
Travis Zajac^{‡}	33	7	11	18	0	6
Kyle Palmieri^{‡}	34	8	9	17	–2	18
Michael McLeod	52	9	6	15	–12	42
Ryan Murray	48	0	14	14	+3	8
Nico Hischier	21	6	5	11	−9	4
Andreas Johnsson	50	5	6	11	–1	12
Will Butcher	23	1	10	11	−3	2
Nathan Bastian	41	3	7	10	0	21
Nick Merkley	27	2	8	10	–5	7
Mikhail Maltsev	33	6	3	9	−4	4
Jesper Boqvist	28	4	3	7	−5	2
Sami Vatanen	30	2	4	6	+2	18
Nikita Gusev	20	2	3	5	–12	0
Matt Tennyson	21	1	2	3	0	2
Marián Studenič	8	1	1	2	–2	4
Nolan Foote	6	1	1	2	–1	0
Connor Carrick	11	1	1	2	–2	5
Dmitri Kulikov^{‡}	38	0	2	2	−4	26
Kevin Bahl	7	0	2	2	0	0
Tyce Thompson	7	0	1	1	–3	0
Jonas Siegenthaler^{†}	8	0	0	0	–6	2
Colton White	2	0	0	0	–1	0
A. J. Greer^{†}	1	0	0	0	0	7

=== Goaltenders ===
Regular season
Player	GP	GS	TOI	W	L	OT	GA	GAA	SA	SV%	SO	G	A	PIM
Mackenzie Blackwood	35	35	2,090:37	14	17	4	106	3.04	1,081	.902	1	0	0	0
Scott Wedgewood	16	15	888:02	3	8	3	46	3.11	458	.900	2	0	0	0
Eric Comrie	1	1	60:00	1	0	0	3	3.00	33	.909	0	0	0	0
Aaron Dell	7	5	319:10	1	5	0	22	4.14	154	.857	0	0	0	0

- ^{†} Denotes player spent time with another team before joining the Devils. Stats reflect time with the Devils only.
- ^{‡} Denotes player was traded mid-season. Stats reflect time with the Devils only.
- Bold/italics denotes franchise record.

== Transactions ==
The Devils have been involved in the following transactions during the 2020–21 season.

=== Trades ===
Date	Details		Ref
October 7, 2020	To Arizona Coyotes 7th-round pick in 2020	To New Jersey Devils 7th-round pick in 2021	
October 8, 2020	To Columbus Blue Jackets 5th-round pick in 2021	To New Jersey Devils Ryan Murray	
October 10, 2020	To Toronto Maple Leafs Joey Anderson	To New Jersey Devils Andreas Johnsson	
April 7, 2021	To New York Islanders Kyle Palmieri; Travis Zajac	To New Jersey Devils A. J. Greer; Mason Jobst; 1st-round pick in 2021; Conditional 4th-round pick in 2022	
April 11, 2021	To Washington Capitals Conditional 3rd-round pick in 2021	To New Jersey Devils Jonas Siegenthaler	
April 12, 2021	To Edmonton Oilers Dmitri Kulikov	To New Jersey Devils Conditional 4th-round pick in 2022	

=== Free agents ===
Date	Player	Team	Contract term	Ref
October 9, 2020	Brandon Baddock	to Montreal Canadiens	1-year	
October 9, 2020	Corey Crawford	from Chicago Blackhawks	2-year	
October 9, 2020	John Hayden	to Arizona Coyotes	1-year	
October 9, 2020	Dakota Mermis	to Minnesota Wild	1-year	
October 9, 2020	Kevin Rooney	to New York Rangers	2-year	
October 11, 2020	Scott Wedgewood	from Tampa Bay Lightning	1-year	
October 22, 2020	Dmitry Kulikov	from Winnipeg Jets	1-year	
October 26, 2020	Zane McIntyre	to Dinamo Riga (KHL)	1-year	
January 7, 2021	Sami Vatanen	from Carolina Hurricanes	1-year	
January 11, 2021	Fredrik Claesson	to San Jose Sharks	1-year	
February 1, 2021	Mirco Müller	to Leksands IF (SHL)	1-year	
May 27, 2021	Gilles Senn	to HC Davos (NL)	3-year	

=== Waivers ===
Date	Player	Team	Ref
January 12, 2021	Eric Comrie	from Winnipeg Jets	
January 18, 2021	Aaron Dell	from Toronto Maple Leafs	
February 18, 2021	Eric Comrie	to Winnipeg Jets	
April 12, 2021	Sami Vatanen	to Dallas Stars	

=== Contract terminations ===
Date	Player	Via	Ref
October 9, 2020	Cory Schneider	Buyout	
April 10, 2021	Nikita Gusev	Mutual termination	

=== Retirement ===
Date	Player	Ref
January 9, 2021	Corey Crawford	

=== Signings ===
Date	Player	Contract term	Ref
September 30, 2020	Josh Jacobs	1-year	
September 30, 2020	Brett Seney	1-year	
September 30, 2020	Ben Street	1-year	
October 21, 2020	Nick Merkley	1-year	
October 29, 2020	Colton White	1-year	
December 23, 2020	Mackenzie Blackwood	3-year	
December 24, 2020	Dawson Mercer	3-year	
January 10, 2021	Jesper Bratt	2-year	
March 6, 2021	Graeme Clarke	3-year	
March 19, 2021	Michael Vukojevic	3-year	
March 24, 2021	Tyce Thompson	2-year	
March 25, 2021	Aarne Talvitie	2-year	
April 19, 2021	Alexander Holtz	3-year	
May 5, 2021	Nico Daws	3-year	
May 17, 2021	Akira Schmid	3-year	
June 15, 2021	Nathan Bastian	2-year	
July 6, 2021	Scott Wedgewood	1-year	

== Draft picks ==
Below are the New Jersey Devils' selections at the 2020 NHL entry draft, which was held on October 6 and 7, 2020, in a remote format, with teams convening via videoconferencing, and Commissioner Gary Bettman announcing selections from the NHL Network studios in Secaucus, New Jersey. It was originally scheduled to be held on June 26–27, 2020, at the Bell Centre in Montreal, but was postponed on March 25, 2020, due to the COVID-19 pandemic and the conclusion of the 2020 Stanley Cup playoffs.

Round	#	Player	Pos	Nationality	College/junior/club team
1	7	Alexander Holtz	RW	Sweden	Djurgårdens IF (SHL)
1	18^{1}	Dawson Mercer	C	Canada	Chicoutimi Saguenéens (QMJHL)
1	20^{2}	Shakir Mukhamadullin	D	Russia	Salavat Yulaev Ufa (KHL)
3	84^{3}	Nico Daws	G	Canada	Guelph Storm (OHL)
4	99	Jaromír Pytlík	C	Czech Republic	Sault Ste. Marie Greyhounds (OHL)
4	120^{4}	Ethan Edwards	D	Canada	Spruce Grove Saints (AJHL)
5	130	Artem Shlaine	C	Russia	Shattuck-St. Mary's High School (Minnesota)
6	161	Benjamin Baumgartner	C	Austria	HC Davos (NL)

1. The Arizona Coyotes' first-round pick went to the New Jersey Devils as the result of a trade on December 16, 2019, that sent Taylor Hall and Blake Speers to Arizona in exchange for Nick Merkley, Kevin Bahl, Nate Schnarr, a conditional third-round pick in 2021 and this pick (being conditional at the time of the trade).
2. The Vancouver Canucks' first-round pick went to the New Jersey Devils as the result of a trade on February 16, 2020, that sent Blake Coleman to Tampa Bay in exchange for Nolan Foote and this pick (being conditional at the time of the trade).
3. The Carolina Hurricanes' third-round pick went to the New Jersey Devils as the result of a trade on February 24, 2020, that sent Sami Vatanen to Carolina in exchange for Fredrik Claesson, Janne Kuokkanen and this pick (being conditional at the time of the trade).
4. The Boston Bruins' fourth-round pick went to the New Jersey Devils as the result of a trade on February 25, 2019, that sent Marcus Johansson to Boston in exchange for a second-round pick in 2019 and this pick.
