= NHL Outdoors at Lake Tahoe =

Outdoor National Hockey League game

Coordinates: 38.968°N 119.949°W

Edgewood Tahoe Resort, Stateline
- February 20–21, 2021
- Game one: Vegas Golden Knights at Colorado Avalanche
- Game two: Philadelphia Flyers at Boston Bruins

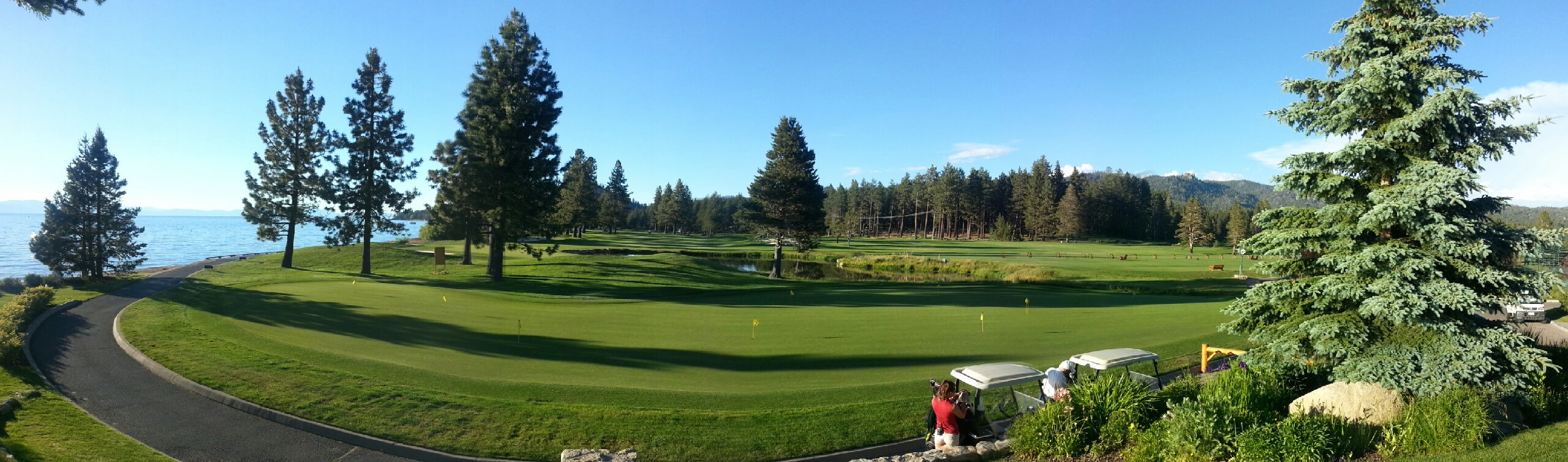
The golf course at Edgewood Tahoe Resort in July 2013.

NHL Outdoors at Lake Tahoe was a series of two outdoor regular season National Hockey League (NHL) games, held on the weekend of February 20–21, 2021. Both games were played without fans at a rink on the 18th fairway of the Edgewood Tahoe Resort in Stateline, Nevada, on the south shore of Lake Tahoe. The elevation of the rink was approximately 6,240 feet (1,900 m) above sea level.

The first game scheduled for February 20, titled Bridgestone NHL Outdoors Saturday, featured the Vegas Golden Knights and Colorado Avalanche, and the second game on the following day, titled Honda NHL Outdoors Sunday, pitted the Philadelphia Flyers against the Boston Bruins. The series was scheduled as a replacement for both the 2021 Winter Classic and Stadium Series games, which were canceled due to the COVID-19 pandemic.

== Background ==
The NHL originally scheduled the outdoor games for the 2020–21 season prior to the COVID-19 pandemic. The Winter Classic, planned for January 1, 2021, was to feature the Minnesota Wild hosting the St. Louis Blues at Target Field, and the Stadium Series game was to be hosted by the Carolina Hurricanes at Carter–Finley Stadium on February 20, against an unannounced opponent. The league announced on October 22, 2020, that the Winter Classic was being postponed to the next season due to "ongoing uncertainty" of the pandemic since fan participation is considered "integral to [its] success. The decision to further postpone the Stadium Series game was made on December 23, also because fans would likely not be able to attend.

In seeking an alternative outdoor stadium with fans not likely to be in attendance, the league focused on natural landscapes capable of mimicking pond hockey and not an in-person fan experience. The Edgewood Tahoe Resort in Stateline, Nevada, in the Lake Tahoe region, was chosen over Lake Louise, Alberta, and Park City, Utah. This is the same golf course that has hosted the American Century Championship annually since 1990. The golf course was selected because the actual Lake Tahoe does not freeze over and therefore is not suitable for ice hockey play. The average high temperature on February 20 is 44 °F (7 °C), with an average low of 18 °F (−8 °C).

With no fans allowed at the event, the geographic location of the teams became less important, as the games became made-for-television showcases. The nearest teams to Lake Tahoe are the Vegas Golden Knights and San Jose Sharks, but the Sharks were not scheduled for the event due to scheduling uncertainties related to Santa Clara County's local COVID-19 health restrictions on contact sports, as well the expectation that the team would finish with a losing record as in the prior season. The Philadelphia Flyers and the Boston Bruins were offered the opportunity to play in both games, but decided to take part in only one contest.

With the NHL's condensed 56-game regular season schedule and limited geographical travel due to the pandemic, few off-days were scheduled between games. However, allocations were made in the schedule to make travel more manageable.

On February 10, Greg Wyshynski of ESPN reported a message from NHL chief creative officer Steve Mayer, informing them that the league had backup teams in place should any of the teams scheduled for the Lake Tahoe games become unavailable due to COVID protocols.

Unlike previous NHL outdoor games in which speciality jerseys were created, all four teams participating in the games wore their “Reverse Retro” jerseys from that season’s league-wide promotion.

== February 20: Vegas vs. Colorado ==
Bridgestone NHL Outdoors Saturday
| | 1 | 2 | 3 | Total |
|---|---|---|---|---|
| Vegas Golden Knights | 0 | 1 | 1 | 2 |
| Colorado Avalanche | 1 | 1 | 1 | 3 |
- Date: February 20, 2021
- Venue: Edgewood Tahoe Resort
- City: Stateline

The Vegas Golden Knights (VGK) and the Colorado Avalanche (COL) began play on February 20 at 12:12 p.m. PT (3:12 p.m. ET). Play was suspended after the first period due to ice conditions caused by its exposure to heat and sunlight; the game was resumed at 9:02 p.m. PT (12:02 a.m. ET). The game ended at approximately 10:50 p.m. PT (1:50 a.m. ET) with Colorado winning, 3–2.

=== Game summary ===
Scoring summary
| Period | Team | Goal | Assist(s) | Time | Score |
|---|---|---|---|---|---|
| 1st | COL | Sam Girard (2) | Nathan MacKinnon (13), Mikko Rantanen (5) | 2:58 | COL 1–0 |
| 2nd | VGK | Alec Martinez (1) | Alex Pietrangelo (4), Reilly Smith (4) | 7:37 | TIED 1–1 |
| 2nd | COL | Nathan MacKinnon (4) | Devon Toews (3) | 11:18 | COL 2–1 |
| 3rd | COL | Devon Toews (4) | Nathan MacKinnon (14), Mikko Rantanen (6) | 13:11 | COL 3–1 |
| 3rd | VGK | Alex Tuch (5) | Zach Whitecloud (3) | 14:25 | COL 3–2 |

Number in parentheses represents the player's total in goals or assists to that point of the season

Penalty summary
| Period | Team | Player | Penalty | Time | PIM |
|---|---|---|---|---|---|
| 1st | VGK | Mark Stone | High sticking | 16:03 | 4:00 |
| 1st | VGK | served by Keegan Kolesar | Too many men on the ice | 18:40 | 2:00 |
| 2nd | VGK | William Carrier | Delay of game | 3:18 | 2:00 |
| 2nd | VGK | Chandler Stephenson | Cross-checking | 10:44 | 2:00 |
| 2nd | COL | Tyson Jost | Interference | 10:44 | 2:00 |
| 2nd | COL | Joonas Donskoi | Goalkeeper interference | 16:15 | 2:00 |
| 2nd | VGK | Alex Tuch | Goalkeeper interference | 17:44 | 2:00 |
| 2nd | COL | Andre Burakovsky | High sticking | 18:09 | 2:00 |
| 3rd | COL | Nazem Kadri | Tripping | 1:59 | 2:00 |
| 3rd | COL | Cale Makar | Delay of game | 2:37 | 2:00 |

Shots by period
| Team | 1 | 2 | 3 | Total |
|---|---|---|---|---|
| VGK | 8 | 8 | 13 | 29 |
| COL | 17 | 13 | 9 | 39 |

Power play opportunities
| Team | Goals/Opportunities |
|---|---|
| Vegas | 0 / 4 |
| Colorado | 0 / 4 |

Three star selections
| | Team | Player | Statistics |
|---|---|---|---|
| 1st | COL | Nathan MacKinnon | 1 goal, 2 assists |
| 2nd | COL | Devon Toews | 1 goal, 1 assist |
| 3rd | VGK | Alex Tuch | 1 goal |

=== Team rosters ===
Vegas Golden Knights
| # | | Player | Position |
|---|---|---|---|
| 2 | (Canada) | Zach Whitecloud | D |
| 7 | (Canada) | Alex Pietrangelo† (A) | D |
| 9 | (Canada) | Cody Glass | C |
| 10 | (Canada) | Nicolas Roy | C |
| 14 | (Canada) | Nicolas Hague | D |
| 19 | (Canada) | Reilly Smith† (A) | RW |
| 20 | (Canada) | Chandler Stephenson | C |
| 22 | (Canada) | Nick Holden | D |
| 23 | (United States) | Alec Martinez† | D |
| 27 | (Canada) | Shea Theodore | D |
| 28 | (Canada) | William Carrier | LW |
| 29 | (Canada) | Marc-Andre Fleury† | G |
| 35 | (Sweden) | Oscar Dansk | G |
| 55 | (Canada) | Keegan Kolesar | RW |
| 61 | (Canada) | Mark Stone (C) | RW |
| 67 | (United States) | Max Pacioretty | LW |
| 71 | (Sweden) | William Karlsson† | C |
| 75 | (Canada) | Ryan Reaves | RW |
| 81 | (Canada) | Jonathan Marchessault† | C |
| 89 | (United States) | Alex Tuch | RW |
Head coach: (Canada) Peter DeBoer

Colorado Avalanche
| # | | Player | Position |
|---|---|---|---|
| 4 | (Canada) | Bowen Byram | D |
| 7 | (Canada) | Devon Toews† | D |
| 8 | (Canada) | Cale Makar† | D |
| 11 | (Canada) | Matt Calvert | LW |
| 13 | (Russia) | Valeri Nichushkin | RW |
| 17 | (Canada) | Tyson Jost | C |
| 20 | (United States) | Brandon Saad | LW |
| 22 | (Canada) | Conor Timmins | D |
| 27 | (Canada) | Ryan Graves | D |
| 29 | (Canada) | Nathan MacKinnon† (A) | C |
| 30 | (Sweden) | Adam Werner | G |
| 31 | (Germany) | Philipp Grubauer† | G |
| 37 | (United States) | J. T. Compher | LW |
| 41 | (France) | Pierre-Edouard Bellemare | LW |
| 49 | (Canada) | Samuel Girard | D |
| 72 | (Finland) | Joonas Donskoi | RW |
| 91 | (Canada) | Nazem Kadri | C |
| 92 | (Sweden) | Gabriel Landeskog (C) | LW |
| 95 | (Sweden) | Andre Burakovsky† | LW |
| 96 | (Finland) | Mikko Rantanen† (A) | RW |
Head coach: (Canada) Jared Bednar

Oscar Dansk and Adam Werner dressed as the back-up goaltenders. Neither entered the game.
† Starting lineup.

=== Scratches ===
- Vegas Golden Knights: Robin Lehner, Tomas Nosek
- Colorado Avalanche: Dennis Gilbert

== February 21: Philadelphia vs. Boston ==
Honda NHL Outdoors Sunday
| | 1 | 2 | 3 | Total |
|---|---|---|---|---|
| Philadelphia Flyers | 2 | 0 | 1 | 3 |
| Boston Bruins | 2 | 4 | 1 | 7 |
- Date: February 21, 2021
- Venue: Edgewood Tahoe Resort
- City: Stateline

The game between the Philadelphia Flyers (PHI) and Boston Bruins (BOS) was scheduled for February 21, originally at noon PT (3:00 p.m. ET); in the week before the game, the start time was adjusted to 11:00 a.m. local time. Due to the delay of the Saturday game, the league announced that the Sunday game would be moved later in the day, to start at 4:30 p.m. local time. The actual start time of the game was 4:59 p.m. local time, and it ended at 7:25 p.m. PT (10:25 p.m. ET) as a 7–3 win for Boston.

=== Game summary ===
Scoring summary
| Period | Team | Goal | Assist(s) | Time | Score |
|---|---|---|---|---|---|
| 1st | BOS | David Pastrnak (7) | Brad Marchand (10), Patrice Bergeron (12) | 0:34 | BOS 1–0 |
| 1st | PHI | Joel Farabee (8) | Sean Couturier (4), James van Riemsdyk (12) | 6:41 | TIED 1–1 |
| 1st | PHI | Sean Couturier (3) | Kevin Hayes (8), James van Riemsdyk (13) | 14:48 | PHI 2–1 |
| 1st | BOS | Charlie McAvoy (2) | Brad Marchand (11), Connor Clifton (1) | 15:27 | TIED 2–2 |
| 2nd | BOS | David Pastrnak (8) | Nick Ritchie (7) | 0:46 | BOS 3–2 |
| 2nd | BOS | Charlie Coyle (3) | Craig Smith (3) | 16:14 | BOS 4–2 |
| 2nd | BOS | Trent Frederic (1) | John Moore (1), Connor Clifton (2) | 16:47 | BOS 5–2 |
| 2nd | BOS | Nick Ritchie (6) (PPG) | John Moore (2), Craig Smith (4) | 17:53 | BOS 6–2 |
| 3rd | PHI | James van Riemsdyk (8) (PPG) | Kevin Hayes (9), Ivan Provorov (6) | 12:45 | BOS 6–3 |
| 3rd | BOS | David Pastrnak (9) | Jack Studnicka (1) | 17:04 | BOS 7–3 |

Number in parentheses represents the player's total in goals or assists to that point of the season

Penalty summary
| Period | Team | Player | Penalty | Time | PIM |
|---|---|---|---|---|---|
| 1st | PHI | Sean Couturier | Tripping | 12:34 | 2:00 |
| 2nd | PHI | served by Andy Andreoff | Too many men on the ice | 6:17 | 2:00 |
| 2nd | PHI | Andy Andreoff | Roughing | 16:47 | 2:00 |
| 2nd | BOS | Anders Bjork | Holding | 18:16 | 2:00 |
| 3rd | BOS | Anders Bjork | Hooking | 9:31 | 2:00 |
| 3rd | BOS | Brandon Carlo | Interference | 12:37 | 2:00 |

Shots by period
| Team | 1 | 2 | 3 | Total |
|---|---|---|---|---|
| PHI | 11 | 3 | 5 | 19 |
| BOS | 8 | 15 | 12 | 35 |

Power play opportunities
| Team | Goals/Opportunities |
|---|---|
| Philadelphia | 1 / 3 |
| Boston | 1 / 3 |

Three star selections
| | Team | Player | Statistics |
|---|---|---|---|
| 1st | BOS | David Pastrnak | 3 goals |
| 2nd | BOS | Brad Marchand | 2 assists |
| 3rd | PHI | James van Riemsdyk | 1 goal, 2 assists |

=== Team rosters ===
Philadelphia Flyers
| # | | Player | Position |
|---|---|---|---|
| 3 | (Canada) | Mark Friedman | D |
| 5 | (Canada) | Philippe Myers† | D |
| 6 | (Canada) | Travis Sanheim | D |
| 8 | (Sweden) | Robert Hagg | D |
| 9 | (Russia) | Ivan Provorov† (A) | D |
| 10 | (Canada) | Andy Andreoff | C |
| 12 | (Austria) | Michael Raffl | LW |
| 13 | (United States) | Kevin Hayes (A) | RW |
| 14 | (Canada) | Sean Couturier† (A) | C |
| 19 | (Canada) | Nolan Patrick | C |
| 25 | (United States) | James van Riemsdyk† | LW |
| 37 | (Canada) | Brian Elliott | G |
| 53 | (United States) | Shayne Gostisbehere | D |
| 55 | (Canada) | Samuel Morin | D |
| 56 | (Sweden) | Erik Gustafsson | D |
| 62 | (Canada) | Nicholas Aube-Kubel | RW |
| 64 | (Belarus) | Maxim Sushko | RW |
| 79 | (Canada) | Carter Hart† | G |
| 82 | (Canada) | Connor Bunnaman | C |
| 86 | (United States) | Joel Farabee† | LW |
Head coach: (Canada) Alain Vigneault

Boston Bruins
| # | | Player | Position |
|---|---|---|---|
| 10 | (United States) | Anders Bjork | LW |
| 11 | (United States) | Trent Frederic | C |
| 12 | (United States) | Craig Smith | C |
| 13 | (United States) | Charlie Coyle | C |
| 14 | (United States) | Chris Wagner | RW |
| 21 | (Canada) | Nick Ritchie | LW |
| 23 | (United States) | Jack Studnicka | C |
| 25 | (Canada) | Brandon Carlo (A) | D |
| 27 | (United States) | John Moore | D |
| 37 | (Canada) | Patrice Bergeron† (C) | C |
| 40 | (Finland) | Tuukka Rask† | G |
| 41 | (Slovakia) | Jaroslav Halak | G |
| 52 | (United States) | Sean Kuraly | C |
| 55 | (Canada) | Jeremy Lauzon† | D |
| 58 | (Finland) | Urho Vaakanainen | D |
| 63 | (Canada) | Brad Marchand† (A) | C |
| 73 | (United States) | Charlie McAvoy† | D |
| 74 | (Canada) | Jake DeBrusk | LW |
| 75 | (Canada) | Connor Clifton | D |
| 88 | (Czech Republic) | David Pastrnak† | RW |
Head coach: (Canada) Bruce Cassidy

Brian Elliott and Jaroslav Halak dressed as the back-up goaltenders. Elliott played the third period for Philadelphia.
† Starting lineup.

=== Scratches ===
- Philadelphia Flyers: Claude Giroux, Justin Braun, David Kase
- Boston Bruins: Steven Kampfer, David Krejci, Kevan Miller

== Officials ==
The same officials worked both games:

- Referees: Wes McCauley, Kelly Sutherland
- Linesmen: Matt MacPherson, Jonny Murray

== Media ==
Both games were originally planned to be televised in the United States on NBC. Coverage of the Saturday game began as scheduled on NBC, but was then moved to NBCSN due to the delay. As a result of the Sunday game being moved to a 7:30 p.m. ET start time, it too was moved from NBC to NBCSN (with an evening game between the New Jersey Devils and Washington Capitals swapped into NBC's afternoon window as a replacement). Mike Tirico provided the play-by-play commentary with United States Hockey Hall of Fame member and analyst Eddie Olczyk and "Inside-the-Glass" reporter Brian Boucher. Rutledge Wood meanwhile, served as an on-site reporter in Lake Tahoe. These were the last outdoor games broadcast on NBC.

Both games were originally scheduled to be simulcast on Sportsnet in Canada. Due to the conflict with the Calgary Flames–Edmonton Oilers Hockey Night in Canada broadcast, coverage of the delayed second and third periods of Saturday's game began on Sportsnet One before Sportsnet joined it in progress. The second game was also moved to Sportsnet One.
