= 2020–21 Los Angeles Kings season =

Season of play of professional ice hockey team

2020–21 Los Angeles Kings
- Division: 6th West
- 2020–21 record: 21–28–7
- Home record: 9–14–5
- Road record: 12–14–2
- Goals for: 143
- Goals against: 170

Team information
- General manager: Rob Blake
- Coach: Todd McLellan
- Captain: Anze Kopitar
- Alternate captains: Dustin Brown; Drew Doughty; Jeff Carter; Alex Iafallo
- Arena: Staples Center
- Minor league affiliate: Ontario Reign (AHL)

Team leaders
- Goals: Dustin Brown (17)
- Assists: Anze Kopitar (37)
- Points: Anze Kopitar (50)
- Penalty minutes: Kurtis MacDermid (36)
- Plus/minus: Blake Lizotte; Austin Strand (+2)
- Wins: Jonathan Quick (11)
- Goals against average: Jonathan Quick (2.86)

The 2020–21 Los Angeles Kings season was the 54th season (53rd season of play) for the National Hockey League (NHL) franchise that was established on June 5, 1967. On December 20, 2020, the league temporarily realigned into four divisions with no conferences due to the COVID-19 pandemic and the ongoing closure of the Canada–United States border. As a result of this realignment, the Kings played this season in the West Division and only played games against the other teams in their new division during the regular season.

On May 7, 2021, the Kings were eliminated from playoff contention after a 3–2 loss to the Colorado Avalanche, failing to make the playoffs for a third consecutive season.

== Standings ==
=== Divisional standings ===
West Division
Pos	Team	GP	W	L	OTL	RW	GF	GA	GD	Pts
1	p – Colorado Avalanche	56	39	13	4	35	197	133	+64	82
2	x – Vegas Golden Knights	56	40	14	2	30	191	124	+67	82
3	x – Minnesota Wild	56	35	16	5	27	181	160	+21	75
4	x – St. Louis Blues	56	27	20	9	19	169	170	−1	63
5	Arizona Coyotes	56	24	26	6	19	153	176	−23	54
6	Los Angeles Kings	56	21	28	7	19	143	170	−27	49
7	San Jose Sharks	56	21	28	7	15	151	199	−48	49
8	Anaheim Ducks	56	17	30	9	11	126	179	−53	43

Source: National Hockey League
Rules for classification: 1) Fewer number of games played (GP, only during regular season); 2) Greater number of regulation wins (RW); 3) Greater number of wins in regulation and overtime, excluding shootout wins (ROW); 4) Greater number of total wins, including shootouts (W); 5) Greater number of points earned in head-to-head play; if teams played an uneven number of head-to-head games, the result of the first game on the home ice of the team with the extra home game is discarded; 6) Greater goal differential (GD); 7) Greater number of goals scored (GF)
p – Clinched Presidents' Trophy; x – Clinched playoff spot

== Schedule and results ==
=== Regular season ===
The regular season schedule was published on December 23, 2020.

2020–21 game log

January: 3–3–2 (Home: 1–1–2; Road: 2–2–0)
#	Date	Visitor	Score	Home	OT	Decision	Attendance	Record	Pts	Recap
1	January 14	Minnesota	4–3	Los Angeles	OT	Quick	0	0–0–1	1
2	January 16	Minnesota	4–3	Los Angeles	OT	Quick	0	0–0–2	2
3	January 19	Colorado	3–2	Los Angeles		Petersen	0	0–1–2	2
4	January 21	Colorado	2–4	Los Angeles		Quick	0	1–1–2	4
5	January 23	Los Angeles	2–4	St. Louis		Petersen	0	1–2–2	4
6	January 24	Los Angeles	6–3	St. Louis		Quick	0	2–2–2	6
7	January 26	Los Angeles	2–1	Minnesota		Petersen	0	3–2–2	8
8	January 28	Los Angeles	3–5	Minnesota		Quick	0	3–3–2	8

February: 6–4–2 (Home: 2–1–1; Road: 4–3–1)
#	Date	Visitor	Score	Home	OT	Decision	Attendance	Record	Pts	Recap
9	February 2	Anaheim	3–1	Los Angeles		Petersen	0	3–4–2	8
10	February 5	Los Angeles	2–5	Vegas		Quick	0	3–5–2	8
11	February 7	Los Angeles	3–4	Vegas		Petersen	0	3–6–2	8
12	February 9	San Jose	4–3	Los Angeles	SO	Petersen	0	3–6–3	9
13	February 11	San Jose	2–6	Los Angeles		Petersen	0	4–6–3	11
—	February 13	Minnesota	–	Los Angeles	Postponed due to COVID-19. Rescheduled for April 23.
14	February 16	Minnesota	0–4	Los Angeles		Quick	0	5–6–3	13
15	February 18	Los Angeles	3–2	Arizona	SO	Quick	2,281	6–6–3	15
16	February 20	Los Angeles	4–2	Arizona		Petersen	3,187	7–6–3	17
17	February 22	Los Angeles	3–0	St. Louis		Quick	— (Note: Fans were in attendance, but the exact number was not reported.)	8–6–3	19
18	February 24	Los Angeles	2–1	St. Louis		Petersen	—	9–6–3	21
19	February 26	Los Angeles	1–3	Minnesota		Quick	0	9–7–3	21
20	February 27	Los Angeles	3–4	Minnesota	OT	Petersen	0	9–7–4	22

March: 5–7–2 (Home: 3–2–1; Road: 2–5–1)
#	Date	Visitor	Score	Home	OT	Decision	Attendance	Record	Pts	Recap
21	March 3	Arizona	3–2	Los Angeles		Quick	0	9–8–4	22
22	March 5	St. Louis	3–2	Los Angeles	OT	Petersen	0	9–8–5	23
23	March 6	St. Louis	3–4	Los Angeles	OT	Quick	0	10–8–5	25
24	March 8	Los Angeles	5–6	Anaheim	OT	Petersen	0	10–8–6	26
25	March 10	Los Angeles	5–1	Anaheim		Grosenick	0	11–8–6	28
26	March 12	Los Angeles	0–2	Colorado		Petersen	0	11–9–6	28
27	March 14	Los Angeles	1–4	Colorado		Petersen	0	11–10–6	28
—	March 15	St. Louis	–	Los Angeles	Postponed due to the March 2021 North American blizzard. (Note: Los Angeles was not affected. The Kings, who were coming off of a two-game series against the Avalanche, were stranded in Denver due to the blizzard.) Rescheduled for May 10.
28	March 17	St. Louis	1–4	Los Angeles		Petersen	0	12–10–6	30
29	March 19	Vegas	4–2	Los Angeles		Quick	0	12–11–6	30
30	March 21	Vegas	1–3	Los Angeles		Petersen	0	13–11–6	32
31	March 22	Los Angeles	1–2	San Jose		Quick	0	13–12–6	32
32	March 24	Los Angeles	2–4	San Jose		Petersen	0	13–13–6	32
33	March 29	Los Angeles	1–4	Vegas		Quick	3,950	13–14–6	32
34	March 31	Los Angeles	4–2	Vegas		Petersen	3,950	14–14–6	34

April: 5–9–0 (Home: 3–8–0; Road: 2–1–0)
#	Date	Visitor	Score	Home	OT	Decision	Attendance	Record	Pts	Recap
35	April 2	San Jose	3–0	Los Angeles		Petersen	0	14–15–6	34
36	April 3	San Jose	3–2	Los Angeles		Quick	0	14–16–6	34
37	April 5	Arizona	5–2	Los Angeles		Petersen	0	14–17–6	34
38	April 7	Arizona	3–4	Los Angeles		Quick	0	15–17–6	36
39	April 9	Los Angeles	2–5	San Jose		Petersen	0	15–18–6	36
40	April 10	Los Angeles	4–2	San Jose		Quick	0	16–18–6	38
41	April 12	Vegas	4–2	Los Angeles		Petersen	0	16–19–6	38
42	April 14	Vegas	6–2	Los Angeles		Quick	0	16–20–6	38
—	April 16	Los Angeles	–	Colorado	Postponed due to COVID-19. Rescheduled for May 12.
—	April 18	Los Angeles	–	Colorado	Postponed due to COVID-19. Rescheduled for May 13.
43	April 20	Anaheim	1–4	Los Angeles		Petersen	1,431	17–20–6	40
44	April 23	Minnesota	4–2	Los Angeles		Petersen	1,091	17–21–6	40
45	April 24	Arizona	4–0	Los Angeles		Petersen	1,497	17–22–6	40
46	April 26	Anaheim	1–4	Los Angeles		Quick	1,373	18–22–6	42
47	April 28	Anaheim	3–2	Los Angeles		Petersen	1,763	18–23–6	42
48	April 30	Los Angeles	2–1	Anaheim		Quick	1,717	19–23–6	44

May: 2–5–1 (Home: 0–2–1; Road: 2–3–0)
#	Date	Visitor	Score	Home	OT	Decision	Attendance	Record	Pts	Recap
49	May 1	Los Angeles	2–6	Anaheim		Petersen	1,717	19–24–6	44
50	May 3	Los Angeles	3–2	Arizona		Quick	4,983	20–24–6	46
51	May 5	Los Angeles	4–2	Arizona		Petersen	6,964	21–24–6	48
52	May 7	Colorado	3–2	Los Angeles		Petersen	2,115	21–25–6	48
53	May 8	Colorado	3–2	Los Angeles		Petersen	2,482	21–26–6	48
54	May 10	St. Louis	2–1	Los Angeles	OT	Petersen	2,154	21–26–7	49
55	May 12	Los Angeles	0–6	Colorado		Petersen	4,042	21–27–7	49
56	May 13	Los Angeles	1–5	Colorado		Grosenick	4,045	21–28–7	49

Legend: Win (2 points) Loss (0 points) Overtime/shootout loss (1 point) Postponement

== Transactions ==
The Kings have been involved in the following transactions during the 2020–21 season.

== Free agents ==
Note: This does not include players who have re-signed with their previous team as an unrestricted free agent or as a restricted free agent.

Date	Player	New team	Previous team	Ref
October 9, 2020	Mark Alt	Los Angeles Kings	Colorado Avalanche	
October 9, 2020	Troy Grosenick	Los Angeles Kings	Nashville Predators	
October 10, 2020	Paul LaDue	Washington Capitals	Los Angeles Kings	
October 12, 2020	Joakim Ryan	Carolina Hurricanes	Los Angeles Kings	
October 16, 2020	Sheldon Rempal	Carolina Hurricanes	Los Angeles Kings	
January 13, 2021	Trevor Lewis	Winnipeg Jets	Los Angeles Kings	

== Trades ==
* Retained Salary Transaction: Each team is allowed up to three contracts on their payroll where they have retained salary in a trade (i.e. the player no longer plays with Team A due to a trade to Team B, but Team A still retains some salary). Only up to 50% of a player's contract can be kept, and only up to 15% of a team's salary cap can be taken up by retained salary. A contract can only be involved in one of these trades twice.

Hover over-retained salary or conditional transactions for more information.

=== October ===
October 7, 2020	To Los Angeles Kings Lias Andersson	To New York Rangers VGK 2nd-round pick in 2020
October 7, 2020	To Los Angeles Kings EDM 2nd-round pick in 2020 (#45 overall)	To Detroit Red Wings VAN 2nd-round pick in 2020 (#51 overall); 4th-round pick in 2020 (#97 overall)
October 7, 2020	To Los Angeles Kings MTL 5th-round pick in 2020 (#140 overall)	To Carolina Hurricanes 6th-round pick in 2020 (#159 overall); 7th-round pick in 2021

=== March ===
March 27, 2021	To Los Angeles Kings Brendan Lemieux	To New York Rangers 4th-round pick in 2021
March 29, 2021	To Los Angeles Kings Christian Wolanin	To Ottawa Senators Michael Amadio

=== April ===
April 11, 2021	To Los Angeles Kings Conditional draft picks	To Pittsburgh Penguins Jeff Carter

== Draft picks ==
Below are the Los Angeles Kings' selections at the 2020 NHL entry draft, which was originally scheduled for June 26–27, 2020 at the Bell Center in Montreal, Quebec, but was postponed on March 25, 2020, due to the COVID-19 pandemic. It was held October 6–7, 2020 virtually via Video conference call from the NHL Network studio in Secaucus, New Jersey.

Round	#	Player	Pos	Nationality	College/Junior/Club team (League)
1	2	Quinton Byfield	C	Canada	Sudbury Wolves (OHL)
2	35	Helge Grans	D	Sweden	Malmö Redhawks (SHL)
2	51	Brock Faber	D	United States	U.S. NTDP (USHL)
3	66	Kasper Sinomtaival	RW	Finland	Tappara (Liiga)
3	83	Alex Laferriere	RW	United States	Des Moines Buccaneers (USHL)
4	112	Joho Markkanen	G	Finland	Kettera (Mestis)
5	128	Matin Chrormiak	RW	Slovakia	Kingston Frontenacs (OHL)
7	190	Aatu Jamsen	RW	Finland	Lahti Pelicans U20 (Jr. A)
