= 2020–21 Arizona Coyotes season =

Season of play of professional ice hockey team

2020–21 Arizona Coyotes
- Division: 5th West
- 2020–21 record: 24–26–6
- Home record: 12–12–4
- Road record: 12–14–2
- Goals for: 153
- Goals against: 176

Team information
- General manager: Bill Armstrong
- Coach: Rick Tocchet
- Captain: Oliver Ekman-Larsson
- Alternate captains: Derick Brassard; Niklas Hjalmarsson; Phil Kessel
- Arena: Gila River Arena
- Minor league affiliates: Tucson Roadrunners (AHL); Rapid City Rush (ECHL)

Team leaders
- Goals: Phil Kessel (20)
- Assists: Conor Garland (27)
- Points: Phil Kessel (43)
- Penalty minutes: Lawson Crouse (46)
- Plus/minus: Victor Soderstrom (+4)
- Wins: Darcy Kuemper (10)
- Goals against average: Darcy Kuemper (2.56)

The 2020–21 Arizona Coyotes season was the 42nd season for the National Hockey League (NHL) franchise that was established on June 22, 1979, the 25th season since the franchise relocated from Winnipeg following the 1995–96 NHL season, and the 49th overall, including the World Hockey Association years. This would have been the final year of the Coyotes being in the Pacific Division in the 2020–21 season before the new NHL expansion team the Seattle Kraken enters into the Pacific Division in the 2021–22 NHL season. However, on December 20, 2020, the league temporarily realigned into four divisions with no conferences due to the COVID-19 pandemic and the ongoing closure of the Canada–United States border. As a result of this realignment, the Coyotes played this season in the West Division and only played games against the other teams in their new division during the regular season.

On May 5, 2021, the Coyotes were eliminated from playoff contention after a 4–2 loss to the Los Angeles Kings.

== Standings ==
=== Divisional standings ===
West Division
Pos	Team	GP	W	L	OTL	RW	GF	GA	GD	Pts
1	p – Colorado Avalanche	56	39	13	4	35	197	133	+64	82
2	x – Vegas Golden Knights	56	40	14	2	30	191	124	+67	82
3	x – Minnesota Wild	56	35	16	5	27	181	160	+21	75
4	x – St. Louis Blues	56	27	20	9	19	169	170	−1	63
5	Arizona Coyotes	56	24	26	6	19	153	176	−23	54
6	Los Angeles Kings	56	21	28	7	19	143	170	−27	49
7	San Jose Sharks	56	21	28	7	15	151	199	−48	49
8	Anaheim Ducks	56	17	30	9	11	126	179	−53	43

Source: National Hockey League
Rules for classification: 1) Fewer number of games played (GP, only during regular season); 2) Greater number of regulation wins (RW); 3) Greater number of wins in regulation and overtime, excluding shootout wins (ROW); 4) Greater number of total wins, including shootouts (W); 5) Greater number of points earned in head-to-head play; if teams played an uneven number of head-to-head games, the result of the first game on the home ice of the team with the extra home game is discarded; 6) Greater goal differential (GD); 7) Greater number of goals scored (GF)
p – Clinched Presidents' Trophy; x – Clinched playoff spot

== Schedule and results ==
=== Regular season ===
The regular season schedule was announced on December 23, 2020.

2020–21 game log

January: 3–4–1 (Home: 3–2–1; Road: 0–2–0)
#	Date	Visitor	Score	Home	OT	Decision	Attendance	Record	Pts	Recap
1	January 14	San Jose	4–3	Arizona	SO	Kuemper	2,274	0–0–1	1
2	January 16	San Jose	3–5	Arizona		Raanta	2,384	1–0–1	3
3	January 18	Arizona	2–4	Vegas		Kuemper	0	1–1–1	3
4	January 20	Arizona	2–5	Vegas		Kuemper	0	1–2–1	3
5	January 22	Vegas	2–5	Arizona		Kuemper	2,712	2–2–1	5
6	January 24	Vegas	1–0	Arizona		Kuemper	2,672	2–3–1	5
7	January 26	Anaheim	1–0	Arizona		Kuemper	1,808	2–4–1	5
8	January 28	Anaheim	2–3	Arizona		Kuemper	2,252	3–4–1	7

February: 6–5–2 (Home: 3–4–2; Road: 3–1–0)
#	Date	Visitor	Score	Home	OT	Decision	Attendance	Record	Pts	Recap
9	February 2	Arizona	3–4	St. Louis		Kuemper	1,400	3–5–1	7
10	February 4	Arizona	4–3	St. Louis		Raanta	— (Note: Fans were in attendance, but the exact number was not reported.)	4–5–1	9
—	February 6	Arizona	–	Minnesota	Postponed due to COVID-19. Rescheduled for March 16.
11 (Note: The following games have been rescheduled: Arizona at St. Louis originally scheduled for March 29, is now scheduled for February 6.; Arizona at St. Louis originally scheduled for March 31, is now scheduled for February 8.)	February 6	Arizona	3–1	St. Louis		Kuemper	—	5–5–1	11
—	February 7	Arizona	–	Minnesota	Postponed due to COVID-19. Rescheduled for April 14.
12	February 8	Arizona	4–3	St. Louis	SO	Kuemper	—	6–5–1	13
—	February 9	Arizona	–	Colorado	Postponed due to COVID-19. Rescheduled for March 31.
—	February 11	Arizona	–	Colorado	Postponed due to COVID-19. Rescheduled for April 12.
13 (Note: The following game has been rescheduled: St. Louis at Arizona originally scheduled for April 15, is now scheduled for February 12.)	February 12	St. Louis	4–1	Arizona		Kuemper	2,457	6–6–1	13
14	February 13	St. Louis	5–4	Arizona	OT	Raanta	3,237	6–6–2	14
15	February 15	St. Louis	0–1	Arizona		Kuemper	2,554	7–6–2	16
16	February 18	Los Angeles	3–2	Arizona	SO	Kuemper	2,281	7–6–3	17
17	February 20	Los Angeles	4–2	Arizona		Kuemper	3,187	7–7–3	17
18	February 22	Anaheim	3–4	Arizona		Kuemper	2,346	8–7–3	19
19	February 24	Anaheim	3–4	Arizona	SO	Hill	2,319	9–7–3	21
20 (Note: The following games have been rescheduled: Colorado at Arizona originally scheduled for February 25, is now scheduled for February 26.; Arizona at Los Angeles originally scheduled for April 23, is now scheduled for March 3.; Arizona at Anaheim originally scheduled for March 16, is now scheduled for March 20.)	February 26	Colorado	3–2	Arizona		Hill	2,495	9–8–3	21
21	February 27	Colorado	6–2	Arizona		Raanta	3,224	9–9–3	21

March: 7–6–2 (Home: 4–2–0; Road: 3–4–2)
#	Date	Visitor	Score	Home	OT	Decision	Attendance	Record	Pts	Recap
22	March 3	Arizona	3–2	Los Angeles		Raanta	0	10–9–3	23
23	March 5	Minnesota	5–1	Arizona		Raanta	2,541	10–10–3	23
24	March 6	Minnesota	2–5	Arizona		Kuemper	3,141	11–10–3	25
25	March 8	Arizona	3–2	Colorado		Raanta	0	12–10–3	27
26	March 10	Arizona	1–2	Colorado	OT	Raanta	0	12–10–4	28
27	March 12	Arizona	0–4	Minnesota		Hill	0	12–11–4	28
28	March 14	Arizona	1–4	Minnesota		Raanta	0	12–12–4	28
29	March 16	Arizona	0–3	Minnesota		Hill	0	12–13–4	28
30	March 18	Arizona	2–3	Anaheim	OT	Hill	0	12–13–5	29
31	March 20	Arizona	5–1	Anaheim		Raanta	0	13–13–5	31
32	March 22	Colorado	5–1	Arizona		Raanta	2,593	13–14–5	31
33	March 23	Colorado	4–5	Arizona	SO	Hill	2,539	14–14–5	33
34	March 26	San Jose	2–5	Arizona		Hill	3,007	15–14–5	35
35	March 27	San Jose	0–4	Arizona		Hill	3,217	16–14–5	37
36	March 31	Arizona	3–9	Colorado		Hill	0	16–15–5	37

April: 6–9–0 (Home: 2–2–0; Road: 4–7–0)
#	Date	Visitor	Score	Home	OT	Decision	Attendance	Record	Pts	Recap
37	April 2	Arizona	4–2	Anaheim		Hill	0	17–15–5	39
38	April 4	Arizona	3–2	Anaheim	OT	Hill	0	18–15–5	41
39	April 5	Arizona	5–2	Los Angeles		Hill	0	19–15–5	43
40	April 7	Arizona	3–4	Los Angeles		Hill	0	19–16–5	43
41	April 9	Arizona	4–7	Vegas		Hill	3,950	19–17–5	43
42	April 11	Arizona	0–1	Vegas		Hill	3,950	19–18–5	43
43	April 12	Arizona	2–4	Colorado		Prosvetov	4,042	19–19–5	43
44	April 14	Arizona	2–5	Minnesota		Raanta	3,000	19–20–5	43
45	April 17	St. Louis	2–3	Arizona		Kuemper	3,981	20–20–5	45
46	April 19	Minnesota	5–2	Arizona		Kuemper	3,481	20–21–5	45
47	April 21	Minnesota	4–1	Arizona		Kuemper	3,736	20–22–5	45
48	April 24	Arizona	4–0	Los Angeles		Kuemper	1,497	21–22–5	47
49	April 26	Arizona	4–6	San Jose		Hill	520	21–23–5	47
50	April 28	Arizona	2–4	San Jose		Kuemper	1,037	21–24–5	47
51	April 30	Vegas	0–3	Arizona		Hill	5,111	22–24–5	49

May: 2–2–1 (Home: 0–2–1; Road: 2–0–0)
#	Date	Visitor	Score	Home	OT	Decision	Attendance	Record	Pts	Recap
52	May 1	Vegas	3–2	Arizona	OT	Kuemper	5,671	22–24–6	50
53	May 3	Los Angeles	3–2	Arizona		Kuemper	4,983	22–25–6	50
54	May 5	Los Angeles	4–2	Arizona		Hill	6,964	22–26–6	50
55	May 7	Arizona	5–2	San Jose		Kuemper	1,145	23–26–6	52
56	May 8	Arizona	5–4	San Jose	OT	Hill	1,249	24–26–6	54

Legend: Win (2 points) Loss (0 points) Overtime/shootout loss (1 point) Postponement

== Draft picks ==
Below are the Arizona Coyotes' selections at the 2020 NHL entry draft, which was originally scheduled for June 26–27, 2020 at the Bell Center in Montreal, Quebec, but was postponed on March 25, 2020, due to the COVID-19 pandemic. The draft was held October 6–7, 2020 virtually via Video conference call from the NHL Network studio in Secaucus, New Jersey.

Round	#	Player	Pos	Nationality	College/Junior/Club team (League)
2	49	Forfeited pick (Note: The Coyotes' second-round pick in 2020 was forfeited as the result of a penalty sanction due to violations of the NHL Combine Testing Policy during the 2019–20 NHL season. The penalty included the forfeiture of a first-round pick in 2021.)			
4	111	Mitchell Miller (renounced) (Note: After controversy with Mitchell Miller, the Coyotes decided to renounce the pick on October 29, 2020.)	D	United States	Tri-City Storm (USHL)
5	142	Carson Bantle	LW	United States	Michigan Tech (WCHA)
6	173	Filip Barklund	C	Sweden	Orebro Jr. (J20 SuperElit)
7	192	Elliot Ekefjard	RW	Sweden	Malmö Redhawks Jr. (J20 SuperElit)
7	204	Ben McCartney	LW	Canada	Brandon Wheat Kings (WHL)
