= 2020–21 Vegas Golden Knights season =

Season of play of professional ice hockey team

2020–21 Vegas Golden Knights
- Division: 2nd West
- 2020–21 record: 40–14–2
- Home record: 21–5–2
- Road record: 19–9–0
- Goals for: 191
- Goals against: 124

Team information
- General manager: Kelly McCrimmon
- Coach: Peter DeBoer
- Captain: Mark Stone
- Alternate captains: Alex Pietrangelo; Reilly Smith
- Arena: T-Mobile Arena
- Minor league affiliates: Henderson Silver Knights (AHL); Fort Wayne Komets (ECHL)

Team leaders
- Goals: Max Pacioretty (24)
- Assists: Mark Stone (40)
- Points: Mark Stone (61)
- Penalty minutes: Jonathan Marchessault (39)
- Plus/minus: Shea Theodore (+28)
- Wins: Marc-Andre Fleury (26)
- Goals against average: Marc-Andre Fleury (1.98)

The 2020–21 Vegas Golden Knights season was the fourth season for the National Hockey League (NHL) franchise that started playing in the 2017–18 season. They played their home games at T-Mobile Arena on the Las Vegas Strip in Paradise, Nevada. They made the playoffs for the fourth straight season after losing in the Conference Final to the Dallas Stars in the 2020 Stanley Cup playoffs. On December 20, 2020, the league temporarily realigned into four divisions with no conferences due to the COVID-19 pandemic and the ongoing closure of the Canada–United States border. As a result of this realignment, the Golden Knights played this season in the West Division and only played games against the other teams in their new division during the regular season, and potentially the first two rounds of the playoffs.

On April 21, the Golden Knights clinched a playoff berth after a 5–2 win over the San Jose Sharks. They were tied with the Colorado Avalanche for first in the league, as well as first in the West Division, but lost the chance to claim their first ever Presidents' Trophy because of a tiebreaker, as they finished with fewer regulation wins than Colorado. The Golden Knights eliminated the Minnesota Wild in the First Round, with a 6–2 victory. In the Second Round, the Golden Knights defeated the Avalanche in six games. They faced the Montreal Canadiens in the Stanley Cup Semifinals, but were defeated in six games.

== Standings ==
=== Divisional standings ===
West Division
Pos	Team	GP	W	L	OTL	RW	GF	GA	GD	Pts
1	p – Colorado Avalanche	56	39	13	4	35	197	133	+64	82
2	x – Vegas Golden Knights	56	40	14	2	30	191	124	+67	82
3	x – Minnesota Wild	56	35	16	5	27	181	160	+21	75
4	x – St. Louis Blues	56	27	20	9	19	169	170	−1	63
5	Arizona Coyotes	56	24	26	6	19	153	176	−23	54
6	Los Angeles Kings	56	21	28	7	19	143	170	−27	49
7	San Jose Sharks	56	21	28	7	15	151	199	−48	49
8	Anaheim Ducks	56	17	30	9	11	126	179	−53	43

Source: National Hockey League
Rules for classification: 1) Fewer number of games played (GP, only during regular season); 2) Greater number of regulation wins (RW); 3) Greater number of wins in regulation and overtime, excluding shootout wins (ROW); 4) Greater number of total wins, including shootouts (W); 5) Greater number of points earned in head-to-head play; if teams played an uneven number of head-to-head games, the result of the first game on the home ice of the team with the extra home game is discarded; 6) Greater goal differential (GD); 7) Greater number of goals scored (GF)
p – Clinched Presidents' Trophy; x – Clinched playoff spot

== Schedule and results ==
=== Regular season ===
The regular season schedule was published on December 23, 2020.

2020–21 game log

January: 5–1–1 (Home: 4–0–1; Road: 1–1–0)
#	Date	Visitor	Score	Home	OT	Decision	Attendance	Record	Pts	Recap
1	January 14	Anaheim	2–5	Vegas		Lehner	0	1–0–0	2
2	January 16	Anaheim	1–2	Vegas	OT	Fleury	0	2–0–0	4
3	January 18	Arizona	2–4	Vegas		Lehner	0	3–0–0	6
4	January 20	Arizona	2–5	Vegas		Fleury	0	4–0–0	8
5	January 22	Vegas	2–5	Arizona		Lehner	2,712	4–1–0	8
6	January 24	Vegas	1–0	Arizona		Fleury	2,672	5–1–0	10
7	January 26	St. Louis	5–4	Vegas	SO	Lehner	0	5–1–1	11
—	January 28	St. Louis	–	Vegas	Postponed due to COVID-19. Makeup date March 22.

February: 7–3–0 (Home: 4–2–0; Road: 3–1–0)
#	Date	Visitor	Score	Home	OT	Decision	Attendance	Record	Pts	Recap
—	February 1	Vegas	–	San Jose	Postponed due to COVID-19. Makeup date February 13.
—	February 3	Vegas	–	San Jose	Postponed due to COVID-19. Makeup date February 25.
8	February 5	Los Angeles	2–5	Vegas		Fleury	0	6–1–1	13
9	February 7	Los Angeles	3–4	Vegas		Lehner	0	7–1–1	15
10	February 9	Anaheim	4–5	Vegas		Fleury	0	8–1–1	17
11	February 11	Anaheim	1–0	Vegas		Fleury	0	8–2–1	17
12	February 13	Vegas	3–1	San Jose		Fleury	0	9–2–1	19
13	February 14	Colorado	0–1	Vegas		Fleury	0	10–2–1	21
14	February 16	Colorado	3–2	Vegas		Fleury	0	10–3–1	21
15	February 20	Vegas	2–3	Colorado		Fleury	0 (outdoors)	10–4–1	21
16	February 22	Vegas	3–0	Colorado		Fleury	0	11–4–1	23
—	February 25	Vegas	–	San Jose	Postponed due to COVID-19. Makeup date May 12.
17	February 27	Vegas	3–2	Anaheim	OT	Fleury	0	12–4–1	25

March: 12–5–0 (Home: 6–1–0; Road: 6–4–0)
#	Date	Visitor	Score	Home	OT	Decision	Attendance	Record	Pts	Recap
18	March 1	Minnesota	4–5	Vegas	OT	Fleury	2,605	13–4–1	27
19	March 3	Minnesota	1–5	Vegas		Fleury	2,610	14–4–1	29
20	March 5	Vegas	5–4	San Jose	OT	Dansk	0	15–4–1	31
21	March 6	Vegas	4–0	San Jose		Fleury	0	16–4–1	33
22	March 8	Vegas	0–2	Minnesota		Fleury	0	16–5–1	33
23	March 10	Vegas	3–4	Minnesota		Fleury	0	16–6–1	33
24	March 12	Vegas	5–4	St. Louis	OT	Fleury	— (Note: Spectators were in attendance, but the exact number was not reported.)	17–6–1	35
25	March 13	Vegas	5–1	St. Louis		Fleury	—	18–6–1	37
26	March 15	San Jose	1–2	Vegas		Fleury	3,473	19–6–1	39
27	March 17	San Jose	4–5	Vegas		Fleury	3,473	20–6–1	41
28	March 19	Vegas	4–2	Los Angeles		Lehner	0	21–6–1	43
29	March 21	Vegas	1–3	Los Angeles		Fleury	0	21–7–1	43
30	March 22	St. Louis	1–5	Vegas		Lehner	3,750	22–7–1	45
31	March 25	Vegas	1–5	Colorado		Fleury	0	22–8–1	45
32	March 27	Vegas	3–2	Colorado	OT	Fleury	0	23–8–1	47
33	March 29	Los Angeles	1–4	Vegas		Lehner	3,950	24–8–1	49
34	March 31	Los Angeles	4–2	Vegas		Fleury	3,950	24–9–1	49

April: 11–3–1 (Home: 5–1–1; Road: 6–2–0)
#	Date	Visitor	Score	Home	OT	Decision	Attendance	Record	Pts	Recap
35	April 1	Minnesota	3–2	Vegas	SO	Lehner	3,950	24–9–2	50
36	April 3	Minnesota	2–1	Vegas		Fleury	3,950	24–10–2	50
37	April 5	Vegas	6–1	St. Louis		Lehner	—	25–10–2	52
38	April 7	Vegas	1–3	St. Louis		Fleury	—	25–11–2	52
39	April 9	Arizona	4–7	Vegas		Lehner	3,950	26–11–2	54
40	April 11	Arizona	0–1	Vegas		Fleury	3,950	27–11–2	56
41	April 12	Vegas	4–2	Los Angeles		Lehner	0	28–11–2	58
42	April 14	Vegas	6–2	Los Angeles		Fleury	0	29–11–2	60
43	April 16	Vegas	4–0	Anaheim		Lehner	1,717	30–11–2	62
44	April 18	Vegas	5–2	Anaheim		Fleury	1,717	31–11–2	64
45	April 19	San Jose	2–3	Vegas	SO	Lehner	3,950	32–11–2	66
46	April 21	San Jose	2–5	Vegas		Fleury	3,950	33–11–2	68
47	April 24	Vegas	5–1	Anaheim		Lehner	1,717	34–11–2	70
48	April 28	Colorado	2–5	Vegas		Fleury	3,950	35–11–2	72
49	April 30	Vegas	0–3	Arizona		Lehner	5,111	35–12–2	72

May: 5–2–0 (Home: 2–1–0; Road: 3–1–0)
#	Date	Visitor	Score	Home	OT	Decision	Attendance	Record	Pts	Recap
50	May 1	Vegas	3–2	Arizona	OT	Fleury	5,671	36–12–2	74
51	May 3	Vegas	5–6	Minnesota		Lehner	3,000	36–13–2	74
52	May 5	Vegas	3–2	Minnesota	OT	Fleury	3,000	37–13–2	76
53	May 7	St. Louis	3–4	Vegas	OT	Lehner	7,567	38–13–2	78
54	May 8	St. Louis	1–4	Vegas		Fleury	7,567	39–13–2	80
55	May 10	Colorado	2–1	Vegas		Lehner	7,567	39–14–2	80
56	May 12	Vegas	6–0	San Jose		Fleury	1,654	40–14–2	82

Legend: Win (2 points) Loss (0 points) Overtime/shootout loss (1 point) Postponement

=== Playoffs ===
2021 Stanley Cup playoffs

West Division First Round vs. (W3) Minnesota Wild: Vegas won 4–3
#	Date	Visitor	Score	Home	OT	Decision	Attendance	Series	Recap
1	May 16	Minnesota	1–0	Vegas	OT	Fleury	8,683	0–1
2	May 18	Minnesota	1–3	Vegas		Fleury	8,683	1–1
3	May 20	Vegas	5–2	Minnesota		Fleury	4,500	2–1
4	May 22	Vegas	4–0	Minnesota		Fleury	4,500	3–1
5	May 24	Minnesota	4–2	Vegas		Fleury	12,156	3–2
6	May 26	Vegas	0–3	Minnesota		Fleury	4,500	3–3
7	May 28	Minnesota	2–6	Vegas		Fleury	12,156	4–3

West Division Second Round vs. (W1) Colorado Avalanche: Vegas won 4–2
#	Date	Visitor	Score	Home	OT	Decision	Attendance	Series	Recap
1	May 30	Vegas	1–7	Colorado		Lehner	10,489	0–1
2	June 2	Vegas	2–3	Colorado	OT	Fleury	10,491	0–2
3	June 4	Colorado	2–3	Vegas		Fleury	17,504	1–2
4	June 6	Colorado	1–5	Vegas		Fleury	18,081	2–2
5	June 8	Vegas	3–2	Colorado	OT	Fleury	10,495	3–2
6	June 10	Colorado	3–6	Vegas		Fleury	18,149	4–2

Stanley Cup Semifinals vs. (N4) Montreal Canadiens: Montreal won 4–2
#	Date	Visitor	Score	Home	OT	Decision	Attendance	Series	Recap
1	June 14	Montreal	1–4	Vegas		Fleury	17,884	1–0
2	June 16	Montreal	3–2	Vegas		Fleury	17,920	1–1
3	June 18	Vegas	2–3	Montreal	OT	Fleury	6,178	1–2
4	June 20	Vegas	2–1	Montreal	OT	Lehner	6,391	2–2
5	June 22	Montreal	4–1	Vegas		Fleury	17,969	2–3
6	June 24	Vegas	2–3	Montreal	OT	Lehner	6,603	2–4

Legend: Win Loss

== Player statistics ==
=== Skaters ===
Regular season
Player	GP	G	A	Pts	+/−	PIM
Mark Stone	55	21	40	61	+26	28
Max Pacioretty	48	24	27	51	+20	14
Jonathan Marchessault	55	18	26	44	+19	39
Shea Theodore	53	8	34	42	+28	14
William Karlsson	56	14	25	39	+19	4
Chandler Stephenson	51	14	21	35	+22	29
Alex Tuch	55	18	15	33	+16	28
Alec Martinez	53	9	23	32	+26	12
Reilly Smith	53	14	11	25	+10	18
Alex Pietrangelo	41	7	16	23	+20	16
Tomas Nosek	38	8	10	18	+7	10
Nicolas Hague	52	5	12	17	+14	31
William Carrier	52	6	9	15	0	16
Nicolas Roy	50	6	9	15	+9	14
Keegan Kolesar	44	3	9	12	−4	30
Zach Whitecloud	51	2	10	12	+9	24
Cody Glass	27	4	6	10	+6	8
Brayden McNabb	41	2	6	8	+10	16
Dylan Coghlan	29	3	3	6	−3	2
Mattias Janmark^{†}	15	1	4	5	+5	2
Ryan Reaves	37	1	4	5	0	27
Dylan Sikura	6	2	0	2	0	0
Nick Holden	17	0	2	2	+3	2
Peyton Krebs	4	0	1	1	+1	0
Tomas Jurco	8	0	1	1	0	0
Patrick Brown	4	0	0	0	0	2

Playoffs
Player	GP	G	A	Pts	+/−	PIM
William Karlsson	19	4	12	16	+10	2
Alex Pietrangelo	19	4	8	12	+8	18
Max Pacioretty	13	5	6	11	+6	4
Reilly Smith	19	3	7	10	+7	4
Shea Theodore	19	1	9	10	+7	10
Jonathan Marchessault	19	6	3	9	+8	12
Alex Tuch	19	4	5	9	+6	6
Nicolas Roy	19	4	5	9	−2	8
Mark Stone	19	5	3	8	+2	0
Mattias Janmark	16	4	4	8	+1	0
Nick Holden	15	2	5	7	+2	0
Alec Martinez	19	4	2	6	+1	9
Chandler Stephenson	16	0	6	6	+8	0
Brayden McNabb	13	1	3	4	+5	0
Zach Whitecloud	19	1	3	4	+3	16
Keegan Kolesar	17	1	3	4	−2	4
William Carrier	19	1	2	3	−1	8
Patrick Brown	12	2	0	2	−2	0
Nicolas Hague	10	1	1	2	+2	6
Tomas Nosek	6	0	1	1	−2	4
Ryan Reaves	12	0	1	1	+1	16
Dylan Sikura	2	0	0	0	0	0
Cody Glass	1	0	0	0	−1	0

=== Goaltenders ===
Regular season
Player	GP	GS	TOI	W	L	OT	GA	GAA	SA	SV%	SO	G	A	PIM
Marc-Andre Fleury	36	36	2,146:36	26	10	0	71	1.98	989	.928	6	0	1	2
Robin Lehner	19	19	1,155:19	13	4	2	44	2.29	505	.913	1	0	1	0
Oscar Dansk	1	1	61:25	1	0	0	4	3.91	29	.862	0	0	0	0
Logan Thompson	1	0	8:15	0	0	0	0	0.00	2	1.000	0	0	0	0

Playoffs
Player	GP	GS	TOI	W	L	GA	GAA	SA	SV%	SO	G	A	PIM
Marc-Andre Fleury	16	16	972:52	9	7	33	2.04	403	.918	1	0	1	0
Robin Lehner	3	3	182:27	1	2	11	3.62	97	.887	0	0	0	0

^{†}Denotes player spent time with another team before joining the Golden Knights. Stats reflect time with the Golden Knights only.
^{‡}Denotes player was traded mid-season. Stats reflect time with the Golden Knights only.
Bold/italics denotes franchise record.

== Transactions ==
The Golden Knights were involved in the following transactions during the 2020–21 season.

=== Trades ===
* Retained Salary Transaction: Each team is allowed up to three contracts on their payroll where they have retained salary in a trade (i.e. the player no longer plays with Team A due to a trade to Team B, but Team A still retains some salary). Only up to 50% of a player's contract can be kept, and only up to 15% of a team's salary cap can be taken up by retained salary. A contract can only be involved in one of these trades twice.

Date	Details		Ref
October 7, 2020	To Detroit Red Wings 4th-round pick in 2022	To Vegas Golden Knights 5th-round pick in 2020 (#125 overall)	
October 9, 2020	To Winnipeg Jets Paul Stastny	To Vegas Golden Knights Carl Dahlstrom conditional 4th-round pick in 2022	
October 12, 2020	To Vancouver Canucks Nate Schmidt	To Vegas Golden Knights 3rd-round pick in 2022	
April 12, 2021	To San Jose Sharks BUF 5th-round pick in 2022	To Vegas Golden Knights Mattias Janmark*	
April 12, 2021	To Chicago Blackhawks 2nd-round pick in 2021; 3rd-round pick in 2022	To Vegas Golden Knights Nick DeSimone; 5th-round pick in 2022	
July 17, 2021	To Nashville Predators Cody Glass	To Vegas Golden Knights Nolan Patrick (Note: From Philadelphia as part of a three-way trade)	
July 17, 2021	To New York Rangers Nick DeSimone; WPG 4th-round pick in 2022	To Vegas Golden Knights Brett Howden	

=== Players acquired ===
Date	Player	Former team	Term	Via	Ref
October 10, 2020	Tomas Jurco	Edmonton Oilers	1-year	Free agency	
October 11, 2020	Danny O'Regan	New York Rangers	1-year	Free agency	
October 12, 2020	Alex Pietrangelo	St. Louis Blues	7-year	Free agency	
March 16, 2021	Daniil Miromanov	HC Sochi (KHL)	1-year†‡	Free agency	
March 30, 2021	Zack Hayes	Henderson Silver Knights (AHL)	3-year†‡	Free agency	
Legend: † Contract is entry-level. ‡ Contract begins in 2021–22 season.

=== Players lost ===
Date	Player	New team	Term	Via	Ref
October 9, 2020	Jon Merrill	Detroit Red Wings	1-year	Free agency	
October 9, 2020	Nick Cousins	Nashville Predators	2-year	Free agency	
October 10, 2020	Curtis McKenzie	St. Louis Blues	1-year	Free agency	
November 2, 2020	Jaycob Megna	San Jose Barracuda (AHL)	1-year	Free agency	
December 1, 2020	Garret Sparks	Orlando Solar Bears (ECHL)	1-year	Free agency	
December 22, 2020	Deryk Engelland			Retirement	
February 10, 2021	Brett Lernout	Colorado Eagles (AHL)	Professional tryout	Free agency	
July 5, 2021	Oscar Dansk	HC Spartak Moscow (KHL)	2-year	Free agency	

=== Signings ===
Date	Player	Term	Ref
October 7, 2020	Chandler Stephenson	4-year	
October 7, 2020	Gage Quinney	1-year	
October 8, 2020	Reid Duke	1-year	
October 8, 2020	Jimmy Schuldt	1-year	
October 9, 2020	Tomas Nosek	1-year	
October 19, 2020	Keegan Kolesar	2-year	
December 31, 2020	Lukas Cormier	3-year†	
January 25, 2021	Pavel Dorofeyev	3-year†	
March 29, 2021	Peter DiLiberatore	3-year†	
March 30, 2021	Layton Ahac	3-year†‡	
April 7, 2021	Maxim Marushev	2-year†‡	
May 31, 2021	Mason Primeau	3-year†‡	
Legend: † Contract is entry-level. ‡ Contract begins in 2021–22 season.

== Draft picks ==
Below are the Vegas Golden Knights' selections at the 2020 NHL entry draft, which was originally scheduled for June 26–27, 2020, at the Bell Center in Montreal, Quebec, but was postponed on March 25, 2020, due to the COVID-19 pandemic. The draft was held virtually via video conference call on October 6–7, 2020, from the NHL Network studio in Secaucus, New Jersey.

Round	#	Player	Pos	Nationality	College/Junior/Club team (League)
1	29	Brendan Brisson	C	United States	Chicago Steel (USHL)
3	68	Lukas Cormier	D	Canada	Charlottetown Islanders (QMJHL)
3	91	Jackson Hallum	C	United States	St. Thomas Academy (Minnesota)
6	184	Noah Ellis	D	United States	Des Moines Buccaneers (USHL)
7	215	Maxim Marushev	C	Russia	Bars Kazan (VHL)
