= 2020–21 Colorado Avalanche season =

Season of play of professional ice hockey team

2020–21 Colorado Avalanche
- Presidents' Trophy winners
- West Division champions
- Division: 1st West
- 2020–21 record: 39–13–4
- Home record: 22–4–2
- Road record: 17–9–2
- Goals for: 197
- Goals against: 133

Team information
- General manager: Joe Sakic
- Coach: Jared Bednar
- Captain: Gabriel Landeskog
- Alternate captains: Erik Johnson; Nathan MacKinnon
- Arena: Ball Arena
- Minor league affiliates: Colorado Eagles (AHL); Utah Grizzlies (ECHL)

Team leaders
- Goals: Mikko Rantanen (30)
- Assists: Nathan MacKinnon (45)
- Points: Mikko Rantanen (66)
- Penalty minutes: Ryan Graves (55)
- Plus/minus: Mikko Rantanen (+30)
- Wins: Philipp Grubauer (30)
- Goals against average: Philipp Grubauer (1.95)

The 2020–21 Colorado Avalanche season was the 26th operational season and 25th playing season since the franchise relocated from Quebec prior to the start of the 1995–96 NHL season. As well as the franchise's 42nd season in the National Hockey League and 49th season overall. The Avalanche commemorated their 25th anniversary this season.

On December 20, 2020, the league temporarily realigned into four divisions with no conferences due to the COVID-19 pandemic and the ongoing closure of the Canada–United States border. As a result of this realignment, the Avalanche played this season in the West Division and only played against the other teams in their new division during the regular season and the first two rounds of the playoffs.

On April 22, the Avalanche clinched a playoff berth following a 4–2 win over the St. Louis Blues. They clinched their third Presidents' Trophy, as well as their tenth division championship, with a 5–1 victory over the Los Angeles Kings in their last game of the season on May 13. The Avalanche swept the St. Louis Blues in the First Round, with a 5–2 win in game four. In their Second Round series against the Vegas Golden Knights, the Avalanche initially led the series 2–0, but were later eliminated from the playoffs after they lost the next four games.

== Standings ==
=== Divisional standings ===
West Division
Pos	Team	GP	W	L	OTL	RW	GF	GA	GD	Pts
1	p – Colorado Avalanche	56	39	13	4	35	197	133	+64	82
2	x – Vegas Golden Knights	56	40	14	2	30	191	124	+67	82
3	x – Minnesota Wild	56	35	16	5	27	181	160	+21	75
4	x – St. Louis Blues	56	27	20	9	19	169	170	−1	63
5	Arizona Coyotes	56	24	26	6	19	153	176	−23	54
6	Los Angeles Kings	56	21	28	7	19	143	170	−27	49
7	San Jose Sharks	56	21	28	7	15	151	199	−48	49
8	Anaheim Ducks	56	17	30	9	11	126	179	−53	43

Source: National Hockey League
Rules for classification: 1) Fewer number of games played (GP, only during regular season); 2) Greater number of regulation wins (RW); 3) Greater number of wins in regulation and overtime, excluding shootout wins (ROW); 4) Greater number of total wins, including shootouts (W); 5) Greater number of points earned in head-to-head play; if teams played an uneven number of head-to-head games, the result of the first game on the home ice of the team with the extra home game is discarded; 6) Greater goal differential (GD); 7) Greater number of goals scored (GF)
p – Clinched Presidents' Trophy; x – Clinched playoff spot

== Schedule and results ==
=== Regular season ===
The regular season schedule was published on December 23, 2020.

2020–21 game log

January: 6–3–1 (Home: 3–1–0; Road: 3–2–1)
#	Date	Visitor	Score	Home	OT	Decision	Attendance	Record	Pts	Recap
1	January 13	St. Louis	4–1	Colorado		Grubauer	0	0–1–0	0
2	January 15	St. Louis	0–8	Colorado		Grubauer	0	1–1–0	2
3	January 19	Colorado	3–2	Los Angeles		Grubauer	0	2–1–0	4
4	January 21	Colorado	2–4	Los Angeles		Miska	0	2–2–0	4
5	January 22	Colorado	3–2	Anaheim	OT	Grubauer	0	3–2–0	6
6	January 24	Colorado	1–3	Anaheim		Grubauer	0	3–3–0	6
7	January 26	San Jose	3–7	Colorado		Grubauer	0	4–3–0	8
8	January 28	San Jose	0–3	Colorado		Grubauer	0	5–3–0	10
9	January 30	Colorado	5–1	Minnesota		Grubauer	0	6–3–0	12
10	January 31	Colorado	3–4	Minnesota	OT	Miska	0	6–3–1	13

February: 5–3–0 (Home: 2–2–0; Road: 3–1–0)
#	Date	Visitor	Score	Home	OT	Decision	Attendance	Record	Pts	Recap
11	February 2	Minnesota	1–2	Colorado		Grubauer	0	7–3–1	15
—	February 4	Minnesota	–	Colorado	Postponed due to COVID-19. Rescheduled for February 24.
—	February 6	Colorado	–	St. Louis	Postponed due to COVID-19. Rescheduled for April 14.
—	February 7	Colorado	–	St. Louis	Postponed due to COVID-19. Rescheduled for April 20.
—	February 9	Arizona	–	Colorado	Postponed due to COVID-19. Rescheduled for March 31.
—	February 11	Arizona	–	Colorado	Postponed due to COVID-19. Rescheduled for April 12.
12	February 14	Colorado	0–1	Vegas		Grubauer	0	7–4–1	15
13	February 16	Colorado	3–2	Vegas		Grubauer	0	8–4–1	17
14	February 20	Vegas	2–3	Colorado		Grubauer	0 (outdoors)	9–4–1	19
15	February 22	Vegas	3–0	Colorado		Grubauer	0	9–5–1	19
16	February 24	Minnesota	6–2	Colorado		Grubauer	0	9–6–1	19
17 (Note: The following games have been rescheduled: Colorado at Arizona originally scheduled for February 25, is now scheduled for February 26.; Anaheim at Colorado originally scheduled for March 31, is now scheduled for March 16.)	February 26	Colorado	3–2	Arizona		Miska	2,495	10–6–1	21
18	February 27	Colorado	6–2	Arizona		Grubauer	3,224	11–6–1	23

March: 12–2–3 (Home: 10–1–2; Road: 2–1–1)
#	Date	Visitor	Score	Home	OT	Decision	Attendance	Record	Pts	Recap
19	March 1	Colorado	2–6	San Jose		Grubauer	0	11–7–1	23
20	March 3	Colorado	4–0	San Jose		Grubauer	0	12–7–1	25
21	March 5	Anaheim	2–3	Colorado	OT	Grubauer	0	13–7–1	27
22	March 6	Anaheim	5–4	Colorado	OT	Miska	0	13–7–2	28
23	March 8	Arizona	3–2	Colorado		Grubauer	0	13–8–2	28
24	March 10	Arizona	1–2	Colorado	OT	Grubauer	0	14–8–2	30
25	March 12	Los Angeles	0–2	Colorado		Grubauer	0	15–8–2	32
26	March 14	Los Angeles	1–4	Colorado		Grubauer	0	16–8–2	34
27	March 16	Anaheim	4–8	Colorado		Grubauer	0	17–8–2	36
28	March 18	Minnesota	1–5	Colorado		Grubauer	0	18–8–2	38
29	March 20	Minnesota	0–6	Colorado		Grubauer	0	19–8–2	40
30	March 22	Colorado	5–1	Arizona		Grubauer	2,593	20–8–2	42
31	March 23	Colorado	4–5	Arizona	SO	Johansson	2,539	20–8–3	43
32	March 25	Vegas	1–5	Colorado		Grubauer	0	21–8–3	45
33	March 27	Vegas	3–2	Colorado	OT	Grubauer	0	21–8–4	46
34	March 29	Anaheim	2–5	Colorado		Grubauer	0	22–8–4	48
35	March 31	Arizona	3–9	Colorado		Grubauer	0	23–8–4	50

April: 9–4–0 (Home: 4–0–0; Road: 5–4–0)
#	Date	Visitor	Score	Home	OT	Decision	Attendance	Record	Pts	Recap
36 (Note: The following game has been rescheduled: St. Louis at Colorado originally scheduled for April 20, is now scheduled for April 2.)	April 2	St. Louis	2–3	Colorado		Johansson	4,039	24–8–4	52
37	April 3	St. Louis	1–2	Colorado		Grubauer	4,035	25–8–4	54
38	April 5	Colorado	5–4	Minnesota		Grubauer	3,000	26–8–4	56
39	April 7	Colorado	3–8	Minnesota		Grubauer	3,000	26–9–4	56
40	April 9	Colorado	2–0	Anaheim		Johansson	0	27–9–4	58
41	April 11	Colorado	4–1	Anaheim		Johansson	0	28–9–4	60
42	April 12	Arizona	2–4	Colorado		Grubauer	4,042	29–9–4	62
43	April 14	Colorado	4–3	St. Louis		Dubnyk	— (Note: Spectators were in attendance, but the exact number was not reported.)	30–9–4	64
—	April 16	Los Angeles	–	Colorado	Postponed due to COVID-19. Rescheduled for May 12.
—	April 18	Los Angeles	–	Colorado	Postponed due to COVID-19. Rescheduled for May 13.
—	April 20	Colorado	–	St. Louis	Postponed due to COVID-19. Rescheduled for April 26.
44	April 22	Colorado	4–2	St. Louis		Dubnyk	—	31–9–4	66
45	April 24	Colorado	3–5	St. Louis		Dubnyk	—	31–10–4	66
46	April 26	Colorado	1–4	St. Louis		Johansson	—	31–11–4	66
47	April 28	Colorado	2–5	Vegas		Dubnyk	3,950	31–12–4	66
48	April 30	San Jose	0–3	Colorado		Grubauer	4,045	32–12–4	68

May: 7–1–0 (Home: 4–0–0; Road: 3–1–0)
#	Date	Visitor	Score	Home	OT	Decision	Attendance	Record	Pts	Recap
49	May 1	San Jose	3–4	Colorado		Dubnyk	4,037	33–12–4	70
50	May 3	Colorado	5–4	San Jose	OT	Grubauer	1,071	34–12–4	72
51	May 5	Colorado	2–3	San Jose		Grubauer	1,041	34–13–4	72
52	May 7	Colorado	3–2	Los Angeles		Grubauer	2,115	35–13–4	74
53	May 8	Colorado	3–2	Los Angeles		Johansson	2,482	36–13–4	76
54 (Note: The following game has been rescheduled: Colorado at Vegas originally scheduled for April 26, is now scheduled for May 10.)	May 10	Colorado	2–1	Vegas		Grubauer	7,567	37–13–4	78
55	May 12	Los Angeles	0–6	Colorado		Grubauer	4,042	38–13–4	80
56	May 13	Los Angeles	1–5	Colorado		Johansson	4,045	39–13–4	82

Legend: Win (2 points) Loss (0 points) Overtime/shootout loss (1 point) Postponement

=== Playoffs ===
2021 Stanley Cup playoffs

West Division First Round vs. (W4) St. Louis Blues: Colorado won 4–0
#	Date	Visitor	Score	Home	OT	Decision	Attendance	Series	Recap
1	May 17	St. Louis	1–4	Colorado		Grubauer	7,741	1–0
2	May 19	St. Louis	3–6	Colorado		Grubauer	7,739	2–0
3	May 21	Colorado	5–1	St. Louis		Grubauer	9,000	3–0
4	May 23	Colorado	5–2	St. Louis		Grubauer	9,000	4–0

West Division Second Round vs. (W2) Vegas Golden Knights: Vegas won 4–2
#	Date	Visitor	Score	Home	OT	Decision	Attendance	Series	Recap
1	May 30	Vegas	1–7	Colorado		Grubauer	10,489	1–0
2	June 2	Vegas	2–3	Colorado	OT	Grubauer	10,491	2–0
3	June 4	Colorado	2–3	Vegas		Grubauer	17,504	2–1
4	June 6	Colorado	1–5	Vegas		Grubauer	18,081	2–2
5	June 8	Vegas	3–2	Colorado	OT	Grubauer	10,495	2–3
6	June 10	Colorado	3–6	Vegas		Grubauer	18,149	2–4

Legend: Win Loss

== Player statistics ==
Final stats

Skaters

Regular season
Player	GP	G	A	Pts	+/–	PIM
Mikko Rantanen	52	30	36	66	+30	34
Nathan MacKinnon	48	20	45	65	+22	37
Gabriel Landeskog	54	20	32	52	+14	34
Andre Burakovsky	53	19	25	44	+4	10
Cale Makar	44	8	36	44	+17	12
Nazem Kadri	56	11	21	32	−7	34
Sam Girard	48	5	27	32	+15	16
Joonas Donskoi	51	17	14	31	+14	10
Devon Toews	53	9	22	31	+29	16
Brandon Saad	44	15	9	24	+1	12
Valeri Nichushkin	55	10	11	21	+9	4
J. T. Compher	48	10	8	18	+10	19
Tyson Jost	54	7	10	17	+14	24
Ryan Graves	54	2	13	15	+15	55
Pierre-Edouard Bellemare	53	9	2	11	+6	21
Jacob MacDonald	33	1	8	9	+14	8
Conor Timmins	31	0	7	7	+6	8
Logan O'Connor	22	3	2	5	+6	6
Matt Calvert	18	0	3	3	−2	6
Dan Renouf	18	0	3	3	−1	16
Kiefer Sherwood	15	0	3	3	+2	0
Liam O'Brien	12	0	3	3	+1	40
Alex Newhook	6	0	3	3	+5	2
Patrik Nemeth^{†}	13	1	1	2	+6	6
Bowen Byram	19	0	2	2	+1	23
Carl Soderberg^{†}	11	0	2	2	0	4
Jayson Megna	7	0	2	2	+2	0
Kyle Burroughs	5	0	1	1	+1	5
Erik Johnson	4	0	1	1	+2	2
Greg Pateryn^{†‡}	8	0	0	0	−2	4
Martin Kaut	5	0	0	0	−1	4
Dennis Gilbert	3	0	0	0	0	5
Sheldon Dries	3	0	0	0	+1	4
Keaton Middleton	3	0	0	0	−1	4
Ian Cole^{‡}	2	0	0	0	0	0

Playoffs
Player	GP	G	A	Pts	+/−	PIM
Nathan MacKinnon	10	8	7	15	+6	2
Mikko Rantanen	10	5	8	13	+5	4
Gabriel Landeskog	10	4	9	13	+1	9
Cale Makar	10	2	8	10	0	2
Brandon Saad	10	7	1	8	+3	12
Ryan Graves	10	1	5	6	+5	10
Devon Toews	10	1	5	6	+10	2
Joonas Donskoi	10	3	2	5	−1	0
Sam Girard	10	0	5	5	−5	2
Tyson Jost	10	2	2	4	−3	4
Andre Burakovsky	10	1	3	4	−1	4
Valeri Nichushkin	10	1	2	3	−3	10
Pierre-Edouard Bellemare	10	0	3	3	+1	0
J. T. Compher	10	1	1	2	+2	4
Alex Newhook	8	1	1	2	0	2
Carl Soderberg	4	1	1	2	−1	2
Patrik Nemeth	10	0	1	1	+1	6
Nazem Kadri	2	0	1	1	−1	10
Kiefer Sherwood	2	0	1	1	0	0
Conor Timmins	10	0	0	0	−2	0
Sampo Ranta	2	0	0	0	−1	0
Logan O'Connor	2	0	0	0	−3	0

Goaltenders

Regular season
Player	GP	GS	TOI	W	L	OT	GA	GAA	SA	SV%	SO	G	A	PIM
Philipp Grubauer	40	39	2366:07	30	9	1	77	1.95	993	.922	7	0	0	0
Jonas Johansson^{†}	8	7	436:57	5	1	1	15	2.06	173	.913	1	0	0	0
Devan Dubnyk^{†}	5	5	294:38	3	2	0	16	3.26	140	.886	0	0	0	0
Hunter Miska	5	5	259:48	1	1	2	18	4.16	111	.838	0	0	0	0

Playoffs
Player	GP	GS	TOI	W	L	GA	GAA	SA	SV%	SO	G	A	PIM
Philipp Grubauer	10	10	597:54	6	4	26	2.61	301	.914	0	0	1	0

^{†}Denotes player spent time with another team before joining the Avalanche. Stats reflect time with the Avalanche only.
^{‡}Denotes player was traded mid-season. Stats reflect time with the Avalanche only.
Bold/italics denotes franchise record.

== Transactions ==
The Avalanche have been involved in the following transactions during the 2020–21 season

=== Trades ===
Date	Details		Ref
October 9, 2020	To Chicago Blackhawks Nikita Zadorov; Anton Lindholm	To Colorado Avalanche Brandon Saad; Dennis Gilbert	
October 10, 2020	To New York Islanders A. J. Greer	To Colorado Avalanche Kyle Burroughs	
October 11, 2020	To New York Islanders 2nd-round pick in 2021; 2nd-round pick in 2022	To Colorado Avalanche Devon Toews	
January 19, 2021	To Minnesota Wild Ian Cole	To Colorado Avalanche Greg Pateryn	
March 20, 2021	To Buffalo Sabres 6th-round pick in 2021	To Colorado Avalanche Jonas Johansson	
April 9, 2021	To Detroit Red Wings 4th-round pick in 2022	To Colorado Avalanche Patrik Nemeth	
April 10, 2021	To San Jose Sharks Greg Pateryn; 5th-round pick in 2021	To Colorado Avalanche Devan Dubnyk	

=== Free agents ===
Date	Player	Team	Contract term	Ref
September 1, 2020	Vladislav Kamenev	to SKA Saint Petersburg (KHL)	2-year	
September 10, 2020	Mark Barberio	to Lausanne HC (NL)	3-year	
October 9, 2020	Miikka Salomaki	from Toronto Maple Leafs	1-year	
October 9, 2020	Kiefer Sherwood	from Anaheim Ducks	1-year	
October 9, 2020	Mike Vecchione	from St. Louis Blues	1-year	
October 10, 2020	Mark Alt	to Los Angeles Kings	1-year	
October 11, 2020	Vladislav Namestnikov	to Detroit Red Wings	2-year	
October 13, 2020	Matt Nieto	to San Jose Sharks	1-year	
October 22, 2020	Antoine Bibeau	to Carolina Hurricanes	1-year	
October 30, 2020	Michael Hutchinson	to Toronto Maple Leafs	2-year	
January 14, 2021	Kevin Connauton	to Florida Panthers	1-year	

=== Retirement ===
Date	Player	Ref
January 4, 2021	Colin Wilson	

=== Signings ===
Date	Player	Contract term	Ref
September 18, 2020	Logan O'Connor	2-year	
October 9, 2020	Sheldon Dries	1-year	
October 10, 2020	Andre Burakovsky	2-year	
October 10, 2020	Valeri Nichushkin	2-year	
October 11, 2020	Jayson Megna	1-year	
October 12, 2020	Ryan Graves	3-year	
October 19, 2020	Tyson Jost	1-year	
October 19, 2020	Hunter Miska	2-year	
October 27, 2020	Devon Toews	4-year	
October 30, 2020	Kyle Burroughs	1-year	
March 31, 2021	Alex Newhook	3-year	

== Draft picks ==
Below are the Colorado Avalanches' selection at the 2020 NHL Draft that was held on October 6–7 at NHL Network Studios.

Round	#	Player	Pos	Nationality	College/Junior/Club team (league)
1	25	Justin Barron	D	Canada	Halifax Mooseheads (QMJHL)
3	75	Jean-Luc Foudy	C	Canada	Windsor Spitfires (OHL)
4	118	Colby Ambrosio	C	Canada	Tri-City Storm (USHL)
5	139	Ryder Rolston	RW	United States	Waterloo Blackhawks (USHL)
6	167	Nils Aman	C	Sweden	New Hampshire Wildcats (H-East)
