= 2020–21 Anaheim Ducks season =

Anaheim Ducks season

2020–21 Anaheim Ducks
- Division: 8th West
- 2020–21 record: 17–30–9
- Home record: 6–18–4
- Road record: 11–12–5
- Goals for: 126
- Goals against: 179

Team information
- General manager: Bob Murray
- Coach: Dallas Eakins
- Captain: Ryan Getzlaf
- Alternate captains: Ryan Kesler; Josh Manson; Jakob Silfverberg
- Arena: Honda Center
- Minor league affiliates: San Diego Gulls (AHL); Tulsa Oilers (ECHL)

Team leaders
- Goals: Max Comtois (16)
- Assists: Rickard Rakell (19)
- Points: Max Comtois (33)
- Penalty minutes: Nicolas Deslauriers (53)
- Plus/minus: Trevor Zegras (+6)
- Wins: John Gibson (9)
- Goals against average: Anthony Stolarz (2.20)

The 2020–21 Anaheim Ducks season was the 28th season for the National Hockey League (NHL) franchise that was established on June 15, 1993.

On December 20, 2020, the league temporarily realigned into four divisions with no conferences due to the COVID-19 pandemic and the ongoing closure of the Canada–United States border. As a result of this realignment, the Ducks played this season in the West Division and only played games against the other teams in their new division during the regular season.

On April 29, the Ducks were eliminated from playoff contention after the St. Louis Blues defeated the Minnesota Wild. They finished last in their division for the first time since the 2011-12 season.

Following offensive woes the whole season, Anaheim finished with the worst single-season power play in NHL history, at 8.94%.

== Standings ==
=== Divisional standings ===
West Division
Pos	Team	GP	W	L	OTL	RW	GF	GA	GD	Pts
1	p – Colorado Avalanche	56	39	13	4	35	197	133	+64	82
2	x – Vegas Golden Knights	56	40	14	2	30	191	124	+67	82
3	x – Minnesota Wild	56	35	16	5	27	181	160	+21	75
4	x – St. Louis Blues	56	27	20	9	19	169	170	−1	63
5	Arizona Coyotes	56	24	26	6	19	153	176	−23	54
6	Los Angeles Kings	56	21	28	7	19	143	170	−27	49
7	San Jose Sharks	56	21	28	7	15	151	199	−48	49
8	Anaheim Ducks	56	17	30	9	11	126	179	−53	43

Source: National Hockey League
Rules for classification: 1) Fewer number of games played (GP, only during regular season); 2) Greater number of regulation wins (RW); 3) Greater number of wins in regulation and overtime, excluding shootout wins (ROW); 4) Greater number of total wins, including shootouts (W); 5) Greater number of points earned in head-to-head play; if teams played an uneven number of head-to-head games, the result of the first game on the home ice of the team with the extra home game is discarded; 6) Greater goal differential (GD); 7) Greater number of goals scored (GF)
p – Clinched Presidents' Trophy; x – Clinched playoff spot

== Schedule and results ==
=== Regular season ===
The regular season schedule was published on December 23, 2020.

2020–21 game log

January: 3–5–2 (Home: 2–3–1; Road: 1–2–1)
#	Date	Visitor	Score	Home	OT	Decision	Attendance	Record	Pts	Recap
1	January 14	Anaheim	2–5	Vegas		Gibson	0	0–1–0	0
2	January 16	Anaheim	1–2	Vegas	OT	Gibson	0	0–1–1	1
3	January 18	Minnesota	0–1	Anaheim		Gibson	0	1–1–1	3
4	January 20	Minnesota	3–2	Anaheim		Miller	0	1–2–1	3
5	January 22	Colorado	3–2	Anaheim	OT	Gibson	0	1–2–2	4
6	January 24	Colorado	1–3	Anaheim		Gibson	0	2–2–2	6
7	January 26	Anaheim	1–0	Arizona		Gibson	1,808	3–2–2	8
8	January 28	Anaheim	2–3	Arizona		Gibson	2,252	3–3–2	8
9	January 30	St. Louis	6–1	Anaheim		Gibson	0	3–4–2	8
10	January 31	St. Louis	4–1	Anaheim		Gibson	0	3–5–2	8

February: 3–5–3 (Home: 1–2–2; Road: 2–3–1)
#	Date	Visitor	Score	Home	OT	Decision	Attendance	Record	Pts	Recap
11	February 2	Anaheim	3–1	Los Angeles		Gibson	0	4–5–2	10
12	February 5	San Jose	5–4	Anaheim	SO	Gibson	0	4–5–3	11
13	February 6	San Jose	1–2	Anaheim	SO	Miller	0	5–5–3	13
14	February 9	Anaheim	4–5	Vegas		Miller	0	5–6–3	13
15	February 11	Anaheim	1–0	Vegas		Gibson	0	6–6–3	15
16	February 15	Anaheim	2–3	San Jose		Gibson	0	6–7–3	15
17	February 18	Minnesota	3–1	Anaheim		Gibson	0	6–8–3	15
18	February 20	Minnesota	5–1	Anaheim		Gibson	0	6–9–3	15
19	February 22	Anaheim	3–4	Arizona		Gibson	2,346	6–10–3	15
20	February 24	Anaheim	3–4	Arizona	SO	Miller	2,319	6–10–4	16
21	February 27	Vegas	3–2	Anaheim	OT	Gibson	0	6–10–5	17

March: 5–10–1 (Home: 2–6–0; Road: 3–4–1)
#	Date	Visitor	Score	Home	OT	Decision	Attendance	Record	Pts	Recap
22	March 1	St. Louis	5–4	Anaheim		Gibson	0	6–11–5	17
23	March 3	St. Louis	3–2	Anaheim		Gibson	0	6–12–5	17
24	March 5	Anaheim	2–3	Colorado	OT	Gibson	0	6–12–6	18
25	March 6	Anaheim	5–4	Colorado	OT	Miller	0	7–12–6	20
26	March 8	Los Angeles	5–6	Anaheim	OT	Gibson	0	8–12–6	22
27	March 10	Los Angeles	5–1	Anaheim		Gibson	0	8–13–6	22
28	March 12	San Jose	6–0	Anaheim		Gibson	0	8–14–6	22
29	March 13	San Jose	3–1	Anaheim		Miller	0	8–15–6	22
30	March 16	Anaheim	4–8	Colorado		Miller	0	8–16–6	22
31	March 18	Arizona	2–3	Anaheim	OT	Miller	0	9–16–6	24
32	March 20	Arizona	5–1	Anaheim		Miller	0	9–17–6	24
33	March 22	Anaheim	1–2	Minnesota		Miller	0	9–18–6	24
34	March 24	Anaheim	2–3	Minnesota		Miller	0	9–19–6	24
35	March 26	Anaheim	4–1	St. Louis		Gibson	— (Note: Spectators were in attendance, but the exact number was not reported.)	10–19–6	26
36	March 28	Anaheim	3–2	St. Louis	OT	Stolarz	—	11–19–6	28
37	March 29	Anaheim	2–5	Colorado		Miller	0	11–20–6	28

April: 4–9–1 (Home: 0–7–1; Road: 4–2–0)
#	Date	Visitor	Score	Home	OT	Decision	Attendance	Record	Pts	Recap
38	April 2	Arizona	4–2	Anaheim		Stolarz	0	11–21–6	28
39	April 4	Arizona	3–2	Anaheim	OT	Gibson	0	11–21–7	29
40	April 6	Anaheim	5–1	San Jose		Gibson	0	12–21–7	31
41	April 9	Colorado	2–0	Anaheim		Gibson	0	12–22–7	31
42	April 11	Colorado	4–1	Anaheim		Gibson	0	12–23–7	31
43	April 12	Anaheim	4–0	San Jose		Stolarz	0	13–23–7	33
44	April 14	Anaheim	4–1	San Jose		Stolarz	0	14–23–7	35
45	April 16	Vegas	4–0	Anaheim		Gibson	1,717	14–24–7	35
46	April 18	Vegas	5–2	Anaheim		Gibson	1,717	14–25–7	35
47	April 20	Anaheim	1–4	Los Angeles		Stolarz	1,431	14–26–7	35
48	April 24	Vegas	5–1	Anaheim		Gibson	1,717	14–27–7	35
49	April 26	Anaheim	1–4	Los Angeles		Stolarz	1,373	14–28–7	35
50	April 28	Anaheim	3–2	Los Angeles		Gibson	1,763	15–28–7	37
51	April 30	Los Angeles	2–1	Anaheim		Gibson	1,717	15–29–7	37

May: 2–1–2 (Home: 1–0–0; Road: 1–1–2)
#	Date	Visitor	Score	Home	OT	Decision	Attendance	Record	Pts	Recap
52	May 1	Los Angeles	2–6	Anaheim		Miller	1,717	16–29–7	39
53	May 3	Anaheim	1–3	St. Louis		Gibson	—	16–30–7	39
54	May 5	Anaheim	3–2	St. Louis	SO	Stolarz	—	17–30–7	41
55	May 7	Anaheim	3–4	Minnesota	OT	Gibson	3,000	17–30–8	42
56	May 8	Anaheim	3–4	Minnesota	OT	Miller	3,300	17–30–9	43

Legend: Win (2 points) Loss (0 points) Overtime/shootout loss (1 point)

== Transactions ==
The Ducks have been involved in the following transactions during the 2020–21 season.

=== Free agents ===
Date	Player	New team	Previous team	Ref
October 9, 2020	Derek Grant	Anaheim Ducks	Philadelphia Flyers	
October 9, 2020	Kevin Shattenkirk	Anaheim Ducks	Tampa Bay Lightning	
October 9, 2020	Matt Irwin	Buffalo Sabres	Anaheim Ducks	
October 9, 2020	Kevin Boyle	Detroit Red Wings	Anaheim Ducks	
October 9, 2020	Kyle Criscuolo	Detroit Red Wings	Anaheim Ducks	
October 9, 2020	Vinni Lettieri	Anaheim Ducks	New York Rangers	
October 9, 2020	Andy Welinski	Anaheim Ducks	Philadelphia Flyers	
October 10, 2020	Kiefer Sherwood	Colorado Avalanche	Anaheim Ducks	

=== Imports ===
This section is for players who were not previously on contract with NHL teams in the past season. Listed is the last team and league they were under contract with.

Date	Player	New team	Previous team	League	Ref
November 6, 2020	Jacob Perreault	Anaheim Ducks	Sarnia Sting	OHL	
November 7, 2020	Jamie Drysdale	Anaheim Ducks	Erie Otters	OHL	
October 11, 2020	Maxim Golod	Anaheim Ducks	Erie Otters	OHL	

== Trades ==
- Retained salary transaction: Each team is allowed up to three contracts on their payroll where they have retained salary in a trade (i.e. the player no longer plays with Team A due to a trade to Team B, but Team A still retains some salary). Only up to 50% of a player's contract can be kept, and only up to 15% of a team's salary cap can be taken up by retained salary. A contract can only be involved in one of these trades twice.

Hover over-retained salary or conditional transactions for more information.

=== October ===
October 7, 2020	To Anaheim Ducks 7th-round pick in 2020 (#207 overall)	To Columbus Blue Jackets 7th-round pick in 2022
October 8, 2020	To Anaheim Ducks EDM 5th-round pick in 2021	To Ottawa Senators Erik Gudbranson

== Draft picks ==
Below are the Anaheim Ducks' selections at the 2020 NHL entry draft, which was originally scheduled for June 26-27, 2020 at the Bell Center in Montreal, Quebec, but was postponed on March 25, 2020, due to the COVID-19 pandemic. On October 6-7, 2020 the draft was held virtually via Video conference call from the NHL Network studio in Secaucus, New Jersey.

Round	#	Player	Pos	Nationality	College/Junior/Club team (League)
1	6	Jamie Drysdale	D	Canada	Erie Otters (OHL)
1	27^{1}	Jacob Perreault	RW	Canada	Sarnia Sting (OHL)
2	36	Sam Colangelo	RW	United States	Chicago Steel (USHL)
3	67	Ian Moore	D	United States	St. Mark's School (USHS-Prep)
4	104^{2}	Thimo Nickl	D	Austria	Drummondville Voltigeurs (QMJHL)
5	129	Artyom Galimov	C	Russia	Ak Bars Kazan (KHL)
6	160	Albin Sundsvik	C	Sweden	Skellefteå AIK (SHL)
7	207^{3}	Ethan Bowen	C	Canada	Chilliwack Chiefs (BCHL)

=== Notes ===
1. The Boston Bruins' first-round pick went to the Anaheim Ducks as the result of a trade on February 21, 2020, that sent Ondrej Kase to Boston in exchange for David Backes, Axel Andersson and this pick.
2. The Nashville Predators' fourth-round pick went to the Anaheim Ducks as the result of a trade on February 24, 2020, that sent Derek Grant to Philadelphia in exchange for Kyle Criscuolo and this pick (being conditional at the time of the trade). The condition – Anaheim will receive the higher of Nashville or Philadelphia's fourth-round pick in 2020. – was converted when Nashville was eliminated from the 2020 Stanley Cup playoffs on August 7, 2020, ensuring that Nashville would select higher than Philadelphia.
3. The Columbus Blue Jackets' seventh-round pick went to the Anaheim Ducks as the result of a trade on October 7, 2020, that sent a conditional seventh-round pick in 2022 or 2023 to Columbus in exchange for this pick.
