= List of Minnesota Wild seasons =

The Minnesota Wild are a professional ice hockey team based in Saint Paul, Minnesota. The team is a member of the Central Division of the Western Conference of the National Hockey League (NHL).

== Table key ==
Key of colors and symbols
Color/symbol	Explanation
†	Stanley Cup champions
‡	Conference champions
↑	Division champions
#	Led league in points

Key of terms and abbreviations
Term or abbreviation	Definition
Finish	Final position in division or league standings
GP	Number of games played
W	Number of wins
L	Number of losses
T	Number of ties
OT	Number of losses in overtime (since the 1999–2000 season)
Pts	Number of points
GF	Goals for (goals scored by the Wild)
GA	Goals against (goals scored by the Wild's opponents)
—	Does not apply

== Year by year ==
Season	Wild season	Conference	Division	Regular season									Postseason					
Season	Wild season	Conference	Division	Finish	GP	W	L	T	OT	Pts	GF	GA	GP	W	L	GF	GA	Result
2000–01	2000–01	Western	Northwest	5th	82	25	39	13	5	68	168	210	Did not qualify					
2001–02	2001–02	Western	Northwest	5th	82	26	35	12	9	73	195	238	Did not qualify					
2002–03	2002–03	Western	Northwest	3rd	82	42	29	10	1	95	198	178	18	8	10	43	43	Won in conference quarterfinals, 4–3 (Avalanche); Won in conference semifinals, 4–3 (Canucks); Lost in conference finals, 0–4 (Mighty Ducks)
2003–04	2003–04	Western	Northwest	5th	82	30	29	20	3	83	188	183	Did not qualify					
2004–05^{1}	2004–05	Season cancelled due to 2004–05 NHL lockout																
2005–06^{2}	2005–06	Western	Northwest	5th	82	38	36	—	8	84	231	215	Did not qualify					
2006–07	2006–07	Western	Northwest	2nd	82	48	26	—	8	104	235	191	5	1	4	9	12	Lost in conference quarterfinals, 1–4 (Ducks)
2007–08	2007–08	Western	Northwest↑	1st	82	44	28	—	10	98	223	218	6	2	4	12	17	Lost in conference quarterfinals, 2–4 (Avalanche)
2008–09	2008–09	Western	Northwest	3rd	82	40	33	—	9	89	219	200	Did not qualify					
2009–10	2009–10	Western	Northwest	4th	82	38	36	—	8	84	219	246	Did not qualify					
2010–11	2010–11	Western	Northwest	3rd	82	39	35	—	8	86	206	223	Did not qualify					
2011–12	2011–12	Western	Northwest	4th	82	35	36	—	11	81	177	226	Did not qualify					
2012–13^{3}	2012–13	Western	Northwest	2nd	48	26	19	—	3	55	122	127	5	1	4	7	17	Lost in conference quarterfinals, 1–4 (Blackhawks)
2013–14	2013–14	Western	Central	4th	82	43	27	—	12	98	207	206	13	6	7	35	35	Won in first round, 4–3 (Avalanche); Lost in second round, 2–4 (Blackhawks)
2014–15	2014–15	Western	Central	4th	82	46	28	—	8	100	231	201	10	4	6	24	27	Won in first round, 4–2 (Blues); Lost in second round, 0–4 (Blackhawks)
2015–16	2015–16	Western	Central	5th	82	38	33	—	11	87	216	206	6	2	4	17	21	Lost in first round, 2–4 (Stars)
2016–17	2016–17	Western	Central	2nd	82	49	25	—	8	106	266	208	5	1	4	8	11	Lost in first round, 1–4 (Blues)
2017–18	2017–18	Western	Central	3rd	82	45	26	—	11	101	253	232	5	1	4	9	16	Lost in first round, 1–4 (Jets)
2018–19	2018–19	Western	Central	7th	82	37	36	—	9	83	211	237	Did not qualify					
2019–20^{4}	2019–20	Western	Central	6th	69	35	27	—	7	77	220	220	4	1	3	10	12	Lost in qualifying round, 1–3 (Canucks)
2020–21^{5}	2020–21	—	West	3rd	56	35	16	—	5	75	181	160	7	3	4	13	20	Lost in first round, 3–4 (Golden Knights)
2021–22	2021–22	Western	Central	2nd	82	53	22	—	7	113	310	253	6	2	4	16	22	Lost in first round, 2–4 (Blues)
2022–23	2022–23	Western	Central	3rd	82	46	25	—	11	103	246	225	6	2	4	14	21	Lost in first round, 2–4 (Stars)
2023–24	2023–24	Western	Central	6th	82	39	34	—	9	87	251	263	Did not qualify					
2024–25	2024–25	Western	Central	4th	82	45	30	—	7	97	228	239	6	2	4	19	18	Lost in first round, 2–4 (Golden Knights)
2025–26	2025–26	Western	Central	3rd	82	46	24	—	12	104	272	240	11	5	6	41	39	Won in first round, 4–2 (Stars); Lost in second round, 1–4 (Avalanche)
Totals					1,895	942	710	55	188	2,127	5,201	5,115	107	37	70	254	316	15 playoff appearances

^{1} Season was cancelled due to the 2004–05 NHL lockout.
^{2} As of the 2005–06 NHL season, all games tied after regulation will be decided in a shootout; SOL (Shootout losses) will be recorded as OTL in the standings.
^{3} The 2012–13 NHL season was shortened due to the 2012–13 NHL lockout.
^{4} The 2019–20 NHL season was suspended on March 12, 2020 due to the COVID-19 pandemic.
^{5} Due to the COVID-19 pandemic, the 2020–21 NHL season was shortened to 56 games.

=== All-time records ===
Statistic	GP	W	L	T	OT
Regular season record (2000–present)	1,977	988	734	55	200
Postseason record (2000–present)	108	40	68	—	—
All-time regular and postseason record	2,085	1,028	802	55	200
All-time series record: 5–14
