= List of Arizona Coyotes seasons =

This is a list of seasons completed by the Arizona Coyotes of the National Hockey League (NHL). This list documents the records and playoff results for all seasons the Coyotes completed in the NHL since joining as an expansion team in 1996 as the Phoenix Coyotes, up to when they suspended operations following the 2023–24 season.

In 27 completed seasons (2004–05 season was not played due to lockout), the Coyotes made the playoffs nine times and won a division title once.

== Table key ==
Key of colors and symbols
Color/symbol	Explanation
†	Stanley Cup champions
‡	Conference champions
↑	Division champions
#	Led league in points

Key of terms and abbreviations
Term or abbreviation	Definition
Finish	Final position in division or league standings
GP	Number of games played
W	Number of wins
L	Number of losses
T	Number of ties
OT	Number of losses in overtime (since the 1999–2000 season)
Pts	Number of points
GF	Goals for (goals scored by the Coyotes)
GA	Goals against (goals scored by the Coyotes' opponents)
—	Does not apply

== Year by year ==
Season	Coyotes season	Conference	Division	Regular season (Note: Code explanation; GP—Games played, W—Wins, L—Losses, OT—Overtime/shootout losses, GF—Goals for, GA—Goals against, Pts—Points)									Postseason< (Note: The result of the playoff series shows the Coyotes' result first regardless of the outcome, followed by the opposing team in parentheses.)					
Season	Coyotes season	Conference	Division	Finish	GP	W	L	T (Note: Beginning in 2005, all games have a winner. Ties were eliminated.)	OT (Note: Beginning in 1999, overtime (and later shootout) losses are worth one point.)	Pts	GF	GA	GP	W	L	GF	GA	Result
Phoenix Coyotes
1996–97	1996–97	Western	Central	3rd	82	38	37	7	—	83	240	243	7	3	4	17	17	Lost in conference quarterfinals (Mighty Ducks), 3–4
1997–98	1997–98	Western	Central	4th	82	35	35	12	—	82	224	227	6	2	4	18	24	Lost in conference quarterfinals (Red Wings), 2–4
1998–99	1998–99	Western	Pacific	2nd	82	39	31	12	—	90	205	197	7	3	4	16	19	Lost in conference quarterfinals (Blues), 3–4
1999–00	1999–00	Western	Pacific	3rd	82	39	31	8	4	90	232	228	5	1	4	10	17	Lost in conference quarterfinals (Avalanche), 1–4
2000–01	2000–01	Western	Pacific	4th	82	35	27	17	3	90	214	212	—	—	—	—	—	Did not qualify
2001–02	2001–02	Western	Pacific	2nd	82	40	27	9	6	95	228	210	5	1	4	7	13	Lost in conference quarterfinals (Sharks), 1–4
2002–03	2002–03	Western	Pacific	4th	82	31	35	11	5	78	204	230	—	—	—	—	—	Did not qualify
2003–04	2003–04	Western	Pacific	5th	82	22	36	18	6	68	188	245	—	—	—	—	—	Did not qualify
2004–05 (Note: Season was canceled due to the 2004–05 NHL lockout.)	2004–05	Season canceled due to 2004–05 NHL lockout																
2005–06 (Note: As of the 2005–06 NHL season, all games tied after regulation will be decided in a shootout; SOL (Shootout losses) will be recorded as OTL in the standings.)	2005–06	Western	Pacific	5th	82	38	39	—	5	81	246	271	—	—	—	—	—	Did not qualify
2006–07	2006–07	Western	Pacific	5th	82	31	46	—	5	67	216	284	—	—	—	—	—	Did not qualify
2007–08	2007–08	Western	Pacific	4th	82	38	37	—	7	83	214	231	—	—	—	—	—	Did not qualify
2008–09	2008–09	Western	Pacific	4th	82	36	39	—	7	79	208	252	—	—	—	—	—	Did not qualify
2009–10	2009–10	Western	Pacific	2nd	82	50	25	—	7	107	225	202	7	3	4	18	26	Lost in conference quarterfinals (Red Wings), 3–4
2010–11	2010–11	Western	Pacific	3rd	82	43	26	—	13	99	231	226	4	0	4	10	18	Lost in conference quarterfinals (Red Wings), 0–4
2011–12	2011–12	Western	Pacific↑	1st	82	42	27	—	13	97	216	204	16	9	7	37	35	Won in conference quarterfinals (Blackhawks), 4–2; Won in conference semifinals (Predators), 4–1; Lost in conference finals (Kings), 1–4
2012–13 (Note: The 2012–13 NHL season was shortened due to the 2012–13 NHL lockout.)	2012–13	Western	Pacific	4th	48	21	18	—	9	51	125	131	—	—	—	—	—	Did not qualify
2013–14	2013–14	Western	Pacific	4th	82	37	30	—	15	89	216	231	—	—	—	—	—	Did not qualify
Arizona Coyotes
2014–15	2014–15	Western	Pacific	7th	82	24	50	—	8	56	170	272	—	—	—	—	—	Did not qualify
2015–16	2015–16	Western	Pacific	4th	82	35	39	—	8	78	209	245	—	—	—	—	—	Did not qualify
2016–17	2016–17	Western	Pacific	6th	82	30	42	—	10	70	197	260	—	—	—	—	—	Did not qualify
2017–18	2017–18	Western	Pacific	8th	82	29	41	—	12	70	208	256	—	—	—	—	—	Did not qualify
2018–19	2018–19	Western	Pacific	4th	82	39	35	—	8	86	213	223	—	—	—	—	—	Did not qualify
2019–20 (Note: The 2019–20 NHL season was suspended on March 12, 2020, due to the COVID-19 pandemic.)	2019–20	Western	Pacific	5th	70	33	29	—	8	74	195	185	9	4	5	22	33	Won in qualifying round (Predators), 3–1; Lost in first round (Avalanche), 1–4
2020–21 (Note: The 2020–21 NHL season was shortened due to the COVID-19 pandemic.)	2020–21	—	West	5th	56	24	26	—	6	54	153	176	—	—	—	—	—	Did not qualify
2021–22	2021–22	Western	Central	8th	82	25	50	—	7	57	207	313	—	—	—	—	—	Did not qualify
2022–23	2022–23	Western	Central	7th	82	28	40	—	14	70	228	299	—	—	—	—	—	Did not qualify
2023–24	2023–24	Western	Central	7th	82	36	41	—	5	77	256	274	—	—	—	—	—	Did not qualify
Suspended operations (Note: Due to ongoing arena issues in the Phoenix area the team suspended operations pending the acquisition of a new arena. All Coyotes' players and personnel were transferred to the expansion Utah Mammoth.)
Totals (Note: Totals as of the completion of the 2023–24 season)					2,142	918	939	94	191	2,121	5,584	6,250	66	26	40	155	202	9 playoff appearances

=== All-time records ===
Statistic	GP	W	L	T	OT
Regular season record (1996–2024)	2,142	918	939	94	191
Postseason record (1996–2024)	66	26	40	—	—
All-time regular and postseason record	2,208	944	979	94	191
All-time series record: 3–9
