= 2020–21 San Jose Sharks season =

Season of Ice hockey team

2020–21 San Jose Sharks
- Division: 7th West
- 2020–21 record: 21–28–7
- Home record: 11–13–4
- Road record: 10–15–3
- Goals for: 151
- Goals against: 199

Team information
- General manager: Doug Wilson
- Coach: Bob Boughner
- Captain: Logan Couture
- Alternate captains: Brent Burns; Tomas Hertl; Erik Karlsson; Patrick Marleau
- Arena: SAP Center
- Minor league affiliate: San Jose Barracuda (AHL)

Team leaders
- Goals: Evander Kane (22)
- Assists: Evander Kane (27)
- Points: Evander Kane (49)
- Penalty minutes: Kurtis Gabriel (55)
- Plus/minus: Kurtis Gabriel; Tomas Hertl (+1)
- Wins: Martin Jones (15)
- Goals against average: Josef Korenar (3.17)

The 2020–21 San Jose Sharks season was the 30th season for the National Hockey League (NHL) franchise that was established on May 9, 1990.

On December 20, 2020, the league temporarily realigned into four divisions with no conferences due to the COVID-19 pandemic and the ongoing closure of the Canada–United States border. As a result of this realignment, the Sharks will play this season in the West Division and will play games against only the other teams in their new division during the regular season and potentially the first two rounds of the playoffs.

Due to Santa Clara County banning all contact sports in response to a local rise of COVID-19 cases, the Sharks began the season on an extended road trip. Their first two home games on February 1 and 3 against the Vegas Golden Knights were to have been held at Gila River Arena, the home of division rival Arizona Coyotes, but ended up being postponed due to a COVID outbreak among the Golden Knights. On January 25, Santa Clara County health officials announced that they were lifting the ban, and the Sharks returned to SAP Center on February 13.

On May 3, the Sharks were eliminated from playoff contention after a 5–4 overtime loss to the Colorado Avalanche.

== Draft picks ==
Below are the San Jose Sharks' selections at the 2020 NHL entry draft, which was originally scheduled for June 26 and 27, 2020, at the Bell Center in Montreal, Quebec, but was postponed on March 25, 2020, to October 6 and 7, 2020. It was instead held virtually via video conference call from the NHL Network studio in Secaucus, New Jersey.

Round	#	Player	Pos	Nationality	College/Junior/Club (League)
1	31	Ozzy Wiesblatt	RW	Canada	Prince Albert Raiders (WHL)
2	38^{1}	Thomas Bordeleau	C	United States	U.S. NTDP (USHL)
2	56	Tristen Robins	RW	Canada	Saskatoon Blades (WHL)
4	76^{2}	Danil Gushchin	LW	Russia	Muskegon Lumberjacks (USHL)
4	98	Brandon Coe	RW	Canada	North Bay Battalion (OHL)
7	196	Alex Young	C	Canada	Colgate (ECAC)
7	201	Adam Raska	RW	Czech Republic	Rimouski Océanic (QMJHL)
7	206	Linus Oberg	C	Sweden	Örebro HK (SHL)
7	210	Timofey Spitserov	RW	Russia	Muskegon Lumberjacks (USHL)

Notes:

1. The Buffalo Sabres traded their 38th and 100th selection in this years' draft for the 34th pick from the Sharks.
2. The Sharks traded their 100th and 126th selection in this years' draft for the 76th pick to the Edmonton Oilers.

== Standings ==
=== Divisional standings ===
West Division
Pos	Team	GP	W	L	OTL	RW	GF	GA	GD	Pts
1	p – Colorado Avalanche	56	39	13	4	35	197	133	+64	82
2	x – Vegas Golden Knights	56	40	14	2	30	191	124	+67	82
3	x – Minnesota Wild	56	35	16	5	27	181	160	+21	75
4	x – St. Louis Blues	56	27	20	9	19	169	170	−1	63
5	Arizona Coyotes	56	24	26	6	19	153	176	−23	54
6	Los Angeles Kings	56	21	28	7	19	143	170	−27	49
7	San Jose Sharks	56	21	28	7	15	151	199	−48	49
8	Anaheim Ducks	56	17	30	9	11	126	179	−53	43

Source: National Hockey League
Rules for classification: 1) Fewer number of games played (GP, only during regular season); 2) Greater number of regulation wins (RW); 3) Greater number of wins in regulation and overtime, excluding shootout wins (ROW); 4) Greater number of total wins, including shootouts (W); 5) Greater number of points earned in head-to-head play; if teams played an uneven number of head-to-head games, the result of the first game on the home ice of the team with the extra home game is discarded; 6) Greater goal differential (GD); 7) Greater number of goals scored (GF)
p – Clinched Presidents' Trophy; x – Clinched playoff spot

== Schedule and results ==
=== Regular season ===
The schedule was announced on December 23, 2020.

2020–21 game log 21–28–7 (Home: 11–13–4; Road: 10–15–3)

January: 3–5–0 (Home: 0–0–0; Road: 3–5–0)
#	Date	Opponent	Score	OT	Decision	Arena	Attendance	Record	Pts	Recap
1	January 14	@ Arizona	4–3	SO	Jones	Gila River Arena	2,274	1–0–0	2
2	January 16	@ Arizona	3–5		Jones	Gila River Arena	2,384	1–1–0	2
3	January 18	@ St. Louis	4–5		Dubnyk	Enterprise Center	0	1–2–0	2
4	January 20	@ St. Louis	2–1	SO	Jones	Enterprise Center	0	2–2–0	4
5	January 22	@ Minnesota	1–4		Dubnyk	Xcel Energy Center	0	2–3–0	4
6	January 24	@ Minnesota	5–3		Jones	Xcel Energy Center	0	3–3–0	6
7	January 26	@ Colorado	3–7		Jones	Ball Arena	0	3–4–0	6
8	January 28	@ Colorado	0–3		Dubnyk	Ball Arena	0	3–5–0	6

February: 4–4–2 (Home: 1–3–0; Road: 3–1–2)
#	Date	Opponent	Score	OT	Decision	Arena	Attendance	Record	Pts	Recap
–	February 1	Vegas	Postponed. (Note: The game originally scheduled for February 1 was postponed due to several players from Vegas in the COVID-19 protocol.)
–	February 3	Vegas	Postponed. (Note: The game originally scheduled for February 3 was postponed due to several players from Vegas in the COVID-19 protocol.)
9	February 5	@ Anaheim	5–4	SO	Jones	Honda Center	0	4–5–0	8
10	February 6	@ Anaheim	1–2	SO	Dubnyk	Honda Center	0	4–5–1	9
11	February 9	@ Los Angeles	4–3	SO	Jones	Staples Center	0	5–5–1	11
12	February 11	@ Los Angeles	2–6		Jones	Staples Center	0	5–6–1	11
13	February 13	Vegas	1–3		Jones	SAP Center	0	5–7–1	11
14	February 15	Anaheim	3–2		Jones	SAP Center	0	6–7–1	13
15	February 18	@ St. Louis	2–3	OT	Jones	Enterprise Center	0	6–7–2	14
16	February 20	@ St. Louis	5–4		Dubnyk	Enterprise Center	0	7–7–2	16
17	February 22 (Note: The game originally scheduled for April 23 was moved forward due to COVID-related issues by the Wild.)	Minnesota	2–6		Jones	SAP Center	0	7–8–2	16
–	February 25	Vegas	Postponed. (Note: The game originally scheduled for February 3 and rescheduled to February 25, was postponed due to a player from San Jose in the COVID-19 protocol.)
18	February 27	St. Louis	6–7		Dubnyk	SAP Center	0	7–9–2	16

March: 8–7–2 (Home: 6–3–2; Road: 2–4–0)
#	Date	Opponent	Score	OT	Decision	Arena	Attendance	Record	Pts	Recap
19	March 1	Colorado	6–2		Jones	SAP Center	0	8–9–2	18
20	March 3	Colorado	0–4		Jones	SAP Center	0	8–10–2	18
21	March 5	Vegas	4–5	OT	Jones	SAP Center	0	8–10–3	19
22	March 6	Vegas	0–4		Dubnyk	SAP Center	0	8–11–3	19
23	March 8 (Note: The game, originally scheduled for February 26, was postponed due to schedule adjustments.)	St. Louis	3–2	OT	Dubnyk	SAP Center	0	9–11–3	21
24	March 12	@ Anaheim	6–0		Dubnyk	Honda Center	0	10–11–3	23
25	March 13	@ Anaheim	3–1		Jones	Honda Center	0	11–11–3	25
26	March 15	@ Vegas	1–2		Dubnyk	T-Mobile Arena	3,473	11–12–3	25
27	March 16	@ Vegas	4–5		Dubnyk	T-Mobile Arena	3,473	11–13–3	25
28	March 19	St. Louis	1–2	SO	Jones	SAP Center	0	11–13–4	26
29	March 20	St. Louis	2–5		Dubnyk	SAP Center	0	11–14–4	26
30	March 22	Los Angeles	2–1		Jones	SAP Center	0	12–14–4	28
31	March 24	Los Angeles	4–2		Jones	SAP Center	0	13–14–4	30
32	March 26	@ Arizona	2–5		Jones	Gila River Arena	3,007	13–15–4	30
33	March 27	@ Arizona	0–4		Dubnyk	Gila River Arena	3,217	13–16–4	30
34	March 29	Minnesota	4–3	SO	Jones	SAP Center	0	14–16–4	32
35	March 31	Minnesota	4–2		Jones	SAP Center	0	15–16–4	34

April: 5–9–1 (Home: 3–5–0; Road: 2–4–1)
#	Date	Opponent	Score	OT	Decision	Arena	Attendance	Record	Pts	Recap
36	April 2	@ Los Angeles	3–0		Jones	Staples Center	0	16–16–4	36
37	April 3	@ Los Angeles	3–2		Jones	Staples Center	0	17–16–4	38
38	April 6 (Note: The game, originally scheduled for February 13, was postponed due to schedule adjustments.)	Anaheim	1–5		Jones	SAP Center	0	17–17–4	38
39	April 9	Los Angeles	5–2		Jones	SAP Center	0	18–17–4	40
40	April 10	Los Angeles	2–4		Jones	SAP Center	0	18–18–4	40
41	April 12	Anaheim	0–4		Jones	SAP Center	0	18–19–4	40
42	April 14	Anaheim	1–4		Korenar	SAP Center	0	18–20–4	40
43	April 16	@ Minnesota	2–3		Jones	Xcel Energy Center	3,000	18–21–4	40
44	April 17	@ Minnesota	2–5		Jones	Xcel Energy Center	3,000	18–22–4	40
45	April 19	@ Vegas	2–3	SO	Jones	T-Mobile Arena	3,950	18–22–5	41
46	April 21	@ Vegas	2–5		Korenar	T-Mobile Arena	3,950	18–23–5	41
–	April 23 (Note: The game, originally scheduled for February 25, was postponed due to a San Jose player in the COVID-19 protocol.)	Vegas	Postponed. (Note: The game, originally scheduled for February 25 and rescheduled to April 23, was then rescheduled to May 10 and later moved to May 12.)
47	April 24	Minnesota	3–6		Korenar	SAP Center	0	18–24–5	41
48	April 26	Arizona	6–4		Korenar	SAP Center	520	19–24–5	43
49	April 28	Arizona	4–2		Korenar	SAP Center	1,037	20–24–5	45
50	April 30	@ Colorado	0–3		Jones	Ball Arena	4,045	20–25–5	45

May: 1–3–2 (Home: 1–2–2; Road: 0–1–0)
#	Date	Opponent	Score	OT	Decision	Arena	Attendance	Record	Pts	Recap
51	May 1	@ Colorado	3–4		Korenar	Ball Arena	4,037	20–26–5	45
52	May 3	Colorado	4–5	OT	Jones	SAP Center	1,071	20–26–6	46
53	May 5	Colorado	3–2		Korenar	SAP Center	1,041	21–26–6	48
54	May 7	Arizona	2–5		Korenar	SAP Center	1,145	21–27–6	48
55	May 8	Arizona	4–5	OT	Melnichuk	SAP Center	1,249	21–27–7	49
56	May 12	Vegas	0–6		Melnichuk	SAP Center	1,654	21–28–7	49

Legend: Win (2 points) Loss (0 points) Overtime/shootout loss (1 point) Postponement

== Player statistics ==
=== Skaters ===
Regular season
Player	GP	G	A	Pts	+/−	PIM
Evander Kane	56	22	27	49	−1	42
Tomas Hertl	50	19	24	43	+1	27
Logan Couture	53	17	14	31	−10	25
Timo Meier	54	12	19	31	−7	22
Brent Burns	56	7	22	29	−12	36
Kevin Labanc	55	12	16	28	−9	31
Erik Karlsson	52	8	14	22	−18	18
Ryan Donato	50	6	14	20	−10	10
Rudolfs Balcers	41	8	9	17	−6	16
Mario Ferraro	56	1	16	17	−6	22
John Leonard	44	3	10	13	−7	2
Dylan Gambrell	49	5	7	12	−18	13
Nikolai Knyzhov	56	2	8	10	−10	39
Patrick Marleau	56	4	5	9	−9	10
Matt Nieto	28	5	2	7	−5	4
Alexander Barabanov^{†}	9	3	4	7	0	2
Noah Gregor	30	5	1	6	−16	6
Radim Simek	40	2	4	6	−9	15
Marc-Edouard Vlasic	51	1	5	6	−7	8
Marcus Sorensen	29	1	4	5	−5	16
Joel Kellman	7	1	1	2	−1	6
Sasha Chmelevski	5	0	2	2	−2	2
Joachim Blichfeld	5	1	0	1	−2	12
Fredrik Handemark	8	1	0	1	−3	2
Nicolas Meloche	7	0	1	1	+1	0
Greg Pateryn^{†}	2	0	1	1	+1	2
Alexander True	7	0	1	1	+1	6
Ivan Chekhovich	4	0	1	1	−3	0
Christian Jaros	7	0	1	1	−4	2
Fredrik Claesson^{‡}	4	0	0	0	+1	0
Kurtis Gabriel	11	0	0	0	+1	55
Antti Suomela^{‡}	4	0	0	0	0	0
Stefan Noesen^{‡}	5	0	0	0	0	2
Brinson Pasichnuk	4	0	0	0	−1	2
Lean Bergmann	1	0	0	0	−1	4
Jacob Middleton	1	0	0	0	−2	2
Jeffrey Viel	11	0	0	0	−7	23

=== Goaltenders ===
Regular season
Player	GP	GS	TOI	W	L	OT	GA	GAA	SA	SV%	SO	G	A	PIM
Martin Jones	34	34	1,868	15	13	4	102	3.28	980	.896	1	0	0	0
Josef Korenar	10	7	492	3	5	0	26	3.17	258	.899	0	0	0	0
Devan Dubnyk	17	13	888	3	9	2	47	3.18	462	.898	1	0	0	2
Alexei Melnichuk	3	2	131	0	1	1	11	5.05	81	.864	0	0	0	0

^{†}Denotes player spent time with another team before joining the Sharks. Stats reflect time with the Sharks only.
^{‡}Denotes player was traded mid-season. Stats reflect time with the Sharks only.

== Transactions ==
The Sharks have been involved in the following transactions during the 2020–21 season.

=== Trades ===
Date	Details		Ref
October 7, 2020	To Buffalo Sabres 2nd-round pick in 2020	To San Jose Sharks 2nd-round pick in 2020; 4th-round pick in 2020	
October 7, 2020	To Edmonton Oilers 4th-round pick in 2020; 5th-round pick in 2020	To San Jose Sharks 3rd-round pick in 2020	
October 7, 2020	To Montreal Canadiens 3rd-round pick in 2021	To San Jose Sharks 4th-round pick in 2020	
October 7, 2020	To New York Rangers 5th-round pick in 2020	To San Jose Sharks Two 7th-round picks in 2020	
January 27, 2021	To Anaheim Ducks Trevor Carrick	To San Jose Sharks Jack Kopacka	
January 27, 2021	To Ottawa Senators Jack Kopacka	To San Jose Sharks Christian Jaros	
April 10, 2021	To Colorado Avalanche Devan Dubnyk	To San Jose Sharks Greg Pateryn; 5th-round pick in 2021	
April 11, 2021	To Columbus Blue Jackets Cash considerations	To San Jose Sharks Nick Foligno	
April 11, 2021	To Toronto Maple Leafs Stefan Noesen; Nick Foligno	To San Jose Sharks 4th-round pick in 2021	
April 12, 2021	To Tampa Bay Lightning Fredrik Claesson	To San Jose Sharks Magnus Chrona	
April 12, 2021	To Chicago Blackhawks Cash considerations	To San Jose Sharks Mattias Janmark	
April 12, 2021	To Vegas Golden Knights Mattias Janmark; Nick DeSimone	To San Jose Sharks BUF 5th-round pick in 2022	
April 12, 2021	To Toronto Maple Leafs Antti Suomela	To San Jose Sharks Alexander Barabanov	

=== Free agents ===
Date	Player	Team	Contract term	Ref
October 9, 2020	Anthony Greco	to New York Rangers	2-year	
October 9, 2020	Brandon Davidson	to Buffalo Sabres	1-year	
October 9, 2020	Jonny Brodzinski	to New York Rangers	1-year	
October 13, 2020	Patrick Marleau	from Pittsburgh Penguins	1-year	
October 13, 2020	Matt Nieto	from Colorado Avalanche	1-year	
October 13, 2020	Aaron Dell	to Toronto Maple Leafs	1-year	
October 16, 2020	Joe Thornton	to Toronto Maple Leafs	1-year	
November 2, 2020	Kurtis Gabriel	from Minnesota Wild	1-year	
January 1, 2021	Tristen Robins	from Saskatoon Blades	1-year	
January 11, 2021	Fredrik Claesson	from New Jersey Devils	1-year	

=== Waivers ===
Date	Player	Team	Ref
January 12, 2021	Rudolfs Balcers	from Ottawa Senators	

=== Signings ===
Date	Player	Contract term	Ref
October 6, 2020	Jayden Halbgewachs	2-year	
October 6, 2020	Nicolas Meloche	1-year	
October 7, 2020	Antti Suomela	1-year	
October 9, 2020	Stefan Noesen	1-year	
October 10, 2020	Kevin Labanc	4-year	
April 2, 2021	Scott Reedy	2-year	
April 12, 2021	Zach Sawchenko	2-year	
May 12, 2021	Alexander Barabanov	1-year	
May 12, 2021	Santeri Hatakka	3-year	
May 12, 2021	Adam Raska	3-year	
May 21, 2021	Daniil Gushchin	3-year	
June 14, 2021	Jeffrey Viel	2-year	
June 14, 2021	Jonathan Dahlen	1-year	
June 14, 2021	Nicolas Meloche	1-year	
June 21, 2021	Matt Nieto	2-year	
July 13, 2021	Josef Korenar	1-year	
July 15, 2021	Dylan Gambrell	1-year	

=== Contract terminations ===
Date	Player	Via	Ref
December 25, 2020	Danil Yurtaikin	Waived	

== Awards ==
Regular season
Player	Award	Awarded
Logan Couture	West Star of the Month	March 2, 2021
Martin Jones	Second Star of the Week	April 5, 2021
