= 2020–21 Minnesota Wild season =

Professional ice hockey team season of play

2020–21 Minnesota Wild
- Division: 3rd West
- 2020–21 record: 35–16–5
- Home record: 21–5–2
- Road record: 14–11–3
- Goals for: 181
- Goals against: 160

Team information
- General manager: Bill Guerin
- Coach: Dean Evason
- Captain: Jared Spurgeon
- Alternate captains: Zach Parise; Ryan Suter
- Arena: Xcel Energy Center
- Minor league affiliates: Iowa Wild (AHL); Allen Americans (ECHL)

Team leaders
- Goals: Kirill Kaprizov (27)
- Assists: Jordan Greenway (26)
- Points: Kirill Kaprizov (51)
- Penalty minutes: Carson Soucy (51)
- Plus/minus: Carson Soucy (+22)
- Wins: Cam Talbot (19)
- Goals against average: Cam Talbot (2.63)

The 2020–21 Minnesota Wild season was the 21st season for the National Hockey League (NHL) franchise that was established on June 25, 1997. This was the first time since the 2005–06 season that Mikko Koivu was not on the roster after he signed a contract with the Columbus Blue Jackets. On December 20, 2020, the league temporarily realigned into four divisions with no conferences due to the COVID-19 pandemic and the ongoing closure of the Canada–United States border. As a result of this realignment, the Wild would play this season in the West Division and would only play games against the other teams in their new division during the regular season and potentially the first two rounds of the playoffs.

On April 24, 2021, the Wild clinched a playoff berth after a 6–3 win against the San Jose Sharks. They were eliminated from the playoffs with a 6–2 loss to the Vegas Golden Knights on May 28, after coming back from a 3–1 series deficit to force game seven.

== Standings ==
=== Divisional standings ===
West Division
Pos	Team	GP	W	L	OTL	RW	GF	GA	GD	Pts
1	p – Colorado Avalanche	56	39	13	4	35	197	133	+64	82
2	x – Vegas Golden Knights	56	40	14	2	30	191	124	+67	82
3	x – Minnesota Wild	56	35	16	5	27	181	160	+21	75
4	x – St. Louis Blues	56	27	20	9	19	169	170	−1	63
5	Arizona Coyotes	56	24	26	6	19	153	176	−23	54
6	Los Angeles Kings	56	21	28	7	19	143	170	−27	49
7	San Jose Sharks	56	21	28	7	15	151	199	−48	49
8	Anaheim Ducks	56	17	30	9	11	126	179	−53	43

Source: National Hockey League
Rules for classification: 1) Fewer number of games played (GP, only during regular season); 2) Greater number of regulation wins (RW); 3) Greater number of wins in regulation and overtime, excluding shootout wins (ROW); 4) Greater number of total wins, including shootouts (W); 5) Greater number of points earned in head-to-head play; if teams played an uneven number of head-to-head games, the result of the first game on the home ice of the team with the extra home game is discarded; 6) Greater goal differential (GD); 7) Greater number of goals scored (GF)
p – Clinched Presidents' Trophy; x – Clinched playoff spot

== Schedule and results ==
=== Regular season ===
The regular season schedule was published on December 23, 2020.

2020–21 game log: 35–16–5 (Home: 21–5–2; Road: 14–11–3)

January: 6–4–0 (Home: 3–3–0; Road: 3–1–0)
#	Date	Visitor	Score	Home	OT	Decision	Attendance	Record	Pts	Recap
1	January 14	Minnesota	4–3	Los Angeles	OT	Talbot	0	1–0–0	2
2	January 16	Minnesota	4–3	Los Angeles	OT	Talbot	0	2–0–0	4
3	January 18	Minnesota	0–1	Anaheim		Talbot	0	2–1–0	4
4	January 20	Minnesota	3–2	Anaheim		Kahkonen	0	3–1–0	6
5	January 22	San Jose	1–4	Minnesota		Kahkonen	0	4–1–0	8
6	January 24	San Jose	5–3	Minnesota		Kahkonen	0	4–2–0	8
7	January 26	Los Angeles	2–1	Minnesota		Kahkonen	0	4–3–0	8
8	January 28	Los Angeles	3–5	Minnesota		Kahkonen	0	5–3–0	10
9	January 30	Colorado	5–1	Minnesota		Kahkonen	0	5–4–0	10
10	January 31	Colorado	3–4	Minnesota	OT	Talbot	0	6–4–0	12

February: 6–2–0 (Home: 2–0–0; Road: 4–2–0)
#	Date	Visitor	Score	Home	OT	Decision	Attendance	Record	Pts	Recap
11	February 2	Minnesota	1–2	Colorado		Talbot	0	6–5–0	12
—	February 4	Minnesota	–	Colorado	Postponed due to COVID-19. Rescheduled for February 24.
—	February 6	Arizona	–	Minnesota	Postponed due to COVID-19. Rescheduled for March 16.
—	February 7	Arizona	–	Minnesota	Postponed due to COVID-19. Rescheduled for April 14.
—	February 9	St. Louis	–	Minnesota	Postponed due to COVID-19. Rescheduled for April 12.
—	February 11	St. Louis	–	Minnesota	Postponed due to COVID-19. Rescheduled for March 25.
—	February 13	Minnesota	–	Los Angeles	Postponed due to COVID-19. Rescheduled for April 23.
12	February 16	Minnesota	0–4	Los Angeles		Kahkonen	0	6–6–0	12
13	February 18	Minnesota	3–1	Anaheim		Kahkonen	0	7–6–0	14
14	February 20	Minnesota	5–1	Anaheim		Kahkonen	0	8–6–0	16
15 (Note: The following games have been rescheduled: Minnesota at San Jose originally scheduled for April 23, is now scheduled for February 22.; Minnesota at St. Louis originally scheduled for April 11, is now scheduled for April 10.)	February 22	Minnesota	6–2	San Jose		Kahkonen	0	9–6–0	18
16	February 24	Minnesota	6–2	Colorado		Kahkonen	0	10–6–0	20
17	February 26	Los Angeles	1–3	Minnesota		Talbot	0	11–6–0	22
18	February 27	Los Angeles	3–4	Minnesota	OT	Kahkonen	0	12–6–0	24

March: 9–5–2 (Home: 8–0–0; Road: 1–5–2)
#	Date	Visitor	Score	Home	OT	Decision	Attendance	Record	Pts	Recap
19	March 1	Minnesota	4–5	Vegas	OT	Talbot	2,605	12–6–1	25
20	March 3	Minnesota	1–5	Vegas		Talbot	2,610	12–7–1	25
21	March 5	Minnesota	5–1	Arizona		Kahkonen	2,541	13–7–1	27
22	March 6	Minnesota	2–5	Arizona		Talbot	3,141	13–8–1	27
23	March 8	Vegas	0–2	Minnesota		Kahkonen	0	14–8–1	29
24	March 10	Vegas	3–4	Minnesota		Kahkonen	0	15–8–1	31
25	March 12	Arizona	0–4	Minnesota		Talbot	0	16–8–1	33
26	March 14	Arizona	1–4	Minnesota		Talbot	0	17–8–1	35
27	March 16	Arizona	0–3	Minnesota		Kahkonen	0	18–8–1	37
28	March 18	Minnesota	1–5	Colorado		Talbot	0	18–9–1	37
29	March 20	Minnesota	0–6	Colorado		Kahkonen	0	18–10–1	37
30	March 22	Anaheim	1–2	Minnesota		Talbot	0	19–10–1	39
31	March 24	Anaheim	2–3	Minnesota		Talbot	0	20–10–1	41
32	March 25	St. Louis	0–2	Minnesota		Talbot	0	21–10–1	43
33	March 29	Minnesota	3–4	San Jose	SO	Talbot	0	21–10–2	44
34	March 31	Minnesota	2–4	San Jose		Kahkonen	0	21–11–2	44

April: 10–3–2 (Home: 4–2–1; Road: 6–1–1)
#	Date	Visitor	Score	Home	OT	Decision	Attendance	Record	Pts	Recap
35	April 1	Minnesota	3–2	Vegas	SO	Talbot	3,950	22–11–2	46
36	April 3	Minnesota	2–1	Vegas		Talbot	3,950	23–11–2	48
37	April 5	Colorado	5–4	Minnesota		Talbot	3,000	23–12–2	48
38	April 7	Colorado	3–8	Minnesota		Talbot	3,000	24–12–2	50
39	April 9	Minnesota	1–9	St. Louis		Kahkonen	— (Note: Spectators were in attendance, but the exact number was not reported.)	24–13–2	50
40	April 10	Minnesota	2–3	St. Louis	OT	Talbot	—	24–13–3	51
—	April 12	St. Louis	–	Minnesota	Postponed due to the Brooklyn Center shooting. Rescheduled for May 12.
41	April 14	Arizona	2–5	Minnesota		Talbot	3,000	25–13–3	53
42	April 16	San Jose	2–3	Minnesota		Talbot	3,000	26–13–3	55
43	April 17	San Jose	2–5	Minnesota		Kahkonen	3,000	27–13–3	57
44	April 19	Minnesota	5–2	Arizona		Talbot	3,481	28–13–3	59
45	April 21	Minnesota	4–1	Arizona		Talbot	3,736	29–13–3	61
46	April 23	Minnesota	4–2	Los Angeles		Talbot	1,091	30–13–3	63
47	April 24	Minnesota	6–3	San Jose		Kahkonen	0	31–13–3	65
48	April 28	St. Louis	4–3	Minnesota		Talbot	3,000	31–14–3	65
49 (Note: The following games have been rescheduled: St. Louis at Minnesota originally scheduled for April 26, is now scheduled for April 29.; Minnesota at St. Louis originally scheduled for April 30, is now scheduled for May 12.; Minnesota at St. Louis originally scheduled for May 1, is now scheduled for May 13.)	April 29	St. Louis	5–4	Minnesota	OT	Talbot	3,000	31–14–4	66

May: 4–2–1 (Home: 4–0–1; Road: 0–2–0)
#	Date	Visitor	Score	Home	OT	Decision	Attendance	Record	Pts	Recap
50 (Note: Minnesota's home game vs. St. Louis, originally scheduled for February 9, was rescheduled three times: first to April 12, then to May 12, and then finally to May 1. The schedule change was made due to COVID-19 protocol and the Daunte Wright shooting.)	May 1	St. Louis	3–4	Minnesota	OT	Kahkonen	3,000	32–14–4	68
51	May 3	Vegas	5–6	Minnesota		Talbot	3,000	33–14–4	70
52	May 5	Vegas	3–2	Minnesota	OT	Talbot	3,000	33–14–5	71
53	May 7	Anaheim	3–4	Minnesota	OT	Kahkonen	3,000	34–14–5	73
54	May 8	Anaheim	3–4	Minnesota	OT	Talbot	3,300	35–14–5	75
55	May 12	Minnesota	0–4	St. Louis		Talbot	—	35–15–5	75
56	May 13	Minnesota	3–7	St. Louis		Kahkonen	—	35–16–5	75

Legend: Win (2 points) Loss (0 points) Overtime/shootout loss (1 point) Postponement

=== Playoffs ===
2021 Stanley Cup playoffs

West Division First Round vs. (W2) Vegas Golden Knights: Vegas won 4–3
#	Date	Visitor	Score	Home	OT	Decision	Attendance	Series	Recap
1	May 16	Minnesota	1–0	Vegas	OT	Talbot	8,683	1–0
2	May 18	Minnesota	1–3	Vegas		Talbot	8,683	1–1
3	May 20	Vegas	5–2	Minnesota		Talbot	4,500	1–2
4	May 22	Vegas	4–0	Minnesota		Talbot	4,500	1–3
5	May 24	Minnesota	4–2	Vegas		Talbot	12,156	2–3
6	May 26	Vegas	0–3	Minnesota		Talbot	4,500	3–3
7	May 28	Minnesota	2–6	Vegas		Talbot	12,156	3–4

Legend: Win Loss

== Draft picks ==
Below are the Minnesota Wild's selections at the 2020 NHL entry draft, which was originally scheduled for June 26–27, 2020, at the Bell Center in Montreal, Quebec, but was postponed on March 25, 2020, due to the COVID-19 pandemic. It was held on October 6–7, 2020, virtually via video conference call from the NHL Network studios in Secaucus, New Jersey.

Round	#	Player	Pos	Nationality	College/Junior/Club team (League)
1	9	Marco Rossi	C	Austria	Ottawa 67's (OHL)
2	37	Marat Khusnutdinov	C	Russia	SKA-1946 (MHL)
2	39	Ryan O'Rourke	D	Canada	Sault Ste. Marie Greyhounds (OHL)
3	65	Daemon Hunt	D	Canada	Moose Jaw Warriors (WHL)
5	146	Pavel Novak	RW	Czech Republic	Kelowna Rockets (WHL)
