= 2020–21 St. Louis Blues season =

National Hockey League team season

2020–21 St. Louis Blues
- Division: 4th West
- 2020–21 record: 27–20–9
- Home record: 12–11–5
- Road record: 15–9–4
- Goals for: 169
- Goals against: 170

Team information
- General manager: Doug Armstrong
- Coach: Craig Berube
- Captain: Ryan O'Reilly
- Alternate captains: Colton Parayko; Brayden Schenn; Vladimir Tarasenko
- Arena: Enterprise Center
- Minor league affiliates: Springfield Thunderbirds (AHL); Utica Comets (AHL)

Team leaders
- Goals: Ryan O'Reilly (24)
- Assists: David Perron (39)
- Points: David Perron (58)
- Penalty minutes: Robert Bortuzzo (47)
- Plus/minus: Ryan O'Reilly (+26)
- Wins: Jordan Binnington (18)
- Goals against average: Jordan Binnington (2.65)

The 2020–21 St. Louis Blues season was the 54th season for the National Hockey League (NHL) franchise that was established in 1967. Head coach Craig Berube coached his third season with the team.

On December 20, 2020, the league temporarily realigned into four divisions with no conferences due to the COVID-19 pandemic and the ongoing closure of the Canada–United States border. As a result of this realignment, the Blues would play this season in the West Division and would only play games against the other teams in their new division during the regular season and potentially the first two rounds of the playoffs.

On May 7, 2021, the Blues clinched a playoff berth despite a 4–3 overtime loss to the Vegas Golden Knights. The Blues were eliminated from the playoffs in a four-game sweep by the Colorado Avalanche, with a 5–2 loss in game four on May 23.

== Standings ==
=== Divisional standings ===
West Division
Pos	Team	GP	W	L	OTL	RW	GF	GA	GD	Pts
1	p – Colorado Avalanche	56	39	13	4	35	197	133	+64	82
2	x – Vegas Golden Knights	56	40	14	2	30	191	124	+67	82
3	x – Minnesota Wild	56	35	16	5	27	181	160	+21	75
4	x – St. Louis Blues	56	27	20	9	19	169	170	−1	63
5	Arizona Coyotes	56	24	26	6	19	153	176	−23	54
6	Los Angeles Kings	56	21	28	7	19	143	170	−27	49
7	San Jose Sharks	56	21	28	7	15	151	199	−48	49
8	Anaheim Ducks	56	17	30	9	11	126	179	−53	43

Source: National Hockey League
Rules for classification: 1) Fewer number of games played (GP, only during regular season); 2) Greater number of regulation wins (RW); 3) Greater number of wins in regulation and overtime, excluding shootout wins (ROW); 4) Greater number of total wins, including shootouts (W); 5) Greater number of points earned in head-to-head play; if teams played an uneven number of head-to-head games, the result of the first game on the home ice of the team with the extra home game is discarded; 6) Greater goal differential (GD); 7) Greater number of goals scored (GF)
p – Clinched Presidents' Trophy; x – Clinched playoff spot

== Schedule and results ==
=== Regular season ===
The regular season schedule was published on December 23, 2020.

2020–21 game log

January: 6–2–1 (Home: 2–1–1; Road: 4–1–0)
#	Date	Visitor	Score	Home	OT	Decision	Attendance	Record	Pts	Recap
1	January 13	St. Louis	4–1	Colorado		Binnington	0	1–0–0	2
2	January 15	St. Louis	0–8	Colorado		Binnington	0	1–1–0	2
3	January 18	San Jose	4–5	St. Louis		Binnington	0	2–1–0	4
4	January 20	San Jose	2–1	St. Louis	SO	Binnington	0	2–1–1	5
5	January 23	Los Angeles	2–4	St. Louis		Binnington	0	3–1–1	7
6	January 24	Los Angeles	6–3	St. Louis		Husso	0	3–2–1	7
7	January 26	St. Louis	5–4	Vegas	SO	Binnington	0	4–2–1	9
—	January 28	St. Louis	–	Vegas	Postponed due to COVID protocol. Makeup date March 22.
8	January 30	St. Louis	6–1	Anaheim		Binnington	0	5–2–1	11
9	January 31	St. Louis	4–1	Anaheim		Husso	0	6–2–1	13

February: 5–6–1 (Home: 2–5–1; Road: 3–1–0)
#	Date	Visitor	Score	Home	OT	Decision	Attendance	Record	Pts	Recap
10	February 2	Arizona	3–4	St. Louis		Binnington	1,400	7–2–1	15
11	February 4	Arizona	4–3	St. Louis		Binnington	— (Note: Spectators were in attendance, but the exact number was not reported.)	7–3–1	15
—	February 6	Colorado	–	St. Louis	Postponed due to COVID-19. Rescheduled for April 14.
12 (Note: The following games have been rescheduled: Arizona at St. Louis originally scheduled for March 29, is now scheduled for February 6.; Arizona at St. Louis originally scheduled for March 31, is now scheduled for February 8.)	February 6	Arizona	3–1	St. Louis		Husso	—	7–4–1	15
—	February 7	Colorado	–	St. Louis	Postponed due to COVID-19. Rescheduled for April 20.
13	February 8	Arizona	4–3	St. Louis	SO	Binnington	—	7–4–2	16
—	February 9	St. Louis	–	Minnesota	Postponed due to COVID-19. Rescheduled for April 12.
—	February 11	St. Louis	–	Minnesota	Postponed due to COVID-19. Rescheduled for March 25.
14 (Note: The following game has been rescheduled: St. Louis at Arizona originally scheduled for April 15, is now scheduled for February 12.)	February 12	St. Louis	4–1	Arizona		Binnington	2,457	8–4–2	18
15	February 13	St. Louis	5–4	Arizona	OT	Husso	3,237	9–4–2	20
16	February 15	St. Louis	0–1	Arizona		Binnington	2,554	9–5–2	20
17	February 18	San Jose	2–3	St. Louis	OT	Binnington	—	10–5–2	22
18	February 20	San Jose	5–4	St. Louis		Binnington	—	10–6–2	22
19	February 22	Los Angeles	3–0	St. Louis		Binnington	—	10–7–2	22
20	February 24	Los Angeles	2–1	St. Louis		Binnington	—	10–8–2	22
21	February 27	St. Louis	7–6	San Jose		Husso	0	11–8–2	24

March: 5–5–4 (Home: 0–2–2; Road: 5–3–2)
#	Date	Visitor	Score	Home	OT	Decision	Attendance	Record	Pts	Recap
22	March 1	St. Louis	5–4	Anaheim		Husso	0	12–8–2	26
23	March 3	St. Louis	3–2	Anaheim		Binnington	0	13–8–2	28
24	March 5	St. Louis	3–2	Los Angeles	OT	Husso	0	14–8–2	30
25	March 6	St. Louis	3–4	Los Angeles	OT	Binnington	0	14–8–3	31
26 (Note: The following game has been rescheduled: St. Louis at San Jose originally scheduled for February 26, is now scheduled for March 8.)	March 8	St. Louis	2–3	San Jose	OT	Husso	0	14–8–4	32
27	March 12	Vegas	5–4	St. Louis	OT	Binnington	—	14–8–5	33
28	March 13	Vegas	5–1	St. Louis		Husso	—	14–9–5	33
—	March 15	St. Louis	–	Los Angeles	Postponed due to the March 2021 North American blizzard. (Note: Los Angeles was not affected by the storm. The Kings, who were coming off of a two-game series against the Avalanche, were stranded in Denver due to a blizzard generated by the storm.) Rescheduled for May 10.
29	March 17	St. Louis	1–4	Los Angeles		Binnington	0	14–10–5	33
30	March 19	St. Louis	2–1	San Jose	SO	Binnington	0	15–10–5	35
31	March 20	St. Louis	5–2	San Jose		Husso	0	16–10–5	37
32	March 22	St. Louis	1–5	Vegas		Binnington	3,750	16–11–5	37
33	March 25	St. Louis	0–2	Minnesota		Binnington	0	16–12–5	37
34	March 26	Anaheim	4–1	St. Louis		Binnington	—	16–13–5	37
35 (Note: The following games have been rescheduled: Anaheim at St. Louis originally scheduled for March 27, is now scheduled for March 28.; Minnesota at St. Louis originally scheduled for April 11, is now scheduled for April 10.)	March 28	Anaheim	3–2	St. Louis	OT	Binnington	—	16–13–6	38

April: 7–6–0 (Home: 5–3–0; Road: 2–3–0)
#	Date	Visitor	Score	Home	OT	Decision	Attendance	Record	Pts	Recap
36 (Note: The following game has been rescheduled: St. Louis at Colorado originally scheduled for April 20, is now scheduled for April 2.)	April 2	St. Louis	2–3	Colorado		Binnington	4,039	16–14–6	38
37	April 3	St. Louis	1–2	Colorado		Husso	4,035	16–15–6	38
38	April 5	Vegas	6–1	St. Louis		Husso	—	16–16–6	38
39	April 7	Vegas	1–3	St. Louis		Binnington	—	17–16–6	40
40	April 9	Minnesota	1–9	St. Louis		Binnington	—	18–16–6	42
41	April 10	Minnesota	2–3	St. Louis	OT	Husso	—	19–16–6	44
—	April 12	St. Louis	–	Minnesota	Postponed due to the Brooklyn Center shooting. Rescheduled for May 12.
42	April 14	Colorado	4–3	St. Louis		Binnington	—	19–17–6	44
43	April 17	St. Louis	2–3	Arizona		Binnington	3,981	19–18–6	44
—	April 20	Colorado	–	St. Louis	Postponed due to COVID-19. Rescheduled for April 26.
44	April 22	Colorado	4–2	St. Louis		Binnington	—	19–19–6	44
45	April 24	Colorado	3–5	St. Louis		Binnington	—	20–19–6	46
46	April 26	Colorado	1–4	St. Louis		Binnington	—	21–19–6	48
47	April 28	St. Louis	4–3	Minnesota		Binnington	3,000	22–19–6	50
48 (Note: The following games have been rescheduled: St. Louis at Minnesota originally scheduled for April 26, is now scheduled for April 29.; Minnesota at St. Louis originally scheduled for April 30, is now scheduled for May 12.; Minnesota at St. Louis originally scheduled for May 1, is now scheduled for May 13.)	April 29	St. Louis	5–4	Minnesota	OT	Husso	3,000	23–19–6	52

May: 4–1–3 (Home: 3–0–1; Road: 1–1–2)
#	Date	Visitor	Score	Home	OT	Decision	Attendance	Record	Pts	Recap
49 (Note: Minnesota's home game vs. St. Louis, originally scheduled for February 9, was rescheduled three times: first to April 12, then to May 12, and then finally to May 1. The schedule change was made due to COVID-19 protocol and the Daunte Wright shooting.)	May 1	St. Louis	3–4	Minnesota	OT	Binnington	3,000	23–19–7	53
50	May 3	Anaheim	1–3	St. Louis		Binnington	—	24–19–7	55
51	May 5	Anaheim	3–2	St. Louis	SO	Binnington	—	24–19–8	56
52	May 7	St. Louis	3–4	Vegas	OT	Binnington	7,567	24–19–9	57
53	May 8	St. Louis	1–4	Vegas		Husso	7,567	24–20–9	57
54	May 10	St. Louis	2–1	Los Angeles	OT	Binnington	2,154	25–20–9	59
55	May 12	Minnesota	0–4	St. Louis		Husso	—	26–20–9	61
56	May 13	Minnesota	3–7	St. Louis		Binnington	—	27–20–9	63

Legend: Win (2 points) Loss (0 points) Overtime/shootout loss (1 point) Postponement

=== Playoffs ===
2021 Stanley Cup playoffs

West Division First Round vs. (W1) Colorado Avalanche: Colorado won 4–0
#	Date	Visitor	Score	Home	OT	Decision	Attendance	Series	Recap
1	May 17	St. Louis	1–4	Colorado		Binnington	7,741	0–1
2	May 19	St. Louis	3–6	Colorado		Binnington	7,739	0–2
3	May 21	Colorado	5–1	St. Louis		Binnington	9,000	0–3
4	May 23	Colorado	5–2	St. Louis		Binnington	9,000	0–4

Legend: Win Loss

== Roster Changes ==
Date	Player	Transaction
September 2, 2020	Jake Allen, G	Traded to Montreal Canadiens
October 9, 2020	Troy Brouwer, RW	Unsigned Unrestricted Free Agent
October 9, 2020	Torey Krug, D	Free Agent - Signed 7 year, $45.5 million
October 11, 2020	Kyle Clifford, LW	Free Agent - Signed 2 year, $2 million
October 13, 2020	Alex Pietrangelo, D	Free Agent - Signed by Las Vegas Golden Knights
December 17, 2020	Alexander Steen, LW	Retired
January 11, 2021	Mike Hoffman, LW	Free Agent - Signed 1 year, $4 million
January 12, 2021	Jay Bouwmeester, D	Retired

== Draft picks ==
Below are the St. Louis Blues selection at the 2020 NHL Draft which was held on October 6–7 at NHL Network Studios

Round	#	Player	Pos	Nationally	College/junior/club team (league)
1	26	Jake Neighbours	(LW)	Canada	Edmonton Oil Kings (Western Hockey League) (WHL)
3	86	Dylan Peterson	(C)	United States	U.S. NTDP (United States Hockey League) (USHL)
3	88	Leo Loof	(D)	Sweden	Farjestad Jr. (U20 Superelite)
4	119	Tanner Dickinson	(C)	United States	Sault Ste. Marie Greyhounds (OHL)
5	150	Matthew Kessel	(D)	United States	UMass Minutemen (Hockey East)
6	163	Will Carnley	(G)	Canada	Ottawa 67ers (OHL)
7	194	Noah Beck	(D)	Canada	Fargo Force (USHL)
