= NHL on television in the 2020s =

NBC Sports's deal with the National Hockey League for U.S. television rights ran through the 2020–21 season, and was replaced in 2021–22 by seven-year agreements with ESPN and TNT to split coverage.

Rogers Communications's 12-year Canadian rights deal expires at the end of the 2025–26 season. It was extended by another 12 years through the 2037–38 season.

== NBC Sports ==
=== 2019–20 season ===
During the 2019–20 season, NBCSN flexed in several Washington Capitals games in February in anticipation of Alexander Ovechkin's 700th NHL goal. Those games used the NBC Sports Washington feed and announcers. In one instance, the February 10 broadcast involving the Capitals and New York Islanders aired nationally on NBCSN (blacked out in the team's local markets) at the expense of its originally-scheduled game between the Tampa Bay Lightning and Columbus Blue Jackets, which only aired on the team's local markets. In the end, however, NBCSN missed out on covering Ovechkin's 700th goal (which took place on Saturday afternoon, February 22, against the New Jersey Devils), due to a prior commitment with the 2020 Guinness Six Nations Rugby Championship. NHL Network aired the game instead.

On February 16, 2020, NBC announced that it had assigned an all-female crew to call the Blues–Blackhawks game on March 8 in Chicago in honor of International Women's Day. The game featured Kate Scott on play-by-play, A. J. Mleczko as booth analyst and Kendall Coyne Schofield as "Inside the Glass" analyst. Kathryn Tappen and Jennifer Botterill were tapped to work the game in the studio.

On October 19, 2020, NBC's lead play-by-play announcer Mike Emrick announced his retirement from broadcasting. Emirck's final assignment for NBC was his call of game six of the 2020 Stanley Cup Final. As he had been doing throughout the 2020 playoffs, the 74 year old Emrick called the Cup Finals off of monitors from his home studio in Metro Detroit, citing his advanced age as a potential risk for severe illness from COVID-19. Following Emrick's retirement, NBC did not name a presumptive lead play-by-play voice. Instead, they chose to rotate between John Forslund and Kenny Albert on the no. 1 team. On January 18, NBCSN aired a day-night quadruple-header on Martin Luther King Jr. Day, featuring Columbus at Detroit, Boston at New York Islanders, Buffalo at Philadelphia and Arizona at Vegas.

=== 2020–21 season ===
On January 22, 2021, an internal memo sent by NBC Sports president Pete Bevacqua announced that NBCSN would cease operations by the end of the year, and that USA Network would begin "carrying and/or simulcasting certain NBC Sports programming," including the Stanley Cup Playoffs and NASCAR races, before NBCSN's shutdown. Peacock, NBCUniversal's new streaming service, will also carry some of the network's former programming starting in 2022. The move was cited by industry analysts as a response to the impact of the COVID-19 pandemic on the sports and television industries, the acceleration of cord-cutting, as well as formidable competition from rival sports networks such as ESPN and Fox Sports 1.

On the weekend of February 20–21, 2021, the NHL held two contests outdoors at Lake Tahoe. Coverage of the Saturday game between the Vegas Golden Knights and the Colorado Avalanche began on NBC. Play was suspended after the first period due to ice conditions caused by its exposure to heat and sunlight; the game was resumed at 9:02 p.m. PT (12:02 a.m. ET). It was moved to NBCSN due to the delay. As a result of the Sunday game between the Philadelphia Flyers and Boston Bruins being moved to a 7:30 p.m. ET start time, it too was moved from NBC to NBCSN (with an evening game between the New Jersey Devils and Washington Capitals swapped into NBC's afternoon window as a replacement). Mike Tirico provided the play-by-play commentary alongside U.S. Hockey Hall of Fame member and color commentator Eddie Olczyk, and ‘‘Inside-the-Glass’’ reporter Brian Boucher. Rutledge Wood meanwhile, served as an on-site reporter in Lake Tahoe.

==== The end of The NHL on NBC ====
With the NBC Sports contract expiring at the end of the 2020–21 season, the league has explored the possibility of splitting its U.S. national media rights between multiple broadcasters, and over-the-top services (such as DAZN, ESPN+, or NBC's Peacock). In any case, the league aimed to surpass the US$2 billion total that NBC paid over the life of their 2011–12 to 2020–21 contract. On March 10, 2021, the NHL announced that ESPN would serve as one of the new rightsholders under a seven-year contract, which will include packages of regular season games for ESPN and ABC (including opening night, the All-Star Game, and other special events), 75 original telecasts and all out-of-market games on ESPN+, rights to half of the Stanley Cup playoffs (including one conference final per-season), and four Stanley Cup Finals over the length of the contract.

On April 26, 2021, Sports Business Journal reported that NBC had officially pulled out of bidding for future NHL rights, meaning that NBC will not televise NHL games for the first time since the 2004–05 NHL lockout. The next day, Turner Sports announced that they had agreed to a seven-year deal with the NHL to broadcast at least 72 games nationally on TNT and TBS (while also giving HBO Max the live streaming and simulcast rights to these games) beginning with the 2021–22 season, which will include three Stanley Cup Finals, the other half of the Stanley Cup playoffs, and the Winter Classic.

== ESPN and TNT Sports ==
In the years before the end of NBC's latest contract with the NHL, the league explored options for splitting its national broadcast rights, similar to the television deals of the NFL, NBA and MLB. This included selling packages to streaming services, aiming to maximize the value of its broadcast rights. On March 10, 2021, Disney, ESPN, and the NHL announced that a seven-year agreement was reached for ESPN to hold the first half of its new media rights beginning in the 2021–22 season;

- ESPN holds rights to at least 25 exclusive national games per season, which can air on either ESPN, ESPN2, or ABC, including exclusive rights to opening night games. All ABC games and select ESPN games stream on ESPN+ and, since 2025, Disney+.
- ABC aired the Thanksgiving Showdown in 2021.
- Up to 75 exclusive national games per season are streamed exclusively on ESPN+, and are not carried on linear television. These games are also available to Hulu subscribers. These games also became available for Disney+ subscribers on December 5, 2024.
- ESPN+ streams all out-of-market games, as well as on-demand versions of all nationally televised games. These games also became available for Disney+ subscribers on December 4, 2024.
- ESPN holds rights to All-Star Weekend, with the Skills Competition airing on ESPN, and the All-Star Game airing on ABC.
- ESPN holds rights to the NHL Stadium Series, since 2023 depending on scheduling logistics with TNT.
- ESPN holds rights to the NHL entry draft.
- ESPN, ESPN2, and ABC share in coverage of the Stanley Cup playoffs, holding rights to "half" of the games in the first two rounds, and one conference final per season. ESPN/ABC has the first choice of which conference final series to air. The remaining half airs on TNT and TBS.
- Exclusive rights to the Stanley Cup Final alternate between ABC and TNT; ESPN has the ability to air simulcast coverage with alternate feeds on its other channels and platforms.
- ESPN2 airs a weekly studio program dedicated to the NHL, The Point (which is hosted by John Buccigross), and ESPN holds various highlights and international rights.

On May 10, 2021, Andrew Marchand of the New York Post reported that TSN’s Ray Ferraro (who previously worked for ESPN from 2002 to 2004), and NBC’s Brian Boucher had signed with ESPN to become their top hockey analysts. On May 17, ESPN hired former Calgary Flames studio host Leah Hextall to be a regular play-by-play announcer on NHL broadcasts. She is the first woman in league history to hold that role. Hextall previously worked the 2016 World Cup of Hockey, and has worked the NCAA Division I Men's Ice Hockey Tournament for ESPN.

On June 9, 2021, ESPN announced that current New Jersey Devils defenseman P.K. Subban would be a studio analyst for the remainder of the 2021 Stanley Cup Playoffs, making his debut on SportsCenter that day. The same day, Craig Morgan, Arizona-based reporter on the Arizona Coyotes and NHL Network correspondent, reported that ESPN had added NBC's Ryan Callahan and A. J. Mleczko to their analyst roster, and that NHL Network's Kevin Weekes, who also worked for ESPN during the 2016 World Cup of Hockey, was in talks to return to ESPN in an analyst/reporter role. Marchand later reported that Weekes had signed with ESPN, and that Bob Wischusen, who currently calls play-by-play for ESPN's college football and basketball broadcasts, will also work NHL broadcasts. On June 24, ESPN officially announced that six-time Stanley Cup Champion Mark Messier had signed a multi-year deal to join ESPN in a studio analyst role. Messier's signing was the first announced signing made by ESPN, and potentially was made as a counter to TNT signing Messier's former teammate Wayne Gretzky, who was also recruited by ESPN. On June 28, Marchand reported that three time Stanley Cup Champion Chris Chelios would also join ESPN as a studio analyst. The same day, The Athletic reported that current Hockey Night in Canada color commentator/reporter Cassie Campbell-Pascall would also join ESPN.

ESPN formally confirmed its commentator teams on June 29, 2021. ESPN's college football #2 play-by-play man Sean McDonough would be the network's lead play-by-play announcer; Monday Night Football’s Steve Levy would lead studio coverage and contribute to occasional play-by-play commentary. Hextall and Wischusen were officially named as play-by-play commentators, as well as SportsCenter’s John Buccigross, who will also contribute as an alternate studio host, and serve as the host for The Point. ESPN legend Barry Melrose, Messier, Chelios, Ferraro, Boucher, Weekes, Campbell-Pascall, Callahan, Mleczko, ESPN New York’s Rick DiPietro, and 2018 gold medalist Hilary Knight would contribute as booth, ice-level, and studio analysts. 2016 Isobel Cup champion Blake Bolden was added to join insiders Emily Kaplan and Greg Wyshynski as insiders and ice-level reporters. Linda Cohn would continue her duties hosting In the Crease, while also gaining roles as an ice-level reporter and backup studio and game break host. On August 4, 2021, ESPN announced that they added most recent Blue Jackets coach and Stanley Cup winning coach John Tortorella as an extra studio analyst.

On September 16, after ESPN released their slate of games for the 2021–22 season, SportsCenter anchor and ESPN Social host Arda Ocal would announce himself that he too would host select game broadcasts. On October 2, former referee Dave Jackson joined the network as a rules analyst, an NHL first. Early into the 2021–22 season, ESPN added former NBC analyst Dominic Moore, who had hosted the expansion draft with Weekes and ESPN College Football personality Chris Fowler. Laura Rutledge, host of NFL Live and SEC Nation, joined the NHL on ESPN team for their coverage of the 2022 NHL All-Star Game, in a celebrity interviewer role. After preparing for and playing in the 2022 Winter Olympics in Beijing, Knight made her ESPN debut on the March 10, 2022 episode of “The Point”, coincidentally on the one-year anniversary of ESPN regaining the rights to broadcast the NHL. Bolden, who has been working as a pro scout for the Los Angeles Kings since 2020, made her official ESPN on-air debut on the March 17th episode of “The Point”. After the regular season kicked into high gear, Knight and Bolden were the only two who still had to make their on-air debuts with ESPN. Occasionally, other well known ESPN personalities like Jeremy Schaap, Kevin Connors, Michael Eaves, and Max McGee will be added in fill-in roles on The Point and In the Crease. Mike Monaco, Roxy Bernstein, and Caley Chelios, daughter of Chris, have also filled in on game coverage. TSN's Gord Miller, Ferraro's broadcast partner for Maple Leafs games on TSN, joined ESPN for the 2022 Stanley Cup playoffs. Tortorella left ESPN after their first season to become the new head coach of the Philadelphia Flyers. After holding two stints with ESPN during the playoffs, the network announced that Subban would be joining their coverage full-time beginning with the 2022–23 season, holding both studio analyst and color commentator roles. This came after his most recent retirement announcement.

ESPN also confirmed that Spanish language coverage of the NHL would air on ESPN Deportes; Kenneth Garay, and Eitán Benezra will be the main play-by-play commentators while Carlos Rossell and Antonio Valle contribute analysis and color commentary. Rigoberto Plascencia was later added as another play-by-play announcer.

For the 2021–22 season, ESPN aired 18 games (billed as ESPN Hockey Night), while 75 exclusive national games per season would be streamed exclusively on ESPN+. For the 2021–22 season, most of these games (billed as ESPN+ Hockey Night) aired on Tuesday and Thursday nights, with selected games on Friday nights. These games will also be available to Hulu subscribers. ESPN's first broadcasts were an opening night doubleheader, with the Pittsburgh Penguins at the defending Stanley Cup champions Tampa Bay Lightning, and the Seattle Kraken at the Vegas Golden Knights in the Kraken's first regular-season game in franchise history.

For the 2022–23 season, out-of-market games on ESPN+ – which did not carry any specific branding in the inaugural season – were branded as "NHL Power Play on ESPN+". ESPN (34) and ESPN2 (1) aired a combined at least 35 games (billed as ESPN Hockey Night), while ABC aired 15 games under the ABC Hockey Saturday package, which consisted of 4 doubleheaders, the 2023 NHL Stadium Series, and one late-season tripleheader beginning the weekend after the All-Star break.

On May 14, 2023, ESPN was widely criticized for its decision to implement a split screen between its coverage of game six of the Stanley Cup Playoff series between the Vegas Golden Knights and Edmonton Oilers and a Sunday Night Baseball telecast between the St. Louis Cardinals and Boston Red Sox, which was being played at the same time and was ultimately won by St. Louis by the score of 9-1.

For the 2023–24 season, ESPN+/Hulu airs at least 50 exclusive games. Among linear broadcasts, 19 games aired on ABC, featuring four double-headers, both NHL Stadium Series games, and two triple-headers on February 17 and April 13. ABC will also air the 2024 Stanley Cup Final. ABC Hockey Saturday for this season began on January 13, preceding Super Wild Card Saturday of the NFL playoffs, unlike past years when its slate began after the NHL All-Star Game, and ESPN air the rest.

On June 5, 2023, it was announced that Chelios' contract would not be renewed as part of Disney's $5.5 billion cost cutting. On September 12, 2023, TNT hired Boucher away from ESPN/ABC to serve as Keith Jones' replacement on the top team, thus reuniting with former NBC partners Kenny Albert and Eddie Olczyk. On October 10, 2023, ESPN announced that Barry Melrose would retire from the network to spend more time with his family after being diagnosed with Parkinson's disease. On December 19, 2023, Campbell-Pascall accepted a new position as a special advisor role with the Professional Women's Hockey League (PWHL). Although she had left Sportsnet, she will remain with ESPN/ABC.

The 2024–25 season will again have ESPN+/Hulu stream at least 50 exclusive games. ESPN2 will have a doubleheader on December 27. ABC's 19-game schedule for this season will begin earlier than normal on January 4 during the last week of the 2024 NFL regular season. The 2025 Stadium Series will be on ESPN instead of ABC. With the NHL 4 Nations Face-Off tournament replacing the All-Star Game this season, the NHL decided to split it between TNT, ABC, and ESPN: TNT will have the round-robin games on February 12 and 17, ABC/ESPN+ will air the February 15 round-robin doubleheader, and ESPN will air the United States–Finland game on February 13 and the final on February 20. On October 8, color commentator Ray Ferraro called two games of an opening night tripleheader: the St. Louis Blues at the Seattle Kraken, and the Chicago Blackhawks at the Utah Hockey Club. Two late-season Washington Capitals games were later added to ESPN's schedule in anticipation of Alexander Ovechkin breaking Wayne Gretzky's career goals record. While the April 12 road game at the Columbus Blue Jackets would air exclusively on ABC, the March 27 road game at the Minnesota Wild would co-exist with the Capitals' own broadcast via the Monumental Sports Network in the Washington metropolitan area. Additionally, the April 17 road game at the Pittsburgh Penguins would now air on both ESPN and Monumental in the Capitals' market after it was initially an ESPN-exclusive broadcast.

On April 27, 2021, Turner Sports agreed to a seven-year deal with the National Hockey League to broadcast at least 72 games nationally on TNT and TBS beginning with the 2021–22 NHL season;

- TNT holds rights to up to 72 regular season games per season. In practice these games have primarily been Wednesday-night doubleheaders (thus serving as the successor to NBCSN's Wednesday Night Hockey), with occasional games also scheduled on weekends (mostly on Sunday afternoons during the second half of the season). Other WBD networks, such as TruTV, are used as overflow in the event that a game on TNT runs long.
- TNT holds rights to the Winter Classic annually, as well as the Thanksgiving Showdown (since 2022), Stadium Series and Heritage Classic in select years.
- TNT and TBS share in coverage of the Stanley Cup playoffs with ESPN, ESPN2, and ABC, holding rights to "half" of the games in the first two rounds, and one conference final per season (ESPN/ABC will have the first choice of conference finals).
- TNT holds rights to the Stanley Cup Final in odd-numbered years beginning 2023, alternating with ABC.
- Beginning in the 2023–24 NHL season, Max began to offer simulcasts of TNT games as part of its Bleacher Report Sports add-on. The contract also includes an option for games that are exclusive to the service.
- TNT produces a studio show for its coverage, modeled after Inside the NBA.
- Bleacher Report distributes highlights on digital platforms. The site launched Open Ice, a new content brand focusing on NHL-related content. Online personality and streamer Andrew "Nasher" Telfer was hired as a contributor for the brand.

The contract was reported to be valued at $225 million per season.

On May 26, 2021, Turner announced the hiring of Wayne Gretzky as its lead studio analyst, and that NBC's top commentary team of Kenny Albert and Eddie Olczyk moved to Turner as its lead commentary team. Retired basketball player and current TNT Inside the NBA panelist Charles Barkley, who is a friend of Gretzky, was instrumental in convincing Gretzky to join Turner. Craig Morgan, an Arizona-based reporter on the Arizona Coyotes and correspondent for the NHL Network, reported that Darren Pang and Keith Jones, color commentators for the St. Louis Blues and Philadelphia Flyers, respectively, would be joining Turner. On June 9, Morgan reported that NBC's Anson Carter would be doing the same. On June 28, Marchand reported that Islanders play-by-play man Brendan Burke was in talks to join Turner as their #2 play-by-play man. On August 31, it was reported that Liam McHugh would join TNT from NBC.

On September 14, 2021, TNT announced its slate of on-air staff for its inaugural season. Jones, a studio analyst at NBC, would join Albert and Olczyk on the lead broadcast team as the lead ice-level reporter. Burke and Pang were named as the secondary broadcast team. McHugh and Carter were named to the studio team, along with former Coyotes head coach Rick Tocchet and veteran Paul Bissonnette, who all joined Gretzky in studio. Hockey Night in Canada’s Jennifer Botterill, NHL Network's Jackie Redmond, and Tarik El-Bashir also appear as contributors. TNT later added former referee Don Koharski as a rules analyst, and former Blackhawk Jamal Mayers as an extra contributor.

On November 23, TNT added retired Rangers goaltender Henrik Lundqvist to its studio panel, starting on the next day's broadcast. On November 30, TNT welcomed former referee Stéphane Auger to their team, as another rules analyst, joining Koharski. He made his debut during the Penguins-Oilers game the next night. On January 13, 2022, TNT added Nabil Karim, formerly of ESPN, to contribute as secondary studio host and reporter for both the NHL and the NBA. Former NBC and current Kraken play-by-play announcer John Forslund was picked up by TNT as a fill-in announcer, whenever Albert or Burke are on assignment. Forslund first filled in for Albert for the Avalanche-Golden Knights game on February 16, as Albert was working the Olympic women's hockey gold medal game for NBC about an hour after puck drop. Sharks color commentator Bret Hedican also joined in a fill-in role, joining Forslund in Vancouver on March 9. TNT added several announcers to their roster for the playoffs including Randy Hahn, Dave Goucher, Jim Jackson, Butch Goring, Drew Remenda, Shane Hnidy and Jody Shelley.

For the 2021–22 season, TNT aired 50 games, primarily on Wednesday nights (with 15 doubleheaders), as well as seven weeks of Sunday afternoon games in March and April 2022, and all three outdoor games (the Winter Classic, Stadium Series, and Heritage Classic). TNT's first broadcasts were a preseason doubleheader on September 30, 2021, between the Boston Bruins and Philadelphia Flyers, and the Vegas Golden Knights and Los Angeles Kings. TNT then aired its first regular season games on October 13, 2021, with a doubleheader between the New York Rangers and Washington Capitals, and the Chicago Blackhawks and Colorado Avalanche.

Due to conflicts with TNT's first two NHL doubleheaders, AEW: Dynamite was pre-empted to Saturday on the weeks of October 13 and 20. From October 27 through December 15, 2021, TNT aired only a single, 10 p.m. ET game with Dynamite as a lead-in (which concurrently began broadcasting live on both TNT's East and West feeds). TNT then began airing doubleheaders on January 5, 2022, when Dynamite moved to TBS.

In the 2022–23 season, TNT announced a 62-game regular season schedule, normally airing on Wednesdays throughout the regular season and four Sundays during March and April. In addition to gaining exclusive rights to the 2023 Stanley Cup Final and the 2023 NHL Winter Classic, TNT will gain the rights to the annual Thanksgiving Showdown on Friday, November 25, featuring a doubleheader between the Pittsburgh Penguins and the Philadelphia Flyers, and the St. Louis Blues at the Tampa Bay Lightning. With the NBA opting not to play games on Election Day, TNT decided to schedule a rare Tuesday night doubleheader on November 8, with the Edmonton Oilers at the Tampa Bay Lightning, followed by the Nashville Predators at the Seattle Kraken. Like their playoff coverage in 2022, TNT brought in regional announcers for select games. Those include former Kings (current at the time) and NBC play-by-play man Alex Faust and Lightning play-by-play man Dave Randorf, previously of TSN and Sportsnet. Unlike the previous season, select TNT broadcasts would air on a non-exclusive basis, and are blacked out in the local markets of the participating teams in favor of local broadcasters. On January 23, Tocchet left TNT to be the new head coach of the Vancouver Canucks, replacing recently-fired Bruce Boudreau. He subsequently returned to TNT as a guest studio analyst after the Canucks missed the playoffs. On May 11, 2023, Jones was named the President of Hockey Operations for the Philadelphia Flyers after the 2023 Stanley Cup playoffs concludes.

During the first round of the 2023 Stanley Cup playoffs, TNT only carried weekend games due to its commitments with the NBA playoffs, with some weeknight games airing on TBS alongside ESPN. To maximize viewership, the 2023 Stanley Cup Final was simulcast on TBS and/or TruTV (notwithstanding commitments to MLB on TBS Tuesday Night and AEW Dynamite).

On August 29, 2023, TNT hired Brian Boucher away from ESPN to replace Keith Jones on the lead team, thus reuniting with former NBC partners Kenny Albert and Eddie Olczyk, a position that was confirmed on September 21 with entire TNT crew returning and Henrik Lundqvist being added to the crew full-time.

TNT aired a 62-game schedule for the 2023–24 season, 48 of those games on Wednesdays as doubleheaders, and 12 of those games on Sunday afternoons (with the first branded as Hockey Day in America—reviving the franchise that had been used by NBC), along with the 2023 Heritage Classic in Edmonton (which aired on TBS as its first regular-season game (due to TNT commitments to a United States women's soccer friendly against Colombia), the Thanksgiving Showdown, and the 2024 NHL Winter Classic.

On November 7, 2023, TNT announced that Chris Chelios, formerly of ESPN, would serve as a guest analyst for that night's doubleheader. Chelios joined a rotation of guest studio analysts that later included Tony Granato and Craig Berube. On January 17, 2024, due to the weather-related postponement of the Chicago Blackhawks–Buffalo Sabres game, TNT instead aired the Detroit Red Wings at the Florida Panthers, with the studio team calling the game from the TNT studios.

TruTV aired multiple alternative broadcasts throughout the season; the February 14 Panthers–Penguins game featured an alternate broadcast with Paul Bissonnette and the panel of his podcast Spittin' Chiclets. On the April 14 Avalanche–Golden Knights game, TruTV aired MultiVersus NHL Face-Off –a tie-in for the Warner Bros. Games-published crossover fighting game MultiVersus. The broadcast featured a 3D animated recreation of the game with players represented by avatars of characters from Adult Swim, Cartoon Network, DC Comics, and Warner Bros. Animation franchises. The broadcast was modeled after ESPN's previous Big City Greens-themed broadcasts, with its technology vendor Beyond Sports also being involved in the broadcast. During the 2024 Western Conference finals, TruTV will air NHL DataCast powered by AWS—an alternate broadcast with enhanced statistics. The feed will feature Steve Mears, Colby Armstrong, and Mike Kelly of NHL Network as commentators.

Another set of 62 games is scheduled for TNT's 2024–25 regular season coverage, including Wednesday night games throughout the season, the Thanksgiving Showdown, the 2025 Winter Classic, and Sunday games between late February and April. TruTV will continue to have simulcasts or alternative broadcasts of selected games. With the NHL 4 Nations Face-Off tournament replacing the All-Star Game this season, the NHL decided to split it between TNT, ABC, and ESPN: TNT will have the round-robin games on February 12 and 17, ABC/ESPN+ will air the February 15 round-robin doubleheader, and ESPN will air the United States–Finland game on February 13 and the final on February 20. The New York Rangers–Philadelphia Flyers game on April 9 would be called by the legendary Rangers broadcast duo of Sam Rosen and John Davidson; this was due to Rosen's impending retirement from broadcasting NHL games after the season.
