= NHL on TNT =

NHL hockey cable telecasts (2021–present)

- Logo since 2026
- Also known as: NHL on TNT Sports
- Genre: Live sports telecast
- Presented by: Kenny Albert; Eddie Olczyk; Brian Boucher; Jackie Redmond; Brendan Burke; Jennifer Botterill; Darren Pang; Liam McHugh; Anson Carter; Paul Bissonnette; Wayne Gretzky; Henrik Lundqvist
- Theme music composer: Mark Willott
- Country of origin: United States
- Original language: English

Production
- Production locations: Various NHL arenas (game telecasts); Techwood Studios, Atlanta, GA (game-time studio segments and other productions)
- Camera setup: Multi-camera
- Running time: 210 minutes or until game ends (inc. adverts)
- Production company: TNT Sports

Original release
- Network: TNT; TBS; TruTV (simulcasts, alternate broadcasts and overflow); HLN (overflow); HBO Max
- Release: September 30, 2021 – present

Related
- NHL on CBS; NHL on ESPN/NHL on ABC (American rightsholders); NHL on Sportsnet (Canadian rightsholders); NHL on Prime Video (Canadian rightsholders)

The NHL on TNT is a presentation of the National Hockey League (NHL) games produced by TNT Sports (formerly known as Turner Sports), and televised on TNT and streamed on HBO Max in the United States.

In 2021, Turner Sports reached a seven-year contract to serve as one of the two rightsholders of the NHL in the United States, alongside ESPN/ABC, with both replacing NBC Sports. TNT will hold rights "up to 72" nationally televised regular-season games per season, the annual NHL Winter Classic game on New Year's Day, half of the Stanley Cup playoffs (airing on TNT and sister channel TBS), and hold rights to the Stanley Cup Final in odd-numbered years. The contract also includes an option for HBO Max to carry and/or simulcast games.

Turner Sports has previously aired hockey, as the regional home for the Atlanta Flames and Atlanta Thrashers, and as the cable home for Olympic ice hockey from 1992–1998 for CBS. The formerly co-owned AT&T SportsNet regional sports networks also used to hold local rights until the 2022–23 season to the Pittsburgh Penguins (which went to SportsNet Pittsburgh), Seattle Kraken (which went to over the air channels KING-TV and KONG-TV), and Vegas Golden Knights (which went to over-the-air channel Vegas 34). However, Turner Sports had never had a national contract with the NHL until the current deal was reached.

Like other U.S. national NHL broadcasts, NHL on TNT games may be available in Canada on Sportsnet or streamed on Sportsnet+ as part of a 12-year agreement with the NHL that lasts to the end of the 2025-26 season (it was later extended another 12 years to 2037–38 season), subject to blackout restrictions if a Canadian team is involved in the TNT broadcasts.

== History ==
=== Prior to a national contract ===
From 1992–1998, TNT served as the American cable television partner for CBS in its coverage of the Winter Olympic Games. Jiggs McDonald handled the play-by-play for ice hockey at the 1992 and 1994 Olympics with Bill Clement on color commentary in 1992 and Joe Micheletti in 1994. In 1998, Mike "Doc" Emrick provided the play-by-play commentary alongside color commentators Peter McNab, Joe Micheletti, and Digit Murphy.

When the NHL's media rights were up for renewal in 2011, Turner Sports was reported to have been among the bidders (with Sports Business Journal suggesting that Turner would want to pick it up for TruTV to expand its sports output alongside the NCAA men's basketball tournament), alongside past NHL rightsholders Fox Sports and ESPN. The NHL ultimately decided to renew its rights with NBC Sports under a 10-year deal, taking advantage of the acquisition of its parent company NBC Universal by Comcast—the existing cable rightsholder via Versus.

=== National contract (2021–present) ===
To increase the value of its U.S. media rights after the expiration of its ten-year deal with NBC Sports, the NHL pursued having multiple media partners for its next round of media rights deals, including possible deals with streaming services. After announcing on March 10, 2021, that ESPN would hold the first half of the new media rights, on April 27, the NHL announced that a seven-year agreement was reached for Turner Sports to hold the second half of its new media rights beginning in the 2021–22 season:

- TNT holds rights to up to 72 regular season games per season. In practice these games have primarily been Wednesday-night doubleheaders (thus serving as the successor to NBCSN's Wednesday Night Hockey), with occasional games also scheduled on weekends (mostly on Sunday afternoons during the second half of the season). Other WBD networks, such as TruTV, are used as overflow in the event that a game on TNT runs long.
- TNT holds rights to the Winter Classic annually, as well as the Thanksgiving Showdown (since 2022), Stadium Series and Heritage Classic in select years.
- TNT and TBS share in coverage of the Stanley Cup playoffs with ESPN, ESPN2, and ABC, holding rights to "half" the games in the first two rounds, and one conference final per season (ESPN/ABC will have the first choice of conference finals). From 2022 to 2025, TNT was given the Western Conference Final in even-numbered years, and Eastern Conference Final in odd-numbered years; in 2026, they would be given the Eastern Conference Final in back-to-back years.
- TNT holds rights to the Stanley Cup Final in odd-numbered years beginning 2023, alternating with ABC.
- Beginning in the 2023–24 NHL season, Max began to offer simulcasts of TNT games as part of its Bleacher Report Sports add-on. The contract also includes an option for games that are exclusive to the service.
- TNT produces a studio show for its coverage, modeled after Inside the NBA.
- Bleacher Report distributes highlights on digital platforms. The site launched Open Ice, a new content brand focusing on NHL-related content. Online personality and streamer Andrew "Nasher" Telfer was hired as a contributor for the brand.
- TNT holds rights to the NHL Awards show in odd-numbered years altering with ESPN.

The contract was reported to be valued at $225 million per season.

On May 26, 2021, Turner announced the hiring of Wayne Gretzky as its lead studio analyst, and that NBC's top commentary team of Kenny Albert and Eddie Olczyk moved to Turner as its lead commentary team. Retired basketball player and current Inside the NBA panelist Charles Barkley, who is a friend of Gretzky, was instrumental in convincing Gretzky to join Turner. Craig Morgan, an Arizona-based reporter on the Arizona Coyotes and correspondent for the NHL Network, reported that Darren Pang and Keith Jones, color commentators for the St. Louis Blues and Philadelphia Flyers, respectively, would be joining Turner. On June 9, Morgan reported that NBC's Anson Carter would be doing the same. On June 28, Marchand reported that Islanders play-by-play man Brendan Burke was in talks to join Turner as their #2 play-by-play man. On August 31, it was reported that Liam McHugh would join TNT from NBC.

On September 14, 2021, TNT announced its slate of on-air staff for its inaugural season. Jones, a studio analyst at NBC, would join Albert and Olczyk on the lead broadcast team as the lead ice-level reporter. Burke and Pang were named as the secondary broadcast team. McHugh and Carter were named to the studio team, along with former Coyotes head coach Rick Tocchet and veteran Paul Bissonnette, who all joined Gretzky in studio. Hockey Night in Canada’s Jennifer Botterill, NHL Network's Jackie Redmond, and Tarik El-Bashir also appear as contributors. TNT later added former referee Don Koharski as a rules analyst, and former Blackhawk Jamal Mayers as an extra contributor.

On November 23, TNT added retired Rangers goaltender Henrik Lundqvist to its studio panel, starting on the next day's broadcast. On November 30, TNT welcomed former referee Stéphane Auger to their team, as another rules analyst, joining Koharski. He made his debut during the Penguins-Oilers game the next night. On January 13, 2022, TNT added Nabil Karim, formerly of ESPN, to contribute as secondary studio host and reporter for both the NHL and NBA. Former NBC and current Kraken play-by-play announcer John Forslund was picked up by TNT as a fill-in announcer, whenever Albert or Burke are on assignment. Forslund first filled in for Albert for the Avalanche-Golden Knights game on February 16, as Albert was working the Olympic women's hockey gold medal game for NBC about an hour after puck drop. Sharks color commentator Bret Hedican also joined in a fill-in role, joining Forslund in Vancouver on March 9. TNT added several announcers to their roster for the playoffs including Randy Hahn, Dave Goucher, Jim Jackson, Butch Goring, Drew Remenda, Shane Hnidy and Jody Shelley.

Logo from 2021 to 2026

For the 2021–22 season, TNT aired 50 games, primarily on Wednesday nights (with 15 doubleheaders), as well as seven weeks of Sunday afternoon games in March and April 2022, and all three outdoor games (the Winter Classic, Stadium Series, and Heritage Classic). TNT's first broadcasts were a preseason doubleheader on September 30, 2021, between the Boston Bruins and Philadelphia Flyers, and the Vegas Golden Knights and Los Angeles Kings. TNT then aired its first regular season games on October 13, 2021, with a doubleheader between the New York Rangers and Washington Capitals, and the Chicago Blackhawks and Colorado Avalanche.

Due to conflicts with TNT's first two NHL doubleheaders, AEW Dynamite was pre-empted to Saturday on the weeks of October 13 and 20. From October 27 through December 15, 2021, TNT aired only a single, 10 p.m. ET game with Dynamite as a lead-in (which concurrently began broadcasting live on both TNT's East and West feeds). Dynamite then moved to TBS on January 5, 2022, allowing TNT to air regular Wednesday doubleheaders.

In the 2022–23 season, TNT announced a 62-game regular season schedule, normally airing on Wednesdays throughout the regular season and four Sundays during March and April. In addition to gaining exclusive rights to the 2023 Stanley Cup Final and the 2023 NHL Winter Classic, TNT will gain the rights to the annual Thanksgiving Showdown on Friday, November 25, featuring a doubleheader between the Pittsburgh Penguins and the Philadelphia Flyers, and the St. Louis Blues at the Tampa Bay Lightning. With the NBA opting not to play games on Election Day, TNT decided to schedule a rare Tuesday night doubleheader on November 8, with the Edmonton Oilers at Tampa Bay Lightning, followed by the Nashville Predators at Seattle Kraken. Like their playoff coverage in 2022, TNT brought in regional announcers for select games. Those include former Kings (current at the time) and NBC play-by-play man Alex Faust and Lightning play-by-play man Dave Randorf, previously of TSN and Sportsnet. Unlike the previous season, select TNT broadcasts would air on a non-exclusive basis, and are blacked out in the local markets of the participating teams in favor of local broadcasters. On January 23, Tocchet left TNT to be the new head coach of the Vancouver Canucks, replacing the recently fired Bruce Boudreau. He subsequently returned to TNT as a guest studio analyst after the Canucks missed the playoffs. On May 11, 2023, Jones was named the President of Hockey Operations for the Philadelphia Flyers after the 2023 Stanley Cup playoffs concludes.

During the first round of the 2023 Stanley Cup playoffs, TNT only carried weekend games due to its commitments with the NBA playoffs, with some weeknight games airing on TBS alongside ESPN. To maximize viewership, the 2023 Stanley Cup Final was simulcast on TBS and/or TruTV (notwithstanding commitments to MLB on TBS Tuesday Night and AEW Dynamite).

On August 29, 2023, TNT hired Brian Boucher away from ESPN to replace Keith Jones on the lead team, thus reuniting with former NBC partners Kenny Albert and Eddie Olczyk, a position that was confirmed on September 21 with the entire TNT crew returning and Henrik Lundqvist being added to the crew full-time.

TNT aired a 62-game schedule for the 2023–24 season, 48 of those games on Wednesdays as doubleheaders, and 12 of those games on Sunday afternoons (with the first branded as Hockey Day in America—reviving the franchise that had been used by NBC), along with the 2023 Heritage Classic in Edmonton (which aired on TBS as its first regular-season game (due to TNT commitments to a United States women's soccer friendly against Colombia), the Thanksgiving Showdown, and the 2024 NHL Winter Classic.

On November 7, 2023, TNT announced that Chris Chelios, formerly of ESPN, would serve as a guest analyst for that night's doubleheader. Chelios joined a rotation of guest studio analysts that later included Tony Granato and Craig Berube. On January 17, 2024, due to the weather-related postponement of the Chicago Blackhawks–Buffalo Sabres game, TNT instead aired the Detroit Red Wings at Florida Panthers, with the studio team calling the game from the TNT studios.

TruTV aired multiple alternative broadcasts throughout the season; the February 14 Panthers–Penguins game featured an alternate broadcast with Paul Bissonnette and the panel of his podcast Spittin' Chiclets. On the April 14 Avalanche–Golden Knights game, TruTV aired MultiVersus NHL Face-Off –a tie-in for the Warner Bros. Games-published crossover fighting game MultiVersus. The broadcast featured a 3D animated recreation of the game with players represented by avatars of characters from Adult Swim, Cartoon Network, DC Comics, and Warner Bros. Animation franchises. The broadcast was modeled after ESPN's previous Big City Greens-themed broadcasts, with its technology vendor Beyond Sports also being involved in the broadcast. During the 2024 Western Conference finals, TruTV aired the NHL DataCast powered by AWS—an alternate broadcast with enhanced statistics. The feed featured Steve Mears, Colby Armstrong, and Mike Kelly of NHL Network as commentators.

Another set of 62 games is scheduled for TNT's 2024–25 regular season coverage, including Wednesday night games throughout the season, the Thanksgiving Showdown, the 2025 Winter Classic, and Sunday games between late February and April. TruTV will continue to have simulcasts or alternative broadcasts of selected games. With the NHL 4 Nations Face-Off tournament replacing the All-Star Game this season, the NHL decided to split it between TNT, ABC, and ESPN: TNT will have the round-robin games on February 12 and 17, ABC/ESPN+ will air the February 15 round-robin doubleheader, and ESPN will air the United States–Finland game on February 13 and the final on February 20. The New York Rangers–Philadelphia Flyers game on April 9 would be called by the legendary Rangers broadcast duo of Sam Rosen and John Davidson; this was due to Rosen's impending retirement from broadcasting NHL games after the season.

A 72-game slate for TNT was announced ahead of the 2025–26 regular season, including Wednesday night games throughout the season, the Thanksgiving Showdown, the 2026 NHL Winter Classic, and Sunday games between March 1 and April 12. A total of 14 Tuesday night games, one game on Thursday night and a doubleheader on Martin Luther King Jr. Day were also added, following the NBA moving its secondary national TV partner from TNT to NBC and Peacock and Prime Video. This includes a tripleheader on December 23.

For the 2026–27 season, TNT is slated to air 72 regular season games, including Wednesday night games throughout the season, the 2026 Heritage Classic, the Thanksgiving Showdown, the 2027 NHL Winter Classic, and Sunday games from February 21 to April 4. Additionally, TNT would air 12 games on Tuesday night, five games on Thursday night, four games on Friday night, and three games on Monday night including a Martin Luther King Jr. Day doubleheader on January 18. A tripleheader is scheduled on March 14. From November 16 to 18, TNT presented an "Original Six Series", featuring three all-Original Six matchups. November 16 featured the Montreal Canadiens at New York Rangers, followed by the November 17 matchup between the Toronto Maple Leafs and Chicago Blackhawks. The final game of the series featured the Boston Bruins at Detroit Red Wings on November 18. Each game commemorated the 100th anniversary of the first games played by the Rangers, Blackhawks and Red Wings.

== Coverage on other networks ==
TNT Sports-produced hockey has also aired on other networks.

=== TBS ===
For a short period in the 1970s, WTCG, the predecessor to TBS, was the television home of the Atlanta Flames. All of the Flames' radio and television broadcasts were simulcasts. The Flames' games were also broadcast on the radio by WSB (AM). Jiggs McDonald was the main play-by-play announcer with Skip Caray substituting from 1976–80. Color commentators included Andy Still (1972-73), Bob Neal (1973–74), Ed Thilenius (1974–75; home and televised games only), Bernie Geoffrion (1975–79), and Bobby Harper (1979–80; home games only). Pete Van Wieren also did play-by-play for the Flames. The Flames left Atlanta for Calgary prior to the 1980–81 NHL season and McDonald left Atlanta to work for the New York Islanders.

As part of TNT's seven-year NHL national contract, select Stanley Cup playoff games air on TBS. In 2023, TBS aired the Heritage Classic, its first regular season game. While TBS's playoff games initially featured TBS branding replacing that of TNT, since the 2023–24 season all NHL broadcasts now carry "TNT Sports" branding regardless of channel due to corporate branding changes.

=== Turner South ===
Turner launched the regional Turner South network in 1999, which carried games of the Atlanta Thrashers, which were owned at that time by Turner parent Time Warner. Matt McConnell was the primary television play-by-play announcer for the Thrashers from 1999–2003 with JP Dellacamera taking over for the rest of the way in Atlanta. Darren Eliot was the television color commentator throughout the Thrashers' entire existence before their 2011 departure to Winnipeg as the Jets. Time Warner sold the Thrashers in 2003, and sold Turner South to Fox Cable Networks in 2006, which merged it with FSN South to form SportSouth.

=== AT&T SportsNet ===
Following AT&T's acquisition of Time Warner in 2018, AT&T SportsNet,—a regional sports network system acquired in 2015 as a part of DirecTV, and formerly part of the Fox Sports Networks (FSN) group—was moved alongside Turner Sports within the WarnerMedia News & Sports division under Jeff Zucker in March 2019. AT&T SportsNet Pittsburgh, AT&T SportsNet Rocky Mountain, and Root Sports Northwest (majority owned by the Seattle Mariners) served as the regional outlets for the Pittsburgh Penguins, Vegas Golden Knights, and Seattle Kraken, respectively.

With the exception of Root Sports Northwest, all of WBD's regional sports networks would be dissolved at the end of the 2023 Major League Baseball season. The Golden Knights signed a multi-year agreement with the E. W. Scripps Company's Scripps Sports division to start airing games on Scripps's Las Vegas broadcast station KMCC and syndicate the telecasts to other stations across the team's broadcast territory. Meanwhile, AT&T SportsNet Pittsburgh, the television home of the Penguins, was purchased by the Fenway Sports Group, which also owns the Boston Bruins' home network, NESN. The network dropped the AT&T branding and became known as simply SportsNet Pittsburgh (not to be confused with Canada's Sportsnet networks) effective October 2. In January 2024, the Mariners purchased WBD's remaining stake on Root Sports Northwest. As a result, the Kraken left Root Sports Northwest following the season and partnered with Tegna Inc. (as the Kraken Hockey Network) to air its games via flagship broadcast station KONG-TV and streaming partner Amazon Prime Video.

== Production ==
A Turner Sports executive stated that TNT's goal for its coverage was to provide information on-air that would appeal to both mainstream viewers and "diehard fans", including leveraging the NHL's new player and puck tracking system for on-air features and graphics, and high frame rate cameras. The network also implemented an on-ice graphic for the power play clock, similar to the on-court shot clock graphic used in TNT's NBA coverage. TNT's studio coverage originates from Turner's headquarters in Atlanta, with a set featuring projection mapping effects.

== On-air staff ==
=== Studio personalities ===
- Liam McHugh: lead studio host (2021–present)
- Nabil Karim: alternate rinkside reporter and studio host (2022–present)
- Anson Carter: lead studio analyst (2021–present)
- Paul Bissonnette: lead studio analyst (2021–present)
- Wayne Gretzky: lead studio analyst (2021–present)
- Henrik Lundqvist: lead studio analyst (2023–present); rotating studio analyst (2021–2023)

=== Rotating studio analysts ===
- Darren Pang: #2 ice-level analyst and rotating studio analyst (2021–present);
- Jennifer Botterill: #2 color commentator and rotating studio analyst (2021–present); Ice-level analyst (2021–22; 2024)
- Colby Armstrong: alternate color commentator/ice-level analyst and rotating studio analyst (2022–present)
- Brian Boucher: lead ice-level analyst, occasional color commentator, and rotating studio analyst (2023–present)
- Chris Chelios: rotating studio analyst (2023–present)
- Tony Granato: rotating studio analyst and playoffs color commentator (2024–present)
- Tuukka Rask: rotating studio analyst (2025–present)
- Bruce Cassidy: rotating studio analyst (2026-present)

=== Play-by-play ===
- Kenny Albert: lead play-by-play (2021–present)
- Brendan Burke: #2 play-by-play (2021–present)
- John Forslund: #3 play-by-play (2022–present)
- Alex Faust: #4 play-by-play (2022–present)
- Randy Hahn: Playoffs play-by-play (2022–2024, 2026–present)
- Steve Mears: alternate play-by-play and rinkside reporter (2024–present)

=== Color commentators ===
- Eddie Olczyk: lead color commentator (2021–present)
- Brian Boucher: lead ice-level analyst, occasional color commentator, and rotating studio analyst (2023–present)
- Jennifer Botterill: #2 color commentator and rotating studio analyst (2021–present); Ice-level analyst (2021–22; 2024)
- Butch Goring: alternate color commentator (2022, 2025–present)
- Colby Armstrong: alternate color commentator/ice-level analyst and rotating studio analyst (2022–present)
- Tony Granato: rotating studio analyst and playoffs color commentator (2024–present)
- Shane Hnidy: alternate color commentator and ice-level analyst (2022–present)
- Jody Shelley: alternate color commentator and ice-level analyst (2022–present)
- Mike Kelly: DataCast analyst (2024–present)
- Drew Remenda: Playoffs color commentator (2022, 2026)

=== Ice-level analysts ===
- Brian Boucher: lead ice-level analyst, occasional color commentator, and rotating studio analyst (2023–present)
- Darren Pang: #2 ice-level analyst and fill-in studio analyst (2021–present);
- Shane Hnidy: alternate color commentator and ice-level analyst (2022–present)
- Jody Shelley: alternate color commentator and ice-level analyst (2022–present)
- Jean-Luc Grand-Pierre: alternate ice-level analyst (2022–present)
- Colby Armstrong: alternate color commentator/ice-level analyst, and rotating studio analyst (2022–present)
- Chris Mason: alternate ice-level analyst (2025–present)

=== Rinkside reporters ===
- Jackie Redmond: lead rinkside reporter (2022–present)
- Tarik El-Bashir: #2 rinkside reporter (2021–present)
- Alyson Lozoff: alternate rinkside reporter (2022–present)
- Nabil Karim: alternate rinkside reporter and studio host (2022–present)
- Erika Wachter: Playoffs rinkside reporter (2022; 2025)
- Kathryn Tappen: alternate rinkside reporter (2022–present)
- Meaghan Mikkelson: alternate rinkside reporter (2022; 2024–present); Playoffs ice-level analyst (2022)
- Steve Mears: alternate play-by-play and rinkside reporter (2024–present)
- Lauren Jbara: alternate rinkside reporter (2025–present)

=== Former personalities ===
- Rick Tocchet: lead studio analyst (2021–2023)
- Sarah Nurse: guest studio analyst (2023)
- Rick Bowness: studio analyst (2024–2026)
- Jon Cooper: Playoffs guest studio analyst (2023; 2024)
- Craig Berube: guest studio analyst (2024)
- Keith Yandle: rotating studio analyst (2022–2024)
- Josh Bogorad: alternate play-by-play (2024)
- Dave Randorf: alternate play-by-play (2022–2023)
- Sam Rosen: alternate play-by-play (2025)
- Dave Goucher: Playoffs play-by-play (2022)
- Rick Ball: Playoffs play-by-play (2023)
- John Davidson: alternate color commentator (2025)
- Bret Hedican: alternate color commentator (2022–2024)
- Patrick Sharp: Playoffs color commentator and ice-level analyst (2023)
- Keith Jones: lead ice-level analyst, occasional color commentator, and studio analyst (2021–2023)
- Jamal Mayers: fill-in ice-level analyst (2021)
- Mike McKenna: Playoffs ice-level analyst (2022)
- Darren Eliot: Playoffs ice-level analyst (2022; 2024)
- Bryce Salvador: Playoffs ice-level analyst (2022–2024)
- Taryn Hatcher: Playoffs rinkside reporter (2022)
- Shannon Hogan: Playoffs rinkside reporter (2022)
- Julie Stewart-Binks: Playoffs rinkside reporter (2022)
- Don Koharski: lead rules analyst (2021–2023)
- Stéphane Auger: alternate rules analyst (2021–2022)
- Brad Meier: alternate rules analyst (2023)
- Jim Jackson: Playoffs play-by-play (2022–2025)
- Ashali Vise: alternate rinkside reporter (2022; 2024–2025)

== See also ==
- National Hockey League on television
- NHL on SportsChannel America

Records
Preceded by OLN/Versus/NBCSN	NHL pay television carrier in the United States; 2021–present with ESPN	Succeeded by Incumbent
