= Wednesday Night Rivalry =

2013–2021 National Hockey League games on NBCSN

- NBCSN's Wednesday Night Hockey logo since 2018
- Also known as: Wednesday Night Hockey
- Genre: NHL game telecasts
- Presented by: Mike Emrick; Kenny Albert; Eddie Olczyk; Brian Boucher; John Forslund; Joe Micheletti; Pierre McGuire; Brendan Burke; A. J. Mleczko; Liam McHugh; Kathryn Tappen; Keith Jones; Patrick Sharp; Anson Carter; Mike Babcock; Ryan Callahan; Dominic Moore
- Country of origin: United States
- Original language: English
- No. of seasons: 9 (Overall); 6 (Wednesday Night Rivalry); 3 (Wednesday Night Hockey)
- No. of episodes: 87

Production
- Camera setup: Multi-camera
- Running time: 180 minutes or until game ends
- Production company: NBC Sports

Original release
- Network: NBCSN; NHL Network (overflow doubleheaders only); TSN2 (2013-2014, non-Canadian games only); Sportsnet (2014-2021)
- Release: January 23, 2013 – May 12, 2021

Related
- NHL on NBC

Wednesday Night Rivalry and Wednesday Night Hockey was the branding used for National Hockey League games that aired on NBCSN on Wednesday nights during the regular season from January 2013 to May 2021.

In the 2012–13 NHL season, NBCSN rebranded their coverage of Wednesday night games as Wednesday Night Rivalry. It primarily featured rivalry games, although the network has received criticism for games which do not seem to include a strong element of rivalry (such as Los Angeles-Detroit, Pittsburgh-Buffalo, and Chicago-Philadelphia) are common. NBCSN sometimes produces a Wednesday Nightcap game primarily featuring Western Conference teams immediately following their Wednesday Night Rivalry game. Beginning in the 2013–14 NHL season, NBCSN aired the series NHL Rivals, which looks back at the participating teams' historic rivalry, leading up to their Wednesday Night Rivalry game. That same season, NBCSN promoted the games with the slogan "The Night You Love To Hate".

Beginning with the 2018–19 NHL season, NBC Sports rebranded its Wednesday night broadcasts of the NHL as Wednesday Night Hockey, with the focus shifting from rivalry games to powerhouse teams and top NHL stars. The first season of Wednesday Night Hockey featured more West Coast games and a few matchups featuring Canadian teams.

== Results ==
=== 2012–13 season (before the lockout) ===
Date	Time	Away team	Home team
October 17, 2012	7:30 P.M.	N.Y. Rangers	New Jersey
October 24, 2012	7:30 P.M.	New Jersey	Buffalo
October 31, 2012	7:30 P.M.	Pittsburgh	Washington
November 7, 2012 (Note: This game would have also aired on TSN in Canada as part of TSN's Wednesday Night Hockey coverage.)	7:30 P.M.	Pittsburgh	Toronto
November 14, 2012	7:30 P.M.	Washington	N.Y. Rangers
November 21, 2012	7:30 P.M	Tampa Bay	Carolina
November 28, 2012	8 P.M.	Chicago	Minnesota
December 5, 2012	7:30 P.M.	N.Y. Rangers	Washington
December 12, 2012	8 P.M.	Minnesota	St. Louis
December 19, 2012	7:30 P.M.	New Jersey	Philadelphia
December 26, 2012	7:30 P.M.	Washington	Buffalo
January 2, 2013	8 P.M.	N.Y. Rangers	Chicago
January 9, 2013	7:30 P.M.	Boston	Buffalo
January 16, 2013	8 P.M.	St. Louis	Chicago
January 23, 2013	8 P.M.	Colorado	Dallas
January 30, 2013 (Note: The game would have also aired in English on TSN and French on RDS, over in Canada.)	7:30 P.M.	Montréal	Detroit
February 6, 2013	7:30 P.M.	Buffalo	Boston
February 13, 2013	7:30 P.M.	Chicago	Detroit
February 20, 2013	7:30 P.M.	Philadelphia	Pittsburgh
February 27, 2013	7:30 P.M.	Washington	Philadelphia
March 6, 2013	8 P.M.	Colorado	Chicago
March 13, 2013	7:30 P.M.	Philadelphia	New Jersey
March 20, 2013	7:30 P.M.	N.Y. Rangers	Detroit
March 27, 2013	7:30 P.M.	Montréal	Boston
April 3, 2013	7:30 P.M.	Pittsburgh	N.Y. Rangers
April 10, 2013	7:30 P.M.	Boston	New Jersey

=== 2012–13 season (after the lockout) ===
Date	Time	Away team	Score	Home team	Score
January 23, 2013	7:30 P.M.	Boston	3	N.Y. Rangers	4 (OT)
January 30, 2013	8 P.M.	Chicago	2	Minnesota	3 (SO)
February 6, 2013	7:30 P.M.	Boston	2	Montréal	1
February 13, 2013	7:30 P.M.	St. Louis	4 (SO)	Detroit	3
February 20, 2013	7:30 P.M.	Philadelphia	6	Pittsburgh	5
February 20, 2013	10 P.M.	St. Louis	0	Colorado	1 (OT)
February 27, 2013	7:30 P.M.	Washington	1	Philadelphia	4
February 27, 2013	10 P.M. (Note: Blacked out in the Detroit and Los Angeles markets. Game was televised locally on Fox Sports Detroit and Fox Sports West.)	Detroit	1	Los Angeles	2
March 6, 2013	8 P.M.	Colorado	2	Chicago	3
March 13, 2013	7:30 P.M.	Philadelphia	2	New Jersey	5
March 20, 2013	7:30 P.M.	Minnesota	4	Detroit	2
March 27, 2013	7:30 P.M.	Montréal	6 (SO)	Boston	5
April 3, 2013	7:30 P.M.	Pittsburgh	1	N.Y. Rangers	6
April 10, 2013	7:30 P.M.	Boston	5	New Jersey	4
April 17, 2013	7:30 P.M.	Buffalo	3 (SO)	Boston	2
April 24, 2013	7:30 P.M.	Los Angeles	1	Detroit	3

=== 2013–14 season ===
Date	Time	Away team	Score	Home team	Score
October 2, 2013	8 P.M.	Buffalo	1	Detroit	2
October 9, 2013	8 P.M.	Chicago	2	St. Louis	3
October 16, 2013	8 P.M.	N.Y. Rangers	2	Washington	0
October 23, 2013	8 P.M.	Boston	5	Buffalo	2
October 30, 2013	8 P.M.	Boston	2	Pittsburgh	3
November 6, 2013	7:30 P.M.	Pittsburgh	1	N.Y. Rangers	5
November 13, 2013	8 P.M.	Philadelphia	2	Pittsburgh	1
November 20, 2013	8 P.M.	Pittsburgh	4	Washington	0
November 27, 2013	7:30 P.M.	Boston	1	Detroit	6
December 4, 2013	8 P.M.	Philadelphia	6	Detroit	3
December 11, 2013	8 P.M.	Philadelphia	2	Chicago	7
December 18, 2013	8 P.M.	Pittsburgh	4 (SO)	N.Y. Rangers	3
January 8, 2014	8 P.M.	N.Y. Rangers	3	Chicago	2
January 15, 2014	8 P.M.	Washington	3	Pittsburgh	4
January 22, 2014	8 P.M.	Chicago	4	Detroit	5 (SO)
January 29, 2014	7:30 P.M.	N.Y. Rangers	2	N.Y. Islanders	1
February 5, 2014	7:30 P.M.	Pittsburgh	5	Buffalo	1
February 26, 2014	7:30 P.M.	Boston	4	Buffalo	5 (OT)
February 26, 2014	10 P.M.	Los Angeles	6	Colorado	4
March 5, 2014	8 P.M.	Washington	4	Philadelphia	6
March 12, 2014	7:30 P.M.	Boston	4	Montréal	1
March 19, 2014	8 P.M.	St. Louis	0	Chicago	4
March 26, 2014	8 P.M.	Philadelphia	1	N.Y. Rangers	3
April 2, 2014	8 P.M.	Boston	2	Detroit	3
April 2, 2014	10:30 P.M.	Phoenix	0	Los Angeles	4
April 9, 2014	8 P.M.	Detroit	3	Pittsburgh	4 (SO)
April 9, 2014	10:30 P.M.	San Jose	2	Anaheim	5

=== 2014–15 season ===
After Bell Media lost NHL rights to Rogers Communications, TSN's Bob McKenzie and Darren Dreger begin to make appearances on Wednesday Night Rivalry as NHL insiders every pregame and first intermission.

Date	Time	Away team	Score	Home team	Score
October 8, 2014	7:30 P.M.	Philadelphia	1	Boston	2
October 8, 2014	10 P.M.	San Jose	4	Los Angeles	0
October 15, 2014	8 P.M.	Boston	3 (SO)	Detroit	2
October 22, 2014	8 P.M.	Philadelphia	5	Pittsburgh	3
October 29, 2014	7:30 P.M.	Detroit	4	Washington	2
November 5, 2014	8 P.M.	Detroit	3	N.Y. Rangers	4 (OT)
November 12, 2014	8 P.M. (Note: This game was also shown over on Sportsnet as part of Sportsnet's Wednesday Night Hockey coverage.)	Boston	1	Toronto	6
November 12, 2014	10:30 P.M.	Los Angeles	5	Anaheim	6 (SO)
November 19, 2014	8 P.M.	Philadelphia	0	N.Y. Rangers	2
December 3, 2014	8 P.M.	St. Louis	1	Chicago	4
December 10, 2014	8 P.M.	Toronto	2	Detroit	1
December 17, 2014	8 P.M.	Boston	3 (OT)	Minnesota	2
January 7, 2015	8 P.M.	Boston	3 (OT)	Pittsburgh	2
January 14, 2015	8 P.M.	Philadelphia	0	Washington	1
January 21, 2015	8 P.M.	Chicago	3	Pittsburgh	2
January 21, 2015	10:30 P.M.	Los Angeles	2	San Jose	4
January 28, 2015	8 P.M.	Pittsburgh	0	Washington	4
January 28, 2015	10:30 P.M. (Note: Blacked out in the Chicago market. Game was televised locally on Comcast Sportsnet Chicago.)	Chicago	3	Los Angeles	4
February 4, 2015	8 P.M.	Boston	2	N.Y. Rangers	3
February 11, 2015	8 P.M.	Detroit	1	Pittsburgh	4
February 18, 2015	7:30 P.M.	Detroit	3 (SO)	Chicago	2
February 18, 2015	10 P.M.	Los Angeles	4	Colorado	1
February 25, 2015	8 P.M.	Pittsburgh	4	Washington	3
March 4, 2015	8 P.M.	N.Y. Rangers	1	Detroit	2 (OT)
March 11, 2015	8 P.M.	N.Y. Rangers	3	Washington	1
March 18, 2015	8 P.M.	Chicago	1	N.Y. Rangers	0
March 18, 2015	10:30 P.M.	Los Angeles	2	Anaheim	3 (OT)
March 25, 2015	8 P.M.	Chicago	1	Philadelphia	4
April 1, 2015	8 P.M.	Philadelphia	4	Pittsburgh	1
April 8, 2015	8 P.M.	Boston	0	Washington	3

=== 2015–16 season ===
Date	Time	Away team	Score	Home team	Score
October 7, 2015	8 P.M.	NY Rangers	3	Chicago	2
October 7, 2015	10:30 P.M.	San Jose	5	Los Angeles	1
October 14, 2015	8 P.M.	Chicago	0	Philadelphia	2
October 21, 2015	8 P.M.	Philadelphia	5 (OT)	Boston	4
October 28, 2015	8 P.M.	Pittsburgh	3	Washington	1
November 4, 2015	8 P.M.	St. Louis	6 (OT)	Chicago	5
November 11, 2015	7:30 P.M.	Montreal	3	Pittsburgh	4 (SO)
November 18, 2015	8 P.M.	Washington	2 (OT)	Detroit	1
December 2, 2015	8 P.M.	N.Y. Rangers	1	N.Y. Islanders	2 (SO)
December 9, 2015	7:30 P.M.	Boston	3	Montreal	1
December 16, 2015	8 P.M.	Pittsburgh	0	Boston	3
January 6, 2016	8 P.M.	Pittsburgh	1	Chicago	3
January 13, 2016	8 P.M.	Boston	2	Philadelphia	3
January 20, 2016	8 P.M.	St. Louis	2	Detroit	1
January 27, 2016	8 P.M.	Philadelphia	4 (OT)	Washington	3
February 3, 2016	8 P.M.	Detroit	1	Tampa Bay	3
February 10, 2016	8 P.M.	N.Y. Rangers	3	Pittsburgh	0
February 17, 2016	8 P.M.	Chicago	5	N.Y. Rangers	3
February 24, 2016	7:30 P.M.	Pittsburgh	1	Boston	5
March 2, 2016	8 P.M.	Chicago	5	Detroit	2
March 9, 2016	8 P.M.	Chicago	2	St. Louis	3 (SO)
March 16, 2016	8 P.M.	Philadelphia	3	Chicago	2
March 23, 2016	8 P.M.	Boston	2	N.Y. Rangers	5
March 30, 2016	8 P.M.	Washington	1	Philadelphia	2 (SO)
April 6, 2016	8 P.M.	Philadelphia	0	Detroit	3

=== 2016–17 season ===
Date	Time	Away team	Score	Home team	Score
October 12, 2016	8 P.M.	St. Louis	5	Chicago	2
October 12, 2016	10:30 P.M.	Los Angeles	1	San Jose	2
October 19, 2016	8 P.M.	Detroit	2	N.Y. Rangers	1
October 26, 2016	8 P.M.	Boston	2	N.Y. Rangers	5
November 2, 2016	8 P.M.	Detroit	3	Philadelphia	4 (OT)
November 9, 2016	8 P.M.	Chicago	2 (OT)	St. Louis	1
November 16, 2016	7:30 P.M.	Pittsburgh	1	Washington	7
November 30, 2016	8 P.M.	Pittsburgh	3	N.Y. Islanders	5
November 30, 2016	10:30 P.M.	San Jose	4	Los Angeles	1
December 7, 2016	8 P.M.	Boston	3	Washington	4 (OT)
December 14, 2016	7:30 P.M.	Boston	3	Pittsburgh	4 (OT)
December 21, 2016	8 P.M.	Washington	2	Philadelphia	3 (SO)
January 4, 2017	8 P.M.	N.Y. Rangers	5	Philadelphia	2
January 11, 2017	8 P.M.	Pittsburgh	2	Washington	5
January 18, 2017	8 P.M.	Boston	5	Detroit	6 (SO)
January 18, 2017	10:30 P.M.	San Jose	3	Los Angeles	2
January 25, 2017	8 P.M.	Philadelphia	2	N.Y. Rangers	0
February 1, 2017	8 P.M.	Boston	3	Washington	5
February 8, 2017	8 P.M.	Chicago	4 (OT)	Minnesota	3
February 15, 2017	8 P.M.	St. Louis	2	Detroit	0
February 22, 2017	8 P.M.	Washington	4	Philadelphia	1
March 1, 2017	8 P.M.	Pittsburgh	1	Chicago	4
March 8, 2017	8 P.M.	Detroit	1	Boston	6
March 15, 2017	7:30 P.M.	Pittsburgh	0	Philadelphia	4
March 22, 2017	8 P.M.	N.Y. Islanders	3	N.Y. Rangers	2
March 29, 2017	8 P.M.	Chicago	5	Pittsburgh	1
April 5, 2017	8 P.M.	N.Y. Rangers	0	Washington	2

=== 2017–18 season ===
Date	Time	Away team	Score	Home team	Score
October 11, 2017	7:30 P.M.	Pittsburgh	3	Washington	2
October 18, 2017	8 P.M.	Chicago	2	St. Louis	5
October 25, 2017	8 P.M.	Buffalo	1	Columbus	5
November 1, 2017	8 P.M.	Philadelphia	0	Chicago	3
November 8, 2017	8 P.M.	Boston	2	N.Y. Rangers	4
November 15, 2017	8 P.M.	N.Y. Rangers	3	Chicago	6
November 29, 2017	7:30 P.M.	Tampa Bay	1	Boston	3
December 6, 2017	8 P.M.	Chicago	2	Washington	6
December 13, 2017	8 P.M.	Boston	3	Detroit	2 (OT)
December 20, 2017	8 P.M.	Detroit	3	Philadelphia	4
January 3, 2018	8 P.M.	Chicago	5	N.Y. Rangers	2
January 10, 2018	8 P.M.	Minnesota	2	Chicago	1
January 17, 2018	7:30 P.M.	Montreal	1	Boston	4
January 24, 2018	8 P.M.	Toronto	3 (OT)	Chicago	2
January 31, 2018	8 P.M.	Philadelphia	3	Washington	5
February 7, 2018	8 P.M.	Boston	6	N.Y. Rangers	1
February 28, 2018	8 P.M.	Detroit	1	St. Louis	2
March 7, 2018	8 P.M.	Pittsburgh	5	Philadelphia	2
March 14, 2018	8 P.M.	Pittsburgh	3	N.Y. Rangers	4 (OT)
March 21, 2018	8 P.M.	Boston	1	St. Louis	2 (OT)
March 28, 2018	8 P.M.	N.Y. Rangers	2	Washington	3 (OT)
April 4, 2018	8 P.M.	Chicago	4	St. Louis	3

=== Non-Wednesday Night Rivalry Telecasts ===
For select games, part of the Wednesday Night Rivalry doubleheader on NBCSN, it doesn't use the main rock theme, but instead uses the traditional NHL on NBC theme music. It also either carries the traditional feed or simulcasts another network's feed (excluding Fox Sports Regional Networks and MSG Network).

Date	Time	Away team	Score	Home team	Score
April 3, 2013	10 P.M. (Note: Blacked out in the Minnesota and San Jose markets. Game was televised locally on Fox Sports North and Comcast Sportsnet California (simulcasting the Sharks feed).)	Minnesota	2	San Jose	4
April 24, 2013	10 P.M. (Note: Blacked out in the San Jose and Phoenix markets. Game was televised locally on Comcast Sportsnet California and Fox Sports Arizona (simulcasting the Sharks feed).)	San Jose	1	Phoenix	2
January 7, 2015	10:30 P.M. (Note: Blacked out in the New York and New Jersey markets. Game was televised locally on MSG Network.)	N.Y. Rangers	4	Anaheim	1
February 11, 2015	10:30 P.M.	Washington	5 (OT)	San Jose	4
April 1, 2015	10:30 P.M.	Colorado	1	San Jose	5
April 8, 2015	10:30 P.M.	Dallas	4	Anaheim	0
October 28, 2015	10:30 P.M.	Nashville	2	San Jose	1
December 9, 2015	10 P.M.	Pittsburgh	4	Colorado	2
January 20, 2016	10:30 P.M.	Minnesota	1	Anaheim	3
January 27, 2016	10:30 P.M.	Colorado	4	Los Angeles	3
February 24, 2016	10 P.M.	San Jose	3	Colorado	4 (SO)
December 14, 2016	10 P.M.	Philadelphia	4	Colorado	3
February 1, 2017	10:30 P.M.	Colorado	0	Los Angeles	5
February 15, 2017	10:30 P.M.	Florida	6 (OT)	San Jose	5
October 4, 2017	8 P.M.	St. Louis	5	Pittsburgh	4 (OT)
October 4, 2017	10:30 P.M.	Philadelphia	5	San Jose	3
October 18, 2017	10:30 P.M.	Montreal	1	Los Angeles	5
November 1, 2017	10:30 P.M.	Nashville	1	San Jose	4
November 8, 2017	10:30 P.M.	Tampa Bay	5	San Jose	1
January 17, 2018	10 P.M.	Pittsburgh	3	Anaheim	5

=== 2018–19 season (as Wednesday Night Hockey) ===
As part of the new Wednesday Night Hockey format, "Inside the Glass" reporter Pierre McGuire is now assigned to work the late game of Wednesday Night Hockey doubleheaders while Brian Boucher takes over "Inside the Glass" reporting duties for the early game alongside Mike Emrick and Eddie Olczyk. McGuire joins the lead team of Emrick and Olczyk during single-header Wednesday Night Hockey games. In addition, Kathryn Tappen replaced Liam McHugh as the studio host for the first half of the season when the latter was promoted to work postgame coverage of Sunday Night Football. The Toronto-Winnipeg game on October 24 marked the first-ever regular-season NHL on NBC broadcast to feature only Canadian teams and an NBC-produced broadcast (as opposed to a simulcast of a Canadian network).

On February 20, Mike Tirico made his NHL announcing debut calling the Blackhawks–Red Wings game with Olczyk and Boucher.

Date	Time	Away team	Score	Home team	Score
October 3, 2018	7:30 P.M.	Boston	0	Washington	7
October 3, 2018	10:30 P.M.	Anaheim	5	San Jose	2
October 10, 2018	8 P.M.	Vegas	2	Washington	5
October 17, 2018	7 P.M.	N.Y. Rangers	3	Washington	4 (OT)
October 17, 2018	9:30 P.M.	Boston	2	Calgary	5
October 24, 2018	7 P.M.	Toronto	4	Winnipeg	2
October 24, 2018	9:30 P.M.	Tampa Bay	1	Colorado	0
November 7, 2018	7:30 P.M.	Pittsburgh	1	Washington	2
November 7, 2018	10 P.M.	Nashville	4	Colorado	1
November 14, 2018	8 P.M.	St. Louis	0	Chicago	1
November 14, 2018	10:30 P.M.	Anaheim	0	Vegas	5
November 28, 2018	7 P.M.	St. Louis	3	Detroit	4
November 28, 2018	9:30 P.M.	Pittsburgh	3	Colorado	6
December 5, 2018	8 P.M.	Edmonton	3 (SO)	St. Louis	2
December 5, 2018	10:30 P.M.	Chicago	2	Anaheim	4
December 12, 2018	8 P.M.	Pittsburgh	3	Chicago	6
December 19, 2018	8 P.M.	Pittsburgh	2	Washington	1
January 2, 2019	7 P.M.	Pittsburgh	7	N.Y. Rangers	2
January 2, 2019	9:30 P.M.	San Jose	5	Colorado	4
January 9, 2019	8 P.M.	Nashville	4 (OT)	Chicago	3
January 16, 2019	7:30 P.M.	Boston	3	Philadelphia	4
January 16, 2019	10 P.M.	San Jose	3	Arizona	6
January 23, 2019	7:30 P.M.	Washington	3	Toronto	6
January 23, 2019	10 P.M.	Nashville	2	Vegas	1
January 30, 2019	8 P.M.	Tampa Bay	2	Pittsburgh	4
February 6, 2019	8 P.M.	Boston	3	N.Y. Rangers	4(SO)
February 13, 2019	8 P.M.	Edmonton	1	Pittsburgh	3
February 20, 2019	7:30 P.M.	Chicago	5 (OT)	Detroit	4
February 20, 2019	10 P.M.	Boston	3 (SO)	Vegas	2
February 27, 2019	7:30 P.M.	Tampa Bay	4 (OT)	N.Y. Rangers	3
February 27, 2019	10 P.M.	Chicago	4	Anaheim	3
March 6, 2019	7:30 P.M.	Washington	5	Philadelphia	3
March 6, 2019	10 P.M.	St. Louis	5	Anaheim	4
March 13, 2019	7 P.M.	Chicago	5	Toronto	4
March 13, 2019	9:30 P.M.	New Jersey	6	Edmonton	3
March 20, 2019	7:30 P.M.	Tampa Bay	5 (OT)	Washington	4
March 20, 2019	10 P.M.	Winnipeg	3	Anaheim	0
March 27, 2019	7:30 P.M.	N.Y. Rangers	3	Boston	6
March 27, 2019	10 P.M.	Vegas	3	Colorado	4
April 3, 2019	8 P.M.	St. Louis	3	Chicago	4 (SO)

=== 2019–20 season (as Wednesday Night Hockey) ===
As part of the arrangement that was continued from the previous season, Brian Boucher joined Mike Emrick and Eddie Olczyk for many Wednesday Night Hockey match-ups while Pierre McGuire will appear on other broadcasts. In addition, Kathryn Tappen replaced Liam McHugh as the studio host for the first half of the season when the latter was promoted to work postgame coverage of Sunday Night Football.

Due to the coronavirus pandemic, the NHL regular season ended on March 12.

Date	Time	Away team	Score	Home team	Score
October 2, 2019	8 P.M.	Washington	3	St. Louis	2 (OT)
October 2, 2019	10:30 P.M.	San Jose	1	Vegas	4
October 9, 2019	7:30 P.M.	New Jersey	0	Philadelphia	4
October 9, 2019	10 P.M.	Los Angeles	2	Vancouver	8
October 16, 2019	7 P.M.	Colorado	2	Pittsburgh	3 (OT)
October 16, 2019	9:30 P.M.	Philadelphia	3	Edmonton	6
October 23, 2019	8 P.M.	Pittsburgh	2	Tampa Bay	3
October 30, 2019	8 P.M.	Minnesota	1	St. Louis	2
November 6, 2019	8 P.M.	Detroit	1	N.Y. Rangers	5
November 13, 2019	7:30 P.M.	Washington	2	Philadelphia	1 (SO)
November 13, 2019	10:00 P.M.	Chicago	5	Vegas	3
November 20, 2019	8 P.M.	Washington	5	N.Y. Rangers	2
December 4, 2019	8 P.M.	St. Louis	0	Pittsburgh	3
December 11, 2019	7 P.M.	Boston	2	Washington	3
December 11, 2019	9:30 P.M.	Philadelphia	1	Colorado	3
December 18, 2019	8 P.M.	Colorado	4	Chicago	1
January 8, 2020	7:30 P.M.	Washington	2	Philadelphia	3
January 8, 2020	10 P.M.	Dallas	2	Los Angeles	1
January 15, 2020	8 P.M.	Philadelphia	4	St. Louis	3 (OT)
January 22, 2020	8 P.M.	Detroit	2	Minnesota	4
January 29, 2020	7:30 P.M.	Nashville	5	Washington	4
January 29, 2020	10 P.M.	Tampa Bay	4	Los Angeles	2
February 5, 2020	8 P.M.	Boston	2	Chicago	1 (OT)
February 12, 2020	7:30 P.M.	Montreal	1	Boston	4
February 12, 2020	10 P.M.	Calgary	3	Los Angeles	5
February 19, 2020	8 P.M.	N.Y. Rangers	6	Chicago	3
February 26, 2020	8 P.M.	Buffalo	2	Colorado	3
February 26, 2020	10:30 P.M.	Pittsburgh	1	Los Angeles	2
March 4, 2020	7 P.M.	Philadelphia	5	Washington	2
March 4, 2020	9:30 P.M.	Anaheim	4	Colorado	3 (OT)
March 11, 2020 (Note: Because of the COVID-19 pandemic occurring the following day, this was the final Wednesday Night Hockey game to be called by Mike Emrick.)	8 P.M.	San Jose	2	Chicago	6

=== 2020–21 season (as Wednesday Night Hockey) ===
Due to the COVID-19 pandemic, the start of the 2020–21 NHL season has been delayed to January 13, 2021, and all teams played a 56-game division-only schedule with the NHL temporarily realigning divisions to minimize travel as much as possible, with all seven Canadian teams playing one division due to COVID-19 cross-border travel restrictions imposed by the Government of Canada.

NBCSN opened the season with a season-opening triple header on January 13, 2021 as part of Wednesday Night Hockey. 19 different teams featured in 19 Wednesday Night Hockey matchups which will include a blend of Eastern, Western, and Canadian markets. Star players such as Connor McDavid, Auston Matthews, Alexander Ovechkin, Steven Stamkos, Sidney Crosby, Patrick Kane, Carey Price, David Pastrnak, Claude Giroux, and the #1 overall pick in the 2020 NHL entry draft, Alexis Lafreniere, will be featured in Wednesday Night Hockey. 14 out of the 19 Wednesday Night Hockey matchups will feature a team that made the 2020 Stanley Cup playoffs. However, not all games will be exclusive, unlike in previous seasons.

NBC did not name a presumptive lead play-by-play voice following the retirement of Mike Emrick and chose to rotate between John Forslund and Kenny Albert. Eventually, Mike Tirico was added to the rotation starting with the Bruins-Flyers game on February 3.

This was the final season of NBC broadcasting NHL games before the league's new American national television contracts with ESPN/ABC and TNT beginning with the 2021–22 season. TNT has largely maintained Wednesday night as the primary night for its coverage. Before NBC lost NHL rights, they announced that NBCSN would be shutting down at the end of 2021 (it was first confirmed on January 22). Wednesday Night Hockey coverage was planned to be shifted to USA Network, beginning with the 2021-22 NHL season.

Date	Time	Away team	Score	Home team	Score
January 13, 2021	5:30 P.M.	Pittsburgh	3	Philadelphia	6
January 13, 2021	8 P.M.	Chicago	1	Tampa Bay	5
January 13, 2021	10:30 P.M. (Note: Originally scheduled to air exclusively on NBCSN, but was blacked out in the Denver market due to a carriage dispute with Altitude Sports and Entertainment, Dish Network and Comcast. The game was televised locally on Altitude instead.)	St. Louis	4	Colorado	1
January 20, 2021	7 P.M.	Edmonton	3	Toronto	1
January 20, 2021	9:30 P.M. (Note: Blacked out in the Los Angeles market. Game was televised locally on Fox Sports West.)	Minnesota	3	Anaheim	2
January 27, 2021	7:30 P.M.	Chicago	1	Nashville	2 (SO)
February 3, 2021	5:30 P.M. (Note: Blacked out in the Detroit and Tampa markets. Game was televised locally on Fox Sports Detroit and Fox Sports Sun. A third game between Vegas and San Jose was originally scheduled to air on NBCSN, but was postponed to February 25 due to COVID-19 protocols.)	Detroit	1	Tampa Bay	5
February 3, 2021	8 P.M. (Note: Also aired in Canada on Sportsnet.)	Boston	4	Philadelphia	3 (OT)
February 10, 2021	7 P.M.	Boston	3	N.Y. Rangers	2 (OT)
February 17, 2021	7:30 P.M.	Chicago	2	Detroit	0
February 17, 2021	10 P.M.	Winnipeg	2	Edmonton	3
February 24, 2021	7 P.M.	N.Y. Rangers	3	Philadelphia	4
February 24, 2021	9:30 P.M.	Los Angeles	2	St. Louis	1
March 3, 2021	7 P.M.	Washington	2	Boston	1 (OT)
March 3, 2021	9:30 P.M. (Note: Blacked out in the Los Angeles and Hawaii markets. Game was televised locally on Prime Ticket.)	St. Louis	3	Anaheim	2
March 10, 2021	7 P.M.	Vegas	3	Minnesota	4
March 10, 2021	9:30 P.M. (Note: Blacked out in the Los Angeles and Hawaii market. Game was televised locally on Fox Sports West (Kings feed) and Prime Ticket (Ducks feed).)	Los Angeles	5	Anaheim	1
March 17, 2021	7:30 P.M.	Philadelphia	0	N.Y. Rangers	9
March 17, 2021	10 P.M.	Edmonton	7	Calgary	3
March 24, 2021	5:30 P.M. (Note: Blacked out in the Minneapolis/St. Paul market. Game was televised locally on Fox Sports North.)	Anaheim	2	Minnesota	3
March 24, 2021	8 P.M. (Note: Also aired in Canada on Sportsnet in lieu of the postponed Edmonton Oilers–Montreal Canadiens game.)	Buffalo	2	Pittsburgh	5
March 24, 2021	10:30 P.M.	Los Angeles	2	San Jose	4
March 31, 2021	7:30 P.M. (Note: Blacked out in the Philadelphia market. Game was televised locally on NBC Sports Philadelphia. Replaced the originally scheduled game between Arizona and St. Louis, which was moved to February 8. The Philadelphia–Buffalo game was originally scheduled on March 30.)	Philadelphia	1	Buffalo	6
March 31, 2021	10 P.M.	Los Angeles	4	Vegas	2
April 7, 2021	5 P.M.	Edmonton	4	Ottawa	2
April 7, 2021	7:30 P.M.	Montreal	2	Toronto	3
April 14, 2021	7:30 P.M. (Note: Blacked out in the Denver market. Game was televised locally on Altitude Sports and Entertainment. Game was originally scheduled on February 6.)	Colorado	4	St. Louis	3
April 14, 2021	10 P.M. (Note: This game was originally scheduled to be played at 8 ET/5 PT.)	Vegas	6	Los Angeles	2
April 21, 2021	7 P.M.	Nashville	4	Chicago	5 (OT)
April 21, 2021	9:30 P.M. (Note: Blacked out in the Las Vegas market. Game was televised locally on AT&T SportsNet Rocky Mountain.)	San Jose	2	Vegas	5
April 28, 2021	7 P.M.	St. Louis	4	Minnesota	3
April 28, 2021	9:30 P.M. (Note: This was the final Wednesday Night Hockey telecast to air exclusively on NBCSN.)	Colorado	2	Vegas	5
May 5, 2021 (Note: This was the final Wednesday Night Hockey doubleheader to air on NBCSN.)	7 P.M. (Note: Blacked out in the Washington, D.C. market. Game was televised locally on NBC Sports Washington.)	Washington	4	N.Y. Rangers	2
May 5, 2021	9:30 P.M. (Note: Blacked out in the Denver market. Game was televised locally on Altitude Sports and Entertainment.)	Colorado	2	San Jose	3
May 12, 2021	9 P.M. (Note: Blacked out in the St. Louis market. Game was televised locally on Bally Sports Midwest. Game was originally scheduled on April 30. This was the final Wednesday Night Hockey regular-season game to air on NBCSN.)	Minnesota	0	St. Louis	4

=== Cancelled telecasts ===
Date	Time	Away team	Home team
April 3, 2019	10:30 P.M.	Calgary	Anaheim
March 18, 2020	7:30 P.M.	Pittsburgh	N.Y. Rangers
March 18, 2020	10 P.M.	Vegas	Arizona
March 25, 2020	8 P.M.	Pittsburgh	Chicago
March 25, 2020	10:30 P.M.	Arizona	Vegas
April 1, 2020	7:30 P.M.	Philadelphia	N.Y. Rangers
April 1, 2020	10 P.M.	Dallas	Anaheim
February 3, 2021	10:30 P.M.	Vegas	San Jose
March 31, 2021	7:30 P.M.	Arizona	St. Louis

== Ratings ==
Wednesday Night Rivalry has produced successful viewership for NBCSN.

During its inaugural season, Wednesday Night Rivalry was called "the hottest new brand in sports" by Forbes. It claimed six of the top eight most-watched NHL regular-season telecasts ever on NBC Sports Network and averaged 646,000 viewers. With the success of Wednesday Night Rivalry, the 2012–13 NHL season was the most watched NHL season on cable in 19 years.

During the 2013–14 NHL season, Wednesday Night Rivalry averaged 559,000 viewers, up 26% from its average viewership of Wednesday night games during the 2011–12 NHL season (443,000). The first two seasons of Wednesday Night Rivalry has recorded none games with more than 700,000 viewers as compared to four during the two seasons prior to the introduction of Wednesday Night Rivalry.

During the 2014–15 NHL season, NBCSN's Wednesday Night Rivalry coverage averaged 565,000 viewers. NBCSN's opening night coverage of Bruins-Flyers had an opening-night cable record 956,000 viewers. Seven of the 10 most-watched NHL games on NBCSN were Wednesday Night Rivalry games.

During the 2015–16 NHL season, Wednesday Night Rivalry averaged 608,000 viewers and produced three of the 10 most-watched NHL regular-season games on NBCSN during their time as the NHL pay television carrier. NBCSN's 10-most watched games of the 2015–16 season were either Wednesday Night Rivalry or Sunday Night Hockey games.
