= Darren Pang =

Canadian ice hockey player (born 1964)

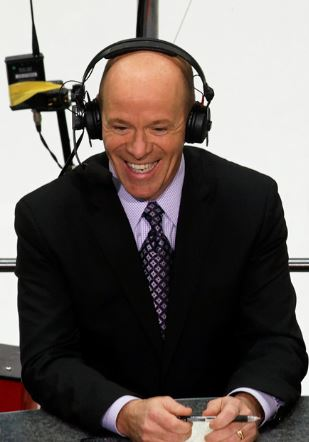
- Pang in 2010
- Born: February 17, 1964 (age 62) Meaford, Ontario, Canada
- Height: 5 ft 5 in (165 cm)
- Weight: 155 lb (70 kg; 11 st 1 lb)
- Position: Goaltender
- Caught: Left
- Played for: Chicago Blackhawks
- National team: Canada
- NHL draft: Undrafted
- Playing career: 1984–1989

Darren Robert Pang (born February 17, 1964) is a Canadian former professional ice hockey goaltender. He played his professional career with the Chicago Blackhawks of the National Hockey League (1984–85 and 1987–89).

Pang is currently the lead color commentator with the Chicago Blackhawks television broadcast and is the #2 color commentator on TNT. He also does work for NHL Network and EA Sports NHL games.

== Playing career ==
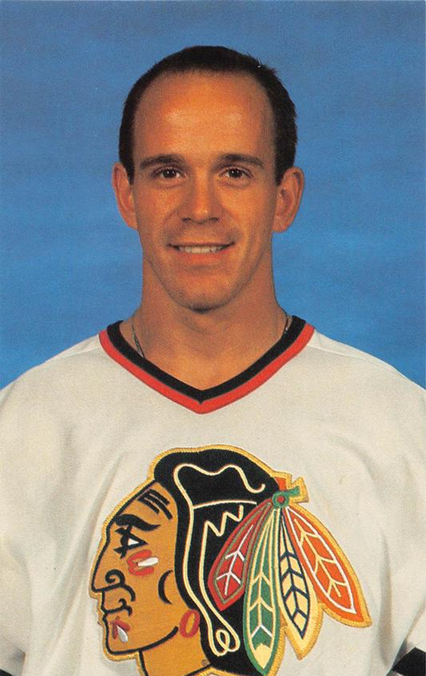
1987 photo of Pang for Chicago Blackhawks

Pang grew up playing hockey in Nepean, Ontario, for the Nepean Raiders. As a youth, he played alongside many future NHLers, including Doug Smith, Dan Quinn, and Steve Yzerman. He and teammate Dan Quinn played in the 1977 Quebec International Pee-Wee Hockey Tournament with a minor ice hockey team from West Ottawa. Pang later played for the Nepean Raiders Major Midget team that represented Ontario in the Air Canada Cup as a 15-year-old.

He was the first goalie drafted by the expansion Belleville Bulls, winning their first-ever game in the OHL. He was traded to the Ottawa 67's, where he won the Memorial Cup in 1984 while garnering the Top Goalie and All-Star team awards.

Standing 5'5", Pang was the second shortest goalie to play in the NHL, behind only Roy "Shrimp" Worters. Pang was humorously considered to have a "sixth hole" above his head. He was named to the NHL All-Rookie Team in 1988 and was a finalist for the Calder Trophy as the NHL's Rookie of the Year, won by Hall of Famer Joe Nieuwendyk. His first win was recorded on October 18, 1987, against the Winnipeg Jets.

Pang was signed as a free agent by the Chicago Blackhawks on August 15, 1984. He also set a Blackhawks goaltender's record with six assists in the 1987–1988 NHL season and had nine points in his brief NHL career. During training camp, Pang suffered a career-ending knee injury and was forced to retire on September 21, 1990.

== Broadcast career ==
Today, Pang is a lead color commentator for the Chicago Blackhawks and an ice-level analyst for national games on TNT. He also works for the NHL Network. Before TNT, he served as an ice-level analyst for NBC. Pang also contributes to Home Ice, XM Satellite Radio's all-hockey channel. Before joining the Blackhawks, he was the color commentator for the Phoenix Coyotes, St. Louis Blues, and a part-time analyst for TSN. On July 9, 2009, it was announced that he would be the color commentator for the St. Louis Blues TV broadcasts, joining John Kelly in the broadcast booth, with the former color man Bernie Federko moved to ice level. On June 8, 2023, he left the Blues to join their rival, the Blackhawks broadcasts on NBC Sports Chicago.

Previously, Pang was a top analyst for ESPN/ABC for 13 seasons and has broadcast over 95 Stanley Cup Finals games on national TV. He has worked as an analyst for three Winter Olympics. On CBS for the 1998 games in Nagano, Japan, he was the first Olympic reporter to receive full access "between the benches" with no glass separating him from the benches. He also worked as an on-ice analyst/reporter in 2002 for NBC and in 2010 he worked as a studio analyst for CTV/TSN alongside Bob McKenzie, Nick Kypreos, Daren Millard, and host James Duthie.

Starting with NHL 27, Pang is the current analyst for the EA Sports NHL video game franchise, replacing Cheryl Pounder.

== Career statistics ==
=== Regular season and playoffs ===
			Regular season									Playoffs
Season	Team	League	GP	W	L	T	MIN	GA	SO	GAA	SV%	GP	W	L	MIN	GA	SO	GAA	SV%
1980–81	Nepean Raiders	CCHL	41	—	—	—	2316	154	0	3.99	—	—	—	—	—	—	—	—	—
1981–82	Belleville Bulls	OHL	47	15	21	1	2234	173	0	4.65	—	—	—	—	—	—	—	—	—
1982–83	Belleville Bulls	OHL	12	3	8	0	570	44	0	4.63	—	—	—	—	—	—	—	—	—
1982–83	Ottawa 67's	OHL	47	28	14	3	2729	166	1	3.65	—	9	5	4	510	33	0	3.88	—
1983–84	Ottawa 67's	OHL	43	29	10	1	2318	117	2	3.03	—	13	—	—	726	41	1	3.31	—
1983–84	Ottawa 67's	M-Cup	—	—	—	—	—	—	—	—	—	5	3	1	226	13	0	3.45	—
1984–85	Chicago Black Hawks	NHL	1	0	1	0	60	4	0	4.00	.818	—	—	—	—	—	—	—	—
1984–85	Milwaukee Admirals	IHL	53	19	29	3	3129	226	0	4.33	—	—	—	—	—	—	—	—	—
1985–86	Saginaw Generals	IHL	44	21	21	0	2638	148	2	3.37	—	8	3	5	492	32	0	3.90	—
1986–87	Nova Scotia Oilers	AHL	7	4	2	0	389	21	0	3.24	.885	3	1	2	200	11	0	3.30	—
1986–87	Saginaw Generals	IHL	44	25	16	0	2500	151	0	3.62	—	—	—	—	—	—	—	—	—
1987–88	Chicago Blackhawks	NHL	45	17	23	1	2547	163	0	3.84	.891	4	1	3	239	18	0	4.52	.862
1988–89	Chicago Blackhawks	NHL	35	10	11	6	1644	120	0	4.38	.869	2	0	0	10	0	0	0.00	1.000
1988–89	Saginaw Hawks	IHL	2	1	0	0	89	6	0	4.04	—	—	—	—	—	—	—	—	—
1989–90	Indianapolis Ice	IHL	7	4	1	2	401	17	1	2.54	—	4	3	1	253	12	0	2.85	—
IHL totals			150	70	67	5	8757	548	3	3.75	—	12	6	6	745	44	0	3.54	—
NHL totals			81	27	35	7	4251	287	0	4.05	.882	6	1	3	249	18	0	4.35	.866

"Pang's stats". The Goaltender Home Page.
