= Brendan Burke (sportscaster) =

American sportscaster

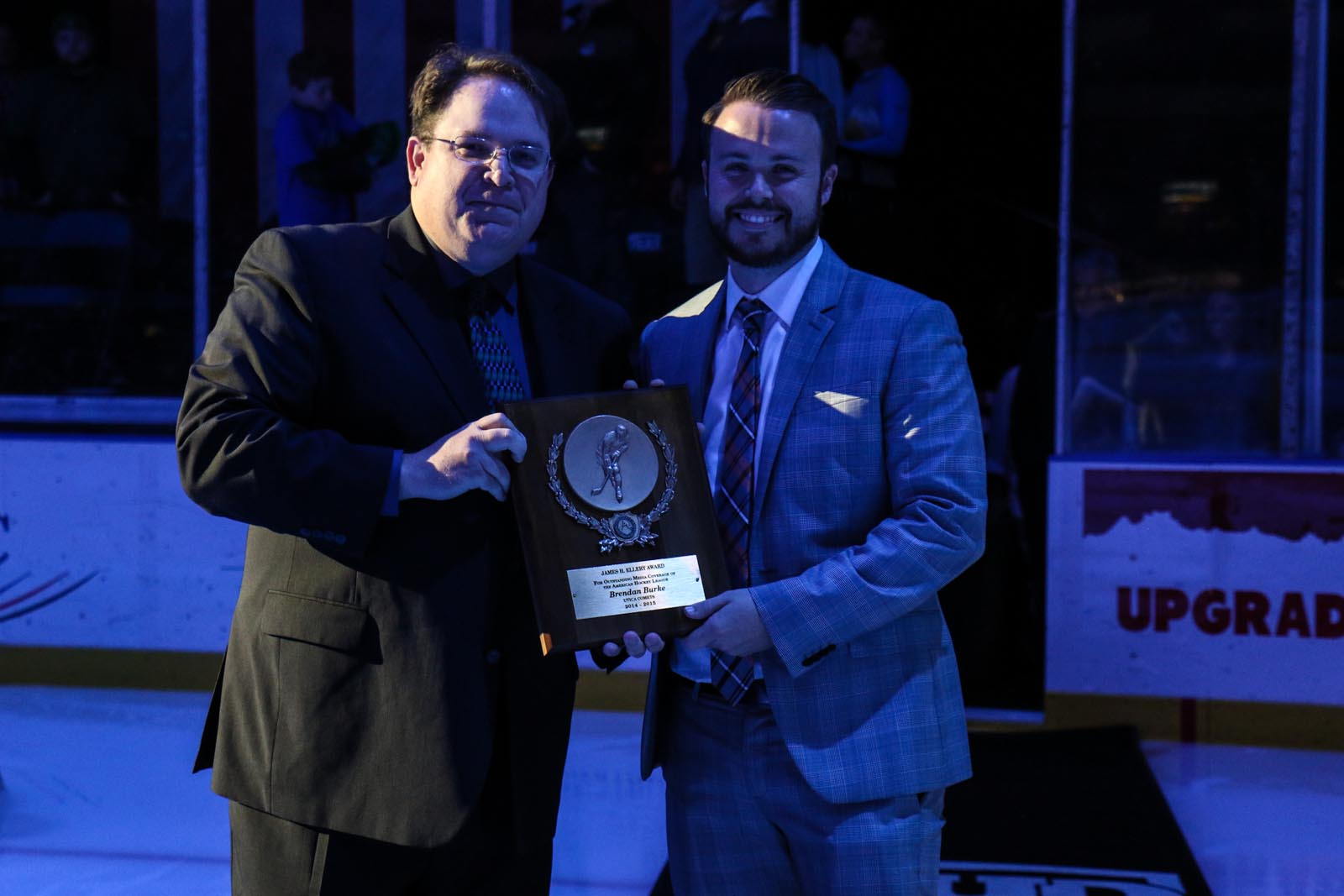
- Burke (right) in 2015
- Born: July 8, 1984 (age 42); Milwaukee, Wisconsin, U.S.
- Education: Ithaca College
- Sports commentary career
- Genre: Play-by-play
- Sports: Ice hockey, College football, College basketball, Lacrosse, Baseball

Brendan Matthew Burke (born July 8, 1984) is an American sportscaster for MSG Networks, the New York Islanders, NBC Sports and TNT Sports.

== Early life ==
Burke was born in Milwaukee, Wisconsin, while his father, Don, (sportswriter) covered the then-IHL Milwaukee Admirals, Green Bay Packers and Milwaukee Brewers. In 1990, Burke moved to Fair Lawn, New Jersey, and later attended Paramus Catholic High School.

== Broadcasting career ==
Burke's broadcasting career began during his undergraduate tenure at Ithaca College, where he served as the sports director for both of the campus radio stations. Following graduation, he broadcast minor league baseball for the Batavia Muckdogs (NYPL) and the Lakewood BlueClaws (SAL). At 22, he was hired by the Wheeling Nailers and became the youngest broadcaster in the ECHL. During his time with Nailers, he was honored as the 2008 ECHL Broadcaster of the Year, and was selected to broadcast the 2008 ECHL All-Star Game.

Burke spent five seasons as the voice of the American Hockey League's Peoria Rivermen, who were purchased by the NHL's Vancouver Canucks and moved to Utica in 2013. During the 2011-12 NHL season, he filled in for select games as the play-by-play broadcaster for the NHL's St. Louis Blues on KMOX radio. In July 2013, he was hired by the Utica Comets as the play-by-play broadcaster and head of public relations.

Since 2012, Burke has called the outdoor high school games as part of Hockey Day Minnesota for Fox Sports North. Burke handles play-by-play for college football broadcasts on Fox Sports Net along with analyst Ben Leber. He has also called college hockey for the Big Ten Network.

Burke was named to the "Top 30 Sportscasters Under 30" list released in 2014 by the Sportscasters Talent Agency of America.

On July 30, 2015, he received the James H. Ellery Memorial Award for the 2014-15 season. The award is presented annually in recognition of outstanding media coverage of the American Hockey League. He has also been part of the broadcast teams for four AHL All-Star Classics (2015, 2017, 2018, 2019).

On August 11, 2016, Brendan was named as play-by-play announcer for the New York Islanders, replacing Howie Rose, who stepped down earlier that year. Since 2017, even if the Islanders missed the playoffs, Burke was hired to broadcast the playoffs for the NHL on NBC channels.

In the summer of 2019, he was named one of the inaugural voices of the Premier Lacrosse League on NBC Sports.

Burke is the secondary full-time play-by-play announcers for the NHL on TNT, pairing with Jennifer Botterill and Darren Pang on the #2 team.

On July 2 and 3, 2022, Burke filled in for John Sterling on the New York Yankees' radio broadcasts for a series against the Cleveland Guardians. Burke also called following Yankees' series against the Pittsburgh Pirates, Oakland Athletics, and Los Angeles Angels. He also filled in on WCBS' broadcasts of New York Mets games.

In 2023, Burke returned to NBC and replaced Jason Benetti as the lead play-by-play announcer for MLB Sunday Leadoff package. Burke will also call Big Ten football games for NBC and Peacock in the fall.

On January 18, 2024, Burke filled in for Chris Vosters on NBC Sports Chicago to call the Blackhawks vs Sabres game with Darren Pang that was originally scheduled on TNT but was postponed due to weather.
