= List of Arizona Coyotes head coaches =

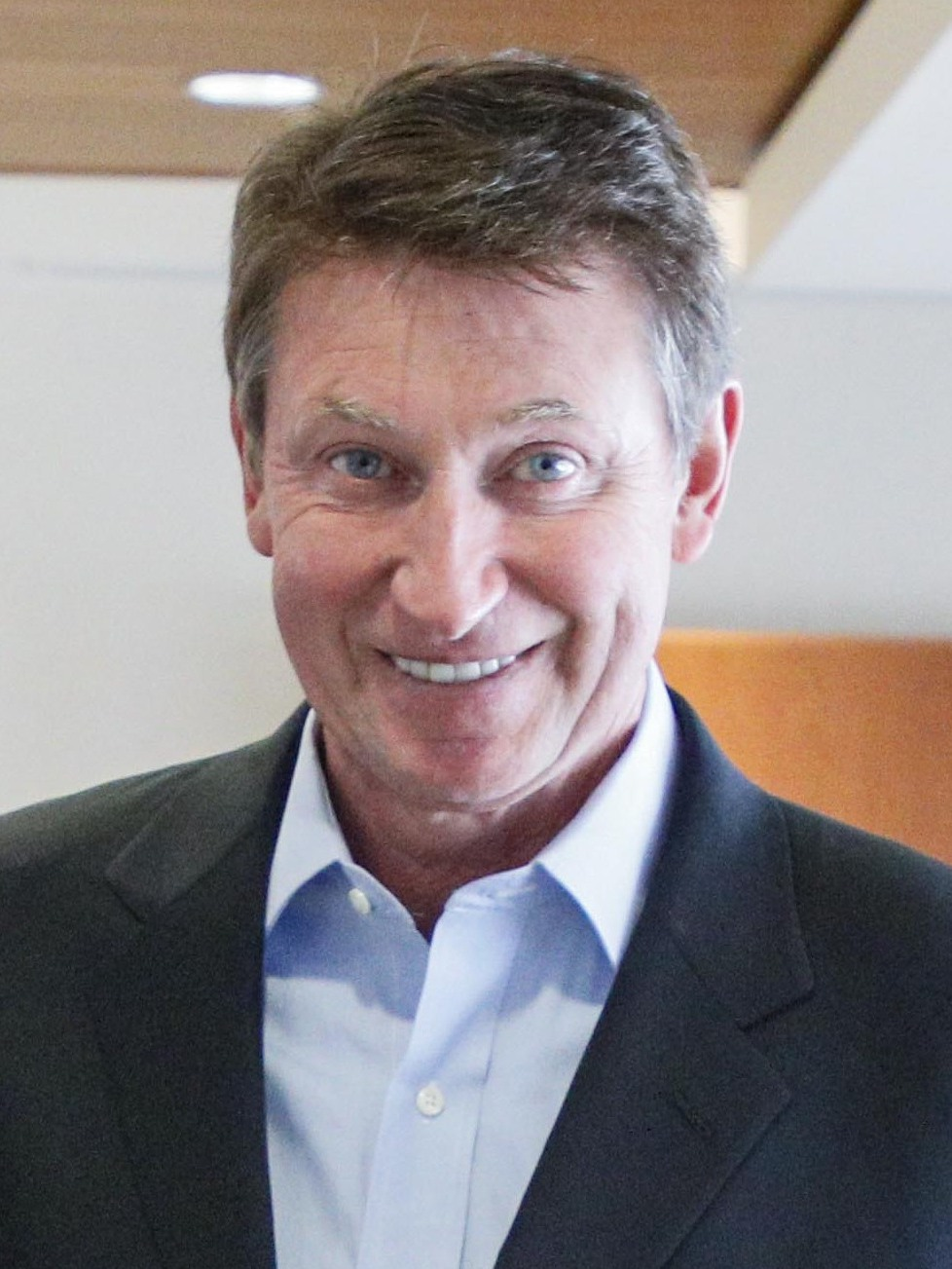
Wayne Gretzky is a former head coach of the Coyotes.

The Arizona Coyotes are an inactive professional ice hockey team based in the Phoenix metropolitan area. They competed in the National Hockey League (NHL) as a member of the Central Division (1996–1998, 2021–2024), the Pacific Division (1998–2020) in the Western Conference, and the West Division (2020–2021). The team started out as a charter member of the World Hockey Association (WHA), and were named the Winnipeg Jets. The WHA then merged with the NHL in 1979, the Jets relocated to Phoenix in 1996, and were renamed the Phoenix Coyotes. Having first played at America West Arena, the Coyotes have played their home games at the Gila River Arena, formerly named the Glendale Arena and the Jobing.com Arena, since 2003. The Coyotes are owned by IceArizona.

There have been seven head coaches for the Coyotes team. The team's first head coach was Don Hay, who coached for one season. Dave Tippett is the team's all-time leader for the most regular season games coached (622), the most regular season game wins (282), the most regular season points (647), the most playoff games coached (27), and the most playoff game wins (12). Tippett was the head coach of the Coyotes from the 2009–10 season until the end of 2016–17 season. The Jack Adams Award has been awarded twice to a Coyotes' coach; Bob Francis for the 2001–02 season and Tippett for the 2009–10 season. None of the Coyotes coaches have been elected into the Hockey Hall of Fame as a builder, though Wayne Gretzky has been elected into the Hockey Hall of Fame as a player in 1999. Francis and Gretzky have each spent their entire NHL head coaching careers with the Coyotes. Rick Tocchet served as head coach from 2017 to 2021. The team's current head coach is Andre Tourigny, who was named to the position on July 1, 2021. Tourigny coached the Coyotes until he was transferred to the Utah Mammoth, along with the rest of the Coyotes staff and players, at the end of the 2023–24 season.

== Key ==
| # | Number of coaches^{[a]} |
| GC | Games coached |
| W | Wins = 2 points |
| L | Losses = 0 points |
| T | Ties = 1 point |
| OT | Overtime/shootout losses = 1 point^{[b]} |
| PTS | Points |
| Win% | Winning percentage |
| * | Spent entire NHL head coaching career with the Coyotes |

== Coaches ==
Note: Statistics are correct through the 2023–24 season.

| # | Name | Term^{[c]} | Regular season | | | | | | Playoffs | | | | Achievements | Reference |
| # | Name | Term^{[c]} | GC | W | L | T/OT | PTS | Win% | GC | W | L | Win% | Achievements | Reference |
|---|---|---|---|---|---|---|---|---|---|---|---|---|---|---|
| 1 | Don Hay | 1996–1997 | 82 | 38 | 37 | 7 | 83 | .506 | 7 | 3 | 4 | .429 | | |
| 2 | Jim Schoenfeld | 1997–1999 | 164 | 74 | 66 | 24 | 172 | .524 | 13 | 5 | 8 | .385 | | |
| 3 | Bob Francis* | 1999–2004 | 390 | 165 | 144 | 81 | 411 | .527 | 10 | 2 | 8 | .200 | 2001–02 Jack Adams Award winner | |
| 4 | Rick Bowness | 2004 | 20 | 2 | 12 | 6 | 10 | .250 | — | — | — | — | | |
| 5 | Wayne Gretzky* | 2005–2009 | 328 | 143 | 161 | 24 | 310 | .473 | — | — | — | — | | |
| 6 | Dave Tippett | 2009–2017 | 622 | 282 | 257 | 83 | 647 | .520 | 27 | 12 | 15 | .444 | 2009–10 Jack Adams Award winner | |
| 7 | Rick Tocchet | 2017–2021 | 290 | 125 | 131 | 34 | 284 | .490 | 9 | 4 | 5 | .444 | | |
| 8 | Andre Tourigny* | 2021–2024 | 246 | 89 | 131 | 26 | 204 | .415 | — | — | — | — | | |

== Notes ==
- ^{a} A running total of the number of coaches of the Coyotes. Thus, any coach who has two or more separate terms as head coach is only counted once.
- ^{b} Before the 2005–06 season, the NHL instituted a penalty shootout for regular season games that remained tied after a five-minute overtime period, which prevented ties.
- ^{c} Each year is linked to an article about that particular NHL season.
