= Brian Boucher =

American ice hockey player (born 1977)

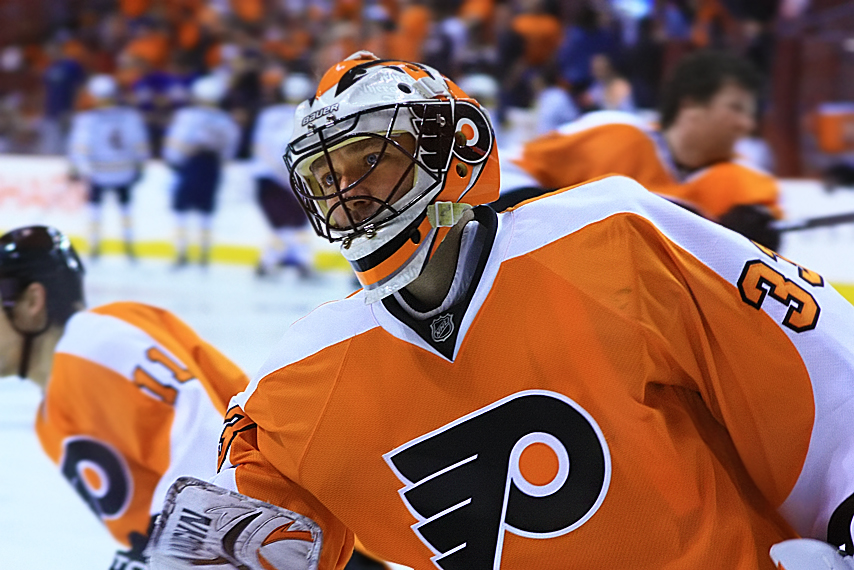
- Boucher with the Philadelphia Flyers in 2011
- Born: January 2, 1977 (age 49) Woonsocket, Rhode Island, U.S.
- Height: 6 ft 2 in (188 cm)
- Weight: 200 lb (91 kg; 14 st 4 lb)
- Position: Goaltender
- Caught: Left
- Played for: Philadelphia Flyers; Phoenix Coyotes; HV71; Calgary Flames; Chicago Blackhawks; Columbus Blue Jackets; San Jose Sharks; Carolina Hurricanes; EV Zug
- National team: United States
- NHL draft: 22nd overall, 1995; Philadelphia Flyers
- Playing career: 1997–2013

Brian Boucher (/buːˈʃeɪ/ boo-SHAY; born January 2, 1977) is an American former professional ice hockey goaltender and current game analyst, appearing on both national TNT games and also Philadelphia Flyers games on NBC Sports Philadelphia. During his 13 seasons in the National Hockey League (NHL), Boucher played for the Philadelphia Flyers, Phoenix Coyotes, Calgary Flames, Chicago Blackhawks, Columbus Blue Jackets, San Jose Sharks, and Carolina Hurricanes.

Boucher led the league in goals against average for the 1999–2000 NHL season. He currently holds the NHL's modern record for the longest shutout streak at 332:01, set while he was a member of the Phoenix Coyotes during the 2003–04 NHL season.

== Playing career ==
=== Early Philadelphia years (1999–2002) ===
Boucher was drafted by the Philadelphia Flyers in the first round of the 1995 NHL entry draft, 22nd overall. He began play with the Flyers during the 1999–2000 season, taking the starting position from veteran John Vanbiesbrouck and helping the team secure the Eastern Conference and Atlantic Division regular season titles while leading the NHL in goals against average (GAA) at 1.91. In the 2000 Stanley Cup playoffs, he backstopped his team to the Eastern Conference Finals. En route, he recorded several memorable moments, including a five-overtime victory against the Pittsburgh Penguins and a sprawling save against Patrik Eliáš of the New Jersey Devils, which thereafter became known as a "Boosh" among goaltenders. Although the Flyers were ahead three games to one in the Eastern Conference Finals against the Devils, and despite the return of the injured Eric Lindros, Boucher and the Flyers lost in seven games to the eventual Stanley Cup champion Devils. In the 2000–01 season, a weak start to the season saw him lose his starting position to Roman Čechmánek.

=== Phoenix/Shutout streak/Calgary (2002–2006) ===
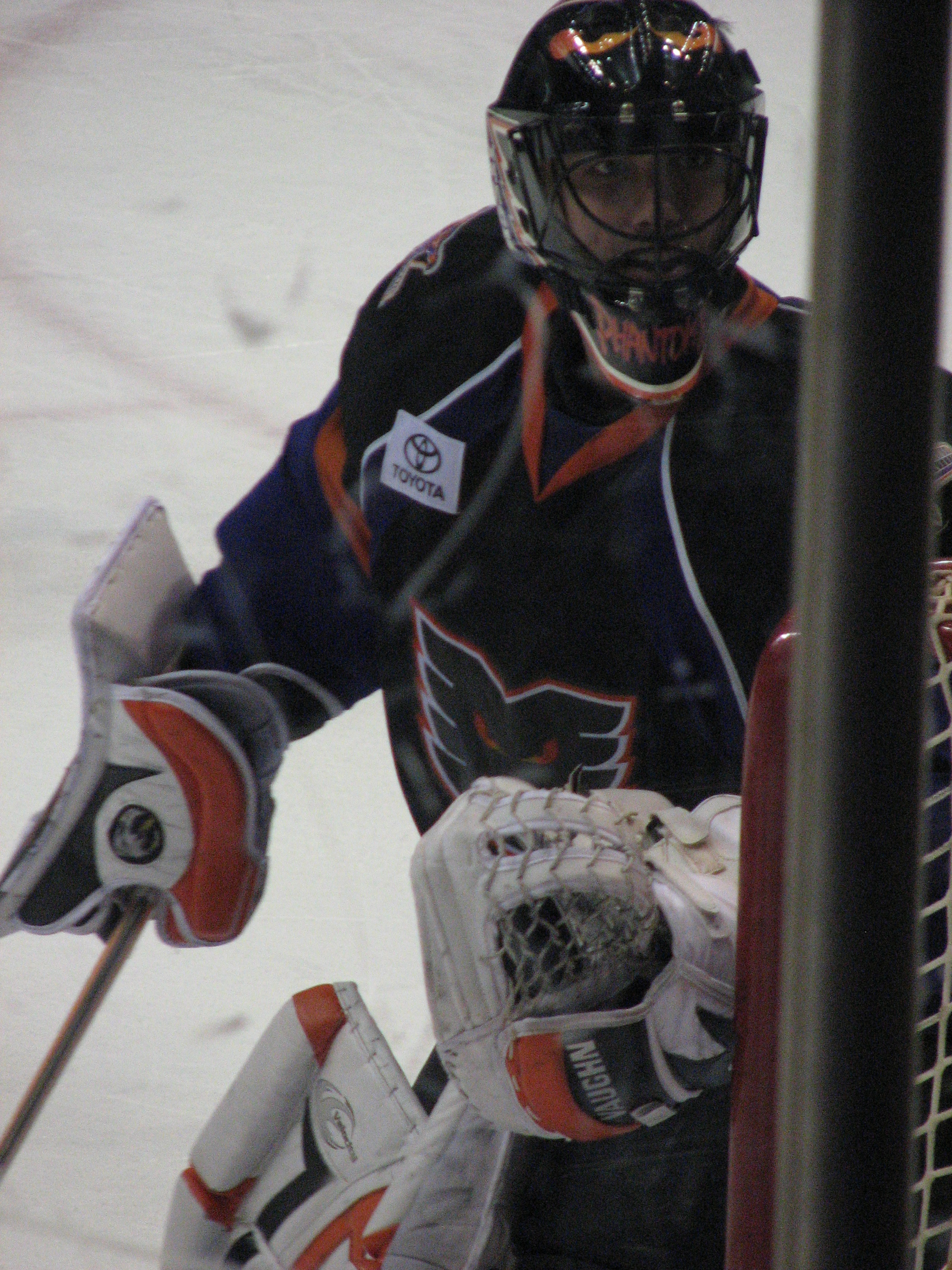
Boucher playing for the Phantoms in 2007–08.

On June 12, 2002, Boucher was traded (along with multiple draft picks) to the Phoenix Coyotes in exchange for Michal Handzuš and Robert Esche. In the 2003–04 season, Boucher broke the modern-day NHL record for the longest shutout streak by a goaltender, going unscored upon for 332 minutes, or five and a half games. On February 1, 2006, he was traded to the Calgary Flames (along with Mike Leclerc) in exchange for Steven Reinprecht and Philippe Sauvé.

=== Chicago/Columbus (2006–2007) ===
Boucher began the 2006–07 season with the Chicago Blackhawks. On February 27, 2007, he was acquired on waivers by the Columbus Blue Jackets. Boucher arrived hours prior to the Blue Jackets-Colorado Avalanche game that evening. During the game, he wore Ty Conklin's number 35 sweater. On March 3, 2007, Boucher made his Blue Jackets debut against his former team, Phoenix. His first game was a 4–3 win.

=== San Jose Sharks (2007–2009) ===
On July 23, 2007, Boucher signed an American Hockey League (AHL) contract with the Philadelphia Phantoms, the Philadelphia Flyers' AHL affiliate. He played with the Phantoms until he signed a one-year contract with the San Jose Sharks on February 26, 2008.

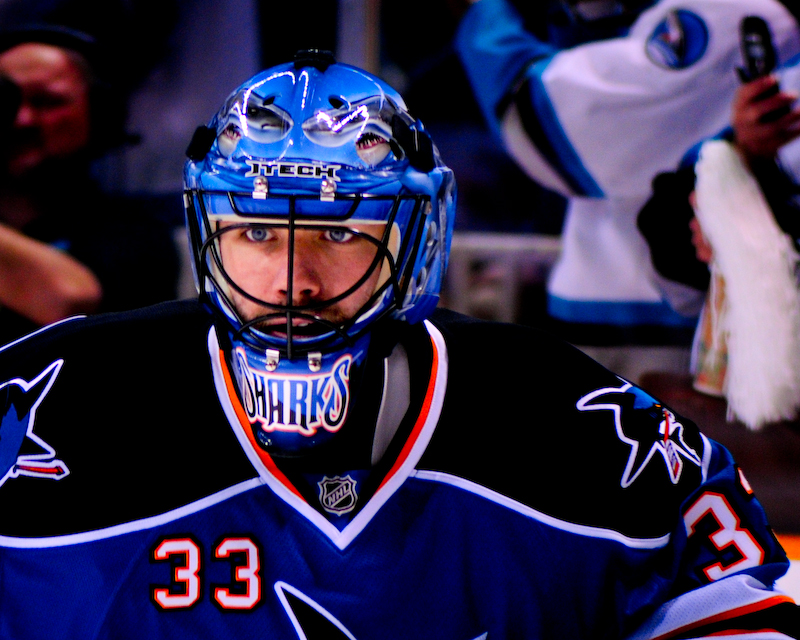
Boucher playing for San Jose in 2007–08.

On June 25, 2008, stating how much he liked the San Jose atmosphere, he signed another one-year contract with the Sharks, worth US$650,000. He recorded consecutive shutouts in each of his first two games of the 2008–09 season for the Sharks before allowing a goal in his third game.

=== Return to Philadelphia (2009–2011) ===
On July 1, 2009, Boucher agreed to a two-year contract with the Philadelphia Flyers to be the steady, veteran backup to the starting goaltender Ray Emery. However, when Emery incurred an injury midway through the season, Boucher was thrust into the spotlight with mediocre results. A hand injury soon pushed Boucher to the sideline, and he was replaced by third-string goaltender Michael Leighton. Leighton excelled in Boucher's absence, and once healthy, Boucher found himself backing up Leighton. Upon the return of Emery, Boucher was further demoted to the press box, with Leighton now the backup. Emery soon re-injured himself, giving Boucher a chance to back-up Leighton, who once again was playing well. Near the end of the season, with only 13 games left, Leighton went down with a high ankle sprain, and Boucher was back into the spotlight for the Flyers once again. After a 2–1 shootout victory in the final game of the season against the New York Rangers, Boucher and the Flyers advanced to the playoffs.

In the 2010 playoffs, Boucher defeated Martin Brodeur and the New Jersey Devils in the first round four games to one. The national media remarked he was the surprise of the playoffs after the first round with his outstanding play in net. The Flyers defeated the Boston Bruins in the second round by overcoming a three-game deficit, but Boucher was injured in game five of that series with knee injuries. Boucher returned from his injuries to serve as a backup to Leighton in game one of the Stanley Cup Final against the Chicago Blackhawks. He saw game action in game one and game five in relief of Leighton, but the Flyers lost in six games to the Blackhawks.

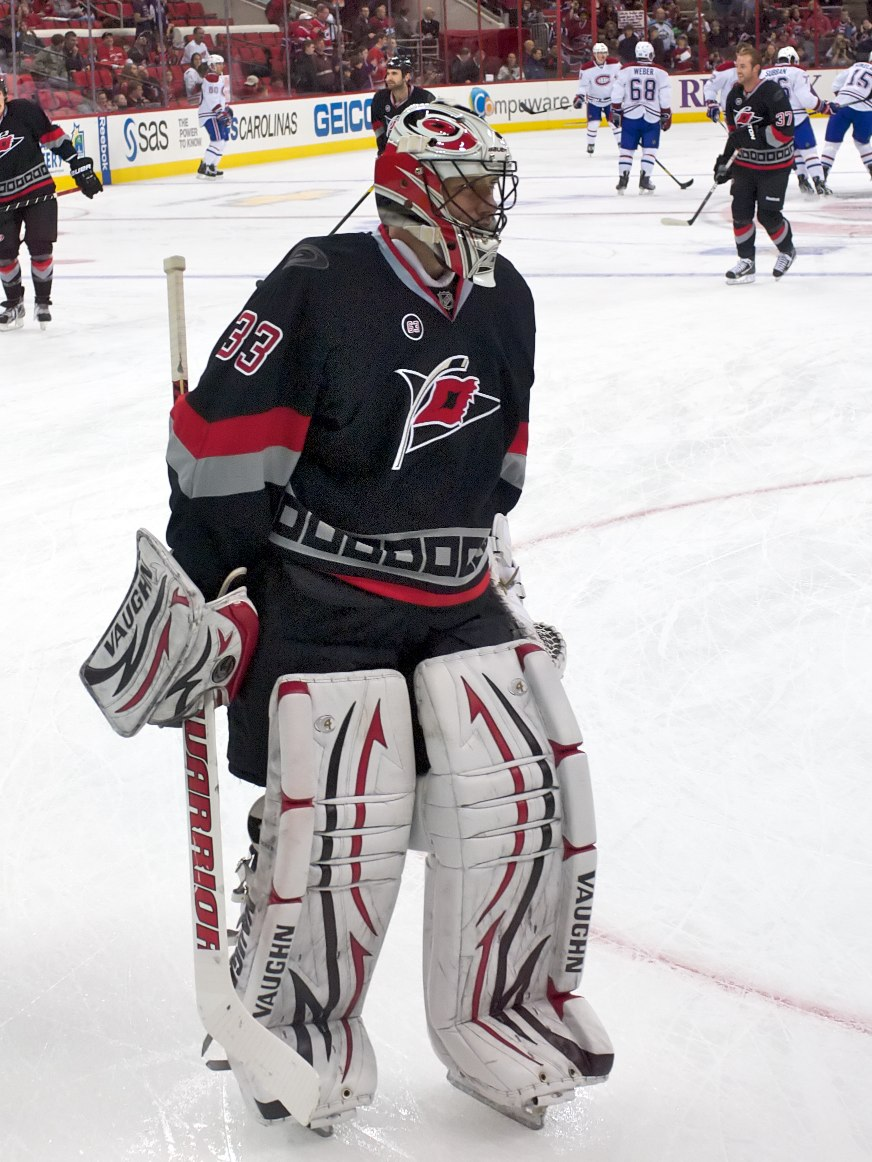
Boucher playing for the Hurricanes in 2011–12.

In the 2010–11 season, Boucher split time in goal with standout rookie Sergei Bobrovsky after Leighton was demoted to the AHL, in part for hiding an injury. Bobrovsky started most of the games, and was named the Flyers playoff starter. After game two of the conference quarterfinals against the Buffalo Sabres, in which Boucher relieved Bobrovsky and earned the win, Boucher started the next three games. However, he was pulled in game five in favour of Leighton, who was called up as a third goaltender. Leighton played well but lost game five in overtime, nonetheless earning the start for game six. However, in game six, Leighton allowed three goals in the opening period, and once again Boucher was able to earn the win in relief, making Boucher the only goaltender in NHL history to record two wins in a playoff series when coming in relief. Boucher went on to start game seven as the Flyers defeated Buffalo. Boucher started the first three games in the next round against Boston, but played poorly, allowing for deposed starter Bobrovsky to return in game four as the Flyers were ultimately swept.

=== Carolina Hurricanes and third stint with Flyers (2011–2013) ===
After the Flyers acquired goaltender Ilya Bryzgalov and decided to keep Bobrovsky as backup, Boucher was the odd man out. On July 1, 2011, Boucher was signed by the Carolina Hurricanes to a two-year contract worth $950,000 per season. He played sparingly as the backup to Cam Ward, and his season ended early due to injury.

On January 13, 2013, after the end of the 2012–13 NHL lockout, Boucher began his third stint with the Flyers, and fourth overall with the organization, when he and defenseman Mark Alt were traded to Philadelphia in exchange for Luke Pither. Three days later, Boucher was waived and sent down to Adirondack, the new home of the AHL Phantoms. Boucher was named the team's starting goaltender, relegating previous starter Scott Munroe to backup duty and sending Phantoms backup Cal Heeter to the Trenton Titans, the Flyers' ECHL affiliate. On February 10, Boucher was recalled by the Flyers after Michael Leighton suffered a lower body injury. He saw action in four games before being sent back down to Adirondack on March 9 after Leighton returned to health.

== Broadcasting career ==
After he retired from hockey in 2013, Boucher served as a studio analyst for the Philadelphia Flyers' regional telecasts on NBC Sports Philadelphia with host Al Morganti. He also worked on select regional television broadcasts on the network on a rotating basis along with Bill Clement and Scott Hartnell when lead color commentator Keith Jones was unavailable. On September 11, 2023, he was promoted as lead color commentator for the network, replacing Keith Jones.

Starting in the 2015–16, Boucher joined NBC Sports as an "Inside the Glass" reporter and studio analyst. From 2018 to 2021, Boucher worked with the lead broadcast team of Mike Emrick and Eddie Olczyk, a role he shares with Pierre McGuire.

In addition to NBCSN, Boucher was also a studio analyst for NHL Network.

After the conclusion of NBC's last Stanley Cup Final, Boucher joined ESPN/ABC for its NHL coverage, starting with the 2021–22 season, ESPN/ABC's first season under a seven-year reunion deal, which brought both networks its first set of NHL games since 2004, as their co-lead color commentator, alongside Ray Ferraro. On nights when at least two games were aired on either network, he mostly teamed up with Bob Wischusen and reporter Leah Hextall on the #2 broadcast team.

Before the 2023–24 season, Boucher left ESPN/ABC to join TNT, reuniting with former NBC Sports lead pair of Kenny Albert and Eddie Olczyk as the new lead ice-level analyst, replacing Keith Jones, who left to become the new President of Hockey Operations for the Philadelphia Flyers.

== Personal life ==
Boucher and his wife, Melissa, have a son and daughter. He had an older brother, Bruce Boucher, who died suddenly of a heart attack in 2014. His son, Tyler, is a winger for the Ottawa Senators.

== Records ==
- Modern day NHL record with five consecutive shutouts in 2003–04.

== Career statistics ==
=== Regular season and playoffs ===
			Regular season										Playoffs
Season	Team	League	GP	W	L	T	OTL	MIN	GA	SO	GAA	SV%	GP	W	L	MIN	GA	SO	GAA	SV%
1993–94	Mount Saint Charles Academy	HS-RI	15	14	0	1	—	504	8	9	0.57	—	4	4	0	180	6	1	1.20	—
1994–95	Wexford Raiders	MetJHL	8	—	—	—	—	425	23	0	3.25	—	—	—	—	—	—	—	—	—
1994–95	Tri-City Americans	WHL	35	17	11	2	—	1969	108	1	3.29	—	13	6	5	795	50	0	3.77	—
1995–96	Tri-City Americans	WHL	55	33	19	2	—	3183	181	1	3.41	.913	11	6	5	653	37	2	3.40	—
1996–97	Tri-City Americans	WHL	41	10	24	6	—	2458	149	1	3.64	.901	—	—	—	—	—	—	—	—
1997–98	Philadelphia Phantoms	AHL	34	16	12	3	—	1901	101	0	3.19	.888	2	0	0	30	1	0	1.94	.944
1998–99	Philadelphia Phantoms	AHL	36	20	8	5	—	2061	89	2	2.59	.911	16	9	7	947	45	0	2.85	.906
1999–00	Philadelphia Flyers	NHL	35	20	10	3	—	2038	65	4	1.91	.918	18	11	7	1183	40	1	2.03	.917
1999–00	Philadelphia Phantoms	AHL	1	0	0	1	—	65	3	0	2.77	.903	—	—	—	—	—	—	—	—
2000–01	Philadelphia Flyers	NHL	27	8	12	5	—	1470	80	1	3.27	.876	1	0	0	37	3	0	4.86	.824
2001–02	Philadelphia Flyers	NHL	41	18	16	4	—	2295	92	2	2.41	.905	2	0	1	88	2	0	1.37	.939
2002–03	Phoenix Coyotes	NHL	45	15	20	8	—	2544	128	0	3.02	.894	—	—	—	—	—	—	—	—
2003–04	Phoenix Coyotes	NHL	40	10	19	10	—	2364	108	5	2.74	.906	—	—	—	—	—	—	—	—
2004–05	HV71	SEL	4	0	4	0	—	235	13	0	3.32	.884	—	—	—	—	—	—	—	—
2005–06	Phoenix Coyotes	NHL	11	3	6	—	0	512	33	0	3.87	.877	—	—	—	—	—	—	—	—
2005–06	San Antonio Rampage	AHL	6	2	3	—	0	345	8	0	1.39	.950	—	—	—	—	—	—	—	—
2005–06	Calgary Flames	NHL	3	1	2	—	0	182	15	0	4.95	.854	—	—	—	—	—	—	—	—
2006–07	Chicago Blackhawks	NHL	15	1	10	—	3	827	45	1	3.26	.884	—	—	—	—	—	—	—	—
2006–07	Columbus Blue Jackets	NHL	3	1	1	—	0	142	9	0	3.80	.866	—	—	—	—	—	—	—	—
2007–08	Philadelphia Phantoms	AHL	42	23	16	—	1	2288	94	4	2.47	.917	—	—	—	—	—	—	—	—
2007–08	San Jose Sharks	NHL	5	3	1	—	1	238	7	1	1.76	.932	1	0	0	2	0	0	0.00	—
2008–09	San Jose Sharks	NHL	22	12	6	—	3	1291	47	2	2.18	.917	—	—	—	—	—	—	—	—
2009–10	Philadelphia Flyers	NHL	33	9	18	—	3	1742	80	1	2.76	.899	12	6	6	656	27	1	2.47	.909
2009–10	Adirondack Phantoms	AHL	1	1	0	—	0	60	2	0	2.00	.935	—	—	—	—	—	—	—	—
2010–11	Philadelphia Flyers	NHL	34	18	10	—	4	1885	76	0	2.42	.916	9	4	4	422	22	0	3.13	.904
2011–12	Carolina Hurricanes	NHL	10	1	6	—	1	546	31	0	3.41	.881	—	—	—	—	—	—	—	—
2012–13	Adirondack Phantoms	AHL	16	6	8	—	1	910	39	0	2.57	.905	—	—	—	—	—	—	—	—
2012–13	Philadelphia Flyers	NHL	4	0	2	—	0	144	6	0	2.50	.891	—	—	—	—	—	—	—	—
2013–14	EV Zug	NLA	5	—	—	—	—	309	14	0	2.72	.925	—	—	—	—	—	—	—	—
NHL totals			328	120	139	30	15	18,219	822	17	2.71	.901	43	21	18	2388	94	2	2.36	.911

=== International ===
Year	Team	Event	GP	W	L	T	MIN	GA	SO	GAA	SV%
1996	United States	WJC	4	3	1	0	220	13	0	3.55	.889
1997	United States	WJC	6	4	1	1	357	9	2	1.51	.942
Junior totals			10	7	2	1	577	22	2	2.29	—

== Awards and achievements ==
=== WHL ===
- 1995–96 – (West) second All-Star team
- 1996–97 – (West) first All-Star team
- 1996–97 – Del Wilson Trophy (WHL Goaltender of the Year)

=== International ===
- 1997 – All-Star Selection, IIHF World Junior Hockey Championships

=== AHL ===
- 1998 – Calder Cup champion with Philadelphia Phantoms

=== NHL ===
- 1999–2000 – NHL All-Rookie Team
- 1999–2000 – GAA leader (1.91)
- Player of the Week (October 29, 2001 – November 4, 2001)

Awards and achievements
Preceded by Jason Bowen	Philadelphia Flyers first-round draft pick 1995	Succeeded by Dainius Zubrus
