= Stéphane Auger =

Canadian ice hockey official

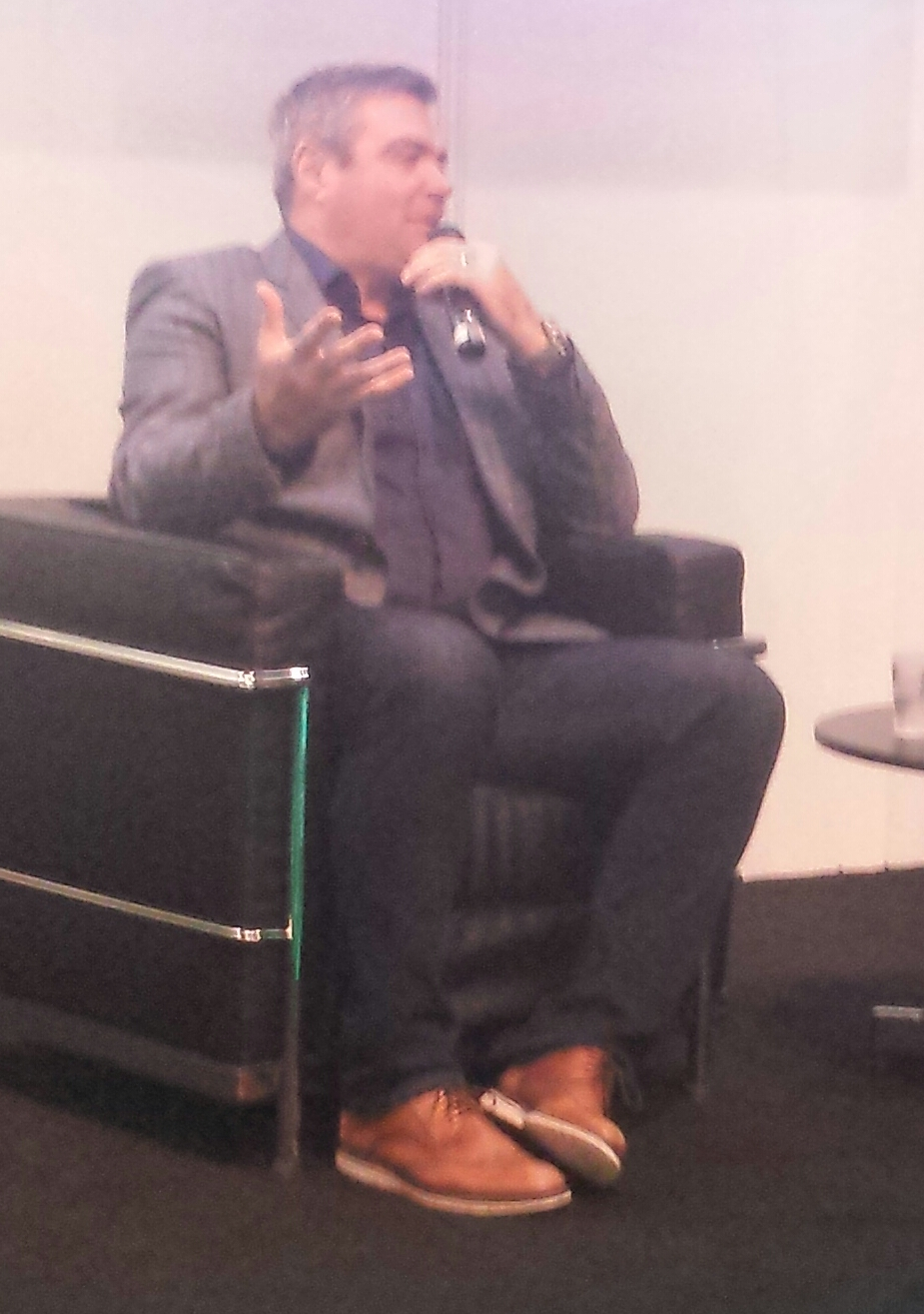
- Born: Stéphane Auger; December 9, 1970 (age 55); Montreal, Quebec
- Occupation: Former NHL referee

Stéphane Auger (born December 9, 1970, in Montreal, Quebec) is a former National Hockey League (NHL) referee who wore uniform number 15. Auger began his career as an official at the age of 16 as a part-time job in the winter. He began officiating provincial midget hockey and moved up to the Quebec Major Junior Hockey League before turning to the professional ranks. He joined the National Hockey League Officials Association in 1994 and officiated his first NHL game on April 1, 2000, a game between the Chicago Blackhawks and host New York Islanders. He officiated over 500 NHL games in his career, including 10 playoff games. The NHL announced Auger's retirement on June 15, 2012, amid speculation that he had been pushed out by the league.

== Controversy ==
Auger has been caught up numerous times in on-ice controversy. In an NHL game on December 13, 2005, in Montreal, he assessed Phoenix Coyotes captain Shane Doan a misconduct penalty after concluding he verbally abused an official and made culturally insensitive comments against the referees, who were French-Canadian. The NHL reviewed the allegations against Doan and concluded that they were baseless.

After a game on January 11, 2010, Vancouver Canucks forward Alexandre Burrows accused Auger of having a personal vendetta resulting from an incident in a previous game. Burrows stated that Auger told him before the game that he was going to "get him back" for making the official look bad previously. Burrows received four penalties in the third period of the game, a Vancouver loss against the Nashville Predators. The league investigated Burrows' claims and concluded that they could not be substantiated, while stating that "Referee Auger’s intentions were beyond reproach."

On March 12, 2011, numerous Islanders players accused Auger of conspiracy, saying they felt the officials saw the Devils' playoff run as more important than their own playoff push. There was a large discrepancy regarding power-play time. A New Jersey Devils player was insulting the Islanders coach and his assistants during the game and the player was not punished for his actions. Additionally, when Alternate Captain Frans Nielsen spoke to Auger about what was going on, he was given what was the first game misconduct penalty of his career. Islanders interim coach Jack Capuano stated that he requested but received no explanation from Auger on the Nielsen penalty, citing difficulty engaging the officiating crew throughout the entire game. On March 13, 2011, the NHL Senior Vice President and Director of Officiating Terry Gregson confirmed to Newsday that the NHL was indeed looking into this matter.
