= Jim Jackson (sportscaster) =

American professional sportscaster (born 1963)

- Born: March 23, 1963 (age 63); Utica, New York
- Sports commentary career
- Teams: Philadelphia Flyers; Philadelphia Phillies
- Genres: Flyers TV play-by-play; Phillies radio pre-game host Phillies radio post-game host; Phillies radio play-by-play
- Sports: Ice hockey; Baseball

Jim Jackson (born March 23, 1963) is an American professional sportscaster. He is the TV play-by-play announcer for the Philadelphia Flyers. Jackson formerly did radio play-by-play broadcasting duties for the 4th and 5th innings of Phillies home games.

== Philadelphia Flyers ==
Jackson, an Upstate New York native, started his professional career broadcasting for the Utica Devils after graduating from Syracuse University. In 1993, he became the radio play-by-play broadcaster for the Philadelphia Flyers, replacing Gene Hart, who had gone back onto television. Two seasons later, Jackson was promoted to the television side where he remains to this day. He has been the play-by-play voice of the Flyers on television for 32 seasons, now covering the games on NBC Sports Philadelphia.

== Philadelphia Phillies and other experience ==
Beginning in 2007, Jackson took on pre-game and post-game host duties for Philadelphia Phillies radio broadcasts, occasionally providing play-by-play if another member of the broadcast crew was absent. In 2010, his role was expanded to include play-by-play during the fourth and fifth innings of all regular season home games that did not conflict with his Flyers schedule. Jackson’s tenure with the Phillies lasted until he was laid off following the 2020 season. He has previous baseball experience as radio play-by-play voice of the Utica Blue Sox of the New York–Penn League from 1986 to 1993 and of the Eastern League's Trenton Thunder in 2005. He has also called college football, basketball, and lacrosse during his broadcasting tenure. Jackson has worked the Stanley Cup Playoffs for TNT since 2022.

== Personal life ==
Jackson has two children, Deanna, born 1997, and Johnny, born 2000. He lives in Gloucester Township, New Jersey.
