= Blackhawks–Blues rivalry =

National Hockey League rivalry

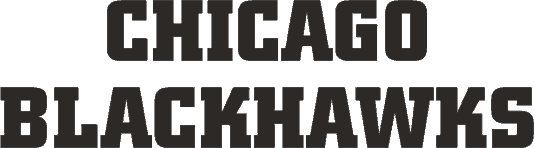
- Chicago Blackhawks St. Louis Blues
- First meeting: November 12, 1967
- Latest meeting: October 6, 2026
- Next meeting: December 4, 2026

Statistics
- Total meetings: 402
- All-time series: 193–162–35–12 (CHI)
- Regular season series: 158–134–35–12 (CHI)
- Postseason results: 35–28 (CHI)
- Largest victory: CHI 10–3 STL; October 27, 1974
- Longest win streak: CHI W7
- Current win streak: CHI W1

Postseason history
- 1973 quarterfinals: Blackhawks won, 4–1; 1980 preliminary round: Blackhawks won, 3–0; 1982 division finals: Blackhawks won, 4–2; 1983 division semifinals: Blackhawks won, 3–1; 1988 division semifinals: Blues won, 4–1; 1989 division finals: Blackhawks won, 4–1; 1990 division finals: Blackhawks won, 4–3; 1992 division semifinals: Blackhawks won, 4–2; 1993 division semifinals: Blues won, 4–0; 2002 conference quarterfinals: Blues won, 4–1; 2014 first round: Blackhawks won, 4–2; 2016 first round: Blues won, 4–3

The Blackhawks–Blues rivalry is a National Hockey League (NHL) rivalry between the Chicago Blackhawks and the St. Louis Blues. Since the 1970–71 season (excluding the 2020–21 season), the two teams have been in the same division. It is the most intense rivalry in terms of penalty minutes and fighting, and at the height of the rivalry during the Norris Division days, it was common to go to a Chicago versus St. Louis game and see a brawl break out.

Since the move of the Detroit Red Wings to the Eastern Conference, this rivalry is considered the top divisional rivalry for both teams.

== Background ==
During the early part of the Original Six era, the Blackhawks considered St. Louis a secondary market and occasionally played regular season games at St. Louis Arena, but by the time the NHL began to seriously consider expansion the Blackhawks owners insisted that St. Louis be awarded a franchise. They wanted to unload the St. Louis Arena, which they still owned but had not been well-maintained, and no longer needed St. Louis as a secondary market. So intense was their influence that the NHL formally awarded St. Louis a franchise without even receiving a formal bid from any prospective ownership group. The Blues were admitted to the NHL via the 1967 NHL expansion.

The long-standing bitter rivalry between sports fans from Chicago and St. Louis, which are separated by 300 miles, as seen in the Cardinals–Cubs rivalry in Major League Baseball (MLB), has led to the Blackhawks and Blues to have an intense hatred for each other. Other than the 2020–21 season in which St. Louis played in the temporarily realigned West Division, the two teams have been in the same division since 1970 (West in 1970–1974, Smythe in 1974–1981, Norris in 1981–1993, and Central since 1993). They also qualified for the playoffs together every season from 1980 to 1997. Every Norris Division final from 1982 to 1993 involved either the Blackhawks or Blues, or both teams, except for 1987, when the Detroit Red Wings faced the Toronto Maple Leafs.

The rivalry caught fire in the late 1980s and early 1990s, when both teams had well-known stars such as Jeremy Roenick, Chris Chelios, and Ed Belfour for the Hawks and Brett Hull, Adam Oates, and Vincent Riendeau for the Blues; additionally, both played in old arenas (St. Louis Arena and Chicago Stadium) that were regarded as two of the loudest in the league. By coincidence, both were built in 1929 and both closed in 1994 to make way for new buildings. The Blackhawks moved across the street to the United Center, while the Blues moved into the Kiel Center.

All six Sutter brothers would either play for the Blackhawks or Blues. In fact, left wingers Darryl and Brian spent their entire careers with Chicago and St. Louis respectively. They also became head coaches for the teams that they played. Brian also coached the Blackhawks for a short time. He won the Jack Adams Award with the Blues in 1991 and was the runner-up in 2002 with the Blackhawks. Duane and Brent would also play and end their careers with the Blackhawks although they never played together with Chicago. Twins Ron and Rich would play together at one point with the Blues when Ron got traded in 1992. Also, Rich is the only Sutter brother to play for the Blackhawks and Blues. This often created a brother versus brother match-up not only in the playoffs, but as well in the season division battles that both teams got involved in.

== Notable moments ==
One notable moment in the rivalry was the 1990–91 season. Both teams not only battled for the Norris Division, but the top seed in the Campbell Conference, and Presidents' Trophy. It came down to the wire on the last day of the season when the Blackhawks took all three crowns by a point with a win against Detroit Red Wings, even though the Blues won their last game against Minnesota North Stars. St. Louis finished second overall in the entire NHL with 105 points, while Chicago finished first overall with 106 points. Both teams were expected to meet in the Norris Division final, but the Minnesota North Stars upset Chicago in the Norris Division semifinal and St. Louis in the Norris Division final, both in six games enroute to the Stanley Cup Final where they lost in six games to the Pittsburgh Penguins, making it the second and third largest upsets respectively in NHL history by points.

Perhaps the defining moment in that 1990–91 season came in a brawl during the Blackhawks' 6–4 win over the Blues on March 17, 1991. The game became known as the "St. Patrick's Day Massacre" for the massive amount of fighting and penalties handed out to both teams. In the game, the two teams got into a brawl after Glen Featherstone shoved Jeremy Roenick after his hard hit on Harold Snepsts. Keith Brown shoved Featherstone, beginning a brawl. Twelve players, six on each team, were ejected, while there was a total of 278 penalty minutes. After reviewing the tapes, the NHL suspended Blues defenseman Scott Stevens for two games, and Hawks Mike Peluso and Blues Kelly Chase each for ten games and fined both teams $10,000 each.

The following year in the Norris Division semifinal – the Sutter brothers squared off in this playoff series. Twins Ron and Rich were on the Blues as players, while Brian was the head coach. While the Blackhawks had Brent as the player, Darryl was the assistant coach of the team, and Duane was a scout. Although the Blues took the first two out of the three games, the Blackhawks won the rest of the series, which began a playoff streak of 11 straight games and their run to the 1992 Stanley Cup Final, where they were swept by the Penguins.

In the 1993 Norris Division semifinal, Chicago, despite having won the division handily, were swept by the Blues, who won the series on an overtime goal by Craig Janney. Belfour, who said he had been interfered with on the goal, caused thousands of dollars' worth of damage to the visitors' dressing room at the Arena, breaking a coffeemaker, hot tub, and television among other objects. Belfour and Hull would later become teammates on the Dallas Stars team that won the 1999 Stanley Cup.

== Recent developments ==
The rivalry cooled down during the 2000s as both teams went in different directions, both teams met in the playoffs just once during the decade (with the Blues winning 4–1 in 2002). With the rise of the Blackhawks and Blues back into prominence in the early 2010s, the rivalry heated up once again. The Hawks beat the Blues in the opening round of the 2014 Stanley Cup playoffs 4–2 after trailing 2–0. They played each other again in the first round of the 2016 playoffs. The Blues jumped out to a 3–1 series lead, but the Blackhawks won games five and six to force a game seven. The Blues won the game 3–2 on a goal by former Blackhawk Troy Brouwer with 11:29 left in the third period.

Due to the NHL's realignment and adoption of division-only play due to the COVID-19 pandemic, the Blues and Blackhawks did not play against each other during the 2020–21 regular season. The Blues were in the Western Division with the Colorado Avalanche and Minnesota Wild of the Central and the five United States–based teams in the Pacific (Anaheim, Arizona, Los Angeles, San Jose and Vegas), while the Blackhawks, Dallas Stars and Nashville Predators remained in the Central, with five Eastern Conference teams (Carolina and Columbus from the Metropolitan; Detroit, Florida and Tampa Bay from the Atlantic).

== See also ==
- List of NHL rivalries
- Cardinals–Cubs rivalry
