= NHL Game of the Week =

- Genre: NHL game telecasts
- Presented by: Sean McDonough; Ray Ferraro; Emily Kaplan; Bob Wischusen; Ryan Callahan; Leah Hextall; Mike Monaco; A. J. Mleczko; Blake Bolden; Dave Jackson; Steve Levy; Mark Messier; P. K. Subban; John Buccigross; Kevin Weekes; Arda Ocal
- Country of origin: United States
- Original language: English
- No. of seasons: 15

Production
- Camera setup: Multi-camera
- Running time: 180 minutes or until game ends
- Production companies: NBC Sports (2006–2021); ESPN (2021–present)

Original release
- Network: NBC; NHL Center Ice (2006-07)
- Release: January 14, 2006 – May 8, 2021
- Network: ABC; ESPN; ESPN+; Disney+
- Release: November 26, 2021 – present

Related
- NHL on NBC; NHL on ABC

The National Hockey League Game of the Week is a branding used for regular season National Hockey League weekend games that are typically televised on a national broadcast network in the U.S.

The branding was previously used by NBC on Sunday afternoons, beginning at the weekend of the NFL Conference Championship games when it held NHL broadcast rights between the 2005–06 and 2020–21 seasons. During the 2016–17, NBC began to promote the Star Sunday brand on both the Game of the Week and its Sunday Night Hockey broadcasts on sister cable network NBCSN, focusing primarily on the NHL's star players. Star Sunday featured extensive pre-game, in-game and post-game coverage of each featured player. The first game under the new package featured the New York Rangers and the Detroit Red Wings on January 22, 2017, with Ryan McDonagh and Dylan Larkin the featured players of their respective teams.

Beginning with the 2021–22 season, ABC replaced NBC as the league's network broadcast partner. Since then, ABC has typically aired one game per weekend, usually on Saturday afternoons, beginning in February. Due to the current arrangement of ABC's sports programming being produced and co-branded by ESPN, the broadcasts carry the NHL on ESPN production and branding.

== History ==
Historically, there was game of the week broadcasts in the past but until NBC Sports took over broadcasting rights to the National Hockey League from ESPN and ABC they were never consistent.

=== NHL on NBC era ===
Starting in 2007–08, the most important games on primarily Sundays or Thursdays would be titled NHL on NBC Game of the Week which eventually got moved to only Sundays later that season.

Then as a part of the deal made between NBC and the NHL in 2011–12, the game of the week package would add the NHL Thanksgiving Showdown to its schedule and this would continue until the 2020-21 season.

=== ESPN/ABC takes over ===
In March 2021, after nearly 20 years away, ESPN announced it had reacquired broadcasting rights to the NHL and as a part of that deal ABC would take over rights to air the game of the week package.

ABC Hockey Saturday as is would be called would debut on November 26, 2021 with the Thanksgiving Showdown between the New York Rangers and the Boston Bruins. The Thanksgiving Showdown, however, only aired on ABC in its first year of the 7-year deal; the network traded it to TNT Sports in favor of airing Stadium Series games either on ABC or ESPN, starting in its second year.

ABC’s game of the week coverage consists of mostly of either doubleheaders or tripleheaders from Saturday afternoon to night which usually begins at the last weeks of the season which starts with a 30-minute pregame show.

== Schedules ==
=== 2000s ===
==== 2005–06 season ====
Date	Time	Away team	Score	Home team	Score
January 14, 2006	2 P.M.	NY Rangers	3	Detroit	4
January 14, 2006	2 P.M.	Colorado	4 (OT)	Philadelphia	3
January 14, 2006	2 P.M.	Dallas	2 (SO)	Boston	1
January 21, 2006	2 P.M. ET	Philadelphia	2	Pittsburgh	1
January 21, 2006	2 P.M. ET	Detroit	4	Colorado	3
January 21, 2006	3 P.M. PT	San Jose	4	Los Angeles	3
January 28, 2006	2 P.M.	NY Rangers	7	Pittsburgh	1
January 28, 2006	2 P.M.	Tampa Bay	6	Philadelphia	0
January 28, 2006	2 P.M.	Detroit	1 (SO)	Dallas	2
February 4, 2006	2 P.M.	Detroit	3	Colorado	0
February 4, 2006	2 P.M.	N.Y. Islanders	5 (SO)	Pittsburgh	4
February 4, 2006	2 P.M.	Dallas	3	St. Louis	4 (OT)
April 8, 2006	2 P.M. ET	NY Rangers	4 (OT)	Boston	3
April 8, 2006	2 P.M. ET	St. Louis	2	Colorado	4
April 8, 2006	3 P.M. PT	Anaheim	4	Los Angeles	2
April 15, 2006	2 P.M.	NY Rangers	1	Philadelphia	4
April 15, 2006	2 P.M.	Boston	3	Atlanta	4
April 15, 2006	2 P.M.	Dallas	4 (OT)	Minnesota	3

==== 2006–07 season ====
Date	Time	Away team	Score	Home team	Score
January 13, 2007	2 P.M.	Pittsburgh	5	Philadelphia	3
January 13, 2007	2 P.M.	Boston	1	NY Rangers	3
January 13, 2007	2 P.M.	Los Angeles	5	St. Louis	6
January 28, 2007	3:30 P.M.	Colorado	1	Detroit	3
January 28, 2007	3:30 P.M.	Dallas	1	Anaheim	4
January 28, 2007	3:30 P.M.	Philadelphia	2	Atlanta	1
February 11, 2007	3:30 P.M.	Colorado	5	Dallas	7
February 11, 2007	3:30 P.M.	Tampa Bay	4	New Jersey	1
February 11, 2007	3:30 P.M.	Chicago	5	Columbus	4
February 18, 2007	3:30 P.M.	Washington	2	Pittsburgh	3
February 18, 2007	3:30 P.M.	Chicago	1	NY Rangers	2
February 18, 2007	3:30 P.M.	San Jose	2	Dallas	5
March 4, 2007	12:30 P.M.	Colorado	4 (OT)	Detroit	3
March 4, 2007	12:30 P.M.	Philadelphia	3	Pittsburgh	4 (SO)
March 11, 2007	12:30 P.M.	Boston	6	Detroit	3
March 11, 2007	12:30 P.M.	Carolina	1	NY Rangers	2 (SO)
March 25, 2007	12:30 P.M.	Boston	1	Pittsburgh	5
March 25, 2007	12:30 P.M.	NY Rangers	2 (SO)	NY Islanders	1
April 1, 2007	12:30 P.M. ET	Detroit	4	Columbus	1
April 1, 2007	3 P.M. PT	Los Angeles	2	San Jose	6
April 8, 2007	1 P.M.	Buffalo	3	Philadelphia	4
April 8, 2007	1 P.M.	Chicago	2	Dallas	3

==== 2007–08 season ====
Starting this season, NBC aired these Game of the Week games on a national basis, in addition to carrying the national broadcasts of the Winter Classic on New Year's Day and the Stanley Cup Playoffs during the Spring.

Date	Time	Away team	Score	Home team	Score
January 20, 2008	12:30 P.M.	Boston	3	NY Rangers	1
February 3, 2008	2 P.M.	NY Rangers	5	Montreal	3
February 10, 2008	3:30 P.M.	Anaheim	3	Detroit	2
February 17, 2008	3:30 P.M.	Detroit	0	Dallas	1
March 2, 2008	12:30 P.M.	Philadelphia	4	NY Rangers	5 (SO)
March 9, 2008	12:30 P.M.	Pittsburgh	4	Washington	2
March 16, 2008	12 P.M.	Philadelphia	1	Pittsburgh	7
March 30, 2008	12:30 P.M.	NY Rangers	1	Pittsburgh	3
April 6, 2008	12:30 P.M.	Chicago	1	Detroit	4

==== 2008–09 season ====
Date	Time	Away team	Score	Home team	Score
January 18, 2009	12:30 P.M.	NY Rangers	0	Pittsburgh	3
February 8, 2009	12:30 P.M.	Detroit	2	Pittsburgh	0
February 15, 2009	12:30 P.M.	Philadelphia	5	NY Rangers	2
February 22, 2009	12:30 P.M.	Pittsburgh	2	Washington	5
March 8, 2009	12:30 P.M.	Boston	3	NY Rangers	4
March 15, 2009	12:30 P.M.	Philadelphia	1	NY Rangers	4
March 22, 2009	12:30 P.M.	Philadelphia	3	Pittsburgh	1
April 5, 2009	12:30 P.M.	Minnesota	2	Detroit	3
April 12, 2009	2 P.M.	Detroit	0	Chicago	3

=== 2010s ===
==== 2009–10 season ====
Date	Time	Away team	Score	Home team	Score
January 17, 2010	12:30 P.M.	Chicago	4 (SO)	Detroit	3
January 24, 2010	12:30 P.M.	Pittsburgh	2	Philadelphia	1
January 31, 2010	12:30 P.M.	Detroit	1	Pittsburgh	2 (SO)
February 7, 2010	12:00 P.M.	Pittsburgh	4	Washington	5 (OT)
March 7, 2010	12:30 P.M.	Detroit	5	Chicago	4
March 14, 2010	12:30 P.M.	Washington	4	Chicago	3
March 21, 2010	12:30 P.M.	NY Rangers	1	Boston	2
April 4, 2010	12:30 P.M.	Detroit	3	Philadelphia	4
April 11, 2010	12:00 P.M.	Boston	4 (SO)	Washington	3

==== 2010–11 season ====
Date	Time	Away team	Score	Home team	Score
January 23, 2011	12:30 P.M.	Philadelphia	4	Chicago	1
February 6, 2011	12:30 P.M.	Pittsburgh	0	Washington	3
February 13, 2011	12:30 P.M.	Boston	2	Detroit	4
February 20, 2011	12:35 P.M.	Washington	2	Buffalo	1
February 20, 2011	12:40 P.M.	Philadelphia	4	N.Y. Rangers	2
February 20, 2011	12:45 P.M.	Detroit	2 (SO)	Minnesota	1
February 20, 2011	3:30 P.M.	Pittsburgh	2	Chicago	3 (SO)
March 6, 2011	12:30 P.M.	Philadelphia	0	NY Rangers	7
March 13, 2011	12:30 P.M.	Chicago	3	Washington	4
March 20, 2011	12:30 P.M.	NY Rangers	5	Pittsburgh	2
April 3, 2011	12:30 P.M.	NY Rangers	3 (SO)	Philadelphia	2
April 10, 2011	12:30 P.M.	Detroit	4	Chicago	3

==== 2011–12 season ====
The Pittsburgh Penguins had an overall five network TV appearances during this season, making it the first NHL team in Pennsylvania and the first NHL team to have overall five network appearances in a regular season.

Date	Time	Away team	Score	Home team	Score
January 14, 2012	12:30 P.M.	Chicago	2	Detroit	3 (OT)
January 22, 2012	12:30 P.M.	Washington	3	Pittsburgh	4 (OT)
February 12, 2012	12:30 P.M.	Washington	2	NY Rangers	3
February 19, 2012	12:35 P.M.	Pittsburgh	2	Buffalo	6
February 19, 2012	12:40 P.M.	San Jose	2	Detroit	3
February 19, 2012	12:45 P.M.	St. Louis	1	Chicago	3
February 19, 2012	3:30 P.M.	Boston	0	Minnesota	2
March 4, 2012	12:30 P.M.	Boston	3	NY Rangers	4
March 11, 2012	12:30 P.M.	Boston	2	Pittsburgh	5
March 18, 2012	12:30 P.M.	Pittsburgh	2	Philadelphia	3 (OT)
April 1, 2012	12:30 P.M.	Philadelphia	6	Pittsburgh	4
April 7, 2012	1 P.M.	Chicago	3 (SO)	Detroit	2

==== 2012–13 season ====
Date	Time	Away team	Score	Home team	Score
January 19, 2013	3:25 P.M.	Chicago	5	Los Angeles	2
January 19, 2013	3:35 P.M.	Pittsburgh	3	Philadelphia	1
January 20, 2013	12:30 P.M.	Philadelphia	2	Buffalo	5
February 3, 2013	12:30 P.M.	Pittsburgh	6	Washington	3
February 10, 2013	12:30 P.M.	Los Angeles	2	Detroit	3
February 17, 2013	12:30 P.M.	Pittsburgh	4	Buffalo	3
February 17, 2013	3:30 P.M.	Los Angeles	2	Chicago	3
March 3, 2013	12:30 P.M.	Chicago	2 (SO)	Detroit	1
March 10, 2013	12:30 P.M.	NY Rangers	4	Washington	1
March 17, 2013	12:30 P.M.	Boston	1	Pittsburgh	2
March 31, 2013	12:30 P.M.	Chicago	7	Detroit	1
April 7, 2013	12:30 P.M.	St. Louis	1	Detroit	0
April 14, 2013	12:30 P.M.	Chicago	2	St. Louis	0
April 21, 2013	3 P.M.	New Jersey	1	NY Rangers	4
April 27, 2013	3 P.M.	New Jersey	0	NY Rangers	4

==== 2013–14 season ====
Date	Time	Away team	Score	Home team	Score
January 19, 2014	12:30 P.M.	Boston	2	Chicago	3 (SO)
January 26, 2014	12:30 P.M.	NY Rangers	7	New Jersey	3
February 2, 2014	12:30 P.M.	Detroit	5	Washington	6 (OT)
March 1, 2014	8 P.M.	Pittsburgh	1	Chicago	5
March 2, 2014	12:30 P.M.	Philadelphia	5 (OT)	Washington	4
March 9, 2014	12:30 P.M.	Detroit	0	NY Rangers	3
March 16, 2014	12:30 P.M.	Philadelphia	4	Pittsburgh	3
March 30, 2014	12:30 P.M.	Boston	4 (SO)	Philadelphia	3
April 6, 2014	12:30 P.M.	St. Louis	2	Chicago	4
April 12, 2014	3 P.M.	Philadelphia	4 (OT)	Pittsburgh	3
April 13, 2014	12:30 P.M.	Detroit	3	St. Louis	0

==== 2014–15 season ====
Date	Time	Away team	Score	Home team	Score
January 18, 2015	12:30 P.M.	NY Rangers	5	Pittsburgh	2
February 8, 2015	12:30 P.M.	Chicago	4	St. Louis	2
February 15, 2015	12:30 P.M.	Pittsburgh	1	Chicago	2 (SO)
February 22, 2015	12:30 P.M.	Washington	2	Philadelphia	3
February 22, 2015	3:30 P.M.	Boston	6	Chicago	2
February 28, 2015	8 P.M.	NY Rangers	2	Philadelphia	4
March 8, 2015	12:30 P.M.	Detroit	3	Boston	5
March 15, 2015	12:30 P.M.	Detroit	5	Pittsburgh	1
March 22, 2015	12 P.M.	St. Louis	1	Detroit	2 (OT)
April 5, 2015	12:30 P.M.	Pittsburgh	1	Philadelphia	4
April 11, 2015	3:11 P.M.	San Jose	1	Los Angeles	4
April 11, 2015	3:20 P.M.	Minnesota	2	St. Louis	4

==== 2015–16 season ====
NBC was supposed to air the Pittsburgh-Washington match-up on January 24, but however, the game was postponed due to hazardous weather, so the network instead selecting St. Louis-Chicago game as their match-up and it aired in the Primetime slot.

Date	Time	Away team	Score	Home team	Score
January 24, 2016	12:30 P.M.	Pittsburgh		Washington	PPD
January 24, 2016	7 P.M.	St. Louis	0	Chicago	2
February 7, 2016	12 P.M.	Philadelphia	2	Washington	3
February 14, 2016	3:30 P.M.	Boston	5	Detroit	6
February 21, 2016	12:30 P.M.	Pittsburgh	4	Buffalo	3
February 21, 2016	3:30 P.M.	Chicago	1	Minnesota	6
February 27, 2016	8 P.M.	Detroit	5	Colorado	3
February 28, 2016	12:30 P.M.	Washington	2	Chicago	3
March 13, 2016	12:30 P.M.	Pittsburgh	5	NY Rangers	3
April 3, 2016	12:30 P.M.	Boston	4	Chicago	6
April 9, 2016	3 P.M.	Pittsburgh	1	Philadelphia	3

==== 2016–17 season ====
During the season, NBC's Star Sunday concept was added to the Game of the Week package. The first game under the new brand took place on January 22, 2017, in a game between the New York Rangers and the Detroit Red Wings.

Date	Time	Away team	Score	Home team	Score
January 15, 2017	1:00 P.M.	Philadelphia	0	Washington	5
January 22, 2017* (Note: NBC selected Ryan McDonagh and Dylan Larkin as featured Star Sunday players for the game.)	12:30 P.M.	N.Y. Rangers	1	Detroit	0
February 5, 2017* (Note: NBC selected Jeff Carter and Alexander Ovechkin as featured Star Sunday players for the game.)	12 P.M.	Los Angeles	0	Washington	5
February 12, 2017* (Note: NBC selected Henrik Zetterberg and Devan Dubnyk as featured Star Sunday players for the game.)	3 P.M.	Detroit	3	Minnesota	6
February 19, 2017	12:30 P.M.	Washington	1	N.Y. Rangers	2
February 19, 2017	3:30 P.M.	Detroit	5	Pittsburgh	2
February 25, 2017	8 P.M.	Philadelphia	2	Pittsburgh	4
February 26, 2017* (Note: NBC selected David Pastrnak and Tyler Seguin as featured Star Sunday players for the game.)	12:30 P.M.	Boston	6	Dallas	3
March 12, 2017* (Note: NBC selected Eric Staal and Duncan Keith as featured Star Sunday players for the game.)	12:30 P.M.	Minnesota	2	Chicago	4
March 26, 2017* (Note: NBC selected Mikko Koivu as featured Star Sunday player for the game. No Red Wings player was selected; instead Joe Louis Arena was selected as the Red Wings' representative to mark the network's final game at the venue.)	12:30 P.M.	Minnesota	2	Detroit	3(OT)
April 2, 2017* (Note: NBC selected Patrice Bergeron and Brent Seabrook as featured Star Sunday players for the game.)	12:30 P.M.	Boston	3	Chicago	2
April 8, 2017	3 P.M.	Washington	3	Boston	1

(*) Designated as a Star Sunday game.

==== 2017–18 season ====
During this season, the Philadelphia Flyers had an overall five network TV appearances, making it the final NHL team in Pennsylvania and the second NHL team to have overall five network appearances (the first was Pittsburgh Penguins in 2011–12 season). NBC initially announced that no NHL games would be aired on the network during the 2018 Winter Olympics, however they changed course and added three Sunday afternoon games in February as a lead-in to the Winter Olympics, allowing Mike Emrick and Eddie Olczyk to stay home and call 3 NHL games. NBC correctly switched the final minutes of the 2018 NHL Stadium Series to its sister network NBCSN (except for viewers in the Washington D.C. market) at 11 p.m. Eastern Time after play stoppage due to the power outage delay. Star Sunday returned on March 11, 2018, both as part of the Game of the Week and Sunday Night Hockey package.

Date	Time	Away team	Score	Home team	Score
January 14, 2018	12:30 P.M.	Detroit	4	Chicago	0
January 21, 2018	12:30 P.M.	Philadelphia	2 (OT)	Washington	1
February 11, 2018	12:20 P.M.	Pittsburgh	4	St. Louis	1
February 18, 2018	12:20 P.M.	Philadelphia	7	N.Y. Rangers	5
February 25, 2018	12:20 P.M.	St. Louis	0	Nashville	4
March 3, 2018	8 P.M.	Toronto	2	Washington	5
March 11, 2018* (Note: NBC selected David Krejci and Patrick Kane as featured Star Sunday players for the game.)	12:30 P.M.	Boston	1	Chicago	3
March 25, 2018* (Note: NBC selected Claude Giroux and Sidney Crosby as featured Star Sunday players for the game.)	12:30 P.M.	Philadelphia	4	Pittsburgh	5 (OT)
April 1, 2018* (Note: NBC selected Wayne Simmonds and Patrice Bergeron as featured Star Sunday players for the game.)	12:30 P.M.	Boston	3	Philadelphia	4 (OT)
April 7, 2018	3 P.M.	N.Y. Rangers	0	Philadelphia	5

(*) Designated as a Star Sunday game.

==== 2018–19 season ====
For the first (and only) time, NBC selected two regional games which to aired it in primetime on February 2, 2019 dubbed as Primetime Saturday. Star Sunday returned on February 3, 2019, both as part of the Game of the Week and Sunday Night Hockey package. This marked the first and only season of Star Sunday to have its presenting sponsor; AT&T was the first presenting sponsor and they branded themselves as Star Sunday presented by AT&T.

Date	Time	Away team	Score	Home team	Score
January 20, 2019	12:30 P.M.	Washington	5	Chicago	8
February 2, 2019	8:11 P.M.	Tampa Bay	3	N.Y. Rangers	2
February 2, 2019	8:20 P.M.	Chicago	4 (OT)	Minnesota	3
February 3, 2019* (Note: NBC selected Alexander Ovechkin and Patrice Bergeron as featured Star Sunday players for the game.)	12:30 P.M.	Boston	1	Washington	0
February 10, 2019* (Note: NBC selected Vladimir Tarasenko and P. K. Subban as featured Star Sunday players for the game.)	12:30 P.M.	St. Louis	5(OT)	Nashville	4
February 17, 2019	12:30 P.M.	N.Y. Rangers	5	Pittsburgh	6
February 17, 2019	3:30 P.M.	St. Louis	4	Minnesota	0
February 23, 2019	8 P.M.	Pittsburgh	3	Philadelphia	4 (OT)
March 3, 2019* (Note: NBC selected Nicklas Backstrom and Mika Zibanejad as featured Star Sunday players for the game.)	12:30 P.M.	Washington	3 (SO)	N.Y. Rangers	2
March 24, 2019* (Note: NBC selected Claude Giroux and T. J. Oshie as featured Star Sunday players for the game.)	12:30 P.M.	Philadelphia	1	Washington	3
March 31, 2019* (Note: NBC selected Sean Couturier and Mika Zibanejad as featured Star Sunday players for the game.)	12:30 P.M.	N.Y. Rangers	3	Philadelphia	0

(*) Designated as a Star Sunday game.

=== 2020s ===
==== 2019–20 season (NBC) ====
For this season only, Brian Boucher joined Mike Emrick and Eddie Olczyk on the lead broadcast team while Pierre McGuire is reassigned to work with NBC's other broadcast teams. The Pittsburgh Penguins originally had six network television appearances during that season (for the first time since the 2011–12 season), however, due to the cancellation of their final two network TV appearances (the Washington-Pittsburgh match-up on March 22 and the Pittsburgh-Philadelphia match-up on March 29) because of the coronavirus pandemic, they reduced to four as the games are postponed due to the pandemic, in which the rest of the regular season was paused indefinitely due to the pandemic. All players and hockey staff were asked to self-quarantine in their home cities until further notice. On May 26, 2020, Gary Bettman, the NHL commissioner, was announced that the rest of the regular season was cancelled.

Date	Time	Away team	Score	Home team	Score
January 19, 2020	12:30 P.M.	Boston	3	Pittsburgh	4
February 2, 2020	12:30 P.M.	Pittsburgh	4	Washington	3
February 9, 2020	12:30 P.M.	Boston	1	Detroit	3
February 15, 2020	8 P.M.	Los Angeles	3	Colorado	1
February 16, 2020	12:30 P.M.	Detroit	1	Pittsburgh	5
February 16, 2020	3:30 P.M.	Boston	3	N.Y. Rangers	1
February 23, 2020	12 P.M.	Pittsburgh	3	Washington	5
March 1, 2020	12 P.M.	Philadelphia	5	N.Y. Rangers	3

==== 2020–21 season (NBC) ====
Due to the COVID-19 pandemic, the start of the 2020–21 NHL season has been delayed to January 13, 2021, and all teams would play a 56-game division-only schedule with the NHL temporarily realigning divisions to minimize travel as much as possible, with all seven Canadian teams playing one division due to COVID-19 cross-border travel restrictions imposed by the Government of Canada.

NBC Sports broadcast 16 NHL regular season games, which is the most ever NHL regular season games broadcast on NBC. The NHL on NBC schedule featured a number of rivalries, including the Capitals–Penguins rivalry, the Blackhawks–Red Wings rivalry, the Bruins-Rangers rivalry, and the Avalanche-Blues rivalry. Meanwhile, the Washington Capitals had five network television appearances this season, the third NHL team to have largest appearances during the regular season. The final NHL on NBC game was on May 8, 2021, with two games aired regionally, all but New York metro and Boston markets, who got the Penguins-Sabres game, got the Bruins-Rangers rivalry game, and the regional games were shared with the teams' respective broadcasters in their aforementioned markets. It also marked as the final season for the games to aired on NBC after 16 years, as 10 games were regained by over-the-air ABC beginning next season.

Date	Time	Away team	Score	Home team	Score
January 17, 2021	12 P.M.	Washington	3	Pittsburgh	4 (SO)
January 24, 2021	12:30 P.M.	Detroit	2	Chicago	6
February 7, 2021	12 P.M.	Philadelphia	7	Washington	4
February 14, 2021	3 P.M.	Washington	3	Pittsburgh	6
February 20, 2021	3 P.M. (Note: Game postponed after the first period due to weather concerns. Resumed at 12 A.M. on NBCSN.)	Vegas	2	Colorado	3
February 21, 2021	3 P.M. (Note: The Rangers were originally scheduled to be the Capitals' opponent, but that game was moved to March 20. As a result, the Capitals' home game against the Devils on March 7 was rescheduled to February 21, and due to the rescheduling of the Flyers–Bruins game at Lake Tahoe, this game was moved to the Game of the Week slot.)	New Jersey	3	Washington	4
February 28, 2021	12 P.M.	Boston	4	N.Y. Rangers	1
March 7, 2021	12 P.M.	Buffalo	2	N.Y. Islanders	5
March 28, 2021	12 P.M.	N.Y. Rangers	4	Washington	5
April 4, 2021	12 P.M.	Detroit	5	Tampa Bay	1
April 17, 2021	3 P.M.	Pittsburgh	3	Buffalo	2
April 18, 2021	12 P.M.	Washington	3	Boston	6
April 24, 2021	3 P.M.	Colorado	3	St. Louis	5
April 25, 2021	3 P.M.	Boston	0	Pittsburgh	1
May 2, 2021	3 P.M.	Tampa Bay	2	Detroit	1
May 8, 2021 (Note: The Rangers–Bruins game was televised in most markets, with MSG Network and NESN airing the game in the New York and Boston markets. The Sabres–Penguins game was televised exclusively in the New York and Boston markets, with MSG Western New York and AT&T SportsNet Pittsburgh airing the game in the Buffalo and Pittsburgh markets.)	3:11 P.M.	N.Y. Rangers	5	Boston	4
May 8, 2021	3:20 P.M.	Buffalo	0	Pittsburgh	1

==== 2021–22 season (ABC) ====
This season, ABC took over as the national over-the-air broadcaster for the NHL as part of a seven-year multiplatform deal with ESPN. They kicked off their coverage with the Thanksgiving Showdown on November 26. All games were simulcast on ESPN+, and featured a stats-based IceCast alternate broadcast, excluding the Thanksgiving Showdown.

Date	Teams	Start times (All times Eastern)	Play-by-play	Color commentator(s)	Ice-level analyst	Rinkside reporter	Rules analyst	Notes
November 26	New York Rangers vs. Boston Bruins	1 p.m.	Sean McDonough	Ray Ferraro	A. J. Mleczko	N/A	Dave Jackson	Bruins-Rangers rivalry 2021 NHL Thanksgiving Showdown; Originally Blues-Blackhawks, which filled the vacant 3:30 ET slot on ESPN+, which Rangers-Bruins had occupied
February 26	New York Rangers vs. Pittsburgh Penguins	3 p.m.	Sean McDonough	Ray Ferraro		Emily Kaplan	Dave Jackson	Penguins-Rangers rivalry 2022 Eastern Conference first round preview
March 5	Chicago Blackhawks vs. Philadelphia Flyers	3 p.m.	Sean McDonough	Ray Ferraro		Emily Kaplan	Dave Jackson	2010 Stanley Cup Final rematch
March 12	Philadelphia Flyers vs. Carolina Hurricanes	3 p.m.	Sean McDonough	Ray Ferraro		Emily Kaplan	Dave Jackson	
March 19	New York Rangers vs. Tampa Bay Lightning	8:00 p.m.	Sean McDonough	Ray Ferraro		Emily Kaplan	Dave Jackson	2022 Eastern Conference Finals preview First ever NHL regular season game on ABC to air in primetime
March 26	Chicago Blackhawks vs. Vegas Golden Knights	3 p.m.	Sean McDonough	Ray Ferraro		Emily Kaplan	Dave Jackson	2020 Western Conference first round rematch
April 2	Pittsburgh Penguins vs. Colorado Avalanche	3 p.m.	Sean McDonough	Ray Ferraro		Emily Kaplan	Dave Jackson	
April 9	Washington Capitals vs. Pittsburgh Penguins	3 p.m.	Sean McDonough	Ray Ferraro		Emily Kaplan	Dave Jackson	Capitals–Penguins rivalry Sidney Crosby vs. Alex Ovechkin
April 16	Minnesota Wild vs. St. Louis Blues	3 p.m.	Sean McDonough	Ray Ferraro		Emily Kaplan	Dave Jackson	2022 Winter Classic rematch 2022 Western Conference first round preview
April 23	New York Rangers vs. Boston Bruins	3 p.m.	Sean McDonough	Ray Ferraro		Emily Kaplan	Dave Jackson	Bruins-Rangers rivalry

==== Notes ====
- Outside of the Thanksgiving Showdown, ESPN produced an "IceCast" alternate broadcast. These broadcasts aired on ESPN+, alongside the ABC broadcast.

==== 2022–23 season (ABC) ====
ABC lost the rights to the Thanksgiving Showdown to TNT, but gained the rights to the NHL Stadium Series in return. ABC also introduced doubleheaders on select Saturdays, as well as a tripleheader during the last Saturday of the season.

Date	Teams	Start times (All times Eastern)	Play-by-play	Color commentator(s)	Ice-level analyst(s)	Rinkside reporter(s)	Rules analyst	Notes
February 11	Tampa Bay at Dallas	1 p.m.	Bob Wischusen	Brian Boucher	—N/a	Leah Hextall	Dave Jackson	2020 Stanley Cup Final rematch
February 11	Washington at Boston	3:30 p.m.	Sean McDonough	Ray Ferraro		Emily Kaplan	Dave Jackson	
February 18	Washington at Carolina	8 p.m.	Sean McDonough	Ray Ferraro		Emily Kaplan, Kevin Weekes, and Marty Smith	Dave Jackson	2023 NHL Stadium Series; Game was originally scheduled to air on ESPN
February 25	New York Rangers at Washington	1 p.m.	Sean McDonough	Ray Ferraro		Emily Kaplan	Dave Jackson	Capitals–Rangers rivalry
February 25	Pittsburgh at St. Louis	3:30 p.m.	Bob Wischusen	Brian Boucher	—N/a	Leah Hextall	Dave Jackson	
March 4	New York Rangers at Boston	1 p.m.	Sean McDonough	Ray Ferraro		Emily Kaplan	Dave Jackson	Bruins–Rangers rivalry
March 4	Colorado at Dallas	3:30 p.m.	Bob Wischusen	Brian Boucher	—N/a	Leah Hextall	Dave Jackson	
March 11	Detroit at Boston	1 p.m.	Sean McDonough	Ray Ferraro		Emily Kaplan	Dave Jackson	Bruins-Red Wings rivalry Bruins can clinch a playoff spot with a win and could become the fastest team to 50 wins.
March 11	Philadelphia at Pittsburgh	3:30 p.m.	Bob Wischusen	Brian Boucher	—N/a	Leah Hextall	Dave Jackson	Flyers–Penguins rivalry
March 18	Pittsburgh at New York Rangers	8 p.m.	Sean McDonough	Ray Ferraro		Emily Kaplan	Dave Jackson	Penguins–Rangers rivalry 2022 First Round rematch
March 25	Washington at Pittsburgh	8 p.m.	Sean McDonough	Ray Ferraro		Emily Kaplan	Dave Jackson	Capitals–Penguins rivalry Sidney Crosby vs. Alex Ovechkin
April 1	Boston at Pittsburgh	3 p.m.	Sean McDonough	Ray Ferraro		Emily Kaplan	Dave Jackson	2023 NHL Winter Classic rematch
April 8	Pittsburgh at Detroit	1 p.m.	Bob Wischusen	Brian Boucher	—N/a	Leah Hextall	Dave Jackson	Originally Blues-Wild; 2008 and 2009 Stanley Cup Final rematch
April 8	Vegas at Dallas	3:30 p.m.	Mike Monaco	A. J. Mleczko	—N/a		Dave Jackson	2023 Western Conference Finals preview
April 8	New Jersey at Boston	8 p.m.	Sean McDonough	Ray Ferraro		Emily Kaplan	Dave Jackson	Originally Penguins-Red Wings, which filled the 1 ET void left by Blues-Wild being flexed out Bruins can tie NHL team record for most wins in a regular season.

==== Notes ====
- ESPN produced alternate broadcasts of select games that streamed on ESPN+ along with the ABC broadcast. Those include the "Star Watch", "Puck Possessor", or an "All-12" broadcast for the Stadium Series.

==== 2023-24 season (ABC) ====
ABC had four doubleheader weeks this season, as well as the Stadium Series, and two tripleheaders, one on the same day as the first game of the Stadium Series, the other on the last Saturday of the season. All games will once again be simulcast on ESPN+.

Date	Teams	Start times (All times Eastern)	Play-by-play	Color commentator(s)	Ice-level analyst(s)	Rinkside reporter(s)	Rules analyst	Notes
January 13	New York Rangers at Washington	1 p.m.	Sean McDonough	Ray Ferraro		Emily Kaplan	Dave Jackson	Capitals–Rangers rivalry
February 10	St. Louis at Buffalo	1 p.m.	Bob Wischusen	A. J. Mleczko	—N/a	—N/a	Dave Jackson	
February 10	Washington at Boston	3:30 p.m.	Sean McDonough	Ray Ferraro		Emily Kaplan	Dave Jackson	
February 17	Los Angeles at Boston	12:30 p.m.	Bob Wischusen	Ryan Callahan	—N/a	Leah Hextall	Dave Jackson	Added to replace the Oilers-Bruins matchup for March 5 on ESPN+ and Hulu
February 17	Edmonton at Dallas	3 p.m.	Mike Monaco	A. J. Mleczko	—N/a		Dave Jackson	2024 Western Conference Finals preview First game on ABC to feature Canadian team since 2004 Stanley Cup Final
February 17	Philadelphia at New Jersey	8 p.m.	Sean McDonough	Ray Ferraro		Emily Kaplan and Kevin Weekes	Dave Jackson	Devils–Flyers rivalry 2024 NHL Stadium Series
February 18	New York Rangers at New York Islanders	3 p.m.	Sean McDonough	Ray Ferraro		Emily Kaplan and Kevin Weekes	Dave Jackson	Islanders–Rangers rivalry 2024 NHL Stadium Series
February 24	St. Louis at Detroit	noon.	Bob Wischusen	Kevin Weekes	—N/a	Leah Hextall	Dave Jackson	
February 24	New York Rangers vs. Philadelphia	3 p.m.	Sean McDonough	Ray Ferraro		Emily Kaplan	Dave Jackson	Flyers-Rangers rivalry Originally scheduled to air on ESPN+ and Hulu
March 2	Florida at Detroit	3 p.m.	Sean McDonough	Ray Ferraro		Emily Kaplan	Dave Jackson	Originally Wild-Blues
March 9	Carolina at New Jersey	12:30 p.m.	John Buccigross	Ryan Callahan	—N/a		Dave Jackson	2023 Conference Semifinals rematch Added to replace the Oilers-Sabres matchup scheduled to air on ESPN+ and Hulu that same day
March 9	Pittsburgh at Boston	3 p.m.	Sean McDonough	Ray Ferraro		Emily Kaplan	Dave Jackson	Alternate NHL Big City Greens Classic broadcast aired alongside ABC feed on Disney Channel, Disney XD, Disney+, and ESPN+
March 16	New York Rangers at Pittsburgh	3 p.m.	Sean McDonough	Ray Ferraro		Emily Kaplan	Dave Jackson	Penguins-Rangers rivalry
March 23	Florida at New York Rangers	8 p.m.	Sean McDonough	Ray Ferraro		Emily Kaplan	Dave Jackson	2024 Eastern Conference Finals preview
April 6	Tampa Bay at Pittsburgh	1 p.m.	Bob Wischusen	Ryan Callahan	—N/a	Leah Hextall	Dave Jackson	
April 6	Florida at Boston	3:30 p.m.	Sean McDonough	Ray Ferraro		Emily Kaplan	Dave Jackson	2023 First Round rematch
April 13	New York Islanders at New York Rangers	12:30 p.m.	Bob Wischusen	Ryan Callahan	—N/a	Leah Hextall	Dave Jackson	Islanders-Rangers rivalry 2024 Stadium Series rematch
April 13	Seattle at Dallas	3 p.m.	Mike Monaco	A. J. Mleczko	—N/a	Blake Bolden	Dave Jackson	2023 Conference Semifinals rematch
April 13	Boston at Pittsburgh	8 p.m.	Sean McDonough	Ray Ferraro		Emily Kaplan	Dave Jackson	

==== 2024–25 season (ABC) ====
ABC aired six doubleheaders, as well as the Saturday games of the NHL 4 Nations Face-Off. There were no tripleheaders this season as a result of the 4 Nations break, as well as scheduling conflicts. In addition to ESPN+, all ABC games this season are also simulcast on Disney+.

Date	Teams	Start times (All times Eastern)	Play-by-play	Color commentator(s)	Ice-level analyst(s)	Rinkside reporter(s)	Rules analyst	Notes
January 4	New York Rangers at Washington	noon.	Bob Wischusen	Ray Ferraro		Emily Kaplan	Dave Jackson	Capitals–Rangers rivalry
January 5	New York Rangers at Chicago	3 p.m.	Mike Monaco	Ryan Callahan	—N/a	Leah Hextall	Dave Jackson	
January 11	Boston at Florida	1 p.m.	Bob Wischusen	Ray Ferraro		Emily Kaplan	Dave Jackson	2023 First Round and 2024 Conference Semifinals rematch
February 1	Chicago at Florida	1 p.m.	John Buccigross	Ryan Callahan	—N/a	Leah Hextall	Dave Jackson	Bob Wischusen was originally scheduled to call the game, but John Buccigross replaced him due to Wischusen having an illness.
February 1	New York Rangers at Boston	3:30 p.m.	Mike Monaco	Ray Ferraro		Emily Kaplan	Dave Jackson	Bruins–Rangers rivalry Sean McDonough was originally scheduled to call the game, but Mike Monaco replaced him due to McDonough having an illness.
February 8	Tampa Bay at Detroit	1 p.m.	Bob Wischusen	A. J. Mleczko	—N/a	Leah Hextall	Dave Jackson	
February 8	Vegas at Boston	3:30 p.m.	Mike Monaco	Ray Ferraro		Emily Kaplan	Dave Jackson	Sean McDonough was originally scheduled to call the game, but Mike Monaco replaced him due to McDonough having an illness.
February 15	Finland vs. Sweden	1 p.m.	Bob Wischusen	Ray Ferraro		Emily Kaplan	Dave Jackson	2025 4 Nations Face-Off pool play
February 15	United States at Canada	8 p.m.	Sean McDonough	Ray Ferraro		Emily Kaplan	Dave Jackson	2025 4 Nations Face-Off pool play
February 22	Minnesota at Detroit	12:30 p.m.	Bob Wischusen	Ryan Callahan	—N/a	Leah Hextall	Dave Jackson	
February 22	Washington at Pittsburgh	3 p.m.	Sean McDonough	Ray Ferraro		Emily Kaplan	Dave Jackson	Capitals–Penguins rivalry Sidney Crosby vs. Alex Ovechkin
March 1	Boston at Pittsburgh	3 p.m.	Bob Wischusen	Ryan Callahan	—N/a	Leah Hextall	Dave Jackson	
March 8	Seattle at Philadelphia	12:30 p.m.	Bob Wischusen	P. K. Subban	—N/a	Leah Hextall	Dave Jackson	
March 8	Boston at Tampa Bay	3 p.m.	Sean McDonough	Ray Ferraro		Emily Kaplan	Dave Jackson	
March 15	New Jersey at Pittsburgh	3 p.m.	Sean McDonough	Ray Ferraro		Emily Kaplan	Dave Jackson	
March 22	Detroit at Vegas	8 p.m.	Steve Levy	Ray Ferraro		Emily Kaplan	Dave Jackson	
March 29	Boston at Detroit	8 p.m.	Sean McDonough	Ray Ferraro		Emily Kaplan	Dave Jackson	Bruins-Red Wings rivalry
April 5	New York Rangers at New Jersey	12:30 p.m.	Sean McDonough	Ray Ferraro		Emily Kaplan	Dave Jackson	Devils–Rangers rivalry
April 5	Pittsburgh at Dallas	3 p.m.	Bob Wischusen	Ryan Callahan	—N/a	Leah Hextall	Dave Jackson	1991 Stanley Cup Final rematch
April 12	Washington at Columbus	12:30 p.m.	Sean McDonough	Ray Ferraro		Emily Kaplan	Dave Jackson	Originally Islanders-Flyers
April 12	New York Rangers at Carolina	3 p.m.	Bob Wischusen	Ryan Callahan	—N/a	Leah Hextall	Dave Jackson	2024 Conference Semifinals rematch
