= NHL on television in the 2010s =

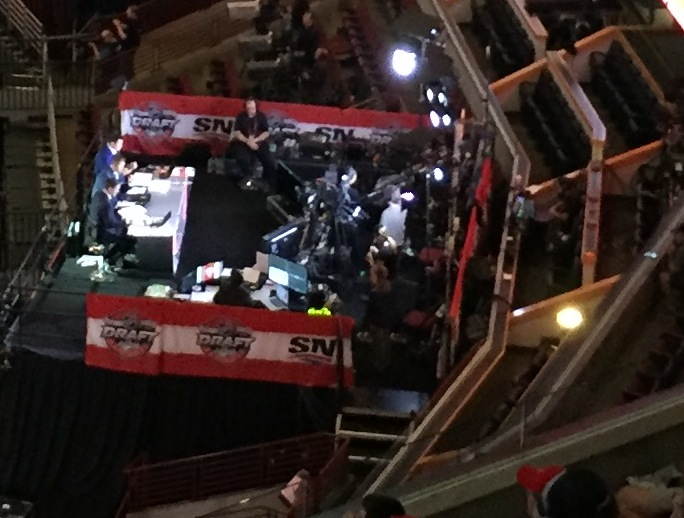
The Sportsnet broadcasting booth covering the 2017 NHL entry draft. Sportsnet became the primary Canadian national rightsholder in 2014.

On April 19, 2011, after ESPN, Turner Sports, and Fox Sports placed bids, NBC Sports announced it had reached a ten-year extension to its U.S. television contract with the NHL (through the 2020–21 season) worth nearly $2 billion over the tenure of the contract. The contract would cover games on both NBC and sister cable channel Versus, which became part of the NBC Sports family as the result of Versus parent Comcast's controlling purchase of NBC Universal earlier in 2011.

CBC's deal with the NHL ran through the 2013–14 season, and was replaced in 2014–15 by a sublicensing deal with Rogers Communications (see below). The deal includes airings of games on the conventional over-the-air CBC Television network as well as carriage of those broadcasts through digital media, including CBCSports.ca. Rogers's Sportsnet would produce those games on CBC as well as also air games on their own networks. The deal came after controversy and discussion before and during the 2006-07 NHL season, when private broadcaster CTVglobemedia attempted to acquire exclusive Canadian distribution rights to the NHL for its own networks, including broadcast network CTV and cable channels TSN and RDS. Such a package, which would have left CBC without NHL hockey, would have increased TSN's previously existing coverage of NHL games; the attempt also came at a time when CTVglobemedia had outbid the CBC for Canadian television rights to the 2010 and 2012 Olympics (along with Rogers Media), as well as the major television package for curling. Despite the rumours, it always seemed that CTV was unlikely to be interested in the nightly playoff coverage currently provided by the CBC, since weeknight games in April and May would conflict with new episodes of CTV's slate of American programming. As well, the title Hockey Night in Canada could not be used as the name is owned by CBC, unless CTVglobemedia were to pay royalties to CBC for use of the name. The current deal with CBC and Rogers maintains the 65-plus-year tradition of Hockey Night in Canada on CBC, but also allows Rogers to expand its coverage. A caveat of the deal limits CBC to the number of games per Canadian team it can show so that the seven Canadian-based teams, particularly the Toronto Maple Leafs, can distribute more games to regional carriers, thereby increasing the value of their local packages.

== Year-by-year breakdown ==
=== 2010 ===
For years, all playoff games involving Canadian teams were aired by the CBC, though not always on a national basis. From 2008 through 2014, rights to individual series were instead picked using a draft-like setup; in the first round, CBC first, second, fourth, and sixth selections among opening round series, and TSN had the third, fifth, seventh, and eighth selections. CBC tended to select series involving at least one Canadian team and series involving teams with strong Canadian fanbases (such as Boston, Buffalo, Detroit, and Pittsburgh); as a result of this arrangement, if more than two Canadian teams qualified for the playoffs, it was likely that at least one series involving a Canadian team would be broadcast by TSN.

On July 23, 2010, Trevor Pilling was named the executive producer of Hockey Night in Canada, replacing Sherali Najak.

=== 2011 ===
NBC renewed its rights to the NHL for the 2010–11 season. The network broadcast schedule continued to include the Winter Classic, Sunday-afternoon games at 12:30 p.m. Eastern Time, six weekends of playoff action, and broadcasts of all but Games 3 and 4 of the Stanley Cup Final.

On February 20, 2011, NBC introduced Hockey Day in America – patterned after the CBC's Hockey Day in Canada, it featured eight of the most popular American teams in regional games: the Washington Capitals at the Buffalo Sabres, the Philadelphia Flyers at the New York Rangers, and the Detroit Red Wings at the Minnesota Wild, followed by the Pittsburgh Penguins at the Chicago Blackhawks for the national nightcap. The Flyers-Rangers game was aired in the majority of the country, while the Sabres-Capitals game was only seen in the Buffalo and Washington, D.C. markets; as was the Red Wings-Wild game in their respective markets. The tripleheader would be completed with the 2011 Heritage Classic, for which viewers were redirected to Versus.

On April 19, 2011, after ESPN, Turner Sports and Fox Sports placed bids, NBC Sports announced it had reached a ten-year extension to its television contract with the NHL (through the 2020–21 season) worth nearly $2 billion over the tenure of the contract. The contract would cover games on both NBC and sister cable channel Versus, which became part of the NBC Sports family as the result of Versus parent Comcast's controlling purchase of NBC Universal earlier in 2011. In relation to the contract's announcement, Versus would receive a new name to reflect its synergy with NBC Sports; the channel rebranded as NBC Sports Network on January 2, 2012 (it would later be abbreviated on-air and then officially shortened to NBCSN); NHL coverage on Versus would begin to be produced identically to NBC's NHL coverage beginning in the 2011–12 season, leading up to the brand change.

The terms of the deal included:

- A rights fee of roughly US$200 million per year for the combined cable and broadcast rights, nearly triple that of the previous contract;
- Increased weekly regular season coverage on Versus/NBCSN (as many as 90 games per season on Monday, Tuesday and Wednesday nights), with Sunday night games also being added by the channel later in the season.
- Rights to an annual "Thanksgiving Showdown" game airing on NBC the day after Thanksgiving ("Black Friday" afternoon) (the 2012 edition was cancelled due to the 2012–13 NHL lockout). The November broadcast is the earliest an NHL regular season game has aired on a broadcast television network in the U.S. since the 1950s, when the league still only had six teams. The 2013 "Thanksgiving Showdown" game featured the Boston Bruins hosting the New York Rangers; it was widely expected that Boston will remain the home team in future years and launch a holiday tradition for the league and network (Boston has hosted matinee games the day after Thanksgiving since the 1980s), much like Detroit and Dallas traditionally host National Football League games on Thanksgiving Day; however, NBC decided to end this tradition for the 2014–15 season, with a Black Friday matinee between the Philadelphia Flyers and New York Rangers being aired instead, while Boston held a locally televised game on the evening of Black Friday in 2014. Boston resumed hosting the game in 2015, with a second Black Friday game (Chicago at Anaheim) airing later in the afternoon on NBCSN.
- Continued coverage on NBC of the NHL Winter Classic, to be played on New Year's Day unless that day lands on a Sunday, in which case the game is moved to January 2 (despite the open time slot on Sunday afternoons, NBC is effectively forbidden via a gentleman's agreement with the NFL which prevents any form of strong counterprogramming against NFL games televised on CBS and Fox). Initially the Classic was expected to be played in primetime, however to date every game has been scheduled for a 1 PM ET start, and due to new competition from the College Football Playoff the game is now expected to remain a daytime game for the foreseeable future. NBC has instead opted to air one prime time game each year, later in the season, since 2014.
- A national "Game of the Week" continuing on NBC as in previous years, beginning each January (January is the start month due to NBC's contract with the NFL).
- Hockey Day in America becoming a permanent annual part of the NBC schedule.
- Rights to any future Heritage Classics, which would be aired on NBCSN.
- Digital rights across all platforms for any games broadcast by NBC or NBCSN.
- Increased coverage of Stanley Cup Playoff games, with all playoff games airing nationally on NBC, NBCSN, CNBC, USA and NHL Network. (MSNBC and even Golf Channel have also been used for Stanley Cup playoff games.) Local sports networks can carry their teams' first-round games, but any games on NBC, and any NBC cable games from the second round onward, will be exclusive to NBC.
- Continued sharing of the Stanley Cup Final on NBC (which will air Games 1, 2, and all "if needed" games) and NBCSN (Games 3 and 4). The deal gives NBC the option of moving Games 3 and 4 to the broadcast network. During the 2013 Stanley Cup Final, NBC aired Games 1, 4, 5, 6 and 7 while NBCSN aired Games 2 and 3.

Currently, NHL regular season games on NBC are exclusive to the network. While most NHL games on NBCSN are exclusive (such as Wednesday Night Hockey), other games carried by the network may be blacked out regionally in favor of television stations or regional sports networks which hold the local broadcast rights to an NHL franchise. Among the games normally blacked out from NBCSN include teams that are carried by their respective NBC Sports Regional Networks (Chicago Blackhawks broadcasts are shared between NBC Sports Chicago and WGN), as well as the Boston Bruins (NESN), Detroit Red Wings (Fox Sports Detroit), New York Rangers (MSG) and Pittsburgh Penguins (AT&T SportsNet Pittsburgh).

=== 2012 ===
In preparation for the re-launch of Versus as NBC Sports Network (later NBCSN) in January 2012 as part of a major re-launch of the NBC Sports division coinciding with the 2012 NHL Winter Classic, all broadcasts on Versus transitioned to the NHL on NBC branding and presentation beginning in the 2011–12 season.

Since the 2011–12 season, NBC Sports and NBCSN have exclusive rights to the entire Stanley Cup playoffs starting in Conference Semifinals, and non-exclusive rights for the First Round, and will air each game nationally.

=== 2013 ===
In the 2012–13 season, Wednesday night games on NBCSN were rebranded as Wednesday Night Rivalry, primarily featuring rivalry games. For the 2013–14 season, NBC Sports introduced the series NHL Rivals, which looks back at the participating teams' historic rivalry leading up to the featured Wednesday Night Rivalry game.

On November 26, 2013, Rogers Communications publicly announced its 12-year deal to become the exclusive national rightsholder for the National Hockey League beginning in the 2014–15 season. Valued at $5.2 billion over the length of the contract, and covering television and digital rights to the league (national French rights were sub-licensed to Quebecor Media for TVA Sports), the value of the contract surpasses the league's most recent U.S. rights deal with NBC by more than double. Under the contract, Rogers paid $150 million upfront, and will make annual payments beginning at $300 million, escalating to $500 million over the life of the contract. As part of the deal, Rogers also took over Canadian distribution of the NHL Centre Ice and GameCentre Live services. Rogers Media president Keith Pelley emphasized the increased amount and accessibility of NHL content that Rogers planned to offer under the deal, stating that "Canadians will have more games, more content and more choice than they've ever had before." Also of note was Rogers' plans to maintain the long-running Hockey Night in Canada on CBC through a sub-licensing agreement with the league's previous broadcast television rightsholder, but also extend the brand by airing Hockey Night games across its own networks alongside CBC.

Critics considered the deal to be a major coup against Bell Media, showing concerns for how its sports networks, particularly TSN, could sustain themselves without what they considered to be a key sports property in Canada. TSN and RDS still retain some NHL coverage as of the 2014–15 season, including TSN's existing rights to the Winnipeg Jets, an extension of French-language rights to the Montreal Canadiens for RDS, along with newly introduced regional coverage of the Toronto Maple Leafs for TSN (which are split with Sportsnet per Bell and Rogers' joint majority ownership of its parent company), and the Ottawa Senators for both TSN and RDS.

=== 2014 ===
As reflected by its influence, Fox Sports Net (Fox also held a minority stake in the channel upon its launch), Sportsnet and its four regional feeds also picked up regional broadcast rights to other Canadian NHL teams. As of the 2013–14 season, Sportsnet held regional rights to five of the seven Canadian franchises, including the Ottawa Senators, Toronto Maple Leafs (which are jointly owned by Rogers and Bell Canada through a majority stake in MLSE), Edmonton Oilers, Calgary Flames, and Vancouver Canucks. Rights to the remaining two, the Montreal Canadiens and Winnipeg Jets, and national cable rights to the league as a whole, were held by the competing network TSN. National broadcast television rights were held by CBC Television, who used its rights to broadcast the long-running Hockey Night in Canada on Saturday nights, and share coverage of the post-season with TSN (including exclusive rights to the Stanley Cup Final).

In the 2013–14 season, Sportsnet lost the Senators to TSN, but acquired rights to the Canadiens to replace them on Sportsnet East under a three-year deal. The contract expired after the 2016–17 season, and the team moved to TSN2 the following season; TSN's owner Bell holds an ownership stake in the Canadiens, as well as its regional French-language rights. Both Rogers and Bell own stakes in the Maple Leafs and split broadcast rights between them.

On February 4, 2014, at the NHL's upfronts, Rogers unveiled more detailed plans for its NHL coverage. In preparation for the transition, Rogers and the NHL sought input from viewers via online surveys and a "listening tour" through locations within Canadian NHL markets, along with Kingston, Sudbury, and Red Deer, Alberta. These efforts focused primarily on gauging how viewers (including "core" fans, younger viewers, and those new to the country) consume NHL content, and help determine how Rogers would present, market, and distribute its overall coverage to these varying demographics. The hiring of George Stroumboulopoulos—the former host of a self-titled CBC talk show and an alumnus of the now-Rogers owned sports radio station CJCL—as the main on-air host of Hockey Night, was intended to help the telecasts appeal to a younger audience. Rogers also announced plans to use its multicultural Omni Television stations to broadcast a doubleheader of Hockey Night in Canada games with commentary in Punjabi (carrying over from CBC's past digital coverage of games in the language), and ancillary hockey content in 22 languages, such as Hockey 101—an instructional series explaining the basic rules and concepts of hockey.

Rogers sought to increase the prominence of NHL content on digital platforms by re-launching the NHL's digital out-of-market sports package GameCentre Live as Rogers NHL GameCentre Live, adding the ability to stream all of Rogers' national NHL telecasts, along with in-market streaming of regional games for teams whose regional rights are held by Sportsnet. GamePlus—an additional mode featuring alternate camera angles intended for a second screen experience, such as angles focusing on certain players, net and referee cameras, and a Skycam in selected venues, was also added exclusively for GameCentre Live subscribers who are subscribed to Rogers' cable, internet, or wireless services.

Regular-season NHL telecasts on NBC itself usually only feature U.S.-based teams. During the Stanley Cup playoffs, broadcasting a game involving a Canadian team might be unavoidable. NBC has the first choice of games and times on its scheduled broadcast dates. The Canadian broadcasters (currently CBC and Sportsnet) are required to adjust accordingly during the playoffs, even though their rights fee is three times as high as NBC's.

There have been a few exceptions to this policy since 2006; in 2008, the Montreal Canadiens became the first Canadian team featured on the NHL on NBC during the regular season (NBC Sports' Dick Ebersol was rumored to have specifically wanted to do a game from Montreal at some point). The Canadiens played the New York Rangers on February 3. The 2014 NHL Winter Classic also featured a Canadian team, the Toronto Maple Leafs, up against the Detroit Red Wings at Michigan Stadium. Due to the revamp of the league's conferences and divisions that season, the cross-border rivalry had become an interdivisional one with the Wings' move to the Eastern Conference.

During the first three rounds of the playoffs, the NHL usually gives higher priority to NBC's requests to schedule afternoon games on the weekends, which results in little or no post-season contests on Saturday nights. This may include holding a playoff game on Saturday afternoon even if a Canadian club is the home team (like Game 1 of the 2014 Eastern Conference Final hosted by the Montreal Canadiens).

In 2014, NBCSN broadcast Games 3 and 4, while NBC televised the remaining games. NBC Sports originally planned to repeat its coverage pattern from the last few seasons: NBCSN would televise Game 2 and 3, while NBC would broadcast Game 1, and then Games 4 and 5. After the League scheduled Game 2 on the day of the Belmont Stakes, coverage of Games 2 and 4 were switched so NBC's telecast of the horse race would serve as lead-in programming to game two. Due to the death of a family member, NBC lead play-by-play announcer Mike Emrick missed Game 1. Kenny Albert, who was also the New York Rangers radio announcer for WEPN and announced several national games (including the Western Conference Finals) for NBC/NBCSN, filled in for Emrick in the first game.

Sportsnet's coverage premiered on October 8, 2014, with an opening night doubleheader of Scotiabank Wednesday Night Hockey, featuring the Montreal Canadiens at the Toronto Maple Leafs, followed by the Calgary Flames and the Vancouver Canucks. The inaugural game was the most-watched program of the night in Canada, and the most-watched telecast in Sportsnet's history, with 2.01 million viewers (beating the previous record of 1.44 million set by the Toronto Blue Jays' home opener in 2013, but since surpassed by multiple games of the 2015 American League Division Series involving the Blue Jays, which topped out at 4.38 million viewers for game 4). However, viewership was down from 2013's opening night game, which was televised by CBC.

=== 2015 ===
In the lead-up to the 2014–15 season, Rogers began to promote its networks as the new home of the NHL through a multi-platform advertising campaign; the campaign featured advertising and cross-promotions across Rogers' properties, such as The Shopping Channel, which began to feature presentations of NHL merchandise, and its parenting magazine Today's Parent, which began to feature hockey-themed stories in its issues. On May 28, 2014, Rogers announced a six-year sponsorship deal with Scotiabank, which saw the bank become the title sponsor for Wednesday Night Hockey and Hockey Day in Canada, and become a sponsor for other segments and initiatives throughout Rogers' NHL coverage.

Beginning in the 2014–15 season, owing to Bell Canada's ownership stake in the Leafs' owner, Maple Leaf Sports & Entertainment and the loss of TSN's national cable rights, TSN began to air 26 regional games per season, split with Sportsnet Ontario, and aired by TSN4.

Also beginning in the 2014–15 season, TSN Hockey personalities Bob McKenzie, Darren Dreger and Chris Cuthbert joined the NHL on NBC team. This was the result of Rogers Media's – the owners of Sportsnet – exclusive 12-year deal with the NHL in Canada replacing both TSN and CBC Sports as the rightsholders to the NHL.

From 2014 to 2016, George Stroumboulopoulos served as the studio host for Hockey Night in Canada. Jeff Marek hosts Wednesday Night Hockey, while Caroline Cameron hosts Thursday night games along with Hockey Central Saturday. As of the 2018–19 season, Ron MacLean was reinstated as Hockey Night host; he continued to host the traditional Coach's Corner segment with Don Cherry until November 2019. MacLean also serves as the on-location host for Hometown Hockey, accompanied by Citytv Calgary's Breakfast Television host Tara Slone. MacLean, Cherry, and Oake were still under contract with the CBC, with Cherry under contract through 2018, and MacLean through at least 2016 for the 2016 Summer Olympics.

In 2015, NBC Sports partnered with the league to expand Kraft Hockeyville into the United States. The annual contest, in which communities compete to demonstrate their commitment to ice hockey, with the winning community being awarded the opportunity to host a nationally televised NHL preseason game, was first held across Canada in 2006. Similar to what CBC Sports had done in covering Kraft Hockeyville in Canada, NBC Sports began airing regular segments on the separate Hockeyville USA competition for communities in the U.S. On September 29, 2015, NBCSN aired the inaugural Kraft Hockeyville USA game at Cambria County War Memorial Arena, Johnstown, Pennsylvania, marking the first time that the NHL on NBC televised a preseason game since it acquired the American rights in 2005.

By January 2015, average viewership for Hockey Night east-coast games fell to 1.69 million viewers, in comparison to the average 1.8 million that CBC brought at the same point in the previous season; the poor performance of the heavily viewed Toronto Maple Leafs was partially blamed for the decline. Ratings for the 2015 NHL All-Star Game also fell sharply, losing over half its viewers in comparison to the 2012 edition. Moore disputed the accuracy of Numeris's numbers, arguing that they did not properly account for multi-platform viewership, and that its ratings panel did not cover enough sports-oriented demographics. Numeris acknowledged that it would look into Rogers' complaints, but noted that its ratings panels were meant to represent a wide array of Canadian demographics, and that, although they are not yet reported separately, its ratings did account for viewership on digital platforms. The Maple Leafs' ratings would fall as low as 743,000 viewers. Aggregate ratings began to recover by March; the March 21 east coast games (which saw the Maple Leafs' game moved to Sportsnet in favor of a Montreal Canadiens game on CBC) drew aggregate ratings of around 2.2 million viewers across CBC, City, and Sportsnet, with the Canadiens bringing 922,000 viewers.

As part of a 2011 contract renewal, Comcast's properties earned exclusive national rights for all Stanley Cup playoffs through 2021. Because NBC and NBC Sports Network could not carry all of the games on those two outlets alone, other Comcast properties would need to be used; USA was initially not used, due to the risk of preempting its popular prime time lineup, and the company instead used CNBC and NHL Network as the overflow channels for the first four years of the contract. In 2015, Comcast announced that USA would carry some games in the first two rounds of the Stanley Cup Playoffs, mainly on Tuesday and Wednesday nights, returning the NHL to USA for the first time since 1985.

Viewership rebounded for the 2015 Stanley Cup Playoffs, with five Canadian teams involved in the first round; average viewership of first-round games increased over the previous season, with one of the games in the Ottawa Senators and Montreal Canadiens' first round series on CBC seen by 3.76 million viewers. However, following the elimination of all Canadian teams from contention, ratings dropped significantly, with Numeris estimating an overall decrease of 8% in average viewership on CBC, and a 14% decrease in average viewership for Sportsnet in comparison to TSN's 2014 playoff coverage. With 2.62 million viewers, Game 6 of the Stanley Cup Final was the lowest-rated deciding game since Game 7 in 2003; the game competed against a match of the 2015 FIFA Women's World Cup involving Team Canada on CTV and TSN (1.8 million), and a Toronto Blue Jays/New York Mets game on Sportsnet (782,000; the team was in the midst of a major winning streak).

It was originally announced that Games 2 and 3 of the 2015 Final were to be broadcast by NBCSN, with the remainder on NBC. Game 2 was moved to NBC to serve as a lead-out for its coverage of the 2015 Belmont Stakes in favor of Game 4 on NBCSN. As Eddie Olczyk was also a contributor to NBC's Belmont coverage, he was absent during Game 2.

=== 2016 ===
During the 2015–16 season, exclusive Sunday night games on NBCSN were rebranded as Sunday Night Hockey, with the first game under the new brand taking place on January 10, 2016, between the New Jersey Devils and the Minnesota Wild. A weekly recap show, NHL Sunday Shootout, premiered on the same day. NBC also began to air select Game of the Week and Sunday Night Hockey broadcasts under the Star Sunday banner starting with the 2016–17 season, devoting special coverage to the game's featured players of the week.

Like its predecessors, NBC frequently chooses games with a focus on about six teams: New York Rangers, Detroit Red Wings, Pittsburgh Penguins, Boston Bruins, and most recently the Washington Capitals and Chicago Blackhawks. The relation has very little correlation with team success; for instance, the Anaheim Ducks won the Stanley Cup in 2007, and the Buffalo Sabres made it to the conference finals in both 2006 and 2007. Those teams received one and two potential games respectively in the 2008 season, compared to the seven potential games given to the Rangers and the four games which could include the rival Philadelphia Flyers. (Buffalo has fared better in its number of NBCSN appearances, due in part to the channel's relatively high viewership in the Buffalo market; it was noted in 2018 that their appearances on that network were in decline.)

The most frequently cited reasons for this relative lack of diversity are low ratings in a market (such as for Anaheim, which competes with the older Los Angeles Kings in its market), market size (such as for Buffalo, where hockey ratings are the highest of any U.S. team, but the market itself is the smallest of any American NHL team), and Comcast's common ownership of both the Flyers and NBC, allowing the network to self-deal and cross-promote the Flyers on national television.

Examples of the above trends could be found in NBC Sports' national schedule for the 2015-16 regular season. In a press release announcing this schedule, NBC stated all U.S. teams would make at least one appearance on NBC or NBCSN during the regular season, but hockey writer Greg Wyshynski noted that:

- The Chicago Blackhawks (21), Pittsburgh Penguins and Philadelphia Flyers (tied at 18), Detroit Red Wings (16), and New York Rangers (13) made the most appearances on the schedule. The Flyers were tied for second despite missing the playoffs during the previous season.
- Five U.S. teams (the Arizona Coyotes, Carolina Hurricanes, Columbus Blue Jackets, Florida Panthers, and New Jersey Devils) only made 1 appearance each, while the Montreal Canadiens made 6 total appearances.
- The Anaheim Ducks, who advanced to the conference finals during the previous season, only made 4 appearances, while the Los Angeles Kings and the San Jose Sharks, who both missed the playoffs, appear ed 10 and 11 times, respectively.
- The only Canadian teams to be scheduled were the Edmonton Oilers (despite drafting top prospect Connor McDavid with the first pick in the 2015 NHL entry draft) and Toronto Maple Leafs (despite having hired long-time Detroit Red Wings head coach Mike Babcock), both with one appearance each. The four remaining teams, who did each advance to the playoffs during the previous season, did not appear.

Due to the revamp of the league's conferences and divisions that season, the cross-border rivalry had become an interdivisional one with the Wings' move to the Eastern Conference. The 2016 NHL Winter Classic had the Montreal Canadiens facing the Boston Bruins in Foxboro, Massachusetts. The Boston/Montreal rivalry is generally considered the fiercest in the NHL; in fact, there were rumblings that if Montreal were not Boston's opponent in the 2016 Classic that Boston would relinquish the game. NBCSN will occasionally feature Canadian teams during the regular season, but primarily only the Canadiens and the Maple Leafs, and only if they are playing a U.S.-based team. The NHL Heritage Classic matchups are the only all-Canadian regular season games that NBCSN has broadcast.

On May 27, 2016, NBC Sports announced that if the Final was tied at 1-1 entering Game 3, then it would have aired on NBC and Game 4 televised on NBCSN. However, if one team led 2-0 (as this eventually happened), Game 3 moved to NBCSN and then Game 4 on NBC.

The 2016 season saw major ratings declines, with Hockey Night in Canada down 18%, Hometown Hockey down 34%, and ratings for the 2016 Stanley Cup playoffs were down by 61% over the first five days of play, as no Canadian team made the playoffs for the first time since 1970. The lack of Canadian teams resulted in cuts to coverage; Sportsnet used just three dedicated play-by-play crews during the first round (with a fourth used for select games) and only produced its own coverage for games which aired on the CBC (all other games were simulcast from U.S. broadcasters).

=== 2017 ===
Beginning during the 2016–17 season, NBC began to leverage its regional networks (then primarily-branded as Comcast SportsNet) to originate coverage of first-round games involving teams whose regional rights are owned by an NBC (in this case, Chicago, San Jose, and Washington). These broadcasts used the video footage from the regional broadcaster, overlaid with different commentary.

In 2017, five Canadian teams qualified for the first round of the playoffs, which was expected to improve ratings. Scott Moore told The New York Times that he was extremely positive over the large number of Canadian teams in contention—this time including the top Canadian media market of Toronto. He warned that "there's going to be a year where Edmonton is playing Montreal in the Stanley Cup final, and someone will think I'm a genius."

=== 2018 ===
Prior to the 2017–18 season, TSN announced that they have reacquired the English-language rights to broadcast Canadiens games, replacing Sportsnet. John Bartlett, who handled play-by-play for Canadiens games on Sportsnet East, also moved to TSN, but returned to Sportsnet the following season. Soon after, long-time TSN talent Bryan Mudryk took over play-by-play duties.

As of the 2017–18 season, Sportsnet's regional feeds collectively hold regional broadcast rights to four of the seven Canadian NHL franchises: the Toronto Maple Leafs on Sportsnet Ontario (split with TSN4), the Calgary Flames and Edmonton Oilers on Sportsnet West, and the Vancouver Canucks on Sportsnet Pacific. The Montreal Canadiens, Ottawa Senators, and Winnipeg Jets have regional television deals with TSN, and the Buffalo Sabres' Canadian regional rights are held by TSN parent company Bell Canada.

The NHL refused to allow players to compete at the 2018 Winter Olympics ice hockey tournament. Initially, in response to the NHL's decision, NBC elected not to air any NHL games during the three-week period on either the NBC broadcast network or NBCSN. However, NBC later relented and added three Sunday afternoon games in February as a lead-in to the Winter Olympics.

Sportsnet did not give any on-air assignments to Bob Cole during the 2018 playoffs—an exclusion that caught the veteran commentator off-guard. Over the 2018 off-season, Paul Romanuk departed Sportsnet, while John Bartlett (who called regional Montreal Canadiens games with Sportsnet through the 2016–17 season, and for the 2017–18 season with TSN2) returned to Sportsnet to call national games and regional Toronto Maple Leafs games.

In 2018, while only two Canadian teams made the playoffs, they once again included the Maple Leafs, as well as the Winnipeg Jets—who ultimately advanced to the Western Conference final, but were defeated by the Vegas Golden Knights in their inaugural season. Sportsnet stated that the Jets' second-round series had an average of 2.2 million viewers.

=== 2019 ===
For the 2018–19 season, NBCSN announced that it would re-brand its Wednesday Night Rivalry broadcasts as Wednesday Night Hockey, with a larger focus on showcasing star players rather than league rivalries. With these changes, the network promoted that its schedule would feature a wider variety of teams, including games between Canadian teams. The October 24, 2018 game between the Toronto Maple Leafs and Winnipeg Jets marked the first time that NBC had ever originated its own telecast of a regular season game between Canadian opponents.

In March 2019, it was announced that Sportsnet had partnered with the Aboriginal Peoples Television Network (APTN) to simulcast the Montreal Canadiens/Carolina Hurricanes game on March 24 with commentary in the indigenous language of Plains Cree. It was the first-ever NHL broadcast in the language: Clarence Iron of Pinehouse, Saskatchewan's CFNK-FM (who is known locally for his radio broadcasts of indigenous teams in the language) served as the play-by-play announcer, while former NHL player John Chabot and Northern Cree member Earl Wood hosted the studio segments. Alongside the broadcast, Hometown Hockey also originated from the Enoch Cree Nation reserve outside of Edmonton.
