= Sunday Night Hockey =

- Also known as: Star Sunday
- Genre: NHL game telecasts
- Presented by: NHL on NBC commentators Kenny Albert; John Forslund; Joe Micheletti; Pierre McGuire; Brendan Burke; A. J. Mleczko; Liam McHugh; Kathryn Tappen; Keith Jones; Patrick Sharp; Anson Carter; Mike Babcock; Ryan Callahan; Dominic Moore
- Country of origin: United States
- Original language: English
- No. of seasons: 6
- No. of episodes: 65

Production
- Camera setup: Multi-camera
- Running time: 180 minutes or until game ends
- Production company: NBC Sports

Original release
- Network: NBCSN
- Release: January 10, 2016 – April 25, 2021

Related
- NHL on NBC; Rogers Hometown Hockey (Canadian counterpart)

Sunday Night Hockey was a weekly presentation of National Hockey League games that air on NBCSN on Sundays during the regular season. Sunday Night Hockey usually debuts during the second Sunday of January.

The package made its debut on January 10, 2016, featuring a game between the New Jersey Devils and the Minnesota Wild. Following the game, NBCSN premiered a weekly recap show, NHL Sunday Shootout, which is a summary of the previous week's NHL action.

During the 2016–17 NHL season, NBC Sports began to promote both the Game of the Week and Sunday Night Hockey broadcasts under the Star Sunday brand, focusing primarily on the NHL's star players. Star Sunday features extensive pre-game, in-game, and post-game coverage of each featured player. The first game under the new package featured the Wild visiting the Anaheim Ducks on January 5, 2017. The game's featured players were Minnesota's Ryan Suter and Anaheim's Ryan Kesler.

== Results ==
=== 2015–16 season ===
Date	Time	Away team	Score	Home team	Score
January 10, 2016	8 P.M.	New Jersey	2	Minnesota	1
January 17, 2016	7:30 P.M.	Philadelphia	2 (SO)	Detroit	1
February 14, 2016	7:30 P.M.	Philadelphia	1	New York Rangers	3
February 21, 2016	7 P.M.	Detroit	0	NY Rangers	1 (OT)
February 28, 2016	6:30 P.M.	Tampa Bay	4	Boston	1
February 28, 2016	9 P.M.	Los Angeles	2	Anaheim	4
March 6, 2016	8 P.M.	St. Louis	4	Minnesota	2
March 13, 2016	7:30 P.M.	Toronto	1	Detroit	0
March 20, 2016	6 P.M.	Washington	2	Pittsburgh	6
March 20, 2016	8:30 P.M.	Minnesota	3 (SO)	Chicago	2
March 27, 2016	7:30 P.M.	Pittsburgh	3 (OT)	New York Rangers	2
April 3, 2016	8 P.M.	St. Louis	5	Colorado	1
April 10, 2016	7 P.M.	Philadelphia	5	New York Islanders	2

=== 2016–17 season ===
During the season, the Star Sunday brand made its debut.

Date	Time	Away team	Score	Home team	Score
January 8, 2017* (Note: NBC selected Ryan Suter and Ryan Kesler as featured Star Sunday players for the game.)	8 P.M.	Minnesota	2	Anaheim	1
January 15, 2017* (Note: NBC selected Zach Parise and Patrick Kane as featured Star Sunday players for the game.)	7 P.M.	Minnesota	3	Chicago	2
February 12, 2017* (Note: NBC selected Shea Weber and Brad Marchand as featured Star Sunday players for the game.)	7:30 P.M.	Montréal	0	Boston	4
February 19, 2017	6 P.M.	Chicago	5	Buffalo	1
February 19, 2017	8:30 P.M.	Boston	2	San Jose	1
February 26, 2017* (Note: NBC selected Vladimir Tarasenko and Jonathan Toews as featured Star Sunday players for the game.)	7:30 P.M.	St. Louis	2	Chicago	4
March 5, 2017* (Note: NBC selected Alex Pietrangelo and Nathan MacKinnon as featured Star Sunday players for the game.)	8 P.M.	St. Louis	3	Colorado	0
March 12, 2017* (Note: NBC selected J. T. Miller and Tomáš Tatar as featured Star Sunday players for the game.)	7 P.M.	New York Rangers	4	Detroit	1
March 26, 2017* (Note: NBC selected Wayne Simmonds and Sidney Crosby as featured Star Sunday players for the game.)	7 P.M.	Philadelphia	6	Pittsburgh	2
April 2, 2017* (Note: NBC selected Claude Giroux and Rick Nash as featured Star Sunday players for the game.)	7:30 P.M.	Philadelphia	3	New York Rangers	4

(*) Designated as a Star Sunday game.

=== 2017–18 season ===
NBC resumed its special Star Sunday presentations on March 11, 2018, both as part of the Game of the Week and Sunday Night Hockey package.

Date	Time	Away team	Score	Home team	Score
January 7, 2018	7:30 P.M.	Boston	4	Pittsburgh	5 (OT)
January 14, 2018	7:30 P.M.	New York Rangers	2	Pittsburgh	5
March 4, 2018	7 P.M.	Detroit	1	Minnesota	4
March 11, 2018* (Note: NBC selected Tyler Seguin and Evgeni Malkin as featured Star Sunday players for the game.)	7:30 P.M.	Dallas	1	Pittsburgh	3
March 18, 2018* (Note: NBC selected Alex Pietrangelo and Jonathan Toews as featured Star Sunday players for the game.)	7:30 P.M.	St. Louis	5	Chicago	4 (OT)
March 25, 2018* (Note: NBC selected Eric Staal and Brad Marchand as featured Star Sunday players for the game.)	7:30 P.M.	Boston	2 (OT)	Minnesota	1
April 1, 2018* (Note: NBC selected Alexander Ovechkin and Sidney Crosby as featured Star Sunday players for the game.)	7:30 P.M.	Washington	3	Pittsburgh	1

(*) Designated as a Star Sunday game.

=== 2018–19 season ===
Star Sunday returned on February 3, 2019, both as part of the Game of the Week and Sunday Night Hockey package. This will mark the first season of Star Sunday to have its presenting sponsor; AT&T was the first presenting sponsor and they branded themselves as Star Sunday presented by AT&T. Additionally, Brian Boucher and Pierre McGuire rotated on the lead broadcast team with Mike Emrick and Eddie Olczyk, with the other being reassigned to work with NBC's other broadcast teams.

Date	Time	Away team	Score	Home team	Score
January 6, 2019	8 P.M.	Chicago	5	Pittsburgh	3
February 10, 2019* (Note: NBC selected Auston Matthews and Henrik Lundqvist as featured Star Sunday players for the game.)	7 P.M.	Toronto	1	New York Rangers	4
February 17, 2019	6 P.M.	Philadelphia	3	Detroit	1
February 24, 2019* (Note: NBC selected Ryan O'Reilly and Zach Parise as featured Star Sunday players for the game.)	7 P.M.	St. Louis	1	Minnesota	2 (OT)
March 3, 2019* (Note: NBC selected Filip Forsberg and Ryan Suter as featured Star Sunday players for the game.)	7:30 P.M.	Nashville	3	Minnesota	2 (SO)
March 10, 2019* (Note: NBC selected Brad Marchand and Evgeni Malkin as featured Star Sunday players for the Bruins–Penguins game, as well as Drew Doughty and Ryan Getzlaf for the Kings–Ducks game.)	7:30 P.M.	Boston	2	Pittsburgh	4
March 10, 2019*	10 P.M.	Los Angeles	3	Anaheim	2
March 17, 2019* (Note: NBC selected Claude Giroux and Sidney Crosby as featured Star Sunday players for the Flyers–Penguins game, as well as Connor McDavid and Marc-André Fleury for the Oilers–Golden Knights game.)	7:30 P.M.	Philadelphia	2	Pittsburgh	1 (OT)
March 17, 2019*	10 P.M.	Edmonton	3	Vegas	6
March 24, 2019* (Note: NBC selected Nathan MacKinnon and Patrick Kane as featured Star Sunday players for the game.)	8 P.M.	Colorado	1	Chicago	2 (OT)
March 31, 2019* (Note: NBC selected David Pastrnak and Dylan Larkin as featured Star Sunday players for the game.)	7:30 P.M.	Boston	3	Detroit	6

(*) Designated as a Star Sunday game.

=== 2019–20 season ===
As part of the two-season arrangement, Brian Boucher replaced Pierre McGuire on the lead broadcast team with Mike Emrick and Eddie Olczyk. McGuire will be reassigned to work with NBC's other broadcast teams.

Date	Time	Away team	Score	Home team	Score
January 5, 2020	7:30 P.M.	Detroit	2	Chicago	4
January 5, 2020	10 P.M.	Nashville	4	Anaheim	5 (SO)
February 9, 2020	7:30 P.M.	Colorado	3	Minnesota	2
February 16, 2020	6 P.M.	St. Louis	1	Nashville	2
February 23, 2020	7:30 P.M.	St. Louis	4	Minnesota	1
February 23, 2020	10 P.M.	Vegas	6	Anaheim	5 (OT)
March 1, 2020	8 P.M.	Washington	4	Minnesota	3
March 1, 2020	10:30 P.M.	Los Angeles	4	Vegas	1
March 8, 2020	7:30 P.M.	St. Louis	2	Chicago	0
March 8, 2020	10 P.M.	Colorado	4	San Jose	3

=== 2020–21 season ===
Due to the COVID-19 pandemic, the start of the 2020–21 NHL season has been delayed to January 13, 2021, and all teams will play a 56-game division-only schedule with the NHL temporairally realigning divisions to minimize travel as much as possible, with all seven Canadian teams playing one division due to COVID-19 cross-border travel restrictions imposed by the Government of Canada.

15 different teams from all four divisions will be featured on 10 Sunday Night Hockey matchups. All four teams who competed in the conference finals of the 2020 Stanley Cup playoffs will be featured on Sunday Night Hockey. Six out of the 10 Sunday Night Hockey matchups will feature a traditional Western Conference team. Unlike in previous years, a few Sunday Night Hockey games will not be exclusive and are blacked out in favor of local broadcasters.

Date	Time	Away team	Score	Home team	Score
February 14, 2021	7 P.M.	Colorado	0	Vegas	1
February 21, 2021	7 P.M. (Note: Originally scheduled at 3 P.M. on NBC, but was rescheduled due to weather.)	Philadelphia	3	Boston	7
February 28, 2021	7 P.M.	Detroit	2	Chicago	7
March 7, 2021	2:30 P.M. (Note: Blacked out in the Chicago market. Game was televised locally on NBC Sports Chicago.)	Tampa Bay	6	Chicago	3
March 7, 2021	5 P.M. (Note: Blacked out in the Boston market. Game was televised locally on New England Sports Network.)	New Jersey	1	Boston	0
March 7, 2021	7:30 P.M. (Note: Blacked out in the New York metropolitan area and Pittsburgh markets. Game was televised locally on MSG Network and AT&T SportsNet Pittsburgh.)	New York Rangers	1	Pittsburgh	5
March 14, 2021	5:30 P.M. (Note: Originally scheduled at 7 P.M., but was rescheduled due to weather.)	Los Angeles	1	Colorado	4
March 21, 2021	6 P.M. (Note: Blacked out in the Los Angeles market. Game was televised locally on Fox Sports West.)	Vegas	1	Los Angeles	3
March 28, 2021	3 P.M. (Note: Blacked out in the Detroit market. Game was televised locally on Fox Sports Detroit.)	Columbus	1	Detroit	4
March 28, 2021	5:30 P.M. (Note: Blacked out in the Boston market. Game was televised locally on New England Sports Network.)	New Jersey	1	Boston	0
March 28, 2021	8 P.M. (Note: Blacked out in the Chicago market. Game was televised locally on NBC Sports Chicago.)	Nashville	3	Chicago	2
April 4, 2021	7 P.M. (Note: Blacked out in the North and South Carolina markets. Game was televised locally on Bally Sports South.)	Dallas	0	Carolina	1
April 18, 2021	6:30 P.M. (Note: Originally scheduled as the first game of a doubleheader; however the Los Angeles–Colorado game was postponed due to COVID-19 protocols.)	New York Islanders	1	Philadelphia	0 (OT)
April 25, 2021	7 P.M.	Columbus	3	Tampa Bay	4 (OT)

== Ratings ==
During its inaugural season, Sunday Night Hockey averaged 491,000 viewers over 13 games, up 28% from Sunday Night games during the 2014–15 NHL season over the same number of games (384,000). NBCSN's ten-most watched games of the 2015–16 season were either Wednesday Night Rivalry or Sunday Night Hockey games.
