= 2014 NHL Stadium Series =

Outdoor National Hockey League game

Dodger Stadium
- Game one: Anaheim Ducks at Los Angeles Kings

Yankee Stadium
- Game two: New York Rangers at New Jersey Devils
- Game three: New York Rangers at New York Islanders

Soldier Field
- Game four: Pittsburgh Penguins at Chicago Blackhawks
- Total attendance: 217,152

The 2014 NHL Stadium Series (branded the 2014 Coors Light NHL Stadium Series) was a series of four outdoor regular season National Hockey League (NHL) games played during the 2013–14 season. It was the inaugural season of the NHL Stadium Series and these events are distinct from the NHL Winter Classic and NHL Heritage Classic outdoor games. The Stadium Series games consisted of: the Los Angeles Kings against the Anaheim Ducks at Dodger Stadium in Los Angeles on January 25, 2014; the New Jersey Devils against the New York Rangers at Yankee Stadium in the Bronx of New York City on January 26; the New York Islanders against the Rangers at Yankee Stadium on January 29; and the Pittsburgh Penguins against the Chicago Blackhawks at Soldier Field in Chicago on March 1, 2014.

The Stadium Series was staged in between the season's two other outdoor games: the Detroit Red Wings hosting the Toronto Maple Leafs in the 2014 NHL Winter Classic at Michigan Stadium in Ann Arbor, Michigan, on January 1, 2014; and the Vancouver Canucks hosting the Ottawa Senators in the 2014 Heritage Classic at BC Place in Vancouver on March 2. After the conclusion of their two Stadium Series games, the Rangers had played four outdoor games, the most of any NHL team, having previously participated in the 2012 NHL Winter Classic and the 1991 exhibition game in Las Vegas.

== Dodger Stadium (January 25) ==
NHL Stadium Series: Los Angeles
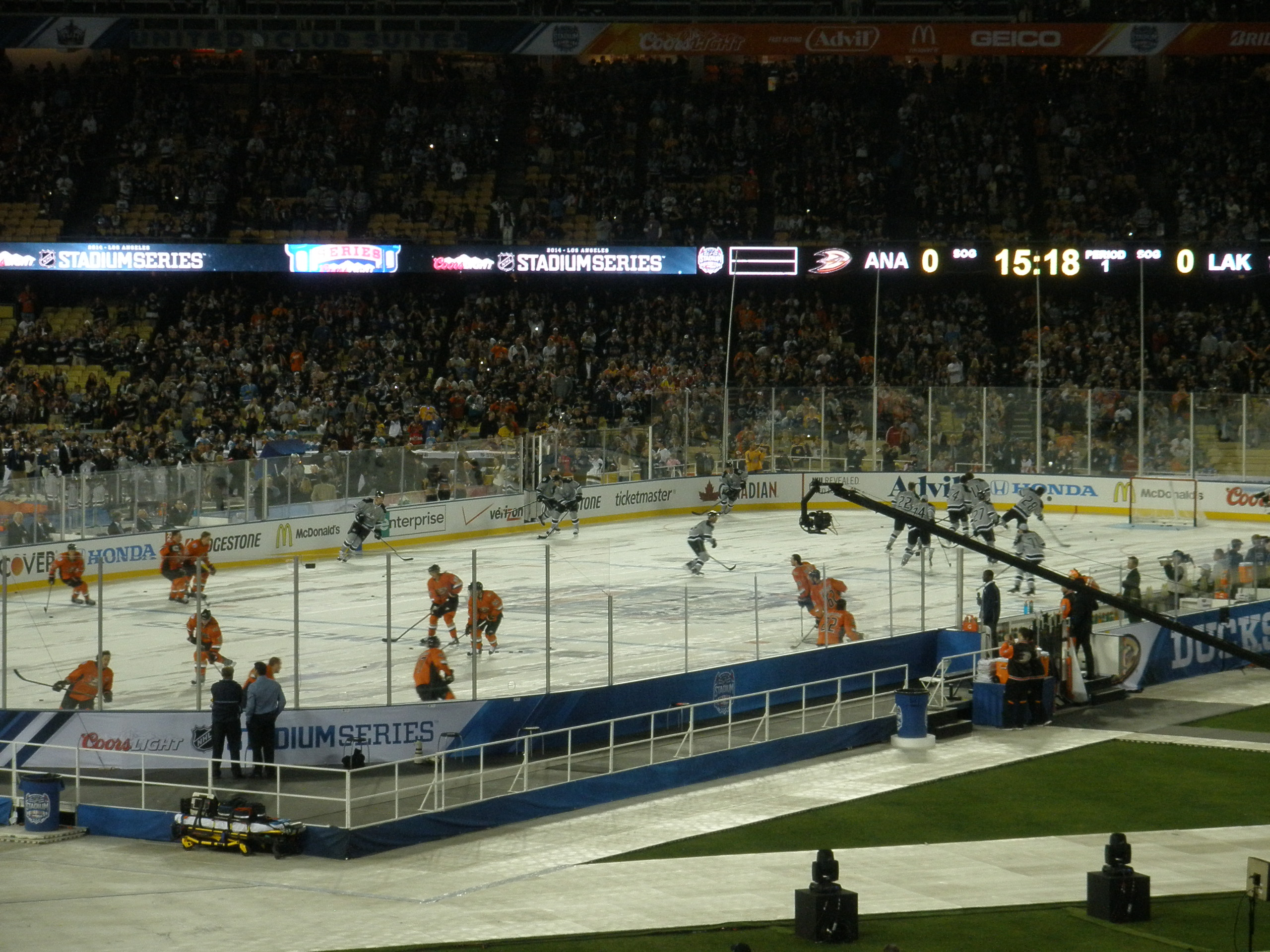
	1	2	3	Total
Anaheim Ducks	2	0	1	3
Los Angeles Kings	0	0	0	0
- Date: January 25, 2014
- Venue: Dodger Stadium
- City: Los Angeles
- Attendance: 54,099

The first game of the series at Dodger Stadium featured performances by Kiss and Five for Fighting before the game and between the periods, and the opening ceremonies included Vin Scully and Wayne Gretzky.

The Anaheim Ducks shut-out the Los Angeles Kings in the inaugural Stadium Series game, 3–0, with Jonas Hiller making 36 saves.

Scoring summary
Period	Team	Goal	Assist(s)	Time	Score
1st	ANA	Corey Perry (28)	Ryan Getzlaf (35)	02:45	1–0 ANA
1st	ANA	Matt Beleskey (5)	Nick Bonino (24) and Teemu Selanne (11)	08:12	2–0 ANA
2nd	None				
3rd	ANA	Andrew Cogliano (17) – en	Kyle Palmieri (12)	18:31	3–0 ANA

Number in parentheses represents the player's total in goals or assists to that point of the season

Penalty summary
Period	Team	Player	Penalty	Time	PIM
1st	LAK	Colin Fraser	Roughing	13:08	2:00
1st	ANA	Patrick Maroon	Roughing	13:08	2:00
1st	ANA	Bryan Allen	Holding	15:49	2:00
2nd	ANA	Tim Jackman	Fighting – major	02:39	5:00
2nd	LAK	Kyle Clifford	Fighting – major	02:39	5:00
2nd	LAK	Slava Voynov	Delay of game – puck over glass	03:09	2:00
2nd	ANA	Hampus Lindholm	Interference	06:38	2:00
2nd	LAK	Jeff Carter	High-sticking	07:52	2:00
2nd	LAK	Drew Doughty	Tripping	14:46	2:00
2nd	ANA	Kyle Palmieri	Hooking	19:23	2:00
3rd	ANA	Kyle Palmieri	Goaltender interference	01:43	2:00

Shots by period
Team	1	2	3	Total
Anaheim	7	6	8	21
Los Angeles	20	6	10	36

Power play opportunities
Team	Goals/Opportunities
Anaheim	0/3
Los Angeles	0/4

Three star selections
	Team	Player	Statistics
1st	ANA	Jonas Hiller	36 saves; 1.000 SV%
2nd	LAK	Anze Kopitar	1 hit
3rd	ANA	Matt Beleskey	1 goal

=== Team rosters ===
Anaheim Ducks
#		Player	Position
1	(Switzerland)	Jonas Hiller	G
4	(United States)	Cam Fowler	D
6	(United States)	Ben Lovejoy	D
7	(Canada)	Andrew Cogliano	C
8	(Finland)	Teemu Selanne (A)	RW
10	(Canada)	Corey Perry	RW
11	(Finland)	Saku Koivu (A)	C
13	(United States)	Nick Bonino	C
15	(Canada)	Ryan Getzlaf (C)	C
17	(Canada)	Dustin Penner	LW
18	(United States)	Tim Jackman	RW
21	(United States)	Kyle Palmieri	RW
23	(Canada)	Francois Beauchemin	D
28	(Canada)	Mark Fistric	D
31	(Denmark)	Frederik Andersen	G
34	(Canada)	Daniel Winnik	LW
39	(Canada)	Matt Beleskey	LW
47	(Sweden)	Hampus Lindholm	D
55	(Canada)	Bryan Allen	D
62	(United States)	Patrick Maroon	LW
Head coach: (Canada) Bruce Boudreau

Los Angeles Kings
#		Player	Position
6	(Canada)	Jake Muzzin	D
8	(Canada)	Drew Doughty	D
10	(Canada)	Mike Richards	C
11	(Slovenia)	Anze Kopitar (A)	C
13	(Canada)	Kyle Clifford	LW
14	(Canada)	Justin Williams	RW
21	(Canada)	Matt Frattin	RW
22	(United States)	Trevor Lewis	C
23	(United States)	Dustin Brown (C)	RW
24	(Canada)	Colin Fraser	C
26	(Russia)	Slava Voynov	D
27	(United States)	Alec Martinez	D
28	(Canada)	Jarret Stoll	C
31	(Canada)	Martin Jones	G
32	(United States)	Jonathan Quick	G
33	(Canada)	Willie Mitchell	D
44	(Canada)	Robyn Regehr	D
71	(Canada)	Jordan Nolan	RW
74	(Canada)	Dwight King	LW
77	(Canada)	Jeff Carter	C
Head coach: (Canada) Darryl Sutter

Frederik Andersen and Martin Jones dressed as the back-up goaltenders. Neither entered the game.

== Yankee Stadium games ==
The second and third Stadium Series games were played at Yankee Stadium, when the Rangers played the Devils and the Islanders on January 26 and 29, 2014, respectively. The Rangers were considered the away team for both games; their home arena, Madison Square Garden, receives tax-exempt status, but only if the Rangers do not "cease playing" home games at MSG, generally interpreted as playing any "home" game outside of MSG.

=== January 26 ===
The second game of the 2014 NHL Stadium Series took place on January 26, 2014, and was part one of a doubleheader at Yankee Stadium in New York City, featuring the New Jersey Devils and the New York Rangers. This was the NHL's first outdoor game in New York City. The Devils were the designated home team for this game.

The game was originally supposed to start at 12:30 PM, but it was delayed for over an hour due to sun glare and it started at 1:38 PM.

The New York Rangers won 7–3 behind Henrik Lundqvist's 19 saves. After being down 3–2 in the first period, the Rangers stormed back and romped over the Devils by scoring four unanswered goals in the second period and adding another goal by Derek Stepan on a penalty shot in the third period. Mats Zuccarello netted two goals for the Rangers. Also scoring for the Rangers included Rick Nash, Marc Staal and Carl Hagelin. Patrik Elias scored two goals for the Devils and Travis Zajac scored one goal.

NHL Stadium Series: New York
	1	2	3	Total
New York Rangers	2	4	1	7
New Jersey Devils	3	0	0	3
- Date: January 26, 2014
- Venue: Yankee Stadium
- City: New York City
- Attendance: 50,105

Scoring summary
Period	Team	Goal	Assist(s)	Time	Score
1st	NJ	Patrik Elias (8)	Ryane Clowe (10)	05:36	1–0 NJ
1st	NYR	Dominic Moore (4)	Anton Stralman (5) and Brian Boyle (8)	09:07	1–1
1st	NJ	Patrik Elias (9) – pp	Jaromir Jagr (27) and Marek Zidlicky (20)	11:00	2–1 NJ
1st	NJ	Travis Zajac (8)	Jaromir Jagr (28) and Mark Fayne (3)	16:07	3–1 NJ
1st	NYR	Marc Staal (3)	Dominic Moore (6)	16:59	3–2 NJ
2nd	NYR	Mats Zuccarello (14)	John Moore (8) and Derick Brassard (19)	02:48	3–3
2nd	NYR	Mats Zuccarello (15)	Derick Brassard (20) and Benoit Pouliot (11)	12:44	4–3 NYR
2nd	NYR	Carl Hagelin (12)	Ryan Callahan (11) and Anton Stralman (6)	13:53	5–3 NYR
2nd	NYR	Rick Nash (18)	Derek Stepan (25) and Marc Staal (5)	19:31	6–3 NYR
3rd	NYR	Derek Stepan (10) – ps	Unassisted	10:06	7–3 NYR

Number in parentheses represents the player's total in goals or assists to that point of the season

Penalty summary
Period	Team	Player	Penalty	Time	PIM
1st	NYR	Brian Boyle	Roughing	02:01	2:00
1st	NJ	Patrik Elias	Tripping	02:20	2:00
1st	NYR	Derick Brassard	Tripping	10:38	2:00
1st	NJ	Mark Fayne	Holding	19:11	2:00
2nd	NJ	Marek Zidlicky	Cross-checking	06:14	2:00
3rd	NJ	Travis Zajac	Holding	10:06	Penalty shot

Shots by period
Team	1	2	3	Total
NY Rangers	10	11	5	26
New Jersey	10	7	5	22

Power play opportunities
Team	Goals/Opportunities
NY Rangers	0/3
New Jersey	1/2

Three star selections
	Team	Player	Statistics
1st	NYR	Mats Zuccarello	2 goals
2nd	NJD	Patrik Elias	2 goals
3rd	NYR	Anton Stralman	2 assists

==== Team rosters ====
New York Rangers
#		Player	Position
5	(Canada)	Dan Girardi	D
6	(Sweden)	Anton Stralman	D
8	(Canada)	Kevin Klein	D
13	(Canada)	Daniel Carcillo	LW
16	(Canada)	Derick Brassard	C
17	(United States)	John Moore	D
18	(Canada)	Marc Staal (A)	D
19	(Canada)	Brad Richards (A)	C
20	(United States)	Chris Kreider	LW
21	(United States)	Derek Stepan	C
22	(United States)	Brian Boyle	C
24	(United States)	Ryan Callahan (C)	RW
27	(United States)	Ryan McDonagh	D
28	(Canada)	Dominic Moore	C
30	(Sweden)	Henrik Lundqvist	G
33	(Canada)	Cam Talbot	G
36	(Norway)	Mats Zuccarello	C
61	(Canada)	Rick Nash	LW
62	(Sweden)	Carl Hagelin	LW
67	(Canada)	Benoit Pouliot	LW
Head coach: (Canada) Alain Vigneault

New Jersey Devils
#		Player	Position
2	(Czech Republic)	Marek Zidlicky	D
6	(United States)	Andy Greene	D
7	(United States)	Mark Fayne	D
8	(Lithuania)	Dainius Zubrus	C
11	(United States)	Stephen Gionta	C
12	(Switzerland)	Damien Brunner	C
14	(Canada)	Adam Henrique	C
16	(Sweden)	Jacob Josefson	C
17	(Canada)	Michael Ryder	RW
18	(Canada)	Steve Bernier	RW
19	(Canada)	Travis Zajac (A)	C
20	(United States)	Ryan Carter	C
22	(Canada)	Eric Gelinas	D
24	(Canada)	Bryce Salvador (C)	D
26	(Czech Republic)	Patrik Elias (A)	L
28	(Russia)	Anton Volchenkov	D
29	(Canada)	Ryane Clowe	L
30	(Canada)	Martin Brodeur	G
35	(United States)	Cory Schneider	G
68	(Czech Republic)	Jaromir Jagr	RW
Head coach: (Canada) Peter DeBoer

=== January 29 ===
NHL Stadium Series: New York
	1	2	3	Total
New York Rangers	0	1	1	2
New York Islanders	0	1	0	1
- Date: January 29, 2014
- Venue: Yankee Stadium
- City: New York City
- Attendance: 50,027

The third game of the 2014 NHL Stadium Series took place on January 29, 2014, and was the second part of a doubleheader at Yankee Stadium in New York City, featuring the New York Islanders and the New York Rangers, who played their second straight game outdoors. The Islanders were the designated home team for this game.

The Rangers won the game 2–1 after overcoming a 1–0 deficit in the second period. Henrik Lundqvist made 30 saves in the game, earning the victory for the Rangers. Benoit Pouliot and Daniel Carcillo scored for the Rangers, while Brock Nelson scored the Islanders' lone goal.

Scoring summary
Period	Team	Goal	Assist(s)	Time	Score
1st	None				
2nd	NYI	Brock Nelson (10)	Matt Donovan (6) and Cal Clutterbuck (4)	18:33	1–0 NYI
2nd	NYR	Benoit Pouliot (9)	Derick Brassard (21) and Mats Zuccarello (23)	19:13	1–1 TIE
3rd	NYR	Daniel Carcillo (3)	Dominic Moore (7) and Brian Boyle (9)	04:36	2–1 NYR

Number in parentheses represents the player's total in goals or assists to that point of the season

Penalty summary
Period	Team	Player	Penalty	Time	PIM
1st	NYR	Brad Richards	Hooking	03:24	2:00
1st	NYR	Mats Zuccarello	Interference	17:57	2:00
2nd	NYI	Kyle Okposo	Hooking	10:11	2:00
2nd	NYR	Rick Nash	Diving	10:11	2:00
2nd	NYR	Daniel Carcillo	Roughing	12:59	2:00
3rd	NYI	Thomas Vanek	Hooking	00:23	2:00
3rd	NYR	Brian Boyle	Cross-checking	19:57	2:00

Shots by period
Team	1	2	3	Total
NY Rangers	6	14	14	34
NY Islanders	10	15	6	31

Power play opportunities
Team	Goals/Opportunities
NY Rangers	0/1
NY Islanders	0/4

Three star selections
	Team	Player	Statistics
1st	NYR	Henrik Lundqvist	30 saves
2nd	NYI	Evgeni Nabokov	32 saves
3rd	NYR	Dan Girardi	2 hits and 4 blocks, +1 rating

==== Team rosters ====
New York Rangers
#		Player	Position
5	(Canada)	Dan Girardi	D
6	(Sweden)	Anton Stralman	D
8	(Canada)	Kevin Klein	D
13	(Canada)	Daniel Carcillo	LW
16	(Canada)	Derick Brassard	C
17	(United States)	John Moore	D
18	(Canada)	Marc Staal (A)	D
19	(Canada)	Brad Richards (A)	C
20	(United States)	Chris Kreider	LW
21	(United States)	Derek Stepan	C
22	(United States)	Brian Boyle	C
24	(United States)	Ryan Callahan (C)	RW
27	(United States)	Ryan McDonagh	D
28	(Canada)	Dominic Moore	C
30	(Sweden)	Henrik Lundqvist	G
33	(Canada)	Cam Talbot	G
36	(Norway)	Mats Zuccarello	C
61	(Canada)	Rick Nash	LW
62	(Sweden)	Carl Hagelin	LW
67	(Canada)	Benoit Pouliot	LW
Head coach: (Canada) Alain Vigneault

New York Islanders
#		Player	Position
11	(Slovakia)	Lubomir Visnovsky	D
12	(Canada)	Josh Bailey	C
13	(United States)	Colin McDonald	RW
14	(Canada)	Thomas Hickey	D
15	(Canada)	Cal Clutterbuck	RW
16	(Denmark)	Peter Regin	C
17	(Canada)	Matt Martin	LW
20	(Russia)	Evgeni Nabokov	G
21	(United States)	Kyle Okposo (A)	RW
26	(Austria)	Thomas Vanek	LW
29	(United States)	Brock Nelson	C
37	(United States)	Brian Strait	D
40	(Austria)	Michael Grabner	RW
44	(Canada)	Calvin de Haan	D
46	(United States)	Matt Donovan	D
47	(Canada)	Andrew MacDonald (A)	D
51	(Denmark)	Frans Nielsen	C
53	(Canada)	Casey Cizikas	C
60	(Canada)	Kevin Poulin	G
91	(Canada)	John Tavares (C)	C
Head coach: (United States) Jack Capuano

== Soldier Field (March 1) ==
NHL Stadium Series: Chicago
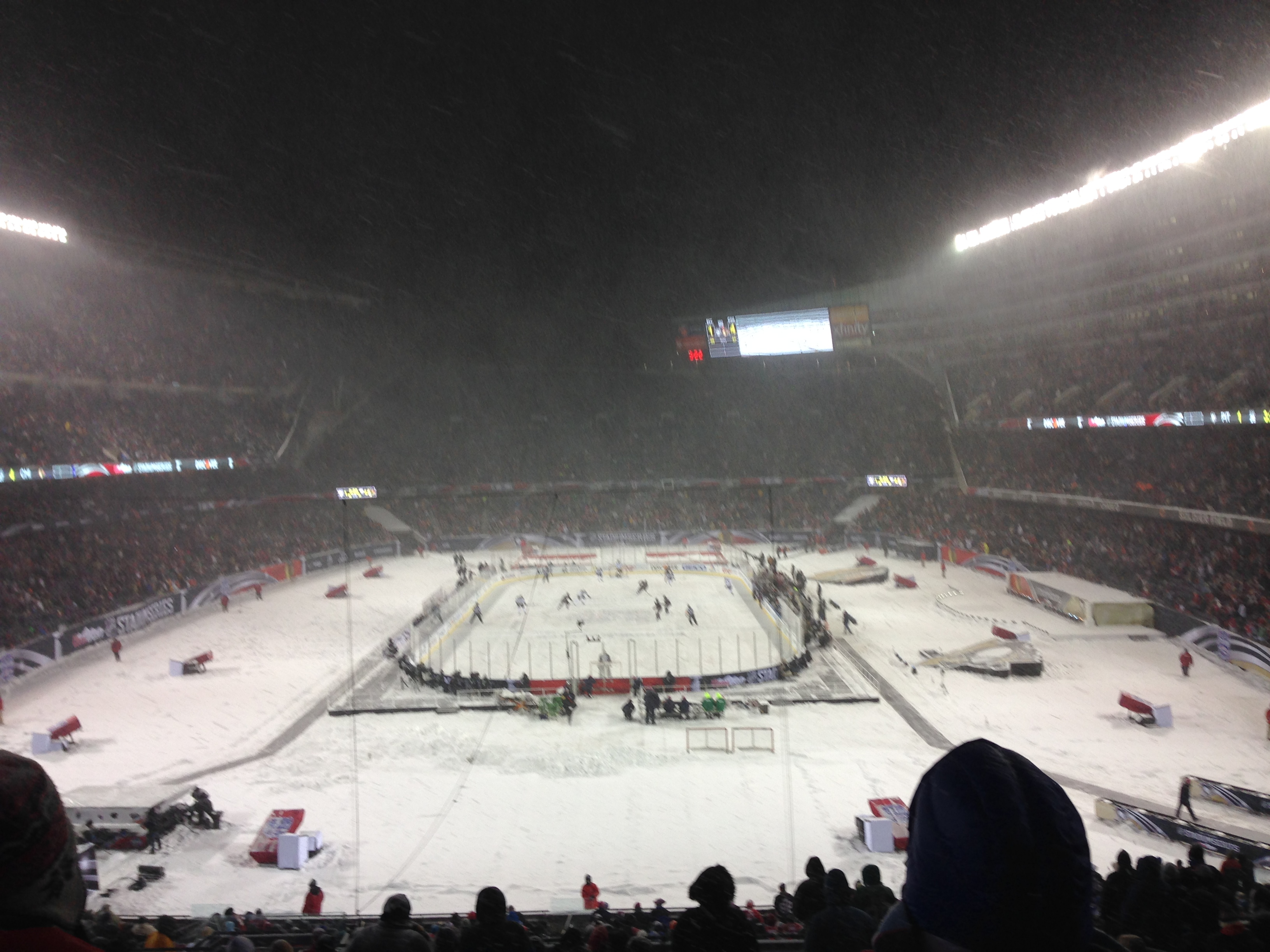
	1	2	3	Total
Pittsburgh Penguins	0	0	1	1
Chicago Blackhawks	1	2	2	5
- Date: March 1, 2014
- Venue: Soldier Field
- City: Chicago
- Attendance: 62,921

The fourth and final game of the 2014 NHL Stadium Series took place on March 1, 2014, at Soldier Field in Chicago, featuring the Pittsburgh Penguins and the Chicago Blackhawks. The game concluded Hockey Weekend Across America.

Chicago defeated Pittsburgh 5–1, with Corey Crawford making 31 saves. Jonathan Toews scored two goals for Chicago. Chicago's other three goals were scored by Patrick Sharp, Kris Versteeg and Bryan Bickell. James Neal scored Pittsburgh's lone goal.

Scoring summary
Period	Team	Goal	Assist(s)	Time	Score
1st	CHI	Patrick Sharp (29)	Jonathan Toews (37) and Nick Leddy (18)	15:35	1–0 CHI
2nd	CHI	Jonathan Toews (20)	Unassisted	10:48	2–0 CHI
2nd	CHI	Kris Versteeg (10)	Patrick Kane (37) and Michal Handzus (8)	16:43	3–0 CHI
3rd	PIT	James Neal (22)	Unassisted	06:21	3–1 CHI
3rd	CHI	Bryan Bickell (9)	Brandon Saad (23) and Michal Rozsival (6)	13:57	4–1 CHI
3rd	CHI	Jonathan Toews (21)	Patrick Sharp (31)	17:52	5–1 CHI

Number in parentheses represents the player's total in goals or assists to that point of the season

Penalty summary
Period	Team	Player	Penalty	Time	PIM
1st	PIT	Simon Despres	Tripping	04:12	2:00
1st	PIT	Tanner Glass	Boarding	11:48	2:00
1st	CHI	Johnny Oduya	Holding	17:46	2:00
2nd	PIT	Simon Despres	High-sticking	02:03	2:00
2nd	CHI	Duncan Keith	Delay of game	05:56	2:00
2nd	PIT	Chris Kunitz	Roughing	06:50	2:00
2nd	CHI	Johnny Oduya	Interference	07:09	2:00
2nd	CHI	Duncan Keith	High-sticking	11:38	2:00
2nd	CHI	Michal Rozsival	Tripping	18:42	2:00
3rd	CHI	Marcus Kruger	Delay of the game	10:29	2:00

Shots by period
Team	1	2	3	Total
Pittsburgh	5	13	14	32
Chicago	14	17	9	40

Power play opportunities
Team	Goals/Opportunities
Pittsburgh	0/6
Chicago	0/3

Three star selections
	Team	Player	Statistics
1st	CHI	Jonathan Toews	2 goals, 1 assist
2nd	CHI	Patrick Sharp	1 goal, 1 assist
3rd	CHI	Patrick Kane	1 assist

=== Team rosters ===
Pittsburgh Penguins
#		Player	Position
2	(United States)	Matt Niskanen	D
3	(Finland)	Olli Maatta	D
4	(United States)	Rob Scuderi	D
5	(Canada)	Deryk Engelland	D
14	(Canada)	Chris Kunitz	LW
15	(Canada)	Tanner Glass	LW
16	(Canada)	Brandon Sutter	C
17	(Canada)	Taylor Pyatt	LW
18	(Canada)	James Neal	LW
27	(Canada)	Craig Adams	RW
29	(Canada)	Marc-Andre Fleury	G
36	(Finland)	Jussi Jokinen	LW
37	(United States)	Jeff Zatkoff	G
41	(Canada)	Robert Bortuzzo	D
44	(United States)	Brooks Orpik (A)	D
46	(United States)	Joe Vitale	C
47	(Canada)	Simon Despres	D
49	(United States)	Brian Gibbons	RW
71	(Russia)	Evgeni Malkin (A)	C
87	(Canada)	Sidney Crosby (C)	C
Head coach: (United States) Dan Bylsma

Chicago Blackhawks
#		Player	Position
2	(Canada)	Duncan Keith (A)	D
4	(Sweden)	Niklas Hjalmarsson	D
7	(Canada)	Brent Seabrook	D
8	(United States)	Nick Leddy	D
10	(Canada)	Patrick Sharp (A)	RW
16	(Sweden)	Marcus Kruger	C
19	(Canada)	Jonathan Toews (C)	C
20	(United States)	Brandon Saad	LW
23	(Canada)	Kris Versteeg	RW
26	(Slovakia)	Michal Handzus	C
27	(Sweden)	Johnny Oduya	D
28	(United States)	Ben Smith	RW
29	(Canada)	Bryan Bickell	RW
31	(Finland)	Antti Raanta	G
32	(Czech Republic)	Michal Rozsival	D
50	(Canada)	Corey Crawford	G
52	(United States)	Brandon Bollig	LW
65	(Canada)	Andrew Shaw	C
81	(Slovakia)	Marian Hossa	RW
88	(United States)	Patrick Kane	RW
Head coach: (Canada) Joel Quenneville

== Uniforms ==
Each team wore specially designed uniforms for the event, except for the Devils, who wore throwback uniforms in the team's original red and green color scheme. The Islanders unveiled their Stadium Series jersey on November 27, 2013. The Ducks and Kings jointly unveiled their Stadium Series jerseys on December 3. The Penguins unveiled their Stadium Series jersey on December 13. The Blackhawks and Rangers unveiled their Stadium Series jerseys on December 20. Penguins goalie Marc-André Fleury wore a Pittsburgh Steelers inspired goalie mask for the Penguins-Blackhawks game.

== Reality television series ==
The inaugural Stadium Series was the basis for a seven-part documentary called NHL Revealed: A Season Like No Other, premiering January 22, 2014, on the NBC Sports Network, and debuting in Canada the next day on CBC. The series was meant to differ from the pre-existing HBO 24/7: Road to the NHL Winter Classic with an added focus on star players' preparations for the 2014 Olympic Tournament in Sochi, Russia, of which NBCSN and CBC were major broadcasters.

== Television ratings ==
- Game 1 produced a 0.35 national rating and 622,000 viewers on the NBC Sports Network. While unimpressive, the numbers were considerably higher than average for NBCSN's ratings-challenged West Coast games. In Los Angeles, the game drew a 2.38 local rating, making NBCSN the highest rated cable channel (and second-highest rated overall) in the area during the broadcast. It was the network's best performance for an NHL regular season game in the market.
- Game 2 produced a 1.3 national rating and 2.091 million viewers for NBC, good enough to beat all non-regionalized indoor regular season broadcasts since the NHL's return to NBC in 2005, but not quite coming close to the viewership attracted by Winter Classic-branded outdoor games. The game drew a 5.1 local rating in New York, tying Game 1 of the 2012 Stanley Cup Final as the best performance in the market for the current incarnation of the NHL on NBC. The mark stood until the Rangers' strong Stanley Cup playoff run a few months later.
- Game 3 produced a 0.41 national rating and 682,000 viewers on NBCSN, rather ordinary numbers for the Wednesday Night Rivalry franchise. In New York, it drew a 3.58 local rating, the best performance in the market for an NHL regular season game on NBCSN.
- Game 4, played in prime time on NBC, produced a 2.1 national rating, the highest rating for a regular season game outside the Winter Classic since NBC took over the broadcast contract.

== See also ==
- NHL Winter Classic
- NHL Heritage Classic
- List of outdoor ice hockey games
