= Dave Jackson (ice hockey) =

Canadian former ice hockey referee

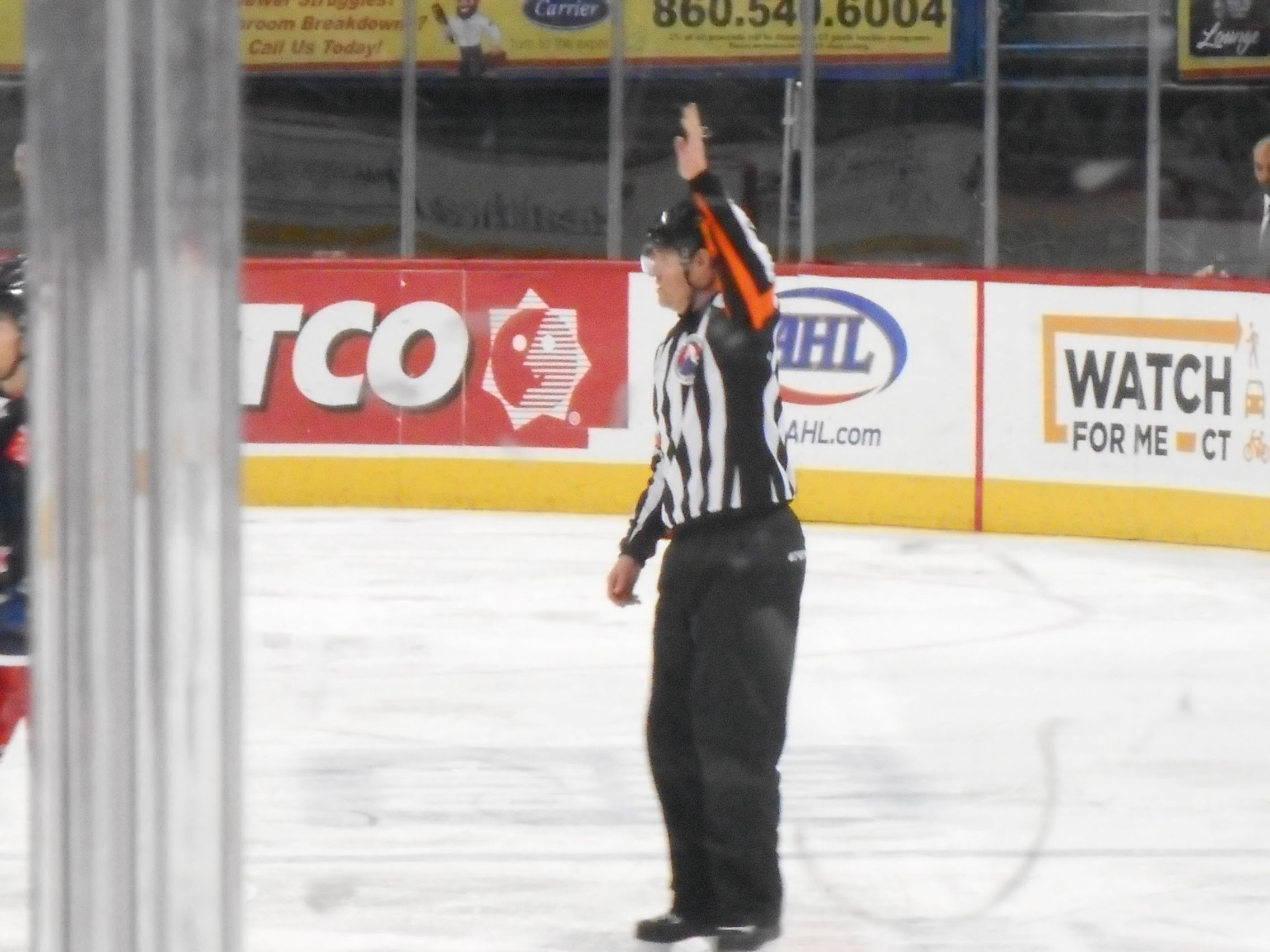
- Born: c. 1964 (age 61–62) Montreal, Quebec, Canada
- Position: referee
- Playing career: 1990–2018

Dave Jackson (born c. 1964) is a Canadian former ice hockey referee.

== Early life ==
Jackson was born in Montreal and raised in Pointe-Claire.

== Career ==
Jackson, who officiated the 1988 Memorial Cup, was signed by the National Hockey League (NHL) to a minor-league contract in 1989. He made his NHL debut on December 22, 1990, officiating a match-up between the New Jersey Devils and Quebec Nordiques.

Jackson was chosen to officiate men's ice hockey at the 2014 Winter Olympics held in Sochi, Russia. Jackson retired after officiating his final NHL game on March 29, 2018. He now works for ESPN as their lead rules analyst.
