= Blackhawks–Red Wings rivalry =

National Hockey League rivalry

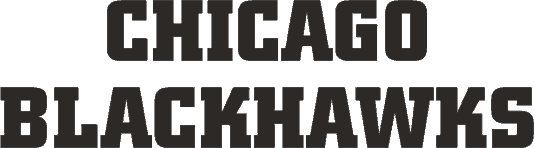
- Chicago Blackhawks Detroit Red Wings
- First meeting: November 24, 1926
- Latest meeting: October 29, 2026
- Next meeting: January 16, 2027

Statistics
- Total meetings: 839
- All-time series: 417–321–84–17 (DET)
- Regular season series: 379–278–84–17 (DET)
- Postseason results: 43–38 (CHI)
- Largest victory: DET 12–0 CHI; December 4, 1987
- Longest win streak: CHI W13
- Current win streak: DET W2

Postseason history
- 1934 Stanley Cup Final: Black Hawks won, 3–1; 1941 semifinals: Red Wings won, 2–0; 1944 semifinals: Black Hawks won, 4–1; 1961 Stanley Cup Final: Black Hawks won, 4–2; 1963 semifinals: Red Wings won, 4–2; 1964 semifinals: Red Wings won, 4–3; 1965 semifinals: Black Hawks won, 4–3; 1966 semifinals: Red Wings won, 4–2; 1970 quarterfinals: Black Hawks won, 4–0; 1985 division semifinals: Black Hawks won, 3–0; 1987 division semifinals: Red Wings won, 4–0; 1989 division semifinals: Blackhawks won, 4–2; 1992 division finals: Blackhawks won, 4–0; 1995 conference finals: Red Wings won, 4–1; 2009 conference finals: Red Wings won, 4–1; 2013 conference semifinals: Blackhawks won, 4–3

The Blackhawks–Red Wings rivalry is a National Hockey League (NHL) rivalry between the Chicago Blackhawks and Detroit Red Wings. Prior to the league-wide divisional realignment in 2013–14, it was the most intense rivalry in the Central Division during the post-lockout era. They represent the two largest metropolitan areas in the Midwest and are only separated by a 280-mile stretch of road, mostly covered by I-94. The clubs began playing each other in 1926–27, during the inaugural season for both franchises. These two clubs have faced each other in more regular season games than any other two teams in NHL history, only the Bruins–Canadiens rivalry exceeds them in total games played when Stanley Cup playoff games are included.

== History ==
The series began on November 24, 1926, when the NHL's two fledgling Midwest teams met for the first time. In the matchup, the Detroit Cougars (the club was eventually renamed Red Wings in 1932) earned a 1–0 victory against the Chicago Black Hawks (the team name was compounded to Blackhawks in 1986) at the Chicago Coliseum. In that game, Frank Frederickson of the Cougars scored the only goal with five minutes remaining in the third period, assisted by defenseman Hobie Kitchen, and goaltender Hap Holmes recorded the first shutout of his rookie season. It was the first win in Detroit franchise history, and the first loss in Chicago franchise history. Chicago's first Stanley Cup was later won against the Red Wings in 1934, when winger Mush March scored a goal in a double-overtime game, the first-ever Stanley Cup-winning overtime goal in the history of the NHL (though not the first in the history of the game, as Dan Bain accomplished this feat in January 1901 for the Winnipeg Victorias to bring them their second Stanley Cup).

During the 26-year period where the NHL had only the Original Six, both teams were controlled by the Norris family. Patriarch James Norris owned both franchises, until his death in 1952 split the rivals between his sons – the elder son, James was a co-owner of the Black Hawks along with Arthur Wirtz, while his brother Bruce inherited ownership of the Red Wings. In 1961, the Black Hawks led by Bobby Hull and Stan Mikita broke 23 years without a title by defeating Gordie Howe's Red Wings. On a visit to Olympia Stadium in Detroit in the 1960s, Hull was heckled by three Red Wings fans who eventually climbed the glass and dangled their arms over it before he hit them with his stick.

Starting in 1970–71, the Blackhawks realigned to the West Division while the Red Wings remained in the East. In 1981–82, they were reunited in the reconfigured Norris Division, which was renamed the Central Division in 1993 after the NHL revamped its alignment naming protocol. Seven of the ten largest hockey crowds in Chicago's United Center were for Blackhawks–Red Wings games.

In the 1985 Stanley Cup playoffs the two teams faced off in the division semifinals as the Blackhawks complete a three-game sweep. Two years later, in the 1987 Stanley Cup playoffs, the Red Wings got their revenge in a four-game sweep in the division semifinals. In 1989, the Blackhawks defeated the Red Wings in six games. In 1992, the Blackhawks again defeated the Red Wings with another sweep in four games en route to the 1992 Stanley Cup Final. In the 1995 Stanley Cup playoffs, the Red Wings defeated the Blackhawks in five games in the conference finals en route to the Stanley Cup Final.

Games between the Blackhawks and Red Wings were most notable for fighting. Bob Probert and Stu Grimson played for both teams and fought each other frequently. Bill Gadsby also played for both teams. Fans had much animosity for each other, with Blackhawks fans chanting "Detroit sucks!" in every game. Chicago native Chris Chelios was booed upon his return to the United Center as a Detroit player in 1999, and former Red Wing Marian Hossa earned the same response in 2009 at the Joe Louis Arena as a Blackhawk.

In the 2009 Stanley Cup playoffs, the two teams faced off in the Western Conference finals with Red Wings winning the series in five games en route to the 2009 Stanley Cup Final. In the 2013 Stanley Cup playoffs, the teams faced off against each other in the playoffs for the 16th time, and have played over 800 games against each other. The Blackhawks won the series 4–3 after trailing 3–1 en route to their fifth Stanley Cup.

As a result of the realignment before the 2013–14 NHL season, the Red Wings moved to the Eastern Conference's Atlantic Division, joining fellow Original Six teams Boston Bruins, Montreal Canadiens and Toronto Maple Leafs in the division, as well as the New York Rangers in the conference (Rangers are part of the Metropolitan Division). Chicago stayed in the Western Conference's Central Division, ending the rivalry between the two teams after almost 90 seasons. Both the Red Wings and Blackhawks only meet twice every season by virtue of being in opposite conferences, and now can only meet in the postseason if both advance to the Stanley Cup Final, however, due to the COVID-19 pandemic, the NHL temporarily realigned the divisions, regardless of conference allegiance, for the 2020–21 NHL season in order to cut down travel, with Detroit and Chicago, sharing a division (the Central) for the first time since the 2012–13 season, resuming their rivalry for at least one season for a total of eight games. In the 2021–22 NHL season, the league reverted to its 2013–20 alignment.

On February 25, 2024, the Blackhawks retired Chris Chelios' no. 7 ahead of a game with the Red Wings. That night also marked Patrick Kane's first appearance in Chicago's United Center as a visiting player. In a rare peaceful moment between the two rivals, Kane was a given a standing ovation by the home fans as a tribute to his major contributions in the Blackhawks' 2010s Stanley Cup dynasty. Kane later scored the game-winning goal in overtime and got another standing ovation.

== See also ==
- List of NHL rivalries
- Bears–Lions rivalry
- Bulls–Pistons rivalry
