= Hockey Weekend Across America =

Annual ice hockey promotional event

Hockey Weekend Across America is an annual event devised by USA Hockey to promote the game of ice hockey in the United States. The weekend is capped by "Hockey Day in America", with broadcasts of National Hockey League games on the national networks of NBC (2011–2021) and TNT (2024–present).

== 2011 ==
In 2011, each day of the three-day event had a particular theme. Friday was "Wear Your Favorite Hockey Jersey Day". Saturday, "Bring a Friend to the Rink Day", featured a number of "Try Hockey for Free" clinics throughout the country. Sunday was "Celebrate Local Hockey Heroes Day".

Four NHL games were broadcast on NBC on Sunday. The first three were regional games broadcast to specific regions of the country: Washington Capitals at Buffalo Sabres, Philadelphia Flyers at New York Rangers, and Detroit Red Wings at Minnesota Wild. The fourth game, Pittsburgh Penguins at Chicago Blackhawks, was broadcast nationally.

Coincidentally, in neighboring Canada, there were also significant hockey celebrations that weekend, associated with the 2011 Heritage Classic held the same day as Hockey Day in America. The two events were unrelated, but the NHL scheduled the Sunday games so that the regional doubleheader led into the Heritage Classic, forming a tripleheader.

The American Hockey League held the "Whale Bowl," the second annual installment of its outdoor game series, on the Saturday of the same weekend. The Providence Bruins defeated the host team Connecticut Whale 5–4 in a shootout in front of 15,234 fans at Rentschler Field. Included in the same set of festivities were two other outdoor game, one involving college hockey teams and another an alumni game featuring former members of the Boston Bruins and Hartford Whalers, the namesakes (and in the case of the Bruins, the NHL affiliate) of the two teams participating in the Whale Bowl.

Sunday's "Hockey Day in America" was headquartered at McCormick Tribune Plaza & Ice Rink within Millennium Park in Chicago, where the Stanley Cup was on display.

== 2012 ==
Hockey Weekend Across America followed a similar format for 2012. Hockey Day in America, held February 19, featured the Sabres hosting the Penguins, the Red Wings hosting the San Jose Sharks, and St. Louis at Chicago in the regional action; the Wild hosted the Bruins in the nationally televised afternoon game, while the New Jersey Devils traveled to face the Montreal Canadiens in the nightcap on NBC Sports Network. Coverage was headquartered at Landmark Plaza in St. Paul, Minnesota. The TV coverage earned the highest ratings for a non-Winter Classic regular season game since NBC took over the broadcast contract.

All 30 AHL teams played on February 19, but no outdoor games were scheduled at any level.

== 2013 ==
The 2013 Hockey Day in America, held on February 17, featured three nationally televised games: Pittsburgh at Buffalo and the Los Angeles Kings at Chicago on NBC, and Washington at New York Rangers on NBCSN. NBC headquartered its coverage from Wollman Rink in New York City.

== 2014 ==
The 2014 Hockey Weekend Across America was scheduled on March 1–2, later than previous years due to the Winter Olympic hockey tournament in mid-February. NBC Sports televised games on both days. On Saturday Night, March 1, NBC televised the closing game of the 2014 NHL Stadium Series between the Pittsburgh and Chicago. On the next day, NBC had Washington at Philadelphia; while NBCSN televised the 2014 Heritage Classic between the Ottawa Senators and the Vancouver Canucks, followed by Boston at the NY Rangers.

== 2015 ==
The 2015 Hockey Weekend Across America was held on February 21–22, during the 35th Anniversary of the "Miracle on Ice". Members of the U.S. Olympic Ice Hockey Team, who defeated the Soviet Union national team during the medal-round at the 1980 Winter Olympics, reunited at the Herb Brooks Arena in Lake Placid, New York. NBC also headquartered its coverage from Lake Placid. NBCSN televised the 2015 NHL Stadium Series between Los Angeles and the San Jose on February 21. The next day featured three nationally televised games: Washington at Philadelphia and Boston at Chicago on NBC, and the Dallas Stars at Minnesota on NBCSN.

== 2016 ==
The 2016 weekend was held on February 21, with three games under the Hockey Day in America banner being played on Sunday, February 21: Pittsburgh at Buffalo followed by a 2016 NHL Stadium Series game between Chicago and Minnesota on NBC, and then Detroit at the NY Rangers on NBCSN. The Minnesota Wild destroyed the Blackhawks 6–1 in the outdoor game. While The Rangers beat the Red Wings 1–0 in OT. The Penguins also beat the Sabres 4–3.

== 2017 ==
The 2017 weekend was held on February 19, with NBC and NBCSN combining to show a quadruple header for their Hockey Day in America coverage on Sunday, February 19. The action started on NBC with Washington at New York Rangers at 12:30 p.m. ET, followed by Detroit at Pittsburgh at 3:30 p.m. ET. The action then shifted to NBCSN with Chicago at Buffalo at 6 p.m. ET, and concluded with Boston at San Jose 8:30 p.m. ET.

== 2019 ==
The 2019 weekend was held on February 17, with NBC and NBCSN combining to show a triple-header for their Hockey Day in America coverage on Sunday, February 17. The action started on NBC with the Pittsburgh Penguins hosting the NY Rangers, followed by a game between St. Louis Blues and Minnesota Wild. The action shifts to NBCSN for a conclusion with Philadelphia at Detroit. Also, in a format change, "Inside the Glass" analyst Pierre McGuire called the early game of Hockey Day in America (12:30 p.m. ET; NBC) while Mike Emrick, Eddie Olczyk, and "Inside-the-Glass" analyst Brian Boucher called the second game of the doubleheader (3:30 p.m. ET; NBC). McGuire joins the lead team on all other NHL Game of the Week games.

== 2020 ==
The 2020 Hockey Weekend Across America was held on February 15–16 and commemorated the 40th anniversary of the Miracle on Ice. NBC Sports televised games on both days. On Saturday night, February 15, NBC broadcast the 2020 NHL Stadium Series between the Los Angeles Kings and Colorado Avalanche. The next day, NBC broadcast Detroit at Pittsburgh, followed by Boston at New York Rangers, while NBCSN showed St. Louis at Nashville.

== 2021 ==
Due to the coronavirus pandemic, the NHL reduced the regular season to 56 games. Consequently, the 2021 weekend was in March, with NBC and NBCSN combining to show a quadruple header for their Hockey Day in America coverage on Sunday, March 7.

This was also NBC's final season covering NHL games, as the national television contracts in the U.S. were awarded to ESPN/ABC and TNT effective the 2021–22 season. In 2022 and 2023, neither ESPN nor TNT continued NBC's tradition of covering special NHL broadcasts as part of Hockey Day in America.

== 2024 ==
In 2024, TNT revived the Hockey Day in America tradition with a doubleheader on February 25. The first game involved the Tampa Bay Lightning at the New Jersey Devils, and the second game featured the Philadelphia Flyers at the Pittsburgh Penguins. The games would also mark the beginning of TNT's late-season Sunday slate of games.

== 2025 ==
In 2025, Hockey Day in America returned with a doubleheader on February 23. The first game involved the Edmonton Oilers at the Washington Capitals, and the second game featured the New York Rangers at the Pittsburgh Penguins. Both games aired on TNT, marking the beginning of their late-season Sunday slate of games. Additionally, ESPN+ aired a third game, which featured the Toronto Maple Leafs at the Chicago Blackhawks. In addition, TNT's sister channel TruTV, along with ESPN2 and other Disney platforms, aired "Skate for LA Strong", a benefit celebrity hockey game raising funds for the LA Fire Relief Fund.

== 2026 ==
Hockey Day in America on TNT took place on March 8 with a matinee doubleheader. The first game featured the Minnesota Wild visiting the Colorado Avalanche, followed by the Boston Bruins visiting the Pittsburgh Penguins.

== See also ==
- Hockey Day in Canada
