= 2020–21 Ottawa Senators season =

Season of professional ice hockey team

2020–21 Ottawa Senators
- Division: 6th North
- 2020–21 record: 23–28–5
- Home record: 14–10–4
- Road record: 9–18–1
- Goals for: 157
- Goals against: 190

Team information
- General manager: Pierre Dorion
- Coach: D. J. Smith
- Captain: Vacant
- Alternate captains: Thomas Chabot; Erik Gudbranson (Jan.–Apr.); Nick Paul (Apr.–May.); Derek Stepan; Brady Tkachuk
- Arena: Canadian Tire Centre
- Minor league affiliate: Belleville Senators (AHL)

Team leaders
- Goals: Connor Brown (21)
- Assists: Thomas Chabot (25)
- Points: Brady Tkachuk (36)
- Penalty minutes: Brady Tkachuk (69)
- Plus/minus: Alex Formenton; Shane Pinto (+6)
- Wins: Matt Murray (10)
- Goals against average: Filip Gustavsson (2.16)

The 2020–21 Ottawa Senators season was the 29th season of the Ottawa Senators of the National Hockey League (NHL). The Senators finished the season out of the playoffs for the fourth consecutive season.

Due to the Canada–U.S. border restrictions brought in as a result of the COVID-19 pandemic, the NHL realigned its divisions. The Senators were re-aligned with the other six Canadian franchises into the newly formed North Division. The league's 56–game season is to be played entirely within the new divisions, meaning that Ottawa and the other Canadian teams played an all-Canadian schedule for the 2020–21 regular season as well as the first two rounds of the 2021 Stanley Cup playoffs.

The Senators' season started off poorly; they began a nine-game losing streak in the second game of the season, and could not make up for the poor start, although they had a strong final month of play, finishing the season with a 10–3–1 run. In the off-season, the Senators had picked up a number of veteran free agents and traded for veteran goalie Matt Murray. The team had not played in over 10 months at the start of the season, and it showed in the long losing streak. As the season wore on, the team played more of their younger players and traded a number of the veterans at the trading deadline. Brady Tkachuk was the leading points scorer for the team and Connor Brown scored 21 goals to lead the team.

The Senators were officially eliminated from playoff contention with a 3–2 overtime loss to the Montreal Canadiens on May 2.

== Team business ==
The team introduced three new jerseys for the season. Two were updated versions of the team's original jerseys used from 1992–1997 and a third was a "Reverse Retro" incorporating the style of the black original jersey, using red as the base colour instead.

In December 2020, the team announced a seven-year lease extension with the city of Belleville, Ontario, to host their American Hockey League affiliate, the Belleville Senators, through the 2026–27 AHL season. However, due the COVID-19 pandemic, the Belleville Senators played their delayed-start season in Ottawa at the Canadian Tire Centre instead.

As there were ongoing restrictions amidst the COVID-19 pandemic, the start of the season was delayed and the Senators were granted permission by the provincial government to play in its home arena as long as it was without spectators. Owner Eugene Melnyk made public his proposal to seat up to 6,000 fans, but withdrew the proposal after criticism.

In January 2021, former team general John Muckler died and was honoured at the first game. Muckler was the team's general manager when the team played in the 2007 Stanley Cup Finals. Also in January 2021, the team's former head of graphic design Kevin Caradonna died. Caradonna had designed the "forward-facing" logo used from 1997 until 2020 and the team's mascot "Spartacat."

In February 2021, the Brampton Beast, the team's ECHL affiliate, announced that it had ceased operations permanently. The team had been one of several ECHL teams to voluntarily suspend operations before the 2020–21 season due to the COVID-19 pandemic.

== Off-season ==
The Senators parted ways with long-time goaltender Craig Anderson, announcing that they would not offer him a new contract. The team also parted ways with forward Bobby Ryan, buying out his contract. The team did not offer contracts to Mark Borowiecki and Anthony Duclair. The team also traded players on the long-term injured list: Marian Gaborik and Anders Nilsson to the Tampa Bay Lightning, who used the contracts for salary cap relief.

On the second day of the 2020 NHL entry draft, the team traded for veteran Pittsburgh Penguins goaltender Matt Murray, giving up a 2020 second-round pick and Jonathan Gruden, a 2018 fourth-round pick. The team picked up several veterans in trades, including Braydon Coburn, Erik Gudbranson, Cedric Paquette, Derek Stepan, and Austin Watson. The team acquired NHL veterans Evgenii Dadonov and Alex Galchenyuk as free agents.

== Regular season ==
The team played its first game of the season on January 15, 2021, defeating the "Battle of Ontario" rival Toronto Maple Leafs at the Canadian Tire Centre. It was the team's first game in 310 days. The team had nine new players in the lineup, including 2020 first-round pick Tim Stützle. The Senators proceeded to lose nine games in a row in January, before defeating the Montreal Canadiens on February 4.

On February 15, 2021, the Senators made their first-ever comeback in team history from being four or more goals behind. The team was down 5–1 in Toronto to the Maple Leafs near the end of the second period. Nick Paul started the comeback with a shorthanded goal. In the third period, Artyom Zub scored his first NHL goal on a breakaway after exiting the penalty box. Connor Brown later scored just after a power play, and Evgenii Dadonov scored twice; first to tie the game with two minutes to play with Ottawa goalie Marcus Hogberg on the bench for an extra attacker and then scored on a breakaway to win the game 6–5 in overtime. However, he made a save while in the crease to stop Toronto's potential overtime goal.

The Senators goaltenders suffered a rash of injuries, causing the team to use five goaltenders. Matt Murray, Marcus Hogberg and Joey Daccord were all injured at one time. Daccord's injury ended his season. The Senators called up Filip Gustavsson for his first NHL game and picked up Anton Forsberg on waivers.

Prior to the trade deadline, the Senators picked up Ryan Dzingel for his second term with the team, trading Alex Galchenyuk and Cedric Paquette to the Carolina Hurricanes. At the trade deadline, well out of a playoff spot, the Senators traded several veterans for draft picks. Erik Gudbranson went to the Nashville Predators for Brandon Fortunato and a 2023 seventh-round draft pick. Mike Reilly was traded to the Boston Bruins for a third-round pick in the 2022. Braydon Coburn was traded to the New York Islanders for a seventh-round pick in the 2022 NHL Entry Draft.

Connor Brown set a team record, scoring in eight consecutive games, beating the previous record of six, held by Jason Spezza and Daniel Alfredsson.

=== Standings ===
North Division
Pos	Team	GP	W	L	OTL	RW	GF	GA	GD	Pts
1	y – Toronto Maple Leafs	56	35	14	7	29	187	148	+39	77
2	x – Edmonton Oilers	56	35	19	2	31	183	154	+29	72
3	x – Winnipeg Jets	56	30	23	3	24	170	154	+16	63
4	x – Montreal Canadiens	56	24	21	11	20	159	168	−9	59
5	Calgary Flames	56	26	27	3	22	156	161	−5	55
6	Ottawa Senators	56	23	28	5	18	157	190	−33	51
7	Vancouver Canucks	56	23	29	4	17	151	188	−37	50

Source: National Hockey League
Rules for classification: 1) Fewer number of games played (GP, only during regular season); 2) Greater number of regulation wins (RW); 3) Greater number of wins in regulation and overtime, excluding shootout wins (ROW); 4) Greater number of total wins, including shootouts (W); 5) Greater number of points earned in head-to-head play; if teams played an uneven number of head-to-head games, the result of the first game on the home ice of the team with the extra home game is discarded; 6) Greater goal differential (GD); 7) Greater number of goals scored (GF)
x – Clinched playoff spot; y – Clinched division

=== Schedule and results ===
The regular season schedule was published on December 23, 2020.

2020–21 game log

January: 1–7–1 (Home: 1–2–1; Road: 0–5–0)
#	Date	Visitor	Score	Home	OT	Decision	Attendance	Record	Pts	Recap
1	January 15	Toronto	3–5	Ottawa		Murray	0	1–0–0	2
2	January 16	Toronto	3–2	Ottawa		Murray	0	1–1–0	2
3	January 19	Winnipeg	4–3	Ottawa	OT	Murray	0	1–1–1	3
4	January 21	Winnipeg	4–1	Ottawa		Murray	0	1–2–1	3
5	January 23	Ottawa	3–6	Winnipeg		Hogberg	0	1–3–1	3
6	January 25	Ottawa	1–7	Vancouver		Murray	0	1–4–1	3
7	January 27	Ottawa	1–5	Vancouver		Hogberg	0	1–5–1	3
8	January 28	Ottawa	1–4	Vancouver		Murray	0	1–6–1	3
9	January 31	Ottawa	5–8	Edmonton		Hogberg	0	1–7–1	3

February: 6–8–0 (Home: 3–4–0; Road: 3–4–0)
#	Date	Visitor	Score	Home	OT	Decision	Attendance	Record	Pts	Recap
10	February 2	Ottawa	2–4	Edmonton		Hogberg	0	1–8–1	3
11	February 4	Ottawa	3–2	Montreal		Murray	0	2–8–1	5
12	February 6	Montreal	2–1	Ottawa		Murray	0	2–9–1	5
13	February 8	Edmonton	3–1	Ottawa		Murray	0	2–10–1	5
14	February 9	Edmonton	3–2	Ottawa		Hogberg	0	2–11–1	5
15	February 11	Ottawa	1–5	Winnipeg		Murray	0	2–12–1	5
16	February 13	Ottawa	2–1	Winnipeg		Hogberg	0	3–12–1	7
17	February 15	Ottawa	6–5	Toronto	OT	Hogberg	0	4–12–1	9
18	February 17	Ottawa	1–2	Toronto		Murray	0	4–13–1	9
19	February 18	Ottawa	3–7	Toronto		Murray	0	4–14–1	9
20	February 21	Montreal	2–3	Ottawa	OT	Murray	0	5–14–1	11
21	February 23	Montreal	4–5	Ottawa	SO	Murray	0	6–14–1	13
22	February 25	Calgary	1–6	Ottawa		Murray	0	7–14–1	15
23	February 27	Calgary	6–3	Ottawa		Murray	0	7–15–1	15

March: 5–5–3 (Home: 4–0–3; Road: 1–5–0)
#	Date	Visitor	Score	Home	OT	Decision	Attendance	Record	Pts	Recap
24	March 1	Calgary	1–5	Ottawa		Murray	0	8–15–1	17
25	March 2	Ottawa	1–3	Montreal		Daccord	0	8–16–1	17
26	March 4	Ottawa	3–7	Calgary		Murray	0	8–17–1	17
27	March 7	Ottawa	4–3	Calgary	SO	Murray	0	9–17–1	19
28	March 8	Ottawa	2–3	Edmonton		Daccord	0	9–18–1	19
29	March 10	Ottawa	1–7	Edmonton		Murray	0	9–19–1	19
30	March 12	Ottawa	2–6	Edmonton		Daccord	0	9–20–1	19
31	March 14	Toronto	3–4	Ottawa		Daccord	0	10–20–1	21
32	March 15	Vancouver	3–2	Ottawa	OT	Daccord	0	10–20–2	22
33	March 17	Vancouver	3–2	Ottawa	SO	Gustavsson	0	10–20–3	23
34	March 22	Calgary	1–2	Ottawa		Gustavsson	0	11–20–3	25
35	March 24	Calgary	1–3	Ottawa		Gustavsson	0	12–20–3	27
36	March 25	Toronto	3–2	Ottawa	OT	Forsberg	0	12–20–4	28
—	March 28	Ottawa		Montreal	Postponed due to COVID-19. Rescheduled for April 17.

April: 7–7–0 (Home: 3–4–0; Road: 4–3–0)
#	Date	Visitor	Score	Home	OT	Decision	Attendance	Record	Pts	Recap
37	April 1	Montreal	4–1	Ottawa		Gustavsson	0	12–21–4	28
38	April 3	Ottawa	6–3	Montreal		Forsberg	0	13–21–4	30
39	April 5	Ottawa	3–4	Winnipeg		Forsberg	0	13–22–4	30
40	April 7	Edmonton	4–2	Ottawa		Hogberg	0	13–23–4	30
41	April 8	Edmonton	3–1	Ottawa		Forsberg	0	13–24–4	30
42	April 10	Ottawa	5–6	Toronto		Forsberg	0	13–25–4	30
43	April 12	Winnipeg	2–4	Ottawa		Forsberg	0	14–25–4	32
44	April 14	Winnipeg	3–2	Ottawa		Murray	0	14–26–4	32
45	April 17	Ottawa	4–0	Montreal		Murray	0	15–26–4	34
46	April 19	Ottawa	4–2	Calgary		Murray	0	16–26–4	36
47	April 22	Ottawa	3–0	Vancouver		Murray	0	17–26–4	38
48	April 24	Ottawa	2–4	Vancouver		Hogberg	0	17–27–4	38
49	April 26	Vancouver	1–2	Ottawa		Hogberg	0	18–27–4	40
50	April 28	Vancouver	3–6	Ottawa		Hogberg	0	19–27–4	42

May: 4–1–1 (Home: 3–0–0; Road: 1–1–1)
#	Date	Visitor	Score	Home	OT	Decision	Attendance	Record	Pts	Recap
51	May 1	Ottawa	2–3	Montreal	OT	Gustavsson	0	19–27–5	43
52	May 3	Winnipeg	1–2	Ottawa		Gustavsson	0	20–27–5	45
53	May 5	Montreal	1–5	Ottawa		Forsberg	0	21–27–5	47
54	May 8	Ottawa	4–2	Winnipeg		Gustavsson	0	22–27–5	49
55	May 9	Ottawa	1–6	Calgary		Forsberg	0	22–28–5	49
56	May 12	Toronto	3–4	Ottawa	OT	Gustavsson	0	23–28–5	51

Legend: Win (2 points) Loss (0 points) Overtime/shootout loss (1 point)

== Player statistics ==
=== Skaters ===
Regular season
Player	GP	G	A	Pts	+/−	PIM
Brady Tkachuk	56	17	19	36	−17	69
Connor Brown	56	21	14	35	+1	12
Josh Norris	56	17	18	35	−12	13
Drake Batherson	56	17	17	34	−17	8
Thomas Chabot	49	6	25	31	−15	36
Tim Stützle	53	12	17	29	−18	14
Evgenii Dadonov	55	13	7	20	−9	4
Nick Paul	56	5	15	20	+5	19
Chris Tierney	55	6	13	19	−12	8
Mike Reilly^{‡}	40	0	19	19	−2	18
Colin White	45	10	8	18	−6	16
Nikita Zaitsev	55	4	13	17	−13	26
Artyom Zub	47	3	11	14	+4	26
Erik Brannstrom	30	2	11	13	+3	25
Austin Watson	34	3	7	10	−7	40
Ryan Dzingel^{†}	29	6	3	9	−3	19
Artem Anisimov	19	2	7	9	+1	2
Shane Pinto	12	1	6	7	+6	10
Alex Formenton	20	4	2	6	+6	6
Derek Stepan	20	1	5	6	−6	8
Erik Gudbranson^{‡}	36	1	2	3	−13	47
Christian Wolanin^{‡}	15	0	3	3	−7	6
Clark Bishop	13	0	3	3	+2	4
Victor Mete^{†}	14	1	1	2	+5	2
Braydon Coburn^{‡}	16	0	2	2	−3	10
Alex Galchenyuk^{‡}	8	1	0	1	−6	6
Cedric Paquette^{‡}	9	1	0	1	−8	4
Parker Kelly	1	1	0	1	+1	0
Michael Amadio^{†}	5	0	1	1	+2	2
Matthew Peca	5	0	1	1	+1	0
Josh Brown	26	0	1	1	−1	30
Micheal Haley	4	0	0	0	−1	5
Jacob Bernard-Docker	5	0	0	0	+2	0
Filip Chlapik^{‡}	1	0	0	0	+1	0
Olle Alsing	4	0	0	0	−1	0
Vitalii Abramov	2	0	0	0	0	0
Logan Brown	1	0	0	0	0	2

=== Goaltenders ===
Regular season
Player	GP	GS	TOI	W	L	OT	GA	GAA	SA	SV%	SO	G	A	PIM
Matt Murray	27	25	1,404:11	10	13	1	79	3.38	738	.893	2	0	1	2
Filip Gustavsson	9	7	471:34	5	1	2	17	2.16	254	.933	0	0	0	0
Marcus Hogberg	14	10	641:51	4	7	0	40	3.74	322	.876	0	0	0	0
Anton Forsberg^{†}	8	8	448:33	3	4	1	24	3.21	264	.909	0	0	0	0
Joey Daccord	8	6	403:22	1	3	1	22	3.27	214	.897	0	0	0	0

^{†}Denotes player spent time with another team before joining the Senators. Stats reflect time with the Senators only.
^{‡}No longer with the Senators.

== Awards and honours ==
=== Milestones ===
Player	Milestone	Date
Tim Stützle	1st career NHL game	January 15, 2021
Matt Murray	200th career NHL game	January 15, 2021
Josh Norris	1st career NHL assist 1st career NHL point	January 15, 2021
Tim Stützle	1st career NHL goal 1st career NHL point	January 16, 2021
Josh Norris	1st career NHL goal	January 19, 2021
Josh Brown	100th career NHL game	January 28, 2021
Artyom Zub	1st career NHL game 1st career NHL assist 1st career NHL point	January 31, 2021
Tim Stützle	1st career NHL assist	February 4, 2021
Artyom Zub	1st career NHL goal	February 15, 2021
Brady Tkachuk	100th career NHL point	February 17, 2021
Nikita Zaitsev	300th career NHL game	February 18, 2021
Evgenii Dadonov	300th career NHL game	February 21, 2021
Thomas Chabot	100th career NHL assist	February 27, 2021
Evgenii Dadonov	100th career NHL goal	March 10, 2021
Shane Pinto	1st career NHL assist 1st career NHL point	April 17, 2021
Shane Pinto	1st career NHL goal	May 5, 2021
Parker Kelly	1st career NHL game 1st career NHL goal 1st career NHL point	May 12, 2021

== Transactions ==
The Senators have been involved in the following transactions during the 2020–21 season.

=== Trades ===
Date	Details		Ref
October 7, 2020	To Pittsburgh Penguins Jonathan Gruden; CBJ's 2nd-round pick (52nd) in 2020	To Ottawa Senators Matt Murray	
October 7, 2020	To Toronto Maple Leafs NYI's 2nd-round pick (59th) in 2020; 3rd-round pick (64th) in 2020	To Ottawa Senators 2nd-round pick (44th) in 2020	
October 8, 2020	To Anaheim Ducks EDM's 5th-round pick in 2021	To Ottawa Senators Erik Gudbranson	
October 10, 2020	To Nashville Predators COL's 4th-round pick in 2021	To Ottawa Senators Austin Watson	
December 21, 2020	To Nashville Predators Michael Carcone	To Ottawa Senators Zach Magwood	
December 26, 2020	To Arizona Coyotes CBJ's 2nd-round pick in 2021	To Ottawa Senators Derek Stepan	
December 27, 2020	To Tampa Bay Lightning Marian Gaborik; Anders Nilsson	To Ottawa Senators Braydon Coburn; Cedric Paquette; 2nd round pick in 2022	
January 12, 2021	To Carolina Hurricanes Maxime Lajoie	To Ottawa Senators Clark Bishop	
January 27, 2021	To San Jose Sharks Christian Jaros	To Ottawa Senators Jack Kopacka; 7th round pick in 2022	
February 13, 2021	To Carolina Hurricanes Alex Galchenyuk; Cedric Paquette	To Ottawa Senators Ryan Dzingel	
March 29, 2021	To Los Angeles Kings Christian Wolanin	To Ottawa Senators Michael Amadio	
April 11, 2021	To Boston Bruins Mike Reilly	To Ottawa Senators 3rd-round pick in 2022	
April 11, 2021	To New York Islanders Braydon Coburn	To Ottawa Senators 7th-round pick in 2022	
April 12, 2021	To Nashville Predators Erik Gudbranson	To Ottawa Senators Brandon Fortunato; 7th-round pick in 2023	

=== Free agents ===
Date	Player	Team	Contract term	Source
May 19, 2020	Mikkel Boedker	to HC Lugano (Swiss NL)	1-year	
July 22, 2020	Jordan Szwarz	to Torpedo Nizhny Novgorod (KHL)	1-year	
September 20, 2020	Andreas Englund	to Vasterviks IK (Allsv)	1-year	
October 9, 2020	Mark Borowiecki	to Nashville Predators	2-year	
October 9, 2020	Logan Shaw	from Winnipeg Jets	2-year, two-way	
October 9, 2020	Bobby Ryan	to Detroit Red Wings	1-year	
October 15, 2020	Evgenii Dadonov	from Florida Panthers	3-year	
October 16, 2020	Scott Sabourin	to Toronto Marlies (AHL)	1-year	
October 19, 2020	Jayce Hawryluk	to Vancouver Canucks	1-year, two-way	
October 28, 2020	Alex Galchenyuk	from Minnesota Wild	1-year	
November 13, 2020	Micheal Haley	from New York Rangers	1-year, two-way	
December 17, 2020	Anthony Duclair	to Florida Panthers	1-year	
January 13, 2021	Craig Anderson	to Washington Capitals	1-year	
March 2, 2021	Filip Chlapik	to Lahti Pelicans	1-year	

=== Waivers ===
Date	Player	Team	Ref
January 12, 2021	Rudolfs Balcers	to San Jose Sharks	
March 17, 2021	Anton Forsberg	from Winnipeg Jets	
April 12, 2021	Victor Mete	from Montreal Canadiens	

=== Contract terminations ===
Date	Player	Via	Source
September 26, 2020	Bobby Ryan	Buyout	
February 26, 2021	Filip Chlapik	Buyout	

=== Retirement ===
Date	Player	Source

=== Signings ===
Date	Player	Contract term	Source
October 5, 2020	Josh Brown	2 years	
October 9, 2020	Matt Murray	4 years	
October 9, 2020	Matthew Peca	1-year, two-way	
October 14, 2020	Nick Paul	2 years	
October 16, 2020	Rudolfs Balcers	1-year, two-way	
October 17, 2020	Joey Daccord	3-year, two-way	
October 19, 2020	J.C. Beaudin	1-year, two-way	
October 22, 2020	Connor Brown	3 years	
October 26, 2020	Chris Tierney	2 years	
October 27, 2020	Filip Chlapik	1-year, two-way	
November 4, 2020	Christian Jaros	1-year, two-way	
November 20, 2020	Egor Sokolov	3-year, entry-level	
December 7, 2020	Tim Stützle	3-year, entry-level	
December 29, 2020	Ridly Greig	3-year, entry-level	
March 17, 2021	Angus Crookshank	3-year, entry-level	
April 1, 2021	Shane Pinto	3-year, entry-level	
April 1, 2021	Jacob Bernard-Docker	3-year, entry-level	
April 3, 2021	Maxence Guenette	3-year, entry-level	
April 13, 2021	Mads Sogaard	3-year, entry-level	
April 16, 2021	Cole Reinhardt	3-year, entry-level	
April 27, 2021	Roby Jarventie	3-year, entry-level	
May 5, 2021	Anton Forsberg	1-year extension	
May 14, 2021	Artyom Zub	2-year extension	
May 20, 2021	Clark Bishop	1-year, two-way	

== Draft picks ==
Below are the Ottawa Senators' selections at the 2020 NHL entry draft, which was originally scheduled for June 26–27, 2020 at the Bell Center in Montreal, Quebec, but was postponed on March 25, 2020, due to the COVID-19 pandemic. It was held October 6–7, 2020 virtually via Video conference call from the NHL Network studio in Secaucus, New Jersey.

Round	Overall	Player	Position	Nationality	Club team
1	3	Tim Stützle	C	Germany	Adler Mannheim (DEL)
1	5	Jake Sanderson	D	United States	U.S. NTDP (USHL)
1	28	Ridly Greig	C	Canada	Brandon Wheat Kings (WHL)
2	33	Roby Jarventie	LW	Finland	Ilves Tampere (SM-liiga)
2	44	Tyler Kleven	D	United States	U.S. NTDP (USHL)
2	61	Egor Sokolov	LW	Russia	Cape Breton Eagles (QMJHL)
3	71	Leevi Merilainen	G	Finland	Karpat (SM-liiga)
5	155	Eric Engstrand	LW	Sweden	Malmö Redhawks (SHL)
6	158	Philippe Daoust	LW	Canada	Moncton Wildcats (QMJHL)
6	181	Cole Reinhardt	LW	Canada	Brandon Wheat Kings (WHL)
