= Engstrand =

Engstrand is a surname. Notable people with the surname include:

- Christian Engstrand (born 1988), Swedish ice hockey player
- Eric Engstrand (born 2000), Swedish ice hockey player
- Olle Engstrand (born 1943), Swedish professor of Phonetics
- Tommy Engstrand (1939–2021), Swedish sports commentator
