= 2020–21 Montreal Canadiens season =

Season of play of professional ice hockey team

2020–21 Montreal Canadiens
- Division: 4th North
- 2020–21 record: 24–21–11
- Home record: 13–11–4
- Road record: 11–10–7
- Goals for: 159
- Goals against: 168

Team information
- General manager: Marc Bergevin
- Coach: Claude Julien (Jan. 13 – Feb. 24); Dominique Ducharme (interim, Feb. 24 – Jul. 7)
- Captain: Shea Weber
- Alternate captains: Paul Byron; Brendan Gallagher
- Arena: Bell Centre
- Minor league affiliate: Laval Rocket (AHL)

Team leaders
- Goals: Tyler Toffoli (28)
- Assists: Jeff Petry (30)
- Points: Tyler Toffoli (44)
- Penalty minutes: Ben Chiarot (50)
- Plus/minus: Joel Edmundson (+28)
- Wins: Carey Price (12)
- Goals against average: Carey Price (2.64)

The 2020–21 Montreal Canadiens season was the 112th for the club that was established on December 4, 1909, and their 104th season as a franchise in the National Hockey League (NHL).

Due to the Canada–U.S. border restrictions brought in as a result of the COVID-19 pandemic, the Canadiens were re-aligned with the other six Canadian franchises into the newly formed North Division. The league's 56 game season was played entirely within the new divisions, meaning that Montreal and the other Canadian teams played an all-Canadian schedule for the 2020–21 regular season as well as the first two rounds of the 2021 Stanley Cup playoffs.

On May 10, 2021, the Canadiens clinched a playoff berth after a 4–3 overtime loss to the Edmonton Oilers. In the first round, the Canadiens successfully overcame a 3–1 series deficit to defeat the Toronto Maple Leafs in seven games. In the second round, the Canadiens swept the Winnipeg Jets in four games. Since they were the lowest-remaining team from the second round, they played against the Vegas Golden Knights in the Stanley Cup semifinals, defeating them in six games. The Canadiens won the Clarence S. Campbell Bowl, for the first, and, barring future playoff format changes, only time in their franchise history, and advanced to the Stanley Cup Final for the first time since 1993, subsequently ending a 10-year Canadian team Finals appearance drought, the Vancouver Canucks (in 2011) being the previous team to reach such juncture. In the 2021 Stanley Cup Final against the Tampa Bay Lightning, the Canadiens lost the first three games of the series, finally earning a win in game four. However, the Canadiens were defeated in five games.

Due to their clutch playing and unexpected comeback against the Toronto Maple Leafs, the Canadiens were widely considered to have one of the most improbable playoff runs in NHL history, which has been cited as one of the greatest cinderella runs in league history, despite, as mentioned, losing to the Tampa Bay Lightning in five games in the Stanley Cup Final.

== Standings ==
=== Divisional standings ===
North Division
Pos	Team	GP	W	L	OTL	RW	GF	GA	GD	Pts
1	y – Toronto Maple Leafs	56	35	14	7	29	187	148	+39	77
2	x – Edmonton Oilers	56	35	19	2	31	183	154	+29	72
3	x – Winnipeg Jets	56	30	23	3	24	170	154	+16	63
4	x – Montreal Canadiens	56	24	21	11	20	159	168	−9	59
5	Calgary Flames	56	26	27	3	22	156	161	−5	55
6	Ottawa Senators	56	23	28	5	18	157	190	−33	51
7	Vancouver Canucks	56	23	29	4	17	151	188	−37	50

Source: National Hockey League
Rules for classification: 1) Fewer number of games played (GP, only during regular season); 2) Greater number of regulation wins (RW); 3) Greater number of wins in regulation and overtime, excluding shootout wins (ROW); 4) Greater number of total wins, including shootouts (W); 5) Greater number of points earned in head-to-head play; if teams played an uneven number of head-to-head games, the result of the first game on the home ice of the team with the extra home game is discarded; 6) Greater goal differential (GD); 7) Greater number of goals scored (GF)
x – Clinched playoff spot; y – Clinched division

== Schedule and results ==
=== Regular season ===
The regular season schedule was published on December 23, 2020.

2020–21 game log

January: 5–1–2 (Home: 1–1–0; Road: 4–0–2)
#	Date	Visitor	Score	Home	OT	Decision	Attendance	Record	Pts	Recap
1	January 13	Montreal	4–5	Toronto	OT	Price	0	0–0–1	1
2	January 16	Montreal	5–1	Edmonton		Price	0	1–0–1	3
3	January 18	Montreal	3–1	Edmonton		Allen	0	2–0–1	5
4	January 20	Montreal	5–6	Vancouver	SO	Price	0	2–0–2	6
5	January 21	Montreal	7–3	Vancouver		Allen	0	3–0–2	8
6	January 23	Montreal	5–2	Vancouver		Price	0	4–0–2	10
7	January 28	Calgary	2–4	Montreal		Price	0	5–0–2	12
8	January 30	Calgary	2–0	Montreal		Allen	0	5–1–2	12

February: 4–5–3 (Home: 2–4–0; Road: 2–1–3)
#	Date	Visitor	Score	Home	OT	Decision	Attendance	Record	Pts	Recap
9	February 1	Vancouver	2–6	Montreal		Price	0	6–1–2	14
10	February 2	Vancouver	3–5	Montreal		Allen	0	7–1–2	16
11	February 4	Ottawa	3–2	Montreal		Price	0	7–2–2	16
12	February 6	Montreal	2–1	Ottawa		Allen	0	8–2–2	18
13	February 10	Toronto	4–2	Montreal		Price	0	8–3–2	18
14	February 11	Edmonton	3–0	Montreal		Allen	0	8–4–2	18
15	February 13	Montreal	2–1	Toronto		Price	0	9–4–2	20
16	February 20	Toronto	5–3	Montreal		Price	0	9–5–2	20
17	February 21	Montreal	2–3	Ottawa	OT	Allen	0	9–5–3	21
18	February 23	Montreal	4–5	Ottawa	SO	Price	0	9–5–4	22
19	February 25	Montreal	3–6	Winnipeg		Price	0	9–6–4	22
20	February 27	Montreal	1–2	Winnipeg	OT	Allen	0	9–6–5	23

March: 6–2–4 (Home: 4–0–2; Road: 2–2–2)
#	Date	Visitor	Score	Home	OT	Decision	Attendance	Record	Pts	Recap
21	March 2	Ottawa	1–3	Montreal		Price	0	10–6–5	25
22	March 4	Winnipeg	4–3	Montreal	OT	Allen	0	10–6–6	26
23	March 6	Winnipeg	1–7	Montreal		Price	0	11–6–6	28
24	March 8	Montreal	1–2	Vancouver	SO	Price	0	11–6–7	29
25	March 10	Montreal	5–1	Vancouver		Price	0	12–6–7	31
26	March 11	Montreal	1–2	Calgary		Allen	0	12–7–7	31
27	March 13	Montreal	1–3	Calgary		Price	0	12–8–7	31
28	March 15	Montreal	4–2	Winnipeg		Price	0	13–8–7	33
29	March 17	Montreal	3–4	Winnipeg	OT	Price	0	13–8–8	34
30	March 19	Vancouver	3–2	Montreal	OT	Allen	0	13–8–9	35
31	March 20	Vancouver	4–5	Montreal	SO	Price	0	14–8–9	37
—	March 22	Edmonton		Montreal	Postponed due to COVID-19. Rescheduled for March 30.
—	March 24	Edmonton		Montreal	Postponed due to COVID-19. Rescheduled for May 10.
—	March 26	Edmonton		Montreal	Postponed due to COVID-19. Rescheduled for May 12.
—	March 28	Ottawa		Montreal	Postponed due to COVID-19. Rescheduled for April 17.
32	March 30	Edmonton	0–4	Montreal		Price	0	15–8–9	39

April: 7–10–0 (Home: 4–6–0; Road: 3–4–0)
#	Date	Visitor	Score	Home	OT	Decision	Attendance	Record	Pts	Recap
33	April 1	Montreal	4–1	Ottawa		Allen	0	16–8–9	41
34	April 3	Ottawa	6–3	Montreal		Price	0	16–9–9	41
35	April 5	Edmonton	2–3	Montreal	OT	Price	0	17–9–9	43
36	April 7	Montreal	2–3	Toronto		Allen	0	17–10–9	43
37	April 8	Winnipeg	4–2	Montreal		Allen	0	17–11–9	43
38	April 10	Winnipeg	5–0	Montreal		Allen	0	17–12–9	43
39	April 12	Toronto	2–4	Montreal		Allen	0	18–12–9	45
40	April 14	Calgary	4–1	Montreal		Allen	0	18–13–9	45
41	April 16	Calgary	1–2	Montreal		Allen	0	19–13–9	47
42	April 17	Ottawa	4–0	Montreal		Price	0	19–14–9	47
43	April 19	Montreal	1–4	Edmonton		Allen	0	19–15–9	47
44	April 21	Montreal	4–3	Edmonton		Allen	0	20–15–9	49
45	April 23	Montreal	2–4	Calgary		Allen	0	20–16–9	49
46	April 24	Montreal	2–5	Calgary		Primeau	0	20–17–9	49
47	April 26	Montreal	2–1	Calgary		Allen	0	21–17–9	51
48	April 28	Toronto	4–1	Montreal		Allen	0	21–18–9	51
49	April 30	Winnipeg	3–5	Montreal		Allen	0	22–18–9	53

May: 2–3–2 (Home: 2–0–2; Road: 0–3–0)
#	Date	Visitor	Score	Home	OT	Decision	Attendance	Record	Pts	Recap
50	May 1	Ottawa	2–3	Montreal	OT	Primeau	0	23–18–9	55
51	May 3	Toronto	2–3	Montreal	OT	Allen	0	24–18–9	57
52	May 5	Montreal	1–5	Ottawa		Allen	0	24–19–9	57
53	May 6	Montreal	2–5	Toronto		Primeau	0	24–20–9	57
54	May 8	Montreal	2–3	Toronto		Allen	0	24–21–9	57
55	May 10	Edmonton	4–3	Montreal	OT	Allen	0	24–21–10	58
56	May 12	Edmonton	4–3	Montreal	OT	Primeau	0	24–21–11	59

Legend: Win (2 points) Loss (0 points) Overtime/shootout loss (1 point)

=== Playoffs ===
2021 Stanley Cup playoffs

North Division First Round vs. (N1) Toronto Maple Leafs: Montreal won 4–3
#	Date	Visitor	Score	Home	OT	Decision	Attendance	Series	Recap
1	May 20	Montreal	2–1	Toronto		Price	0	1–0
2	May 22	Montreal	1–5	Toronto		Price	0	1–1
3	May 24	Toronto	2–1	Montreal		Price	0	1–2
4	May 25	Toronto	4–0	Montreal		Price	0	1–3
5	May 27	Montreal	4–3	Toronto	OT	Price	0	2–3
6	May 29	Toronto	2–3	Montreal	OT	Price	5,112	3–3
7	May 31	Montreal	3–1	Toronto		Price	550	4–3

North Division Second Round vs. (N3) Winnipeg Jets: Montreal won 4–0
#	Date	Visitor	Score	Home	OT	Decision	Attendance	Series	Recap
1	June 2	Montreal	5–3	Winnipeg		Price	500	1–0
2	June 4	Montreal	1–0	Winnipeg		Price	500	2–0
3	June 6	Winnipeg	1–5	Montreal		Price	5,326	3–0
4	June 7	Winnipeg	2–3	Montreal	OT	Price	5,539	4–0

Stanley Cup semifinals vs. (W2) Vegas Golden Knights: Montreal won 4–2
#	Date	Visitor	Score	Home	OT	Decision	Attendance	Series	Recap
1	June 14	Montreal	1–4	Vegas		Price	17,884	0–1
2	June 16	Montreal	3–2	Vegas		Price	17,920	1–1
3	June 18	Vegas	2–3	Montreal	OT	Price	6,178	2–1
4	June 20	Vegas	2–1	Montreal	OT	Price	6,391	2–2
5	June 22	Montreal	4–1	Vegas		Price	17,969	3–2
6	June 24	Vegas	2–3	Montreal	OT	Price	6,603	4–2

Stanley Cup Final vs. (C3) Tampa Bay Lightning: Tampa Bay won 4–1
#	Date	Visitor	Score	Home	OT	Decision	Attendance	Series	Recap
1	June 28	Montreal	1–5	Tampa Bay		Price	15,911	0–1
2	June 30	Montreal	1–3	Tampa Bay		Price	17,166	0–2
3	July 2	Tampa Bay	6–3	Montreal		Price	7,456	0–3
4	July 5	Tampa Bay	2–3	Montreal	OT	Price	7,669	1–3
5	July 7	Montreal	0–1	Tampa Bay		Price	18,110	1–4

Legend: Win Loss

== Player statistics ==
=== Skaters ===
Regular season
Player	GP	G	A	Pts	+/−	PIM
Tyler Toffoli	52	28	16	44	0	24
Jeff Petry	55	12	30	42	+6	20
Nick Suzuki	56	15	26	41	−5	26
Tomas Tatar	50	10	20	30	0	8
Josh Anderson	52	17	7	24	−10	38
Phillip Danault	53	5	19	24	+9	24
Brendan Gallagher	35	14	9	23	+10	16
Jonathan Drouin	44	2	21	23	−8	20
Corey Perry	49	9	12	21	−4	39
Jesperi Kotkaniemi	56	5	15	20	−1	12
Shea Weber	48	6	13	19	−4	33
Paul Byron	46	5	11	16	+5	12
Joel Armia	41	7	7	14	+10	10
Artturi Lehkonen	47	7	6	13	−2	6
Joel Edmundson	55	3	10	13	+28	25
Jake Evans	47	3	10	13	+2	29
Brett Kulak	46	2	6	8	+3	20
Ben Chiarot	41	1	6	7	−16	50
Alexander Romanov	54	1	5	6	+1	21
Cole Caufield	10	4	1	5	−1	2
Eric Staal^{†}	21	2	1	3	−10	2
Victor Mete	14	0	3	3	+3	6
Erik Gustafsson^{†}	5	0	2	2	+1	0
Alex Belzile	2	0	1	1	−1	0
Xavier Ouellet	6	0	0	0	−1	2
Otto Leskinen	1	0	0	0	0	0
Michael Frolik	8	0	0	0	−3	0
Jon Merrill^{†}	13	0	0	0	−11	4
Jesse Ylonen	1	0	0	0	0	0

Playoffs
Player	GP	G	A	Pts	+/−	PIM
Nick Suzuki	22	7	9	16	−6	2
Tyler Toffoli	22	5	9	14	−6	6
Cole Caufield	20	4	8	12	−5	0
Corey Perry	22	4	6	10	−5	25
Jesperi Kotkaniemi	19	5	3	8	−5	14
Joel Armia	21	5	3	8	−1	10
Eric Staal	21	2	6	8	−2	6
Josh Anderson	22	5	1	6	−1	12
Paul Byron	22	3	3	6	0	10
Brendan Gallagher	22	2	4	6	0	4
Shea Weber	22	1	5	6	+4	28
Jeff Petry	20	0	6	6	−2	6
Joel Edmundson	22	0	6	6	−3	10
Artturi Lehkonen	17	3	1	4	−1	4
Phillip Danault	22	1	3	4	−1	6
Erik Gustafsson	16	1	2	3	+3	0
Ben Chiarot	22	1	1	2	−6	16
Jake Evans	7	1	1	2	+3	4
Alexander Romanov	4	1	0	1	−2	0
Brett Kulak	13	0	1	1	−4	4
Tomas Tatar	5	0	1	1	−2	2
Jon Merrill	13	0	0	0	−4	0

=== Goaltenders ===
Regular season
Player	GP	GS	TOI	W	L	OT	GA	GAA	SA	SV%	SO	G	A	PIM
Carey Price	25	25	1,478:45	12	7	5	65	2.64	659	.901	1	0	0	0
Jake Allen	29	27	1,702:36	11	12	5	76	2.68	817	.907	0	0	0	2
Cayden Primeau	4	4	201:54	1	2	1	14	4.16	93	.849	0	0	0	0

Playoffs
Player	GP	GS	TOI	W	L	GA	GAA	SA	SV%	SO	G	A	PIM
Carey Price	22	22	1,341:38	13	9	51	2.28	673	.924	1	0	0	0

^{†}Denotes player spent time with another team before joining the Canadiens. Stats reflect time with the Canadiens only.
^{‡}Denotes player was traded mid-season. Stats reflect time with the Canadiens only.
Bold/italics denotes franchise record.

== Suspensions/fines ==
Player	Explanation	Length	Salary	Date issued	Ref
Joel Edmundson	Dangerous trip against Leafs forward John Tavares	N/A	$1,000.00	May 9, 2021	
Shea Weber	Cross-checking Leafs forward Wayne Simmonds	N/A	$5,000.00	May 23, 2021	
Shea Weber	Slashing Lightning forward Nikita Kucherov	N/A	$5,000.00	June 29, 2021	

== Awards and honours ==
=== Awards ===
Regular season
Player	Award	Awarded	Ref
Tyler Toffoli	NHL First Star of the Week	January 25, 2021	
Jeff Petry	NHL Third Star of the Week	February 8, 2021	

=== Milestones ===
Regular season
Player	Milestone	Reached	Ref
Alexander Romanov	1st career NHL game 1st career NHL assist 1st career NHL point	January 13, 2021	
Alexander Romanov	1st career NHL goal	January 18, 2021	
Joel Armia	300th career NHL game	January 21, 2021	
Artturi Lehkonen	300th career NHL game	February 1, 2021	
Corey Perry	800th career NHL point	February 1, 2021	
Shea Weber	1000th career NHL game	February 2, 2021	
Paul Byron	100th career NHL assist	February 25, 2021	
Jeff Petry	700th career NHL game	February 27, 2021	
Tomas Tatar	600th career NHL game	March 11, 2021	
Carey Price	700th career NHL game	March 15, 2021	
Nick Suzuki	100th career NHL game	March 17, 2021	
Jake Allen	300th career NHL game	March 19, 2021	
Jeff Petry	200th career NHL assist	March 19, 2021	
Josh Anderson	300th career NHL game	April 7, 2021	
Ben Chiarot	400th career NHL game	April 16, 2021	
Tomas Tatar	200th career NHL assist	April 21, 2021	
Cole Caufield	1st career NHL game	April 26, 2021	
Cole Caufield	1st career NHL goal 1st career NHL point	May 1, 2021	
Jon Merrill	400th career NHL game	May 3, 2021	
Alex Belzile	1st career NHL game 1st career NHL assist 1st career NHL point	May 8, 2021	
Paul Byron	200th career NHL point	May 10, 2021	
Cole Caufield	1st career NHL assist	May 12, 2021	
Jesse Ylonen	1st career NHL game	May 12, 2021	

Playoffs
Player	Milestone	Reached
Cole Caufield	1st career playoff game	May 24, 2021
Cole Caufield	1st career playoff assist 1st career playoff point	May 27, 2021
Corey Perry	100th career playoff point	May 27, 2021
Jake Evans	1st career playoff goal	June 2, 2021
Erik Gustafsson	1st career playoff goal	June 7, 2021
Alexander Romanov	1st career playoff game	June 7, 2021
Cole Caufield	1st career playoff goal	June 14, 2021
Ben Chiarot	1st career playoff goal	June 28, 2021
Alexander Romanov	1st career playoff goal 1st career playoff point	July 5, 2021

== Transactions ==
The Canadiens had been involved in the following transactions during the 2020–21 season.

=== Trades ===
Date	Details		Ref
October 6, 2020	To Columbus Blue Jackets Max Domi; 3rd-round pick in 2020	To Montreal Canadiens Josh Anderson	
October 7, 2020	To Tampa Bay Lightning STL 2nd-round pick in 2020^{1}	To Montreal Canadiens 4th-round pick in 2020; 2nd-round pick in 2021	
October 7, 2020	To San Jose Sharks ANA 4th-round pick in 2020^{2}	To Montreal Canadiens WSH 3rd-round pick in 2021^{3}	
October 7, 2020	To Chicago Blackhawks OTT 7th-round pick in 2020^{4}	To Montreal Canadiens MTL 7th-round pick in 2021^{5}	
March 26, 2021	To Buffalo Sabres 3rd-round pick in 2021; 5th-round pick in 2021	To Montreal Canadiens Eric Staal^{6}	
April 11, 2021	To Detroit Red Wings Hayden Verbeek; 5th-round pick in 2021	To Montreal Canadiens Jon Merrill	
April 12, 2021	To Philadelphia Flyers 7th-round pick in 2022	To Montreal Canadiens Erik Gustafsson^{7}	

==== Notes ====
1. The St. Louis Blues' second-round pick went to the Tampa Bay Lightning as the result of a trade on October 7, 2020, that sent a fourth-round pick in 2020 (124th overall) and a second-round pick in 2021 to Montreal in exchange for this pick.
  Montreal previously acquired this pick as the result of a trade on February 18, 2020, that sent Marco Scandella to St. Louis in exchange for a conditional fourth-round pick in 2021 and this pick.
2. The Anaheim Ducks' fourth-round pick went to the San Jose Sharks as the result of a trade on October 7, 2020, that sent Washington's third-round pick in 2021 to Montreal in exchange for this pick.
  Montreal previously acquired this pick as the result of a trade on June 30, 2019, that sent Nicolas Deslauriers to Anaheim in exchange for this pick.
3. The Washington Capitals' third-round pick went to the Montreal Canadiens as the result of a trade on October 7, 2020, that sent Anaheim's fourth-round pick in 2020 (98th overall) to San Jose in exchange for this pick.
  San Jose previously acquired this pick as the result of a trade on February 18, 2020, that sent Brenden Dillon to Washington in exchange for Colorado's second-round pick in 2020 and this pick (being conditional at the time of the trade). The condition—San Jose will receive a third-round pick in 2021 if Washington does not win the Stanley Cup in 2020—was converted when Washington was eliminated from the 2020 Stanley Cup playoffs on August 20, 2020.
4. The Ottawa Senators' seventh-round pick went to the Chicago Blackhawks as the result of a trade on October 7, 2020, that sent Montreal's seventh-round pick in 2021 to Montreal in exchange for this pick.
  Montreal previously acquired this pick as the result of a trade on February 24, 2020, that sent Matthew Peca to Ottawa in exchange for Aaron Luchuk and this pick.
5. The Montreal Canadiens' seventh-round pick went Arizona Coyotes as the result of a trade on July 24, 2021, that sent St. Louis' seventh-round pick in 2022 to Montreal in exchange for this pick.
  Montreal previously re-acquired this pick as the result of a trade on October 7, 2020, that sent Ottawa's seventh-round pick in 2020 to Chicago in exchange for this pick.
  Chicago previously acquired this pick as the result of a trade on June 30, 2019, that sent second and seventh-round picks both in 2020 and a third-round pick in 2021 to Montreal in exchange for Andrew Shaw and this pick.
6. The Buffalo Sabres will retain 50% of Staal's salary for the remainder of the 2020–21 season.
7. The Philadelphia Flyers will retain 50% of Gustafsson's salary for the remainder of the 2020–21 season.

=== Contract terminations ===
Date	Player	Via	Ref
October 6, 2020	Karl Alzner	Unconditional waivers	
December 31, 2020	Alexandre Alain	Mutual termination	

=== Waivers ===
Date	Player	Team	Ref
January 11, 2021	Noah Juulsen	to Florida Panthers	
April 12, 2021	Victor Mete	to Ottawa Senators	

=== Free agents ===
Date	Player	Team	Contract term	Ref
October 9, 2020	Brandon Baddock	from New Jersey Devils	1-year	
October 9, 2020	Max Friberg	to Frolunda HC (SHL)	3-year	
October 9, 2020	Keith Kinkaid	to New York Rangers	2-year	
October 12, 2020	Tyler Toffoli	from Vancouver Canucks	4-year	
November 23, 2020	Aaron Luchuk	to Orlando Solar Bears (ECHL)	1-year	
November 27, 2020	Antoine Waked	to Indy Fuel (ECHL)	1-year	
December 23, 2020	Michael Frolik	from Buffalo Sabres	1-year	
December 28, 2020	Corey Perry	from Dallas Stars	1-year	
December 30, 2020	Christian Folin	to Vaxjo Lakers (SHL)	1-year	
January 4, 2021	Andrew Sturtz	to Rapid City Rush (ECHL)	1-year	
April 2, 2021	Corey Schueneman	from Laval Rocket (AHL)	1-year	
May 19, 2021	Vasili Demchenko	to Avangard Omsk (KHL)	1-year	
June 15, 2021	Otto Leskinen	to Jokerit (KHL)	2-year	

=== Signings ===
Date	Player	Contract term	Ref
September 30, 2020	Michael McNiven	1-year	
October 8, 2020	Noah Juulsen	1-year	
October 8, 2020	Josh Anderson	7-year	
October 9, 2020	Victor Mete	1-year	
October 9, 2020	Xavier Ouellet	2-year	
October 14, 2020	Jake Allen	2-year	
October 14, 2020	Brendan Gallagher	6-year	
October 20, 2020	Kaiden Guhle	3-year	
March 1, 2021	Gianni Fairbrother	3-year	
March 27, 2021	Cole Caufield	3-year	
April 6, 2021	Jan Mysak	3-year	
May 12, 2021	Rafael Harvey-Pinard	2-year	
June 3, 2021	Mattias Norlinder	3-year	
June 19, 2021	Lukas Vejdemo	1-year	
June 21, 2021	Laurent Dauphin	1-year	
June 27, 2021	Brandon Baddock	1-year	

== Draft picks ==
Below are the Montreal Canadiens' selections at the 2020 NHL entry draft, which was held virtually via video conference call from the NHL Network studio in Secaucus, New Jersey on October 6–7, 2020. Originally scheduled for June 26–27, 2020 at the Bell Centre in Montreal, Quebec, the draft was subsequently postponed on March 25, 2020, due to the COVID-19 pandemic and moved to such format hereafter.

Round	#	Player	Pos	Nationality	College/Junior/Club team (League)
1	16	Kaiden Guhle	D	Canada	Prince Albert Raiders (WHL)
2	47	Luke Tuch	LW	United States	U.S. National Team Development Program (USHL)
2	48^{1}	Jan Mysak	C	Czech Republic	Hamilton Bulldogs (OHL)
4	102^{2}	Jack Smith	C	United States	St. Cloud Cathedral (USHS-MN)
4	109	Blake Biondi	C	United States	Hermantown High School (USHS-MN)
4	124^{3}	Sean Farrell	LW	United States	Chicago Steel (USHL)
5	136^{4}	Jakub Dobes	G	Czech Republic	Omaha Lancers (USHL)
6	171	Alexander Gordin	RW	Russia	SKA-1946 (MHL)

=== Notes ===
1. The Chicago Blackhawks' second-round pick will go to the Montreal Canadiens as the result of a trade on June 30, 2019, that sent Andrew Shaw and a seventh-round pick in 2021 to Chicago in exchange for a seventh-round pick in 2020, a third-round pick in 2021, and this pick.
2. The Winnipeg Jets' fourth-round pick will go to the Montreal Canadiens as the result of a trade on June 30, 2018, that sent Simon Bourque to Winnipeg in exchange for Steve Mason, Joel Armia, a seventh-round pick in 2019, and this pick.
3. The Tampa Bay Lightning's fourth-round pick will go to the Montreal Canadiens as the result of a trade on October 7, 2020, that sent St. Louis' second-round pick in 2020 to Tampa Bay in exchange for a second-round pick in 2021 and this pick.
4. The Florida Panthers' fifth-round pick will go to the Montreal Canadiens as the result of a trade on June 22, 2019, that sent Chicago's fifth-round pick in 2019 to Florida in exchange for this pick.
