= 2020–21 Toronto Maple Leafs season =

National Hockey League team season

2020–21 Toronto Maple Leafs
- North Division champions
- Division: 1st North
- 2020–21 record: 35–14–7
- Home record: 18–7–3
- Road record: 17–7–4
- Goals for: 187
- Goals against: 148

Team information
- General manager: Kyle Dubas
- Coach: Sheldon Keefe
- Captain: John Tavares
- Alternate captains: Mitch Marner; Auston Matthews; Morgan Rielly
- Arena: Scotiabank Arena
- Minor league affiliates: Toronto Marlies (AHL); Newfoundland Growlers (ECHL)

Team leaders
- Goals: Auston Matthews (41)
- Assists: Mitch Marner (47)
- Points: Mitch Marner (67)
- Penalty minutes: Zach Bogosian (49)
- Plus/minus: T. J. Brodie (+23)
- Wins: Jack Campbell (17)
- Goals against average: Jack Campbell (2.15)

The 2020–21 Toronto Maple Leafs season was the 104th season for the National Hockey League (NHL) franchise that was established on November 22, 1917.

Due to the Canada–U.S. border restrictions brought in as a result of the COVID-19 pandemic, the Maple Leafs were re-aligned with the other six Canadian franchises into the newly formed North Division. The league's 56-game season was played entirely within the new divisions, meaning that Toronto and the other Canadian teams played an all-Canadian schedule for the 2020–21 regular season as well as the first two rounds of the 2021 Stanley Cup playoffs.

The team saw tremendous success during the course of the regular season, clinching a playoff berth for the fifth year in a row on April 28 after a 4–1 win against the Montreal Canadiens, one of the first teams in the league to do so. Then on May 8, again versus Montreal, they clinched the North Division with a 3–2 win, which was their first division championship since 2000. Auston Matthews recorded a league high 41 goals, becoming the first player in team history to win the Maurice "Rocket" Richard Trophy, and was also named a finalist for the Ted Lindsay Award, given to the league's most outstanding player as voted on by players. Additionally, Mitch Marner and Matthews both finished top five in league scoring (placing fourth and fifth, respectively). The team however disappointed in the playoffs; after going up 3–1 in their First Round series against the Montreal Canadiens, Toronto was defeated in seven games. It was the fifth consecutive year that the Maple Leafs lost in the opening round of the postseason and the fourth consecutive year they were eliminated in the final, winner-take-all game.

This season was featured in the Amazon Studios All or Nothing series, released in October 2021.

== Standings ==
=== Divisional standings ===
North Division
Pos	Team	GP	W	L	OTL	RW	GF	GA	GD	Pts
1	y – Toronto Maple Leafs	56	35	14	7	29	187	148	+39	77
2	x – Edmonton Oilers	56	35	19	2	31	183	154	+29	72
3	x – Winnipeg Jets	56	30	23	3	24	170	154	+16	63
4	x – Montreal Canadiens	56	24	21	11	20	159	168	−9	59
5	Calgary Flames	56	26	27	3	22	156	161	−5	55
6	Ottawa Senators	56	23	28	5	18	157	190	−33	51
7	Vancouver Canucks	56	23	29	4	17	151	188	−37	50

Source: National Hockey League
Rules for classification: 1) Fewer number of games played (GP, only during regular season); 2) Greater number of regulation wins (RW); 3) Greater number of wins in regulation and overtime, excluding shootout wins (ROW); 4) Greater number of total wins, including shootouts (W); 5) Greater number of points earned in head-to-head play; if teams played an uneven number of head-to-head games, the result of the first game on the home ice of the team with the extra home game is discarded; 6) Greater goal differential (GD); 7) Greater number of goals scored (GF)
x – Clinched playoff spot; y – Clinched division

== Schedule and results ==
=== Regular season ===
2020–21 game log: 35–14–7, 77 points (Home: 18–7–3; Road: 17–7–4)
January: 7–2–1, 15 points (Home: 3–1–0; Road: 4–1–1)

Game	Date	Opponent	Score	OT	Decision	Location	Attendance	Record	Points	Recap
1	January 13	Montreal Canadiens	5–4	OT	Andersen (1–0–0)	Scotiabank Arena	0	1–0–0	2	
2	January 15	@ Ottawa Senators	3–5		Andersen (1–1–0)	Canadian Tire Centre	0	1–1–0	2	
3	January 16	@ Ottawa Senators	3–2		Campbell (1–0–0)	Canadian Tire Centre	0	2–1–0	4	
4	January 18	Winnipeg Jets	3–1		Andersen (2–1–0)	Scotiabank Arena	0	3–1–0	6	
5	January 20	Edmonton Oilers	1–3		Andersen (2–2–0)	Scotiabank Arena	0	3–2–0	6	
6	January 22	Edmonton Oilers	4–2		Andersen (3–2–0)	Scotiabank Arena	0	4–2–0	8	
7	January 24	@ Calgary Flames	3–2		Campbell (2–0–0)	Scotiabank Saddledome	0	5–2–0	10	
8	January 26	@ Calgary Flames	4–3		Andersen (4–2–0)	Scotiabank Saddledome	0	6–2–0	12	
9	January 28	@ Edmonton Oilers	4–3		Andersen (5–2–0)	Rogers Place	0	7–2–0	14	
10	January 30	@ Edmonton Oilers	3–4	OT	Andersen (5–2–1)	Rogers Place	0	7–2–1	15	

February: 9–2–1, 19 points (Home: 6–2–1; Road: 3–0–0)

Game	Date	Opponent	Score	OT	Decision	Location	Attendance	Record	Points	Recap
11	February 4	Vancouver Canucks	7–3		Andersen (6–2–1)	Scotiabank Arena	0	8–2–1	17	
12	February 6	Vancouver Canucks	5–1		Andersen (7–2–1)	Scotiabank Arena	0	9–2–1	19	
13	February 8	Vancouver Canucks	3–1		Andersen (8–2–1)	Scotiabank Arena	0	10–2–1	21	
14	February 10	@ Montreal Canadiens	4–2		Andersen (9–2–1)	Bell Centre	0	11–2–1	23	
15	February 13	Montreal Canadiens	1–2		Andersen (9–3–1)	Scotiabank Arena	0	11–3–1	23	
16	February 15	Ottawa Senators	5–6	OT	Andersen (9–3–2)	Scotiabank Arena	0	11–3–2	24	
17	February 17	Ottawa Senators	2–1		Andersen (10–3–2)	Scotiabank Arena	0	12–3–2	26	
18	February 18	Ottawa Senators	7–3		Hutchinson (1–0–0)	Scotiabank Arena	0	13–3–2	28	
19	February 20	@ Montreal Canadiens	5–3		Andersen (11–3–2)	Bell Centre	0	14–3–2	30	
20	February 22	Calgary Flames	0–3		Hutchinson (1–1–0)	Scotiabank Arena	0	14–4–2	30	
21	February 24	Calgary Flames	2–1	OT	Hutchinson (2–1–0)	Scotiabank Arena	0	15–4–2	32	
22	February 27	@ Edmonton Oilers	4–0		Campbell (3–0–0)	Rogers Place	0	16–4–2	34	

March: 7–6–1, 15 points (Home: 3–3–1; Road: 4–3–0)

Game	Date	Opponent	Score	OT	Decision	Location	Attendance	Record	Points	Recap
23	March 1	@ Edmonton Oilers	3–0		Hutchinson (3–1–0)	Rogers Place	0	17–4–2	36	
24	March 3	@ Edmonton Oilers	6–1		Andersen (12–3–2)	Rogers Place	0	18–4–2	38	
25	March 4	@ Vancouver Canucks	1–3		Hutchinson (3–2–0)	Rogers Arena	0	18–5–2	38	
26	March 6	@ Vancouver Canucks	2–4		Andersen (12–4–2)	Rogers Arena	0	18–6–2	38	
27	March 9	Winnipeg Jets	3–4		Andersen (12–5–2)	Scotiabank Arena	0	18–7–2	38	
28	March 11	Winnipeg Jets	4–3	OT	Andersen (13–5–2)	Scotiabank Arena	0	19–7–2	40	
29	March 13	Winnipeg Jets	2–5		Andersen (13–6–2)	Scotiabank Arena	0	19–8–2	40	
30	March 14	@ Ottawa Senators	3–4		Andersen (13–7–2)	Canadian Tire Centre	0	19–9–2	40	
31	March 19	Calgary Flames	3–4		Andersen (13–8–2)	Scotiabank Arena	0	19–10–2	40	
32	March 20	Calgary Flames	2–0		Campbell (4–0–0)	Scotiabank Arena	0	20–10–2	42	
33	March 25	@ Ottawa Senators	3–2	OT	Campbell (5–0–0)	Canadian Tire Centre	0	21–10–2	44	
34	March 27	Edmonton Oilers	4–3	OT	Campbell (6–0–0)	Scotiabank Arena	0	22–10–2	46	
35	March 29	Edmonton Oilers	2–3	OT	Hutchinson (3–2–1)	Scotiabank Arena	0	22–10–3	47	
36	March 31	@ Winnipeg Jets	3–1		Campbell (7–0–0)	Bell MTS Place	0	23–10–3	49	

April: 9–3–2, 20 points (Home: 3–1–1; Road: 6–2–1)

Game	Date	Opponent	Score	OT	Decision	Location	Attendance	Record	Points	Recap
37	April 2	@ Winnipeg Jets	2–1	SO	Campbell (8–0–0)	Bell MTS Place	0	24–10–3	51	
38	April 4	@ Calgary Flames	4–2		Hutchinson (4–2–1)	Scotiabank Saddledome	0	25–10–3	53	
39	April 5	@ Calgary Flames	5–3		Campbell (9–0–0)	Scotiabank Saddledome	0	26–10–3	55	
40	April 7	Montreal Canadiens	3–2		Campbell (10–0–0)	Scotiabank Arena	0	27–10–3	57	
41	April 10	Ottawa Senators	6–5		Campbell (11–0–0)	Scotiabank Arena	0	28–10–3	59	
42	April 12	@ Montreal Canadiens	2–4		Campbell (11–1–0)	Bell Centre	0	28–11–3	59	
43	April 13	Calgary Flames	2–3	OT	Rittich (0–0–1)	Scotiabank Arena	0	28–11–4	60	
44	April 15	Winnipeg Jets	2–5		Campbell (11–2–0)	Scotiabank Arena	0	28–12–4	60	
—	April 17	@ Vancouver Canucks	–	Postponed due to COVID-19. Rescheduled for April 18.						
45	April 18	@ Vancouver Canucks	2–3	OT	Campbell (11–2–1)	Rogers Arena	0	28–12–5	61	
—	April 19	@ Vancouver Canucks	–	Postponed due to COVID-19. Rescheduled for April 20.						
46	April 20	@ Vancouver Canucks	3–6		Rittich (0–1–1)	Rogers Arena	0	28–13–5	61	
47	April 22	@ Winnipeg Jets	5–3		Campbell (12–2–1)	Bell MTS Place	0	29–13–5	63	
48	April 24	@ Winnipeg Jets	4–1		Campbell (13–2–1)	Bell MTS Place	0	30–13–5	65	
49	April 28	@ Montreal Canadiens	4–1		Campbell (14–2–1)	Bell Centre	0	31–13–5	67	
50	April 29	Vancouver Canucks	4–1		Rittich (1–1–1)	Scotiabank Arena	0	32–13–5	69	

May: 3–1–2, 8 points (Home: 3–0–0; Road: 0–1–2)

Game	Date	Opponent	Score	OT	Decision	Location	Attendance	Record	Points	Recap
51	May 1	Vancouver Canucks	5–1		Campbell (15–2–1)	Scotiabank Arena	0	33–13–5	71	
52	May 3	@ Montreal Canadiens	2–3	OT	Campbell (15–2–2)	Bell Centre	0	33–13–6	72	
53	May 6	Montreal Canadiens	5–2		Campbell (16–2–2)	Scotiabank Arena	0	34–13–6	74	
54	May 8	Montreal Canadiens	3–2		Campbell (17–2–2)	Scotiabank Arena	0	35–13–6	76	
55	May 12	@ Ottawa Senators	3–4	OT	Andersen (13–8–3)	Canadian Tire Centre	0	35–13–7	77	
56	May 14	@ Winnipeg Jets	2–4		Campbell (17–3–2)	Bell MTS Place	0	35–14–7	77	

2020–21 schedule

Win (2 Points) Loss (0 points) Overtime/shootout loss (1 point)

=== Playoffs ===
2021 Stanley Cup playoffs
North Division First Round vs. (N4) Montreal Canadiens: Montreal won 4–3

Game	Date	Opponent	Score	OT	Decision	Location	Attendance	Series	Recap
1	May 20	Montreal Canadiens	1–2		Campbell (0–1)	Scotiabank Arena	0	0–1	
2	May 22	Montreal Canadiens	5–1		Campbell (1–1)	Scotiabank Arena	0	1–1	
3	May 24	@ Montreal Canadiens	2–1		Campbell (2–1)	Bell Centre	0	2–1	
4	May 25	@ Montreal Canadiens	4–0		Campbell (3–1)	Bell Centre	0	3–1	
5	May 27	Montreal Canadiens	3–4	OT	Campbell (3–2)	Scotiabank Arena	0	3–2	
6	May 29	@ Montreal Canadiens	2–3	OT	Campbell (3–3)	Bell Centre	5,112 (Note: Spectators were in attendance, but the exact number was not reported.)	3–3	
7	May 31	Montreal Canadiens	1–3		Campbell (3–4)	Scotiabank Arena	550 (Note: Approximately 550 health care workers were in attendance, but the exact number was not reported.)	3–4	

Win Loss

== Player statistics ==
=== Skaters ===
Regular season
Player	GP	G	A	Pts	+/−	PIM
Mitch Marner	55	20	47	67	21	20
Auston Matthews	52	41	25	66	21	10
John Tavares	56	19	31	50	12	14
William Nylander	51	17	25	42	10	16
Morgan Rielly	55	5	30	35	11	14
Zach Hyman	43	15	18	33	19	28
Jason Spezza	54	10	20	30	3	6
Jake Muzzin	53	4	23	27	21	29
Alexander Kerfoot	56	8	15	23	2	12
Joe Thornton	44	5	15	20	6	14
Justin Holl	55	2	18	20	16	25
Ilya Mikheyev	54	7	10	17	5	6
T. J. Brodie	56	1	13	14	23	12
Pierre Engvall	42	7	5	12	2	16
Alex Galchenyuk^{(p)}	26	4	8	12	−2	14
Wayne Simmonds	38	7	2	9	−3	45
Travis Boyd^{(X)}	20	3	5	8	1	2
Jimmy Vesey^{(X)}	30	5	2	7	−4	4
Travis Dermott	51	2	4	6	−1	19
Adam Brooks	11	4	1	5	4	0
Zach Bogosian	45	0	4	4	7	49
Rasmus Sandin	9	0	4	4	6	0
Nick Foligno^{(p)}	7	0	4	4	5	4
Mikko Lehtonen^{(X)}	9	0	3	3	1	4
Nicholas Robertson	6	0	1	1	1	0
Alexander Barabanov^{(X)}	13	0	1	1	1	4
Nic Petan^{(M)}	7	0	1	1	−2	4
Scott Sabourin	1	0	0	0	0	5
Kenny Agostino^{(M)}	1	0	0	0	0	0
Timothy Liljegren	2	0	0	0	1	2
Ben Hutton^{(p)}	4	0	0	0	0	0
Stefan Noesen^{(p)}	1	0	0	0	0	0
Joey Anderson^{(M)}	1	0	0	0	1	2

Playoffs
Player	GP	G	A	Pts	+/−	PIM
William Nylander	7	5	3	8	3	4
Alexander Kerfoot	7	1	5	6	3	4
Jason Spezza	7	3	2	5	3	4
Auston Matthews	7	1	4	5	2	0
Alex Galchenyuk^{(p)}	6	1	3	4	2	4
Mitch Marner	7	0	4	4	1	4
Jake Muzzin	6	2	1	3	2	0
Morgan Rielly	7	1	2	3	3	0
T. J. Brodie	7	1	1	2	5	4
Zach Hyman	7	1	0	1	2	4
Joe Thornton	7	1	0	1	−3	2
Rasmus Sandin	5	1	0	1	−3	0
Zach Bogosian	7	0	1	1	−3	0
Justin Holl	7	0	1	1	5	4
Wayne Simmonds	7	0	1	1	0	2
Pierre Engvall	6	0	1	1	−1	12
Nick Foligno^{(p)}	4	0	1	1	2	5
Ilya Mikheyev	7	0	0	0	0	0
Travis Dermott	3	0	0	0	−1	0
Adam Brooks	2	0	0	0	−1	2
John Tavares	1	0	0	0	0	0
Riley Nash^{(p)}	2	0	0	0	0	0

=== Goaltenders ===
Regular season
Player	GP	GS	TOI	W	L	OTL	GA	GAA	SA	SV%	SO	G	A	PIM
Jack Campbell	22	22	1,284:24	17	3	2	46	2.15	585	.921	2	0	0	0
Frederik Andersen	24	23	1,420:07	13	8	3	70	2.96	668	.895	0	0	1	0
Michael Hutchinson	8	8	421:52	4	2	1	17	2.42	211	.919	1	0	0	0
David Rittich^{(p)}	4	3	220:41	1	1	1	10	2.72	89	.888	0	0	0	0

Playoffs
Player	GP	GS	TOI	W	L	GA	GAA	SA	SV%	SO	G	A	PIM
Jack Campbell	7	7	430:51	3	4	13	1.81	197	.934	1	0	0	0

^{(M)} Player currently playing for the minor league affiliate Toronto Marlies of the AHL
^{(X)} Player is no longer with the Maple Leafs organization
^{(p)} Player previously played with another team in the current season before being acquired by Toronto
Bold/italics denotes franchise record.

== Transactions ==
The Maple Leafs have been involved in the following transactions during the 2020–21 season.

=== Trades ===
Date	Details		Ref
October 10, 2020	To New Jersey Devils Andreas Johnsson	To Toronto Maple Leafs Joey Anderson	
February 15, 2021	To Carolina Hurricanes Egor Korshkov; David Warsofsky	To Toronto Maple Leafs Alex Galchenyuk	
March 12, 2021	To Columbus Blue Jackets Mikko Lehtonen	To Toronto Maple Leafs Veini Vehvilainen	
April 9, 2021	To Columbus Blue Jackets Conditional 7th-round pick in 2022	To Toronto Maple Leafs Riley Nash	
April 11, 2021	To Columbus Blue Jackets 1st-round pick in 2021; 4th-round pick in 2022	To Toronto Maple Leafs Nick Foligno	
April 11, 2021	To San Jose Sharks 4th-round pick in 2021	To Toronto Maple Leafs Stefan Noesen	
April 11, 2021	To Calgary Flames 3rd-round pick in 2022	To Toronto Maple Leafs David Rittich	
April 12, 2021	To San Jose Sharks Alexander Barabanov	To Toronto Maple Leafs Antti Suomela	
April 12, 2021	To Anaheim Ducks 5th-round pick in 2022	To Toronto Maple Leafs Ben Hutton	

=== Free agents signed ===
Date	Player	Team	Contract term	Ref
October 9, 2020	Wayne Simmonds	Buffalo Sabres	1-year	
October 9, 2020	T. J. Brodie	Calgary Flames	4-year	
October 10, 2020	Travis Boyd	Washington Capitals	1-year	
October 10, 2020	Zach Bogosian	Tampa Bay Lightning	1-year	
October 11, 2020	Jimmy Vesey	Buffalo Sabres	1-year	
October 13, 2020	Aaron Dell	San Jose Sharks	1-year	
October 16, 2020	Joe Thornton	San Jose Sharks	1-year	
October 30, 2020	Michael Hutchinson	Colorado Avalanche	2-year	
February 7, 2021	Scott Sabourin	Toronto Marlies	1-year	
March 28, 2021	Alex Steeves	Notre Dame Fighting Irish	3-year	

=== Free agents lost ===
Date	Player	Team	Contract term	Ref

=== Waivers ===
Date	Player	Team	Ref
January 18, 2021	Aaron Dell	to New Jersey Devils	
March 17, 2021	Jimmy Vesey	to Vancouver Canucks	
March 23, 2021	Travis Boyd	to Vancouver Canucks	

=== Signings ===
Date	Player	Contract term	Ref
October 2, 2020	Denis Malgin	1-year	
October 5, 2020	Jason Spezza	1-year	
October 20, 2020	Ilya Mikheyev	2-year	
October 23, 2020	Travis Dermott	1-year	
October 30, 2020	Joey Anderson	3-year	
April 15, 2021	Rodion Amirov	3-year	

== Draft picks ==
Below are the Toronto Maple Leafs' selections at the 2020 NHL entry draft, which was originally scheduled for June 26–27, 2020 at the Bell Center in Montreal, but was postponed on March 25, 2020, due to the COVID-19 pandemic. It was held October 6–7, 2020 virtually via video conference call from the NHL Network studio in Secaucus, New Jersey.

The Leafs held on to three of their own seven picks (rounds 4, 5, 6). In June 2019 they had traded way their first and seventh round picks along with Patrick Marleau to the Carolina Hurricanes mainly to clear cap space. On draft day they exchanged their second round pick for two lower picks from the Ottawa Senators. Their third round pick went to the Colorado Avalanche in July 2019 in the Nazem Kadri for Tyson Barrie and Alexander Kerfoot trade. They acquired an additional nine picks this year through various trades.

Round	#	Player	Pos	Nationality	College/Junior/Club team (League)
1^{1}	15	Rodion Amirov	C	Russia	Salavat Yulaev Ufa (KHL)
2^{2}	59	Roni Hirvonen	C	Finland	Ässät (Liiga)
3^{3}	64	Topi Niemela	D	Finland	Oulun Kärpät (Liiga)
4	106	Artur Akhtyamov	G	Russia	Irbis Kazan (MHL)
4^{4}	122	Willam Villeneuve	D	Canada	Saint John Sea Dogs (QMJHL)
5^{5}	137	Dmitri Ovchinnikov	C	Russia	Novosibirsk 2 (Junior Hockey League (Russia) (MHL)
6	168	Veeti Miettinen	RW	Finland	K-Espoo U20 (Jr. A SM-liiga)
6^{6}	177	Axel Rindell	D	Finland	Jukurit (Liiga)
6^{7}	180	Joe Miller	C	United States	Chicago Steel (USHL)
7^{8}	189	John Fusco	D	United States	Harvard Crimson (ECAC)
7^{9}	195	Wyatt Schingoethe	C	United States	Waterloo Black Hawks (USHL)
7^{10}	213	Ryan Tverberg	C	Canada	Toronto Jr. Canadiens (OJHL)

=== Notes ===
1. The Pittsburgh Penguins' first-round pick went to the Toronto Maple Leafs as the result of a trade on August 25, 2020, that sent Kasperi Kapanen, Pontus Aberg and Jesper Lindgren to Pittsburgh in exchange for Evan Rodrigues, Filip Hallander, David Warsofsky and this pick.
2. The New York Islanders' second-round pick went to the Toronto Maple Leafs as the result of a trade on October 7, 2020, that sent a 2020 second-round pick (44th overall) to Ottawa in exchange for a 2020 third-round pick (64th overall) and this pick.
  Ottawa previously acquired this pick as the result of a trade on February 24, 2020, that sent Jean-Gabriel Pageau to New York in exchange for a conditional 2020 first-round pick, a conditional third-round pick in 2022 and this pick.
3. The Ottawa Senators' third-round pick went to the Toronto Maple Leafs as the result of a trade on October 7, 2020, that sent a 2020 second-round pick (44th overall) to Ottawa in exchange for the Islanders' 2020 second-round pick (59th overall) and this pick.
4. The Vegas Golden Knights' fourth-round pick went to the Toronto Maple Leafs as the result of a trade on July 23, 2019, that sent Garret Sparks to Vegas in exchange for David Clarkson and this pick.
5. The Toronto Maple Leafs' fifth-round pick was re-acquired as the result of a trade on October 7, 2020, that sent Vegas' fifth-round pick and St. Louis' seventh-round pick both in 2020 (153rd and 212th overall) to Florida in exchange for this pick.
  Florida previously acquired this pick as the result of a trade on December 29, 2018, that sent Michael Hutchinson to Toronto in exchange for this pick.
6. The Carolina Hurricanes' sixth-round pick went to the Toronto Maple Leafs as the result of a trade on June 22, 2019, that sent Patrick Marleau, a conditional 2020 first-round pick and a 2020 seventh-round pick to Carolina in exchange for this pick.
7. The Colorado Avalanche's sixth-round pick went to the Toronto Maple Leafs as the result of a trade on July 1, 2019, that sent Nazem Kadri, Calle Rosén and a 2020 third-round pick to Colorado in exchange for Tyson Barrie, Alexander Kerfoot and this pick.
8. The San Jose Sharks' seventh-round pick went to the Toronto Maple Leafs as the result of a trade on February 20, 2018, that sent Eric Fehr to San Jose in exchange for this pick.
9. The Winnipeg Jets' seventh-round pick went to the Toronto Maple Leafs as the result of a trade on May 30, 2019, that sent Fedor Gordeev to Minnesota in exchange for this pick (being conditional at the time of the trade). The condition – Toronto will receive Winnipeg's 2020 seventh-round pick if Gordeev signs with the Wild before June 1, 2019 – was converted on May 30, 2019.
  Minnesota previously acquired this pick as the result of a trade on February 25, 2019, that sent Matt Hendricks to Winnipeg in exchange for this pick.
10. The Boston Bruins' seventh-round pick went to the Toronto Maple Leafs as the result of a trade on October 7, 2020, that sent a seventh-round pick in 2021 to Boston in exchange for this pick.
