= 2020–21 Edmonton Oilers season =

Season of play of professional ice hockey team

2020–21 Edmonton Oilers
- Division: 2nd North
- 2020–21 record: 35–19–2
- Home record: 16–12–0
- Road record: 19–7–2
- Goals for: 183
- Goals against: 154

Team information
- General manager: Ken Holland
- Coach: Dave Tippett
- Captain: Connor McDavid
- Alternate captains: Leon Draisaitl; Adam Larsson; Ryan Nugent-Hopkins; Darnell Nurse
- Arena: Rogers Place
- Minor league affiliates: Bakersfield Condors (AHL); Wichita Thunder (ECHL)

Team leaders
- Goals: Connor McDavid (33)
- Assists: Connor McDavid (72)
- Points: Connor McDavid (105)
- Penalty minutes: Darnell Nurse (57)
- Plus/minus: Leon Draisaitl (+29)
- Wins: Mike Smith (21)
- Goals against average: Mike Smith (2.31)

The 2020–21 Edmonton Oilers season was the 42nd season for the National Hockey League (NHL) franchise that was established on June 22, 1979, and 49th season overall, including their play in the World Hockey Association (WHA). The Oilers made the playoffs for the second straight year after being eliminated by the Chicago Blackhawks in the qualifying round of the 2020 Stanley Cup playoffs.

Due to the Canada–U.S. border restrictions brought in as a result of the COVID-19 pandemic, the Oilers were re-aligned with the other six Canadian franchises into the newly formed North Division. The league's 56-game season was played entirely within the new divisions, meaning Edmonton and the other Canadian teams had an all-Canadian schedule for the 2020–21 regular season and the first two rounds of the 2021 Stanley Cup playoffs.

On May 3, 2021, the Oilers clinched a playoff berth after they defeated the Vancouver Canucks 5–3. They were swept in the first round by the Winnipeg Jets, with a 4-3 triple overtime loss in game four on May 24.

== Standings ==
=== Divisional standings ===
North Division
Pos	Team	GP	W	L	OTL	RW	GF	GA	GD	Pts
1	y – Toronto Maple Leafs	56	35	14	7	29	187	148	+39	77
2	x – Edmonton Oilers	56	35	19	2	31	183	154	+29	72
3	x – Winnipeg Jets	56	30	23	3	24	170	154	+16	63
4	x – Montreal Canadiens	56	24	21	11	20	159	168	−9	59
5	Calgary Flames	56	26	27	3	22	156	161	−5	55
6	Ottawa Senators	56	23	28	5	18	157	190	−33	51
7	Vancouver Canucks	56	23	29	4	17	151	188	−37	50

Source: National Hockey League
Rules for classification: 1) Fewer number of games played (GP, only during regular season); 2) Greater number of regulation wins (RW); 3) Greater number of wins in regulation and overtime, excluding shootout wins (ROW); 4) Greater number of total wins, including shootouts (W); 5) Greater number of points earned in head-to-head play; if teams played an uneven number of head-to-head games, the result of the first game on the home ice of the team with the extra home game is discarded; 6) Greater goal differential (GD); 7) Greater number of goals scored (GF)
x – Clinched playoff spot; y – Clinched division

== Schedule and results ==
=== Regular season ===
The regular season schedule was published on December 23, 2020.

2020–21 game log

January: 5–6–0 (Home: 3–4–0; Road: 2–2–0)
#	Date	Visitor	Score	Home	OT	Decision	Attendance	Record	Pts	Recap
1	January 13	Vancouver	5–3	Edmonton		Koskinen	0	0–1–0	0
2	January 14	Vancouver	2–5	Edmonton		Koskinen	0	1–1–0	2
3	January 16	Montreal	5–1	Edmonton		Koskinen	0	1–2–0	2
4	January 18	Montreal	3–1	Edmonton		Koskinen	0	1–3–0	2
5	January 20	Edmonton	3–1	Toronto		Koskinen	0	2–3–0	4
6	January 22	Edmonton	2–4	Toronto		Koskinen	0	2–4–0	4
7	January 24	Edmonton	4–3	Winnipeg		Koskinen	0	3–4–0	6
8	January 26	Edmonton	4–6	Winnipeg		Koskinen	0	3–5–0	6
9	January 28	Toronto	4–3	Edmonton		Koskinen	0	3–6–0	6
10	January 30	Toronto	3–4	Edmonton	OT	Koskinen	0	4–6–0	8
11	January 31	Ottawa	5–8	Edmonton		Skinner	0	5–6–0	10

February: 9–3–0 (Home: 3–2–0; Road: 6–1–0)
#	Date	Visitor	Score	Home	OT	Decision	Attendance	Record	Pts	Recap
12	February 2	Ottawa	2–4	Edmonton		Koskinen	0	6–6–0	12
13	February 6	Edmonton	4–6	Calgary		Koskinen	0	6–7–0	12
14	February 8	Edmonton	3–1	Ottawa		Smith	0	7–7–0	14
15	February 9	Edmonton	3–2	Ottawa		Koskinen	0	8–7–0	16
16	February 11	Edmonton	3–0	Montreal		Smith	0	9–7–0	18
17	February 15	Winnipeg	6–5	Edmonton		Koskinen	0	9–8–0	18
18	February 17	Winnipeg	2–3	Edmonton		Smith	0	10–8–0	20
19	February 19	Edmonton	2–1	Calgary		Smith	0	11–8–0	22
20	February 20	Calgary	1–7	Edmonton		Koskinen	0	12–8–0	24
21	February 23	Edmonton	4–3	Vancouver		Smith	0	13–8–0	26
22	February 25	Edmonton	3–0	Vancouver		Smith	0	14–8–0	28
23	February 27	Toronto	4–0	Edmonton		Smith	0	14–9–0	28

March: 8–5–1 (Home: 6–2–0; Road: 2–3–1)
#	Date	Visitor	Score	Home	OT	Decision	Attendance	Record	Pts	Recap
24	March 1	Toronto	3–0	Edmonton		Koskinen	0	14–10–0	28
25	March 3	Toronto	6–1	Edmonton		Smith	0	14–11–0	28
26	March 6	Calgary	2–3	Edmonton		Smith	0	15–11–0	30
27	March 8	Ottawa	2–3	Edmonton		Koskinen	0	16–11–0	32
28	March 10	Ottawa	1–7	Edmonton		Smith	0	17–11–0	34
29	March 12	Ottawa	2–6	Edmonton		Smith	0	18–11–0	36
30	March 13	Edmonton	1–2	Vancouver		Koskinen	0	18–12–0	36
31	March 15	Edmonton	3–4	Calgary		Smith	0	18–13–0	36
32	March 17	Edmonton	7–3	Calgary		Smith	0	19–13–0	38
33	March 18	Winnipeg	1–2	Edmonton		Koskinen	0	20–13–0	40
34	March 20	Winnipeg	2–4	Edmonton		Smith	0	21–13–0	42
—	March 22	Edmonton		Montreal	Postponed due to COVID-19. Rescheduled for March 30.
—	March 24	Edmonton		Montreal	Postponed due to COVID-19. Rescheduled for May 10.
—	March 26	Edmonton		Montreal	Postponed due to COVID-19. Rescheduled for May 12.
35	March 27	Edmonton	3–4	Toronto	OT	Smith	0	21–13–1	43
36	March 29	Edmonton	3–2	Toronto	OT	Smith	0	22–13–1	45
37	March 30	Edmonton	0–4	Montreal		Koskinen	0	22–14–1	45

April: 7–3–1 (Home: 2–1–0; Road: 5–1–1)
#	Date	Visitor	Score	Home	OT	Decision	Attendance	Record	Pts	Recap
38	April 2	Calgary	2–3	Edmonton		Smith	0	23–14–1	47
—	April 3	Vancouver		Edmonton	Postponed due to COVID-19. Rescheduled for May 6.
39	April 5	Edmonton	2–3	Montreal	OT	Smith	0	23–14–2	48
40	April 7	Edmonton	4–2	Ottawa		Koskinen	0	24–14–2	50
41	April 8	Edmonton	3–1	Ottawa		Smith	0	25–14–2	52
42	April 10	Edmonton	0–5	Calgary		Smith	0	25–15–2	52
—	April 12	Vancouver		Edmonton	Postponed due to COVID-19. Rescheduled for May 8.
—	April 14	Vancouver		Edmonton	Postponed due to COVID-19. Rescheduled for May 15.
—	April 16	Edmonton		Vancouver	Postponed due to COVID-19. Rescheduled for May 3.
43	April 17	Edmonton	3–0	Winnipeg		Smith	0	26–15–2	54
44	April 19	Montreal	1–4	Edmonton		Smith	0	27–15–2	56
45	April 21	Montreal	4–3	Edmonton		Smith	0	27–16–2	56
46	April 26	Edmonton	6–1	Winnipeg		Smith	0	28–16–2	58
47	April 28	Edmonton	3–1	Winnipeg		Koskinen	0	29–16–2	60
48	April 29	Calgary	3–1	Edmonton		Smith	0	29–17–2	60

May: 6–2–0 (Home: 2–2–0; Road: 4–0–0)
#	Date	Visitor	Score	Home	OT	Decision	Attendance	Record	Pts	Recap
49	May 1	Calgary	1–4	Edmonton		Smith	0	30–17–2	62
50	May 3	Edmonton	5–3	Vancouver		Koskinen	0	31–17–2	64
51	May 4	Edmonton	4–1	Vancouver		Smith	0	32–17–2	66
52	May 6	Vancouver	6–3	Edmonton		Koskinen	0	32–18–2	66
53	May 8	Vancouver	3–4	Edmonton		Smith	0	33–18–2	68
54	May 10	Edmonton	4–3	Montreal	OT	Koskinen	0	34–18–2	70
55	May 12	Edmonton	4–3	Montreal	OT	Smith	0	35–18–2	72
56	May 15	Vancouver	4–1	Edmonton		Koskinen	0	35–19–2	72

Legend: Win (2 points) Loss (0 points) Overtime/shootout loss (1 point)

=== Playoffs ===
2021 Stanley Cup playoffs

North Division first round vs. (N3) Winnipeg Jets: Winnipeg won 4–0
#	Date	Visitor	Score	Home	OT	Decision	Series	Recap
1	May 19	Winnipeg	4–1	Edmonton		Smith	0–1
2	May 21	Winnipeg	1–0	Edmonton	OT	Smith	0–2
3	May 23	Edmonton	4–5	Winnipeg	OT	Smith	0–3
4	May 24	Edmonton	3–4	Winnipeg	3OT	Smith	0–4

Legend: Win Loss

== Player statistics ==
=== Skaters ===
Regular season
Player	GP	G	A	Pts	+/−	PIM
Connor McDavid	56	33	72	105	+21	20
Leon Draisaitl	56	31	53	84	+29	22
Tyson Barrie	56	8	40	48	+4	10
Darnell Nurse	56	16	20	36	+27	57
Ryan Nugent-Hopkins	52	16	19	35	−4	22
Jesse Puljujarvi	55	15	10	25	+6	16
Kailer Yamamoto	52	8	13	21	+9	26
Alex Chiasson	45	9	7	16	−10	33
Dominik Kahun	48	9	6	15	−3	2
Josh Archibald	52	7	6	13	+2	37
Jujhar Khaira	40	3	8	11	−1	42
James Neal	29	5	5	10	−2	11
Adam Larsson	56	4	6	10	+2	24
Devin Shore	38	5	4	9	−4	6
Tyler Ennis	30	3	6	9	0	6
Kris Russell	35	0	9	9	0	8
Ethan Bear	43	2	6	8	−1	14
Zack Kassian	27	2	3	5	−4	15
Kyle Turris	27	2	3	5	−11	10
Evan Bouchard	14	2	3	5	−2	2
Caleb Jones	33	0	4	4	−7	6
Gaetan Haas	34	2	1	3	−6	10
Patrick Russell	8	0	2	2	0	0
William Lagesson	19	0	2	2	0	9
Dmitri Kulikov^{†}	10	0	2	2	+1	2
Slater Koekkoek	18	1	0	1	−7	2
Ryan McLeod	10	0	1	1	−2	0
Joakim Nygard	9	0	0	0	−2	4

Playoffs
Player	GP	G	A	Pts	+/−	PIM
Leon Draisaitl	4	2	3	5	−2	2
Connor McDavid	4	1	3	4	−2	0
Ryan Nugent-Hopkins	4	1	1	2	−2	0
Zack Kassian	4	1	1	2	0	0
Jesse Puljujarvi	4	1	1	2	0	0
Adam Larsson	4	0	2	2	−4	2
Jujhar Khaira	4	1	0	1	−2	6
Alex Chiasson	3	1	0	1	−2	0
Devin Shore	2	0	1	1	−2	0
Slater Koekkoek	4	0	1	1	0	0
Darnell Nurse	4	0	1	1	0	2
Tyson Barrie	4	0	1	1	+1	0
Kailer Yamamoto	4	0	1	1	−2	2
Josh Archibald	3	0	0	0	−1	2
Tyler Ennis	2	0	0	0	0	0
Kris Russell	1	0	0	0	0	0
James Neal	2	0	0	0	−1	0
Ethan Bear	4	0	0	0	−4	2
Dmitri Kulikov	3	0	0	0	−3	0
Ryan McLeod	4	0	0	0	−1	0
Dominik Kahun	2	0	0	0	0	0
Gaetan Haas	2	0	0	0	0	4

=== Goaltenders ===
Regular season
Player	GP	GS	TOI	W	L	OT	GA	GAA	SA	SV%	SO	G	A	PIM
Mike Smith	32	30	1,846:33	21	6	2	71	2.31	921	.923	3	0	2	6
Mikko Koskinen	26	25	1,437:39	13	13	0	76	3.17	756	.899	0	0	2	0
Stuart Skinner	1	1	59:41	1	0	0	5	5.03	38	.868	0	0	0	0

Playoffs
Player	GP	GS	TOI	W	L	GA	GAA	SA	SV%	SO	G	A	PIM
Mike Smith	4	4	299:48	0	4	12	2.40	136	.912	0	0	0	0

^{†}Denotes player spent time with another team before joining the Oilers. Stats reflect time with the Oilers only.
^{‡}Denotes player was traded mid-season. Stats reflect time with the Oilers only.

== Awards and honours ==
=== Milestones ===
Regular season
Player	Milestone	Reached
Mikko Koskinen	100th NHL game	January 16, 2021
Stuart Skinner	1st NHL game 1st NHL win	January 31, 2021
William Lagesson	1st NHL assist 1st NHL point	February 6, 2021
Mike Smith	40th NHL shutout	February 11, 2021
Connor McDavid	500th NHL point	February 17, 2021
Dave Tippett	600th NHL win (coach)	February 17, 2021
Darnell Nurse	100th NHL assist	February 19, 2021

== Transactions ==
The Oilers have been involved in the following transactions during the 2020–21 season.

=== Trades ===
Date	Details		Ref
October 7, 2020	To San Jose Sharks 3rd-round pick in 2020	To Edmonton Oilers 4th-round pick in 2020; 5th-round pick in 2020	
April 12, 2021	To New Jersey Devils 4th-round pick in 2022	To Edmonton Oilers Dmitri Kulikov	
July 12, 2021	To Chicago Blackhawks Caleb Jones; Conditional 3rd-round pick in 2022	To Edmonton Oilers Duncan Keith; Tim Söderlund	
July 14, 2021	To Carolina Hurricanes Dylan Wells	To Edmonton Oilers Future considerations	

=== Free agents ===
Date	Player	Team	Contract term	Ref
October 9, 2020	Matt Benning	to Nashville Predators	2-year	
October 9, 2020	Josh Currie	to Pittsburgh Penguins	1-year	
October 9, 2020	Anton Forsberg	from Carolina Hurricanes	1-year	
October 9, 2020	Seth Griffith	from Winnipeg Jets	2-year	
October 9, 2020	Tomas Jurco	to Vegas Golden Knights	1-year	
October 9, 2020	Alan Quine	from Calgary Flames	1-year	
October 9, 2020	Kyle Turris	from Nashville Predators	2-year	
October 10, 2020	Tyson Barrie	from Toronto Maple Leafs	1-year	
October 12, 2020	Logan Day	to Lehigh Valley Phantoms (AHL)	1-year	
October 20, 2020	Shane Starrett	to Wilkes-Barre/Scranton Penguins (AHL)	1-year	
November 2, 2020	Dominik Kahun	from Buffalo Sabres	1-year	
November 17, 2020	Cameron Hebig	to Florida Everblades (ECHL)	1-year	
December 26, 2020	Slater Koekkoek	from Chicago Blackhawks	1-year	
December 28, 2020	Andreas Athanasiou	to Los Angeles Kings	1-year	
December 28, 2020	Ryan Kuffner	to ERC Ingolstadt (DEL)	1-year	
January 8, 2021	Riley Sheahan	to Buffalo Sabres	1-year	
January 11, 2021	Keegan Lowe	to San Diego Gulls (AHL)	1-year	
January 13, 2021	Devin Shore	from Columbus Blue Jackets	1-year	
May 28, 2021	Joakim Nygård	to Färjestad BK (SHL)	6-year	
June 3, 2021	Adam Cracknell	to Bakersfield Condors (AHL)	1-year	
June 10, 2021	Gaëtan Haas	to EHC Biel (NL)	5-year	

=== Waivers ===
Date	Player	Team	Ref
January 12, 2021	Anton Forsberg	to Carolina Hurricanes	
January 16, 2021	Troy Grosenick	from Los Angeles Kings	
February 6, 2021	Troy Grosenick	to Los Angeles Kings	
March 1, 2021	Alex Stalock	from Minnesota Wild	

=== Signings ===
Date	Player	Contract term	Ref
October 7, 2020	Jesse Puljujarvi	2-year	
October 9, 2020	Tyler Ennis	1-year	
October 9, 2020	Kris Russell	1-year	
October 9, 2020	Mike Smith	1-year	
November 4, 2020	William Lagesson	2-year	
November 25, 2020	Philip Kemp	3-year	
December 28, 2020	Ethan Bear	2-year	
March 22, 2021	Michael Kesselring	3-year	
April 16, 2021	Dylan Holloway	3-year	
May 3, 2021	Ilya Konovalov	2-year	
June 9, 2021	Devin Shore	2-year	
June 29, 2021	Ryan Nugent-Hopkins	8-year	

== Draft picks ==
Below are the Edmonton Oilers' selections at the 2020 NHL entry draft, which was originally scheduled for June 26–27, 2020 at the Bell Center in Montreal, Quebec, but was postponed on March 25, 2020, due to the COVID-19 pandemic. The draft was held October 6–7, 2020 virtually via Video conference call from the NHL Network studio in Secaucus, New Jersey.

Round	#	Player	Pos	Nationality	College/Junior/Club team (League)
1	14	Dylan Holloway	C	Canada	University of Wisconsin (WCHA)
4	100	Carter Savoie	LW	Canada	Sherwood Park Crusaders (AJHL)
5	126	Tyler Tullio	C/RW	Canada	Oshawa Generals (OHL)
5	138	Maxim Beryozkin	LW	Russia	Lokomotiv Yaroslavl (KHL)
6	169	Filip Engaras	C	Sweden	University of New Hampshire (Hockey East)
7	200	Jeremias Lindewall	LW	Sweden	Modo Hockey (HockeyAllsvenskan)
