= 2020–21 Calgary Flames season =

Season of play of professional ice hockey team

2020–21 Calgary Flames
- Division: 5th North
- 2020–21 record: 26–27–3
- Home record: 15–12–1
- Road record: 11–15–2
- Goals for: 156
- Goals against: 161

Team information
- General manager: Brad Treliving
- Coach: Geoff Ward (Jan. 14 – Mar. 4); Darryl Sutter (Mar. 4 – May 19)
- Captain: Mark Giordano
- Alternate captains: Mikael Backlund; Sean Monahan; Matthew Tkachuk
- Arena: Scotiabank Saddledome
- Minor league affiliates: Stockton Heat (AHL); Kansas City Mavericks (ECHL)

Team leaders
- Goals: Johnny Gaudreau; Elias Lindholm (19)
- Assists: Johnny Gaudreau (30)
- Points: Johnny Gaudreau (49)
- Penalty minutes: Matthew Tkachuk (55)
- Plus/minus: Christopher Tanev (+15)
- Wins: Jacob Markstrom (22)
- Goals against average: Jacob Markstrom (2.68)

The 2020–21 Calgary Flames season was the Flames' 41st season in Calgary, and the 49th season for the Flames' National Hockey League franchise that was established on June 6, 1972. The Flames attempted unsuccessfully to make the playoffs for a third straight year after getting eliminated in the First Round of the 2020 Stanley Cup playoffs by the Dallas Stars.

Due to the Canada–United States border restrictions brought in as a result of the COVID-19 pandemic, the Flames were re-aligned with the other six Canadian franchises into the newly formed North Division. The league's 56-game regular season was played entirely within the new divisions, meaning that Calgary and the other Canadian teams played an all-Canadian schedule for the 2020–21 regular season as well as the first two rounds of the 2021 Stanley Cup playoffs. The Flames were eliminated from playoff contention on May 10 after the Edmonton Oilers defeated the Montreal Canadiens 4–3 in overtime.

== Standings ==
=== Divisional standings ===
North Division
Pos	Team	GP	W	L	OTL	RW	GF	GA	GD	Pts
1	y – Toronto Maple Leafs	56	35	14	7	29	187	148	+39	77
2	x – Edmonton Oilers	56	35	19	2	31	183	154	+29	72
3	x – Winnipeg Jets	56	30	23	3	24	170	154	+16	63
4	x – Montreal Canadiens	56	24	21	11	20	159	168	−9	59
5	Calgary Flames	56	26	27	3	22	156	161	−5	55
6	Ottawa Senators	56	23	28	5	18	157	190	−33	51
7	Vancouver Canucks	56	23	29	4	17	151	188	−37	50

Source: National Hockey League
Rules for classification: 1) Fewer number of games played (GP, only during regular season); 2) Greater number of regulation wins (RW); 3) Greater number of wins in regulation and overtime, excluding shootout wins (ROW); 4) Greater number of total wins, including shootouts (W); 5) Greater number of points earned in head-to-head play; if teams played an uneven number of head-to-head games, the result of the first game on the home ice of the team with the extra home game is discarded; 6) Greater goal differential (GD); 7) Greater number of goals scored (GF)
x – Clinched playoff spot; y – Clinched division

== Schedule and results ==
=== Regular season ===
The regular season schedule was published on December 23, 2020.

2020–21 game log

January: 3–3–1 (Home: 2–2–0; Road: 1–1–1)
#	Date	Visitor	Score	Home	OT	Decision	Attendance	Record	Pts	Recap
1	January 14	Calgary	3–4	Winnipeg	OT	Markstrom	0	0–0–1	1
2	January 16	Vancouver	0–3	Calgary		Markstrom	0	1–0–1	3
3	January 18	Vancouver	2–5	Calgary		Markstrom	0	2–0–1	5
4	January 24	Toronto	3–2	Calgary		Markstrom	0	2–1–1	5
5	January 26	Toronto	4–3	Calgary		Markstrom	0	2–2–1	5
6	January 28	Calgary	2–4	Montreal		Rittich	0	2–3–1	5
7	January 30	Calgary	2–0	Montreal		Markstrom	0	3–3–1	7

February: 7–7–1 (Home: 2–2–0; Road: 5–5–1)
#	Date	Visitor	Score	Home	OT	Decision	Attendance	Record	Pts	Recap
8	February 1	Calgary	4–3	Winnipeg	SO	Markstrom	0	4–3–1	9
9	February 2	Calgary	2–3	Winnipeg		Rittich	0	4–4–1	9
10	February 4	Calgary	1–4	Winnipeg		Markstrom	0	4–5–1	9
11	February 6	Edmonton	4–6	Calgary		Markstrom	0	5–5–1	11
12	February 9	Winnipeg	2–3	Calgary		Markstrom	0	6–5–1	13
13	February 11	Calgary	3–1	Vancouver		Markstrom	0	7–5–1	15
14	February 13	Calgary	1–3	Vancouver		Markstrom	0	7–6–1	15
15	February 15	Calgary	4–3	Vancouver	OT	Markstrom	0	8–6–1	17
16	February 17	Vancouver	5–1	Calgary		Markstrom	0	8–7–1	17
17	February 19	Edmonton	2–1	Calgary		Rittich	0	8–8–1	17
18	February 20	Calgary	1–7	Edmonton		Markstrom	0	8–9–1	17
19	February 22	Calgary	3–0	Toronto		Rittich	0	9–9–1	19
20	February 24	Calgary	1–2	Toronto	OT	Rittich	0	9–9–2	20
21	February 25	Calgary	1–6	Ottawa		Rittich	0	9–10–2	20
22	February 27	Calgary	6–3	Ottawa		Rittich	0	10–10–2	22

March: 6–8–1 (Home: 5–3–1; Road: 1–5–0)
#	Date	Visitor	Score	Home	OT	Decision	Attendance	Record	Pts	Recap
23	March 1	Calgary	1–5	Ottawa		Rittich	0	10–11–2	22
24	March 4	Ottawa	3–7	Calgary		Rittich	0	11–11–2	24
25	March 6	Calgary	2–3	Edmonton		Markstrom	0	11–12–2	24
26	March 7	Ottawa	4–3	Calgary	SO	Markstrom	0	11–12–3	25
27	March 11	Montreal	1–2	Calgary		Markstrom	0	12–12–3	27
28	March 13	Montreal	1–3	Calgary		Markstrom	0	13–12–3	29
29	March 15	Edmonton	3–4	Calgary		Markstrom	0	14–12–3	31
30	March 17	Edmonton	7–3	Calgary		Markstrom	0	14–13–3	31
31	March 19	Calgary	4–3	Toronto		Markstrom	0	15–13–3	33
32	March 20	Calgary	0–2	Toronto		Rittich	0	15–14–3	33
33	March 22	Calgary	1–2	Ottawa		Markstrom	0	15–15–3	33
34	March 24	Calgary	1–3	Ottawa		Markstrom	0	15–16–3	33
35	March 26	Winnipeg	3–2	Calgary		Markstrom	0	15–17–3	33
36	March 27	Winnipeg	2–4	Calgary		Rittich	0	16–17–3	35
37	March 29	Winnipeg	5–1	Calgary		Markstrom	0	16–18–3	35
—	March 31	Calgary		Vancouver	Postponed due to COVID-19. Rescheduled for May 16.

April: 6–6–0 (Home: 3–4–0; Road: 3–2–0)
#	Date	Visitor	Score	Home	OT	Decision	Attendance	Record	Pts	Recap
38	April 2	Calgary	2–3	Edmonton		Markstrom	0	16–19–3	35
39	April 4	Toronto	4–2	Calgary		Rittich	0	16–20–3	35
40	April 5	Toronto	5–3	Calgary		Markstrom	0	16–21–3	35
—	April 8	Vancouver		Calgary	Postponed due to COVID-19. Rescheduled for May 19.
—	April 10	Vancouver		Calgary	Postponed due to COVID-19. Rescheduled for May 13.
41	April 10	Edmonton	0–5	Calgary		Markstrom	0	17–21–3	37
42	April 13	Calgary	3–2	Toronto	OT	Markstrom	0	18–21–3	39
43	April 14	Calgary	4–1	Montreal		Markstrom	0	19–21–3	41
44	April 16	Calgary	1–2	Montreal		Markstrom	0	19–22–3	41
45	April 19	Ottawa	4–2	Calgary		Markstrom	0	19–23–3	41
46	April 23	Montreal	2–4	Calgary		Markstrom	0	20–23–3	43
47	April 24	Montreal	2–5	Calgary		Markstrom	0	21–23–3	45
48	April 26	Montreal	2–1	Calgary		Markstrom	0	21–24–3	45
49	April 29	Calgary	3–1	Edmonton		Markstrom	0	22–24–3	47

May: 4–3–0 (Home: 3–1–0; Road: 1–2–0)
#	Date	Visitor	Score	Home	OT	Decision	Attendance	Record	Pts	Recap
50	May 1	Calgary	1–4	Edmonton		Markstrom	0	22–25–3	47
51	May 5	Winnipeg	4–0	Calgary		Markstrom	0	22–26–3	47
52	May 9	Ottawa	1–6	Calgary		Markstrom	0	23–26–3	49
53	May 13	Vancouver	1–4	Calgary		Markstrom	0	24–26–3	51
54	May 16	Calgary	6–5	Vancouver	OT	Markstrom	0	25–26–3	53
55	May 18	Calgary	2–4	Vancouver		Domingue	0	25–27–3	53
56	May 19	Vancouver	2–6	Calgary		Markstrom	0	26–27–3	55

Legend: Win (2 points) Loss (0 points) Overtime/shootout loss (1 point)

== Player statistics ==
=== Skaters ===
Regular season
Player	GP	G	A	Pts	+/−	PIM
Johnny Gaudreau	56	19	30	49	+2	6
Elias Lindholm	56	19	28	47	+10	22
Matthew Tkachuk	56	16	27	43	+6	55
Andrew Mangiapane	56	18	14	32	+1	24
Mikael Backlund	54	9	23	32	−7	30
Sean Monahan	50	10	18	28	−6	10
Mark Giordano	56	9	17	26	+5	14
Milan Lucic	56	10	13	23	−8	46
Dillon Dube	51	11	11	22	−1	20
Rasmus Andersson	56	5	16	21	−9	34
Noah Hanifin	47	4	11	15	−2	18
Derek Ryan	43	2	11	13	+6	16
Sam Bennett	38	4	8	12	−14	19
Christopher Tanev	56	2	10	12	+15	6
Juuso Valimaki	49	2	9	11	−2	26
Josh Leivo	38	6	3	9	−3	10
Brett Ritchie	32	4	4	8	−5	24
Joakim Nordstrom	44	1	6	7	+1	6
Michael Stone	21	2	2	4	−1	6
Nikita Nesterov	38	0	4	4	−10	20
Connor Mackey	6	1	2	3	+3	20
Byron Froese	6	1	0	1	+1	2
Oliver Kylington	8	0	1	1	−1	0
Glenn Gawdin	7	0	1	1	−1	0
Adam Ruzicka	3	0	1	1	+2	4
Dominik Simon	11	0	0	0	0	0
Buddy Robinson	9	0	0	0	0	0
Zac Rinaldo	4	0	0	0	−1	5
Matthew Phillips	1	0	0	0	0	0

=== Goaltenders ===
Regular season
Player	GP	GS	TOI	W	L	OT	GA	GAA	SA	SV%	SO	G	A	PIM
Jacob Markstrom	43	43	2,487:56	22	19	2	111	2.68	1,161	.904	3	0	0	2
David Rittich^{‡}	15	12	745:05	4	7	1	36	2.90	374	.904	1	0	0	0
Artyom Zagidulin	1	0	28:13	0	0	0	2	4.25	11	.818	0	0	0	0
Louis Domingue	1	1	57:42	0	1	0	3	3.12	23	.870	0	0	0	0

^{†}Denotes player spent time with another team before joining the Flames. Stats reflect time with the Flames only.
^{‡}Denotes player was traded mid-season. Stats reflect time with the Flames only.
Bold/italics denotes franchise record.

== Draft picks ==
Below are the Calgary Flames' selections at the 2020 NHL entry draft, which was originally scheduled for June 26–27, 2020 at the Bell Center in Montreal, Quebec, but was postponed on March 25, 2020, due to the COVID-19 pandemic. The draft was held October 6–7, 2020 virtually via Video conference call from the NHL Network studio in Secaucus, New Jersey.

Round	#	Player	Pos	Nationality	College/Junior/Club team (League)
1	24	Connor Zary	C	Canada	Kamloops Blazers (WHL)
2	50	Yan Kuznetsov	D	Russia	UConn (H-East)
3	72	Jeremie Poirier	D	Canada	Saint John Sea Dogs (QMJHL)
4	96	Daniil Chechelev	G	Russia	Russkiye Vitazi Chekhov (MHL)
5	143	Ryan Francis	RW	Canada	Cape Breton Eagles (QMJHL)
6	174	Rory Kerins	C	Canada	Sault Ste. Marie Greyhounds (OHL)
7	205	Ilya Solovyov	D	Belarus	Dinamo Minsk (KHL)
