= 2020–21 Winnipeg Jets season =

National Hockey League team season

2020–21 Winnipeg Jets
- Division: 3rd North
- 2020–21 record: 30–23–3
- Home record: 13–13–2
- Road record: 17–10–1
- Goals for: 170
- Goals against: 154

Team information
- General manager: Kevin Cheveldayoff
- Coach: Paul Maurice
- Captain: Blake Wheeler
- Alternate captains: Josh Morrissey; Mark Scheifele
- Arena: Bell MTS Place
- Minor league affiliates: Manitoba Moose (AHL); Jacksonville Icemen (ECHL)

Team leaders
- Goals: Kyle Connor (26)
- Assists: Mark Scheifele (42)
- Points: Mark Scheifele (63)
- Penalty minutes: Blake Wheeler (50)
- Plus/minus: Nikolaj Ehlers (+15)
- Wins: Connor Hellebuyck (24)
- Goals against average: Laurent Brossoit (2.42)

The 2020–21 Winnipeg Jets season 38th season of play for the National Hockey League (NHL) franchise that was established on June 22, 1979, 46th season for the organization overall, and the tenth in Winnipeg, since the franchise relocated from Atlanta prior to the start of the 2011–12 NHL season.

Due to the Canada–U.S. border restrictions brought in as a result of the COVID-19 pandemic, the Jets were re-aligned with the other six Canadian franchises into the newly formed North Division. The league's 56 game season was played entirely within the new divisions, meaning that Winnipeg and the other Canadian teams played an all-Canadian schedule for the 2020–21 regular season as well as the first two rounds of the 2021 Stanley Cup playoffs.

On May 5, the Jets clinched a playoff berth after a 4–0 defeat over the Calgary Flames. In the first round of the playoffs, they completed the franchise's first playoff sweep against the Edmonton Oilers, with a 4–3 triple overtime win in game four. However, the Jets were upset in the second round, being swept by the Montreal Canadiens.

== Standings ==
=== Divisional standings ===
North Division
Pos	Team	GP	W	L	OTL	RW	GF	GA	GD	Pts
1	y – Toronto Maple Leafs	56	35	14	7	29	187	148	+39	77
2	x – Edmonton Oilers	56	35	19	2	31	183	154	+29	72
3	x – Winnipeg Jets	56	30	23	3	24	170	154	+16	63
4	x – Montreal Canadiens	56	24	21	11	20	159	168	−9	59
5	Calgary Flames	56	26	27	3	22	156	161	−5	55
6	Ottawa Senators	56	23	28	5	18	157	190	−33	51
7	Vancouver Canucks	56	23	29	4	17	151	188	−37	50

Source: National Hockey League
Rules for classification: 1) Fewer number of games played (GP, only during regular season); 2) Greater number of regulation wins (RW); 3) Greater number of wins in regulation and overtime, excluding shootout wins (ROW); 4) Greater number of total wins, including shootouts (W); 5) Greater number of points earned in head-to-head play; if teams played an uneven number of head-to-head games, the result of the first game on the home ice of the team with the extra home game is discarded; 6) Greater goal differential (GD); 7) Greater number of goals scored (GF)
x – Clinched playoff spot; y – Clinched division

== Schedule and results ==
=== Regular season ===
The regular season schedule was published on December 23, 2020.

2020–21 game log

January: 5–3–0 (Home: 3–2–0; Road: 2–1–0)
#	Date	Visitor	Score	Home	OT	Decision	Attendance	Record	Pts	Recap
1	January 14	Calgary	3–4	Winnipeg	OT	Hellebuyck	0	1–0–0	2
2	January 18	Winnipeg	1–3	Toronto		Hellebuyck	0	1–1–0	2
3	January 19	Winnipeg	4–3	Ottawa	OT	Brossoit	0	2–1–0	4
4	January 21	Winnipeg	4–1	Ottawa		Hellebuyck	0	3–1–0	6
5	January 23	Ottawa	3–6	Winnipeg		Hellebuyck	0	4–1–0	8
6	January 24	Edmonton	4–3	Winnipeg		Brossoit	0	4–2–0	8
7	January 26	Edmonton	4–6	Winnipeg		Hellebuyck	0	5–2–0	10
8	January 30	Vancouver	4–1	Winnipeg		Hellebuyck	0	5–3–0	10

February: 8–3–1 (Home: 5–1–1; Road: 3–2–0)
#	Date	Visitor	Score	Home	OT	Decision	Attendance	Record	Pts	Recap
9	February 1	Calgary	4–3	Winnipeg	SO	Hellebuyck	0	5–3–1	11
10	February 2	Calgary	2–3	Winnipeg		Brossoit	0	6–3–1	13
11	February 4	Calgary	1–4	Winnipeg		Hellebuyck	0	7–3–1	15
12	February 9	Winnipeg	2–3	Calgary		Hellebuyck	0	7–4–1	15
13	February 11	Ottawa	1–5	Winnipeg		Hellebuyck	0	8–4–1	17
14	February 13	Ottawa	2–1	Winnipeg		Hellebuyck	0	8–5–1	17
15	February 15	Winnipeg	6–5	Edmonton		Hellebuyck	0	9–5–1	19
16	February 17	Winnipeg	2–3	Edmonton		Hellebuyck	0	9–6–1	19
17	February 19	Winnipeg	2–0	Vancouver		Brossoit	0	10–6–1	21
18	February 21	Winnipeg	4–3	Vancouver	OT	Hellebuyck	0	11–6–1	23
19	February 25	Montreal	3–6	Winnipeg		Hellebuyck	0	12–6–1	25
20	February 27	Montreal	1–2	Winnipeg	OT	Hellebuyck	0	13–6–1	27

March: 9–7–1 (Home: 2–3–0; Road: 7–4–1)
#	Date	Visitor	Score	Home	OT	Decision	Attendance	Record	Pts	Recap
21	March 1	Vancouver	4–0	Winnipeg		Hellebuyck	0	13–7–1	27
22	March 2	Vancouver	2–5	Winnipeg		Brossoit	0	14–7–1	29
23	March 4	Winnipeg	4–3	Montreal	OT	Hellebuyck	0	15–7–1	31
24	March 6	Winnipeg	1–7	Montreal		Hellebuyck	0	15–8–1	31
25	March 9	Winnipeg	4–3	Toronto		Hellebuyck	0	16–8–1	33
26	March 11	Winnipeg	3–4	Toronto	OT	Hellebuyck	0	16–8–2	34
27	March 13	Winnipeg	5—2	Toronto		Brossoit	0	17–8–2	36
28	March 15	Montreal	4–2	Winnipeg		Hellebuyck	0	17–9–2	36
29	March 17	Montreal	3–4	Winnipeg	OT	Hellebuyck	0	18–9–2	38
30	March 18	Winnipeg	1–2	Edmonton		Brossoit	0	18–10–2	38
31	March 20	Winnipeg	2–4	Edmonton		Hellebuyck	0	18–11–2	38
32	March 22	Winnipeg	4–0	Vancouver		Hellebuyck	0	19–11–2	40
33	March 24	Winnipeg	5–1	Vancouver		Hellebuyck	0	20–11–2	42
34	March 26	Winnipeg	3–2	Calgary		Hellebuyck	0	21–11–2	44
35	March 27	Winnipeg	2–4	Calgary		Brossoit	0	21–12–2	44
36	March 29	Winnipeg	5–1	Calgary		Hellebuyck	0	22–12–2	46
37	March 31	Toronto	3–1	Winnipeg		Hellebuyck	0	22–13–2	46

April: 5–7–1 (Home: 1–5–1; Road: 4–2–0)
#	Date	Visitor	Score	Home	OT	Decision	Attendance	Record	Pts	Recap
38	April 2	Toronto	2–1	Winnipeg	SO	Hellebuyck	0	22–13–3	47
—	April 4	Vancouver		Winnipeg	Postponed due to COVID-19. Rescheduled for May 10.
39	April 5	Ottawa	3–4	Winnipeg		Hellebuyck	0	23–13–3	49
—	April 6	Vancouver		Winnipeg	Postponed due to COVID-19. Rescheduled for May 11.
40	April 8	Winnipeg	4–2	Montreal		Hellebuyck	0	24–13–3	51
41	April 10	Winnipeg	5–0	Montreal		Hellebuyck	0	25–13–3	53
42	April 12	Winnipeg	2–4	Ottawa		Hellebuyck	0	25–14–3	53
43	April 14	Winnipeg	3–2	Ottawa		Brossoit	0	26–14–3	55
44	April 15	Winnipeg	5–2	Toronto		Hellebuyck	0	27–14–3	57
45	April 17	Edmonton	3–0	Winnipeg		Hellebuyck	0	27–15–3	57
46	April 22	Toronto	5–3	Winnipeg		Brossoit	0	27–16–3	57
47	April 24	Toronto	4–1	Winnipeg		Hellebuyck	0	27–17–3	57
48	April 26	Edmonton	6–1	Winnipeg		Hellebuyck	0	27–18–3	57
49	April 28	Edmonton	3–1	Winnipeg		Hellebuyck	0	27–19–3	57
50	April 30	Winnipeg	3–5	Montreal		Hellebuyck	0	27–20–3	57

May: 3–3–0 (Home: 2–2–0; Road: 1–1–0)
#	Date	Visitor	Score	Home	OT	Decision	Attendance	Record	Pts	Recap
51	May 3	Winnipeg	1–2	Ottawa		Brossoit	0	27–21–3	57
52	May 5	Winnipeg	4–0	Calgary		Hellebuyck	0	28–21–3	59
53	May 8	Ottawa	4–2	Winnipeg		Hellebuyck	0	28–22–3	59
54	May 10	Vancouver	3–1	Winnipeg		Brossoit	0	28–23–3	59
55	May 11	Vancouver	0–5	Winnipeg		Hellebuyck	0	29–23–3	61
56	May 14	Toronto	2–4	Winnipeg		Hellebuyck	0	30–23–3	63

Legend: Win (2 points) Loss (0 points) Overtime/shootout loss (1 point)

=== Playoffs ===
2021 Stanley Cup playoffs

North Division First Round vs. (N2) Edmonton Oilers: Winnipeg won 4–0
#	Date	Visitor	Score	Home	OT	Decision	Series	Recap
1	May 19	Winnipeg	4–1	Edmonton		Hellebuyck	1–0
2	May 21	Winnipeg	1–0	Edmonton	OT	Hellebuyck	2–0
3	May 23	Edmonton	4–5	Winnipeg	OT	Hellebuyck	3–0
4	May 24	Edmonton	3–4	Winnipeg	3OT	Hellebuyck	4–0

North Division Second Round vs. (N4) Montreal Canadiens: Montreal won 4–0
#	Date	Visitor	Score	Home	OT	Decision	Attendance	Series	Recap
1	June 2	Montreal	5–3	Winnipeg		Hellebuyck	500 (Note: Approximately 500 health-care workers were in attendance, but the exact number was not reported.)	0–1
2	June 4	Montreal	1–0	Winnipeg		Hellebuyck	500	0–2
3	June 6	Winnipeg	1–5	Montreal		Hellebuyck	5,326	0–3
4	June 7	Winnipeg	2–3	Montreal	OT	Hellebuyck	5,539	0–4

Legend: Win Loss

== Player statistics ==
=== Skaters ===
Regular season
Player	GP	G	A	Pts	+/−	PIM
Mark Scheifele	56	21	42	63	−4	12
Kyle Connor	56	26	24	50	−4	12
Nikolaj Ehlers	47	21	25	46	+15	15
Blake Wheeler	50	15	31	46	−17	50
Andrew Copp	55	15	24	39	+2	20
Neal Pionk	54	3	29	32	+6	20
Paul Stastny	56	13	16	29	−3	32
Mason Appleton	56	12	13	25	+11	14
Adam Lowry	52	10	14	24	+6	13
Josh Morrissey	56	4	17	21	−1	25
Pierre-Luc Dubois^{†}	41	8	12	20	−6	36
Mathieu Perreault	56	9	10	19	+6	16
Derek Forbort	56	2	10	12	+1	35
Trevor Lewis	56	5	5	10	+7	2
Dylan DeMelo	52	0	9	9	+10	20
Nate Thompson	44	2	3	5	+4	4
Logan Stanley	37	1	3	4	+13	26
Patrik Laine^{‡}	1	2	1	3	+1	4
Jansen Harkins	26	1	1	2	−2	4
Tucker Poolman	39	0	1	1	−2	2
Nathan Beaulieu	25	0	1	1	−5	20
Kristian Vesalainen	12	0	1	1	0	0
Jordie Benn^{†}	8	0	1	1	+2	0
Dominic Toninato	2	0	1	1	0	0
Sami Niku	6	0	0	0	−3	8
David Gustafsson	4	0	0	0	−1	0
Ville Heinola	5	0	0	0	−2	2

Playoffs
Player	GP	G	A	Pts	+/−	PIM
Kyle Connor	8	3	4	7	−2	0
Mark Scheifele	5	2	3	5	+1	17
Blake Wheeler	8	2	3	5	−4	0
Josh Morrissey	8	1	4	5	−4	6
Adam Lowry	8	2	2	4	+2	0
Neal Pionk	8	0	4	4	−2	2
Nikolaj Ehlers	6	2	1	3	−5	2
Logan Stanley	8	2	1	3	+6	4
Mason Appleton	8	1	2	3	+4	2
Pierre-Luc Dubois	7	0	3	3	−3	8
Paul Stastny	6	1	1	2	+1	8
Mathieu Perreault	8	1	1	2	+1	4
Tucker Poolman	8	1	1	2	0	0
Nate Thompson	8	0	2	2	+1	2
Andrew Copp	8	0	2	2	−3	4
Derek Forbort	8	1	0	1	−1	0
Dominic Toninato	3	1	0	1	+2	2
Jordie Benn	3	0	1	1	+2	0
Dylan DeMelo	5	0	0	0	+2	2
Trevor Lewis	8	0	0	0	0	0
Jansen Harkins	1	0	0	0	0	0
Kristian Vesalainen	4	0	0	0	0	0

=== Goaltenders ===
Regular season
Player	GP	GS	TOI	W	L	OT	GA	GAA	SA	SV%	SO	G	A	PIM
Connor Hellebuyck	45	45	2,602:49	24	17	3	112	2.58	1,335	.916	4	0	0	0
Laurent Brossoit	14	11	744:07	6	6	0	30	2.42	368	.918	1	0	0	0

Playoffs
Player	GP	GS	TOI	W	L	GA	GAA	SA	SV%	SO	G	A	PIM
Connor Hellebuyck	8	8	537:45	4	4	20	2.23	289	.931	1	0	0	0

^{†}Denotes player spent time with another team before joining the Jets. Stats reflect time with the Jets only.
^{‡}Denotes player was traded mid-season. Stats reflect time with the Jets only.
