= 2020–21 Vancouver Canucks season =

Season of play of professional ice hockey team

2020–21 Vancouver Canucks
- Division: 7th North
- 2020–21 record: 23–29–4
- Home record: 13–12–3
- Road record: 10–17–1
- Goals for: 151
- Goals against: 188

Team information
- General manager: Jim Benning
- Coach: Travis Green
- Captain: Bo Horvat
- Alternate captains: Alexander Edler; Brandon Sutter
- Arena: Rogers Arena
- Minor league affiliate: Utica Comets (AHL)

Team leaders
- Goals: Brock Boeser (23)
- Assists: Quinn Hughes (38)
- Points: Brock Boeser (49)
- Penalty minutes: Alexander Edler (58)
- Plus/minus: Jordie Benn (+5)
- Wins: Thatcher Demko (16)
- Goals against average: Thatcher Demko (2.85)

The 2020–21 Vancouver Canucks season was the 51st season for the National Hockey League (NHL) franchise that was established on May 22, 1970.

Due to the Canada–United States border restrictions brought in as a result of the COVID-19 pandemic, the Canucks were re-aligned with the other six Canadian franchises into the newly formed North Division. The league's 56 game season was played entirely within the new divisions, meaning that Vancouver and the other Canadian teams played an all-Canadian schedule for the 2020–21 regular season as well as the first two rounds of the 2021 Stanley Cup playoffs.

On March 31, 2021, the first of several Canucks games were postponed due to COVID protocols. By April, a majority of the team had tested positive for COVID-19, including several coaches. It is the most extensive COVID outbreak in the NHL and in North American professional sports to date. The Canucks were eliminated from playoff contention on May 10 after the Edmonton Oilers defeated the Montreal Canadiens 4–3 in overtime.

== Standings ==
=== Divisional standings ===
North Division
Pos	Team	GP	W	L	OTL	RW	GF	GA	GD	Pts
1	y – Toronto Maple Leafs	56	35	14	7	29	187	148	+39	77
2	x – Edmonton Oilers	56	35	19	2	31	183	154	+29	72
3	x – Winnipeg Jets	56	30	23	3	24	170	154	+16	63
4	x – Montreal Canadiens	56	24	21	11	20	159	168	−9	59
5	Calgary Flames	56	26	27	3	22	156	161	−5	55
6	Ottawa Senators	56	23	28	5	18	157	190	−33	51
7	Vancouver Canucks	56	23	29	4	17	151	188	−37	50

Source: National Hockey League
Rules for classification: 1) Fewer number of games played (GP, only during regular season); 2) Greater number of regulation wins (RW); 3) Greater number of wins in regulation and overtime, excluding shootout wins (ROW); 4) Greater number of total wins, including shootouts (W); 5) Greater number of points earned in head-to-head play; if teams played an uneven number of head-to-head games, the result of the first game on the home ice of the team with the extra home game is discarded; 6) Greater goal differential (GD); 7) Greater number of goals scored (GF)
x – Clinched playoff spot; y – Clinched division

== Schedule and results ==
=== Regular season ===
The regular season schedule was released on December 23, 2020.

2020–21 game log

January: 6–5–0 (Home: 4–2–0; Road: 2–3–0)
#	Date	Visitor	Score	Home	OT	Decision	Attendance	Record	Pts	Recap
1	January 13	Vancouver	5–3	Edmonton		Holtby	0	1–0–0	2
2	January 14	Vancouver	2–5	Edmonton		Demko	0	1–1–0	2
3	January 16	Vancouver	0–3	Calgary		Holtby	0	1–2–0	2
4	January 18	Vancouver	2–5	Calgary		Demko	0	1–3–0	2
5	January 20	Montreal	5–6	Vancouver	SO	Holtby	0	2–3–0	4
6	January 21	Montreal	7–3	Vancouver		Demko	0	2–4–0	4
7	January 23	Montreal	5–2	Vancouver		Holtby	0	2–5–0	4
8	January 25	Ottawa	1–7	Vancouver		Demko	0	3–5–0	6
9	January 27	Ottawa	1–5	Vancouver		Demko	0	4–5–0	8
10	January 28	Ottawa	1–4	Vancouver		Holtby	0	5–5–0	10
11	January 30	Vancouver	4–1	Winnipeg		Demko	0	6–5–0	12

February: 2–9–2 (Home: 1–4–2; Road: 1–5–0)
#	Date	Visitor	Score	Home	OT	Decision	Attendance	Record	Pts	Recap
12	February 1	Vancouver	2–6	Montreal		Holtby	0	6–6–0	12
13	February 2	Vancouver	3–5	Montreal		Demko	0	6–7–0	12
14	February 4	Vancouver	3–7	Toronto		Demko	0	6–8–0	12
15	February 6	Vancouver	1–5	Toronto		Holtby	0	6–9–0	12
16	February 8	Vancouver	1–3	Toronto		Holtby	0	6–10–0	12
17	February 11	Calgary	3–1	Vancouver		Demko	0	6–11–0	12
18	February 13	Calgary	1–3	Vancouver		Demko	0	7–11–0	14
19	February 15	Calgary	4–3	Vancouver	OT	Demko	0	7–11–1	15
20	February 17	Vancouver	5–1	Calgary		Holtby	0	8–11–1	17
21	February 19	Winnipeg	2–0	Vancouver		Demko	0	8–12–1	17
22	February 21	Winnipeg	4–3	Vancouver	OT	Holtby	0	8–12–2	18
23	February 23	Edmonton	4–3	Vancouver		Demko	0	8–13–2	18
24	February 25	Edmonton	3–0	Vancouver		Demko	0	8–14–2	18

March: 8–4–1 (Home: 4–3–0; Road: 4–1–1)
#	Date	Visitor	Score	Home	OT	Decision	Attendance	Record	Pts	Recap
25	March 1	Vancouver	4–0	Winnipeg		Demko	0	9–14–2	20
26	March 2	Vancouver	2–5	Winnipeg		Holtby	0	9–15–2	20
27	March 4	Toronto	1–3	Vancouver		Demko	0	10–15–2	22
28	March 6	Toronto	2–4	Vancouver		Demko	0	11–15–2	24
29	March 8	Montreal	1–2	Vancouver	SO	Demko	0	12–15–2	26
30	March 10	Montreal	5–1	Vancouver		Demko	0	12–16–2	26
31	March 13	Edmonton	1–2	Vancouver		Demko	0	13–16–2	28
32	March 15	Vancouver	3–2	Ottawa	OT	Demko	0	14–16–2	30
33	March 17	Vancouver	3–2	Ottawa	SO	Demko	0	15–16–2	32
34	March 19	Vancouver	3–2	Montreal	OT	Demko	0	16–16–2	34
35	March 20	Vancouver	4–5	Montreal	SO	Holtby	0	16–16–3	35
36	March 22	Winnipeg	4–0	Vancouver		Demko	0	16–17–3	35
37	March 24	Winnipeg	5–1	Vancouver		Demko	0	16–18–3	35
—	March 31	Calgary	–	Vancouver	Postponed due to COVID-19. Rescheduled for May 16.

April: 3–4–0 (Home: 3–1–0; Road: 0–3–0)
#	Date	Visitor	Score	Home	OT	Decision	Attendance	Record	Pts	Recap
—	April 3	Vancouver	–	Edmonton	Postponed due to COVID-19. Rescheduled for May 6.
—	April 4	Vancouver	–	Winnipeg	Postponed due to COVID-19. Rescheduled for May 10.
—	April 6	Vancouver	–	Winnipeg	Postponed due to COVID-19. Rescheduled for May 11.
—	April 8	Vancouver	–	Calgary	Postponed due to COVID-19. Rescheduled for May 19.
—	April 10	Vancouver	–	Calgary	Postponed due to COVID-19. Rescheduled for May 13.
—	April 12	Vancouver	–	Edmonton	Postponed due to COVID-19. Rescheduled for May 8.
—	April 14	Vancouver	–	Edmonton	Postponed due to COVID-19. Rescheduled for May 15.
—	April 16	Edmonton	–	Vancouver	Postponed due to COVID-19. Rescheduled for May 3.
—	April 17	Toronto	–	Vancouver	Postponed due to COVID-19. Rescheduled for April 18.
38	April 18	Toronto	2–3	Vancouver	OT	Holtby	0	17–18–3	37
—	April 19	Toronto	–	Vancouver	Postponed due to COVID-19. Rescheduled for April 20.
39	April 20	Toronto	3–6	Vancouver		Holtby	0	18–18–3	39
40	April 22	Ottawa	3–0	Vancouver		Demko	0	18–19–3	39
41	April 24	Ottawa	2–4	Vancouver		Holtby	0	19–19–3	41
42	April 26	Vancouver	1–2	Ottawa		Holtby	0	19–20–3	41
43	April 28	Vancouver	3–6	Ottawa		Demko	0	19–21–3	41
44	April 29	Vancouver	1–4	Toronto		Holtby	0	19–22–3	41

May: 4–7–1 (Home: 1–2–1; Road: 3–5–0)
#	Date	Visitor	Score	Home	OT	Decision	Attendance	Record	Pts	Recap
45	May 1	Vancouver	1–5	Toronto		Demko	0	19–23–3	41
46	May 3	Edmonton	5–3	Vancouver		Holtby	0	19–24–3	41
47	May 4	Edmonton	4–1	Vancouver		Demko	0	19–25–3	41
48	May 6	Vancouver	6–3	Edmonton		Demko	0	20–25–3	43
49	May 8	Vancouver	3–4	Edmonton		Demko	0	20–26–3	43
50	May 10	Vancouver	3–1	Winnipeg		Demko	0	21–26–3	45
51	May 11	Vancouver	0–5	Winnipeg		Holtby	0	21–27–3	45
52	May 13	Vancouver	1–4	Calgary		Demko	0	21–28–3	45
53	May 15	Vancouver	4–1	Edmonton		Demko	0	22–28–3	47
54	May 16	Calgary	6–5	Vancouver	OT	Holtby	0	22–28–4	48
55	May 18	Calgary	2–4	Vancouver		Demko	0	23–28–4	50
56	May 19	Vancouver	2–6	Calgary		Holtby	0	23–29–4	50

Legend: Win (2 points) Loss (0 points) Overtime/shootout loss (1 point)

=== Detailed records ===
North Division
Opponent	Home	Away	Total	Pts	GF	GA
Calgary Flames	2–1–2	1–4–0	3–5–2	8	26	35
Edmonton Oilers	1–4–0	3–2–0	4–6–0	8	29	33
Montreal Canadiens	2–3–0	1–2–1	3–5–1	7	26	41
Ottawa Senators	4–1–0	2–2–0	6–3–0	12	30	20
Toronto Maple Leafs	4–0–0	0–5–0	4–5–0	8	23	32
Winnipeg Jets	0–3–1	3–2–0	3–5–1	7	17	27
Total	13–12–3	10–17–1	23–29–4	50	151	188

== Player statistics ==
=== Skaters ===
Regular season
Player	GP	G	A	Pts	+/−	PIM
Brock Boeser	56	23	26	49	−3	16
J. T. Miller	53	15	31	46	−7	43
Quinn Hughes	56	3	38	41	−24	22
Bo Horvat	56	19	20	39	−6	23
Nils Hoglander	56	13	14	27	−4	16
Elias Pettersson	26	10	11	21	0	6
Tyler Myers	55	6	15	21	−8	51
Tanner Pearson	51	10	8	18	−15	26
Nate Schmidt	54	5	10	15	−7	4
Brandon Sutter	43	9	3	12	−9	2
Travis Hamonic	38	3	7	10	−3	39
Tyler Motte	24	6	3	9	0	14
Jordie Benn^{‡}	31	1	8	9	+5	9
Alexander Edler	52	0	8	8	−8	58
Adam Gaudette^{‡}	33	4	3	7	−13	12
Jake Virtanen	38	5	0	5	−4	41
Matthew Highmore^{†}	18	3	2	5	0	2
Jayce Hawryluk	30	2	3	5	−7	9
Jay Beagle	30	1	4	5	−2	8
Tyler Graovac	14	3	1	4	−3	6
Antoine Roussel	35	1	3	4	+4	37
Olli Juolevi	23	2	1	3	−1	0
Jack Rathbone	8	1	2	3	+1	0
Jimmy Vesey^{†}	20	0	3	3	−10	6
Travis Boyd^{†}	19	2	0	2	−6	0
Zack MacEwen	34	1	1	2	−2	44
Jalen Chatfield	18	0	1	1	−11	12
Brogan Rafferty	1	0	1	1	−1	0
Loui Eriksson	7	0	1	1	−3	2
Justin Bailey	3	0	0	0	−2	2
Marc Michaelis	15	0	0	0	−5	2
Guillaume Brisebois	1	0	0	0	0	0
Kole Lind	7	0	0	0	−4	0
Jonah Gadjovich	1	0	0	0	−1	17
William Lockwood	2	0	0	0	−2	2

=== Goaltenders ===
Regular season
Player	GP	GS	TOI	W	L	OT	GA	GAA	SA	SV%	SO	G	A	PIM
Thatcher Demko	35	35	2,086:48	16	18	1	99	2.85	1,164	.915	1	0	0	0
Braden Holtby	21	21	1,260:29	7	11	3	77	3.67	695	.889	0	0	1	0

^{†}Denotes player spent time with another team before joining the Canucks. Stats reflect time with the Canucks only.
^{‡}Denotes player was traded mid-season. Stats reflect time with the Canucks only.
Bold/italics denotes franchise record.

== Awards and honours ==
=== Milestones ===
Regular season
Player	Milestone	Reached
Nils Hoglander	1st career NHL game 1st career NHL goal 1st career NHL point	January 13, 2021
Olli Juolevi	1st career NHL regular season game	January 13, 2021
Brock Boeser	200th career NHL game	January 16, 2021
Nate Schmidt	400th career NHL game	January 18, 2021
Jalen Chatfield	1st career NHL game	January 20, 2021
Nils Hoglander	1st career NHL assist	January 21, 2021
Brogan Rafferty	1st career NHL assist 1st career NHL point	January 21, 2021
Olli Juolevi	1st career NHL goal 1st career NHL point	January 25, 2021
Brandon Sutter	1st career NHL hat-trick	January 25, 2021
Tyler Motte	200th career NHL game	February 2, 2021
Jay Beagle	600th career NHL game	February 11, 2021
J. T. Miller	200th career NHL assist	February 21, 2021
Antoine Roussel	1000th career NHL Penalty minute	February 25, 2021
Jake Virtanen	300th career NHL game	March 2, 2021
Marc Michaelis	1st career NHL game	March 4, 2021
Quinn Hughes	100th career NHL game	March 4, 2021
Alexander Edler	900th career NHL game	March 6, 2021
Jordie Benn	100th career NHL assist	March 14, 2021
Tyler Myers	300th career NHL point	March 14, 2021
Jalen Chatfield	1st career NHL assist 1st career NHL point	April 18, 2021
Kole Lind	1st career NHL game	April 29, 2021
Tanner Pearson	500th career NHL game	May 4, 2021
Brock Boeser	200th career NHL points	May 4, 2021
Bo Horvat	500th career NHL game	May 16, 2021
Jonah Gadjovich	1st career NHL game	May 16, 2021
William Lockwood	1st career NHL game	May 18, 2021

== Transactions ==
The Canucks have been involved in the following transactions during the 2020–21 season.

=== Trades ===
Date	Details		Ref
October 12, 2020	To Vegas Golden Knights 3rd-round pick in 2022	To Vancouver Canucks Nate Schmidt	
April 12, 2021	To Chicago Blackhawks Adam Gaudette	To Vancouver Canucks Matthew Highmore	
April 12, 2021	To Chicago Blackhawks 4th-round pick in 2021	To Vancouver Canucks Madison Bowey; 5th-round pick in 2021	
April 12, 2021	To Winnipeg Jets Jordie Benn	To Vancouver Canucks 6th-round pick in 2021	
July 17, 2021	To Dallas Stars 3rd-round pick in 2021	To Vancouver Canucks Jason Dickinson	

=== Free agents ===
Date	Player	Team	Contract term	Ref
October 9, 2020	Braden Holtby	from Washington Capitals	2-year	
October 9, 2020	Jacob Markstrom	to Calgary Flames	6-year	
October 9, 2020	Christopher Tanev	to Calgary Flames	4-year	
October 10, 2020	Louis Domingue	to Calgary Flames	1-year	
October 10, 2020	Troy Stecher	to Detroit Red Wings	2-year	
October 12, 2020	Tyler Toffoli	to Montreal Canadiens	4-year	
October 19, 2020	Jayce Hawryluk	from Ottawa Senators	1-year	
October 24, 2020	Josh Leivo	to Calgary Flames	1-year	
October 27, 2020	Oscar Fantenberg	to SKA Saint Petersburg (KHL)	1-year	
January 12, 2021	Travis Hamonic	from Calgary Flames	1-year	

=== Waivers ===
Date	Player	Team	Ref
March 17, 2021	Jimmy Vesey	from Toronto Maple Leafs	
March 22, 2021	Travis Boyd	from Toronto Maple Leafs	

=== Contract terminations ===
Date	Player	Via	Ref

=== Retirement ===
Date	Player	Ref

=== Signings ===
Date	Player	Contract term	Ref
October 6, 2020	Zack MacEwen	2-year	
October 9, 2020	Tyler Motte	2-year	
October 13, 2020	Ashton Sautner	1-year	
October 16, 2020	Jake Kielly	1-year	
October 19, 2020	Adam Gaudette	1-year	
October 22, 2020	Jake Virtanen	2-year	
October 30, 2020	Guillaume Brisebois	1-year	
December 9, 2020	Jalen Chatfield	1-year	
December 13, 2020	Tyler Graovac	1-year	
December 17, 2020	Justin Bailey	1-year	
January 6, 2021	Carson Focht	3-year	
April 8, 2021	Thatcher Demko	5-year	
April 8, 2021	Tanner Pearson	3-year	
May 30, 2021	Vasily Podkolzin	3-year	
June 1, 2021	Karel Plášek	3-year	

== Draft picks ==
Below are the Vancouver Canucks' selections at the 2020 NHL entry draft, which was held virtually via video conference call on October 6 and 7, 2020 from the NHL Network studios in Secaucus, New Jersey, due to the COVID-19 pandemic.

Round	#	Player	Pos	Nationality	College/Junior/Club team (League)
3	82	Joni Jurmo	D	Finland	Jokerit U20 (Jr. A SM-liiga)
4	113	Jackson Kunz	LW	United States	Shattuck-St. Mary's High School (Minnesota)
5	144	Jacob Truscott	D	United States	U.S. NTDP U-18 (USHL)
6	175	Dmitry Zlodeyev	C	Russia	Dynamo Moscow 2 (MHL)
7	191^{3}	Viktor Persson	D	Sweden	Kamloops Blazers (WHL)

Notes:

1. The Vancouver Canucks' first-round pick went to the New Jersey Devils as the result of a trade on February 16, 2020 that sent Blake Coleman to Tampa Bay in exchange for Nolan Foote and this pick (being conditional at the time of the trade). The condition – New Jersey will receive a first-round pick in 2020 if Vancouver qualifies for the 2020 Stanley Cup playoffs – was converted when the Canucks advanced to the first round of the playoffs on August 7, 2020.
  Tampa Bay previously acquired this pick in a trade on June 22, 2019 that sent J. T. Miller to Vancouver in exchange for Marek Mazanec, a third-round pick in 2019 and this pick.
2. The Vancouver Canucks' second-round pick went to the Detroit Red Wings as the result of a trade on October 7, 2020 that sent Edmonton's second-round pick in 2020 (45th overall) to Los Angeles in exchange for a fourth-round pick in 2020 (97th overall) and this pick.
  Los Angeles previously acquired this pick as the result of a trade on February 17, 2020 that sent Tyler Toffoli to Vancouver in exchange for Tim Schaller, Tyler Madden, a conditional fourth-round pick in 2022 and this pick.
3. The Anaheim Ducks' seventh-round pick went to the Vancouver Canucks as the result of a trade on January 16, 2019 that sent Michael Del Zotto to Anaheim in exchange for Luke Schenn and this pick.
4. The Vancouver Canucks' seventh-round pick went to the San Jose Sharks as the result of a trade on October 7, 2020 that sent a fifth-round pick in 2020 (127th overall) to the New York Rangers in exchange for a seventh-round pick in 2020 (196th overall) and this pick.
  The Rangers previously acquired this pick as the result of a trade on February 12, 2019 that sent Marek Mazanec to Vancouver in exchange for this pick.
