= Olle Engstrand =

Swedish academic

Karl Erik Olof (Olle) Engstrand (born 24 August 1943 in Uppsala) is Professor Emeritus of Phonetics at Stockholm University.

== See also ==
- History of Phonetics

Bibliography (see also Swedish version):

"Fonetikens grunder", Lund: Studentlitteratur, 2004 (course book) "Fonetik light", Lund: Studentlitteratur, 2007 (course book) "Hur låter svenskan, ejengklien?" Stockholm: Norstedts, 2012 (popular science) "Kan du säga Schweiz?" En bok om uttal på svenska och utländska. Stockholm: Morfem, 2016 (popular science) "Hundra nyanser av indoeuropeiska – om moderspråket och hennes döttrar", Stockholm: Morfem, 2019 (popular science) "Skriften – vår bästa uppfinning", Stockholm: Morfem, 2022 (pop.vet) "Operation Spion – Mutti kommer bort", Stockholm: Lava, 2022 (fiction)
