= Eric Engstrand =

Swedish ice hockey player

- Born: 18 May 2000 (age 26) Varberg, Sweden
- Height: 6 ft 4 in (193 cm)
- Weight: 212 lb (96 kg; 15 st 2 lb)
- Position: Left winger
- Shoots: Left
- SHL team Former teams: Färjestad BK; Malmö Redhawks
- NHL draft: 155th overall, 2020; Ottawa Senators
- Playing career: 2020–present

Eric Engstrand (born 18 May 2000) is a Swedish ice hockey left winger who plays for Färjestad BK of the SHL. He was drafted by the Ottawa Senators in the 5th round of the 2020 NHL entry draft with the 155th overall pick.

During the 2022–23 season, during his fourth year with Malmö Redhawks in the SHL, Engstrand did not score in 11 regular-season games before deciding to transfer to the reigning champions, Färjestad BK, on December 8, 2022, for the rest of the season.

== Career statistics ==
			Regular season					Playoffs
Season	Team	League	GP	G	A	Pts	PIM	GP	G	A	Pts	PIM
2017–18	Frölunda HC	J20	31	4	7	11	12	4	0	0	0	0
2018–19	Frölunda HC	J20	42	7	19	26	26	6	4	1	5	27
2018–19	Hanhals IF	Div.1	18	3	2	5	33	—	—	—	—	—
2019–20	Malmö Redhawks	J20	37	23	35	58	36	—	—	—	—	—
2019–20	Malmö Redhawks	SHL	9	0	0	0	2	—	—	—	—	—
2020–21	Malmö Redhawks	SHL	45	1	4	5	8	2	0	0	0	0
2021–22	Malmö Redhawks	SHL	41	7	3	10	2	—	—	—	—	—
2021–22	IF Troja-Ljungby	Allsv	14	1	3	4	27	—	—	—	—	—
2022–23	Malmö Redhawks	SHL	11	0	0	0	0	—	—	—	—	—
2022–23	Södertälje SK	Allsv	12	3	1	4	4	—	—	—	—	—
2022-23	Färjestad BK	SHL	28	2	5	7	8	5	0	0	0	0
2023-24	Västerås IK	Allsv	46	6	7	13	30	—	—	—	—	—
2024-25	Västerås IK	Allsv	52	6	8	14	48	2	0	0	0	0
SHL totals			134	10	12	22	20	7	0	0	0	0
