= North Division (NHL) =

National Hockey League division

- League: National Hockey League
- Sport: Ice hockey
- Founded: 2020
- Folded: 2021
- No. of teams: 7
- Last champion: Toronto Maple Leafs (1st title)

The National Hockey League's North Division (branded as Scotia NHL North Division for sponsorship reasons) was one of the four divisions used by the NHL for the 2020–21 NHL season. This division was organized in 2020 as the result of the travel restrictions that had been in place since March 2020 between the Canada–United States border due to the COVID-19 pandemic. With non-essential travel across the border still largely banned at the start of the season, the league had its seven Canadian teams play the entirety of the 2020–21 regular season and first two rounds of the playoffs against each other.

Of the four divisions in 2020–21, the North Division was the only one with a name not previously used by the NHL. It was also the first all-Canadian NHL division to play since the league first expanded into the United States in 1924.

== Division lineups ==
=== 2020–21 ===
2020-21 North Division Teams
- Calgary Flames
- Edmonton Oilers
- Montreal Canadiens
- Ottawa Senators
- Toronto Maple Leafs
- Vancouver Canucks
- Winnipeg Jets

==== Changes from the 2019–20 season ====
- The North Division is formed due to COVID-19 restrictions
- The Calgary Flames, Edmonton Oilers and Vancouver Canucks come from the Pacific Division
- The Montreal Canadiens, Ottawa Senators and Toronto Maple Leafs come from the Atlantic Division
- The Winnipeg Jets come from the Central Division

==== Changes from the 2020–21 season ====
- The division is dissolved as the league returned to previous two conference and four division alignment
- The Calgary Flames, Edmonton Oilers and Vancouver Canucks return to the Pacific Division
- The Montreal Canadiens, Ottawa Senators and Toronto Maple Leafs return to the Atlantic Division
- The Winnipeg Jets return to the Central Division

== Season results ==
| ^{(#)} | Denotes team that won the Stanley Cup |
| ^{(#)} | Denotes team that won the Clarence S. Campbell Bowl, but lost Stanley Cup Final |
| ^{(#)} | Denotes team that qualified for the Stanley Cup playoffs |
| ‡ | Denotes winner of the Presidents' Trophy |

| Season | 1st | 2nd | 3rd | 4th | 5th | 6th | 7th |
|---|---|---|---|---|---|---|---|
| 2020–21 | Toronto (77) | Edmonton (72) | Winnipeg (63) | Montreal (59) | Calgary (55) | Ottawa (51) | Vancouver (50) |
