= List of 2020–21 NHL Three Star Awards =

The 2020–21 NHL Three Star Awards are the way the National Hockey League denotes its players of the week and players of the month of the 2020–21 season.

Throughout the season the NHL will also celebrate the efforts of the off-ice stars who make it possible for games to be played amid a pandemic by honoring frontline healthcare heroes from the regions represented by the weekly and monthly stars.

== Weekly ==
Weekly
Week	First Star	Second Star	Third Star	Healthcare Hero
January 17, 2021	Kirill Kaprizov (Minnesota Wild)	Travis Konecny (Philadelphia Flyers)	Steven Stamkos (Tampa Bay Lightning)	Brittany Hutchinson
January 24, 2021	Tyler Toffoli (Montreal Canadiens)	Joe Pavelski (Dallas Stars)	John Gibson (Anaheim Ducks)	Virginie Hébert
January 31, 2021	Thatcher Demko (Vancouver Canucks)	Connor McDavid (Edmonton Oilers)	Leon Draisaitl (Edmonton Oilers)	Alim Somani
February 7, 2021	David Pastrnak (Boston Bruins)	Patrick Kane (Chicago Blackhawks)	Jeff Petry (Montreal Canadiens)	Amy Ginter
February 14, 2021	Cam Atkinson (Columbus Blue Jackets)	Marc-Andre Fleury (Vegas Golden Knights)	Bryan Rust (Pittsburgh Penguins)	Dr. Laurie Hommema
February 21, 2021	Auston Matthews (Toronto Maple Leafs)	Connor McDavid (Edmonton Oilers)	David Pastrnak (Boston Bruins)	Elisa Simpson
February 28, 2021	Andrei Vasilevskiy (Tampa Bay Lightning)	Patrick Kane (Chicago Blackhawks)	Mats Zuccarello (Minnesota Wild)	Glenda M. Wright
March 7, 2021	Mark Stone (Vegas Golden Knights)	Thatcher Demko (Vancouver Canucks)	Martin Necas (Carolina Hurricanes)	Dr. Claudia Mejia
March 14, 2021	Philipp Grubauer (Colorado Avalanche)	Leon Draisaitl (Edmonton Oilers)	Nikolaj Ehlers (Winnipeg Jets)	Maria Saavedra
March 21, 2021	Calle Jarnkrok (Nashville Predators)	Connor McDavid (Edmonton Oilers)	Mika Zibanejad (New York Rangers)	Dr. Alex Jahangir
March 28, 2021	Adam Fox (New York Rangers)	Martin Necas (Carolina Hurricanes )	Juuse Saros (Nashville Predators)	Deena Trupkin
April 4, 2021	Mathew Barzal (New York Islanders)	Martin Jones (San Jose Sharks)	Brad Marchand (Boston Bruins)	Kelly McLaughlin
April 11, 2021	Connor Hellebuyck (Winnipeg Jets)	Auston Matthews (Toronto Maple Leafs)	Roope Hintz (Dallas Stars)	Melanie MacKinnon
April 18, 2021	Dustin Tokarski (Buffalo Sabres)	Artemi Panarin (New York Rangers)	Mark Stone (Vegas Golden Knights)	Michaela Pastorius
April 25, 2021	Patrick Marleau (San Jose Sharks)	Cam Talbot (Minnesota Wild)	Jonathan Huberdeau (Florida Panthers)	Jane Vergara
May 2, 2021	Thomas Greiss (Detroit Red Wings)	Connor McDavid (Edmonton Oilers)	Semyon Varlamov (New York Islanders)	Joanne MacDonald
May 9, 2021	Connor McDavid (Edmonton Oilers)	Kirill Kaprizov (Minnesota Wild)	Marc-Andre Fleury (Vegas Golden Knights)	Aleem Rajani

== Monthly ==
Monthly
Month	Central	East	North	West
January	Joe Pavelski (Dallas Stars)	James van Riemsdyk (Philadelphia Flyers)	Connor McDavid (Edmonton Oilers)	Anze Kopitar (Los Angeles Kings)
January	Heather Newby	Amanda & Josh Hathaway	Renee Herman	Maurice O'Gorman
February	Patrick Kane (Chicago Blackhawks)	David Pastrnak (Boston Bruins)	Auston Matthews (Toronto Maple Leafs)	Logan Couture (San Jose Sharks)
February	Qudus Rabiu	Cathy Draine	Natasha Salt	Martha Godinez
March	Aleksander Barkov (Florida Panthers)	Sidney Crosby (Pittsburgh Penguins)	Connor McDavid (Edmonton Oilers)	Philipp Grubauer (Colorado Avalanche)
March	Crystal Wimmer	Darby Scarantine	Fathima Aranha	Gina Minert
April	Sebastian Aho (Carolina Hurricanes)	Brad Marchand (Boston Bruins)	Auston Matthews (Toronto Maple Leafs)	Nathan MacKinnon (Colorado Avalanche)
April	Johnna Sharpe	Meaghan Quinn	Sarah Rumbolt	Alyssa Laabs

== Rookie of the Month ==
Rookie of the Month
Month	Player	Healthcare Hero
January	Vitek Vanecek (Washington Capitals)	Mary "Dani" Dell'Isola
February	Tim Stützle (Ottawa Senators)	Michele Tache
March	Alex Nedeljkovic (Carolina Hurricanes)	Deepika Malhotra
April	Jason Robertson (Dallas Stars)	Meghin Gomez
