= 2020–21 Carolina Hurricanes season =

Season of play of professional ice hockey team

2020–21 Carolina Hurricanes
- Central Division champions
- Division: 1st Central
- 2020–21 record: 36–12–8
- Home record: 20–3–5
- Road record: 16–9–3
- Goals for: 179
- Goals against: 136

Team information
- General manager: Don Waddell
- Coach: Rod Brind'Amour
- Captain: Jordan Staal
- Alternate captains: Jordan Martinook; Jaccob Slavin
- Arena: PNC Arena
- Minor league affiliate: Chicago Wolves (AHL)

Team leaders
- Goals: Sebastian Aho (24)
- Assists: Sebastian Aho (33)
- Points: Sebastian Aho (57)
- Penalty minutes: Andrei Svechnikov (44)
- Plus/minus: Martin Necas (+25)
- Wins: Alex Nedeljkovic and James Reimer (15)
- Goals against average: Alex Nedeljkovic (1.90)

The 2020–21 Carolina Hurricanes season was the 42nd season for the National Hockey League (NHL) franchise that was established in June 1979, and 23rd season since the franchise relocated from the Hartford Whalers to start the 1997–98 NHL season.

On December 20, 2020, the league temporarily realigned into four divisions with no conferences due to the COVID-19 pandemic and the ongoing closure of the Canada–United States border. As a result of this realignment, the Hurricanes played this season in the Central Division and only played games against the other teams in their new division during the regular season and potentially the first two rounds of the playoffs.

On April 26, the Hurricanes clinched a playoff berth after a 4–3 overtime loss to the Dallas Stars. They went on to clinch their first division title since 2006. They defeated the Nashville Predators in the First Round in six games, but were defeated by the Tampa Bay Lightning in the Second Round in five games.

== Standings ==
Central Division
Pos	Team	GP	W	L	OTL	RW	GF	GA	GD	Pts
1	y – Carolina Hurricanes	56	36	12	8	27	179	136	+43	80
2	x – Florida Panthers	56	37	14	5	26	189	153	+36	79
3	x – Tampa Bay Lightning	56	36	17	3	29	181	147	+34	75
4	x – Nashville Predators	56	31	23	2	21	156	154	+2	64
5	Dallas Stars	56	23	19	14	17	158	154	+4	60
6	Chicago Blackhawks	56	24	25	7	15	161	186	−25	55
7	Detroit Red Wings	56	19	27	10	17	127	171	−44	48
8	Columbus Blue Jackets	56	18	26	12	12	137	187	−50	48

Source: National Hockey League
Rules for classification: 1) Fewer number of games played (GP, only during regular season); 2) Greater number of regulation wins (RW); 3) Greater number of wins in regulation and overtime, excluding shootout wins (ROW); 4) Greater number of total wins, including shootouts (W); 5) Greater number of points earned in head-to-head play; if teams played an uneven number of head-to-head games, the result of the first game on the home ice of the team with the extra home game is discarded; 6) Greater goal differential (GD); 7) Greater number of goals scored (GF)
x – Clinched playoff spot; y – Clinched division

== Schedule and results ==
=== Regular season ===
The regular season schedule was published on December 23, 2020.

2020–21 game log

January: 5–1–0 (Home: 3–0–0; Road: 2–1–0)
#	Date	Visitor	Score	Home	OT	Decision	Attendance	Record	Pts	Recap
1	January 14	Carolina	3–0	Detroit		Mrazek	0	1–0–0	2
2	January 16	Carolina	2–4	Detroit		Mrazek	0	1–1–0	2
3	January 18	Carolina	4–2	Nashville		Reimer	0	2–1–0	4
—	January 19	Carolina	–	Nashville	Postponed due to COVID-19. Rescheduled for March 2.
—	January 21	Florida	–	Carolina	Postponed due to COVID-19. Rescheduled for February 17.
—	January 23	Florida	–	Carolina	Postponed due to COVID-19. Rescheduled for March 7.
—	January 26	Tampa Bay	–	Carolina	Postponed due to COVID-19. Rescheduled for February 22.
4	January 28	Tampa Bay	0–1	Carolina	OT	Mrazek	0	3–1–0	6
5	January 30	Dallas	1–4	Carolina		Reimer	0	4–1–0	8
6	January 31	Dallas	3–4	Carolina	SO	Reimer	0	5–1–0	10

February: 8–5–1 (Home: 3–1–1; Road: 5–4–0)
#	Date	Visitor	Score	Home	OT	Decision	Attendance	Record	Pts	Recap
7	February 2	Carolina	4–3	Chicago	SO	Reimer	0	6–1–0	12
8	February 4	Carolina	4–6	Chicago		Reimer	0	6–2–0	12
9	February 7	Carolina	6–5	Columbus		Reimer	0	7–2–0	14
10	February 8	Carolina	2–3	Columbus		Nedeljkovic	0	7–3–0	14
11	February 11	Carolina	5–3	Dallas		Reimer	3,687	8–3–0	16
12	February 13	Carolina	4–3	Dallas	SO	Nedeljkovic	4,071	9–3–0	18
13	February 15	Columbus	3–7	Carolina		Reimer	0	10–3–0	20
14	February 17	Florida	4–3	Carolina	OT	Nedeljkovic	0	10–3–1	21
15	February 19	Chicago	3–5	Carolina		Reimer	0	11–3–1	23
16	February 20	Tampa Bay	0–4	Carolina		Nedeljkovic	0	12–3–1	25
17	February 22	Tampa Bay	4–2	Carolina		Reimer	0	12–4–1	25
18	February 24	Carolina	0–3	Tampa Bay		Nedeljkovic	500	12–5–1	25
19	February 25	Carolina	1–3	Tampa Bay		Reimer	536	12–6–1	25
20	February 27	Carolina	4–3	Florida	SO	Reimer	4,281	13–6–1	27

March: 10–2–2 (Home: 5–0–2; Road: 5–2–0)
#	Date	Visitor	Score	Home	OT	Decision	Attendance	Record	Pts	Recap
21	March 1	Carolina	3–2	Florida	OT	Nedeljkovic	3,817	14–6–1	29
22	March 2	Carolina	4–2	Nashville		Reimer	— (Note: Spectators were in attendance, but the exact number was not reported.)	15–6–1	31
23	March 4	Detroit	2–5	Carolina		Nedeljkovic	2,924	16–6–1	33
24	March 7	Florida	2–4	Carolina		Reimer	2,924	17–6–1	35
25	March 9	Nashville	2–3	Carolina	OT	Nedeljkovic	2,924	18–6–1	37
26	March 11	Nashville	1–5	Carolina		Reimer	2,924	19–6–1	39
27	March 14	Carolina	2–1	Detroit		Nedeljkovic	0	20–6–1	41
28	March 16	Carolina	2–4	Detroit		Reimer	0	20–7–1	41
29	March 18	Columbus	3–2	Carolina	OT	Nedeljkovic	2,924	20–7–2	42
30	March 20	Columbus	3–2	Carolina	SO	Reimer	2,924	20–7–3	43
31	March 22	Carolina	3–0	Columbus		Nedeljkovic	3,829	21–7–3	45
32	March 25	Carolina	4–3	Columbus	OT	Nedeljkovic	4,033	22–7–3	47
33	March 27	Tampa Bay	3–4	Carolina		Reimer	4,433	23–7–3	49
34	March 30	Carolina	1–2	Chicago		Nedeljkovic	0	23–8–3	49

April: 10–2–4 (Home: 6–2–1; Road: 4–0–3)
#	Date	Visitor	Score	Home	OT	Decision	Attendance	Record	Pts	Recap
35	April 1	Carolina	4–3	Chicago		Reimer	0	24–8–3	51
36	April 3	Dallas	3–2	Carolina		Nedeljkovic	4,987	24–9–3	51
37	April 4	Dallas	0–1	Carolina		Mrazek	4,987	25–9–3	53
38	April 6	Florida	2–5	Carolina		Mrazek	4,987	26–9–3	55
39	April 8	Florida	0–3	Carolina		Nedeljkovic	4,987	27–9–3	57
40	April 10	Detroit	5–4	Carolina	SO	Mrazek	4,987	27–9–4	58
41	April 12	Detroit	3–1	Carolina		Reimer	4,987	27–10–4	58
42	April 15	Nashville	1–4	Carolina		Mrazek	4,987	28–10–4	60
43	April 17	Nashville	1–3	Carolina		Nedeljkovic	4,987	29–10–4	62
44	April 19	Carolina	2–3	Tampa Bay	OT	Mrazek	3,800	29–10–5	63
45	April 20	Carolina	4–1	Tampa Bay		Nedeljkovic	3,800	30–10–5	65
46	April 22	Carolina	4–2	Florida		Nedeljkovic	4,683	31–10–5	67
47	April 24	Carolina	3–4	Florida	OT	Nedeljkovic	4,838	31–10–6	68
48	April 26	Carolina	3–4	Dallas	OT	Reimer	5,364	31–10–7	69
49	April 27	Carolina	5–1	Dallas		Nedeljkovic	6,014	32–10–7	71
50	April 29	Detroit	1–3	Carolina		Reimer	4,987	33–10–7	73

May: 3–2–1 (Home: 3–0–1; Road: 0–2–0)
#	Date	Visitor	Score	Home	OT	Decision	Attendance	Record	Pts	Recap
51	May 1	Columbus	1–2	Carolina	OT	Nedeljkovic	4,987	34–10–7	75
52	May 3	Chicago	2–5	Carolina		Nedeljkovic	4,987	35–10–7	77
53	May 4	Chicago	3–6	Carolina		Mrazek	4,987	36–10–7	79
54	May 6	Chicago	2–1	Carolina	OT	Mrazek	4,987	36–10–8	80
55	May 8	Carolina	1–3	Nashville		Nedeljkovic	—	36–11–8	80
56	May 10	Carolina	0–5	Nashville		Mrazek	—	36–12–8	80

Legend: Win (2 points) Loss (0 points) Overtime/shootout loss (1 point) Postponement

=== Playoffs ===
2021 Stanley Cup playoffs

Central Division First Round vs. (C4) Nashville Predators: Carolina won 4–2
#	Date	Visitor	Score	Home	OT	Decision	Attendance	Series	Recap
1	May 17	Nashville	2–5	Carolina		Nedeljkovic	12,000	1–0
2	May 19	Nashville	0–3	Carolina		Nedeljkovic	12,000	2–0
3	May 21	Carolina	4–5	Nashville	2OT	Nedeljkovic	12,135	2–1
4	May 23	Carolina	3–4	Nashville	2OT	Nedeljkovic	12,135	2–2
5	May 25	Nashville	2–3	Carolina	OT	Nedeljkovic	12,000	3–2
6	May 27	Carolina	4–3	Nashville	OT	Nedeljkovic	14,107	4–2

Central Division Second Round vs. (C3) Tampa Bay Lightning: Tampa Bay won 4–1
#	Date	Visitor	Score	Home	OT	Decision	Attendance	Series	Recap
1	May 30	Tampa Bay	2–1	Carolina		Nedeljkovic	16,299	0–1
2	June 1	Tampa Bay	2–1	Carolina		Nedeljkovic	16,299	0–2
3	June 3	Carolina	3–2	Tampa Bay	OT	Mrazek	13,544	1–2
4	June 5	Carolina	4–6	Tampa Bay		Mrazek	13,773	1–3
5	June 8	Tampa Bay	2–0	Carolina		Nedeljkovic	16,299	1–4

Legend: Win Loss
