= 2020–21 Dallas Stars season =

Season of play of professional ice hockey team

2020–21 Dallas Stars
- Division: 5th Central
- 2020–21 record: 23–19–14
- Home record: 13–7–8
- Road record: 10–12–6
- Goals for: 158
- Goals against: 154

Team information
- General manager: Jim Nill
- Coach: Rick Bowness
- Captain: Jamie Benn
- Alternate captains: Blake Comeau; John Klingberg; Esa Lindell; Tyler Seguin
- Arena: American Airlines Center
- Minor league affiliates: Texas Stars (AHL); Idaho Steelheads (ECHL)

Team leaders
- Goals: Joe Pavelski (25)
- Assists: John Klingberg (29)
- Points: Joe Pavelski (51)
- Penalty minutes: Blake Comeau (37)
- Plus/minus: Joe Pavelski (+22)
- Wins: Anton Khudobin (12)
- Goals against average: Jake Oettinger (2.36)

The 2020–21 Dallas Stars season was the 54th season for National Hockey League franchise that was established on June 5, 1967, and the 28th season since the franchise relocated from Minnesota prior to the start of the 1993–94 NHL season. On December 20, 2020, the league temporarily realigned into four divisions with no conferences due to the COVID-19 pandemic and the ongoing closure of the Canada–United States border. As a result of this realignment, the Stars remained in the Central Division this season and played games against only the other teams in their realigned division during the regular season.

The Stars experienced a COVID-19 outbreak during training camp, with 17 team members testing positive. The team's first four games were postponed. The Stars finally began the season on a high note eight days late on January 22, 2021, with a 7–0 rout of the Nashville Predators.

On May 8, the Stars were eliminated from playoff contention after the Nashville Predators defeated the Carolina Hurricanes 3–1, becoming the first team since the 2014–15 Los Angeles Kings to miss the playoffs after making the Stanley Cup Final the year prior.

== Standings ==
Central Division
Pos	Team	GP	W	L	OTL	RW	GF	GA	GD	Pts
1	y – Carolina Hurricanes	56	36	12	8	27	179	136	+43	80
2	x – Florida Panthers	56	37	14	5	26	189	153	+36	79
3	x – Tampa Bay Lightning	56	36	17	3	29	181	147	+34	75
4	x – Nashville Predators	56	31	23	2	21	156	154	+2	64
5	Dallas Stars	56	23	19	14	17	158	154	+4	60
6	Chicago Blackhawks	56	24	25	7	15	161	186	−25	55
7	Detroit Red Wings	56	19	27	10	17	127	171	−44	48
8	Columbus Blue Jackets	56	18	26	12	12	137	187	−50	48

Source: National Hockey League
Rules for classification: 1) Fewer number of games played (GP, only during regular season); 2) Greater number of regulation wins (RW); 3) Greater number of wins in regulation and overtime, excluding shootout wins (ROW); 4) Greater number of total wins, including shootouts (W); 5) Greater number of points earned in head-to-head play; if teams played an uneven number of head-to-head games, the result of the first game on the home ice of the team with the extra home game is discarded; 6) Greater goal differential (GD); 7) Greater number of goals scored (GF)
x – Clinched playoff spot; y – Clinched division

== Schedule and results ==
=== Regular season ===
The regular season schedule was published on December 23, 2020.

2020–21 game log

January: 4–1–1 (Home: 4–0–0; Road: 0–1–1)
#	Date	Visitor	Score	Home	OT	Decision	Attendance	Record	Pts	Recap
—	January 14	Dallas	–	Florida	Postponed due to COVID-19. Rescheduled for February 22.
—	January 15	Dallas	–	Florida	Postponed due to COVID-19. Rescheduled for May 3.
—	January 17	Dallas	–	Tampa Bay	Postponed due to COVID-19. Rescheduled for May 5.
—	January 19	Dallas	–	Tampa Bay	Postponed due to COVID-19. Rescheduled for May 7.
1	January 22	Nashville	0–7	Dallas		Khudobin	4,214	1–0–0	2
2	January 24	Nashville	2–3	Dallas		Khudobin	4,056	2–0–0	4
3	January 26	Detroit	1–2	Dallas	OT	Khudobin	4,109	3–0–0	6
4	January 28	Detroit	3–7	Dallas		Oettinger	4,214	4–0–0	8
5	January 30	Dallas	1–4	Carolina		Khudobin	0	4–1–0	8
6	January 31	Dallas	3–4	Carolina	SO	Khudobin	0	4–1–1	9

February: 2–5–3 (Home: 0–1–3; Road: 2–4–0)
#	Date	Visitor	Score	Home	OT	Decision	Attendance	Record	Pts	Recap
7	February 2	Dallas	6–3	Columbus		Oettinger	0	5–1–1	11
8	February 4	Dallas	3–4	Columbus		Khudobin	0	5–2–1	11
9	February 7	Chicago	2–1	Dallas	OT	Oettinger	4,203	5–2–2	12
10	February 9	Chicago	2–1	Dallas	OT	Oettinger	4,059	5–2–3	13
11	February 11	Carolina	5–3	Dallas		Khudobin	3,687	5–3–3	13
12	February 13	Carolina	4–3	Dallas	SO	Oettinger	4,071	5–3–4	14
—	February 15	Nashville	–	Dallas	Postponed due to winter storm. Rescheduled for March 7.
—	February 16	Nashville	–	Dallas	Postponed due to winter storm. Rescheduled for March 21.
—	February 18	Tampa Bay	–	Dallas	Postponed due to winter storm. Rescheduled for March 2.
—	February 20	Tampa Bay	–	Dallas	Postponed due to winter storm. Rescheduled for March 16.
13	February 22	Dallas	1–3	Florida		Khudobin	3,510	5–4–4	14
14 (Note: The following game have been rescheduled: Dallas at Florida originally scheduled for February 23, is now scheduled for February 24.)	February 24	Dallas	3–0	Florida		Khudobin	3,324	6–4–4	16
15	February 25	Dallas	2–3	Florida		Oettinger	3,844	6–5–4	16
16	February 27	Dallas	0–5	Tampa Bay		Khudobin	537	6–6–4	16

March: 5–6–6 (Home: 3–5–4; Road: 2–1–2)
#	Date	Visitor	Score	Home	OT	Decision	Attendance	Record	Pts	Recap
17	March 2	Tampa Bay	2–0	Dallas		Khudobin	4,067	6–7–4	16
18	March 4	Columbus	3–2	Dallas		Khudobin	4,112	6–8–4	16
19	March 6	Columbus	0–5	Dallas		Oettinger	4,203	7–8–4	18
20	March 7	Nashville	4–3	Dallas	SO	Oettinger	3,976	7–8–5	19
21	March 9	Chicago	1–6	Dallas		Khudobin	4,211	8–8–5	21
22	March 11	Chicago	4–2	Dallas		Khudobin	4,213	8–9–5	21
23	March 13	Dallas	3–4	Columbus	OT	Oettinger	4,160	8–9–6	22
24 (Note: The following games have been rescheduled: Dallas at Columbus originally scheduled for March 15, is now scheduled for March 14.; Dallas at Nashville originally scheduled for April 29, is now scheduled for April 11.; Dallas at Tampa Bay originally scheduled for March 1, is now scheduled for April 29.; Dallas at Chicago originally scheduled for May 6, is now scheduled for May 9.; Dallas at Chicago originally scheduled for May 8, is now scheduled for May 10.)	March 14	Dallas	2–1	Columbus	SO	Oettinger	3,992	9–9–6	24
25	March 16	Tampa Bay	4–3	Dallas	SO	Oettinger	4,057	9–9–7	25
26	March 18	Dallas	2–3	Detroit		Oettinger	0	9–10–7	25
27	March 20	Dallas	3–0	Detroit		Khudobin	0	10–10–7	27
28	March 21	Nashville	4–3	Dallas	SO	Khudobin	4,011	10–10–8	28
29	March 23	Tampa Bay	2–1	Dallas		Khudobin	4,103	10–11–8	28
30	March 25	Tampa Bay	3–4	Dallas		Oettinger	4,187	11–11–8	30
31	March 27	Florida	4–3	Dallas	OT	Khudobin	4,209	11–11–9	31
32	March 28	Florida	4–1	Dallas		Oettinger	4,026	11–12–9	31
33	March 30	Dallas	2–3	Nashville	OT	Khudobin	— (Note: Spectators were in attendance, but the exact number was not reported.)	11–12–10	32

April: 10–5–2 (Home: 6–1–1; Road: 4–4–1)
#	Date	Visitor	Score	Home	OT	Decision	Attendance	Record	Pts	Recap
34	April 1	Dallas	4–1	Nashville		Khudobin	—	12–12–10	34
35	April 3	Dallas	3–2	Carolina		Oettinger	4,987	13–12–10	36
36	April 4	Dallas	0–1	Carolina		Oettinger	4,987	13–13–10	36
37	April 6	Dallas	2–4	Chicago		Oettinger	0	13–14–10	36
38	April 8	Dallas	5–1	Chicago		Khudobin	0	14–14–10	38
39	April 10	Florida	1–4	Dallas		Khudobin	4,165	15–14–10	40
40	April 11	Dallas	2–3	Nashville	SO	Khudobin	—	15–14–11	41
41	April 13	Florida	3–2	Dallas	OT	Khudobin	4,199	15–14–12	42
42	April 15	Columbus	1–4	Dallas		Oettinger	4,201	16–14–12	44
43	April 17	Columbus	1–5	Dallas		Oettinger	5,643	17–14–12	46
44	April 19	Detroit	2–3	Dallas	SO	Khudobin	4,812	18–14–12	48
45	April 20	Detroit	2–5	Dallas		Oettinger	5,148	19–14–12	50
46	April 22	Dallas	3–7	Detroit		Oettinger	0	19–15–12	50
47	April 24	Dallas	2–1	Detroit	OT	Khudobin	0	20–15–12	52
48	April 26	Carolina	3–4	Dallas	OT	Oettinger	5,364	21–15–12	54
49	April 27	Carolina	5–1	Dallas		Khudobin	6,014	21–16–12	54
50	April 29	Dallas	0–3	Tampa Bay		Oettinger	4,200	21–17–12	54

May: 2–2–2 (Home: 0–0–0; Road: 2–2–2)
#	Date	Visitor	Score	Home	OT	Decision	Attendance	Record	Pts	Recap
51	May 1	Dallas	0–1	Nashville	OT	Khudobin	—	21–17–13	55
52	May 3	Dallas	4–5	Florida	OT	Oettinger	4,702	21–17–14	56
53	May 5	Dallas	2–6	Tampa Bay		Oettinger	4,200	21–18–14	56
54	May 7	Dallas	5–2	Tampa Bay		Khudobin	4,200	22–18–14	58
55	May 9	Dallas	2–4	Chicago		Khudobin	3,820	22–19–14	58
56	May 10	Dallas	5–4	Chicago	OT	Oettinger	3,917	23–19–14	60

Legend: Win (2 points) Loss (0 points) Overtime/shootout loss (1 point) Postponement

== Player statistics ==
=== Skaters ===
Regular season
Player	GP	G	A	Pts	+/−	PIM
Joe Pavelski	56	25	26	51	22	16
Jason Robertson	51	17	28	45	13	16
Roope Hintz	41	15	28	43	13	4
John Klingberg	53	7	29	36	-15	23
Jamie Benn	52	11	24	35	13	33
Denis Gurianov	55	12	18	30	0	21
Miro Heiskanen	55	8	19	27	-9	12
Esa Lindell	56	5	11	16	11	19
Jason Dickinson	51	7	8	15	-2	18
Jamie Oleksiak	56	6	8	14	-3	35
Radek Faksa	55	6	8	14	-15	30
Blake Comeau	51	4	10	14	-13	37
Alexander Radulov	11	4	8	12	9	6
Joel Kiviranta	26	6	5	11	3	6
Andrew Cogliano	54	5	6	11	-8	24
Tanner Kero	39	3	7	10	0	6
Joel Hanley	35	0	8	8	6	2
Andrej Sekera	46	3	2	5	12	4
Ty Dellandrea	26	3	2	5	0	23
Justin Dowling	27	1	4	5	-4	6
Mark Pysyk	36	3	1	4	6	20
Joel L'Esperance	12	2	0	2	-2	2
Tyler Seguin	3	2	0	2	0	0
Rhett Gardner	28	1	1	2	-9	8
Nick Caamano	24	0	1	1	-7	17
Sami Vatanen^{†}	9	0	0	0	1	2

=== Goaltenders ===
Regular season
Player	GP	GS	TOI	W	L	OT	GA	GAA	SA	SV%	SO	G	A	PIM
Jake Oettinger	29	24	1,605	11	8	7	63	2.36	710	.911	1	0	1	4
Anton Khudobin	32	32	1,795	12	11	7	76	2.54	799	.905	3	0	2	2

^{†}Denotes player spent time with another team before joining the Stars. Stats reflect time with the Stars only.
^{‡}Denotes player was traded mid-season. Stats reflect time with the Stars only.
Bold/italics denotes franchise record.

== Draft picks ==
Below are the Dallas Stars' selections at the 2020 NHL entry draft, which was originally scheduled for June 26–27, 2020 at the Bell Center in Montreal, Quebec, but was postponed on March 25, 2020, due to the COVID-19 pandemic. It was instead held on October 6–7, 2020, virtually via video conference call from the NHL Network studio in Secaucus, New Jersey.

Round	#	Player	Pos	Nationality	College/Junior/Club team (League)
1	30	Mavrik Bourque	C	Canada	Shawinigan Cataractes (QMJHL)
4	123	Antonio Stranges	LW	United States	London Knights (OHL)
5	154	Daniel Ljungman	C	Sweden	Linkopings HC (SHL)
6	162	Evgeniy Oksentyuk	LW	Belarus	Flint Firebirds (OHL)
6	185	Remi Poirier	G	Canada	Gatineau Olympiques (QMJHL)
