= Alex Nedeljkovic =

American ice hockey player (born 1996)

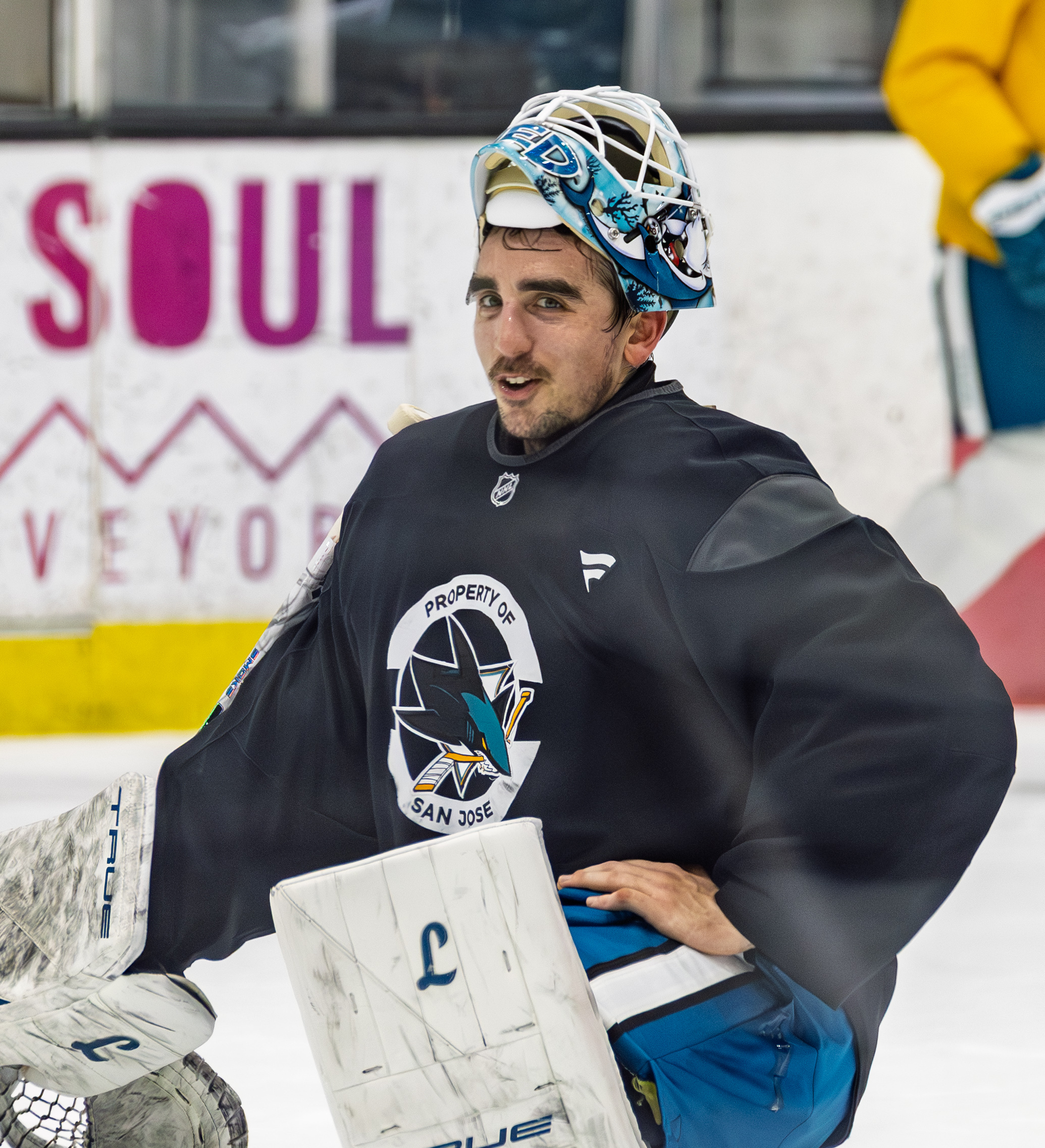
- Nedeljkovic with the San Jose Sharks in April 2026
- Born: January 7, 1996 (age 30) Parma, Ohio, U.S.
- Height: 6 ft 0 in (183 cm)
- Weight: 205 lb (93 kg; 14 st 9 lb)
- Position: Goaltender
- Catches: Left
- NHL team Former teams: San Jose Sharks; Carolina Hurricanes; Detroit Red Wings; Pittsburgh Penguins
- National team: United States
- NHL draft: 37th overall, 2014; Carolina Hurricanes
- Playing career: 2015–present

Alexander Nedeljkovic (born January 7, 1996) is an American professional ice hockey player who is a goaltender for the San Jose Sharks of the National Hockey League (NHL). Nedeljkovic was selected by the Carolina Hurricanes in the second round (37th overall) of the 2014 NHL entry draft.

== Early life ==
Nedeljkovic is of Serbian descent. His grandparents are from a village near the town of Ljubovija, Serbia. The back plate of his mask has a Serbian cross, an homage to both his Serbian descent and his Orthodox faith. Nedeljkovic is the oldest of four children, with one younger brother and two younger sisters. His mother is a nurse and he is reportedly unsure of what his fathers profession is.

== Playing career ==
=== Junior ===
Nedeljkovic grew up in Cleveland, where he played for the Cleveland Junior Barons bantam AAA team, and played with them in the 2009 Quebec International Pee-Wee Hockey Tournament.

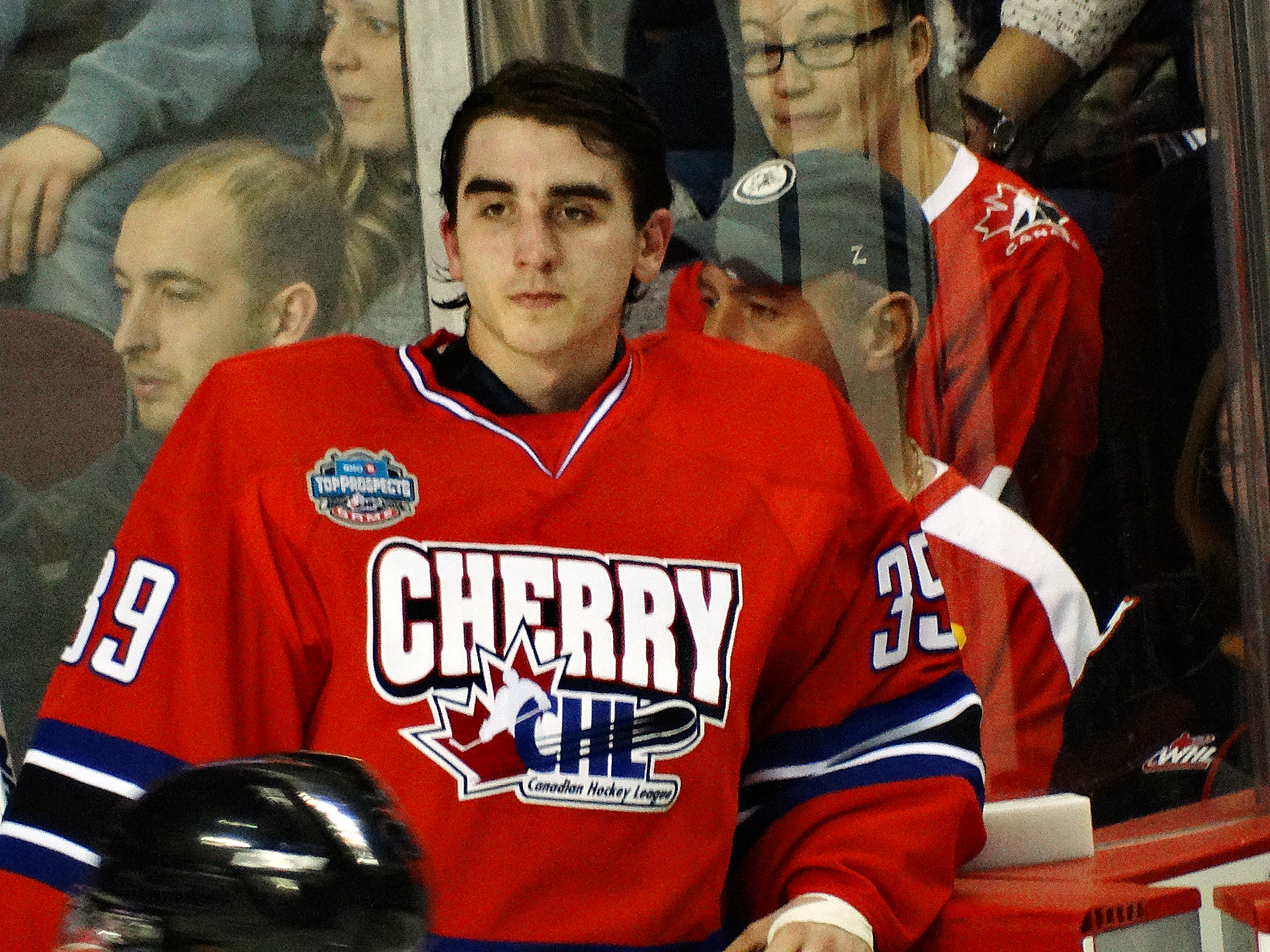
Nedeljkovic at the 2014 CHL/NHL Top Prospects Game.

Nedeljkovic started his major junior play in 2012 in the Ontario Hockey League (OHL) with the Plymouth Whalers, where in his rookie season he posted a goals against average of 2.28 to win the F. W. "Dinty" Moore Trophy, and was also named to the 2012–13 OHL First All-Rookie Team. The following season, Nedeljkovic was selected to play in both the CCM/USA Hockey All-American Prospects Game and the 2014 CHL/NHL Top Prospects Game.

=== Professional ===
==== Carolina Hurricanes ====
At the conclusion of the 2014–15 season with the Whalers, Nedeljkovic signed a three-year, entry-level contract with the Carolina Hurricanes on March 27, 2015. He was assigned to the ECHL affiliate, the Florida Everblades, to make his professional debut in the final regular season games.

During his final season of junior in the 2015–16 season, Nedeljkovic was traded by the Flint Firebirds, along with fellow Hurricanes draft pick Josh Wesley, to the Niagara IceDogs in exchange for goaltender Brent Moran in November 2015.

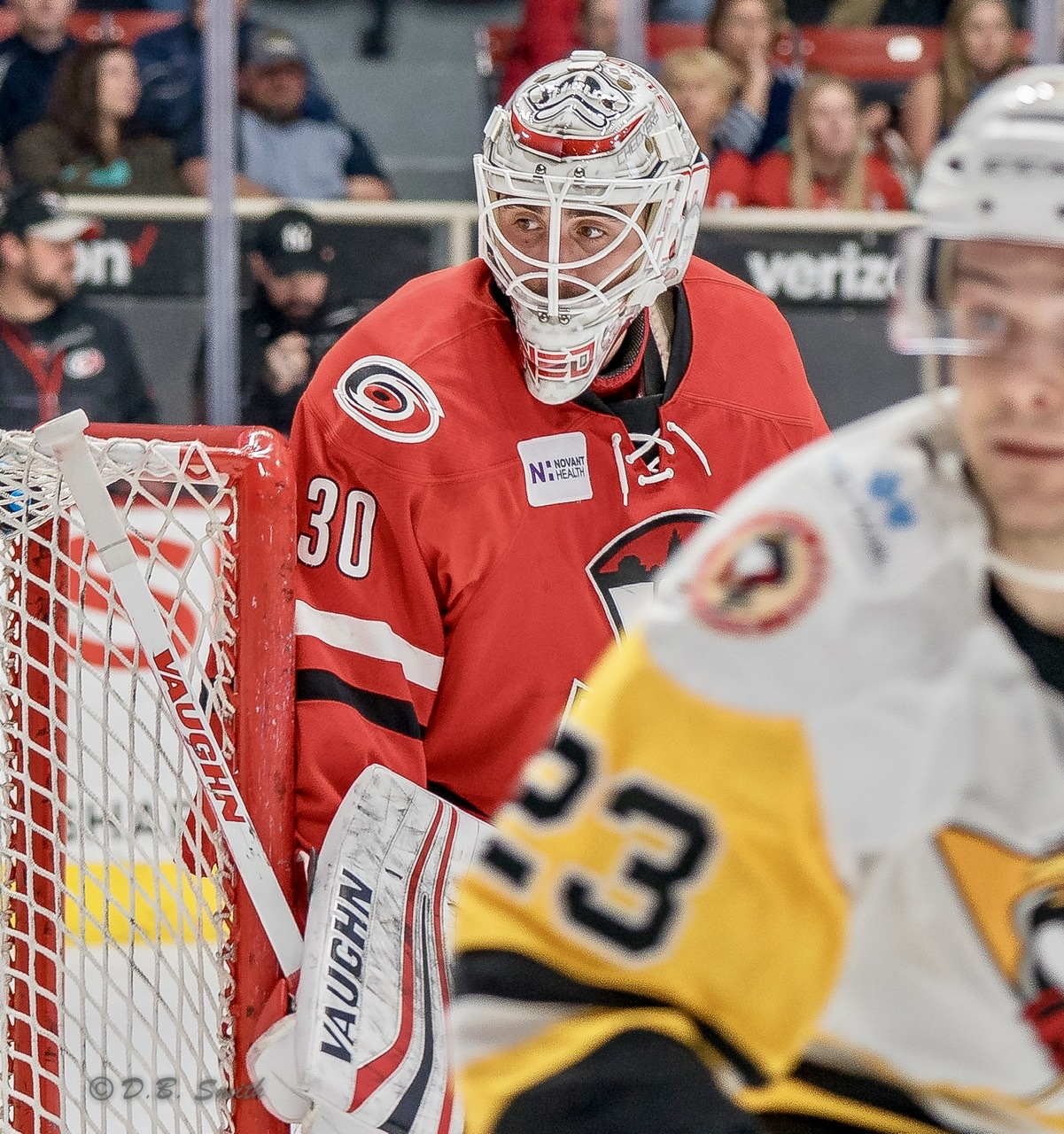
Nedeljkovic in a game against Wilkes-Barre/Scranton in 2018

In his rookie professional season in 2016–17, on December 30, 2016, while playing for the Florida Everblades, Nedeljkovic became the 12th ECHL goaltender to score a goal. On January 17, 2017, Nedeljkovic played his first NHL game, in relief of starter Cam Ward against the Columbus Blue Jackets.

During the 2017–18 season, on March 10, 2018, while playing for the Charlotte Checkers in a game against the Hartford Wolf Pack, Nedeljkovic became the 13th goaltender in the American Hockey League (AHL) history to score a goal.

After starting the 2018–19 season with the Checkers, Nedeljkovic was recalled to the NHL on January 17, 2019. On January 23, against the Vancouver Canucks, he made his first NHL start in which he made 24 saves on 26 shots to secure his first win in the NHL.

On June 28, 2019, Nedeljkovic signed a two-year contract extension with the Hurricanes.

In the pandemic-delayed 2020–21 season, Nedeljkovic remained with the Hurricanes due to the expanded roster, and responded with a break-out season in the NHL. On February 20, 2021, in a 4–0 victory over the Tampa Bay Lightning, Nedeljkovic recorded his first career NHL shutout. On April 1, Nedeljkovic was named NHL's Rookie of the Month for games played in March. In 23 regular season games, he posted a 15–5–3 record for the division-leading Carolina and tied for the NHL rookie lead in shutouts alongside Ilya Sorokin with three. Nedeljkovic recorded a 1.90 goals-against average and .932 save percentage to led all NHL goaltenders who played at least 20 games. On May 17, Nedeljkovic got his first Stanley Cup playoffs win with a 5–2 win over the Nashville Predators. On May 19, Nedeljkovic recorded his first Stanley Cup playoffs shutout with a 3–0 victory over the Predators. He collected four wins in nine postseason games, unable to help propel the Hurricanes past the second-round. In June 2021, Nedeljkovic was a finalist for the Calder Memorial Trophy, given to the NHL's rookie of the year, placing third behind Kirill Kaprizov and Jason Robertson, and was named to the NHL All-Rookie Team.

==== Detroit Red Wings ====
As a restricted free agent, unable to agree to terms on a new contract with the Hurricanes, Nedeljkovic was traded to the Detroit Red Wings in exchange for Jonathan Bernier and a third-round pick in 2021 on July 22, 2021. He was immediately signed to a two-year, $6 million contract by the Red Wings.

Nedeljkovic recorded his first shutout as a member of the Red Wings on January 15, 2022, over the Buffalo Sabres with several family members in attendance at Little Caesars Arena. After a strong fall start to his first season with the Red Wings, Nedeljkovic struggled in the New Year, having gone 2–5–1, with a 4.64 goals against average and .849 save percentage in his previous nine appearances by the beginning of March. He made headlines on March 10, when he accidentally scored an own goal by sweeping into the net a puck that had been traveling wide of it, dubbed a "gaffe for the ages" by the Detroit Free Press.

==== Pittsburgh Penguins ====
On July 1, 2023, Nedeljkovic signed a one-year, $1.5 million contract with the Pittsburgh Penguins. On November 17, during a rehab stint with the Wilkes-Barre/Scranton Penguins, Nedeljkovic scored his second goal at the AHL level in a 4–2 road win over the Providence Bruins. He became the first goaltender in AHL history to score two or more career goals.

On June 20, 2024, the Penguins re-signed Nedeljkovic to a two-year, $5 million contract extension with an annual average of $2.5 million.

On January 17, 2025, Nedeljkovic scored his first career NHL goal in a 5–2 victory against the Buffalo Sabres and became the 16th NHL goaltender to do so. He also became the first goaltender in NHL history to score a goal and record an assist in the same game, as well as the only goaltender to score a goal in the NHL, AHL and ECHL.

==== San Jose Sharks ====
Nedeljkovic was traded to the San Jose Sharks in return for a 2028 third-round draft pick on July 1, 2025.

During a January 19, 2026, game against the Florida Panthers, Nedeljkovic fought Panthers' goaltender Sergei Bobrovsky during the third period after the Panthers' Evan Rodrigues checked Vincent Desharnais from behind. It was the first NHL goaltender fight since 2020 when Mike Smith fought Cam Talbot. In March 2026, he signed a two-year contract extension.

== International play ==
Nedeljkovic won a silver medal with the United States under-18 team at the 2013 Ivan Hlinka Memorial Tournament.

== Personal life ==
Nedeljkovic is married to his wife, Emma is a nurse and the pair met when he was playing for the Niagara IceDogs in the Ontario Hockey League. Their son was born in early 2024.

Nedeljkovic expressed his desire to get his pilot's license after flying with the Blue Angels in the summer of 2022 at the Thunder Over Michigan Air Show.

== Career statistics ==
=== Regular season and playoffs ===
			Regular season									Playoffs
Season	Team	League	GP	W	L	T/OT	MIN	GA	SO	GAA	SV%	GP	W	L	MIN	GA	SO	GAA	SV%
2012–13	Plymouth Whalers	OHL	26	19	2	2	1,371	52	2	2.28	.923	15	9	4	864	39	1	2.71	.908
2013–14	Plymouth Whalers	OHL	61	26	27	7	3,436	165	1	2.88	.925	5	1	4	272	20	0	4.41	.905
2014–15	Plymouth Whalers	OHL	55	20	28	7	3,206	167	5	3.13	.916	—	—	—	—	—	—	—	—
2014–15	Florida Everblades	ECHL	3	2	1	0	178	10	0	3.38	.841	—	—	—	—	—	—	—	—
2015–16	Flint Firebirds	OHL	19	9	7	2	1,122	60	1	3.21	.907	—	—	—	—	—	—	—	—
2015–16	Niagara IceDogs	OHL	30	15	13	2	1,766	80	1	2.72	.907	17	12	4	1,026	48	0	2.81	.903
2016–17	Charlotte Checkers	AHL	25	8	14	1	1,287	73	1	3.40	.881	—	—	—	—	—	—	—	—
2016–17	Carolina Hurricanes	NHL	1	0	0	0	30	0	0	0.00	1.000	—	—	—	—	—	—	—	—
2016–17	Florida Everblades	ECHL	12	6	4	0	565	28	1	2.97	.903	7	1	5	406	13	0	1.92	.930
2017–18	Charlotte Checkers	AHL	49	31	12	5	2,726	116	5	2.55	.903	8	4	4	541	19	1	2.11	.919
2018–19	Charlotte Checkers	AHL	51	34	9	5	2,917	110	4	2.26	.916	15	10	4	897	35	1	2.34	.916
2018–19	Carolina Hurricanes	NHL	1	1	0	0	60	2	0	2.00	.923	—	—	—	—	—	—	—	—
2019–20	Charlotte Checkers	AHL	29	16	10	2	1,661	69	4	2.49	.906	—	—	—	—	—	—	—	—
2019–20	Carolina Hurricanes	NHL	4	1	2	1	217	11	0	3.05	.887	—	—	—	—	—	—	—	—
2020–21	Carolina Hurricanes	NHL	23	15	5	3	1,393	44	3	1.90	.932	9	4	5	608	22	1	2.17	.920
2021–22	Detroit Red Wings	NHL	59	20	24	9	3,231	178	4	3.31	.901	—	—	—	—	—	—	—	—
2022–23	Detroit Red Wings	NHL	15	5	7	2	833	49	0	3.53	.895	—	—	—	—	—	—	—	—
2022–23	Grand Rapids Griffins	AHL	26	13	9	3	1,459	66	1	2.71	.912	—	—	—	—	—	—	—	—
2023–24	Pittsburgh Penguins	NHL	38	18	7	7	2060	102	1	2.97	.902	—	—	—	—	—	—	—	—
2023–24	Wilkes-Barre/Scranton Penguins	AHL	1	1	0	0	60	2	0	2.00	.895	—	—	—	—	—	—	—	—
2024–25	Wilkes-Barre/Scranton Penguins	AHL	1	1	0	0	60	3	0	3.00	.917	—	—	—	—	—	—	—	—
2024–25	Pittsburgh Penguins	NHL	38	14	15	5	2151	112	1	3.12	.894	—	—	—	—	—	—	—	—
2025-26	San Jose Sharks	NHL	40	18	14	4	370	109	0	2.87	.896	—	—	—	—	—	—	—	—
NHL totals			219	92	74	31	12,251	607	9	2.98	.902	9	4	5	608	22	1	2.17	.920

=== International ===
Year	Team	Event	Result	GP	W	L	T	MIN	GA	SO	GAA	SV%
2014	United States	U18	1st place, gold medalist(s)	6	5	1	0	360	11	1	1.84	.902
2016	United States	WJC	3rd place, bronze medalist(s)	7	4	2	0	420	9	1	1.66	.943
2024	United States	WC	5th	3	2	0	0	148	5	1	2.02	.875
Junior totals				13	9	3	0	780	20	2	1.54	.923
Senior totals				3	2	0	0	148	5	1	2.02	.875

== Awards and honors ==
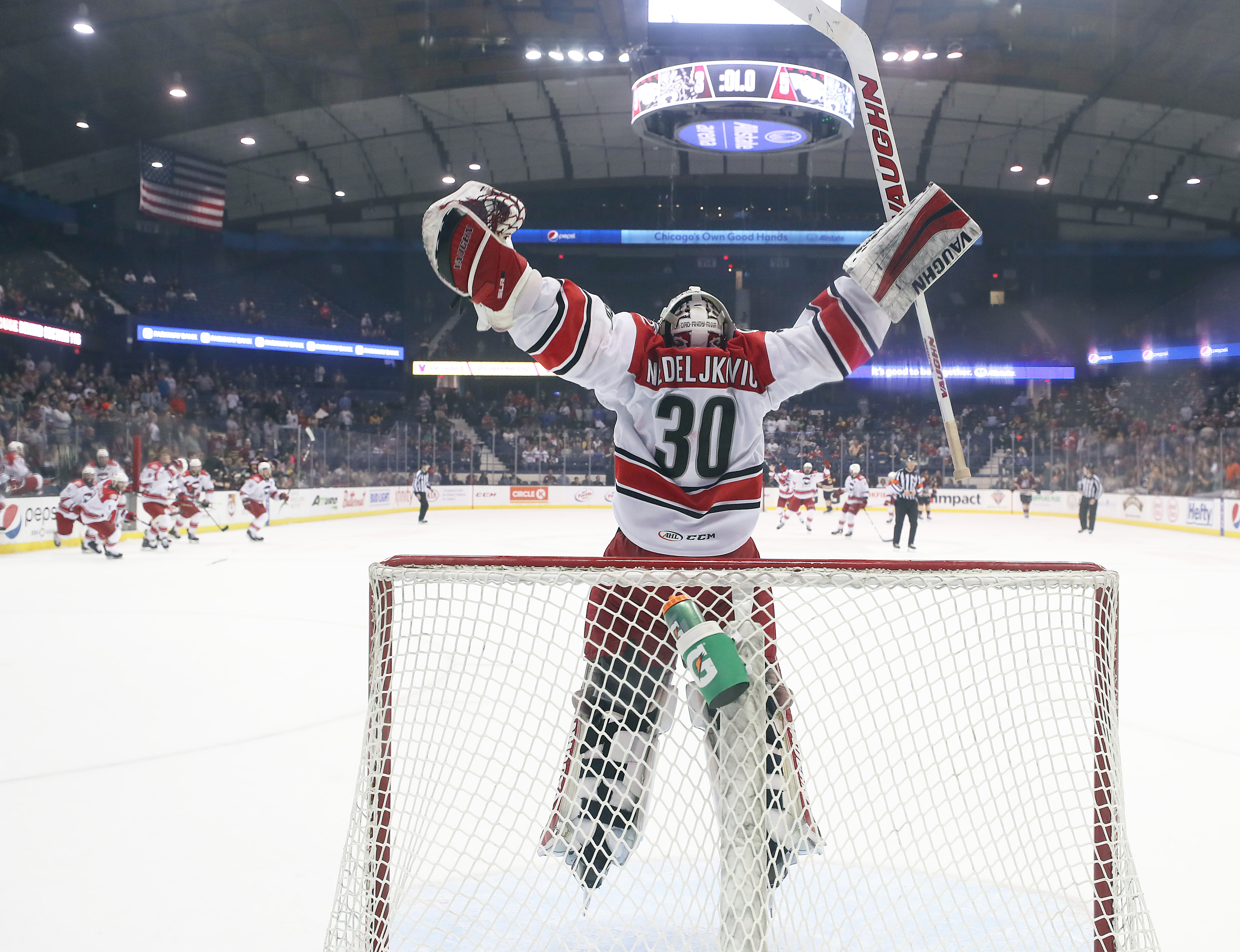
Nedeljkovic winning the Calder Cup with the Checkers.

Award	Year	Ref
OHL
First All-Rookie Team	2012–13	
F. W. "Dinty" Moore Trophy	2012–13	
CCM/USA Hockey All-American Top Prospects Game	2013	
CHL/NHL Top Prospects Game	2014	
Goaltender of the Year	2013–14	
First All-Star Team	2013–14	
AHL
Aldege "Baz" Bastien Memorial Award	2018–19	
First All-Star Team	2018–19	
Calder Cup champion	2019	
All-Star Game	2020	
NHL
Rookie of the Month	March 2021	
All-Rookie Team	2020–21	

Honors

- Only goaltender to score a goal in the NHL, AHL, and ECHL.
- Only goaltender to score a goal and get an assist in the same game.

Awards and achievements
Preceded by Garret Sparks	Aldege "Baz" Bastien Memorial Award; 2018–19	Succeeded by Kaapo Kähkönen
