= List of Florida Panthers seasons =

The Florida Panthers are a professional ice hockey team based in the Miami metropolitan area. The team is a member of the Atlantic Division of the Eastern Conference of the National Hockey League (NHL). Since their inception in 1993, the Panthers have reached the Stanley Cup Final four times, winning it twice in 2024 and 2025.

== Table key ==
Key of colors and symbols
Color/symbol	Explanation
†	Stanley Cup champions
‡	Conference champions
↑	Division champions
#	Led league in points

Key of terms and abbreviations
Term or abbreviation	Definition
Finish	Final position in division or league standings
GP	Number of games played
W	Number of wins
L	Number of losses
T	Number of ties
OT	Number of losses in overtime (since the 1999–2000 season)
Pts	Number of points
GF	Goals for (goals scored by the Panthers)
GA	Goals against (goals scored by the Panthers' opponents)
—	Does not apply

== Year by year ==
Year-by-Year Florida Panthers Seasons
Season	Panthers season	Conference	Division	Regular season									Postseason					
Season	Panthers season	Conference	Division	Finish	GP	W	L	T	OT	Pts	GF	GA	GP	W	L	GF	GA	Result
1993–94	1993–94	Eastern	Atlantic	5th	84	33	34	17	—	83	233	233	—	—	—	—	—	Did not qualify
1994–95^{1}	1994–95	Eastern	Atlantic	5th	48	20	22	6	—	46	115	127	—	—	—	—	—	Did not qualify
1995–96	1995–96	Eastern‡	Atlantic	3rd	82	41	31	10	—	92	254	234	22	12	10	61	57	Won in conference quarterfinals, 4–1 (Bruins); Won in conference semifinals, 4–2 (Flyers); Won in conference finals, 4–3 (Penguins); Lost in Stanley Cup Final, 0–4 (Avalanche)
1996–97	1996–97	Eastern	Atlantic	3rd	82	35	28	19	—	89	221	201	5	1	4	10	13	Lost in conference quarterfinals, 1–4 (Rangers)
1997–98	1997–98	Eastern	Atlantic	6th	82	24	43	15	—	63	203	256	—	—	—	—	—	Did not qualify
1998–99	1998–99	Eastern	Southeast	2nd	82	30	34	18	—	78	210	228	—	—	—	—	—	Did not qualify
1999–2000	1999–2000	Eastern	Southeast	2nd	82	43	27	6	6	98	244	209	4	0	4	6	12	Lost in conference quarterfinals, 0–4 (Devils)
2000–01	2000–01	Eastern	Southeast	3rd	82	22	38	13	9	66	200	246	—	—	—	—	—	Did not qualify
2001–02	2001–02	Eastern	Southeast	4th	82	22	44	10	6	60	180	250	—	—	—	—	—	Did not qualify
2002–03	2002–03	Eastern	Southeast	4th	82	24	36	13	9	70	176	237	—	—	—	—	—	Did not qualify
2003–04	2003–04	Eastern	Southeast	4th	82	28	35	15	4	75	188	221	—	—	—	—	—	Did not qualify
2004–05^{2}	2004–05	Season cancelled due to 2004–05 NHL lockout																
2005–06^{3}	2005–06	Eastern	Southeast	4th	82	37	34	—	11	85	236	252	—	—	—	—	—	Did not qualify
2006–07	2006–07	Eastern	Southeast	4th	82	35	31	—	16	86	245	249	—	—	—	—	—	Did not qualify
2007–08	2007–08	Eastern	Southeast	3rd	82	38	35	—	9	85	211	220	—	—	—	—	—	Did not qualify
2008–09	2008–09	Eastern	Southeast	3rd	82	41	30	—	11	93	231	223	—	—	—	—	—	Did not qualify
2009–10	2009–10	Eastern	Southeast	5th	82	32	37	—	13	77	202	234	—	—	—	—	—	Did not qualify
2010–11	2010–11	Eastern	Southeast	5th	82	30	40	—	12	72	191	222	—	—	—	—	—	Did not qualify
2011–12	2011–12	Eastern	Southeast↑	1st	82	38	26	—	18	94	197	216	7	3	4	17	18	Lost in conference quarterfinals, 3–4 (Devils)
2012–13^{4}	2012–13	Eastern	Southeast	5th	48	15	27	—	6	36	109	170	—	—	—	—	—	Did not qualify
2013–14	2013–14	Eastern	Atlantic	7th	82	29	45	—	8	66	188	262	—	—	—	—	—	Did not qualify
2014–15	2014–15	Eastern	Atlantic	6th	82	38	29	—	15	91	198	213	—	—	—	—	—	Did not qualify
2015–16	2015–16	Eastern	Atlantic↑	1st	82	47	26	—	9	103	232	200	6	2	4	14	15	Lost in first round, 2–4 (Islanders)
2016–17	2016–17	Eastern	Atlantic	6th	82	35	36	—	11	81	205	231	—	—	—	—	—	Did not qualify
2017–18	2017–18	Eastern	Atlantic	4th	82	44	30	—	8	96	245	243	—	—	—	—	—	Did not qualify
2018–19	2018–19	Eastern	Atlantic	5th	82	36	32	—	14	86	264	273	—	—	—	—	—	Did not qualify
2019–20^{5}	2019–20	Eastern	Atlantic	4th	69	35	26	—	8	78	228	224	4	1	3	7	13	Lost in qualifying round, 1–3 (Islanders)
2020–21^{6}	2020–21	—	Central	2nd	56	37	14	—	5	79	188	151	6	2	4	17	24	Lost in first round, 2–4 (Lightning)
2021–22	2021–22	Eastern	Atlantic↑	1st	82	58	18	—	6	122#	337	242	10	4	6	23	32	Won in first round, 4–2 (Capitals); Lost in second round, 0–4 (Lightning)
2022–23	2022–23	Eastern‡	Atlantic	4th	82	42	32	—	8	92	288	272	21	13	8	62	69	Won in first round, 4–3 (Bruins); Won in second round, 4–1 (Maple Leafs); Won in conference finals, 4–0 (Hurricanes); Lost in Stanley Cup Final, 1–4 (Golden Knights)
2023–24	2023–24	Eastern‡	Atlantic↑	1st	82	52	24	—	6	110	265	198	24	16	8	73	62	Won in first round, 4–1 (Lightning); Won in second round, 4–2 (Bruins); Won in conference finals, 4–2 (Rangers); Won in Stanley Cup Final, 4–3 (Oilers)†
2024–25	2024–25	Eastern‡	Atlantic	3rd	82	47	31	—	4	98	246	223	23	16	7	94	56	Won in first round, 4–1 (Lightning); Won in second round, 4–3 (Maple Leafs); Won in conference finals, 4–1 (Hurricanes); Won in Stanley Cup Final, 4–2 (Oilers)†
2025-26	2025–26	Eastern	Atlantic	7th	82	40	38	—	4	84	246	274	—	—	—	—	—	Did not qualify
Totals					2,519	1,128	1,013	142	236	2,634	6,981	7,236	132	70	62	384	371	11 playoff appearances

^{1} Season was shortened due to the 1994–95 NHL lockout.
^{2} Season was cancelled due to the 2004–05 NHL lockout.
^{3} As of the 2005–06 NHL season, all games tied after regulation will be decided in a shootout; SOL (Shootout losses) will be recorded as OTL in the standings.
^{4} The 2012–13 NHL season was shortened due to the 2012–13 NHL lockout.
^{5} The 2019–20 NHL season was suspended on March 12, 2020 due to the COVID-19 pandemic.
^{6} The 2020–21 NHL season was shortened due to the COVID-19 pandemic.

=== All-time records ===
Statistic	GP	W	L	T	OT
Regular season record (1993–present)	2,519	1,128	1,013	142	236
Postseason record (1993–present)	132	70	62	—	—
All-time regular and postseason record	2,651	1,198	1,075	142	236
All-time series record: 15–9
