= 2020–21 Chicago Blackhawks season =

Season of play of professional ice hockey team

2020–21 Chicago Blackhawks
- Division: 6th Central
- 2020–21 record: 24–25–7
- Home record: 13–11–4
- Road record: 11–14–3
- Goals for: 161
- Goals against: 186

Team information
- General manager: Stan Bowman
- Coach: Jeremy Colliton
- Captain: Jonathan Toews
- Alternate captains: Patrick Kane; Duncan Keith; Brent Seabrook (Jan.–Mar.)
- Arena: United Center
- Minor league affiliates: Rockford IceHogs (AHL); Indy Fuel (ECHL)

Team leaders
- Goals: Alex DeBrincat (32)
- Assists: Patrick Kane (51)
- Points: Patrick Kane (66)
- Penalty minutes: Nikita Zadorov (36)
- Plus/minus: Alex DeBrincat; Riley Stillman (+3)
- Wins: Kevin Lankinen (17)
- Goals against average: Kevin Lankinen (3.01)

The 2020–21 Chicago Blackhawks season was the 95th season for the National Hockey League (NHL) franchise, established on September 25, 1926. Jeremy Colliton led the Blackhawks in his second full year as head coach.

On December 20, 2020, the league announced a shortened 56-game season and realignment into four divisions with no conferences for the season due to the COVID-19 pandemic and the ongoing closure of the Canada–United States border. As a result of this realignment, the Blackhawks remained in the Central Division and only played games against the teams in their realigned division during the regular season.

On May 3, the Blackhawks were eliminated from playoff contention after a 5–2 loss to the Carolina Hurricanes.

Blackhawk captain Jonathan Toews missed the entire season due to an undisclosed injury, later revealed to be chronic immune response syndrome.

The season also marked the last season with the Blackhawks for defenseman Duncan Keith who was traded after the season.

== Standings ==
Central Division
Pos	Team	GP	W	L	OTL	RW	GF	GA	GD	Pts
1	y – Carolina Hurricanes	56	36	12	8	27	179	136	+43	80
2	x – Florida Panthers	56	37	14	5	26	189	153	+36	79
3	x – Tampa Bay Lightning	56	36	17	3	29	181	147	+34	75
4	x – Nashville Predators	56	31	23	2	21	156	154	+2	64
5	Dallas Stars	56	23	19	14	17	158	154	+4	60
6	Chicago Blackhawks	56	24	25	7	15	161	186	−25	55
7	Detroit Red Wings	56	19	27	10	17	127	171	−44	48
8	Columbus Blue Jackets	56	18	26	12	12	137	187	−50	48

Source: National Hockey League
Rules for classification: 1) Fewer number of games played (GP, only during regular season); 2) Greater number of regulation wins (RW); 3) Greater number of wins in regulation and overtime, excluding shootout wins (ROW); 4) Greater number of total wins, including shootouts (W); 5) Greater number of points earned in head-to-head play; if teams played an uneven number of head-to-head games, the result of the first game on the home ice of the team with the extra home game is discarded; 6) Greater goal differential (GD); 7) Greater number of goals scored (GF)
x – Clinched playoff spot; y – Clinched division

== Schedule and results ==
=== Regular season ===
The regular season schedule was published on December 23, 2020.

2020–21 game log

January: 3–4–3 (Home: 3–1–0; Road: 0–3–3)
#	Date	Opponent	Score	OT	Decision	Attendance	Record	Pts	Recap
1	January 13	@ Tampa Bay	1–5		Subban	0	0–1–0	0
2	January 15	@ Tampa Bay	2–5		Delia	0	0–2–0	0
3	January 17	@ Florida	2–5		Delia	4,147	0–3–0	0
4	January 19	@ Florida	4–5	OT	Lankinen	3,667	0–3–1	1
5	January 22	Detroit	4–1		Lankinen	0	1–3–1	3
6	January 24	Detroit	6–2		Lankinen	0	2–3–1	5
7	January 26	@ Nashville	2–3	OT	Subban	— (Note: Spectators were in attendance, but the exact number was not reported.)	2–3–2	6
8	January 27	@ Nashville	1–2	SO	Lankinen	—	2–3–3	7
9	January 29	Columbus	1–2		Lankinen	0	2–4–3	7
10	January 31	Columbus	3–1		Lankinen	0	3–4–3	9

February: 9–3–1 (Home: 3–2–1; Road: 6–1–0)
#	Date	Opponent	Score	OT	Decision	Attendance	Record	Pts	Recap
11	February 2	Carolina	3–4	SO	Lankinen	0	3–4–4	10
12	February 4	Carolina	6–4		Lankinen	0	4–4–4	12
13	February 7	@ Dallas	2–1	OT	Subban	4,203	5–4–4	14
14	February 9	@ Dallas	2–1	OT	Lankinen	4,059	6–4–4	16
15	February 11	Columbus	5–6		Lankinen	0	6–5–4	16
16	February 13	Columbus	3–2	OT	Lankinen	0	7–5–4	18
17	February 15	@ Detroit	3–2	OT	Subban	0	8–5–4	20
18	February 17	@ Detroit	2–0		Lankinen	0	9–5–4	22
19	February 19	@ Carolina	3–5		Lankinen	0	9–6–4	22
20	February 23	@ Columbus	6–5	SO	Lankinen	0	10–6–4	24
21	February 25	@ Columbus	2–0		Subban	0	11–6–4	26
22	February 27	Detroit	3–5		Subban	0	11–7–4	26
23	February 28	Detroit	7–2		Lankinen	0	12–7–4	28

March: 5–8–1 (Home: 4–3–1; Road: 1–5–0)
#	Date	Opponent	Score	OT	Decision	Attendance	Record	Pts	Recap
24	March 4	Tampa Bay	2–3	OT	Lankinen	0	12–7–5	29
25	March 5	Tampa Bay	4–3	SO	Subban	0	13–7–5	31
26	March 7	Tampa Bay	3–6		Lankinen	0	13–8–5	31
27	March 9	@ Dallas	1–6		Subban	4,211	13–9–5	31
28	March 11	@ Dallas	4–2		Lankinen	4,213	14–9–5	33
29	March 13	@ Florida	2–4		Lankinen	4,721	14–10–5	33
30	March 15	@ Florida	3–6		Lankinen	4,512	14–11–5	33
31	March 18	@ Tampa Bay	2–4		Lankinen	3,800	14–12–5	33
32	March 20	@ Tampa Bay	1–4		Subban	3,800	14–13–5	33
33	March 23	Florida	3–2		Lankinen	0	15–13–5	35
34	March 25	Florida	3–0		Lankinen	0	16–13–5	37
35	March 27	Nashville	1–3		Lankinen	0	16–14–5	37
36	March 28	Nashville	2–3		Subban	0	16–15–5	37
37	March 30	Carolina	2–1		Lankinen	0	17–15–5	39

April: 5–7–1 (Home: 2–4–1; Road: 3–3–0)
#	Date	Opponent	Score	OT	Decision	Attendance	Record	Pts	Recap
38	April 1	Carolina	3–4		Lankinen	0	17–16–5	39
39	April 3	@ Nashville	0–3		Lankinen	—	17–17–5	39
40	April 6	Dallas	4–2		Lankinen	0	18–17–5	41
41	April 8	Dallas	1–5		Lankinen	0	18–18–5	41
42	April 10	@ Columbus	4–3		Lankinen	4,502	19–18–5	43
43	April 12	@ Columbus	4–3	OT	Lankinen	4,093	20–18–5	45
44	April 15	@ Detroit	1–4		Lankinen	0	20–19–5	45
45	April 17	@ Detroit	4–0		Subban	0	21–19–5	47
46	April 19	@ Nashville	2–5		Lankinen	—	21–20–5	47
47	April 21	Nashville	5–4	OT	Subban	0	22–20–5	49
48	April 23	Nashville	1–3		Subban	0	22–21–5	49
49	April 27	Tampa Bay	4–7		Subban	0	22–22–5	49
50	April 29	Florida	3–4	OT	Lankinen	0	22–22–6	50

May: 2–3–1 (Home: 1–1–1; Road: 1–2–0)
#	Date	Opponent	Score	OT	Decision	Attendance	Record	Pts	Recap
51	May 1	Florida	4–5		Lankinen	0	22–23–6	50
52	May 3	@ Carolina	2–5		Subban	4,987	22–24–6	50
53	May 4	@ Carolina	3–6		Delia	4,987	22–25–6	50
54	May 6	@ Carolina	2–1	OT	Delia	4,987	23–25–6	52
55	May 9	Dallas	4–2		Lankinen	3,820	24–25–6	54
56	May 10	Dallas	4–5	OT	Delia	3,917	24–25–7	55

Legend: Win (2 points) Loss (0 points) Overtime/shootout loss (1 point)

=== Detailed records ===
Central Division
Opponent	Home	Away	Total	Pts	GF	GA
Carolina Hurricanes	2–1–1	1–3–0	3–4–1	7	24	30
Columbus Blue Jackets	2–2–0	4–0–0	6–2–0	12	28	22
Dallas Stars	2–1–1	3–1–0	5–2–1	11	22	24
Detroit Red Wings	3–1–0	3–1–0	6–2–0	12	30	16
Florida Panthers	2–1–1	0–3–1	2–4–2	6	24	31
Nashville Predators	1–3–0	0–2–2	1–5–2	4	14	26
Tampa Bay Lightning	1–2–1	0–4–0	1–6–1	3	19	37
Total	13–11–4	11–14–3	24–25–7	55	161	186

== Player statistics ==
=== Skaters ===
Regular season
Player	GP	G	A	Pts	+/−	PIM
Patrick Kane	56	15	51	66	−7	14
Alex DeBrincat	52	32	24	56	3	12
Dominik Kubalik	56	17	21	38	−3	18
Pius Suter	55	14	13	27	−5	14
Brandon Hagel	52	9	15	24	−7	11
Mattias Janmark^{‡}	41	10	9	19	−17	8
Dylan Strome	40	9	8	17	−16	14
Philipp Kurashev	54	8	8	16	−9	12
Adam Boqvist	35	2	14	16	−7	14
Carl Soderberg^{‡}	34	7	8	15	−5	14
Duncan Keith	54	4	11	15	−13	30
Connor Murphy	50	3	12	15	1	35
Vinnie Hinostroza^{†}	17	4	8	12	2	8
David Kampf	56	1	11	12	−3	20
Kirby Dach	18	2	8	10	−3	4
Calvin de Haan	44	1	9	10	−16	14
Wyatt Kalynuk	21	4	5	9	−6	4
Nikita Zadorov	55	1	7	8	1	36
Ian Mitchell	39	3	4	7	−10	14
Nicolas Beaudin	19	2	4	6	1	2
Ryan Carpenter	40	4	1	5	−10	19
Andrew Shaw	14	2	2	4	−5	6
Adam Gaudette^{†}	7	1	3	4	−2	0
Mike Hardman	8	1	2	3	0	0
Lucas Wallmark^{‡}	16	0	3	3	−2	6
MacKenzie Entwistle	5	1	1	2	1	2
Brett Connolly^{†}	10	1	1	2	−1	2
Matthew Highmore^{‡}	24	0	2	2	−5	6
Riley Stillman^{†}	13	1	0	1	3	2
Madison Bowey^{‡}	2	0	1	1	1	0
Lucas Carlsson^{‡}	12	0	1	1	1	2
Reese Johnson	5	0	0	0	−2	9
Alec Regula	3	0	0	0	−1	0
Brandon Pirri	1	0	0	0	−2	0

=== Goaltenders ===
Regular season
Player	GP	GS	TOI	W	L	OT	GA	GAA	SA	SV%	SO	G	A	PIM
Kevin Lankinen	37	37	2,174:49	17	14	5	109	3.01	1,204	.909	2	0	2	2
Malcolm Subban	16	14	881:17	6	8	1	47	3.20	471	.900	2	0	0	0
Collin Delia	6	5	334:29	1	3	1	20	3.59	205	.902	0	0	0	0

^{†}Denotes player spent time with another team before joining the Blackhawks. Stats reflect time with the Blackhawks only.
^{‡}Denotes player was traded mid-season. Stats reflect time with the Blackhawks only.
Bold/italics denotes franchise record.

== Transactions ==
The Blackhawks have been involved in the following transactions during the 2020–21 season.

=== Trades ===
Date	Details		Ref
October 10, 2020	To Colorado Avalanche Brandon Saad; Dennis Gilbert	To Chicago Blackhawks Nikita Zadorov; Anton Lindholm	
April 2, 2021	To Chicago Blackhawks Vinnie Hinostroza	To Florida Panthers Brad Morrison	
April 8, 2021	To Chicago Blackhawks Brett Connolly; Riley Stillman; Henrik Borgstrom; 7th-round pick in 2021	To Florida Panthers Lucas Wallmark; Lucas Carlsson	
April 12, 2021	To Chicago Blackhawks Adam Gaudette	To Vancouver Canucks Matthew Highmore	
April 12, 2021	To Colorado Avalanche Carl Soderberg	To Chicago Blackhawks Josh Dickinson; Ryder Rolston	
April 12, 2021	To San Jose Sharks Mattias Janmark	To Chicago Blackhawks Nick DeSimone	
April 12, 2021	To Vegas Golden Knights Nick DeSimone; 5th-round pick in 2022	To Chicago Blackhawks 2nd-round pick in 2021; 3rd-round pick in 2022	
April 12, 2021	To Vancouver Canucks Madison Bowey; 5th-round pick in 2021	To Chicago Blackhawks 4th-round pick in 2021	

== Draft picks ==
Below are the Chicago Blackhawks's selections at the 2020 NHL entry draft, which was originally scheduled for June 26–27, 2020 at the Bell Center in Montreal, Quebec.

Round	#	Player	Pos	Nationality	College/Junior/Club team (League)
1	17	Lukas Reichel	LW	Germany	Eisbären Berlin (DEL)
2	46	Drew Commesso	G	United States United States	U.S. NTDP (USHL)
3	79	Landon Slaggert	LW	United States	U.S. NTDP (USHL)
4	110	Michael Krutil	D	Czech Republic	Sparta Jr. (U20 Extraliga)
5	141	Isaak Phillips	D	Canada	Sudbury Wolves (OHL)
6	172	Chad Yetman	C	Canada	Erie Otters (OHL)
