= 2020–21 Nashville Predators season =

Season of play of professional ice hockey team

2020–21 Nashville Predators
- Division: 4th Central
- 2020–21 record: 31–23–2
- Home record: 18–10–0
- Road record: 13–13–2
- Goals for: 156
- Goals against: 154

Team information
- General manager: David Poile
- Coach: John Hynes
- Captain: Roman Josi
- Alternate captains: Mattias Ekholm; Ryan Ellis; Filip Forsberg; Ryan Johansen
- Arena: Bridgestone Arena
- Minor league affiliates: Milwaukee Admirals (AHL); Chicago Wolves (AHL); Florida Everblades (ECHL)

Team leaders
- Goals: Mikael Granlund; Calle Jarnkrok (13)
- Assists: Roman Josi (25)
- Points: Roman Josi (33)
- Penalty minutes: Mathieu Olivier (70)
- Plus/minus: Mattias Ekholm (+19)
- Wins: Juuse Saros (21)
- Goals against average: Juuse Saros (2.28)

The 2020–21 Nashville Predators season was the 23rd season for the National Hockey League (NHL) franchise that was established on June 25, 1997. John Hynes entered his second season as coach and first full season as head coach of the team. On December 20, 2020, the league temporarily realigned into four divisions with no conferences due to the COVID-19 pandemic and the ongoing closure of the Canada–United States border. As a result of this realignment, the Predators remained in the Central Division this season and would only play games against the other teams in their realigned division during the regular season and potentially the first two rounds of the playoffs.

On May 8, 2021, the Predators clinched a playoff berth after a 3–1 win over the Carolina Hurricanes. They were eliminated from the playoffs in the first round with a 4–3 overtime loss to the Carolina Hurricanes in game six.

== Standings ==
Central Division
Pos	Team	GP	W	L	OTL	RW	GF	GA	GD	Pts
1	y – Carolina Hurricanes	56	36	12	8	27	179	136	+43	80
2	x – Florida Panthers	56	37	14	5	26	189	153	+36	79
3	x – Tampa Bay Lightning	56	36	17	3	29	181	147	+34	75
4	x – Nashville Predators	56	31	23	2	21	156	154	+2	64
5	Dallas Stars	56	23	19	14	17	158	154	+4	60
6	Chicago Blackhawks	56	24	25	7	15	161	186	−25	55
7	Detroit Red Wings	56	19	27	10	17	127	171	−44	48
8	Columbus Blue Jackets	56	18	26	12	12	137	187	−50	48

Source: National Hockey League
Rules for classification: 1) Fewer number of games played (GP, only during regular season); 2) Greater number of regulation wins (RW); 3) Greater number of wins in regulation and overtime, excluding shootout wins (ROW); 4) Greater number of total wins, including shootouts (W); 5) Greater number of points earned in head-to-head play; if teams played an uneven number of head-to-head games, the result of the first game on the home ice of the team with the extra home game is discarded; 6) Greater goal differential (GD); 7) Greater number of goals scored (GF)
x – Clinched playoff spot; y – Clinched division

== Schedule and results ==
=== Regular season ===
The regular season schedule was published on December 23, 2020.

2020–21 game log

January: 4–4–0 (home: 4–1–0; road: 0–3–0)
#	Date	Visitor	Score	Home	OT	Decision	Attendance	Record	Pts	Recap
1	January 14	Columbus	1–3	Nashville		Saros	0	1–0–0	2
2	January 16	Columbus	2–5	Nashville		Saros	0	2–0–0	4
3	January 18	Carolina	4–2	Nashville		Rinne	0	2–1–0	4
—	January 19	Carolina	–	Nashville	Postponed due to COVID-19. Rescheduled for March 2.
4	January 22	Nashville	0–7	Dallas		Saros	4,214	2–2–0	4
5	January 24	Nashville	2–3	Dallas		Saros	4,056	2–3–0	4
6	January 26	Chicago	2–3	Nashville	OT	Rinne	— (Note: Spectators were in attendance, but the exact number was not reported.)	3–3–0	6
7	January 27	Chicago	1–2	Nashville	SO	Saros	—	4–3–0	8
8	January 30	Nashville	3–4	Tampa Bay		Rinne	0	4–4–0	8

February: 6–7–0 (home: 3–3–0; road: 3–4–0)
#	Date	Visitor	Score	Home	OT	Decision	Attendance	Record	Pts	Recap
9	February 1	Nashville	2–5	Tampa Bay		Saros	0	4–5–0	8
10	February 4	Nashville	6–5	Florida	OT	Rinne	3,698	5–5–0	10
11	February 5	Nashville	1–2	Florida		Rinne	3,977	5–6–0	10
12	February 8	Tampa Bay	4–1	Nashville		Rinne	—	5–7–0	10
13	February 9	Tampa Bay	6–1	Nashville		Saros	—	5–8–0	10
14	February 11	Detroit	2–3	Nashville		Rinne	—	6–8–0	12
15	February 13	Detroit	4–2	Nashville		Rinne	—	6–9–0	12
—	February 15	Nashville	–	Dallas	Postponed due to winter storm. Rescheduled for March 7.
—	February 16	Nashville	–	Dallas	Postponed due to winter storm. Rescheduled for March 21.
16	February 18	Nashville	0–3	Columbus		Saros	0	6–10–0	12
17	February 20	Nashville	4–2	Columbus		Rinne	0	7–10–0	14
18	February 23	Nashville	2–0	Detroit		Rinne	0	8–10–0	16
19	February 25	Nashville	2–5	Detroit		Rinne	0	8–11–0	16
20	February 27	Columbus	1–2	Nashville		Saros	—	9–11–0	18
21	February 28	Columbus	1–3	Nashville		Saros	—	10–11–0	20

March: 9–6–1 (home: 3–3–0; road: 6–3–1)
#	Date	Visitor	Score	Home	OT	Decision	Attendance	Record	Pts	Recap
22	March 2	Carolina	4–2	Nashville		Rinne	—	10–12–0	20
23	March 4	Florida	5–4	Nashville		Rinne	—	10–13–0	20
24	March 6	Florida	6–2	Nashville		Rinne	—	10–14–0	20
25	March 7	Nashville	4–3	Dallas	SO	Rinne	3,976	11–14–0	22
26	March 9	Nashville	2–3	Carolina	OT	Rinne	2,924	11–14–1	23
27	March 11	Nashville	1–5	Carolina		Rinne	2,924	11–15–1	23
28	March 13	Nashville	3–6	Tampa Bay		Rinne	3,800	11–16–1	23
29	March 15	Nashville	4–1	Tampa Bay		Rinne	3,800	12–16–1	25
30	March 18	Nashville	2–1	Florida		Saros	4,559	13–16–1	27
31	March 20	Nashville	0–2	Florida		Saros	4,358	13–17–1	27
32	March 21	Nashville	4–3	Dallas	SO	Rinne	4,011	14–17–1	29
33	March 23	Detroit	0–2	Nashville		Saros	—	15–17–1	31
34	March 25	Detroit	1–7	Nashville		Saros	—	16–17–1	33
35	March 27	Nashville	3–1	Chicago		Saros	0	17–17–1	35
36	March 28	Nashville	3–2	Chicago		Rinne	0	18–17–1	37
37	March 30	Dallas	2–3	Nashville	OT	Saros	—	19–17–1	39

April: 8–5–1 (home: 5–3–0; road: 3–2–1)
#	Date	Visitor	Score	Home	OT	Decision	Attendance	Record	Pts	Recap
38	April 1	Dallas	4–1	Nashville		Saros	—	19–18–1	39
39	April 3	Chicago	0–3	Nashville		Saros	—	20–18–1	41
40	April 6	Nashville	3–2	Detroit	SO	Saros	0	21–18–1	43
41	April 8	Nashville	7–1	Detroit		Saros	0	22–18–1	45
42	April 10	Tampa Bay	3–0	Nashville		Rinne	—	22–19–1	45
43	April 11	Dallas	2–3	Nashville	SO	Saros	—	23–19–1	47
44	April 13	Tampa Bay	2–7	Nashville		Saros	—	24–19–1	49
45	April 15	Nashville	1–4	Carolina		Saros	4,987	24–20–1	49
46	April 17	Nashville	1–3	Carolina		Saros	4,987	24–21–1	49
47	April 19	Chicago	2–5	Nashville		Saros	—	25–21–1	51
48	April 21	Nashville	4–5	Chicago	OT	Saros	0	25–21–2	52
49	April 23	Nashville	3–1	Chicago		Saros	0	26–21–2	54
50	April 26	Florida	1–4	Nashville		Saros	—	27–21–2	56
51	April 27	Florida	7–4	Nashville		Saros	—	27–22–2	56

May: 4–1–0 (home: 3–0–0; road: 1–1–0)
#	Date	Visitor	Score	Home	OT	Decision	Attendance	Record	Pts	Recap
52	May 1	Dallas	0–1	Nashville	OT	Saros	—	28–22–2	58
53	May 3	Nashville	4–3	Columbus	OT	Saros	4,210	29–22–2	60
54	May 5	Nashville	2–4	Columbus		Saros	4,084	29–23–2	60
55	May 8	Carolina	1–3	Nashville		Saros	—	30–23–2	62
56	May 10	Carolina	0–5	Nashville		Rinne	—	31–23–2	64

Legend: Win (2 points) Loss (0 points) Overtime/shootout loss (1 point) Postponement

=== Playoffs ===
2021 Stanley Cup playoffs

Central Division First Round vs. (C1) Carolina Hurricanes: Carolina won 4–2
#	Date	Visitor	Score	Home	OT	Decision	Attendance	Series	Recap
1	May 17	Nashville	2–5	Carolina		Saros	12,000	0–1
2	May 19	Nashville	0–3	Carolina		Saros	12,000	0–2
3	May 21	Carolina	4–5	Nashville	2OT	Saros	12,135	1–2
4	May 23	Carolina	3–4	Nashville	2OT	Saros	12,135	2–2
5	May 25	Nashville	2–3	Carolina	OT	Saros	12,000	2–3
6	May 27	Carolina	4–3	Nashville	OT	Saros	14,107	2–4

Legend: Win Loss

== Draft picks ==
Below are the Nashville Predators selections at the 2020 NHL Draft which was held on October 6–7 at the NHL Studios.

Round	#	Player	Pos	Nationally	College/Junior/Club team (league)
1	11	Yaroslav Askarov	(G)	Russia	SKA-Neva (VHL)
2	42	Luke Evangelista	(RW)	Canada	London Knights (OHL)
3	73	Luke Prokop	(D)	Canada	Calgary Hitmen (WHL)
4	101	Adam Wilsby	(D)	Sweden	Skelleftea AIK (SHL)
6	166	Luke Reid	(D)	Canada	Chicago Steel (USHL)
7	202	Gunnarwolfe Fontaine	(LW)	United States	Northeastern Huskies (H-East)
7	209	Chase McLane	(C)	United States	Penn State Nittany Lions (Big Ten)
