= 2020–21 Detroit Red Wings season =

Season of Ice hockey team

2020–21 Detroit Red Wings
- Division: 7th Central
- 2020–21 record: 19–27–10
- Home record: 12–11–5
- Road record: 7–16–5
- Goals for: 127
- Goals against: 171

Team information
- General manager: Steve Yzerman
- Coach: Jeff Blashill
- Captain: Dylan Larkin
- Alternate captains: Luke Glendening; Frans Nielsen
- Arena: Little Caesars Arena
- Minor league affiliates: Grand Rapids Griffins (AHL); Toledo Walleye (ECHL)

Team leaders
- Goals: Adam Erne (11)
- Assists: Filip Hronek (24)
- Points: Filip Hronek (26)
- Penalty minutes: Dylan Larkin (34)
- Plus/minus: Danny DeKeyser; Robby Fabbri; Luke Glendening (+3)
- Wins: Jonathan Bernier (9)
- Goals against average: Thomas Greiss (2.70)

The 2020–21 Detroit Red Wings season was the 95th season for the National Hockey League (NHL) franchise that was established on September 25, 1926. It was the Red Wings' fourth season at Little Caesars Arena.

On December 20, 2020, the league temporarily realigned into four divisions with no conferences due to the COVID-19 pandemic and the ongoing closure of the Canada–United States border. As a result of this realignment the Red Wings returned to the Central Division for the first time since 2012–13 and only played games against the other teams in their new division during the regular season.

On April 26, the Red Wings were eliminated from playoff contention for the fifth consecutive season for the first time since the 1978–79 season and the 1982–83 season, after the Nashville Predators defeated the Florida Panthers.

== Standings ==
=== Divisional standings ===
Central Division
Pos	Team	GP	W	L	OTL	RW	GF	GA	GD	Pts
1	y – Carolina Hurricanes	56	36	12	8	27	179	136	+43	80
2	x – Florida Panthers	56	37	14	5	26	189	153	+36	79
3	x – Tampa Bay Lightning	56	36	17	3	29	181	147	+34	75
4	x – Nashville Predators	56	31	23	2	21	156	154	+2	64
5	Dallas Stars	56	23	19	14	17	158	154	+4	60
6	Chicago Blackhawks	56	24	25	7	15	161	186	−25	55
7	Detroit Red Wings	56	19	27	10	17	127	171	−44	48
8	Columbus Blue Jackets	56	18	26	12	12	137	187	−50	48

Source: National Hockey League
Rules for classification: 1) Fewer number of games played (GP, only during regular season); 2) Greater number of regulation wins (RW); 3) Greater number of wins in regulation and overtime, excluding shootout wins (ROW); 4) Greater number of total wins, including shootouts (W); 5) Greater number of points earned in head-to-head play; if teams played an uneven number of head-to-head games, the result of the first game on the home ice of the team with the extra home game is discarded; 6) Greater goal differential (GD); 7) Greater number of goals scored (GF)
x – Clinched playoff spot; y – Clinched division

== Schedule and results ==
=== Regular season ===
2020–21 game log 19–27–10 (Home: 12–11–5; Road: 7–16–5)

January: 2–6–2 (Home: 2–3–1; Road: 0–3–1)
#	Date	Visitor	Score	Home	OT	Decision	Attendance	Record	Pts	Recap
1	January 14	Carolina	3–0	Detroit		Greiss	0	0–1–0	0
2	January 16	Carolina	2–4	Detroit		Bernier	0	1–1–0	2
3	January 18	Columbus	3–2	Detroit		Greiss	0	1–2–0	2
4	January 19	Columbus	2–3	Detroit	OT	Bernier	0	2–2–0	4
5	January 22	Detroit	1–4	Chicago		Greiss	0	2–3–0	4
6	January 24	Detroit	2–6	Chicago		Bernier	0	2–4–0	4
7	January 26	Detroit	1–2	Dallas	OT	Greiss	4,109	2–4–1	5
8	January 28	Detroit	3–7	Dallas		Greiss	4,214	2–5–1	5
9	January 30	Florida	3–2	Detroit	OT	Greiss	0	2–5–2	6
10	January 31	Florida	3–2	Detroit		Greiss	0	2–6–2	6

February: 5–8–1 (Home: 2–3–1; Road: 3–5–0)
#	Date	Visitor	Score	Home	OT	Decision	Attendance	Record	Pts	Recap
11	February 3	Detroit	1–5	Tampa Bay		Greiss	0	2–7–2	6
12	February 5	Detroit	1–3	Tampa Bay		Greiss	0	2–8–2	6
13	February 7	Detroit	4–1	Florida		Greiss	3,706	3–8–2	8
14	February 9	Detroit	1–2	Florida		Greiss	3,477	3–9–2	8
15	February 11	Detroit	2–3	Nashville		Greiss	0	3–10–2	8
16	February 13	Detroit	4–2	Nashville		Bernier	0	4–10–2	10
17	February 15	Chicago	3–2	Detroit	OT	Greiss	0	4–10–3	11
18	February 17	Chicago	2–0	Detroit		Bernier	0	4–11–3	11
19	February 19	Florida	7–2	Detroit		Greiss	0	4–12–3	11
20	February 20	Florida	1–2	Detroit		Bernier	0	5–12–3	13
21	February 23	Nashville	2–0	Detroit		Bernier	0	5–13–3	13
22	February 25	Nashville	2–5	Detroit		Bernier	0	6–13–3	15
23	February 27	Detroit	5–3	Chicago		Bernier	0	7–13–3	17
24	February 28	Detroit	2–7	Chicago		Greiss	0	7–14–3	17

March: 5–7–1 (Home: 5–2–1; Road: 0–5–0)
#	Date	Visitor	Score	Home	OT	Decision	Attendance	Record	Pts	Recap
25	March 2	Detroit	1–4	Columbus		Bernier	1,953	7–15–3	17
26	March 4	Detroit	2–5	Carolina		Bernier	2,924	7–16–3	17
27	March 9	Tampa Bay	4–3	Detroit	OT	Greiss	0	7–16–4	18
28	March 11	Tampa Bay	4–6	Detroit		Bernier	0	8–16–4	20
29	March 14	Carolina	2–1	Detroit		Bernier	0	8–17–4	20
30	March 16	Carolina	2–4	Detroit		Bernier	0	9–17–4	22
31	March 18	Dallas	2–3	Detroit		Greiss	0	10–17–4	24
32	March 20	Dallas	3–0	Detroit		Greiss	0	10–18–4	24
33	March 23	Detroit	0–2	Nashville		Greiss	— (Note: Spectators were in attendance, but the exact number was not reported.)	10–19–4	24
34	March 25	Detroit	1–7	Nashville		Pickard	—	10–20–4	24
35	March 27	Columbus	1–3	Detroit		Pickard	0	11–20–4	26
36	March 28	Columbus	1–4	Detroit		Pickard	0	12–20–4	28
37	March 30	Detroit	1–4	Florida		Pickard	4,321	12–21–4	28

April: 5–5–5 (Home: 2–2–2; Road: 3–3–3)
#	Date	Visitor	Score	Home	OT	Decision	Attendance	Record	Pts	Recap
38	April 1	Detroit	2–3	Florida	OT	Greiss	4,359	12–21–5	29
39	April 3	Detroit	1–2	Tampa Bay		Greiss	3,800	12–22–5	29
40	April 4	Detroit	5–1	Tampa Bay		Greiss	3,800	13–22–5	31
41	April 6	Nashville	3–2	Detroit	SO	Greiss	0	13–22–6	32
42	April 8	Nashville	7–1	Detroit		Bernier	0	13–23–6	32
43	April 10	Detroit	5–4	Carolina	SO	Greiss	4,987	14–23–6	34
44	April 12	Detroit	3–1	Carolina		Bernier	4,987	15–23–6	36
45	April 15	Chicago	1–4	Detroit		Greiss	0	16–23–6	38
46	April 17	Chicago	4–0	Detroit		Bernier	0	16–24–6	38
47	April 19	Detroit	2–3	Dallas	SO	Greiss	4,812	16–24–7	39
48	April 20	Detroit	2–5	Dallas		Bernier	5,148	16–25–7	39
49	April 22	Dallas	3–7	Detroit		Greiss	0	17–25–7	41
50	April 24	Dallas	2–1	Detroit	OT	Bernier	0	17–25–8	42
51	April 27	Detroit	0–1	Columbus	SO	Greiss	4,316	17–25–9	43
52	April 29	Detroit	1–3	Carolina		Bernier	4,987	17–26–9	43

May: 2–1–1 (Home: 1–1–0; Road: 1–0–1)
#	Date	Visitor	Score	Home	OT	Decision	Attendance	Record	Pts	Recap
53	May 1	Tampa Bay	0–1	Detroit	SO	Greiss	0	18–26–9	45
54	May 2	Tampa Bay	2–1	Detroit		Bernier	0	18–27–9	45
55	May 7	Detroit	5–2	Columbus		Greiss	4,402	19–27–9	47
56	May 8	Detroit	4–5	Columbus	OT	Pickard	4,493	19–27–10	48

Legend: Win (2 points) Loss (0 points) Overtime/shootout loss (1 point)

== Awards and honours ==
=== Awards ===
Regular season
Player	Award	Awarded
Thomas Greiss	NHL First Star of the Week	May 3, 2021

=== Milestones ===
Regular season
Player	Milestone	Reached
Tyler Bertuzzi	200th career NHL game	January 14, 2021
Frans Nielsen	900th career NHL game	January 22, 2021
Marc Staal	900th career NHL game	January 28, 2021
Darren Helm	700th career NHL game	January 30, 2021
Dylan Larkin	400th career NHL game	February 3, 2021
Troy Stecher	300th career NHL game	February 9, 2021
Sam Gagner	300th career NHL assist	March 11, 2021
Thomas Greiss	300th career NHL game	March 18, 2021
Anthony Mantha	300th career NHL game	April 8, 2021
Danny DeKeyser	100th career NHL assist	April 15, 2021

== Transactions ==
The Red Wings have been involved in the following transactions during the 2020–21 season.

=== Trades ===
Date	Details		Ref
December 11, 2020	To New York Islanders Dmytro Timashov	To Detroit Red Wings Future considerations	
April 9, 2021	To Colorado Avalanche Patrik Nemeth	To Detroit Red Wings 4th-round pick in 2022	
April 10, 2021	To Columbus Blue Jackets Brian Lashoff	To Detroit Red Wings David Savard	
April 10, 2021	To Tampa Bay Lightning David Savard	To Detroit Red Wings 4th-round pick in 2021	
April 11, 2021	To Montreal Canadiens Jon Merrill	To Detroit Red Wings Hayden Verbeek; 5th-round pick in 2021	
April 12, 2021	To Washington Capitals Anthony Mantha	To Detroit Red Wings Richard Panik; Jakub Vrana; 1st-round pick in 2021; 2nd-round pick in 2022	

=== Free agents ===
Date	Player	Team	Contract term	Ref
October 9, 2020	Bobby Ryan	from Ottawa Senators	1-year	
October 9, 2020	Jon Merrill	from Vegas Golden Knights	1-year	
October 9, 2020	Riley Barber	from Pittsburgh Penguins	2-year	
October 9, 2020	Kevin Boyle	from Anaheim Ducks	1-year	
October 9, 2020	Kyle Criscuolo	from Anaheim Ducks	1-year	
October 10, 2020	Thomas Greiss	from New York Islanders	2-year	
October 10, 2020	Troy Stecher	from Vancouver Canucks	2-year	
October 11, 2020	Vladislav Namestnikov	from Colorado Avalanche	2-year	

=== Contract terminations ===
Date	Player	Via	Ref
October 7, 2020	Justin Abdelkader	Unconditional waivers	

=== Retirement ===
Date	Player	Ref
October 26, 2020	Trevor Daley	

=== Signings ===
Date	Player	Contract term	Ref
October 28, 2020	Tyler Bertuzzi	1-year	
November 3, 2020	Anthony Mantha	4-year	

== Draft picks ==
Below are the Detroit Red Wings' selections at the 2020 NHL entry draft, which was held on October 6 and 7, 2020, via video conference call due to the COVID-19 pandemic

Round	#	Player	Pos	Nationality	College/Junior/Club team (League)
1	4	Lucas Raymond	LW	Sweden	Frölunda HC (SHL)
2	32	William Wallinder	D	Sweden	Modo J20 (J20 SuperElit)
2	51	Theodor Niederbach	C	Sweden	Frölunda J20 (J20 SuperElit)
2	55	Cross Hanas	LW	United States	Portland Winterhawks (WHL)
3	63	Donovan Sebrango	D	Canada	Kitchener Rangers (OHL)
3	70	Eemil Viro	D	Finland	TPS (Liiga)
4	97	Sam Stange	RW	United States	Sioux City Musketeers (USHL)
4	107^{1}	Jan Bednar	G	Czech Republic	HC Baník Sokolov (Czech 2.liga)
5	132	Alex Cotton	D	Canada	Lethbridge Hurricanes (WHL)
6	156	Kyle Aucoin	D	Canada	Tri-City Storm (USHL)
7	187	Kienan Draper	RW	United States	Chilliwack Chiefs (BCHL)
7	203	Chase Bradley	LW	United States	Sioux City Musketeers (USHL)

Notes:

1. The Edmonton Oilers' fourth-round pick went to the Detroit Red Wings as the result of a trade on February 23, 2020, that sent Mike Green to Edmonton in exchange for Kyle Brodziak and this pick (being conditional at the time of the trade).
