= 2020–21 Columbus Blue Jackets season =

National Hockey League season

2020–21 Columbus Blue Jackets
- Division: 8th Central
- 2020–21 record: 18–26–12
- Home record: 11–9–8
- Road record: 7–17–4
- Goals for: 137
- Goals against: 187

Team information
- General manager: Jarmo Kekäläinen
- Coach: John Tortorella
- Captain: Nick Foligno (Jan. 14 – Apr. 10); Vacant (Apr. 10 – May 8)
- Alternate captains: Cam Atkinson; Boone Jenner; Seth Jones
- Arena: Nationwide Arena
- Minor league affiliate: Cleveland Monsters (AHL)

Team leaders
- Goals: Oliver Bjorkstrand (18)
- Assists: Oliver Bjorkstrand (26)
- Points: Oliver Bjorkstrand (44)
- Penalty minutes: Max Domi (75)
- Plus/minus: Eric Robinson (+6)
- Wins: Joonas Korpisalo (9)
- Goals against average: Elvis Merzlikins (2.77)

The 2020–21 Columbus Blue Jackets season was the 21st season for the National Hockey League (NHL) franchise that was established on June 25, 1997. On December 20, 2020, the league temporarily realigned into four divisions with no conferences due to the COVID-19 pandemic and the ongoing closure of the Canada–United States border. As a result of this realignment, the Blue Jackets played the season in the Central Division and only played games against the other teams in their new division during the regular season.

On April 22, the Blue Jackets were eliminated from playoff contention for the first time since the 2015–16 season, after a 3–1 loss to the Tampa Bay Lightning.

== Standings ==
Central Division
Pos	Team	GP	W	L	OTL	RW	GF	GA	GD	Pts
1	y – Carolina Hurricanes	56	36	12	8	27	179	136	+43	80
2	x – Florida Panthers	56	37	14	5	26	189	153	+36	79
3	x – Tampa Bay Lightning	56	36	17	3	29	181	147	+34	75
4	x – Nashville Predators	56	31	23	2	21	156	154	+2	64
5	Dallas Stars	56	23	19	14	17	158	154	+4	60
6	Chicago Blackhawks	56	24	25	7	15	161	186	−25	55
7	Detroit Red Wings	56	19	27	10	17	127	171	−44	48
8	Columbus Blue Jackets	56	18	26	12	12	137	187	−50	48

Source: National Hockey League
Rules for classification: 1) Fewer number of games played (GP, only during regular season); 2) Greater number of regulation wins (RW); 3) Greater number of wins in regulation and overtime, excluding shootout wins (ROW); 4) Greater number of total wins, including shootouts (W); 5) Greater number of points earned in head-to-head play; if teams played an uneven number of head-to-head games, the result of the first game on the home ice of the team with the extra home game is discarded; 6) Greater goal differential (GD); 7) Greater number of goals scored (GF)
x – Clinched playoff spot; y – Clinched division

== Schedule and results ==
=== Regular season ===
The regular season schedule was published on December 23, 2020.

2020–21 game log

January: 4–3–3 (home: 2–0–2; road: 2–3–1)
#	Date	Visitor	Score	Home	OT	Decision	Attendance	Record	Pts	Recap
1	January 14	Columbus	1–3	Nashville		Korpisalo	0	0–1–0	0
2	January 16	Columbus	2–5	Nashville		Merzlikins	0	0–2–0	0
3	January 18	Columbus	3–2	Detroit		Korpisalo	0	1–2–0	2
4	January 19	Columbus	2–3	Detroit	OT	Merzlikins	0	1–2–1	3
5	January 21	Tampa Bay	3–2	Columbus	OT	Korpisalo	0	1–2–2	4
6	January 23	Tampa Bay	2–5	Columbus		Merzlikins	0	2–2–2	6
7	January 26	Florida	4–3	Columbus	SO	Korpisalo	0	2–2–3	7
8	January 28	Florida	2–3	Columbus	SO	Merzlikins	0	3–2–3	9
9	January 29	Columbus	2–1	Chicago		Korpisalo	0	4–2–3	11
10	January 31	Columbus	1–3	Chicago		Merzlikins	0	4–3–3	11

February: 4–7–2 (home: 2–4–1; road: 2–3–1)
#	Date	Visitor	Score	Home	OT	Decision	Attendance	Record	Pts	Recap
11	February 2	Dallas	6–3	Columbus		Korpisalo	0	4–4–3	11
12	February 4	Dallas	3–4	Columbus		Korpisalo	0	5–4–3	13
13	February 7	Carolina	6–5	Columbus		Korpisalo	0	5–5–3	13
14	February 8	Carolina	2–3	Columbus		Korpisalo	0	6–5–3	15
15	February 11	Columbus	6–5	Chicago		Korpisalo	0	7–5–3	17
16	February 13	Columbus	2–3	Chicago	OT	Korpisalo	0	7–5–4	18
17	February 15	Columbus	3–7	Carolina		Korpisalo	0	7–6–4	18
18	February 18	Nashville	0–3	Columbus		Merzlikins	0	8–6–4	20
19	February 20	Nashville	4–2	Columbus		Merzlikins	0	8–7–4	20
20	February 23	Chicago	6–5	Columbus	SO	Korpisalo	0	8–7–5	21
21	February 25	Chicago	2–0	Columbus		Korpisalo	0	8–8–5	21
22	February 27	Columbus	1–2	Nashville		Korpisalo	— (Note: Spectators were in attendance, but the exact number was not reported.)	8–9–5	21
23	February 28	Columbus	1–3	Nashville		Korpisalo	—	8–10–5	21

March: 6–5–3 (home: 2–2–3; road: 4–3–0)
#	Date	Visitor	Score	Home	OT	Decision	Attendance	Record	Pts	Recap
24	March 2	Detroit	1–4	Columbus		Korpisalo	1,953	9–10–5	23
25	March 4	Columbus	3–2	Dallas		Korpisalo	4,112	10–10–5	25
26	March 6	Columbus	0–5	Dallas		Korpisalo	4,203	10–11–5	25
27	March 9	Florida	4–2	Columbus		Korpisalo	3,448	10–12–5	25
28	March 11	Florida	5–4	Columbus	OT	Merzlikins	3,739	10–12–6	26
29	March 13	Dallas	3–4	Columbus	OT	Merzlikins	4,160	11–12–6	28
30	March 14	Dallas	2–1	Columbus	SO	Korpisalo	3,992	11–12–7	29
31	March 18	Columbus	3–2	Carolina	OT	Korpisalo	2,924	12–12–7	31
32	March 20	Columbus	3–2	Carolina	SO	Merzlikins	2,924	13–12–7	33
33	March 22	Carolina	3–0	Columbus		Korpisalo	3,829	13–13–7	33
34	March 25	Carolina	4–3	Columbus	OT	Korpisalo	4,033	13–13–8	34
35	March 27	Columbus	1–3	Detroit		Merzlikins	0	13–14–8	34
36	March 28	Columbus	1–4	Detroit		Merzlikins	0	13–15–8	34
37	March 30	Columbus	3–1	Tampa Bay		Merzlikins	3,800	14–15–8	36

April: 2–10–2 (home: 2–2–1; road: 0–8–1)
#	Date	Visitor	Score	Home	OT	Decision	Attendance	Record	Pts	Recap
38	April 1	Columbus	2–3	Tampa Bay		Merzlikins	3,800	14–16–8	36
39	April 3	Columbus	2–5	Florida		Merzlikins	4,375	14–17–8	36
40	April 4	Columbus	0–3	Florida		Korpisalo	4,069	14–18–8	36
41	April 6	Tampa Bay	2–4	Columbus		Korpisalo	4,080	15–18–8	38
42	April 8	Tampa Bay	6–4	Columbus		Merzlikins	4,143	15–19–8	38
43	April 10	Chicago	4–3	Columbus		Merzlikins	4,502	15–20–8	38
44	April 12	Chicago	4–3	Columbus	OT	Korpisalo	4,093	15–20–9	39
45	April 15	Columbus	1–4	Dallas		Merzlikins	4,201	15–21–9	39
46	April 17	Columbus	1–5	Dallas		Korpisalo	5,643	15–22–9	39
47	April 19	Columbus	2–4	Florida		Merzlikins	4,041	15–23–9	39
48	April 20	Columbus	1–5	Florida		Korpisalo	4,132	15–24–9	39
49	April 22	Columbus	1–3	Tampa Bay		Merzlikins	4,200	15–25–9	39
50	April 25	Columbus	3–4	Tampa Bay	OT	Merzlikins	4,200	15–25–10	40
51	April 27	Detroit	0–1	Columbus	SO	Merzlikins	4,316	16–25–10	42

May: 2–1–2 (home: 2–1–1; road: 0–0–1)
#	Date	Visitor	Score	Home	OT	Decision	Attendance	Record	Pts	Recap
52	May 1	Columbus	1–2	Carolina	OT	Merzlikins	4,987	16–25–11	43
53	May 3	Nashville	4–3	Columbus	OT	Merzlikins	4,210	16–25–12	44
54	May 5	Nashville	2–4	Columbus		Merzlikins	4,084	17–25–12	46
55	May 7	Detroit	5–2	Columbus		Kivlenieks	4,402	17–26–12	46
56	May 8	Detroit	4–5	Columbus	OT	Kivlenieks	4,493	18–26–12	48

Legend: Win (2 points) Loss (0 points) Overtime/shootout loss (1 point)
