= 2020–21 Florida Panthers season =

National Hockey League team season

2020–21 Florida Panthers
- Division: 2nd Central
- 2020–21 record: 37–14–5
- Home record: 20–5–3
- Road record: 17–9–2
- Goals for: 189
- Goals against: 153

Team information
- General manager: Bill Zito
- Coach: Joel Quenneville
- Captain: Aleksander Barkov
- Alternate captains: Aaron Ekblad; Patric Hornqvist; Jonathan Huberdeau; Keith Yandle
- Arena: BB&T Center
- Minor league affiliates: Charlotte Checkers (AHL); Syracuse Crunch (AHL); Greenville Swamp Rabbits (ECHL)

Team leaders
- Goals: Aleksander Barkov (26)
- Assists: Jonathan Huberdeau (41)
- Points: Jonathan Huberdeau (61)
- Penalty minutes: Ryan Lomberg (67)
- Plus/minus: MacKenzie Weegar (+29)
- Wins: Sergei Bobrovsky (19)
- Goals against average: Chris Driedger (2.07)

The 2020–21 Florida Panthers season was the 27th season for the National Hockey League (NHL) franchise that was established in 1993. Head coach Joel Quenneville coached his second season with the team. On December 20, 2020, the league temporarily realigned into four divisions with no conferences due to the COVID-19 pandemic and the ongoing closure of the Canada–United States border. As a result of this realignment, the Panthers would play this season in the Central Division and would only play games against the other teams in their new division during the regular season, and potentially, the first two rounds of the playoffs.

On April 27, the Panthers clinched a playoff berth after a 7–4 win over the Nashville Predators. In the first round, they met their rivals the Tampa Bay Lightning in the playoffs for the first time. They were eliminated with a 4-0 loss in game six on May 26, continuing the league's longest playoff series win drought.

== Standings ==
Central Division
| Pos | Team | GP | W | L | OTL | RW | GF | GA | GD | Pts |
|---|---|---|---|---|---|---|---|---|---|---|
| 1 | y – Carolina Hurricanes | 56 | 36 | 12 | 8 | 27 | 179 | 136 | +43 | 80 |
| 2 | x – Florida Panthers | 56 | 37 | 14 | 5 | 26 | 189 | 153 | +36 | 79 |
| 3 | x – Tampa Bay Lightning | 56 | 36 | 17 | 3 | 29 | 181 | 147 | +34 | 75 |
| 4 | x – Nashville Predators | 56 | 31 | 23 | 2 | 21 | 156 | 154 | +2 | 64 |
| 5 | Dallas Stars | 56 | 23 | 19 | 14 | 17 | 158 | 154 | +4 | 60 |
| 6 | Chicago Blackhawks | 56 | 24 | 25 | 7 | 15 | 161 | 186 | −25 | 55 |
| 7 | Detroit Red Wings | 56 | 19 | 27 | 10 | 17 | 127 | 171 | −44 | 48 |
| 8 | Columbus Blue Jackets | 56 | 18 | 26 | 12 | 12 | 137 | 187 | −50 | 48 |

Source: National Hockey League
Rules for classification: 1) Fewer number of games played (GP, only during regular season); 2) Greater number of regulation wins (RW); 3) Greater number of wins in regulation and overtime, excluding shootout wins (ROW); 4) Greater number of total wins, including shootouts (W); 5) Greater number of points earned in head-to-head play; if teams played an uneven number of head-to-head games, the result of the first game on the home ice of the team with the extra home game is discarded; 6) Greater goal differential (GD); 7) Greater number of goals scored (GF)
x – Clinched playoff spot; y – Clinched division

== Schedule and results ==
=== Regular season ===
The regular season schedule was published on December 23, 2020.

2020–21 game log

January: 5–0–1 (Home: 2–0–0; Road: 3–0–1)
| # | Date | Visitor | Score | Home | OT | Decision | Attendance | Record | Pts | Recap |
|---|---|---|---|---|---|---|---|---|---|---|
| — | January 14 | Dallas | – | Florida | Postponed due to COVID protocol. Rescheduled for February 22. |
| — | January 15 | Dallas | – | Florida | Postponed due to COVID protocol. Rescheduled for May 10. |
| 1 | January 17 | Chicago | 2–5 | Florida | | Driedger | 4,147 | 1–0–0 | 2 |
| 2 | January 19 | Chicago | 4–5 | Florida | OT | Bobrovsky | 3,667 | 2–0–0 | 4 |
| — | January 21 | Florida | – | Carolina | Postponed due to COVID protocol. Rescheduled for February 17. |
| — | January 23 | Florida | – | Carolina | Postponed due to COVID protocol. Rescheduled for March 7. |
| 3 | January 26 | Florida | 4–3 | Columbus | SO | Bobrovsky | 0 | 3–0–0 | 6 |
| 4 | January 28 | Florida | 2–3 | Columbus | SO | Driedger | 0 | 3–0–1 | 7 |
| 5 | January 30 | Florida | 3–2 | Detroit | OT | Bobrovsky | 0 | 4–0–1 | 9 |
| 6 | January 31 | Florida | 3–2 | Detroit | | Driedger | 0 | 5–0–1 | 11 |

February: 8–4–2 (Home: 5–3–2; Road: 3–1–0)
| # | Date | Visitor | Score | Home | OT | Decision | Attendance | Record | Pts | Recap |
|---|---|---|---|---|---|---|---|---|---|---|
| 7 | February 4 | Nashville | 6–5 | Florida | OT | Bobrovsky | 3,698 | 5–0–2 | 12 |
| 8 | February 5 | Nashville | 1–2 | Florida | | Driedger | 3,977 | 6–0–2 | 14 |
| 9 | February 7 | Detroit | 4–1 | Florida | | Driedger | 3,706 | 6–1–2 | 14 |
| 10 | February 9 | Detroit | 1–2 | Florida | | Bobrovsky | 3,477 | 7–1–2 | 16 |
| 11 | February 11 | Tampa Bay | 2–5 | Florida | | Bobrovsky | 3,808 | 8–1–2 | 18 |
| 12 | February 13 | Tampa Bay | 6–1 | Florida | | Bobrovsky | 4,509 | 8–2–2 | 18 |
| 13 | February 15 | Florida | 6–4 | Tampa Bay | | Driedger | 100 | 9–2–2 | 20 |
| 14 | February 17 | Florida | 4–3 | Carolina | OT | Driedger | 0 | 10–2–2 | 22 |
| 15 | February 19 | Florida | 7–2 | Detroit | | Driedger | 0 | 11–2–2 | 24 |
| 16 | February 20 | Florida | 1–2 | Detroit | | Bobrovsky | 0 | 11–3–2 | 24 |
| 17 | February 22 | Dallas | 1–3 | Florida | | Driedger | 3,510 | 12–3–2 | 26 |
| 18 | February 24 | Dallas | 3–0 | Florida | | Driedger | 3,324 | 12–4–2 | 26 |
| 19 | February 25 | Dallas | 2–3 | Florida | | Bobrovsky | 3,844 | 13–4–2 | 28 |
| 20 | February 27 | Carolina | 4–3 | Florida | SO | Bobrovsky | 4,281 | 13–4–3 | 29 |

March: 10–5–1 (Home: 4–1–1; Road: 6–4–0)
| # | Date | Visitor | Score | Home | OT | Decision | Attendance | Record | Pts | Recap |
|---|---|---|---|---|---|---|---|---|---|---|
| 21 | March 1 | Carolina | 3–2 | Florida | OT | Driedger | 3,817 | 13–4–4 | 30 |
| 22 | March 4 | Florida | 5–4 | Nashville | | Bobrovsky | — (Note: Spectators were in attendance, but the exact number was not reported.) | 14–4–4 | 32 |
| 23 | March 6 | Florida | 6–2 | Nashville | | Bobrovsky | — | 15–4–4 | 34 |
| 24 | March 7 | Florida | 2–4 | Carolina | | Driedger | 2,924 | 15–5–4 | 34 |
| 25 | March 9 | Florida | 4–2 | Columbus | | Bobrovsky | 3,448 | 16–5–4 | 36 |
| 26 | March 11 | Florida | 5–4 | Columbus | OT | Bobrovsky | 3,739 | 17–5–4 | 38 |
| 27 | March 13 | Chicago | 2–4 | Florida | | Bobrovsky | 4,721 | 18–5–4 | 40 |
| 28 | March 15 | Chicago | 3–6 | Florida | | Bobrovsky | 4,512 | 19–5–4 | 42 |
| 29 | March 18 | Nashville | 2–1 | Florida | | Bobrovsky | 4,559 | 19–6–4 | 42 |
| 30 | March 20 | Nashville | 0–2 | Florida | | Driedger | 4,358 | 20–6–4 | 44 |
| 31 | March 21 | Florida | 3–5 | Tampa Bay | | Bobrovsky | 3,800 | 20–7–4 | 44 |
| 32 | March 23 | Florida | 2–3 | Chicago | | Driedger | 0 | 20–8–4 | 44 |
| 33 | March 25 | Florida | 0–3 | Chicago | | Bobrovsky | 0 | 20–9–4 | 44 |
| 34 | March 27 | Florida | 4–3 | Dallas | OT | Bobrovsky | 4,209 | 21–9–4 | 46 |
| 35 | March 28 | Florida | 4–1 | Dallas | | Driedger | 4,026 | 22–9–4 | 48 |
| 36 | March 30 | Detroit | 1–4 | Florida | | Bobrovsky | 4,321 | 23–9–4 | 50 |

April: 10–5–1 (Home: 6–1–1; Road: 4–4–0)
| # | Date | Visitor | Score | Home | OT | Decision | Attendance | Record | Pts | Recap |
|---|---|---|---|---|---|---|---|---|---|---|
| 37 | April 1 | Detroit | 2–3 | Florida | OT | Driedger | 4,359 | 24–9–4 | 52 |
| 38 | April 3 | Columbus | 2–5 | Florida | | Bobrovsky | 4,375 | 25–9–4 | 54 |
| 39 | April 4 | Columbus | 0–3 | Florida | | Driedger | 4,069 | 26–9–4 | 56 |
| 40 | April 6 | Florida | 2–5 | Carolina | | Bobrovsky | 4,987 | 26–10–4 | 56 |
| 41 | April 8 | Florida | 0–3 | Carolina | | Driedger | 4,987 | 26–11–4 | 56 |
| 42 | April 10 | Florida | 1–4 | Dallas | | Bobrovsky | 4,165 | 26–12–4 | 56 |
| 43 | April 13 | Florida | 3–2 | Dallas | OT | Driedger | 4,199 | 27–12–4 | 58 |
| 44 | April 15 | Florida | 2–3 | Tampa Bay | OT | Driedger | 3,800 | 27–12–5 | 59 |
| 45 | April 17 | Florida | 5–3 | Tampa Bay | | Bobrovsky | 3,800 | 28–12–5 | 61 |
| 46 | April 19 | Columbus | 2–4 | Florida | | Bobrovsky | 4,041 | 29–12–5 | 63 |
| 47 | April 20 | Columbus | 1–5 | Florida | | Knight | 4,132 | 30–12–5 | 65 |
| 48 | April 22 | Carolina | 4–2 | Florida | | Bobrovsky | 4,683 | 30–13–5 | 65 |
| 49 | April 24 | Carolina | 3–4 | Florida | OT | Driedger | 4,838 | 31–13–5 | 67 |
| 50 | April 26 | Florida | 1–4 | Nashville | | Driedger | — | 31–14–5 | 67 |
| 51 | April 27 | Florida | 7–4 | Nashville | | Knight | — | 32–14–5 | 69 |
| 52 | April 29 | Florida | 4–3 | Chicago | OT | Knight | 0 | 33–14–5 | 71 |

May: 4–0–0 (Home: 3–0–0; Road: 1–0–0)
| # | Date | Visitor | Score | Home | OT | Decision | Attendance | Record | Pts | Recap |
|---|---|---|---|---|---|---|---|---|---|---|
| 53 | May 1 | Florida | 5–4 | Chicago | | Bobrovsky | 0 | 34–14–5 | 73 |
| 54 | May 3 | Dallas | 4–5 | Florida | OT | Knight | 4,702 | 35–14–5 | 75 |
| 55 | May 8 | Tampa Bay | 1–5 | Florida | | Bobrovsky | 5,040 | 36–14–5 | 77 |
| 56 | May 10 | Tampa Bay | 0–4 | Florida | | Driedger | 5,040 | 37–14–5 | 79 |

Legend: Win (2 points) Loss (0 points) Overtime/shootout loss (1 point) Postponement

=== Playoffs ===
2021 Stanley Cup playoffs

Central Division First Round vs. (C3) Tampa Bay Lightning: Tampa Bay won 4–2
| # | Date | Visitor | Score | Home | OT | Decision | Attendance | Series | Recap |
|---|---|---|---|---|---|---|---|---|---|
| 1 | May 16 | Tampa Bay | 5–4 | Florida | | Bobrovsky | 9,646 | 0–1 |
| 2 | May 18 | Tampa Bay | 3–1 | Florida | | Driedger | 9,646 | 0–2 |
| 3 | May 20 | Florida | 6–5 | Tampa Bay | OT | Bobrovsky | 9,508 | 1–2 |
| 4 | May 22 | Florida | 2–6 | Tampa Bay | | Bobrovsky | 9,762 | 1–3 |
| 5 | May 24 | Tampa Bay | 1–4 | Florida | | Knight | 11,551 | 2–3 |
| 6 | May 26 | Florida | 0–4 | Tampa Bay | | Knight | 10,092 | 2–4 |

Legend: Win Loss

== Draft picks ==
Below are the Florida Panthers selection at the 2020 NHL Draft which was held on October 6–7 at NHL Network Studios.

| Round | # | Player | Pos | Nationally | College/Junior/Club team (league) |
|---|---|---|---|---|---|
| 1 | 12 | Anton Lundell | (C) | Finland | HIFK (Liiga) |
| 2 | 43 | Emil Heineman | (LW) | Sweden | Leksands IF (SHL) |
| 3 | 74 | Ty Smilanic | (C) | United States | U.S. NTDP (USHL) |
| 3 | 87 | Justin Sourdif | (RW) | Canada | Vancouver Giants (WHL) |
| 4 | 105 | Zachry Uens | (D) | Canada | Merrimack Warriors (H-East) |
| 5 | 153 | Kasper Puutio | (D) | Finland | Everett Slivertips (WHL) |
| 7 | 198 | Elliot Ekmark | (C) | Sweden | Linkoping J20 (SuperElit) |
| 7 | 212 | Devon Levi | (G) | Canada | Carleton Place Canadians (CCHL) |
