= Jason Robertson =

American ice hockey player (born 1999)

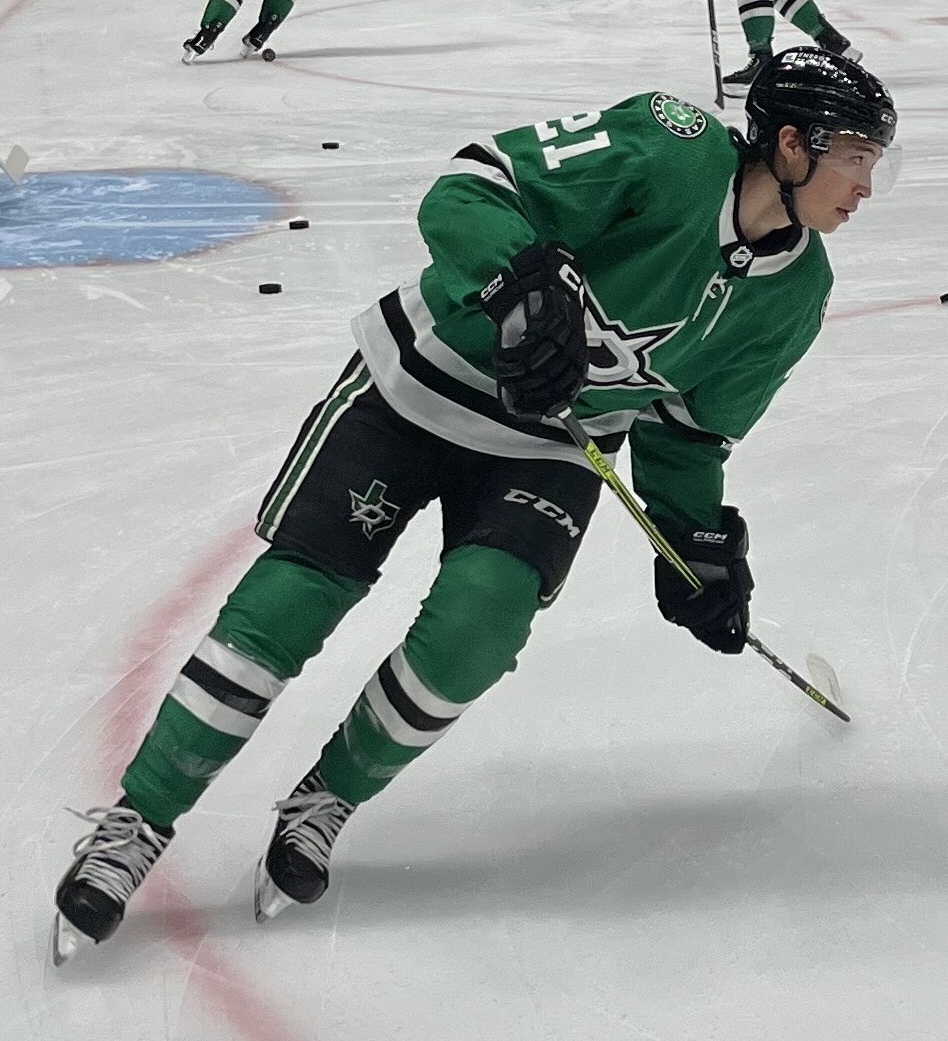
- Robertson with the Dallas Stars in February 2024
- Born: July 22, 1999 (age 27) Arcadia, California, U.S.
- Height: 6 ft 3 in (191 cm)
- Weight: 204 lb (93 kg; 14 st 8 lb)
- Position: Left wing
- Shoots: Left
- NHL team: Dallas Stars
- National team: United States
- NHL draft: 39th overall, 2017; Dallas Stars
- Playing career: 2019–present

Jason Robertson (born July 22, 1999) is an American professional ice hockey player who is a left winger for the Dallas Stars of the National Hockey League (NHL). The Stars selected him in the second round, 39th overall, of the 2017 NHL entry draft.

Robertson was born in Arcadia, California, but his family moved to Northville, Michigan, when he was 10 to increase his opportunities for ice hockey. He played for the Little Caesars and Detroit Kings minor ice hockey teams in Michigan before he was drafted by the Kingston Frontenacs of the Ontario Hockey League in 2015. Robertson's 18 goals in his first season with Kingston were the most of any rookie since Anthony Stewart, and in the next two years, he became the first Frontenac to record back-to-back 40-goal seasons since Michael Zigomanis. Robertson was traded to the Niagara IceDogs partway through the 2018–19 OHL season, during which he recorded 117 points in 62 games to win both the Eddie Powers Memorial Trophy and the CHL Top Scorer Award.

Joining the Stars for the 2019–20 season, Robertson spent most of the year with the Texas Stars, Dallas's American Hockey League affiliate. He was included in Dallas's quarantine bubble for the 2020 Stanley Cup playoffs but did not appear in a game. Robertson made Dallas's opening night roster the following season, where he was the Calder Memorial Trophy runner-up with 17 goals and 28 assists in 51 games. Robertson continued his offensive production during the 2021–22 season, becoming the first player in Dallas Stars history to record hat-tricks in consecutive games. He was named an All-Star in 2022–23 en route to recording his first 100-point season.

== Early life ==
Robertson was born on July 22, 1999, in Arcadia, California, to Mercedes and Hugh Robertson. Beginning with Robertson's older brother Michael, all of Mercedes and Hugh's children were childhood hockey fans, and the family owned season tickets to see the Los Angeles Kings at the Staples Center. Robertson began playing hockey around the age of four or five, and when he was 10 years old, the family moved to Northville, Michigan, where there were more opportunities for him to ice skate. He played minor ice hockey for a number of teams there, including Little Caesars and the Detroit Kings AAA team before spending a season with the Don Mills Flyers of the Greater Toronto Hockey League. With the Flyers, he scored 28 goals and recorded 33 assists for a total of 61 points. Robertson also played in the 2015 OHL Cup, where his team finished second to the Toronto Marlboros.

== Playing career ==
=== Junior ===
The Omaha Lancers of the United States Hockey League (USHL) selected Robertson in Phase I of the 2015 USHL draft, but he instead committed to begin his junior ice hockey career with the Kingston Frontenacs of the Ontario Hockey League (OHL), who drafted him in the second round, 62nd overall, of the 2015 OHL Priority Selection. He impressed head coach Paul McFarland during rookie camp and made the Frontenacs' 2015–16 opening day roster at 16, the youngest possible age for junior ice hockey. He recorded his first OHL goal on October 7 against the Oshawa Generals, and on December 11, he scored his first junior hat-trick, leading Kingston to a 4–1 victory over the Sault Ste. Marie Greyhounds. By the OHL's Christmas break, Robertson had 16 goals for the Frontenacs, three of which came on the power play, as well as eight assists and a +2 plus–minus rating. Those 16 goals were the most of any rookie born in 1999 by that point of the OHL season. He finished the 2015–16 season as the Frontenacs' leading rookie scorer with 18 goals and 32 points in 54 games. Those 18 goals were the most by any Kingston 16-year-old since Anthony Stewart 14 years prior. That September, Robertson participated in the 2016 CCM/USA Hockey All-American Prospects Game at the Wells Fargo Center in Philadelphia, Pennsylvania.

Following his breakout rookie performance, Robertson began the 2016–17 OHL season playing on Kingston's top offensive line with Warren Foegele and Ted Nichol. While the team as a whole struggled to score at the beginning of the season, with only 21 goals through their first nine games, Robertson led the team in scoring with three goals and seven points through that same stretch. After Foegele was traded to the Erie Otters halfway through the season, Robertson became an offensive leader for Kingston, with 26 goals and 47 points in 33 regular season games after the trade. Although the Frontenacs' 179 goals were the fewest of any OHL team during the 2016–17 season, Robertson finished with 42 goals and 81 points in 68 regular season games. Those 42 goals made up 24 percent of the Frontenacs' total scoring. He added another five goals and 18 points in 11 postseason games before the Frontenacs were swept by the Peterborough Petes in the second round of OHL playoffs. The NHL Central Scouting Bureau had named Robertson the No. 34 draft-eligible North American skater in their midterm rankings, but he finished the season at No. 14 overall. That June, the Dallas Stars of the National Hockey League (NHL) selected Robertson in the second round, 39th overall, of the 2017 NHL entry draft.

After attending the Stars' 2017 training camp, Robertson returned to Kingston, where he was named one of four rotating assistant captains for the 2017–18 season. He found strong line chemistry with Linus Nyman at his other wing: by November 9, both wingers had 20 goals apiece, with most of Nyman's assists coming on Robertson's goals. The Nyman—Robertson line found a center in the second half of the season in Gabriel Vilardi. By the halfway point of the season, Robertson led the Frontenacs with 20 goals and 42 points in 33 games. He also led the OHL with 158 shots, recording at least one shot in every game to that point. On March 7, 2018, in a 5–3 loss to the Oshawa Generals, Robertson scored his 100th career OHL goal. Robertson finished the regular season with 41 goals and a team-leading 87 points in 68 games, also becoming the first Frontenac to record 40 goals in consecutive seasons since Mike Zigomanis in 2000 and 2001. He added another 18 points in 16 postseason games before the Hamilton Bulldogs defeated the Frontenacs in the third round of OHL playoffs. At the end of the season, Robertson was named to the OHL All-Star Third Team. Once the junior hockey season ended, Robertson signed a three-year entry-level contract with the Stars, as well as an amateur tryout contract to join the Texas Stars, Dallas's American Hockey League (AHL) affiliate, for their own playoff run. He struggled to keep up with the AHL players in practice, however, and was sent home in the middle of the playoffs to focus on training for the next season.

Returning to the Frontenacs as an assistant captain, Robertson began the 2018–19 season on an offensive tear: by mid-November, he led the OHL with 22 goals in as many games and was seventh in the league with 33 points. He scored 38.6 percent of the Frontenacs' 57 goals and either scored or assisted on 57.9 percent. After recording two hat-tricks in the same week, first against the Ottawa 67's and then the Oshawa Generals, Robertson was named both the OHL On the Run Player of the Week and a Canadian Hockey League Top Performer of the Week for the week ending November 11. On November 20, the week after receiving these accolades, Robertson and defenseman Jacob Paquette were traded to the Niagara IceDogs for Billy Constantinou, Ian Martin, and 11 draft picks. At the time of the trade, Robertson had 23 goals and 15 assists in 24 games.

Robertson continued his offensive performance on his new team, with eight goals and 22 points for Niagara by the midseason break, and he was named the OHL Player of the Month in November after recording 12 goals and 30 points in 12 games between the two teams. With two assists in a 6–4 win over the North Bay Battalion on March 1, Robertson recorded both his 100th point of the 2018–19 season and his 300th career OHL point. In the final week of the regular season, Robertson recorded 11 points in three games to clinch the OHL Central Division title for the IceDogs. With 48 goals and 117 points in 62 games, including 25 goals and 79 points in 38 games for Niagara, Robertson won both the 2019 Eddie Powers Memorial Trophy for the OHL's regular season scoring leader and the CHL Top Scorer Award. He then added another 10 points in as many postseason games before the Oshawa Generals eliminated the IceDogs in the second round of playoffs. Robertson closed out the 2018–19 OHL awards season with a selection to the All-Star First Team. He finished his OHL career with 149 goals and 317 points in 252 games.

=== Professional ===
Robertson was one of the final cuts that the Dallas Stars made as they reduced their roster to 23 for the start of the 2019–20 season. He instead joined the AHL as the Texas Stars' third line winger. Adjusting to the quicker pace of professional hockey, Robertson recorded 13 goals and 12 assists through his first 39 games in Texas. On February 13, 2020, following an injury to Alexander Radulov, the Dallas Stars called Robertson up for his NHL debut. He debuted that night, recording his first NHL assist on Tyler Seguin's goal during the Stars' 3–2 victory over the Toronto Maple Leafs. That was his only point in his three-game call-up before he was sent back down to the AHL on February 17. By the time that the COVID-19 pandemic suddenly halted both the NHL and AHL regular season, Robertson had 25 goals and 47 points in 60 games for the Texas Stars. Robertson was one of several young prospects who traveled with the Stars to the 2020 Stanley Cup playoffs, but he was invited primarily to watch the team and did not play during Dallas's playoff run.

A COVID-19 outbreak and several injuries postponed the start of the Dallas Stars' 2020–21 regular season and forced them to retool their roster. Robertson was named to the team's opening night roster as a fourth-line winger alongside Nick Caamano and Jason Dickinson. After playing in the first two games of the season, Robertson was demoted to Dallas's taxi squad for a five-game stretch. He returned at the start of February, and on February 7, Robertson scored his first NHL goal when he deflected a shot from Miro Heiskanen past Malcolm Subban of the Chicago Blackhawks. In the month following that goal, Robertson began producing offensively for Dallas, with three goals and eight points in his next 11 games. By April 11, Robertson's 27 points were second only to Kirill Kaprizov's 40 among rookie scorers. He was named the NHL Rookie of the Month in April after recording eight goals and 18 points, including at least one point in 13 of 17 games. While the Stars narrowly missed the 2021 Stanley Cup playoffs, Robertson finished the season with 17 goals and a rookie-leading 28 assists in 51 games. In addition to being named to the 2020–21 NHL All-Rookie Team, Robertson was the runner-up for the Calder Memorial Trophy, given to the top rookie in the NHL. The award was won by Kaprizov of the Minnesota Wild. Because Robertson was still on his entry-level contract at the time of the 2021 NHL expansion draft, he was automatically protected from being drafted by the Seattle Kraken.

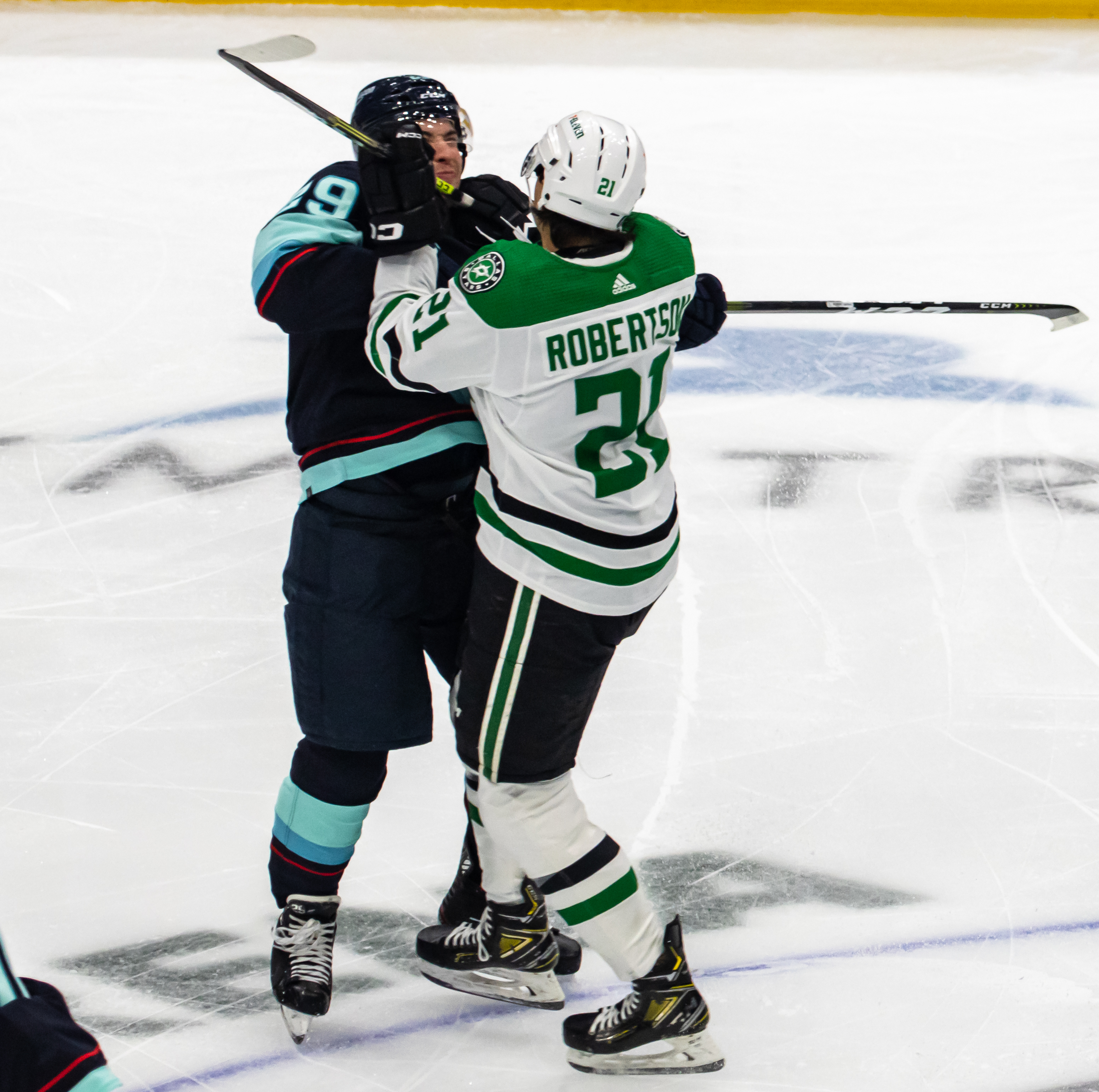
Robertson battling with Vince Dunn during the 2023 Stanley Cup playoffs

Robertson missed the first seven games of the 2021–22 season with a shoulder injury but returned at the end of October to continue the scoring pace he had set the previous season. Playing on the top line with Roope Hintz and Joe Pavelski, Robertson recorded 17 points in his first 15 games of the season. On December 2, Robertson scored on Daniil Tarasov only 68 seconds into the Stars' game against the Columbus Blue Jackets. It was the fourth game in a row in which Dallas had scored within the first 75 seconds of the game, an NHL record. Three months later, on March 4, 2022, Robertson recorded his first NHL hat-trick in his 100th career game, a 4–3 overtime win against the Winnipeg Jets. He recorded another hat-trick two days later, this time during a 6–3 victory over the Minnesota Wild. He was the first Dallas Stars player ever to record hat-tricks in consecutive games, the first NHL player under the age of 23 to do so since Filip Forsberg in 2017, and the first of any NHL player since Alexander Ovechkin in January 2020. Robertson finished the regular season with 41 goals and 79 points in 74 games. He scored the most goals of any player since Jamie Benn during the 2015–16 season, and was only the fourth member of the Stars to reach the 40-goal mark following their relocation to Dallas. The Stars faced the Calgary Flames in the first round of the 2022 Stanley Cup playoffs, with Robertson making his postseason debut in Game 1. He struggled in the series, with only one assist through four games, and he was moved off of the top line for Game 5. On his new line with Benn and Tyler Seguin, Robertson scored his first postseason goal in Game 5. The Flames defeated the Stars in seven games, and Robertson finished his first playoff series with one goal and four points.

On October 5, 2022, after missing training camp and a majority of the preseason, Robertson signed a four-year contract with the Stars. He made the Stars' opening roster for the 2022–23 NHL season and recorded an assist in the first game. Robertson then recorded three points in the second game of the season. In January 2023, Robertson was chosen to represent the Dallas Stars in the 2023 NHL All-Star Game, his first time being selected.

== International play ==
Medal record

Men's ice hockey

Representing the United States

World Championships
Bronze medal – third place	2021 Latvia	

World Junior Championships
Silver medal – second place	2019 Vancouver	

Robertson first represented the United States in international ice hockey when he played for the national junior team at the 2019 World Junior Championships. He finished the tournament with one goal and seven points in seven games, while the United States took the silver medal in the tournament, losing 3–2 to Finland in the championship match.

Robertson, joined by Jake Oettinger and Ryan Shea, was one of three young members of the Stars to represent the United States at the 2021 World Championship. Skating on a line with Trevor Moore of the Los Angeles Kings and Conor Garland of the Arizona Coyotes, Robertson was named team's player of the game for scoring the team's only goal in their 2–1 opening-round loss to Finland. He was named the player of the game again with one goal and one assist in the 6–1 bronze medal victory over Germany. Robertson finished the tournament with four goals and nine points in 10 games.

== Personal life ==
Robertson is of Filipino descent on his mother's side and Scottish on his father's. His mother was born in Manila and immigrated to the United States when she was three years old. He is the third hockey player of Filipino descent to play in the NHL, following Tim Stapleton and Matt Dumba, and the second Filipino American, after Stapleton. Robertson's younger brother Nick was selected by the Toronto Maple Leafs in the second round of the 2019 NHL entry draft.

Robertson is nicknamed "Robo" by his teammates.

== Career statistics ==
=== Regular season and playoffs ===
			Regular season					Playoffs
Season	Team	League	GP	G	A	Pts	PIM	GP	G	A	Pts	PIM
2015–16	Kingston Frontenacs	OHL	54	18	14	32	6	4	1	1	2	2
2016–17	Kingston Frontenacs	OHL	68	42	39	81	29	11	5	13	18	0
2017–18	Kingston Frontenacs	OHL	68	41	46	87	36	16	10	8	18	8
2018–19	Kingston Frontenacs	OHL	24	23	15	38	18	—	—	—	—	—
2018–19	Niagara IceDogs	OHL	38	25	54	79	24	10	7	3	10	11
2019–20	Texas Stars	AHL	60	25	22	47	28	—	—	—	—	—
2019–20	Dallas Stars	NHL	3	0	1	1	0	—	—	—	—	—
2020–21	Dallas Stars	NHL	51	17	28	45	16	—	—	—	—	—
2021–22	Dallas Stars	NHL	74	41	38	79	22	7	1	3	4	0
2022–23	Dallas Stars	NHL	82	46	63	109	20	19	7	11	18	2
2023–24	Dallas Stars	NHL	82	29	51	80	22	19	6	10	16	0
2024–25	Dallas Stars	NHL	82	35	45	80	18	11	4	2	6	2
2025–26	Dallas Stars	NHL	82	45	51	96	32	6	5	3	8	2
NHL totals			456	213	277	490	130	62	23	29	52	6

=== International ===
Year	Team	Event	Results	GP	G	A	Pts	PIM
2019	United States	WJC	2nd place, silver medalist(s)	7	1	6	7	4
2021	United States	WC	3rd place, bronze medalist(s)	10	4	5	9	10
Junior totals				7	1	6	7	4
Senior totals				10	4	5	9	10

== Awards and honors ==
Award	Year	Ref.
OHL / CHL
OHL Third All-Star Team	2018	
OHL First All-Star Team	2019	
Eddie Powers Memorial Trophy	2019	
CHL Top Scorer Award	2019	
NHL
All-Rookie Team	2021	
All-Star Game	2023	
First All-Star team	2023, 2026	
