= Craig Conroy =

American ice hockey player (born 1971)

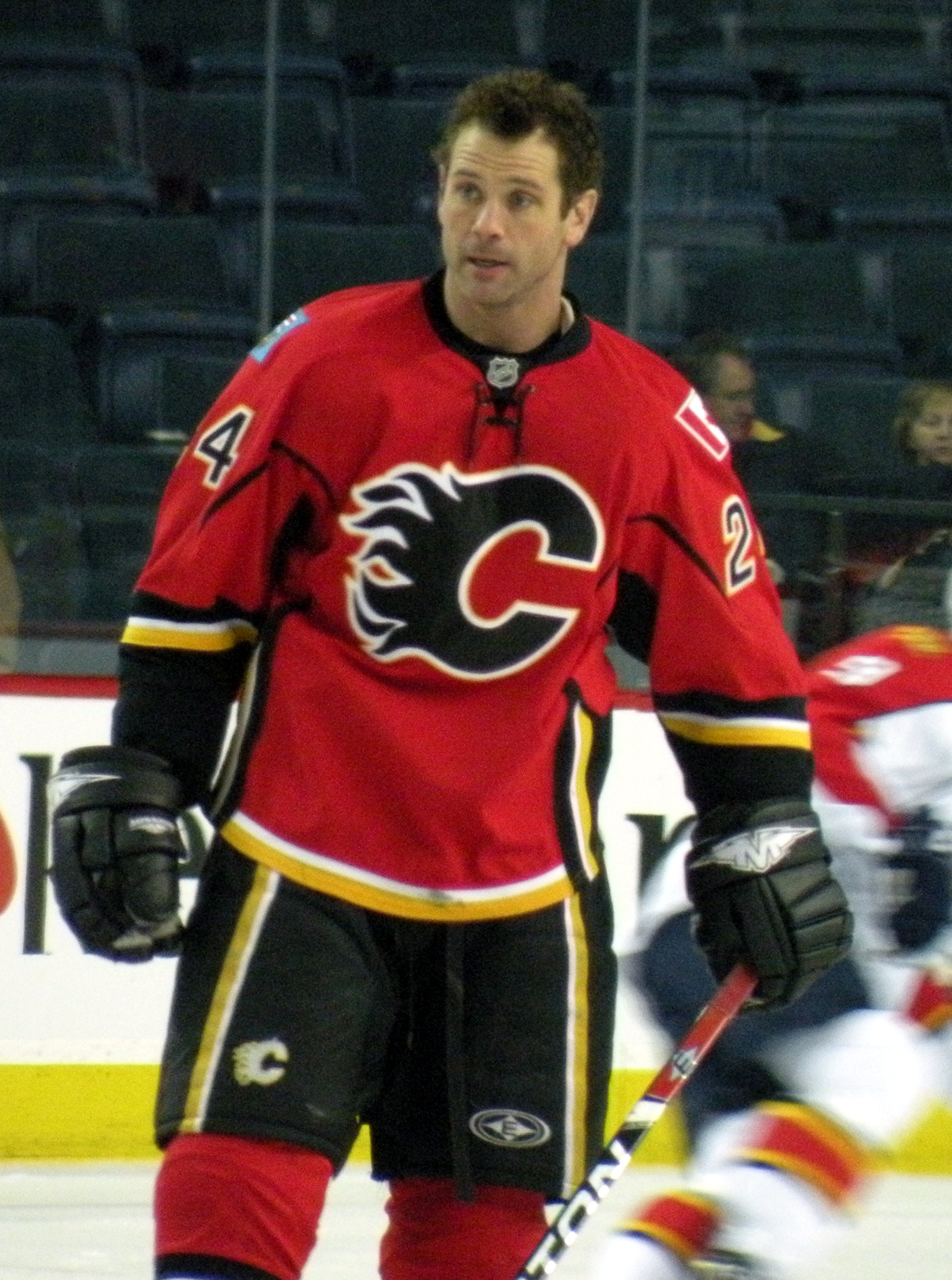
- Conroy with the Calgary Flames in 2008
- Born: September 4, 1971 (age 54) Potsdam, New York, U.S.
- Height: 6 ft 2 in (188 cm)
- Weight: 193 lb (88 kg; 13 st 11 lb)
- Position: Center
- Shot: Right
- Played for: Montreal Canadiens; St. Louis Blues; Calgary Flames; Los Angeles Kings
- National team: United States
- NHL draft: 123rd overall, 1990; Montreal Canadiens
- Playing career: 1994–2011

Craig Michael Conroy (born September 4, 1971) is an American former professional ice hockey player and current executive. He serves as the general manager of the Calgary Flames of the National Hockey League (NHL), for whom he also played. A sixth-round selection of the Montreal Canadiens at the 1990 NHL entry draft, Conroy played 1,009 NHL games for the Canadiens, St. Louis Blues, Flames and Los Angeles Kings during a professional career that spanned from 1994 to 2011. Internationally, he twice played with the United States National Team – at the 2004 World Cup of Hockey and the 2006 Winter Olympics.

Developed as a defensive specialist through much of his career, Conroy was twice a finalist for the Frank J. Selke Trophy as the NHL's top defensive forward, and was nominated for the Lady Byng Memorial Trophy. He played over 1,000 games in the NHL and was the second-oldest player in League history to reach that milestone. Conroy, who spent multiple productive offensive seasons with the Flames, is a former captain of the team and was twice honored by the organization for his leadership, dedication and humanitarian efforts {{citation needed}}.

== Early life ==
An only child, Conroy was born and raised in Potsdam, New York. He attended high school at Northwood School. His father Mike played minor league hockey for the Syracuse Blazers and at the age of four years Conroy served as the team's mascot prior to games.

Conroy followed in the footsteps of his father and two uncles in playing hockey at Clarkson University for the Golden Knights. He enrolled at Clarkson in 1990 and played four seasons for the school. During his junior season of 1992–93, Conroy scored two goals in a 5–3 victory over Rensselaer Polytechnic Institute in the Eastern College Athletic Conference (ECAC) semi-final to help lead his team to the conference championship game. Conroy reached 100 career points with the goals, joining his father Mike as the only such pair in Clarkson's history to reach that milestone. Conroy and the Golden Knights then won the ECAC title with a 3–1 victory over Brown University.

The Golden Knights made Conroy a co-captain in his senior year of 1993–94. He led the ECAC in scoring with 66 points and was named to the conference's First All-Star Team, the National Collegiate Athletic Association (NCAA) First All-Star Team and the NCAA Final Four All-Tournament Team. He was also a finalist for the Hobey Baker Award as top player in the NCAA, finishing second to Chris Marinucci. His Clarkson jersey (number 7) was retired in a ceremony prior to a game against College of Holy Cross on October 20, 2012, in which he and his family attended.

== Professional career ==
=== Montreal and St. Louis ===
Conroy was selected in the sixth round, 123rd overall, at the 1990 NHL entry draft by the Montreal Canadiens. He turned professional in 1994 upon completing his college career at Clarkson. At his first day of his first training camp with Montreal, he got into a fight with the team's star goaltender, Patrick Roy, after striking the latter with a slap shot in practice. He spent the majority of the 1994–95 season in the American Hockey League (AHL) with the Fredericton Canadiens, scoring 26 goals and 44 points in 55 games. He appeared in six games for Montreal that year. He played his first NHL game on February 15, 1995, against the Hartford Whalers, and scored his first goal one night later against the New York Rangers. Though he was an offensive star at Clarkson and Fredericton, the Canadiens sought to convert him to a defensive specialist in the NHL.

While he averaged over one point per game with Fredericton in 1995–96, Conroy again played only a handful of games with Montreal. He again began 1996–97 in the AHL, but was traded along with Pierre Turgeon and Rory Fitzpatrick to the St. Louis Blues in exchange for Murray Baron, Shayne Corson and a draft pick on October 29, 1996. Conroy appeared in five games with the Worcester IceCats in the AHL, but after earning a recall to St. Louis, established himself as a regular in the NHL and appeared in 61 games with the Blues that season. Head Coach Joel Quenneville worked to develop Conroy's abilities as a defensive forward and top faceoff specialist. Conroy responded in 1997–98 by improving to 43 points and a career-high plus-minus rating of +20. In recognition of his season, he was named a finalist for both the Frank J. Selke Trophy as the NHL's top defensive forward and the Lady Byng Memorial Trophy as its most gentlemanly player.

Conroy remained one of the League's top defensive forwards in 1998–99. While he missed several games with a high ankle sprain, he scored his first career hat-trick on February 26, 1999, against the Calgary Flames and finished sixth in Selke Trophy voting that season. He faced a difficult season in 1999–2000, however, as Joel Quenneville adopted a new strategy that abandoned the concept of a checking line. Conroy struggled at both ends of the ice, and frequently found his ice time limited as a result. He finished the season with just 27 points.

Looking to improve their team for a playoff run in 2000–01, the Blues dealt Conroy, along with a draft pick, to the Calgary Flames for Cory Stillman. The trade was initially unpopular in Calgary, as the Flames had given up their leading scorer for Conroy, who noted that that was when he "learned not to read the papers or watch TV."

=== Calgary and Los Angeles ===
Opinion of the deal shifted considerably the following season as Conroy established himself as the Flames' first line center alongside Jarome Iginla. The pair developed good chemistry and became strong friends. Conroy scored career highs with 28 goals and 75 points, while Iginla reached the 50-goal plateau for the first time and led the NHL in scoring. Iginla credited Conroy for making his breakout season possible. Additionally, Conroy was named a finalist for the Selke Trophy for a second time. The Flames named him a co-captain along with Bob Boughner late in the 2001–02 season, and he was the only captain in 2002–03.

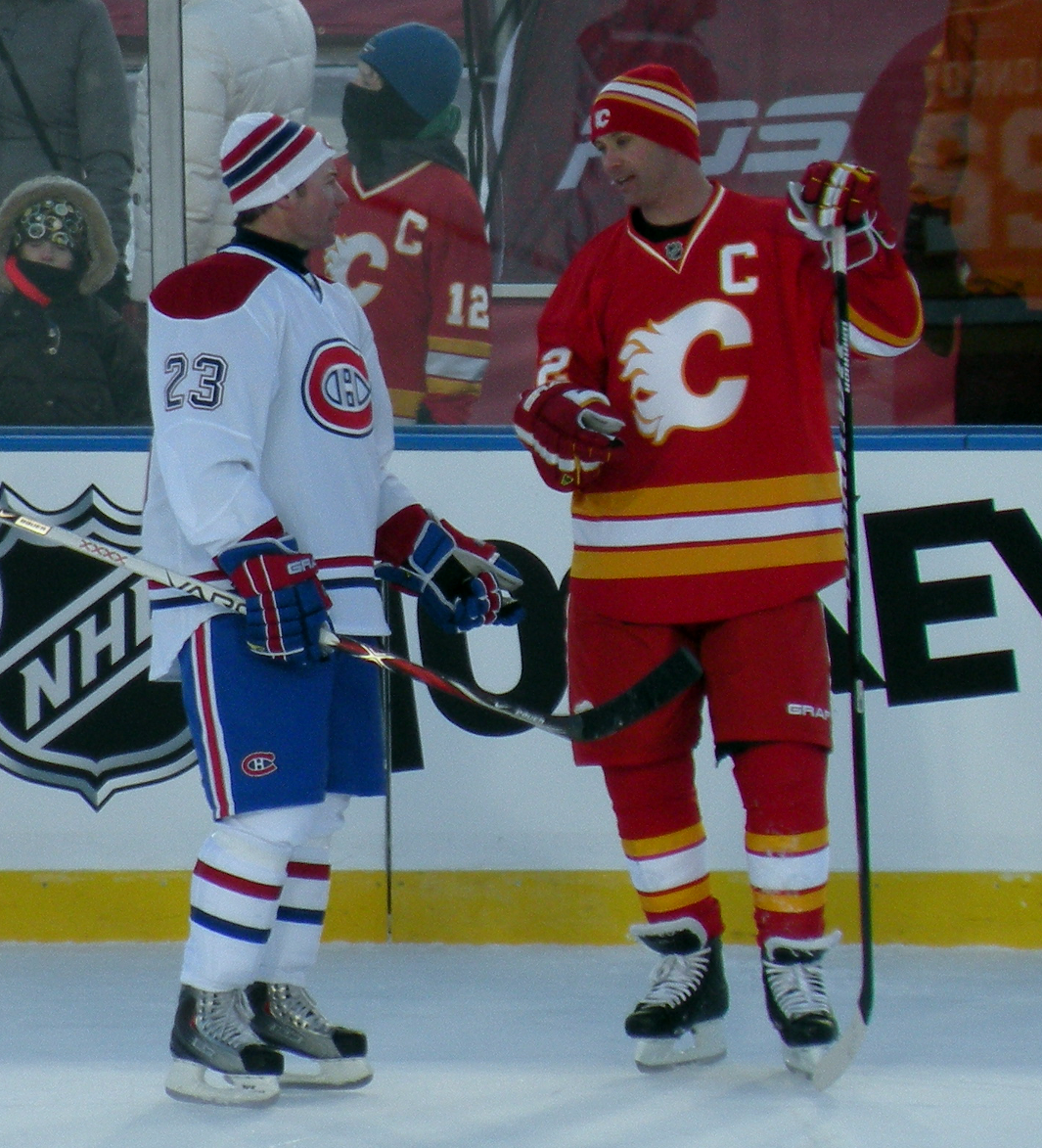
Conroy (right) talks with former teammate Martin Gélinas during the alumni game at the 2011 Heritage Classic.

Conroy was the Flames second-leading scorer in 2002–03 with 59 points and again in 2003–04 when he scored 47 points despite missing 19 games with a knee injury. Shortly before the 2003–04 season began, Conroy gave up the captaincy after having decided it was time for Iginla to take over leadership of the team. He reached two milestones that season; he scored his 300th career point against the Vancouver Canucks on November 29, 2003 and played his 600th game against the Detroit Red Wings on March 16, 2004. The Flames qualified for the 2004 playoffs, their first trip to the post-season in eight seasons. Conroy was a key player for the team as they upset the top three seeds in the Western Conference, the Canucks, Red Wings and San Jose Sharks en route to a seventh game loss to the Tampa Bay Lightning in the Stanley Cup Finals. He finished second on the team in playoff scoring with 17 points. Following the season, Conroy was named to play with Team USA at the 2004 World Cup of Hockey, but appeared in only two games for the team.

Conroy left the Flames as a free agent following the playoff run, opting to sign a four-year, US$12 million contract with the Los Angeles Kings. He later admitted that he did not truly wish to leave the Flames, but facing financial uncertainty with the 2004–05 NHL lockout looming, Conroy chose to accept the guaranteed contract. The lockout wiped out the first year of the deal, but he returned in 2005–06 to reach the 20-goal mark for the third time and 60 points for the second time in his career. During that season, he joined the United States national team for a second time, playing in the 2006 Winter Olympics. He appeared in six games, scoring one goal and five points for the eighth place Americans.

Conroy struggled under new coach Marc Crawford early in the 2006–07 season, falling to five goals and 16 points in 52 games for the Kings before he was traded back to the Flames on January 29, 2007, in exchange for Jamie Lundmark and two draft picks. An emotional Conroy, who said he was happy to return to Calgary, scored two goals the following night in his second debut with the Flames to defeat his former Kings teammates, 4–1. Conroy finished the season by scoring 21 points in 28 games for Calgary, then scored 34 points in 2007–08.

The Flames re-signed Conroy to a new contract prior to the 2008–09 season and named him an alternate captain. He scored his 500th career point on January 3, 2009, when he assisted on Todd Bertuzzi's game-winning goal in a 3–2 win against the Nashville Predators, and finished the year with 48 points. The 2009–10 season proved a difficult one for Conroy, as he scored only three goals and 12 assists during a season shortened by wrist and knee injures along with a broken foot. He returned for another season as the Flames re-signed him to a one-year, two-way contract for the League minimum of $500,000. At the age of 39 years, Conroy played his 1,000th NHL game, against the Colorado Avalanche, on October 28, 2010. Only Grant Ledyard was older (age 40) when he reached that milestone.

Conroy played only nine more games after passing the milestone, and last played on December 20 against the Minnesota Wild. A healthy scratch in 32 of 50 games, and 28 of his final 29, Conroy was waived on January 25, 2011. After going unclaimed, he was left with the option of joining Calgary's AHL affiliate in Abbotsford or retiring. One week later, on February 4, 2011, Conroy formally announced his retirement.

== Post-playing career ==
Upon his retirement, Conroy accepted a management position with the Flames organization, becoming the special assistant to General Manager Jay Feaster. On June 6, 2014, Conroy was promoted to the position of assistant general manager, reporting to GM Brad Treliving. On May 23, 2023, Conroy was announced as the eighth general manager in Flames history, following the departure of Treliving.

== Off the ice ==
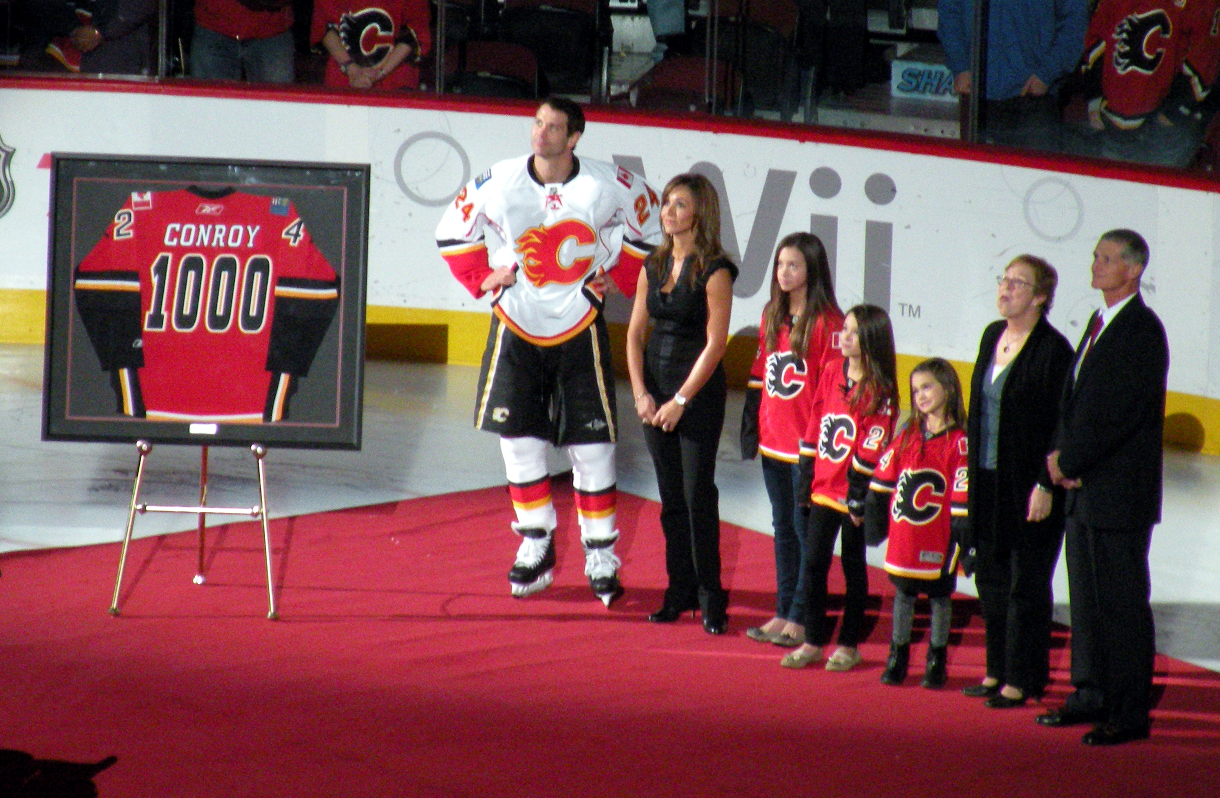
Conroy, pictured with his family, is honored prior to playing his 1,000th career game.

Conroy has a wife, Jessie, and three daughters, Taylor, Sophia and Sydney. Conroy and his family chose to remain in Calgary following his retirement as a player, though they had considered other options including returning to his hometown of Potsdam, New York.

Conroy spends his summers in Henderson Harbor, New York.

Conroy is known for his outgoing and talkative nature, traits that have made him a popular figure with the fans. The Flames honored Conroy with the J. R. "Bud" McCaig Award, given by the organization to individuals that show respect, courtesy and compassion, in 2008–09. He was also named him the winner of the Ralph T. Scurfield Humanitarian Award in 2010 in recognition of his charitable efforts. Additionally, his teammates voted him the organization's nominee for the King Clancy Memorial Trophy which is awarded to the player who best exemplifies leadership and humanitarian contributions to their community. Conroy is the spokesman for the team's charitable organization, the Flames Foundation for Life and routinely participates in team events.

== Career statistics ==
=== Regular season and playoffs ===
			Regular season					Playoffs
Season	Team	League	GP	G	A	Pts	PIM	GP	G	A	Pts	PIM
1989–90	Northwood School	HS-NY	31	33	43	76	—	—	—	—	—	—
1990–91	Clarkson University	ECAC	39	8	22	30	24	—	—	—	—	—
1991–92	Clarkson University	ECAC	32	20	16	36	38	—	—	—	—	—
1992–93	Clarkson University	ECAC	35	10	23	33	26	—	—	—	—	—
1993–94	Clarkson University	ECAC	34	26	39	65	48	—	—	—	—	—
1994–95	Fredericton Canadiens	AHL	55	26	18	44	29	11	7	3	10	6
1994–95	Montreal Canadiens	NHL	6	1	0	1	0	—	—	—	—	—
1995–96	Fredericton Canadiens	AHL	67	31	38	69	65	10	5	7	12	6
1995–96	Montreal Canadiens	NHL	7	0	0	0	2	—	—	—	—	—
1996–97	Fredericton Canadiens	AHL	9	10	6	16	10	—	—	—	—	—
1996–97	Worcester IceCats	AHL	5	5	6	11	2	—	—	—	—	—
1996–97	St. Louis Blues	NHL	61	6	11	17	43	6	0	0	0	8
1997–98	St. Louis Blues	NHL	81	14	29	43	46	10	1	2	3	8
1998–99	St. Louis Blues	NHL	69	14	25	39	38	13	2	1	3	6
1999–00	St. Louis Blues	NHL	79	12	15	27	36	7	0	2	2	2
2000–01	St. Louis Blues	NHL	69	11	14	25	46	—	—	—	—	—
2000–01	Calgary Flames	NHL	14	3	4	7	14	—	—	—	—	—
2001–02	Calgary Flames	NHL	81	27	48	75	32	—	—	—	—	—
2002–03	Calgary Flames	NHL	79	22	37	59	36	—	—	—	—	—
2003–04	Calgary Flames	NHL	63	8	39	47	44	26	6	11	17	12
2005–06	Los Angeles Kings	NHL	78	22	44	66	78	—	—	—	—	—
2006–07	Los Angeles Kings	NHL	52	5	11	16	38	—	—	—	—	—
2006–07	Calgary Flames	NHL	28	8	13	21	18	6	1	1	2	8
2007–08	Calgary Flames	NHL	79	12	22	34	71	7	0	2	2	8
2008–09	Calgary Flames	NHL	82	12	36	48	28	6	0	1	1	0
2009–10	Calgary Flames	NHL	63	3	12	15	25	—	—	—	—	—
2010–11	Calgary Flames	NHL	18	2	0	2	8	—	—	—	—	—
NHL totals			1,009	182	360	542	603	81	10	20	30	52

=== International ===
Year	Team	Comp	GP	G	A	Pts	PIM
2004	United States	WCH	2	0	0	0	0
2006	United States	OG	6	1	4	5	2
International totals			8	1	4	5	2

== Awards and honors ==
Award	Year
University
All-ECAC Hockey Rookie Team	1990–91
All-ECAC Hockey First Team	1993–94
AHCA East First-Team All-American	1993–94
ECAC Hockey All-Tournament Team	1994
NCAA Final Four All-Tournament Team	1993–94
Calgary Flames team awards
J. R. "Bud" McCaig Award	2008–09
Ralph T. Scurfield Humanitarian Award	2009–10

Sporting positions
Preceded by Dave Lowry	Calgary Flames captain 2002–03 with Bob Boughner, 2002	Succeeded by Jarome Iginla
Preceded by Don Maloney (Interim)	General Manager of the Calgary Flames; 2023–present	Incumbent
