= Bob Nightengale =

American sports journalist (born 1970)

- Born: Robert Michael Nightengale; 1956 or 1957 (age 69–70)
- Occupation: Sports journalist
- Years active: 1978–present
- Employer: USA Today

Bob Nightengale is an American journalist who currently is a Major League Baseball insider and columnist for USA Today. He formerly worked for The Arizona Republic, The Kansas City Star, and the Los Angeles Times. He is the incumbent chairman of the Arizona chapter of the Baseball Writers' Association of America.

== Early life ==
Nightengale was raised in the Albuquerque, New Mexico area. He began playing baseball at 4 years old. When Nightengale was 14 years old, he was in a contest to become a batboy for the Albuquerque Dodgers.

== Career ==
Nightengale began writing for The Arizona Republic in November 1978, covering Phoenix-area high school sports. In September 1984, he joined The Kansas City Star to cover professional sports, serving as a beat writer for the Kansas City Kings of the National Basketball Association. His time as a Kings beat writer was short-lived as the team departed for Sacramento, California in 1985. Nightengale reported on the franchise's departure, including team owner Gregg Lukenbill's denial that the team was moving despite signs that they were. Following the departure of the Kings, Nightengale was assigned to cover the Kansas City Royals of Major League Baseball.

In June 1989, Nightengale was hired by the Los Angeles Times to cover the San Diego Padres. During his time at the newspaper, he worked alongside baseball journalism contemporary Bill Plaschke. On May 29, 1997, the Times fired Nightengale. He sued the newspaper later that year for the firing, claiming that they fired him due his criticism of the Dodgers organization's relations with the black community, including an April 1997 article that highlighted the lack of black players on the Dodgers roster relative to other teams at the time as well as the 1940s Dodgers teams that broke baseball's color barrier. The lawsuit alleged that people within the Dodgers organization, including team owner Peter O'Malley, pressured the newspaper into firing Nightengale. Nightengale also claimed that Times sports editor Bill Dwyre told him that the articles were "too harsh" and that Nightengale was "too close to the subject" because of his marriage to a black woman. The Times stated that Nightengale was fired for doing freelance work with Sports Illustrated, but Nightengale said the claim was "pretextual."

In 1998, Nightengale was hired to cover league-wide MLB news at USA Today. He became an insider, often breaking stories about various players and teams. In May 2009, he joined Twitter and has since used the platform to break league news, mostly transactions. On February 4, 2021, Nightengale tweeted that Trevor Bauer would sign a deal with the New York Mets, a news-break that later proved to be false when Bauer signed with the Los Angeles Dodgers. Nightengale later revealed that Bauer's representatives had told him that there was a deal in place with the Mets and that they had even disclosed contract details of the supposed agreement.

In August 2021, Nightengale was criticized after urging his Twitter followers to "find" a Rockies fan who had been falsely accused of shouting a racial slur and called for the fan's imprisonment. Nightengale later deleted the tweets and apologized after an investigation found that the fan was trying to get the attention of the Rockies mascot Dinger for his grandchildren.

During the 2021–22 Major League Baseball lockout, Nightengale was on the scene at the February negotiations that took place at Roger Dean Stadium in Jupiter, Florida, providing updates and details via Twitter. He received fanfare from online baseball fans for his reporting on the lockout. ESPN insider Jeff Passan commended Nightengale's coverage of the lockout, tweeting "Bob rules."

During the 2023 MLB Winter Meetings, Nightengale reported that the Chicago Cubs organization's hopes of signing free agent Shohei Ohtani had "significantly waned." Afterward, Cubs executive Jed Hoyer confronted Nightengale at the meeting and exchanged "stern words" with him. ESPN reporter Jesse Rogers, who reported on the confrontation between Nightengale and Hoyer, said that he believed the Cubs front office was upset that the news was leaked.

He is also an annual "Baseball Career Conference" speaker for the online sports-career training school Sports Management Worldwide, founded and run by Dr. Lynn Lashbrook.

== Personal life ==
Nightengale is based in Phoenix. His son, Bobby, is currently a Minnesota Twins beat writer.

Nightengale has often been outspoken about race relations in baseball. In a New York Daily News interview, he said that having a black wife and biracial children have shaped his views, particularly instances where his family was subjected to housing discrimination in Vero Beach, Florida.
