= Craig Button =

American ice hockey executive

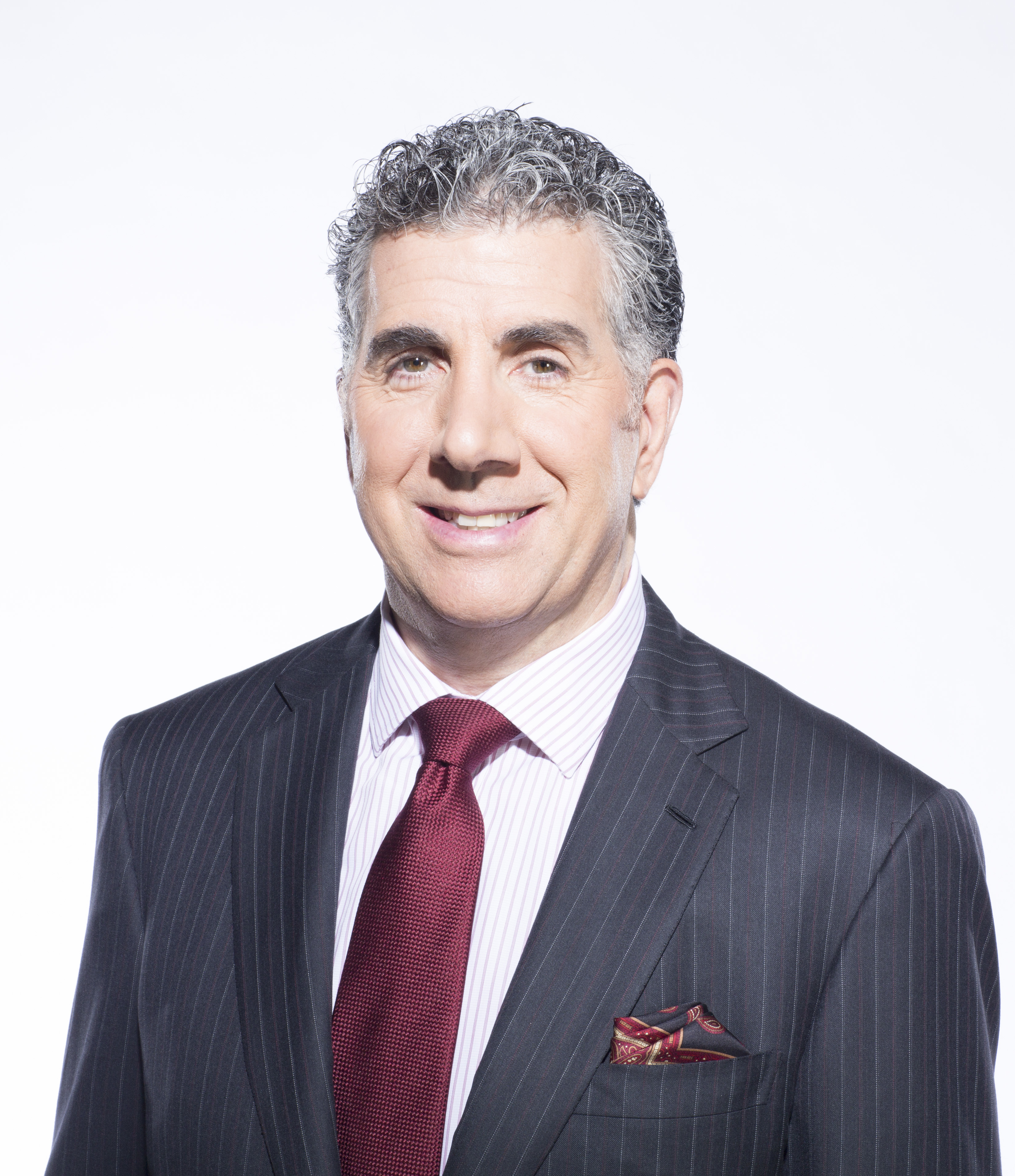
- Born: January 3, 1963 (age 63); Rochester, New York, U.S.
- Occupations: Sportscaster, analyst.
- Known for: Sportscaster on The NHL on TSN, former National Hockey League Executive (General Manager of the Calgary Flames, 2000–2003)

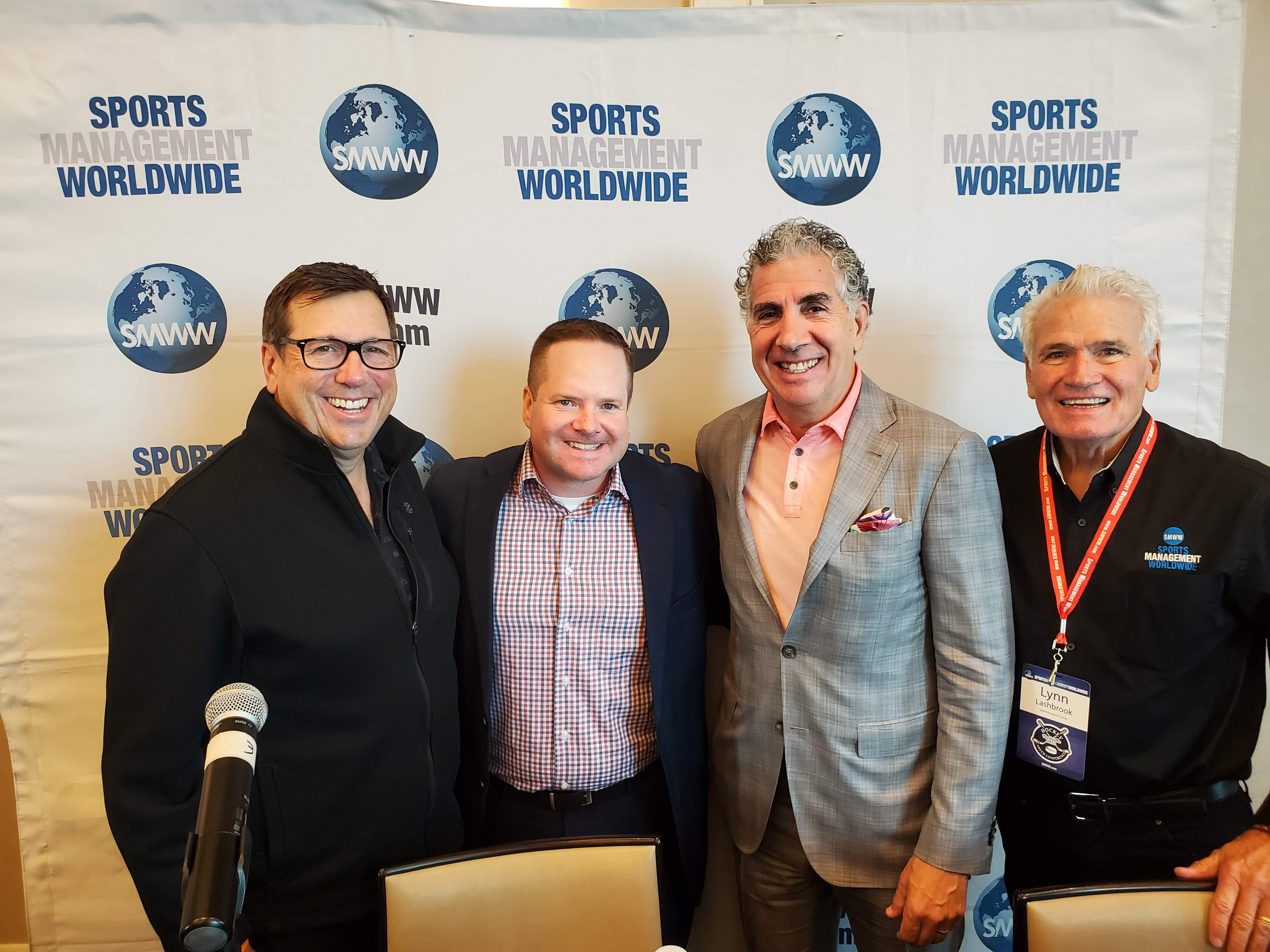
From Left: EJ Hradek, Paul Krotz, Craig Button and Dr. Lynn Lashbrook at the 2023 SMWW Hockey Career Conference in Nashville TN.

Craig J. Button (born January 3, 1963) is currently an ice hockey analyst for TSN and a former National Hockey League (NHL) executive, analyst.

== Early life and hockey family ==
Born in Rochester, New York, Button entered the world of hockey at birth. His father, Jack Button, was an executive with the Rochester Americans, and his mother, Bridget, was the secretary to long-time Toronto Maple Leafs' General Manager and Head Coach and Hockey Hall of Fame member George "Punch" Imlach. Jack held executive positions at the American Hockey League before embarking on an extensive career as an NHL executive. Button's brother Tod was an assistant coach with the Washington Capitals and is currently the Director of Scouting with the Calgary Flames. The Button family moved to Montreal in 1975 when Jack was hired by NHL President Clarence Campbell to institute and manage the NHL Central Scouting Bureau. Button served as the head coach of the Israeli Under-18 Junior hockey team. Button graduated from Riverdale High School in Pierrefonds, Quebec in 1980 and obtained his Bachelor of Arts in Economics from Concordia University, Montreal, in 1987.

Craig is an annual speaker at the "SMWW Hockey Career Conference" for the online sports-career training school Sports Management Worldwide, founded and run by Dr. Lynn Lashbrook.

== Career ==
=== Early career with Minnesota North Stars and Dallas Stars ===
Button began his NHL management career in 1988 with the Minnesota North Stars. He was the Director of Scouting for Dallas Stars 1992–98, Director of Player Personnel for Dallas Stars 1998–2000. During this time, Button worked for hockey legends Bobby Clarke and Bob Gainey. While with the Stars, the team participated in two Stanley Cup Finals, winning in 1999, and were recipients of the Presidents' Trophy on two occasions. The list of players drafted during his tenure include Derian Hatcher, Jere Lehtinen, Jamie Langenbrunner, Marty Turco, Jarome Iginla and Brenden Morrow.

=== Calgary Flames ===
He replaced Al Coates as the Vice President and General Manager of the Calgary Flames in 2000.

Button's tenure as Flames general manager produced mixed results. While he was a guiding force for the Flames' primary development team Saint John Flames of the American Hockey League when they captured the Calder Cup championship in 2001, his moves for the Flames roster didn't have the same impact. Future Hall of Famer Martin St. Louis's contract was bought out after he was exposed in the 2000 NHL expansion draft and went undrafted. Button also traded away future Conn Smythe-winning goaltender Jean-Sebastien Giguere on June 10, 2000, to the Mighty Ducks of Anaheim in exchange for a second-round pick. On November 15, 2002, Button traded Marc Savard to the Atlanta Thrashers for Ruslan Zainullin, who never played a game in the NHL.

Button held the GM position until the conclusion of the 2002–03 NHL season, when his contract was not renewed and was replaced with Darryl Sutter, whom he had hired as Head Coach in December 2002. During the 2003–04 NHL season, the Flames made it to the Stanley Cup Final before losing in seven games to the Tampa Bay Lightning.

After his departure from the Flames, Button joined the Toronto Maple Leafs in 2004 as a scout.

=== TSN ===
Button is currently TSN's Director of Scouting. He is also an analyst on TSN's That's Hockey.

Prior to joining TSN, Button was an analyst on the NHL Network show NHL on the Fly.

== Awards and achievements ==
- 1999 Stanley Cup championship (Dallas)

Preceded by Al Coates	General Manager of the Calgary Flames; 2000–03	Succeeded by Darryl Sutter
