= Rick Olczyk =

American ice hockey executive (born 1970)

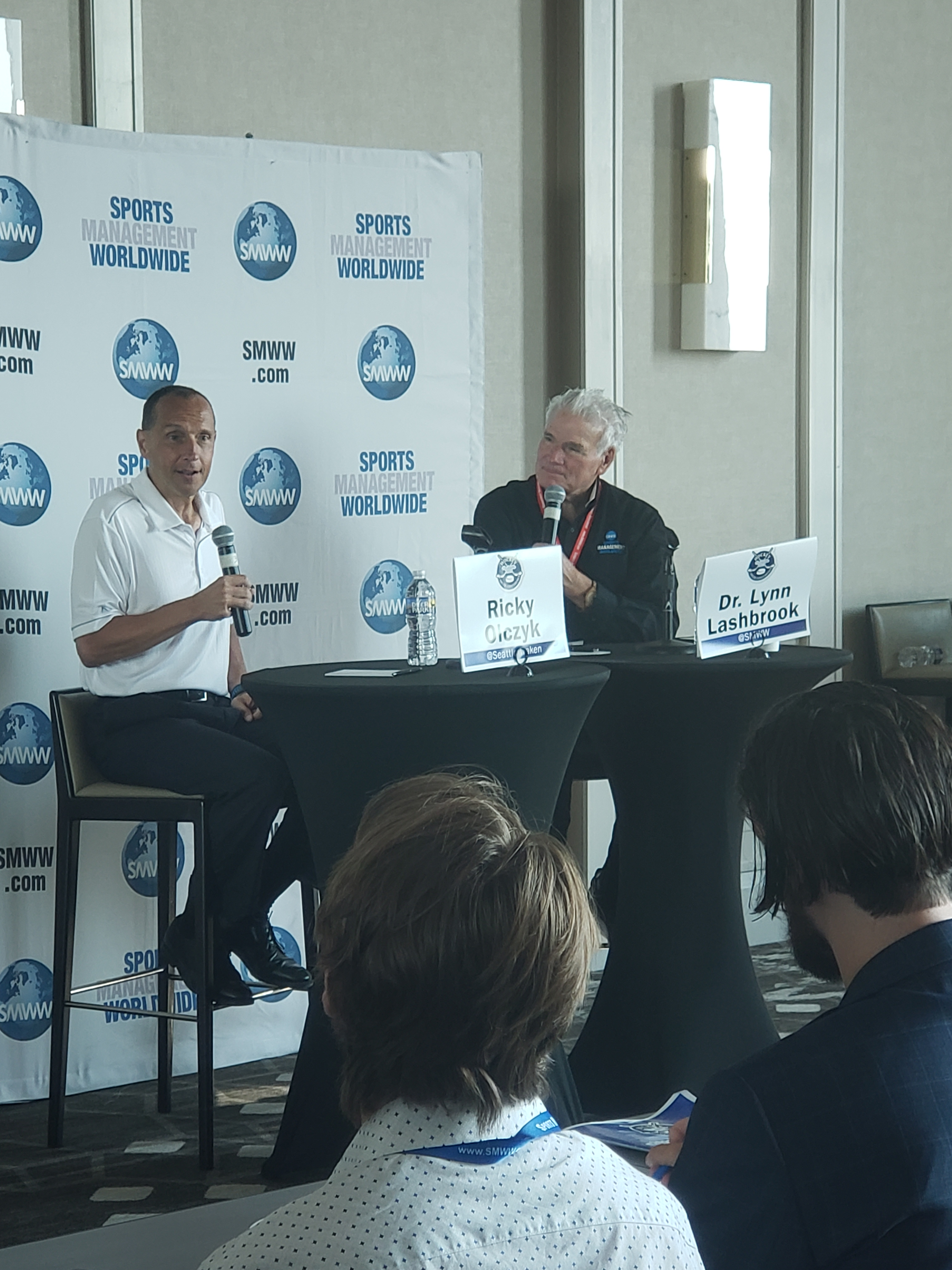
- Olczyk (left) with Lynn Lashbrook (right), 2023
- Born: March 10, 1970 (age 56) Chicago, Illinois, US
- Height: 5 ft 8 in (173 cm)
- Weight: 170 lb (77 kg; 12 st 2 lb)
- Position: Defense
- Played for: Brown University
- NHL draft: Undrafted
- Playing career: 1988–1992

Rick Olczyk (born March 10, 1970) is an American ice hockey executive currently serving as the assistant general manager of the Seattle Kraken. He previously held the same role with the Edmonton Oilers in the NHL for six seasons. He is also the younger brother of former professional hockey player Eddie Olczyk.

He also regularly speaks at the SMWW Hockey Career Conference, hosted by Sports Management Worldwide, an online sports career training organization founded and led by Lynn Lashbrook.

== College career ==
Olczyk graduated from Brown University in 1992 and went on to earn his J.D. degree from Cornell Law School in 1996. While attending Brown, he played four years of NCAA Division I hockey and served as team captain in his senior season. During the 1988–1992 period, he was a key player for the Brown Bears and was honored with a spot on the 1991–92 Academic All-Ivy Team. Earlier in his career, Olczyk also captained the U.S. Under-17 National Team, which earned a silver medal at the 1986 World Cup.

== Edmonton Oilers ==
Olczyk spent six seasons as the assistant general manager of the Edmonton Oilers before transitioning to a new role with the Hurricanes. His tenure with the Oilers began in 2007 when he joined the organization's hockey operations department as the director of hockey administration and legal affairs. In this position, he was responsible for managing the team's legal and administrative matters and served as the primary liaison between the Oilers and the NHL on all issues concerning the Collective Bargaining Agreement (CBA). His expertise in legal and contract negotiations earned him a promotion on September 11, 2009, to the role of assistant general manager. He held the role until April 21, 2014, when Bill Scott succeeded him in the position.
