= Rick Sund =

American basketball executive (born 1951)

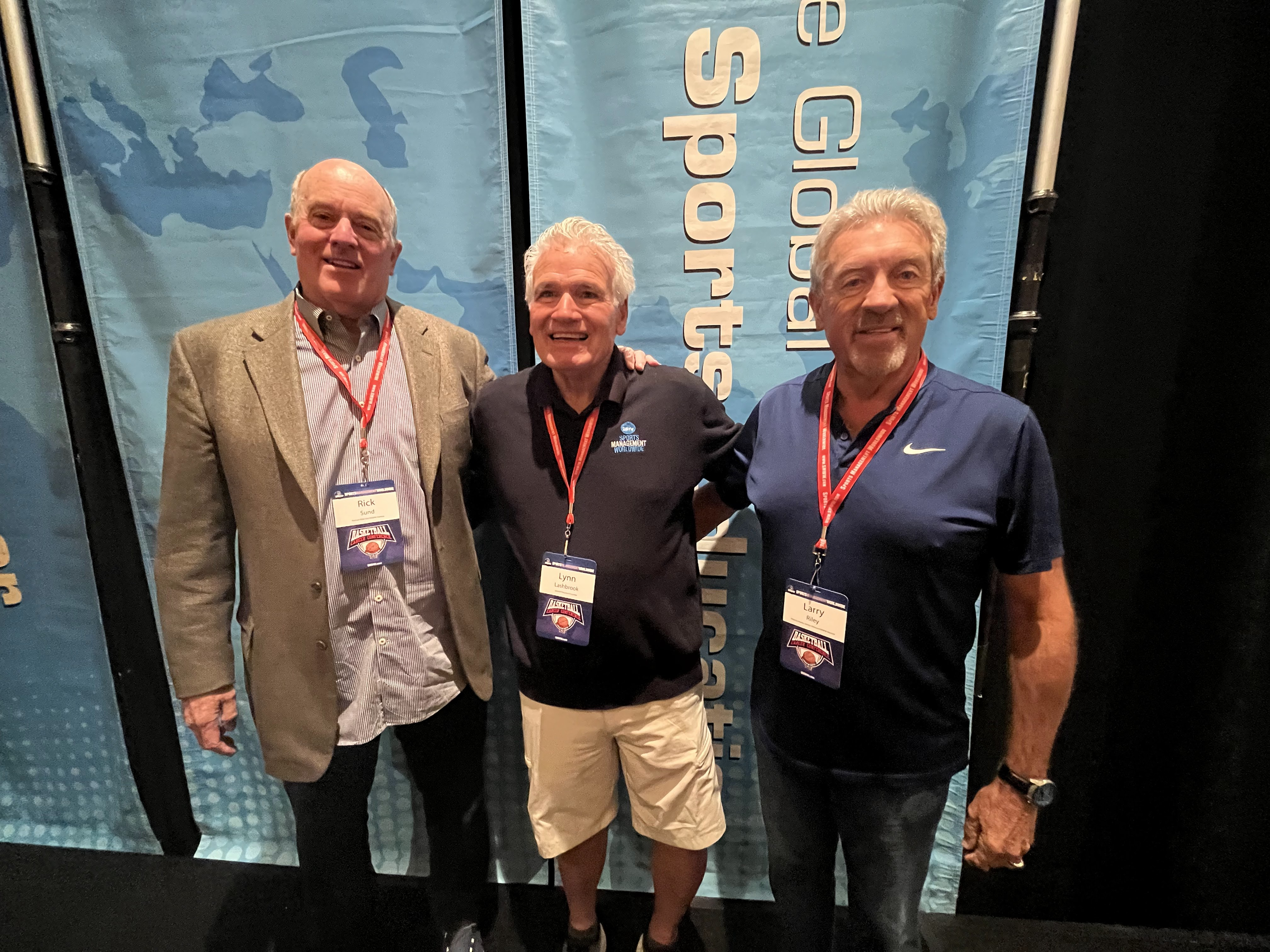
- Rick Sund (Left) with Dr. Lashbrook (Center) and Larry Riley (Right) at the SMWW Basketball Career Conference

Atlanta Hawks
- Position: Senior Advisor of Basketball Operations
- League: NBA

Personal information
- Born: June 4, 1951 (age 75) Elgin, Illinois, U.S.

Career information
- College: Ohio University

Career history
- 1974-1979: Milwaukee Bucks (basketball operations intern)
- 1979-1992: Dallas Mavericks (general manager)
- 1992-1994: Dallas Mavericks (vice-president of basketball operations)
- 1994-1995: Seattle SuperSonics (consultant)
- 1995-1998: Detroit Pistons (vice-president of basketball operations)
- 1998-2000: Detroit Pistons (general manager)
- 2001-2007: Seattle SuperSonics (general manager)
- 2008-2012: Atlanta Hawks (general manager)
- 2012-present: Atlanta Hawks (Senior Advisor of Basketball Operations)

Rick Sund (born June 4, 1951) is a National Basketball Association (NBA) executive with the Atlanta Hawks. Sund also served as GM for the Dallas Mavericks from 1979 to 1992; Detroit Pistons from 1998 to 2000; Seattle SuperSonics from 2001 to 2007 and Atlanta Hawks from 2008 to 2012.

Currently Sund is a "Basketball GM and Scouting" instructor for the online sports-career training school Sports Management Worldwide, founded and run by Dr. Lynn Lashbrook. He also speaks annually at the "SMWW Basketball Career Conference"

== Early managerial career ==
Sund began his managerial career in 1974 with the Milwaukee Bucks after graduating from Ohio University with a degree in sports administration. Sund holds a bachelor's degree in political science from Northwestern University where he was a two-sport athlete, twice named academic All-Big Ten on the basketball squad, while also seeing action as a tight end and wide receiver on the football team. At Northwestern, he joined Delta Upsilon fraternity.

The expansion Dallas Mavericks hired him in 1979 at 28 years of age, making him the youngest general manager in the NBA's history. He helped assemble the first ever Mavericks roster, and for the remainder of his multiple-year tenure around the organization, brought in Brad Davis, Rolando Blackman, Mark Aguirre and others. His 1986-87 Mavericks won a then-franchise record 55 games and took home the Midwest division crown. They reached the Western Conference Finals the next year, but fell to the Los Angeles Lakers in seven games.

He aided the then-rookie general manager of the former Seattle SuperSonics, Wally Walker in 1994.

He moved on to the Detroit Pistons in 1995-96, a roller coaster five seasons at the helm of a talented team holding a young Grant Hill. They made the playoffs four of six seasons Sund ran the front office. One of the most notable trades during his tenure was the 1997 deal of Otis Thorpe to the Vancouver Grizzlies for a protected future 1st round pick. This pick eventually became unprotected in 2003 and netted the 2nd pick in the draft, by which new GM Joe Dumars selected Darko Milicic, widely considered the biggest bust in NBA history.

Sund then left for the Seattle SuperSonics, running the team for six seasons. During his tenure, Sund traded for Ray Allen (using franchise figure Gary Payton), drafted talented young players such as Nick Collison, and built his Sonics around Allen and fellow sharpshooter Rashard Lewis. In spite of this, the SuperSonics only made the playoffs twice during Sund's six seasons as general manager.

== Managerial career with the Atlanta Hawks ==
After his firing, Sund was hired by the Hawks, who had fired Billy Knight.

Prior to the 2008–2009 season's start, sixth man Josh Childress left for Europe after not receiving an offer higher than his restricted free agent qualifying offer. Sund acquired Maurice Evans and Ronald "Flip" Murray to fill Childress' vacancy. While Evans was overpaid (three years at $2.5 million per year), Murray did serve as a great sixth man in his one season with the Hawks, averaging 12.2 PPG on .447 FG% from 2008 to 2009, while being paid $1.5 million. The Hawks clinched the fourth seed in the Eastern Conference during the 2008–09 season, edged the Miami Heat in the first round of the playoffs in seven games after falling behind 2–1, and then were swept by the Cleveland Cavaliers in the second round.

Over the summer 2009, Sund's Hawks made some more moves. They drafted Jeff Teague and Sergiy Gladyr. Gladyr played for the Hawks in the NBA Summer League in 2010 and 2013, but never made an NBA roster. He also re-signed free agents Mike Bibby (three years, roughly $6 million per year), Zaza Pachulia, and Marvin Williams (five years at about $7.5 million per year). Then, Sund acquired Jamal Crawford via trade for Speedy Claxton and Acie Law, and Crawford went on to become the NBA Sixth Man of the Year, averaging 18.0 PPG on .449 FG% in the 2009–2010 season. He also signed free agents Joe Smith and Jason Collins, neither of whom made significant contributions in the 2009–2010 season. The Hawks won 53 games that season, clinched the third seed behind the Orlando Magic, and edged the Milwaukee Bucks in seven games after falling behind 3–2. In the second round, the Magic swept the Hawks in the most lopsided playoff series in NBA history. Joe Johnson made a comment following one of the losses that he didn't care if Hawks fans showed up.

Over the summer of 2010, Sund signed Joe Johnson to a six-year, $119 million contract. That summer he also did not re-sign Mike Woodson as head coach, but instead of hiring a coach and changing the Hawks mediocre culture, he promoted Woodson's head assistant Larry Drew (three years, about $1.25 million per year). However, he also extended Al Horford for five seasons at $12 million per season, and drafted Jordan Crawford. Instead of using the Hawks' 31st overall pick, Sund sold it for cash. Sund also re-signed Jason Collins. During the 2010–2011 season, the Hawks continued to start Bibby over Teague, played Jordan Craword very little, and won 44 games despite few injuries. Just before the trade deadline, Sund traded the prospect Jordan Crawford, the Hawks' future first-round pick in the 2011 draft, and dumped Bibby and Evans's salaries all to the Washington Wizards for Kirk Hinrich and Hilton Armstrong in return. The Hawks however did upset the Orlando magic in six games as the #5 seed in the 2011 playoffs, and played competitive for a while against the top-seeded Bulls in the second round (winning game 1 and almost game 2, only to lose game 3 badly, win a close game 4, and lose 5 and 6 badly). Jason Collins proved to be useful against Dwight Howard on defense, but not against the Bulls.

In the summer of 2011, the Hawks only draft pick, in the second round, was used on Keith Benson, who didn't make the team during the December training camp. Jamal Crawford was not re-signed to avoid going into the luxury tax. However, Sund also re-signed Collins, and added Tracy McGrady, Willie Green, Jannero Pargo, Vladimir Radmanović, Jerry Stackhouse, and Eric Dampier, all at veterans minimums. Signing that many veteran minimum contracts pushed the Hawks into the luxury tax, although McGrady, Green, and Pargo had productive seasons. Childress also came back from Greece, and was signed-and-traded to Phoenix for a trade exception (not used) and a second-round draft pick (sold for cash to pay the luxury tax). The Hawks also signed 27-year-old rookie Ivan Johnson, who had a productive season, even finishing as rookie of the month in April. The Hawks won 40 games in the lockout-shortened season despite Horford missing most of the season, and clinched home court and the #5 seed against the #4 division winner Boston Celtics. The Hawks lost in six games.

Since 2012, Sund has been the Hawks senior advisor for basketball operations.

== Sources ==
- Sonics fire coach Hill, remove GM Sund in shakeup

Sporting positions
| Preceded by Billy Knight | Atlanta Hawks General Manager; 2008–2012 | Succeeded by Danny Ferry |
| Preceded by Wally Walker | Seattle SuperSonics General Manager; 2001–2007 | Succeeded by Sam Presti |
| Preceded by Doug Collins | Detroit Pistons General Manager; 1998–2000 | Succeeded by Joe Dumars |
