= List of Anaheim Ducks general managers =

The Anaheim Ducks are a professional ice hockey team based in Anaheim, California, United States. They are members of the Pacific Division of the Western Conference of the National Hockey League (NHL). The team was founded as an expansion franchise in 1993 as the Mighty Ducks of Anaheim. The team has had six general managers.

== Key ==
Key of terms and definitions
Term	Definition
No.	Number of general managers^{[a]}
Ref(s)	References
–	Does not apply

== General managers ==
General managers of the Anaheim Ducks
No.	Name	Tenure	Accomplishments during this term	Ref(s)
1	Jack Ferreira	March 23, 1993 – August 6, 1998	1 playoff appearance	
2	Pierre Gauthier	August 6, 1998 – April 19, 2002	1 playoff appearance	
3	Bryan Murray	May 2, 2002 – June 8, 2004	1 Stanley Cup Finals appearance (2003); 1 conference title and 1 playoff appearance	
4	Al Coates (interim)	June 8, 2004 – June 20, 2005		
5	Brian Burke	June 20, 2005 – November 12, 2008	Won Stanley Cup (2007); 1 conference title, 1 division title, and 3 playoff appearances	
6	Bob Murray	November 12, 2008 – November 10, 2021	Won General Manager of the Year Award (2013–14); 5 division titles and 8 playoff appearances	
7	Jeff Solomon (interim)	November 16, 2021 – February 3, 2022		
8	Pat Verbeek	February 3, 2022 – Present		

== See also ==
- List of NHL general managers

== Notes ==
- ^{a} A running total of the number of general managers of the franchise. Thus any general manager who has two or more separate terms as general manager is only counted once.
