= Pat Verbeek =

Canadian ice hockey player, executive (b. 1964)

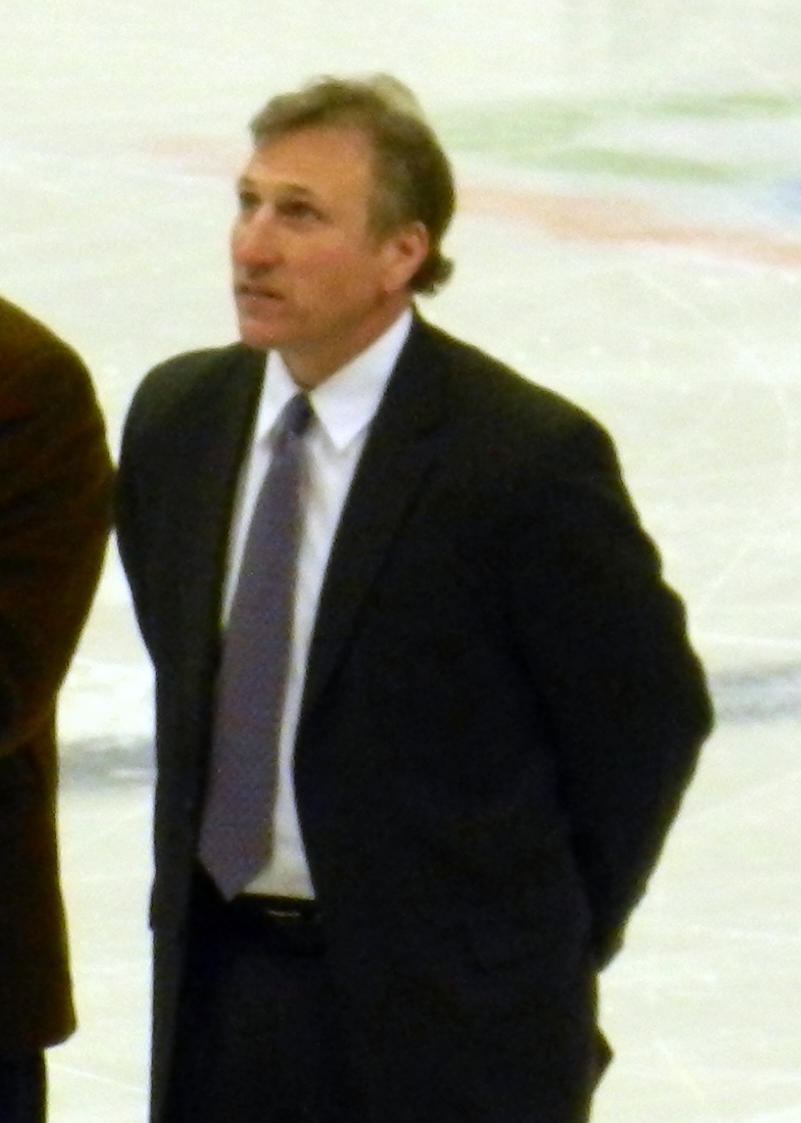
- Verbeek in 2014
- Born: May 24, 1964 (age 62) Sarnia, Ontario, Canada
- Height: 5 ft 9 in (175 cm)
- Weight: 190 lb (86 kg; 13 st 8 lb)
- Position: Right wing
- Shot: Right
- Played for: New Jersey Devils; Hartford Whalers; New York Rangers; Dallas Stars; Detroit Red Wings
- National team: Canada
- NHL draft: 43rd overall, 1982; New Jersey Devils
- Playing career: 1982–2002
Medal record
Representing Canada
World Championships
| Gold medal – first place | 1994 Italy |
| Silver medal – second place | 1989 Sweden |
World Junior Championships
| Bronze medal – third place | 1983 Soviet Union |

Patrick Martin Verbeek (born May 24, 1964) is a Canadian former professional ice hockey player and current general manager of the Anaheim Ducks of the National Hockey League (NHL). From 1982 to 2002, Verbeek played 20 seasons in the NHL for the New Jersey Devils, Hartford Whalers, New York Rangers, Dallas Stars, and Detroit Red Wings as a right winger.

A dependable presence for over 1,400 games, Verbeek is the only player to have recorded three 40-goal seasons with over 200 penalty minutes each. He recorded thirteen 20-goal seasons in his career, which saw him become one of only three players with 500 goals and 2,000 penalty minutes. He won his first and only Stanley Cup as a player in 1999. His nickname, the "Little Ball of Hate", was given to him in 1995 by Glenn Healy after fellow New York Rangers teammate Ray Ferraro was tagged as the "Big Ball of Hate". In 2000, he became the 28th player to score 500 career goals. He is one of four 500-goal players who are eligible but not a member of the Hockey Hall of Fame.

After his playing career ended, he became a broadcaster for the Red Wings before becoming a scout for the team in 2006. He was hired by the Tampa Bay Lightning as director of professional scouting in 2010 and rose to assistant general manager in 2012; he was hired by the Red Wings to serve the same position in 2019. In 2022, he was hired as general manager of the Anaheim Ducks.

== Early life ==
Verbeek grew up in Petrolia, Ontario to a family of farmers, with his father Gerard owning a spread in Wyoming, Ontario that had thousands of acres and pigs. Verbeek played minor hockey before suiting up for the OHA Petrolia Jets Jr.B. club in 1979–80 as a 15-year-old. He was drafted by the Sudbury Wolves of the Ontario Hockey League in 1981. He logged 37 goals and 88 total points on his way to being awarded the Emms Family Award for his rookie play, the first player in franchise history to win the award; his 88 points as a rookie is still a franchise record. He was drafted in the 1982 NHL draft and was invited to training camp but ultimately was sent back to Sudbury to play the 1982–83 season, where he had 107 points in 61 games before being called up.

== Playing career ==
=== New Jersey Devils (1983–1989) ===
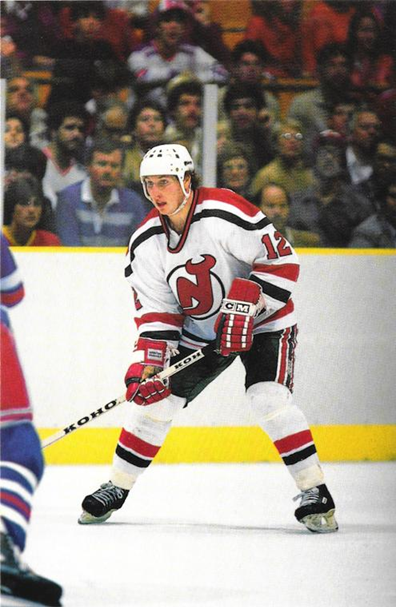
Verbeek with the New Jersey Devils in 1984

Verbeek was selected 43rd overall by the New Jersey Devils in the 1982 NHL entry draft. Verbeek played his first game in the NHL on March 21, 1983, where he recorded two shots on goals and had four penalty minutes. He played in six games to close the year out, which included his first goal and assist on March 24 against the Washington Capitals. He played 79 games for the Devils in the 1983–84 season, where he recorded 20 goals and 27 assists while having 158 penalty minutes.

On May 15, 1985, one of Verbeek's thumbs was cut off by an auger in a farming accident when he tried to snag a piece of paper when loading a corn planting machine. Thanks to his father and brother his thumb was saved, and after extensive rehabilitation, Verbeek returned to hockey.

In his fifth full season, Verbeek peaked in goals with 46 in the 1987–88 season that saw him contribute 31 assists for a then-career high of 77 points as the Devils reached the Stanley Cup playoffs for the first time since moving to New Jersey. His 46 goals were a franchise record for a season until Brian Gionta surpassed him in the final game of the 2005–06 season. In game one of the 1988 Patrick Division Finals on April 18 against the Washington Capitals, Verbeek cut the leg of Capitals defenseman Rod Langway with his left skate that saw Langway get a three by half-inch deep muscle laceration on his left calf. The NHL ruled the incident (which was not called for a penalty) accidental, but the episode added to the Patrick Division rivalry between Washington and New Jersey. In 20 playoff games that saw the Devils lose in the Conference Finals, he recorded four goals and eight assists. In what became his final season with the Devils in the 1988–89 season, he played in 77 games and scored 26 goals with 21 assists and 189 penalty minutes. On June 17, 1989, the Devils traded him to the Hartford Whalers for Sylvain Turgeon; his 170 goals scored with the Devils was a franchise record.

=== Hartford Whalers (1989–1995) ===
In his first season with the Whalers, he played in all 80 games for the first time in his career and recorded 44 goals with 45 assists for a career-high 89 points. It happened to be the first season where he recorded a non-negative plus-minus, recording a +1 while having 228 penalty minutes. In the playoffs that year, he recorded two goals and two assists as the Whalers narrowly lost in the first round. In the 1990-91 season, he made the All-Star team for the first time, which saw him score 43 goals and record 39 assists for 82 points while having a career-high 246 penalty minutes. He was the first player in franchise history to lead a team in goals and penalty minutes in consecutive seasons. Verbeek missed the first three games of the 1991-92 season while holding out when the team did not increase their contract offer above $700,000 when he was seeking over $1 million per year. In the meantime, Verbeek tried out for the Canada Cup and was among the first to be cut. He decided to go through arbitration with the team over his salary for the year; in 76 games, he had 22 goals and 35 assists for 57 points. In October 1992, he signed a three-year $3.3 million contract with the Whalers and was instituted as team captain. He played in all 84 games of the first two seasons as captain, which saw him score over 35 goals each time. He achieved 300 career goals in the middle of the 1992-93 season, and his talents for persevering in taking hits (with a frame of 5'9 and 190 pounds) on his way to getting shots on goal was noted at the time, with Verbeek noting, “I’m not a natural goal scorer, no. I think I’ve had to work for goals. In order to score goals sometimes, you’ve got to go where you’ve really got to pay the price in order to score them. There’s a lot of whacking and bruising that’s gone on. I’m lucky my body’s been able to take it.”

Verbeek was part of the Canadian roster for the 1994 Men's Ice Hockey World Championships that won the championship over Finland, having previously played on the 1989 team that finished as runner-up. On March 24, 1994, Verbeek was part of a Buffalo nightclub incident that saw him and six others (Chris Pronger, Todd Harkins, Marc Potvin, Mark Janssens, Geoff Sanderson and assistant coach Kevin McCarthy) arrested after a conflict with bouncers led to a fight. Upon league investigation, the altercation was found to be both avoidable but also partly the result of the bouncers, which led to no suspensions, although Whalers team owner Richard Gordon fined the players $500 (the maximum under the collective bargaining agreement). The players pled guilty to trespassing and 20 hours of community service as part of a deal where the prosecutors dropped other charges. The incident reportedly was the start of the conflict between him and head coach Pierre McGuire over whether there had been a curfew that night. When McGuire was fired in May, Verbeek notably called it the best thing that could have happened to the Whalers, stating that teammates had no respect for McGuire, who was mocked by other teams.

=== Last years (1995–2002) ===
In the strike-shortened 1994–95 season, Verbeek, in the last year of his contract that was expected to not re-sign with the Whalers due to his salary demands, was traded on March 23, 1995 to the New York Rangers (then on a losing skid who wanted help in aggression) for Glen Featherstone, Michael Stewart, a 1995 first-round draft pick (used to draft Jean-Sebastien Giguere) and a 1996 4th round draft pick (used to draft Steve Wasylko). In 48 total games, he had 17 goals and 16 assists. In his only full season with the Rangers in the 1995-96 season, he had 41 goals (2nd best on the team) with 41 assists while having a career-best plus-minus of +29 while named to the All-Star Game for the second and last time. He had 19 total points in 21 combined playoff games with the Rangers while recording 32 penalty minutes. In the summer of 1996, with Verbeek as a Group III unrestricted free agent that allowed him to move to another team without compensation and unable to afford paying him nearly $10 million for the next three years, the Rangers allowed him to sign with the Dallas Stars on July 3, 1996.

He had 50-point seasons in each of his first two seasons with the Stars while reaching 1,000 games played in 1996. In the 1998-99 season, he had 17 goals and 17 assists before suffering a sprained knee injury in the April 11 game against the Los Angeles Kings after colliding with defenseman Mattias Norstrom that saw Verbeek knocked out for the remainder of the regular season and the entirety of the first round of the Stanley Cup playoffs. Upon his return in game one of the Western Conference Semifinals against the St. Louis Blues, Verbeek scored the first goal of the game but later found himself subject to a one-game suspension after slashing Pierre Turgeon on the knee in the third period. As the Stars made a run to the Stanley Cup Final, Verbeek ultimately played 18 games, scoring three goals and recording four assists, with his final goal being in game five of the Final as the Stars defeated the Buffalo Sabres in six games to win the Stanley Cup for Verbeek's first and only championship. On November 10, 1999, Verbeek signed as a free agent with the Detroit Red Wings. In the game on February 27, 2000, Verbeek tallied an assist on Steve Yzerman's goal against the Tampa Bay Lightning forty seconds into the game to become the 57th player in NHL history with 1,000 career points, which he noted with pride, stating, "I guess if I would've thought about that back when I was a kid trying to make the pros I never thought I'd accomplish this. My parents taught me to never stop working and always work hard. That got me over a lot of hurdles to get here." On March 22 against the Calgary Flames, Verbeek had a two-goal night, with the final one coming off goaltender Fred Brathwaite with 5:22 remaining to tie the game (the game finished in a 2-2 tie) to make Verbeek the 28th player with 500 career goals. Verbeek recorded a total of 22 goals and 26 assists in 68 games with the team. With his 13th and final 20-goal season, Verbeek became one of just 30 players with at least thirteen 20-goal seasons in NHL history. In the 2000-01 season with Detroit, he had 15 goals and 15 assists each in 67 games. He signed as a free agent with the Stars in August 2001 and played in 64 games while recording seven goals and 13 assists. He ended up playing his final game April 1, 2002 against the Columbus Blue Jackets when he "tore the groin muscle off the bone".

After not being signed for the 2002–03 season, on April 22, 2003, Verbeek announced his retirement.

== Legacy ==
Verbeek is the only NHL player to record 40+ goals and 200+ penalty minutes in the same season three times. He recorded thirteen 20-goal seasons, eight times doing so with 30 goals and four times reaching 40 goals. In the timespan of his career, he is one of twelve to have recorded 500 goals and one of 34 with 1,000 points. In 2012, he was inducted into the Connecticut Hockey Hall of Fame.

== Post-playing career ==
After retirement, he became a part-time color analyst for television broadcasts of Red Wings' road games. Verbeek is the only player in NHL history to total over 500 career goals and 2500 career penalty minutes. He left his position as a broadcaster in September 2006, to become a scout for the Red Wings. Verbeek was later recruited by former teammate, Steve Yzerman, to serve as Director of Professional Scouting in June 2010. He was named Assistant General Manager and Director of Player Personnel in 2012. For the 2015 IIHF World Championship, Verbeek served as part of the management staff and served as Director of Player Personnel for Team North America at the 2016 World Cup of Hockey.

On May 6, 2019, Verbeek was named an assistant general manager for the Detroit Red Wings. He added duties of overseeing the AHL team in 2021.

Verbeek was named general manager of the Anaheim Ducks on February 3, 2022. In April 2026, The Athletic anonymously polled player agents asking which front office was hardest to deal with, and the Ducks came in first for the second year in a row. On May 12, Verbeek was named a finalist for the Jim Gregory General Manager of the Year Award.

== Personal life ==
Verbeek and his wife Dianne have five children. One son, Kyle, and four daughters: Stephanie, Kendall, Haley and Georgeanne. The family resided in Birmingham, Michigan during his tenure with the Red Wings, before relocating to Newport Beach, California. Kyle played hockey with the Springfield Jr. Blues of the North American Hockey League and played college hockey at Sacred Heart University. Patrick Kane lived with Verbeek and his family in 2003, after relocating to Detroit, Michigan to play for the Honeybaked 16U AAA hockey club. Kane credited Verbeek as a mentor and even emulated his playing style.

== Awards ==
- Member of one Stanley Cup winning team: 1999 with the Dallas Stars
- Selected to two NHL All-Star Games: 1991 and 1996

== Career statistics ==
=== Regular season and playoffs ===
| | | | Regular season | | | | | Playoffs |
| Season | Team | League | GP | G | A | Pts | PIM | GP | G | A | Pts | PIM |
|---|---|---|---|---|---|---|---|---|---|---|---|---|
| 1979–80 | Petrolia Jets | WOHL | 41 | 17 | 24 | 41 | 85 | — | — | — | — | — |
| 1980–81 | Petrolia Jets | WOHL | 42 | 44 | 44 | 88 | 155 | — | — | — | — | — |
| 1981–82 | Sudbury Wolves | OHL | 66 | 37 | 51 | 88 | 180 | — | — | — | — | — |
| 1982–83 | Sudbury Wolves | OHL | 61 | 40 | 67 | 107 | 184 | — | — | — | — | — |
| 1982–83 | New Jersey Devils | NHL | 6 | 3 | 2 | 5 | 8 | — | — | — | — | — |
| 1983–84 | New Jersey Devils | NHL | 79 | 20 | 27 | 47 | 158 | — | — | — | — | — |
| 1984–85 | New Jersey Devils | NHL | 78 | 15 | 18 | 33 | 162 | — | — | — | — | — |
| 1985–86 | New Jersey Devils | NHL | 76 | 25 | 27 | 53 | 79 | — | — | — | — | — |
| 1986–87 | New Jersey Devils | NHL | 74 | 35 | 24 | 59 | 120 | — | — | — | — | — |
| 1987–88 | New Jersey Devils | NHL | 73 | 46 | 31 | 77 | 227 | 20 | 4 | 8 | 12 | 51 |
| 1988–89 | New Jersey Devils | NHL | 77 | 26 | 21 | 47 | 189 | — | — | — | — | — |
| 1989–90 | Hartford Whalers | NHL | 80 | 44 | 45 | 89 | 228 | 7 | 2 | 2 | 4 | 26 |
| 1990–91 | Hartford Whalers | NHL | 80 | 43 | 39 | 82 | 246 | 6 | 3 | 2 | 5 | 40 |
| 1991–92 | Hartford Whalers | NHL | 76 | 22 | 35 | 57 | 243 | 7 | 0 | 2 | 2 | 12 |
| 1992–93 | Hartford Whalers | NHL | 84 | 39 | 43 | 82 | 197 | — | — | — | — | — |
| 1993–94 | Hartford Whalers | NHL | 84 | 37 | 38 | 75 | 177 | — | — | — | — | — |
| 1994–95 | Hartford Whalers | NHL | 29 | 7 | 11 | 18 | 53 | — | — | — | — | — |
| 1994–95 | New York Rangers | NHL | 19 | 10 | 5 | 15 | 18 | 10 | 4 | 6 | 10 | 20 |
| 1995–96 | New York Rangers | NHL | 69 | 41 | 41 | 82 | 129 | 11 | 3 | 6 | 9 | 12 |
| 1996–97 | Dallas Stars | NHL | 81 | 17 | 36 | 53 | 128 | 7 | 1 | 3 | 4 | 16 |
| 1997–98 | Dallas Stars | NHL | 82 | 31 | 26 | 57 | 170 | 17 | 3 | 2 | 5 | 26 |
| 1998–99 | Dallas Stars | NHL | 78 | 17 | 17 | 34 | 133 | 18 | 3 | 4 | 7 | 14 |
| 1999–2000 | Detroit Red Wings | NHL | 68 | 22 | 26 | 48 | 95 | 9 | 1 | 1 | 2 | 2 |
| 2000–01 | Detroit Red Wings | NHL | 67 | 15 | 15 | 30 | 73 | 5 | 2 | 0 | 2 | 6 |
| 2001–02 | Dallas Stars | NHL | 64 | 7 | 13 | 20 | 72 | — | — | — | — | — |
| NHL totals | | | 1,424 | 522 | 540 | 1,062 | 2,905 | 117 | 26 | 36 | 62 | 225 |

=== International ===
| Year | Team | Event | Result | GP | G | A | Pts | PIM |
|---|---|---|---|---|---|---|---|---|
| 1983 | Canada | WJC | 3rd place, bronze medalist(s) | 7 | 2 | 2 | 4 | 6 |
| 1989 | Canada | WC | 2nd place, silver medalist(s) | 4 | 0 | 2 | 2 | 2 |
| 1994 | Canada | WC | 1st place, gold medalist(s) | 8 | 1 | 1 | 2 | 4 |
| 1996 | Canada | WCH | 2nd place, silver medalist(s) | 1 | 0 | 0 | 0 | 0 |
| Junior totals | | | | 7 | 2 | 2 | 4 | 6 |
| Senior totals | | | | 13 | 1 | 3 | 4 | 6 |

== See also ==
- Captain (ice hockey)
- List of NHL players with 1,000 points
- List of NHL players with 500 goals
- List of NHL players with 1,000 games played
- List of NHL players with 2,000 career penalty minutes

| Preceded by Randy Ladouceur | Hartford Whalers captain 1992–95 | Succeeded by Brendan Shanahan |
| Preceded by Jeff Solomon; Interim | General manager of the Anaheim Ducks; 2022–present | Incumbent |
