= Dan Evans (baseball) =

American baseball executive and scout (born 1960)

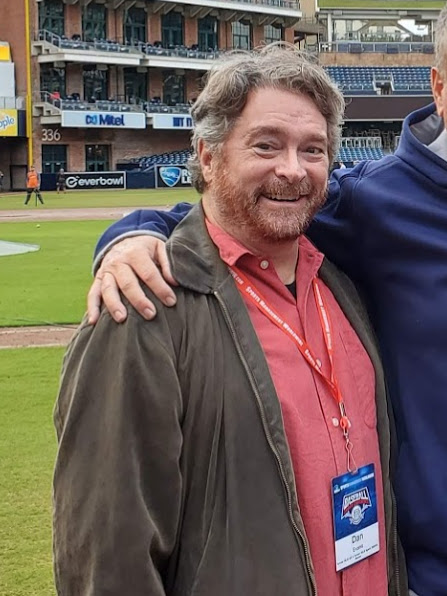
- Evans in 2019 at Petco Park
- Born: January 27, 1960 (age 65); Chicago, Illinois, U.S.
- Occupation: Baseball executive

Daniel P. Evans (born January 27, 1960) is an American professional baseball executive.

Within Major League Baseball, Evans was most recently a scout for the Toronto Blue Jays.

Evans is currently the president-elect of the Society of American Baseball Research (SABR) Board of Directors, with his term set to begin in June 2025. Evans also sits as the President of Baseball Operations for Athelyix Inc.

Additionally, Evans is currently a member of the Baseball Prospectus Advisory Board and a Brand Ambassador for Baseball Reference.

Evans previously served as President of SABR's Rocky Mountain Chapter and as the Chief Operating Officer (COO) of the Field of Dreams movie site.

Evans attended Lane Technical High School on Chicago's North Side and DePaul University.

He started in baseball as an intern with the Chicago White Sox while a junior at DePaul University and was eventually promoted to assistant general manager. After almost 20 years, Evans resigned from the White Sox following the 2000 season. During his tenure, he was responsible for drafting or acquiring future Hall of Famer Frank Thomas, Tom Seaver, Robin Ventura, Paul Konerko, and Bo Jackson, among others. Evans then became the executive vice president and general manager of the Los Angeles Dodgers from 2001 to 2004 during which they ended a seven-year postseason drought. Among the players drafted under Evans were all-stars Matt Kemp and Russell Martin. While Dodgers' GM, Evans promoted the first Taiwanese player, Chin-Feng Chen to the Major Leagues. Evans was later responsible for the Pacific Rim Operations of the Toronto Blue Jays and also scouted Major League and minor league players.

He was Commissioner of the Northern League of Professional Baseball in 2013, which folded before playing games due to the league's ownership issues. Evans authored a column "108 Stitches" for Baseball Prospectus before working for the Blue Jays. In 2013, he also became an instructor for the online sports-career training school Sports Management Worldwide.

Evans' Twitter account, @DanEvans108, was honored as a "Top 100 Must-Follow Sports Business Twitter Account of 2014" by Forbes and has also been named among the "Top 50 Baseball Related Twitter Accounts" by Baseball America.

Evans was born in Chicago, Illinois. He has two daughters and lives in Ankeny, Iowa.

Sporting positions
| Preceded by Dave Wallace | Los Angeles Dodgers General Manager; 2001–2004 | Succeeded by Paul DePodesta |
