= Bob Murray (ice hockey, born 1954) =

Canadian ice hockey player (born 1954)

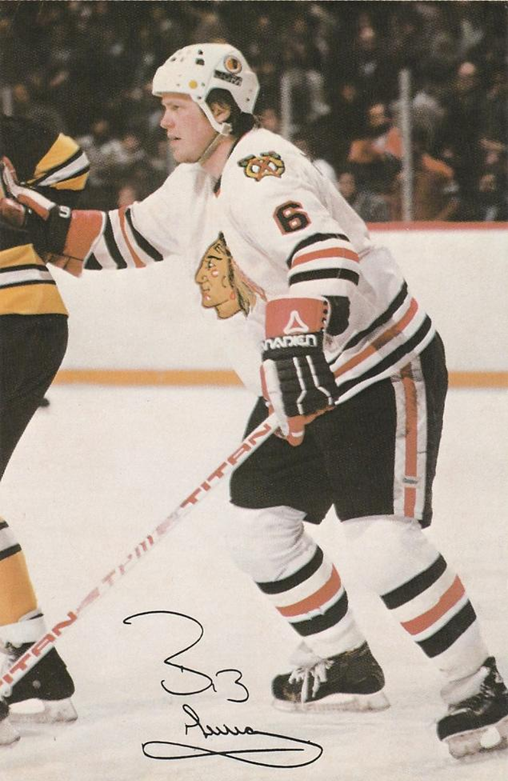
- Born: November 26, 1954 (age 71) Kingston, Ontario, Canada
- Height: 5 ft 10 in (178 cm)
- Weight: 183 lb (83 kg; 13 st 1 lb)
- Position: Defence
- Shot: Right
- Played for: Chicago Black Hawks
- NHL draft: 52nd overall, 1974; Chicago Black Hawks
- WHA draft: 77th overall, 1974; Cincinnati Stingers
- Playing career: 1974–1990

Robert Frederick Murray (born November 26, 1954) is a Canadian professional ice hockey executive and former player. He most recently served as the general manager of the Anaheim Ducks of the National Hockey League (NHL). Murray played in the NHL from 1975 to 1990 as a defenceman with the Chicago Black Hawks. He played in two NHL All-Star Games and helped the Black Hawks reach the NHL playoff semifinals five times in a nine-year stretch. He was the fourth player in franchise history to play 1,000 games with the team. After his playing career, Murray became assistant general manager under Bob Pulford in Chicago. In 1997, he was appointed general manager of the team, where he served until 1999. In 2005, he was hired by the Anaheim Ducks to serve as their senior vice president of hockey operations; Murray won his first ever Stanley Cup when the Ducks were victorious in the 2007 Final. Three years later, he was promoted to general manager. He served as interim coach for 26 games in the 2018–19 season. In twelve full seasons under his management, the Ducks made the playoffs eight times, twice reaching the Conference Final. In 2021, he was put on administrative leave to an investigation by the team over his conduct to players and staff and resigned one day after being put on leave.

== Playing career ==
=== Junior hockey ===
Murray played for the Cornwall Royals of the Quebec Major Junior Hockey League (QMJHL) from 1971 to 1974. He won a Memorial Cup in 1972. After scoring 99 points as a defender in his final junior season, he was drafted 52nd overall by the Black Hawks in the 1974 NHL Amateur Draft.

=== Professional hockey ===
After playing with the Dallas Black Hawks of the Central Hockey League in 1974–75, he joined the Chicago Black Hawks for the 1975–76 season. After developing a leadership role with the team, Murray served as Chicago's interim captain for two months of the 1985–86 season (November 1985 to January 1986) while captain Darryl Sutter was out of the lineup with an injury. Other than starting the 1988–89 season briefly in the IHL, Murray spent 15 consecutive seasons with Chicago, finishing his career with a postseason loss to the Edmonton Oilers on May 12, 1990.

In 1,008 career NHL games, Murray amassed 132 goals and 382 assists. As a member of the Campbell Conference team, he appeared in both the 33rd National Hockey League All-Star Game in February 1981 and the 35th National Hockey League All-Star Game in February 1983.

== Post-playing career ==
The Blackhawks hired Murray as their director of player personnel in 1991, and he became the sixth general manager in Blackhawks' history on July 3, 1997. He served as general manager of the Blackhawks from 1997 to December 1999, when he was fired 22 games into his third season with Chicago in last place in the Central Division. Murray briefly worked as a scouting consultant for the Mighty Ducks of Anaheim before becoming a professional scout for the Vancouver Canucks from 1999 to 2005.

On July 14, 2005, Murray became the Ducks' senior vice president of hockey operations, working with Anaheim general manager Brian Burke and overseeing all aspects of player development. He won the Stanley Cup in this role with the Ducks in 2007.

Murray replaced Burke as the Ducks' general manager on November 12, 2008, when Burke abruptly left the job to become the Toronto Maple Leafs' general manager and president later in the month. The Ducks made the Stanley Cup playoffs in eight of Murray's first 10 seasons in charge, reaching two Western Conference Final and winning five consecutive Pacific Division titles from 2012 to 2017. Murray won the NHL's Jim Gregory General Manager of the Year award for the 2013–14 season after the Ducks finished atop the Western Conference with a franchise-record 116 points.

On February 10, 2019, Murray fired head coach Randy Carlyle for the second time in their Anaheim careers and assumed the head coaching position himself for the final 26 games of the 2018–19 season. Murray returned exclusively to the front office later that summer, hiring Dallas Eakins as the Ducks' new head coach.

On November 9, 2021, Murray was placed on administrative leave by the Anaheim Ducks pending the results of an ongoing investigation. The investigation was reportedly focused on Murray's alleged history of verbal abuse to players and staff members. The following day, November 10, Murray resigned from his position and informed the team he planned to enter treatment for alcohol abuse. He was the third-longest tenured GM in the league at the time he resigned.

Less than five months later, in February 2022, Murray joined the Calgary Flames as a scout. In 2023, he was hired as a senior advisor with the Philadelphia Flyers.

== Career statistics ==
			Regular season					Playoffs
Season	Team	League	GP	G	A	Pts	PIM	GP	G	A	Pts	PIM
1971–72	Cornwall Royals	QMJHL	62	14	49	63	88	16	2	6	8	18
1971–72	Cornwall Royals	M-Cup	—	—	—	—	—	3	1	1	2	6
1972–73	Cornwall Royals	QMJHL	32	9	26	35	34	12	1	21	22	43
1973–74	Cornwall Royals	QMJHL	63	23	76	99	88	5	0	6	6	6
1974–75	Dallas Black Hawks	CHL	75	14	43	57	130	10	2	6	8	13
1975–76	Chicago Black Hawks	NHL	64	1	2	3	44	—	—	—	—	—
1976–77	Chicago Black Hawks	NHL	77	10	11	21	71	2	0	1	1	2
1977–78	Chicago Black Hawks	NHL	70	14	17	31	41	4	1	4	5	2
1978–79	Chicago Black Hawks	NHL	79	19	32	51	38	4	1	0	1	6
1979–80	Chicago Black Hawks	NHL	74	16	34	50	60	7	2	4	6	6
1980–81	Chicago Black Hawks	NHL	77	13	47	60	93	3	0	0	0	2
1981–82	Chicago Black Hawks	NHL	45	8	22	30	48	15	1	6	7	16
1982–83	Chicago Black Hawks	NHL	79	7	32	39	71	13	2	3	5	10
1983–84	Chicago Black Hawks	NHL	78	11	37	48	78	5	3	1	4	6
1984–85	Chicago Black Hawks	NHL	80	5	38	43	56	15	3	6	9	20
1985–86	Chicago Black Hawks	NHL	80	9	29	38	75	3	0	2	2	0
1986–87	Chicago Blackhawks	NHL	79	6	38	44	80	4	1	0	1	4
1987–88	Chicago Blackhawks	NHL	62	6	20	26	44	5	1	3	4	2
1988–89	Saginaw Hawks	IHL	18	3	7	10	14	—	—	—	—	—
1988–89	Chicago Blackhawks	NHL	15	2	4	6	27	16	2	3	5	22
1989–90	Chicago Blackhawks	NHL	49	5	19	24	45	16	2	4	6	8
NHL totals			1,008	132	382	514	871	112	19	37	55	106

== Head coaching record ==
Team	Year	Regular season						Postseason			
Team	Year	G	W	L	OTL	Pts	Finish	W	L	Win%	Result
ANA	2018–19	26	14	11	1	29	6th in Pacific	—	—	—	Missed playoffs
Total		26	14	11	1	29		—	—	—	

== Awards ==
- QMJHL rookie-of-the-year (1972)
- QMJHL first all-star team (1974)
- Played in NHL all-star game (1981, 1983)
- Jim Gregory General Manager of the Year Award (2014)

== See also ==
- List of NHL players with 1,000 games played

Preceded by Darryl Sutter	Chicago Black Hawks captain 1985–86; During injury to Darryl Sutter	Succeeded by Darryl Sutter
Preceded by Bob Pulford	General manager of the Chicago Blackhawks; 1997–1999	Succeeded by Bob Pulford
Preceded by Brian Burke	General manager of the Anaheim Ducks; 2008–2021	Succeeded by Jeff Solomon; Interim
Preceded by Randy Carlyle	Head coach of the Anaheim Ducks (interim); 2019	Succeeded by Dallas Eakins
