= Jen Mueller =

American sports broadcast journalist

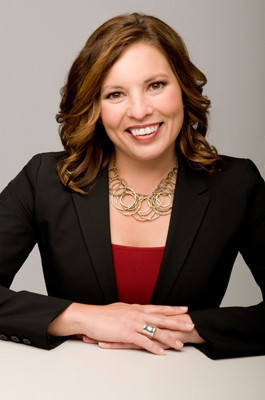
- Mueller in 2011
- Born: Jennifer Mueller; June 28, 1978 (age 48)
- Education: Broadcast Journalism, Public Policy
- Alma mater: Southern Methodist University
- Occupations: Broadcast sports journalist, sports official, business consultant, author
- Employer: Root Sports Northwest
- Website: jenmuellerexperttalker.com

Jen Mueller (born June 28, 1978) is an American television and radio sports broadcast journalist, sports official, business consultant, and author. She is known for appearing on Seattle Mariners television broadcasts for the Root Sports Northwest network, while also appearing as the radio sideline reporter for the Seattle Seahawks football team. When she was a college freshman, she began serving as a flag football official, later becoming the third woman in history to earn All-American honors. She is the founder of Talk Sporty to Me, a professional development organization that introduces sports conversations into the corporate environment.

== Personal background ==
Jennifer Mueller was born on June 28, 1978, and grew up in Houston, Texas. She attended the Southern Methodist University in Dallas, graduating in 2000 with degrees in broadcast journalism and public policy. While she was a college freshman, she began serving as a flag football official. After three years, she earned All-America honors as an official, becoming the third female in the history of the award to be recognized. Following her graduation from college, she began officiating high school sports.

== Professional background ==
=== Broadcast journalism ===
Mueller began her broadcasting career producing Texas Cable News in Dallas, later relocating to Seattle and joining the staff at Northwest Cable News and KING-TV. In fall 2006, she began working as the sideline reporter for Big Sky Conference football with Fox Sports Northwest, later known as Root Sports Northwest.

Seattle Seahawks

In 2009, she joined the Seattle Seahawks football broadcast team, where she works alongside Steve Raible and Dave Wyman. Formerly Warren Moon. She was the first person to interview Seahawks receiver Golden Tate, following his controversial touchdown catch against the Green Bay Packers, during the Seahawks Monday Night Football win on September 25, 2012.

Seattle Mariners

She was a member of the Seattle Mariners broadcast team, where she delivers game reports, while conducting "walk-off" interviews for Mariners All-Access, a weekly magazine-style television program broadcast on Root Sports Northwest. She was the first person to interview Félix Hernández, following his perfect game on August 15, 2012.

In September 2025, Mueller announced that she would be departing the Mariners broadcast team after 19 years of working with the team. Mueller stated that she planned to focus on working with the Seahawks as well as other personal projects.

=== Business consulting ===
In 2009, Mueller established Talk Sporty to Me, which is a professional development organization that introduces the value of sports conversations in the corporate environment, while focusing on the correlation between successful strategic planning and "leveling the playing field" in business relationships. She shows business professionals how to leverage sports conversations and provides tools to raise their personal and professional profile. She is also an annual "NFL Combine Football Career Conference" speaker for the online sports-career training school Sports Management Worldwide.

== Published works ==
In 2013, Mueller released the book GameTime: Learn to Talk Sports in 5 Minutes a Day for Business intended as a resource for new and novice sports fans.
