= List of Calgary Flames general managers =

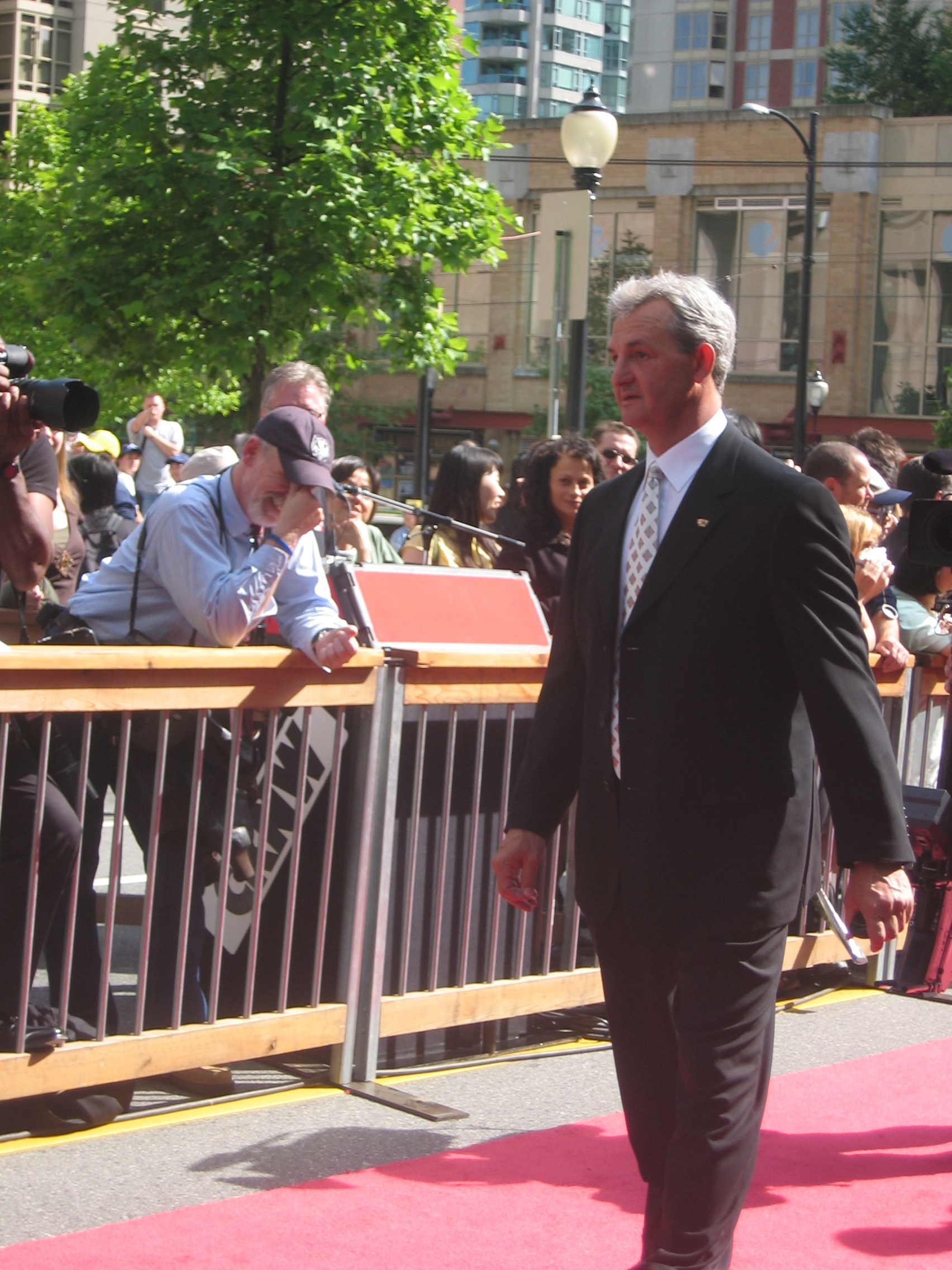
Darryl Sutter stepped down as General Manager of the Flames on December 30, 2010.

The Calgary Flames are a professional ice hockey team based in Calgary, Alberta, Canada. The team is a member of the Pacific Division in the Western Conference of the National Hockey League (NHL). The Flames arrived in Calgary in 1980 after transferring from the city of Atlanta, Georgia, where they were known as the Atlanta Flames from their founding in 1972 until relocation.

There have been nine general managers in Flames' history. The first was Cliff Fletcher, who left his position as the assistant general manager of the St. Louis Blues to become the first general manager of the Atlanta Flames in 1972. Fletcher remained with the Flames through their transfer to Calgary, ultimately holding the position for 19 years until he left to become the president and general manager of the Toronto Maple Leafs in 1991. Fletcher built a team that twice won the Presidents' Trophy as the top performer in the regular season, and won the Stanley Cup in 1989. Fletcher earned the nickname "Trader Cliff" for his willingness to make high-profile deals. He is best remembered for his trades that brought Alberta native Lanny McDonald to Calgary from the Colorado Rockies in 1981, and the acquisition of Doug Gilmour as part of a seven-player deal in 1988. Fletcher was inducted into the Hockey Hall of Fame as a builder in 2004.

Doug Risebrough succeeded Fletcher in 1991 and quickly completed a ten-player deal, the largest in NHL history, with Fletcher's Leafs. The deal sent Gilmour and four players to Toronto, while former 50-goal scorer Gary Leeman came to Calgary with four others. The trade transformed both teams; the Leafs quickly developed into playoff contenders, while Leeman scored only 11 goals in a Flames uniform. Risebrough remained the Flames' general manager until 1995.

Al Coates was named the third general manager in team history in 1995. He held the position for five seasons, during which the Flames qualified for the playoffs only once. Craig Button replaced Coates in 2000, and in three years as general manager failed to qualify for the playoffs. Button was fired following the 2002–03 season and replaced with Darryl Sutter, who was serving as the team's head coach.

In his first year as general manager, Sutter led the Flames to their first playoff appearance in eight seasons in 2003–04. The team also won its first playoff series in 15 years, defeating three division winners en route to a surprise appearance in the 2004 Stanley Cup Final. Sutter led the Flames for eight seasons before stepping down in December 2010. He was replaced with Jay Feaster. Jay Feaster was let go on December 12, 2013, and was succeeded by Brad Treliving on April 28, 2014. Treliving then served as general manager until April 17, 2023, when he and the team mutually agreed to part ways; he was subsequently replaced by assistant general manager Craig Conroy on May 23, 2023.

== General Managers ==
#	Name	Appointment	Departure	Awards and milestones	Notes
1	Cliff Fletcher	January 12, 1972	May 16, 1991	1989 Stanley Cup; Elected to the Hockey Hall of Fame in 2004	
2	Doug Risebrough	May 16, 1991	November 3, 1995		
3	Al Coates	November 3, 1995	April 11, 2000		
4	Craig Button	June 6, 2000	April 11, 2003		
5	Darryl Sutter	April 11, 2003	December 28, 2010		
6	Jay Feaster	December 28, 2010	December 12, 2013		
7	Brian Burke	December 12, 2013	April 28, 2014		President of hockey operations, served as acting general manager
8	Brad Treliving	April 28, 2014	April 17, 2023		
9	Don Maloney	April 17, 2023	May 23, 2023		President of hockey operations, served as interim general manager
10	Craig Conroy	May 23, 2023	Incumbent		
