= Al Coates (ice hockey) =

- Born: December 3, 1945 (age 80); Listowel, Ontario, Canada
- Occupation: Former general manager of the Calgary Flames

Alan Coates (born December 3, 1945) is an executive in the National Hockey League who most recently served as the executive director of 2012 IIHF World Junior Championship.

Coates is a former General Manager of the Calgary Flames, a post he held from November 1995 until the end of the 1999–2000 NHL season. He then was named the Vice President of Hartford Sports and Entertainment for the New York Rangers from 2000 to 2003.

Coates served as interim General Manager of the Anaheim Ducks in 2004–05 before becoming the Senior Advisor to the General Manager. He then served as the Director of Player Personnel for the Toronto Maple Leafs in 2008. He won the Stanley Cup in 1989 with Calgary as Assistant to the President, and in 2007 with Anaheim as Senior Advisor to the General Manager.

Preceded by Doug Risebrough	General Manager of the Calgary Flames; 1995–2000	Succeeded by Craig Button
Preceded by Bryan Murray	General Manager of the Mighty Ducks of Anaheim; 2004–2005	Succeeded by Brian Burke
