= Theresa Feaster =

American ice hockey coach

- Born: 1992 (age 33–34); Hershey, Pennsylvania, U.S.
- Occupation: Director of Hockey Operations
- Organization: Providence College

Theresa Feaster is an American ice hockey coach, currently serving as director of hockey operations and general manager for Providence College in the NCAA and as a video coach for the American U20 national men's team. She is the first female assistant in USA Hockey's history at any major men's championship.

== Career ==
As a child, Feaster helped her father, who was GM of the Calgary Flames and Tampa Bay Lightning, by faxing player contracts or other important hockey paperwork. While studying at Providence, her father introduced her to Nate Leaman at the 2012 NHL Draft. As a result, during her junior year, she became a student volunteer with the Providence hockey team. After Providence won a national title in 2015, Leaman retained Feaster as a graduate assistant for the next two seasons before hiring her full-time in 2016.

Feaster remains one of only two women working as a full-time staffer in NCAA Division I men's hockey. Brittany Miller held a similar role as director of hockey operations at Boston University, while Kelsey Harbison currently works in the same position at the University of Denver. While Feaster manages duties at Providence such as team services, arranging flights, buses, hotels, and meals, her passion is video, leading Leaman to praise her for her ability to break down other teams' strategies and how they win. Feaster points to being around Bob Hartley and John Tortorella as giving her an advantage.

== Personal life ==
Feaster's father, Jay, has served as general manager of both the Flames and Lightning in the National Hockey League. She aspires to one day be the NHL's first female general manager, following in the path of her father.
