= Brian Burke (ice hockey) =

American-Canadian executive (born 1955)

- Hockey Hall of Fame, 2026 (Builder)
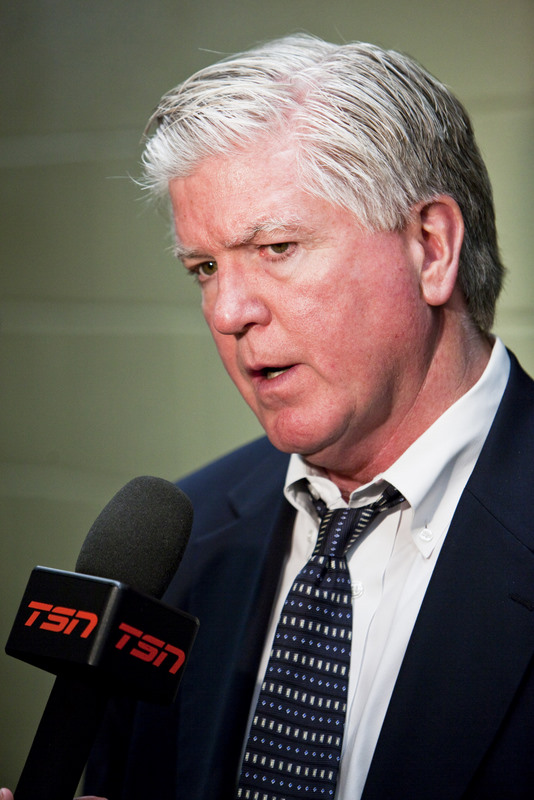
- Burke in 2009
- Born: June 30, 1955 (age 71) Providence, Rhode Island, U.S.
- Education: Providence College (BA); Harvard Law School (JD)
- Occupation: Ice hockey executive
- Years active: 1987–present
- Children: 6, including Brendan

Brian P. Burke (born June 30, 1955) is an American-Canadian ice hockey executive. He served as the first executive director of the Professional Women's Hockey League Players Association (PWHLPA) from July 2023 through June 2025. He previously worked in the NHL league office, including as the director of hockey operations, and worked as general manager of the Hartford Whalers, Vancouver Canucks, Anaheim Ducks—with whom he won the Stanley Cup in 2007—and Toronto Maple Leafs, as well as president of hockey operations for the Leafs, Calgary Flames, and Pittsburgh Penguins. Burke was general manager for the silver-medalist United States national team for the 2010 Winter Olympics in Vancouver. He is a member of Rugby Canada's board of directors. Burke was inducted into the Rhode Island Hockey Hall of Fame in 2019. He was inducted into the Hockey Hall of Fame in 2026 in the Builder category.

== Early life and playing career ==
Born in Providence, Rhode Island, and raised in Edina, Minnesota, in a family of ten children. Burke graduated from Edina High School followed by Providence College in 1977 with a Bachelor of Arts degree in history. While attending Providence, he played for the Friars Division-I ice hockey team, where, during his senior year, he served as captain under coach Lou Lamoriello. He was also a teammate of Ron Wilson's there.

In 1977, Burke played seven games with the Springfield Indians of the American Hockey League (AHL). He then signed with the Philadelphia Flyers in the off-season and proceeded to play one full year in the AHL with the Maine Mariners, winning a Calder Cup championship that year. After one year in the AHL, Burke attended Harvard Law School, where he graduated with a Juris Doctor in 1981. After graduating, Burke became an NHL player agent.

== Executive career ==
=== Early career ===
In 1987, he was hired by Pat Quinn to be the director of hockey operations for the Vancouver Canucks. In the 1992–93 season, he left that job to become general manager of the Hartford Whalers. Burke stepped down after one year in Hartford, so he could join the NHL front office as executive vice president and director of hockey operations, under league commissioner Gary Bettman. In that role, he served as the league's chief disciplinarian.

=== Vancouver Canucks ===
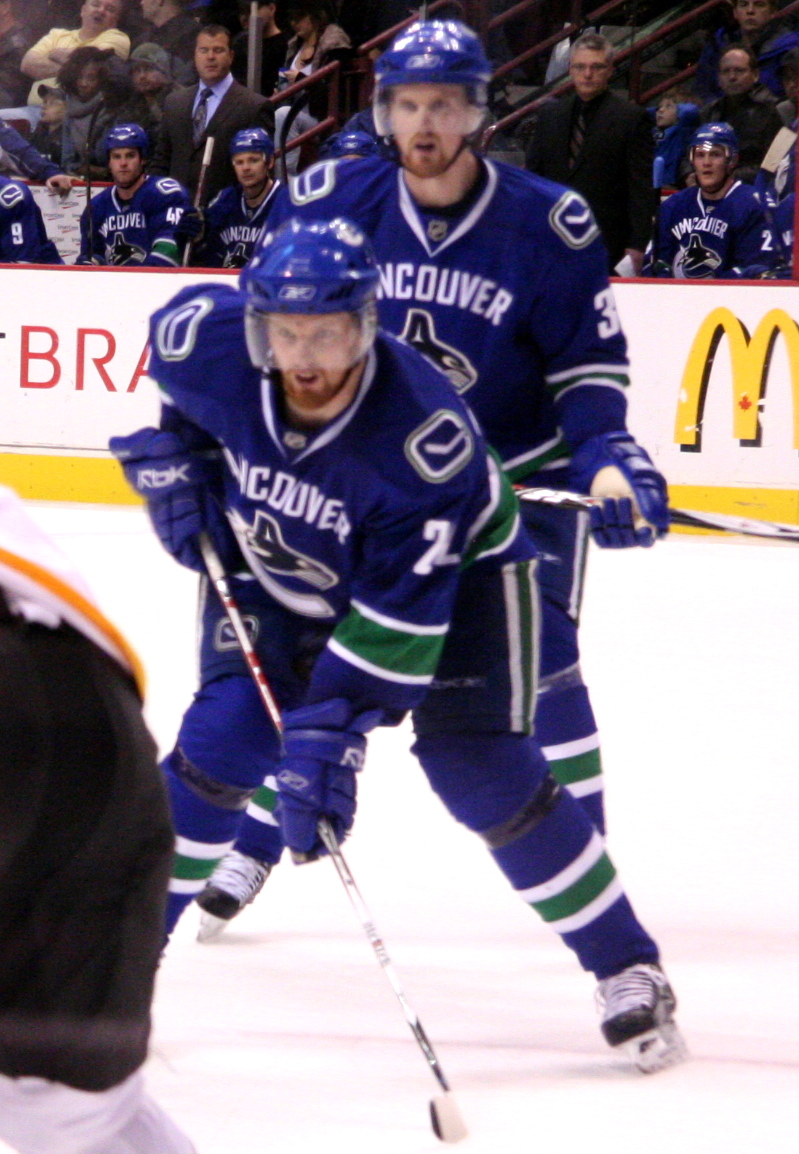
The Sedins with the Vancouver Canucks. Burke drafted both players in the first round of the 1999 NHL entry draft as the general manager of the Canucks.

In 1998, he became general manager of the Vancouver Canucks. With the Canucks, he was credited with reviving the ailing franchise and increasing attendance, with the drafting and signing of several key players such as Daniel Sedin, Henrik Sedin and Ryan Kesler, as the team won a playoff series and captured a division title. Following the 2003–04 NHL season, Canucks ownership chose not to renew Burke's contract for the GM position. Burke then briefly worked as an analyst for NHL games on both CBC and TSN. Burke's total record with the Canucks was 219-181-68-24.

=== Anaheim Ducks ===
As the 2004-05 NHL Lockout was coming to a close, Burke was announced as the next GM of the Anaheim Ducks. In his first year with the club, the Ducks made it all the way to the third round before falling to the Edmonton Oilers in the Western Conference Final. The following year, Burke won the Stanley Cup with the Anaheim Ducks in the 2006–07 NHL season. Burke stepped down as GM of the Anaheim Ducks on November 12, 2008. The Ducks management submitted papers to the NHL, releasing him from contractual commitment.

=== Toronto Maple Leafs ===
On November 29, 2008, Burke was introduced as the president and general manager of the Toronto Maple Leafs, replacing interim general manager Cliff Fletcher. He became the 13th non-interim general manager of the club and the first to be American-born. He reportedly agreed to a six-year deal worth $3 million annually. Soon thereafter, on December 4, 2008, Burke offered Dave Nonis the position of senior vice president and director of hockey operations for the Maple Leafs; Nonis accepted, marking the third time he has held this post under Burke; he had done so previously in Anaheim and Vancouver.

Burke attended the World Hockey Summit hosted in Toronto in 2010, and wanted NHL participation in the Winter Olympics to continue, but felt that teams should receive financial compensation while the NHL season was on hiatus during the Olympics. He proposed allowing the NHL oversee a world championship which had potential to a financially lucrative venture while league games were not being played.

On January 9, 2013, Burke was fired by the Leafs as president and general manager and given a role as senior advisor to MLSE's president and C.O.O. Tom Anselmi and the MLSE board of directors. The advisory role would not relate to hockey matters. Burke was fired principally by team director George A. Cope, who campaigned for the team's new ownership to make a change in team leadership. During Burke's tenure with the Leafs from November 2008 to January 2013, the team consistently failed to make the post-season and remained the only team in the League unable to do so following the 2004 lockout. With the Leafs, Burke amassed a record of 129-135-42.

==== Criticism ====
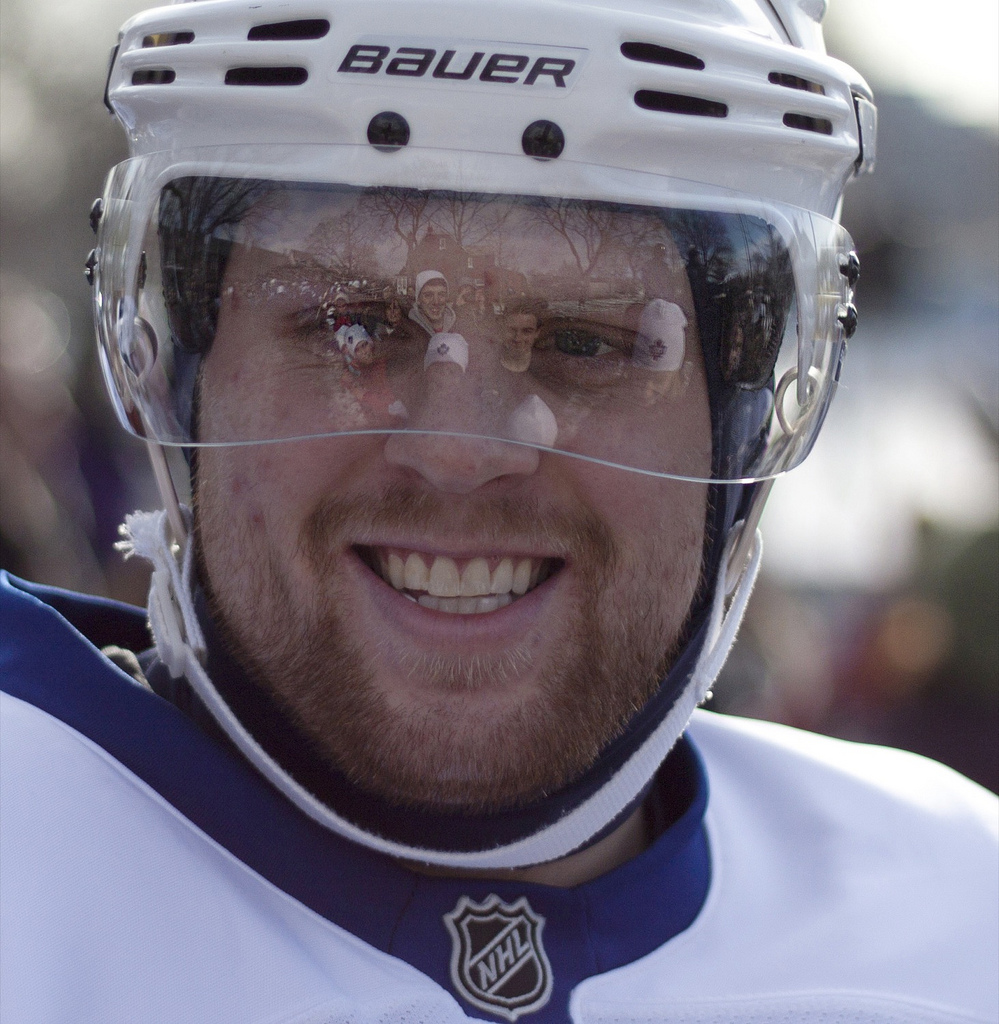
Phil Kessel with the Toronto Maple Leafs. Kessel was acquired by the Leafs as a result of a controversial trade by Burke in 2009.

During his time in Toronto, Burke was notably criticized for a controversial trade in 2009 with Boston, when he acquired sniper Phil Kessel for two first-round draft picks and a second-round selection. The Bruins used the picks to select star forward Tyler Seguin, Dougie Hamilton and Jared Knight.

In December 2011, Burke drew criticism in the media for his mid-season extension of head coach Ron Wilson, a longtime friend. "Burke and Wilson were born a month apart, were college roommates and teammates on the Providence College Friars hockey team in Rhode Island in the 1970s and have been friends ever since. Despite Wilson's three consecutive losing seasons, Burke renewed Wilson's contract with a $2 million extension. News of the contract broke on social media site Twitter, where Wilson posted that "This Xmas could be better if Santa stuffs a certain piece of paper in my stocking" and "'He came! He came!' [...] I got a new Red Ryder BB gun and a contract extension!", to which Burke replied, "Congratulations to Ron Wilson on his contract extension! Merry Christmas Ron!" Later, Burke defended his decision in the media, stating "This is a coach who's earned this, a coach who's earned this extension," and "It's not charity. It's not a gift." However, Wilson was released with full pay three months later following mounting losses and jeers from fans. "Every coach has a shelf life," Burke said. "After the last home game, it would be cruel and unusual punishment to let Ron coach another game in the Air Canada Centre."

=== Western Hockey League ===
Burke, together with Glen Sather and Darryl Porter owned the Tri-City Americans of the WHL until 2005 when the team was sold in order to prevent the team from moving. Sather, Burke, and Porter along with Moray Keith and Jim Bond who held a minority stake, were granted a WHL expansion team starting in the 2006-2007 season in Chilliwack, British Columbia which became the Chilliwack Bruins. The team was owned by this group until 2011, when the team was sold and became the Victoria Royals.

=== Calgary Flames ===
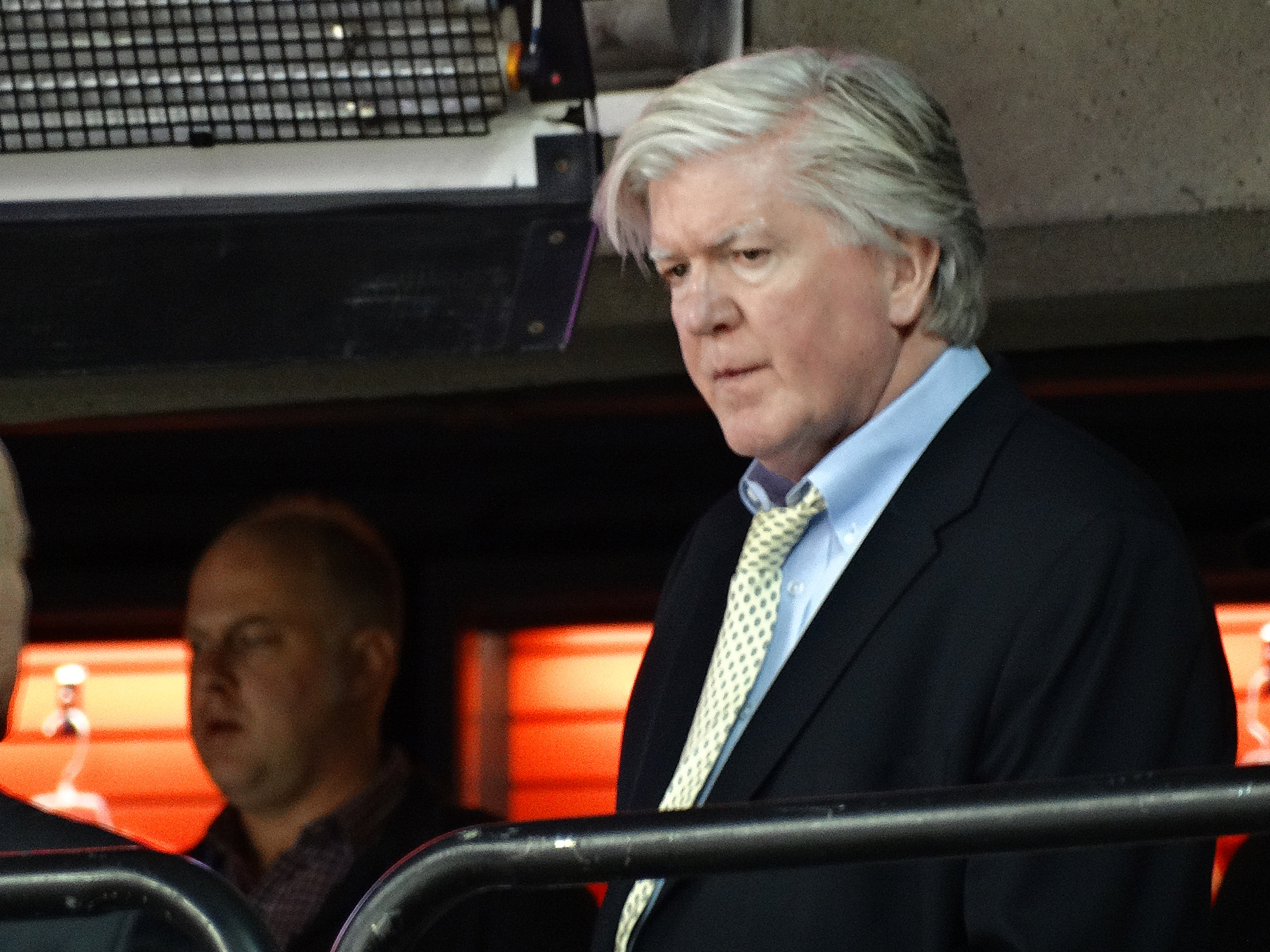
Burke attending a CHL/NHL Top Prospects Game in 2014.

On September 5, 2013, Burke was named the president of hockey operations for the Calgary Flames. After firing Jay Feaster and John Weisbrod, Burke assumed the role of acting general manager during the search for a permanent GM. On April 28, 2014, Burke hired Brad Treliving as the GM of the Calgary Flames.

After nearly five years on the job, Burke stepped back from his role as president of the Flames' hockey operations on April 27, 2018.

=== Pittsburgh Penguins ===
On February 9, 2021, Burke was hired as the president of hockey operations for the Pittsburgh Penguins. On April 14, 2023, the Penguins announced that they had fired Burke after missing the playoffs for the first time since 2005–06, ending a 16 year playoff appearance streak for the organization.

=== PWHLPA ===
On August 29, 2023, Burke was named as the executive director of the Professional Women’s Hockey League Players Association, the player union for the newly formed Professional Women's Hockey League (PWHL). At the inaugural PWHL draft on September 18, Burke stated it was "the biggest day in the history of women's hockey", and he went on to explain his optimism about the new league: "For the first time, we've got one united league. Properly funded, properly staffed, properly backed up. It's the best chance women have had." He served in the position until June 2025.

== Broadcasting career ==
Following his departure from the Calgary Flames, Burke joined Rogers Media as an ice hockey analyst during the 2018 Stanley Cup playoffs in April 2018. He worked as a hockey analyst with Sportsnet and on Hockey Night in Canada until his hiring by the Pittsburgh Penguins in February 2021.

In October 2020, Burke in collaboration with Stephen Brunt released a memoir about Burke's life entitled “Burke’s Law”.

== Personal life ==
Burke is of Irish descent through both parents, with roots in County Roscommon and County Mayo. A dual citizen of the United States and Canada, Burke has two daughters with ex-wife Jennifer Mather Burke, an anchor at CTV News Channel. One of his daughters Katie was married to baseball executive Jared Porter until 2014.

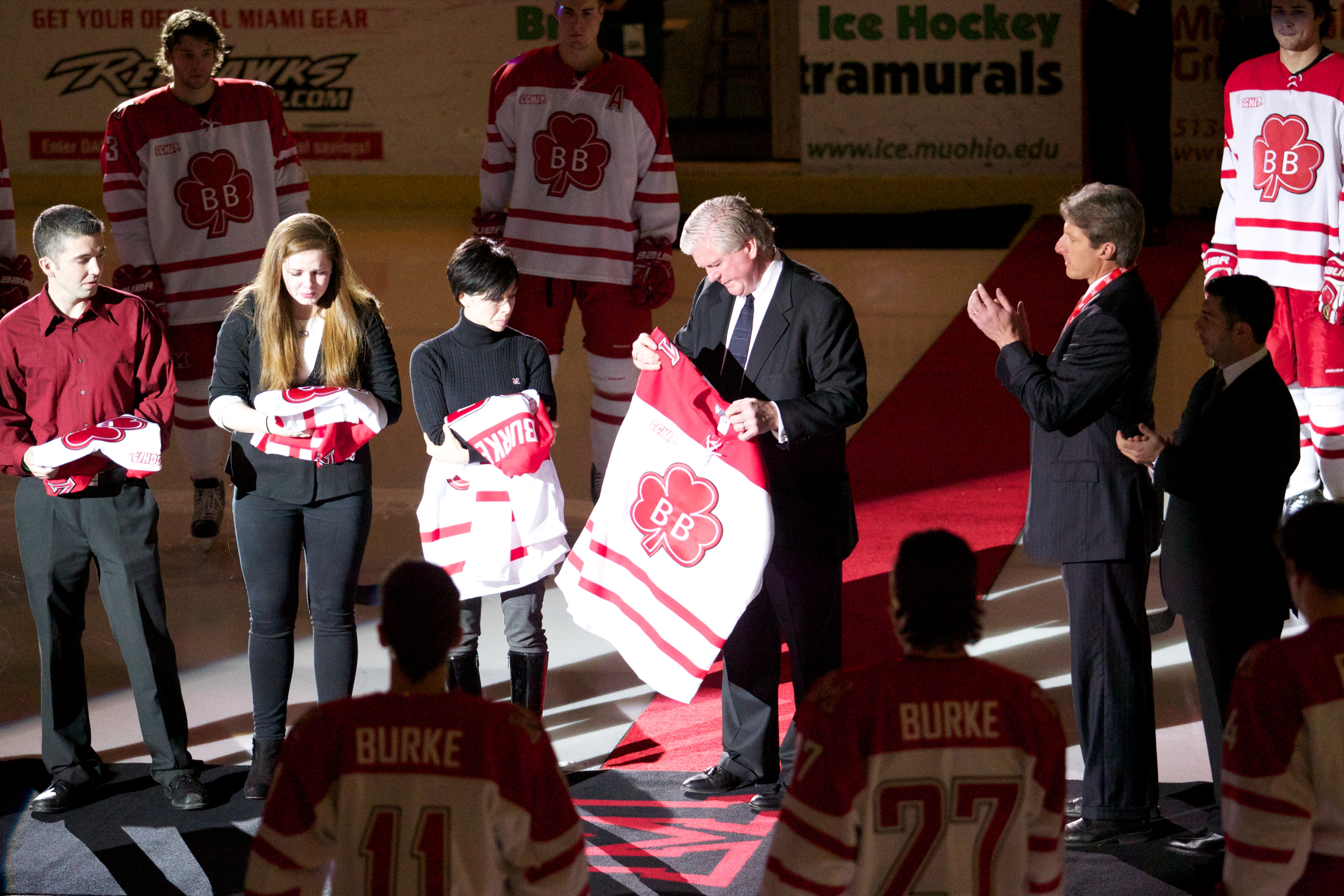
Burke attends a tribute for his son Brendan Burke, on February 5, 2011.

Burke also has four children from a previous marriage, including Patrick, a former scout for the Philadelphia Flyers and as of 2015 a director in the NHL's Department of Player Safety. Burke is a strong supporter of gay rights and attended the 2009 Toronto Gay Pride Parade with his son Brendan Burke, who was gay. On February 5, 2010, Brendan died at age 21 from injuries suffered in a car accident in Indiana. Brian Burke also participated in the 2010 and 2011 Toronto Gay Pride parades. On March 4, 2012, Burke and his son Patrick launched the You Can Play project in honor of Brendan, which is targeted at ending homophobia in sports. Bryan has one older brother, Trevor, who resides in their hometown of Vancouver, BC.

=== Defamation lawsuit filed against anonymous posters ===
On April 26, 2013, Burke filed a lawsuit against 18 individuals who had anonymously posted on websites that the actual reason Burke was fired from the Maple Leafs was for allegedly having an affair with a female sportscaster and fathering her child. Burke said the claims were false and defamatory. He sued to seek court orders disclosing the names of those who posted the accusations.

Burke was able to achieve a minor victory in the Supreme Court of British Columbia, which ruled that anonymous defendants could be served notice of the proceedings through the private messaging on the message boards they had used to make the statements about Burke. As of April 2014, Burke and his legal team had tracked down the identities of several of the individuals and forced them to make retractions.

== Notes ==
Sporting positions
Preceded by Eddie Johnston	General Manager of the Hartford Whalers; 1992–93	Succeeded by Paul Holmgren
Preceded by Pat Quinn	General Manager of the Vancouver Canucks; 1998–2004	Succeeded by Dave Nonis
Preceded by Al Coates	General Manager of the Mighty Ducks of Anaheim/Anaheim Ducks; 2005–08	Succeeded by Bob Murray
Preceded by Cliff Fletcher (interim)	General Manager of the Toronto Maple Leafs; 2008–13	Succeeded by Dave Nonis
Preceded by Jay Feaster	General Manager of the Calgary Flames; Interim; 2013–14	Succeeded by Brad Treliving
