= Brad Treliving =

Canadian ice hockey executive (born 1969)

- Born: August 18, 1969 (age 56) Penticton, British Columbia, Canada
- Height: 6 ft 4 in (193 cm)
- Weight: 225 lb (102 kg; 16 st 1 lb)
- Position: Defence
- Shot: Left
- Played for: AHL; New Haven Senators; PEI Senators; IHL; Indianapolis Ice; ECHL; Winston-Salem Thunderbirds; Greensboro Monarchs; Columbus Chill; Louisville Icehawks; Charlotte Checkers
- NHL draft: Undrafted
- Playing career: 1990–1995

Brad Treliving (born August 18, 1969) is a Canadian ice hockey executive and former professional ice hockey defenceman who most recently served as the general manager of the Toronto Maple Leafs of the National Hockey League (NHL). He previously served as general manager for the Calgary Flames.

In 1996, Treliving co-founded the Western Professional Hockey League (WPHL), and he performed an integral role in the 2001 merger of the Central Hockey League (CHL) and WPHL. In 2003, he became assistant general manager of the Phoenix Coyotes under Don Maloney, while also serving as the GM for the team's American Hockey League affiliate, the San Antonio Rampage. He held both positions until April 28, 2014, when the Calgary Flames hired Treliving to be the new general manager of the Flames. On April 17, 2023, five days after the conclusion of the Flames' 2022–23 season, and with his contract expiring, the team and Treliving mutually agreed to part ways. On May 31, 2023, Treliving was hired as the new general manager of the Toronto Maple Leafs. On March 30, 2026, Treliving was fired by the Maple Leafs after just under three seasons as general manager.

He is the son of Canadian businessman Jim Treliving, co-owner of Boston Pizza restaurant chain.

== Career statistics ==
			Regular season					Playoffs
Season	Team	League	GP	G	A	Pts	PIM	GP	G	A	Pts	PIM
1987–88	Portland Winterhawks	WHL	15	0	5	5	17	—	—	—	—	—
1987–88	Brandon Wheat Kings	WHL	37	6	10	16	20	4	0	0	0	0
1988–89	Penticton Knights	BCJHL	11	0	4	4	71	—	—	—	—	—
1988–89	Spokane Chiefs	WHL	3	0	0	0	8	—	—	—	—	—
1988–89	Regina Pats	WHL	10	0	1	1	26	—	—	—	—	—
1990–91	Winston-Salem Thunderbirds	ECHL	33	1	10	11	72	—	—	—	—	—
1990–91	Greensboro Monarchs	ECHL	4	0	2	2	31	—	—	—	—	—
1991–92	Indianapolis Ice	IHL	14	1	0	1	13	—	—	—	—	—
1991–92	Columbus Chill	ECHL	49	4	25	29	170	—	—	—	—	—
1992–93	New Haven Senators	AHL	8	0	1	1	6	—	—	—	—	—
1992–93	Columbus Chill	ECHL	56	3	14	17	234	—	—	—	—	—
1993–94	Louisville Icehawks	ECHL	37	2	17	19	185	6	0	1	1	47
1993–94	Prince Edward Island Senators	AHL	7	0	0	0	14	—	—	—	—	—
1993–94	Charlotte Checkers	ECHL	6	0	1	1	12	—	—	—	—	—
1994–95	Columbus Chill	ECHL	58	7	16	23	107	3	0	0	0	14
ECHL totals			243	17	85	102	811	9	0	1	1	61
AHL totals			15	0	1	1	20	0	0	0	0	0

Sporting positions
Preceded by Brian Burke (interim)	General manager of the Calgary Flames; 2014–2023	Succeeded by Don Maloney (interim)
Preceded by Kyle Dubas	General manager of the Toronto Maple Leafs; 2023–2026	Succeeded by Ryan Hardy; Brandon Pridham (interim)
