= Jay Feaster =

American ice hockey executive (born 1962)

- Born: Jay Harry Feaster; July 30, 1962 (age 64); Harrisburg, Pennsylvania, U.S.
- Education: Susquehanna University; Georgetown University (JD)
- Occupations: Ice hockey executive, lawyer
- Years active: 1987–present
- Spouse: Anne
- Children: five

Jay Harry Feaster (born July 30, 1962) is a National Hockey League (NHL) executive currently serving as the Executive Director of Community Hockey Development for the Tampa Bay Lightning. He is the former general manager of the Calgary Flames, having served from May 16, 2011 to December 12, 2013, after serving as acting general manager since December 28, 2010, following Darryl Sutter's resignation. He was the general manager of the Tampa Bay Lightning for six years, during which he was named the NHL's executive of the year by The Sporting News in 2004 after guiding the Lightning to their first Stanley Cup championship.

== Hockey career ==
Feaster is a graduate of Susquehanna University, where he was president of the Lambda Beta chapter of Phi Mu Alpha Sinfonia, a professional music fraternity. He also holds a JD from Georgetown University. As a young lawyer with Harrisburg firm McNees, Wallace & Nurick in 1988, he was assigned to deal with the Hershey Entertainment and Resorts Company. His dealings brought him in frequent contact with one of their properties, the Hershey Bears of the American Hockey League (AHL). Though he had no background in hockey, Feaster preferred working with the hockey team, and quickly joined the organization as the assistant to the team's president before taking over the team and stadium's operations as general manager in 1990.He served in the post for eight years during which he was named the AHL's Executive of the Year in 1997 after the Bears won the Calder Cup.

Shortly after, in 1998, he received a call from Tampa Bay Lightning general manager, Jacques Demers, who offered him a position as the team's assistant general manager. Feaster accepted, and quickly took over contractual and legal matters for the organization. He continued in that position through the tenures of Demers and Rick Dudley until he was promoted as Dudley's replacement in February 2002. Under Feaster's management, the Lightning won consecutive Southeast Division titles in 2003 and 2004. In the 2003–04 NHL season, the Lightning won the first Stanley Cup in franchise history while The Sporting News named Feaster as the league's executive of the year. He hired John Tortorella to be the coach of Tampa and led them to their Stanley Cup win. Feaster remained general manager until 2008, when he grew frustrated at interference in the team's hockey operations by the Lightning's new owners Len Barrie and Oren Koules. Though he interviewed for general manager positions with the Minnesota Wild and Florida Panthers, Feaster remained outside of the NHL for two years. He wrote a blog for The Hockey News during that time, and participated in chats on NHL radio. He was hired by the Calgary Flames to serve as assistant general manager to Darryl Sutter in July 2010. and became acting general manager of the Flames on December 28, 2010 upon Sutter's resignation. On May 18, 2011, Feaster became the permanent general manager of the Flames, removing the acting title. As general manager, he hired head coach Bob Hartley, a Stanley Cup, Calder Cup, and Swiss Championship winner. On December 12, 2013, Feaster was relieved as general manager of the Flames.

Due to the 2004–2005 lockout, the Lightning gained an extra year with the Stanley Cup. Feaster used his time to take the Cup back to his hometown of Williamstown, Pennsylvania, where the town declared it "Jay's Day" and had a fire truck parade for him and his family. He also traveled to Hilton Head Island, and took it to his home in Florida. His youngest son Kevin was baptized in the Cup at St. Stephens Catholic Church.

Feaster's draft picks have included two-time Rocket Richard trophy winner Steven Stamkos (2008), Johnny Gaudreau (2011) 2014 Hobey Baker Award Winner, and Calder Finalist in 2015, and Sean Monahan (2013).

On July 7, 2014, Feaster rejoined the Tampa Bay Lightning front office as their executive director of community hockey development. As executive director of hockey development, Feaster has worked with the Lightning sled hockey team, Everfi, Chase, hockey development in schools, and women's hockey programs. Some programs used to encourage women's hockey growth include girls hockey day, and clinics taught by Olympian Anne Schlepper. He also started the program, "Build the Thunder". In this program the Lightning would "Equip the Thunder" by giving 100,000 Lightning branded street hockey sticks and balls to fourth and fifth graders in Hillsborough, Pinellas, Pasco, Polk, and Manatee Counties. They visited 500 elementary schools, donated 500 complete sets of street hockey gear to those schools, and taught street hockey to more than 500 P.E. teachers. Lightning alumni and staff presented full-day street hockey clinics at each of those 500 schools.

Feaster is married with five children. His eldest daughter Theresa is currently working for the 2014–15 NCAA men's hockey national champion team, the Providence Friars.

Preceded by Rick Dudley	General Manager of the Tampa Bay Lightning; 2002–08	Succeeded by Brian Lawton
Preceded by Darryl Sutter	General Manager of the Calgary Flames; 2010–13	Succeeded by Brian Burke (interim)
