= Jeff Solomon =

Ice hockey executive

- Born: November 30, 1957 (age 68)
- Education: San Diego Law School; Rutgers College
- Occupation: Ice hockey executive
- Years active: 2007–present
- Organization: Anaheim Ducks
- Title: Interim general manager
- Term: 2021–2022
- Predecessor: Bob Murray
- Successor: Pat Verbeek

Jeff Solomon is an ice hockey executive who was the Interim General manager of the Anaheim Ducks of the National Hockey League.

On November 9, 2021, the Anaheim Ducks announced that Solomon had been named interim general manager; he was replaced by Pat Verbeek on February 3, 2022.

Prior to working for the Ducks, Solomon held a management role with the Los Angeles Kings for many years.
