= Sports Management Worldwide =

Sports agency in Portland, Oregon

- Company type: Sports Management Training Institution
- Founded: 2002
- Founder: Lynn Lashbrook
- Headquarters: Portland, OR, U.S.
- Website: smww.com

Sports Management Worldwide (SMWW) is an international sports agency and private for-profit sports management training institution based in Portland, Oregon with an office in Honolulu, Hawaii. It is an accredited online Sports Management school and is certified by the Hawaii Department of Education. SMWW offers online sports career training courses, and both graduate and undergraduate programs. Sports Management Worldwide is a member of the North American Society for Sport Management.

SMWW and "Sports Agent" course graduates co-represent professional athletes throughout the world, including:

NFL: Matt Moore of the Kansas City Chiefs, Kyle Sloter of the Chicago Bears, and Akeem Jordan of Philadelphia Eagles.

NBA: Alfonzo McKinnie of the LA Lakers and Rodney Stuckey of the Detroit Pistons.

Faculty:

- Aaron Schatz
- Al Unser Jr.
- Ari Kaplan
- Bret Kanis
- Brodie Waters
- Bryan Harper
- Carl Berman
- Chris Baker
- Clair Cornish
- Dan Duquette
- Dan Evans
- Dane Vandernat
- Dean Oliver
- Dei Lynam
- Dino Caputo
- Doug MacLean
- Gary Ellis
- Hank Jones
- Harry Sinden
- James Kerti
- Jan Wieland
- Jen Mueller
- Jeremy Henderson
- Dr. Jim Krause
- Jim Van Dam
- Joel Corry
- John Wooten
- Ken Jacobs
- Kristen Kuliga
- Lee Fraser
- Lynn Lashbrook
- Manny Schmidt
- Marc Trestman
- Mark Dominik
- Mark Warkentien
- Matt Martin
- Michael Brooks
- Mick Hogan
- Mike Oke
- Mike Smith
- Mike Stoeber
- Mike Tanier
- Mushtaque Mohammed
- Naeem Shabir
- Nick Polk
- Oscar Suarez
- Phil Pritchard
- Philip Hamilton
- Rick Curran
- Rick Sund
- Russ Lande
- Sky Andrew
- Tommy Smyth

Emeritus Faculty:

- Greg Hylton
- Mark Warkentien
- Tom Leip
