= Lynn Lashbrook =

American sports agent and educator (born 1948)

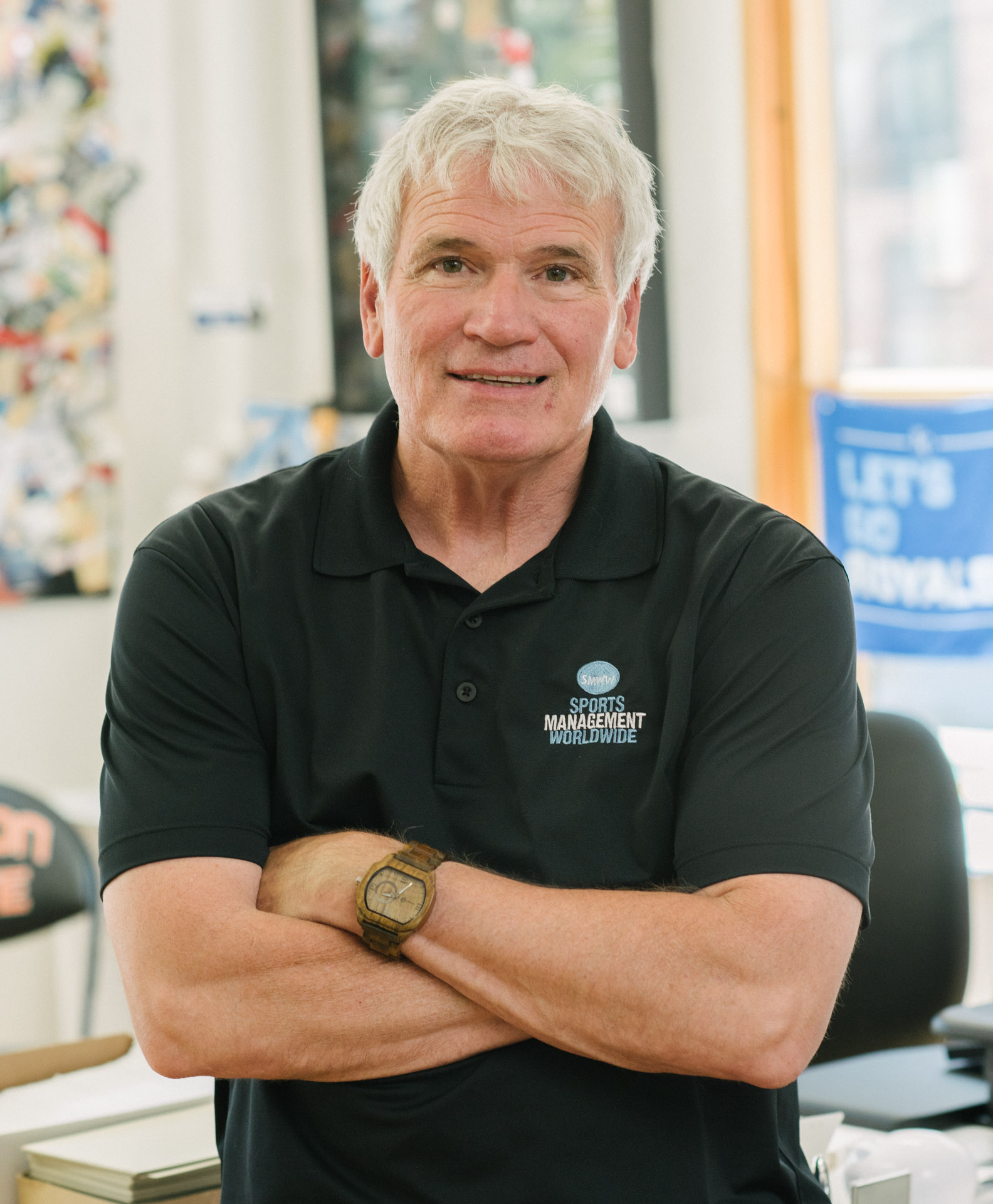
Lynn Lashbrook

Lynn Lashbrook (born October 11, 1948) is an American sports agent and educator. He is currently an NFL certified contract advisor who has represented over 150 NFL football players throughout his career. A former college athletic director and sports agent, Lashbrook is founder and president of Sports Management Worldwide, a sports agency and an international, online sports career training school with over 20,000 graduates from more than 162 countries.

== Career ==
Lashbrook was athletic director at both Southern Illinois-Edwardsville and University of Alaska Fairbanks, and assistant athletic director at the University of Missouri and University of Alaska-Fairbanks (from 1988 to 1993). He was president of the National Association of Academic Advisors for Athletics in 1986.

Lashbrook worked as an assistant professor at Eastern Oregon University and an adjunct professor at Oregon State University, Western Oregon University, Pacific University, Concordia University in Portland and Concordia University Chicago. As an adjunct professor at the United States Sports Academy he was named Professor of the Year in the Distant Learning Program in 2000.

In 1993, Lashbrook joined Jim Steiner and Sports Management Group, leaving in 1998 to start sports-management.com which became Sports Management Worldwide.

Lashbrook was chosen for Fort Hays State University's Alumni Achievement Award in 2009. The award is the highest recognition of its graduates, honoring graduates who have made outstanding and unselfish contributions in service to their community, state, nation, in chosen career fields, or through philanthropic work.

== Oregon Baseball Campaign ==
In 1997, Lashbrook joined an effort to bring Major League Baseball to Portland, Oregon. This group eventually became known as the Oregon Stadium Campaign, a private entity that led Portland's drive for an MLB franchise during the league's relocation of the Montreal Expos. In 2003, he led the lobbying efforts that resulted in a $150 million construction bill for a new baseball stadium in Portland. Under his leadership, the group secured legislative action to subsidize a new stadium with ballplayers' payroll taxes. Due to this campaign, a 25,000-seat stadium in the heart of the city was revitalized rather than torn down and is now home to the Major League Soccer team, Portland Timbers.
