= 2020–21 NHL season =

National Hockey League season

- League: National Hockey League
- Sport: Ice hockey
- Duration: January 13 – July 7, 2021
- Games: 56
- Teams: 31
- TV partner(s): CBC, Sportsnet/SN1/SN360, Citytv, FX, TVA Sports (Canada); NBC, NBCSN, USA, CNBC (United States)

Draft
- Top draft pick: Alexis Lafreniere
- Picked by: New York Rangers

Regular season
- Presidents' Trophy: Colorado Avalanche
- Season MVP: Connor McDavid (Oilers)
- Top scorer: Connor McDavid (Oilers)

Playoffs
- Playoffs MVP: Andrei Vasilevskiy (Lightning)

Stanley Cup
- Champions: Tampa Bay Lightning
- Runners-up: Montreal Canadiens

NHL seasons
- 2019–20 2021–22

The 2020–21 NHL season was the 104th season of operation (103rd season of play) of the National Hockey League (NHL). Due to the COVID-19 pandemic, the regular season was reduced to 56 games and began on January 13, 2021. Due to COVID-19 restrictions on non-essential cross-border travel imposed by the Government of Canada, the league temporarily realigned for this season, dividing the league into four temporary divisions, each of whose teams only played within their respective division, and putting all seven Canadian teams into one division. COVID-19 outbreaks caused the games of most teams to be rescheduled beyond the regular season's original end date of May 8, with the last game being moved to May 19. The playoffs began four days earlier on May 15, under a 16-team format with the top four teams from each division.

The playoffs concluded on July 7, with the Tampa Bay Lightning defeating the Montreal Canadiens in the Stanley Cup Final in five games, winning their second consecutive and third overall Stanley Cup in franchise history.

== League business ==
=== Impact of COVID-19 and temporary realignment ===
The 2020–21 season was originally planned to begin in October 2020 and end with the Stanley Cup being awarded in June 2021, but this had to be changed due to the COVID-19 pandemic and the resulting later than normal conclusion of the previous season. In December, the league said that the season would be shorter than the typical 82 games. Attendance at each arena was limited by local health orders. The league also relies on attendance for at least 50 percent of its revenue, and the players were against spending the full season isolated in neutral-site bubbles similar to their situation during the 2020 playoffs. With the NHL expecting to lose billions of dollars, several team owners privately told NHL Commissioner Gary Bettman that they wanted to suspend the season. But Bettman convinced them that they could not afford to sit out the season in the long run, especially with the expansion team Seattle Kraken joining the league in 2021–22, as well as the prospect of signing new U.S. national television deals with multiple networks.

In July 2020, the league and the NHL Players' Association (NHLPA) initially agreed to tentatively schedule the opening of training camp on November 17, 2020, and the start of the regular season on December 1. In October 2020, both the NHL and NHLPA began discussions on the specific details on how to proceed with the season. On October 6, the NHL and the NHLPA agreed to delay the targeted start date of the regular season to January 1, 2021, and to decide at a later date when to open training camp.

In mid-November 2020, deputy commissioner Bill Daly stated that the league was still targeting a January 1 start, but that "we have to build in flexibility for the hiccups that we expect will come along and have to expect will come along with potential COVID-19 positives and contact tracing requirements", citing "difficulties" faced by Major League Baseball and the National Football League over their handling of the pandemic.

On December 20, the league unveiled its plans for a 56-game regular season, and that the teams would temporarily be realigned into four regional divisions. Due to limitations on travel into and out of Canada, the seven Canadian teams were aligned into a single North division. The seven teams in the North Division played each other nine or ten times during the regular season.

West	Central	North	East
Anaheim Ducks	Carolina Hurricanes	Calgary Flames	Boston Bruins
Arizona Coyotes	Chicago Blackhawks	Edmonton Oilers	Buffalo Sabres
Colorado Avalanche	Columbus Blue Jackets	Montreal Canadiens	New Jersey Devils
Los Angeles Kings	Dallas Stars	Ottawa Senators	New York Islanders
Minnesota Wild	Detroit Red Wings	Toronto Maple Leafs	New York Rangers
San Jose Sharks	Florida Panthers	Vancouver Canucks	Philadelphia Flyers
St. Louis Blues	Nashville Predators	Winnipeg Jets	Pittsburgh Penguins
Vegas Golden Knights	Tampa Bay Lightning		Washington Capitals

To further reduce travel, the regular season schedule was arranged into baseball-style homestands, where multiple consecutive games with the same teams were played at the same location. The only contentious issue with the temporary realignment was which two teams in the Central Time Zone would have to join the West Division. They would have more travel time playing games in the Pacific Time Zone, but they would be against the Anaheim Ducks, Los Angeles Kings, and San Jose Sharks, three of the seven teams that did not qualify for the expanded 24-team 2020 playoffs. It was eventually decided to leave the Dallas Stars in the Central to make up for the team being in the Pacific Division from 1998 to 2013, and the Minnesota Wild and the St. Louis Blues moved to the West.

It was the latest a season had started, and with the fewest games per team, since the 2012–13 season. In that season, each team played only 48 games due to the aftermath of the 2012–13 NHL lockout.

==== Taxi squad ====
Only for this season, the NHL allowed each team to retain an extra traveling group of four to six players, including one goaltender, known as the taxi squad. The taxi squad was designed to enable swift call-ups to the NHL team in the event of positive COVID-19 cases on each team. Waiver-eligible members of the taxi squad are still subject to waiver rules. Daly stated that the taxi squad was devised only to circumvent the difficulties presented by the ongoing COVID-19 pandemic and is not likely to be used again in future seasons.

=== Draft ===
The 2020 NHL entry draft was originally scheduled for June 26–27, 2020, at the Bell Centre in Montreal, Quebec, but was postponed due to the COVID-19 pandemic. It took place on October 6 and 7 in a remote format, hosted from the NHL Network studios in Secaucus, New Jersey. The New York Rangers were awarded the first pick in the 2020 draft after winning the second phase of the draft lottery on August 10 and selected Alexis Lafreniere.

=== Postponed All-Star, outdoor, and international games ===
The league had originally scheduled this season's international, All-Star, and outdoor games prior to the pandemic.

Two preseason games were planned to be played in Europe: the Boston Bruins against Adler Mannheim at SAP Arena in Mannheim, Germany, and the Nashville Predators against SC Bern at PostFinance Arena in Bern, Switzerland. In addition, three regular season games, were also planned: the Boston Bruins and Nashville Predators at O2 Arena in Prague, Czech Republic; and two games between the Colorado Avalanche and Columbus Blue Jackets at Hartwall Arena in Helsinki, Finland, later in the fall.

The 2021 Winter Classic planned for January 1, 2021, was to feature the Minnesota Wild hosting the St. Louis Blues at Target Field. The Florida Panthers and their BB&T Center were then scheduled to host the All-Star Game on January 30, and the Stadium Series game was to be hosted by the Carolina Hurricanes at Carter–Finley Stadium on February 20, against an opponent yet to be announced.

On May 8, 2020, the league postponed the five international games, aiming to reschedule them for the 2021–22 season. The league then announced on October 22, 2020, that the Winter Classic and the All-Star Game were also being postponed to the next year due to "ongoing uncertainty" since fan participation are considered "integral to the[ir] success. The decision to further postpone the Stadium Series game was made on December 23, also because fans would not be able to attend that event.

=== Sponsorship ===
To offset reduced revenue due to games being played with limited to no spectators, the NHL experimented with allowing additional advertising placements that aimed to retain between US$80–90 million that would have otherwise been lost, including allowing teams to sell a sponsor placement on their players' helmets (helmet entitlement partner). Sponsor logos include those along the bottom of the glass just above the boards, sponsor logos on front-row tarps covering unused seats, sponsor logos on the glass behind the benches (in addition to the boards below them), and virtual ads projected just inside the blue lines.

The following teams announced their helmet sponsors for the season:

- Anaheim: Pacific Premier Bancorp
- Arizona: Dignity Health (away), Mountain America Credit Union (home)
- Boston: TD Bank
- Buffalo: Roswell Park Comprehensive Cancer Center (away), KeyBank (home)
- Calgary: Scotiabank
- Carolina: PNC Bank (regular season), DieHard (playoffs)
- Chicago: United Airlines
- Colorado: Ball Corporation
- Columbus: Nationwide Mutual Insurance Company (away), OhioHealth (home)
- Dallas: AT&T
- Detroit: United Wholesale Mortgage
- Edmonton: Rogers Communications
- Florida: Ford Motor Company (games), Baptist Health South Florida (practices)
- Los Angeles: CalHOPE Crisis Counseling Program
- Minnesota: Xcel Energy
- Montreal: Bell Canada
- Nashville: Bridgestone (regular uniforms), Vanderbilt Health (Reverse Retro)
- New Jersey: Prudential Financial
- New York Islanders: UBS (away), Northwell Health (home)
- New York Rangers: Chase Bank
- Ottawa: Canadian Tire (away), Bell Canada (home)
- Philadelphia: Tata Consultancy Services
- Pittsburgh: PPG Industries
- San Jose: Zoom Video Communications (away), SAP (home)
- St. Louis: Enterprise Rent-A-Car (away), Stifel (home)
- Tampa Bay: Tampa General Hospital (away), DEX Imaging (home)
- Toronto: Scotiabank
- Vancouver: Rogers Communications
- Vegas: Allegiant Air (away), Credit One Bank (home)
- Washington: Capital One
- Winnipeg: Bell Canada

On January 5, 2021, the NHL announced that the Central, East, North, and West divisions this season would be sponsored by Discover Card, MassMutual, Scotiabank, and Honda, respectively.

On February 24, 2021, the NHL announced a partnership with DreamHack to serve as its new partner for esports events.

=== Collective bargaining agreement ===
The collective bargaining agreement (CBA), which had been in effect since the end of the 2012–13 NHL lockout, was set to enter its penultimate season in 2020–21.

On July 10, 2020, the league reached an agreement to renew the CBA through the 2025–26 NHL season, including an increase of the minimum player salary to US$750,000 from US$700,000, increasing the maximum value of entry-level contracts, deferring 10% of player salaries for the 2020–21 season to cover costs associated with the pandemic (they were to be paid back over three seasons beginning 2022–23), escrow of player salaries capped at 20% for this season and decreasing incrementally to 14-18%, 10%, and 6% over the three seasons that follow (with the 6% applying thereafter), doubling of the playoff bonus pool to US$32 million, and an agreement for the NHL to negotiate a return to the 2022 and 2026 Winter Olympics (after being absent from the 2018 Winter Olympics).

The CBA was automatically renewed through 2026–27 if player escrow debt falls between US$125 million and US$250 million after the 2024–25 season.

=== Salary cap ===
As part of the new CBA, the salary cap remained at US$81.5 million for the 2020–21 season. Future increases would occur incrementally until the league recovers from the financial impact of the pandemic.

=== Rule changes ===
The league announced on December 22, 2020, that the offside rules have been modified so that players only have to break the plane of the blue line to be ruled onside instead of having to actually touch it with their skate.

=== Player and puck tracking technology ===
For the first time, the NHL deployed the league's player and puck tracking system in all 31 NHL arenas. The system allowed on-air features such as speed displays, puck tracking graphics, and marker graphics hovering above players (though not to the same extremes as the infamous "FoxTrax" graphics from the former NHL on Fox during the 1990s). The league had planned to deploy this technology to all 31 arenas by September 2019, but a change to its primary technology partner delayed implementation until the 2020 playoffs.

After the first week of the season, the league announced that it was temporarily suspending the puck tracking system due to performance issues, stating that "the first supply of 2020–21 pucks did not receive the same precise finishing treatments during the off-season manufacturing process as were used during the 2020 Stanley Cup Playoffs". The player tracking remained unaffected.

=== Expansion ===
On April 30, 2021, the Seattle Kraken paid the final installment of their expansion fee, formally admitting them into the NHL and allowing them to begin acquiring players. The team signed their first player, Quebec Major Junior Hockey League (QMJHL) free agent Luke Henman, on May 12, 2021.

== Coaching changes ==
Coaching changes
Off–season
Team	2019–20 coach	2020–21 coach	Story / Accomplishments
Calgary Flames	Bill Peters; Geoff Ward*	Geoff Ward	Peters resigned on November 29, 2019, after accusations of racism were made by former Rockford IceHogs player Akim Aliu when Peters was coaching the AHL club a decade earlier. Peters spent 1 1/3 seasons with the Flames, registering a record of 12–12–4 to start the season after reaching the first round of the playoffs as the top seed in the Western Conference the previous season. Ward, who served as an assistant coach, was named interim head coach. On September 14, Ward was named head coach.
Dallas Stars	Jim Montgomery; Rick Bowness*	Rick Bowness	Montgomery was dismissed on December 10, 2019, due to "unprofessional conduct inconsistent with the core values and beliefs" of the Stars and the league. He spent 1 1/3 seasons with the Stars, registering a record of 17–11–3 to start the season after reaching the second round of the playoffs the previous season. Bowness, who served as an assistant coach, was named interim head coach. On October 29, Bowness was named head coach.
Minnesota Wild	Bruce Boudreau; Dean Evason*	Dean Evason	Boudreau was fired on February 14, 2020, after 3 2/3 seasons with the team, which had registered a record of 27–23–7 to start the season. The Wild had reached the playoffs in the first two seasons of his tenure in Minnesota but had not qualified for the playoffs since the 2017–18 season. Evason, who had served as an assistant coach with the Wild since the start of the 2018–19 season, was immediately named interim head coach. On July 13, Evason was named head coach.
New Jersey Devils	John Hynes; Alain Nasreddine*	Lindy Ruff	Hynes was fired on December 3, 2019, after 4 1/3 seasons with the team, which had registered a 9–13–4 record to start the season. The Devils reached the playoffs once in Hynes' tenure, and did not advance past the first round in 2018. Nasreddine, who served as an assistant coach, was named interim head coach. Nasreddine finished out the season 19–16–8, outside of the playoffs. On July 9, the Devils named Ruff as head coach who was previously an assistant coach for the New York Rangers.
San Jose Sharks	Peter DeBoer; Bob Boughner*	Bob Boughner	DeBoer was fired on December 11, 2019, after 4 1/3 seasons with the team, which had registered a record of 15–16–2 to start the season. The Sharks qualified for the playoffs in all of the four previous seasons under DeBoer, and advanced to the 2016 Stanley Cup Final. Boughner, who served as an assistant coach, was named interim head coach. On September 22, Boughner was named head coach.
Washington Capitals	Todd Reirden	Peter Laviolette	Reirden was fired on August 24, 2020, after the team failed to get past the first round for the second consecutive year. The team won the division title each year under Reirden, accumulating an 89–46–16 record over two seasons. On September 15, the Capitals named Laviolette as head coach, who had been fired by Nashville the previous season.
In–season
Team	Outgoing coach	Incoming coach	Story / Accomplishments
Buffalo Sabres	Ralph Krueger	Don Granato*	Krueger was fired on March 17, 2021, after parts of two seasons with Buffalo, with the team suffering a 6–18–4 start and a 12-game losing streak. Krueger totaled a 36–49–12 record during his short tenure, and failed to lead the team to the playoffs in his lone complete season. Assistant coach Granato was named interim head coach.
Calgary Flames	Geoff Ward	Darryl Sutter	Ward was fired on March 4, 2021, after parts of two seasons with Calgary, with the team starting the season 11–11–2. Ward amassed a 35–26–5 record during his brief tenure, and led the team to the first round of the playoffs in 2020. Sutter, who had previously coached Calgary from 2002 to 2006, and most recently was head coach of the Los Angeles Kings from 2011 to 2017, was named as his replacement shortly afterwards.
Montreal Canadiens	Claude Julien	Dominique Ducharme*	Julien was fired on February 24, 2021, after parts of five seasons during his second stint as head coach of the Canadiens, which had registered a 9–5–4 record to start the season. Julien compiled a 129–123–35 record during his second stint and the team reached the playoffs twice during his tenure, never advancing past the first round. Assistant coach Ducharme was named interim head coach.

(*) Indicates interim.

== Front office changes ==
General managers
Off–season
Team	2019–20 GM	2020–21 GM	Story / Accomplishments
Arizona Coyotes	John Chayka; Steve Sullivan*	Bill Armstrong	Chayka (after four years with the team) quit unexpectedly as the team headed into the 2020 qualifying round. Sullivan was named interim general manager. Bill Armstrong was named general manager on September 16. Armstrong had previously served as assistant general manager of the St. Louis Blues.
Buffalo Sabres	Jason Botterill	Kevyn Adams	Botterill was fired on June 16, 2020, after three years as the Sabres' general manager. The team failed to make the playoffs during each season. Adams, who was serving as the senior vice president of business administration was named the general manager on the same day.
Florida Panthers	Dale Tallon	Bill Zito	Tallon and the Panthers mutually agreed to part ways on August 10, 2020. Zito, formerly general manager of the Cleveland Monsters, the AHL affiliate of the Columbus Blue Jackets, was named general manager on September 2.
New Jersey Devils	Ray Shero; Tom Fitzgerald*	Tom Fitzgerald	Shero was fired on January 12, 2020, after five years as the Devils' general manager. The team made the playoffs once during his tenure. Fitzgerald was named interim general manager. On July 9, 2020, Fitzgerald was named general manager.
In–season
Team	Outgoing general manager	Incoming general manager	Story / Accomplishments
New York Rangers	Jeff Gorton	Chris Drury	Gorton was fired on May 5, 2021, shortly after the team became eliminated from the playoffs. Gorton joined the team in 2007 as a professional scout, becoming the general manager on July 1, 2015. Under his tenure, the Rangers made the playoffs three times. Drury was promoted to president and GM after previously serving as the associate GM.
Pittsburgh Penguins	Jim Rutherford; Patrik Allvin*	Ron Hextall	Rutherford resigned on January 27, 2021, citing personal reasons. Rutherford joined the Penguins in 2014 as general manager and led the team to two Stanley Cup victories, making the playoffs in all six seasons. Patrik Allvin was named interim general manager. On February 9, 2021, Ron Hextall was announced as the general manager. He was previously GM of the Philadelphia Flyers from 2014 to 2018.

(*) Indicates interim

== Arena changes and regulations ==
- The Colorado Avalanche's home arena was renamed from the Pepsi Center to Ball Arena on October 22, 2020, under a new naming rights agreement with the Ball Corporation.
- The New York Islanders played all of their home games for the 2020–21 season at Nassau Coliseum. The team had split their home games between Nassau and Barclays Center during the previous two seasons. The Islanders moved to UBS Arena in the 2021–22 season. In June 2020, Mikhail Prokhorov, whose company ran the Nassau Coliseum, announced that the Coliseum would be closed indefinitely while it seeks new investors to take it over and assume the remaining debt. In August 2020, the Coliseum's new leaseholders said that the Islanders would continue to play their home games at the arena for the 2020–21 season.

=== COVID-19 restrictions ===
All American teams hosted a limited amount of in-person spectators during the regular season; only three admitted them at the start of the season. While several Canadian teams submitted proposals (including Calgary, Edmonton, and Ottawa) to allow for in-person spectators, they were all rejected by local health authorities. All North Division games were played behind closed doors for the entirety of the regular season. During the Stanley Cup playoffs, a number of U.S. teams further increased their capacity amid a gradual loosening of restrictions tied to vaccine availability, and three of the Canadian playoff teams admitted spectators for the first time, although only one team offered tickets to the general public.

Team	Home games with spectators	Limitations	Source
Anaheim	Some	April 16: 10% capacity	
Arizona	All	Original: 25% capacity April 17: 50% capacity	
Boston	Some	March 22: 12% capacity May 10: 25% capacity May 29: Full capacity	
Buffalo	Some	April 3: 10% capacity, with negative COVID PCR test no older than 72 hours or proof of full vaccination required (this was originally scheduled to take effect on March 20, but the game was postponed due to players from the opposing team being under league COVID protocol)	
Calgary	None	All games were played behind closed doors.	
Carolina	Some	March 4: 15% capacity May 17: 12,000 spectators	
Chicago	Some	May 9: 25% capacity; last American team to begin allowing spectators.	
Colorado	Some	April 2: 22% capacity May 12: 42.3% capacity	
Columbus	Some	March 2: 10% capacity March 9: 25% capacity	
Dallas	All	Original: 25% capacity	
Detroit	Some	March 9: 750 spectators	
Edmonton	None	All games were played behind closed doors.	
Florida	All	Original: 30% capacity May 16: 50% capacity	
Los Angeles	Some	April 20: 10% capacity	
Minnesota	Some	April 5: 3,000 spectators	
Montreal	Some (playoffs only)	May 29: 2,500 spectators; first Canadian team to begin allowing spectators. June 18: 3,500 spectators	
Nashville	Some	January 26: 15% capacity April 19: 33% capacity	
New Jersey	Some	March 1: 10% capacity April 2: 20% capacity	
NY Islanders	Some	March 18: 10% capacity, with negative COVID PCR test no older than 72 hours or proof of full vaccination required May 19: 25% capacity June 3: 12,000 spectators	
NY Rangers	Some	February 26: 10% capacity, with negative COVID PCR test no older than 72 hours or proof of full vaccination required	
Ottawa	None	All games were played behind closed doors.	
Philadelphia	Some	March 7: 15% capacity	
Pittsburgh	Some	March 1: 15% capacity April 15: 25% capacity May 18: 50% capacity	
San Jose	Some	April 26: 1,000 spectators, negative COVID-19 test or proof of full vaccination was required to enter, initially began with 520 spectators before scaling to the legal maximum	
St. Louis	Some	February 2: 1,400 spectators May 21: 50% capacity	
Tampa Bay	Some	March 13: 3,800 spectators May 5: 4,200 spectators May 20: 7,000 spectators	
Toronto	Invited guests only (playoffs only)	All games were played behind closed doors. May 31 playoff game was played with 550 invited healthcare workers; members of the general public were not admitted.	
Vancouver	None	All games were played behind closed doors.	
Vegas	Some	March 1: 15% capacity May 16: 50% capacity June 1: Full capacity	
Washington	Some	April 27: 10% capacity May 14: 25% capacity	
Winnipeg	Invited guests only (playoffs only)	All games were played behind closed doors. Up to 500 invited healthcare workers and the immediate families of team personnel were allowed beginning June 2.	

Due to Santa Clara County banning all contact sports in response to a local rise of COVID-19 cases, the San Jose Sharks began the season on an extended road trip. Their first two home games on February 1 and 3 against the Vegas Golden Knights was to have been held at Gila River Arena, the home of division rival Arizona Coyotes, but ended up being postponed due to a COVID outbreak among the Golden Knights. On January 25, Santa Clara County health officials announced that they were lifting the ban, but the Sharks stated that they still needed to work out several health and safety issues and therefore did not return to SAP Center until February 13.

The Tampa Bay Lightning initially announced that it would cap Amalie Arena at 20 percent capacity. However, the team's ownership later announced that no spectators were going to be allowed at the arena for Lightning games through at least February 2, 2021, due to concerns surrounding local case numbers. The team later announced on March 4 that a maximum of 3,800 fans would be allowed at home games beginning March 13. On May 20, the arena was allowed to expand to 7,000 spectators.

On February 10, 2021, Governor of New York Andrew Cuomo announced that the state would allow large sports venues to host spectators at 10% of their capacity beginning February 23, 2021, affecting the Buffalo Sabres, New York Islanders, and New York Rangers. All spectators were required to present proof of a negative COVID-19 PCR test within 72 hours of the event, and may also be required to submit to a rapid test if their PCR test was within more than 48 hours of the event. By the end of March, Madison Square Garden removed the requirement for testing if the spectator is fully vaccinated (no fewer than 14 days since the spectator received the second dose of a two-dose vaccine).

On March 1, 2021, Governor of Pennsylvania Tom Wolf announced that large indoor sports venues could now host spectators at 15% of their capacity, affecting the Philadelphia Flyers and Pittsburgh Penguins.The Penguins began hosting spectators the next day, while the Flyers began hosting spectators with their next home game on March 7. With their playoff run, the Penguins were able to increase to 50% capacity on May 18.

Monumental Sports & Entertainment, parent company of the Washington Capitals, applied for a waiver for 10% capacity in Capital One Arena in late March. The city government initially did not grant the waiver, leaving it as pending; it was subsequently granted on April 9. The Capitals subsequently announced that they would admit spectators beginning with a home game on April 27. The city later allowed an expansion to 25%, and the team would have been allowed to return to full capacity on June 11 if the Capitals advanced further into the playoffs.

The Government of California announced on April 2 that indoor venues could host spectators at limited capacities with proof of vaccination or a negative COVID-19 test, affecting the Anaheim Ducks, Los Angeles Kings, and San Jose Sharks. The Ducks and Kings began admitting spectators at 10% capacity on April 16 and April 20, while the Sharks began admitting spectators on April 26, scaling up from 520 to the cap of 1,000 over time.

On April 29, 2021, the city of Chicago announced that it would allow United Center to operate at a quarter of its capacity beginning May 9, making the Blackhawks the final U.S.-based NHL team to reopen its arena to spectators.

On May 18, 2021, the Canadiens announced that under changes to Quebec public health orders and curfews, it would be able to admit 2,500 spectators to Bell Centre no earlier than May 28. The Canadiens' Game 5 victory in their first-round series against Toronto on May 27 took the series back home to Montreal on May 29, making them the first Canadian NHL team to play a game with in-person spectators this season. On May 31, Ontario Premier Doug Ford announced that the provincial government and Maple Leaf Sports & Entertainment would invite 550 fully-vaccinated health care workers to attend Game 7 at Scotiabank Arena, marking the Maple Leafs' first, and ultimately, only, home game with any spectators this season.

In June, the Manitoba government gave clearance to allow up to 500 fully-vaccinated health care workers, as well as the immediate family members of team staff, to attend Winnipeg Jets home games beginning with their second-round (North Division finals) series against Montreal.

== Regular season ==
The regular season began on January 13, 2021. Teams played games within their division only. The teams in the three U.S. divisions played each of their seven division opponents eight times.

=== Outdoor games ===
On January 11, 2021, the NHL announced two outdoor games would be played on February 20 and 21 at the Edgewood Tahoe Resort in Lake Tahoe; the Flyers would play the Bruins and the Avalanche would play the Golden Knights.

The Saturday game between Colorado and Vegas was initially beset by ice quality issues; there was a lack of cloud cover, and as a result the playing surface was partially melted by direct sunlight. The game suffered a postponement of approximately eight hours following the end of the first period, with Colorado leading 1–0, in order to wait for sunset and repair the ice; play resumed at 9:00 PM local time (midnight ET), with Colorado ultimately winning 3–2. In an attempt to avoid further issues, the Sunday game between Boston and Philadelphia was rescheduled for 4:30 PM (7:30 ET), five and a half hours after the originally planned start time.

=== Postponed games ===
==== COVID-19-related ====
- The Dallas Stars' first four games (road contests against the Florida Panthers on January 14 and 15 and the Tampa Bay Lightning on January 17 and 19) were postponed after six Dallas players and two staff members tested positive for COVID-19 by January 8. At least eight games involving either Dallas, Florida, or Tampa Bay were rescheduled to accommodate the postponements, including rescheduling one of the Dallas–Tampa Bay games for May 10, two days after the regular season was originally scheduled to end.
- The Carolina Hurricanes–Nashville Predators game on January 19 was postponed "out of an abundance of caution" after four Carolina players were added to the COVID-19 list. On the following day, the league decided to also postpone Carolina's next two games against Florida on January 21 and 23. The league further postponed Carolina's game against Tampa Bay on January 26, and then rescheduled at least seven games involving either of these four teams.
- The St. Louis Blues–Vegas Golden Knights game on January 28 was postponed after Vegas defenseman Alex Pietrangelo and their entire coaching staff tested positive. The league further postponed Vegas' next two games at the San Jose Sharks on February 1 and 3. Six games were then rescheduled involving either of those three teams.
- Three New Jersey Devils games (road contests against the Pittsburgh Penguins on February 2 and 4 and a home game against the New York Rangers on February 6) were postponed after 16 New Jersey players were placed on the COVID-19 protocol list.
- Four Buffalo Sabres road games (at the New York Islanders on February 2 and 4, and at the Boston Bruins on February 6 and 8) were postponed. The Sabres were the last team to play the Devils before the three aforementioned New Jersey games were postponed. The league had initially only postponed Buffalo's February 2 game after the team's flight to New York was delayed due to weather conditions and thus pushed back the required COVID-19 tracing protocols, but decided to postpone more games after Sabres players were placed on the COVID-19 protocol list. On February 6, the league rescheduled 27 games involving Buffalo, New Jersey, or other East Division teams.
- Four Minnesota Wild games (at the Colorado Avalanche on February 4, two home games against the Arizona Coyotes on February 6 and 7, and a home game against St. Louis on February 9) were postponed after five Wild players were placed on the COVID-19 protocol list.
- Four additional Avalanche games (two road games at St. Louis on February 6 and 7, and two home games against Arizona on February 9 and 11) were postponed after forwards Tyson Jost and Gabriel Landeskog were placed on the COVID-19 protocol list. As a result, the Blues and Coyotes' two-game set in St. Louis on March 29 and 31 was rescheduled to February 6 and 8, originally making it a four-game series between the two teams after having previously played on February 2 and 4.
- On February 8, the league postponed seven additional games involving Buffalo (against the Washington Capitals on February 11 and 13), Minnesota (against St. Louis on February 11 and the Los Angeles Kings on February 13), and New Jersey (against the Philadelphia Flyers on February 11 and 13 and Boston on February 15). Additional players on all three teams were placed on the COVID-19 protocol list, as well as Buffalo head coach Ralph Krueger testing positive for the virus. As a result, the April 15 St. Louis–Arizona game was moved to February 12; with the previous postponements, and their originally scheduled games on February 13 and 15 in Arizona, the Blues and the Coyotes played seven consecutive times.
- The Flyers–Capitals game on February 9 was postponed after Philadelphia players were placed on the COVID-19 protocol list. The league further postponed the Flyers' February 14 game at the Rangers.
- The Sharks–Golden Knights game on February 25, already a rescheduling from earlier in the month, was postponed after Sharks forward Tomas Hertl was placed on the COVID-19 protocol list. The game was later rescheduled for April 23, then for May 10 after further schedule changes.
- Two Bruins games (at Buffalo on March 20 and a home game against the Islanders on March 23) were postponed after five Bruins players were placed on the COVID-19 protocol list. The Buffalo game was rescheduled to April 20 while the Islanders game was rescheduled to April 23.
- The Edmonton Oilers–Montreal Canadiens games on March 22, 24 and 26, and the Ottawa Senators–Montreal game on March 28 were postponed after Canadiens forwards Joel Armia and Jesperi Kotkaniemi were placed on the COVID-19 protocol list. As a result, thirteen North Division games were rescheduled.
- Ten Vancouver Canucks games (initial four were March 31 vs. Calgary, April 3 at Edmonton, and April 4 and 6 at Winnipeg) were postponed after two Canucks players and a member of its coaching staff were placed on the COVID-19 protocol list. By April 4, the protocol list had grown to all but six players on Vancouver's active roster. The league further postponed Vancouver's two road games in Calgary on April 8 and 10. On April 10, the NHL announced that 13 North Division games would be rescheduled to accommodate the Canucks, with the team's final regular season game scheduled on May 16. On April 15, two home games scheduled for April 16 and 17 against Edmonton and Toronto, respectively, were postponed.
- Three Avalanche games (April 16 and 18 vs. Los Angeles, April 20 at St. Louis) were postponed after three Avalanche players were placed on the COVID-19 protocol list.

==== Other ====
- Four Stars home games (against Nashville on February 15–16, and against Tampa Bay on February 18 and 20) were postponed due to the February 13–17, 2021 North American winter storm. As a result, the Lightning's road game at Carolina on March 28 was moved up to February 20, while the Hurricanes' originally scheduled home game against the Chicago Blackhawks was rescheduled to a later date. The Lightning–Stars home contests were later rescheduled to March 2 and 16, while the Predators–Stars matchups were moved to March 7 and 21. Two Stars road games in Columbus, three in Tampa, two in Chicago, and one in Nashville were also rescheduled.
- The Blues–Kings game on March 15 was postponed as a result of the March 2021 North American blizzard. The Kings had previously played a two-game series against the Avalanche, and were unable to leave Denver and return to Los Angeles before the storm hit. The game was rescheduled to May 10.
- The Blues–Wild game on April 12 was postponed following the killing of Daunte Wright which took place at nearby Brooklyn Center. The game was rescheduled to May 12.

== Standings ==
Central Division
Pos	Team	GP	W	L	OTL	RW	GF	GA	GD	Pts
1	y – Carolina Hurricanes	56	36	12	8	27	179	136	+43	80
2	x – Florida Panthers	56	37	14	5	26	189	153	+36	79
3	x – Tampa Bay Lightning	56	36	17	3	29	181	147	+34	75
4	x – Nashville Predators	56	31	23	2	21	156	154	+2	64
5	Dallas Stars	56	23	19	14	17	158	154	+4	60
6	Chicago Blackhawks	56	24	25	7	15	161	186	−25	55
7	Detroit Red Wings	56	19	27	10	17	127	171	−44	48
8	Columbus Blue Jackets	56	18	26	12	12	137	187	−50	48

Source: National Hockey League
Rules for classification: 1) Fewer number of games played (GP, only during regular season); 2) Greater number of regulation wins (RW); 3) Greater number of wins in regulation and overtime, excluding shootout wins (ROW); 4) Greater number of total wins, including shootouts (W); 5) Greater number of points earned in head-to-head play; if teams played an uneven number of head-to-head games, the result of the first game on the home ice of the team with the extra home game is discarded; 6) Greater goal differential (GD); 7) Greater number of goals scored (GF)
x – Clinched playoff spot; y – Clinched division

East Division
Pos	Team	GP	W	L	OTL	RW	GF	GA	GD	Pts
1	y – Pittsburgh Penguins	56	37	16	3	29	196	156	+40	77
2	x – Washington Capitals	56	36	15	5	29	191	163	+28	77
3	x – Boston Bruins	56	33	16	7	25	168	136	+32	73
4	x – New York Islanders	56	32	17	7	24	156	128	+28	71
5	New York Rangers	56	27	23	6	24	177	157	+20	60
6	Philadelphia Flyers	56	25	23	8	17	163	201	−38	58
7	New Jersey Devils	56	19	30	7	15	145	194	−49	45
8	Buffalo Sabres	56	15	34	7	11	138	199	−61	37

Source: National Hockey League
Rules for classification: 1) Fewer number of games played (GP, only during regular season); 2) Greater number of regulation wins (RW); 3) Greater number of wins in regulation and overtime, excluding shootout wins (ROW); 4) Greater number of total wins, including shootouts (W); 5) Greater number of points earned in head-to-head play; if teams played an uneven number of head-to-head games, the result of the first game on the home ice of the team with the extra home game is discarded; 6) Greater goal differential (GD); 7) Greater number of goals scored (GF)
x – Clinched playoff spot; y – Clinched division

North Division
Pos	Team	GP	W	L	OTL	RW	GF	GA	GD	Pts
1	y – Toronto Maple Leafs	56	35	14	7	29	187	148	+39	77
2	x – Edmonton Oilers	56	35	19	2	31	183	154	+29	72
3	x – Winnipeg Jets	56	30	23	3	24	170	154	+16	63
4	x – Montreal Canadiens	56	24	21	11	20	159	168	−9	59
5	Calgary Flames	56	26	27	3	22	156	161	−5	55
6	Ottawa Senators	56	23	28	5	18	157	190	−33	51
7	Vancouver Canucks	56	23	29	4	17	151	188	−37	50

Source: National Hockey League
Rules for classification: 1) Fewer number of games played (GP, only during regular season); 2) Greater number of regulation wins (RW); 3) Greater number of wins in regulation and overtime, excluding shootout wins (ROW); 4) Greater number of total wins, including shootouts (W); 5) Greater number of points earned in head-to-head play; if teams played an uneven number of head-to-head games, the result of the first game on the home ice of the team with the extra home game is discarded; 6) Greater goal differential (GD); 7) Greater number of goals scored (GF)
x – Clinched playoff spot; y – Clinched division

West Division
Pos	Team	GP	W	L	OTL	RW	GF	GA	GD	Pts
1	p – Colorado Avalanche	56	39	13	4	35	197	133	+64	82
2	x – Vegas Golden Knights	56	40	14	2	30	191	124	+67	82
3	x – Minnesota Wild	56	35	16	5	27	181	160	+21	75
4	x – St. Louis Blues	56	27	20	9	19	169	170	−1	63
5	Arizona Coyotes	56	24	26	6	19	153	176	−23	54
6	Los Angeles Kings	56	21	28	7	19	143	170	−27	49
7	San Jose Sharks	56	21	28	7	15	151	199	−48	49
8	Anaheim Ducks	56	17	30	9	11	126	179	−53	43

Source: National Hockey League
Rules for classification: 1) Fewer number of games played (GP, only during regular season); 2) Greater number of regulation wins (RW); 3) Greater number of wins in regulation and overtime, excluding shootout wins (ROW); 4) Greater number of total wins, including shootouts (W); 5) Greater number of points earned in head-to-head play; if teams played an uneven number of head-to-head games, the result of the first game on the home ice of the team with the extra home game is discarded; 6) Greater goal differential (GD); 7) Greater number of goals scored (GF)
p – Clinched Presidents' Trophy; x – Clinched playoff spot

== Playoffs ==
=== Bracket ===
In each round, teams competed in a best-of-seven series following a 2–2–1–1–1 format (scores in the bracket indicate the number of games won in each best-of-seven series). The team with home ice advantage played at home for games one and two (and games five and seven, if necessary), and the other team was at home for games three and four (and game six, if necessary). The top four teams in each division made the playoffs.

In the first round, the fourth-seeded team in each division played against the division winner from their division. The other series matched the second and third place teams from the divisions. In each round, home ice advantage was awarded to the team that had the better regular season record. Teams advancing to the Stanley Cup semifinals were re-seeded one through four based on regular season record.

First round
C1	Carolina	4
C4	Nashville	2
Central Division
C2	Florida	2
C3	Tampa Bay	4
E1	Pittsburgh	2
E4	NY Islanders	4
East Division
E2	Washington	1
E3	Boston	4
N1	Toronto	3
N4	Montreal	4
North Division
N2	Edmonton	0
N3	Winnipeg	4
W1	Colorado	4
W4	St. Louis	0
West Division
W2	Vegas	4
W3	Minnesota	3

Second round
C1	Carolina	1
C3	Tampa Bay	4
E4	NY Islanders	4
E3	Boston	2
N4	Montreal	4
N3	Winnipeg	0
W1	Colorado	2
W2	Vegas	4

Stanley Cup semifinals
1	Vegas	2
4	Montreal	4
2	Tampa Bay	4
3	NY Islanders	3

Stanley Cup Final
4	Montreal	1
2	Tampa Bay	4

== Statistics ==
=== Scoring leaders ===
The following players led the league in regular season points at the completion of games played on May 15, 2021.

Player	Team	GP	G	A	Pts	+/–	PIM
Connor McDavid	Edmonton Oilers	56	33	72	105	+21	20
Leon Draisaitl	Edmonton Oilers	56	31	53	84	+29	22
Brad Marchand	Boston Bruins	53	29	40	69	+26	46
Mitch Marner	Toronto Maple Leafs	55	20	47	67	+21	20
Auston Matthews	Toronto Maple Leafs	52	41	25	66	+21	10
Mikko Rantanen	Colorado Avalanche	52	30	36	66	+30	34
Patrick Kane	Chicago Blackhawks	56	15	51	66	–7	14
Nathan MacKinnon	Colorado Avalanche	48	20	45	65	+22	37
Mark Scheifele	Winnipeg Jets	56	21	42	63	–4	12
Sidney Crosby	Pittsburgh Penguins	55	24	38	62	+8	26

=== Leading goaltenders ===
The following goaltenders led the league in regular season goals against average at the conclusion of games played on May 15, 2021, while playing at least 1,320 minutes.

Player	Team	GP	TOI	W	L	OTL	GA	SO	SV%	GAA
Alex Nedeljkovic	Carolina Hurricanes	23	1,392:02	15	5	3	44	3	.932	1.90
Philipp Grubauer	Colorado Avalanche	40	2,366:52	30	9	1	77	7	.922	1.95
Marc-Andre Fleury	Vegas Golden Knights	36	2,146:36	26	10	0	71	6	.928	1.98
Semyon Varlamov	New York Islanders	36	2,116:56	19	11	4	72	7	.929	2.04
Chris Driedger	Florida Panthers	23	1,361:36	14	6	3	47	3	.927	2.07
Andrei Vasilevskiy	Tampa Bay Lightning	42	2,523:37	31	10	1	93	5	.925	2.21
Juuse Saros	Nashville Predators	36	2,051:48	21	11	1	78	3	.927	2.28
Tuukka Rask	Boston Bruins	24	1,396:27	15	5	2	53	2	.913	2.28
Mike Smith	Edmonton Oilers	32	1,846:33	21	6	2	71	3	.923	2.31
Jake Oettinger	Dallas Stars	29	1,604:08	11	8	7	63	1	.911	2.36

== NHL awards ==
Voting concluded immediately after the end of the regular season. Statistics-based awards such as the Art Ross Trophy, Maurice "Rocket" Richard Trophy, William M. Jennings Trophy and the Presidents' Trophy are announced at the end of the regular season. The Stanley Cup and the Conn Smythe Trophy is presented at the end of the Stanley Cup Final.

The league had initially announced that both the Prince of Wales Trophy and the Clarence S. Campbell Bowl, normally presented at the end of the Eastern and Western conference finals, respectively, would not be awarded due to the suspension of conferences this season. After the opponents in the Stanley Cup semifinals were set, it was instead decided that the New York Islanders and Tampa Bay Lightning, both of whom normally play in the Eastern Conference, would play for the Wales Trophy, thus leaving the Montreal Canadiens and Vegas Golden Knights to play for the Campbell Bowl.

For the second consecutive season, no NHL Awards ceremony took place due to the COVID-19 pandemic. The Adams, Byng, Clancy, Gregory, Masterton, Messier and Selke trophies were awarded during the Stanley Cup semifinals, while the Calder, Hart, Lindsay, Norris and Vezina trophies were announced during the Stanley Cup Final.

2020–21 NHL awards
Award	Recipient(s)	Runner(s)-up/Finalists
Presidents' Trophy (Best regular-season record)	Colorado Avalanche	Vegas Golden Knights
Prince of Wales Trophy (Stanley Cup semifinals winner)	Tampa Bay Lightning	New York Islanders
Clarence S. Campbell Bowl (Stanley Cup semifinals winner)	Montreal Canadiens	Vegas Golden Knights
Art Ross Trophy (Player with most points)	Connor McDavid (Edmonton Oilers)	Leon Draisaitl (Edmonton Oilers)
Bill Masterton Memorial Trophy (Perseverance, sportsmanship, and dedication)	Oskar Lindblom (Philadelphia Flyers)	Matt Dumba (Minnesota Wild); Patrick Marleau (San Jose Sharks)
Calder Memorial Trophy (Best first-year player)	Kirill Kaprizov (Minnesota Wild)	Alex Nedeljkovic (Carolina Hurricanes); Jason Robertson (Dallas Stars)
Conn Smythe Trophy (Most valuable player, playoffs)	Andrei Vasilevskiy (Tampa Bay Lightning)	Nikita Kucherov (Tampa Bay Lightning)
Frank J. Selke Trophy (Defensive forward)	Aleksander Barkov (Florida Panthers)	Patrice Bergeron (Boston Bruins); Mark Stone (Vegas Golden Knights)
Hart Memorial Trophy (Most valuable player, regular season)	Connor McDavid (Edmonton Oilers)	Nathan MacKinnon (Colorado Avalanche); Auston Matthews (Toronto Maple Leafs)
Jack Adams Award (Best coach)	Rod Brind'Amour (Carolina Hurricanes)	Dean Evason (Minnesota Wild); Joel Quenneville (Florida Panthers)
James Norris Memorial Trophy (Best defenseman)	Adam Fox (New York Rangers)	Victor Hedman (Tampa Bay Lightning); Cale Makar (Colorado Avalanche)
King Clancy Memorial Trophy (Leadership and humanitarian contribution)	Pekka Rinne (Nashville Predators)	Kurtis Gabriel (San Jose Sharks); P. K. Subban (New Jersey Devils)
Lady Byng Memorial Trophy (Sportsmanship and excellence)	Jaccob Slavin (Carolina Hurricanes)	Auston Matthews (Toronto Maple Leafs); Jared Spurgeon (Minnesota Wild)
Ted Lindsay Award (Outstanding player)	Connor McDavid (Edmonton Oilers)	Sidney Crosby (Pittsburgh Penguins); Auston Matthews (Toronto Maple Leafs)
Mark Messier Leadership Award (Leadership and community activities)	Patrice Bergeron (Boston Bruins)	N/A
Maurice "Rocket" Richard Trophy (Top goal-scorer)	Auston Matthews (Toronto Maple Leafs)	Connor McDavid (Edmonton Oilers)
Jim Gregory General Manager of the Year Award (Top general manager)	Lou Lamoriello (New York Islanders)	Marc Bergevin (Montreal Canadiens); Bill Zito (Florida Panthers)
Vezina Trophy (Best goaltender)	Marc-Andre Fleury (Vegas Golden Knights)	Philipp Grubauer (Colorado Avalanche); Andrei Vasilevskiy (Tampa Bay Lightning)
William M. Jennings Trophy (Goaltender(s) of team with fewest goals against)	Marc-Andre Fleury and Robin Lehner (Vegas Golden Knights)	Semyon Varlamov and Ilya Sorokin (New York Islanders)

=== All-Star teams ===
Position	First Team	Second Team	Position	All-Rookie
G	Andrei Vasilevskiy, Tampa Bay Lightning	Marc-Andre Fleury, Vegas Golden Knights	G	Alex Nedeljkovic, Carolina Hurricanes
D	Adam Fox, New York Rangers	Victor Hedman, Tampa Bay Lightning	D	K'Andre Miller, New York Rangers
D	Cale Makar, Colorado Avalanche	Dougie Hamilton, Carolina Hurricanes	D	Ty Smith, New Jersey Devils
C	Connor McDavid, Edmonton Oilers	Auston Matthews, Toronto Maple Leafs	F	Kirill Kaprizov, Minnesota Wild
RW	Mitch Marner, Toronto Maple Leafs	Mikko Rantanen, Colorado Avalanche	F	Josh Norris, Ottawa Senators
LW	Brad Marchand, Boston Bruins	Jonathan Huberdeau, Florida Panthers	F	Jason Robertson, Dallas Stars

== Uniforms ==
=== Wholesale team changes ===
- The Buffalo Sabres reintroduced their original royal blue, gold and white uniforms full-time, worn by the team from 1970 to 1996, with slight, subtle changes to the crest and the blue home jersey.
- The Calgary Flames reintroduced their original red, yellow, and white uniforms, worn by the team from 1980 to 1994. The design had been used as an alternate, retro jersey in recent seasons. The team's primarily red and black former home sweater was changed to be the alternate jersey starting this season.
- The Colorado Avalanche changed equipment colors from black to blue. Previously, the team sported black helmets, gloves and pants beginning with their first season in 1995–96.
- The Dallas Stars introduced new alternate black and neon green uniforms.
- The Ottawa Senators reintroduced its 1997–2007 logo, with a gold outline as opposed to red, and a uniform set similar to the jerseys used from 1992 to 1995.
- The San Jose Sharks reintroduced their original Heritage jersey worn by the team from 1991 to 1998, to be worn during select games to celebrate their 30th anniversary.
- The Vegas Golden Knights introduced new alternate metallic gold uniforms.
- The Washington Capitals introduced alternate navy blue uniforms based on the ones they wore during the 2018 NHL Stadium Series.
- From January 16, 2021, through the end of February (in honour of Martin Luther King Jr. Day and Black History Month), all players wore commemorative "Celebrating Equality" decals on their helmets featuring an image of Willie O'Ree—the first black player in the NHL.

=== "Reverse Retro" jerseys ===
On November 16, 2020, the NHL introduced Adidas "Reverse Retro" jerseys for all 31 teams, which feature throwback uniforms with a modern twist.

West Division

- Anaheim Ducks: The team's first third jersey in 1995, featuring team mascot Wildwing breaking out a sheet of ice, except white instead of jade.
- Arizona Coyotes: The team's first third jersey in 1999, originally colored green but now purple.
- Colorado Avalanche: 1979 Quebec Nordiques jerseys, the team's first season after the NHL–WHA merger when they were the Nordiques albeit in a 1991 design and using the Avalanche's burgundy and blue color scheme.
- Los Angeles Kings: 1989 throwbacks, when Wayne Gretzky broke the NHL record for all-time leading scorer. The design has the 1988–1998 era logo and is colored in forum blue (purple) and gold colors used on the team's original uniforms from 1967 to 1988.
- Minnesota Wild: Features the current Wild logo with the style and colors of the 1978 Minnesota North Stars jerseys in white, with yellow numbers with green block shadows in reverse of the originals.
- St. Louis Blues: 1995 throwbacks, but colored in red.
- San Jose Sharks: The team's first third jersey in 1998, but now gray.
- Vegas Golden Knights: Based on the jerseys worn by the 1995 Las Vegas Thunder of the International Hockey League, except the teams's secondary logo is on the crest of the jersey, and the dominant color is red.

Central Division

- Carolina Hurricanes: 1979 Hartford Whalers jerseys, the team's first season after the NHL–WHA merger when they were the Whalers, in gray instead of white.
- Chicago Blackhawks: 1940 throwbacks, with the white base switched to black, and the vintage roundel logo (not worn on the white jersey until 1951) in place of the player numbers worn on the front of the original sweater.
- Columbus Blue Jackets: 2000 throwbacks, the team's inaugural season, except red.
- Dallas Stars: 1999 throwbacks, when they won the Stanley Cup, except white throughout, including the pants, trimmed in victory green and black, and featuring silver on the logos.
- Detroit Red Wings: 1998 throwbacks based on the red uniforms in which they hoisted their ninth (and second consecutive) Stanley Cup, but in white (resembling their pre-1956 white jerseys) with silver stripes inspired by their Centennial Classic uniforms.
- Florida Panthers: 1996 throwbacks, when they made their only Stanley Cup Final appearance, using the team's current color scheme, and in navy blue instead of the original red, resembling their first navy jerseys from 1998.
- Nashville Predators: 1998 throwbacks, the team's inaugural season, in gold instead of navy.
- Tampa Bay Lightning: 2004 throwbacks, when they won their first Stanley Cup, but now blue.

North Division

- Calgary Flames: The team's first third jersey in 1998, but black throughout.
- Edmonton Oilers: 1979 throwbacks, the team's first season after the NHL–WHA merger, with the orange and blue trim reversed, paying homage to the original 1972 Alberta Oilers.
- Montreal Canadiens: 1976 throwbacks, except the blue and red are reversed.
- Ottawa Senators: 1992 throwbacks, the team's inaugural season, but now red.
- Toronto Maple Leafs: 1970 throwbacks, originally colored with white accents, but now gray, the 1967–1970 logo is on the crest of the jersey.
- Vancouver Canucks: The team's third jersey in 2001, originally colored with red gradients, but now green.
- Winnipeg Jets: The 1979 jerseys of the original Winnipeg Jets, the team's first season after the NHL–WHA merger, except now a dark gray base with navy blue accents.

East Division

- Boston Bruins: primarily "gold"-color throwback jerseys, with details matching those of the 1987–88 and 1989–90 seasons, when the team reached two Stanley Cup Final over a three-season span.
- Buffalo Sabres: The team's first third jersey in 2000, except done in the team's current colors and on a white template.
- New Jersey Devils: 1982 throwbacks, the team's first season in New Jersey after relocating from Denver when they were the Colorado Rockies, except the green and red are reversed.
- New York Islanders: 1980 throwbacks, when they won the first out of four consecutive Stanley Cups in the navy blue focused color scheme the team used from 1995 to 2010.
- New York Rangers: 1996 alternate jerseys that feature the head of the Statue of Liberty, but navy blue throughout.
- Philadelphia Flyers: 1995 throwbacks, when Eric Lindros won the Hart Memorial Trophy, similar but the black and white elements are swapped out for one another.
- Pittsburgh Penguins: 1997 throwbacks featuring the serifed word "PITTSBURGH" arranged diagonally, when Mario Lemieux won his sixth scoring title, except white instead of black, and with the triangle-less skating penguin logo on the shoulders in place of the 1992 "robopenguin" logo.
- Washington Capitals: 1997 throwbacks, featuring the "screaming eagle", except done in their current color scheme.

== Milestones ==
=== First games ===
The following is a list of notable players who played their first NHL game during the 2020–21 season, listed with their first team.

Player	Team	Notability
Cole Caufield	Montreal Canadiens	Lady Byng Memorial Trophy winner, one-time NHL All-Star team selection
Kirill Kaprizov	Minnesota Wild	2020–21 Calder Memorial Trophy winner, three-time NHL All-Star, NHL All-Rookie Team selection
Alexis Lafreniere	New York Rangers	First overall pick in the 2020 draft
Ilya Sorokin	New York Islanders	One-time NHL All-Star team selection, one-time NHL All-Star
Jeremy Swayman	Boston Bruins	William M. Jennings Trophy winner, one-time NHL All-Star, NHL All-Rookie Team selection
Logan Thompson	Vegas Golden Knights	One-time NHL All-Star team selection, one-time NHL All-Star

=== Last games ===
The following is a list of players of note who played their last NHL game in 2020–21, listed with their team:

Player	Team	Notability
Devan Dubnyk	Colorado Avalanche	Bill Masterton Memorial Trophy winner, one-time NHL All-Star team selection, three-time NHL All-Star
Matiss Kivlenieks	Columbus Blue Jackets	Died on July 4, 2021, after a fireworks accident
Mikko Koivu	Columbus Blue Jackets	Over 1,000 games played, one-time NHL All-Star
Patrick Marleau	San Jose Sharks	All-time leader in games played (1,779), three-time NHL All-Star
Ryan Miller	Anaheim Ducks	Vezina Trophy winner, one-time NHL All-Star team selection, one-time NHL All-Star, led all American-born goaltenders in wins (391) at retirement
Pekka Rinne	Nashville Predators	Hockey Hall of Fame inductee, Vezina Trophy winner, King Clancy Memorial Trophy winner, two-time NHL All-Star team selection, four-time NHL All-Star, scored a goal in 2020, led all Finnish-born goaltenders in games played (683), wins (369), and shutouts (60) at retirement
Shea Weber	Montreal Canadiens	Hockey Hall of Fame inductee, over 1,000 games played, Mark Messier Leadership Award winner, four-time NHL All-Star team selection, seven-time NHL All-Star
Travis Zajac	New York Islanders	Over 1,000 games played

=== Major milestones reached ===
- On January 14, 2021, Minnesota Wild forward Kirill Kaprizov became the first player in NHL history to have three-plus points and an overtime goal in his debut.
- On January 28, 2021, New Jersey Devils head coach Lindy Ruff became the seventh head coach to coach 1,500 games.
- On February 2, 2021, Montreal Canadiens defenseman Shea Weber played his 1,000th NHL game, becoming the 349th player to reach the mark.
- On February 6, 2021, New York Islanders goaltender Semyon Varlamov became the 76th goaltender to play 500 games.
- On February 20, 2021, Pittsburgh Penguins forward Sidney Crosby played his 1,000th NHL game, becoming the 350th player to reach the mark.
- On February 21, 2021, New Jersey Devils forward Travis Zajac played his 1,000th NHL game, becoming the 351st player to reach the mark.
- On March 7, 2021, Florida Panthers defenseman Keith Yandle played his 1,000th NHL game, becoming the 352nd player to reach the mark.
- On March 9, 2021, Chicago Blackhawks forward Patrick Kane played his 1,000th NHL game, becoming the 353rd player to reach the mark.
- On March 17, 2021, New York Rangers forward Mika Zibanejad tied a modern NHL record for most points in one period with six, set by Bryan Trottier in 1978. On March 25, Zibanejad also became the first player in NHL history to score six or more points in consecutive games against one opponent, recording six points on two separate occasions against Philadelphia.
- On March 27, 2021, Florida Panthers defenseman Keith Yandle played his 900th consecutive NHL game, becoming the third player to reach the mark, as well as the first American and first defenseman.
- On April 10, 2021, Toronto Maple Leafs goaltender Jack Campbell set an NHL record with his 11th consecutive win to start a season.
- On April 12, 2021, Carolina Hurricanes forward Jordan Staal played his 1,000th NHL game, becoming the 354th player to reach the mark. Additionally, Staal joined his brother Eric as the sixth pair of brothers in NHL history to each record 1,000 games. (Note: After Derian and Kevin Hatcher, Mikko and Saku Koivu, Rob and Scott Niedermayer, Daniel and Henrik Sedin, and Brent and Ron Sutter.)
- On April 13, 2021, Calgary Flames forward Milan Lucic played his 1,000th NHL game, becoming the 355th player to reach the mark.
- On April 15, 2021, Boston Bruins goaltender Tuukka Rask recorded his 300th win, becoming the 37th goaltender to reach the mark.
- On April 15, 2021, Washington Capitals forward Nicklas Backstrom played his 1,000th NHL game, becoming the 356th player to reach the mark.
- On April 19, 2021, San Jose Sharks forward Patrick Marleau played his 1,768th NHL game, becoming the all-time leader in games played and surpassing the record previously held by Gordie Howe.
- On April 21, 2021, San Jose Sharks forward Patrick Marleau played his 900th consecutive NHL game, becoming the fourth player to reach the mark.
- On April 25, 2021, Washington Capitals defenseman Zdeno Chara played his 1,600th NHL game, becoming the 13th player to reach the mark.
- On May 5, 2021, Los Angeles Kings forward Anze Kopitar recorded his 1,000th NHL point, becoming the 91st player to reach the mark.
- On May 8, 2021, Edmonton Oilers forward Connor McDavid recorded his 100th point of the season in his 53rd game, becoming the ninth player to reach the mark in that short of a timespan and the first since Mario Lemieux and Jaromir Jagr did so in 1995–96.
- On May 8, 2021, Arizona Coyotes forward Phil Kessel played his 900th consecutive NHL game, becoming the fifth player to reach the mark.
- On May 11, 2021, Winnipeg Jets forward Paul Stastny played his 1,000th NHL game, becoming the 357th player to reach the mark.
- On May 23, 2021, Washington Capitals defenseman Zdeno Chara played his 200th NHL playoff game, becoming the 23rd player to reach the mark.

== Broadcast rights ==
=== National ===
==== Canada ====
This was the seventh season of the league's 12-year Canadian national broadcast rights deal with Sportsnet. This included Sportsnet's sub-licensing agreements to air Hockey Night in Canada games on CBC Television and French-language broadcasts on TVA Sports. As a result of the league's temporary realignment, HNIC and Wednesday Night Hockey only aired all-Canadian regular season games, and the Sunday-night Hometown Hockey broadcasts were temporarily suspended.

==== United States ====
This was the tenth and final season of NBC Sports' U.S. national media rights to the NHL, and its 16th consecutive season overall as rightsholder. On January 22, 2021, it was reported that NBCUniversal would shut down NBCSN—the main U.S. cable broadcaster of the NHL—by the end of the year, with its programming to be subsumed by USA Network and its streaming service Peacock.

NBC dropped out of negotiations for the new NHL media contracts, with Sports Business Journal reporting that NBC had offered less than US$100 million per-season (roughly half the value of its existing contract) for a package centred upon Peacock, and "never was aggressive in pursuing a renewal". The NHL divided its next round of media rights between ESPN/ABC and Turner Sports, both under seven-year contracts that take effect in the 2021–22 season.

NHL Network began to air its first original game telecasts (as opposed to simulcasts from regional networks), NHL Network Showcase, on February 6, 2021. The inaugural season featured 16 weekend afternoon games through the remainder of the season. Modeled after the similarly named broadcasts on sister channel MLB Network, the games are called by Stephen Nelson and rotating analysts. They are drawn from the "European Game of the Week" package, which had been introduced in the 2018–19 season to provide opportunities for primetime NHL broadcasts by European rightsholders; with the introduction of original broadcasts for the window, the NHL Network Showcase feed is being repackaged for distribution as a world feed in Europe.

=== Local ===
- On October 6, 2020, TSN3 announced that it had renewed its regional rights to the Winnipeg Jets under a multi-year deal.
- On January 7, 2021, Sportsnet West announced that it had renewed its regional rights to both the Calgary Flames and Edmonton Oilers under a multi-year deal.
- On January 26, 2021, the Seattle Kraken announced that Root Sports Northwest would be their regional television broadcaster when the expansion team begins play in 2021–22.
- On January 27, 2021, Sinclair Broadcast Group announced the upcoming rebranding of Fox Sports Networks (which owns regional rights to 14 of the NHL's 32 teams) as Bally Sports, as part of a sponsorship agreement with casino operator Bally's Corporation. The rebrand took place March 31 to coincide with Opening Day of the 2021 Major League Baseball season.

=== Radio ===
- The NHL's national radio contract (NHL Radio) changed hands from NBC Sports Radio (as part of its exit from terrestrial broadcasting) to Sports USA, initially as part of a one-year agreement.
- On October 5, 2020, the Winnipeg Jets announced that Corus Entertainment would assume the team's radio rights under a seven-year deal. 680 CJOB and 97.5 CJKR-FM serve as co-flagships, both replacing 1290 CFRW. It marked the first time Winnipeg's NHL team aired on CJOB, since the original Winnipeg Jets. CFRW ceased operating as a sports radio station on February 5, 2021, switching to a comedy format.
- The San Jose Sharks ended their radio relationship with 98.5 KUFX and shifted to online-only audio broadcasts.

=== Personnel ===
Harnarayan Singh, after spending the previous decade calling games in the Punjabi language for Hockey Night in Canada, made his English play-by-play debut this season working HNIC games in Alberta.

After the retirement of Mike Emrick, the lead play-by-play position for the NHL on NBC was rotated between Kenny Albert and John Forslund during the regular season. Albert eventually assumed the lead role during the 2021 Stanley Cup Final.

In January 2021, it was announced that Sportsnet commentator Dave Randorf would become the new play-by-play announcer for the Tampa Bay Lightning on Bally Sports Sun, succeeding Rick Peckham.

Pittsburgh Penguins radio play-by-play announcer Mike Lange retired following the season. Lange, the voice of the Penguins for 46 seasons, only called four home games towards the end of the season, including two playoff games, with designated successor Josh Getzoff calling a majority of the games.

=== Impact of COVID-19 on production ===
For most regular season games, the home team's regional rightsholder served as the host broadcaster, providing a neutral "world feed" to the away team's local rightsholder and other media partners, which was then overlaid with remote commentary. NBC also used the world feed during its non-exclusive telecasts, with its commentators working remotely from NBC Sports' studios in Stamford, Connecticut, but had its own crews on-site for its exclusive broadcasts (including Wednesday Night Hockey and games on the NBC broadcast network). A similar arrangement was used in Canada by Sportsnet, TSN, TVA Sports, and RDS, based primarily on their respective national and regional rights, with Sportsnet producing Calgary, Edmonton, Vancouver, and half of Toronto's games, TSN producing Ottawa, Winnipeg, and half of Toronto's games, and RDS and TVA Sports splitting Montreal. TSN and Sportsnet's respective parent companies Bell Media and Rogers Media jointly own Dome Productions, which provides the broadcast facilities for both networks.

For its exclusive Hockey Night in Canada and Wednesday Night Hockey national broadcasts, Sportsnet either used its regular national production crews or its local Calgary, Edmonton, Toronto, or Vancouver production crews. Sportsnet also suspended production of its remote Hometown Hockey broadcasts. To further reduce travel during the regular season, Sportsnet/HNIC's lead play-by-play announcer Jim Hughson opted to only call national Vancouver home games (and would ultimately retire after the conclusion of the season), and Chris Cuthbert (who joined Sportsnet from TSN during the suspension of play) mostly worked games in Eastern Canada.

== See also ==
- 2020–21 NHL transactions
- List of 2020–21 NHL Three Star Awards
- 2020–21 NHL suspensions and fines
- 2020 in sports
- 2021 in sports
- COVID-19 pandemic in Canada
- COVID-19 pandemic in the United States
- Impact of the COVID-19 pandemic on sports
