= Mike Barnett (ice hockey) =

Canadian ice hockey executive (born 1948)

Michael Barnett
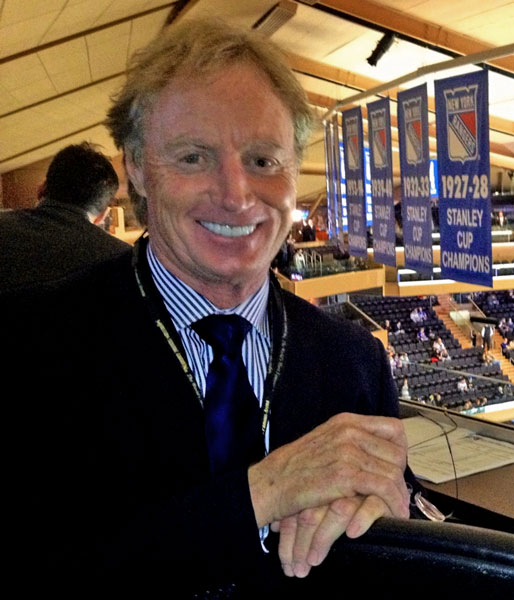
- Barnett in 2014
- Born: October 9, 1948 (age 77); Olds, Alberta, Canada
- Education: St. Lawrence University (1970); University of Calgary (1973)
- Occupation: Sports executive

Michael G. Barnett (born October 9, 1948) is a Canadian ice hockey executive currently serving as Senior Advisor to the President-General Manager of the New York Rangers.

Barnett was the former agent of sports icon Wayne Gretzky for two decades. He was listed among the "100 Most Powerful People In Sports" by The Sporting News on six occasions from 1994 to 2000.

Barnett served as President of International Management Group's hockey division for twelve years, representing various players of the National Hockey League.

Barnett was considered one of the central figures in finalizing the NHL's Collective Bargaining Agreement of 1994.

Barnett made a significant career shift, where after two decades as a player agent, he served as the general manager of the Phoenix Coyotes from 2001 to 2007.

== Personal life ==
Barnett grew up in Western Canada, before attending St. Lawrence University in Canton, New York, on a hockey scholarship.

He later attended the University of Calgary in his home province of Alberta. He was a two sport collegiate athlete in both football and hockey.

Barnett played with the Chicago Cougars and Houston Aeros organizations of the World Hockey Association, playing career ended due to an eye injury in 1975.

Barnett's son, JT Barnett, played five years in the Western Hockey League before turning pro with the Ontario Reign in 2013–2014.

== Career ==
Following his playing career, Barnett and long time hockey agent Gus Badali created Sierra Sports Group.

Barnett formed his own sports management company in 1982, CorpSport International, based in Edmonton, Alberta. Modeled after Mark McCormack's International Management Group, CorpSport became the Canadian industry leader in representing a wide variety of Canada's top athletes and public figures.

In 1988, Barnett merged CorpSport International with IMG, where he ran the Los Angeles office. Over the course of his twelve years with IMG, Barnett rose to International Vice-president.

In August 2001, Barnett left IMG and the athlete representation business to join the Phoenix Coyotes as the team's general manager.

In his first year as General Manager, the team established their best record in franchise's history.

Barnett oversaw a tear down of the team, phasing out aging veterans in favor of building a young core centred around Shane Doan, Keith Yandle and Martin Hanzal.

IBarnett was named to the management of Team Canada at the World Hockey Championships in May 2006.

Barnett was relieved of his duties as General Manager of the Coyotes in April 2007, after the team's point totals kept gradually regressing.

Barnett joined the New York Rangers, as Senior Advisor to the President-General Manager, Glen Sather following his dismissal from the Coyotes.

== Marketing, Representation and Contracts ==
Upon his relocation to Los Angeles in 1988 as president of IMG Hockey, Barnett grew the division into one of the leading hockey representation companies in the NHL. Carefully hand choosing IMG staffers, former players and executives from the NHLPA, IMG Hockey under Barnett had nine full-time agents in five countries who annually represented a half dozen first round NHL draft picks. A staple of Barnett's presidency with IMG Hockey was their annual visit to the local Children's Hospital on the eve of the NHL draft in whichever city it was being held. The IMG agents and their fifteen to twenty draft prospects would spend the Friday night handing out NHL merchandise to hospitalized kids. The annual event was not for publicity purposes, rather it was closed to the media and made available only to the children, their families and the IMG Hockey group. Several of Barnett's IMG colleagues have gone on to be recognized as leaders in their field, notably Pat Brisson, Claes Elefalk and J.P. Barry, who later moved from IMG to CAA.

During the NHL's 1994 lockout, Gretzky decided to put a team together and barnstorm Europe (Ninety Nine All Stars Tour), much like Babe Ruth had done decades before. Barnett was in charge of the eight game schedule and all of the tours logistics. With the support of IMG's Scandinavian office, the tour was an overwhelming success, selling out Europe's biggest arenas before Gretzky and Friends had even departed America. As General Manager of the Ninety Nine All Stars, Barnett arranged for youth hockey clinics in each European city, utilizing the NHL stars. Giving back to the community was forever a hallmark of the Gretzky-Barnett relationship, whether it be North America or beyond. With nine NHL Hall-Of-Famers in the lineup (Gretzky, Messier, Hull, Yzerman, Federov, Coffey, Fuhr, Blake, MacInnis), Barnett arranged for the live television rights to be sold to Canada's CBC Network.

Barnett's ideas were not limited to the hockey world; In 1990, Barnett took his concept for an animated television series to DIC entertainment in Los Angeles. Not long after, the Saturday morning series ProStars, featuring Michael Jordan, Wayne Gretzky and Bo Jackson, began airing on NBC.

The same year, with IMG's resources behind him and Mark McCormack as his mentor, Barnett developed new business for IMG's golf division. He was instrumental in the creation of The Norman Challenge, a made for television event that pitted Wayne Gretzky, Larry Bird and Ivan Lendl against Greg Norman on the CBS Network. Following its ratings success, IMG took the event to Swedish television using Swedish celebrity athletes. In 1999, Barnett worked with IMG's Executive VP Barry Frank in conceiving Monday Night Golf, which saw Tiger Woods taking on Sergio García under the lights for ABC Sports. Barnett's further involvement in IMG's golf division saw him acting as the agent for PGA Tour Hall of Fame golfer Raymond Floyd.

=== Marketing Wayne Gretzky ===
In the early 1980s, with Gretzky establishing himself as the NHL's best player and the ultimate spokesperson, Barnett and Gretzky designed a plan that would see "The Great One" enter into exclusive endorsement relationships with only blue-chip national and international corporations. There would be no short-term deals, and every relationship would be tied to a third party charity that would benefit from the efforts of Gretzky and the corporation. Gretzky's fame, on and off the ice, combined with Barnett's vision would be a marriage that lasted over two decades.

Despite playing in Edmonton, Alberta, Barnett convinced Canon (in 1983) to create a national billboard campaign that saw Gretzky's Edmonton Oiler image high above Times Square in New York. He also convinced North American contemporary artists Andy Warhol and LeRoy Neiman to release prestigious limited editions of the hockey legend.

Complete with an Edmonton Oilers uniform and accessory sweat suit, Mattel Toys launched the Wayne Gretzky doll.

Canada's longest standing department store chain, Hudson's Bay Company, debuted a Wayne Gretzky section in every store exclusively selling the Gretzky brand of men's clothing for fall, winter and summer.

Rather than see Gretzky endorse an existing cereal brand, Barnett sought a proven company to create Gretzky's own cereal brand. Shortly thereafter, in 1984, General Mills launched ProStars cereal nationally in Canada. It was the first presweetened cereal that used aspartame as a sweetener. The cereal, with the side and back panels all Gretzky related, was popular for many years.

Gretzky was also a long time spokesman for Coca-Cola. In keeping with their long standing mandate of tying in a charity, Barnett worked with Coca-Cola to create the "Coca-Cola Future Stars" hockey camp that annually gave under privileged and mentally handicapped kids the chance to skate with Gretzky and other stars. In 1989, Gretzky appeared in a Coca-Cola commercial that aired during Super Bowl XXIII. It was the first ever US network commercial to air in 3D.

In 1988, Gretzky was traded to the Los Angeles Kings. With Barnett's relocation to Los Angeles, Gretzky's arrival in a major US market took his profile to another level. Hockey itself established a whole new foothold in Southern California. Barnett recognized this growing popularity, along with an absence of ice arenas. Soon, multi million-dollar Wayne Gretzky Roller Hockey Center's began to spring up in California, with youngsters wearing Wayne Gretzky's Ultra Wheels roller hockey equipment.

On the ice, Gretzky switched from Titan's wooden hockey stick to Easton's aluminum model. Barnett convinced Chairman Jim Easton to create a bright, new, chrome aluminum shaft that would be used exclusively by Gretzky in NHL action. Soon after, Easton climbed from 12th to 1st in hockey stick sales.

In his King's jersey, Gretzky also launched on network television, the first ViewCam for Sharp Electronics.

Even more memorable was Gretzky's single line "no!" in the famous Bo Jackson Nike commercial. Barnett and Gretzky worked with Nike from the early 1980s to his last game in the National Hockey League. With Gretzky, Nike broke into the hockey business and created their own line of equipment that sold worldwide. The last pair of skates that Gretzky wore in his final game as a Ranger were the latest Nike model.

In late 1996, Barnett looked towards the Campbell's, who had begun aggressively marketing their Chunky Soup brand in sports. In October 1996, Gretzky became the first person ever to appear on a Campbell's Soup label. Barnett insisted that the "www.gretzky.com" web address be displayed on each one of its first-run 55 million labels.

=== Representation and Contracts ===
In 1992, Barnett and his fellow IMG Hockey agents were representing a significant number of the NHL's biggest names. At Barnett's direction, the rights to those players names, images and likenesses were being held out of the majority of the NHLPA's (National Hockey League Players' Association) group licensing contracts. Upon Bob Goodenow's arrival as the new executive director of the NHLPA, Goodenow took the NHLPA's licensing in-house. Before this change, a significant percentage of NHLPA licensing revenues had been going to an outside, third party licensing company. With the new licensing arrangement, Barnett agreed to include all of IMG's hockey clients in future NHLPA licensing deals. Having IMG's stars on board, the NHLPA's licensing revenues increased monumentally.

During his years at IMG hockey, Barnett negotiated numerous contracts for IMG clients that often created breakthroughs, either economically or creatively or both, which benefitted all NHL players. In 1993, Barnett negotiated a three-year contract with the Los Angeles Kings that would pay Gretzky $25.5 million, an average of $8.5 million per year. The contract made Gretzky the highest paid athlete in all of North American team sports. Anticipating a labor dispute, Barnett structured the majority of the contract in the signing bonus, which saved Gretzky millions of dollars when the NHL ceased operation for a few months in 1994. Signing bonuses, but not salaries, are paid during a strike or lockout. Heavily loaded signing bonuses are now standard in the contracts of all major star athletes.

In 1998, Barnett signed Pittsburgh Penguins Jaromír Jágr, the NHL's best player at the time, to a 6-year, $48 million contract. That contract was the richest in total value and called for the highest annual salary in NHL history - $9.5 million per year over its last four years.

Barnett succeeded in attracting three offer sheets, the most of any NHLPA registered agent to date. In 1993, Barnett convinced the St. Louis Blues to sign Marty McSorley to an offer sheet worth $10 million. The Los Angeles Kings matched the offer, keeping the rights to McSorley. The contract then put McSorley ahead in salary of NHL all-star defensemen Chris Chelios, Ray Bourque and Al MacInnis.

In August 1997, the Toronto Maple Leafs presented an offer sheet to Swedish defenseman Mattias Öhlund, an unsigned 1994 first-round pick of the Vancouver Canucks. Barnett had forced Vancouver to match, paying Öhlund $10 million total, with a $7.5 million signing bonus. It was several times greater than the Canucks original offer to Öhlund.

In February 1998, Barnett secured an offer sheet from the Carolina Hurricanes for Sergei Federov of the Detroit Red Wings. The $38 million, 6-year deal was appropriate for Federov, who had helped the Red Wings win the Stanley Cup in 1997. A provision in the contract that Barnett created stated that Federov's $28 million signing bonus would be due in full if his team was to play in the Conference Final. Carolina was in last place at the time, while Detroit was in first. The Red Wings matched the offer, keeping the rights to Federov. Five months later, the Red Wings were forced to pay the total $28 million signing bonus when the team won the Western Conference. The NHL filed a grievance in opposition to Barnett's provision, but an NHL arbitrator ruled in favor of Federov and Barnett.

Barnett also argued on behalf of other high first-round picks in the NHL Draft. In 1997, it was widely believed that the Boston Bruins would select Joe Thornton with the #1 overall pick. When the Bruins drafted him with the first selection, Barnett convinced the team to agree to a completely new contract format for entry-level players. The contract, often still referred to as the "Thornton model", forever changed rookie contracts in the NHL. Every first-round pick after Thornton used the model. It became a standard understanding between player agents and NHL teams that the Thornton model would be required in order to sign top draft picks.

In 1999, the Sedin twins, Daniel and Henrik, from Sweden were entering the NHL Draft, both rated in the first round. The twins desire to play together in North America meant that they had to be drafted by the same team. Barnett worked directly with Vancouver Canucks General Manager, Brian Burke, together convincing all other NHL teams to pass on both twins. This allowed Vancouver to draft the Sedin's at #2 and #3. Daniel and Henrik Sedin have been the core of the Vancouver Canucks offense since that day.

Preceded by Cliff Fletcher	General Manager of the Phoenix Coyotes; 2001–2007	Succeeded by Don Maloney
