= Choyce =

Choyce is a surname. Notable people with the surname include:

- John Choyce (1930–1999), Canadian ice hockey coach
- Lesley Choyce (born 1951), Canadian writer and publisher

== See also ==
- Choyce Point, headland in the Antarctic Peninsula
- Milne & Choyce, department store in Auckland, New Zealand
