= Ninety Nine All Stars Tour =

1994 Ice hockey tour

The Ninety Nine All Stars Tour was a tour of ice hockey exhibition games where the Ninety Nine All Stars team toured five countries during the 1994–95 NHL lockout. It was formed by Wayne Gretzky, IMG and some of Gretzky's personal friends.

The purpose of the tour was to stay in shape during the lockout, raise money for charities and to promote ice hockey around the world. The team played a total of eight games in five countries, six against professional club teams and two against national All Star teams. The Ninety Nine All Stars were, indeed, truly all stars; as of 2022, eleven players from the team have been inducted into the Hockey Hall of Fame.

In the first game, held at the Palace of Auburn Hills against the IHL's Detroit Vipers, the Ninety-Nines wore white NHLPA jerseys with black trim, as worn during a preceding series of NHLPA exhibition games. For the games in Europe, the team wore uniforms based upon the Detroit Red Wings' 1991–92 throwback uniform, themselves based upon the 1927–28 Detroit Cougars white uniforms with red stripes, but with the word "DETROIT" on the front wide stripe replaced with a cursive "Ninety Nine".

== Ninety Nine All Stars Roster ==
Note: # denotes later inducted into Hockey Hall of Fame

Note: C denotes Co-Captain

Goalies

- Grant Fuhr#
- Kelly Hrudey

Defensemen

- Rob Blake#
- Paul Coffey#
- Todd Gill
- Charlie Huddy
- Al MacInnis#
- Marty McSorley

Forwards

- Pat Conacher
- Russ Courtnall
- Sergei Fedorov#
- Doug Gilmour#
- Tony Granato
- Wayne Gretzky# C
- Brett Hull#
- Jari Kurri#
- Steve Larmer
- Mark Messier# C
- Kirk Muller
- Warren Rychel
- Rick Tocchet
- Steve Yzerman#

Coaches

- Doug Wilson (head coach)
- Walter Gretzky (assistant coach)
- Mike Barnett (General Manager)
- Claes Elefalk (Tour Coordinator)

== List of games ==
- December 1, 1994: 3-4 loss vs Detroit Vipers (IHL)
  - Steve Yzerman, Sergei Fedorov, and Paul Coffey, all from the Detroit Red Wings, did not appear in this game. Future NHL star Miroslav Satan scored the winning goal for the Vipers.
- December 3, 1994: 7-1 win vs Jokerit (Finland)
- December 4, 1994: 3-4 OT loss vs Ilves Tampere (Finland)
- December 6, 1994: 6-3 win vs Norwegian Spectrum All Stars (Norway)
- December 9, 1994: 8-3 win vs Djurgårdens IF (Sweden)
- December 10, 1994: 5-2 win vs Västra Frölunda HC (Sweden)
- December 12, 1994: 5-6 OT loss vs Malmö IF (Sweden)
- December 14, 1994: 8-5 win vs German All Stars in Freiburg (Germany)

== See also ==
- List of international games played by NHL teams
- List of international ice hockey competitions featuring NHL players
