= Meghan Chayka =

Canadian data scientist and ice hockey analyst

- Born: c. 1984 (age 41–42); Windsor, Ontario, Canada
- Education: Brock University, McMaster University
- Occupations: Entrepreneur; data scientist; ice hockey analyst
- Years active: 2010–present
- Known for: Co-founder of Stathletes
- Relatives: John Chayka (brother)

Meghan Chayka (born c. 1984) is a Canadian data scientist and co-founder of the ice hockey analytics firm Stathletes.

== Career ==
Chayka worked as a financial analyst at the Ministry of Transportation of Ontario and as an analyst at John Deere before shifting to focus entirely on sport analysis in the mid-2010s.

She is a Data Scientist in Residence at the Rotman School of Management at the University of Toronto, a position she has held since 2017.

=== Stathletes ===
Chayka's first venture into ice hockey statistics came in 2009 when she and friend Neil Lane began filming her younger brother John's games while he was playing junior ice hockey in the Ontario Junior Hockey League (OJHL), with the aim of analysing the collected data to help him improve his game. They developed a method of video analysis that produced dramatically more points of statistical data than contemporary methodologies.

After John's hockey career was ended by injury, he identified the potential marketability of Chayka and Lane's method of video analysis, which eventually grew into the founding of Stathletes by the Chaykas and Lane in 2010. The company grew quickly and, in 2012, the Vancouver Canucks became the first National Hockey League (NHL) team to employ their services.

Chayka has used her position within the company to champion the growth of women's ice hockey and Stathletes has become an industry leader in analytics for the women's game. Statistical data and analysis generated by Stathletes were used by the CBC's for its broadcasts of the women's ice hockey tournament at the 2018 Winter Olympics and the women's ice hockey tournament at the 2022 Winter Olympics. Chayka spearheaded the landmark partnership between Stathletes and the National Women's Hockey League (PHF since 2021) to provide analytics for the 2020–21 NWHL season.

A regular participant in academic conferences, she has spoken at a number of analytics and sports conferences, including at the 2020 MIT Sloan Sports Analytics Conference and the inaugural Women's Hockey Analytics Conference.

During the first year of the COVID-19 pandemic in Canada, Chayka joined forces with Alison Lukan to present Hockey Analytics Night in Canada (HANIC), a regular online conference intended to bring together and spark discussion within the ice hockey analytics community via diverse topics and speakers.

Chayka joined the Sabres Hockey Network in 2025 as part of the Buffalo Sabres' agreement with Stathletes, with Chayka appearing as a studio analyst for select games.

== Awards and honours ==
Chayka was named the Ontario Chamber of Commerce's Top Young Entrepreneur of the Year in 2018. In 2019, she was named to both the George Brown College's The 5 to Watch for Sports Business Executives and The Hockey News' Top 100 People of Power and Influence.

Chayka appeared on The Athletic's Top Forty Under 40 in both 2019 and 2020, and Sportsnet's 25 Most Powerful Women in Hockey 2022. She was identified by The Hockey News as one of twenty candidates with the credentials to become the first woman to serve as a general manager in the NHL.

Alongside Melody Davidson and Sami Jo Small, Chayka was selected as an honorary coach for the 2022 PHF All-Star Showcase.

== Personal life ==
Chayka holds both an Honours in Business Administration (HBA) and a master's degree in economics from McMaster University and a BBA in finance from the Goodman School of Business at Brock University.

Her younger brother, John Chayka, is the current general manager of the Toronto Maple Leafs and was previously the general manager of the Arizona Coyotes from 2016 to 2020.
