= Steve Sullivan =

Canadian ice hockey player

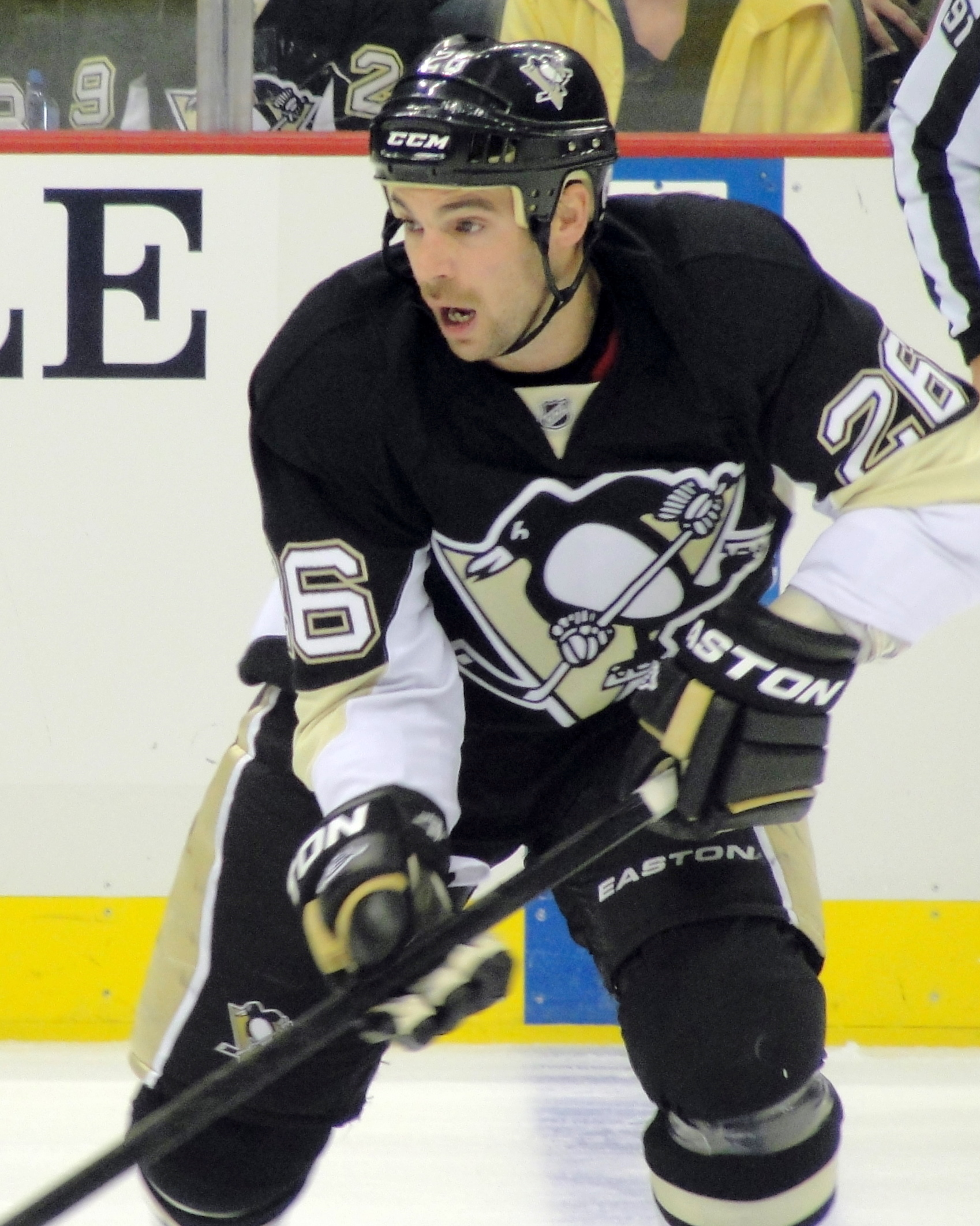
- Sullivan with the Pittsburgh Penguins in 2011
- Born: July 6, 1974 (age 52) Timmins, Ontario, Canada
- Height: 5 ft 9 in (175 cm)
- Weight: 156 lb (71 kg; 11 st 2 lb)
- Position: Left wing
- Shot: Right
- Played for: New Jersey Devils; Toronto Maple Leafs; Chicago Blackhawks; Nashville Predators; Pittsburgh Penguins; Phoenix Coyotes
- National team: Canada
- NHL draft: 233rd overall, 1994; New Jersey Devils
- Playing career: 1994–2013

Steve Sullivan (born July 6, 1974), nicknamed "Timmins Tornado", is a Canadian former professional ice hockey player who played over 1000 games in the National Hockey League (NHL) for the New Jersey Devils, Toronto Maple Leafs, Chicago Blackhawks, Nashville Predators, Pittsburgh Penguins and Arizona Coyotes. He was also a former coach and executive with the Coyotes.

== Early life ==
Sullivan was born on July 6, 1974, in Timmins, Ontario to parents Kenn and Louise. Growing up, Sullivan and his older brother Gary attended École secondaire catholique Thériault.

== Playing career ==
=== Early years ===
After being cut from the Sault Ste. Marie Greyhounds training camp, Sullivan joined the Tier II Jr. A Timmins Golden Bears for the 1991–92 season. Sullivan later admitted that this was the right choice because he had not been prepared to play at the OHL level. He finished the 1991–92 season fourth in the Tier II league with 66 goals and 121 points. As such, he began to attract attention from NCAA Division I hockey programs Michigan Tech University and Ferris State University. However, after choosing to play in the Greyhounds' 1992 exhibition games, he forfeited his NCAA eligibility. Sullivan subsequently spent the entirety of the 1992–93 season with the Greyhounds and ranked sixth in team scoring with 36 goals and 27 assists despite playing on the fourth line. His 63 points tied him for second among all rookie scorers. After the Greyhounds finished the regular season as the Emms Division champions, Sullivan was named to the OHL's second rookie all-star team.

After the Greyhounds swept the Peterborough Petes in the 1993 OHL playoffs, Sullivan was scratched for the first two games of their Emms Division semifinal series against Owen Sound in order to rest.

=== New Jersey Devils ===
Following the 1993–94 season, Sullivan was drafted in the ninth round of the 1994 NHL entry draft by the New Jersey Devils. Sullivan was expected to rejoin the Greyhounds for his overage season but unexpectedly signed a two-way contract with the Devils and their American Hockey League (AHL) affiliate, the Albany River Rats. Greyhounds general manager later stated that the loss of Sullivan taught the team a "big lesson" about planning for the future. After recording his first professional hat-trick, Sullivan ended the 1994 calendar year leading all AHL rookies in scoring with 19 goals and 21 assists. Albany's head coach Robbie Ftorek praised Sullivan for his playmaking skills and Devils scout David Conte described him as a player who could "put points on the board." As a result of his early success, Sullivan was selected to participate in the 1995 AHL All-Star Game. He finished the regular-season with 32 goals and 84 points to help the River Rats qualify for the 1994 Calder Cup playoffs. He also finished second in Rookie of the Year voting. Sullivan then scored nine goals and 16 assists to help the team clinch the 1995 Calder Cup championship.

Sullivan scored his first NHL goal in his NHL debut on February 23, 1996, against the Montreal Canadiens. He was then briefly reassigned to the minors, where he recorded a hat trick and set a franchise record for most points in a single game. Sullivan was recalled to the NHL in March after two Devils players were injured. He then scored in his next two NHL games while playing with wingers Reid Simpson and Randy McKay. Sullivan credited his easy transition to the NHL level to Devils head coach Jacques Lemaire and the team's similar style to the River Rats. By the end of March, Sullivan had tallied five goals through 12 games. Sullivan returned to the River Rats on April 15 after the Devils failed to qualify for the 1996 Stanley Cup playoffs. Despite spending most of the second half of the 1995–96 season with the Devils, Sullivan ranked third in scoring on the River Rats with 75 points. He was also named to the AHL's 1995–96 First All-Star Team.

During the Devils' 1996 training camp, Sullivan suffered a groin injury that was misdiagnosed as a pulled hip flexor. He was placed on the team's injured reserve list on October 4 and reassigned to the River Rats on October 14. He recorded eight goals and seven assists through 15 AHL games before being recalled to the NHL level on November 1. However, Sullivan began suffering from anxiety and a loss of confidence while playing with the Devils due to his slow start and frequent scratches. He tallied one goal and four assists through his first 10 games but struggled to find a balance between anxiety and anticipation. In January, Lemaire moved Sullivan from centre onto the left wing of Bobby Holik and Dave Andreychuk because of his short stature. In their first three games together, Sullivan tallied two assists and a game-winning goal.

=== Toronto Maple Leafs ===
On February 25, 1997, Sullivan was traded to the Toronto Maple Leafs along with defenceman Jason Smith and the playing rights to Alyn McCauley in exchange for Doug Gilmour, Dave Ellett, and a third-round draft pick. At the time of the trade, Sullivan had scored eight goals and 14 assists in 33 games. Upon joining the Leafs, Sullivan returned to his natural centre position and played between Tie Domi and Wendel Clark. Domi later compared Sullivan to Theoren Fleury and praised his tenacious playing style. While he recorded six points in his first six games with the Leafs, head coach Mike Murphy expressed his disappointment with Sullivan's lack of "spark" and urged him to play harder. Sullivan was recognized as the NHL's Rookie of the Month after finishing March leading all rookies with four goals and seven assists through 14 games. He finished the regular season with five goals and 11 assists through the Leafs' final 21 games.

Over the offseason, Sullivan reviewed old game footage of himself while he played for the Devils to regain his intensity. He also took responsibility for his inconsistent play the previous season, stating: "I learned a lot from sitting out last year...I took things personally. I put the blame on Mike Murphy when the blame should have been on me." As a restricted free agent, Sullivan signed a one-year contract with the Maple Leafs on September 12, 1998. However, after reinjuring his hip flexors during the preseason, Sullivan was scratched for four of the first five games of the 1998–99 season. While he continued to be scratched throughout October and November due to mediocre play, Sullivan voiced his opinion that this was due to a bias against smaller players in the NHL. Sullivan recorded four goals in the Leafs 9–1 win over the Florida Panthers on April 10, 1999. He tied a Panthers franchise record for most goals scored against them in a single game and reached the 20-goal plateau for the first time in his NHL career. Sullivan missed the last four games of the Leafs first round series against the Pittsburgh Penguins due to back spasms but returned to the lineup for their second round against the Buffalo Sabres.

=== Chicago Blackhawks ===
After requesting a trade, the Toronto Maple Leafs placed Sullivan on waivers on October 23, 1999. This was an option for the Maple Leafs because the NHL required teams to waive one player if they signed another team's free agent after the September deadline. Upon joining the Blackhawks, Sullivan was given the jersey number 15 as his usual jersey number was already taken. However, after struggling to score, he requested a change to his junior team jersey number. After the Blackhawks acquired Michael Nylander in late November, the two spent the majority of the season together. In their first game together on December 3, Nylander scored four goals, and Sullivan assisted on three.

On April 14, 2000, Sullivan was one of 14 players named to Team Canada's roster for the 2000 IIHF World Championship. Sullivan recorded his second career NHL hat-trick on December 22, 2000, against the Vancouver Canucks. His time in Chicago might be best remembered for an incident during a game in Denver against the Colorado Avalanche when a fan mocked Sullivan after the player suffered a cut across the nose caused by an inadvertent stick to his face. That fan was eventually hit in the head by a puck that Avalanche goalie Patrick Roy cleared, leading to a retort from Sullivan.

=== Nashville Predators ===
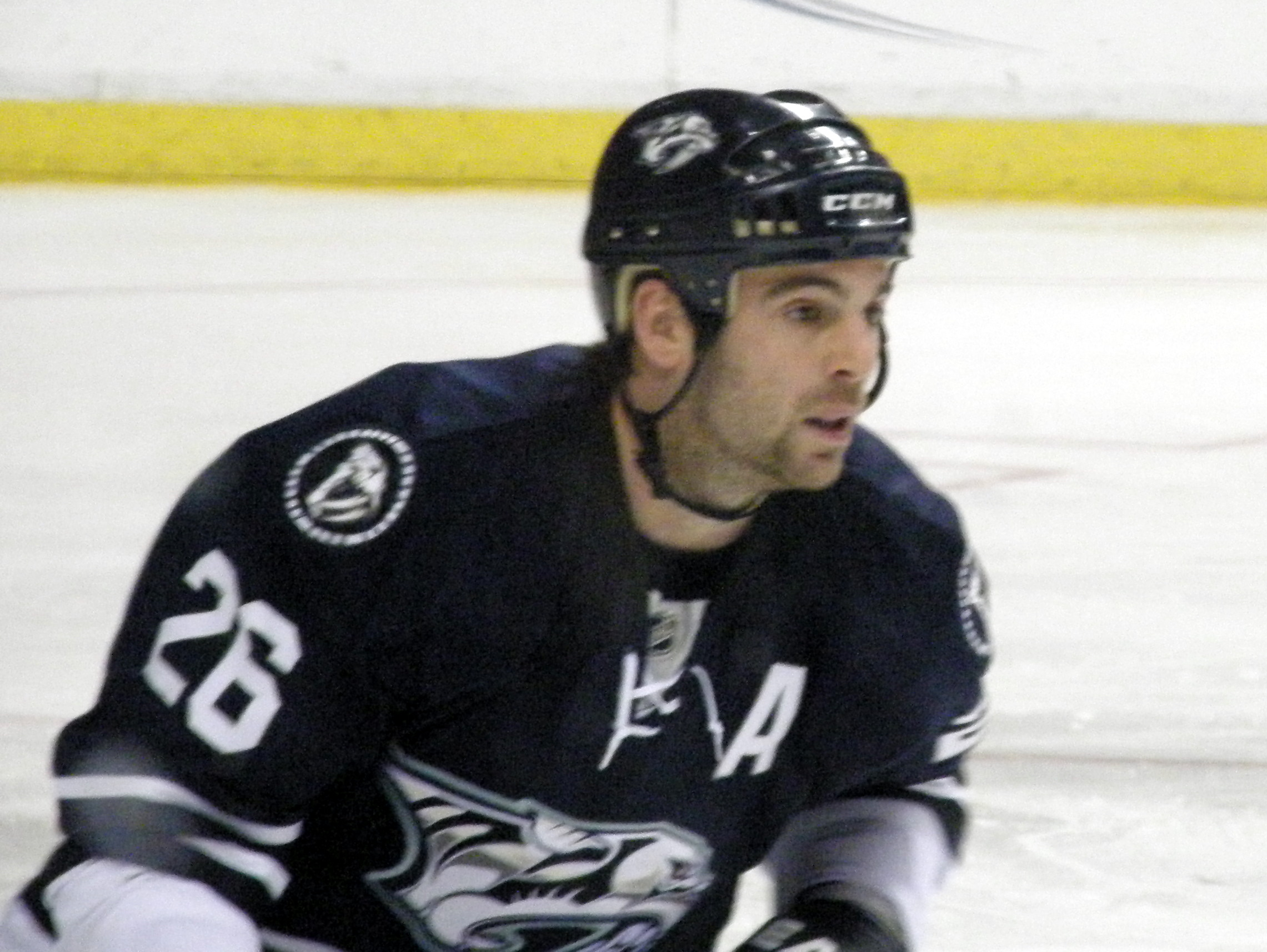
Sullivan with the Predators in 2010.

Sullivan was traded to the Nashville Predators for second-round picks in the 2004 and 2005 NHL entry drafts on February 16, 2004. At the time, he had recorded 15 goals and 28 assists through 56 games. Sullivan recorded a hat trick in his first game with the Predators, and tallied 10 points in his first three games with the team. As a result, he was named the NHL's Offensive Player of the Week for October 9–16, 2005.

In February 2007, Sullivan suffered a debilitating back injury in a game against the Montreal Canadiens that forced him out of action for the remainder of the 2006–07 season, all of the 2007–08 season, and the first half of the 2008–09 season. Sullivan made his comeback on January 10, 2009, against the Chicago Blackhawks after nearly 23 months. Due to his successful comeback during the 2008–09 season, Sullivan was awarded the Bill Masterton Memorial Trophy for his perseverance, sportsmanship, and dedication to hockey.

=== Pittsburgh Penguins ===
On July 1, 2011, he signed a one-year contract worth $1.5 million with the Pittsburgh Penguins. His early form in the 2011–12 season was disappointing, but as the season went on, he became better accustomed to the Penguins' lineup and finished with 48 points in 79 games. He scored two goals in the Penguins opening round playoff loss to the Philadelphia Flyers.

=== Final NHL season ===
On July 4, 2012, Sullivan signed a one-year, $1.85 million deal with the Phoenix Coyotes. Signed with the intention to cover the loss of fellow veteran Ray Whitney, Sullivan got off to a quick start with the Coyotes in the lockout shortened 2012–13 season, scoring a hat-trick in his third game to help defeat the Columbus Blue Jackets on January 24, 2013. On March 28, 2013, Sullivan dressed for his 1,000th NHL game. He was honored during the game as the Coyotes defeated the Predators 7–4.

On April 3, 2013, Sullivan was dealt by the Coyotes at the trade deadline to return to his original club, the New Jersey Devils, for a 7th-round draft pick. His time between stints with the Devils was 16 years and 45 days, the third longest amount of time between stints with one team in NHL history.

== Post-playing career ==
On September 8, 2014, the Coyotes announced they had hired Sullivan as their development coach. He was promoted to director of player development on May 26, 2016, and one year later he was promoted to assistant general manager.

On July 26, 2020, Sullivan was named the interim general manager of the Coyotes upon the resignation of John Chayka, running the NHL franchise until Bill Armstrong was hired as the new general manager in September 2020. Less than five months later, Sullivan was let go from this position as assistant general manager and executive vice-president of hockey operations on February 11, 2021.

In August 2024, Sullivan joined the Toronto Maple Leafs' AHL affiliate, the Toronto Marlies, as an assistant coach.

Sullivan was hired by the Toronto Maple Leafs as an assistant coach on December 26, 2025, replacing the fired Marc Savard.

Sullivan was hired by the Toronto Marlies as their head coach on July 22, 2026.

== Personal life ==
Sullivan and his wife Kristen have four children together. During his time with the Toronto Maple Leafs, color commentator Harry Neale nicknamed Sullivan the "Timmins Tornado."

== Career statistics ==
=== Regular season and playoffs ===
			Regular season					Playoffs
Season	Team	League	GP	G	A	Pts	PIM	GP	G	A	Pts	PIM
1991–92	Timmins Golden Bears	NOJHL	47	66	55	121	141	—	—	—	—	—
1992–93	Sault Ste. Marie Greyhounds	OHL	62	36	27	63	44	16	3	8	11	18
1992–93	Sault Ste. Marie Greyhounds	MC	—	—	—	—	—	4	1	0	1	4
1993–94	Sault Ste. Marie Greyhounds	OHL	63	51	62	113	82	14	9	16	25	22
1994–95	Albany River Rats	AHL	75	31	50	81	124	14	4	7	11	10
1995–96	Albany River Rats	AHL	53	33	42	75	127	4	3	0	3	6
1995–96	New Jersey Devils	NHL	16	5	4	9	8	—	—	—	—	—
1996–97	Albany River Rats	AHL	15	8	7	15	16	—	—	—	—	—
1996–97	New Jersey Devils	NHL	33	8	14	22	14	—	—	—	—	—
1996–97	Toronto Maple Leafs	NHL	21	5	11	16	23	—	—	—	—	—
1997–98	Toronto Maple Leafs	NHL	63	10	18	28	40	—	—	—	—	—
1998–99	Toronto Maple Leafs	NHL	63	20	20	40	28	13	3	3	6	14
1999–2000	Toronto Maple Leafs	NHL	7	0	1	1	4	—	—	—	—	—
1999–2000	Chicago Blackhawks	NHL	73	22	42	64	52	—	—	—	—	—
2000–01	Chicago Blackhawks	NHL	81	34	41	75	54	—	—	—	—	—
2001–02	Chicago Blackhawks	NHL	78	21	39	60	67	5	1	0	1	2
2002–03	Chicago Blackhawks	NHL	82	26	35	61	42	—	—	—	—	—
2003–04	Chicago Blackhawks	NHL	56	15	28	43	36	—	—	—	—	—
2003–04	Nashville Predators	NHL	24	9	21	30	12	6	1	1	2	6
2005–06	Nashville Predators	NHL	69	31	37	68	50	5	0	2	2	0
2006–07	Nashville Predators	NHL	57	22	38	60	20	—	—	—	—	—
2008–09	Nashville Predators	NHL	41	11	21	32	30	—	—	—	—	—
2009–10	Nashville Predators	NHL	82	17	34	51	35	6	0	3	3	2
2010–11	Nashville Predators	NHL	44	10	12	22	28	9	2	1	3	2
2011–12	Pittsburgh Penguins	NHL	79	17	31	48	20	6	2	4	6	4
2012–13	Phoenix Coyotes	NHL	33	5	7	12	20	—	—	—	—	—
2012–13	New Jersey Devils	NHL	9	2	3	5	4	—	—	—	—	—
NHL totals			1,011	290	457	747	587	50	9	14	23	30

=== International ===
Year	Team	Event	GP	G	A	Pts	PIM
2000	Canada	WC	9	4	1	5	14
2001	Canada	WC	7	1	2	3	10
Senior totals			16	5	3	8	24

Preceded by Jason Blake	Bill Masterton Memorial Trophy; 2009	Succeeded by Jose Theodore
Preceded by John Chayka	General Manager of the Arizona Coyotes (interim); 2020	Succeeded by Bill Armstrong
