= Bill Armstrong (ice hockey, born 1970) =

Canadian ice hockey player and executive (born 1970)

- Born: May 18, 1970 (age 56) Richmond Hill, Ontario, Canada
- Height: 6 ft 5 in (196 cm)
- Weight: 220 lb (100 kg; 15 st 10 lb)
- Position: Defence
- Shot: Left
- Played for: AHL; Hershey Bears; Providence Bruins; IHL; Cleveland Lumberjacks
- NHL draft: 46th overall, 1990; Philadelphia Flyers
- Playing career: 1990–1999

William C. Armstrong (born May 18, 1970) is a Canadian former professional ice hockey defenceman currently serving as general manager of the Utah Mammoth of the National Hockey League (NHL).

== Career ==
Playing junior ice hockey for the Oshawa Generals, Armstrong scored the winning goal in double overtime of the 1990 Memorial Cup final.

Armstrong played nine seasons in the American Hockey League (AHL) and the International Hockey League (IHL) and served as head coach for the AHL's Providence Bruins and ECHL's Trenton Titans, both for two seasons. He was previously the St. Louis Blues' assistant general manager and director of amateur scouting.

In September 2020, Armstrong was hired to be the general manager for the Arizona Coyotes, going on to sign a multi-year extension in September 2023.

== Career statistics ==
			Regular season					Playoffs
Season	Team	League	GP	G	A	Pts	PIM	GP	G	A	Pts	PIM
1987–88	Toronto Marlboros	OHL	64	1	10	11	99	4	0	0	0	0
1988–89	Toronto Marlboros	OHL	64	1	16	17	82	6	0	2	2	6
1989–90	Hamilton Dukes	OHL	18	0	2	2	38	—	—	—	—	—
1989–90	Niagara Falls Thunder	OHL	4	0	1	1	13	—	—	—	—	—
1989–90	Oshawa Generals	OHL	41	2	8	10	115	17	1	7	7	39
1990–91	Hershey Bears	AHL	56	1	9	10	117	—	—	—	—	—
1991–92	Hershey Bears	AHL	80	2	14	16	159	3	0	0	0	2
1992–93	Hershey Bears	AHL	80	2	10	12	205	—	—	—	—	—
1993–94	Providence Bruins	AHL	66	0	7	7	200	—	—	—	—	—
1994–95	Providence Bruins	AHL	75	3	10	13	244	13	0	2	2	8
1995–96	Cleveland Lumberjacks	IHL	63	1	3	4	183	3	0	0	0	2
1996–97	Providence Bruins	AHL	13	1	1	2	71	10	0	1	1	26
1996–97	Cleveland Lumberjacks	IHL	41	0	6	6	91	—	—	—	—	—
1997–98	Providence Bruins	AHL	63	0	4	4	141	—	—	—	—	—
1998–99	Providence Bruins	AHL	6	0	0	0	32	—	—	—	—	—
AHL totals			439	9	55	64	1169	26	0	3	3	36
IHL totals			104	1	9	10	274	3	0	0	0	2

Preceded by Peter Laviolette	Head Coach of the Providence Bruins; 2000–02	Succeeded by Mike Sullivan
Preceded by Steve Sullivan (interim)	General Manager of the Arizona Coyotes; 2020–2024	Vacant Team suspended
New title	General Manager of the Utah Mammoth; 2024–present	Incumbent
