= Don Maloney =

Canadian ice hockey player and executive

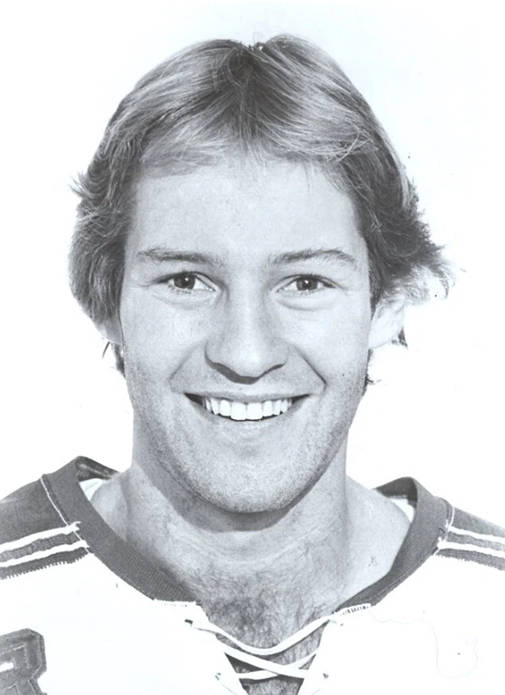
- Born: September 5, 1958 (age 68) Lindsay, Ontario, Canada
- Height: 6 ft 1 in (185 cm)
- Weight: 190 lb (86 kg; 13 st 8 lb)
- Position: Left wing
- Shot: Left
- Played for: New York Rangers; Hartford Whalers; New York Islanders
- National team: Canada
- NHL draft: 26th overall, 1978; New York Rangers
- Playing career: 1978–1991

Donald Michael Maloney (born September 5, 1958) is a Canadian ice hockey executive and former player, currently serving as president of hockey operations of the Calgary Flames. He was formerly the general manager of the New York Islanders and Phoenix/Arizona Coyotes. He played for the New York Rangers for parts of eleven seasons. In addition, he played with his brother Dave Maloney while with the Rangers.

Don was selected as the 26th player in the 1978 NHL Amateur Draft. Brother Dave was a summer instructor at the Orr-Walton Sports Camp when Don was drafted by the Rangers.

== Playing career ==
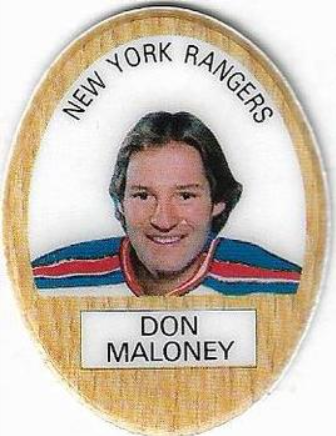
Maloney sticker

Maloney was traded to the Hartford Whalers during the 1988–89 season. He also played for the Rangers' perennial rivals, the New York Islanders, from 1989 to 1991.

He was named MVP of the 36th National Hockey League All-Star Game held in Brendan Byrne Arena in East Rutherford, on January 31, 1984.

== Post-playing career ==
He served as the Islanders' general manager from 1992 to 1995. Maloney served as the Rangers' vice president of player personnel and was also as assistant general manager to first Neil Smith and then Glen Sather from 1996 to 2007. On May 28, 2007, he was named general manager of the Phoenix Coyotes.

In the 2009 book 100 Ranger Greats, the authors ranked Maloney at No. 26 all-time of the 901 New York Rangers who had played during the team's first 82 seasons.

On June 2, 2010, Maloney was named the NHL's General Manager of the Year, making him the first ever recipient of the award.

At the conclusion of the 2015–16 season, the Arizona Coyotes relieved Maloney of his duties as general manager.

On August 17, 2016, Maloney was hired as a professional scout for the Calgary Flames.

On April 17, 2023, Maloney was promoted to president of hockey operations for the Flames, assuming the role of interim general manager after the departure of Brad Treliving. Maloney was then succeeded as permanent general manager by Craig Conroy on May 23, 2023.

== Career statistics ==
=== Regular season and playoffs ===
			Regular season					Playoffs
Season	Team	League	GP	G	A	Pts	PIM	GP	G	A	Pts	PIM
1974–75	Kitchener Greenshirts	WWJHL	—	—	—	—	—	—	—	—	—	—
1974–75	Kitchener Rangers	OMJHL	5	1	3	4	0	—	—	—	—	—
1975–76	Kitchener Rangers	OMJHL	61	27	41	68	132	5	3	1	4	9
1976–77	Kitchener Rangers	OMJHL	38	22	34	56	126	—	—	—	—	—
1977–78	Kitchener Rangers	OMJHL	62	30	74	104	143	9	4	9	13	40
1978–79	New York Rangers	NHL	28	9	17	26	39	18	7	13	20	19
1978–79	New Haven Nighthawks	AHL	38	18	26	44	62	—	—	—	—	—
1979–80	New York Rangers	NHL	79	25	48	73	97	9	0	4	4	10
1980–81	New York Rangers	NHL	61	29	23	52	99	13	1	6	7	13
1981–82	New York Rangers	NHL	54	22	36	58	73	10	5	5	10	10
1982–83	New York Rangers	NHL	78	29	40	69	88	5	0	1	1	0
1983–84	New York Rangers	NHL	79	24	42	66	62	5	1	4	5	0
1984–85	New York Rangers	NHL	37	11	16	27	32	3	4	0	4	2
1985–86	New York Rangers	NHL	68	11	17	28	56	16	2	1	3	31
1986–87	New York Rangers	NHL	72	19	38	57	117	6	2	1	3	6
1987–88	New York Rangers	NHL	66	12	21	33	60	—	—	—	—	—
1988–89	New York Rangers	NHL	31	4	9	13	16	—	—	—	—	—
1988–89	Hartford Whalers	NHL	21	3	11	14	23	4	0	0	0	8
1989–90	New York Islanders	NHL	79	16	27	43	47	5	0	0	0	2
1990–91	New York Islanders	NHL	12	0	5	5	6	—	—	—	—	—
NHL totals			765	214	350	564	815	94	22	35	57	101

=== International ===
Year	Team	Event	GP	G	A	Pts	PIM
1985	Canada	WC	8	1	1	2	—

Sporting positions
Preceded by Bill Torrey	General manager of the New York Islanders; 1992–1995	Succeeded by Darcy Regier
Preceded by Mike Barnett	General manager of the Phoenix/Arizona Coyotes; 2007–2016	Succeeded by John Chayka
Preceded by Brad Treliving	General Manager of the Calgary Flames (Interim); 2023	Succeeded by Craig Conroy
