= John Ferguson Jr. =

- Born: July 7, 1967 (age 59) Montreal, Quebec, Canada
- Height: 6 ft 0 in (183 cm)
- Weight: 200 lb (91 kg; 14 st 4 lb)
- Position: Left wing
- Shot: Left
- Played for: New Haven Senators (AHL); Fredericton Canadiens (AHL); Peoria Rivermen (IHL)
- NHL draft: 247th overall, 1985; Montreal Canadiens
- Playing career: 1989–1993

John Ferguson Jr. (born July 7, 1967) is the current assistant general manager for the Utah Mammoth of the National Hockey League (NHL). Ferguson previously served as the director of player personnel for the Boston Bruins and the general manager of their American Hockey League affiliate, the Providence Bruins. Ferguson previously was the vice president and general manager for the Toronto Maple Leafs from 2003 to 2008.

== Playing career ==
Drafted by the Montreal Canadiens, the team with which his father had played every one of his NHL games, in the 12th round of the 1985 NHL entry draft, Ferguson played four professional seasons at the American Hockey League (AHL) level with the Canadiens and Senators organizations. He was alternate captain of the 1992 Fredericton Canadiens that won the AHL regular season championship. Ferguson was named the team's "unsung hero" in consecutive years (1991, 1992).

He played his college hockey at Providence College, where he served as an assistant captain, was an Academic All-American and graduated magna cum laude with a degree in business administration in 1989.

== Post-playing career ==
Ferguson was a player agent responsible for negotiating player contracts, product endorsements and player recruitment. From 1993 to 1996 he was a member of the Ottawa Senators scouting staff as an amateur and professional scout. During that time he also spent the summers of 1994 and 1995 at the NHL office in the hockey operations and legal departments.

Following his professional hockey career, he graduated cum laude with the degree of juris doctor from the Suffolk University Law School and was admitted to the Massachusetts State Bar in 1996.

=== St. Louis Blues ===
Ferguson served as vice president and director of hockey operations for the St. Louis Blues, and before that he was assistant general manager for the club for five seasons. In that role he evaluated players at the professional and amateur level and negotiated player contracts. Ferguson was also the president and general manager of the Worcester IceCats and was influential in the negotiation and acquisition of the Blues' top minor league affiliate. He is a former chairman of the AHL's Competition Committee and also served on the league's Legal Affairs Committee.

=== Toronto Maple Leafs ===
On August 29, 2003, at the age of 36, Ferguson became the 12th general manager of the Toronto Maple Leafs. He succeeded Pat Quinn, who retained his duties as head coach after serving in a dual capacity for the previous four seasons. Leafs President Ken Dryden was given a seat on MLSE's board of directors and shuffled to the post of Vice-Chairman, where he was no longer in the Leafs management reporting hierarchy.

During the 2005–06 season, the first after lockout, the Leafs narrowly missed the postseason. Quinn took the blame from the MLSE front office for the team's failure to make the playoffs and was let go as head coach. Quinn's firing upset some longtime Leaf fans, with many calling for the firing of Ferguson himself. The Leafs had finished the season 9-1-2 despite season-ending injuries to Eric Lindros, Jason Allison, Alex Khavanov and Ed Belfour, with TSN criticising Ferguson for signing these players. Many of the young players, who were key contributors to the Leaf's late-season run for a playoff spot, were drafted by Quinn prior to Ferguson's arrival.

Ferguson also drew criticism for a trade which brought Mark Bell to the Leafs. Bell was convicted for a hit and run and driving under the influence while with the San Jose Sharks; the NHL (which wanted to crack down on off-ice behavior) suspended Bell for his first fifteen Leafs games.

Entering the 2007–08 season the Leafs had posted a .577 points percentage during Ferguson's tenure, establishing franchise records for points (103), wins (45-tie), home wins (26) and road wins (23) in a season. The team lost to the Philadelphia Flyers in the first round of the 2003 playoffs, in seven games, and were again eliminated by the Flyers in 2004, in six games during the second round. The Leafs reached at least 90 points and 40 wins in each of the three seasons played. However, the team failed to qualify for the playoffs in the last two of the four seasons under Ferguson. The team was out of a playoff position at the time of his dismissal, near the bottom of the league.

After weeks of media speculation, on January 22, 2008, Ferguson was informed his Leafs' contract would not be renewed when it expired on June 30, 2008. He was relieved immediately from his duties as general manager, and was replaced by returning former Maple Leafs GM Cliff Fletcher. Ferguson was criticized for failing to prepare the Leafs for the salary cap era.

=== Team Canada ===
In 2007 Ferguson served as a member of Team Canada management at the 2007 IIHF World Championship in Russia. He collaborated with Steve Yzerman in selecting Canada's unbeaten gold medal roster, the youngest team to ever win a World Championship.

=== After the Leafs ===
At the 2007–08 NHL Season's trade deadline, Ferguson provided analysis of the trades as they came in for TSN. From 2008 to 2014, he served as a scout for the San Jose Sharks of the NHL. On June 26, 2014, he joined the Boston Bruins as Executive Director of Player Personnel. On September 16, 2016, he was also given the position of general manager of Boston's American Hockey League affiliate, the Providence Bruins.

In 2021, he was hired as the assistant general manager of the Arizona Coyotes and the general manager of their AHL affiliate, the Tucson Roadrunners.

== Personal life ==
Ferguson is married to Providence College graduate, Stephanie Paiva.

Ferguson is the son of former Montreal Canadiens forward John Ferguson, Sr., and was born in the city during his father's tenure with the team.

Preceded by Pat Quinn	General Manager of the Toronto Maple Leafs; 2003–08	Succeeded by Cliff Fletcher (interim)
