= List of Winnipeg Jets (1972–1996) and Arizona Coyotes general managers =

The Arizona Coyotes were an American professional ice hockey team that was based in Phoenix, Arizona, Glendale, Arizona, and later Tempe, Arizona. They played in the Central Division of the Western Conference in the National Hockey League (NHL). The team started out as a charter member of the World Hockey Association (WHA), and were named the Winnipeg Jets. The WHA then merged with the NHL in 1979, the Jets relocated to Phoenix in 1996, and were renamed the Phoenix Coyotes. The franchise had eight general managers.

== Key ==
Key of terms and definitions
Term	Definition
No.	Number of general managers^{[a]}
Ref(s)	References
–	Does not apply
†	Elected to the Hockey Hall of Fame in the Builder category

== General managers ==
General managers of the Arizona Coyotes
No.	Name	Tenure	Accomplishments during this term	Ref(s)
1	John Paddock	July 1, 1996 – December 11, 1996	No playoff appearances	
2	Bobby Smith	December 11, 1996 – February 17, 2001	4 playoff appearances	
3	Cliff Fletcher†	February 17, 2001 – August 28, 2001	No playoff appearances	
4	Mike Barnett	August 28, 2001 – April 11, 2007	1 playoff appearance	
5	Don Maloney	May 29, 2007 – April 11, 2016	Won General Manager of the Year Award (2009–10); 1 division title and 3 playoff appearances	
6	John Chayka	May 5, 2016 – July 26, 2020	No playoff appearances	
7	Steve Sullivan	July 26, 2020 – September 16, 2020	1 playoff appearance	
8	Bill Armstrong	September 16, 2020 – April 18, 2024	No playoff appearances	

== See also ==
- List of NHL general managers

== Notes ==
- ^{a} A running total of the number of general managers of the franchise. Thus any general manager who has two or more separate terms as general manager is only counted once.
