= Cliff Fletcher =

Canadian ice hockey manager (1935–2026)

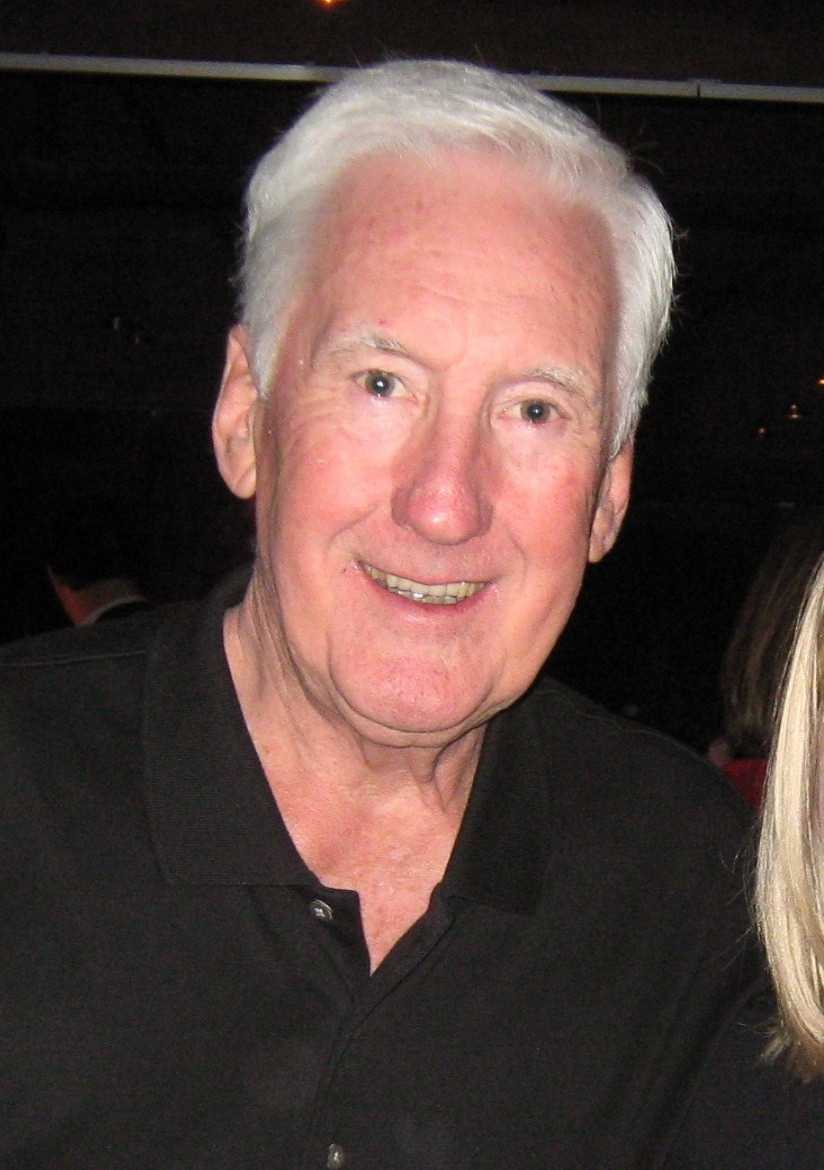
- Fletcher in 2009
- Born: George Clifford Fletcher; August 16, 1935; Montreal, Quebec, Canada
- Died: June 5, 2026 (aged 90); Scottsdale, Arizona, U.S.
- Occupations: National Hockey League executive and general manager
- Children: 2, including Chuck
- Awards: Hockey Hall of Fame (2004)

George Clifford Fletcher (August 16, 1935 – June 5, 2026), professionally known as Cliff Fletcher, was a Canadian National Hockey League executive. During an eight-decade long career which began as a scout in 1956, he served several roles including as general manager of the Atlanta Flames/Calgary Flames, Toronto Maple Leafs, and Phoenix Coyotes in the 1970s–2000s. During his time as general manager of the Calgary Flames, he led the club to its only Stanley Cup championship. He last served as a senior advisor to the Maple Leafs, holding the role at the time of his death. A notable figure in the hockey community, he was elected to the Hockey Hall of Fame in 2004.

A couple of the nicknames he went by are "The Silver Fox" and "Trader Cliff".

== Career ==
=== Early positions ===
Fletcher started his career in 1956 with the Montreal Canadiens as a scout under Sam Pollock, then later became the general manager of the Verdun Blues junior team. He joined the expansion St. Louis Blues in 1966 as a scout for Eastern Canada and worked his way up to the assistant GM position. With Fletcher's help, the Blues advanced to the Stanley Cup Final in each of their first three years, a feat unmatched to this day.

His general manager career started in the Central Hockey League with the Kansas City Blues when he was awarded the top job in January 1971 during a mid-season shake-up that also saw John Choyce appointed as the team's new head coach. In 1972, he accepted the opportunity to run an NHL team when offered the GM position in Atlanta.

=== Flames ===
Fletcher joined the newly minted expansion Atlanta Flames team as general manager, remaining with the Flames in that capacity through and after the team's move to Calgary, Alberta in 1980. Over the next 10 years, he oversaw the Calgary Flames to two Smythe Division titles, two Clarence S. Campbell Bowls as Campbell Conference champions, and two Presidents' Trophies, given to the team with the best NHL regular season record. During his tenure in Calgary, he was the first GM to bring a player from the Soviet Union over when Sergei Priakin played in 1988. The Flames won the Stanley Cup Championship in 1989 against the Montreal Canadiens.

He also served as the GM of Team Canada for the 1981 Canada Cup.

=== Maple Leafs ===
Fletcher moved to the Toronto Maple Leafs in 1991, to serve as chief operating officer, president and general manager. He made a blockbuster trade with Doug Risebrough, his successor as the Flames' General Manager, sending Gary Leeman, Michel Petit, Jeff Reese, Craig Berube, and Alexander Godynyuk to the Flames for Doug Gilmour, Jamie Macoun, Ric Nattress, Rick Wamsley, and Kent Manderville on January 2, 1992. That year, Fletcher also hired Pat Burns as head coach for the upcoming season.

Fletcher's hiring occurred shortly after the death of longtime Leafs' owner Harold Ballard. To his undoubted benefit, unlike Ballard the team's new owners had no desire to meddle in hockey operations, thus giving Fletcher a free hand in managing the team. The positive impact on the Toronto team was immediate. During the 1992–93 season, his second year as GM, the Leafs set team records with wins (44) and points (99), while Gilmour emerged as a superstar and scored a franchise-high 127 points. During the postseason awards ceremony, Gilmour finished as runner-up for the Hart Trophy and won the Frank J. Selke Trophy as best defensive forward, while Burns won the Jack Adams Award as coach of the year; the first major NHL individual awards that Leaf players had won since 1967. Fletcher himself was named as the "Man of the Year" and the "Executive of the Year" by The Hockey News in 1993.

Ultimately, Fletcher did not match the post-season success he enjoyed in Calgary, as the Leafs failed to reach the Stanley Cup Final during his tenure. The Leafs did reach the conference finals in 1993 and 1994 - the only team in the NHL to make it that far in the playoffs in both seasons and the only one of the seven teams from those two years to not make a Stanley Cup Final since expansion.

While favourably received early in his tenure as general manager, the struggles of the Maple Leafs following their two conference finals runs led some media to question Fletcher's ability by the Fall of 1996. He ultimately remained with Toronto for six seasons before retiring to Florida.

=== Lightning ===
In 1999, Fletcher joined the Tampa Bay Lightning as Senior Advisor to the GM for two seasons at the request of Jacques Demers, then Tampa's coach and GM. When Demers left the franchise in 1999, so did Fletcher.

Years later, Demers revealed that he had sought the assistance of Fletcher (as well as that of Jay Feaster) largely on account of his own functional illiteracy, which Demers managed to keep concealed from NHL circles before leaving the game. In his biography, Demers acknowledges that Fletcher and Feaster did most of the work a general manager would normally do because Demers knew he could not do it himself.

=== Coyotes ===
Fletcher joined the Phoenix Coyotes on February 17, 2001, as general manager and executive vice-president. On August 28, 2001, he passed his GM role to Mike Barnett and became senior executive vice-president of hockey operations.

On April 11, 2007, Fletcher and General Manager Mike Barnett were fired after the Coyotes finished the 2006–07 season with their worst record since relocating from Winnipeg to Phoenix in 1996.

=== Return to Toronto ===
Fletcher was officially named the interim general manager of the Toronto Maple Leafs on January 22, 2008, replacing John Ferguson Jr. Fletcher signed a nineteen-month contract with the franchise; serving as GM for six months before becoming an executive for the Maple Leaf Sports & Entertainment organization. He was replaced as GM of the Toronto Maple Leafs by Brian Burke.

Team President Richard Peddie announced that Fletcher would likely be the general manager through the 2008–09 NHL season, although it was later announced on November 27, 2008, that Brian Burke had agreed to a six-year contract as the Maple Leafs' GM. Fletcher served the remainder of his contract with the Maple Leafs as an adviser for the Maple Leafs management team. During the off season of 2009, Fletcher signed a multi-year contract extension.

== Hockey Hall of Fame ==
Fletcher spent 7 years on the Hockey Hall of Fame board of directors and stepped down in 2002. He also spent time on the Hall of Fame selection committee. In 2004, he was selected to the HHOF as a builder and was inducted on November 8, 2004.

== Personal life and death ==
Fletcher's son, Chuck, served as the general manager of the Minnesota Wild from 2009 to 2018 and the Philadelphia Flyers from 2018 to 2024. He also had a daughter.

Fletcher died in Scottsdale, Arizona on June 5, 2026, at the age of 90, as first publicly announced by the Toronto Maple Leafs. He had been working for the organization up until the day he died.

== Sources ==
- "Legends of Hockey - The Legends - Honoured Builder - Fletcher, Cliff - Biography".
- "Building a Franchise Is Fletcher's forte". Archived from the original on October 7, 2008.
- The second time around for Fletcher (Toronto Star article)

Preceded by Position created	General Manager of the Atlanta/Calgary Flames; 1972–91	Succeeded by Doug Risebrough
Preceded by Floyd Smith	General Manager of the Toronto Maple Leafs; 1991–97	Succeeded by Ken Dryden
Preceded by Bobby Smith	General Manager of the Phoenix Coyotes; 2000–01	Succeeded by Mike Barnett
Preceded by John Ferguson, Jr.	Interim General Manager of the Toronto Maple Leafs; 2008	Succeeded by Brian Burke
