= John Choyce =

Canadian ice hockey coach

John Leslie Choyce (November 28, 1930 – January 1999) was a Canadian ice hockey coach. For seven seasons (1971–1980) he was a head coach in the Central Hockey League (CHL).

Choyce started his coaching career with the Kansas City Blues in January 1971 when he was awarded the head coaching position during a mid-season shake-up that also saw Cliff Fletcher appointed as the team's new general manager.

After coaching the CHL's Albuquerque Six-Guns during the 1973-74 season, Choyce was promoted by the NHL expansion Kansas City Scouts to the franchise's director of scouting.

Choyce, who was born in Montreal, Quebec, was named the 1976-77 CHL Coach of the Year and was awarded the Jake Milford Trophy.
