= Jon Lundblad =

Swedish footballer

Personal information
- Date of birth: 19 February 1982 (age 44)
- Place of birth: Örebro, Sweden
- Height: 1.80 m (5 ft 11 in)
- Position: Forward

Senior career*
Years	Team	Apps	(Gls)
1999–2005	Örebro SK		
2006–2007	Reims	17	(2)
2007	Örebro SK	6	(0)
2008–2009	Ljungskile SK		
- * Club domestic league appearances and goals

Jon Lundblad (born 19 February 1982) is a Swedish former professional footballer who played as a forward.
