= Claes Elefalk =

Swedish sports agent

- Born: 1959 (age 66–67); Stockholm, Sweden
- Occupation: Sports agent
- Employer(s): Creative Artists Agency; IMG Artists
- Known for: Sedin Twins, Mats Sundin's & Freddie Ljungberg's agent
- Parent: Ann Elefalk Arne Elefalk
- Website: www.caa.com

Claes Elefalk is a Swedish sports agent at the Creative Artists Agency.

== Career ==
Elefalk is a Swedish Sports agent whose representation include some high-profile athletes. From the early 1990s, Elefalk worked as an agent at IMG Sweden until 2006. He held a vice presidential position within the company before moving to the illustrious Creative Artists Agency and their division CAA Sports. He works out of Creative Artists's Stockholm location.

== Clients ==
Elefalk's clients are mostly ice hockey players usually of Swedish extraction.

=== CAA Sports (Creative Artists Agency) ===
He represents amongst others NHL hockey players Mats Sundin, Filip Forsberg, Daniel Alfredsson, Adrian Kempe, Daniel Sedin, Henrik Sedin, Carl Söderberg, Adam Larsson, Niklas Kronwall, Mario Kempe, Marcus Johansson, Marcus Kruger, Joakim Nordström, Loui Eriksson, Oscar Möller, Mattias Öhlund, Anton Lander, Evgeni Malkin, Victor Rask, Jonathan Davidsson, Victor Söderström, Oliver Kylington, Lucas Wallmark, Alexander Wennberg, Oscar Klefbom, Olli Määttä, Mario Kempe, Andreas Englund, Carl Hagelin, Carl Gunnarsson, Andreas Jämtin, Kenny Jönsson, Jörgen Jönsson, Niclas Bergfors, Mikael Backlund, Mathias Johansson, Carl Grundström, Fabian Brunnström, Carl Söderberg and Per Ledin, .

Elefalk also used to represent soccer players Freddie Ljungberg, Pontus Farnerud, Nils-Eric Johansson, Joel Riddez, Jon Lundblad, and David Beckham.

=== IMG ===
While at IMG, Elefalk represented Brazilian soccer player and former FC Inter Milan coach Leonardo, Australian soccer player Marko Viduka, Nils-Eric Johansson, Martin Dahlin, Anders Limpar, Pascal Simpson, Magnus Pehrsson, Mattias Jonson and Magnus Hedman. as well as Alpine Skiers Patrik Järbyn and Tobias Hellman.
