= John Chayka =

Canadian ice hockey executive (born 1989)

- Born: June 9, 1989 (age 37); Jordan Station, Ontario, Canada
- Occupation: General manager of the Toronto Maple Leafs
- Spouse: Kathryn Chayka
- Relatives: Meghan Chayka (sister)

John Chayka (born June 9, 1989) is a Canadian hockey executive who is currently the general manager of the Toronto Maple Leafs of the National Hockey League (NHL). He was previously the general manager of the Arizona Coyotes. Prior to joining the Coyotes, Chayka was part of an analytics company called Stathletes, and completed his education at the University of Western Ontario's Ivey Business School.

== Career ==
In May 2016, Chayka became the youngest general manager in NHL history, at 26, when he was hired to be the general manager of the Arizona Coyotes. The Coyotes posted a 131–147–38 record under his four seasons as general manager. The franchise also clinched their first playoff berth since 2012 during this period. Chayka abruptly resigned from his position on July 26, 2020, just one day before the start of the 2020 Stanley Cup playoffs, which the Coyotes had qualified for. Arizona expressed displeasure in Chayka's resignation.

Chayka was known for his frequent trades in Arizona. Notable transactions during Chayka's tenure with Arizona included trading for multi-time All-Star Phil Kessel and former MVP Taylor Hall (both in 2019), future All-Star Darcy Kuemper, and trading away the seventh-overall pick in the 2017 NHL draft (for Derek Stepan and Antti Raanta). Media and fan reception to Chayka's moves as general manager were largely mixed, although this is also recognized as a time of great turmoil within the Coyotes franchise, which would suspend operations a few seasons after Chayka's departure.

On January 25, 2021, Chayka was suspended from working in the NHL for the remainder of the 2021 calendar year. NHL Commissioner Gary Bettman cited "conduct detrimental to the league and game", and further ruled that Chayka had "breached his obligation to the club" by pursuing opportunities with other clubs while still under contract with the Arizona Coyotes, and then terminating his contract with three years remaining. Chayka and the Coyotes were later revealed to have hosted a private scouting combine for draft prospects, which is strictly forbidden by the NHL. The Coyotes were subsequently forced to forfeit their second-round selection in the 2020 draft and their first-round pick in the 2021 draft.

On May 3, 2026, Chayka was hired as the general manager of the Toronto Maple Leafs. At the time of his hiring, Chayka was once again the youngest general manager in the NHL. He is the third youngest GM in Maple Leafs history behind Kyle Dubas and Gord Stellick.

Chayka and his wife Kathryn, through their company JKC Restaurants, own 50 Wendy's and 5 Tim Hortons franchises.

Sporting positions
Preceded by Don Maloney	General manager of the Arizona Coyotes; 2016–2020	Succeeded by Steve Sullivan (interim)
Preceded by Ryan Hardy; Brandon Pridham (interim)	General manager of the Toronto Maple Leafs; 2026–present	Incumbent
