= Ryan Callahan =

American ice hockey player (born 1985)

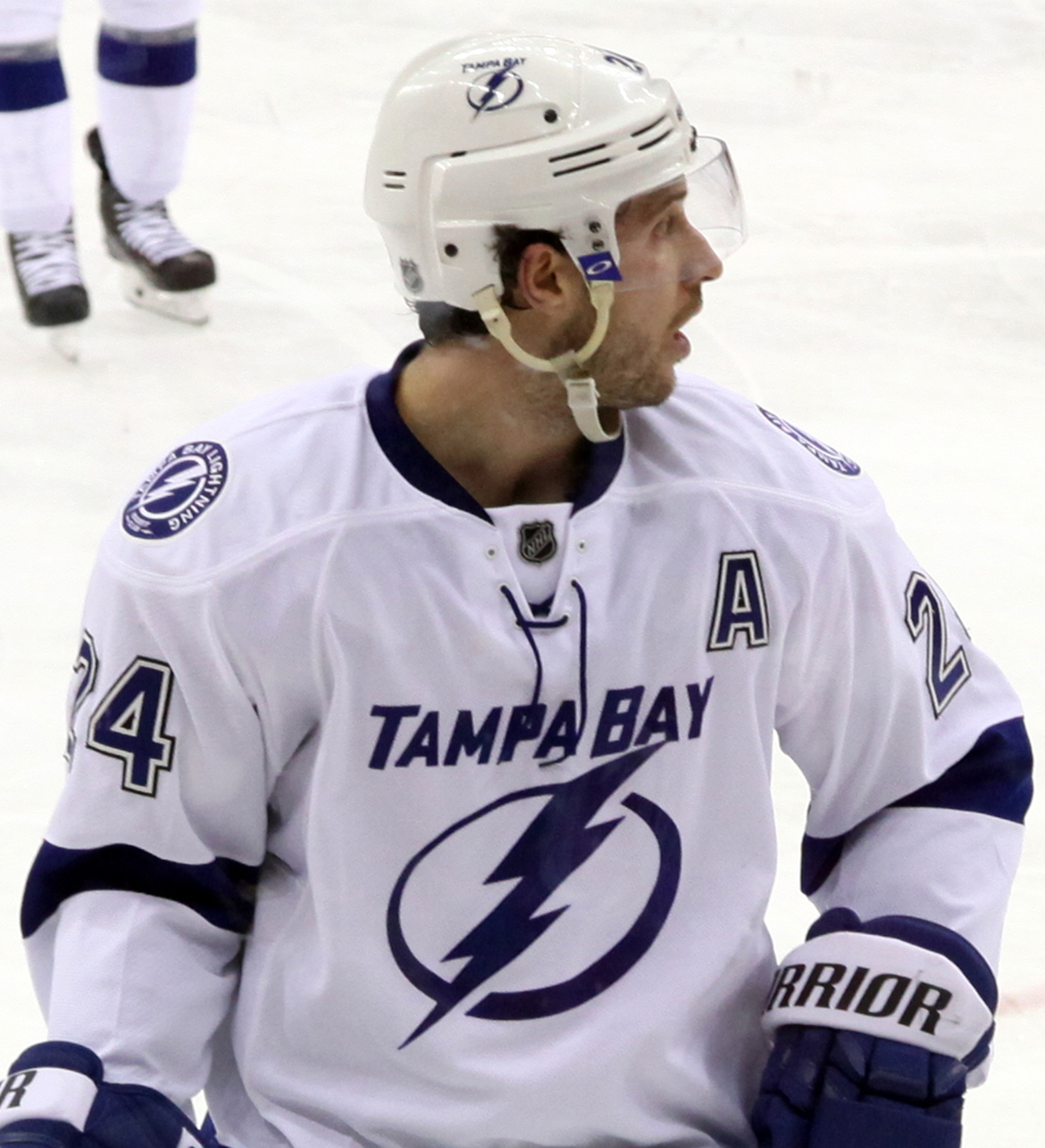
- Callahan with the Tampa Bay Lightning in December 2014
- Born: March 21, 1985 (age 41) Rochester, New York, U.S.
- Height: 5 ft 10 in (178 cm)
- Weight: 186 lb (84 kg; 13 st 4 lb)
- Position: Right wing
- Shot: Right
- Played for: New York Rangers; Tampa Bay Lightning
- National team: United States
- NHL draft: 127th overall, 2004; New York Rangers
- Playing career: 2006–2019

Ryan Callahan (born March 21, 1985) is an American former professional ice hockey right winger who played 13 seasons in the National Hockey League (NHL) with the New York Rangers and the Tampa Bay Lightning. He currently serves as a studio and game analyst for the NHL on ESPN/ABC.

Callahan served as captain of the Rangers from 2011 until he was traded to the Lightning in 2014. Additionally, he has represented the United States in Olympic and international play.

== Playing career ==
=== Amateur ===
Callahan played one year of high school ice hockey for Hilton High School. He then began his junior career with the Rochester Junior Americans of the Empire Junior B Hockey League, where he played for two seasons, 1999 to 2001. After being drafted in the 15th round of the 2001 OHL Priority Selection by the Guelph Storm, Callahan then played with the Syracuse Jr. Crunch and Buffalo Lightning of the OPJHL before moving on to a four-year Ontario Hockey League (OHL) stint with the Storm, where he played alongside future Ranger and Lightning teammate Dan Girardi. Callahan turned professional with the Hartford Wolf Pack of the American Hockey League (AHL), where he played most of the 2006–07 season. On November 16, 2022, it was announced that Callahan's number will be retired by the Guelph Storm in a ceremony commencing on November 19, 2022, during a game against the Kitchener Rangers.

=== New York Rangers ===
Callahan received his first NHL call-up to the Rangers on November 28, 2006, making his NHL debut on December 1, but he would only play in that one game before being sent back down to the Wolf Pack. He was called up for a second time on December 19, but would again only play in one NHL game in that stint. Toward the end of the season, Callahan was called up for the third and final time on March 15, 2007, after scoring 35 goals in 60 AHL games, and he would stay with the Rangers through the 2007 Stanley Cup playoffs. Two days later, on March 17, he scored his first two NHL goals against Joey MacDonald of the Boston Bruins. He scored his first career assist on March 21 and first career game-winning goal on April 1. He scored his first two NHL playoff goals in a 7–0 win in Game 3 of the Eastern Conference Quarterfinal against the Atlanta Thrashers on April 17, 2007.

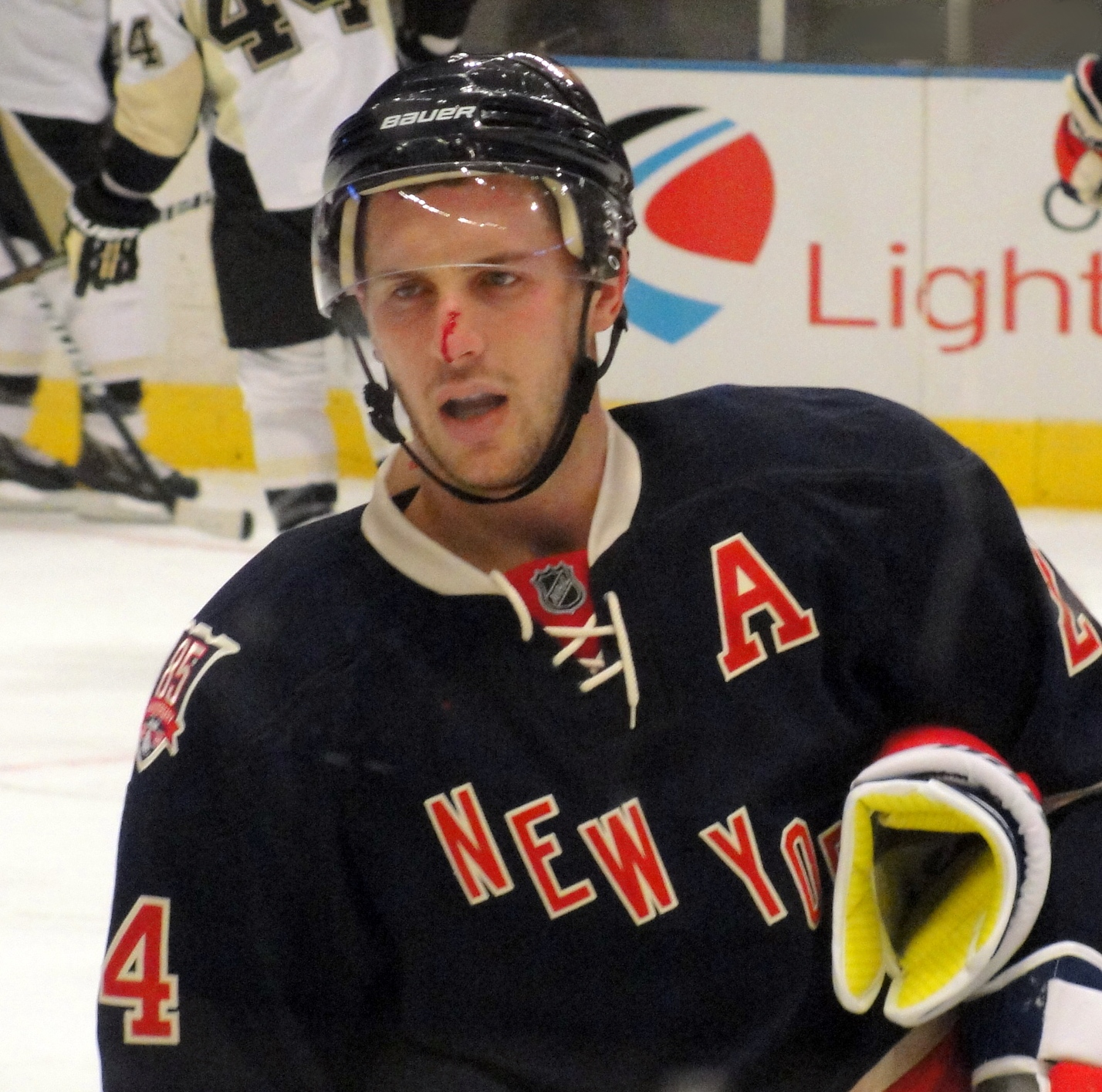
Callahan as an alternate captain for the New York Rangers in February 2011. He was named as an alternate captain in 2009.

After scoring one goal in the first eight games of the 2007–08 season with the Rangers, Callahan was out for a month with a grade two knee sprain. He did not quickly regain his strength at the NHL level, going his next 16 games without a goal, prompting the Rangers to send him back to the Wolf Pack on January 7, 2008. After 11 games in Hartford, he was called up on February 3 to replace an injured Brendan Shanahan in the Rangers' line-up against the Montreal Canadiens. Callahan tallied his second career two-goal game against the San Jose Sharks on February 17.

The following season, 2008–09, was Callahan's breakout year. On October 1, 2008, he scored the game-winning goal for the Rangers with 20 seconds left in the inaugural Victoria Cup; the Rangers defeated Metallurg Magnitogorsk by a 4–3 tally. In the regular season, he was third on the Rangers with 22 goals and fifth on the team with 40 total points. Callahan was also awarded the Rangers' Steven McDonald Extra Effort Award for his hard work throughout the season, and scored the winning goal in the team's playoff-clinching win in the final home game of the season. In the subsequent off-season, on July 13, 2009, Callahan was re-signed by the Rangers.

Callahan was named an alternate captain of the Rangers on October 2, 2009, to begin the 2009–10 season. He suffered a broken hand on December 15, 2010, in Pittsburgh when he blocked a shot. He missed 19 games while recovering.

On March 6, 2011, Callahan scored four goals and one assist as the Rangers beat the Philadelphia Flyers 7–0, simultaneously achieving the first hat-trick, four-goal game and five-point game of his NHL career. He then suffered a broken ankle in the team's 79th game of the season against the Boston Bruins after blocking a Zdeno Chára slapshot in the final minutes.

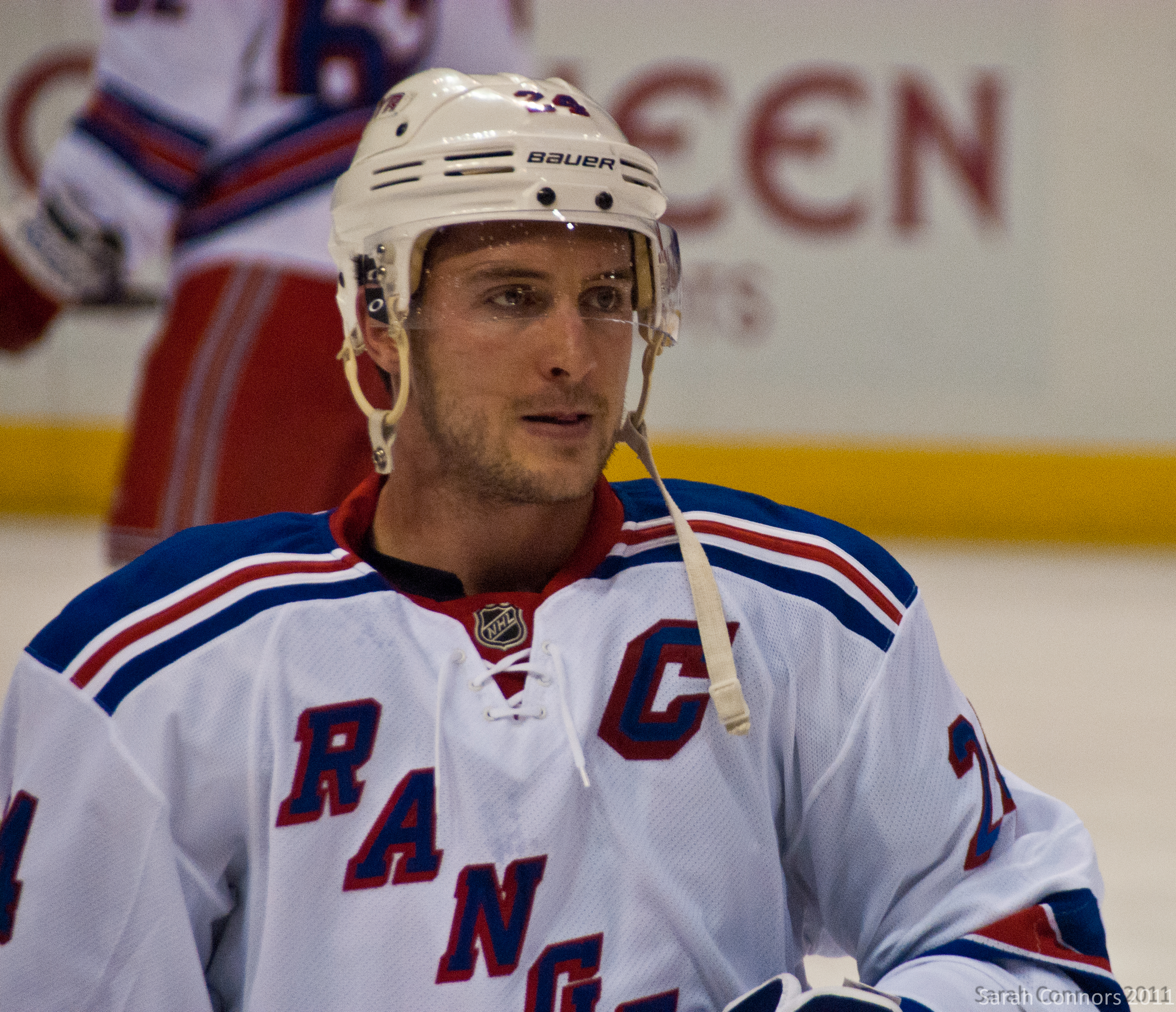
Callahan as captain of the Rangers in December 2011.

On September 12, 2011, at the age of 26, Callahan was named the 26th captain in the history of the New York Rangers. He became the fifth-youngest captain in team history and the first homegrown captain since Brian Leetch in October 1997. Callahan was also the first native of the State of New York to serve as the Rangers' team captain. On February 11, 2012, Callahan scored his second hat-trick against the Philadelphia Flyers.

On February 25, 2012, Callahan scored his 100th career NHL goal, which came in overtime against the Buffalo Sabres at Madison Square Garden. In the 2012 playoffs, he led the Rangers to their first Conference Final appearance since 1997; he also scored the first and last goals of the Rangers post-season as New York eventually fell to the New Jersey Devils in six games.

During the 2013–14 season, contract extension talks with the Rangers stalled, as the two parties were apparently $500,000 per season apart for six years – Callahan was asking $39 million for six years while New York was firm at $36 million for six years.

=== Tampa Bay Lightning ===
On March 5, 2014, the Tampa Bay Lightning traded captain Martin St. Louis and a second-round draft pick in 2015 (conditional at the time of the trade) to the New York Rangers in exchange for Callahan, a first-round pick in 2015, a conditional second-round pick in 2014 (which later became a first-round pick), and a seventh-round pick in 2015 (conditional at the time of the trade). Both of the first-round draft picks that were acquired by the Lightning in the trade were later traded to the New York Islanders. On June 25, five days before free agency was to begin, Callahan signed a six-year contract extension worth an annual average value of $5.8 million to stay with the Lightning.

On May 11, 2015, during the second round of the 2015 playoffs, Callahan underwent an emergency appendectomy. He missed Game 6 against the Montreal Canadiens as a result of the procedure. Just five days after having surgery, however, Callahan returned to the lineup for Game 1 of the Eastern Conference Final against his former team, the Presidents' Trophy-winning New York Rangers. The Lightning eventually defeated the Rangers in seven games. After the Lightning defeated the Rangers, the team would move on to the 2015 Stanley Cup Finals where they were defeated in six games by the Chicago Blackhawks.

On October 7, 2015, Lightning head coach Jon Cooper announced that Callahan will wear a permanent "A" as an alternate captain for the 2015–16 NHL season.

On June 21, 2016, Callahan had surgery to repair a torn labrum in his right hip. Callahan was expected to be out for at least five months. Callahan had been dealing with the injury since the end of the 2015–16 season and throughout the 2016 playoffs as the Lightning advanced to the Eastern Conference Finals and lost in seven games to the Pittsburgh Penguins, one win short from back-to-back Stanley Cup Finals. Due to the injury, Callahan did not participate in the 2016 World Cup of Hockey in Toronto.

On January 15, 2017, the Lightning announced that Callahan was expected to miss four weeks with a lower body injury. Callahan continued to be bothered by his hip, which he had surgically repaired in the off-season. After making his initial return in November, Callahan was limited to only 18 games before missing more time. On February 22, 2017, Lightning General Manager Steve Yzerman announced that Callahan had a follow-up procedure on his right hip in New York City. Yzerman said the doctors figured out what was causing the discomfort in Callahan's hip since having it surgically repaired the previous off-season. Yzerman said the labrum remains intact, and it is more of a scar tissue issue. It is not expected to be a career-threatening issue.

On October 6, 2017, in the 2017–18 season opener against the inner-state rival Florida Panthers, Callahan returned to the Lightning lineup for the first time since undergoing surgery. On December 14, Callahan suffered an upper-body injury against the Arizona Coyotes. The following day, the team announced that Callahan was out indefinitely, and that he would be reevaluated in another three-to-four weeks.; He would eventually end the 2017–18 season playing in 67 games with five goals, 13 assists and 18 points.

Callahan would play 52 games for the Lightning for the 2018–19 season with seven goals, 10 assists for 17 points. After the Lightning won the Presidents' Trophy as the regular season champions, the Lightning unexpectedly got swept in the first round in the 2019 playoffs in four games by the eighth-seeded Columbus Blue Jackets with Callahan being held pointless in two games.

On June 20, 2019, it was announced that Callahan was diagnosed with degenerative disc disease and has been placed on long-term injured reserve, effectively ending his professional career. With one season remaining on his initial 6-year deal, Callahan's contract was traded by the Lightning, along with a 2020 fifth-round pick to the Ottawa Senators in exchange for Mike Condon and a 2020 sixth-round pick on July 30, 2019. After spending one year on the Senators' long-term injured reserve list, Callahan officially announced his retirement from the NHL on December 30, 2020.

== International play ==
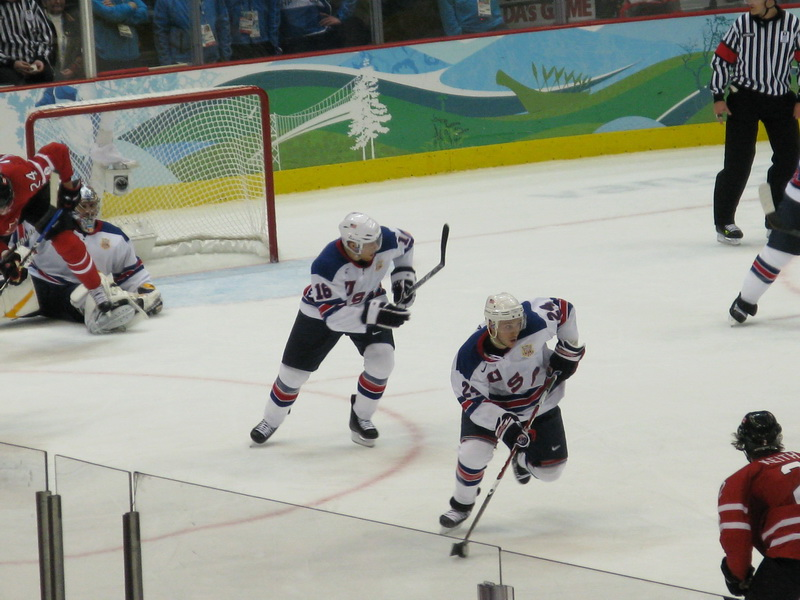
- Callahan (with puck) and Joe Pavelski move up ice against Canada during the 2010 Winter Olympics.

Medal record

Ice hockey

Representing United States

Olympic Games
Silver medal – second place	2010 Vancouver	Tournament

On January 1, 2010, Callahan was named to the Team USA roster for participation at the 2010 Winter Olympics in Vancouver, with which he earned a silver medal with, falling to Canada in the tournament final.

Callahan also played in the following Winter Olympics, 2014, for the United States, although the team failed to medal, losing 5–0 to Finland in the bronze medal game.

On May 27, 2016, Team USA named Callahan to its 2016 World Cup of Hockey roster. Callahan was named as part of the final seven selections to fill out the remainder of the World Cup roster. Due to a labral tear in his hip, Callahan missed the World Cup.

== Personal life ==
Callahan lists Brendan Shanahan as his favorite player growing up.

On September 16, 2016, the Ryan Callahan Foundation announced their new website and that it will begin their mission to provide moments of family unity to those battling pediatric cancer. The foundation is composed of three elements; Cally's crew, the "2-4" Club, and direct funding efforts to support local and independent cancer foundations in search of a cure. The aim of Cally's Crew is to afford patients and families undergoing pediatric cancer treatment the chance to attend a Tampa Bay Lightning home game in the Ryan Callahan Foundation's suite at Amalie Arena. The "2-4" club functions as a Make-a-Wish style program that provides families with the opportunity to escape cancer treatments with an all-expense-paid trip, experience, or excursion on a monthly basis. Families undergoing treatment will share their stories via the Ryan Callahan Foundation website in order to promote a community of strength and togetherness. From these postings, the foundation will select monthly recipients of the "2-4" club escapes. With respect to the support of local and national charities, the foundation will use monetary funding and also raise awareness for other campaigns to accelerate the timeline towards the elimination of pediatric cancer.

Callahan is of Italian and Irish descent.

== Career statistics ==
=== Regular season and playoffs ===
			Regular season					Playoffs
Season	Team	League	GP	G	A	Pts	PIM	GP	G	A	Pts	PIM
2000–01	Syracuse Jr. Crunch	EmJHL	23	18	16	34	54	—	—	—	—	—
2000–01	Syracuse Jr. Crunch	OPJHL	3	4	2	6	0	—	—	—	—	—
2001–02	Syracuse Jr. Crunch	EmJHL	5	6	5	11	36	—	—	—	—	—
2001–02	Buffalo Lightning	OPJHL	47	13	23	36	75	—	—	—	—	—
2002–03	Guelph Storm	OHL	59	14	17	31	47	11	0	3	3	2
2003–04	Guelph Storm	OHL	68	36	32	68	86	22	13	8	21	20
2004–05	Guelph Storm	OHL	60	28	26	54	108	4	1	1	2	6
2005–06	Guelph Storm	OHL	62	52	32	84	126	13	7	17	24	20
2006–07	Hartford Wolf Pack	AHL	60	35	20	55	74	—	—	—	—	—
2006–07	New York Rangers	NHL	14	4	2	6	9	10	2	1	3	6
2007–08	Hartford Wolf Pack	AHL	11	7	8	15	27	—	—	—	—	—
2007–08	New York Rangers	NHL	52	8	5	13	31	10	2	2	4	10
2008–09	New York Rangers	NHL	81	22	18	40	45	7	2	0	2	4
2009–10	New York Rangers	NHL	77	19	18	37	48	—	—	—	—	—
2010–11	New York Rangers	NHL	60	23	25	48	46	—	—	—	—	—
2011–12	New York Rangers	NHL	76	29	25	54	61	20	6	4	10	12
2012–13	New York Rangers	NHL	45	16	15	31	12	12	2	3	5	6
2013–14	New York Rangers	NHL	45	11	14	25	16	—	—	—	—	—
2013–14	Tampa Bay Lightning	NHL	20	6	5	11	8	4	0	0	0	0
2014–15	Tampa Bay Lightning	NHL	77	24	30	54	41	26	2	6	8	14
2015–16	Tampa Bay Lightning	NHL	73	10	18	28	45	16	2	2	4	29
2016–17	Tampa Bay Lightning	NHL	18	2	2	4	23	—	—	—	—	—
2017–18	Tampa Bay Lightning	NHL	67	5	13	18	29	15	2	1	3	4
2018–19	Tampa Bay Lightning	NHL	52	7	10	17	14	2	0	0	0	4
NHL totals			757	186	200	386	428	121	20	19	39	89

=== International ===
Year	Team	Event	Result	GP	G	A	Pts	PIM
2005	United States	WJC	4th	7	1	2	3	29
2010	United States	OG	2nd place, silver medalist(s)	6	0	1	1	2
2014	United States	OG	4th	6	0	1	1	0
Junior totals				7	1	2	3	29
Senior totals				12	0	2	2	2

== Awards and honors ==
Award	Year
OHL
Third All-Star Team	2005
Second All-Star Team	2006
Leo Lalonde Memorial Trophy	2006
AHL
All-Rookie Team	2007
NHL
Steven McDonald Extra Effort Award	2009, 2010, 2012, 2013

== Transactions ==
- June 27, 2004 – Drafted by the New York Rangers in the fourth round, 127th overall.
- July 27, 2011 – Signed a three-year, $12.825 million with the New York Rangers.
- March 5, 2014 – Traded to the Tampa Bay Lightning in exchange for Martin St. Louis, a first-round pick (2015) and a conditional second-round pick (2014).
- June 25, 2014 – Signed a six-year, $34.8 million with the Tampa Bay Lightning.

Sporting positions
Preceded by Chris Drury	New York Rangers captain 2011–14	Succeeded by Ryan McDonagh
