= 2019 Tampa Bay Lightning–Columbus Blue Jackets playoff series =

2019 Eastern Conference first round
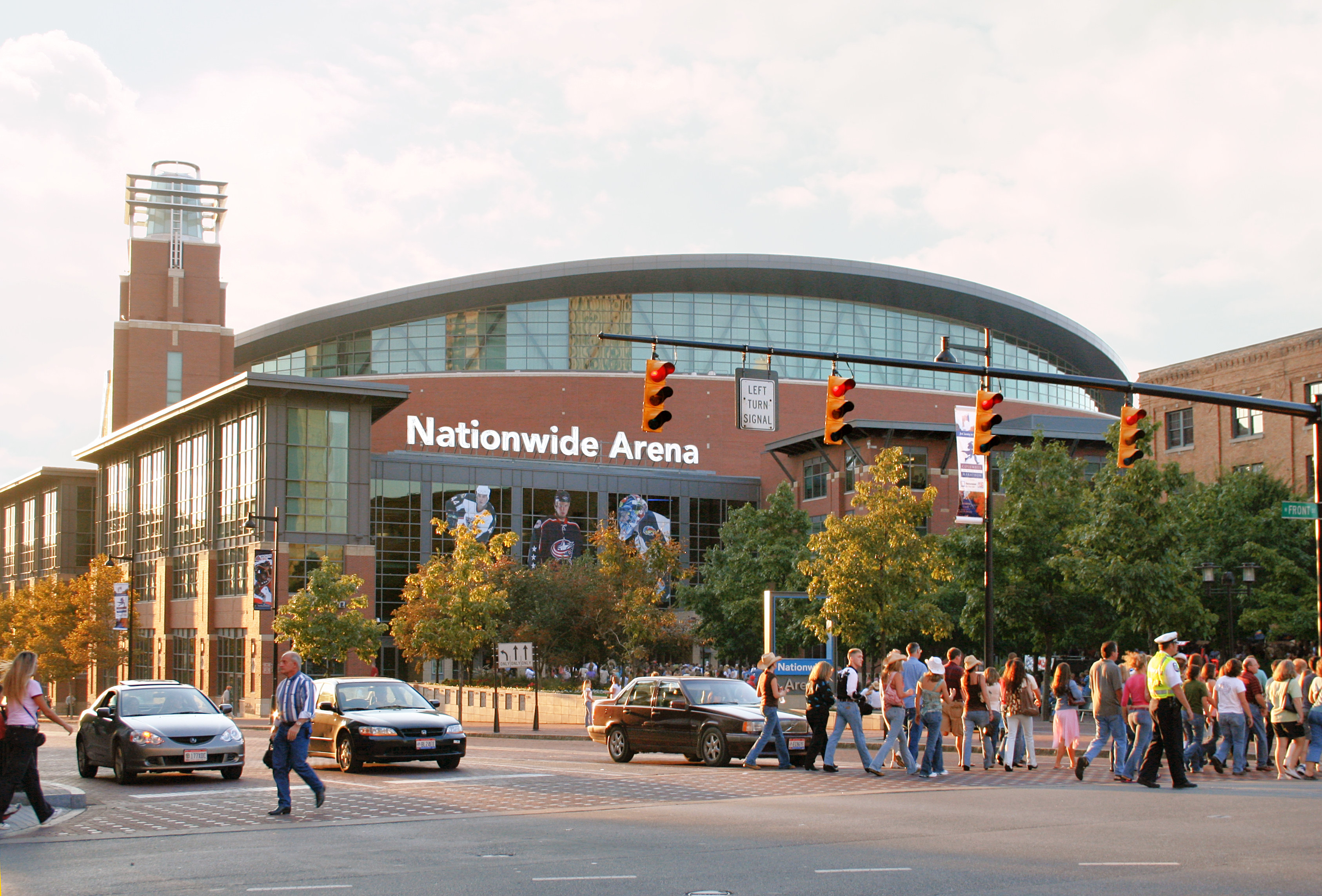
- Nationwide Arena in Columbus, Ohio, site of games 3 and 4
	1	2	3	4	Total
Columbus Blue Jackets	4	5	3	7	4
Tampa Bay Lightning	3	1	1	3	0
- Location(s): Columbus: Nationwide Arena (3, 4); Tampa Bay: Amalie Arena (1, 2)
- Coaches: Columbus: John Tortorella; Tampa Bay: Jon Cooper
- Captains: Columbus: Nick Foligno; Tampa Bay: Steven Stamkos
- Referees: Marc Joannette, Jon McIsaac (1); Francis Charron, Gord Dwyer (2); Wes McCauley, Brian Pochmarra (3); Kelly Sutherland, Chris Lee (4)
- Dates: April 10–16
- Networks: Canada (English): Sportsnet; Canada (French): TVA Sports; United States (English) (National): USA (1), CNBC (2 and 4) and NBCSN (3); Columbus: Fox Sports Ohio; Tampa Bay: Fox Sports Sun
- Announcers: John Forslund and Pierre McGuire (Games 1–2, 4); John Forslund and Brian Boucher (Game 3); (NBC Sports and Sportsnet); Jeff Rimer and Jody Shelley (Fox Sports Ohio); Rick Peckham and Brian Engblom (Fox Sports Sun)

The 2019 Stanley Cup Eastern Conference first round series between the Tampa Bay Lightning and the Columbus Blue Jackets was a playoff series in the National Hockey League (NHL) that took place during the 2019 playoffs. The series began on April 10, 2019 and ended on April 16.

The 2018–19 regular season saw the Tampa Bay Lightning tie the 1995–96 Detroit Red Wings for the most regular season wins in NHL history. The Columbus Blue Jackets came into the series as the eighth seed, finishing with 98 points and qualifying for the playoffs in their second to last game. Tampa Bay won the Presidents' Trophy with 128 points and had beaten Columbus in all three regular season meetings by a combined score of 17 to 3. The Lightning were seen by analysts as the overwhelming favorites to win the series. However, the series ended in a shocking elimination for the Lightning; they surrendered a 3–0 lead at the end of the first period and lost game one, 4–3. The Blue Jackets subsequently won game two, 5–1 and, in Columbus, Ohio, won games three and four, 3–1 and 7–3 respectively. The series concluded with Columbus sweeping the Lightning in four games, with a +11 goal differential, while never trailing in the final three games.

The series marked several NHL records. Tampa's elimination was the first time a Presidents' Trophy winner was swept by an eighth seed. It was the fifth time in NHL history that a team with the best regular season record got swept in the first round (and the first time since the Expansion Era). The Blue Jackets' victory was their first ever playoff series win in franchise history and ended the longest playoff series win drought starting from the fewest wins. It was also the first time that a Presidents' Trophy winner was eliminated in the first round since 2012, though this would happen again in 2023.

Many commentators consider this series to be one of the greatest upsets in NHL history, considering that the Blue Jackets trailed the Lightning by 30 points exactly during the regular season. Jeremy Roenick of NBC Sports described Tampa's elimination as "one of the biggest letdowns in history", while the Tampa Bay Times described it as "the disappointment that all others are measured against".

The two teams would once again play each other the next year in the first round of the 2020 Stanley Cup playoffs, where the Lightning would avenge the previous year's loss winning that series 4–1 and would eventually go on to win the Stanley Cup. Tampa Bay would go on to win back-to-back Stanley Cups in the 2020 and 2021, and would again make it to the Stanley Cup Final series in 2022, but would lose to the Colorado Avalanche.

== Background ==
=== Columbus Blue Jackets ===
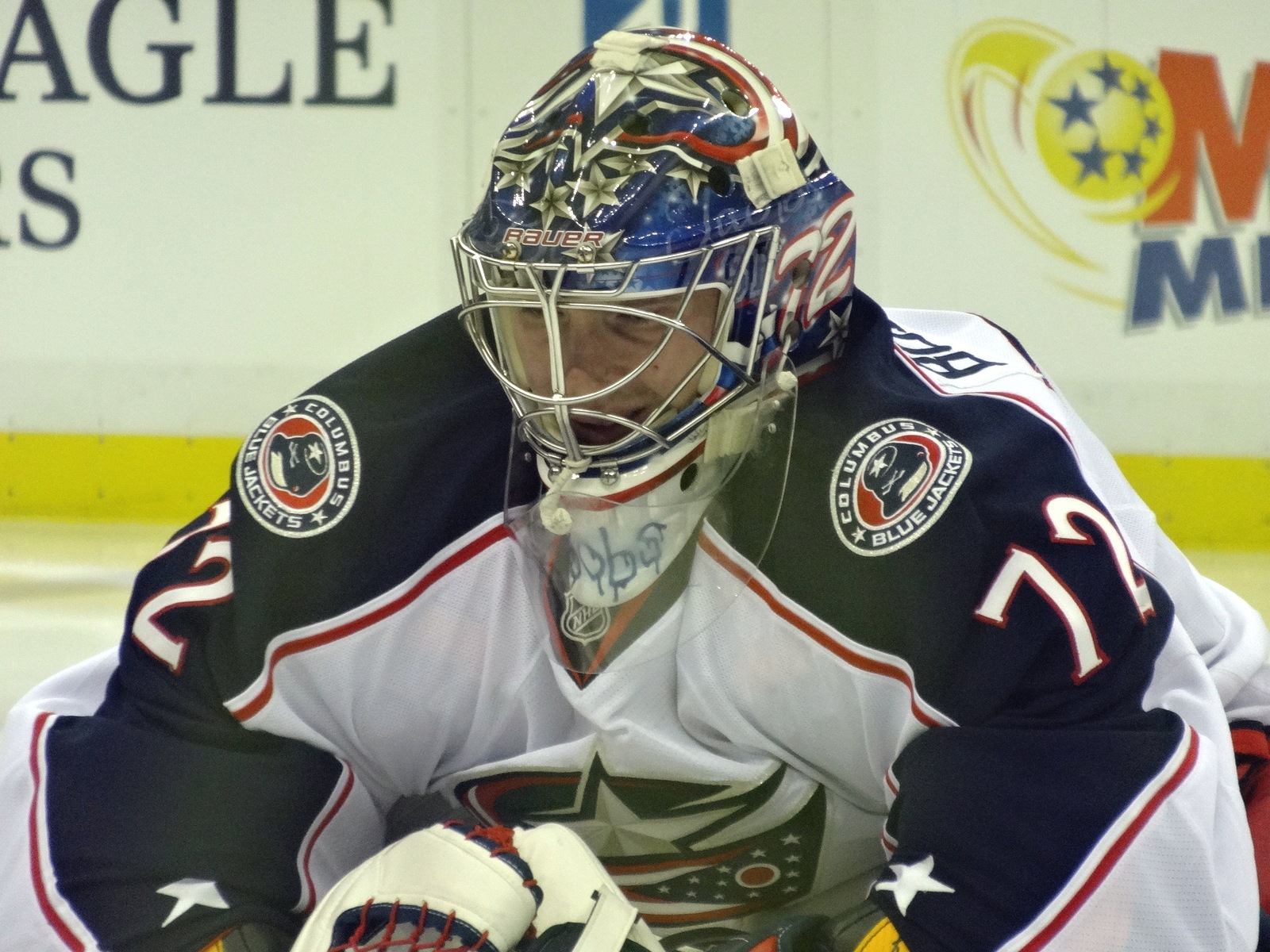
Sergei Bobrovsky with the Columbus Blue Jackets during the 2013–14 season.

The Blue Jackets entered the 2019 Stanley Cup playoffs as a wild card qualifier, qualifying in back-to-back years for the first time in franchise history. They faced the Washington Capitals in the first round, winning the first two games in overtime and their first series lead. However, they lost the next four games and the series in six games.

Two-time Vezina Trophy winner Sergei Bobrovsky and the team's leading scorer, Artemi Panarin were in the final year of their contracts before becoming unrestricted free agents. Blue Jackets general Jarmo Kekäläinen was an active participant near the trade deadline window of the 2018–19 season, acquiring several players with expiring contracts. On February 22, 2019, the Blue Jackets acquired Matt Duchene in a trade with the Ottawa Senators. A day later, the Blue Jackets traded again with the Senators, this time acquiring Ryan Dzingel in exchange for Anthony Duclair. On February 25, the Blue Jackets acquired Keith Kinkaid from the New Jersey Devils in exchange for a fifth-round pick in the 2022 NHL entry draft, and later acquired Adam McQuaid from the New York Rangers in exchange for Julius Bergman and fourth and seventh-round picks in the 2019 NHL entry draft.

Despite these acquisitions, the Blue Jackets initially struggled into March as they faced fierce competition from the Montreal Canadiens and the Carolina Hurricanes for the last two Wild Card spots. They won seven of their last eight games and on April 5, 2019, the Blue Jackets clinched the final playoff spot in the Eastern Conference with a 3–2 shootout win over the New York Rangers.

=== Tampa Bay Lightning ===
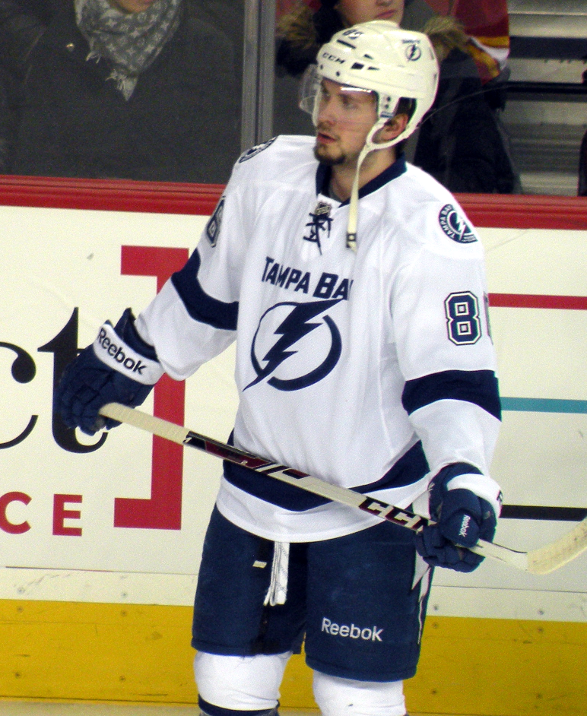
Kucherov with the Lightning in 2014.

In the 2018 Stanley Cup playoffs, the Lightning eliminated the New Jersey Devils in the first round and the Boston Bruins in the second round, both in five games. However, they were defeated in the Eastern Conference finals by the eventual Stanley Cup champions, the Washington Capitals, in seven games.

Prior to the start of the 2018–19 season, it was announced that Steve Yzerman was resigning from his position as general manager, and Julien BriseBois took his place. The Lightning clinched their first Presidents' Trophy and second consecutive division title and secured home-ice advantage throughout the playoffs.

The Lightning finished the 2018–19 regular season with 62 wins, tied with the 1995–96 Detroit Red Wings for most wins in a single season in NHL history (a record since broken by the 2022–23 Boston Bruins). They recorded 128 points in the regular season a total that is behind only the 1995–96 Detroit Red Wings (131) and the 2022–23 Boston Bruins) (135). They were also the highest-scoring team on average (3.89) since the 1995–96 Red Wings and, of their 62 wins, 30 were by a margin of three or more goals, which was tied for the most since 1992–93.

Pivotal to the Lightning's success was their offense led by Steven Stamkos, Brayden Point, and Nikita Kucherov. On March 9, 2019, Kucherov set the Lightning single season record for points in a season with his 109th point of year. Kucherov went on to record his 40th goal of the season on April 5, and his 126th point, setting the record for most points in an NHL season during the salary cap era, a record formerly held by Joe Thornton. Kucherov ended the season with 128 points (41 goals and 87 assists), surpassing Alexander Mogilny for most points in the NHL by a Russian-born player and winning the Art Ross Trophy. Stamkos and Point also exceeded 40 goals and 90 overall points each by the seasons end.

== Game summaries ==
=== Game one ===
April 10	Columbus Blue Jackets	4–3	Tampa Bay Lightning	Amalie Arena	Recap

In game one, the Blue Jackets scored four unanswered goals to overcome a three-goal deficit, winning the game by a score of 4–3.

Scoring summary
Period	Team	Goal	Assist(s)	Time	Score
1st	TBL	Alex Killorn (1) – sh	Unassisted	04:12	1–0 TBL
1st	TBL	Anthony Cirelli (1)	Erik Cernak (1) and J. T. Miller (1)	11:01	2–0 TBL
1st	TBL	Yanni Gourde (1)	Mikhail Sergachev (1) and Jan Rutta (1)	17:50	3–0 TBL
2nd	CBJ	Nick Foligno (1)	Josh Anderson (1)	09:15	3–1 TBL
3rd	CBJ	David Savard (1)	Unassisted	07:56	3–2 TBL
3rd	CBJ	Josh Anderson (1) – sh	Boone Jenner (1)	11:54	3–3
3rd	CBJ	Seth Jones (1) – pp	Artemi Panarin (1) and Zach Werenski (1)	14:05	4–3 CBJ
Penalty summary
Period	Team	Player	Penalty	Time	PIM
1st	TBL	Daniel Girardi	Illegal check to head	02:55	2:00
1st	CBJ	Brandon Dubinsky	Roughing	02:55	2:00
1st	TBL	Daniel Girardi (served by J. T. Miller)	Roughing	02:55	2:00
1st	CBJ	David Savard	Interference	19:27	2:00
2nd	None				
3rd	CBJ	Brandon Dubinsky	High-sticking – double minor	09:23	4:00
3rd	TBL	Alex Killorn	High-sticking	12:16	2:00

Shots by period
Team	1	2	3	Total
Columbus	6	11	9	26
Tampa Bay	13	11	5	29

=== Game two ===
April 12	Columbus Blue Jackets	5–1	Tampa Bay Lightning	Amalie Arena	Recap

Matt Duchene recorded 4 points for Columbus in game two, granting the Blue Jackets a 5–1 victory and a 2–0 series lead.

Scoring summary
Period	Team	Goal	Assist(s)	Time	Score
1st	CBJ	Cam Atkinson (1)	Matt Duchene (1)	05:15	1–0 CBJ
1st	CBJ	Zach Werenski (1) – pp	Matt Duchene (2)	11:44	2–0 CBJ
2nd	CBJ	Matt Duchene (1) – pp	Artemi Panarin (2) and Zach Werenski (2)	01:28	3–0 CBJ
3rd	TBL	Mikhail Sergachev (1)	J. T. Miller (2) and Erik Cernak (2)	05:00	3–1 CBJ
3rd	CBJ	Riley Nash (1)	Boone Jenner (2)	09:06	4–1 CBJ
3rd	CBJ	Artemi Panarin (1)	Matt Duchene (3) and Oliver Bjorkstrand (1)	12:16	5–1 CBJ
Penalty summary
Period	Team	Player	Penalty	Time	PIM
1st	TBL	Adam Erne	Delay of game (puck over glass)	07:08	2:00
1st	TBL	Ondrej Palat	Hooking	11:40	2:00
1st	TBL	Brayden Point	Fighting – major	15:11	5:00
1st	CBJ	Zach Werenski	Fighting – major	15:11	5:00
2nd	TBL	Alex Killorn	Interference	00:30	2:00
2nd	CBJ	Bench (served by Matt Duchene)	Too many men on the ice	04:21	2:00
3rd	CBJ	Nick Foligno	Tripping	05:51	2:00
3rd	TBL	Nikita Kucherov	Tripping	15:34	2:00
3rd	TBL	Nikita Kucherov	Boarding – major	15:34	5:00
3rd	TBL	Nikita Kucherov	Game misconduct	15:34	10:00
3rd	TBL	Victor Hedman	Misconduct	15:34	10:00
3rd	CBJ	Josh Anderson	Roughing	15:34	2:00
3rd	CBJ	Josh Anderson	Misconduct	15:34	10:00

Shots by period
Team	1	2	3	Total
Columbus	10	7	10	27
Tampa Bay	8	5	11	24

=== Game three ===
April 14	Tampa Bay Lightning	1–3	Columbus Blue Jackets	Nationwide Arena	Recap

After Nikita Kucherov checked Markus Nutivaara into the boards in game two, the NHL Player Safety suspended the Lightning forward for game three. In game three, Sergei Bobrovsky made 30 saves, giving the Blue Jackets a 3–1 victory and their first 3–0 series lead in franchise history.

Scoring summary
Period	Team	Goal	Assist(s)	Time	Score
1st	None				
2nd	CBJ	Matt Duchene (2)	Cam Atkinson (1) and Zach Werenski (3)	01:44	1–0 CBJ
2nd	CBJ	Oliver Bjorkstrand (1) – pp	Seth Jones (1) and Alexandre Texier (1)	08:25	2–0 CBJ
3rd	TBL	Ondrej Palat (1)	Erik Cernak (1) and Tyler Johnson (3)	04:40	2–1 CBJ
3rd	CBJ	Cam Atkinson (2) – en	Artemi Panarin (3) and Scott Harrington (1)	19:00	3–1 CBJ
Penalty summary
Period	Team	Player	Penalty	Time	PIM
1st	TBL	Alex Killorn	Goaltender interference	06:13	2:00
1st	TBL	Ryan Callahan	Roughing	15:50	2:00
1st	CBJ	Ryan Dzingel	Roughing	15:50	2:00
2nd	TBL	Ryan Callahan	Interference	06:50	2:00
3rd	TBL	Steven Stamkos	Roughing	19:28	2:00
3rd	CBJ	Riley Nash	Unsportsmanlike conduct	19:28	2:00

Shots by period
Team	1	2	3	Total
Tampa Bay	3	11	17	31
Columbus	12	10	8	30

=== Game four ===
April 16	Tampa Bay Lightning	3–7	Columbus Blue Jackets	Nationwide Arena	Recap

In game four, the Lightning, desperate for a victory, could not overcome the early two-goal deficit they faced in the first period, allowing Columbus to score three empty-net goals late in the third period and win 7–3, sweeping Tampa Bay 4–0 and earning their first playoff series victory in franchise history. The Lightning became the first Presidents' Trophy winners to be swept in the opening round, and the first Presidents' Trophy winners to be defeated in the opening round since 2012. This was also the first time a Presidents' Trophy winning team was swept in a playoff series since 1995.

Scoring summary
Period	Team	Goal	Assist(s)	Time	Score
1st	CBJ	Alexandre Texier (1) – pp	Seth Jones (1) and Pierre-Luc Dubois (1)	02:26	1–0 CBJ
1st	CBJ	Pierre-Luc Dubois (1)	Oliver Bjorkstrand (2) and Adam Clendening (1)	03:48	2–0 CBJ
1st	TBL	Steven Stamkos (1)	Nikita Kucherov (1) and Anthony Cirelli (1)	08:44	2–1 CBJ
2nd	CBJ	Seth Jones (2)	Cam Atkinson (2) and Matt Duchene (4)	06:28	3–1 CBJ
2nd	TBL	Cedric Paquette (1)	Braydon Coburn (1) and Jan Rutta (2)	13:03	3–2 CBJ
2nd	TBL	Brayden Point (1) – pp	Steven Stamkos (1) and Nikita Kucherov (2)	17:52	3–3
2nd	CBJ	Oliver Bjorkstrand (2)	Scott Harrington (2) and Pierre-Luc Dubois (2)	18:46	4–3 CBJ
3rd	CBJ	Artemi Panarin (2) – en	Unassisted	18:07	5–3 CBJ
3rd	CBJ	Alexandre Texier (2) – en	Zach Werenski (4) and Nick Foligno (1)	18:26	6–3 CBJ
3rd	CBJ	Matt Duchene (3) – en	David Savard (1) and Scott Harrington (3)	19:51	7–3 CBJ
Penalty summary
Period	Team	Player	Penalty	Time	PIM
1st	TBL	Ryan McDonagh	Slashing	00:45	2:00
1st	TBL	Nikita Kucherov	Tripping	11:18	2:00
2nd	CBJ	Zach Werenski	Cross-checking	16:43	2:00
3rd	None				

Shots by period
Team	1	2	3	Total
Tampa Bay	7	13	13	33
Columbus	8	12	5	25

== Team rosters ==
=== Columbus Blue Jackets ===
Updated April 16, 2019

No.	Nat	Player	Pos	S/G	Age	Acquired	Birthplace
77	(Canada)	Josh Anderson	RW	R	24	2015	Burlington, Ontario
13	(United States)	Cam Atkinson (A)	RW	R	29	2008	Riverside, Connecticut
28	(Denmark)	Oliver Bjorkstrand	RW	R	24	2013	Herning, Denmark
72	(Russia)	Sergei Bobrovsky	G	L	30	2012	Novokuznetsk, Soviet Union
6	(United States)	Adam Clendening	D	R	26	2018	Niagara Falls, New York
17	(United States)	Brandon Dubinsky	C/LW	L	32	2012	Anchorage, Alaska
18	(Canada)	Pierre-Luc Dubois	LW/C	L	20	2016	Ste-Agathe-des-Monts, Quebec
95	(Canada)	Matt Duchene	C	L	28	2019	Haliburton, Ontario
19	(United States)	Ryan Dzingel	LW	L	27	2019	Wheaton, Illinois
71	(United States)	Nick Foligno (C)	LW	L	31	2012	Buffalo, New York
4	(Canada)	Scott Harrington	D	L	26	2016	Kingston, Ontario
38	(Canada)	Boone Jenner (A)	C	L	25	2011	London, Ontario
3	(United States)	Seth Jones (A)	D	R	24	2016	Arlington, Texas
70	(Finland)	Joonas Korpisalo	G	L	24	2012	Pori, Finland
14	(Switzerland)	Dean Kukan	D	L	25	2015	Zürich, Switzerland
20	(Canada)	Riley Nash	C	R	29	2018	Consort, Alberta
65	(Finland)	Markus Nutivaara	D	L	24	2015	Oulu, Finland
9	(Russia)	Artemi Panarin	LW	R	27	2017	Korkino, Soviet Union
58	(Canada)	David Savard	D	R	28	2009	Saint-Hyacinthe, Quebec
42	(France)	Alexandre Texier	C	L	19	2017	Grenoble, France
8	(United States)	Zach Werenski	D	L	21	2015	Grosse Pointe, Michigan

=== Tampa Bay Lightning ===
Updated April 16, 2019

No.	Nat	Player	Pos	S/G	Age	Acquired	Birthplace
24	(United States)	Ryan Callahan (A)	RW	R	34	2014	Rochester, New York
81	(Slovakia)	Erik Cernak	D	R	21	2017	Košice, Slovakia
71	(Canada)	Anthony Cirelli	C	L	21	2015	Woodbridge, Ontario
55	(Canada)	Braydon Coburn	D	L	34	2015	Calgary, Alberta
70	(Canada)	Louis Domingue	G	L	27	2017	Mont-Saint-Hilaire, Quebec
73	(United States)	Adam Erne	LW	L	23	2013	New Haven, Connecticut
5	(Canada)	Daniel Girardi	D	R	34	2017	Welland, Ontario
37	(Canada)	Yanni Gourde	LW	L	27	2014	Saint-Narcisse, Quebec
77	(Sweden)	Victor Hedman	D	L	28	2009	Örnsköldsvik, Sweden
9	(United States)	Tyler Johnson	C	R	28	2011	Spokane, Washington
7	(Canada)	Mathieu Joseph	RW	L	22	2017	Laval, Quebec
17	(Canada)	Alex Killorn	C	L	29	2007	Halifax, Nova Scotia
86	(Russia)	Nikita Kucherov	RW	L	25	2011	Maykop, Russia
27	(United States)	Ryan McDonagh	D	L	29	2018	St. Paul, Minnesota
10	(United States)	J. T. Miller	C/RW	L	26	2018	East Palestine, Ohio
18	(Czech Republic)	Ondrej Palat (A)	LW	L	28	2011	Frýdek-Místek, Czechoslovakia
13	(Canada)	Cedric Paquette	C	L	25	2012	Gaspé, Quebec
21	(Canada)	Brayden Point	C	R	23	2014	Calgary, Alberta
44	(Czech Republic)	Jan Rutta	D	R	28	2019	Písek, Czechoslovakia
98	(Russia)	Mikhail Sergachev	D	L	20	2017	Nizhnekamsk, Russia
91	(Canada)	Steven Stamkos (C)	C	R	29	2008	Markham, Ontario
88	(Russia)	Andrei Vasilevskiy	G	L	24	2012	Tyumen, Russia

== Reactions ==
=== Professional ===
Prior to game four between the Boston Bruins and the Toronto Maple Leafs, Toronto's forward Zach Hyman expressed shock over the Lightning's exit from the playoffs. "I don't think Columbus is really an eighth seed. They loaded up at the (trade) deadline. They've got some great players. But Tampa set a bunch of records, so it's pretty surprising." Hyman's teammate Travis Dermott acknowledged a difference between the regular season and postseason, but continued to state: "It's kind of crazy to think such a good team in the regular season can go out in four like that. You never really would have thunk (sic) it." Bruins head coach Bruce Cassidy acknowledged that every team had a chance, but also admitted that he did not guess the Lightning would fail to win a single game in the series.

=== Media ===
Tampa Bay Lightning
(@TBLightning)
tweeted:

We don't have any words and we know you don't want to hear them. We understand your anger, your frustration, your sadness. Everything you're feeling – we get it. This isn't the ending we imagined, and certainly not the one we wanted. Thank you for being there the entire way.

April 16, 2019

The sports section of the Tampa Bay Times greeted the game three result with a headline reading "Torturella". When the Blue Jackets' sweep was confirmed, the frontpage headlines of the Tampa Bay Times read "Fizzled Sticks" and "Floored". The paper savaged the Lightning for their poor play, suggesting their defeat "was the final chapter in a whole new story of despair. In a way, it was as if an entire community was duped. For six months, the Lightning had you believing you were seeing something historic. And in the end, it was all choke and mirrors."

Meanwhile, Columbus paper The Columbus Dispatch heralded the results, with its frontpage headline reading "A Sweep to Savor". Game four of the series delivered a household rating of 9.83 for Fox Sports Ohio, the highest-ever ratings for a Blue Jackets telecast. On average, the series delivered an average of 6.48 household rating in the Columbus metropolitan area.

The New York Times described the series' result as a playoff meltdown for the Lightning, suggesting that the Lightning could be amongst the biggest playoff underachievers in sports history. USA Today described the Lightning's exit as one of the worst playoff flops in NHL history, while Deadspin stated "[the Lightning] failed to show up in their first-round series against the tremendously underestimated Columbus Blue Jackets, and they paid the price." In an interview on NPR, Greg Wyshynski of ESPN stated the Lightning had to apologize to their fans. Wyshynski went on to state that the only other team in the history of the four major sports leagues in America that failed to win a playoff game after equivalent levels of regular season success was the 2011 Green Bay Packers team that went 15–1. "But in [the Packers'] case, we're talking about one game. [The Lightning] is a team that had four chances to win a game, and they couldn't do it."

In Canada, Rory Boylen of Sportsnet described the series as the biggest upset in the salary cap era of the NHL. He postulated that the result may be a culmination of how the Lightning got eliminated in recent seasons, going as far back as their first round loss in the 2014 Stanley Cup playoffs against the Montreal Canadiens. In his words, "time will tell if these Lightning are like the San Jose Sharks – a squad that seemed to have everything in place for years and even got to one Stanley Cup Final, but could never win it all – or if they'll eventually put it together for a successful run as Washington [Capitals] did last season."

=== Financial ===
WFTS-TV reported that the city of Tampa could lose up to $50 million in potential revenue as a result of the sweep. Conversely, in Columbus, merchandise sales tripled as a result of the Blue Jackets' surprise series win.

== See also ==
- 2023 Fairleigh Dickinson vs. Purdue men's basketball game, the second time a 16-seed beat a 1-seed in men's college basketball, also held at Nationwide Arena
- Miracle on Ice
- Miracle on Manchester
