= Jacques Demers =

Canadian Ice Hockey Coach and Politician

The Honourable Jacques Demers
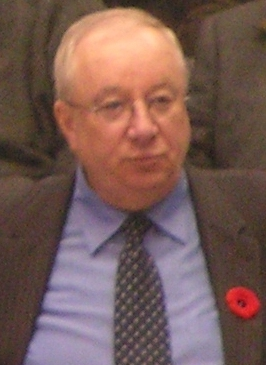
- Demers in 2008
- Born: 25 August 1944 (age 82) Montreal, Quebec, Canada
- Coached for: Indianapolis Racers; Cincinnati Stingers; Quebec Nordiques; St. Louis Blues; Detroit Red Wings; Montreal Canadiens; Tampa Bay Lightning; Fredericton Express
- National team: Canada
- Coaching career: 1975–1999

Canadian Senator from Quebec (Rigaud)
- In office 27 August 2009 – 25 August 2019
- Nominated by: Stephen Harper
- Appointed by: Michaëlle Jean
- Preceded by: Yoine Goldstein

Personal details
- Party: Independent Senators Group
- Other political affiliations: Conservative (2009–2015)
- Spouse: Deborah Anderson
- Children: 4

Jacques Demers (born 25 August 1944) is a Canadian former Senator, former broadcaster and former professional ice hockey head coach. Demers had started out as a chief scout for the Chicago Cougars of the World Hockey Association before rising to director of player personnel. When the team folded in 1975, he joined the Indianapolis Racers. Five games into the 1975-76 season, he was named interim coach of the team and led them to a division championship. After a second season saw him reach the postseason again, he left the team to coach the Cincinnati Stingers for 1977, but he did not elect to stay with the team after just one season. He was soon hired to coach the Quebec Nordiques in 1978 and coached them to a 2nd place finish in the final season of the WHA. He coached the first season of the Nordiques in the National Hockey League (NHL) before he was fired in 1980. Three years later, he returned to the NHL with the St. Louis Blues, where he led them to the postseason in each of his three seasons that included a trip to the Conference Finals in 1986 (the first appearance for the team in sixteen years) before he left to coach the Detroit Red Wings in 1986. He led the Red Wings to the Conference Finals twice and won two division titles but was let go after the team missed the playoffs in 1990. He was hired to coach the Montreal Canadiens in 1992 and in his first season, he led the team to the Stanley Cup Final, which they won in five games for what is currently the last victory by a Canadian team. The Canadiens sputtered in 1994 and Demers was fired five games into the 1995 season. He closed his career out with the Tampa Bay Lightning, coaching from 1997 to 1999. In total, he went to the postseason eleven times in eighteen seasons as a coach.

After his coaching career ended, Demers became an analyst for Montreal Canadiens games on RDS. On 27 August 2009, he was nominated by Prime Minister Stephen Harper to fill the Canadian Senate seat vacated by Yoine Goldstein. Senator Demers represented the Conservative Party in the Senate until December 2015 when he resigned from the Conservative caucus in order to sit as an Independent. On his 75th birthday on 25 August 2019, he left his position as Senator.

== Early life ==
Demers worked a variety of jobs at a young age to support his family, which included a grocery store and Coke truck driver. He played hockey in the Montreal Junior League but elected to retire in favor of coaching when he broke his leg at 18. He later moved to the South Shore and became coach of the Chateauguay Wings, a Junior B team in Quebec.

== Head coaching career ==
=== WHA ===
Demers was hired to be chief scout of the Chicago Cougars. By 1974, Demers was the director of player personnel for the team. He also served as bench coach for the team to assist Pat Stapleton, who served as player-coach. When the Cougars dissolved in the summer of 1975, Demers joined the second-year Indianapolis Racers (then coached by Gerry Moore) as a consultant in June before soon being named director of player personnel. However, on October 18, 1975, Moore was fired by general manager Jim Browitt after the Racers lost the home opener to send them to a record of 1–4 and Demers was named interim coach. In the second (and final) year of the WHA's experiment of three divisions (Western, Eastern, Canadian), the Racers managed to narrowly clinch first place in the Eastern Division, edging out the Cleveland Crusaders and New England Whalers by three points, going 35–39–6. They were then matched against the Whalers in the Quarterfinals but New England took them the full seven games and won the series in Indianapolis to end the Racers season.

In the summer of 1977, the uncertainty of the team's survival came into play publicly, with the Indiana National Bank seizing the assets of the team when they could not make their loan repayments. Demers was offered to work as a general manager and coach of the junior hockey team of the Montreal Canadiens, but another opportunity came up when the Racers gave permission to the Cincinnati Stingers to talk to Demers about coaching, having just fired Terry Slater. On June 15, Demers stated that he planned to asked to be released from his contract with Indianapolis. A day later, the Stingers announced the hiring of Demers as coach. He coached 80 games for the Stingers, who finished out of the playoffs. Uncertainty over the future of the team led to management being hesitant to extend the contract of Demers beyond its expiration in August 1978. On June 8, he resigned from the Stingers. Days later, he signed a deal with the Quebec Nordiques on a two-year contract with an option for a third year.

Demers had the opportunity to coach Wayne Gretzky in the 1979 WHA All-Star Series. The format of the series was a three-game set that pitted the WHA All-Stars against HC Moscow Dynamo. Demers asked Gordie Howe if it was okay to put him on a line with Wayne Gretzky and his son Mark Howe. In Game One, the line scored seven points as the WHA All-Stars won by a score of 4–2. In Game Two, Gretzky and Mark Howe each scored a goal and Gordie Howe picked up an assist as the WHA won 4–2. The line did not score in the final game, but the WHA won by a score of 4–3.

=== NHL ===
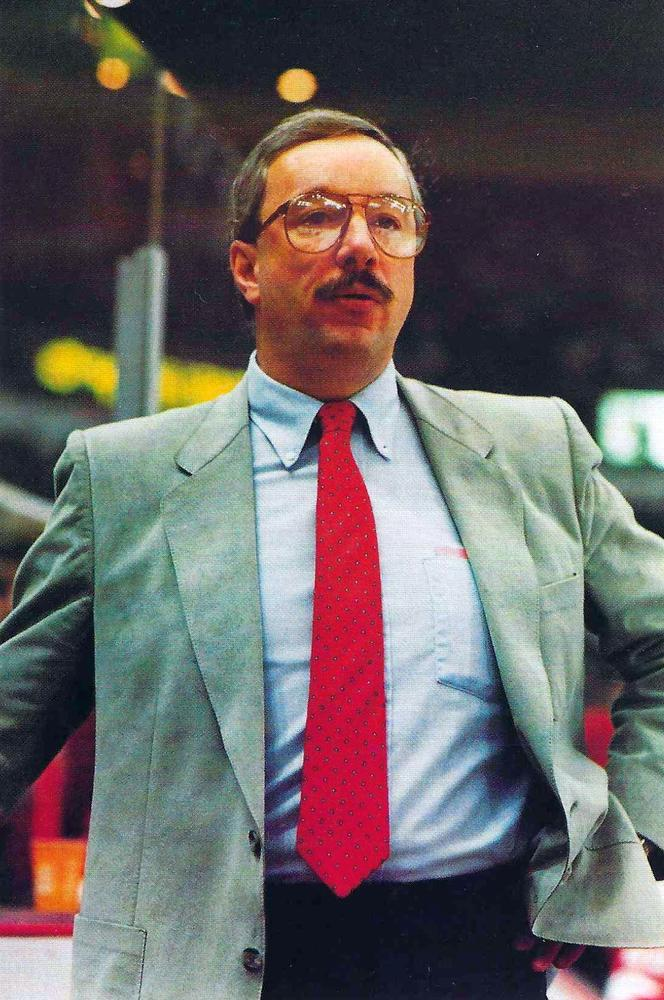
1988-89 postcard of Demers as head coach of Detroit Red Wings

While in the NHL, he coached the Quebec Nordiques, St. Louis Blues, Detroit Red Wings, Montreal Canadiens, and Tampa Bay Lightning.

Demers could resort to unusual methods to try and help his team: during a game in the 1986 Stanley Cup playoffs, he threw pennies on the ice on when play was being stopped on two occasions, even admitting as such. On June 13, 1986, Demers quit the Blues and signed with the Detroit Red Wings. When the Blues tried to complain about tampering, Demers stated he never had a contract signed with the Blues, stating that it was merely a verbal one (six months earlier, he agreed verbally to coach the Blues for three more years); he was reportedly being paid just $75,000 by the team when the average salary of a coach was around $130,000. Apparently, Demers learned that team owner Harry Ornest bragged about having "both the best and lowest-paid coach in the National Hockey League". The team sued him in August but the Red Wings still retained Demers as coach on a deal of $1.1 million over five years. In 240 games, Demers went 106-106-28, which at the time was the 2nd most for wins in franchise history.

Demers was quoted as stating his focus on players and defense: "I'm strong on mental preparation. If a player is . . . not relaxed, he can't perform. I try to keep the guys loose. When things go bad, we talk about it. And if guys play bad, we let them know, but we don't make them uptight. I try never to be uptight as a coach, and it's important to carry that attitude along to the players." With the Red Wings, he led them to their first Conference Finals appearance since 1966, doing so in each of his first two seasons. He won the Jack Adams Awards as NHL Coach of the Year for both 1987 and 1988, becoming the first (and so far only) person to win the award in consecutive years. He was also responsible for naming longtime Red Wing Steve Yzerman as team captain. The team became fractured after teammates broke curfew prior to a Game 5 loss in the Conference Final in 1988, and the Red Wings fired Demers two years later. For the next few years, Demers worked for the Quebec Nordiques as a radio analyst.

On June 11, 1992, Demers was hired by the Montreal Canadiens (who also considered Michel Bergeron and André Boudrias) on a three-year contract to succeed Pat Burns. Apparently, in the first meeting with the team that year, Demers stated that they were going to shock the world and win the Stanley Cup. With an unshakable confidence in his player, the Canadiens finished 3rd place in their division for the 1992–93 NHL season but rolled through the competition in the playoffs to reach the 1993 Stanley Cup Final, where they faced the Los Angeles Kings. In Game 2 of the series, with the team trailing 2–1 with 1:45 remaining in the third period, Demers called the referees to measure the curve of Kings defenseman Marty McSorley's stick. The stick was deemed illegal and McSorley received a minor penalty. Demers then took his goalie Patrick Roy out to set a 6-on-4 advantage that resulted in a goal by Eric Desjardins to tie the game in a game they then won in overtime to even the series for Montreal. McSorley believed that the team had an inside advantage in what sticks to check while Demers stated that Canadiens captain Guy Carbonneau was the one who spotted the stick. The following season saw them reach the playoffs but lose in the first round. The 1994-95 season saw Carbonneau traded in August and a miserable year that saw them win just 18 of 48 games (the first season the team missed the playoffs since 1970) in the strike-shortened season that saw further players traded away. After an 0–5 start to the 1995–96 season, Demers was fired, which reportedly came as a surprise to him.

While in Tampa Bay, he was responsible for guiding Vincent Lecavalier through his first two years in the NHL. He displayed a fatherly attitude toward the young star, often pulling him aside during practice to lecture him in their native French. During the 1998–99 season, he also served as the Lightning's general manager.

In 2007, he was named the 100th most influential personality in hockey by The Hockey News.

In 1,317 games coached professionally (WHA/NHL), he went 553–612–152 and went to the postseason eleven times.

== Coaching record ==
=== WHA/NHL ===
Team	Year	Regular season						Postseason			
Team	Year	G	W	L	T	Pts	Finish	W	L	Win %	Result
IND	1975–76	75	34	35	6	74	1st in East	3	4	.429	Lost in WHA Quarterfinals (NEW)
IND	1976–77	81	36	37	8	80	3rd in East	5	4	.556	Lost in Division Finals (QUE)
CIN	1977–78	75	33	39	3	(69)	(fired)	—	—	—	—
QUE	1978–79	80	41	34	5	87	2nd in WHA	0	4	.000	Lost in WHA Semifinals (WPG)
QUE	1979–80	80	25	44	11	61	5th in Adams	—	—	—	Missed playoffs
STL	1983–84	80	32	41	7	71	2nd in Norris	6	5	.545	Lost in division finals (MIN)
STL	1984–85	80	37	31	12	86	1st in Norris	0	3	.000	Lost in division semifinals (MIN)
STL	1985–86	80	37	34	9	83	3rd in Norris	10	9	.526	Lost in Conference finals (CGY)
STL total		240	106	106	28	240		16	17	.485	3 playoff appearances
DET	1986–87	80	34	36	10	78	2nd in Norris	9	7	.563	Lost in Conference finals (EDM)
DET	1987–88	80	41	28	11	93	1st in Norris	9	7	.563	Lost in Conference finals (EDM)
DET	1988–89	80	34	34	12	80	1st in Norris	2	4	.333	Lost in Division semifinals (CHI)
DET	1989–90	80	28	38	14	70	5th in Norris	—	—	—	Missed playoffs
DET total		320	137	136	47	321		20	18	.526	3 playoff appearances
MTL	1992–93	84	48	30	6	102	3rd in Adams	16	4	.800	Won Stanley Cup (LAK)
MTL	1993–94	84	41	29	14	96	3rd in Northeast	3	4	.429	Lost in Conference quarterfinals (BOS)
MTL	1994–95	48	18	23	7	43	6th in Northeast	—	—	—	Missed playoffs
MTL	1995–96	5	0	5	0	(0)	(fired)	—	—	—	—
MTL total		220	107	86	27	241		19	8	.704	2 playoff appearances
TB	1997–98	63	15	40	8	(44)	7th in Atlantic	—	—	—	Missed playoffs
TB	1998–99	82	19	54	9	47	4th in Southeast	—	—	—	Missed playoffs
TB total		147	34	96	17						
WHA Total		311	144	145	22	310	1 division title	8	12	.400	3 playoff appearances
NHL Total		1,006	409	467	130	954	3 division titles	55	43	.561	8 playoff appearances 1 Stanley Cup
Total		1,317	553	612	152	1264	4 division titles	63	55	.534	11 playoff appearances

=== AHL ===
Team	Year	Regular season						Postseason
Team	Year	G	W	L	T	Pts	Finish	Result
FRE	1981–82	80	20	55	5	45	5th in North	Missed playoffs
FRE	1982–83	80	45	27	8	98	1st in North	Won in division semifinals (4-2 vs. ADK); Lost in division finals (2-4 vs. MNE)
Total		160	65	82	13	143	1 division title	0 Calder Cups (6-6, 0.500)

== Literacy struggles ==
On 2 November 2005, Demers released a biography, written by Mario Leclerc, entitled En toutes lettres (English translation: All Spelled Out), in which he revealed that he is functionally illiterate. According to Demers, he never really learned to read or write because of his abusive childhood in Montreal. He covered for himself by asking secretaries and public relations people to read letters for him, claiming he could not read English well enough to understand them (though he speaks English and French equally well). When he served as general manager of the Lightning, he brought in Cliff Fletcher and Jay Feaster as his assistants; as it turned out, they did most of the work a general manager would normally do because Demers knew he could not do it himself. Only his wife really knew about his struggles, with even the youngest of Demers' four children not even knowing about his father's troubles.

== Political career ==
On 28 August 2009, CBC Radio One reported that Demers was chosen to fill the Senate seat of Yoine Goldstein by Prime Minister Harper. According to the CBC report, he has "raised awareness about literacy issues" by "going public with his own struggles." A series of Montreal residents were interviewed regarding his Senate appointment and they were generally positive about the move. Many noted, however, that it was "important that he learn to read."

Demers served in the Senate until reaching the mandatory retirement age of 75 on 25 August 2019.

== Health ==
On 5 July 2010, Demers was reported to be in stable condition after undergoing two emergency surgeries.

Demers was hospitalized after experiencing a stroke in April 2016. He remained in stable condition in a Montreal hospital.

In October 2016, Demers was hospitalized for a serious infection.

Since his 2016 stroke, he has been living with aphasia.

== Honours ==
- In 2010, he was elected as an inaugural inductee into the World Hockey Association Hall of Fame in the coaching category.
- In 2014, Demers was named the Honorary Lieutenant-Colonel of the Canadian Grenadier Guards, a Montreal-based, Canadian Army Primary Reserve infantry unit.

Preceded by Maurice Filion	Head coach of the Quebec Nordiques; 1978–80	Succeeded by Maurice Filion
Preceded by Barclay Plager	Head coach of the St. Louis Blues; 1983–86	Succeeded by Jacques Martin
Preceded by Brad Park	Head coach of the Detroit Red Wings; 1986–90	Succeeded by Bryan Murray
Preceded by Pat Burns	Head coach of the Montreal Canadiens; 1992–95	Succeeded by Mario Tremblay
Preceded by Rick Paterson	Head coach of the Tampa Bay Lightning; 1997–99	Succeeded by Steve Ludzik
Preceded by Phil Esposito	General Manager of the Tampa Bay Lightning; 1998–99	Succeeded by Rick Dudley
