= Jon Cooper =

Canadian-American ice hockey coach (born 1967)

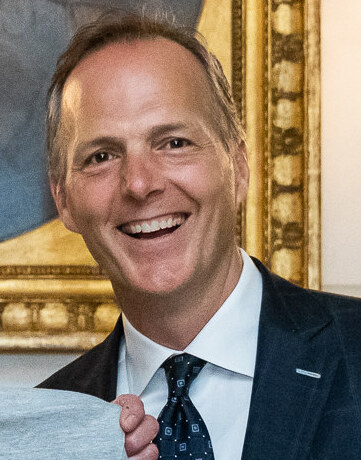
- Cooper at the White House in April 2022
- Born: August 23, 1967 (age 59) Prince George, British Columbia, Canada
- Current NHL coach: Tampa Bay Lightning
- Coaching career: 2001–present

Jonathan D. Cooper (born August 23, 1967) is a Canadian professional ice hockey coach who is the head coach for the Tampa Bay Lightning of the National Hockey League (NHL). Cooper's team won back-to-back Stanley Cup championships in 2020 and 2021 and he also reached the Stanley Cup Final in 2015 and 2022 as the Lightning head coach. He is the longest-tenured head coach in the NHL. Following the 2025–26 season, Cooper was awarded the Jack Adams Award, recognizing him as the NHL coach who contributed the most to his team's success during the regular season.

== Early life ==
Cooper was born in Prince George, British Columbia. He played high school hockey at Notre Dame in Wilcox, Saskatchewan. He graduated with a Bachelor of Business Administration from Hofstra University (Hempstead, New York) in 1989. Despite his prior lacrosse experience being that of the box variety, he was a field lacrosse letterman in each of the first four years of John Danowski's tenure as the varsity program's head coach. An attackman who eventually transitioned into a midfielder, Cooper scored 74 goals with 25 assists for 99 points and was a member of East Coast Conference championship teams as a junior and senior. He also played one year of hockey during his time at Hofstra.

He graduated from Thomas M. Cooley Law School in Lansing, Michigan. Cooper practiced law for five years and was a public defender off and on for two years while maintaining his private practice. Cooper started playing hockey again while attending law school, which led to his first experience coaching hockey at Lansing Catholic High School.

== Coaching career ==
=== Junior teams ===
Cooper began his coaching career in 1999–2000 with Lansing Catholic High School and led the team to its first regional hockey championship in 25 years. The following season (2000–01) he served as an assistant with the Capital Centre Pride of the North American Hockey League, the only time during his coaching career Cooper was an assistant. During the 2001–02 season, Cooper was the head coach of the Metro Jets in the North American 3 Hockey League and led the Jets to the Silver Cup – the USA Hockey National Junior B Championship. In 2002–03, Cooper coached the Honeybaked Midget Major AAA team.

In 2003, Cooper returned to the North American Hockey League (NAHL) to coach the expansion Texarkana Bandits. In 2004–05 he was named the NAHL Coach of the Year after leading the Bandits to a 36-15-5 record. Cooper continued with the Bandits franchise when it relocated to St. Louis in 2006–07. During the 2006–07 season, the Bandits captured the Robertson Cup as league champion. The following season the Bandits would once again capture the Robertson Cup. Additionally, Cooper won his second NAHL Coach of the Year that season. Cooper spent a total of five seasons coaching in the NAHL before moving on to coach the Green Bay Gamblers of the United States Hockey League. In his five seasons coaching the Bandits franchise in the NAHL, Cooper compiled an overall record of 198–74–18.

Cooper was the coach of the United States Hockey League (USHL)'s Green Bay Gamblers starting in 2008. He led the team in 2008–09 and 2009–10 to a combined record of 84–27–9. In 2010, the team won the Clark Cup for the League's championship and Cooper was named USHL Coach of the Year. He is the only coach to win a championship in all three tiers of junior hockey in the United States.

=== AHL years ===
In 2010, Cooper was hired by the Tampa Bay Lightning to coach the Norfolk Admirals, the team's American Hockey League (AHL) affiliate. During the 2011–12 season, the Admirals won the Calder Cup as the AHL's champions. The Admirals also set a North American professional hockey record for the longest regular season winning streak at 28 games in a row. Additionally, Cooper won the 2012 Louis A. R. Pieri Memorial Award as the AHL's most outstanding head coach.

For the 2012–13 season, Cooper became the head coach of the Syracuse Crunch after the Lightning changed their AHL affiliation. In 65 games with the Crunch, Cooper led the team to a 39–18–3–5 record, the best in the AHL at the time of his promotion.

=== Tampa Bay Lightning ===
On March 25, 2013, towards the end of the lockout-shortened 2012–13 season, following the dismissal of head coach Guy Boucher, the Tampa Bay Lightning announced that Cooper would become head coach.

After leading the Lightning to their best season in franchise history in points (108) and wins (50) in 2014–15, Cooper coached the Tampa Bay Lightning to their second Prince of Wales Trophy as the Eastern Conference champion. The Lightning lost to the Chicago Blackhawks in six games in the 2015 Stanley Cup Final.

On March 22, 2016, Cooper recorded his 143rd win as the Lightning's head coach. The win moved Cooper past Terry Crisp for second all-time in wins in franchise history. In the 2016 playoffs, Cooper coached the Lightning to another deep playoff run by defeating the Detroit Red Wings in five games in the first round for the second consecutive time and the New York Islanders and then losing in seven games to the Pittsburgh Penguins in the conference finals, one win short from back-to-back appearances in the Stanley Cup Final.

On November 8, 2017, Cooper recorded his 200th career win as head coach of the Lightning. Cooper joined John Tortorella as the only coaches in franchise history to record 200 wins. On January 7, 2018, Cooper was named as head coach of the Atlantic Division for the 63rd National Hockey League All-Star Game, which was played at Amalie Arena in Tampa, Florida. The selection was because the Lightning were the team with the highest points percentage in the Atlantic Division. On March 30, Cooper recorded his 240th career NHL win against the New York Rangers at Madison Square Garden. The win moved Cooper past John Tortorella for most wins in franchise history. After securing the top seed in the East for the 2017–18 season, Cooper and the Lightning went on another lengthy playoff run by defeating the New Jersey Devils in the first round in five games and defeating the Boston Bruins in five games before losing in seven games to the Washington Capitals in the conference finals, one win away from the Stanley Cup Final.

On January 5, 2019, Cooper was named to the 2019 National Hockey League All-Star Game. This was Cooper's second consecutive selection to the NHL All-Star game. On March 18, Cooper coached the Lightning to their first Presidents' Trophy in franchise history with a victory over the visiting Arizona Coyotes at Amalie Arena. On March 21, Cooper recorded his 300th career NHL win in a 6–3 Lightning win over the Carolina Hurricanes at PNC Arena. On March 26, Cooper signed a multi-year contract extension to remain as the head coach of the Lightning. On April 1, Cooper coached the Lightning to their 60th win of the season. With the win, the Lightning became only the 3rd team in NHL history to reach the mark and Cooper became the second coach in NHL history to coach a team to 60 wins, joining Scotty Bowman. Tampa Bay went on to win 62 games during the 2018–19 season, tying the 1995–96 Detroit Red Wings for the most wins in a season in NHL history. The Lightning in the 2019 playoffs were swept in the first round by the eighth seeded Columbus Blue Jackets, making them the first team to win the Presidents' Trophy and not win a single postseason game in the same year.

On September 28, 2020, Cooper led the Lightning to franchise's second Stanley Cup, when they beat the Dallas Stars in six games in the 2020 Stanley Cup Final. Cooper stated after the win that the team drew inspiration from the Virginia Cavaliers men's basketball program. Similar to the Lightning's playoff defeat in 2019, top-seeded Virginia was defeated in their opening game by a 16th seed in the 2018 national tournament, the first such occurrence of a 16 vs. 1 upset in the history of the NCAA Division I men's basketball tournament. One year later, Virginia won the national championship.

On May 30, 2021, Cooper coached the Lightning to a 2–1 win over the Carolina Hurricanes at PNC Arena in his 100th career NHL playoff game. On July 7, Cooper led the reigning champions to the Lightning's third Stanley Cup when they beat the Montreal Canadiens in five games. Cooper was the first coach to win back-to-back Stanley Cups since Mike Sullivan accomplished this feat with the Pittsburgh Penguins winning in 2016 and 2017.

On December 9, 2021, Cooper recorded his 400th career win in a victory over the Toronto Maple Leafs at Scotiabank Arena. Cooper set the record for the fewest games coached to reach 400 wins in NHL history, which came in his 659th game. On April 1, 2022, Cooper coached in his 700th career NHL game. His 426 wins at the time of reaching the milestone are the most in NHL history among head coaches through their first 700 games. Cooper and the Lightning eventually reached a third consecutive Stanley Cup Final, but lost in six games to the Colorado Avalanche.

In the years following the loss to the Avalanche, Cooper's Lightning would enjoy regular season success. On January 9, 2024, Cooper recorded his 500th NHL win in a 3–2 overtime game over the Los Angeles Kings. However, success in the postseason was elusive, with losses to the Toronto Maple Leafs in the first round of the 2023 Stanley Cup playoffs and then consecutive first round defeats to the Florida Panthers in 2024 and 2025. On January 12, 2026, Cooper recorded his 600th NHL win with a 5–1 win over the Philadelphia Flyers. The 2025–26 regular season was another success for the Lightning, who finished second in the division, and Cooper was a Jack Adams Award finalist for the third time. He finished first in balloting, 3 points clear of Buffalo Sabres coach Lindy Ruff. Upon being presented with the trophy, Cooper admitted that he "never thought this day would come." The Lightning were ousted in the first round of the playoffs for the fourth time in a row, on this occasion by the Canadiens.

=== International ===
On November 13, 2015, Team North America general manager, Peter Chiarelli, named Cooper as an assistant coach for the 2016 World Cup of Hockey under Team North America head coach Todd McLellan.

On April 11, 2017, Hockey Canada named Cooper as the head coach of Canada's men's national team for the 2017 World Championship tournament. Cooper was joined by assistant coaches Gerard Gallant, Dave Hakstol, and Dave King. On May 21, Cooper coached Canada to a silver medal who lost to Sweden 2–1 in a shootout.

On August 9, 2021, Cooper was named head coach of Canada for the 2022 Winter Olympics, but ultimately did not participate when the NHL pulled out of the competition because of the omicron variant in the COVID-19 pandemic.

On June 25, 2024, Cooper was named the head coach of Canada for both the NHL 4 Nations Face-Off, won by Canada, and the 2026 Winter Olympics, Canada received silver medals in the Winter Olympics when they lost to the United States 2–1 in overtime.

== Personal life ==
Cooper is a dual citizen of the United States and Canada. Cooper's mother, Christine was a resident San Francisco, California, while his father, Robert was a resident of Prince George. Growing up, Cooper's family were fans of the Toronto Maple Leafs. Cooper and his wife, Jessie, have twin daughters and a son.

On September 16, 2016, the creation of the annual Coop's Catch for Kids charity fishing tournament was announced. The tournament supports pediatric cancer research and patient services via The Lightning Foundation and Jon Cooper's family foundation, the J5 Foundation. Each year, anglers are treated to an exciting day of fishing and fundraising alongside Lightning players, coaches, and alumni. The annual catch-and-release inshore grand slam tournament pairs Lightning celebrities on a guided boat with two participants. The inaugural event was held on October 11, 2016, and to date has raised over $1,000,000 to support the fight against pediatric cancer.

== Head coaching record ==
=== NHL ===
Team	Year	Regular season						Postseason			
Team	Year	G	W	L	OTL	Pts	Finish	W	L	Win%	Result
TBL	2012–13*	16	5	8	3	(13)	4th in Southeast	—	—	—	Missed playoffs
TBL	2013–14	82	46	27	9	101	2nd in Atlantic	0	4	.000	Lost in first round (MTL)
TBL	2014–15	82	50	24	8	108	2nd in Atlantic	14	12	.538	Lost in Stanley Cup Final (CHI)
TBL	2015–16	82	46	31	5	97	2nd in Atlantic	11	6	.647	Lost in conference finals (PIT)
TBL	2016–17	82	42	30	10	94	5th in Atlantic	—	—	—	Missed playoffs
TBL	2017–18	82	54	23	5	113	1st in Atlantic	11	6	.647	Lost in conference finals (WSH)
TBL	2018–19	82	62	16	4	128	1st in Atlantic	0	4	.000	Lost in first round (CBJ)
TBL	2019–20	70	43	21	6	92	2nd in Atlantic	18	7	.720	Won Stanley Cup (DAL)
TBL	2020–21	56	36	17	3	75	3rd in Central	16	7	.696	Won Stanley Cup (MTL)
TBL	2021–22	82	51	23	8	110	3rd in Atlantic	14	9	.609	Lost in Stanley Cup Final (COL)
TBL	2022–23	82	46	30	6	98	3rd in Atlantic	2	4	.333	Lost in first round (TOR)
TBL	2023–24	82	45	29	8	98	4th in Atlantic	1	4	.200	Lost in first round (FLA)
TBL	2024–25	82	47	27	8	102	2nd in Atlantic	1	4	.200	Lost in first round (FLA)
TBL	2025–26	82	50	26	6	106	2nd in Atlantic	3	4	.429	Lost in first round (MTL)
Total		1,043	622	332	89			91	71	.562	12 playoff appearances 2 Stanley Cup titles

* – mid-season replacement

=== AHL ===
Team	Year	Regular season						Postseason			
Team	Year	G	W	L	OTL	Pts	Finish	W	L	Win%	Result
NOR	2010–11	80	39	26	15	93	4th in East Division	2	4	.333	Lost in first round (WBS)
NOR	2011–12	76	55	18	3	113	1st in East Division	15	3	.833	Won Calder Cup (TOR)
SYR	2012–13*	65	39	18	8	86	1st in East Division	—	—	—	Promoted to Tampa Bay
Total		221	133	62	26			17	7	.708	2 playoff appearances 1 Calder Cup title

* – promoted to Tampa Bay on March 25, 2013

== Coaching honours ==
- Stanley Cup champion (NHL): 2020, 2021
- NHL All-Star Game (NHL): 2018, 2019
- Jack Adams Award: 2025–26
- Calder Cup champion: 2011–12
- Pieri Memorial Award: 2011–12
- USHL Coach of the Year: 2009–10
- Clark Cup (USHL): 2009–10
- Robertson Cup (NAHL): 2006–07, 2007–08
- NAHL coach of the year: 2007–08, 2004–05
- 4 Nations Face-Off champion: 2025

Sporting positions
Preceded by Guy Boucher	Head coach of the Tampa Bay Lightning; 2013–present	Incumbent
Awards and achievements
Preceded by Spencer Carbery	Jack Adams Award winner 2026	Succeeded by Most recent
