= Yoine Goldstein =

Canadian lawyer, academic, and politician (1934–2020)

The Honourable Yoine J. Goldstein

Senator for Rigaud senate division
- In office August 29, 2005 – May 11, 2009
- Appointed by: Paul Martin
- Preceded by: Gérald Beaudoin
- Succeeded by: Jacques Demers

Personal details
- Born: May 11, 1934 Montreal, Quebec
- Died: March 18, 2020 (aged 85) Montreal, Quebec
- Party: Liberal
- Spouse: Elaine
- Children: 2
- Occupation: Lawyer

Yoine J. Goldstein (May 11, 1934 – March 18, 2020) was a Canadian lawyer, academic, and former Senator.

Born in Montreal, Quebec, his education includes a Bachelor of Arts from McGill University in 1955, a Bachelor of Civil Law (with honours) from McGill University in 1958 (where he was selected as the Articles Editor for the McGill Law Journal), and a Doctor of Laws from the Université de Lyon in 1960. He was called to the Quebec Bar in 1961. He specializes in insolvency, bankruptcy and commercial litigation. Prior to becoming a senator, he was a senior and managing partner of the Montreal law firm, Goldstein, Flanz & Fishman.

From 1973 until 1997, he was a lecturer at the Faculty of Law of the Université de Montréal. He is a Fellow of the American College of Trial Lawyers and the American College of Bankruptcy. In 1992, he received the Lord Reading Law Society Human Rights Award, and the Lord Reading Law Society Service Award in 1998.

Active in Montreal's Jewish community, he was president of Federation CJA (a funding, planning, and coordinating body of services for some of the 93,000 Jews in Montreal) from 1995 to 1997. He is also a member of the Community Advisory Board of the Concordia University Chair of Canadian Jewish Studies.

== Senate career ==
On August 29, 2005, he was appointed to the Senate on the advice of Paul Martin and sat as a member of the Liberal caucus.

He was vice-chairman of the Banking, Trade and Commerce committee and the Standing Committee on Banking, Trade and Commerce.

During the 40th Canadian Parliament he introduced the following bills: S-219: An Act to amend the Bankruptcy and Insolvency Act (student loans), S-220: An Act respecting commercial electronic messages, S-231: An Act to amend the Investment Canada Act (human rights violations), and S-232: An Act to amend the Patent Act (drugs for international humanitarian purposes) and to make a consequential amendment to another Act.

He retired, per Senate rules, on May 11, 2009, his 75th birthday. He died on March 18, 2020.
