= List of Tampa Bay Lightning head coaches =

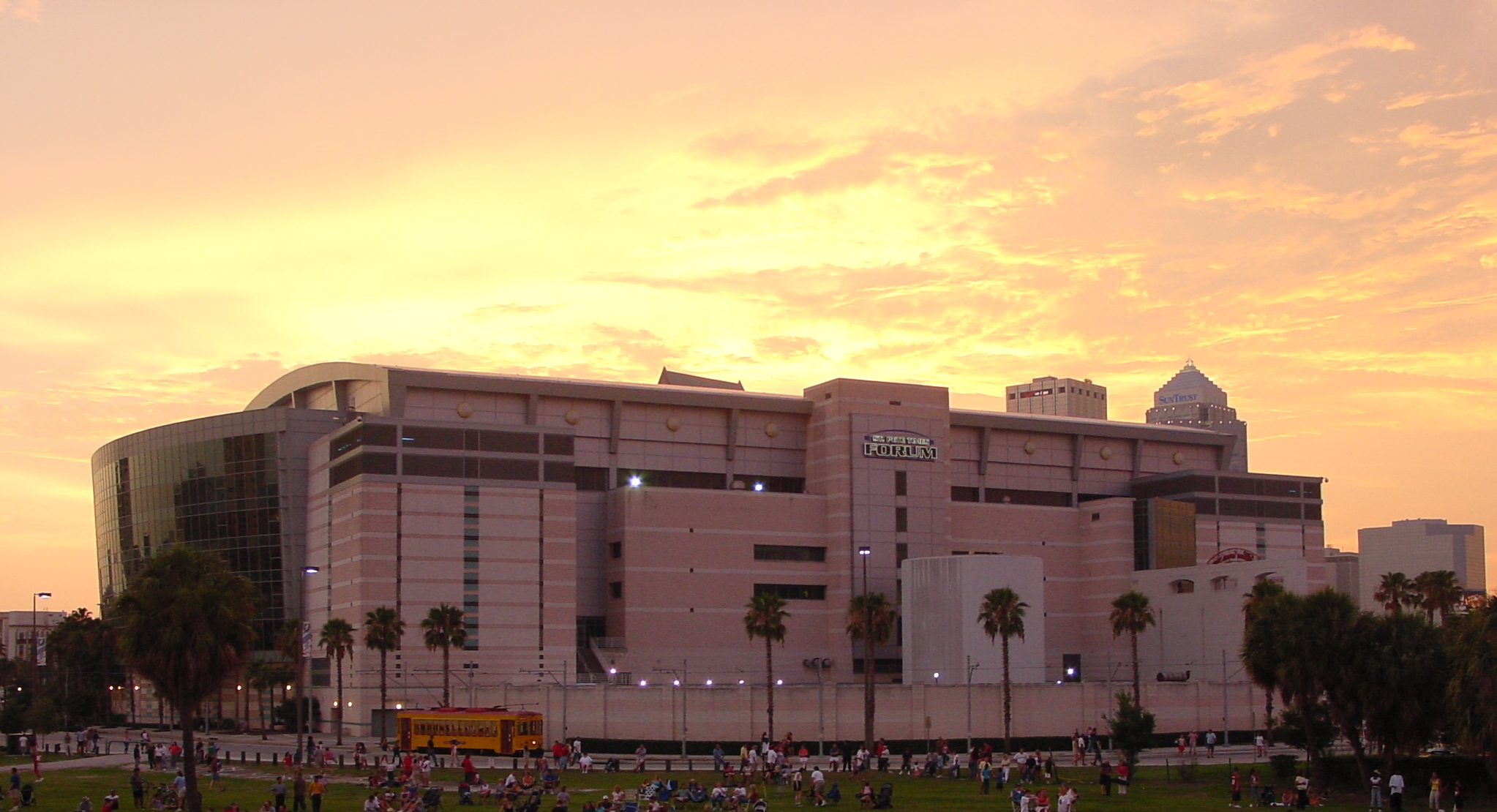
The Lightning have played their home games at Benchmark International Arena since 1996.

The Tampa Bay Lightning are an American professional ice hockey team based in Tampa, Florida. They play in the Atlantic Division of the Eastern Conference in the National Hockey League (NHL). Often referred to as the Bolts, the team joined the NHL in 1992 as an expansion team, and have won the Stanley Cup championship in 2004, 2020 and 2021. Having first played in the Expo Hall, and later in the ThunderDome (now known as Tropicana Field), the Lightning have played their home games at the Ice Palace, currently titled Benchmark International Arena, since 1996. The Lightning are owned by Jeffrey Vinik, Julien BriseBois is their general manager, and Victor Hedman is the team captain.

There have been nine head coaches for the Lightning franchise. The team's first head coach was Terry Crisp, who coached for five seasons. John Tortorella, the only American to head coach the team, was the first Lightning coach to have won the Prince of Wales Trophy, the Stanley Cup, and to have been awarded the Jack Adams Award, all of which happened in the 2003–04 season. Rick Paterson, Steve Ludzik and Jon Cooper are the only ones who have spent their entire NHL head coaching careers with the Lightning.

Jon Cooper is the team's current head coach, having been named to the position on March 25, 2013. Cooper is the only head coach of the Lightning to win the Prince of Wales Trophy four times. Under Cooper, the franchise won its second Stanley Cup championship in 2020 and third championship in 2021. Cooper is the franchise's all-time leader for the most regular season wins (572), playoff games coached (155), and the most playoff-games won (888).

== Key ==
#	Number of coaches^{[a]}
GC	Games coached
W	Wins = 2 points
L	Losses = 0 points
T	Ties = 1 point
OT	Overtime/shootout losses = 1 point^{[b]}
PTS	Points
Win%	Winning percentage
*	Spent entire NHL head coaching career with the Lightning

== Coaches ==
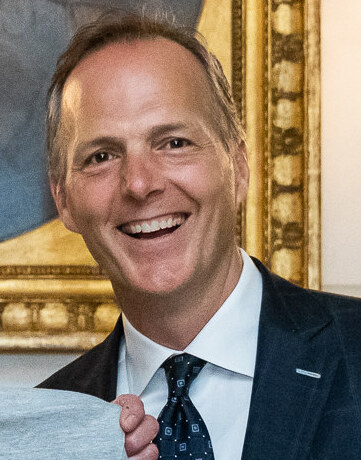
Jon Cooper has been head coach since 2013

Note: Statistics are correct through the end of the 2025–26 NHL season.

Head coaches of the Tampa Bay Lightning
#	Name	Term^{[c]}	Regular season						Playoffs				Achievements	Reference
#	Name	Term^{[c]}	GC	W	L	T/OT	PTS	PTS%	GC	W	L	Win%	Achievements	Reference
1	Terry Crisp	1992–1998	391	142	204	45	329	.421	6	2	4	.333		
2	Rick Paterson*	1998	6	0	6	0	0	.000	—	—	—	—		
3	Jacques Demers	1998–1999	147	34	96	17	85	.289	—	—	—	—		
4	Steve Ludzik*	1999–2001	121	31	67	23	85	.351	—	—	—	—		
5	John Tortorella	2001–2008	535	239	222	74	552	.516	45	24	21	.533	Stanley Cup championship: 2004; Jack Adams Award winner: 2003–04; Prince of Wales Trophy winner: 2004	
6	Barry Melrose	2008	16	5	7	4	14	.438	—	—	—	—		
7	Rick Tocchet	2008–2010	148	53	69	26	132	.446	—	—	—	—		
8	Guy Boucher	2010–2013	196	97	79	20	214	.546	18	11	7	.611		
9	Jon Cooper*	2013–present	1043	622	322	89	1,333	.645	162	91	71	.562	NHL All-Star Game: 2018, 2019; Jack Adams Award winner: 2025–26; Presidents' Trophy winner: 2018–19; Stanley Cup championship: 2020, 2021; Prince of Wales Trophy winner: 2015, 2020, 2021, 2022	

== Notes ==
- ^{a} A running total of the number of coaches of the Lightning. Thus, any coach who has two or more separate terms as head coach is only counted once.
- ^{b} Before the 2005–06 season, the NHL instituted a penalty shootout for regular season games that remained tied after a five-minute overtime period, which prevented ties.
- ^{c} Each year is linked to an article about that particular NHL season.
