= Steve Ludzik =

Canadian ice hockey player, coach, and television analyst

- Born: April 3, 1961 (age 65) Etobicoke, Ontario, Canada
- Height: 5 ft 11 in (180 cm)
- Weight: 185 lb (84 kg; 13 st 3 lb)
- Position: Centre
- Shot: Left
- Played for: Chicago Blackhawks; Buffalo Sabres; EK Zell am See
- NHL draft: 28th overall, 1980; Chicago Black Hawks
- Playing career: 1981–1993

Stephen Paul Ludzik (born April 3, 1961) is a Canadian former professional ice hockey player and coach who has worked as a television analyst for The Score television network. He played in the National Hockey League for the Chicago Blackhawks and Buffalo Sabres between 1981 and 1990. He later coached the Tampa Bay Lightning between 1999 and 2001, and also spent several years coaching in the minor leagues.

== Biography ==
As a youth, Ludzik played in the 1974 Quebec International Pee-Wee Hockey Tournament with a minor ice hockey team from Toronto.

He had a distinguished junior career with the Niagara Falls Flyers of the Ontario Hockey League, amassing 125 goals and 233 assists, for a total of 358 points. This broke the career point total record for the Flyers, which still stands today. He was subsequently named to the Flyers' All-Time Five Man All-Star Team.

He was drafted 28th overall by the Chicago Black Hawks in the 1980 NHL Entry Draft. After one more year of junior hockey, Ludzik turned pro in 1981–82. He split that season between the Black Hawks and the American Hockey League's New Brunswick Hawks. The next season, he became a Black Hawk regular.

Ludzik played with the Black Hawks until the 1988–89 season. Except for 11 games with the Buffalo Sabres in 1989–90, he spent the rest of his playing career in the minors. He played in a total of 424 NHL games and scored 46 goals and 93 assists.

== Coaching ==
After retiring as a player, Ludzik turned to coaching, starting in the IHL with the Muskegon Fury and then the Detroit Vipers, where he won the 1996–97 Turner Cup with General Manager Rick Dudley. He then spent two years as head coach of the Tampa Bay Lightning, but was let go after the 2000–01 season. He subsequently went to the OHL as head coach of the Mississauga IceDogs, and then to the AHL, where he ended his coaching career in 2004–05 with the San Antonio Rampage.

== Career statistics ==
=== Regular season and playoffs ===
			Regular season					Playoffs
Season	Team	League	GP	G	A	Pts	PIM	GP	G	A	Pts	PIM
1977–78	Markham Waxers	OJPHL	31	30	20	50	15	—	—	—	—	—
1978–79	Niagara Falls Flyers	OMJHL	68	32	65	97	138	20	7	17	24	48
1979–80	Niagara Falls Flyers	OMJHL	67	43	76	119	102	10	6	6	12	16
1980–81	Niagara Falls Flyers	OHL	58	50	92	142	108	12	5	9	14	40
1981–82	Chicago Black Hawks	NHL	8	2	1	3	2	—	—	—	—	—
1981–82	New Brunswick Hawks	AHL	73	21	41	62	142	15	3	7	10	6
1982–83	Chicago Black Hawks	NHL	66	6	19	25	63	13	3	5	8	20
1983–84	Chicago Black Hawks	NHL	80	9	20	29	73	4	0	1	1	9
1984–85	Chicago Black Hawks	NHL	79	11	20	31	86	15	1	1	2	16
1985–86	Chicago Black Hawks	NHL	49	6	5	11	21	3	0	0	0	12
1986–87	Chicago Blackhawks	NHL	52	5	12	17	34	4	0	0	0	0
1987–88	Chicago Blackhawks	NHL	73	6	15	21	40	5	0	1	1	13
1988–89	Chicago Blackhawks	NHL	6	1	0	1	8	—	—	—	—	—
1988–89	Saginaw Hawks	IHL	65	21	57	78	129	6	0	1	1	16
1989–90	Buffalo Sabres	NHL	11	0	1	1	6	—	—	—	—	—
1989–90	Rochester Americans	AHL	54	25	29	54	71	16	5	6	11	57
1990–91	Rochester Americans	AHL	65	22	29	51	137	8	3	5	8	6
1991–92	Rochester Americans	AHL	45	6	22	28	88	14	2	1	3	8
1992–93	EK Zell am See	AUT	51	17	36	53	64	—	—	—	—	—
NHL totals			424	46	93	139	333	44	4	8	12	70

=== NHL coaching career ===
Team	Year	Regular season							Post season
Team	Year	G	W	L	T	OTL	Pts	Division rank	Result
Tampa Bay Lightning	1999–00	82	19	47	9	7	54	4th in Southeast	Missed playoffs
Tampa Bay Lightning	2000–01	39	12	20	5	2	29	5th in Southeast	fired
Total		123	31	67	14	9			

=== Other leagues ===
Team	Year	League	Regular season							Postseason			
Team	Year	League	G	W	L	T	OTL	Pts	Finish	W	L	Win%	Result
Muskegon Fury	1993–94	CoHL	64	35	24	5	—	75	2nd in West	0	3	.000	Lost in Quarterfinals
Muskegon Fury	1994–95	CoHL	74	42	27	5	—	89	2nd in West	10	6	.625	Lost in Colonial Cup Final
Detroit Vipers	1996–97	IHL	82	57	17	—	8	122	1st in North	15	6	.714	Won Turner Cup
Detroit Vipers	1997–98	IHL	82	47	20	—	15	109	1st in Northeast	14	9	.609	Lost in Turner Cup Final
Detroit Vipers	1998–99	IHL	82	50	21	—	11	111	1st in Northeast	6	5	.545	Lost in Semifinals
Mississauga IceDogs	2002–03	OHL	68	23	31	11	3	60	4th in Central	1	4	.200	Lost in Conference Quarterfinals
San Antonio Rampage	2003–04	AHL	12	8	3	1	—	17	Named Florida Panthers assistant coach	—	—	—	—
San Antonio Rampage	2004–05	AHL	80	27	45	—	8	62	6th in West	—	—	—	Missed playoffs

== Broadcasting and publishing ==
Since coaching, Ludzik has been a hockey pundit on television, most notably on The Score Television Network. He also co-authored a book, entitled "Been There, Done That". Ludzik also cohosts a weekend program on CKTB in St Catharines.

== Parkinson's disease ==
Ludzik came public in 2012 that he has Parkinson's disease and was diagnosed in 2000.

Preceded by Bruce Boudreau	Head coach of the Muskegon Fury; 1993–95	Succeeded by Bill Stewart
Preceded by Rick Dudley	Head coach of the Detroit Vipers; 1996–99	Succeeded by Paulin Bordeleau
Preceded by Jacques Demers	Head coach of the Tampa Bay Lightning; 1999–2001	Succeeded by John Tortorella
Preceded by Don Cherry	Head coach of the Mississauga IceDogs; 2002–03	Succeeded by Greg Gilbert
Preceded by Scott Allen; Scott Allen	Head coach of the San Antonio Rampage; 2003; 2004–05	Succeeded by Scott Allen; Pat Conacher
