= Guy Boucher =

Canadian professional ice hockey coach (born 1971)

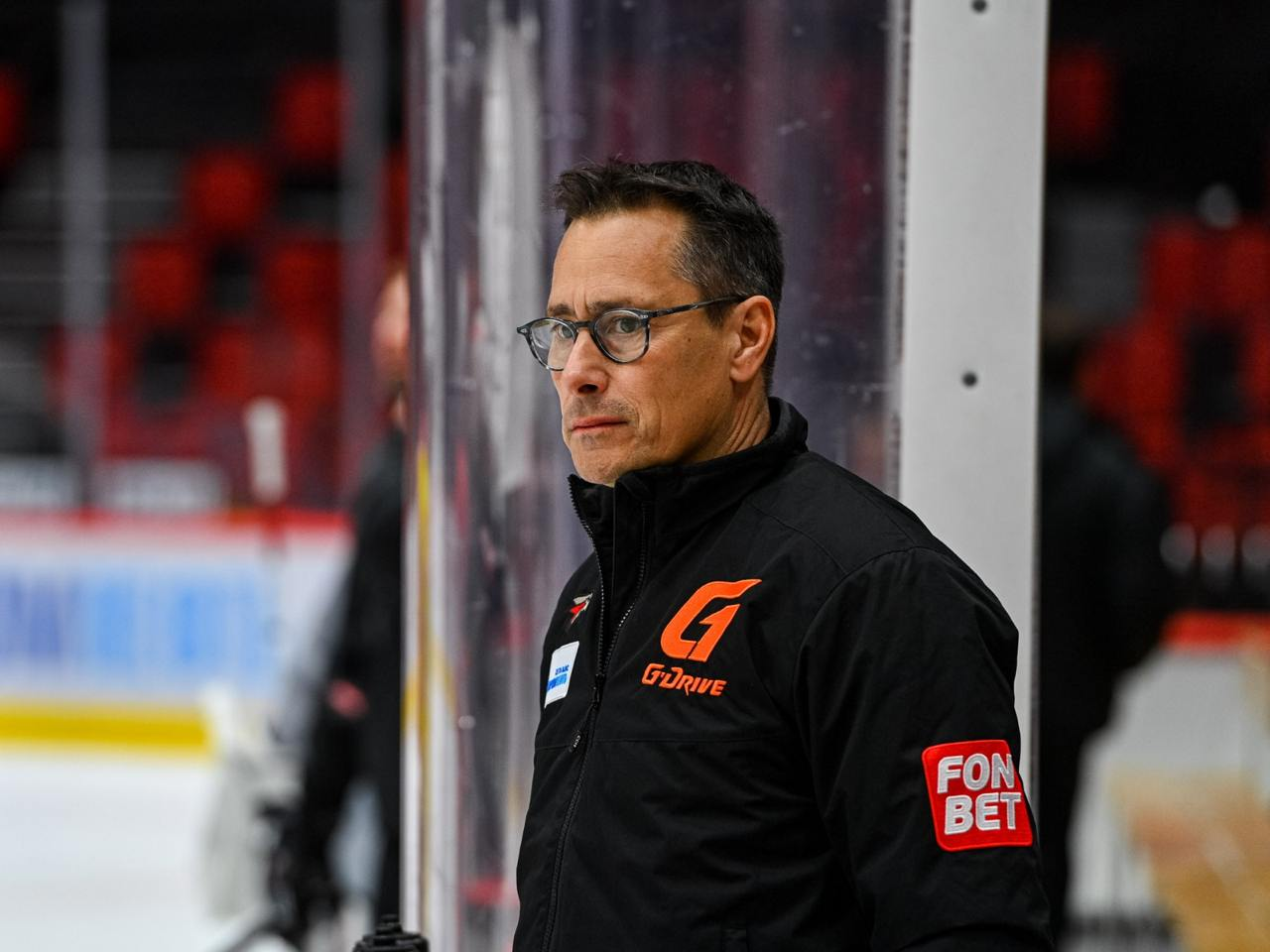
- Boucher in December 2024
- Born: August 3, 1971 (age 55) Notre-Dame-du-Lac, Quebec, Canada
- Current KHL coach: Avangard Omsk
- Coached for: SC Bern; Tampa Bay Lightning; Ottawa Senators
- Coaching career: 1997–present

Guy Boucher (born August 3, 1971) is a Canadian professional ice hockey coach who is the head coach for Avangard Omsk of the Kontinental Hockey League (KHL). Boucher is the former head coach of the Tampa Bay Lightning and Ottawa Senators of the National Hockey League (NHL). He was also the head coach of SC Bern in the 2014–15 season. He previously coached in the Quebec Major Junior Hockey League (QMJHL). He has coached various Canadian international teams, and worked as a commentator for RDS.

== Playing years ==
Before his coaching years, Boucher played right wing with the McGill Redmen between 1991 and 1995. He graduated with an arts degree (history and environmental biology) in 1995 and an engineering degree (agricultural engineering) in 1996. He also holds a master's in sports psychology at the University of Montreal. In 1995–96, Boucher played in France for Viry-Essonne where he scored 16 goals and 38 points in 27 games.

== Coaching years ==
Boucher began his coaching career as assistant coach with the McGill Redmen under head coach Martin Raymond in 1996–97, then moved on to serve as an assistant coach with the Rouyn-Noranda Huskies of the Quebec Major Junior Hockey League (1997–2000) and then with the Rimouski Océanic from 2003 to 2006 with whom he won the Jean-Rougeau trophy (regular season champions) and President's Cup. He also participated in the Memorial Cup tournament. In between, he coached the Lac-Saint-Louis Lions of the AAA Midget Hockey League. He returned to the Quebec Major Junior Hockey League as the Drummondville Voltigeurs head coach in 2006. In the 2008–09, he guided the team to their best season in history, with a total of 54 wins and 112 points, capturing the President's Cup on his way to the Memorial Cup tournament once again. He won the Paul-Dumont Trophy, awarded to QMJHL's personality of the year.

On June 29, 2009, he was named head coach of the Montreal Canadiens's affiliate Hamilton Bulldogs in the AHL becoming the eighth head coach in Bulldogs franchise history. He led the team to an impressive 52–17–11 record for 115 points despite having many of his best players being called up by the Montreal Canadiens. At the end of the season, he won the Louis A. R. Pieri Memorial Award as coach of the year.

In June 2010, Boucher was offered the vacant head coaching position for the Columbus Blue Jackets, but turned it down to accept the head coaching position with the Tampa Bay Lightning. He developed a "1-3-1" defensive system at Tampa that led to a famous incident against the Philadelphia Flyers where the Flyers held back the puck in their defensive zone, refusing to advance, while the Lightning team waited and did not attack the puck carrier, leading to several minutes of no action. In his rookie year as an NHL head coach, Boucher led the Tampa Bay Lightning to game seven of the Eastern Conference final.

On March 24, 2013, the team's general manager Steve Yzerman fired Boucher following a 5–3 loss against the Ottawa Senators. At the time, Tampa Bay was in 14th place in the Eastern Conference.

On January 27, 2014, the Swiss ice hockey club SC Bern announced the signing of Guy Boucher as their head coach.

Boucher guided the team to the title in the 2014–15 Swiss Cup competition.

On November 18, 2015, Boucher was fired by SC Bern following a four-game losing streak and a ninth-place finish in the NLA.

On May 8, 2016, Boucher signed a three-year contract to become the head coach of the Ottawa Senators. With his hire, Boucher is the first person to coach both franchises from the 1992 expansion class. In his first season, the club advanced to the Eastern Conference final, losing in double overtime in game seven to the Pittsburgh Penguins.

In his second season, the team's performance nose-dived and it placed 30th out of 31 teams in the NHL.

On March 1, 2019, with the Senators in 31st place, Boucher was fired and associate coach Marc Crawford named as interim head coach.

On July 20, 2023, the Toronto Maple Leafs announced Boucher was signed to be an assistant coach for the 2023–24 season. On June 15, 2024, the Maple Leafs announced that Boucher won't return to the coaching staff for the 2024-25 season.

On November 27, 2024, Boucher signed a contract as a head coach of Russian team Avangard Omsk of KHL until the end of the 2025–26 season.

== International ==
Boucher worked as an assistant coach for Canada men's national U-18 ice hockey team in 2006, 2007 and 2008. In 2008, they won the gold medal at the U-18 world championships. In 2009, he served as an assistant coach with Canada men's national U-20 ice hockey team, which won its fifth consecutive gold medal at the World Junior Ice Hockey Championships. In 2014 and 2015, he coached Team Canada at the Spengler Cup, guiding the team to the title in 2015.

== Personal life ==
Guy Boucher was married to Marsha and the couple have three children together, twin daughters, Mila and Naomi, and a son, Vincent. Naomi played college ice hockey at Yale and was drafted by the New York Sirens in the 2026 PWHL Draft.

Boucher has a prominent scar on his right cheek. When asked how he received it, Boucher said "it is not hockey-related. I did not tell anybody back home, so it is like this little enigma. My kids do not even know." Guy Boucher's scar is often compared to the "Le Chiffre" character's scar in Casino Royale and Boucher is sometimes referred to as a "James Bond villain". He was spoofed as such on-air by Jay Onrait of the Canadian TSN sports television channel.

== Head coaching record ==
Team	Year	Regular season						Postseason			
Team	Year	G	W	L	OTL	Pts	Finish	W	L	Win %	Result
TBL	2010–11	82	46	25	11	103	2nd in Southeast	11	7	.611	Lost in conference finals (BOS)
TBL	2011–12	82	38	36	8	84	3rd in Southeast	—	—	—	Missed playoffs
TBL	2012–13	32	13	18	1	(27)	(fired)	—	—	—	—
TBL Total		196	97	79	20	—		11	7	.611	1 playoff appearance
OTT	2016–17	82	44	28	10	98	2nd in Atlantic	11	8	.579	Lost in conference finals (PIT)
OTT	2017–18	82	28	43	11	67	7th in Atlantic	—	—	—	Missed playoffs
OTT	2018–19	64	22	37	5	(49)	(fired)	—	—	—	—
OTT total		228	94	108	26	—		11	8	.579	1 playoff appearance
Total		424	191	187	46	—		22	15	.595	2 playoff appearances

Sporting positions
Preceded by Rick Tocchet	Head coach of the Tampa Bay Lightning; 2010–2013	Succeeded by Jon Cooper
Preceded by Dave Cameron	Head coach of the Ottawa Senators; 2016–2019	Succeeded by Marc Crawford (interim)
