= Hampton Roads Gulls =

- City: Hampton, VA
- League: Atlantic Coast Hockey League
- Founded: 1982
- Operated: 1982–83
- Home arena: Hampton Coliseum
- Colors: Black, Yellow
- Head coach: Pat Donnelly

Franchise history
- 1982–83: Hampton Roads Gulls

The Hampton Roads Gulls were a professional ice hockey team based in Hampton, VA. They were a member of the Atlantic Coast Hockey League in the 1982–83 season.

== Season-by-season results ==
Season	Games	Won	Lost	Tied	Points	GF	GA
1982–83	42	16	24	2	34	170	215

The Gulls ceased operations on February 2, 1983.

== Notable players ==
- Oren Koules, producer of Two And A Half Men and the Saw series of movies. Along with former NHL player Len Barrie, he owned the NHL's Tampa Bay Lightning from 2008 until 2010.
- John Tortorella, played one game with the Gulls during the 1982–83 AHL season. He won the Jack Adams Trophy and the Stanley Cup as the coach of the Tampa Bay Lightning.
