= Rick Paterson =

Canadian ice hockey player

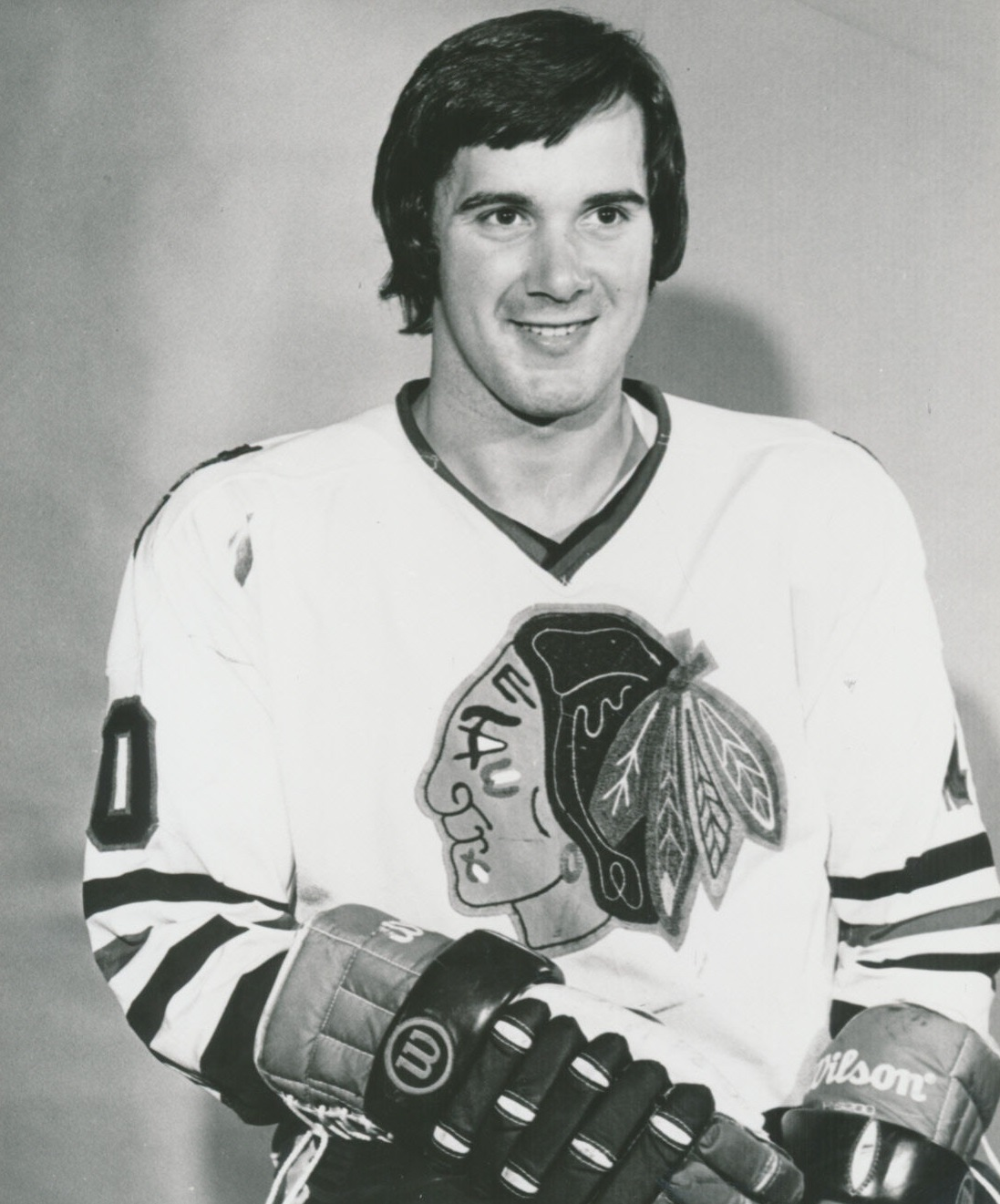
- Paterson in 1978
- Born: February 10, 1958 (age 68) Kingston, Ontario, Canada
- Height: 5 ft 9 in (175 cm)
- Weight: 190 lb (86 kg; 13 st 8 lb)
- Position: Right Wing
- Shot: Right
- Played for: Chicago Black Hawks
- NHL draft: 46th overall, 1978; Chicago Black Hawks
- Playing career: 1978–1988

David Rick Paterson (born February 10, 1958) is a Canadian former professional ice hockey player and coach. He played 430 games in the National Hockey League with the Chicago Black Hawks from 1979 through 1987. After leaving Chicago, he worked as Assistant Coach with the Pittsburgh Penguins from 1988 through 1993, winning the Stanley Cup in 1991 and 1992. He was named interim coach for the Tampa Bay Lightning in 1997. The team went 0–6–0 under Paterson. He was later named chief professional scout for the Tampa Bay Lightning before their 2002–03 season and won the Stanley Cup with the team in 2004. In 2005 he became the director of player personnel for the Mighty Ducks of Anaheim. The team was renamed the Anaheim Ducks in 2006 and with them Paterson who won the Stanley Cup with them in 2007. Since 2020 he has been director of professional scouting for the Ducks

== Career statistics ==
=== Regular season and playoffs ===
			Regular season					Playoffs
Season	Team	League	GP	G	A	Pts	PIM	GP	G	A	Pts	PIM
1973–74	Cornwall Royals	QMJHL	60	1	14	15	5	5	0	1	1	0
1974–75	Cornwall Royals	QMJHL	68	18	20	38	50	4	0	1	1	0
1975–76	Cornwall Royals	QMJHL	71	20	60	80	49	10	1	5	6	13
1976–77	Cornwall Royals	QMJHL	72	31	63	94	93	12	6	9	15	22
1977–78	Cornwall Royals	QMJHL	71	58	80	138	105	9	3	7	10	27
1978–79	Chicago Black Hawks	NHL	—	—	—	—	—	1	0	1	1	0
1978–79	New Brunswick Hawks	AHL	74	21	19	40	30	5	0	1	1	9
1979–80	Chicago Black Hawks	NHL	11	0	2	2	0	7	0	0	0	5
1979–80	New Brunswick Hawks	AHL	55	22	30	52	18	12	5	6	11	9
1980–81	Chicago Black Hawks	NHL	49	8	2	10	18	2	1	0	1	0
1980–81	New Brunswick Hawks	AHL	21	7	8	15	6	—	—	—	—	—
1981–82	Chicago Black Hawks	NHL	48	4	7	11	8	15	3	2	5	21
1981–82	New Brunswick Hawks	AHL	30	8	16	24	45	—	—	—	—	—
1982–83	Chicago Black Hawks	NHL	79	14	9	23	14	13	1	1	2	4
1983–84	Chicago Black Hawks	NHL	72	7	6	13	41	5	1	1	2	6
1984–85	Chicago Black Hawks	NHL	79	7	12	19	25	15	1	5	6	15
1985–86	Chicago Black Hawks	NHL	70	9	3	12	24	3	0	0	0	0
1986–87	Chicago Blackhawks	NHL	22	1	2	3	6	—	—	—	—	—
1986–87	Nova Scotia Oilers	AHL	31	5	7	12	2	5	0	1	1	10
1987–88	Saginaw Hawks	IHL	82	19	26	45	83	10	2	4	6	16
NHL totals			430	50	43	93	136	61	7	10	17	51

=== International ===
Year	Team	Event	GP	G	A	Pts	PIM
1978	Canada	WJC	6	1	2	3	0
Junior totals			6	1	2	3	0

Preceded by Terry Crisp	Head coach of the Tampa Bay Lightning; 1997	Succeeded by Jacques Demers
