= John Tortorella =

American ice hockey coach (born 1958)

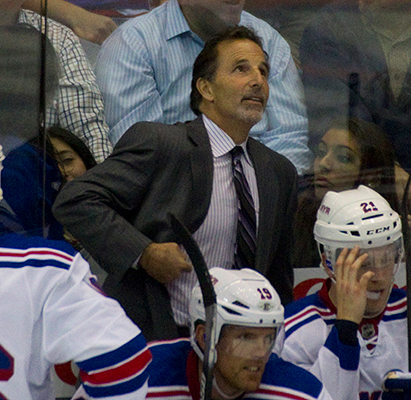
- Tortorella with the New York Rangers in 2011
- Born: June 24, 1958 (age 68) Boston, Massachusetts, U.S.
- Height: 5 ft 8 in (173 cm)
- Weight: 175 lb (79 kg; 12 st 7 lb)
- Position: Right wing
- Shot: Left
- Played for: Hampton Roads Gulls; Erie Golden Blades; Virginia Lancers
- Coached for: New York Rangers; Tampa Bay Lightning; Vancouver Canucks; Columbus Blue Jackets; Philadelphia Flyers; Vegas Golden Knights
- Playing career: 1982–1986
- Coaching career: 1988–present

John Tortorella (born June 24, 1958) is an American professional ice hockey coach and former player who most recently served as the head coach of the Vegas Golden Knights of the National Hockey League (NHL). Tortorella has also served as head coach of the NHL's New York Rangers, Tampa Bay Lightning, Vancouver Canucks, Columbus Blue Jackets and Philadelphia Flyers. With Tampa Bay, Tortorella won the Stanley Cup in 2004. Hired late into the 2025–26 season by the Golden Knights, Tortorella led the team into the 2026 Stanley Cup Final, where they lost to the Carolina Hurricanes in six games; he was not retained after the loss.

He is the first American-born NHL coach to reach 500 wins; as of the end of the 2025–26 season, he is ninth all-time in wins with 777. He has twice won the Jack Adams Award as the NHL's top coach.

Tortorella is well known for his outspoken and sometimes confrontational nature, which has included criticizing his own players and members of the media. Tortorella is also known for his system of regularly rotating goaltending duties during his time in Tampa Bay, a system which was discontinued when he became head coach of the New York Rangers and used Henrik Lundqvist as the regular starting goalie. This system returned in the 2019–20 NHL season with the Columbus Blue Jackets, with the emergence of Joonas Korpisalo and Elvis Merzļikins as the goaltender tandem.

== Playing career ==
Tortorella attended Concord-Carlisle High School in Concord, Massachusetts, and he is listed on the school's athletic Hall of Fame wall (1976). John's brother, Jim, a goaltender, is also listed on the wall.

Nicknamed "The Paper Italian", Tortorella played right wing for three years (1978–1981) at the University of Maine. While at Maine, he played with his brother Jim, who later became assistant coach for the Harvard Crimson.

After college, Tortorella went to Sweden to play a year on Kristianstads IK (1981–1982). After his season in Sweden, he came back to the United States to play four years of minor professional ice hockey (1982–1986) in the Atlantic Coast Hockey League (ACHL). During these years, he played for the Hampton Roads Gulls, Erie Golden Blades and the Virginia Lancers. Tortorella never played a game in the NHL.

== Coaching career ==
=== ECHL and AHL teams ===
Tortorella's coaching career began with the American Hockey League (AHL)'s Rochester Americans and the East Coast Hockey League (ECHL)'s Virginia Lancers. He won the Calder Cup with the 1996 Rochester Americans.

Tortorella has been credited by ECHL founders Henry Brabham and Bill Coffey for coming up with the name for the league during a meeting at a Ramada Inn in Winston-Salem, North Carolina. At the time, Tortorella was the head coach of Brabham's Virginia Lancers, but he left the Lancers to become the assistant coach of the American Hockey League (AHL)'s New Haven Nighthawks before the ECHL's inaugural season in 1988.

Tortorella got his first NHL head coaching chance when the New York Rangers fired John Muckler with four games left in the 1999-2000 season. His first game as an NHL head coach was on April 1, 2000, when the Rangers tied the Boston Bruins 2–2. Tortorella went 0–3–1.

=== Tampa Bay Lightning ===
Tortorella took over the Tampa Bay Lightning in January 2001 as a midseason head coach replacement. He inherited a team that had been among the dregs of the league for four years, having lost 50 games or more in every season during that time. The team won only 12 of its last 43 games under his watch, finishing last in the division. The following season, the team finished well out of playoff contention despite finishing third in the Southeast Division. However, they showed signs of life for the first time in five years, cracking the 60-point barrier for the first time since 1996–97.

The 2002–03 season marked Tortorella's first winning season as an NHL head coach, as the Lightning won their first Southeast Division title, losing to the New Jersey Devils four games to one in the second round of the 2003 playoffs. At the end of the season he was also recognized as a finalist for the Jack Adams Award as coach of the year, losing out to Minnesota's Jacques Lemaire.

In 2003–04, Tortorella's fourth season with the team, the Lightning ran away with the Southeast Division title, tallying 106 points—the second-best record in the league. The Lightning were the top seed in the Eastern Conference and proceeded to defeat the New York Islanders, the Montreal Canadiens, and the Philadelphia Flyers to win the Prince of Wales Trophy. In the 2004 Stanley Cup Final, they defeated the Western Conference champion Calgary Flames four games to three, winning the first Stanley Cup in franchise history. In doing so Tortorella became just the third American-born coach to win it and the first in 13 years. The team was in its eleventh year of existence. It was the last Stanley Cup won before the 2004–05 NHL lockout. A few days after winning the Stanley Cup, Tortorella won the 2004 Jack Adams Award as coach of the year.

Before the start of the 2005–06 season – the NHL's first post-lockout campaign – Tampa Bay's starting goaltender Nikolai Khabibulin left the team due to the newly implemented salary cap restrictions. Tortorella was hard on Lightning goaltender John Grahame for much of the 2005–06.

Grahame subsequently signed with the Carolina Hurricanes before the start of the 2006–07 season. Despite the Lightning winning 44 games in 2006–07, the team was unable to defend their division title.

On March 11, 2008, with the Lightning's 8–4 win over the New York Islanders, Tortorella passed Bob Johnson as the most successful American-born NHL coach with 235 victories.

After getting fired by the Lightning in the 2008 off-season, Tortorella was an in-studio panelist on the NHL on TSN. During this time, on November 7, 2008, Peter Laviolette would overtake his victory total for an American coach.

=== New York Rangers ===
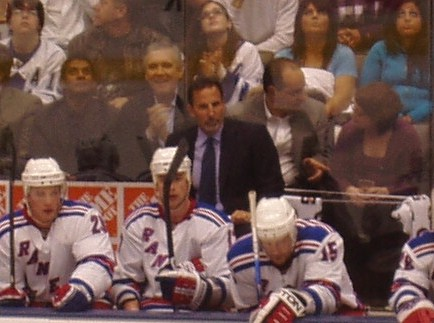
Tortorella as head coach of the New York Rangers during a game in March 2009. He was named the Rangers' head coach on February 23, 2009.

Tortorella was named head coach of the New York Rangers on February 23, 2009, replacing Tom Renney, who was relieved of his duties earlier that day. On March 17, he again became the American-born coach with the most wins in NHL history, this time surpassing Laviolette. Tortorella was suspended one game by the NHL for an altercation with several Capitals fans behind the bench in the third period of game five in the 2009 Stanley Cup playoffs. Replays show a fan clearly heckling Tortorella, before Tortorella responded by throwing a water bottle at a fan and then grabbing a stick from Aaron Voros and trying to spear the fan through a space between two panes of glass. He did not receive a penalty at the time despite the fact that NHL rules state any physical altercation with fans results in ejection from the game. However, the next day the NHL suspended him.

When Laviolette became coach of the Philadelphia Flyers in 2009, the rivalry between the two teams became further heated with Tortorella and Laviolette being the winningest U.S.-born coaches in NHL history. On November 20, 2010, Tortorella became the first American-born coach to reach 300 NHL victories when the Rangers defeated the Minnesota Wild.

In the 2011–12 season he guided the Rangers to the franchise's third ever 50-win season and the best record in the Eastern Conference with a total of 51–24–7 for 109 points. New York lost in the conference finals to the New Jersey Devils in six games. At season's end, Tortorella became a finalist for the Jack Adams Award for a third time, losing to Ken Hitchcock of the St. Louis Blues.

On March 26, 2013, with a 5–2 defeat of Laviolette's Flyers, Tortorella became the 30th NHL coach to reach 400 career victories.

The Rangers fired Tortorella on May 29, 2013, four days after New York was eliminated from the second round of the Stanley Cup playoffs by the Boston Bruins.

=== Vancouver Canucks ===
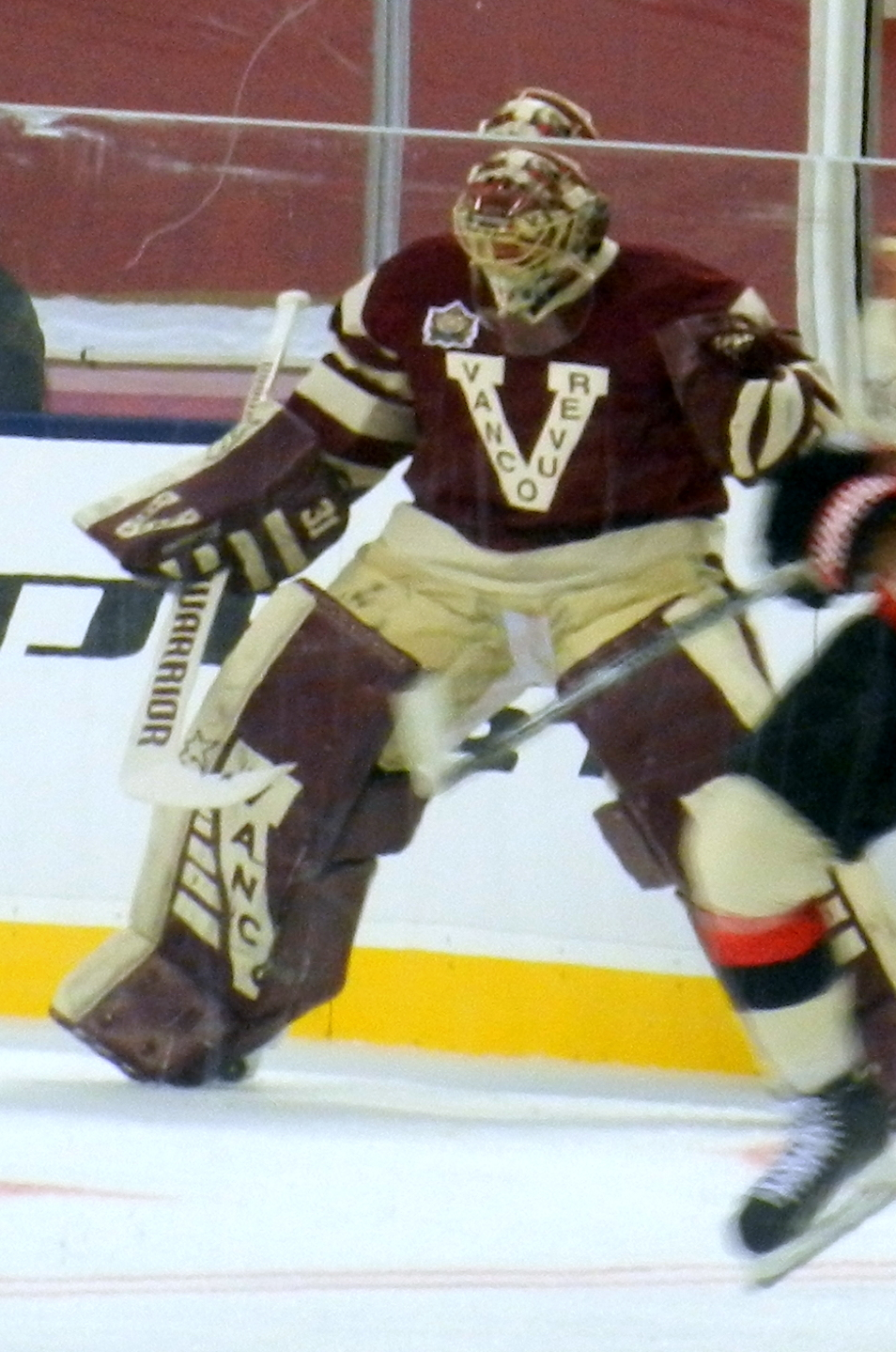
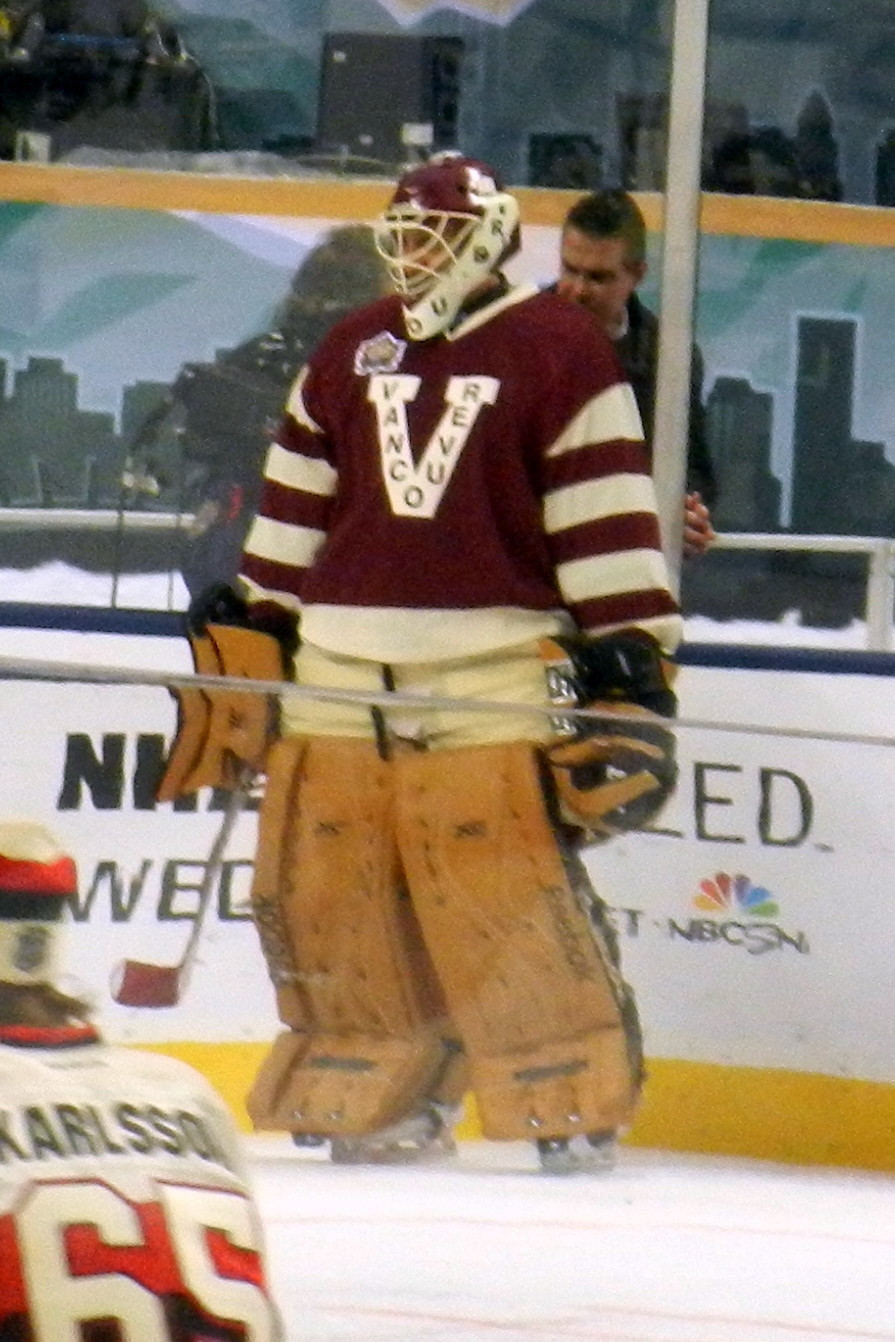
As the Vancouver Canucks head coach, Tortorella sparked controversy starting Eddie Läck (left) over Roberto Luongo (right) in the 2014 Heritage Classic.

The Vancouver Canucks announced Tortorella as the team's new coach on June 25, 2013. He replaced Alain Vigneault, who coincidentally had been hired by the Rangers to replace Tortorella.

Tortorella earned his first victory with the Canucks against the Edmonton Oilers on October 5, 2013, with a final score of 6–2.

During the first intermission of a game on January 18, 2014, Tortorella entered the Calgary Flames dressing room area in an apparent attempt to confront Flames coach Bob Hartley; after a line brawl in the opening seconds of the 1st period, Tortorella angrily attempted to confront Hartley, accusing him of starting a lineup with intent to injure a star Canuck player. Tortorella had to be physically restrained by several players and coaches. The NHL subsequently suspended him for 15 days without pay, barring him from being in contact with the team during his suspension. Canucks assistant coach Mike Sullivan took over the head coaching job during Tortorella's suspension.

On March 2, 2014, Tortorella sparked controversy when he chose to start Eddie Läck in the 2014 Heritage Classic held in Vancouver over Roberto Luongo. Luongo was openly disappointed and got traded two days later.

He lived full-time in Point Roberts, Washington instead of Vancouver. Tortorella was criticized by his players for the inadequate number of practice days, for which he would drive in for a brief appearance, then leave his assistants to handle everything else before returning home. This arrangement frustrated general manager Mike Gillis who had a bed built into Tortorella's office so he could take naps there instead of driving home.

Tortorella's tenure with the Canucks would last only a single season, as the team missed the playoffs for the first time since 2008. On May 1, 2014, Tortorella and assistant coach Mike Sullivan were fired as part of a management overhaul that had also seen General Manager Mike Gillis let go several weeks prior.

=== Columbus Blue Jackets ===
On October 21, 2015, Tortorella was hired to replace Todd Richards as the Columbus Blue Jackets' head coach, after the Blue Jackets started the 2015–16 season with a 0–7–0 record. As compensation for the Blue Jackets hiring Tortorella, the Canucks received the 55th overall pick (used to select Jonah Gadjovich) in the 2017 NHL entry draft from the Blue Jackets. On March 19, 2016, when the Blue Jackets faced the New Jersey Devils, Tortorella became the 26th head coach in NHL history, and the first born in the United States, to coach 1,000 games.

On December 18, 2016, the Blue Jackets defeated the Canucks in overtime 4–3, making Tortorella the first American-born coach with 500 victories. His success in the 2016–17 season resulted in his second Jack Adams Award.

On January 10, 2019, Tortorella became the first American-born coach, and 19th overall, to reach 600 victories when the Blue Jackets defeated the Nashville Predators. In the 2019 Stanley Cup playoffs, Tortorella's Blue Jackets won their first playoff series in franchise history by eliminating his old team, the Tampa Bay Lightning. It was also the first time that the Presidents' Trophy-winning team failed to win any playoff games despite the Lightning matching the record of 62 regular season wins.

On January 2, 2020, Tortorella was fined $20,000 by the NHL for negative comments he made about the on-ice officials on December 29, 2019, after they mishandled the clock in overtime, causing the Blue Jackets to lose 3–2 against the Chicago Blackhawks. The NHL required Tortorella to refrain from similar behavior for the remainder of the year or be fined $25,000; however, on August 25, 2020, Tortorella was fined an additional $25,000 for his actions during virtual media availability following the Blue Jackets' elimination from the playoff bubble by the eventual champion Tampa Bay Lightning. In spite of the controversy, he was named a Jack Adams finalist for the second time as Blue Jackets coach and fifth overall.

On May 9, 2021, Tortorella and the Blue Jackets mutually agreed part ways after the expiration of his contract. Tortorella finished his tenure with the Blue Jackets with the most wins of any head coach in franchise history.

=== Philadelphia Flyers ===
After spending the 2021–22 season as a studio analyst on ESPN, Tortorella was named the head coach of the Philadelphia Flyers on June 17, 2022. On December 29, 2023, Tortorella coached his 1,500th NHL regular season game, becoming the eighth head coach in NHL history, and the first American-born coach, to reach the mark.

On March 9, 2024, Tortorella was ejected from a game against the Tampa Bay Lightning following a verbal dispute with referees Wes McCauley and Brandon Schrader. Despite this, Tortorella stalled and stayed on the Flyers bench for several minutes, continuing his altercation with McCauley and Schrader before eventually leaving. The following day, Tortorella was suspended for two games and was fined $50,000.

Tortorella was dismissed as Flyers' head coach on March 27, 2025, and was replaced by Brad Shaw who had previously served as the associate coach.

=== United States men's national team ===
Tortorella was the assistant coach of the United States national team in 2008 and 2009, replacing Peter Laviolette, which included leading the squad at the 2008 World Championship, where they finished sixth.

Tortorella was tapped to coach the United States at the 2016 World Cup of Hockey. In the lead-up to the tournament, he said he would "sit" any player who protests during the playing of the national anthem. The team ultimately failed to make it out of the group stage, losing all three games.

Tortorella served as Mike Sullivan's assistant during the 2026 Winter Olympics, where the United States won gold medals after defeating Canada 2–1 in overtime.

=== Vegas Golden Knights ===
Late in the 2025–26 season, Tortorella was named head coach of the Vegas Golden Knights on March 29, 2026, after the firing of Bruce Cassidy. Tortorella was signed on a contract through the end of the season, including the 2026 Stanley Cup playoffs, with his long-term future to be determined after the season. In his debut, the Golden Knights recorded a 4–2 victory over the Vancouver Canucks, one of Tortorella's former teams. He led the team to a 7–0–1 record in those final eight games of the regular season, clinching the Pacific Division title in the last game, a 4–1 win over the visiting Seattle Kraken on April 15.

After defeating the Utah Mammoth in the first round of the 2026 playoffs and the Anaheim Ducks in the second round, both in six games, underdog Vegas advanced to the Stanley Cup Final by sweeping the Presidents' Trophy winner Colorado Avalanche in four games. With the sweep over Colorado, combined with his previous sweep with Columbus over Tampa Bay in 2019, Tortorella became the first hockey head coach to lead multiple teams to a sweep over a team that had won the Presidents' Trophy. The Golden Knights subsequently lost the Stanley Cup Final to the Carolina Hurricanes in six games. On June 16, two days after the Cup Final's conclusion, the Golden Knights announced that Tortorella would not return as head coach.

== Head coaching record ==
| Team | Year | Regular Season | | | | | | | Postseason |
| Team | Year | G | W | L | T | OTL | Pts | Finish | Result |
|---|---|---|---|---|---|---|---|---|---|
| NYR | 1999–2000* | 4 | 0 | 3 | 1 | 0 | (1) | 4th in Atlantic | Missed playoffs |
| TBL | 2000–01* | 43 | 12 | 27 | 1 | 3 | (28) | 5th in Southeast | Missed playoffs |
| TBL | 2001–02 | 82 | 27 | 40 | 11 | 4 | 69 | 3rd in Southeast | Missed playoffs |
| TBL | 2002–03 | 82 | 36 | 25 | 16 | 5 | 93 | 1st in Southeast | Lost in conference semifinals (NJD) |
| TBL | 2003–04 | 82 | 46 | 22 | 8 | 6 | 106 | 1st in Southeast | Won Stanley Cup (CGY) |
| TBL | 2005–06 | 82 | 43 | 33 | — | 6 | 92 | 2nd in Southeast | Lost in conference quarterfinals (OTT) |
| TBL | 2006–07 | 82 | 44 | 33 | — | 5 | 93 | 2nd in Southeast | Lost in conference quarterfinals (NJD) |
| TBL | 2007–08 | 82 | 31 | 42 | — | 9 | 71 | 5th in Southeast | Missed playoffs |
| TBL total | | 535 | 239 | 222 | 36 | 38 | | | 4 playoff appearances 1 Stanley Cup |
| NYR | 2008–09* | 21 | 12 | 7 | — | 2 | (26) | 4th in Atlantic | Lost in conference quarterfinals (WSH) |
| NYR | 2009–10 | 82 | 38 | 33 | — | 11 | 87 | 4th in Atlantic | Missed playoffs |
| NYR | 2010–11 | 82 | 44 | 33 | — | 5 | 93 | 3rd in Atlantic | Lost in conference quarterfinals (WSH) |
| NYR | 2011–12 | 82 | 51 | 24 | — | 7 | 109 | 1st in Atlantic | Lost in conference finals (NJD) |
| NYR | 2012–13 | 48 | 26 | 18 | — | 4 | 56 | 2nd in Atlantic | Lost in conference semifinals (BOS) |
| NYR total | | 319 | 171 | 118 | 1 | 29 | | | 4 playoff appearances |
| VAN | 2013–14 | 82 | 36 | 35 | — | 11 | 83 | 5th in Pacific | Missed playoffs |
| VAN total | | 82 | 36 | 35 | — | 11 | | | |
| CBJ | 2015–16* | 75 | 34 | 33 | — | 8 | (76) | 8th in Metropolitan | Missed playoffs |
| CBJ | 2016–17 | 82 | 50 | 24 | — | 8 | 108 | 3rd in Metropolitan | Lost in first round (PIT) |
| CBJ | 2017–18 | 82 | 45 | 30 | — | 7 | 97 | 4th in Metropolitan | Lost in first round (WSH) |
| CBJ | 2018–19 | 82 | 47 | 31 | — | 4 | 98 | 5th in Metropolitan | Lost in second round (BOS) |
| CBJ | 2019–20 | 70 | 33 | 22 | — | 15 | 81 | 5th in Metropolitan | Lost in first round (TBL) |
| CBJ | 2020–21 | 56 | 18 | 26 | — | 12 | 48 | 8th in Central | Missed playoffs |
| CBJ total | | 447 | 227 | 166 | — | 54 | | | 4 playoff appearances |
| PHI | 2022–23 | 82 | 31 | 38 | — | 13 | 75 | 7th in Metropolitan | Missed playoffs |
| PHI | 2023–24 | 82 | 38 | 33 | — | 11 | 87 | 6th in Metropolitan | Missed playoffs |
| PHI | 2024–25 | 73 | 28 | 36 | — | 9 | (65) | (fired) | — |
| PHI total | | 237 | 97 | 107 | — | 33 | | | |
| VGK | 2025–26* | 8 | 7 | 0 | — | 1 | (15) | 1st in Pacific | Lost in Stanley Cup Final (CAR) |
| VGK total | | 8 | 7 | 0 | — | 1 | | | 1 playoff appearance |
| Total | | 1,628 | 777 | 648 | 37 | 166 | | | 13 playoff appearances 1 Stanley Cup |

* – Mid-season replacement

Awards and achievements
| Preceded by Jacques Lemaire; Barry Trotz | Jack Adams Award; 2004; 2017 | Succeeded by Lindy Ruff; Gerard Gallant |
Sporting positions
| Preceded by Steve Ludzik | Head coach of the Tampa Bay Lightning; 2001–2008 | Succeeded by Barry Melrose |
| Preceded by Tom Renney | Head coach of the New York Rangers; 2009–2013 | Succeeded by Alain Vigneault |
| Preceded by Alain Vigneault | Head coach of the Vancouver Canucks; 2013–2014 | Succeeded by Willie Desjardins |
| Preceded by Todd Richards | Head coach of the Columbus Blue Jackets; 2015–2021 | Succeeded by Brad Larsen |
| Preceded by Mike Yeo (interim) | Head coach of the Philadelphia Flyers; 2022–2025 | Succeeded by Brad Shaw (interim) |
| Preceded by Bruce Cassidy | Head coach of the Vegas Golden Knights; 2026 | Succeeded by Ryan Craig |
