= List of Tampa Bay Lightning general managers =

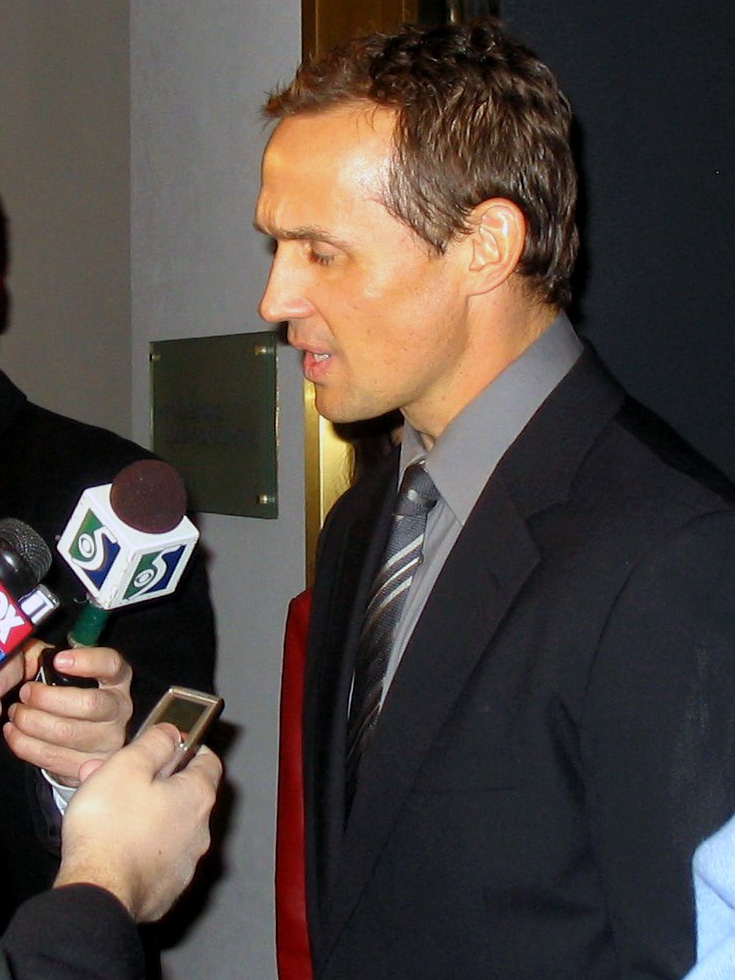
Steve Yzerman was the general manager of the Tampa Bay Lightning from 2010 to 2018.

The Tampa Bay Lightning are an American professional ice hockey team based in Tampa, Florida. They play in the Atlantic Division of the Eastern Conference in the National Hockey League (NHL). Often referred to as the Bolts, the team joined the NHL in 1992 as an expansion team, and have won the Stanley Cup championship in 2004, 2020 and 2021. Having first played in the Expo Hall, and later in the ThunderDome (now known as Tropicana Field), the Lightning have played their home games at the Ice Palace, currently titled Benchmark International Arena, since 1996. The franchise has had seven general managers since their inception.

== Key ==
Key of terms and definitions
Term	Definition
No.	Number of general managers^{[a]}
Ref(s)	References
–	Does not apply

== General managers ==
General managers of the Tampa Bay Lightning
No.	Name	Tenure	Accomplishments during this term	Ref(s)
1	Phil Esposito	April 4, 1991 – October 13, 1998	1 playoff appearance	
2	Jacques Demers	October 13, 1998 – July 14, 1999	No playoff appearances	
3	Rick Dudley	July 14, 1999 – February 10, 2002	No playoff appearances	
4	Jay Feaster	February 10, 2002 – July 11, 2008	Won Stanley Cup (2004); 1 conference title, 2 division titles, and 4 playoff appearances	
5	Brian Lawton	October 22, 2008 – April 12, 2010	No playoff appearances	
–	Tom Kurvers (Interim)	April 12, 2010 – May 25, 2010		
6	Steve Yzerman	May 25, 2010 – September 11, 2018	1 Stanley Cup Finals appearance (2015); Won General Manager of the Year Award (2014–15); 1 conference title, 1 division title, and 5 playoff appearances	
7	Julien BriseBois	September 11, 2018 – present	Won Stanley Cup (2020, 2021); Won Presidents' Trophy (2018–19); 2 conference titles, 1 Stanley Cup Semifinals^{[b]}, 1 division title and 8 playoff appearances	

== See also ==
- List of NHL general managers

== Notes ==
- ^{a} A running total of the number of general managers of the franchise. Thus any general manager who has two or more separate terms as general manager is only counted once. Interim general managers do not count towards the total.
- ^{b} Due to the temporary realignment and interdivision play there was no conference final in the 2021 Stanley Cup playoffs. The league referred to it as the Stanley Cup Semifinals. The Prince of Wales Trophy was still awarded as it is in a traditional season.
