= Steve Yzerman =

Canadian ice hockey player (born 1965)

- Hockey Hall of Fame, 2009
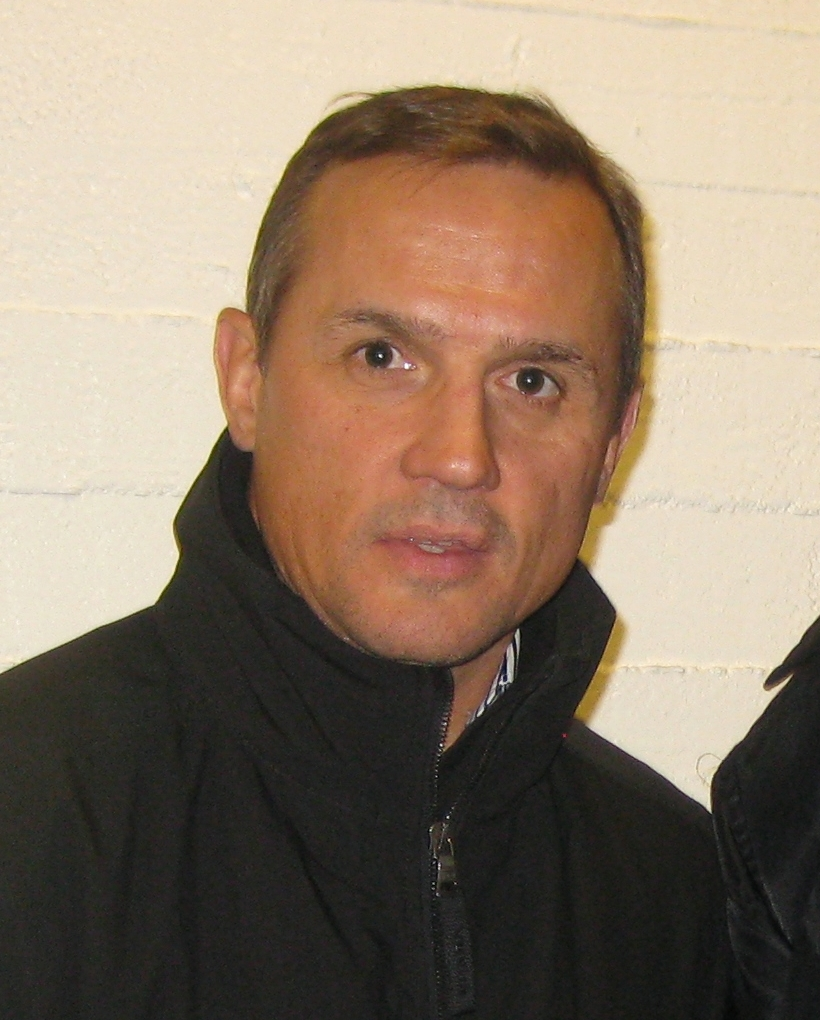
- Yzerman in 2012
- Born: May 9, 1965 (age 61) Cranbrook, British Columbia, Canada
- Height: 5 ft 11 in (180 cm)
- Weight: 185 lb (84 kg; 13 st 3 lb)
- Position: Centre
- Shot: Right
- Played for: Detroit Red Wings
- National team: Canada
- NHL draft: 4th overall, 1983; Detroit Red Wings
- Playing career: 1983–2006
Medal record
Representing Canada
Men's ice hockey
Olympic Games
Gold medal – first place	2002 Salt Lake City
World Cup
Silver medal – second place	1996 Canada
World Championships
Silver medal – second place	1985 Czechoslovakia
Silver medal – second place	1989 Sweden
Canada Cup
Gold medal – first place	1984 Canada
World Junior Championships
Bronze medal – third place	1983 Soviet Union

Stephen Gregory Yzerman (/ˈaɪzərmən/ EYE-zər-mən; born May 9, 1965) is a Canadian former professional hockey player who is currently a senior advisor for the Detroit Red Wings. A Detroit sports icon and a member of the Hockey Hall of Fame, Yzerman played his entire 22-season career with the Red Wings. After his retirement as a player, he served in the front office of the Red Wings, and then as general manager of the Tampa Bay Lightning, while also being executive director for Team Canada in two Olympics.

Prior to the 1986–87 season, at age 21, Yzerman was named captain of the Red Wings and continuously served for the next two decades (dressing as captain for over 1,300 games), retiring as the longest-serving captain of any team in North American major league sports history. Locals often simply refer to Yzerman as "Stevie Y", "Stevie Wonder", or "The Captain". Yzerman led the Wings to five first-place regular season finishes and three Stanley Cup championships (1997, 1998, and 2002). He retired in 2006 among the NHL leaders in total career points and went on to a further career in NHL and international management.

Yzerman won numerous awards during his career, including the Lester B. Pearson Award (most outstanding player) in the 1988–89 season, the Conn Smythe Trophy (most valuable player of the Stanley Cup playoffs) in 1998, the Selke Trophy as the league's best defensive forward in 2000 and the Bill Masterton Memorial Trophy for perseverance in 2003. He played in ten All-Star Games and was a first team All-Star in 2000 and a member of the All-Rookie Team in 1984.

Yzerman has represented his country in several international tournaments as a member of Canada's national hockey team (Team Canada). In 2002, Yzerman won an Olympic gold medal, making him one of few players to win an Olympic gold medal and the Stanley Cup in the same year. Yzerman was the general manager of Team Canada for the 2007 IIHF World Championship, which they won. Yzerman was appointed executive director of Team Canada on October 7, 2008, for the 2010 Winter Olympics. Team Canada went on to win the gold medal by defeating the United States. Yzerman was again appointed executive director of Team Canada on March 5, 2012, for the 2014 Winter Olympics. Canada went on to win their second-straight gold medal after defeating Sweden. He was inducted into the IIHF Hall of Fame in 2014.

== Playing career ==
=== Early years in Detroit (1983–1986) ===
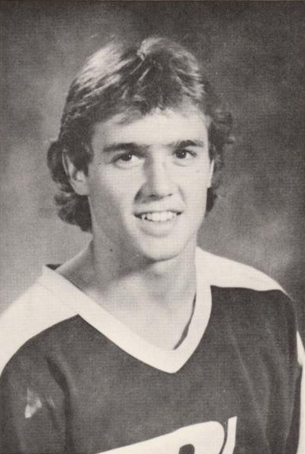
Yzerman with the Peterborough Petes in 1982

Yzerman was born in Cranbrook, British Columbia. As a youth, he played in the 1977 Quebec International Pee-Wee Hockey Tournament with a minor ice hockey team from Nepean, Ontario. He attended Bell High School and played for his hometown Nepean Raiders Junior A hockey team. After one season with the Raiders, the Peterborough Petes of the Ontario Hockey League (OHL) drafted him, and he played centre for the Petes from 1981 to 1983.

The 1983 NHL entry draft was the first for Mike and Marian Ilitch, who had purchased the Detroit Red Wings in the summer of 1982. Jim Devellano, the Red Wings' general manager at the time, wanted to draft Pat LaFontaine, who had grown up outside Detroit and played his junior hockey in the area. However, when the New York Islanders selected LaFontaine third overall, Devellano "settled" on Yzerman, drafting him fourth.

The Red Wings were prepared to send Yzerman back to Peterborough for one more year, but "after one (training camp) session, you knew he was a tremendous hockey player", said Ken Holland, the former Red Wings general manager who was then a minor league goaltender for the Wings during Yzerman's rookie training camp. Yzerman tallied 39 goals and 87 points in his rookie season and finished second in Calder Memorial Trophy voting. That season, Yzerman also became the first 18-year-old and youngest player to play in an NHL All-Star Game (18 years, 267 days) since the current format was adopted in 1969. This stood as an NHL record for 27 years until Jeff Skinner broke it by eight days.

=== Rise to stardom (1986–1996) ===
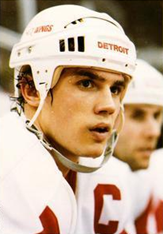
Yzerman as captain of the Detroit Red Wings in 1987

Following the departure of Red Wings captain Danny Gare during the 1985–86 season, Red Wings head coach Jacques Demers named Yzerman captain of the team on October 7, 1986, making him the youngest captain in the team's history. Demers said he "wanted a guy with the Red Wings crest tattooed on his chest". During the next season, Yzerman scored his then-career high 50th goal against the Buffalo Sabres on March 1, 1988. However, during the same game, Yzerman suffered a knee injury which caused him to miss the rest of the regular season. Despite his absence, the Red Wings would win their first division title in 23 years.

During the 1988–89 season, Yzerman recorded 155 points (65 goals and 90 assists), finishing third in regular season scoring behind Mario Lemieux and Wayne Gretzky. He won the Lester B. Pearson Award, the MVP as voted by the National Hockey League Players' Association, and was a finalist for the Hart Memorial Trophy, the MVP as voted by the NHL writers.

When Scotty Bowman took over as head coach in 1993, Yzerman initially chafed under Bowman's stern coaching style. Bowman, for his part, felt that Yzerman was not concentrating enough on defence; Bowman had long expected his forwards to be good back-checkers as well. Relations between the two became so strained that at one point, the Red Wings seriously considered trading him to the Ottawa Senators. However, Yzerman gradually became a better defender and was considered one of the best two-way forwards in the history of the game.

In 1995, Yzerman led Detroit to its first appearance in the Stanley Cup Final since 1966, but the Red Wings were swept by the New Jersey Devils. The next season saw Detroit finish with a then NHL-record 62 regular season wins and were heavily favoured to win the Stanley Cup. Yzerman scored perhaps the most memorable goal of his career in the 1996 playoffs, stealing the puck from Wayne Gretzky and beating St. Louis Blues goaltender Jon Casey with a slap shot from the blue line to win the Western Conference Semifinals in double overtime of game seven. However, the Red Wings fell short of their ultimate goal, losing in six games to the Colorado Avalanche in the Western Conference Finals.

=== Stanley Cup titles (1996–2002) ===
In 1997, Yzerman put to rest all doubts of his ability to lead a team to a championship as Detroit won its first Stanley Cup in 42 years after sweeping the Philadelphia Flyers. The following year, Detroit repeated the feat, sweeping the Washington Capitals and winning their second consecutive Cup title. Yzerman earned the Conn Smythe Trophy as playoff MVP. He handed the Cup first to Vladimir Konstantinov, who had been severely injured in a car accident just six days after the Cup victory in 1997 and was using a wheelchair.

On November 26, 1999, Yzerman became the 11th player in NHL history to score 600 goals. In 2000, he made the NHL All-Star first team and won the Frank J. Selke Trophy as the league's top defensive forward.

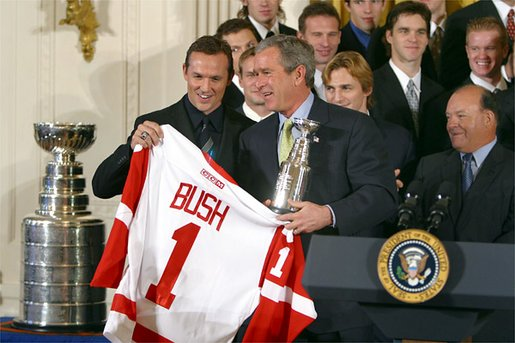
With the Stanley Cup present (l), U.S. President George W. Bush receives a commemorative jersey and mini-Cup from 2002 Stanley Cup Champion Steve Yzerman.

In 2001–02, Yzerman re-aggravated a knee injury, forcing him to miss 30 regular season games, though nonetheless still finished sixth in team scoring. Yzerman's knee greatly pained him during the 2002 playoffs, but this did not stop him from leading the Red Wings from an early 2–0 deficit in their opening round series to defeat the Vancouver Canucks and St. Louis Blues en route to Detroit's fifth playoff series with Colorado, and the third time the two teams had battled to decide the Western Conference Championship. Detroit defeated Colorado in a seven-game series and moved on to the Stanley Cup Final, where they defeated the Carolina Hurricanes to win their tenth Stanley Cup championship in their history. Rather than raising the Stanley Cup first, Yzerman passed the Cup to head coach Scotty Bowman, who announced his retirement following the game.

=== Final years (2003–2006) ===
During the offseason, Yzerman underwent a knee realignment surgery known as an osteotomy. He missed the first 61 games of the 2002–03 season, but returned on February 24, 2003, at home against the Los Angeles Kings. After the season, Yzerman won the Bill Masterton Memorial Trophy for perseverance.

On May 1, 2004, Yzerman was hit in the eye by a deflected slapshot by the Calgary Flames defenceman Rhett Warrener in a playoff game, breaking his orbital bone and scratching his cornea. Yzerman underwent eye surgery following the incident, and was sidelined for the remainder of the 2004 playoffs. The eye injury also forced Yzerman to miss the 2004 World Cup of Hockey. Joe Thornton (then of the Boston Bruins) and Joe Sakic (Colorado), who each wore the number 19 for their respective NHL clubs and who were now eligible to wear it for team Canada due to Yzerman's enforced absence, both refused the number out of respect for their injured countryman. Yzerman returned in the 2005–06 season, following the 2004–05 NHL lockout, wearing a visor.

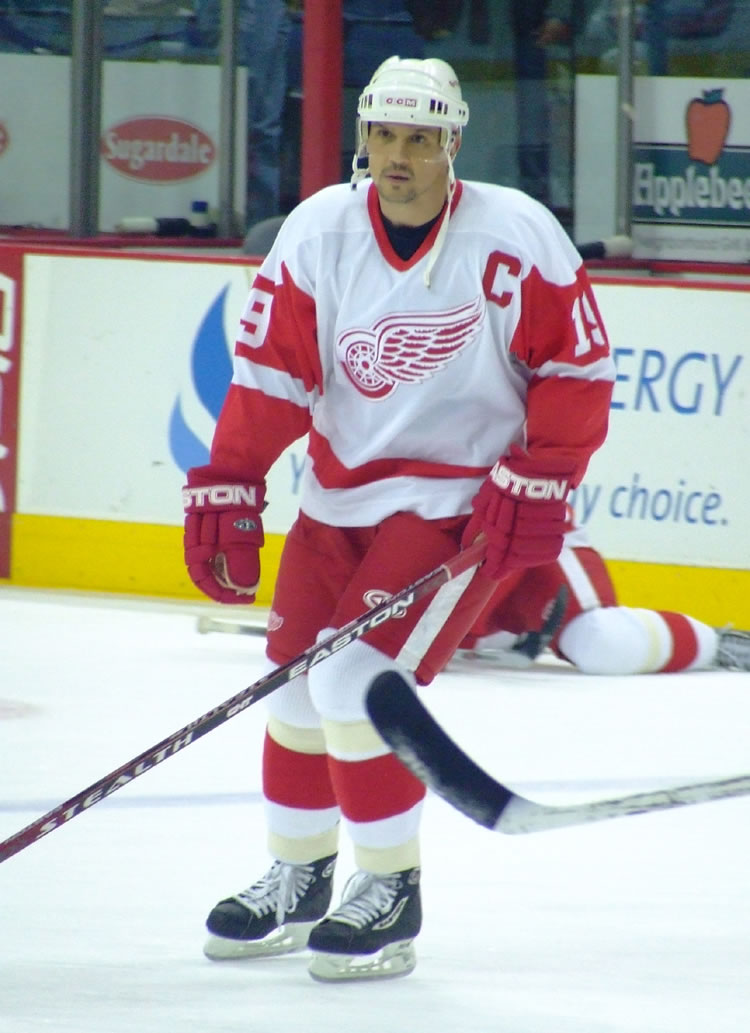
Yzerman with the Red Wings during his final NHL season.

On August 2, 2005, Yzerman signed a one-year deal with the Red Wings; this was his last contract signed as a player. On March 31, 2006, he scored his 691st NHL career goal, passing Mario Lemieux for eighth place all-time. Yzerman's humility was evident in an interview prior to his achievement when he was quoted saying, "I don't really know the significance. If anything, it shows how good [Lemieux] is; he played almost five years less than I did." He scored his final NHL goal, the 692nd of his career, on April 3, 2006, in a game against the Calgary Flames. Yzerman played his last professional hockey game on May 1, 2006, a loss to the Edmonton Oilers in game six of the first round of the 2006 playoffs which knocked Detroit out of the playoffs.

=== Retirement ===
On July 3, 2006, Yzerman announced his retirement from the NHL. Shortly afterwards, Sports Illustrated published a special commemorative edition dedicated to Yzerman entitled "Yzerman: A Salute to Stevie Y." He finished his career ranked as the sixth all-time leading scorer in NHL history, having scored a career-high 155 points (65 goals and 90 assists) in 1988–89, which has been bettered only by Wayne Gretzky and Mario Lemieux. Yzerman's #19 jersey was retired on January 2, 2007, during a pre-game ceremony at Joe Louis Arena in Detroit. On November 4, 2008, he was inducted into Canada's Sports Hall of Fame. He also became an honoured member of the Hockey Hall of Fame in 2009, his first year of eligibility, inducted alongside 2001–02 Red Wing teammates Brett Hull and Luc Robitaille. In 2017, Yzerman was named one of the "100 Greatest NHL Players" in history.

Yzerman held the NHL record as the longest-tenured captain of a single team, as he spent 19 seasons and 1,303 games wearing the "C". Sidney Crosby surpassed him as the longest-tenured captain during the 2026–27 NHL season. In addition to being eighth all-time in NHL regular-season goals and sixth in overall scoring, Yzerman finished his career seventh all-time in regular season assists and eighth in all-time playoff scoring. He also ranks second in nearly every significant offensive category in Red Wings history behind Gordie Howe, except for assists – Yzerman has 1,063 assists to Howe's 1,020. At the time of his retirement, only Howe (1,687 games) and Alex Delvecchio (1,550 games) had played more games as a Red Wing than Yzerman's 1,514. He is now fourth in games played for the franchise, behind Howe, Delvecchio, and Nicklas Lidström (1,564 games), who was his teammate for the final 12 seasons of his career.

== Managerial career ==
=== Detroit Red Wings ===
On September 25, 2006, the Red Wings named Yzerman team vice-president and alternate governor.

On January 2, 2007, Yzerman was presented the key to the city of Detroit by Mayor Kwame Kilpatrick. It was also announced that an intersection would be named after him. Later that night, the Red Wings retired Yzerman's jersey #19 before a game against the Anaheim Ducks. As an additional honour, the captain's "C" was added to the corner of his banner to forever commemorate him as "The Captain". The official retirement ceremony was hosted by Yzerman's long-time friend, former NHL goaltender and ESPN hockey analyst Darren Pang, and featured such Red Wing luminaries as Gordie Howe, Ted Lindsay, Alex Delvecchio and Scotty Bowman. For the ceremony, active Red Wings players wore Yzerman throwback jerseys representing the Red Wings, Team Canada (Canada won gold at the 2002 Salt Lake City Winter Olympic Games), the Campbell Conference All-Star team and the Peterborough Petes. Former teammate Vladimir Konstantinov attended the ceremony, walking across the ice for the first time without a wheelchair since his last game in the 1997 playoffs.

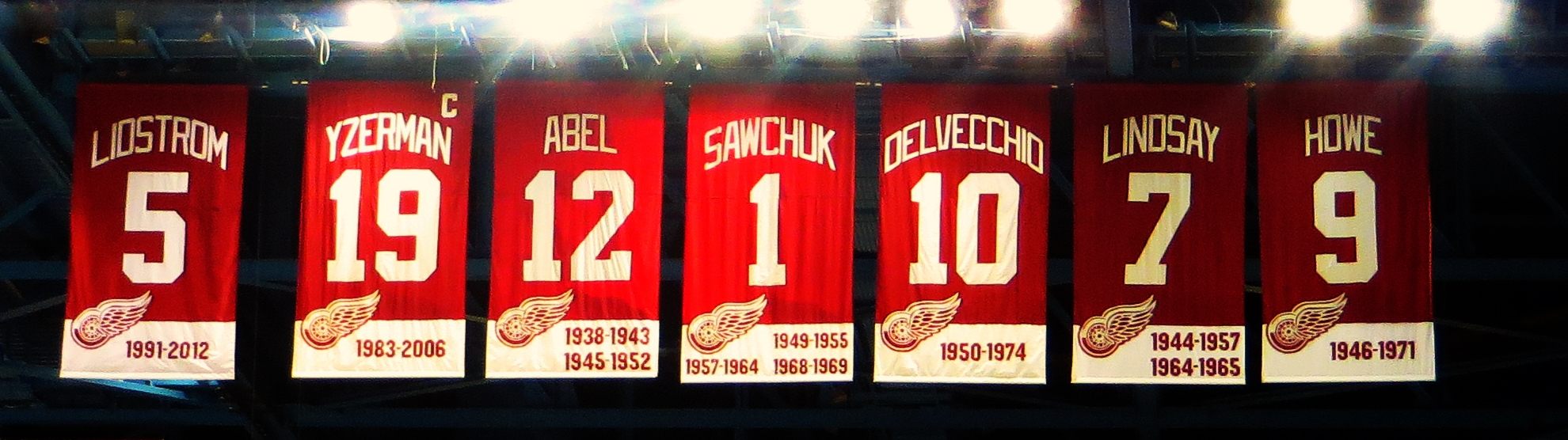
Banner for Yzerman's number 19 hanging alongside other banners of retired Red Wings numbers at Joe Louis Arena. The Red Wings retired Yzerman's number in 2007.

On January 13, Governor of Michigan Jennifer Granholm, another Canadian–American, visited Detroit and the Joe Louis Arena and proclaimed the day as "Steve Yzerman Day" in Michigan.

On January 11, 2008, when the Red Wings visited Ottawa to play the Senators, Yzerman was inducted into the Ottawa Sports Hall of Fame. Yzerman received another honour when he was inducted into the Michigan Sports Hall of Fame on February 11. He won a fourth Stanley Cup championship as an executive in 2007–08.

On June 23, 2009, it was announced that Yzerman would be inducted into the Hockey Hall of Fame. He was honoured during the November 6–9 induction weekend alongside his former Red Wings teammates Brett Hull and Luc Robitaille, as well as Brian Leetch.

Yzerman had expressed his desire to run a team while with the Red Wings front office since the latter part of his playing career, and had gained experience in running a team through his work with Hockey Canada, having assembled several rosters between 2007 and 2010 for Hockey Canada. However, after both general manager Ken Holland and assistant general manager Jim Nill received contract extensions, it became clear that the opportunity would not happen with the Red Wings. It was later reported by The Detroit News in 2016 that Red Wings owner Mike Ilitch attempted to promote Holland to make room for Yzerman to become the team's general manager, but Holland declined the promotion.

=== Tampa Bay Lightning ===
Not long after Ken Holland received his contract extension, Craig Leipold, owner of the Minnesota Wild, and Jeffrey Vinik, the then-new owner of the Tampa Bay Lightning, sought to hire Yzerman as general manager. After turning down the Minnesota job before the 2009–10 season concluded, Yzerman accepted the Lightning job and was named the team's new vice-president and general manager on May 25, 2010. In the off-season, and early in his new reign, he re-signed Martin St. Louis, signed defenceman Pavel Kubina for his second tenure with the team, signed free agent goaltender Dan Ellis to a two-year contract, signed defenceman Brett Clark and brought in left-winger Simon Gagné in a trade that saw Matt Walker and a fourth-round pick in 2011 depart Tampa Bay. In the middle of the season, he also traded for goaltender Dwayne Roloson as the Lightning progressed to the Eastern Conference Finals just one year after the team had not even qualified for the 2010 playoffs. For his part, Yzerman was nominated for the NHL General Manager of the Year Award, losing out to Vancouver's Mike Gillis.

While the Lightning would miss the playoffs in each of the next two seasons, Yzerman would draft Nikita Kucherov, Andrei Vasilevskiy, Brayden Point, Ondřej Palát, Anthony Cirelli, and Cal Foote, signed undrafted players Tyler Johnson and Yanni Gourde, and acquire Ryan McDonagh, Mikhail Sergachev, and Erik Černák via trade as future cornerstone roster pieces. The team would reach the Stanley Cup Final in 2015, where they were defeated by the Chicago Blackhawks. On June 24, 2015, Yzerman won the NHL General Manager of the Year Award; he was the first Lightning general manager to receive the honor. The team built by Yzerman set franchise records with 50 wins and 108 points during the regular season, and also led the league with 262 goals and 32 home wins.

In the 2017–18 season, the Lightning finished in first place in the Atlantic Division and made it to the Eastern Conference Finals before losing to the Washington Capitals. On September 11, 2018, with one year remaining on his contract, Yzerman announced that he would not be re-signing as the Lightning general manager, but would remain with the team as a senior advisor. Yzerman was succeeded by assistant general manager Julien BriseBois.

=== Return to Detroit ===
On April 19, 2019, the Red Wings announced that Yzerman had been hired as general manager of the team, while the existing general manager, Ken Holland, was promoted to a senior vice president role, though Holland would soon depart the organization and become the general manager and president of hockey operations of the Edmonton Oilers.

Yzerman's first draft as general manager of the Red Wings was the 2019 NHL entry draft, where the Red Wings selected defenceman Moritz Seider at 6th overall.

In 2019–20, Yzerman's first season as general manager, the Red Wings became the first team since the 2003–04 Pittsburgh Penguins to be mathematically eliminated from the playoffs before the trade deadline. The Red Wings clinched last place in the NHL for the first time since 1985–86 on March 10. The 2019–20 NHL season was suspended on March 12, 2020, due to the ongoing COVID-19 pandemic. On May 26, the NHL declared the regular season over and announced a 24-team format to award the 2020 Stanley Cup that did not include the Red Wings. The Red Wings .275 points percentage was the worst by an NHL team since the 1999–2000 Atlanta Thrashers. As the last place team in the league, the Red Wings held the best lottery odds at the first overall pick in the 2020 NHL entry draft, but dropped to 4th overall.

The Red Wings selected forward Lucas Raymond at 4th overall in the 2020 draft. For the 2020–21 season, the NHL realigned the divisions to accommodate travel restrictions due to the ongoing COVID-19 pandemic, each team would play their division opponents eight times, four at home and four away, for a total of 56 games. The Red Wings spent the 2020–21 season in the Central Division, finishing 7th and out of a playoff spot for the fifth year in a row.

Ahead of the 2021–22 season, the Red Wings, along with 29 other NHL teams, were required to produce a protected player list for the Seattle Kraken expansion draft. On July 21, 2021, the Seattle Kraken selected Dennis Cholowski from the Red Wings in the expansion draft. During the 2021 NHL entry draft, the Red Wings selected defenceman Simon Edvinsson with the 6th overall pick and goaltender Sebastian Cossa with the Dallas Stars' first round pick. In 2021–22, the Red Wings returned to the Atlantic division, finishing 6th in the division and being eliminated from the playoffs for the sixth consecutive season on April 9, 2022.

In the 2022 offseason, the Red Wings did not pick up the team option on the contract of head coach Jeff Blashill. On June 30, 2022, they hired Tampa Bay Lightning assistant coach Derek Lalonde as the team's head coach. Coincidentally, Blashill subsequently took the role that Lalonde had left in Tampa Bay.

During the 2022 NHL entry draft, the Red Wings selected centre Marco Kasper 8th overall. On July 13, Yzerman signed forward Dominik Kubalík to a two-year contract worth $5 million. During the 2022–23 season, Yzerman traded forward Filip Hronek along with a 2023 third-round draft pick to the Vancouver Canucks in exchange for a conditional 2023 New York Islanders first-round pick and the Canucks' 2023 second-round pick. The Red Wings' 2022–23 season ended without a playoff appearance for the seventh straight season after a shootout loss to the Buffalo Sabres on April 6, 2023.

At the 2023 NHL entry draft, the Red Wings made two selections in the first round. At 9th overall, Detroit selected forward Nate Danielson. The Red Wings also possessed the 17th overall selection of the New York Islanders, which they used to select defenceman Axel Sandin-Pellikka.

In the 2023 offseason, Yzerman made several key moves to position the Red Wings towards contention for the playoffs. On June 29, 2023, the Red Wings acquired forwards Kailer Yamamoto and Klim Kostin from the Edmonton Oilers in exchange for future considerations. The next day, Yamamoto was placed on waivers for the purposes of a buy out. In free agency, the Red Wings signed defenceman Justin Holl to a three-year contract and forward J. T. Compher to a five-year contract. On July 9, 2023, Yzerman traded Dominik Kubalik, prospect Donovan Sebrango, a conditional 2024 first-round pick and a 2024 fourth-round pick in exchange for forward Alex DeBrincat. The Red Wings subsequently signed DeBrincat, a restricted free agent, to a four-year contract worth $31.5 million.

During the 2023–24 season, Yzerman signed free agent former first-overall pick Patrick Kane to a one-year contract. Kane had been a free agent after recovering from a hip procedure in the offseason. The 2023–24 season was a more successful season for Detroit. They finished tied on points with the Washington Capitals for the final wildcard spot in the Eastern Conference, but were eliminated via a tiebreaker. In his post-season press conference Yzerman expressed excitement with the future of the organization.

The 2024 NHL entry draft was the first since 2016 in which Detroit picked outside of the top 10. The Red Wings selected forward Michael Brandsegg-Nygård with the 15th pick in the draft. Brandsegg-Nygård became the first Norwegian player to be selected in the first round of the NHL draft. The start of the 2024–25 season began poorly for Detroit, who sat 7th in the Atlantic division when they fired head coach Derek Lalonde on December 26, 2024, hiring Todd McLellan in his place. Detroit finished the season with a 39–35–8 record. With only 86 points, the Red Wings failed to qualify for the playoffs for a ninth-straight season, extending their franchise record playoff drought.

The Red Wings selected Carter Bear 13th overall in the 2025 NHL entry draft. On June 28, 2025, Yzerman acquired goaltender John Gibson from the Anaheim Ducks for two draft picks. On June 30, 2025, Yzerman resigned forward Patrick Kane to a one-year contract. The 2025–26 season was Detroit's first full season under head coach Todd McLellan. On March 6, 2026, the Red Wings acquired defenceman Justin Faulk from the St. Louis Blues with Justin Holl, prospect Dmitri Buchelnikov, the Red Wings' 2026 first-round pick and the 2026 third-round pick of the San Jose Sharks going the other way to St. Louis.

The 2025–26 season started well for Detroit, through their first 53 games, the Red Wings were 32–16–5, tied for first in the Eastern Conference with 69 points on January 25. In their final 29 games, however, the Red Wings went 9–15–5, falling outside the playoff picture and finishing 7 points back of the Ottawa Senators for the final Eastern Conference wildcard playoff spot. The Red Wings were eliminated from playoff contention for the tenth consecutive season after a 5–3 loss to the New Jersey Devils on April 11, 2026.

With the Buffalo Sabres ending their 14-season playoff drought, Detroit currently holds the longest active playoff drought in the NHL. They concluded their season with a 8–1 loss to the Florida Panthers, finishing the 2025–26 season 16th in the NHL with a 41–31–10 record. The Red Wings did not have a first round draft pick in the 2026 NHL entry draft, having traded it to the St. Louis Blues for Justin Faulk on March 6.

On July 15, 2026, the Red Wings announced that Yzerman would step down as general manager, instead becoming a senior advisor to owner Christopher Ilitch; however, he remained in the role until a successor was found. On September 15, Shawn Horcoff was named interim general manager.

=== Team Canada ===
On January 30, 2007, Hockey Canada named Yzerman the general manager of Team Canada for the 2007 IIHF World Championship in Moscow, where the team beat Finland 4–2 to win the championship.

On October 18, 2008, Yzerman was named executive director for the Canadian men's hockey team at the 2010 Winter Olympics. The Canadian team he put together went on to win the gold, the first gold won by a home team in ice hockey since the 1980 USA Olympic hockey team. Yzerman said he would consider coming back as head of the Canadian team in 2014. Yzerman went on saying, "I loved it, but it was very stressful. Given the chance to represent Canada and be the guy in charge, if somebody offered it to me, I didn't hesitate the first time, I wouldn't hesitate again."

In 2012, Yzerman was named executive director for the Canadian men's hockey team at the 2014 Winter Olympics. The Canadian team he put together went on to win their second straight gold medal for the first time since 1948 and 1952. They also became the first country to accomplish the feat since the Soviet Union/Unified Team won three consecutive gold medals in 1984, 1988, and 1992. Following Canada's 3–0 victory over Sweden in the gold medal game, Yzerman announced that he would not return as the executive director for Canada for the 2018 Winter Olympics.

== International play ==
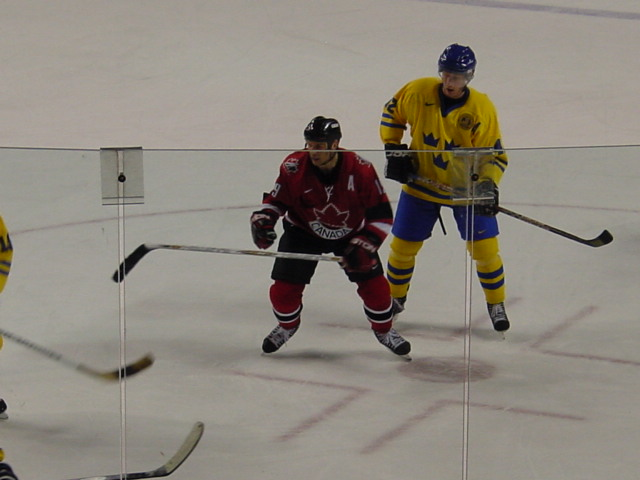
Yzerman (centre foreground) during the 2002 Winter Olympics

Yzerman has played for Canada in:

- 1983 World Junior Ice Hockey Championships
- 1984 Canada Cup
- 1985 World Ice Hockey Championships
- 1989 World Ice Hockey Championships
- 1990 World Ice Hockey Championships
- 1996 World Cup of Hockey
- 1998 Winter Olympics
- 2002 Winter Olympics

Yzerman was considered a leading candidate for the captaincy of Team Canada in 1998, along with Wayne Gretzky and Ray Bourque. Yzerman had led the Detroit Red Wings to the Stanley Cup during the previous season and was one of the longest-serving team captains. However, general manager Bobby Clarke instead selected Eric Lindros.

In late 2005, after Yzerman ruled himself out of a third Olympic appearance, Wayne Gretzky announced that no one would be allowed to wear jersey #19 for Canada for the 2006 Olympics in Yzerman's honour (#19 was later "unretired" by Yzerman when he managed Team Canada for the 2010 Olympics).

== Personal life ==
Yzerman and his wife Lisa Brennan have three daughters. They reside in Bloomfield Hills, Michigan. Yzerman resided in Hillsborough County, Florida, during his tenure with the Lightning. Yzerman has acquired naturalized United States citizenship as a result of his many years of residence in Michigan.

Yzerman was born in Cranbrook, British Columbia, but raised mainly in Nepean, Ontario. Not far from where Yzerman grew up, the Nepean Sportsplex named one of its indoor ice surfaces the Steve Yzerman Arena in 1997 in his honour. This is the home rink of the CCHL's Nepean Raiders, the Tier II Junior "A" team Yzerman played on during the 1980–81 season. The Raiders currently play in the Yzerman Division.

The CCHL divisions are named the Robinson and Yzerman Divisions after two of its most prominent alumni, Yzerman and Larry Robinson.

== Career statistics ==
=== Regular season and playoffs ===
			Regular season					Playoffs
Season	Team	League	GP	G	A	Pts	PIM	GP	G	A	Pts	PIM
1980–81	Nepean Raiders	CJHL	50	38	54	92	44	—	—	—	—	—
1981–82	Peterborough Petes	OHL	58	21	43	64	65	6	0	1	1	16
1982–83	Peterborough Petes	OHL	56	42	49	91	65	4	1	4	5	0
1983–84	Detroit Red Wings	NHL	80	39	48	87	33	4	3	3	6	0
1984–85	Detroit Red Wings	NHL	80	30	59	89	58	3	2	1	3	2
1985–86	Detroit Red Wings	NHL	51	14	28	42	16	—	—	—	—	—
1986–87	Detroit Red Wings	NHL	80	31	59	90	43	16	5	13	18	8
1987–88	Detroit Red Wings	NHL	64	50	52	102	44	3	1	3	4	6
1988–89	Detroit Red Wings	NHL	80	65	90	155	61	6	5	5	10	2
1989–90	Detroit Red Wings	NHL	79	62	65	127	79	—	—	—	—	—
1990–91	Detroit Red Wings	NHL	80	51	57	108	34	7	3	3	6	4
1991–92	Detroit Red Wings	NHL	79	45	58	103	64	11	3	5	8	12
1992–93	Detroit Red Wings	NHL	84	58	79	137	44	7	4	3	7	4
1993–94	Detroit Red Wings	NHL	58	24	58	82	36	3	1	3	4	0
1994–95	Detroit Red Wings	NHL	47	12	26	38	40	15	4	8	12	0
1995–96	Detroit Red Wings	NHL	80	36	59	95	64	18	8	12	20	4
1996–97	Detroit Red Wings	NHL	81	22	63	85	78	20	7	6	13	4
1997–98	Detroit Red Wings	NHL	75	24	45	69	46	22	6	18	24	22
1998–99	Detroit Red Wings	NHL	80	29	45	74	42	10	9	4	13	0
1999–00	Detroit Red Wings	NHL	78	35	44	79	34	8	0	4	4	0
2000–01	Detroit Red Wings	NHL	54	18	34	52	18	1	0	0	0	0
2001–02	Detroit Red Wings	NHL	52	13	35	48	18	23	6	17	23	10
2002–03	Detroit Red Wings	NHL	16	2	6	8	8	4	0	1	1	2
2003–04	Detroit Red Wings	NHL	75	18	33	51	46	11	3	2	5	0
2005–06	Detroit Red Wings	NHL	61	14	20	34	18	4	0	4	4	4
NHL totals			1,514	692	1,063	1,755	924	196	70	115	185	84

=== International ===
Year	Team	Event	Results	GP	G	A	Pts	PIM
1983	Canada	WJC	3rd place, bronze medalist(s)	7	2	3	5	2
1984	Canada	CC	1st place, gold medalist(s)	4	0	0	0	0
1985	Canada	WC	2nd place, silver medalist(s)	10	3	4	7	6
1989	Canada	WC	2nd place, silver medalist(s)	8	5	7	12	2
1990	Canada	WC	4th	10	9	10	19	8
1996	Canada	WCH	2nd place, silver medalist(s)	6	2	1	3	0
1998	Canada	OLY	4th	6	1	1	2	10
2002	Canada	OLY	1st place, gold medalist(s)	6	2	4	6	2
Junior totals				7	2	3	5	2
Senior totals				50	22	27	49	28

== Awards and achievements ==
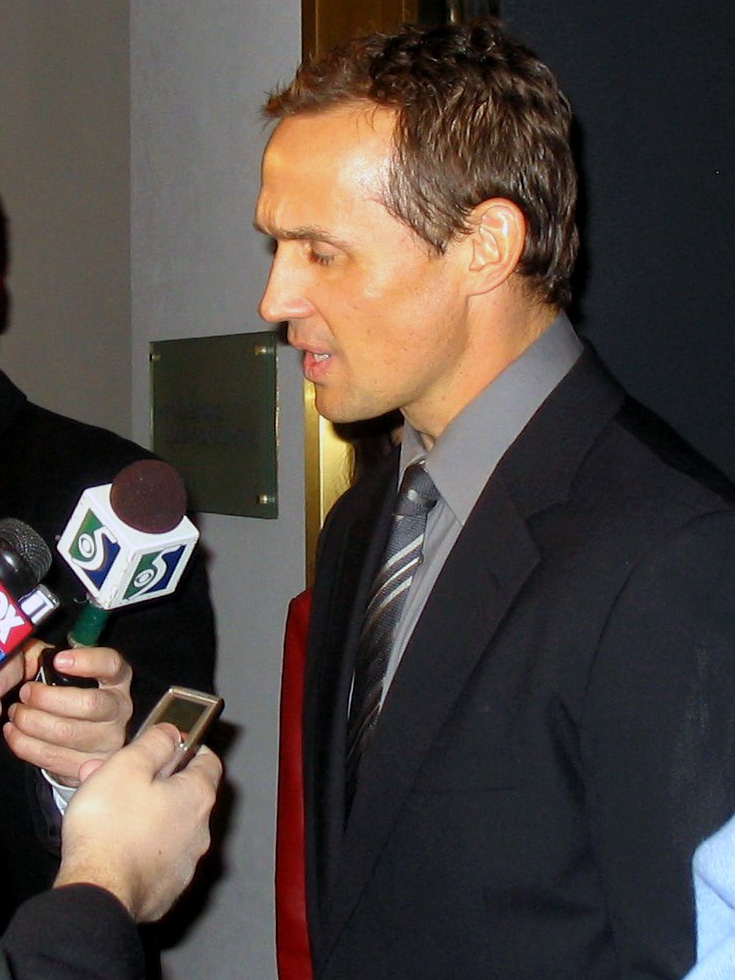
Yzerman speaking to the media during his induction ceremony into the Michigan Sports Hall of Fame

- NHL All-Star Game Roster – 1984 (first 18-year old to be selected to the roster), 1988, 1989, 1990, 1991, 1992, 1993, 1997, 1999, 2000;
- NHL first team All-Star – 2000;
- Lester B. Pearson Award – 1989;
- Conn Smythe Trophy – 1998;
- Frank J. Selke Trophy – 2000;
- Stanley Cup champion (as player) – 1997, 1998, 2002;
- Stanley Cup champion (as executive) – 2008;
- Bill Masterton Memorial Trophy – 2003;
- Lester Patrick Trophy – 2006;
- Eighth in NHL history in points, tenth in goals and ninth in assists;
- First in Red Wings history in assists; second in points and goals; fourth in games played; second all-time in seasons and seventh all-time in games played with only one NHL franchise;
- Second longest-serving captain for a team in league history (19 seasons, 1,303 games);
- Number (19) retired with Canadian Men's National Team; (#19 later worn at the 2010 Vancouver Olympics by Joe Thornton)
- Named vice-president of Detroit Red Wings – 2006;
- Detroit Red Wings #19 retired on January 2, 2007;
- Named general manager of Team Canada – 2008;
- Was ranked sixth in The Hockey News "The Top 60 Since 1967 – The Best Players of the Post Expansion Era";
- Inducted into Ottawa Sports Hall of Fame – January 11, 2008;
- Inducted into the Michigan Sports Hall of Fame – February 11, 2008;
- Inducted into Canada's Sports Hall of Fame – 2008;
- Inducted into the Hockey Hall of Fame – 2009;
- Named general manager and vice-president of the Tampa Bay Lightning – May 2010;
- Inducted into the IIHF Hall of Fame – 2014;
- Named to the Order of Hockey in Canada by Hockey Canada – 2014;
- NHL General Manager of the Year Award – 2015;
- Named on the 100 Greatest NHL Players list for the NHL's Centennial Anniversary – 2017;
- Named general manager and executive vice-president of the Detroit Red Wings – April 2019

== See also ==
- List of NHL statistical leaders
- Captain (ice hockey)
- List of NHL players with 1,000 points
- List of NHL players with 500 goals
- List of NHL players with 1,000 games played
- List of NHL players who spent their entire career with one franchise

Awards and achievements
Preceded by Murray Craven	Detroit Red Wings first-round draft pick 1983	Succeeded by Shawn Burr
Preceded by Mark Messier	Winner of the Lester B. Pearson Award; 1989	Succeeded by Mario Lemieux
Preceded by Mike Vernon	Winner of the Conn Smythe Trophy; 1998	Succeeded by Joe Nieuwendyk
Preceded by Jere Lehtinen	Winner of the Frank J. Selke Trophy; 2000	Succeeded by John Madden
Preceded by Saku Koivu	Winner of the Bill Masterton Trophy; 2003	Succeeded by Bryan Berard
Sporting positions
Preceded by Danny Gare	Detroit Red Wings captain 1986–2006	Succeeded by Nicklas Lidström
Preceded by Tom Kurvers	General manager of the Tampa Bay Lightning; 2010–2018	Succeeded by Julien BriseBois
Preceded by Ken Holland	General manager of the Detroit Red Wings; 2019–2026	Succeeded by Shawn Horcoff (interim)
