= Julien BriseBois =

Canadian ice hockey executive

- Born: January 24, 1977 (age 49); Greenfield Park, Quebec, Canada
- Occupation: General manager
- Years active: 2010–present
- Employer: Tampa Bay Lightning
- Organization: National Hockey League

Julien BriseBois (born January 24, 1977) is a Canadian hockey executive. He is the general manager for the Tampa Bay Lightning in the National Hockey League (NHL) and their American Hockey League (AHL) affiliate, the Syracuse Crunch.

== Career ==
=== Montreal Canadiens ===
A native of Greenfield Park, Quebec, Brisebois was employed by the Heenan Blaikie law firm before joining the Montreal Canadiens. During that time he worked in sports law, where he represented several NHL and Major League Baseball clubs in arbitration cases as well as acting as an advisor in contract negotiations. Brisebois also participated in the reform of the constitution and by-laws of the Quebec Major Junior Hockey League.

Brisebois spent nine seasons with the Montreal Canadiens after joining the organization on September 1, 2001, as director of legal affairs. In July 2003, he added director of hockey operations to his duties before being named vice president of hockey operations on July 24, 2006. In this capacity, Brisebois oversaw the Canadiens' AHL affiliate, the Hamilton Bulldogs. The Bulldogs won the 2007 Calder Cup during the first season under Brisebois' direction. BriseBois would later hire future National Hockey League head coach, Guy Boucher, to coach the Bulldogs on June 29, 2009. Boucher won the Louis A. R. Pieri Memorial Award as the American Hockey League's most outstanding coach for the 2009–10 season. Over three seasons the Bulldogs' amassed a record of 137–78–25 under Brisebois before he was hired by the Tampa Bay Lightning.

=== Tampa Bay Lightning ===
On July 16, 2010, Brisebois was hired by Lightning general manager Steve Yzerman to serve as assistant general manager. Brisebois duties included the managing of the Lightning's AHL affiliate, the Norfolk Admirals. On August 9, 2010, Brisebois hired future Lightning head coach, Jon Cooper to be the Norfolk Admirals head coach. During the 2011–12 season the Admirals went on a 28-game win streak to set the record for the longest win streak in professional hockey. The Admirals would then go on and win the Calder Cup championship that season. That same season also saw Cory Conacher win the Dudley "Red" Garrett Memorial Award, Willie Marshall Award and Les Cunningham Award. Admirals' head coach, Jon Cooper, also won the Louis A. R. Pieri Memorial Award. Brisebois continued in his role as General Manager of the Lightning's AHL farm team when the team switched their affiliation to the Syracuse Crunch. The Crunch saw a string of success under Brisebois guidance. The team reached the Calder Cup finals two times, however, the team lost to the Grand Rapids Griffins both times.

On September 11, 2018, Brisebois was named as general manager of the Tampa Bay Lightning. Prior to his promotion Brisebois had assisted in all aspects of player personnel decisions, analytics, player development, contract preparation and negotiation, as well as salary arbitration for the Lightning and the Syracuse Crunch of the American Hockey League. Brisebois also oversaw the interpretation of the NHL's collective bargaining agreement and the salary cap for Tampa Bay. Additionally, a number of players developed into NHL regulars under his management of the Lightning's AHL affiliates. Some of those players included J.T. Brown, Anthony Cirelli, Yanni Gourde, Radko Gudas, Tyler Johnson, Alex Killorn, Nikita Kucherov, Ondrej Palat, Cedric Paquette, Andrej Sustr, and Andrei Vasilevskiy.

In Brisebois' first season as general manager, the Lightning captured their first Presidents' Trophy in franchise history along with the franchise's 4th Atlantic Division title. The team also tied the single season record for wins in NHL history (62). Brisebois also signed Jon Cooper to a multi-year contract extension on March 26, 2019.

On September 28, 2020, Brisebois won his first Stanley Cup with the Lightning. On July 7, 2021, he won his second Stanley Cup with the Lightning.

== Education ==
Brisebois is a graduate of the University of Montreal Faculty of Law and earned a master's degree in business administration from the John Molson School of Business at Concordia University. He is a member of the Quebec Bar, the American Bar Association and the Sports Lawyers Association. He has been a member of the AHL's Competition Committee, the AHL's Player Development Committee and the AHL's CBA Committee. In 2013, Brisebois won the John Molson School of Business "MBA Alumnus of the Year" award. In 2016, Brisebois was awarded the Distinction Award by the Association des diplômés en droit de l'Université de Montréal (ADDUM).

== Awards and achievements ==
- Calder Cup champion (AHL): 2006–07, 2011–12
- Stanley Cup champion (NHL): 2019–20, 2020–21

Sporting positions
Preceded by Steve Yzerman	General manager of the Tampa Bay Lightning; 2018–present	Incumbent
