= Tampa Bay Lightning =

National Hockey League team in Tampa, Florida

- 2026–27 Tampa Bay Lightning season
- Conference: Eastern
- Division: Atlantic
- Founded: 1992
- History: Tampa Bay Lightning; 1992–present
- Home arena: Benchmark International Arena
- City: Tampa, Florida
- Team colors: Blue, white, black
- Media: Scripps Sports (WXPX-TV); 102.5 The Bone
- Owner(s): Vinik Sports Group, LLC (Jeffrey Vinik, chairman)
- General manager: Julien BriseBois
- Head coach: Jon Cooper
- Captain: Victor Hedman
- Minor league affiliates: Syracuse Crunch (AHL); Orlando Solar Bears (ECHL)
- Stanley Cups: 3 (2003–04, 2019–20, 2020–21)
- Conference championships: 4 (2003–04, 2014–15, 2019–20, 2021–22) (Note: Though the Lightning won the Prince of Wales Trophy and advanced into the Stanley Cup Final in 2021, this does not count as a conference championship. Due to restrictions brought on by the COVID-19 pandemic, the 2020–21 NHL season saw a realignment of teams into new divisions, without any conferences.)
- Presidents' Trophies: 1 (2018–19)
- Division championships: 4 (2002–03, 2003–04, 2017–18, 2018–19)
- Official website: nhl.com/lightning

The Tampa Bay Lightning (colloquially known as the Bolts) are a professional ice hockey team based in Tampa, Florida. The Lightning compete in the National Hockey League (NHL) as a member of the Atlantic Division in the Eastern Conference. They play their home games at Benchmark International Arena in Downtown Tampa. The Lightning are one of two NHL franchises based in Florida, with the other being the Florida Panthers.

The franchise is owned by Vinik Sports Group, with an investor group led by Doug Ostrover and Marc Lipschultz holding a majority stake. Jeffrey Vinik remains chairman and governor during a transition period, while Julien BriseBois is the general manager. Jon Cooper has served as head coach since March 2013, and is the longest-tenured active head coach in the NHL.

The Lightning were founded as an expansion team on December 6, 1990, and began play in the 1992–93 NHL season. The team has won three Stanley Cup championships in 2004, 2020, and 2021, and also played in two additional Stanley Cup Final series in 2015 and 2022. The team's sustained success in the time period from 2015 to 2022 led some outlets to regard the Lightning as a modern NHL dynasty within that time span. Additionally, the Lightning won the Presidents' Trophy in 2019 after they tied the then-all-time record for regular season wins in the 2018–19 season with 62.

== History ==
=== Early years (1992–2000) ===
==== Bringing hockey to Tampa ====
In the late 1980s, the NHL announced it would expand the league. Two rival groups from the Tampa Bay Area decided to bid for a franchise: a St. Petersburg-based group fronted by future Hartford Whalers/Carolina Hurricanes owners Peter Karmanos Jr. and Jim Rutherford, and a Tampa-based group fronted by brothers Phil and Tony Esposito and Mel Lowell. One of the Esposito group's key backers, the Pritzker family, backed out a few months before the bid, to be replaced by a consortium of Japanese businesses headed by Kokusai Green, a golf course and resort operator. Although it appeared on paper that the Karmanos/Rutherford group had more financial resources, it only wanted to pay $29 million of the $50 million expansion fee before starting operations. In contrast, the Esposito/Kokusai Green group was one of the few groups willing to pay the full $50 million fee up front. The Esposito group won the expansion franchise on December 6, 1990, and named the team the Lightning, after Tampa Bay's status as the "Lightning Capital of North America."

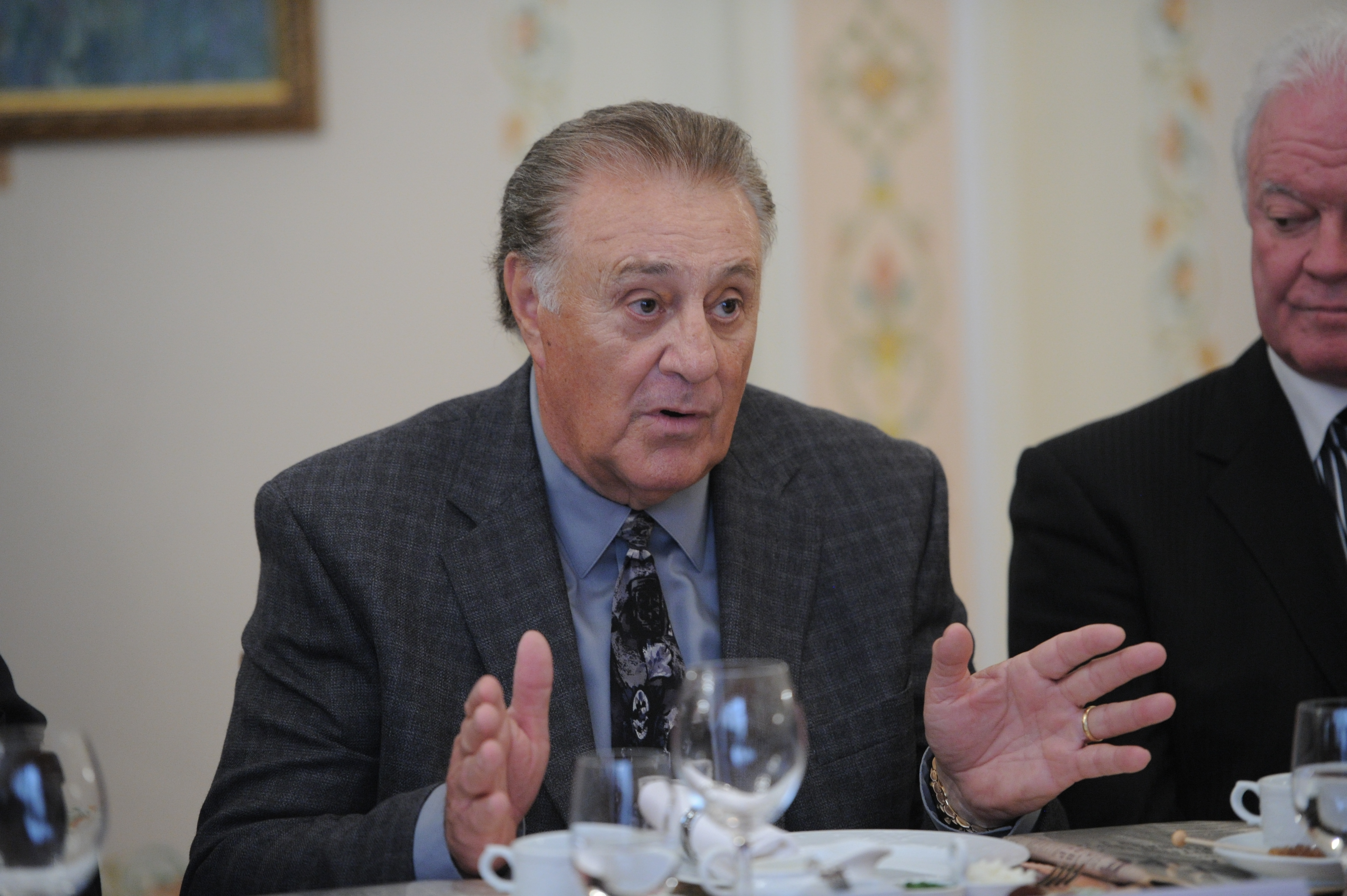
Phil Esposito fronted an ownership group that was later awarded an NHL franchise in 1992.

Phil Esposito assigned himself president and general manager, while Tony became chief scout, and Mel Lowell executive vice-president and treasurer. Terry Crisp, who played for the Philadelphia Flyers when they won two Stanley Cups in the mid-1970s and coached the Calgary Flames to a Stanley Cup in 1989, was hired as the first head coach. In 1991, Angus Montagu, 12th Duke of Manchester, announced that a company of which he was a director would raise millions of dollars in investments in the Lightning, but his plans were unsuccessful and he was later convicted of wire fraud.

The Lightning played their first preseason game in September 1992 against the Minnesota North Stars. Manon Rhéaume became the first woman to play in any major professional sports league when she suited up for the Lightning in a preseason game, stopping seven of nine shots in goal. The Lightning played their first regular season game on October 7, 1992, in Tampa's Expo Hall at the Florida State Fairgrounds. They defeated the visiting Chicago Blackhawks, winning 7–3 with four goals by Chris Kontos. The team rose to the top of the Campbell Conference's Norris Division within a month, behind Kontos' initial torrid scoring pace and a breakout season by forward Brian Bradley. However, the team finished in last place with a 23–54–7 record for 53 points.

The following season Lightning shifted to the Eastern Conference's Atlantic Division, as well as move into the Florida Suncoast Dome (a building originally designed for baseball) in St. Petersburg, which was reconfigured for hockey and renamed the "ThunderDome". The team acquired goaltender Daren Puppa, left wing goal scorer Petr Klíma, and veteran forward Denis Savard. The Lightning finished last in the Atlantic Division in 1993–94 with a record of 30–43–11. Another disappointing season followed in the lockout-shortened 1994–95 season with a record of 17–28–3.

==== On-ice and off-ice struggles ====
In the 1995–96 season, backed by Bradley's team-leading 79 points, the Lightning qualified for the playoffs. Playing the Philadelphia Flyers in the first round, the Lightning split the opening two games in Philadelphia before taking game three in overtime before a ThunderDome crowd of 28,183. This was the largest crowd for an NHL game, a record that stood until the 2003 Heritage Classic in Edmonton; and it still stands as the largest crowd at a Stanley Cup playoffs game. The Lightning lost the series in six games.

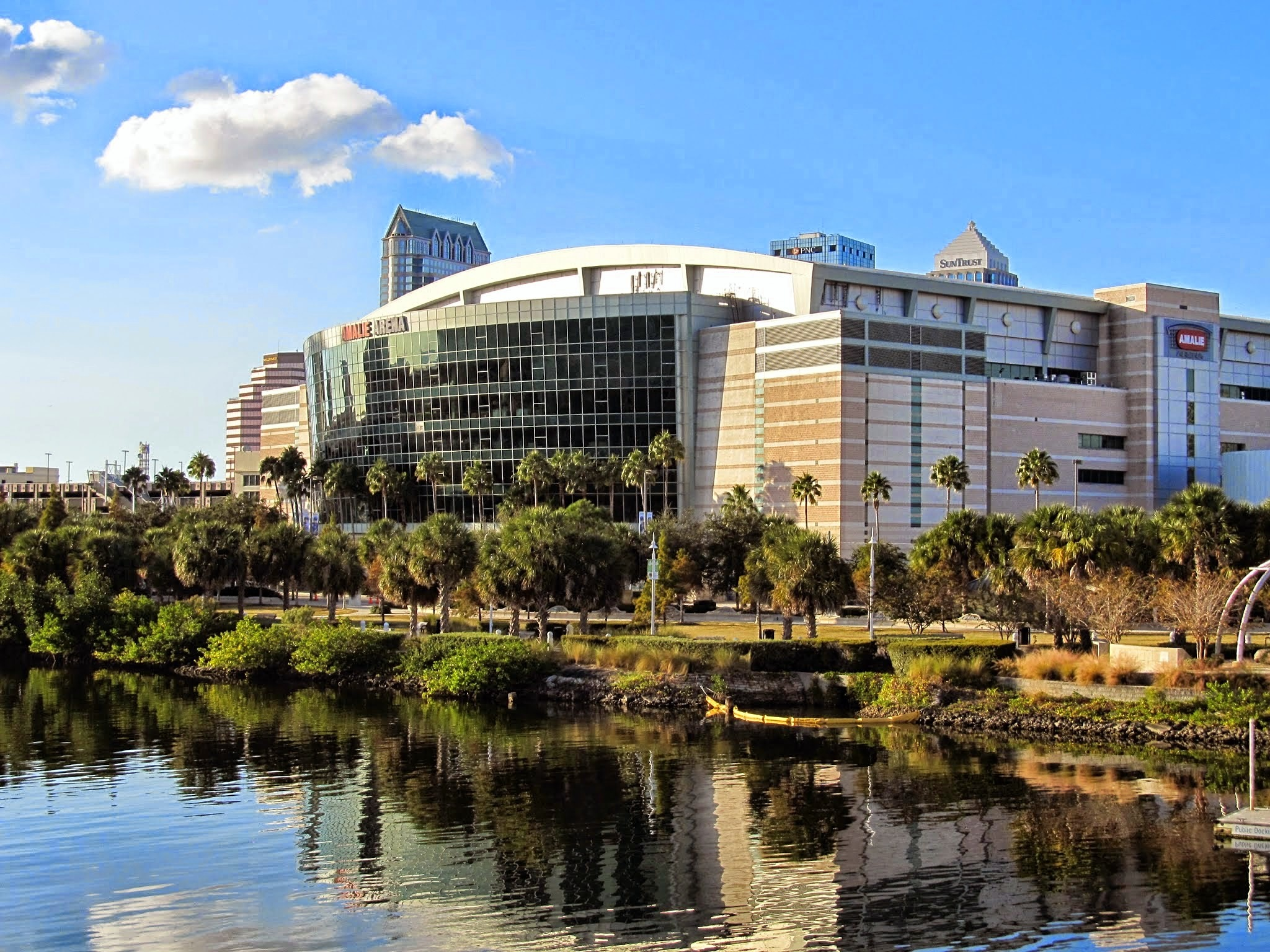
The Lightning moved to their present home, the Ice Palace (now Benchmark International Arena), during the 1996 off-season.

The Lightning moved into the current arena in downtown Tampa, the Ice Palace (now Benchmark International Arena) for the 1996–97 season. They acquired Dino Ciccarelli from the Detroit Red Wings during the 1996 offseason. Puppa developed a back injury that kept him out of all but six games during the season. Bradley also lost time to a series of concussions that would limit him to a total of 49 games from 1996 until his retirement in December 1999.

Crisp was fired 11 games into the 1997–98 season and replaced by Jacques Demers. The team did not improve and the Lightning lost 55 games.

The Lightning's plunge to the bottom of the NHL was due to inattentive ownership by Kokusai Green. Rumors abounded as early as the team's second season that the Lightning were on the brink of bankruptcy and that the team was part of a money laundering scheme for the yakuza (Japanese crime families). Its scouting operation consisted of Tony Esposito and several satellite dishes. The Internal Revenue Service investigated the team in 1994 and 1995, and nearly threatened to put a tax lien on the franchise for $750,000 in back taxes. The situation led longtime NHL broadcaster and writer Stan Fischler to call the Lightning a "skating vaudeville show."

Even in their first playoff season, the team was awash in red ink and Kokusai Green was looking to sell the team. However, its asking price of $230 million for the team and the lease with the Ice Palace deterred buyers. A possible sale was further hampered by the team's murky ownership structure; many team officials (including Crisp) did not know who really owned the team. Kokusai Green's owner, Takashi Okubo, had never met with the Espositos or with NHL officials in person prior to being awarded the Lightning franchise, and never watched his team play during his seven years as owner.

Nearly all of Kokusai Green's investment in the team and the Ice Palace came in the form of loans, leaving the team constantly short of cash. At least one prospective buyer pulled out after expressing doubts that Okubo even existed. In fact, the first time anyone connected with the Lightning or the NHL even saw Okubo was in the spring of 1998. Esposito was forced into several trades just to keep the team above water. The team's financial situation was a considerable concern to NHL officials; rumors surfaced that the NHL was seriously considering taking control of the team if Okubo failed to find a buyer by the summer of 1998.

Forbes wrote an article in late 1997 calling the Lightning a financial nightmare, with a debt equal to 236% of its value, the highest of any major North American sports franchise. Even though the Ice Palace was built for hockey and the Lightning were the only major tenant, Forbes called the team's deal with the arena a lemon since it would not result in much revenue for 30 years. It was also behind on paying state sales taxes and federal payroll taxes.

In 1998, Kokusai Green found a buyer. Although William Davidson, longtime owner of the Detroit Pistons of the National Basketball Association (NBA) and owner of the IHL's Detroit Vipers, was thought to be the frontrunner, the buyer turned out to be insurance tycoon and motivational speaker Art Williams, who previously owned the Birmingham Barracudas of the Canadian Football League (CFL). The team was $102 million in debt at the time the sale closed. Williams knew very little about hockey, but was very visible and outspoken, and immediately pumped an additional $6 million into the team's payroll. He also cleared most of the debt from the Kokusai Green era. After taking control, Williams publicly assured the Espositos that their jobs were safe, only to fire them two games into the 1998–99 season. He then gave Demers complete control of hockey operations as both coach and general manager. Williams was widely seen as being in over his head. The Lightning drafted Vincent Lecavalier first overall in 1998.

=== Playoff contention and first Cup (2000–2010) ===
By the spring of 1999, Williams was looking to sell the team. He had not attended a game in some time because "this team broke my heart". He lost $20 million in the 1998–99 season alone, as much money in one year as he had estimated he could have reasonably lost in five years. Williams sold the team for $115 million—$2 million less than he had paid for the team a year earlier—to Detroit Pistons owner Bill Davidson, who had almost bought the team a year earlier.

Davidson remained in Detroit, but appointed Tom Wilson as team president to handle day-to-day management of the team. Wilson immediately fired Demers and persuaded Ottawa Senators general manager Rick Dudley to take over as the Lightning's new general manager; Dudley, in turn, brought Vipers coach Steve Ludzik in as the team's new head coach. Even with a wholesale transfer of talent from Detroit to Tampa, the Lightning lost 54 games in 1999–2000 and 52 in 2000–01, becoming the first team in NHL history to post four straight 50-loss seasons. Ludzik was replaced in early 2001 by assistant coach John Tortorella. At the 2001 trade deadline, the team acquired goaltender Nikolai Khabibulin from the Phoenix Coyotes for three players and a draft pick.

The 2001–02 season, Tortorella's first full year behind the bench, saw some improvement. Martin St. Louis was having a breakout season until he broke his leg midway through the season and was injured for the remainder of the season. By mid-February, the Lightning were well out of playoff contention. Dudley resigned amidst the team's losing streaks, being replaced by assistant Jay Feaster. Tortorella stripped Lecavalier of the captaincy due to contract negotiations that made him miss the start of the season.

==== Two dream seasons and first Stanley Cup championship (2002–2004) ====
In 2002–03, the team was led by the goaltending of Nikolai Khabibulin and the scoring efforts of Lecavalier, St. Louis, Fredrik Modin, Richards and Ruslan Fedotenko. They won the division by one point, giving them home-ice advantage in their first-round matchup with the Capitals. In the first round of the playoffs, the Lightning fell two games behind in the series but followed the two losses with four consecutive wins for their first playoff series win in franchise history. However, in the conference semifinals, they went down in five games to the New Jersey Devils.

The Lightning's improvement continued through the 2003–04 regular season, finishing with a record of 46–22–8–6 for 106 points. In the first round of the playoffs, the Lightning ousted the New York Islanders in five games, with Khabibulin posting shutouts in games one, three, and four. In the second round, the Lightning defeated the Montreal Canadiens in a four-game sweep. They then faced the Philadelphia Flyers in the conference finals, winning in seven games to gain a berth to the Stanley Cup Final. Their opponent in the Final was the Calgary Flames. Ruslan Fedotenko scored both Lightning goals in their game seven victory. Brad Richards, who had 26 points in the postseason, won the Conn Smythe Trophy as the most valuable player of the playoffs. Tortorella won the Jack Adams Award as the NHL's coach of the year. The Lightning became the southernmost team to win the Stanley Cup, an accomplishment since surpassed by the Florida Panthers. Martin St. Louis led the team and the NHL with 94 points, and won the Hart Memorial Trophy as the NHL's most valuable player. St. Louis also won the Lester B. Pearson Award for the NHL's most outstanding player as voted by the NHL Players' Association. A season of superlatives was capped with one final accolade, as The Sporting News named general manager Jay Feaster as the league's executive of the year for 2003–04.

==== Post-championship disappointments (2004–2008) ====
The Lightning had to wait a year to defend their title due to the 2004–05 NHL lockout, during which goaltender Khabibulin left in free agency. In 2005–06, they made the playoffs, but lost to the Ottawa Senators in five games in the first round.

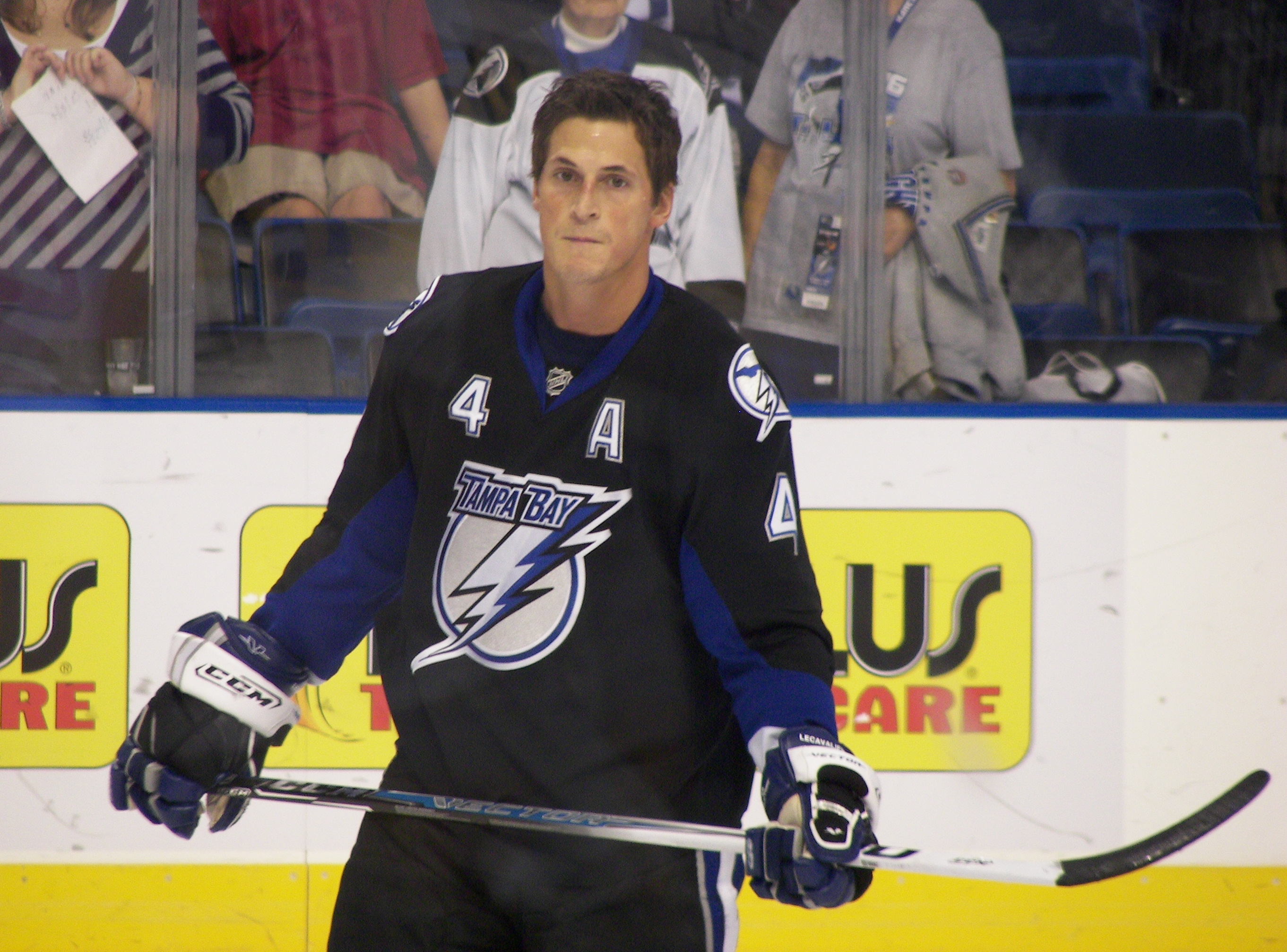
During the 2006–07 season, Vincent Lecavalier broke the then franchise record for most points, and goals in a single season.

During the offseason, the Lightning traded Fredrik Modin and Fredrik Norrena to the Columbus Blue Jackets in exchange for goaltender Marc Denis in an effort to replace the departing John Grahame, who had signed with the Carolina Hurricanes. However, free agent Johan Holmqvist would receive the majority of playing time and most of the club's wins. Vincent Lecavalier broke the franchise record for most points in a season, finishing with 108. Lecavalier also broke the franchise's goal-scoring record, finishing with a league-leading 52 goals. The Lightning were eliminated in the playoffs, losing game six to the New Jersey Devils in the conference quarterfinals.

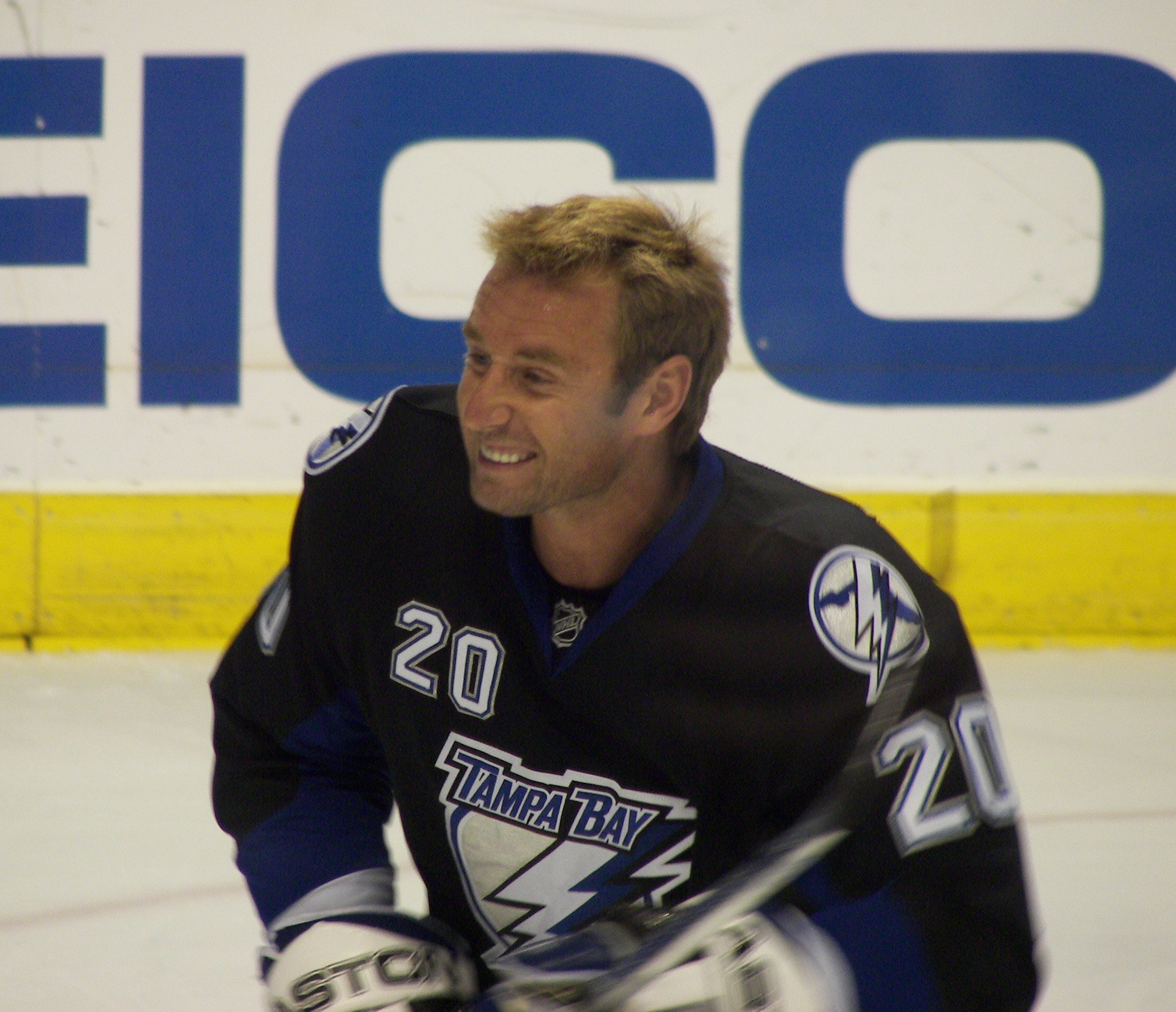
Václav Prospal with the Lightning in 2007.

Following their playoff exit, on August 7, 2007, Absolute Hockey Enterprises, a group led by Doug MacLean, announced it had signed a purchase agreement for the team and the leasehold on the St. Pete Times Forum. The group announced it planned to keep the team in Tampa. However, the sale was canceled in November, 2007, when Absolute failed to pay an initial $5 million. On February 13, 2008, Palace Sports & Entertainment agreed to sell the Lightning to OK Hockey LLC, a group headed by Oren Koules, a producer of the Saw horror movies, and Len Barrie, a former NHL player and real estate developer.

During the 2007–08 season, the team was active at the trade deadline. Trades included Václav Prospal's trade to the Philadelphia Flyers in exchange for prospect Alexandre Picard and a conditional draft pick. Additionally, former Conn Smythe Trophy winner Brad Richards and goaltender Johan Holmqvist were traded to the Dallas Stars in exchange for goaltender Mike Smith and forwards Jussi Jokinen and Jeff Halpern, as well as a fourth-round draft pick in 2009. The team significantly declined and finished with 71 points. Upon winning the draft lottery, they would use their first overall pick to select Steven Stamkos.

Head coach John Tortorella was fired by the Lightning following the season. At the time working as an NHL analyst for ESPN, Barry Melrose stated on June 4 during an episode of Pardon the Interruption that he missed coaching and would entertain any NHL coaching offers. He stated, "I miss not having a dog in the fight." Melrose was hired as coach soon after.

==== Arrival of Steven Stamkos (2008–2010) ====
Leading up to the start of the 2008–09 season, the Lightning centered their promotional efforts around Stamkos, including a website with the slogan "Seen Stamkos?" On July 4, 2008, Dan Boyle, despite coming off a recent contract extension, was traded (along with Brad Lukowich) to the San Jose Sharks in exchange for Matt Carle, Ty Wishart, a first-round draft pick in 2009 and a fourth-round pick in 2010. Boyle was pressured to waive his no-trade clause by Tampa Bay's ownership, who said they would otherwise place him on waivers. Former coach Tortorella later labeled the owners as "cowboys" and said he had zero respect for them. Frustrated at interference in the team's hockey operations by Barrie and Koules, seven days later, Jay Feaster resigned as general manager.

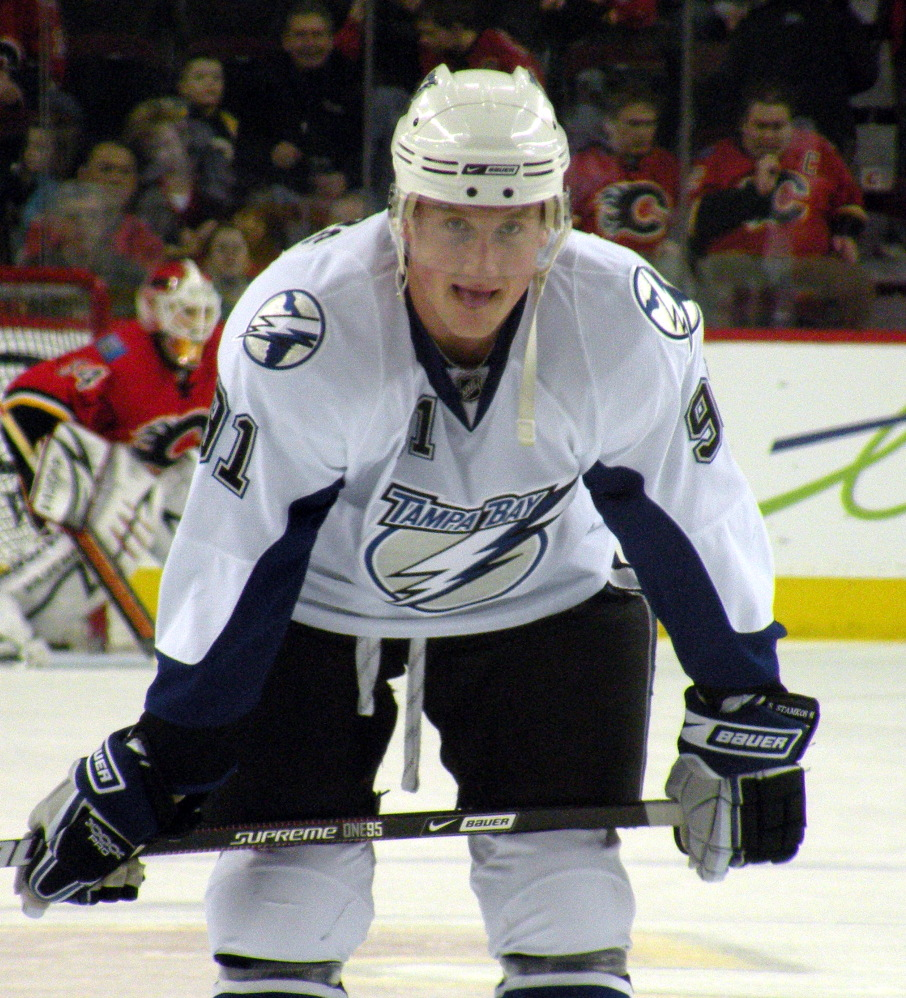
Steven Stamkos (pictured in March 2009) was drafted first overall by the Lightning in the 2008 NHL entry draft.

The Lightning opened the 2008–09 season in the Czech Republic against the New York Rangers as a part of the NHL's regular season "Premiere" that selects several teams to open the regular season in Europe. The Lightning did not get off to a great start as hoped, and Melrose was eventually fired by the Lightning with a 5–7–4 record. Rick Tocchet, who had been hired as assistant coach during the previous offseason, was promoted to interim head coach. After the firing of Melrose, the Lightning went 19–33–14 and would finish the season 24–40–18 with 66 points.

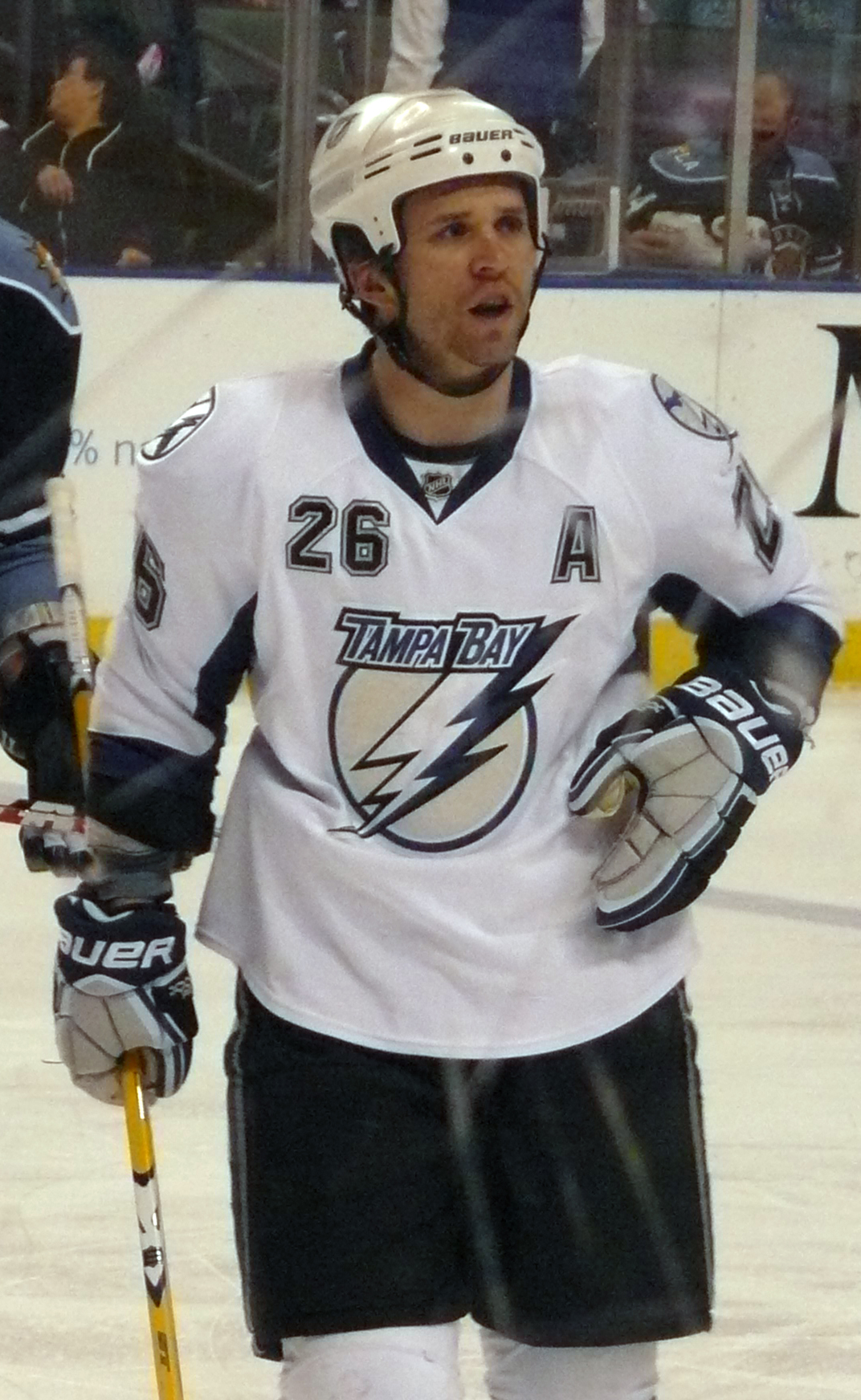
Martin St. Louis with the Lightning in March 2010. He signed a four-year extension with the team in the 2010 off-season.

With the second overall pick in the 2009 NHL entry draft, the Lightning selected Swedish defenseman Victor Hedman. In the 2009 offseason, the Lightning removed the interim status of Rick Tocchet, making him the full-time head coach. During the 2009–10 season, Stamkos scored 51 goals in his second NHL season along with 44 assists and 95 points. His 51 goals earned him a share of the Maurice "Rocket" Richard Trophy by tying for the NHL lead in goals with Sidney Crosby. During the season, the team was sold to Boston investment banker Jeffrey Vinik. Following the late-season collapse, Vinik cleaned house, firing both head coach Rick Tocchet and general manager Brian Lawton on April 12, 2010, one day after the season ended.

=== Steve Yzerman era (2010–2018) ===
==== 2011 run to the Eastern Conference finals (2010–2011) ====
In May 2010, Vinik hired Steve Yzerman as general manager. Yzerman then hired Guy Boucher from the Montreal Canadiens organization to succeed Rick Tocchet as the head coach two weeks later. In the offseason, the Lightning re-signed Martin St. Louis to a four-year, $22.5 million contract extension. They also traded defenseman Matt Walker and Tampa Bay's fourth-round pick in 2011 for winger Simon Gagné.

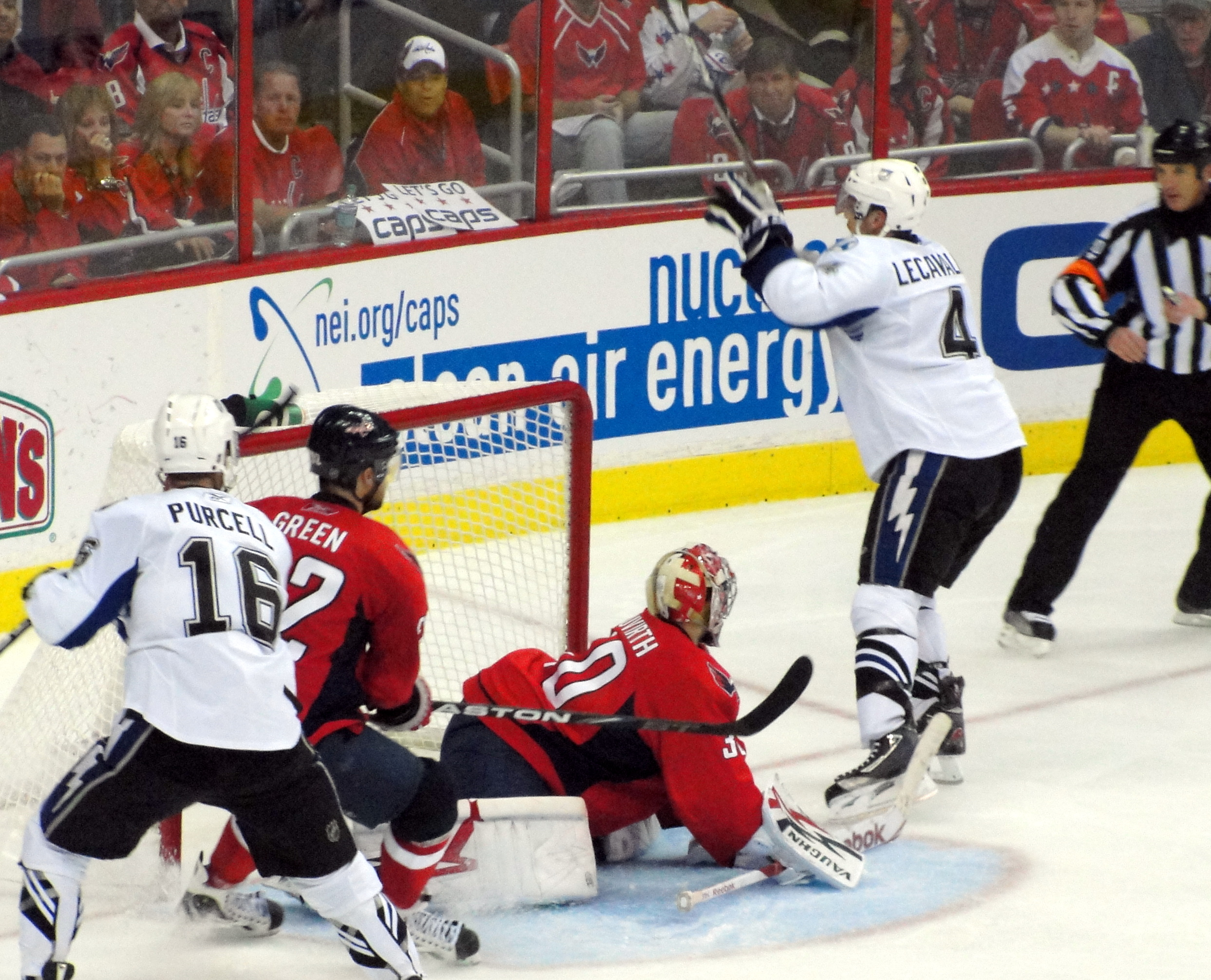
Lecavalier scores the game-winning goal in game two of the 2011 conference semifinals.

During the 2010–11 season, the team acquired veteran Dwayne Roloson from the New York Islanders. The Lightning compiled a 46–25–11 record with 103 points, matching a franchise record for wins in a season. In the 2011 playoffs, Tampa Bay came back from a 3–1 series deficit in the conference quarterfinals to defeat the Pittsburgh Penguins in seven games. In the conference semifinals, the Lightning swept the top-seeded Washington Capitals. Tampa Bay played the Boston Bruins in the conference finals, but lost in seven games.

==== Transition seasons (2011–2013) ====
The Lightning finished the 2011–12 season with a 38–36–8 record, failing to make the playoffs. Individually, Steven Stamkos scored a franchise-record 60 goals. Stamkos was also second in the NHL in points with 97, and was a finalist for both the Hart Memorial Trophy for the first time and the Ted Lindsay Award for the second consecutive season.

During the 2012–13 season, head coach Guy Boucher was dismissed following a 7–16–1 record. Syracuse Crunch head coach Jon Cooper was hired as the head coach.

On June 27, 2013, the Lightning exercised one of their two compliance buyouts on captain Vincent Lecavalier. The team stated the move was made not because of Lecavalier's play on the ice, but because of how his contract affected the team's salary cap, which would have been more than $7 million per year until its expiration after the 2019–20 season.

==== Stanley Cup contention (2013–2018) ====
On November 11, 2013, going into the day tied for most goals during the regular season, Steven Stamkos suffered a broken right tibia after crashing into one of the goalposts during play against the Boston Bruins. He would miss 45 games and was not cleared to play again until March 5, 2014.

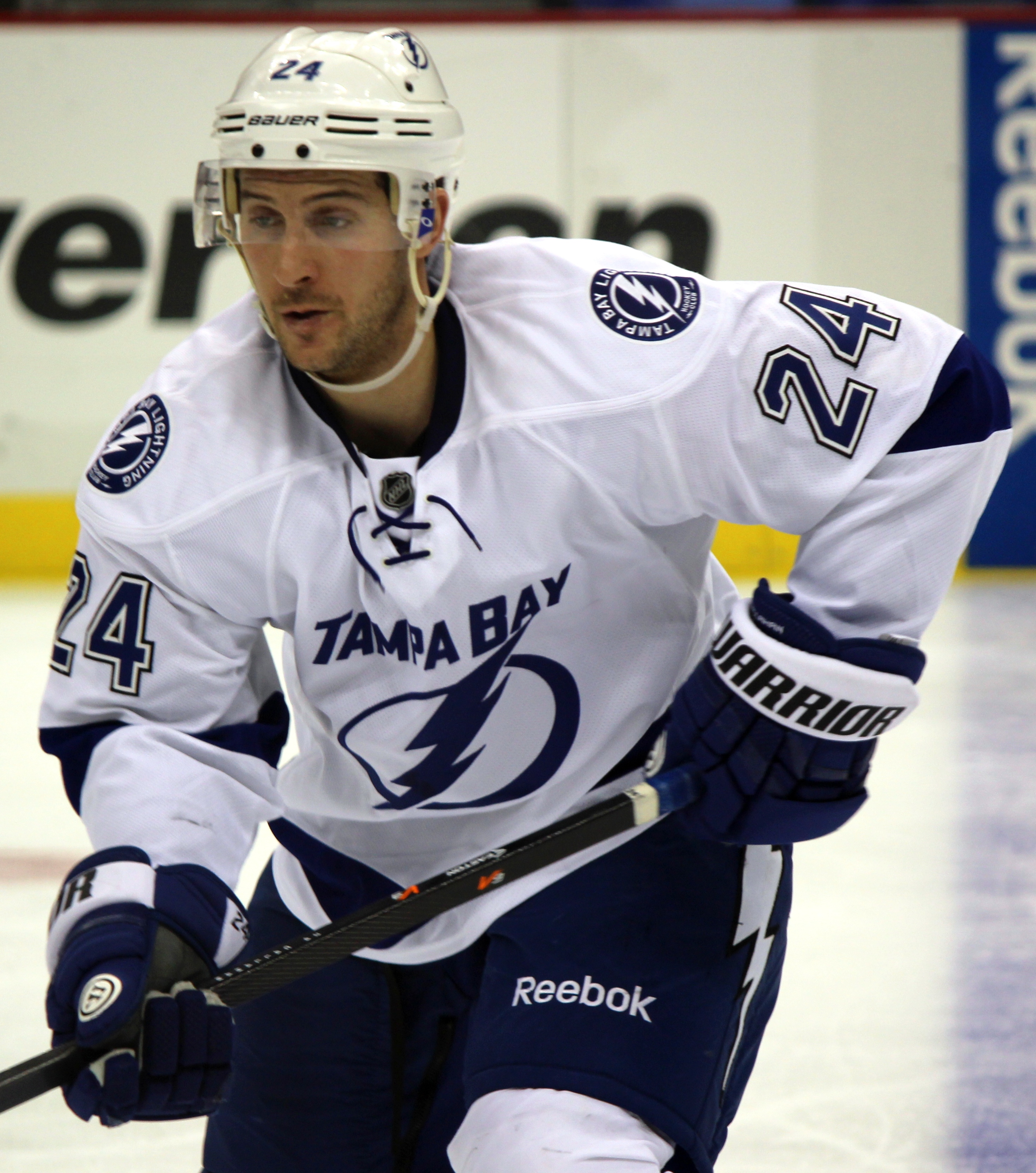
Ryan Callahan during his first month with the Lightning. Callahan was acquired by the team in a trade that sent Martin St. Louis to the New York Rangers.

In January 2014, general manager Steve Yzerman, who also served as the general manager for Canada's team at the 2014 Winter Olympics, elected not to name Lightning captain Martin St. Louis to Canada's roster, instead choosing the still-injured Stamkos. After Stamkos was not medically cleared to play in Sochi in early February, Yzerman ultimately named St. Louis to Team Canada as an injury replacement. In late February, it was reported St. Louis requested a trade from Yzerman the month prior. St. Louis, who had a no-move clause in his contract with Tampa Bay, reportedly consented to only being traded to the New York Rangers. On March 5, 2014, St. Louis was sent to New York along with a conditional 2015 second-round pick in exchange for New York captain Ryan Callahan, a 2015 first-round draft pick, a conditional 2014 second-round pick and a 2015 conditional seventh-round pick. St. Louis cited his decision based on his family and thanked Lightning fans for their support during his tenure with the franchise, but would not specify any further about the reasons leading to his request. On March 6, Steven Stamkos was named Tampa Bay's 10th captain. They qualified for the playoffs, but were eliminated by the Montreal Canadiens in a four-game sweep.

Prior to the 2014–15 season, the Lightning drafted Brayden Point at 79th overall. In the playoffs, they defeated the Detroit Red Wings in the first round, the Montreal Canadiens in the second round, and the New York Rangers in the Eastern Conference final. Their victory against the Rangers came in game seven at Madison Square Garden, the first time any team accomplished this feat against New York. They also became the first team to successfully defeat three Original Six teams in the first three rounds of the playoffs. The Lightning faced the Chicago Blackhawks in the Stanley Cup Final, making it the first time a finalist faced four Original Six teams in the playoffs since the four-round format was introduced in 1980. However, they lost the series in six games.

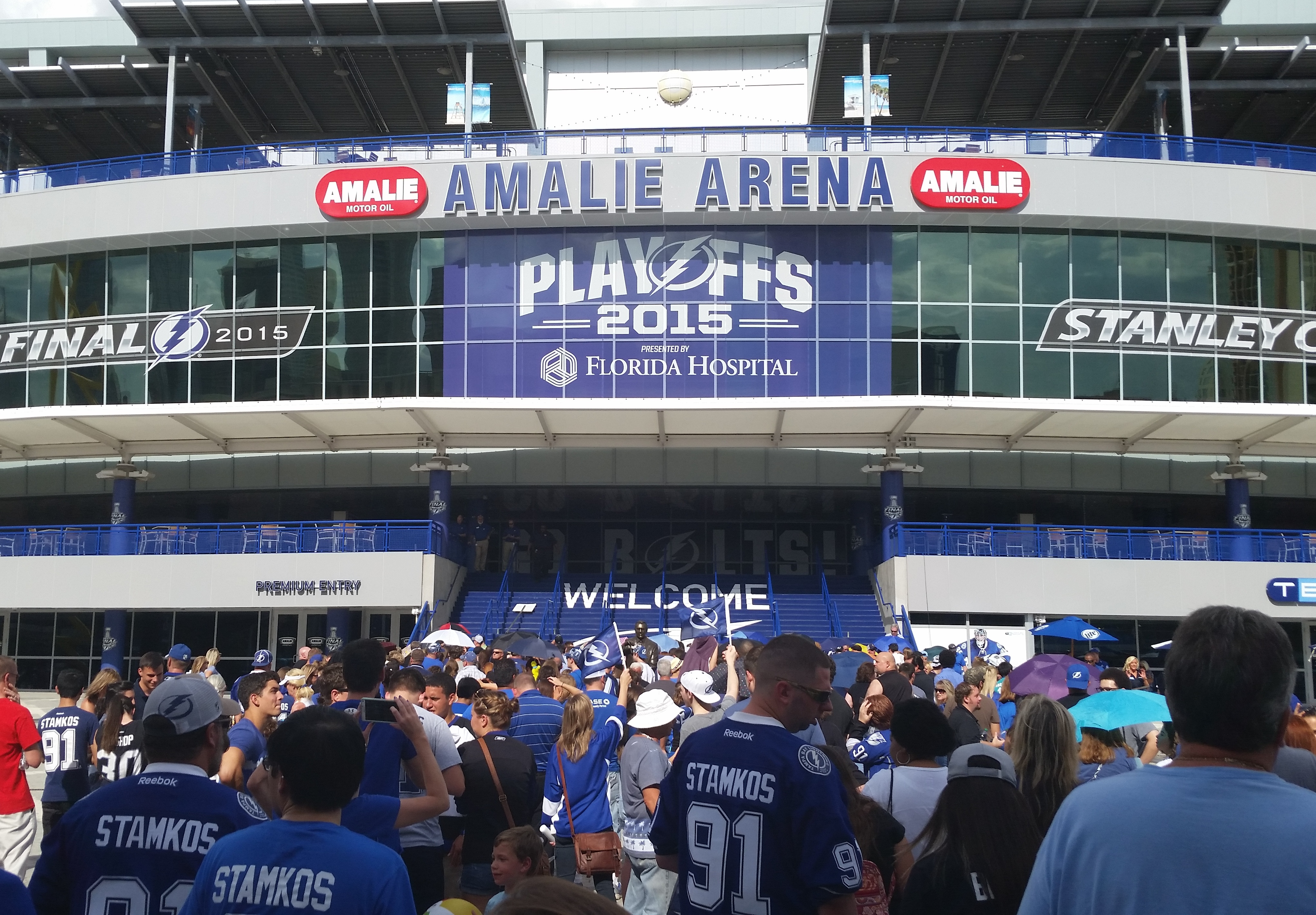
A viewing party outside Amalie Arena for game 6 of the 2015 Stanley Cup Final

The first half of the 2015–16 season was filled with controversy for the team, starting off with the contractual questions regarding captain Steven Stamkos and with the former third overall pick Jonathan Drouin publicly requesting a trade and being suspended from the organization. Stamkos was out of the lineup for the team's game on April 2 against the New Jersey Devils in Tampa; general manager Steve Yzerman announced after the game that the captain would miss one-to-three months due to a blood clot in his arm. Due to the injuries on the team, Drouin rejoined the team. In the first round of the playoffs, for the second consecutive season they defeated the Red Wings. In the second round, they defeated the New York Islanders, but were defeated by the Pittsburgh Penguins in the conference finals in seven games.

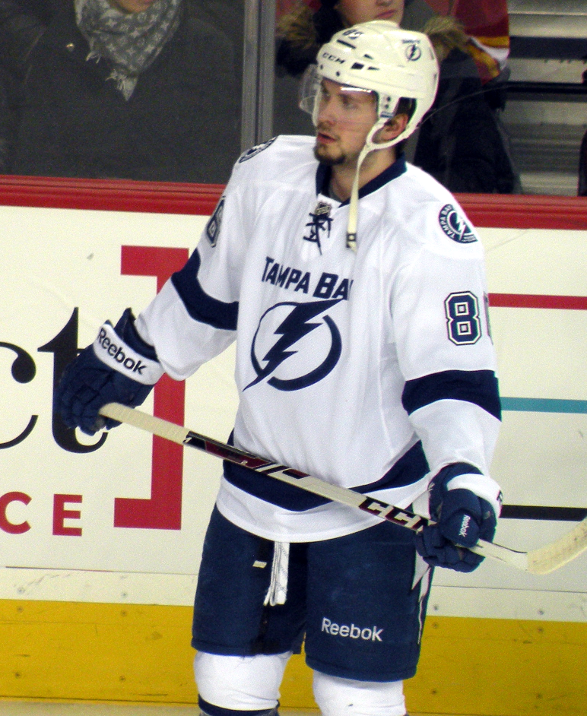
Nikita Kucherov emerged as the Lightning's leading point-scorer during the 2015–16 season.

In the 2016 offseason, Drouin rescinded his trade request and the team re-signed Stamkos to an eight-year deal. The Lightning narrowly missed the playoffs in the 2016–17 season, missing by just one point. The 2016–17 season for the Lightning was a host of injuries, mainly to their captain, Steven Stamkos who suffered a torn left meniscus. Ryan Callahan would also play in only 18 games due to multiple surgeries to his back and hip. Towards the end of the season, they traded goaltender Ben Bishop to the Los Angeles Kings, center Brian Boyle to the Toronto Maple Leafs, and forward Valtteri Filppula to the Philadelphia Flyers.

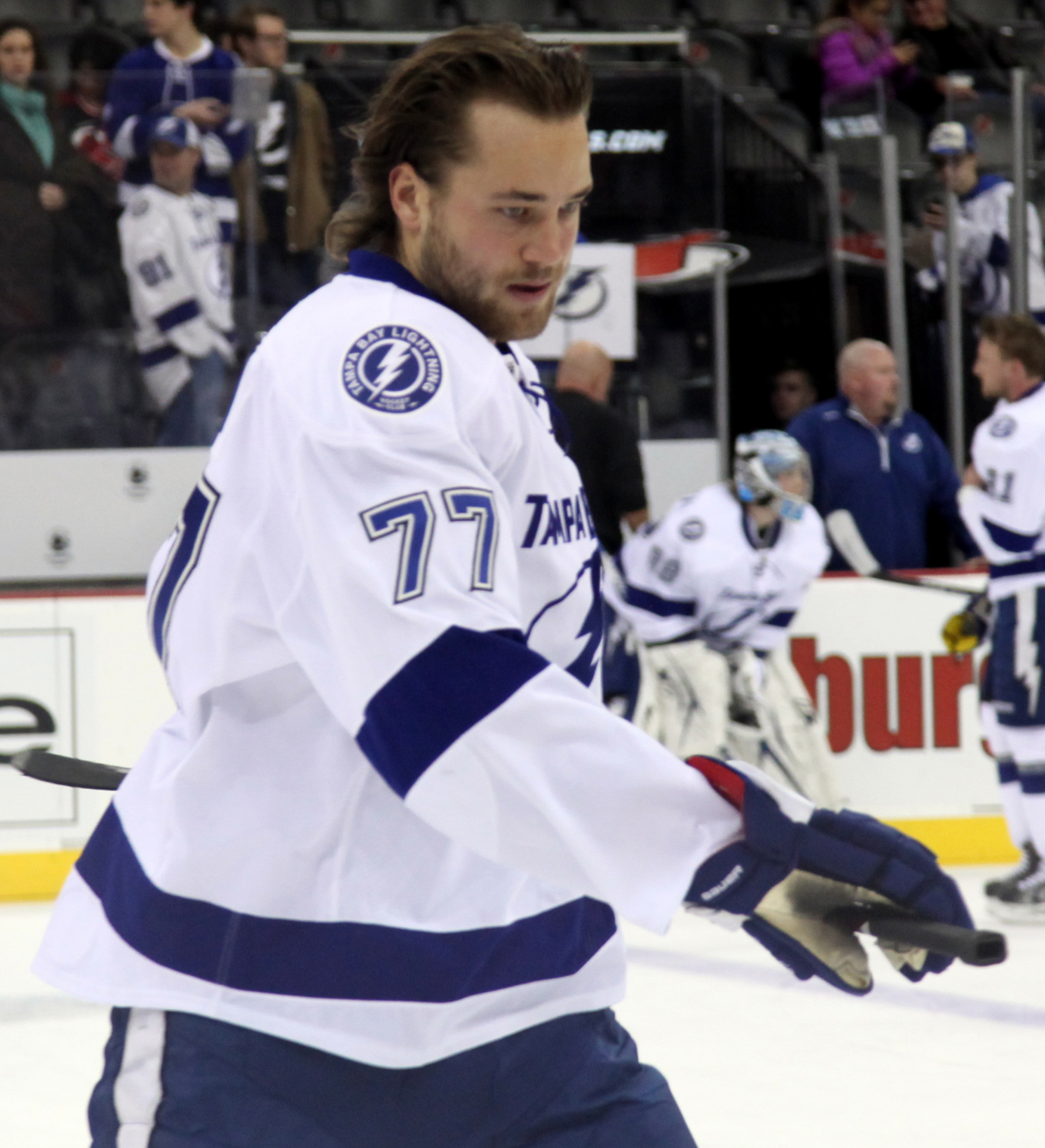
Victor Hedman won the James Norris Memorial Trophy in 2017–18.

In the 2017 offseason, the Lightning traded Drouin to the Montreal Canadiens for defensive prospect Mikhail Sergachev and a second-round pick in the 2018 NHL entry draft. In the 2017–18 season, Steven Stamkos returned from injury, scoring 20 points in the first 10 games and assisting on nine of Nikita Kucherov's 11 goals. The Lightning finished the 2017–18 season with a record of 54–23–5, finishing with 113 points. The Lightning won their first division title since the 2003–04 season, as well as securing the top seed in the Eastern Conference for the 2018 Stanley Cup playoffs. Nikita Kucherov scored 100 points during the regular season, finishing third overall in the league. During the 2018 playoffs, the Lightning eliminated the New Jersey Devils in the first round and the Boston Bruins in the second round, both in five games. However, they were defeated in the conference finals by the Washington Capitals, in seven games.

=== Julien BriseBois era (2018–present) ===
==== First Presidents' Trophy winner swept in the first round (2018–2019) ====
On September 11, 2018, Steve Yzerman resigned from his position as general manager, with assistant general manager Julien BriseBois taking his place. During the 2018–19 season, the Lightning clinched their first Presidents' Trophy and second consecutive division title. Winning their final regular season game against the Boston Bruins on April 6, the Lightning finished with 62 wins, tying the NHL record set by the 1995–96 Detroit Red Wings for most wins in a season. Nikita Kucherov became the second player in Lightning franchise history (after Martin St. Louis) to win the Hart Memorial Trophy as the league's most valuable player and the Art Ross Trophy as the league's leading point scorer, setting a new franchise record of 128 points. Andrei Vasilevskiy became the first player in franchise history to win the Vezina Trophy as the league's best goaltender. However, in the first round of the 2019 playoffs, they were swept in four games by the eighth seeded Columbus Blue Jackets, becoming the first Presidents' Trophy winner to be swept in the first round of the playoffs. The series is widely regarded as one of the biggest upsets in league history. Former NHL player and NBC Sports analyst Jeremy Roenick described Tampa's elimination as "one of the biggest letdowns in history", while the Tampa Bay Times described it as "the disappointment that all others are measured against".

==== Back-to-back Stanley Cups and three straight Final appearances (2019–2022) ====
The Lightning began the 2019–20 season with a 17–13–4 record after 34 games. After this point, they won 23 of their next 26 games, including two separate win streaks of at least ten games, the second of which eventually set a new franchise record of eleven consecutive wins. They lost captain Steven Stamkos to injury once again, as he underwent surgery to repair a core muscle in late February. He was expected to miss 6–8 weeks as a result, which at the time was expected to keep him out for the remainder of the regular season and the start of the playoffs.

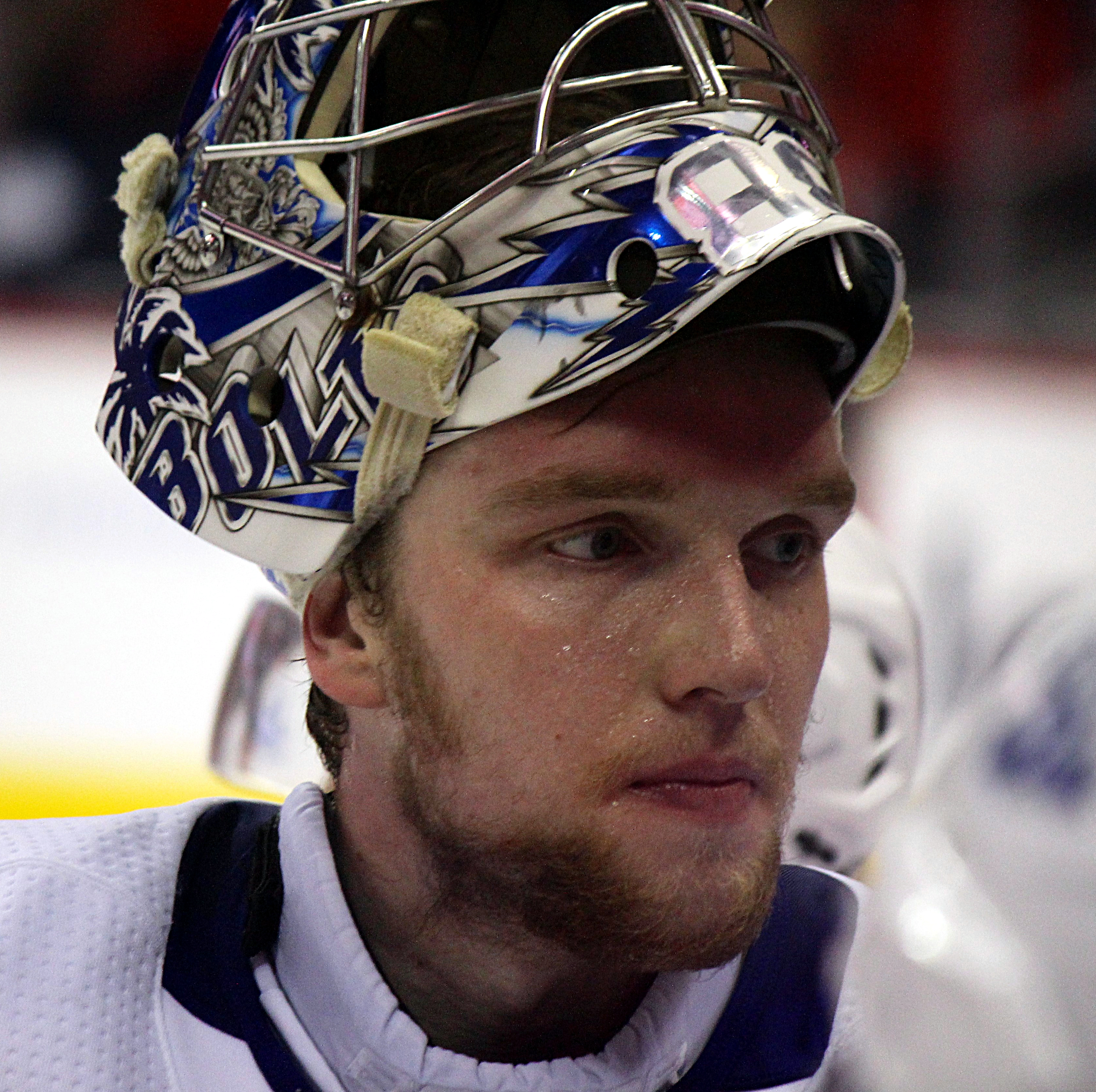
Andrei Vasilevskiy backstopped the Lightning to back-to-back Stanley Cup championships, winning the Conn Smythe Trophy as playoff MVP in 2021.

Tampa Bay had only played 70 games when the NHL suspended the season on March 12, 2020, due to the COVID-19 pandemic. At the time, the Lightning had a record of 43–21–6 and were second in their conference. In the expanded playoffs, the Lightning drew the Columbus Blue Jackets again in the first round. The first game of the series became the fourth-longest NHL game in history, as the game-winning goal was scored by Brayden Point at the 10:27 mark of the fifth overtime period. Point also scored in overtime for a second time in game five, eliminating Columbus. In the second round, the Lightning faced the Presidents' Trophy-winning Boston Bruins. After losing the first game of this series, the Lightning rallied to win the next four, with Victor Hedman's double-overtime goal in game five sealing the series victory for Tampa Bay. In the conference finals, the Lightning took on the New York Islanders, winning in six games. In the 2020 Stanley Cup Final, the Lightning met the Dallas Stars and won in six games to earn their second Stanley Cup championship, and first since 2004. The victory led to a new tradition for Tampa Bay sports teams: boat parades. The 2020 Lightning held a parade of boats on the Hillsborough River rather than a traditional victory parade through the streets of the city, mainly to comply with COVID-19 regulations, but subsequent championship teams in Tampa have held similar parades even with those restrictions lifted.

Due to COVID-19, the league moved the Lightning to the Central Division. Nikita Kucherov missed the entire regular season with a hip surgery he had in December 2020. His surgery cleared up $9.5 million in salary cap space and allowed the team to be cap compliant until the playoffs. Other teams noticed the loophole and used the same technique in later seasons to add or sign players to go up to the salary cap while one player with a higher contract was on long term injured reserve. Entering the 2021 playoffs, the Lightning faced their intra-state rival, the Florida Panthers, for the first time in the playoffs. The Lightning won the series 4–2. In the second round, the Lightning faced the Carolina Hurricanes. In the third game of the series, Brayden Point would score the first goal in a playoff goal-scoring streak that would last for nine games, coming in second to Reggie Leach with 10 games in a single playoff year. The Lightning won the series in five games. For the second consecutive year, the Lightning would again face the New York Islanders in the third round, which Tampa Bay won in seven games. In the Stanley Cup Final, the Lightning defeated the Montreal Canadiens in five games. During the parade celebration, Patrick Maroon slipped and dropped the Stanley Cup, severely denting the trophy's bowl. Maroon cited the strong thunderstorm during the outdoor celebration as the reason, and the Cup was quickly repaired.

On February 26, 2022, the Lightning played their first outdoor game in franchise history against the host Nashville Predators in the 2022 NHL Stadium Series at Nissan Stadium. The Lightning won the game 3–2. In the 2022 playoffs, the Lightning defeated the Toronto Maple Leafs in seven games in the first round and swept their in-state rivals, the Presidents' Trophy–winning Florida Panthers, in the second round. On June 11, the Lightning clinched their third straight Stanley Cup Final berth defeating the New York Rangers in game six of the conference finals. However, in the 2022 Stanley Cup Final, they lost in six games against the Colorado Avalanche.

==== Early playoff exits and Stamkos departure (2022–present) ====
In the 2022–23 season, the Lightning finished in third place in the Atlantic Division and sixth in the Eastern Conference, and once again played the Toronto Maple Leafs in the first round of the 2023 playoffs. However, the Maple Leafs eliminated the Lightning 4–2. In the 2023–24 season, the Lightning finished in fourth place in the Atlantic Division, and qualified for the 2024 playoffs as the first wild card, but were eliminated by their in–state rivals, the Florida Panthers, in five games in the first round.

In the 2024 offseason, captain Steven Stamkos signed with the Nashville Predators on the first day of free agency after Stamkos and the team were unable to come up with a contract extension agreement prior to start of free agency. They named Victor Hedman as the next captain. In the 2024–25 season, they played the Florida Panthers in the first round of the playoffs and lost in five games. The 2025–26 season ended with another first round playoff loss, this time against the Montreal Canadiens in seven games.

== Team colors and mascot ==
Since their 2011 rebrand, the Lightning’s primary colors have been blue and white, with black used as a trim and alternate-uniform color. Their logo has been a stylized lightning bolt. This is the origin of one nickname for the team—the "Bolts".

=== Logo and jerseys ===
The primary (left) and alternate logos (right) used by the team from 1992 to 2007. The team was named the Lightning in reference to the Tampa Bay Area being the "lightning capital of North America".

The original Lightning jerseys featured simple stripes on the sleeves and tail, and contrasting shoulders—black shoulders over a white jersey, and white shoulders over the black—with the alternate logo (a lightning bolt over the outline of the state of Florida). The underarm gussets included a feature referred to as "victory stripes"—a group of thin stripes, alternating in the team's colors (black-silver-blue on white, or white-blue-silver on black). For the 1996–97 season, the Lightning added a third jersey, primarily blue with a sublimated wave and rain design on the front and back, lightning bolts down the sleeves, a silver-gray shoulder yoke, and black gussets. The third jersey was retired after the 1998–99 season.

In 2007 the Lightning adopted a new primary logo, which was used until 2011.

As with all NHL teams for the 2007–08 season, the Lightning debuted in new Reebok "Rbk Edge" jerseys. The Lightning unveiled their new logo on August 25, 2007. The logo was similar to the inaugural one, but with a more modern look. The new logo also kept the same theme as the previous one, but with the words "Tampa Bay" across the top now appearing with tall capital initials, and the word "Lightning" no longer appearing on the bottom of the logo. Unlike those teams, the Lightning's elbow panels remain the base color of the jersey, and an additional blue panel is added near the cuff of the sleeve. The Edge uniforms retain the underarm gusset "victory stripes" of their predecessors.

The Lightning then debuted a new "alternate" or "third" jersey in the 2008–09 season. The jersey features a dominant "electric blue" color, with black and silver accents at the end of the sleeves. The logo is removed, and in its place emblazoned across the front of the jersey descending to the lower left of the jersey is the word "BOLTS" (utilizing a layout similar to that of the Ottawa Senators' third jersey). The numbers are featured on the back and sleeves only, using white lettering.

It was reported on January 23, 2011, that the Lightning had filed paperwork with the NHL to change their logo and colors, beginning with the 2011–12 season. The new logo, as well as the new home and away jerseys, were unveiled by the team at a press conference at the St. Pete Times Forum on January 31, 2011. The Lightning began to integrate the new logo onto center ice, and even distributed free T-shirts with the simplified logo on February 4, 2011, while still using the old Lightning logo and uniforms.

The current uniforms are made in a traditional hockey sweater design. Initially, the colors that were to be used were simply blue and white, but by popular demand, black was later added as a trim color on the numbers. The victory stripes were also eliminated. Despite the introduction of the new uniforms, the previous third jersey was retained, with the new simplified logo replacing the old logo in the shoulders prior to the 2012–13 season.

The Lightning made some minor tweaks to their current uniform set following the NHL's move to Adidas as its uniform provider in the 2017–18 season. The most notable change is the removal of the "TAMPA BAY" wordmark on the white away sweaters.

On February 7, 2019, the Lightning unveiled a new black uniform, lacking any blue and white elements and featuring sublimated black and grey patterns on the sleeves, socks and back numbers.

For the 2020–21 season, the Lightning released a "Reverse Retro" uniform, using the design they wore from 2001 to 2007. Unlike the originals, blue served as the base color while black was relegated to trim color. Their 2022–23 "Reverse Retro" uniform used the design of the third jersey from 1996 to 1999, but with a white base.

For the 2022 NHL Stadium Series, the Lightning unveiled a white uniform with a stylized blue stripe shaped like a thunderbolt at the bottom. An updated rendition of the "BOLTS" wordmark was stitched in front, and numbers featured pointed accents.

In the 2023–24 season, the Lightning unveiled a new black alternate uniform, putting the roundel logo as the main crest and bringing back the "victory stripes" on the sleeves. The white numbers with black trim and blue drop shadows were heavily inspired by the team's first uniforms.

During the 2026 NHL Stadium Series, the Lightning wore blue uniforms with sky blue accents and sublimated lightning marks. The crest featured the "TBL" abbreviation arranged diagonally, using the same font they sported on the 2022 Stadium Series uniforms. Pirate-related references, alluding to the Gasparilla Pirate Festival and fact that the game was played at the Tampa Bay Buccaneers' home base of Raymond James Stadium, were featured on the sleeves and circular patch.

=== In-game personalities ===
Greg Wolf has been the Lightning's in-game host since the 2006–07 season.

Retired United States Air Force Technical Sergeant Sonya Bryson-Kirksey sings the Canadian and American national anthems at most home games. She started singing the US national anthem for the team in 2013, and the Canadian anthem in 2020 and is accompanied by organist, Krystof Srebrakowski.

=== ThunderBug ===
The Lightning mascot is a lightning bug named ThunderBug, who performs at games and makes appearances in the community.

=== Lightning Girls ===
Until the 2019–20 season, an official dance team known as the Lightning Girls performed at all home games and community events. The Tampa Bay Lightning Girls were a group of dancers who performed in the stands.

== Season-by-season record ==
This is a partial list of the last five seasons completed by the Lightning. For the full season-by-season history, see List of Tampa Bay Lightning seasons.

Note: GP = Games played, W = Wins, L = Losses, T = Ties, OTL = Overtime Losses, Pts = Points, GF = Goals for, GA = Goals against

Season	GP	W	L	OTL	Pts	GF	GA	Finish	Playoffs
2021–22	82	51	23	8	110	287	233	3rd, Atlantic	Lost in Stanley Cup Final, 2–4 (Avalanche)
2022–23	82	46	30	6	98	283	254	3rd, Atlantic	Lost in first round, 2–4 (Maple Leafs)
2023–24	82	45	29	8	98	291	268	4th, Atlantic	Lost in first round, 1–4 (Panthers)
2024–25	82	47	27	8	102	294	219	2nd, Atlantic	Lost in first round, 1–4 (Panthers)
2025–26	82	50	26	6	106	290	231	2nd, Atlantic	Lost in first round, 3–4 (Canadiens)

== Players and personnel ==
=== Current roster ===
Updated November 20, 2026

No.	Nat	Player	Pos	S/G	Age	Acquired	Birthplace
74	(United States)	John Carlson	D	R	36	2026	Natick, Massachusetts
81	(Slovakia)	Erik Černák	D	R	29	2017	Košice, Slovakia
71	(Canada)	Anthony Cirelli	C	L	29	2015	Woodbridge, Ontario
24	(Canada)	Max Crozier	D	R	26	2019	North Vancouver, British Columbia
51	(Canada)	Charle-Edouard D'Astous	D	L	28	2025	Rimouski, Quebec
94	(Canada)	Conor Geekie	C	L	22	2024	Minnedosa, Manitoba
28	(Latvia)	Zemgus Girgensons	LW	L	32	2024	Riga, Latvia
93	(Canada)	Gage Goncalves	C	R	25	2020	Mission, British Columbia
37	(Canada)	Yanni Gourde	C	L	34	2025	Saint-Narcisse, Quebec
59	(United States)	Jake Guentzel	LW	L	32	2024	Omaha, Nebraska
38	(Canada)	Brandon Hagel	LW	L	28	2022	Saskatoon, Saskatchewan
10	(Canada)	Jansen Harkins	C	L	29	2026	Cleveland, Ohio
77	(Sweden)	Victor Hedman (C)	D	L	35	2009	Örnsköldsvik, Sweden
35	(Sweden)	Dennis Hildeby	G	L	25	2026	Järfälla, Sweden
29	(Sweden)	Pontus Holmberg	RW	L	27	2025	Västerås, Sweden
17	(United States)	Dominic James	C	L	24	2025	Plymouth, Michigan
86	(Russia)	Nikita Kucherov (A)	RW	L	33	2011	Maykop, Russia
78	(Norway)	Emil Lilleberg	D	L	25	2023	Sarpsborg, Norway
27	(United States)	Ryan McDonagh (A)	D	L	37	2024	Saint Paul, Minnesota
95	(Russia)	Ilya Mikheyev	RW	L	32	2026	Omsk, Russia
90	(Switzerland)	J. J. Moser	D	L	26	2024	Biel, Switzerland
21	(Canada)	Brayden Point	C	R	30	2014	Calgary, Alberta
49	(Canada)	Scott Sabourin	RW	R	34	2025	Orleans, Ontario
88	(Russia)	Andrei Vasilevskiy	G	L	32	2012	Tyumen, Russia
25	(Canada)	Jeffrey Viel	LW	L	29	2026	Rimouski, Quebec

=== Retired numbers ===
Tampa Bay Lightning retired numbers
No.	Player	Position	Career	Date of retirement
4	Vincent Lecavalier	C	1998–2013	February 10, 2018
26	Martin St. Louis	RW	2000–2014	January 13, 2017

- The NHL retired Wayne Gretzky's No. 99 for all its member teams at the 2000 NHL All-Star Game.

=== Team captains ===
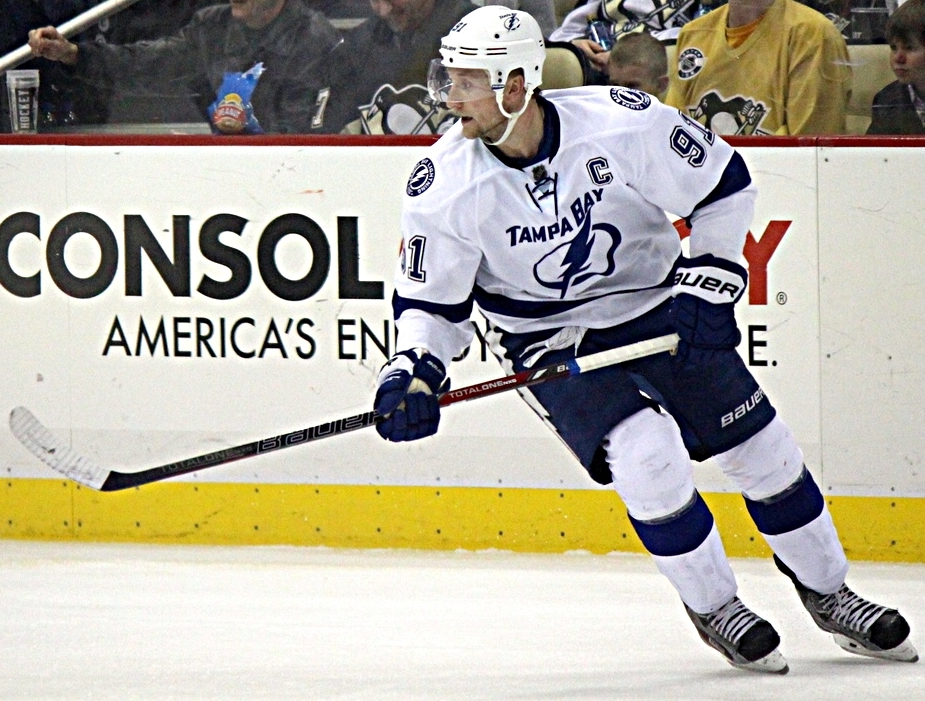
Named to the position in 2014, Steven Stamkos was the longest tenured captain of the Lightning.

- Paul Ysebaert, 1995–1997
- Mikael Renberg, 1997–1998
- Rob Zamuner, 1998–1999
- Bill Houlder, 1999
- Chris Gratton, 1999–2000
- Vincent Lecavalier, 2000–2001
- Dave Andreychuk, 2002–2006
- Tim Taylor, 2006–2008
- Vincent Lecavalier, 2008–2013
- Martin St. Louis, 2013–2014
- Steven Stamkos, 2014–2024
- Victor Hedman, 2024–present

=== Hockey Hall of Fame ===
- Dave Andreychuk
- Dino Ciccarelli
- Mark Recchi
- Denis Savard
- Martin St. Louis

=== Honored members ===
First NHL All-Star team

- 2003–04 – Martin St. Louis
- 2017–18 – Victor Hedman, Nikita Kucherov
- 2018–19 – Nikita Kucherov, Andrei Vasilevskiy
- 2020–21 – Andrei Vasilevskiy
- 2023–24 – Nikita Kucherov
- 2024–25 – Nikita Kucherov
- 2025–26 – Nikita Kucherov, Andrei Vasilevskiy

Second NHL All-Star team

- 2006–07 – Martin St. Louis, Vincent Lecavalier, Dan Boyle
- 2009–10 – Martin St. Louis
- 2010–11 – Martin St. Louis, Steven Stamkos
- 2011–12 – Steven Stamkos
- 2012–13 – Martin St. Louis
- 2015–16 – Ben Bishop
- 2016–17 – Victor Hedman, Nikita Kucherov
- 2018–19 – Victor Hedman
- 2019–20 – Victor Hedman, Nikita Kucherov
- 2020–21 – Victor Hedman
- 2021–22 – Victor Hedman
- 2024–25 – Brandon Hagel, Victor Hedman, Andrei Vasilevskiy

NHL All-Rookie Team

- Brad Richards: 2000–01
- Tyler Johnson: 2013–14
- Ondřej Palát: 2013–14
- Anthony Cirelli: 2018–19

All-Star Game

- Ben Bishop, G: 2016
- Brian Bradley, C: 1993, 1994
- Dino Ciccarelli, RW: 1997
- Wendel Clark, LW: 1999
- Jon Cooper, HC: 2018, 2019
- Roman Hamrlík, D: 1996
- Victor Hedman, D: 2017, 2018, 2020, 2022
- Tyler Johnson, C: 2015
- Nikolai Khabibulin, G: 2002, 2003
- Pavel Kubina, D: 2004
- Nikita Kucherov, RW: 2017, 2018, 2019, 2023, 2024
- Vincent Lecavalier, C: 2003, 2007, 2008 (captain), 2009
- Fredrik Modin, LW: 2001
- Brayden Point, C: 2018
- Martin St. Louis, RW: 2003, 2004, 2007, 2008, 2009, 2011 (alternate captain)
- Steven Stamkos, C: 2011, 2012, 2015, 2016, 2018 (captain), 2019, 2022
- Petr Svoboda, D: 2000
- Andrei Vasilevskiy, G: 2018, 2019, 2020, 2022, 2023

NHL YoungStars Game

- Brad Richards, C: 2002
- Alexander Svitov, C: 2003
- Paul Ranger, D: 2007
- Mike Lundin, D: 2008
- Steven Stamkos, C: 2009

NHL All-Star Skills Competition (Rookie)

- Jonathan Drouin, LW: 2015

=== Tampa Bay Lightning Hall of Fame ===
Elected to the Hockey Hall of Fame

Tampa Bay Lightning Hall of Fame
No.	Name	Position	Career	Inducted
–	Phil Esposito (Note: Phil Esposito was inducted into the Hockey Hall of Fame in 1984 for his playing career, not for his contributions with the Tampa Bay Lightning.)	Founder/Broadcaster	1992–present	2023
4	Vincent Lecavalier	C	1998–2013	2023
26	Martin St. Louis	RW	2000–2014	2023
25	Dave Andreychuk	LW	2001–2006	2024
19	Brad Richards	C	2000–2008	2024
19	Brian Bradley	C	1992–1998	2025
–	Rick Peckham	Broadcaster	1995–2020	2025

=== First-round draft picks ===
- 1992: Roman Hamrlik (1st overall)
- 1993: Chris Gratton (3rd overall)
- 1994: Jason Wiemer (8th overall)
- 1995: Daymond Langkow (5th overall)
- 1996: Mario Larocque (16th overall)
- 1997: Paul Mara (7th overall)
- 1998: Vincent Lecavalier (1st overall)
- 2000: Nikita Alexeev (8th overall)
- 2001: Alexander Svitov (3rd overall)
- 2004: Andy Rogers (30th overall)
- 2005: Vladimir Mihalik (30th overall)
- 2006: Riku Helenius (15th overall)
- 2008: Steven Stamkos (1st overall)
- 2009: Victor Hedman (2nd overall), Carter Ashton (29th overall)
- 2010: Brett Connolly (6th overall)
- 2011: Vladislav Namestnikov (27th overall)
- 2012: Slater Koekkoek (10th overall), Andrei Vasilevskiy (19th overall)
- 2013: Jonathan Drouin (3rd overall)
- 2014: Anthony DeAngelo (19th overall)
- 2016: Brett Howden (27th overall)
- 2017: Cal Foote (14th overall)
- 2019: Nolan Foote (27th overall)
- 2022: Isaac Howard (31st overall)

== Awards and trophies ==
Stanley Cup

- 2003–04, 2019–20, 2020–21

Presidents' Trophy

- 2018–19

Prince of Wales Trophy

- 2003–04, 2014–15, 2019–20, 2020–21, 2021–22

Art Ross Trophy

- Martin St. Louis: 2003–04, 2012–13
- Nikita Kucherov: 2018–19, 2023–24, 2024–25

Bill Masterton Memorial Trophy

- John Cullen: 1998–99

Conn Smythe Trophy

- Brad Richards: 2003–04
- Victor Hedman: 2019–20
- Andrei Vasilevskiy: 2020–21

Foster Hewitt Memorial Award

- Rick Peckham: 2020

Hart Memorial Trophy

- Martin St. Louis: 2003–04
- Nikita Kucherov: 2018–19, 2025–26

Jack Adams Award

- John Tortorella: 2003–04
- Jon Cooper: 2025–26

James Norris Memorial Trophy

- Victor Hedman: 2017–18

King Clancy Memorial Trophy

- Vincent Lecavalier: 2007–08

Lady Byng Memorial Trophy

- Brad Richards: 2003–04
- Martin St. Louis: 2009–10, 2010–11, 2012–13

Lester B. Pearson Award/Ted Lindsay Award

- Martin St. Louis: 2003–04
- Nikita Kucherov: 2018–19, 2024–25

Mark Messier Leadership Award

- Steven Stamkos: 2022–23

Maurice "Rocket" Richard Trophy

- Vincent Lecavalier: 2006–07
- Steven Stamkos: 2009–10, 2011–12

NHL Foundation Player Award

- Vincent Lecavalier: 2007–08

Jim Gregory General Manager of the Year Award

- Steve Yzerman: 2014–15

NHL Plus/Minus Award

- Martin St. Louis: 2003–04

Vezina Trophy

- Andrei Vasilevskiy: 2018–19, 2025–26

== Franchise leaders ==
=== Scoring leaders ===
These are the top-ten point-scorers in franchise history. Figures are updated after each completed NHL regular season.

- * – current Lightning player

Note: Pos = Position; GP = Games Played; G = Goals; A = Assists; Pts = Points; P/G = Points per game

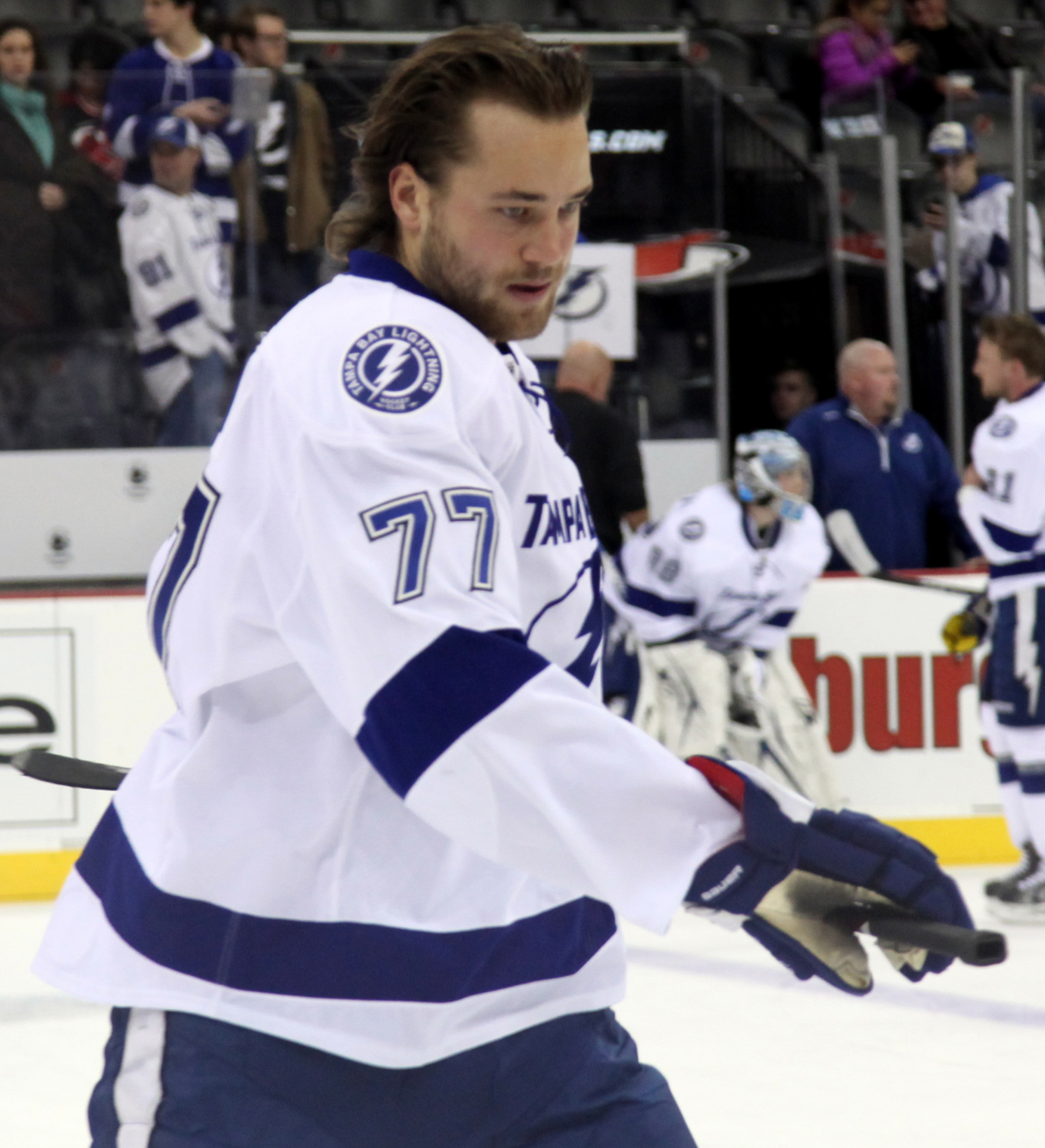
Recording 811 points with the Lightning, Victor Hedman is the Lightning's all-time leading scorer amongst defensemen.

Points
Player	Pos	GP	G	A	Pts	P/G
Steven Stamkos	C	1,082	555	582	1,137	1.05
Nikita Kucherov*	RW	879	401	723	1,124	1.27
Martin St. Louis	RW	972	365	588	953	.98
Vincent Lecavalier	C	1,037	383	491	874	.84
Victor Hedman*	D	1,164	172	639	811	.69
Brayden Point*	C	720	324	361	685	.95
Brad Richards	C	552	150	339	489	.89
Alex Killorn	LW	805	198	268	466	.58
Ondřej Palát	LW	628	143	280	423	.67
Václav Prospal	C	468	127	244	371	.79

Goals
Player	Pos	G
Steven Stamkos	C	555
Nikita Kucherov*	RW	401
Vincent Lecavalier	C	383
Martin St. Louis	RW	365
Brayden Point*	C	324
Alex Killorn	LW	198
Victor Hedman*	D	172
Tyler Johnson	C	161
Brad Richards	C	150
Anthony Cirelli	LW	147

Assists
Player	Pos	A
Nikita Kucherov*	RW	723
Victor Hedman*	D	639
Martin St. Louis	RW	588
Steven Stamkos	C	582
Vincent Lecavalier	C	491
Brayden Point*	C	361
Brad Richards	C	339
Ondřej Palát	LW	280
Alex Killorn	LW	268
Václav Prospal	C	244

=== Goaltending leaders ===
These goaltenders rank in the top ten in franchise history for wins. Figures are updated after each completed NHL season.

- * – current Lightning player

Note: GP = Games played; W = Wins; L = Losses; T/O = Ties/Overtime losses; GA = Goal against; GAA = Goals against average; SA = Shots against; SV% = Save percentage; SO = Shutouts

Goaltenders
Player	GP	W	L	T/O	GA	GAA	SA	SV%	SO
Andrei Vasilevskiy*	598	370	178	39	1,467	2.50	17,590	.917	42
Ben Bishop	227	131	64	20	494	2.28	6,222	.921	17
Nikolai Khabibulin	192	83	74	28	442	2.39	5,157	.914	14
Daren Puppa	206	77	91	26	518	2.68	5,477	.905	12
John Grahame	103	53	36	6	253	2.64	2,538	.900	8
Johan Holmqvist	93	47	31	9	245	2.93	2,263	.892	3
Mike Smith	118	43	52	17	319	2.85	3,361	.905	6
Jonas Johansson	70	32	23	10	219	3.28	1,976	.889	3
Dwayne Roloson	74	31	28	7	213	3.12	2,093	.898	5
Louis Domingue	38	28	8	1	108	2.88	1,196	.910	0

== Franchise records ==
=== Individual records ===
- Most goals in a season: Steven Stamkos, 60 (2011–12)
- Most assists in a season: Nikita Kucherov, 100 (2023–24)
- Most points in a season: Nikita Kucherov, 144 (2023–24)
- Most goals in a season, defenseman: Darren Raddysh (2025–26) 21
- Most assists in a season, defenseman: Victor Hedman, 65 (2021–22)
- Most points in a season, defenseman: Victor Hedman, 85 (2021–22)
- Most penalty minutes in a season: Zenon Konopka, 265 (2009–10)
- Most goals in a season, rookie: Yanni Gourde, 25 (2017–18)
- Most assists in a season, rookie: Brad Richards, 41 (2000–01)
- Most points in a season, rookie: Yanni Gourde, 64 (2017–18)
- Most wins in a season: Andrei Vasilevskiy, 44 (2017–18)
- Most shutouts in a season: Andrei Vasilevskiy, 8 (2017–18)

=== Team records ===
- Largest home playoff attendance: 28,183 (ThunderDome – now Tropicana Field) (1995–96)
- Largest home regular season attendance: 27,227 (ThunderDome) (1993–94)
- Most points in a season: 128 (2018–19)
- Most wins in a season: 62 (2018–19)
- Most home wins in a season: 32 (2014–15 and 2018–19)
- Most road wins in a season: 30 (2018–19)
- Most wins in a row: 11 (2019–20)

== Radio and television ==
The Lightning's flagship radio outlet is WHPT, which replaced WFLA as of the 2022–23 NHL season. Dave Mishkin serves as radio play-by-play announcer, joined by Phil Esposito as color commentator for home games. Greg Lenelli is the pregame and intermission host. From 1995 to 2020, the television play-by-play announcer was Rick Peckham. He announced that his retirement following the 2019–20 season. His final game for the Lightning was game five of their first round series during the 2020 Stanley Cup playoffs. Dave Randorf was named as his replacement prior to the 2020–21 season. The color commentator is Brian Engblom. The studio host is Paul Kennedy. Caley Chelios, daughter of Hall of Fame defenseman Chris Chelios, was the in-arena host and Lightning reporter for five seasons. Former Lightning player Dave Andreychuk and former color commentator Bobby Taylor assist with the television pregame and postgame broadcasts.

On December 10, 2014, long-time color commentator Bobby Taylor announced his retirement from the broadcast booth at the end of the 2014–15 season. Taylor had served as the team's color commentator since the 1993–94 season, which was the team's second year of existence. Taylor cited that he desired to be home with his wife Jan more. Taylor said, "The road was starting to get a little stale," and "I've been traveling since I was 15, and that's a long time." However, Taylor announced that he was not completely stepping away from the team broadcasts. He has continued to serve as a studio analyst. On August 11, 2015, Fox Sports Sun, the regional television home of the Lightning, announced Brian Engblom as Taylor's replacement on color commentary for the 2015–16 season.

The team was previously broadcast by FanDuel Sports Network Sun. On May 14, 2025, after Main Street Sports Group invoked an exit clause in its contract, it was announced that Scripps Sports had acquired the regional rights to the Lightning, with games to be carried over the air on WXPX.

== See also ==
- List of Stanley Cup champions
- List of NHL awards

== Notes ==
Preceded by New Jersey Devils	Stanley Cup champions 2003–04	Succeeded by Carolina Hurricanes (2005–06)
Preceded by St. Louis Blues	Stanley Cup champions 2019–20, 2020–21	Succeeded by Colorado Avalanche
