= Sukeľ =

Sukeľ is a surname. Notable people with the surname include:

- Jakub Sukeľ (born 1996), Slovak ice hockey player
- Matúš Sukeľ (born 1996), Slovak ice hockey player
