= 2020–21 Tampa Bay Lightning season =

Season of play of professional ice hockey team

2020–21 Tampa Bay Lightning
- Stanley Cup champions
- Division: 3rd Central
- 2020–21 record: 36–17–3
- Home record: 21–7–0
- Road record: 15–10–3
- Goals for: 181
- Goals against: 147

Team information
- General manager: Julien BriseBois
- Coach: Jon Cooper
- Captain: Steven Stamkos
- Alternate captains: Victor Hedman; Alex Killorn; Ryan McDonagh
- Arena: Amalie Arena
- Minor league affiliates: Syracuse Crunch (AHL); Orlando Solar Bears (ECHL)

Team leaders
- Goals: Brayden Point (23)
- Assists: Victor Hedman (36)
- Points: Brayden Point (48)
- Penalty minutes: Patrick Maroon (60)
- Plus/minus: Barclay Goodrow (+16)
- Wins: Andrei Vasilevskiy (31)
- Goals against average: Andrei Vasilevskiy (2.21)

The 2020–21 Tampa Bay Lightning season was the 29th season for the National Hockey League (NHL) franchise that was established on December 16, 1991. The Lightning entered the season as the defending Stanley Cup champions. In a joint announcement from the NHL and NHLPA on October 6, 2020, a target date of January 1, 2021 was set for the start of the season. It was reported December 18, 2020 that the two parties had tentatively agreed to a 56-game season scheduled to begin on January 13, 2021.

Because the COVID-19 pandemic was still ongoing prior to the season, as part of the league's return to play protocols, the divisions were realigned and the Lightning were put into the Central Division. This new configuration retained Chicago, Dallas, and Nashville, while it added Detroit and Florida from the Atlantic Division, as well as Carolina and Columbus from the Metropolitan Division. The regular season schedule was announced on December 23, 2020. Opponents in each game during the regular season and potentially the first two rounds of the playoffs are from within the new division.

The Lightning entered the 2021 Stanley Cup playoffs as the defending Stanley Cup champions and the third seed in the Central Division. In the first round, the Lightning defeated their in-state rival the Florida Panthers in six games. They went on to defeat the Carolina Hurricanes in five games to earn a spot in the Semifinals, where they defeated the New York Islanders in seven games to reach the Stanley Cup Final for the second consecutive season. Tampa Bay would then repeat as champions in five games against the Montreal Canadiens. On July 7, 2021, the Lightning became the Stanley Cup Champions for the third time.

== Off-season ==
=== September ===
The Lightning's off-season began after the team captured its second Stanley Cup in franchise history in a 4–2 series win over the Dallas Stars.

=== October ===
On October 7, 2020, the Lightning re-signed forwards Mitchell Stephens and Gemel Smith to contract extensions. Stepehens was signed to a two-year extension after being part of the 2020 Stanley Cup championship roster. Smith signed a one-year deal after appearing in three regular season games for the Lightning and spending the majority of the season with the Lightning's American Hockey League (AHL) affiliate, the Syracuse Crunch.

At the 2020 NHL entry draft, the Lightning selected Jack Finley, Gage Goncalves, Maxim Groshev, Jack Thompson, Eamon Powell, Jaydon Dureau, Nick Capone, Amir Miftakhov and Declan McDonnell. Later in the evening, the Lightning announced that it had issued qualifying offers to Anthony Cirelli, Erik Cernak, Ross Colton, Mathieu Joseph, Dominik Masin, Mikhail Sergachev, Ben Thomas and Alex Volkov. The team did not issue qualifying offers to Devante Stephens, Carter Verhaeghe and Dennis Yan.

On October 9, 2020, the Lightning placed Tyler Johnson on waivers after being unable to trade him prior to free agency. Johnson has a $5 million cap hit with four years remaining on his current contract with the Lightning. Johnson cleared waivers the following day after going unclaimed by another team.

That same day, the Lightning announced that it had signed forward Patrick Maroon to a two-year contract extension. Maroon skated in all of the Lightning's playoff games on their way to winning their second Stanley Cup in franchise history.

Around the same time, the Lightning re-signed defenseman Luke Schenn to a one-year contract extension. Scheen appeared in 25 regular season games and 11 playoff games during the Lightning's championship run the prior season. Schenn's contract counted for $800,000 against the salary cap.

The Lightning also made a series of depth signings that day. The Lightning signed defenseman Andreas Borgman and goaltender and Christopher Gibson. The Lightning also re-signed Spencer Martin to a one-year contract extension. Martin had spent the previous season with the Syracuse Crunch in the AHL. Borgman played in 53 games this past season for the AHL's San Antonio Rampage. Gibson appeared in net in 25 games for the AHL's Bridgeport Sound Tigers during the prior season.

On October 12, 2020, the Lightning announced the re-signing of defensemen prospect Ben Thomas. Thomas had been playing for the Syracuse Crunch for the past four seasons, during which time he appeared in over 200 career games. Thomas was originally drafted by Lightning in the fourth round of the 2014 NHL entry draft.

On October 14, 2020, the Lightning announced that it had re-signed forward prospect Ross Colton. Colton had spent the last two years playing for the AHL's Syracuse Crunch. Colton was drafted by the Lightning in the fourth round of the 2016 NHL entry draft.

On October 23, 2020, it was announced that assistant coach Todd Richards was leaving the Lightning to take an assistant coaching job with the Nashville Predators. Richards spent the past four seasons with the Lightning and helped the team capture its second Stanley Cup.

=== November ===
On November 25, 2020, the Lightning announced the re-signing of defenseman Mikhail Sergachev to a three-year contract extension. The contract carried a $4.8 million cap hit. Since coming over to the Lightning via trade, Sergachev produced three straight seasons of more than 30 points and helped the franchise to its second Stanley Cup.

=== December ===
On December 7, 2020, the Lightning announced the hiring of assistant coach Rob Zettler. Zettler was previously an assistant of Lightning head coach Jon Cooper when he was the head coach of the AHL's Syracuse Crunch. Zettler took over as head coach of the Crunch after Cooper was promoted to be the Lightning's head coach. Zettler was released by the team after three seasons. Zettler went on to spend two seasons as an assistant coach with the San Jose Sharks and a season of prospect coaching for Adam Oates and the Oates Sports Group. Zettler filled the vacancy left by the departure of Todd Richards. Richards worked with the Lightning defensemen and handled the team's penalty kill.

On December 12, 2020, the Lightning announced the signing of 2020 NHL draft pick Jack Finley. Finley spent the past three seasons with the Spokane Chiefs of the Western Hockey League (WHL), where he has skated in 131 career WHL games and recorded 28 goals and 77 points.

On December 13, 2020, the Lightning announced the signing of another 2020 NHL draft pick, center Gage Goncalves, to a three-year entry-level contract. Goncalves was previously an undrafted camp invite by the WHL's Everett Silvertips before being drafted by the Lightning. Gonclaves appeared in 128 career WHL games, recording 34 goals, 52 assists and 86 points.

On December 22, 2020, the Lightning announced the re-signing of defenseman Erik Cernak to a three-year contract extension. Cernak played in 67 games last season and lead the team in hits with 172. In the Lightning's championship run, Cernak appeared in all 25 games, during which he averaged over 20 minutes of ice time per game, fourth-highest amongst Lightning defensemen.

On December 23, 2020, the Lightning announced the re-signing of forwards Mathieu Joseph and Alexander Volkov. Joseph was signed to a two-year extension and Volkov was signed to a one-year extension. Both forwards split the season between the Lightning and the Syracuse Crunch. Joseph played in 37 regular season games with the Lightning, scoring four goals and three assists. Volkov appeared in nine regular season games, recording one assist. Volkov also drew into the Lightning's Stanley Cup-clinching game win over the Dallas Stars.

The Lightning also announced the re-signing of defenseman Jan Rutta to a two-year extension. Rutta played in 33 regular season games, recording a goal and six assists. Rutta also plated in six playoff games, recording a lone assist during the Lightning's Stanley Cup run. Rutta was originally acquired by the Lightning via trade from the Chicago Blackhawks in 2019.

On December 24, 2020, the Lightning announced the re-signing of forward Anthony Cirelli to a three-year contract extension. Cirelli had 16 goals and 28 assists over 68 games in the regular season. Cirelli also recorded six assists in the Lightning's 25 playoff games. Along with winning the Stanley Cup, Cirelli finished the past season fourth in Frank J. Selke Trophy voting, which trophy is awarded to the NHL's best defensive forward.

On December 27, 2020, the Lightning announced that it had traded Braydon Coburn, Cedric Paquette and their 2021 second-round draft pick to the Ottawa Senators in exchange for Anders Nilsson and Marian Gaborik. Both Nilsson and Gaborik were immediately placed on long-term injured reserve for additional salary cap space to allow the Lightning to become salary cap compliant for the upcoming season.

== Training camp ==
=== January ===
On January 1, 2021, the Lightning announced its training camp roster for the 2020–21 season, which consisted of 25 forwards, 14 defensemen and 4 goaltenders. The notable absence from the roster was forward Nikita Kucherov, who was to miss at least all of the regular season after having hip surgery, with optimism that he would return to action in the playoffs.

The forward roster consists of Alex Barre-Boulet, Anthony Cirelli, Ross Colton, Blake Coleman, Jack Finley, Gage Goncalves, Barclay Goodrow, Yanni Gourde, Jimmy Huntington, Tyler Johnson, Mathieu Joseph, Boris Katchouk, Alex Killorn, Ryan Lohin, Patrick Maroon, Boo Nieves, Ondrej Palat, Brayden Point, Taylor Raddysh, Gemel Smith, Steven Stamkos, Mitchell Stephens, Alexander Volkov and Daniel Walcott.

The defensemen group consisted of Andreas Borgman, Erik Cernak, Sean Day, Cal Foote, Alex Green, Victor Hedman, Ryan McDonagh Jan Rutta, Luke Schenn, Dmitry Semykin, Mikhail Sergachev, Devante Stephens, Ben Thomas and Luke Witkowski.

The goaltending group consisted of Christopher Gibson, Spencer Martin, Curtis McElhinney and Andrei Vasilevskiy.

On January 8, 2021, the Lightning announced its first roster cuts for the upcoming season. The team assigned Ryan Lohin and Devante Stephens to Orlando Solar Bears of the ECHL. There were 41 players remaining after the first round of roster cuts.

On January 11, 2021, the Lightning announced the final round of roster moves for the start of the season. The Lightning assigned Alex Barre-Boulet, Ross Colton, Sean Day, Jack Finley, Gage Goncalves, Alex Green, Jimmy Huntington, Boris Katchouk, Taylor Raddysh and Dmitry Semykin to the Syracuse Crunch. The Lightning placed Spencer Martin, Daniel Walcott and Luke Witkowski on waivers for purposes of assignment to Syracuse.

The Lightning also announced that it had placed Andreas Borgman, Christopher Gibson, Tyler Johnson, Luke Schenn, Gemel Smith and Ben Thomas on waivers. If the players cleared waivers, they were to likely be destined for the team's taxi squad, which roster group the NHL created for teams' predicted roster challenges during the season due to the ongoing COVID-19 pandemic.

The following day, all the players that were placed on waivers the previous day had cleared without being claimed by another team. Those not destined for Syracuse were set to be assigned to the taxi squad on opening night the following day.

Latter that day the Lightning also announced that it had signed forward Boo Nieves to a one-year contract after joining the team on a PTO contract for training camp. Nieves had previously played in the New York Rangers system for the past four seasons.

After completing these moves, the team set-up its opening night roster: forwards Anthony Cirelli, Blake Coleman, Barclay Goodrow, Yanni Gourde, Mathieu Joseph, Alex Killorn, Patrick Maroon, Ondrej Palat, Brayden Point, Steven Stamkos, Mitchell Stephens and Alexander Volkov; defensemen Erik Cernak, Cal Foote, Victor Hedman, Ryan McDonagh, Jan Rutta and Mikhail Sergachev; and goaltenders Andrei Vasilevskiy and Curtis McElhinney.

The taxi squad roster consisted of Tyler Johnson (C), Gemel Smith (C), Luke Schenn (RD), Andreas Borgman (LD), Ben Thomas (RD) and Christopher Gibson (G). Lightning general manager Julien BriseBois stated that Johnson would be added to the active roster after the first game due to cap reasons. Due to the timing of his signing, Boo Nieves was unable to be assigned to the taxi squad until after the first game.

== Standings ==
Central Division
Pos	Team	GP	W	L	OTL	RW	GF	GA	GD	Pts
1	y – Carolina Hurricanes	56	36	12	8	27	179	136	+43	80
2	x – Florida Panthers	56	37	14	5	26	189	153	+36	79
3	x – Tampa Bay Lightning	56	36	17	3	29	181	147	+34	75
4	x – Nashville Predators	56	31	23	2	21	156	154	+2	64
5	Dallas Stars	56	23	19	14	17	158	154	+4	60
6	Chicago Blackhawks	56	24	25	7	15	161	186	−25	55
7	Detroit Red Wings	56	19	27	10	17	127	171	−44	48
8	Columbus Blue Jackets	56	18	26	12	12	137	187	−50	48

Source: National Hockey League
Rules for classification: 1) Fewer number of games played (GP, only during regular season); 2) Greater number of regulation wins (RW); 3) Greater number of wins in regulation and overtime, excluding shootout wins (ROW); 4) Greater number of total wins, including shootouts (W); 5) Greater number of points earned in head-to-head play; if teams played an uneven number of head-to-head games, the result of the first game on the home ice of the team with the extra home game is discarded; 6) Greater goal differential (GD); 7) Greater number of goals scored (GF)
x – Clinched playoff spot; y – Clinched division

== Schedule and results ==
=== Regular season ===
2020–21 Regular season game log
January: 4–1–1, 9 Points (home: 3–0–0; road: 1–1–1)

Game	Date	Opponent	Score	OT	Decision	Location	Attendance	Record	Points	Recap
1	January 13	Chicago Blackhawks	5–1		Vasilevskiy	Amalie Arena	Held without fans	1–0–0	2	
2	January 15	Chicago Blackhawks	5–2		Vasilevskiy	Amalie Arena	Held without fans	2–0–0	4	
—	January 17	Dallas Stars	Postponed due to positive COVID-19 tests of Dallas Stars players and staff. Makeup date: May 5.							
—	January 19	Dallas Stars	Postponed due to positive COVID-19 tests of Dallas Stars players and staff. Makeup date: May 7.							
3	January 21	@ Columbus Blue Jackets	3–2	OT	Vasilevskiy	Nationwide Arena	Held without fans	3–0–0	6	
4	January 23	@ Columbus Blue Jackets	2–5		Vasilevskiy	Nationwide Arena	Held without fans	3–1–0	6	
—	January 26	@ Carolina Hurricanes	Postponed due to multiple Carolina Hurricanes players placed in COVID-19 protocol. Makeup date: February 22.							
5	January 28	@ Carolina Hurricanes	0–1	OT	Vasilevskiy	PNC Arena	Held without fans	3–1–1	7	
6	January 30	Nashville Predators	4–3		Vasilevskiy	Amalie Arena	Held without fans	4–1–1	9	

February: 10–3–0, 20 Points (home: 6–1–0; road: 4–2–0)

Game	Date	Opponent	Score	OT	Decision	Location	Attendance	Record	Points	Recap
7	February 1	Nashville Predators	5–2		Vasilevskiy	Amalie Arena	Held without fans	5–1–1	11	
8	February 3	Detroit Red Wings	5–1		Vasilevskiy	Amalie Arena	Held without fans	6–1–1	13	
9	February 5	Detroit Red Wings	3–1		Vasilevskiy	Amalie Arena	Held without fans	7–1–1	15	
10	February 8	@ Nashville Predators	4–1		McElhinney	Bridgestone Arena	Not reported	8–1–1	17	
11	February 9	@ Nashville Predators	6–1		Vasilevskiy	Bridgestone Arena	Not reported	9–1–1	19	
12	February 11	@ Florida Panthers	2–5		Vasilevskiy	BB&T Center	3,808	9–2–1	19	
13	February 13	@ Florida Panthers	6–1		Vasilevskiy	BB&T Center	4,509	10–2–1	21	
14	February 15	Florida Panthers	4–6		McElhinney	Amalie Arena	100	10–3–1	21	
—	February 18	@ Dallas Stars	Postponed due to winter storm affecting the area. Makeup date: March 2.							
—	February 20	@ Dallas Stars	Postponed due to winter storm affecting the area. Makeup date: March 16.							
15	February 20	@ Carolina Hurricanes	0–4		Vasilevskiy	PNC Arena	Held without fans	10–4–1	21	
16	February 22	@ Carolina Hurricanes	4–2		Vasilevskiy	PNC Arena	Held without fans	11–4–1	23	
17	February 24	Carolina Hurricanes	3–0		Vasilevskiy	Amalie Arena	500	12–4–1	25	
18	February 25	Carolina Hurricanes	3–1		McElhinney	Amalie Arena	536	13–4–1	27	
19	February 27	Dallas Stars	5–0		Vasilevskiy	Amalie Arena	537	14–4–1	29	

March: 10–5–1, 21 Points (home: 4–2–0; road: 6–3–1)

Game	Date	Opponent	Score	OT	Decision	Location	Attendance	Record	Points	Recap
20	March 2	@ Dallas Stars	2–0		Vasilevskiy	American Airlines Center	4,067	15–4–1	31	
21	March 4	@ Chicago Blackhawks	3–2	OT	Vasilevskiy	United Center	Held without fans	16–4–1	33	
22	March 5	@ Chicago Blackhawks	3–4	SO	McElhinney	United Center	Held without fans	16–4–2	34	
23	March 7	@ Chicago Blackhawks	6–3		Vasilevskiy	United Center	Held without fans	17–4–2	36	
24	March 9	@ Detroit Red Wings	4–3	OT	Vasilevskiy	Little Caesars Arena	Held without fans	18–4–2	38	
25	March 11	@ Detroit Red Wings	4–6		McElhinney	Little Caesars Arena	Held without fans	18–5–2	38	
26	March 13	Nashville Predators	6–3		Vasilevskiy	Amalie Arena	3,800	19–5–2	40	
27	March 15	Nashville Predators	1–4		McElhinney	Amalie Arena	3,800	19–6–2	40	
28	March 16	@ Dallas Stars	4–3	SO	Vasilevskiy	American Airlines Center	4,057	20–6–2	42	
29	March 18	Chicago Blackhawks	4–2		Vasilevskiy	Amalie Arena	3,800	21–6–2	44	
30	March 20	Chicago Blackhawks	4–1		Vasilevskiy	Amalie Arena	3,800	22–6–2	46	
31	March 21	Florida Panthers	5–3		McElhinney	Amalie Arena	3,800	23–6–2	48	
32	March 23	@ Dallas Stars	2–1		Vasilevskiy	American Airlines Center	4,103	24–6–2	50	
33	March 25	@ Dallas Stars	3–4		Vasilevskiy	American Airlines Center	4,187	24–7–2	50	
34	March 27	@ Carolina Hurricanes	3–4		Vasilevskiy	PNC Arena	4,433	24–8–2	50	
35	March 30	Columbus Blue Jackets	1–3		McElhinney	Amalie Arena	3,800	24–9–2	50	

April: 10–5–0, 20 Points (home: 7–3–0; road: 3–2–0)

Game	Date	Opponent	Score	OT	Decision	Location	Attendance	Record	Points	Recap
36	April 1	Columbus Blue Jackets	3–2		Vasilevskiy	Amalie Arena	3,800	25–9–2	52	
37	April 3	Detroit Red Wings	2–1		Vasilevskiy	Amalie Arena	3,800	26–9–2	54	
38	April 4	Detroit Red Wings	1–5		Gibson	Amalie Arena	3,800	26–10–2	54	
39	April 6	@ Columbus Blue Jackets	2–4		Vasilevskiy	Nationwide Arena	4,080	26–11–2	54	
40	April 8	@ Columbus Blue Jackets	6–4		Vasilevskiy	Nationwide Arena	4,143	27–11–2	56	
41	April 10	@ Nashville Predators	3–0		Vasilevskiy	Bridgestone Arena	Not reported	28–11–2	58	
42	April 13	@ Nashville Predators	2–7		McElhinney	Bridgestone Arena	Not reported	28–12–2	58	
43	April 15	Florida Panthers	3–2	OT	Vasilevskiy	Amalie Arena	3,800	29–12–2	60	
44	April 17	Florida Panthers	3–5		Vasilevskiy	Amalie Arena	3,800	29–13–2	60	
45	April 19	Carolina Hurricanes	3–2	OT	Vasilevskiy	Amalie Arena	3,800	30–13–2	62	
46	April 20	Carolina Hurricanes	1–4		Vasilevskiy	Amalie Arena	3,800	30–14–2	62	
47	April 22	Columbus Blue Jackets	3–1		McElhinney	Amalie Arena	4,200	31–14–2	64	
48	April 25	Columbus Blue Jackets	4–3	OT	Vasilevskiy	Amalie Arena	4,200	32–14–2	66	
49	April 27	@ Chicago Blackhawks	7–4		Vasilevskiy	United Center	Held without fans	33–14–2	68	
50	April 29	Dallas Stars	3–0		Vasilevskiy	Amalie Arena	4,200	34–14–2	70	

May: 2–3–1, 5 Points (home: 1–1–0; road: 1–2–1)

Game	Date	Opponent	Score	OT	Decision	Location	Attendance	Record	Points	Recap
51	May 1	@ Detroit Red Wings	0–1	SO	McElhinney	Little Caesars Arena	Not reported	34–14–3	71	
52	May 2	@ Detroit Red Wings	2–1		Gibson	Little Caesars Arena	Not reported	35–14–3	73	
53	May 5	Dallas Stars	6–2		Vasilevskiy	Amalie Arena	4,200	36–14–3	75	
54	May 7	Dallas Stars	2–5		McElhinney	Amalie Arena	4,200	36–15–3	75	
55	May 8	@ Florida Panthers	1–5		Vasilevskiy	BB&T Center	5,040	36–16–3	75	
56	May 10	@ Florida Panthers	0–4		Vasilevskiy	BB&T Center	5,040	36–17–3	75	

Lightning score listed first;

Win (2 points) Loss (0 points) Overtime/shootout loss (1 point) Postponement

=== Playoffs ===
2021 Stanley Cup playoffs
First Round vs. Florida Panthers (C2) - Tampa Bay wins series 4–2

Game	Date	Opponent	Score	OT	Decision	Location	Attendance	Series	Recap
1	May 16	@ Florida Panthers	5–4		Vasilevskiy	BB&T Center	9,646	1–0	
2	May 18	@ Florida Panthers	3–1		Vasilevskiy	BB&T Center	9,646	2–0	
3	May 20	Florida Panthers	5–6	OT	Vasilevskiy	Amalie Arena	9,508	2–1	
4	May 22	Florida Panthers	6–2		Vasilevskiy	Amalie Arena	9,762	3–1	
5	May 24	@ Florida Panthers	1–4		Vasilevskiy	BB&T Center	11,551	3–2	
6	May 26	Florida Panthers	4–0		Vasilevskiy	Amalie Arena	10,092	4–2	

Second Round vs. Carolina Hurricanes (C1) - Tampa Bay wins series 4–1

Game	Date	Opponent	Score	OT	Decision	Location	Attendance	Series	Recap
1	May 30	@ Carolina Hurricanes	2–1		Vasilevskiy	PNC Arena	16,299	1–0	
2	June 1	@ Carolina Hurricanes	2–1		Vasilevskiy	PNC Arena	16,299	2–0	
3	June 3	Carolina Hurricanes	2–3	OT	Vasilevskiy	Amalie Arena	13,544	2–1	
4	June 5	Carolina Hurricanes	6–4		Vasilevskiy	Amalie Arena	13,773	3–1	
5	June 8	@ Carolina Hurricanes	2–0		Vasilevskiy	PNC Arena	16,299	4–1	

Stanley Cup Semifinals vs. New York Islanders (E4) - Tampa Bay wins series 4–3

Game	Date	Opponent	Score	OT	Decision	Location	Attendance	Series	Recap
1	June 13	New York Islanders	1–2		Vasilevskiy	Amalie Arena	14,513	0–1	
2	June 15	New York Islanders	4–2		Vasilevskiy	Amalie Arena	14,771	1–1	
3	June 17	@ New York Islanders	2–1		Vasilevskiy	Nassau Coliseum	12,978	2–1	
4	June 19	@ New York Islanders	2–3		Vasilevskiy	Nassau Coliseum	12,978	2–2	
5	June 21	New York Islanders	8–0		Vasilevskiy	Amalie Arena	14,791	3–2	
6	June 23	@ New York Islanders	2–3	OT	Vasilevskiy	Nassau Coliseum	12,978	3–3	
7	June 25	New York Islanders	1–0		Vasilevskiy	Amalie Arena	14,805	4–3	

Stanley Cup Finals vs. Montreal Canadiens (N4) - Tampa Bay wins series 4–1

Game	Date	Opponent	Score	OT	Decision	Location	Attendance	Series	Recap
1	June 28	Montreal Canadiens	5–1		Vasilevskiy	Amalie Arena	15,911	1–0	
2	June 30	Montreal Canadiens	3–1		Vasilevskiy	Amalie Arena	17,166	2–0	
3	July 2	@ Montreal Canadiens	6–3		Vasilevskiy	Bell Centre	3,500	3–0	
4	July 5	@ Montreal Canadiens	2–3	OT	Vasilevskiy	Bell Centre	3,500	3–1	
5	July 7	Montreal Canadiens	1–0		Vasilevskiy	Amalie Arena	18,110	4–1	

Lightning score listed first;

Win Loss If necessary

== Player stats ==
Final

=== Skaters ===
Regular season
Player	GP	G	A	Pts	+/−	PIM
Brayden Point	56	23	25	48	2	11
Ondrej Palat	55	15	31	46	1	26
Victor Hedman	54	9	36	45	5	28
Yanni Gourde	56	17	19	36	10	44
Steven Stamkos	38	17	17	34	4	16
Alex Killorn	56	15	18	33	−1	37
Blake Coleman	55	14	17	31	15	37
Mikhail Sergachev	56	4	26	30	5	30
Anthony Cirelli	50	9	13	22	0	10
Tyler Johnson	55	8	14	22	−1	16
Barclay Goodrow	55	6	14	20	16	52
Mathieu Joseph	56	12	7	19	3	10
Erik Cernak	46	5	13	18	8	38
Patrick Maroon	55	4	14	18	2	60
Ross Colton	30	9	3	12	3	16
Ryan McDonagh	50	4	8	12	13	14
Jan Rutta	35	0	8	8	12	22
Alexander Volkov^{‡}	19	3	2	5	2	4
Luke Schenn	38	2	2	4	2	51
Alex Barre-Boulet	15	3	0	3	0	0
Cal Foote	35	1	2	3	9	29
Gemel Smith	5	0	3	3	3	11
Andreas Borgman	7	0	2	2	−2	4
Mitchell Stephens	7	0	1	1	−5	0
David Savard^{†}	14	0	0	0	8	0
Ben Thomas	5	0	0	0	1	0
Fredrik Claesson^{†}	2	0	0	0	−1	12
Daniel Walcott	1	0	0	0	−1	5

Playoffs
Player	GP	G	A	Pts	+/−	PIM
Nikita Kucherov	23	8	24	32	6	14
Brayden Point	23	14	9	23	7	8
Steven Stamkos	23	8	10	18	0	4
Victor Hedman	23	2	16	18	1	8
Alex Killorn	19	8	9	17	−1	6
Ondrej Palat	23	5	8	13	8	10
Anthony Cirelli	23	5	7	12	9	20
Blake Coleman	23	3	8	11	5	22
Erik Cernak	21	1	9	10	12	16
Ryan McDonagh	23	0	8	8	18	14
Yanni Gourde	23	6	1	7	4	13
Tyler Johnson	23	4	3	7	3	0
Ross Colton	23	4	2	6	4	12
Barclay Goodrow	18	2	4	6	4	26
David Savard	20	0	5	5	0	6
Patrick Maroon	23	2	2	4	2	37
Jan Rutta	23	2	1	3	3	8
Mikhail Sergachev	23	0	3	3	0	18
Mathieu Joseph	6	0	2	2	0	0
Luke Schenn	8	1	0	1	1	9

=== Goaltenders ===
Regular season
Player	GP	GS	TOI	W	L	OT	GA	GAA	SA	SV%	SO	G	A	PIM
Andrei Vasilevskiy	42	42	2524	31	10	1	93	2.21	1237	.926	5	0	4	0
Curtis McElhinney	12	12	660	4	6	2	37	3.09	296	.875	1	0	0	2
Christopher Gibson	2	2	113	1	1	0	5	2.66	40	.875	0	0	0	0

Playoffs
Player	GP	GS	TOI	W	L	GA	GAA	SA	SV%	SO	G	A	PIM
Andrei Vasilevskiy	23	23	1390	16	7	44	1.90	699	.937	5	0	0	0

^{†}Denotes player spent time with another team before joining Tampa Bay. Stats reflect time with Tampa Bay only.
^{‡}Traded from Tampa Bay mid-season.
Bold/italics denotes franchise record

== Suspensions/fines ==
Player	Explanation	Length	Salary	Date issued
Patrick Maroon	Suspended for unsportsmanlike conduct against Brandon Montour during the regular season game against the Florida Panthers on May 8, 2021, at the BB&T Center.	1 game	$7,758.62	May 9, 2021
Patrick Maroon	Fined for unsportsmanlike conduct for his actions at the end of the game on May 24, 2021, against the Florida Panthers at the BB&T Center.	—	$3,879.31	May 25, 2021
Ryan McDonagh	Fined for cross-checking Mason Marchment during the playoff game on May 24, 2021, against the Florida Panthers at the BB&T Center.	—	$5,000	May 25, 2021

== Awards and honors ==
=== Awards ===
Regular season
Player	Award	Awarded
Steven Stamkos	NHL Third Star of the Week	January 18, 2021
Andrei Vasilevskiy	NHL First Star of the Week	March 1, 2021
Andrei Vasilevskiy	First Team All Star	June 29, 2021
Victor Hedman	Second team all star	June 29, 2021
Andrei Vasilevskiy	Conn Smythe Trophy	July 7, 2021

=== Milestones ===
Regular season
Player	Milestone	Reached
Cal Foote	1st career NHL game	January 13, 2021
Ryan McDonagh	300th career NHL point	January 21, 2021
Ondrej Palat	500th career NHL game	January 23, 2021
Brayden Point	300th career NHL game	January 28, 2021
Cal Foote	1st career NHL goal 1st career NHL point	January 30, 2021
Anthony Cirelli	100th career NHL point	January 30, 2021
Blake Coleman	100th career NHL point	February 3, 2021
Alexander Volkov	1st career NHL goal	February 13, 2021
Alex Killorn	600th career NHL game	February 20, 2021
Alex Barre-Boulet	1st career NHL game	February 22, 2021
Ross Colton	1st career NHL game 1st career NHL goal 1st career NHL point	February 24, 2021
Patrick Maroon	100th career NHL goal	March 7, 2021
Barclay Goodrow	300th career NHL game	March 9, 2021
Ross Colton	1st career NHL assist	March 16, 2021
Victor Hedman	500th career NHL point	March 16, 2021
Mikhail Sergachev	100th career NHL assist	March 20, 2021
Cal Foote	1st career NHL assist	March 25, 2021
Ben Thomas	1st career NHL game	April 4, 2021
Anthony Cirelli	200th career NHL game	April 4, 2021
Victor Hedman	800th career NHL game	April 4, 2021
Yanni Gourde	100th career NHL assist	April 8, 2021
Ryan McDonagh	700th career NHL game	April 13, 2021
David Savard	600th career NHL game	April 17, 2021
Victor Hedman	400th career NHL assist	April 17, 2021
Brayden Point	300th career NHL point	April 19, 2021
Alex Barre-Boulet	1st career NHL goal 1st career NHL point	April 25, 2021
Andrei Vasilevskiy	300th career NHL game	May 6, 2021
Tyler Johnson	200th career NHL assist	May 6, 2021
Blake Coleman	300th career NHL game	May 8, 2021
Daniel Walcott	1st career NHL game	May 10, 2021

Playoffs
Player	Milestone	Reached
Ross Colton	1st career playoff game	May 16, 2021
Patrick Maroon	100th career playoff game	May 18, 2021
Ross Colton	1st career playoff goal 1st career playoff point	May 20, 2021
Nikita Kucherov	100th career playoff point	May 20, 2021
Jon Cooper	100th career playoff game	May 30, 2021
Tyler Johnson	100th career playoff game	May 30, 2021
Alex Killorn	100th career playoff game	June 1, 2021
Ondrej Palat	100th career playoff game	June 1, 2021
Nikita Kucherov	100th career playoff game	June 5, 2021
Ross Colton	1st career playoff assist	June 5, 2021
Jan Rutta	1st career playoff goal	June 15, 2021
Andrei Vasilevskiy	5th career playoff shutout	June 25, 2021
Erik Cernak	1st career playoff goal	June 28, 2021
Mathieu Joseph	1st career playoff assist 1st career playoff point	July 2, 2021

== Transactions ==
The Lightning have been involved in the following transactions during the 2020–21 season.

=== Trades ===
Date	Details		Ref
October 7, 2020	To Montreal Canadiens 4th-round pick in 2020; 2nd-round pick in 2021	To Tampa Bay Lightning 2nd-round pick in 2020	
October 7, 2020	To Philadelphia Flyers 4th-round pick in 2020	To Tampa Bay Lightning 4th-round pick in 2020; 5th-round pick in 2020	
December 27, 2020	To Ottawa Senators Cedric Paquette; Braydon Coburn; 2nd-round pick in 2022	To Tampa Bay Lightning Anders Nilsson; Marian Gaborik	
March 24, 2021	To Anaheim Ducks Alexander Volkov	To Tampa Bay Lightning Antoine Morand conditional 7th-round pick in 2023	
April 10, 2021	To Detroit Red Wings 4th-round pick in 2021	To Tampa Bay Lightning David Savard	
April 10, 2021	To Columbus Blue Jackets 1st-round pick in 2021; 3rd-round pick in 2022	To Tampa Bay Lightning Brian Lashoff	
April 12, 2021	To San Jose Sharks Magnus Chrona	To Tampa Bay Lightning Fredrik Claesson	

=== Free agents ===
Date	Player	Team	Contract term	Ref
October 9, 2020	Kevin Shattenkirk	to Anaheim Ducks	3-year	
October 9, 2020	Carter Verhaeghe	to Florida Panthers	1-year	
October 9, 2020	Andreas Borgman	from San Antonio Rampage	1-year	
October 9, 2020	Christopher Gibson	from Bridgeport Sound Tigers	1-year	
October 11, 2020	Zach Bogosian	to Toronto Maple Leafs	1-year	
October 11, 2020	Scott Wedgewood	to New Jersey Devils	1-year	
January 12, 2021	Boo Nieves	from New York Rangers	1-year	
May 12, 2021	Simon Ryfors	from Rogle BK	1-year	

=== Waivers ===
Date	Player	Team	Ref

=== Contract terminations ===
Date	Player	Via	Ref

=== Retirement ===
Date	Player	Ref

=== Signings ===
Date	Player	Contract term	Ref
October 7, 2020	Mitchell Stephens	2-year	
October 7, 2020	Gemel Smith	1-year	
October 9, 2020	Patrick Maroon	2-year	
October 9, 2020	Luke Schenn	1-year	
October 14, 2020	Ross Colton	1-year	
November 25, 2020	Mikhail Sergachev	3-year	
December 12, 2020	Jack Finley	3-year	
December 13, 2020	Gage Goncalves	3-year	
December 22, 2020	Jan Rutta	2-year	
December 22, 2020	Erik Cernak	3-year	
December 23, 2020	Alexander Volkov	1-year	
December 23, 2020	Mathieu Joseph	2-year	
December 24, 2020	Anthony Cirelli	3-year	
March 9, 2021	Daniel Walcott	2-year	
March 31, 2021	Odeen Tufto	1-year	
April 19, 2021	Cole Koepke	2-year	
May 1, 2021	Hugo Alnefelt	3-year	
May 2, 2021	Amir Miftakhov	3-year	
May 11, 2021	Spencer Martin	1-year	
May 19, 2021	Jack Thompson	3-year	

== Draft picks ==
Below are the Tampa Bay Lightning's selections at the 2020 NHL entry draft, which was held on October 6 and 7, 2020, via video conference call due to the COVID-19 pandemic.

Round	#	Player	Pos	Nationality	College/Junior/Club team (League)
2	57^{1}	Jack Finley	C	Canada	Spokane Chiefs (WHL)
2	62	Gage Goncalves	C	Canada	Everett Silvertips (WHL)
3	85^{2}	Maxim Groshev	RW	Russia	HC Neftekhimik Nizhnekamsk (KHL)
3	93	Jack Thompson	D	Canada	Sudbury Wolves (OHL)
4	116^{3}	Eamon Powell	D	United States	USA Hockey National Team Development Program
5	147^{3}	Jaydon Dureau	LW	Canada	Portland Winterhawks (WHL)
6	157^{4}	Nick Capone	RW	United States	University of Connecticut (Hockey East)
6	186	Amir Miftakhov	G	Russia	Ak Bars Kazan (KHL)
7	217	Declan McDonnell	RW	United States	Kitchener Rangers (OHL)

Notes:

1. The St. Louis Blues' second-round pick went to the Tampa Bay Lightning as the result of a trade on October 7, 2020, that sent a fourth-round pick in 2020 (124th overall) and a second-round pick in 2021 to Montreal in exchange for this pick.
  Montreal previously acquired this pick as the result of a trade on February 18, 2020, that sent Marco Scandella to St. Louis in exchange for a conditional fourth-round pick in 2021 and this pick.
2. The Philadelphia Flyers' third-round pick went to the Tampa Bay Lightning as the result of a trade on February 24, 2020, that sent Anthony Greco and a first-round pick in 2020 to San Jose in exchange for Barclay Goodrow and this pick.
  San Jose previously acquired this pick as the result of a trade on June 18, 2019, that sent Justin Braun to Philadelphia in exchange for a second-round pick in 2019 and this pick.
3. The Philadelphia Flyers' forth and fifth-round pick went to the Tampa Bay Lightning as the result of a trade on October 7, 2020, that sent Detroit's fourth-round pick in 2020 (94th overall) to Philadelphia in exchange for a fourth-round pick in 2020 (116th overall) and fifth-round pick in 2020 (147th overall) for this pick.
4. The Tampa Bay Lightning's fifth-round pick will go to the Ottawa Senators as the result of a trade on July 30, 2019, that sent Mike Condon and a sixth-round pick in 2020 to Tampa Bay in exchange for Ryan Callahan and this pick.
