= 2006–07 Slovak Extraliga season =

The Slovak Extraliga 2006–07 was the fourteenth regular season of the Slovak Extraliga, the top level of professional ice hockey in Slovakia.

== Regular season ==
=== Final standings ===
| Po. | Club | GP | W | OTW | OTL | L | GF | GA | PTS |
|---|---|---|---|---|---|---|---|---|---|
| 1. | HC Košice | 54 | 32 | 5 | 5 | 12 | 200 | 131 | 106 |
| 2. | HKm Zvolen | 54 | 29 | 6 | 4 | 15 | 159 | 137 | 99 |
| 3. | HC Slovan Bratislava | 54 | 27 | 6 | 5 | 16 | 179 | 143 | 93 |
| 4. | HC Dukla Trenčín | 54 | 27 | 5 | 5 | 17 | 178 | 128 | 91 |
| 5. | MHC Martin | 54 | 24 | 5 | 4 | 21 | 163 | 144 | 82 |
| 6. | HK Aquacity ŠKP Poprad | 54 | 24 | 3 | 4 | 23 | 159 | 148 | 78 |
| 7. | HK Nitra | 54 | 19 | 9 | 5 | 21 | 149 | 156 | 75 |
| 8. | HK 36 Skalica | 54 | 17 | 2 | 3 | 32 | 144 | 202 | 55 |
| 9. | MHK 32 LI-PA L. Mikuláš | 54 | 16 | 1 | 2 | 35 | 139 | 211 | 50 |
| 10. | MsHK Žilina | 54 | 11 | 2 | 7 | 34 | 121 | 191 | 37 |

Key - GP: Games played, W: Wins, OTW: Over time wins, OTL: Over time losses, L: Losses, GF: Goals for, GA: Goals against, PTS: Points.

== Playoffs ==
=== Quarterfinals ===
| Team 1. | Score | Team 2. |
|---|---|---|
| HC Košice | 4:1 | HK 36 Skalica |
| HC Košice | 6:1, 1:2PS, 4:1, 5:4PS, 5:1 | HK 36 Skalica |
| HKm Zvolen | 4:2 | HK Nitra |
| HKm Zvolen | 1:3, 2:3PS, 7:3, 4:3PS, 2:1, 3:2 | HK Nitra |
| Slovan Bratislava | 4:2 | ŠKP Poprad |
| Slovan Bratislava | 1:4, 2:1, 1:3, 5:3, 3:0, 4:1 | ŠKP Poprad |
| Dukla Trenčín | 4:0 | MHC Martin |
| Dukla Trenčín | 3:2, 6:2, 3:2, 3:2 | MHC Martin |

=== Semifinals ===
| Team 1. | Score | Team 2. |
|---|---|---|
| HC Košice | 2:4 | Dukla Trenčín |
| HC Košice | 1:2, 6:2, 2:3, 3:4, 3:2PS, 2:4 | Dukla Trenčín |
| HKm Zvolen | 0:4 | Slovan Bratislava |
| HKm Zvolen | 0:4, 1:3, 1:10, 1:3 | Slovan Bratislava |

=== Finals ===
| Team 1. | Score | Team 2. |
|---|---|---|
| Slovan Bratislava | 4:0 | Dukla Trenčín |
| Slovan Bratislava | 4:2, 5:3, 3:1, 4:1 | Dukla Trenčín |

Abbreviations - OT: Overtime, PS: Shootout

=== Playoff bracket ===
Quarterfinals
1. | HC Košice | 4
8. | HK 36 Skalica | 1
4. | Dukla Trenčín | 4
5. | MHC Martin | 0
2. | HKm Zvolen | 4
7. | HK Nitra | 2
3. | HC Slovan | 4
6. | ŠKP Poprad | 2

Semifinals
1. | HC Košice | 2
4. | Dukla Trenčín | 4
2. | HKm Zvolen | 0
3. | HC Slovan | 4

Final
4. | Dukla Trenčín | 0
3. | HC Slovan | 4

== Scoring Leaders ==
Regular season

| # | Player | Club | GP | G | A | PTS |
| 1. | (Slovakia) René Školiak | Skalica | 53 | 20 | 50 | 70 |
| 2. | (Slovakia) Marek Uram | Slovan | 53 | 31 | 32 | 63 |
| 3. | (Slovakia) Tibor Melichárek | Trenčín | 54 | 29 | 31 | 60 |
| 4. | (Czech Republic) Filip Turek | Zvolen | 54 | 17 | 36 | 53 |
| 5. | (Slovakia) Arne Kroták | Poprad | 51 | 26 | 23 | 49 |

Key - GP: Games played, G: Goals, A: Assists, PTS: Points.

Play-off

| # | Player | Club | GP | G | A | PTS |
| 1. | (Slovakia) Marek Uram | Slovan | 14 | 12 | 9 | 21 |
| 2. | (Slovakia) Martin Kuľha | Slovan | 14 | 12 | 7 | 19 |
| 3. | (Slovakia) Roman Kukumberg | Slovan | 14 | 6 | 9 | 15 |
| 4. | (Czech Republic) Petr Pavlas | Slovan | 14 | 2 | 12 | 14 |
| 5. | (Slovakia) Tibor Melichárek | Trenčín | 14 | 9 | 4 | 13 |
| 5. | (Slovakia) Ján Pardavý | Trenčín | 14 | 6 | 7 | 13 |

== 2006-07 All Star Team ==
| Player | Post | Club |
| (Finland) Sasu Hovi | G | Slovan |
| (Slovakia) Marcel Šterbák | D | Košice |
| (Slovakia) Daniel Babka | D | Zvolen |
| (Slovakia) Marek Uram | LW | Slovan |
| (Slovakia) Roman Kukumberg | C | Slovan |
| (Slovakia) Tibor Melichárek | RW | Trenčín |

| Coach | Club |
| (Slovakia) Peter Oremus | Skalica |
