= 1975–76 1. Slovenská národná hokejová liga season =

- League: (Czechoslovakia) 1. SNHL
- Sport: Ice hockey
- Teams: 12

Regular season
- League Champion: TJ Lokomotíva Bučina Zvolen

Seasons
- 1974–75 1976–77

The 1975–76 1. Slovenská národná hokejová liga season was the 7th season of the 1. Slovenská národná hokejová liga, the second level of ice hockey in Czechoslovakia alongside the 1. Česká národní hokejová liga. 12 teams participated in the league, and TJ Lokomotíva Bučina Zvolen won the championship. TJ Spartak BEZ Bratislava relegated.

== Regular season ==
=== Standings ===
Pos	Team	Pld	W	D	L	GF	GA	GD	Pts	Qualification
1	TJ Lokomotíva Bučina Zvolen	44	31	5	8	232	108	+124	67	Champion
2	TJ Iskra Smrečina Banská Bystrica	44	25	6	13	191	171	+20	56	
3	TJ Spartak SMZ Dubnica nad Váhom	44	21	11	12	164	117	+47	53	
4	ASVŠ Dukla Trenčín	44	25	2	17	230	148	+82	52	
5	TJ Partizán Liptovský Mikuláš	44	23	3	18	194	163	+31	49	
6	TJ Strojárne Martin	44	19	7	18	180	198	−18	45	
7	TJ ZVL Skalica	44	16	7	21	166	185	−19	39	
8	TJ Plastika Nitra	44	15	9	20	148	174	−26	39	
9	TJ LS Poprad	44	15	6	23	152	204	−52	36	
10	TJ ZPA Prešov	44	14	6	24	112	179	−67	34	
11	TJ ZVL Žilina	44	13	6	25	155	212	−57	32	
12	TJ Spartak BEZ Bratislava	44	11	4	29	155	220	−65	26	Relegated

Source: 1. Slovenská národná hokejová liga

== Qualification to 1976–77 Czechoslovak Extraliga ==
TJ Gottwaldov	6–0	TJ Lokomotíva Bučina Zvolen

TJ Gottwaldov	4–2	TJ Lokomotíva Bučina Zvolen

TJ Lokomotíva Bučina Zvolen	4–1	TJ Gottwaldov

TJ Lokomotíva Bučina Zvolen	3–1	TJ Gottwaldov

TJ Gottwaldov	5–3	TJ Lokomotíva Bučina Zvolen

TJ Lokomotíva Bučina Zvolen	4–1	TJ Gottwaldov

TJ Gottwaldov	4–2	TJ Lokomotíva Bučina Zvolen

- TJ Gottwaldov – TJ Lokomotíva Bučina Zvolen 4–3 (6–0, 4–2, 1–4, 1–3, 5–3, 1–4, 4–2)
- TJ Gottwaldov won the series 4–3 and qualified to 1976–77 Czechoslovak Extraliga.
