= 1974–75 1. Slovenská národná hokejová liga season =

- League: (Czechoslovakia) 1. SNHL
- Sport: Ice hockey
- Teams: 12

Regular season
- League Champion: TJ Lokomotíva Bučina Zvolen

Seasons
- 1973–74 1975–76

The 1974–75 1. Slovenská národná hokejová liga season was the 6th season of the 1. Slovenská národná hokejová liga, the second level of ice hockey in Czechoslovakia alongside the 1. Česká národní hokejová liga. 12 teams participated in the league, and TJ Lokomotíva Bučina Zvolen won the championship. TJ ŽS Spišská Nová Ves relegated.

== Regular season ==
=== Standings ===
Pos	Team	Pld	W	D	L	GF	GA	GD	Pts	Qualification
1	TJ Lokomotíva Bučina Zvolen	44	35	3	6	252	114	+138	73	Champion
2	ASVŠ Dukla Trenčín	44	32	3	9	220	143	+77	67	
3	ŠK Liptovský Mikuláš	44	25	6	13	209	175	+34	56	
4	TJ ZVL Žilina	44	23	5	16	220	180	+40	51	
5	TJ Strojárne Martin	44	23	4	17	206	182	+24	50	
6	TJ ZVL Skalica	44	20	3	21	172	185	−13	43	
7	TJ Spartak SMZ Dubnica nad Váhom	44	17	3	24	160	208	−48	37	
8	TJ Spartak BEZ Bratislava	44	14	8	22	130	184	−54	36	
9	TJ ZPA Prešov	44	16	3	25	133	169	−36	35	
10	TJ Iskra Smrečina Banská Bystrica	44	16	2	26	191	189	+2	34	
11	TJ LVS Poprad	44	14	2	28	165	241	−76	30	
12	TJ ŽS Spišská Nová Ves	44	7	2	35	123	211	−88	16	Relegated

Source: 1. Slovenská národná hokejová liga

== Qualification to 1975–76 Czechoslovak Extraliga ==
TJ Lokomotíva Bučina Zvolen	2–4	TJ Ingstav Brno

TJ Lokomotíva Bučina Zvolen	1–6	TJ Ingstav Brno

TJ Ingstav Brno	1–2	TJ Lokomotíva Bučina Zvolen

TJ Ingstav Brno	6–1	TJ Lokomotíva Bučina Zvolen

TJ Lokomotíva Bučina Zvolen	0–5	TJ Ingstav Brno

- TJ Lokomotíva Bučina Zvolen – TJ Ingstav Brno 1–4 (2–4, 1–6, 2–1, 1–6, 0–5)
- TJ Ingstav Brno won the series 4–1 and qualified to 1975–76 Czechoslovak Extraliga.
