= Matúš Sukeľ =

Slovak ice hockey player (born 1996)

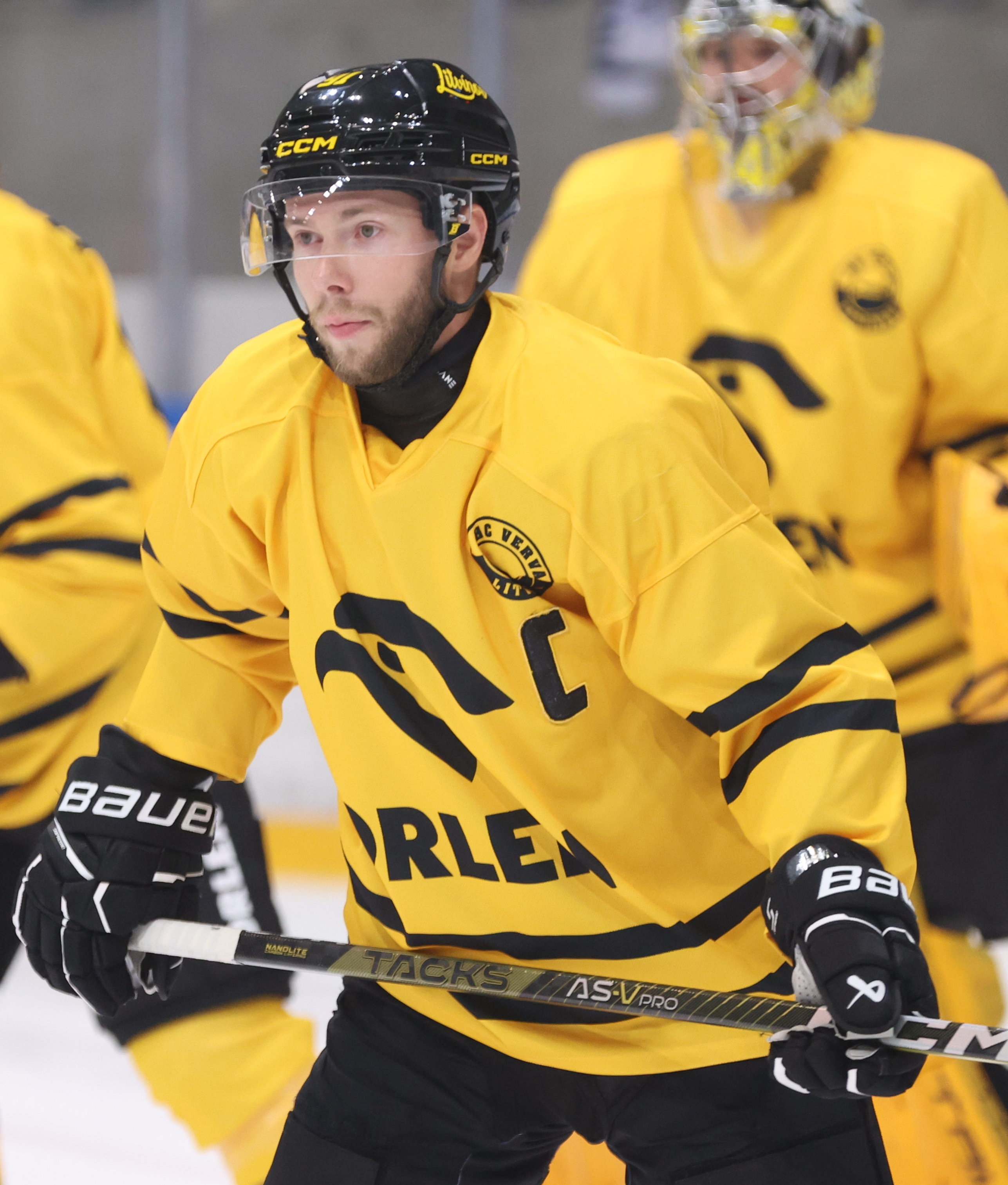
- Matúš Sukeľ, 2024
- Born: 23 January 1996 (age 30) Liptovský Mikuláš, Slovakia
- Height: 5 ft 9 in (175 cm)
- Weight: 172 lb (78 kg; 12 st 4 lb)
- Position: Forward
- Shoots: Left
- ELH team Former teams: HC Litvínov; MHk 32 Liptovský Mikuláš; HK Orange 20; HC Slovan Bratislava; HC Sparta Praha
- National team: Slovakia
- Playing career: 2013–present

Matúš Sukeľ (born 23 January 1996) is a Slovak professional ice hockey player who is a forward for HC Litvínov of the Czech Extraliga (ELH). He was selected and competed in the 2018 Winter Olympics for Slovakia. He is twin brother of Jakub Sukeľ.

== Career statistics ==
=== Regular season and playoffs ===
| | | | Regular season | | | | | Playoffs |
| Season | Team | League | GP | G | A | Pts | PIM | GP | G | A | Pts | PIM |
|---|---|---|---|---|---|---|---|---|---|---|---|---|
| 2011–12 | MHk 32 Liptovský Mikuláš | SVK U18 | 32 | 11 | 6 | 17 | 12 | — | — | — | — | — |
| 2012–13 | MHk 32 Liptovský Mikuláš | SVK U18 | 39 | 38 | 30 | 68 | 48 | 12 | 3 | 9 | 12 | 0 |
| 2012–13 | MHk 32 Liptovský Mikuláš | SVK U20 | 8 | 2 | 4 | 6 | 2 | 2 | 0 | 1 | 1 | 0 |
| 2013–14 | Slovakia U18 | Slovak.1 | 44 | 14 | 11 | 25 | 14 | — | — | — | — | — |
| 2013–14 | MHk 32 Liptovský Mikuláš | Slovak.1 | — | — | — | — | — | 3 | 0 | 0 | 0 | 0 |
| 2014–15 | HK Orange 20 | SVK | 20 | 5 | 5 | 10 | 12 | — | — | — | — | — |
| 2014–15 | MHk 32 Liptovský Mikuláš | SVK U20 | 5 | 3 | 3 | 6 | 2 | 12 | 6 | 7 | 13 | 12 |
| 2014–15 | MHk 32 Liptovský Mikuláš | Slovak.1 | 6 | 1 | 3 | 4 | 4 | — | — | — | — | — |
| 2015–16 | HK Orange 20 | SVK | 11 | 2 | 3 | 5 | 4 | — | — | — | — | — |
| 2015–16 | HK Orange 20 | Slovak.1 | 7 | 2 | 5 | 7 | 16 | — | — | — | — | — |
| 2015–16 | Tappara | Jr. A | 19 | 6 | 3 | 9 | 10 | 3 | 0 | 0 | 0 | 0 |
| 2016–17 | MHk 32 Liptovský Mikuláš | SVK U20 | 1 | 1 | 5 | 6 | 0 | — | — | — | — | — |
| 2016–17 | MHk 32 Liptovský Mikuláš | SVK | 54 | 21 | 16 | 37 | 24 | — | — | — | — | — |
| 2016–17 | HC Slovan Bratislava | KHL | 5 | 0 | 0 | 0 | 0 | — | — | — | — | — |
| 2017–18 | MHk 32 Liptovský Mikuláš | SVK | 53 | 19 | 12 | 31 | 42 | — | — | — | — | — |
| 2018–19 | HC Slovan Bratislava | KHL | 60 | 10 | 8 | 18 | 39 | — | — | — | — | — |
| 2018–19 | MHk 32 Liptovský Mikuláš | SVK | 1 | 0 | 0 | 0 | 0 | — | — | — | — | — |
| 2019–20 | HC Sparta Praha | ELH | 52 | 9 | 7 | 16 | 32 | — | — | — | — | — |
| 2020–21 | HC Sparta Praha | ELH | 52 | 9 | 10 | 19 | 30 | 11 | 0 | 1 | 1 | 10 |
| 2021–22 | HC Litvínov | ELH | 35 | 7 | 6 | 13 | 16 | — | — | — | — | — |
| 2022–23 | HC Litvínov | ELH | 52 | 9 | 18 | 27 | 52 | 3 | 1 | 2 | 3 | 0 |
| 2023–24 | HC Litvínov | ELH | 15 | 6 | 4 | 10 | 6 | 13 | 1 | 4 | 5 | 8 |
| 2024–25 | HC Litvínov | ELH | 52 | 18 | 17 | 35 | 38 | 4 | 3 | 1 | 4 | 4 |
| Slovak totals | | | 139 | 47 | 36 | 83 | 82 | — | — | — | — | — |
| KHL totals | | | 65 | 10 | 8 | 18 | 39 | — | — | — | — | — |
| ELH totals | | | 258 | 58 | 62 | 120 | 174 | 31 | 5 | 8 | 13 | 22 |

Medal record

Representing Slovakia

Ice hockey

IIHF World U20 Championship
| Bronze medal – third place | 2015 Canada | |

=== International ===
| Year | Team | Event | Result | GP | G | A | Pts | PIM |
|---|---|---|---|---|---|---|---|---|
| 2013 | Slovakia | IH18 | 8th | 4 | 0 | 0 | 0 | 0 |
| 2014 | Slovakia | WJC18 | 8th | 5 | 0 | 0 | 0 | 2 |
| 2015 | Slovakia | WJC | 3rd place, bronze medalist(s) | 7 | 1 | 0 | 1 | 2 |
| 2016 | Slovakia | WJC | 7th | 5 | 1 | 3 | 4 | 4 |
| 2018 | Slovakia | OG | 11th | 1 | 0 | 0 | 0 | 0 |
| 2019 | Slovakia | WC | 9th | 7 | 5 | 0 | 5 | 0 |
| 2021 | Slovakia | WC | 8th | 7 | 1 | 0 | 1 | 2 |
| 2023 | Slovakia | WC | 9th | 7 | 1 | 0 | 1 | 0 |
| 2024 | Slovakia | WC | 7th | 8 | 2 | 2 | 4 | 4 |
| 2024 | Slovakia | OGQ | Q | 3 | 1 | 0 | 1 | 0 |
| 2025 | Slovakia | WC | 11th | 7 | 1 | 1 | 2 | 8 |
| 2026 | Slovakia | OG | 4th | 6 | 1 | 0 | 1 | 2 |
| Junior totals | | | | 21 | 2 | 3 | 5 | 8 |
| Senior totals | | | | 46 | 12 | 3 | 15 | 16 |
