= Nolan Foote =

Canadian ice hockey player (born 2000)

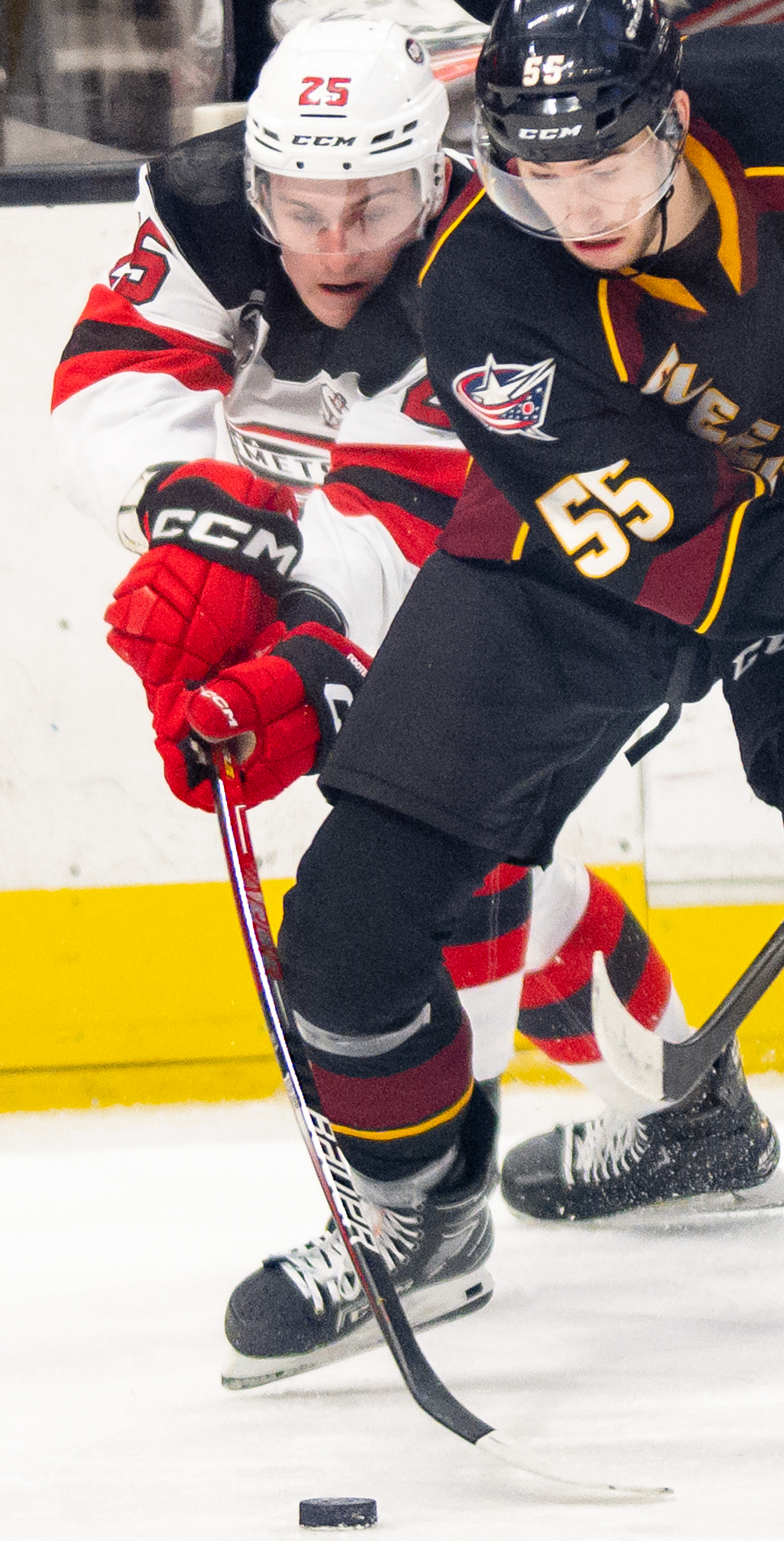
- Foote (left) with the Utica Comets in 2023
- Born: November 29, 2000 (age 25) Englewood, Colorado, U.S.
- Height: 6 ft 3 in (191 cm)
- Weight: 196 lb (89 kg; 14 st 0 lb)
- Position: Winger
- Shoots: Left
- NHL team (P) Cur. team Former teams: Philadelphia Flyers; Lehigh Valley Phantoms (AHL); New Jersey Devils; Florida Panthers
- NHL draft: 27th overall, 2019; Tampa Bay Lightning
- Playing career: 2021–present

Nolan Foote (born November 29, 2000) is an American-born Canadian professional ice hockey player who is a winger for the Lehigh Valley Phantoms of the American Hockey League (AHL) while under contract to the Philadelphia Flyers of the National Hockey League (NHL). He was drafted 27th overall by the Tampa Bay Lightning in the first round of the 2019 NHL entry draft. He is the son of former NHL defenseman Adam Foote and the younger brother of defenseman Cal Foote.

== Playing career ==
Foote was selected by the Kelowna Rockets in the 2015 Western Hockey League Draft with the 43rd overall pick, while playing with the Colorado Thunderbirds at the T1EHL under-16 level. Foote's older brother Cal was previously selected by the Rockets in the 2013 draft.

On June 21, 2019, Foote was selected by the Tampa Bay Lightning 27th overall in the 2019 NHL entry draft. Foote again joined his brother Cal in being selected by the same franchise. Cal was previously selected by the Lightning in the 2017 NHL entry draft. Before being drafted, Foote played the past three seasons in the WHL for the Rockets. Foote has skated in 168 career games, recording 68 goals, 70 assists, and 138 points.

On June 25, 2019, Foote was signed to a three-year, entry-level contract with the Tampa Bay Lightning.

On February 16, 2020, his contract rights, along with a first round pick in the 2020 NHL entry draft, were traded to the New Jersey Devils in exchange for forward Blake Coleman. He started the 2020–21 season with the Binghamton Devils of the American Hockey League (AHL) and was called up to the New Jersey Devils' taxi squad on April 17, 2021. He made his NHL debut the following day against the New York Rangers, and recorded his first NHL point in that game by assisting on a goal by Nico Hischier.

Entering the 2023–24 season, which saw the brothers reunited under contract to the Devils, Foote sustained an upper-body injury in training camp and began the year on injured reserve. Although the initial expectation was that he would return in late November 2023, he did not return to play until February 26, 2024, when he was assigned to the Utica Comets of the AHL on a conditioning loan. Seeing action in four NHL games after his conditioning loan, he recorded one goal.

Foote signed a one-year, two-way contract with the Devils for the 2024–25 season on August 12, 2024.

After five seasons within the Devils organization, Foote left as a free agent upon not being tendered a qualifying offer. On July 1, 2025, Foote was signed to a one-year, two-way contract with the Florida Panthers for the 2025–26 season.

On July 3, 2026, having left the Panthers after a lone season, Foote was reported to have signed as a free agent to a one-year, two-way contract with the Philadelphia Flyers for the 2026–27 season. The signing was not officially announced until August 19.

== Career statistics ==
=== Regular season and playoffs ===
			Regular season					Playoffs
Season	Team	League	GP	G	A	Pts	PIM	GP	G	A	Pts	PIM
2016–17	Kelowna Rockets	WHL	52	19	16	35	25	17	2	6	8	4
2017–18	Kelowna Rockets	WHL	50	13	27	40	31	4	1	1	2	4
2018–19	Kelowna Rockets	WHL	66	36	27	63	62	—	—	—	—	—
2019–20	Kelowna Rockets	WHL	27	15	18	33	49	—	—	—	—	—
2020–21	Binghamton Devils	AHL	24	7	10	17	6	—	—	—	—	—
2020–21	New Jersey Devils	NHL	6	1	1	2	0	—	—	—	—	—
2021–22	Utica Comets	AHL	55	14	18	32	48	5	1	2	3	2
2021–22	New Jersey Devils	NHL	7	3	1	4	0	—	—	—	—	—
2022–23	Utica Comets	AHL	55	20	17	37	27	1	0	0	0	0
2022–23	New Jersey Devils	NHL	6	1	0	1	0	—	—	—	—	—
2023–24	Utica Comets	AHL	4	3	1	4	2	—	—	—	—	—
2023–24	New Jersey Devils	NHL	4	1	0	1	0	—	—	—	—	—
2024–25	Utica Comets	AHL	53	18	21	39	29	—	—	—	—	—
2024–25	New Jersey Devils	NHL	7	0	1	1	0	—	—	—	—	—
2025–26	Charlotte Checkers	AHL	54	14	18	32	40	3	1	1	2	0
2025–26	Florida Panthers	NHL	12	1	0	1	6	—	—	—	—	—
NHL totals			42	7	3	10	0	—	—	—	—	—

Medal record

Representing Canada

Men's ice hockey

World Junior Championships
Gold medal – first place	2020 Czech Republic	

=== International ===
Year	Team	Event	Result	GP	G	A	Pts	PIM
2016	Canada Black	U17	2nd place, silver medalist(s)	6	0	2	2	8
2017	Canada	IH18	1st place, gold medalist(s)	5	1	1	2	0
2020	Canada	WJC	1st place, gold medalist(s)	7	3	2	5	29
Junior totals				18	4	5	9	37

Awards and achievements
Preceded by Callan Foote	Tampa Bay Lightning first-round draft pick 2019	Succeeded by Isaac Howard
