= 1970–71 1. Slovenská národná hokejová liga season =

- League: (Czechoslovakia) 1. SNHL
- Sport: Ice hockey
- Teams: 12

Regular season
- League Champion: AŠD Dukla Trenčín

Seasons
- 1969–70 1971–72

The 1970–71 1. Slovenská národná hokejová liga season was the 2nd season of the 1. Slovenská národná hokejová liga, the second level of ice hockey in Czechoslovakia alongside the 1. Česká národní hokejová liga. 12 teams participated in the league, and AŠD Dukla Trenčín won the championship. TJ ZPA Prešov and TJ Strojárne Martin relegated.

== Regular season ==
=== Standings ===
Pos	Team	Pld	W	D	L	GF	GA	GD	Pts	Qualification
1	AŠD Dukla Trenčín	22	20	1	1	98	34	+64	41	Qualification to Group 1–6
2	ŠK Liptovský Mikuláš	22	17	2	3	104	55	+49	36	Qualification to Group 1–6
3	TJ LVS Poprad	22	10	3	9	90	62	+28	23	Qualification to Group 1–6
4	TJ Spartak BEZ Bratislava	22	9	5	8	70	83	−13	23	Qualification to Group 1–6
5	TJ Slovan CHZJD Bratislava B	22	10	2	10	78	71	+7	22	Qualification to Group 1–6
6	TJ Lokomotíva Bučina Zvolen	22	10	2	10	61	96	−35	22	Qualification to Group 1–6
7	VTJ Dukla Trnava	22	9	2	11	65	72	−7	20	Qualification to Group 7–12
8	TJ ZPA Prešov	22	9	1	12	68	82	−14	19	Qualification to Group 7–12
9	TJ Spartak SMZ Dubnica nad Váhom	22	8	2	12	71	79	−8	18	Qualification to Group 7–12
10	TJ Iskra Smrečina Banská Bystrica	22	8	2	12	64	81	−17	18	Qualification to Group 7–12
11	TJ ZVL Žilina	22	7	2	13	75	90	−15	16	Qualification to Group 7–12
12	TJ Strojárne Martin	22	1	2	19	52	124	−72	4	Qualification to Group 7–12

Source: 1. Slovenská národná hokejová liga

=== Group 1–6 ===
Pos	Team	Pld	W	D	L	GF	GA	GD	Pts	Qualification
1	AŠD Dukla Trenčín	32	26	2	4	149	66	+83	54	Champion
2	ŠK Liptovský Mikuláš	32	20	6	6	151	98	+53	46	
3	TJ LVS Poprad	32	15	5	12	133	89	+44	35	
4	TJ Spartak BEZ Bratislava	32	13	6	13	114	115	−1	32	
5	TJ Slovan CHZJD Bratislava B	32	13	4	15	118	136	−18	30	
6	TJ Lokomotíva Bučina Zvolen	32	14	2	16	97	140	−43	30	

Source: 1. Slovenská národná hokejová liga

=== Group 7–12 ===
Pos	Team	Pld	W	D	L	GF	GA	GD	Pts	Qualification
7	TJ Spartak SMZ Dubnica nad Váhom	32	15	3	14	113	110	+3	33	
8	VTJ Dukla Trnava	32	14	2	16	122	109	+13	30	
9	TJ Iskra Smrečina Banská Bystrica	32	14	2	16	104	118	−14	30	
10	TJ ZVL Žilina	32	13	3	16	120	119	+1	29	
11	TJ ZPA Prešov	32	13	2	17	92	120	−28	28	Relegated
12	TJ Strojárne Martin	32	2	3	27	80	173	−93	7	Relegated

Source: 1. Slovenská národná hokejová liga

== Qualification to 1971–72 Czechoslovak Extraliga ==
Pos	Team	Pld	W	D	L	GF	GA	GD	Pts	Qualification
1	TJ Gottwaldov	6	5	0	1	25	11	+14	10	Qualify
2	AŠD Dukla Trenčín	6	4	0	2	22	15	+7	8	
3	TJ VTŽ Chomutov	6	2	0	4	19	21	−2	4	
4	TJ DP I. ČLTK Praha	6	1	0	5	12	31	−19	2	

Source: 1. Slovenská národná hokejová liga
