= Marek Uram =

Slovak ice hockey player

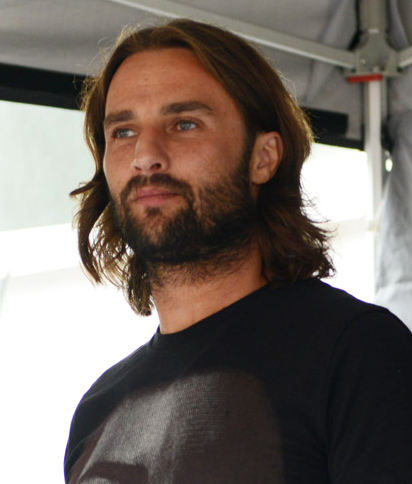
- Marek Uram in 2013
- Born: September 8, 1974 (age 52) Liptovský Mikuláš, Czechoslovakia
- Height: 5 ft 9 in (175 cm)
- Weight: 181 lb (82 kg; 12 st 13 lb)
- Position: Left wing
- Shot: Left
- Played for: HC Znojemšti Orli; HC Vítkovice Steel; HC Slovan Bratislava; MHC Martin; HC Nové Zámky; MsHK Žilina; HK 32 Liptovský Mikuláš
- National team: Slovakia
- Playing career: 1993–2018

Marek Uram (born September 8, 1974) is a Slovak former professional ice hockey player.

Uram started his hockey career in his hometown Liptovský Mikuláš, where he played for the local club HK 32. In the 1999/00 season he got traded to the Czech Extraliga, he ended up in the team HC Znojmo along fellow Slovak center Peter Pucher. During his career in Znojmo he was of the team's best scorers. In a disappointing 2005/06 season Uram got traded to HC Vítkovice. After the end of that season he signed a contract with HC Slovan Bratislava and won two Slovak Extraliga titles there.

Uram represented Slovakia at the 2002 World Championships, where Slovakia won a gold medal.

Medal record

Representing Slovakia

Ice hockey

World Championships
| Gold medal – first place | 2002 Sweden | |

== Career statistics ==
=== Regular season and playoffs ===
| | | | Regular season | | | | | Playoffs |
| Season | Team | League | GP | G | A | Pts | PIM | GP | G | A | Pts | PIM |
|---|---|---|---|---|---|---|---|---|---|---|---|---|
| 1993–94 | HK 32 Liptovský Mikuláš | SVK | 27 | 7 | 4 | 11 | — | — | — | — | — | — |
| 1994–95 | HK VTJ Marat Piešťany | SVK II | — | — | — | — | — | — | — | — | — | — |
| 1995–96 | HK 32 Liptovský Mikuláš | SVK | 34 | 15 | 14 | 29 | 6 | — | — | — | — | — |
| 1996–97 | HK 32 Liptovský Mikuláš | SVK | 48 | 28 | 29 | 57 | 16 | — | — | — | — | — |
| 1997–98 | HK 32 Liptovský Mikuláš | SVK | 39 | 15 | 19 | 34 | 10 | — | — | — | — | — |
| 1998–99 | HK 32 Liptovský Mikuláš | SVK | 46 | 28 | 27 | 55 | 40 | — | — | — | — | — |
| 1999–2000 | HK 32 Liptovský Mikuláš | SVK | 29 | 16 | 15 | 31 | 4 | — | — | — | — | — |
| 1999–2000 | HC Excalibur Znojemští Orli | ELH | 22 | 6 | 8 | 14 | 4 | — | — | — | — | — |
| 2000–01 | HC Excalibur Znojemští Orli | ELH | 52 | 26 | 31 | 57 | 14 | 7 | 1 | 1 | 2 | 4 |
| 2001–02 | HC JME Znojemští Orli | ELH | 52 | 27 | 24 | 51 | 26 | 7 | 1 | 5 | 6 | 2 |
| 2002–03 | HC JME Znojemští Orli | ELH | 52 | 21 | 22 | 43 | 26 | 6 | 3 | 3 | 6 | 2 |
| 2003–04 | HC JME Znojemští Orli | ELH | 46 | 25 | 24 | 49 | 16 | 7 | 4 | 6 | 10 | 4 |
| 2004–05 | HC JME Znojemští Orli | ELH | 52 | 20 | 21 | 41 | 16 | — | — | — | — | — |
| 2005–06 | HC JME Znojemští Orli | ELH | 44 | 7 | 22 | 29 | 42 | — | — | — | — | — |
| 2005–06 | HC Vítkovice Steel | ELH | 7 | 2 | 3 | 5 | 6 | 6 | 0 | 1 | 1 | 4 |
| 2006–07 | HC Slovan Bratislava | SVK | 53 | 31 | 32 | 63 | 60 | 14 | 12 | 9 | 21 | 16 |
| 2007–08 | HC Slovan Bratislava | SVK | 39 | 12 | 38 | 50 | 84 | 18 | 8 | 6 | 14 | 38 |
| 2008–09 | HC Slovan Bratislava | SVK | 52 | 21 | 26 | 47 | 50 | 12 | 6 | 7 | 13 | 2 |
| 2009–10 | MHC Martin | SVK | 46 | 14 | 35 | 49 | 34 | 8 | 0 | 3 | 3 | 2 |
| 2010–11 | MHC Mountfield Martin | SVK | 47 | 10 | 29 | 39 | 50 | — | — | — | — | — |
| 2010–11 | HC Slovan Bratislava | SVK | 5 | 1 | 4 | 5 | 4 | 6 | 1 | 0 | 1 | 0 |
| 2011–12 | MHk 32 Liptovský Mikuláš | SVK II | 3 | 3 | 1 | 4 | 0 | — | — | — | — | — |
| 2012–13 | Orli Znojmo | AUT | 38 | 10 | 19 | 29 | 10 | 3 | 0 | 0 | 0 | 2 |
| 2013–14 | HK Lokomotíva Nové Zámky | MOL | 28 | 9 | 21 | 30 | 8 | 5 | 2 | 3 | 5 | 4 |
| 2014–15 | HK Lokomotíva Nové Zámky | MOL | 22 | 10 | 23 | 33 | 46 | 9 | 6 | 5 | 11 | 12 |
| 2015–16 | MsHK DOXXbet Žilina | SVK | 11 | 3 | 2 | 5 | 2 | — | — | — | — | — |
| 2014–15 | HK Lokomotíva Nové Zámky | SVK III | 13 | 15 | 18 | 33 | 25 | — | — | — | — | — |
| 2015–16 | MHk 32 Liptovský Mikuláš | SVK II | 36 | 18 | 39 | 57 | 78 | 8 | 4 | 4 | 8 | 4 |
| 2016–17 | MHk 32 Liptovský Mikuláš | SVK | 47 | 10 | 26 | 36 | 18 | — | — | — | — | — |
| 2017–18 | MHk 32 Liptovský Mikuláš | SVK | 32 | 8 | 21 | 29 | 6 | — | — | — | — | — |
| SVK totals | | | 555 | 219 | 321 | 540 | 384 | 58 | 27 | 25 | 52 | 58 |
| ELH totals | | | 327 | 134 | 155 | 289 | 150 | 33 | 9 | 16 | 25 | 16 |

=== International ===
| Year | Team | Event | GP | G | A | Pts | PIM |
|---|---|---|---|---|---|---|---|
| 2002 | Slovakia | WC | 6 | 0 | 0 | 0 | 0 |
| 2007 | Slovakia | WC | 7 | 2 | 3 | 5 | 2 |
| Senior totals | | | 13 | 2 | 3 | 5 | 2 |
