= 1971–72 1. Slovenská národná hokejová liga season =

- League: (Czechoslovakia) 1. SNHL
- Sport: Ice hockey
- Number of teams: 12

Regular season
- League Champion: ŠK Liptovský Mikuláš

Seasons
- ← 1970–71 1972–73 →

The 1971–72 1. Slovenská národná hokejová liga season was the 3rd season of the 1. Slovenská národná hokejová liga, the second level of ice hockey in Czechoslovakia alongside the 1. Česká národní hokejová liga. 12 teams participated in the league, and ŠK Liptovský Mikuláš won the championship. TJ Slávia UK Bratislava and TJ VSŽ Košice B relegated.

== Regular season ==
=== Standings ===
Pos	Team	Pld	W	D	L	GF	GA	GD	Pts	Qualification
1	AŠD Dukla Trenčín	22	15	3	4	118	63	+55	33	Qualification to Group 1–6
2	ŠK Liptovský Mikuláš	22	15	2	5	94	60	+34	32	Qualification to Group 1–6
3	TJ Spartak BEZ Bratislava	22	12	3	7	81	85	−4	27	Qualification to Group 1–6
4	TJ Lokomotíva Bučina Zvolen	22	11	5	6	86	80	+6	27	Qualification to Group 1–6
5	TJ ZVL Žilina	22	11	3	8	103	79	+24	25	Qualification to Group 1–6
6	TJ Spartak SMZ Dubnica nad Váhom	22	11	2	9	75	78	−3	24	Qualification to Group 1–6
7	TJ Iskra Smrečina Banská Bystrica	22	10	3	9	98	79	+19	23	Qualification to Group 7–12
8	VTJ Dukla Trnava	22	9	4	9	61	59	+2	22	Qualification to Group 7–12
9	TJ LVS Poprad	22	8	4	10	70	81	−11	20	Qualification to Group 7–12
10	TJ Slovan CHZJD Bratislava B	22	8	2	12	65	101	−36	18	Qualification to Group 7–12
11	TJ VSŽ Košice B	22	4	2	16	65	118	−53	10	Qualification to Group 7–12
12	TJ Slávia UK Bratislava	22	1	1	20	54	127	−73	3	Qualification to Group 7–12

Source: 1. Slovenská národná hokejová liga

=== Group 1–6 ===
Pos	Team	Pld	W	D	L	GF	GA	GD	Pts	Qualification
1	ŠK Liptovský Mikuláš	32	20	4	8	136	94	+42	44	Champion
2	AŠD Dukla Trenčín	32	18	4	10	167	105	+62	40	
3	TJ Lokomotíva Bučina Zvolen	32	17	6	9	137	111	+26	40	
4	TJ Spartak BEZ Bratislava	32	16	5	11	120	107	+13	37	
5	TJ Spartak SMZ Dubnica nad Váhom	32	16	3	13	116	135	−19	35	
6	TJ ZVL Žilina	32	14	4	14	142	133	+9	32	

Source: 1. Slovenská národná hokejová liga

=== Group 7–12 ===
Pos	Team	Pld	W	D	L	GF	GA	GD	Pts	Qualification
7	VTJ Dukla Trnava	32	16	5	11	106	91	+15	37	
8	TJ Iskra Smrečina Banská Bystrica	32	13	6	13	145	117	+28	32	
9	TJ Slovan CHZJD Bratislava B	32	14	3	15	136	137	−1	31	
10	TJ LVS Poprad	32	12	6	14	102	112	−10	30	
11	TJ VSŽ Košice B	32	9	5	18	103	147	−44	23	Relegated
12	TJ Slávia UK Bratislava	32	1	1	30	82	203	−121	3	Relegated

Source: 1. Slovenská národná hokejová liga

== Qualification to 1972–73 Czechoslovak Extraliga ==
Pos	Team	Pld	W	D	L	GF	GA	GD	Pts	Qualification
1	TJ Škoda Plzeň	6	4	0	2	41	15	+26	8	Qualify
2	SK Slavia Praha	6	3	1	2	27	22	+5	7	
3	TJ VŽKG Ostrava	6	3	1	2	28	28	0	7	
4	ŠK Liptovský Mikuláš	6	1	0	5	10	41	−31	2	

Source: 1. Slovenská národná hokejová liga
