= 1973–74 1. Slovenská národná hokejová liga season =

- League: (Czechoslovakia) 1. SNHL
- Sport: Ice hockey
- Teams: 12

Regular season
- League Champion: ŠK Liptovský Mikuláš

Seasons
- 1972–73 1974–75

The 1973–74 1. Slovenská národná hokejová liga season was the 5th season of the 1. Slovenská národná hokejová liga, the second level of ice hockey in Czechoslovakia alongside the 1. Česká národní hokejová liga. 12 teams participated in the league, and ŠK Liptovský Mikuláš won the championship. TJ AC Nitra relegated and TJ Slovan CHZJD Bratislava B ceased its activities and disappeared.

== Regular season ==
=== Standings ===
Pos	Team	Pld	W	D	L	GF	GA	GD	Pts	Qualification
1	ŠK Liptovský Mikuláš	44	32	6	6	235	124	+111	70	Champion
2	TJ Lokomotíva Bučina Zvolen	44	30	3	11	255	131	+124	63	
3	TJ Spartak SMZ Dubnica nad Váhom	44	29	5	10	221	142	+79	63	
4	AŠD Dukla Trenčín	44	27	4	13	205	153	+52	58	
5	TJ ZVL Žilina	44	27	2	15	217	170	+47	56	
6	TJ LVS Poprad	44	17	6	21	164	190	−26	40	
7	TJ Iskra Smrečina Banská Bystrica	44	15	9	20	173	177	−4	39	
8	TJ Spartak BEZ Bratislava	44	15	5	24	144	166	−22	35	
9	TJ Slovan CHZJD Bratislava B	44	13	4	27	153	240	−87	30	
10	TJ Strojárne Martin	44	12	6	26	134	203	−69	30	
11	TJ ŽS Spišská Nová Ves	44	14	2	28	141	184	−43	30	
12	TJ AC Nitra	44	6	2	36	103	265	−162	14	Relegated

Source: 1. Slovenská národná hokejová liga
- The team TJ Slovan CHZJD Bratislava B ceased its activities and disappeared.

== Qualification to 1974–75 Czechoslovak Extraliga ==
TJ Gottwaldov	9–2	ŠK Liptovský Mikuláš

TJ Gottwaldov	8–2	ŠK Liptovský Mikuláš

ŠK Liptovský Mikuláš	5–4 OT	TJ Gottwaldov

ŠK Liptovský Mikuláš	2–8	TJ Gottwaldov

- TJ Gottwaldov – ŠK Liptovský Mikuláš 3–1 (9–2, 8–2, 4–5PP, 8–2)
- TJ Gottwaldov won the series 3–1 and qualified to 1974–75 Czechoslovak Extraliga.
