= 1972–73 1. Slovenská národná hokejová liga season =

- League: (Czechoslovakia) 1. SNHL
- Sport: Ice hockey
- Teams: 12

Regular season
- League Champion: TJ Lokomotíva Bučina Zvolen

Seasons
- 1971–72 1973–74

The 1972–73 1. Slovenská národná hokejová liga season was the 4th season of the 1. Slovenská národná hokejová liga, the second level of ice hockey in Czechoslovakia alongside the 1. Česká národní hokejová liga. 12 teams participated in the league, and TJ Lokomotíva Bučina Zvolen won the championship. TJ ZPA Prešov and VTJ Dukla Trnava relegated.

== Regular season ==
=== Standings ===
Pos	Team	Pld	W	D	L	GF	GA	GD	Pts	Qualification
1	TJ Lokomotíva Bučina Zvolen	22	14	4	4	98	67	+31	32	Qualification to Group 1–6
2	ŠK Liptovský Mikuláš	22	14	1	7	120	77	+43	29	Qualification to Group 1–6
3	TJ Spartak SMZ Dubnica nad Váhom	22	13	2	7	113	68	+45	28	Qualification to Group 1–6
4	AŠD Dukla Trenčín	22	12	1	9	90	64	+26	25	Qualification to Group 1–6
5	TJ Spartak BEZ Bratislava	22	12	1	9	96	80	+16	25	Qualification to Group 1–6
6	TJ Strojárne Martin	22	10	4	8	71	70	+1	24	Qualification to Group 1–6
7	TJ Iskra Smrečina Banská Bystrica	22	11	2	9	76	84	−8	24	Qualification to Group 7–12
8	TJ ZVL Žilina	22	9	3	10	93	80	+13	21	Qualification to Group 7–12
9	TJ LVS Poprad	22	10	1	11	73	85	−12	21	Qualification to Group 7–12
10	TJ Slovan CHZJD Bratislava B	22	8	1	13	74	108	−34	17	Qualification to Group 7–12
11	VTJ Dukla Trnava	22	5	1	16	63	118	−55	11	Qualification to Group 7–12
12	TJ ZPA Prešov	22	2	3	17	60	126	−66	7	Qualification to Group 7–12

Source: 1. Slovenská národná hokejová liga

=== Group 1–6 ===
Pos	Team	Pld	W	D	L	GF	GA	GD	Pts	Qualification
1	TJ Lokomotíva Bučina Zvolen	32	21	5	6	152	99	+53	47	Champion
2	ŠK Liptovský Mikuláš	32	19	2	11	164	114	+50	40	
3	TJ Spartak SMZ Dubnica nad Váhom	32	18	3	11	152	102	+50	39	
4	AŠD Dukla Trenčín	32	18	1	13	138	99	+39	37	
5	TJ Strojárne Martin	32	13	5	14	105	125	−20	31	
6	TJ Spartak BEZ Bratislava	32	14	1	17	123	133	−10	29	

Source: 1. Slovenská národná hokejová liga

=== Group 7–12 ===
Pos	Team	Pld	W	D	L	GF	GA	GD	Pts	Qualification
7	TJ Iskra Smrečina Banská Bystrica	32	18	2	12	130	127	+3	38	
8	TJ ZVL Žilina	32	16	5	11	150	112	+38	37	
9	TJ LVS Poprad	32	13	2	17	114	129	−15	28	
10	TJ Slovan CHZJD Bratislava B	32	11	2	19	114	161	−47	24	
11	TJ ZPA Prešov	32	7	4	21	105	176	−71	18	Relegated
12	VTJ Dukla Trnava	32	6	4	22	100	170	−70	16	Relegated

Source: 1. Slovenská národná hokejová liga

== Qualification to 1973–74 Czechoslovak Extraliga ==
Pos	Team	Pld	W	D	L	GF	GA	GD	Pts	Qualification
1	TJ VŽKG Ostrava	8	6	0	2	56	20	+36	12	Qualify
2	TJ Motor České Budějovice	8	5	2	1	36	22	+14	12	Qualify
3	TJ VTŽ Chomutov	8	3	3	2	32	30	+2	9	Qualify
4	TJ ZVVZ Milevsko	8	2	1	5	24	39	−15	5	
5	TJ Lokomotíva Bučina Zvolen	8	1	0	7	17	54	−37	2	

Source: 1. Slovenská národná hokejová liga
