= 1969–70 1. Slovenská národná hokejová liga season =

- League: (Czechoslovakia) 1. SNHL
- Sport: Ice hockey
- Number of teams: 8

Regular season
- League Champion: TJ LVS Poprad

Seasons
- 1970–71 →

The 1969–70 1. Slovenská národná hokejová liga season was the 1st season of the 1. Slovenská národná hokejová liga, the second level of ice hockey in Czechoslovakia alongside the 1. Česká národní hokejová liga. 8 teams participated in the league, and TJ LVS Poprad won the championship.

== Regular season ==
=== Standings ===
Pos	Team	Pld	W	D	L	GF	GA	GD	Pts	Qualification
1	TJ LVS Poprad	28	21	3	4	117	67	+50	45	Champion
2	ŠK Liptovský Mikuláš	28	16	4	8	104	81	+23	36	
3	VTJ Dukla Trenčín	28	13	2	13	121	99	+22	28	
4	TJ ZVL Žilina	28	11	6	11	119	117	+2	28	
5	TJ Slovan ChZJD Bratislava B	28	12	3	13	111	110	+1	27	
6	TJ Spartak BEZ Bratislava	28	9	4	15	109	113	−4	22	
7	TJ Iskra Smrečina Banská Bystrica	28	8	5	15	81	134	−53	21	
8	VTJ Dukla Trnava	28	7	3	18	97	138	−41	17	

Source: 1. Slovenská národná hokejová liga

== Qualification to 1970–71 Czechoslovak Extraliga ==
Pos	Team	Pld	W	D	L	GF	GA	GD	Pts	Qualification
1	TJ Motor České Budějovice	6	5	1	0	31	9	+22	11	Qualify
2	TJ Baník ČSA Karviná	6	2	2	2	22	22	0	6	
3	VTJ Dukla Písek	6	2	1	3	19	21	−2	5	
4	TJ LVS Poprad	6	1	0	5	11	31	−20	2	

Source: 1. Slovenská národná hokejová liga
