= Viktor Fekiač =

Slovak ice hockey centre

- Born: 14 February 1993 (age 32); Zvolen, Slovakia
- Height: 6 ft 3 in (191 cm)
- Weight: 207 lb (94 kg; 14 st 11 lb)
- Position: Centre
- Shoots: Right
- Slovak.1 team Former teams: HK MŠK Indian Žiar nad Hronom; HKM Zvolen; HK Orange 20; HC 07 Detva; HC 21 Prešov
- Playing career: 2011–present

Viktor Fekiač (born 14 February 1993) is a Slovak professional ice hockey centre playing for HK MŠK Indian Žiar nad Hronom of the Slovenská hokejová liga.

== Career ==
Fekiač previously played for HKM Zvolen, making his professional debut with the team during the 2012–13 Tipsport Liga playoffs. He split his time between Zvolen and HC 07 Detva before becoming a permanent member of Detva on May 22, 2018.

== Personal life ==
Fekiač is the older brother of Frederik Fekiač and the two has often played alongside each other during their careers.

== Career statistics ==
=== Regular season and playoffs ===
			Regular season					Playoffs
Season	Team	League	GP	G	A	Pts	PIM	GP	G	A	Pts	PIM
