= Adam Foote =

Canadian ice hockey player and coach

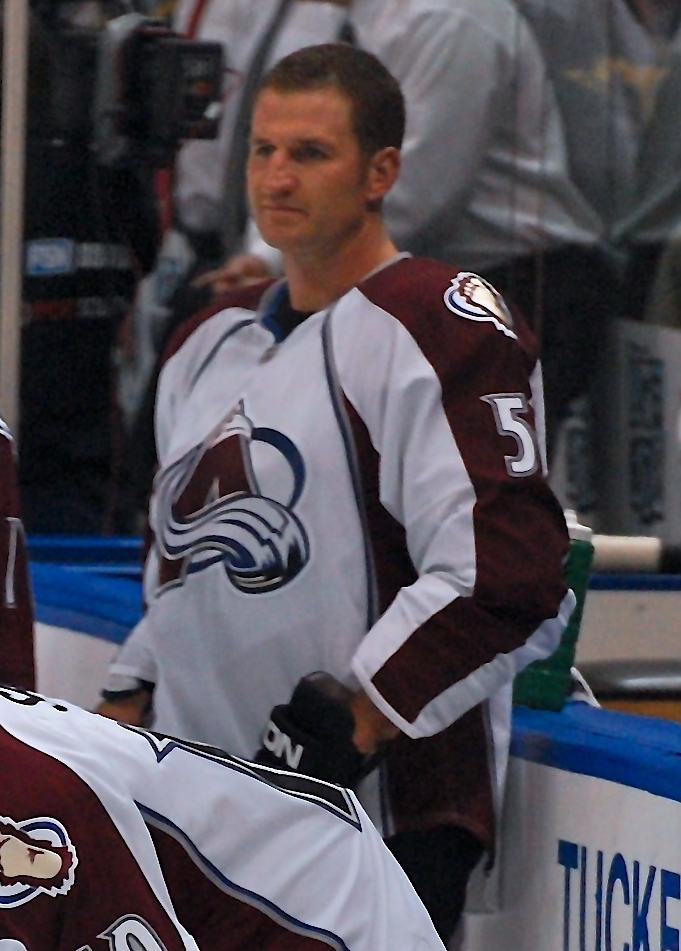
- Foote with the Colorado Avalanche in 2008
- Born: July 10, 1971 (age 55) Toronto, Ontario, Canada
- Height: 6 ft 2 in (188 cm)
- Weight: 220 lb (100 kg; 15 st 10 lb)
- Position: Defence
- Shot: Right
- Played for: Quebec Nordiques; Colorado Avalanche; Columbus Blue Jackets
- Coached for: Vancouver Canucks
- National team: Canada
- NHL draft: 22nd overall, 1989; Quebec Nordiques
- Playing career: 1992–2011
- Coaching career: 2018–present

Adam David Vernon Foote (born July 10, 1971) is a Canadian professional ice hockey coach and former player. As a player, he was best known for his physical presence and gritty play as a stay-at-home defenceman. He is an assistant coach for the Utah Mammoth. He was previously a coach with the Vancouver Canucks of the National Hockey League (NHL), serving initially as an assistant coach starting in 2023 and subsequently for the 2025–26 season as the team's head coach. He was also the former head coach of the Kelowna Rockets of the Western Hockey League (WHL).

A product of the Ontario Hockey League (OHL)'s Sault Ste. Marie Greyhounds, Foote was drafted 22nd overall in the 1989 NHL entry draft by the Quebec Nordiques. He began his National Hockey League (NHL) career with the Nordiques in 1991–92 before the franchise relocated to Colorado, where they played as the Avalanche; he won two Stanley Cups with the team in 1996 and 2001. In 2005, Foote signed with the Columbus Blue Jackets, where he served as team captain for three seasons. He was traded back to the Avalanche in 2008, where he would eventually complete his playing career. At the end of his playing career in 2011, Foote was the last active NHL player to have played for the Nordiques.

Internationally, Foote won a gold medal in 2002 Winter Olympics and a World Cup championship in 2004 with Canada.

Foote is the father of NHL player Nolan Foote and former NHL player Cal Foote.

== Playing career ==
=== Minor/Junior ===
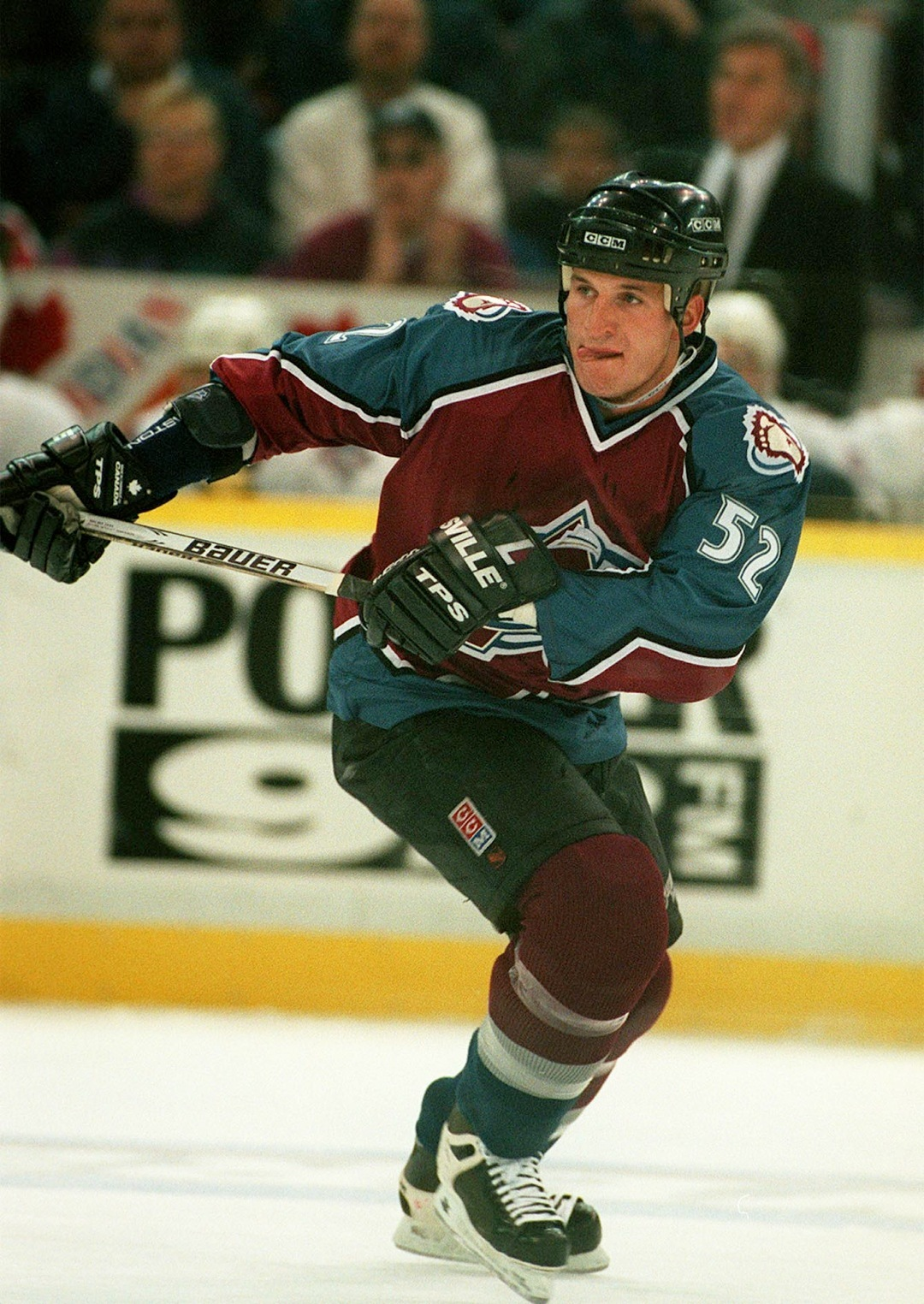
Adam Foote (1997).

Foote grew up playing hockey for the Brooklin-Whitby Minor Hockey Association (OMHA). He was a teammate of future NHLer Keith Primeau for several years, leading their teams to several OMHA "AA" Championships in the early 1980s. After a successful midget season with Brooklin-Whitby's AA team, Foote was a second-round underage choice, 21st overall, of the Sault Ste. Marie Greyhounds in the 1988 OHL Priority Selection. Foote went on to play three OHL seasons with the Greyhounds, winning a J. Ross Robertson Cup and appearing in the Memorial Cup in his final season under future NHL head coach Ted Nolan.

=== Professional ===
Foote was selected 22nd overall by the Quebec Nordiques in the 1989 NHL entry draft. He played for Quebec for four seasons until the franchise moved to Colorado to become the Avalanche in 1995–96. Foote won his first of two Stanley Cups with the Avalanche that year, sweeping the Florida Panthers in the Final. Five years later, Foote helped the Avalanche to a second Stanley Cup championship in 2001, defeating the New Jersey Devils in seven games.

The following season, in 2001–02, Foote recorded a career-high 22 assists in the regular season before missing out on his second straight Stanley Cup Finals appearance with the Avalanche, losing in seven games to the Detroit Red Wings in the Western Conference Finals. In 2002–03, Foote had another career-year offensively, scoring personal bests of 11 goals and 31 points. After a 30-point campaign in 2003–04, he remained inactive in 2004–05 due to the NHL lockout.

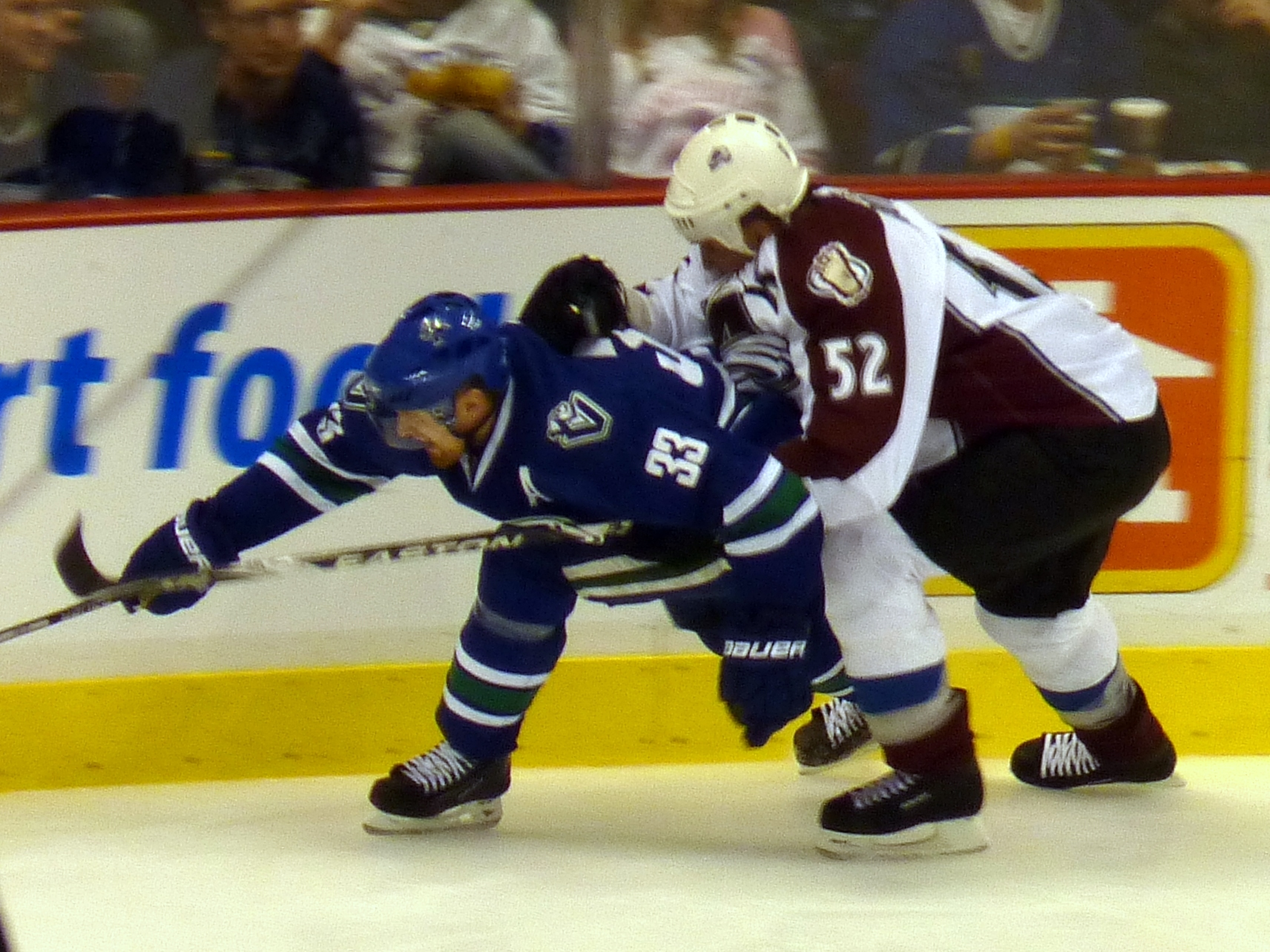
Foote defending against the Vancouver Canucks' Henrik Sedin in 2010

When NHL play was set to resume in 2005–06, Foote parted ways with the Avalanche franchise after 13 seasons, signing a three-year contract worth $13.5 million with the Columbus Blue Jackets on August 1, 2005. He was immediately named an alternate captain for the upcoming season, but was assigned the Blue Jackets' captaincy in December 2005 when defenceman Luke Richardson stepped down from the position. He became the fourth captain in franchise history.

Three seasons later, with his contract set to expire, Foote was traded from the Blue Jackets back to the Colorado Avalanche in exchange for two conditional draft picks on February 26, 2008. The trade occurred amid speculation that the Blue Jackets were trying to re-sign Foote to keep him in Columbus, but could not meet Foote's asking price. Later that night, he arrived in Calgary during the first period to play against the Flames. Foote managed one goal and 15 assists for a total of 16 points in 75 games with the Avs and Blue Jackets combined.

On June 30, 2008, Foote agreed to re-sign with the Avalanche with a two-year $6 million deal at $3 million per season. His first full season back in Colorado was cut short by injury and he managed just 42 games. Further major injuries to key players in the lineup resulted in the Avalanche finishing in last place in the Western Conference. The following off-season, long-time Avalanche captain Joe Sakic announced his retirement. As training camp was set to begin for the 2009–10 season, Foote was named Sakic's successor on September 11, 2009, becoming the eighth captain in franchise history (including the Nordiques) and just the second in Avalanche history.

On May 25, 2010, the Avalanche re-signed Foote to a one-year contract extension for the 2010–11 season worth approximately $1 million.

On April 10, 2011, Foote played his last game with the Avalanche, winning 4–3 in overtime against the Edmonton Oilers during the season finale. He was awarded first star of the game. Foote was the last former Nordique to be active in the NHL. On November 2, 2013, Foote had his number 52 jersey retired by the Avalanche, joining elite company in Ray Bourque, Patrick Roy, Joe Sakic and Peter Forsberg in sharing the honour.

== Coaching career ==
After his playing career, Foote was hired by his former club the Colorado Avalanche as a defensive coach from 2011 to 2017. On October 23, 2018, It was announced that Foote had been named the head coach for the Kelowna Rockets of the Western Hockey League. He was subsequently fired as head coach by the Rockets in February 2020. On January 22, 2023, it was announced that Foote had been hired as an assistant coach for the Vancouver Canucks upon the mid season hiring of new head coach Rick Tocchet. Following Tocchet's departure after the 2024–25 season, Foote was promoted to the position of head coach on May 14, 2025. Foote led the Canucks through a very poor regular season, with their 25–49–8 record landing the team in last place among league standings at the season's end. The team had finished with a worse point-percentage only twice in franchise history. On May 19, 2026, less than a week past the one-year mark of his promotion, the Canucks fired Foote.

== Personal life ==
Foote played minor hockey in Whitby, Ontario, and lived in Newcastle, Ontario, on the north shore of Lake Ontario. He lived there during the late 1990s before relocating to Whitby. Foote and his wife Jennifer have two sons – Callan, who was born prematurely on December 13, 1998, and Nolan, born November 29, 2000. He eventually joined the team that both his sons played for, the Western Hockey League's Kelowna Rockets, as head coach from October 2018 to February 2020. His youngest son, Nolan was team captain at the time of his departure.

== International play ==
Medal record

Men's ice hockey

Representing Canada

Winter Olympics
Gold medal – first place	2002 Salt Lake City	

World Cup of Hockey
Gold medal – first place	2004 Canada	
Silver medal – second place	1996 Canada	

Foote debuted for Canada at the inaugural World Cup in 1996, scoring one goal as Canada finished as runner-up to the United States. Two years later, Foote was named to Canada for the 1998 Winter Olympics in Nagano, Japan. The tournament marked the first time NHL players were allowed to participate in the Olympics. Foote managed an assist in six games as Canada finished in fourth place, losing to the Czech Republic in the semi-finals, then Finland in the bronze medal game. At the next Winter Olympics in 2002, Foote helped Canada end a 50-year gold medal drought in the ice hockey tournament by defeating the United States in the final. He won another championship two years later and was even selected to the Tournament All-Star Team in his second World Cup in 2004, defeating Finland in the final. Selected to play in his third Olympics at the 2006 Games in Turin, Italy, Canada finished a disappointing seventh place while attempting to defend their gold medal from the prior tournament.

== Career statistics ==
=== Regular season and playoffs ===
			Regular season					Playoffs
Season	Team	League	GP	G	A	Pts	PIM	GP	G	A	Pts	PIM
1987–88	Whitby	OMHA	65	25	43	68	108	—	—	—	—	—
1988–89	Sault Ste. Marie Greyhounds	OHL	66	7	31	38	120	—	—	—	—	—
1989–90	Sault Ste. Marie Greyhounds	OHL	61	12	43	55	199	—	—	—	—	—
1990–91	Sault Ste. Marie Greyhounds	OHL	59	18	51	69	93	14	5	12	17	28
1991–92	Halifax Citadels	AHL	6	0	1	1	2	—	—	—	—	—
1991–92	Quebec Nordiques	NHL	46	2	5	7	44	—	—	—	—	—
1992–93	Quebec Nordiques	NHL	81	4	12	16	168	6	0	1	1	2
1993–94	Quebec Nordiques	NHL	45	2	6	8	67	—	—	—	—	—
1994–95	Quebec Nordiques	NHL	35	0	7	7	52	6	0	1	1	14
1995–96	Colorado Avalanche	NHL	73	5	11	16	88	22	1	3	4	36
1996–97	Colorado Avalanche	NHL	78	2	19	21	135	17	0	4	4	62
1997–98	Colorado Avalanche	NHL	77	3	14	17	124	7	0	0	0	23
1998–99	Colorado Avalanche	NHL	64	5	16	21	92	19	2	3	5	24
1999–00	Colorado Avalanche	NHL	59	5	13	18	98	16	0	7	7	28
2000–01	Colorado Avalanche	NHL	35	3	12	15	42	23	3	4	7	47
2001–02	Colorado Avalanche	NHL	55	5	22	27	55	21	1	6	7	28
2002–03	Colorado Avalanche	NHL	78	11	20	31	88	6	0	1	1	8
2003–04	Colorado Avalanche	NHL	73	8	22	30	87	11	0	4	4	10
2005–06	Columbus Blue Jackets	NHL	65	6	16	22	89	—	—	—	—	—
2006–07	Columbus Blue Jackets	NHL	59	3	9	12	71	—	—	—	—	—
2007–08	Columbus Blue Jackets	NHL	63	1	14	15	95	—	—	—	—	—
2007–08	Colorado Avalanche	NHL	12	0	1	1	12	10	0	0	0	6
2008–09	Colorado Avalanche	NHL	42	1	6	7	30	—	—	—	—	—
2009–10	Colorado Avalanche	NHL	67	0	9	9	64	6	0	1	1	10
2010–11	Colorado Avalanche	NHL	47	0	8	8	33	—	—	—	—	—
NHL totals			1,154	66	242	308	1,534	170	7	35	42	298

=== International ===
Year	Team	Event	Result	GP	G	A	Pts	PIM
1996	Canada	WCH	2nd place, silver medalist(s)	8	1	0	1	16
1998	Canada	Oly	4th	6	0	1	1	4
2002	Canada	Oly	1st place, gold medalist(s)	6	1	0	1	2
2004	Canada	WCH	1st place, gold medalist(s)	6	0	3	3	0
2006	Canada	Oly	7th	6	0	1	1	6
Senior totals				32	2	5	7	28

== Head coaching record ==
Team	Year	Regular season						Postseason			
Team	Year	G	W	L	OTL	Pts	Finish	W	L	Win %	Result
KEL	2019–20	63	29	28	6	64	3rd in BC Division	—	—	—	Missed playoffs
VAN	2025–26	82	25	49	8	58	8th in Pacific	—	—	—	Missed playoffs
NHL Total		82	25	49	8			—	—	—	

== Awards and honours ==
- Named to the OHL First All-Star team in 1990–91.
- Won 2 Stanley Cups with the Colorado Avalanche in 1996 and 2001.
- Won an Olympic gold medal with Canada in 2002.
- Won the World Cup of Hockey with Canada in 2004.
- Had his number 5 jersey retired by the Sault Ste. Marie Greyhounds on March 15, 2012.
- Had his number 52 jersey retired by the Colorado Avalanche on November 2, 2013.

== See also ==
- List of NHL players with 1,000 games played

Sporting positions
Preceded by Luke Richardson	Columbus Blue Jackets captain 2005–2008	Succeeded by Rick Nash
Preceded by Joe Sakic	Colorado Avalanche captain 2009–2011	Succeeded by Milan Hejduk
Preceded by Rick Tocchet	Head coach of the Vancouver Canucks; 2025–2026	Succeeded by Manny Malhotra
