= Jakub Sukeľ =

Slovak ice hockey player

- Born: 23 January 1996 (age 30) Liptovský Mikuláš, Slovakia
- Height: 5 ft 9 in (175 cm)
- Weight: 172 lb (78 kg; 12 st 4 lb)
- Position: Right winger
- Shoots: Left
- Slovak team Former teams: MHk 32 Liptovský Mikuláš; HC '05 Banská Bystrica; HK Orange 20; HC Košice; HC Slovan Bratislava
- Playing career: 2015–present

Jakub Sukeľ (born 23 January 1996) is a Slovak professional ice hockey right winger for MHk 32 Liptovský Mikuláš of the Slovak Extraliga. He has played a total of 203 games in the Slovak Extraliga up to the end of the 2019–20 season. He is twin brother of Matúš Sukeľ.

Sukeľ began his professional career with MHk 32 Liptovský Mikuláš in 2015. He remained with the team until January 14, 2020, when he signed for HC Košice. On July 27, 2020, he joined HC Slovan Bratislava on a two-year contract.

== Career statistics ==
=== Regular season and playoffs ===
			Regular season					Playoffs
Season	Team	League	GP	G	A	Pts	PIM	GP	G	A	Pts	PIM

== Awards and honors ==
Award	Year
Slovak
Champion	2022
