= Alexander Volkov (ice hockey) =

Russian ice hockey player

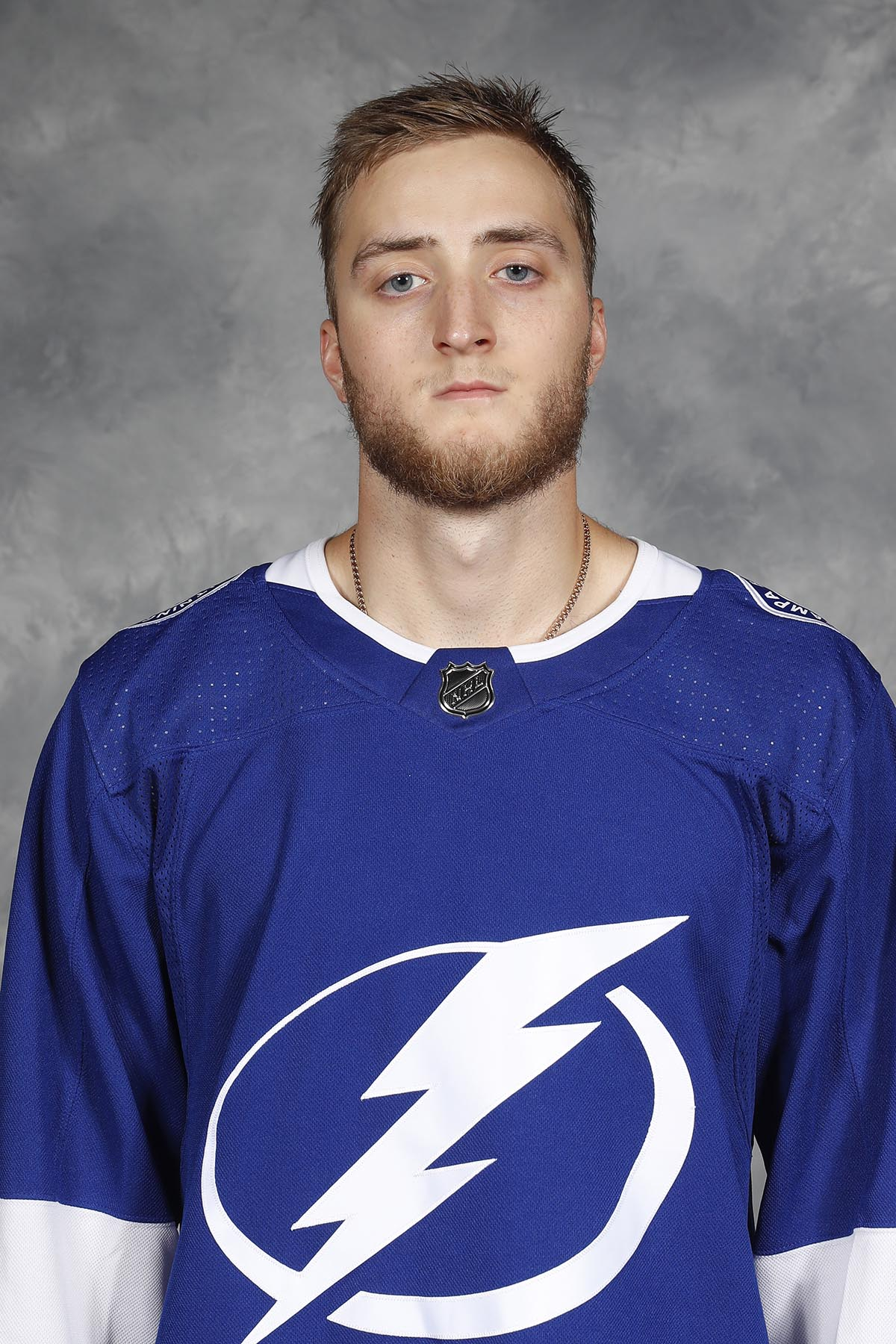
- Volkov with the Tampa Bay Lightning in 2019
- Born: 2 August 1997 (age 29) Moscow, Russia
- Height: 6 ft 1 in (185 cm)
- Weight: 185 lb (84 kg; 13 st 3 lb)
- Position: Left wing
- Shoots: Left
- KHL team Former teams: Avangard Omsk; Tampa Bay Lightning; Anaheim Ducks; SKA Saint Petersburg; Dinamo Minsk
- NHL draft: 48th overall, 2017; Tampa Bay Lightning
- Playing career: 2016–present

Alexander Vladimirovich Volkov (Russian: Александр Владимирович Волков; born 2 August 1997) is a Russian professional ice hockey winger for Avangard Omsk of the Kontinental Hockey League (KHL). He was selected by the Tampa Bay Lightning in the second round (48th overall) of the 2017 NHL entry draft. Volkov won the Stanley Cup as a member of the Lightning in 2020.

== Playing career ==
=== Juniors ===
Volkov developed as junior age player in the SKA Saint Petersburg farm system. In his second season Volkov helped SKA-1946 of the MHL to capture the Kharlamov Cup as league champion. Volkov split his final season of draft eligibility between playing for the SKA-1946 Saint Petersburg and SKA-Neva of the VHL. Volkov skated in 128 games within the SKA system, recording 33 goals and 61 points. At the end of the season Volkov's contract ended with SKA St. Petersburg. Volkov was drafted 48th overall in the 2017 NHL entry draft by the Tampa Bay Lightning. On 29 June 2017, Volkov signed a three-year entry-level contract with the Lightning.

=== Professional ===
On 29 October 2019, Volkov was informed by Lightning general manager Julien BriseBois that he would be making his NHL debut the following night. The Lightning formally announced Volkov's recall from the Syracuse Crunch on 30 October. Volkov made his NHL debut that night in a 7–6 win over the New Jersey Devils at the Prudential Center. On 14 January 2020, Volkov recorded his first career NHL assist and point in a 4–3 shootout against the Los Angeles Kings at Amalie Arena.

Volkov was one of the eight players called up to the Lightning for their training camp prior to the 2020 Stanley Cup playoffs. Volkov made his Stanley Cup playoff debut in game six of the 2020 Stanley Cup Final, drawing a tripping penalty which led to the Stanley Cup-winning power play goal, as the Lightning would win game six and defeat the Dallas Stars in 6 games, winning the Stanley Cup.

In the following pandemic-delayed 2020–21 season, Volkov remained on the Lightning's opening night roster and on 13 February 2021, Volkov scored his first career NHL goal which came against the Florida Panthers. After posting three goals and five points through 19 games with the Lightning, on 24 March, Volkov was traded to the Anaheim Ducks in exchange for forward Antoine Morand and a conditional seventh-round pick in the 2023 NHL Entry Draft.

On 26 October 2021, Volkov was placed on unconditional waivers by the Ducks, and he then signed a four-year contract with SKA Saint Petersburg of the Kontinental Hockey League (KHL) on 27 October.

Following two seasons within SKA Saint Petersburg, Volkov was traded to Belarusian KHL club, HC Dinamo Minsk, on 17 May 2023.

== Career statistics ==
=== Regular season and playoffs ===
			Regular season					Playoffs
Season	Team	League	GP	G	A	Pts	PIM	GP	G	A	Pts	PIM
2013–14	SKA-1946	MHL	16	2	2	4	6	5	0	0	0	0
2014–15	SKA-1946	MHL	54	11	8	19	36	17	1	1	2	4
2015–16	SKA-1946	MHL	42	16	11	27	34	3	0	0	0	0
2016–17	SKA-1946	MHL	16	6	5	11	12	4	2	2	4	2
2016–17	SKA-Neva	VHL	15	3	0	3	4	8	1	2	3	6
2017–18	Syracuse Crunch	AHL	75	23	22	45	63	7	3	3	6	8
2018–19	Syracuse Crunch	AHL	74	23	25	48	61	4	1	0	1	2
2019–20	Syracuse Crunch	AHL	46	9	21	30	26	—	—	—	—	—
2019–20	Tampa Bay Lightning	NHL	9	0	1	1	6	1	0	0	0	0
2020–21	Tampa Bay Lightning	NHL	19	3	2	5	4	—	—	—	—	—
2020–21	Anaheim Ducks	NHL	18	4	4	8	2	—	—	—	—	—
2021–22	San Diego Gulls	AHL	2	0	1	1	2	—	—	—	—	—
2021–22	SKA Saint Petersburg	KHL	19	1	3	4	2	16	3	2	5	6
2022–23	SKA Saint Petersburg	KHL	58	14	11	25	16	11	3	2	5	8
2023–24	Dinamo Minsk	KHL	68	19	23	42	56	6	1	1	2	2
2024–25	Dinamo Minsk	KHL	67	18	30	48	44	7	3	2	5	2
2025–26	Avangard Omsk	KHL	45	10	12	22	16	12	3	5	8	6
NHL totals			46	7	7	14	12	1	0	0	0	0
KHL totals			257	62	79	141	134	52	13	12	25	24

=== International ===
Year	Team	Event	Result	GP	G	A	Pts	PIM
2014	Russia	IH18	5th	4	0	0	0	2
Junior totals				4	0	0	0	2

== Awards and honors ==
Award	Year
MHL
Kharlamov Cup	2015
NHL
Stanley Cup champion	2020
