= Cal Foote =

Canadian ice hockey player (born 1998)

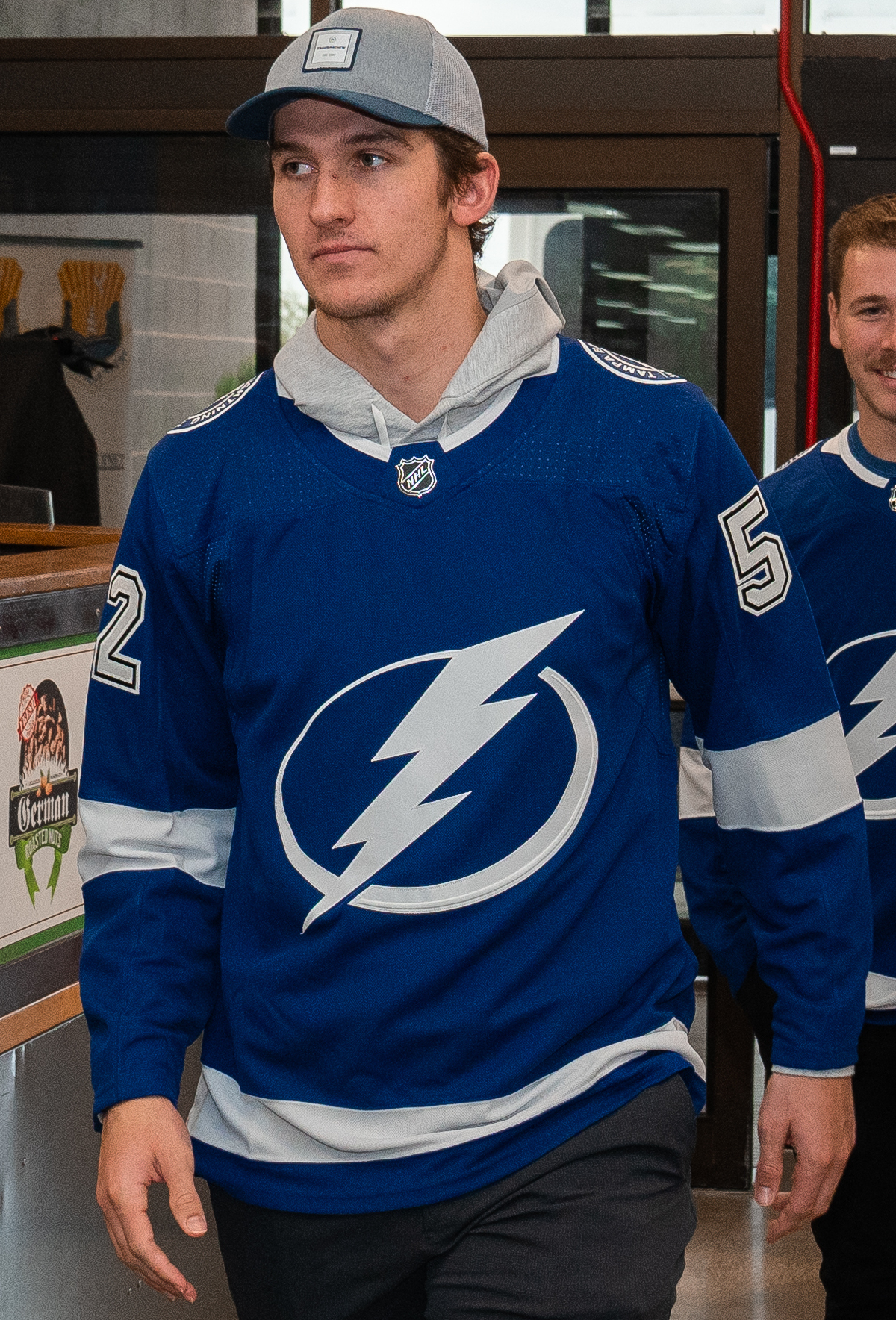
- Foote with the Tampa Bay Lightning in 2022
- Born: December 13, 1998 (age 27) Englewood, Colorado, U.S.
- Height: 6 ft 3 in (191 cm)
- Weight: 212 lb (96 kg; 15 st 2 lb)
- Position: Defence
- Shoots: Right
- team Former teams: Free agent Tampa Bay Lightning; Nashville Predators; New Jersey Devils; MHk 32 Liptovský Mikuláš
- NHL draft: 14th overall, 2017; Tampa Bay Lightning
- Playing career: 2018–present

Callan Hayden Foote (born December 13, 1998) is an American-born Canadian professional ice hockey player who is a defenceman and an unrestricted free agent. He most recently played for the Chicago Wolves of the American Hockey League (AHL). Foote was selected 14th overall in the 2017 NHL entry draft by the Tampa Bay Lightning. Foote won the Stanley Cup with the Lightning in 2021.

In 2025, Foote was legally acquitted after being charged in the 2018 Hockey Canada controversy and sexual assault.

== Playing career ==
=== Junior ===
Foote was drafted in the second-round by the Kelowna Rockets of the Western Hockey League (WHL) in the 2013 WHL bantam draft. After being drafted by Kelowna, Foote played two seasons with the Colorado Thunderbirds under-16 team in the Tier 1 Elite Hockey League before making his WHL debut in the 2015–16 season. In his draft year, Foote posted 57 points in 71 games for the Kelowna Rockets. On June 23, 2017, the Tampa Bay Lightning selected Foote in the first round of the 2017 NHL entry draft with the 14th overall pick. Foote was the eighth Kelowna Rockets player in team history to be drafted in the first round.

On September 22, 2017, Foote was named as the 23rd captain in the Kelowna Rockets history. On April 1, 2018, Foote was signed to a three-year, entry-level contract by the Tampa Bay Lightning.

=== Professional ===
After signing his entry-level contract, Foote joined the Syracuse Crunch, the American Hockey League (AHL) affiliate of the Lightning. On April 6, 2018, Foote made his professional ice hockey debut in a 4–3 Crunch shootout loss to the Binghamton Devils. Foote scored the first goal of the game on his first shot. In his first full professional season, Foote scored 10 goals and 21 assists, for a total of 31 points. In four games in the 2019 Calder Cup playoffs, he went scoreless.

Foote was one of the eight players called up to the Lightning for their training camp prior to the 2020 Stanley Cup playoffs. In the 2020–21 season, on January 13, 2021, Foote made his NHL debut in a 5–1 Lightning win in the season opener against the Chicago Blackhawks. On January 30, Foote scored his first NHL goal and point against Pekka Rinne of the Nashville Predators. On March 25, Foote recorded his first career NHL assist.

During his third season with the Lightning, his first full-time season in the NHL in 2022–23, Foote added one goal and two assists through 26 regular season games before he was traded by Tampa Bay, along with five future draft picks, to the Nashville Predators in exchange for Tanner Jeannot on February 26, 2023. He finished the season playing in 24 games with Nashville, scoring one goal and three points.

Following his brief stint with the Predators, Foote was signed by the New Jersey Devils, reuniting with his brother Nolan by agreeing to a one-year, two-way contract on August 9, 2023. He failed to make the team, and was placed on waivers on October 4. After going unclaimed, he was assigned to New Jersey's AHL affiliate, the Utica Comets, to start the 2023–24 season. He was recalled by New Jersey on October 23 and remained on the Devils' roster for two weeks without ever appearing, before being return to the AHL on November 10. He was recalled again on January 9, 2024 after Jonas Siegenthaler was placed on injured reserve.

On January 24, the Devils announced that Foote and forward Michael McLeod were granted indefinite leaves of absence from the team. In the offseason, Foote was a restricted free agent. The Devils did not give him a qualifying offer, making him an unrestricted free agent.

On September 18, 2024, Foote signed a one-year contract with MHk 32 Liptovský Mikuláš of the Slovak Extraliga. Early in the 2024–25 season, Foote received a one-game suspension for an illegal check to the head committed on September 22 in just the second game of the season, against HK Poprad.

On September 11, 2025, the NHL announced Foote would be eligible to sign a contract on October 15, and would be eligible to return to play on December 1. On December 1, 2025, Foote signed a one-year AHL-only contract with the Chicago Wolves, the American Hockey League (AHL) affiliate of the Carolina Hurricanes. The Wolves governor and chairman stated that it was "one-hundred percent not a Chicago Wolves signing... the signing is out of our control" as the Hurricanes have had full control over all signings to the AHL team since 2024.

On July 28, 2026, Foote signed a one-year contract with Färjestad BK of the Swedish Hockey League (SHL). Two days later, on July 30, 2026, the team announced that they had rescinded the contract, after fan objections due to Foote's sexual assault accusation, making Foote a free agent again.

== International play ==
Medal record

Representing Canada

Men's ice hockey

World Junior Championships
Gold medal – first place	2018 Canada	

Although Foote was born and raised in Colorado he decided to represent his father's country in international hockey. On December 6, 2017, Foote was named to Canada national junior team's selection camp roster for the 2018 World Junior Ice Hockey Championships. On January 5, 2018, Foote won a gold medal with Canada national junior team.

On March 27, 2023, as part of the development of the sexual assault scandal, Hockey Canada announced that every member of Canada's 2018 World Junior team would be ineligible for all international competitions until investigations were complete. On August 12, 2026, Hockey Canada updated its suspensions and stated that due to a breach of conduct, Foote would be suspended from international competitions through November 10, 2026.

== Personal life ==
Foote is the son of former NHL defenceman Adam Foote. He was drafted eight picks higher than his father was in 1989, when his father was drafted 22nd overall by the Quebec Nordiques. Foote's younger brother Nolan was his teammate when he played in Kelowna. Nolan was drafted 27th overall in the 2019 NHL entry draft by the Tampa Bay Lightning.

On January 30, 2024, Foote, Devils teammate Michael McLeod, and three other NHL players were charged with sexual assault over a 2018 alleged assault in London, Ontario. On February 5, 2024, the London Police Service announced that Foote had been charged with one count of sexual assault. The trial began in April 2025, trial proceedings were declared a mistrial twice, before the jury was dismissed and the justice adjudicated the case herself. He was acquitted on July 24, 2025, of the charges laid against him.

== Career statistics ==
=== Regular season and playoffs ===
			Regular season					Playoffs
Season	Team	League	GP	G	A	Pts	PIM	GP	G	A	Pts	PIM
2014–15	Omaha Lancers	USHL	2	0	1	1	0	—	—	—	—	—
2015–16	Kelowna Rockets	WHL	71	8	28	36	36	18	1	8	9	12
2016–17	Kelowna Rockets	WHL	71	6	51	57	41	14	1	6	7	24
2017–18	Kelowna Rockets	WHL	60	19	51	70	46	4	1	5	6	4
2017–18	Syracuse Crunch	AHL	6	1	0	1	4	7	1	1	2	0
2018–19	Syracuse Crunch	AHL	76	10	21	31	53	4	0	0	0	0
2019–20	Syracuse Crunch	AHL	62	6	22	28	38	—	—	—	—	—
2020–21	Syracuse Crunch	AHL	6	1	3	4	4	—	—	—	—	—
2020–21	Tampa Bay Lightning	NHL	35	1	2	3	29	—	—	—	—	—
2021–22	Syracuse Crunch	AHL	5	0	0	0	0	—	—	—	—	—
2021–22	Tampa Bay Lightning	NHL	56	2	7	9	29	13	0	2	2	6
2022–23	Tampa Bay Lightning	NHL	26	1	2	3	28	—	—	—	—	—
2022–23	Nashville Predators	NHL	24	1	3	4	35	—	—	—	—	—
2023–24	Utica Comets	AHL	24	2	7	9	17	—	—	—	—	—
2023–24	New Jersey Devils	NHL	4	0	1	1	16	—	—	—	—	—
2024–25	MHk 32 Liptovský Mikuláš	Slovak	38	3	27	30	35	—	—	—	—	—
2025–26	Chicago Wolves	AHL	48	4	14	18	20	21	3	8	11	30
NHL totals			145	5	15	20	137	13	0	2	2	6

=== International ===
Year	Team	Event	Result	GP	G	A	Pts	PIM
2018	Canada	WJC	1st place, gold medalist(s)	7	0	3	3	0
Junior totals				7	0	3	3	0

== Awards and honours ==
Award	Year	Ref
NHL
Stanley Cup champion	2021	

Awards and achievements
Preceded by Brett Howden	Tampa Bay Lightning first-round draft pick 2017	Succeeded by Nolan Foote
