= Frederik Fekiač =

Slovak ice hockey defenceman

- Born: June 7, 1995 (age 29); Zvolen, Slovakia
- Height: 5 ft 9 in (175 cm)
- Weight: 187 lb (85 kg; 13 st 5 lb)
- Position: Defence
- Shoots: Right
- Slovak team Former teams: HC 21 Prešov; HKM Zvolen; HK Orange 20; HC 07 Detva
- Playing career: 2012–present

Frederik Fekiač (born June 7, 1995) is a Slovak professional ice hockey defenceman currently playing for HC 21 Prešov of the Slovak Extraliga.

Fekiač previously played for HKm Zvolen, making his professional debut with the team during the 2012–13 season. He would divide his team between Zvolen and HC 07 Detva between 2015 and 2017 before joining Detva permanently in 2017.

He is the younger brother of centre Viktor Fekiač and the two have often been teammates throughout their careers.

== Career statistics ==
=== Regular season and playoffs ===
			Regular season					Playoffs
Season	Team	League	GP	G	A	Pts	PIM	GP	G	A	Pts	PIM
