= HK 32 Liptovský Mikuláš =

Ice hockey team

- Nickname: Liptáci
- City: Liptovský Mikuláš, Slovakia
- League: Slovak Extraliga
- Founded: 1932
- Home arena: Liptovský Mikuláš Ice Stadium (capacity 3,680)
- Colours: Red, white, blue
- Owner(s): R-STAV SK s.r.o. (Róbert Ľupták, chairman)
- Head coach: Aleš Totter
- Captain: Jakub Sukeľ
- Website: mhk32lm.sk

HK 32 Liptovský Mikuláš is a professional ice hockey team in the Slovak Extraliga, top hockey tier in Slovakia. Their home town is Liptovský Mikuláš in Slovakia. The team plays their home games at Liptovský Mikuláš Ice Stadium.

== History ==
The club was founded in 1932. Mikuláš won the 1. SNHL first time in the 1972, but they won this league two more times in the 1974 and 1989. In the 2017–18 season did not qualify for the playoffs.

== Honours ==
=== Domestic ===
Slovak 1. Liga

- (silver) Runners-up (1): 2010–11
- (bronze) 3rd place (1): 2015–16

1st. Slovak National Hockey League

- (gold) Winners (3): 1971–72, 1973–74, 1988–89
- (silver) Runners-up (4): 1969–70, 1970–71, 1972–73, 1992–93
- (bronze) 3rd place (1): 1974–75

== Players ==
=== Current roster ===
As of 14 December 2024.

No.	Nat	Player	Pos	S/G	Age	Acquired	Birthplace
91	(Poland)	Aron Chmielewski	LW	R	34	2024	Gdańsk, Poland
–	(United States)	Jerry D'Amigo	RW	L	34	2024	Binghamton, New York, United States
10	(Latvia)	Haralds Egle	C	R	29	2024	Liepāja, Latvia
76	(Slovakia)	Frederik Fekiač	D	R	30	2023	Zvolen, Slovakia
31	(Canada)	Evan Fitzpatrick	G	L	27	2024	St. John's, Newfoundland and Labrador, Canada
52	(Canada)	Cal Foote	D	R	27	2024	Englewood, Colorado, United States
7	(United States)	Max Gerlach	C	R	27	2024	Burnsville, Minnesota, United States
11	(Slovakia)	Adam Haluška	LW	L	25	2019	Liptovský Mikuláš, Slovakia
67	(Slovakia)	Peter Hraško	D	L	34	2023	Detva, Czechoslovakia
8	(Slovakia)	Dominik Jendroľ	D	L	30	2023	Trstená, Slovakia
98	(Slovakia)	Lukáš Ľalík	D	L	25	2023	Zvolen, Slovakia
6	(Slovakia)	Filip Mezovský (A)	D	L	32	2011	Liptovský Mikuláš, Slovakia
66	(Slovakia)	Jakub Nespala	RW	L	25	2023	Poprad, Slovakia
15	(Canada)	Marly Quince	C	L	31	2023	Sioux Lookout, Ontario, Canada
95	(Canada)	Brendan Ranford	C	L	33	2024	Edmonton, Alberta, Canada
43	(Slovakia)	Martin Réway (C)	C	L	30	2023	Prague, Czech Republic
29	(Slovakia)	Roman Rychlík	G	R	25	2023	Trebišov, Slovakia
24	(Slovakia)	Peter Sandor	LW	R	24	2024	Bratislava, Slovakia
18	(Slovakia)	Jakub Sukeľ	RW	L	29	2023	Liptovský Mikuláš, Slovakia
3	(Slovakia)	Filip Surak	G	L	29	2024	Spišská Nová Ves, Slovakia
81	(Slovakia)	Jakub Štrbán	D	L	19	2024	Ilava, Slovakia
89	(Slovakia)	Vladimir Tkáč	LW	L	25	2023	Pittsburgh, Pennsylvania, United States
17	(Slovakia)	Michal Uhrík (A)	RW	L	33	2018	Liptovský Mikuláš, Slovakia
44	(Sweden)	Erik Ullman (A)	D	R	28	2023	Österhaninge, Sweden
22	(Slovakia)	Marek Vankúš	C	L	26	2022	Dolný Kubín, Slovakia
23	(Slovakia)	Matúš Vojtech	RW	R	20	2023	Ilava, Slovakia
82	(Slovakia)	Jakub Žilka	LW	L	30	2023	Zvolen, Slovakia
70	(Slovakia)	Roman Žitný	RW	L	28	2024	Bratislava, Slovakia

== Notable players ==
- Cal Foote
- Ján Laco
- Jerguš Bača
- Martin Cibák
- Rudolf Huna
- Marek Bartánus
- Karol Križan
- Marek Uram
