= List of Detroit Red Wings head coaches =

The Detroit Red Wings are a professional ice hockey team based in Detroit, Michigan. They are members of the Atlantic Division in the Eastern Conference of the National Hockey League (NHL) and are one of the Original Six teams of the league. There have been 28 head coaches in franchise history; three during the era of the Detroit Cougars (1926–1930) and Detroit Falcons (1930–1932) and the rest under the Detroit Red Wings (1932–present). Six Red Wings coaches have been inducted into the Hockey Hall of Fame as players: Jack Adams, Sid Abel, Bill Gadsby, Marcel Pronovost, Ted Lindsay, and Brad Park, while two others as builders: Tommy Ivan and Scotty Bowman. Adams, Bowman, Ivan, and Lindsay have also won the Lester Patrick Trophy, an award presented to those who have provided an outstanding service to hockey in the United States.

Barry Smith has the highest winning percentage of any Red Wings coach, with an .800 record from the five games he coached on an interim basis with Dave Lewis during the 1998 season. He is followed by Lewis who has a .672 winning percentage. Larry Wilson, who coached the 1977 season, has the lowest winning percentage (.139). Jack Adams coached the most games of any Red Wings head coach, 964 games during his tenure with the Cougars, Falcons and Red Wings. Adams also has the most regular season losses and ties. The Jack Adams Award, awarded annually to the National Hockey League head coach "adjudged to have contributed the most to his team's success", is named after him. Mike Babcock has the most regular season wins. Jacques Demers is the only NHL coach to have won the Jack Adams Award twice with the same team. Scotty Bowman also won twice, though with different teams: the first time, he was coach of the Montreal Canadiens. The current head coach of the Red Wings is Todd McLellan, who was hired in December 2024.

== Key ==
Key of terms and definitions
Term	Definition
No.	Number of coaches^{[a]}
GC	Games coached
W	Wins
L	Losses
T	Ties
OT	Overtime/shootout losses^{[b]}
Win%	Winning percentage
#	Spent entire NHL head coaching career with the Red Wings
†	Elected to the Hockey Hall of Fame
‡	Spent entire NHL head coaching career with the Red Wings and also elected to the Hockey Hall of Fame

== Coaches ==
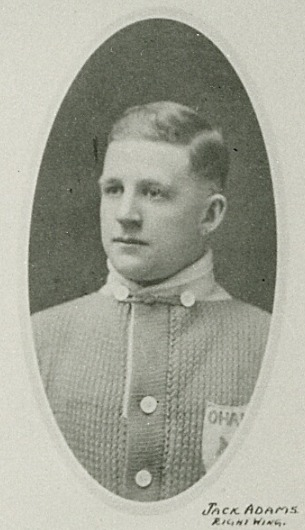
Jack Adams, shown here as a player in the OHA, coached the team from 1927 to 1947.

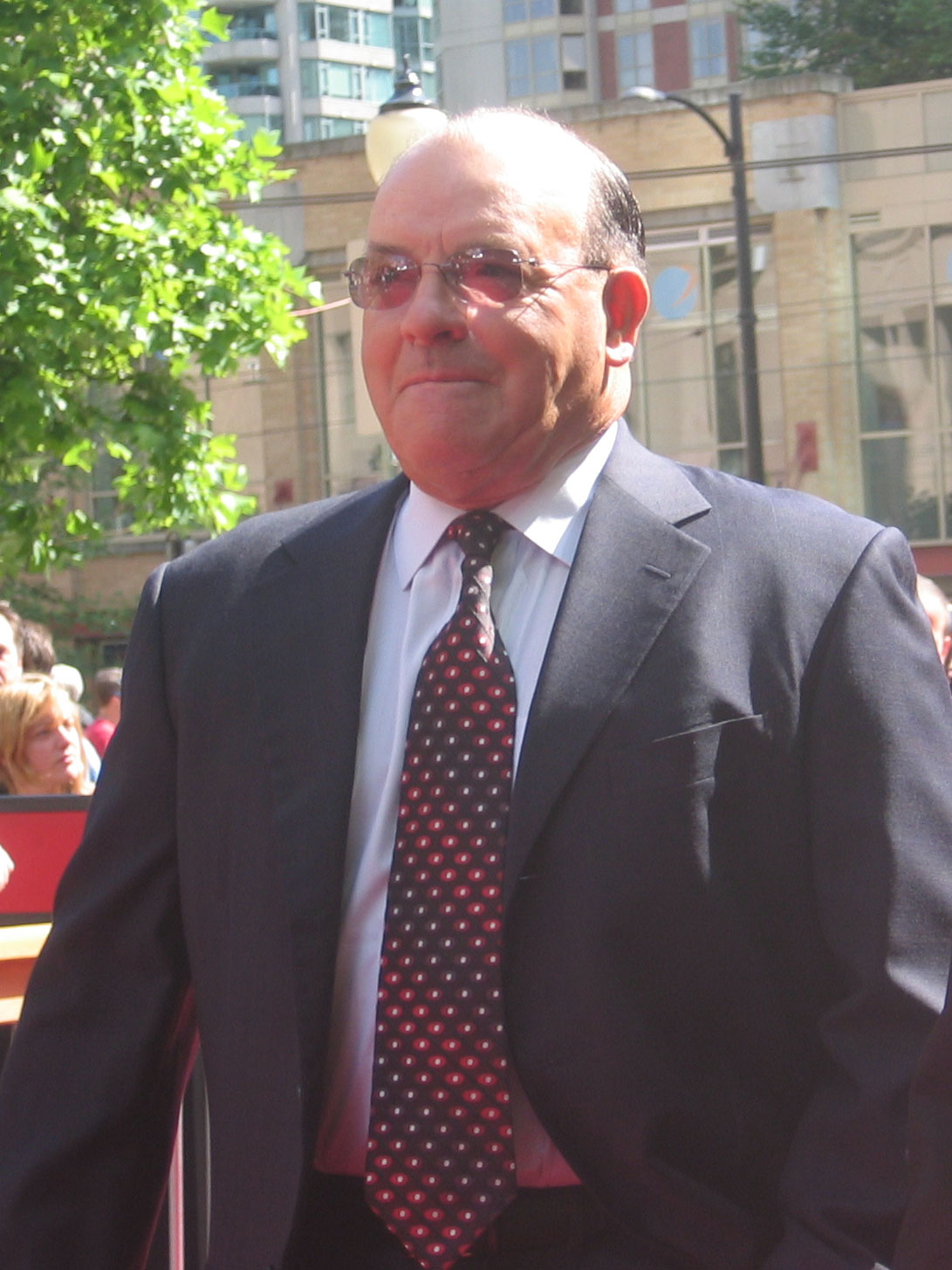
Scotty Bowman, the 23rd head coach of the Red Wings, coached the team from 1993 to 2002.

Note: Statistics are correct through the 2025–26 NHL season.

Head coaches of the Detroit NHL franchise
No.	Name	Term(s)^{[c]}	GC	W	L	T/OT	Win%	GC	W	L	T	Win%	Awards	Ref(s)
No.	Name	Term(s)^{[c]}	Regular season					Playoffs					Awards	Ref(s)
1	Art Duncan	1926–27	33	10	21	2	.333	—	—	—	—	—		
2	Duke Keats‡	1926–27	11	2	7	2	.273	—	—	—	—	—		
3	Jack Adams‡	1927–47	964	413	390	161	.512	105	52	52	1	.500	Stanley Cup (1936, 1937, 1943); First All-Star team Coach (1937, 1943) second All-Star team Coach (1945)	
4	Tommy Ivan†	1947–54	470	262	118	90	.653	67	36	31	0	.537	Stanley Cup (1950, 1952, 1954)	
5	Jimmy Skinner#	1954–58	247	123	78	46	.591	26	14	12	0	.538	Stanley Cup (1955)	
6	Sid Abel†	1958–68; 1969–70	811	340	339	132	.501	76	32	44	0	.421		
7	Bill Gadsby‡	1968–69	78	35	31	12	.526	—	—	—	—	—		
8	Ned Harkness#	1970–71	38	12	22	4	.368	—	—	—	—	—		
9	Doug Barkley#	1970–71; 1975–76	77	20	46	11	.331	—	—	—	—	—		
10	Johnny Wilson	1971–73	145	67	56	22	.538	—	—	—	—	—		
11	Ted Garvin#	1973–74	11	2	8	1	.227	—	—	—	—	—		
12	Alex Delvecchio‡	1973–75; 1975–77	245	82	131	32	.400	—	—	—	—	—		
13	Larry Wilson#	1976–77	36	3	29	4	.139	—	—	—	—	—		
14	Bobby Kromm#	1977–80	231	79	111	41	.431	7	3	4	0	.428	Jack Adams Award (1978)	
15	Ted Lindsay‡	1979–81	29	5	21	3	.224	—	—	—	—	—		
16	Wayne Maxner#	1980–82	129	34	68	27	.368	—	—	—	—	—		
17	Billy Dea#	1981–82	11	3	8	0	.273	—	—	—	—	—		
18	Nick Polano#	1982–85	240	79	127	34	.400	7	1	6	0	.143		
19	Harry Neale	1985–86	35	8	23	4	.286	—	—	—	—	—		
20	Brad Park‡	1985–86	45	9	34	2	.222	—	—	—	—	—		
21	Jacques Demers	1986–90	320	137	136	47	.502	38	20	18	0	.526	Jack Adams Award (1987, 1988)	
22	Bryan Murray	1990–93	244	124	91	29	.568	25	10	15	0	.400		
23	Scotty Bowman†	1993–2002	701	410	193	98	.655	134	86	48	0	.642	Stanley Cup (1997, 1998, 2002); Jack Adams Award (1996)	
24	Barry Smith#	1998–99	5	4	1	0	.800	—	—	—	—	—		
25	Dave Lewis	1998–99; 2002–05	169	100	42	27	.672	16	6	10	0	.375		
26	Mike Babcock	2005–2015	786	458	223	105	.649	123	67	56	0	.545	Stanley Cup (2008)	
27	Jeff Blashill	2015–2022	537	204	261	72	.447	5	1	4	0	.200		
28	Derek Lalonde#	2022–2024	198	89	86	23	.508	—	—	—	–	–		
29	Todd McLellan	2024–present	130	67	49	14	.569	—	—	—	–	–		

== See also ==
- List of NHL head coaches

== Notes ==
- ^{a} A running total of the number of coaches of the Red Wings; thus, any coach who has two or more separate terms as head coach is only counted once.
- ^{b} Prior to the 2005–06 season, the NHL instituted a penalty shootout for regular-season games that remained tied after a five-minute overtime period, which prevented ties.
- ^{c} The term(s) column lists the first year of the season of the coach's first game and the last year of the season of the coach's last game. For example, someone who coached one game in the 2000–2001 season would be listed as coaching the team from 2000–2001, regardless of what calendar year the game occurred within.
