= Todd McLellan =

Canadian ice hockey player and coach

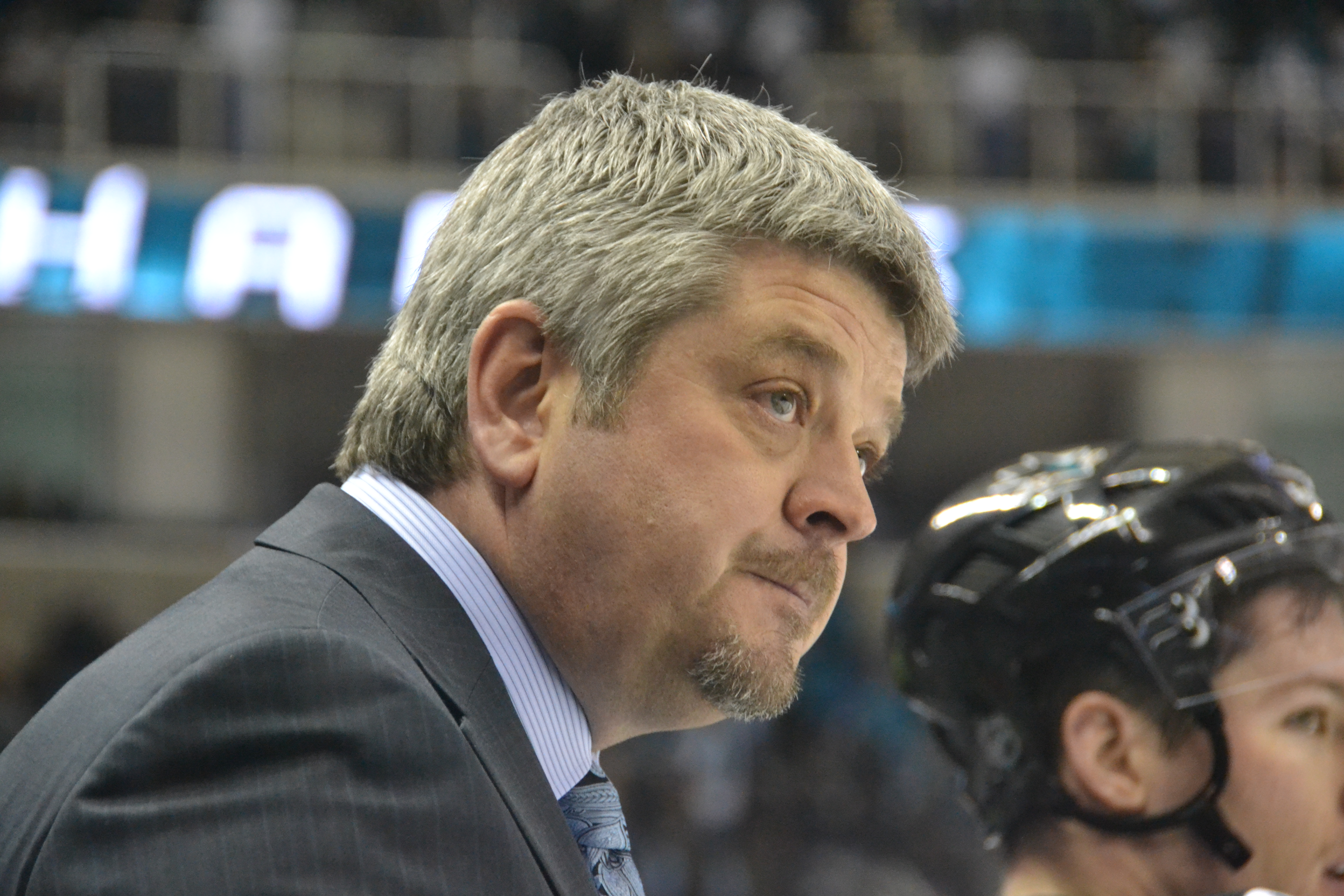
- McLellan with the Sharks in 2013
- Born: October 3, 1967 (age 59) Melville, Saskatchewan, Canada
- Height: 5 ft 11 in (180 cm)
- Weight: 185 lb (84 kg; 13 st 3 lb)
- Position: Centre
- Shot: Left
- Played for: New York Islanders
- Current NHL coach: Detroit Red Wings
- Coached for: San Jose Sharks; Edmonton Oilers; Los Angeles Kings
- NHL draft: 104th overall, 1986; New York Islanders
- Playing career: 1987–1989; 1990–1992
- Coaching career: 1993–present

Todd Andrew McLellan (born October 3, 1967) is a Canadian professional ice hockey coach and former player who is the head coach for the Detroit Red Wings of the National Hockey League (NHL). He previously served as head coach of the San Jose Sharks, Edmonton Oilers, and Los Angeles Kings, and as an assistant coach with the Red Wings, with whom he won the Stanley Cup in 2008. He was drafted in 1986 by the New York Islanders and played five games with the major league club in the 1987–88 season before retiring in the minors the following season due to recurring injury.

== Playing career ==
After living in Goodeve, Saskatchewan, and Melville, Saskatchewan, during his childhood, McLellan started his playing career with the Saskatoon Blades of the Western Hockey League (WHL) from 1983 to 1987. In the 1986 NHL entry draft, he was drafted by the New York Islanders in the fifth round. He played a total of five games at the NHL level, spending most of two seasons with the Islanders' American Hockey League (AHL) affiliate, the Springfield Indians. However, recurring shoulder injuries dating back to his junior hockey days ended McLellan's North American playing career after the 1988–89 season. He scored his only NHL goal in his debut on December 28, 1987, in a 6–4 loss to the New Jersey Devils.

He returned home to study at the University of Saskatchewan for a year, before resuming his playing career for S.IJ. Utrecht of the Eredivisie in the Netherlands. During his three seasons there, the team hired a new coach, who moved in with McLellan and made him a player-coach, which McLellan recognizes as why he became interested in coaching.

== Coaching career ==
Following his stint as a player-coach with SIJ Utrecht, McLellan returned to Canada in 1992. He went into full-time coaching in 1993, being hired as the coach of the North Battleford North Stars of the Saskatchewan Junior League. In 1994, McLellan was hired as the head coach and general manager of the Swift Current Broncos of the WHL, where he succeeded Graham James. In his six seasons with Swift Current, the Broncos qualified for the WHL playoffs in all seasons. McLellan himself was named WHL Executive of the Year in 1997 and Coach of the Year in 2000.

Following his successes at the junior level, McLellan was hired by the expansion Minnesota Wild to coach their minor league affiliate, the Cleveland Lumberjacks of the International Hockey League (IHL). After the IHL folded in 2001, McLellan and his staff were transferred to the Wild's new minor league affiliate, the Houston Aeros of the AHL. As coach of the Aeros, McLellan led Houston to the Calder Cup in 2003.

In 2005, Mike Babcock selected McLellan to serve as his assistant with the Detroit Red Wings. In Detroit, McLellan was tasked with handling the Red Wings' forwards and managing the team's power play, as well as reporting player performance to head coach Babcock. Under his watch, the Red Wings had the top-ranked power play in the NHL, finishing first in power play efficiency in 2005–06 and third in 2007–08. As a member of the coaching staff, McLellan won his first Stanley Cup with the Red Wings in 2007–08.

On June 11, 2008, the San Jose Sharks hired McLellan to become their new head coach, replacing Ron Wilson. He would end up the head coach for the Western Conference All-Star team, and lead the Sharks to their first Presidents' Trophy with an NHL-leading 117 points to finish the regular season, and finished third in voting for that season's Jack Adams Award, behind winner Claude Julien and Andy Murray. On March 14, 2013, with a 4–3 victory over the Los Angeles Kings, McLellan became the winningest coach in Sharks history with 207 victories. On February 5, 2014, against the Dallas Stars, McLellan tied Darryl Sutter for the most games coached in Sharks history with 434.

After the team missed the playoffs in the 2014–15 season, McLellan and the Sharks agreed to mutually part ways on April 20, ending his tenure as the Sharks' winningest coach.

He coached the Canadian national team at the 2015 World Championship, where the team won the title for the first time since 2007 with a perfect 10–0 record.

On May 19, 2015, he was named head coach of the Edmonton Oilers, becoming the 14th head coach in team history. He succeeded Todd Nelson, who took over on an interim basis after Dallas Eakins was fired. At the time of his signing, McLellan became the highest-paid coach in NHL history, earning around $3 million per season. However, he would hold the distinction for exactly one day, as McLellan's former colleague Mike Babcock signed an eight-year contract with the Toronto Maple Leafs worth around $6.25 million per season on May 20.

Todd McLellan coaching with the Red Wings in November 2026

McLellan's first season in Edmonton was a rebuilding one. The Oilers finished with 70 points, the second-worst record in the league. However, the following season—the first in the team's new arena, Rogers Place—saw a dramatic turnaround. The Oilers tallied over 100 points for the first time since the 1980s dynasty years. On March 28, 2017, the Oilers defeated the Los Angeles Kings 2–1 to make the playoffs for the first time in 11 years. They also earned home-ice advantage in a playoff series for the first time since winning their last Cup in 1990. They upended McLellan's old team, the Sharks, in six games to win a playoff series for only the sixth time since 1990.

On November 20, 2018, McLellan was fired by the Oilers and replaced by Ken Hitchcock after posting a record of 9–10–1.

On April 16, 2019, the Los Angeles Kings named McLellan head coach. On February 2, 2024, he was fired, despite signing a one-year contract extension nearly four months prior that would have kept him behind the bench through the 2024–25 season. Before his firing, Los Angeles stumbled after a strong 20–7–4 start to the season, losing 14 of McLellan's final 17 games with a 3–8–6 record.

On December 26, 2024, McLellan returned to the Red Wings, with the team hiring him as head coach after the dismissal of Derek Lalonde.

== Personal life ==
In 1992, McLellan married his wife Debbie. They have two sons, Tyson and Cale.

== Playing career statistics ==
			Regular season					Playoffs
Season	Team	League	GP	G	A	Pts	PIM	GP	G	A	Pts	PIM
1982–83	Saskatoon Blazers	SMHL	25	6	9	15	6	—	—	—	—	—
1983–84	Saskatoon Blades	WHL	50	8	14	22	15	—	—	—	—	—
1984–85	Saskatoon Blades	WHL	41	15	35	50	33	3	1	0	1	0
1985–86	Saskatoon Blades	WHL	27	9	10	19	13	13	9	3	12	8
1986–87	Saskatoon Blades	WHL	60	34	39	73	66	6	1	1	2	2
1987–88	New York Islanders	NHL	5	1	1	2	0	—	—	—	—	—
1987–88	Springfield Indians	AHL	70	18	26	44	32	—	—	—	—	—
1988–89	Springfield Indians	AHL	37	7	19	26	17	—	—	—	—	—
NHL totals			5	1	1	2	0	—	—	—	—	—
AHL totals			107	25	45	70	49	—	—	—	—	—

== Head coaching record ==
Team	Year	Regular season						Postseason			
Team	Year	G	W	L	OTL	Pts	Finish	W	L	Win%	Result
SJS	2008–09	82	53	18	11	117	1st in Pacific	2	4	.333	Lost in conference quarterfinals (ANA)
SJS	2009–10	82	51	20	11	113	1st in Pacific	8	7	.533	Lost in conference finals (CHI)
SJS	2010–11	82	48	25	9	105	1st in Pacific	9	9	.500	Lost in conference finals (VAN)
SJS	2011–12	82	43	29	10	96	2nd in Pacific	1	4	.200	Lost in conference quarterfinals (STL)
SJS	2012–13	48	25	16	7	57	3rd in Pacific	7	4	.636	Lost in conference semifinals (LAK)
SJS	2013–14	82	51	22	9	111	2nd in Pacific	3	4	.429	Lost in first round (LAK)
SJS	2014–15	82	40	33	9	89	5th in Pacific	—	—	—	Missed playoffs
SJS total		540	311	163	66			30	32	.484	6 playoff appearances
EDM	2015–16	82	31	43	8	70	7th in Pacific	—	—	—	Missed playoffs
EDM	2016–17	82	47	26	9	103	2nd in Pacific	7	6	.538	Lost in second round (ANA)
EDM	2017–18	82	36	40	6	78	6th in Pacific	—	—	—	Missed playoffs
EDM	2018–19	20	9	10	1	(19)	(fired)	—	—	—	—
EDM total		266	123	119	24			7	6	.538	1 playoff appearance
LAK	2019–20	70*	29	35	6	64	7th in Pacific	—	—	—	Missed playoffs
LAK	2020–21	56	21	28	7	49	6th in West	—	—	—	Missed playoffs
LAK	2021–22	82	44	27	11	99	3rd in Pacific	3	4	.429	Lost in first round (EDM)
LAK	2022–23	82	47	25	10	104	3rd in Pacific	2	4	.333	Lost in first round (EDM)
LAK	2023–24	48	23	15	10	(56)	(fired)	—	—	—	—
LAK total		338	164	130	44			5	8	.385	2 playoff appearances
DET	2024–25	48	26	18	4	(56)	6th in Atlantic	—	—	—	Missed playoffs
DET	2025–26	82	41	31	10	92	6th in Atlantic	—	—	—	Missed playoffs
DET total		130	67	49	14			—	—	—	
Total		1,274	665	461	148			42	46	.477	9 playoff appearances

- Shortened season due to the COVID-19 pandemic during the 2019–20 season.

Sporting positions
Preceded by Ron Wilson	Head coach of the San Jose Sharks; 2008–2015	Succeeded by Peter DeBoer
Preceded by Todd Nelson	Head coach of the Edmonton Oilers; 2015–2018	Succeeded by Ken Hitchcock
Preceded by Willie Desjardins (interim)	Head coach of the Los Angeles Kings; 2019–2024	Succeeded by Jim Hiller
Preceded by Derek Lalonde	Head coach of the Detroit Red Wings; 2024–present	Incumbent
