= Derek Lalonde =

American ice hockey coach (born 1972)

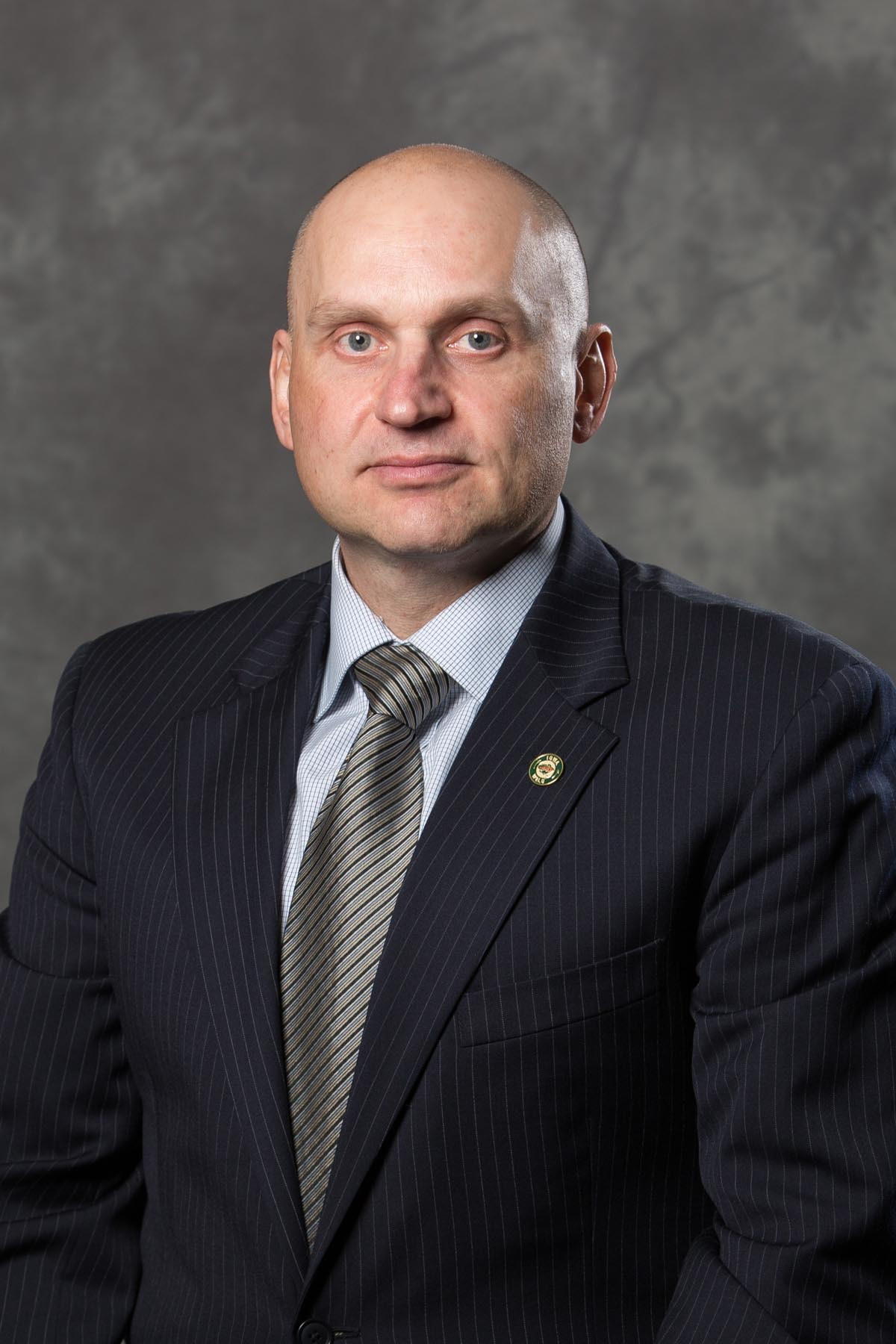
- Lalonde in 2016
- Born: August 18, 1972 (age 53) Brasher Falls, New York, U.S.
- Current NHL coach: Montreal Canadiens
- Coached for: Detroit Red Wings; Tampa Bay Lightning; Toronto Maple Leafs
- Coaching career: 1995–present

Derek Lalonde (born August 18, 1972) is an American professional ice hockey coach who is an associate coach for the Montreal Canadiens of the National Hockey League (NHL).

== Playing career ==
Lalonde played collegiately for Cortland State as a goaltender from 1991 to 1994. He graduated with a bachelor's degree in physical education, and later earned a Master of Arts in education administration from the Massachusetts College of Liberal Arts.

== Coaching career ==
Lalonde's coaching career began as a graduate assistant at Massachusetts College of Liberal Arts from 1995 to 1997. In 1998, he began a two-year stint as an assistant coach at Lebanon Valley College, followed by two seasons as an assistant at Hamilton College.

Lalonde's assistant coaching stints continued at Ferris State University from 2002 to 2006, followed by the University of Denver from 2006 to 2011. He then assumed head coaching duties for the Green Bay Gamblers of the United States Hockey League (USHL) where he was named the USHL's Coach of the Year in 2012 after the Gamblers posted a 47–9–2–2 record en route to their fourth Clark Cup title in team history.

From 2014 to 2016, Lalonde served as head coach of the Toledo Walleye of the ECHL, leading the team to consecutive Brabham Cup titles as league regular-season champions. In his first season in 2014, he led the Walleye to a 50–15–5–2 record and won the John Brophy Award as the ECHL's Coach of the Year. He then served as the head coach of the Iowa Wild of the American Hockey League (AHL) for two seasons beginning in 2016, where he posted a 69–58–17–8 record. Lalonde was member of the Tampa Bay Lightning coaching staff from 2018 to 2022, helping guide the team to back-to-back Stanley Cup championships in 2020 and 2021.

On June 30, 2022, he was named the head coach of the Detroit Red Wings. On March 28, 2023, Lalonde was ejected for the first time in his NHL career in a win over the Pittsburgh Penguins. This was the first NHL coach ejection since San Jose Sharks coach David Quinn on March 8, 2023, and the first for a Red Wings coach since Jeff Blashill on February 4, 2018. Following a 13–17–4 start to the 2024–25 season, Lalonde was fired by the Red Wings on December 26, 2024, and replaced by Todd McLellan.

On June 6, 2025, Lalonde was hired as an assistant coach by the Toronto Maple Leafs. After a lone season with the organization, he was subsequently fired in July 2026. Thereafter, Lalonde joined the Montreal Canadiens as an associate coach beginning in the 2026–27 season.

== Head coaching record ==
| Team | Year | Regular season | | | | | | | Postseason | | |
| Team | Year | G | W | L | OTL | Pts | Finish | W | L | Win % | Result |
|---|---|---|---|---|---|---|---|---|---|---|---|
| DET | 2022–23 | 82 | 35 | 37 | 10 | 80 | 7th in Atlantic | — | — | — | Missed playoffs |
| DET | 2023–24 | 82 | 41 | 32 | 9 | 91 | 5th in Atlantic | — | — | — | Missed playoffs |
| DET | 2024–25 | 34 | 13 | 17 | 4 | (30) | (fired) | — | — | — | — |
| Total | | 198 | 89 | 86 | 23 | | | — | — | — | |

== Awards and championships ==
USHL

- USHL Coach of the Year: 2012
- Clark Cup champion: 2012

ECHL

- John Brophy Award (ECHL Coach of the Year): 2015

NHL

- Stanley Cup champion (as assistant coach): 2020, 2021

Sporting positions
| Preceded by Jeff Blashill | Head coach of the Detroit Red Wings; 2022–2024 | Succeeded by Todd McLellan |
