= Jeff Blashill =

American ice hockey coach (born 1973)

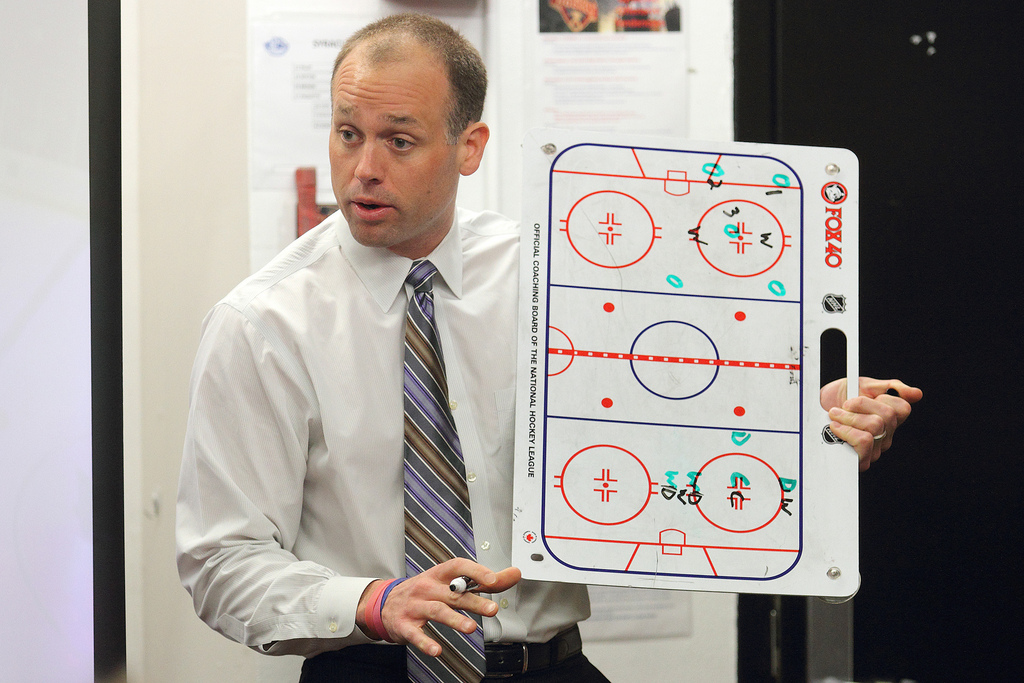
- Blashill in 2013
- Born: December 10, 1973 (age 52) Detroit, Michigan, U.S.
- Current NHL coach: Chicago Blackhawks
- Coached for: Detroit Red Wings
- Coaching career: 1999–present

Jeff Blashill (born December 10, 1973) is an American professional ice hockey coach who is the head coach for the Chicago Blackhawks of the National Hockey League (NHL). He was formerly the head coach for the Detroit Red Wings of the NHL.

Blashill previously served as the head coach for the Grand Rapids Griffins of the American Hockey League (AHL), an assistant coach for the Red Wings and Tampa Bay Lightning, the head coach at Western Michigan, the head coach and general manager of the Indiana Ice and the assistant hockey coach at both Ferris State and Miami University.

== Playing career ==
Blashill was born in Detroit, Michigan, but grew up in Sault Ste. Marie in the state's Upper Peninsula. He played college ice hockey as a goaltender at Ferris State University for the Bulldogs from 1994 to 1998. He earned team Rookie of the Year honors in 1994 and was named to the Central Collegiate Hockey Association (CCHA) All-Academic Team in 1997. Prior to his collegiate career, Blashill played at the junior level for the Des Moines Buccaneers of the United States Hockey League (USHL) from 1991 to 1994.

== Coaching career ==
After his playing career ended, Blashill joined Ferris State's Bulldogs team as an assistant coach in 1999. He remained there for three seasons before joining Miami University as an assistant coach for the RedHawks in 2002.

In 2008, Blashill was named head coach and general manager of the Indiana Ice, a Tier 1 junior hockey team in the USHL. In his first season, the Ice won the Clark Cup as USHL champions.

Blashill was later named head coach of Western Michigan University's Broncos team on April 6, 2010. In his first season as head coach, Blashill led Western Michigan to a top-four finish in the CCHA, the CCHA Championship game and the 2011 NCAA Division I men's ice hockey tournament, the most successful season for the University in 15 years. After the season, he was named USCHO Coach of the Year, Inside College Hockey Coach of the Year and College Hockey News Coach of the Year.

In July 2011, after one season at the helm of the Broncos, Blashill accepted an assistant coaching position with the NHL's Detroit Red Wings under head coach Mike Babcock.

On June 25, 2012, it was announced that Blashill would become the head coach of the Grand Rapids Griffins, the top minor league affiliate of the Red Wings in the American Hockey League (AHL). He replaced Curt Fraser, who had accepted an assistant coaching position with the Dallas Stars of the NHL. Blashill was replaced on the Red Wings staff by NHL veteran assistant Tom Renney.

On June 18, 2013, the Griffins under Blashill won the Calder Cup as AHL champions for the first time in club history.

In his second season with Grand Rapids, Blashill was awarded the Louis A. R. Pieri Memorial Award as the AHL's most outstanding coach for the 2013–14 season. In two seasons as head coach, he guided the Griffins to a combined 88–48–2–12 record. During his tenure, Griffins posted three separate seven-game winning streaks while never losing more than two consecutive games in regulation.

On June 4, 2014, it was announced that Blashill had agreed to a new three-year contract with the Red Wings organization through to the 2016–17 season to continue coaching the Griffins.

With a win over the Rockford IceHogs on April 1, 2015, Blashill became the first coach in Griffins franchise history to post three 40-win seasons and three 90-point seasons. In three seasons with the Griffins, he compiled a 134–71–12–11 regular season record and won seven of nine AHL playoff series. He is the only coach in Griffins history to qualify for the Calder Cup playoffs in three consecutive seasons.

Following the departure of Detroit head coach Mike Babcock to the Toronto Maple Leafs, Blashill was named head coach of the Red Wings on June 9, 2015. On April 2, 2019, the Red Wings announced they signed Blashill to a two-year contract extension. On May 18, 2021, the Red Wings signed Blashill to a contract extension. On April 30, 2022, general manager Steve Yzerman announced that Blashill's contract would not be extended, ending his tenure in Detroit. During his seven seasons as head coach, he led the Red Wings to a 204–261–72 overall record.

On July 12, 2022, Blashill was named an assistant coach of the Tampa Bay Lightning.

On May 22, 2025, Blashill was named head coach of the Chicago Blackhawks.

=== International ===
Blashill has also been a member of Team USA's coaching staff four times in international competition, at the 2006 Ivan Hlinka Memorial Tournament, the 2009 World Junior A Challenge, the 2009 World Junior Ice Hockey Championships, and the 2017 IIHF World Championship.

== Personal life ==
Blashill was born in Detroit and raised in Sault Ste Marie. He is married with three children. Jeff's brother, Tim Blashill, also played and coached college hockey. Tim currently coaches high school hockey in Big Rapids, Michigan, and also serves as program coordinator for Ferris State University's Ewigleben Arena.

== Head coaching record ==
=== NHL ===
Team	Year	Regular season						Postseason			
Team	Year	G	W	L	OTL	Pts	Finish	W	L	Win%	Result
DET	2015–16	82	41	30	11	93	3rd in Atlantic	1	4	.200	Lost in first round
DET	2016–17	82	33	36	13	79	7th in Atlantic	—	—	—	Missed playoffs
DET	2017–18	82	30	39	13	73	5th in Atlantic	—	—	—	Missed playoffs
DET	2018–19	82	32	40	10	74	7th in Atlantic	—	—	—	Missed playoffs
DET	2019–20	71*	17	49	5	39	8th in Atlantic	—	—	—	Missed playoffs
DET	2020–21	56	19	27	10	48	7th in Central	—	—	—	Missed playoffs
DET	2021–22	82	32	40	10	74	6th in Atlantic	—	—	—	Missed playoffs
DET total		537	204	261	72			1	4	.200	1 playoffs appearance
CHI	2025–26	82	29	39	14	72	8th in Central	—	—	—	Missed playoffs
CHI total		82	29	39	14			—	—	—	
Total		619	233	300	86			1	4	.200	1 playoffs appearance

- Shortened season due to the COVID-19 pandemic during the 2019–20 season

=== Other leagues ===
==== College ====
Record table
Season	Team	Overall	Conference	Standing	Postseason
Western Michigan Broncos (CCHA) (2010–2011)
2010–11	Western Michigan	20–13–10	10–9–9	4th	NCAA Midwest Regional semifinals
Western Michigan:		20–13–10	10–9–9		
Total:		20–13–10	10–9–9		
National champion Postseason invitational champion Conference regular season champion Conference regular season and conference tournament champion Division regular season champion Division regular season and conference tournament champion Conference tournament champion

Team	League	Year	G	W	L	T	OTL	Result
Indiana Ice	USHL	2008–09	60	39	19	0	2	Clark Cup champions
Indiana Ice	USHL	2009–10	60	33	24	0	3	Lost in semifinals
Grand Rapids Griffins	AHL	2012–13	76	42	26	0	8	Calder Cup champions
Grand Rapids Griffins	AHL	2013–14	76	46	23	0	7	Lost in conference semifinals
Grand Rapids Griffins	AHL	2014–15	76	46	22	0	8	Lost in conference finals
Minor league career totals		5 seasons	390	225	127	10	28	

Sporting positions
Preceded by Mike Babcock	Head coach of the Detroit Red Wings; 2015–2022	Succeeded by Derek Lalonde
Preceded by Anders Sörensen	Head coach of the Chicago Blackhawks; 2025–present	Incumbent
