= List of NHL head coaches =

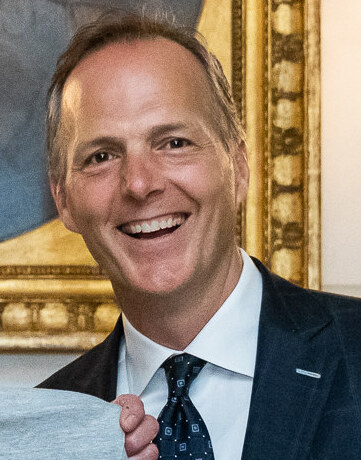
Jon Cooper has been the head coach of the Tampa Bay Lightning since 2013. He is currently the longest tenured coach in the NHL.

The National Hockey League (NHL) is a professional ice hockey league composed of 32 teams, founded in 1917. Each team is entitled to one head coach who handles the directing of games and team practices, while providing direction and strategy for their players and deciding which players will play in games and the lines they will play on. In some cases, a coach will only serve on an interim basis, while some teams may have more than one coach who serve as co-coaches. Outside the team management, the coach also addresses the media.

== Key ==
Abbreviation	Definition
G	Games coached
W	Wins
L	Losses
T	Ties
OTL	Overtime/shootout losses
Pts.	Points
P%	Points percentage (Note: Points percentage is calculated as follows: (Wins + ½ Ties + ½ Overtime/shootout losses) ÷ Games coached)

== Coaches ==
Note: Statistics are updated through the last season (2025–26).

Team	Coach	Start date (Note: Start date of current term at the team; each date is linked to an article about that particular NHL season.)	Record with team (Note: Coaching records from the current team.)							Career record (Note: Career coaching records in the NHL; records in other leagues are not included.)							Professional career
Team	Coach	Start date	G	W	L	T	OTL	Pts.	P%	G	W	L	T	OTL	Pts.	P%	Professional career
Anaheim Ducks	Joel Quenneville	May 8, 2025	82	43	33	—	6	92	.561	1,850	1,012	605	77	156	2,257	.610	1978–1992
Boston Bruins	Marco Sturm	June 5, 2025	82	45	27	—	10	100	.610	82	45	27	—	10	100	.610	1995–2013
Buffalo Sabres	Lindy Ruff	April 22, 2024	1,329	657	494	78	100	1,492	.561	1,938	950	741	78	169	2,147	.554	1979–1993
Calgary Flames	Ryan Huska	June 12, 2023	248	113	106	—	29	255	.514	248	113	106	—	29	255	.514	1995–2000
Carolina Hurricanes	Rod Brind'Amour	May 8, 2018	616	378	182	—	56	812	.659	616	378	182	—	56	812	.659	1989–2010
Chicago Blackhawks	Jeff Blashill	May 22, 2025	82	29	39	—	14	72	.439	619	233	300	—	86	552	.446	None
Colorado Avalanche	Jared Bednar	August 25, 2016	782	445	262	—	75	965	.617	782	445	262	—	75	965	.617	1993–2002
Columbus Blue Jackets	Rick Bowness	January 12, 2026	37	21	11	—	5	47	.635	840	331	419	48	42	752	.448	1975–1984
Dallas Stars	Glen Gulutzan	July 1, 2025	212	114	77	—	21	249	.587	376	196	145	—	35	427	.568	1996–2003
Detroit Red Wings	Todd McLellan	December 26, 2024	130	67	49	—	14	148	.569	1,274	665	461	—	148	1,478	.580	1987–1992
Edmonton Oilers	Mike Babcock	June 23, 2026	—	—	—	—	—	—	—	1,301	700	418	19	164	1,583	.608	1987–1988
Florida Panthers	Paul Maurice	June 22, 2022	328	181	125	—	22	384	.585	2,012	956	805	99	152	2,163	.538	None
Los Angeles Kings	Peter Laviolette	June 9, 2026	—	—	—	—	—	—	—	1,594	846	562	25	161	1,878	.589	1986–1997
Minnesota Wild	John Hynes	November 27, 2023	227	125	78	—	24	274	.604	829	409	333	—	87	905	.546	None
Montreal Canadiens	Martin St. Louis	February 9, 2022	365	163	155	—	47	373	.511	365	163	155	—	47	373	.511	1998–2015
Nashville Predators	Andrew Brunette	May 31, 2023	246	115	108	—	23	253	.514	321	166	126	—	29	361	.562	1993–2012
New Jersey Devils	Sheldon Keefe	May 23, 2024	164	84	70	—	10	178	.543	513	296	167	—	50	642	.626	2000–2004
New York Islanders	Peter DeBoer	April 5, 2026	4	1	3	—	0	2	.250	1,265	663	450	—	152	1,478	.584	1988–1991
New York Rangers	Mike Sullivan	May 2, 2025	82	34	39	—	9	77	.470	999	513	350	15	121	1,162	.582	1990–2002
Ottawa Senators	Travis Green	May 7, 2024	164	89	57	—	18	196	.598	499	230	216	—	53	513	.514	1990–2008
Philadelphia Flyers	Rick Tocchet	May 14, 2025	82	43	27	—	12	98	.598	720	329	292	—	99	757	.526	1984–2002
Pittsburgh Penguins	Dan Muse	June 4, 2025	82	41	25	—	16	98	.598	82	41	25	—	16	98	.598	None
San Jose Sharks	Ryan Warsofsky	June 13, 2024	164	59	85	—	20	138	.421	164	59	85	—	20	138	.421	2011–2012
Seattle Kraken	Lane Lambert	May 29, 2025	82	34	37	—	11	79	.482	209	95	83	—	31	221	.529	1983–2001
St. Louis Blues	Jim Montgomery	November 24, 2024	142	72	51	—	19	163	.574	439	252	135	—	52	556	.633	1990–2003
Tampa Bay Lightning	Jon Cooper	March 25, 2013	1,043	622	332	—	89	1,333	.639	1,043	622	332	—	89	1,333	.639	None
Toronto Maple Leafs	Jim Hiller	June 17, 2026	—	—	—	—	—	—	—	175	93	58	—	24	210	.600	1992–2002
Utah Mammoth	André Tourigny	April 18, 2024 (Note: Tourigny was originally hired as head coach of the Arizona Coyotes on July 1, 2021; he retained his role as head coach upon the transfer of Arizona's hockey assets to Utah in 2024.)	164	81	64	—	19	181	.552	410	170	195	—	45	385	.470	None
Vancouver Canucks	Manny Malhotra	June 1, 2026	—	—	—	—	—	—	—	—	—	—	—	—	—	—	1998–2016
Vegas Golden Knights	Ryan Craig	June 17, 2026	–	–	–	—	–	–	–	–	–	–	–	–	–	–	2003–2017
Washington Capitals	Spencer Carbery	May 30, 2023	246	134	83	—	29	297	.604	246	134	83	—	29	297	.604	2006–2010
Winnipeg Jets	Scott Arniel	May 24, 2024	164	91	57	—	16	198	.604	287	136	117	—	34	306	.533	1981–1999

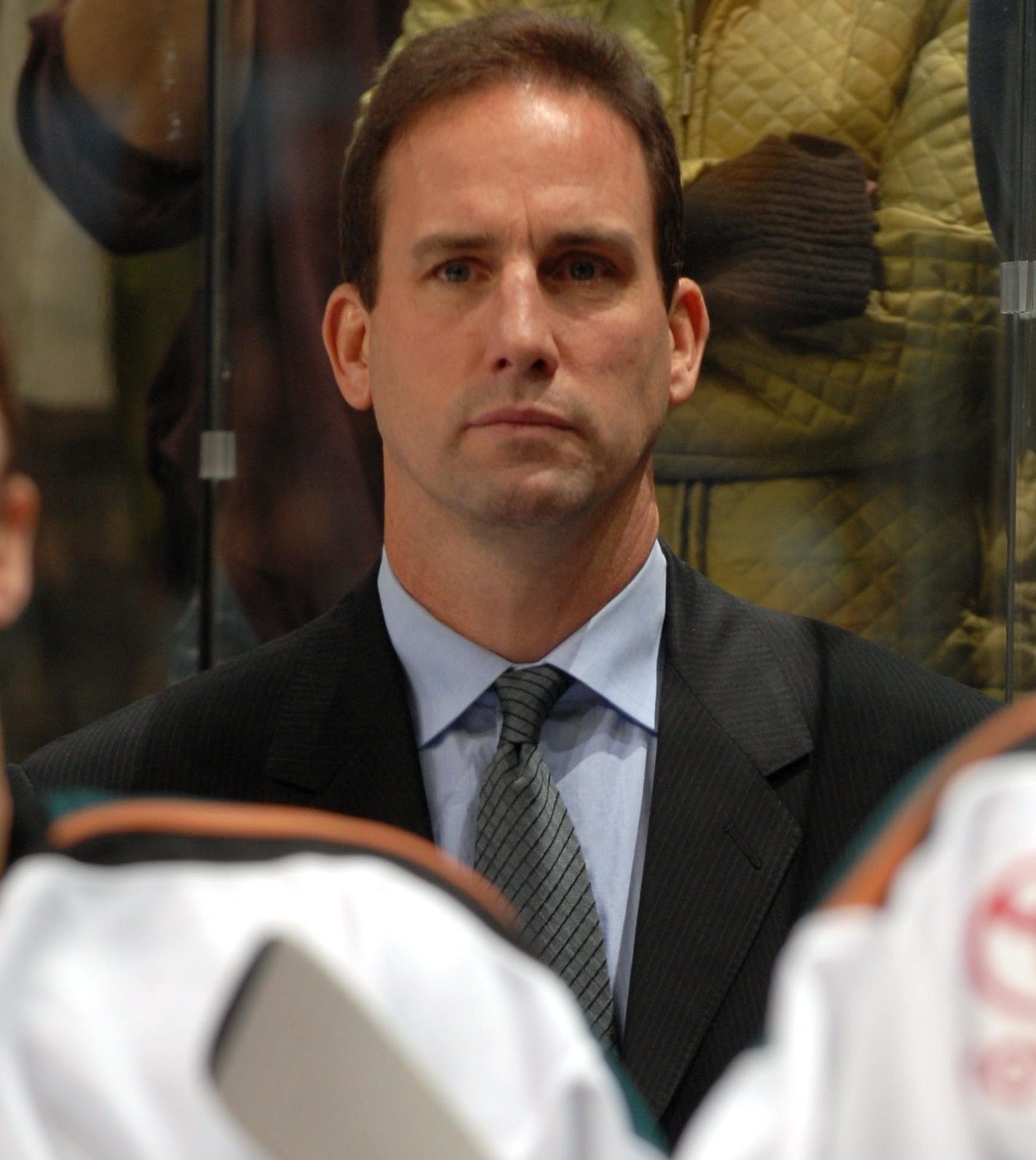
Scott Arniel, Winnipeg Jets

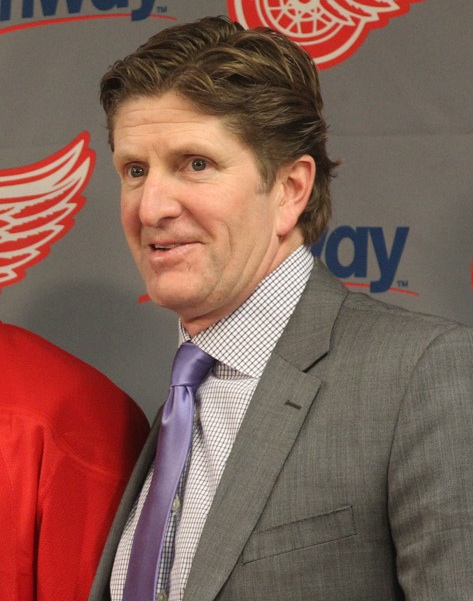
Mike Babcock, Edmonton Oilers

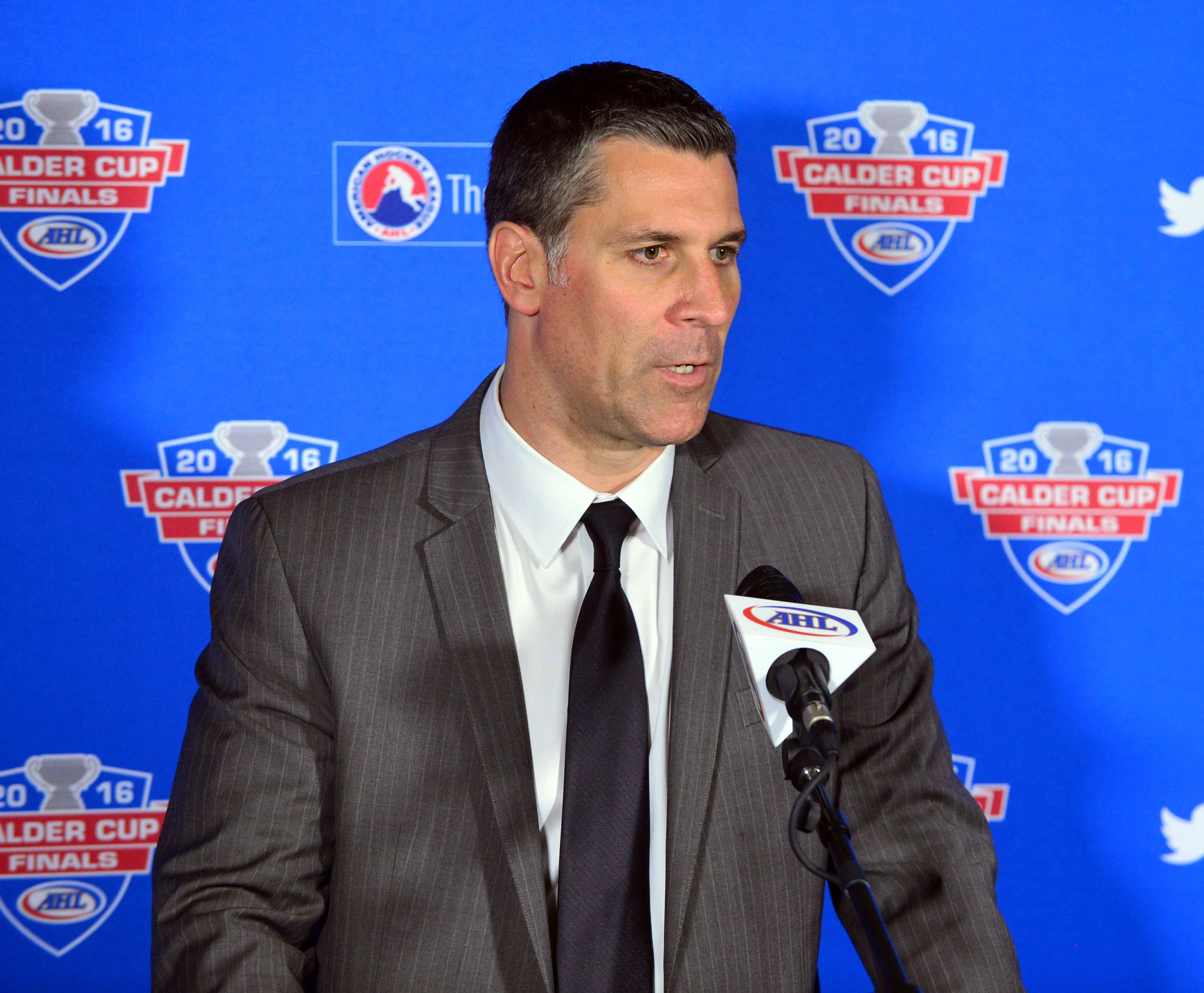
Jared Bednar, Colorado Avalanche

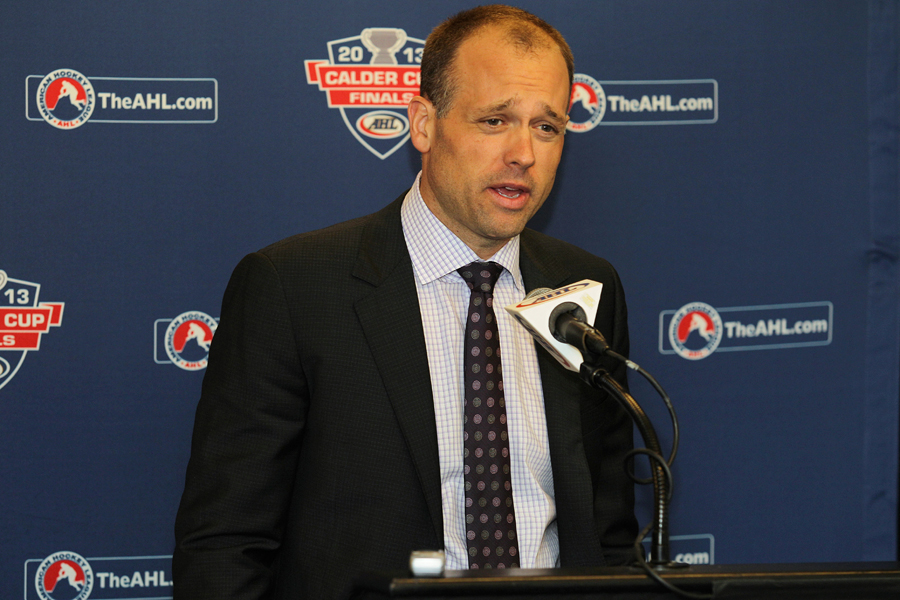
Jeff Blashill, Chicago Blackhawks

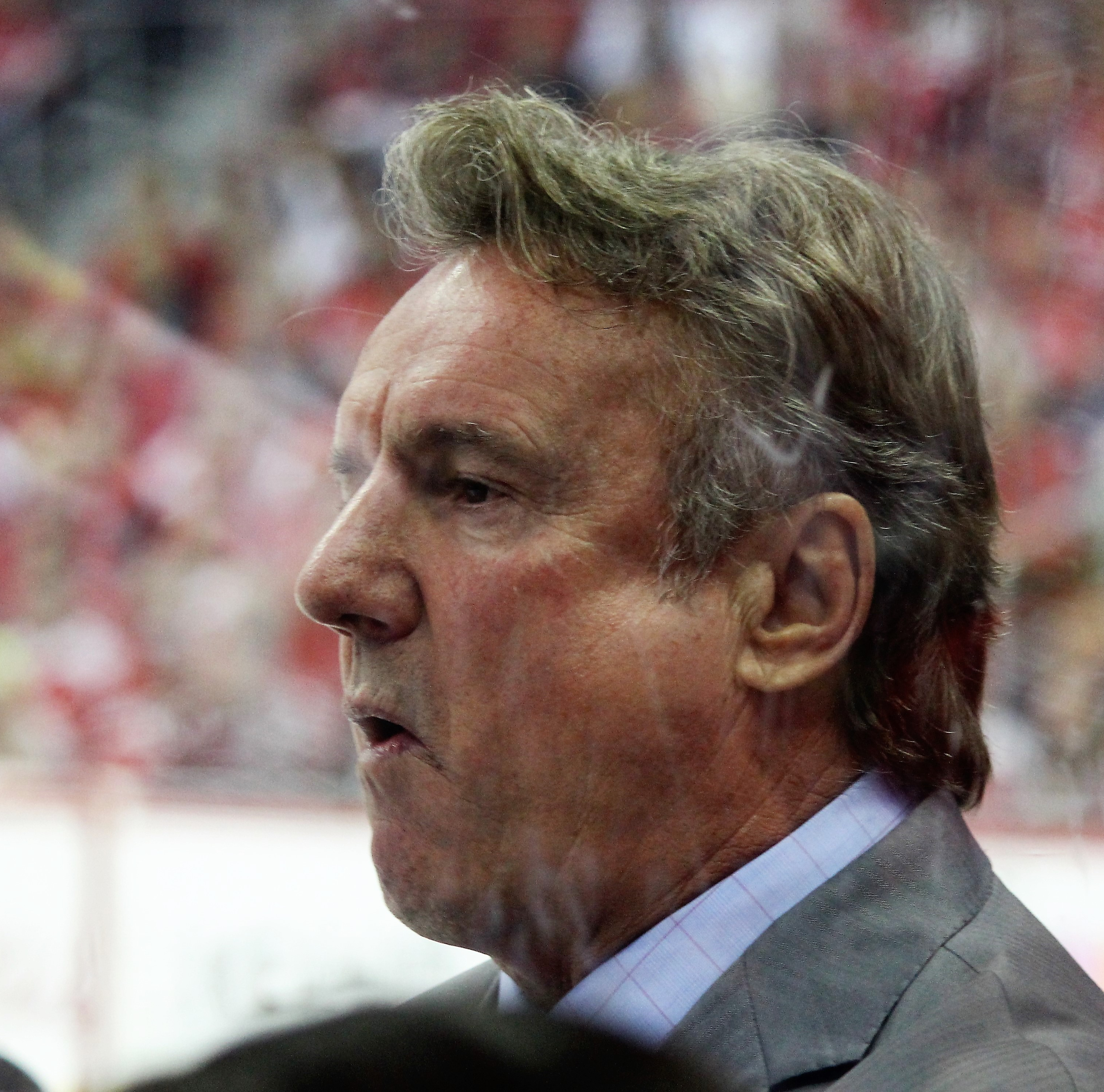
Rick Bowness, Columbus Blue Jackets

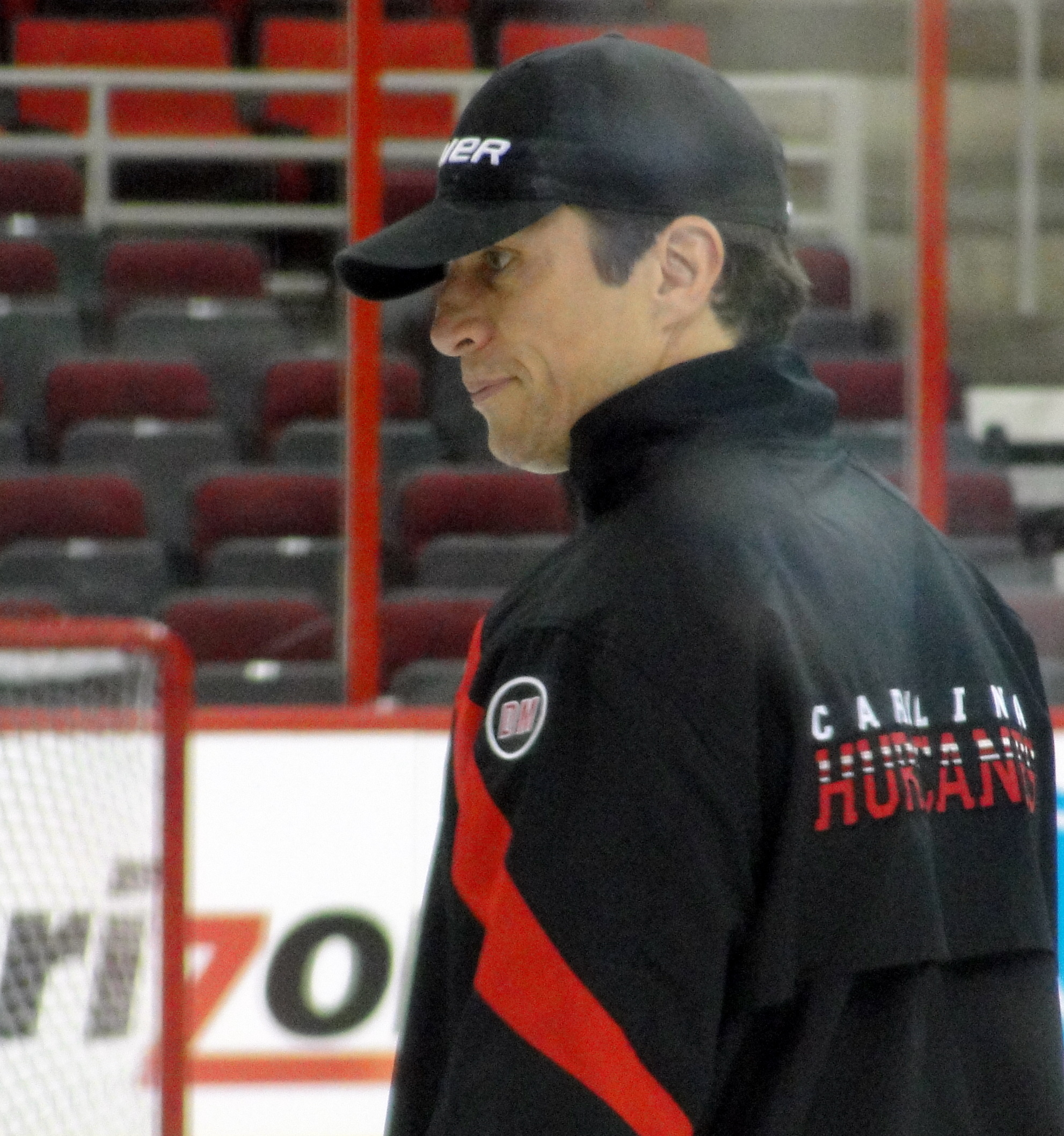
Rod Brind'Amour, Carolina Hurricanes

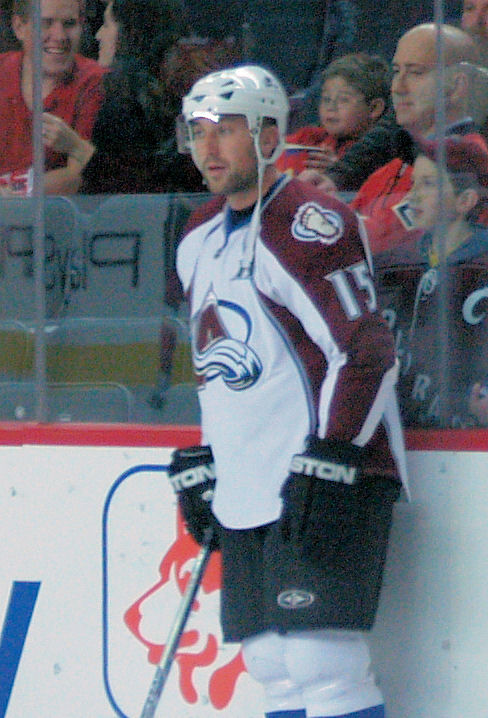
Andrew Brunette, Nashville Predators

Spencer Carbery, Washington Capitals

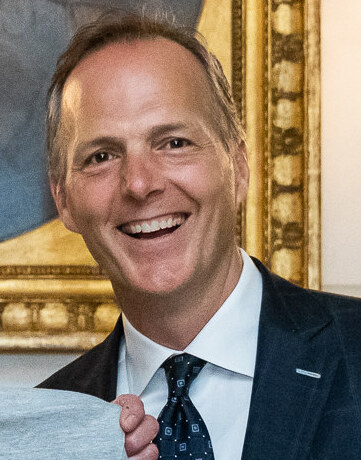
Jon Cooper, Tampa Bay Lightning

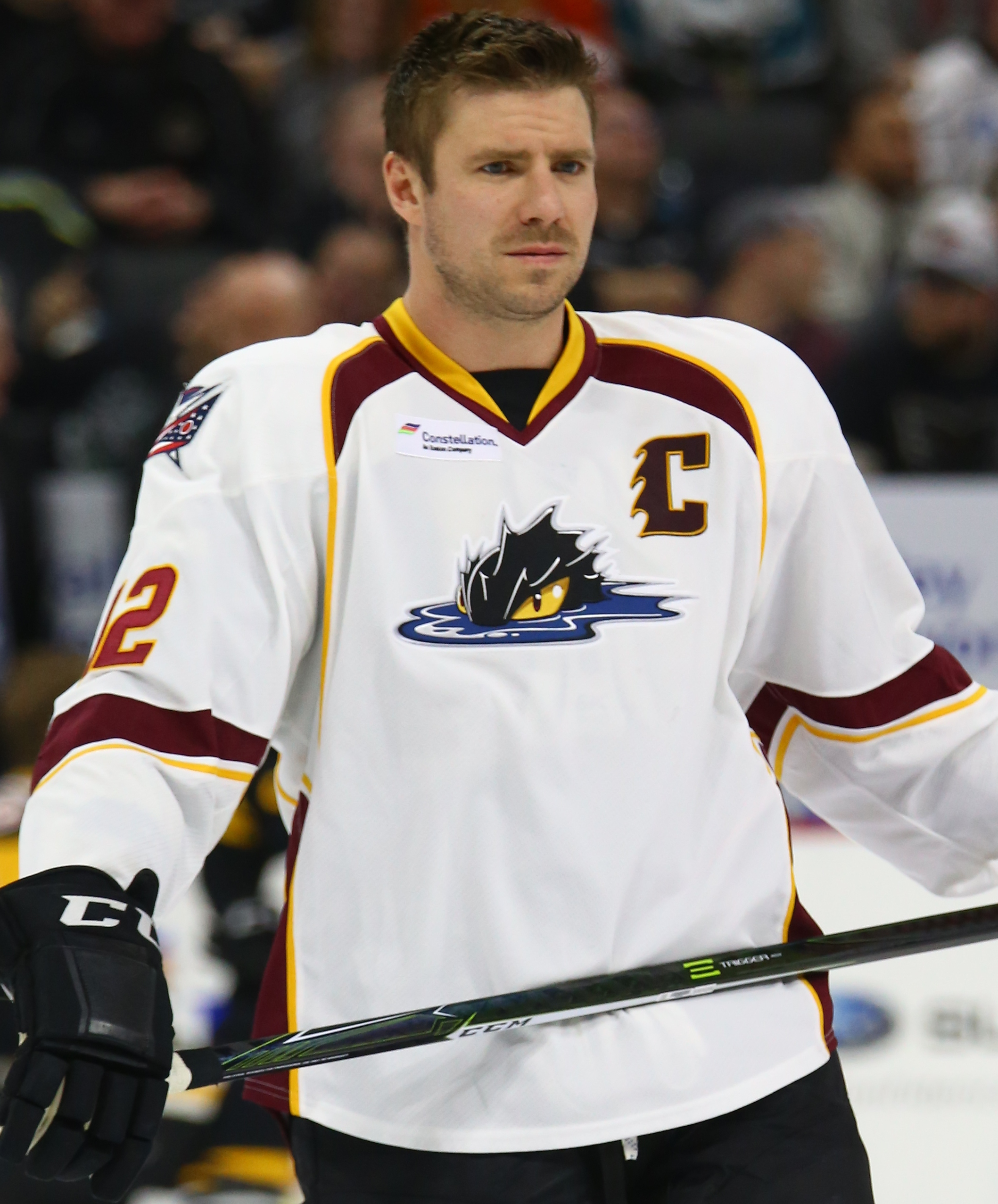
Ryan Craig, Vegas Golden Knights

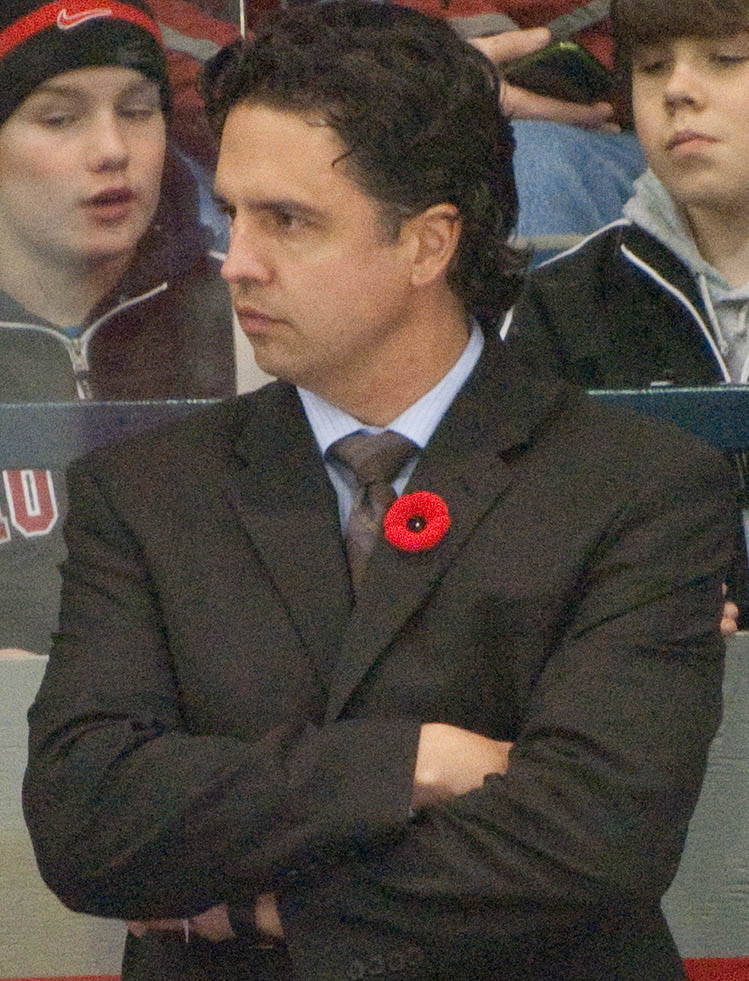
Travis Green, Ottawa Senators

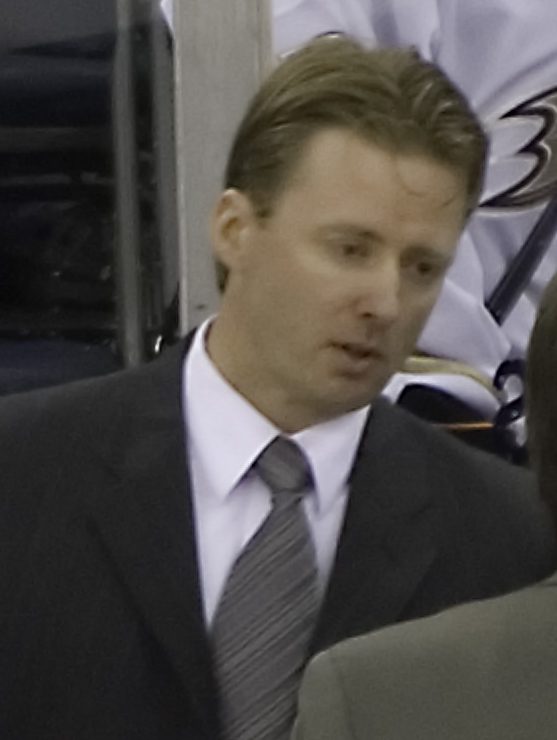
Glen Gulutzan, Dallas Stars

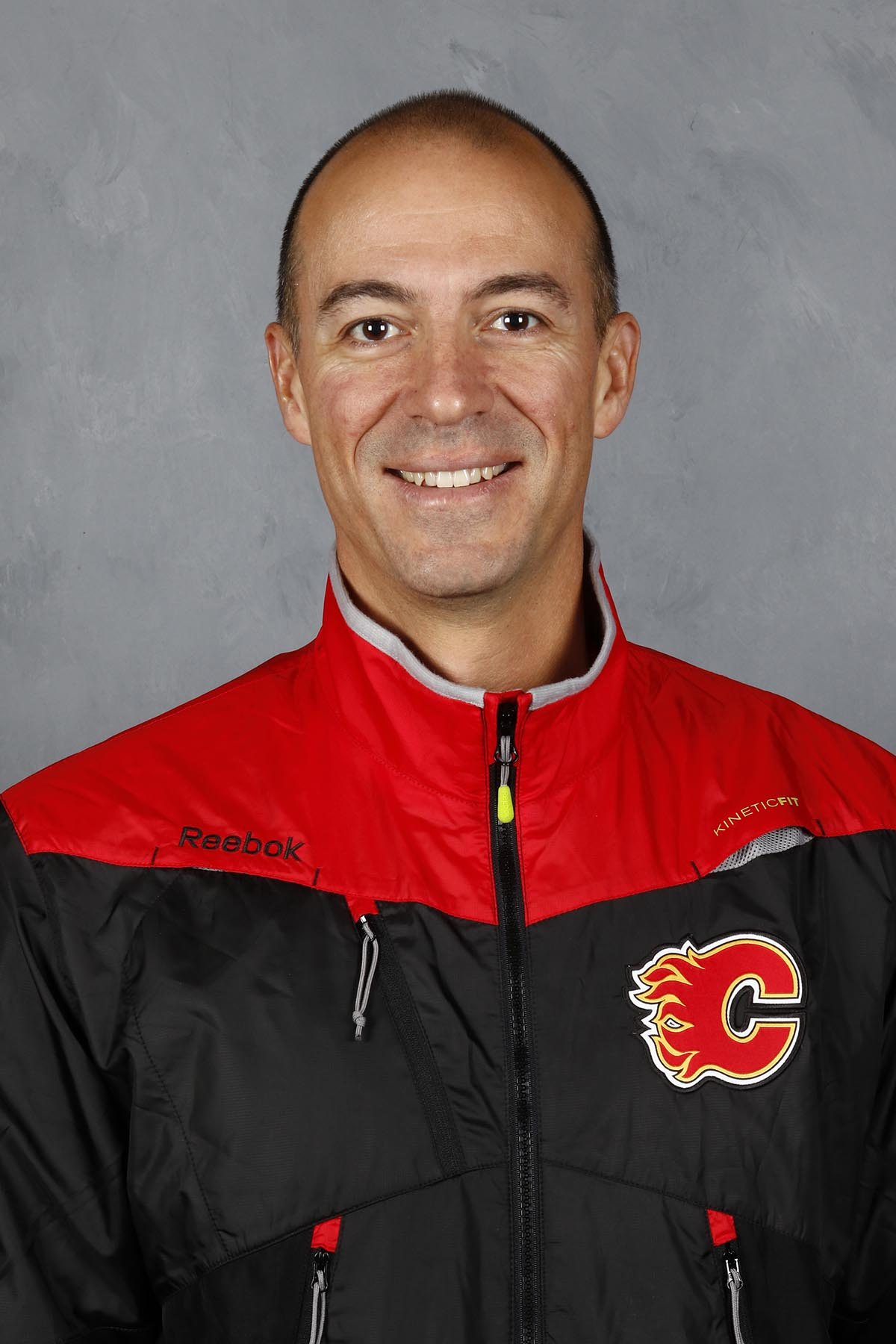
Ryan Huska, Calgary Flames

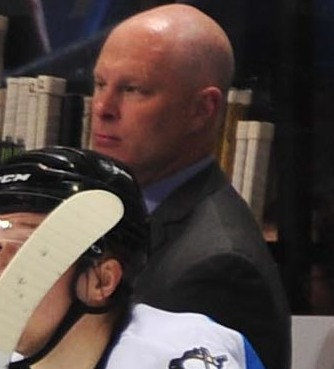
John Hynes, Minnesota Wild

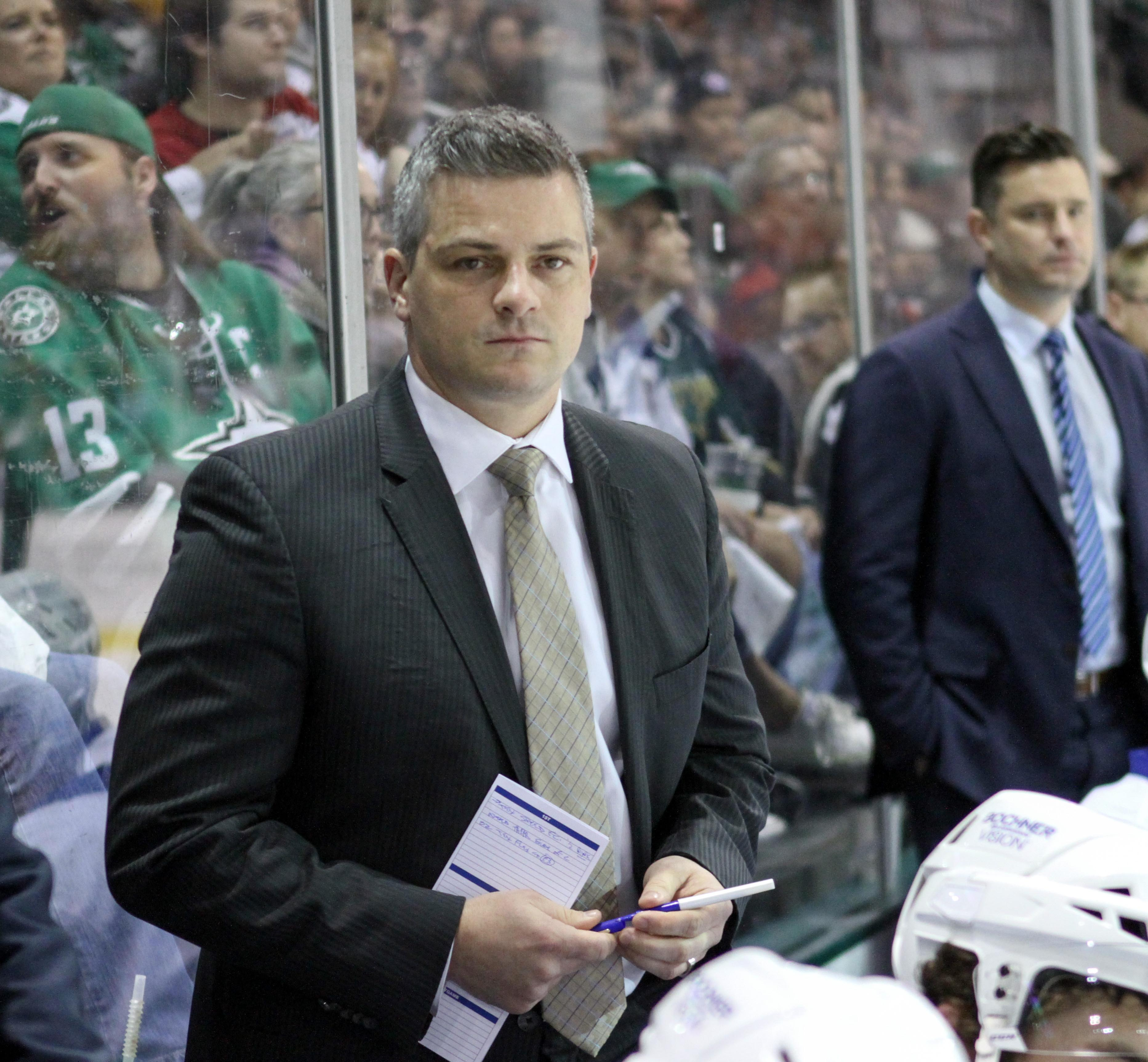
Sheldon Keefe, New Jersey Devils

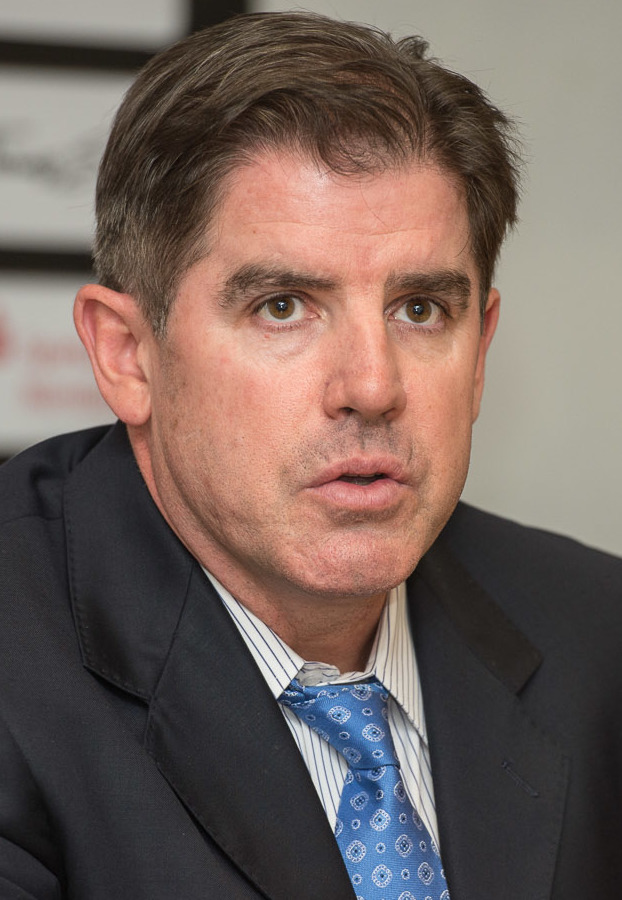
Peter Laviolette, Los Angeles Kings

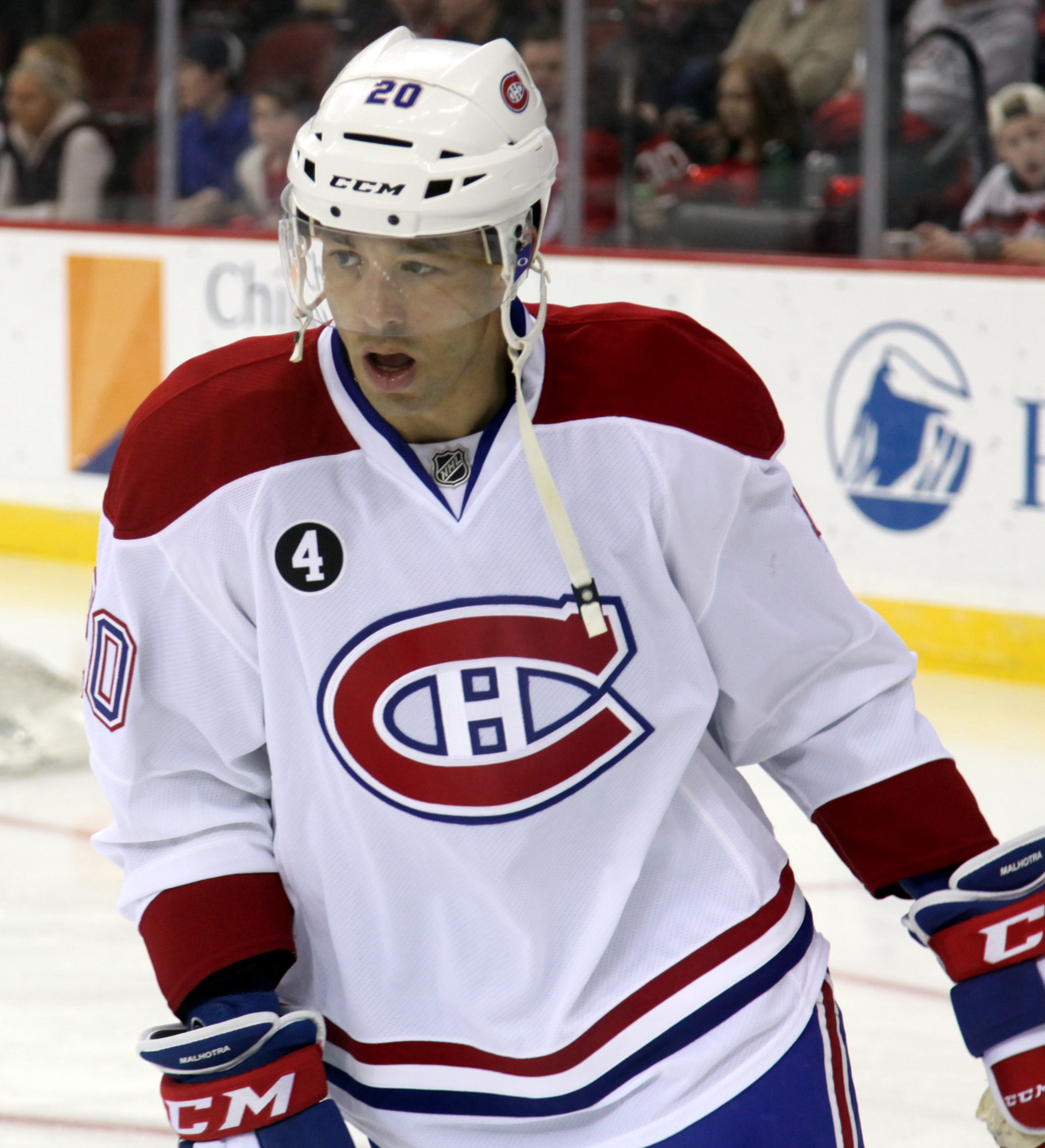
Manny Malhotra, Vancouver Canucks

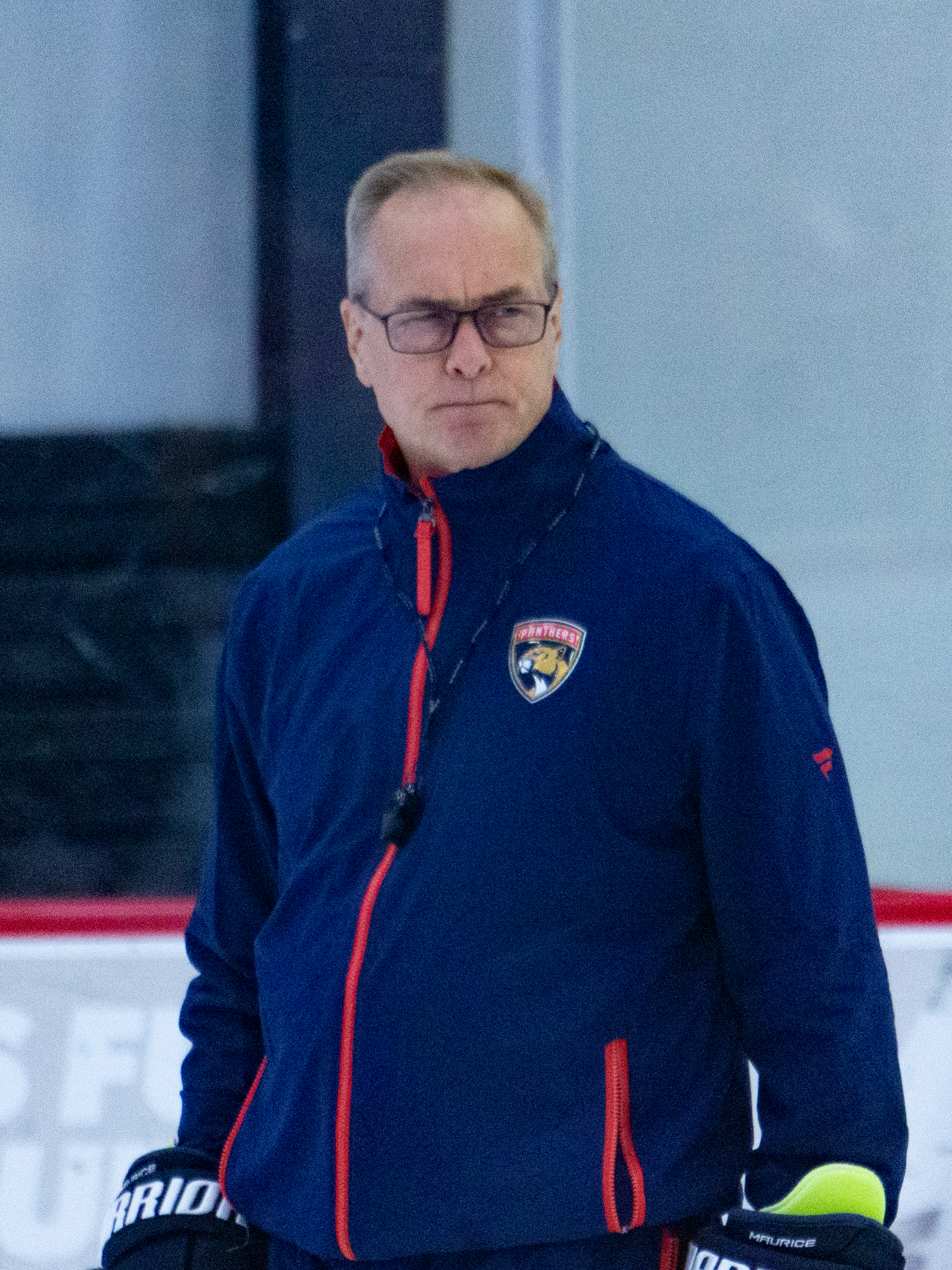
Paul Maurice, Florida Panthers

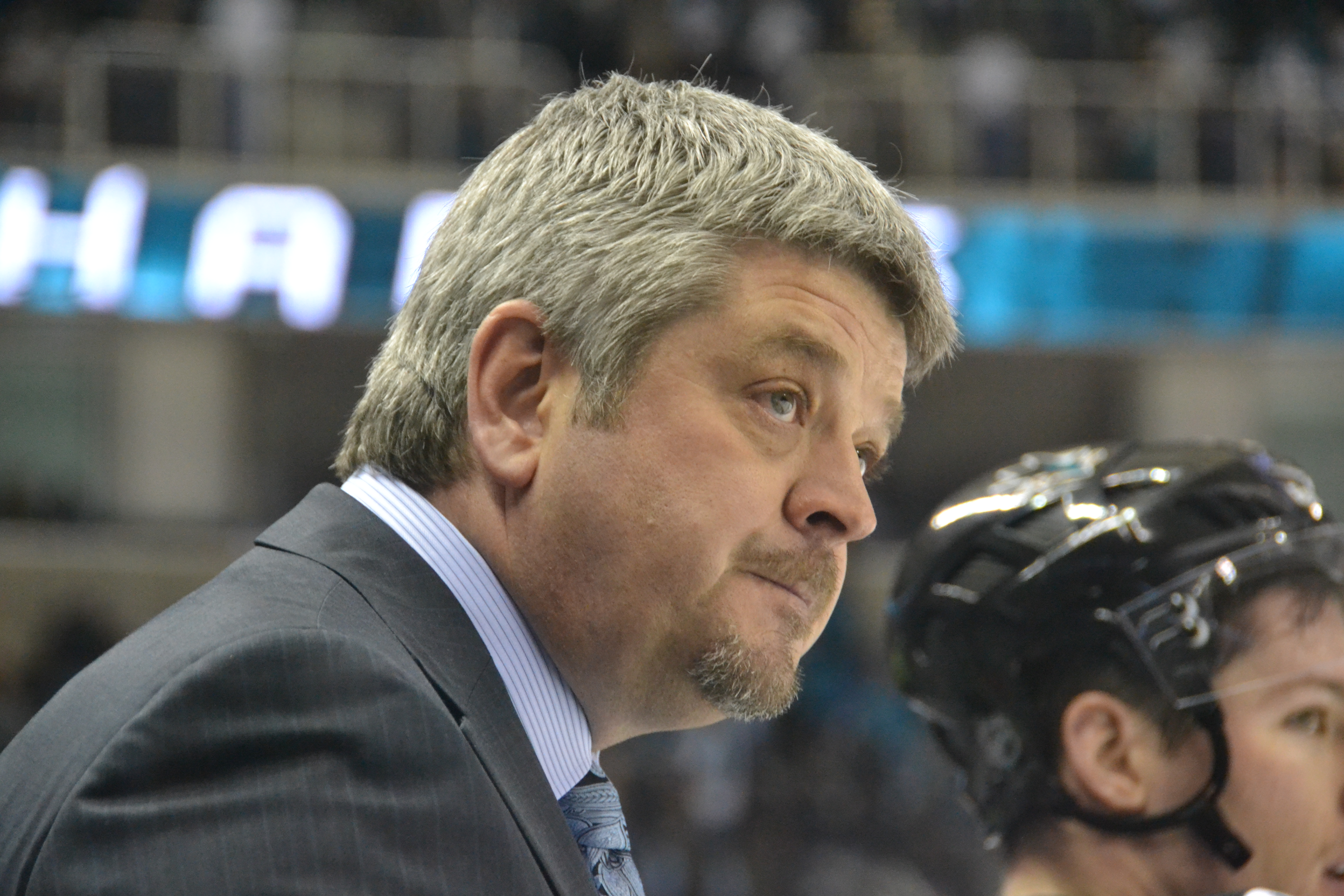
Todd McLellan, Detroit Red Wings

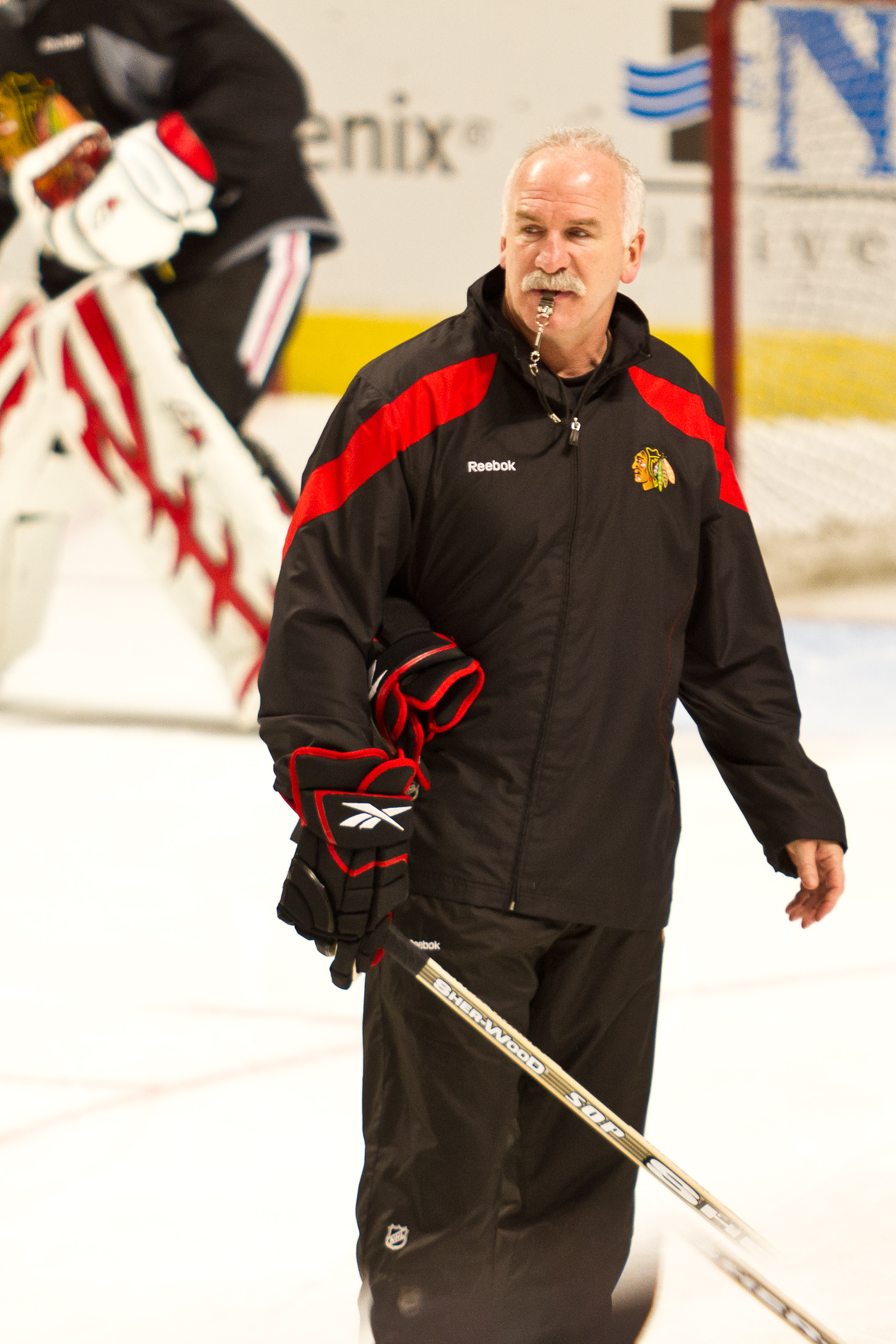
Joel Quenneville, Anaheim Ducks

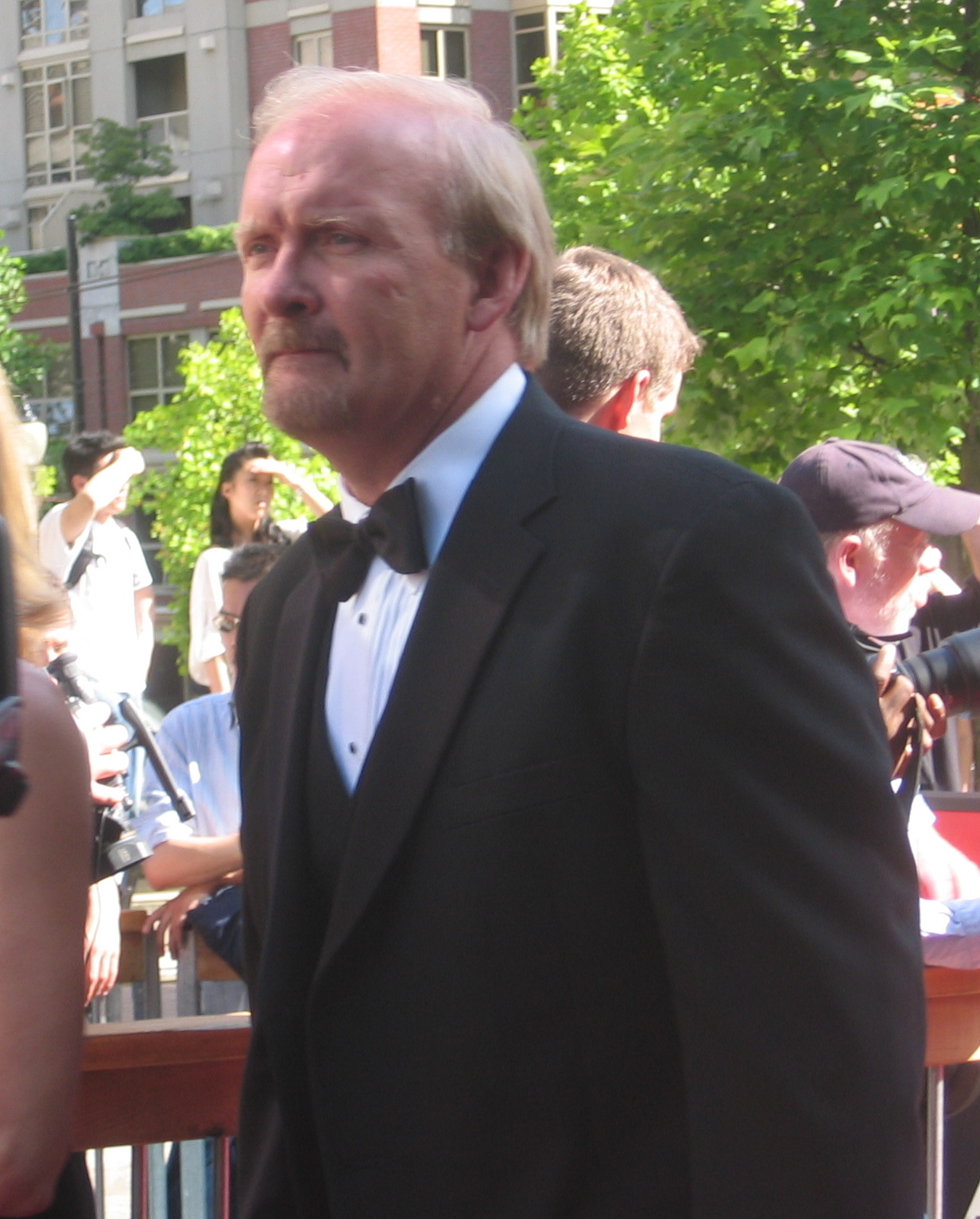
Lindy Ruff, Buffalo Sabres

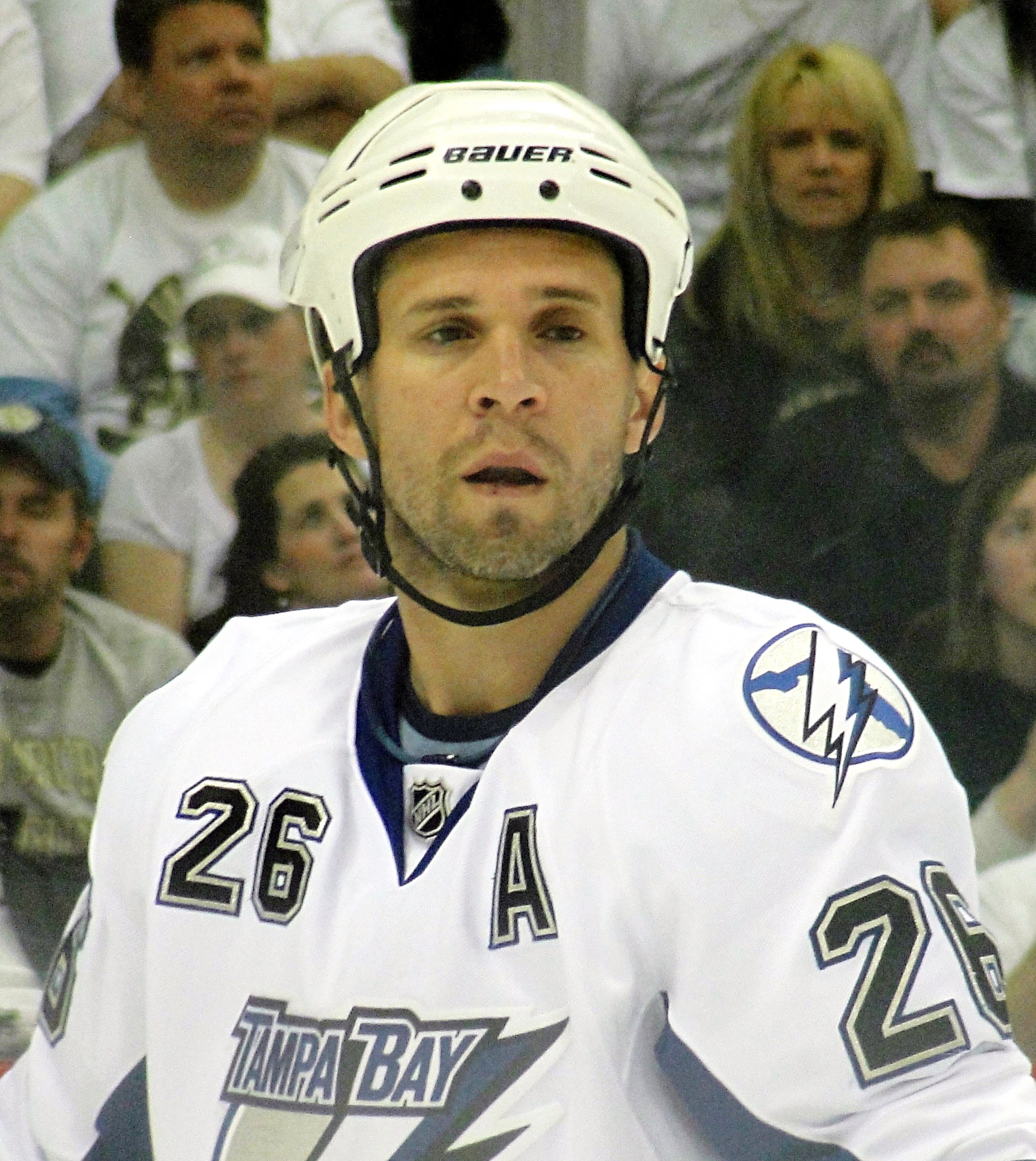
Martin St. Louis, Montreal Canadiens

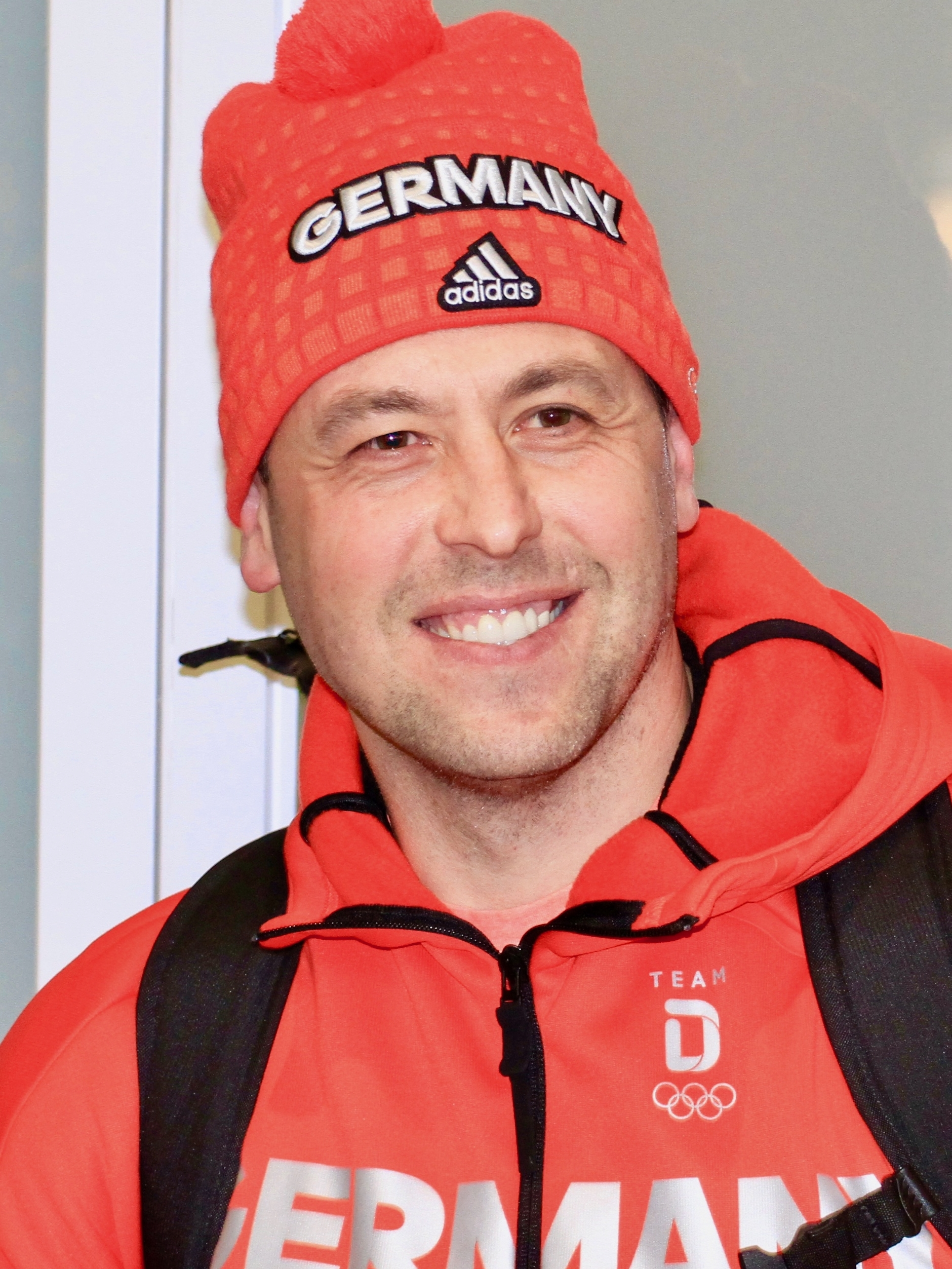
Marco Sturm, Boston Bruins

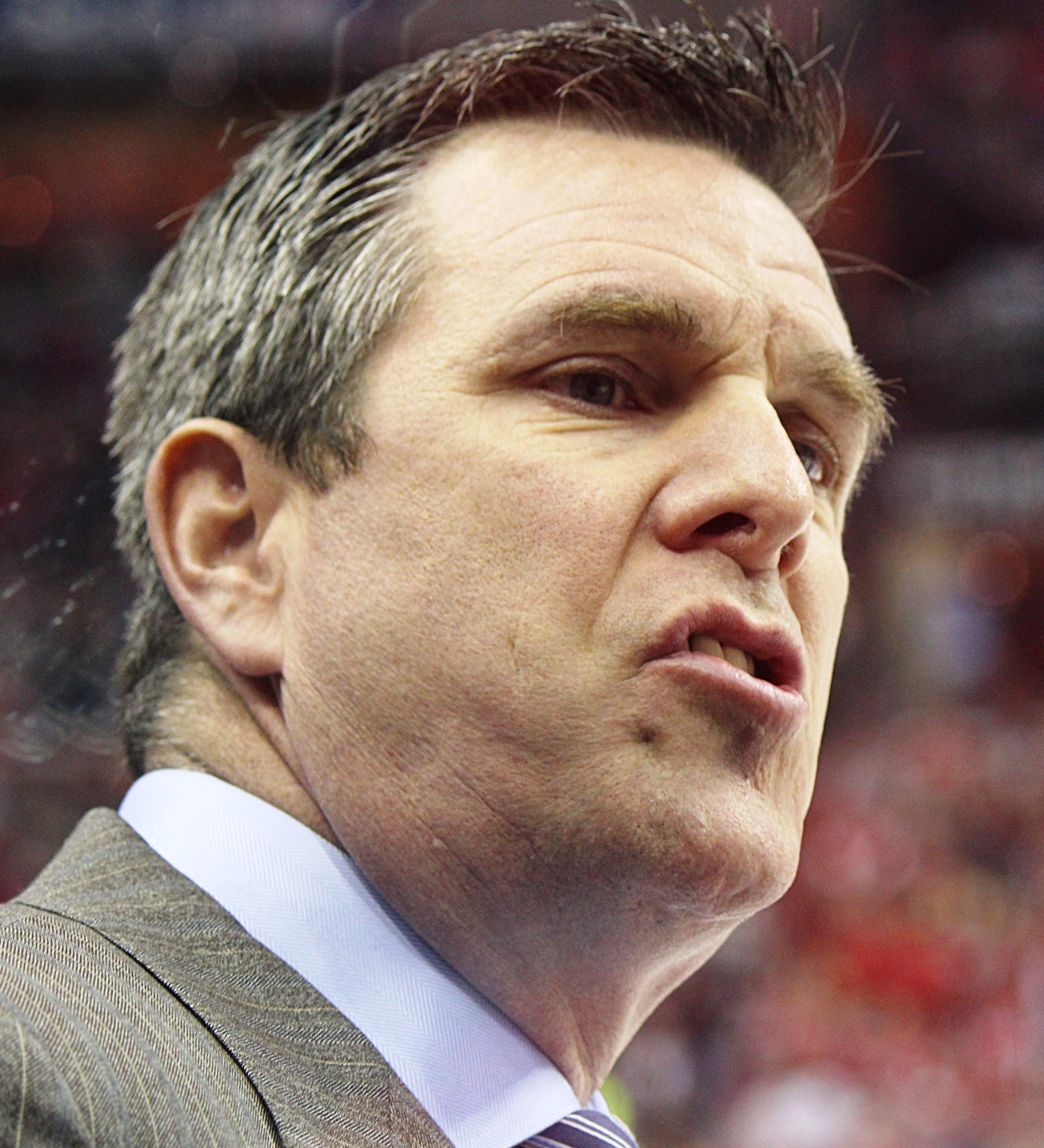
Mike Sullivan, New York Rangers

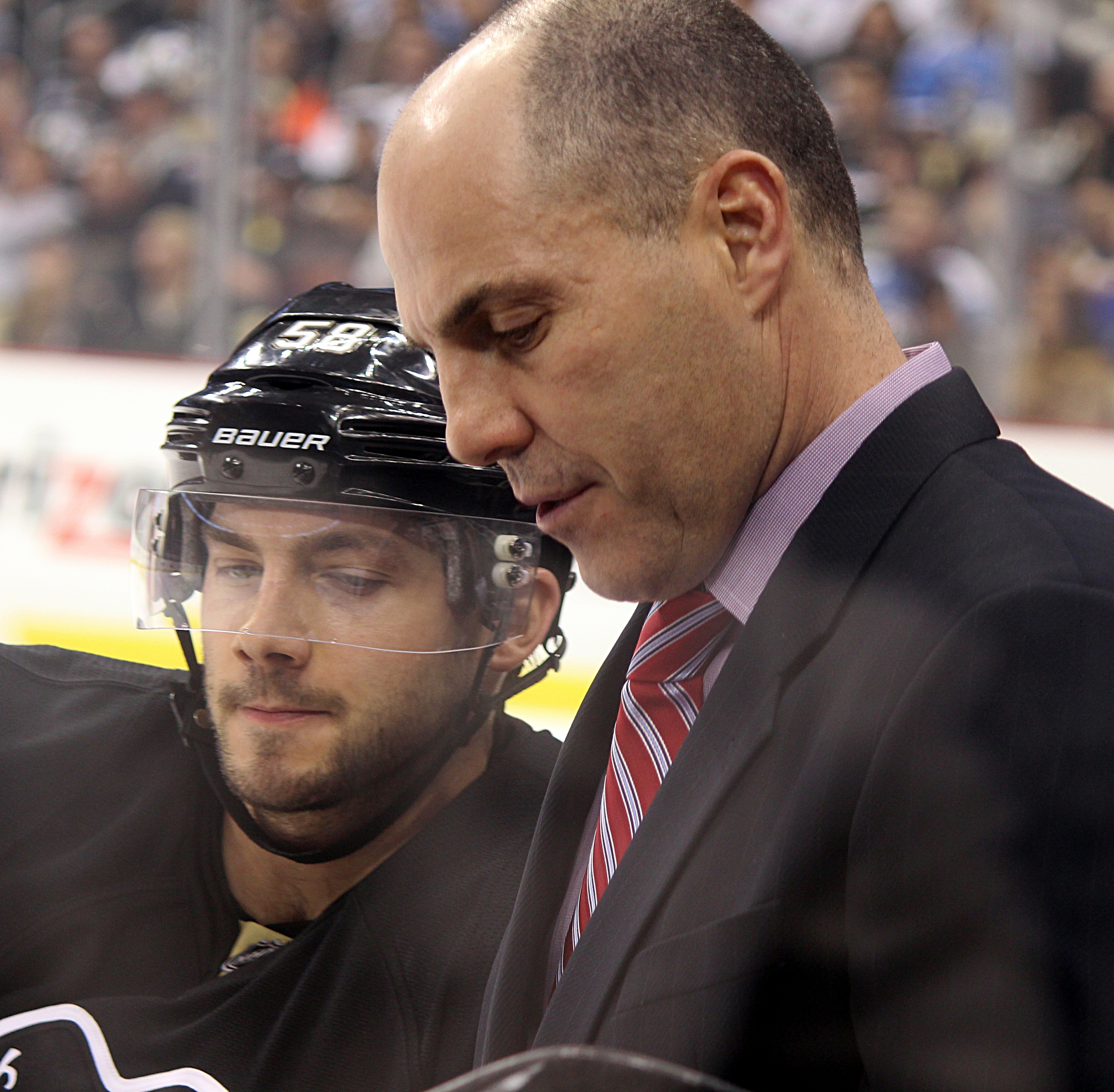
Rick Tocchet, Philadelphia Flyers

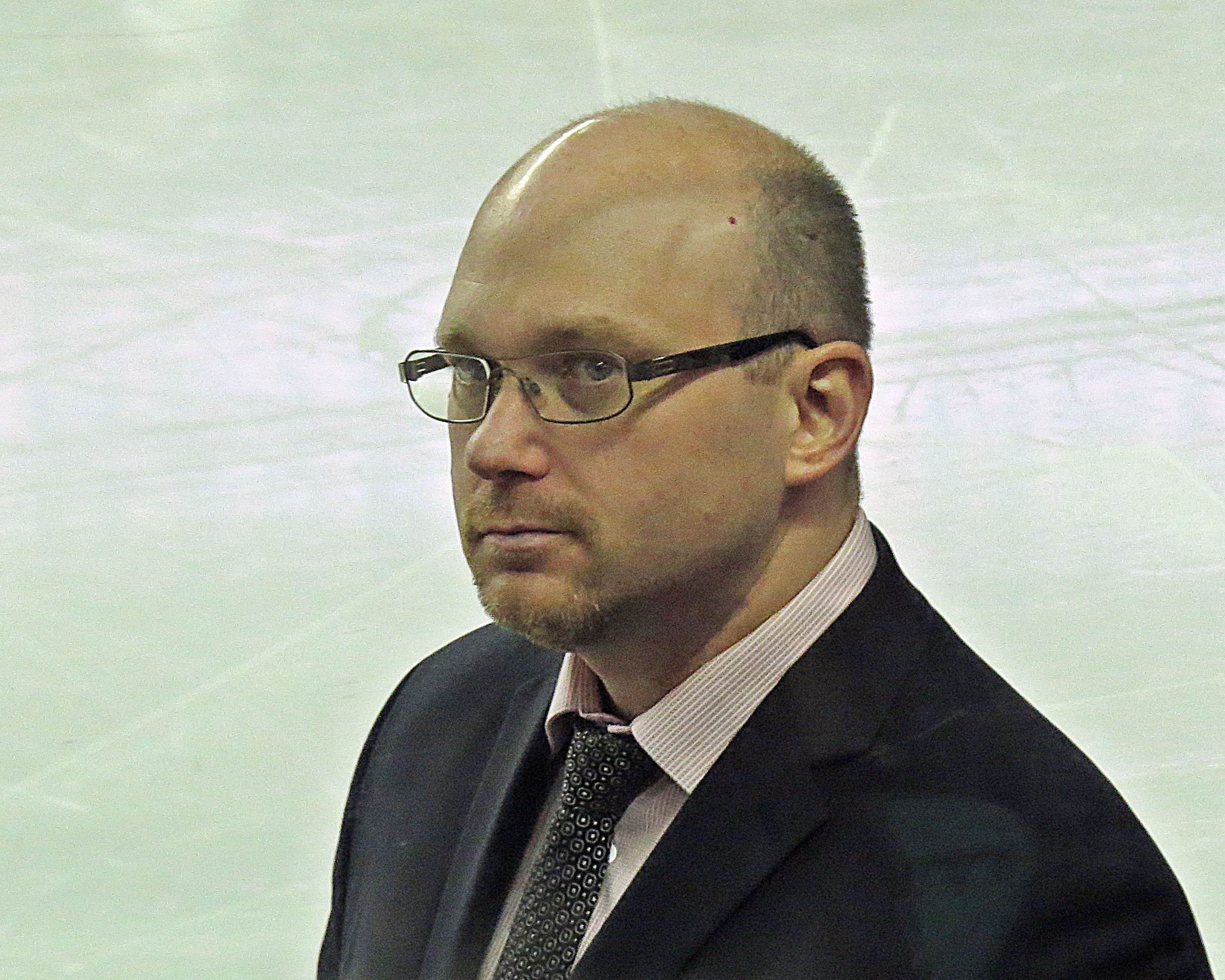
André Tourigny, Utah Mammoth

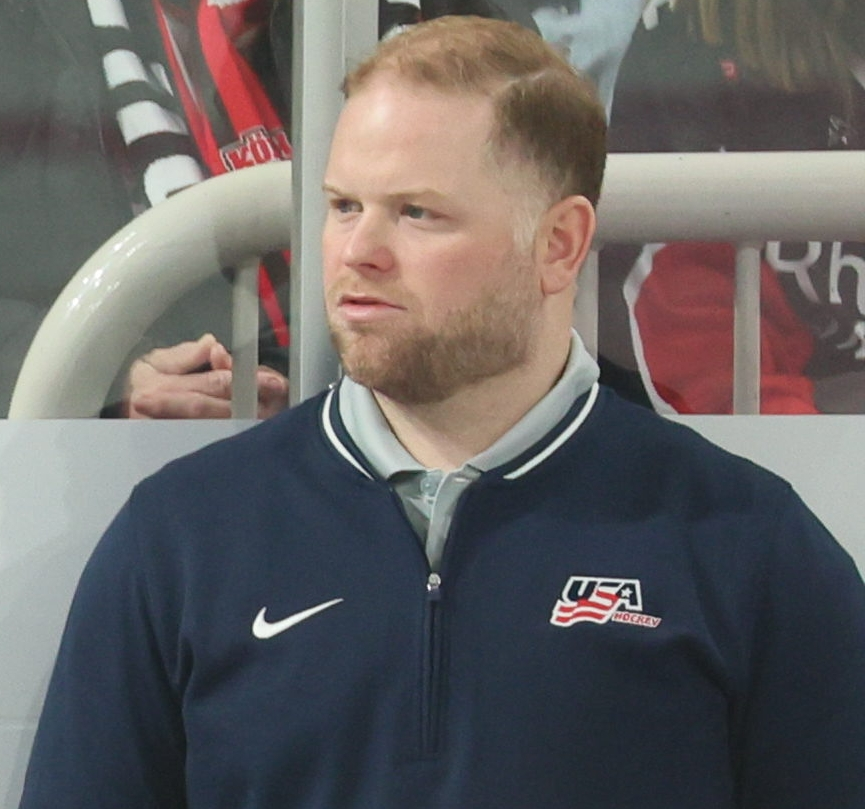
Ryan Warsofsky, San Jose Sharks

== See also ==
- NHL Coaches – statistical leaders
