= List of 2021–22 NHL Three Star Awards =

The 2021–22 NHL Three Star Awards are the way the National Hockey League denotes its players of the week and players of the month of the 2021–22 season.

== Weekly ==
Weekly
Week	First Star	Second Star	Third Star
October 17, 2021	Anze Kopitar (Los Angeles Kings)	Alexander Ovechkin (Washington Capitals)	Steven Stamkos (Tampa Bay Lightning)
October 24, 2021	Kyle Connor (Winnipeg Jets)	Connor McDavid (Edmonton Oilers)	Ilya Sorokin (New York Islanders)
October 31, 2021	Jacob Markstrom (Calgary Flames)	Drake Batherson (Ottawa Senators)	Alex Killorn (Tampa Bay Lightning)
November 7, 2021	Leon Draisaitl (Edmonton Oilers)	Jack Campbell (Toronto Maple Leafs)	John Gibson (Anaheim Ducks)
November 14, 2021	Alexander Ovechkin (Washington Capitals)	Charlie McAvoy (Boston Bruins)	Troy Terry (Anaheim Ducks)
November 21, 2021	Johnny Gaudreau (Calgary Flames)	Ilya Samsonov (Washington Capitals)	Cale Makar (Colorado Avalanche)
November 28, 2021	Alexander Ovechkin (Washington Capitals)	Tristan Jarry (Pittsburgh Penguins)	Cale Makar (Colorado Avalanche)
December 5, 2021	Jonathan Huberdeau (Florida Panthers)	Victor Hedman (Tampa Bay Lightning)	Jake Guentzel (Pittsburgh Penguins)
December 12, 2021	Thatcher Demko (Vancouver Canucks)	Sebastian Aho (Carolina Hurricanes)	Devon Toews (Colorado Avalanche)
December 19, 2021	Dylan Larkin (Detroit Red Wings)	Vladimir Tarasenko (St. Louis Blues)	Nikolaj Ehlers (Winnipeg Jets)
January 2, 2022	Jordan Kyrou (St. Louis Blues)	Jack Hughes (New Jersey Devils)	Jonathan Huberdeau (Florida Panthers)
January 9, 2022	Gabriel Landeskog (Colorado Avalanche)	Juuse Saros (Nashville Predators)	Tomas Hertl (San Jose Sharks)
January 16, 2022	Brad Marchand (Boston Bruins)	Marc-Andre Fleury; Chicago Blackhawks	Nikita Kucherov (Tampa Bay Lightning)
January 23, 2022	Chris Kreider (New York Rangers)	Ville Husso (St. Louis Blues)	Timo Meier (San Jose Sharks)
January 30, 2022	Nazem Kadri (Colorado Avalanche)	Frederik Andersen (Carolina Hurricanes)	Johnny Gaudreau (Calgary Flames)
February 6, 2022	Claude Giroux (Philadelphia Flyers)	Mitch Marner (Toronto Maple Leafs)	Mason Marchment (Florida Panthers)
February 13, 2022	Jacob Markstrom (Calgary Flames)	Patrik Laine (Columbus Blue Jackets)	Nico Hischier (New Jersey Devils)
February 20, 2021	Elias Lindholm (Calgary Flames)	Aaron Ekblad (Florida Panthers)	Jake Oettinger (Dallas Stars)
February 27, 2022	Auston Matthews (Toronto Maple Leafs)	J. T. Miller (Vancouver Canucks)	Steven Stamkos (Tampa Bay Lightning)
March 6, 2022	Jason Robertson (Dallas Stars)	Nick Schmaltz (Arizona Coyotes)	Igor Shesterkin (New York Rangers)
March 13, 2022	Patrick Kane (Chicago Blackhawks)	Jacob Markstrom (Calgary Flames)	Anders Lee (New York Islanders)
March 20, 2022	Roman Josi (Nashville Predators)	Kyle Connor (Winnipeg Jets)	Lawson Crouse (Arizona Coyotes)
March 27, 2022	Cam Talbot (Minnesota Wild)	Johnny Gaudreau (Calgary Flames)	Leon Draisaitl (Edmonton Oilers)
April 3, 2022	Connor McDavid (Edmonton Oilers)	Aleksander Barkov (Florida Panthers)	Semyon Varlamov (New York Islanders)
April 10, 2022	Auston Matthews (Toronto Maple Leafs)	John Carlson (Washington Capitals)	Jonathan Huberdeau (Florida Panthers)
April 17, 2022	Vladimir Tarasenko (St. Louis Blues)	Kevin Fiala (Minnesota Wild)	Mike Smith (Edmonton Oilers)
April 24, 2022	Steven Stamkos (Tampa Bay Lightning)	Kevin Fiala (Minnesota Wild)	Jonathan Quick (Los Angeles Kings)

== Monthly ==
Monthly
Month	First Star	Second Star	Third Star
October	Alexander Ovechkin (Washington Capitals)	Connor McDavid (Edmonton Oilers)	Frederik Andersen (Carolina Hurricanes)
November	Leon Draisaitl (Edmonton Oilers)	Jack Campbell (Toronto Maple Leafs)	Nazem Kadri (Colorado Avalanche)
December	Auston Matthews (Toronto Maple Leafs)	Max Pacioretty (Vegas Golden Knights)	Thatcher Demko (Vancouver Canucks)
January	Jonathan Huberdeau (Florida Panthers)	Juuse Saros (Nashville Predators)	Bryan Rust (Pittsburgh Penguins)
February	Mitch Marner (Toronto Maple Leafs)	Jacob Markstrom (Calgary Flames)	Patrik Laine (Columbus Blue Jackets)
March	Roman Josi (Nashville Predators)	Johnny Gaudreau (Calgary Flames)	Sergei Bobrovsky (Florida Panthers)
April	Steven Stamkos (Tampa Bay Lightning)	Mike Smith (Edmonton Oilers)	Vladimir Tarasenko (St. Louis Blues)

== Rookie of the Month ==
Rookie of the Month
Month	Player
October	Moritz Seider (Detroit Red Wings)
November	Lucas Raymond (Detroit Red Wings)
December	Trevor Zegras (Anaheim Ducks)
January	Anton Lundell (Florida Panthers)
February	Jeremy Swayman (Boston Bruins)
March	Cole Caufield (Montreal Canadiens)
April	Spencer Knight (Florida Panthers)
