= 2021–22 Pittsburgh Penguins season =

NHL team season

2021–22 Pittsburgh Penguins
- Division: 3rd Metropolitan
- Conference: 7th Eastern
- 2021–22 record: 46–25–11
- Home record: 23–13–5
- Road record: 23–12–6
- Goals for: 272
- Goals against: 229

Team information
- General manager: Ron Hextall
- Coach: Mike Sullivan
- Captain: Sidney Crosby
- Alternate captains: Kris Letang; Evgeni Malkin
- Arena: PPG Paints Arena
- Average attendance: 17,684
- Minor league affiliates: Wilkes-Barre/Scranton Penguins (AHL); Wheeling Nailers (ECHL)

Team leaders
- Goals: Jake Guentzel (40)
- Assists: Kris Letang (58)
- Points: Sidney Crosby; Jake Guentzel (84)
- Penalty minutes: Kris Letang (49)
- Plus/minus: Brian Dumoulin (+24)
- Wins: Tristan Jarry (34)
- Goals against average: Louis Domingue (2.02)

The 2021–22 Pittsburgh Penguins season was the 55th season for the National Hockey League team that was established on June 5, 1967.

On March 27, 2022, the Penguins defeated the Red Wings, 11–2, marking the first time the team has scored 11 goals in a game since November 16, 1993. On April 14, 2022, the Penguins clinched their 16th consecutive playoff appearance after a 6–3 win over the New York Islanders. In the First Round, the Penguins lost in seven games to the New York Rangers despite having a 3–1 series lead. This marked the fourth time the Penguins lost a best-of-seven playoff series after having a 3–1 series lead, and the second time doing so against the New York Rangers. The Game 7 loss marked the first time the Penguins lost a Game 7 on the road in franchise history after going 6–0 the previous six instances.

In the first 64 games, the Penguins were 39–16–9 for 87 points. But, after that, they sagged, going 7–9–2. They also lost an NHL-worst 7 shootouts.

Before the season, the Penguins shipped left wing Brandon Tanev off to play for the Seattle Kraken.

== Standings ==
=== Divisional standings ===
Metropolitan Division
Pos	Team	GP	W	L	OTL	RW	GF	GA	GD	Pts
1	y – Carolina Hurricanes	82	54	20	8	47	278	202	+76	116
2	x – New York Rangers	82	52	24	6	44	254	207	+47	110
3	x – Pittsburgh Penguins	82	46	25	11	37	272	229	+43	103
4	x – Washington Capitals	82	44	26	12	35	275	245	+30	100
5	New York Islanders	82	37	35	10	34	231	237	−6	84
6	Columbus Blue Jackets	82	37	38	7	26	262	300	−38	81
7	New Jersey Devils	82	27	46	9	19	248	307	−59	63
8	Philadelphia Flyers	82	25	46	11	20	211	298	−87	61

Source: National Hockey League
Rules for classification: 1) Fewer number of games played (GP, only during regular season); 2) Greater number of regulation wins (RW); 3) Greater number of wins in regulation and overtime, excluding shootout wins (ROW); 4) Greater number of total wins, including shootouts (W); 5) Greater number of points earned in head-to-head play; if teams played an uneven number of head-to-head games, the result of the first game on the home ice of the team with the extra home game is discarded; 6) Greater goal differential (GD); 7) Greater number of goals scored (GF)
x – Clinched playoff spot; y – Clinched division

=== Conference standings ===
Eastern Conference Wild Card
Pos	Div	Team	GP	W	L	OTL	RW	GF	GA	GD	Pts
1	AT	x – Boston Bruins	82	51	26	5	40	255	220	+35	107
2	ME	x – Washington Capitals	82	44	26	12	35	275	245	+30	100
3	ME	New York Islanders	82	37	35	10	34	231	237	−6	84
4	ME	Columbus Blue Jackets	82	37	38	7	26	262	300	−38	81
5	AT	Buffalo Sabres	82	32	39	11	25	232	290	−58	75
6	AT	Detroit Red Wings	82	32	40	10	21	230	312	−82	74
7	AT	Ottawa Senators	82	33	42	7	26	227	266	−39	73
8	ME	New Jersey Devils	82	27	46	9	19	248	307	−59	63
9	ME	Philadelphia Flyers	82	25	46	11	20	211	298	−87	61
10	AT	Montreal Canadiens	82	22	49	11	16	221	319	−98	55

Source: National Hockey League
Rules for classification: 1) Fewer number of games played (GP, only during regular season); 2) Greater number of regulation wins (RW); 3) Greater number of wins in regulation and overtime, excluding shootout wins (ROW); 4) Greater number of total wins, including shootouts (W); 5) Greater number of points earned in head-to-head play; if teams played an uneven number of head-to-head games, the result of the first game on the home ice of the team with the extra home game is discarded; 6) Greater goal differential (GD); 7) Greater number of goals scored (GF)
x – Clinched playoff spot

== Schedule and results ==
=== Regular season ===
The regular season schedule was released on July 22, 2021.

2021–22 game log
October: 3–3–2 (home: 2–3–1; road: 1–0–1)

#	Date	Visitor	Score	Home	Decision	Attendance	Record	Points	Recap
1	October 12	Pittsburgh	6–2	Tampa Bay	Jarry	19,092	1–0–0	2	
2	October 14	Pittsburgh	4–5 OT	Florida	DeSmith	14,308	1–0–1	3	
3	October 16	Chicago	2–5	Pittsburgh	Jarry	18,420	2–0–1	5	
4	October 19	Dallas	2–1 SO	Pittsburgh	Jarry	16,450	2–0–2	6	
5	October 23	Toronto	1–7	Pittsburgh	Jarry	15,397	3–0–2	8	
6	October 26	Tampa Bay	5–1	Pittsburgh	Jarry	15,732	3–1–2	8	
7	October 28	Calgary	4–0	Pittsburgh	DeSmith	17,743	3–2–2	8	
8	October 30	New Jersey	4–2	Pittsburgh	Jarry	17,452	3–3–2	8	

November: 7–4–3 (home: 3–2–1; road: 4–2–2)

#	Date	Visitor	Score	Home	Decision	Attendance	Record	Points	Recap
9	November 4	Philadelphia	2–3 OT	Pittsburgh	Jarry	17,037	4–3–2	10	
10	November 6	Minnesota	5–4 SO	Pittsburgh	Jarry	17,181	4–3–3	11	
11	November 9	Pittsburgh	2–3 SO	Chicago	Jarry	17,736	4–3–4	12	
12	November 11	Florida	2–3 SO	Pittsburgh	Jarry	17,194	5–3–4	14	
13	November 13	Pittsburgh	3–6	Ottawa	DeSmith	14,661	5–4–4	14	
14	November 14	Pittsburgh	1–6	Washington	Jarry	18,573	5–5–4	14	
15	November 16	Buffalo	2–1	Pittsburgh	Jarry	16,366	5–6–4	14	
16	November 18	Pittsburgh	6–0	Montreal	Jarry	20,712	6–6–4	16	
17	November 20	Pittsburgh	2–0	Toronto	Jarry	19,531	7–6–4	18	
18	November 22	Pittsburgh	3–1	Winnipeg	Jarry	13,570	8–6–4	20	
19	November 24	Vancouver	1–4	Pittsburgh	Jarry	17,590	9–6–4	22	
20	November 26	Pittsburgh	1–0	NY Islanders	Jarry	17,255	10–6–4	24	
21	November 27	Montreal	6–3	Pittsburgh	DeSmith	17,985	10–7–4	24	
22	November 29	Pittsburgh	1–2 SO	Calgary	Jarry	15,343	10–7–5	25	

December: 7–1–0 (home: 3–0–0; road: 4–1–0)

#	Date	Visitor	Score	Home	Decision	Attendance	Record	Points	Recap
23	December 1	Pittsburgh	2–5	Edmonton	Jarry	17,130	10–8–5	25	
24	December 4	Pittsburgh	4–1	Vancouver	Jarry	18,422	11–8–5	27	
25	December 6	Pittsburgh	6–1	Seattle	DeSmith	17,151	12–8–5	29	
26	December 10	Pittsburgh	4–2	Washington	Jarry	18,573	13–8–5	31	
27	December 11	Anaheim	0–1	Pittsburgh	DeSmith	17,435	14–8–5	33	
28	December 14	Montreal	2–5	Pittsburgh	Jarry	17,005	15–8–5	35	
29	December 17	Buffalo	2–3 OT	Pittsburgh	Jarry	17,456	16–8–5	37	
30	December 19	Pittsburgh	3–2	New Jersey	Jarry	14,857	17–8–5	39	
—	December 21	New Jersey	–	Pittsburgh	Postponed due to COVID-19.				
—	December 23	Philadelphia	–	Pittsburgh	Postponed due to COVID-19.				
—	December 27	Pittsburgh	–	Boston	Postponed due to COVID-19.				
—	December 29	Pittsburgh	–	Toronto	Postponed due to COVID-19.				
—	December 31	Pittsburgh	–	Ottawa	Postponed due to attendance restrictions.				

January: 10–3–2 (home: 5–1–2; road: 5–2–0)

#	Date	Visitor	Score	Home	Decision	Attendance	Record	Points	Recap
31	January 2	San Jose	5–8	Pittsburgh	DeSmith	18,066	18–8–5	41	
32	January 5	St. Louis	3–5	Pittsburgh	Jarry	17,921	19–8–5	43	
33	January 6	Pittsburgh	6–2	Philadelphia	Jarry	17,944	20–8–5	45	
34	January 8	Pittsburgh	2–3	Dallas	Jarry	18,532	20–9–5	45	
35	January 11	Pittsburgh	4–1	Anaheim	Jarry	11,431	21–9–5	47	
36	January 13	Pittsburgh	2–6	Los Angeles	Jarry	14,348	21–10–5	47	
37	January 15	Pittsburgh	2–1 OT	San Jose	Domingue	13,686	22–10–5	49	
38	January 17	Pittsburgh	5–3	Vegas	Jarry	18,213	23–10–5	51	
39	January 20	Ottawa	4–6	Pittsburgh	Jarry	18,060	24–10–5	53	
40	January 21	Pittsburgh	5–2	Columbus	Jarry	18,477	25–10–5	55	
41	January 23	Winnipeg	2–3 SO	Pittsburgh	Jarry	17,962	26–10–5	57	
42	January 25	Arizona	3–6	Pittsburgh	Jarry	16,360	27–10–5	59	
43	January 27	Seattle	2–1 OT	Pittsburgh	Jarry	18,228	27–10–6	60	
44	January 28	Detroit	3–2 SO	Pittsburgh	DeSmith	18,369	27–10–7	61	
45	January 30	Los Angeles	4–3	Pittsburgh	Jarry	18,237	27–11–7	61	

February: 6–3–1 (home: 2–2–1; road: 4–1–0)

#	Date	Visitor	Score	Home	Decision	Attendance	Record	Points	Recap
46	February 1	Washington	4–3 OT	Pittsburgh	Jarry	17,826	27–11–8	62	
47	February 8	Pittsburgh	4–2	Boston	Jarry	17,850	28–11–8	64	
48	February 10	Pittsburgh	2–0	Ottawa	DeSmith	500	29–11–8	66	
49	February 13	Pittsburgh	4–2	New Jersey	Jarry	11,242	30–11–8	68	
50	February 15	Philadelphia	4–5 OT	Pittsburgh	DeSmith	18,385	31–11–8	70	
51	February 17	Pittsburgh	1–4	Toronto	Jarry	8,139	31–12–8	70	
52	February 20	Carolina	4–3	Pittsburgh	Jarry	18,429	31–13–8	70	
53	February 24	New Jersey	6–1	Pittsburgh	Jarry	18,057	31–14–8	70	
54	February 26	NY Rangers	0–1	Pittsburgh	Jarry	18,413	32–14–8	72	
55	February 27	Pittsburgh	3–2	Columbus	DeSmith	17,072	33–14–8	74	

March: 8–4–2 (home: 4–2–0; road: 4–2–2)

#	Date	Visitor	Score	Home	Decision	Attendance	Record	Points	Recap
56	March 3	Pittsburgh	5–1	Tampa Bay	Jarry	19,092	34–14–8	76	
57	March 4	Pittsburgh	2–3 OT	Carolina	DeSmith	19,023	34–14–9	77	
58	March 8	Florida	4–3	Pittsburgh	Jarry	17,876	34–15–9	77	
59	March 11	Vegas	2–5	Pittsburgh	Jarry	18,341	35–15–9	79	
60	March 13	Carolina	2–4	Pittsburgh	Jarry	17,866	36–15–9	81	
61	March 15	Pittsburgh	1–4	Nashville	DeSmith	17,498	36–16–9	81	
62	March 17	Pittsburgh	3–2 SO	St. Louis	Jarry	18,096	37–16–9	83	
63	March 19	Pittsburgh	4–1	Arizona	Jarry	14,507	38–16–9	85	
64	March 22	Columbus	1–5	Pittsburgh	Jarry	18,196	39–16–9	87	
65	March 23	Pittsburgh	3–4 SO	Buffalo	DeSmith	9,399	39–16–10	88	
66	March 25	Pittsburgh	1–5	NY Rangers	Jarry	18,006	39–17–10	88	
67	March 27	Detroit	2–11	Pittsburgh	Jarry	17,842	40–17–10	90	
68	March 29	NY Rangers	3–2	Pittsburgh	Jarry	18,011	40–18–10	90	
69	March 31	Pittsburgh	4–3 OT	Minnesota	DeSmith	18,978	41–18–10	92	

April: 5–7–1 (home: 4–3–0; road: 1–4–1)

#	Date	Visitor	Score	Home	Decision	Attendance	Record	Points	Recap
70	April 2	Pittsburgh	2–3	Colorado	Jarry	18,102	41–19–10	92	
71	April 5	Colorado	6–4	Pittsburgh	Jarry	17,409	41–20–10	92	
72	April 7	Pittsburgh	0–3	NY Rangers	Jarry	16,694	41–21–10	92	
73	April 9	Washington	6–3	Pittsburgh	Jarry	18,404	41–22–10	92	
74	April 10	Nashville	2–3 OT	Pittsburgh	DeSmith	17,553	42–22–10	94	
75	April 12	Pittsburgh	4–5 SO	NY Islanders	DeSmith	15,924	42–22–11	95	
76	April 14	NY Islanders	3–6	Pittsburgh	Jarry	18,236	43–22–11	97	
77	April 16	Pittsburgh	1–2	Boston	DeSmith	17,850	43–23–11	97	
78	April 21	Boston	0–4	Pittsburgh	DeSmith	18,350	44–23–11	99	
79	April 23	Pittsburgh	7–2	Detroit	DeSmith	19,515	45–23–11	101	
80	April 24	Pittsburgh	1–4	Philadelphia	Domingue	18,601	45–24–11	101	
81	April 26	Edmonton	5–1	Pittsburgh	DeSmith	17,804	45–25–11	101	
82	April 29	Columbus	3–5	Pittsburgh	DeSmith	18,402	46–25–11	103	

Legend: = Win = Loss = OT/SO Loss

=== Playoffs ===
2022 Stanley Cup playoffs
Eastern Conference First Round vs. (M2) New York Rangers: New York won 4–3

#	Date	Visitor	Score	Home	OT	Decision	Attendance	Series	Recap
1	May 3	Pittsburgh	4–3	NY Rangers	3OT	Domingue	18,006	1–0	
2	May 5	Pittsburgh	2–5	NY Rangers		Domingue	18,006	1–1	
3	May 7	NY Rangers	4–7	Pittsburgh		Domingue	18,385	2–1	
4	May 9	NY Rangers	2–7	Pittsburgh		Domingue	18,392	3–1	
5	May 11	Pittsburgh	3–5	NY Rangers		Domingue	18,006	3–2	
6	May 13	NY Rangers	5–3	Pittsburgh		Domingue	18,342	3–3	
7	May 15	Pittsburgh	3–4	NY Rangers	OT	Jarry	18,006	3–4	

Legend: = Win = Loss

== Player statistics ==
Skaters

Regular season
Player	GP	G	A	Pts	+/−	PIM
Jake Guentzel	76	40	44	84	13	44
Sidney Crosby	69	31	53	84	19	32
Kris Letang	78	10	58	68	20	49
Bryan Rust	60	24	34	58	7	14
Jeff Carter	76	19	26	45	-8	38
Evan Rodrigues	82	19	24	43	3	14
Evgeni Malkin	41	20	22	42	-10	24
Danton Heinen	76	18	15	33	6	16
Kasperi Kapanen	79	11	21	32	2	16
Mike Matheson	74	11	20	31	12	33
Teddy Blueger	65	9	19	28	12	10
John Marino	81	1	24	25	1	23
Brock McGinn	64	12	10	22	0	14
Brian Boyle	66	11	10	21	6	27
Marcus Pettersson	72	2	17	19	8	38
Brian Dumoulin	76	3	15	18	24	24
Jason Zucker	41	8	9	17	-2	15
Rickard Rakell^{†}	19	4	9	13	7	4
Chad Ruhwedel	78	4	9	13	2	14
Zach Aston-Reese^{‡}	52	2	9	11	8	22
Dominik Simon^{‡}	55	3	6	9	0	28
Radim Zohorna	17	2	4	6	12	4
Drew O'Connor	22	3	2	5	-1	4
Mark Friedman	26	1	4	5	1	23
Sam Lafferty^{‡}	10	0	2	2	0	16
Kasper Bjorkqvist	6	1	0	1	-1	2
Juuso Riikola	5	0	1	1	2	2
Valtteri Puustinen	1	0	1	1	2	0
Anthony Angello	4	0	0	0	0	2
Pierre-Olivier Joseph	4	0	0	0	-2	2
Filip Hallander	1	0	0	0	0	0
Total		269	468	737	—	554

Playoffs
Player	GP	G	A	Pts	+/−	PIM
Jake Guentzel	7	8	2	10	1	2
Sidney Crosby	6	2	8	10	2	2
Bryan Rust	7	2	6	8	1	4
Evgeni Malkin	7	3	3	6	2	6
Mike Matheson	7	1	5	6	-1	6
Jeff Carter	7	4	1	5	-6	6
Evan Rodrigues	7	3	2	5	-2	4
Kris Letang	7	1	3	4	-3	0
Danton Heinen	7	3	0	3	-1	4
Kasperi Kapanen	7	0	3	3	4	2
Brock McGinn	7	1	1	2	1	4
Brian Boyle	6	0	2	2	-1	0
Jason Zucker	5	0	2	2	-3	2
Marcus Pettersson	7	0	2	2	3	2
Mark Friedman	6	1	0	1	3	0
Teddy Blueger	7	0	1	1	0	2
John Marino	7	0	1	1	2	2
Brian Dumoulin	1	0	0	0	0	0
Rickard Rakell	2	0	0	0	0	0
Chad Ruhwedel	7	0	0	0	2	0
Drew O'Connor	2	0	0	0	-2	0
Total		29	42	71	—	48

Goaltenders

Regular season
Player	GP	GS	TOI	W	L	OT	GA	GAA	SA	SV%	SO	G	A	PIM
Tristan Jarry	58	56	3415:11	34	18	6	138	2.42	1711	0.919	4	0	2	2
Casey DeSmith	26	24	1418:09	11	6	5	66	2.79	769	0.914	3	0	0	0
Louis Domingue	2	2	118:45	1	1	0	4	2.02	83	0.952	0	0	0	0
Total		82	4952:05	46	25	11	208	2.52	2563	0.919	7	0	2	2

Playoffs
Player	GP	GS	TOI	W	L	OT	GA	GAA	SA	SV%	SO	G	A	PIM
Louis Domingue	6	5	312:01	3	3	0	19	3.65	187	0.898	0	0	1	0
Casey DeSmith	1	1	89:07	0	0	0	3	2.02	51	0.941	0	0	0	0
Tristan Jarry	1	1	64:46	0	1	0	4	3.71	30	0.867	0	0	0	0
Total		7	465:54	3	4	0	26	3.35	268	0.903	0	0	1	0

^{†}Denotes player spent time with another team before joining the Penguins. Stats reflect time with the Penguins only.
^{‡}Denotes player was traded mid-season. Stats reflect time with the Penguins only.

== Awards and records ==
- Sidney Crosby became the first person to play 1,100 games for the Pittsburgh Penguins. He set the mark in a game against the Nashville Predators on April 10.
- Kris Letang became the first defenseman to record 600 points for the Pittsburgh Penguins. He set the mark in a 5–2 win over the Montreal Canadiens on December 14.
- Kris Letang became the first defenseman to record 500 assists for the Pittsburgh Penguins. He set the mark in a 4–3 win over the Minnesota Wild on March 31.

== Transactions ==
The Penguins have been involved in the following transactions during the 2021–22 season.

=== Trades ===
Date	Details		Ref
July 17, 2021	To Toronto Maple Leafs Jared McCann	To Pittsburgh Penguins Filip Hallander; 7th-round pick in 2023	
January 5, 2022	To Chicago Blackhawks Sam Lafferty	To Pittsburgh Penguins Alexander Nylander	
March 21, 2022	To Anaheim Ducks Zach Aston-Reese; Dominik Simon; Calle Clang; 2nd-round pick in 2022	To Pittsburgh Penguins Rickard Rakell	
March 21, 2022	To Winnipeg Jets Conditional^{1}7th-round pick in 2022	To Pittsburgh Penguins Nathan Beaulieu	

Notes:

1. Pittsburgh receives the pick if they reach the 2022 Stanley Cup Finals and Beaulieu plays in at least 50% of the playoff games.

=== Players acquired ===
Date	Player	Former team	Term	Via	Ref
July 28, 2021	Taylor Fedun	Dallas Stars	1-year	Free agency	
July 28, 2021	Brock McGinn	Carolina Hurricanes	4-year	Free agency	
July 28, 2021	Dominik Simon	Calgary Flames	1-year	Free agency	
July 29, 2021	Michael Chaput	Arizona Coyotes	1-year	Free agency	
July 29, 2021	Danton Heinen	Anaheim Ducks	1-year	Free agency	
September 2, 2021	Louis Domingue	Calgary Flames	1-year	Free agency	
October 12, 2021	Brian Boyle		1-year	Free agency	
March 1, 2022	Jordan Frasca	Kingston Frontenacs (OHL)	3-year	Free agency	
March 1, 2022	Taylor Gauthier	Portland Winterhawks (WHL)	3-year	Free agency	
March 10, 2022	Corey Andonovski	Princeton Tigers (ECAC)	2-year	Free agency	
March 28, 2022	Colin Swoyer	Michigan Tech Huskies (CCHA)	1-year	Free agency	

=== Players lost ===
Date	Player	New team	Term	Via	Ref
July 20, 2021	Yannick Weber			Retirement	
July 21, 2021	Brandon Tanev	Seattle Kraken		Expansion draft	
July 28, 2021	Cody Ceci	Edmonton Oilers	4-year	Free agency	
July 28, 2021	Frederick Gaudreau	Minnesota Wild	2-year	Free agency	
July 28, 2021	Maxime Lagace	Tampa Bay Lightning	1-year	Free agency	
July 29, 2021	Kevin Czuczman	Minnesota Wild	1-year	Free agency	
July 30, 2021	Sam Miletic	Carolina Hurricanes	1-year	Free agency	
October 13, 2021	Colton Sceviour	Edmonton Oilers	1-year	Free agency	
October 16, 2021	Mark Jankowski	Rochester Americans (AHL)	1-year	Free agency	
May 25, 2022	Juuso Riikola	IK Oskarshamn (SHL)	1-year	Free agency	
June 28, 2022	Kasper Bjorkqvist	Oulun Kärpät (Liiga)	2-year	Free agency	

=== Signings ===
Date	Player	Term	Contract type	Ref
July 14, 2021	Teddy Blueger	2-year	Re-signing	
July 24, 2021	Kasper Bjorkqvist	1-year	Re-signing	
July 28, 2021	Evan Rodrigues	1-year	Re-signing	
July 28, 2021	Filip Lindberg	2-year	Entry-level	
August 3, 2021	Radim Zohorna	2-year	Re-signing	
August 5, 2021	Zach Aston-Reese	1-year	Re-signing	
January 26, 2022	Jeff Carter	2-year	Extension	
February 19, 2022	Chad Ruhwedel	2-year	Extension	
March 12, 2022	Drew O'Connor	1-year	Extension	
March 20, 2022	Mark Friedman	2-year	Extension	
April 5, 2022	Lukas Svejkovsky	3-year	Entry-level	
May 2, 2022	Raivis Ansons	3-year	Entry-level	
May 21, 2022	Bryan Rust	6-year	Extension	
May 25, 2022	Taylor Fedun	2-year	Extension	
July 5, 2022	Casey DeSmith	2-year	Extension	

== Draft picks ==
Below are the Pittsburgh Penguins' selections at the 2021 NHL entry draft, which were held on July 23 to 24, 2021. It was held virtually via Video conference call from the NHL Network studio in Secaucus, New Jersey.

Round	#	Player	Pos.	Nationality	Team (League)
2	58	Tristan Broz	C	USA	Fargo Force (USHL)
5	154	Isaac Belliveau	D	Canada	Gatineau Olympiques (QMJHL)
7	194	Ryan McCleary	D	Canada	Portland Winterhawks (WHL)
7	215	Daniel Laatsch	D	USA	Sioux City Musketeers (USHL)
7	218	Kirill Tankov	C	Russia	SKA Varyagi (MHL)
