= 2021–22 Boston Bruins season =

Season of ice hockey team

2021–22 Boston Bruins
- Division: 4th Atlantic
- Conference: 6th Eastern
- 2021–22 record: 51–26–5
- Home record: 26–13–2
- Road record: 25–13–3
- Goals for: 255
- Goals against: 220

Team information
- General manager: Don Sweeney
- Coach: Bruce Cassidy
- Captain: Patrice Bergeron
- Alternate captains: Brad Marchand; Rotating
- Arena: TD Garden
- Average attendance: 17,850
- Minor league affiliates: Providence Bruins (AHL); Maine Mariners (ECHL)

Team leaders
- Goals: David Pastrnak (40)
- Assists: Brad Marchand (48)
- Points: Brad Marchand (80)
- Penalty minutes: Brad Marchand (97)
- Plus/minus: Charlie McAvoy (+31)
- Wins: Linus Ullmark (26)
- Goals against average: Jeremy Swayman (2.41)

The 2021–22 Boston Bruins season was the 98th season for the National Hockey League (NHL) franchise that was established on November 1, 1924. The Bruins returned to the Atlantic Division after playing in the East Division in 2020–21, due to the Canadian government's COVID-19 border restrictions. On April 16, 2022, the Bruins clinched a playoff spot after a 2–1 win against the Pittsburgh Penguins. They were eliminated in the first round of the playoffs by the Carolina Hurricanes, in seven games.

== Standings ==
=== Divisional standings ===
Atlantic Division
Pos	Team	GP	W	L	OTL	RW	GF	GA	GD	Pts
1	p – Florida Panthers	82	58	18	6	42	340	246	+94	122
2	x – Toronto Maple Leafs	82	54	21	7	45	315	253	+62	115
3	x – Tampa Bay Lightning	82	51	23	8	39	287	233	+54	110
4	x – Boston Bruins	82	51	26	5	40	255	220	+35	107
5	Buffalo Sabres	82	32	39	11	25	232	290	−58	75
6	Detroit Red Wings	82	32	40	10	21	230	312	−82	74
7	Ottawa Senators	82	33	42	7	26	227	266	−39	73
8	Montreal Canadiens	82	22	49	11	16	221	319	−98	55

Source: National Hockey League
Rules for classification: 1) Fewer number of games played (GP, only during regular season); 2) Greater number of regulation wins (RW); 3) Greater number of wins in regulation and overtime, excluding shootout wins (ROW); 4) Greater number of total wins, including shootouts (W); 5) Greater number of points earned in head-to-head play; if teams played an uneven number of head-to-head games, the result of the first game on the home ice of the team with the extra home game is discarded; 6) Greater goal differential (GD); 7) Greater number of goals scored (GF)
p – Clinched Presidents' Trophy; x – Clinched playoff spot

=== Eastern Conference ===
Eastern Conference Wild Card
Pos	Div	Team	GP	W	L	OTL	RW	GF	GA	GD	Pts
1	AT	x – Boston Bruins	82	51	26	5	40	255	220	+35	107
2	ME	x – Washington Capitals	82	44	26	12	35	275	245	+30	100
3	ME	New York Islanders	82	37	35	10	34	231	237	−6	84
4	ME	Columbus Blue Jackets	82	37	38	7	26	262	300	−38	81
5	AT	Buffalo Sabres	82	32	39	11	25	232	290	−58	75
6	AT	Detroit Red Wings	82	32	40	10	21	230	312	−82	74
7	AT	Ottawa Senators	82	33	42	7	26	227	266	−39	73
8	ME	New Jersey Devils	82	27	46	9	19	248	307	−59	63
9	ME	Philadelphia Flyers	82	25	46	11	20	211	298	−87	61
10	AT	Montreal Canadiens	82	22	49	11	16	221	319	−98	55

Source: National Hockey League
Rules for classification: 1) Fewer number of games played (GP, only during regular season); 2) Greater number of regulation wins (RW); 3) Greater number of wins in regulation and overtime, excluding shootout wins (ROW); 4) Greater number of total wins, including shootouts (W); 5) Greater number of points earned in head-to-head play; if teams played an uneven number of head-to-head games, the result of the first game on the home ice of the team with the extra home game is discarded; 6) Greater goal differential (GD); 7) Greater number of goals scored (GF)
x – Clinched playoff spot

== Schedule and results ==
=== Regular season ===
2021–22 game log

October: 4–3–0 (home: 3–0–0; road: 1–3–0)
#	Date	Visitor	Score	Home	OT	Decision	Attendance	Record	Pts	Recap
1	October 16	Dallas	1–3	Boston		Swayman	17,850	1–0–0	2
2	October 20	Boston	3–6	Philadelphia		Swayman	15,310	1–1–0	2
3	October 22	Boston	4–1	Buffalo		Ullmark	7,820	2–1–0	4
4	October 24	San Jose	3–4	Boston		Ullmark	17,850	3–1–0	6
5	October 27	Boston	1–4	Florida		Ullmark	12,306	3–2–0	6
6	October 28	Boston	0–3	Carolina		Swayman	16,093	3–3–0	6
7	October 30	Florida	2–3	Boston	SO	Ullmark	17,850	4–3–0	8

November: 7–5–0 (home: 4–4–0; road: 3–1–0)
#	Date	Visitor	Score	Home	OT	Decision	Attendance	Record	Pts	Recap
8	November 4	Detroit	1–5	Boston		Swayman	17,850	5–3–0	10
9	November 6	Boston	2–5	Toronto		Ullmark	19,077	5–4–0	10
10	November 9	Ottawa	2–3	Boston		Swayman	17,850	6–4–0	12
11	November 11	Edmonton	5–3	Boston		Ullmark	17,850	6–5–0	12
12	November 13	Boston	5–2	New Jersey		Swayman	16,514	7–5–0	14
13	November 14	Montreal	2–5	Boston		Swayman	17,850	8–5–0	16
14	November 20	Boston	5–2	Philadelphia		Ullmark	19,644	9–5–0	18
15	November 21	Calgary	4–0	Boston		Swayman	17,850	9–6–0	18
16	November 24	Boston	5–1	Buffalo		Swayman	9,416	10–6–0	20
17	November 26	NY Rangers	5–2	Boston		Swayman	17,850	10–7–0	20
18	November 28	Vancouver	2–3	Boston		Ullmark	17,850	11–7–0	22
19	November 30	Detroit	2–1	Boston		Ullmark	17,850	11–8–0	22

December: 3–2–2 (home: 0–1–1; road: 3–1–1)
#	Date	Visitor	Score	Home	OT	Decision	Attendance	Record	Pts	Recap
20	December 2	Boston	2–0	Nashville		Swayman	17,159	12–8–0	24
21	December 4	Tampa Bay	3–2	Boston	OT	Swayman	17,850	12–8–1	25
22	December 8	Boston	1–2	Vancouver	SO	Swayman	18,403	12–8–2	26
23	December 9	Boston	3–2	Edmonton		Ullmark	16,112	13–8–2	28
24	December 11	Boston	4–2	Calgary		Ullmark	16,190	14–8–2	30
25	December 14	Vegas	4–1	Boston		Swayman	17,850	14–9–2	30
26	December 16	Boston	1–3	NY Islanders		Ullmark	17,255	14–10–2	30
—	December 18	Boston	–	Montreal	Postponed due to COVID-19.
—	December 19	Boston	–	Ottawa	Postponed due to COVID-19.
—	December 21	Carolina	–	Boston	Postponed due to COVID-19.
—	December 23	Colorado	–	Boston	Postponed due to COVID-19.
—	December 27	Pittsburgh	–	Boston	Postponed due to COVID-19.
—	December 29	Boston	–	Ottawa	Postponed due to COVID-19.

January: 11–4–1 (home: 7–3–0; road: 4–1–1)
#	Date	Visitor	Score	Home	OT	Decision	Attendance	Record	Pts	Recap
27	January 1	Buffalo	3–4	Boston	OT	Ullmark	17,850	15–10–2	32
28	January 2	Boston	5–1	Detroit		Swayman	17,973	16–10–2	34
29	January 4	New Jersey	3–5	Boston		Ullmark	17,850	17–10–2	36
30	January 6	Minnesota	3–2	Boston		Swayman	17,850	17–11–2	36
31	January 8	Boston	5–2	Tampa Bay		Ullmark	19,092	18–11–2	38
32	January 10	Boston	7–3	Washington		Ullmark	18,573	19–11–2	40
33	January 12	Montreal	1–5	Boston		Ullmark	17,850	20–11–2	42
34	January 13	Philadelphia	2–3	Boston		Rask	17,850	21–11–2	44
35	January 15	Nashville	3–4	Boston	OT	Ullmark	17,850	22–11–2	46
36	January 18	Carolina	7–1	Boston		Rask	17,850	22–12–2	46
37	January 20	Washington	3–4	Boston		Ullmark	17,850	23–12–2	48
38	January 22	Winnipeg	2–3	Boston		Rask	17,850	24–12–2	50
39	January 24	Anaheim	5–3	Boston		Rask	17,850	24–13–2	50
40	January 26	Boston	3–4	Colorado	OT	Ullmark	18,041	24–13–3	51
41	January 28	Boston	2–1	Arizona		Ullmark	12,994	25–13–3	53
42	January 30	Boston	1–6	Dallas		Ullmark	17,954	25–14–3	53

February: 7–3–1 (home: 2–2–0; road: 5–1–1)
#	Date	Visitor	Score	Home	OT	Decision	Attendance	Record	Pts	Recap
43	February 1	Seattle	2–3	Boston		Ullmark	17,850	26–14–3	55
44	February 8	Pittsburgh	4–2	Boston		Swayman	17,850	26–15–3	55
45	February 10	Carolina	6–0	Boston		Ullmark	17,850	26–16–3	55
46	February 12	Boston	2–0	Ottawa		Swayman	500	27–16–3	57
47	February 15	Boston	1–2	NY Rangers	SO	Swayman	15,403	27–16–4	58
48	February 17	Boston	1–4	NY Islanders		Ullmark	16,518	27–17–4	58
49	February 19	Boston	3–2	Ottawa	OT	Swayman	5,212	28–17–4	60
50	February 21	Colorado	1–5	Boston		Swayman	17,850	29–17–4	62
51	February 24	Boston	3–2	Seattle	OT	Ullmark	17,151	30–17–4	64
52	February 26	Boston	3–1	San Jose		Swayman	17,260	31–17–4	66
53	February 28	Boston	7–0	Los Angeles		Swayman	16,067	32–17–4	68

March: 10–3–1 (home: 5–1–1; road: 5–2–0)
#	Date	Visitor	Score	Home	OT	Decision	Attendance	Record	Pts	Recap
54	March 1	Boston	3–4	Anaheim		Ullmark	11,567	32–18–4	68
55	March 3	Boston	5–2	Vegas		Swayman	18,109	33–18–4	70
56	March 5	Boston	5–4	Columbus	SO	Swayman	19,434	34–18–4	72
57	March 7	Los Angeles	3–2	Boston	OT	Ullmark	17,850	34–18–5	73
58	March 10	Chicago	3–4	Boston		Swayman	17,850	35–18–5	75
59	March 12	Arizona	2–3	Boston		Swayman	17,850	36–18–5	77
60	March 15	Boston	2–1	Chicago	OT	Ullmark	19,629	37–18–5	79
61	March 16	Boston	2–4	Minnesota		Swayman	17,956	37–19–5	79
62	March 18	Boston	4–2	Winnipeg		Ullmark	14,191	38–19–5	81
63	March 21	Boston	3–2	Montreal	OT	Swayman	20,922	39–19–5	83
64	March 24	Tampa Bay	2–3	Boston		Swayman	17,850	40–19–5	85
65	March 26	NY Islanders	3–6	Boston		Ullmark	17,850	41–19–5	87
66	March 29	Toronto	6–4	Boston		Swayman	17,850	41–20–5	87
67	March 31	New Jersey	1–8	Boston		Ullmark	17,850	42–20–5	89

April: 9–6–0 (home: 5–1–0; road: 4–5–0)
#	Date	Visitor	Score	Home	OT	Decision	Attendance	Record	Pts	Recap
68	April 2	Columbus	2–5	Boston		Swayman	17,850	43–20–5	91
69	April 4	Boston	3–2	Columbus	OT	Ullmark	16,396	44–20–5	93
70	April 5	Boston	3–5	Detroit		Swayman	15,734	44–21–5	93
71	April 8	Boston	2–1	Tampa Bay	OT	Ullmark	19,092	45–21–5	95
72	April 10	Boston	2–4	Washington		Ullmark	18,573	45–22–5	95
73	April 12	St. Louis	4–2	Boston		Swayman	17,850	45–23–5	95
74	April 14	Ottawa	3–2	Boston		Swayman	17,850	45–24–5	95
75	April 16	Pittsburgh	1–2	Boston		Swayman	17,850	46–24–5	97
76	April 19	Boston	3–2	St. Louis	OT	Swayman	18,096	47–24–5	99
77	April 21	Boston	0–4	Pittsburgh		Swayman	18,350	47–25–5	99
78	April 23	NY Rangers	1–3	Boston		Ullmark	17,850	48–25–5	101
79	April 24	Boston	5–3	Montreal		Swayman	21,105	49–25–5	103
80	April 26	Florida	2–4	Boston		Ullmark	17,850	50–25–5	105
81	April 28	Buffalo	0–5	Boston		Ullmark	17,850	51–25–5	107
82	April 29	Boston	2–5	Toronto		Swayman	18,219	51–26–5	107

Legend: Win (2 points) Loss (0 points) Overtime/shootout loss (1 point)

=== Playoffs ===
2022 Stanley Cup playoffs

Eastern Conference First Round vs. (M1) Carolina Hurricanes: Carolina won 4–3
#	Date	Visitor	Score	Home	OT	Decision	Attendance	Series	Recap
1	May 2	Boston	1–5	Carolina		Ullmark	18,680	0–1
2	May 4	Boston	2–5	Carolina		Ullmark	18,880	0–2
3	May 6	Carolina	2–4	Boston		Swayman	17,850	1–2
4	May 8	Carolina	2–5	Boston		Swayman	17,850	2–2
5	May 10	Boston	1–5	Carolina		Swayman	19,163	2–3
6	May 12	Carolina	2–5	Boston		Swayman	17,850	3–3
7	May 14	Boston	2–3	Carolina		Swayman	19,513	3–4

Legend: Win Loss

== Player statistics ==
=== Skaters ===
Regular season
Player	GP	G	A	Pts	+/−	PIM
Brad Marchand	70	32	48	80	+16	97
David Pastrnak	72	40	37	77	+13	20
Patrice Bergeron	73	25	40	65	+26	32
Taylor Hall	81	20	41	61	+11	42
Charlie McAvoy	78	10	46	56	+31	66
Erik Haula	78	18	26	44	+19	47
Charlie Coyle	82	16	28	44	−6	32
Jake DeBrusk	77	25	17	42	+6	10
Craig Smith	74	16	20	36	+2	28
Matt Grzelcyk	73	4	20	24	+22	24
Trent Frederic	60	8	10	18	+10	57
Mike Reilly	70	4	13	17	−1	32
Tomas Nosek	75	3	14	17	−9	32
Curtis Lazar	70	8	8	16	−2	16
Brandon Carlo	79	6	9	15	+2	31
Derek Forbort	76	4	10	14	+2	48
Nick Foligno	64	2	11	13	−13	61
Connor Clifton	60	2	8	10	−2	32
Anton Blidh	32	2	7	9	−3	24
Oskar Steen	20	2	4	6	−1	6
Hampus Lindholm^{†}	10	0	5	5	+10	4
Urho Vaakanainen^{‡}	15	0	4	4	0	4
Marc McLaughlin	11	3	0	3	−1	8
Jakub Zboril	10	0	3	3	+1	4
Jack Studnicka	15	0	3	3	−5	4
Karson Kuhlman^{‡}	19	1	1	2	0	0
Jack Ahcan	6	1	0	1	−3	0
Jesper Froden	7	1	0	1	+4	2
John Moore^{‡}	7	0	1	1	+2	4
Chris Wagner	1	0	0	0	−1	0
Steven Fogarty	2	0	0	0	−2	2
Tyler Lewington	2	0	0	0	−1	7
Josh Brown^{†}	6	0	0	0	+2	5

Playoffs
Player	GP	G	A	Pts	+/−	PIM
Brad Marchand	7	4	7	11	+3	10
Patrice Bergeron	7	3	4	7	+3	4
David Pastrnak	7	3	3	6	+1	2
Charlie Coyle	7	2	4	6	−7	2
Charlie McAvoy	6	0	5	5	+2	4
Jake DeBrusk	7	2	2	4	−7	2
Taylor Hall	7	2	2	4	−6	8
Erik Haula	7	1	2	3	−4	8
Connor Clifton	7	1	1	2	+1	8
Tomas Nosek	7	0	2	2	+1	0
Curtis Lazar	7	1	0	1	+1	2
Derek Forbort	7	1	0	1	−1	12
Brandon Carlo	7	0	1	1	−5	6
Nick Foligno	7	0	1	1	+2	4
Trent Frederic	4	0	0	0	−2	16
Josh Brown	1	0	0	0	−2	0
Matt Grzelcyk	5	0	0	0	−6	6
Hampus Lindholm	4	0	0	0	+2	0
Mike Reilly	5	0	0	0	+1	2
Chris Wagner	3	0	0	0	0	0
Craig Smith	7	0	0	0	−5	2

=== Goaltenders ===
Regular season
Player	GP	GS	TOI	W	L	OT	GA	GAA	SA	SV%	SO	G	A	PIM
Linus Ullmark	41	39	2,330:26	26	10	2	95	2.45	1,140	.917	1	0	1	4
Jeremy Swayman	41	39	2,390:14	23	14	3	96	2.41	1,111	.914	3	0	0	6
Tuukka Rask	4	4	196:21	2	2	0	14	4.28	90	.844	0	0	0	2

Playoffs
Player	GP	GS	TOI	W	L	GA	GAA	SA	SV%	SO	G	A	PIM
Jeremy Swayman	5	5	296:07	3	2	13	2.63	146	.911	0	0	0	0
Linus Ullmark	2	2	115:15	0	2	8	4.16	57	.860	0	0	1	0

^{†}Denotes player spent time with another team before joining the Bruins. Stats reflect time with the Bruins only.
^{‡}Denotes player was traded mid-season. Stats reflect time with the Bruins only.

== Transactions ==
=== Trades ===
Date	Details		Ref
July 28, 2021	To Calgary Flames Dan Vladar	To Boston Bruins 3rd round pick in 2022	
February 22, 2022	To Arizona Coyotes 7th-round pick in 2024	To Boston Bruins Michael Callahan	
March 19, 2022	To Anaheim Ducks John Moore; Urho Vaakanainen; 1st-round pick in 2022; 2nd-round pick in 2023; 2nd-round pick in 2024	To Boston Bruins Hampus Lindholm; Kodie Curran	
March 21, 2022	To Ottawa Senators Zachary Senyshyn; 5th-round pick in 2022	To Boston Bruins Josh Brown; Conditional^{2} 7th-round pick in 2022	
March 28, 2022	To St. Louis Blues Brady Lyle	To Boston Bruins Future considerations	

Notes:

1. Boston will receive a 6th-round pick in 2022 if Senyshyn plays at least 5 games with Ottawa during the 2021-22 season; otherwise Boston will receive a 7th-round pick in 2022.

=== Players acquired ===
Date	Player	Former team	Term	Via	Ref
July 28, 2021	Samuel Asselin	Providence Bruins (AHL)	2-year	Free agency	
July 28, 2021	Troy Grosenick	Los Angeles Kings	1-year	Free agency	
July 28, 2021	Steven Fogarty	Buffalo Sabres	1-year	Free agency	
July 28, 2021	Nick Foligno	Toronto Maple Leafs	2-year	Free agency	
July 28, 2021	Derek Forbort	Winnipeg Jets	3-year	Free agency	
July 28, 2021	Erik Haula	Nashville Predators	2-year	Free agency	
July 28, 2021	Tyler Lewington	Nashville Predators	1-year	Free agency	
July 28, 2021	Tomas Nosek	Vegas Golden Knights	2-year	Free agency	
July 28, 2021	Linus Ullmark	Buffalo Sabres	4-year	Free agency	
March 15, 2022	Marc McLaughlin	Boston College Eagles (HE)	2-year	Free agency	
March 15, 2022	Brandon Bussi	Western Michigan Broncos (NCHC)	1-year	Free agency	
April 9, 2022	Georgi Merkulov	Ohio State Buckeyes (B1G)	3-year	Free agency	
June 7, 2022	Kai Wissmann	Eisbaren Berlin (DEL)	1-year	Free agency	

=== Players lost ===
Date	Player	New team	Term	Via	Ref
July 14, 2021	Kevan Miller			Retirement	
July 21, 2021	Jeremy Lauzon	Seattle Kraken		Expansion draft	
July 23, 2021	Robert Lantosi	Rogle BK (SHL)	1-year	Free agency	
July 28, 2021	Jaroslav Halak	Vancouver Canucks	1-year	Free agency	
July 28, 2021	Sean Kuraly	Columbus Blue Jackets	4-year	Free agency	
July 28, 2021	Greg McKegg	New York Rangers	1-year	Free agency	
August 2, 2021	David Krejci	HC Olomouc (ELH)	1-year	Free agency	
January 17, 2022	Karson Kuhlman	Seattle Kraken		Waivers	
February 9, 2022	Tuukka Rask			Retirement	
June 7, 2022	Tyler Lewington	EHC Red Bull München (DEL)	Unknown	Free agency	

=== Signings ===
Date	Player	Term	Contract type	Ref
July 14, 2021	Brandon Carlo	6-year	Re-signing	
July 23, 2021	Taylor Hall	4-year	Re-signing	
July 26, 2021	Nick Wolff	1-year	Re-signing	
July 28, 2021	Mike Reilly	3-year	Re-signing	
August 5, 2021	Callum Booth	1-year	Re-signing	
August 9, 2021	Fabian Lysell	3-year	Entry-level	
September 20, 2021	Zachary Senyshyn	1-year	Re-signing	
October 15, 2021	Charlie McAvoy	8-year	Extension	
January 11, 2022	Tuukka Rask	1-year	Re-signing	
March 22, 2022	Jake DeBrusk	2-year	Extension	
April 10, 2022	Oskar Steen	2-year	Extension	
May 16, 2022	John Beecher	3-year	Entry-level	
May 16, 2022	Jakub Zboril	2-year	Extension	
June 2, 2022	Joona Koppanen	1-year	Extension	
July 5, 2022	Kyle Keyser	1-year	Extension	
July 5, 2022	Nick Wolff	1-year	Extension	

== Draft picks ==
Below are the Boston Bruins' selections at the 2021 NHL entry draft, which was held on July 23 and 24, 2021. It was held virtually via Video conference call from the NHL Network studio in Secaucus, New Jersey.

Round	#	Player	Pos	Nationality	College/Junior/Club (League)
1	21	Fabian Lysell	RW	Sweden	Lulea HF (SHL)
3	85	Brett Harrison	C	Canada	Koovee (Mestis)
4	117	Philip Svedeback	G	Sweden	Vaxjo Lakers U20 (J20 SuperElit)
5	149	Oskar Jellvik	C	Sweden	Djurgardens IF (SHL)
6	181	Ryan Mast	D	United States	Sarnia Sting (OHL)
7	213	Andre Gasseau	C	United States	U.S. NTDP (USHL)
7	217^{1}	Ty Gallagher	LW	United States	U.S. NTDP (USHL)

Notes:

1. The Toronto Maple Leafs' seventh-round pick went to the Boston Bruins as the result of a trade on October 7, 2020, that sent a seventh-round pick in 2020 (213th overall) to Toronto in exchange for this pick.
