= 2021–22 Columbus Blue Jackets season =

National Hockey League season

2021–22 Columbus Blue Jackets
- Division: 6th Metropolitan
- Conference: 10th Eastern
- 2021–22 record: 37–38–7
- Home record: 21–15–5
- Road record: 16–23–2
- Goals for: 262
- Goals against: 300

Team information
- General manager: Jarmo Kekäläinen
- Coach: Brad Larsen
- Captain: Boone Jenner
- Alternate captains: Oliver Bjorkstrand; Gustav Nyquist; Zach Werenski
- Arena: Nationwide Arena
- Average attendance: 16,237
- Minor league affiliates: Cleveland Monsters (AHL); Kalamazoo Wings (ECHL)

Team leaders
- Goals: Oliver Bjorkstrand (28)
- Assists: Jakub Voracek (56)
- Points: Jakub Voracek (62)
- Penalty minutes: Vladislav Gavrikov (68)
- Plus/minus: Gabriel Carlsson; Gregory Hofmann (+6)
- Wins: Elvis Merzlikins (27)
- Goals against average: Daniil Tarasov (2.40)

The 2021–22 Columbus Blue Jackets season was the 22nd season for the National Hockey League (NHL) franchise that was established on June 25, 1997. On April 16, 2022, the Blue Jackets were eliminated from playoff contention for the second consecutive season for the first time since the 2014–15 season and the 2015–16 season when the Washington Capitals defeated the Montreal Canadiens.

== Standings ==
=== Divisional standings ===
Metropolitan Division
| Pos | Team | GP | W | L | OTL | RW | GF | GA | GD | Pts |
|---|---|---|---|---|---|---|---|---|---|---|
| 1 | y – Carolina Hurricanes | 82 | 54 | 20 | 8 | 47 | 278 | 202 | +76 | 116 |
| 2 | x – New York Rangers | 82 | 52 | 24 | 6 | 44 | 254 | 207 | +47 | 110 |
| 3 | x – Pittsburgh Penguins | 82 | 46 | 25 | 11 | 37 | 272 | 229 | +43 | 103 |
| 4 | x – Washington Capitals | 82 | 44 | 26 | 12 | 35 | 275 | 245 | +30 | 100 |
| 5 | New York Islanders | 82 | 37 | 35 | 10 | 34 | 231 | 237 | −6 | 84 |
| 6 | Columbus Blue Jackets | 82 | 37 | 38 | 7 | 26 | 262 | 300 | −38 | 81 |
| 7 | New Jersey Devils | 82 | 27 | 46 | 9 | 19 | 248 | 307 | −59 | 63 |
| 8 | Philadelphia Flyers | 82 | 25 | 46 | 11 | 20 | 211 | 298 | −87 | 61 |

Source: National Hockey League
Rules for classification: 1) Fewer number of games played (GP, only during regular season); 2) Greater number of regulation wins (RW); 3) Greater number of wins in regulation and overtime, excluding shootout wins (ROW); 4) Greater number of total wins, including shootouts (W); 5) Greater number of points earned in head-to-head play; if teams played an uneven number of head-to-head games, the result of the first game on the home ice of the team with the extra home game is discarded; 6) Greater goal differential (GD); 7) Greater number of goals scored (GF)
x – Clinched playoff spot; y – Clinched division

=== Conference standings ===
Eastern Conference Wild Card
| Pos | Div | Team | GP | W | L | OTL | RW | GF | GA | GD | Pts |
|---|---|---|---|---|---|---|---|---|---|---|---|
| 1 | AT | x – Boston Bruins | 82 | 51 | 26 | 5 | 40 | 255 | 220 | +35 | 107 |
| 2 | ME | x – Washington Capitals | 82 | 44 | 26 | 12 | 35 | 275 | 245 | +30 | 100 |
| 3 | ME | New York Islanders | 82 | 37 | 35 | 10 | 34 | 231 | 237 | −6 | 84 |
| 4 | ME | Columbus Blue Jackets | 82 | 37 | 38 | 7 | 26 | 262 | 300 | −38 | 81 |
| 5 | AT | Buffalo Sabres | 82 | 32 | 39 | 11 | 25 | 232 | 290 | −58 | 75 |
| 6 | AT | Detroit Red Wings | 82 | 32 | 40 | 10 | 21 | 230 | 312 | −82 | 74 |
| 7 | AT | Ottawa Senators | 82 | 33 | 42 | 7 | 26 | 227 | 266 | −39 | 73 |
| 8 | ME | New Jersey Devils | 82 | 27 | 46 | 9 | 19 | 248 | 307 | −59 | 63 |
| 9 | ME | Philadelphia Flyers | 82 | 25 | 46 | 11 | 20 | 211 | 298 | −87 | 61 |
| 10 | AT | Montreal Canadiens | 82 | 22 | 49 | 11 | 16 | 221 | 319 | −98 | 55 |

Source: National Hockey League
Rules for classification: 1) Fewer number of games played (GP, only during regular season); 2) Greater number of regulation wins (RW); 3) Greater number of wins in regulation and overtime, excluding shootout wins (ROW); 4) Greater number of total wins, including shootouts (W); 5) Greater number of points earned in head-to-head play; if teams played an uneven number of head-to-head games, the result of the first game on the home ice of the team with the extra home game is discarded; 6) Greater goal differential (GD); 7) Greater number of goals scored (GF)
x – Clinched playoff spot

== Schedule and results ==
=== Preseason ===
2021 preseason game log: 4–2–2 (home: 2–0–2; road: 2–2–0)
| # | Date | Visitor | Score | Home | OT | Decision | Attendance | Record | Recap |
|---|---|---|---|---|---|---|---|---|---|
| 1 | September 27 | Columbus | 3–0 | Pittsburgh | | Berube | 12,979 | 1–0–0 |
| 2 | September 28 | Buffalo | 5–4 | Columbus | SO | Greaves | 9,623 | 1–0–1 |
| 3 | September 29 | St. Louis | 2–5 | Columbus | | Tarasov | 9,220 | 2–0–1 |
| 4 | October 2 | Columbus | 1–5 | Detroit | | Merzlikins | 14,827 | 2–1–1 |
| 5 | October 4 | Columbus | 5–3 | Buffalo | | Korpisalo | 6,327 | 3–1–1 |
| 6 | October 6 | Detroit | 2–4 | Columbus | | Merzlikins | 10,374 | 4–1–1 |
| 7 | October 8 | Columbus | 3–7 | St. Louis | | Korpisalo | 14,790 | 4–2–1 |
| 8 | October 9 | Pittsburgh | 4–3 | Columbus | OT | Merzlikins | 14,771 | 4–2–2 |

=== Regular season ===
2021–22 game log

October: 5–3–0 (home: 4–1–0; road: 1–2–0)
| # | Date | Visitor | Score | Home | OT | Decision | Attendance | Record | Pts | Recap |
|---|---|---|---|---|---|---|---|---|---|---|
| 1 | October 14 | Arizona | 2–8 | Columbus | | Merzlikins | 17,813 | 1–0–0 | 2 |
| 2 | October 16 | Seattle | 1–2 | Columbus | OT | Merzlikins | 17,593 | 2–0–0 | 4 |
| 3 | October 19 | Columbus | 1–4 | Detroit | | Korpisalo | 14,165 | 2–1–0 | 4 |
| 4 | October 21 | NY Islanders | 2–3 | Columbus | OT | Merzlikins | 12,937 | 3–1–0 | 6 |
| 5 | October 23 | Carolina | 5–1 | Columbus | | Korpisalo | 14,386 | 3–2–0 | 6 |
| 6 | October 25 | Dallas | 1–4 | Columbus | | Merzlikins | 12,629 | 4–2–0 | 8 |
| 7 | October 29 | Columbus | 0–4 | NY Rangers | | Merzlikins | 14,532 | 4–3–0 | 8 |
| 8 | October 31 | Columbus | 4–3 | New Jersey | SO | Korpisalo | 10,239 | 5–3–0 | 10 |

November: 7–5–0 (home: 4–2–0; road: 3–3–0)
| # | Date | Visitor | Score | Home | OT | Decision | Attendance | Record | Pts | Recap |
|---|---|---|---|---|---|---|---|---|---|---|
| 9 | November 3 | Columbus | 5–4 | Colorado | OT | Korpisalo | 16,634 | 6–3–0 | 12 |
| 10 | November 6 | Colorado | 2–4 | Columbus | | Merzlikins | 16,494 | 7–3–0 | 14 |
| 11 | November 12 | Washington | 4–3 | Columbus | | Korpisalo | 16,985 | 7–4–0 | 14 |
| 12 | November 13 | NY Rangers | 5–3 | Columbus | | Merzlikins | 15,539 | 7–5–0 | 14 |
| 13 | November 15 | Detroit | 3–5 | Columbus | | Merzlikins | 15,293 | 8–5–0 | 16 |
| 14 | November 18 | Columbus | 5–4 | Arizona | SO | Merzlikins | 7,865 | 9–5–0 | 18 |
| 15 | November 20 | Columbus | 2–3 | Vegas | | Merzlikins | 18,313 | 9–6–0 | 18 |
| 16 | November 22 | Columbus | 7–4 | Buffalo | | Korpisalo | 7,978 | 10–6–0 | 20 |
| 17 | November 24 | Winnipeg | 0–3 | Columbus | | Merzlikins | 15,733 | 11–6–0 | 22 |
| 18 | November 26 | Vancouver | 2–4 | Columbus | | Merzlikins | 16,992 | 12–6–0 | 24 |
| 19 | November 27 | Columbus | 3–6 | St. Louis | | Korpisalo | 18,096 | 12–7–0 | 24 |
| 20 | November 30 | Columbus | 0–6 | Nashville | | Merzlikins | 16,874 | 12–8–0 | 24 |

December: 3–5–1 (home: 2–0–1; road: 1–5–0)
| # | Date | Visitor | Score | Home | OT | Decision | Attendance | Record | Pts | Recap |
|---|---|---|---|---|---|---|---|---|---|---|
| 21 | December 2 | Columbus | 2–3 | Dallas | | Tarasov | 17,098 | 12–9–0 | 24 |
| 22 | December 4 | Columbus | 1–3 | Washington | | Tarasov | 18,573 | 12–10–0 | 24 |
| 23 | December 5 | San Jose | 4–6 | Columbus | | Merzlikins | 16,824 | 13–10–0 | 26 |
| 24 | December 7 | Columbus | 4–5 | Toronto | | Merzlikins | 18,793 | 13–11–0 | 26 |
| 25 | December 9 | Anaheim | 2–1 | Columbus | SO | Merzlikins | 16,029 | 13–11–1 | 27 |
| 26 | December 11 | Columbus | 5–4 | Seattle | OT | Merzlikins | 17,151 | 14–11–1 | 29 |
| 27 | December 14 | Columbus | 3–4 | Vancouver | | Merzlikins | 18,412 | 14–12–1 | 29 |
| 28 | December 16 | Columbus | 2–5 | Edmonton | | Merzlikins | 15,022 | 14–13–1 | 29 |
| — | December 18 | Columbus | | Calgary | Postponed due to COVID-19. Moved to February 15. |
| — | December 20 | Columbus | | Buffalo | Postponed due to COVID-19. Moved to February 10. |
| — | December 23 | Buffalo | | Columbus | Postponed due to COVID-19. Moved to February 20. |
| — | December 27 | Toronto | | Columbus | Postponed due to COVID-19. Moved to February 22. |
| — | December 28 | Columbus | | Chicago | Postponed due to COVID-19. Moved to February 17. |
| 29 | December 30 | Nashville | 3–4 | Columbus | SO | Merzlikins | 17,494 | 15–13–1 | 31 |

January: 5–9–0 (home: 2–7–0; road: 3–2–0)
| # | Date | Visitor | Score | Home | OT | Decision | Attendance | Record | Pts | Recap |
|---|---|---|---|---|---|---|---|---|---|---|
| 30 | January 1 | Carolina | 7–4 | Columbus | | Tarasov | 15,736 | 15–14–1 | 31 |
| 31 | January 4 | Tampa Bay | 7–2 | Columbus | | Korpisalo | 14,816 | 15–15–1 | 31 |
| 32 | January 6 | Columbus | 1–3 | New Jersey | | Korpisalo | 11,523 | 15–16–1 | 31 |
| 33 | January 8 | New Jersey | 3–4 | Columbus | | Korpisalo | 18,680 | 16–16–1 | 33 |
| — | January 10 | Columbus | | Montreal | Postponed due to attendance restrictions. Moved to February 12. |
| 34 | January 11 | Chicago | 4–2 | Columbus | | Korpisalo | 15,444 | 16–17–1 | 33 |
| 35 | January 13 | Columbus | 6–0 | Carolina | | Merzlikins | 15,979 | 17–17–1 | 35 |
| 36 | January 15 | Columbus | 2–9 | Florida | | Merzlikins | 15,088 | 17–18–1 | 35 |
| — | January 18 | Columbus | | NY Islanders | Postponed due to scheduling changes. Moved to March 10. |
| 37 | January 20 | Columbus | 2–1 | Philadelphia | | Merzlikins | 15,359 | 18–18–1 | 37 |
| 38 | January 21 | Pittsburgh | 5–2 | Columbus | | Korpisalo | 18,477 | 18–19–1 | 37 |
| 39 | January 23 | Ottawa | 2–1 | Columbus | | Merzlikins | 15,037 | 18–20–1 | 37 |
| 40 | January 26 | Calgary | 6–0 | Columbus | | Merzlikins | 13,737 | 18–21–1 | 37 |
| 41 | January 27 | NY Rangers | 3–5 | Columbus | | Korpisalo | 14,878 | 19–21–1 | 39 |
| 42 | January 30 | Columbus | 6–3 | Montreal | | Korpisalo | 0 | 20–21–1 | 41 |
| 43 | January 31 | Florida | 8–4 | Columbus | | Merzlikins | 14,214 | 20–22–1 | 41 |

February: 7–3–0 (home: 2–1–0; road: 5–2–0)
| # | Date | Visitor | Score | Home | OT | Decision | Attendance | Record | Pts | Recap |
|---|---|---|---|---|---|---|---|---|---|---|
| 44 | February 8 | Columbus | 5–4 | Washington | | Merzlikins | 18,573 | 21–22–1 | 43 |
| 45 | February 10 | Columbus | 4–3 | Buffalo | OT | Merzlikins | 8,476 | 22–22–1 | 45 |
| 46 | February 12 | Columbus | 2–1 | Montreal | | Merzlikins | 500 | 23–22–1 | 47 |
| 47 | February 15 | Columbus | 2–6 | Calgary | | Merzlikins | 9,639 | 23–23–1 | 47 |
| 48 | February 17 | Columbus | 7–4 | Chicago | | Merzlikins | 19,290 | 24–23–1 | 49 |
| 49 | February 20 | Buffalo | 3–7 | Columbus | | Berube | 18,608 | 25–23–1 | 51 |
| 50 | February 22 | Toronto | 3–4 | Columbus | OT | Berube | 15,489 | 26–23–1 | 53 |
| 51 | February 24 | Columbus | 6–3 | Florida | | Berube | 15,730 | 27–23–1 | 55 |
| 52 | February 25 | Columbus | 0–4 | Carolina | | Berube | 17,112 | 27–24–1 | 55 |
| 53 | February 27 | Pittsburgh | 3–2 | Columbus | | Merzlikins | 17,072 | 27–25–1 | 55 |

March: 5–6–4 (home: 4–3–2; road: 1–3–2)
| # | Date | Visitor | Score | Home | OT | Decision | Attendance | Record | Pts | Recap |
|---|---|---|---|---|---|---|---|---|---|---|
| 54 | March 1 | New Jersey | 3–4 | Columbus | | Merzlikins | 13,678 | 28–25–1 | 57 |
| 55 | March 4 | Los Angeles | 4–3 | Columbus | OT | Merzlikins | 15,778 | 28–25–2 | 58 |
| 56 | March 5 | Boston | 5–4 | Columbus | SO | Merzlikins | 19,434 | 28–25–3 | 59 |
| 57 | March 7 | Toronto | 5–4 | Columbus | | Merzlikins | 14,252 | 28–26–3 | 59 |
| 58 | March 10 | Columbus | 0–6 | NY Islanders | | Korpisalo | 16,048 | 28–27–3 | 59 |
| 59 | March 11 | Minnesota | 2–3 | Columbus | SO | Merzlikins | 16,399 | 29–27–3 | 61 |
| 60 | March 13 | Vegas | 4–6 | Columbus | | Merzlikins | 16,087 | 30–27–3 | 63 |
| 61 | March 16 | Columbus | 4–1 | Ottawa | | Merzlikins | 10,087 | 31–27–3 | 65 |
| 62 | March 17 | Washington | 7–2 | Columbus | | Korpisalo | 15,911 | 31–28–3 | 65 |
| 63 | March 19 | St. Louis | 4–5 | Columbus | | Korpisalo | 19,005 | 32–28–3 | 67 |
| 64 | March 22 | Columbus | 1–5 | Pittsburgh | | Korpisalo | 18,196 | 32–29–3 | 67 |
| 65 | March 25 | Columbus | 3–4 | Winnipeg | OT | Merzlikins | 13,475 | 32–29–4 | 68 |
| 66 | March 26 | Columbus | 2–3 | Minnesota | OT | Merzlikins | 19,089 | 32–29–5 | 69 |
| 67 | March 29 | NY Islanders | 4–3 | Columbus | | Merzlikins | 15,557 | 32–30–5 | 69 |
| 68 | March 31 | Columbus | 2–5 | NY Islanders | | Merzlikins | 17,255 | 32–31–5 | 69 |

April: 5–7–2 (home: 3–1–2; road: 2–6–0)
| # | Date | Visitor | Score | Home | OT | Decision | Attendance | Record | Pts | Recap |
|---|---|---|---|---|---|---|---|---|---|---|
| 69 | April 2 | Columbus | 2–5 | Boston | | Merzlikins | 17,850 | 32–32–5 | 69 |
| 70 | April 4 | Boston | 3–2 | Columbus | OT | Merzlikins | 16,396 | 32–32–6 | 70 |
| 71 | April 5 | Columbus | 4–2 | Philadelphia | | Merzlikins | 14,367 | 33–32–6 | 72 |
| 72 | April 7 | Philadelphia | 4–1 | Columbus | | Merzlikins | 17,118 | 33–33–6 | 72 |
| 73 | April 9 | Columbus | 5–4 | Detroit | OT | Merzlikins | 19,515 | 34–33–6 | 74 |
| 74 | April 13 | Montreal | 1–5 | Columbus | | Merzlikins | 16,708 | 35–33–6 | 76 |
| 75 | April 16 | Columbus | 1–2 | Los Angeles | | Merzlikins | 18,230 | 35–34–6 | 76 |
| 76 | April 17 | Columbus | 4–6 | Anaheim | | Berube | 13,635 | 35–35–6 | 76 |
| 77 | April 19 | Columbus | 2–3 | San Jose | | Merzlikins | 11,894 | 35–36–6 | 76 |
| 78 | April 22 | Ottawa | 2–1 | Columbus | SO | Merzlikins | 18,116 | 35–36–7 | 77 |
| 79 | April 24 | Edmonton | 2–5 | Columbus | | Merzlikins | 18,120 | 36–36–7 | 79 |
| 80 | April 26 | Columbus | 1–4 | Tampa Bay | | Merzlikins | 19,092 | 36–37–7 | 79 |
| 81 | April 28 | Tampa Bay | 2–5 | Columbus | | Merzlikins | 18,234 | 37–37–7 | 81 |
| 82 | April 29 | Columbus | 3–5 | Pittsburgh | | Merzlikins | 18,402 | 37–38–7 | 81 |

Legend: Win (2 points) Loss (0 points) Overtime/shootout loss (1 point)

== Player statistics ==
As of March 22, 2022

=== Skaters ===
Regular season
| Player | GP | G | A | Pts | +/− | PIM |
|---|---|---|---|---|---|---|
| Patrik Laine | 56 | 26 | 30 | 56 | -7 | 24 |
| Oliver Bjorkstrand | 80 | 28 | 29 | 57 | −35 | 16 |
| Jakub Voracek | 79 | 6 | 56 | 62 | −13 | 44 |
| Boone Jenner | 59 | 23 | 21 | 44 | −11 | 22 |
| Zach Werenski | 68 | 11 | 37 | 48 | −15 | 22 |
| Gustav Nyquist | 82 | 18 | 35 | 53 | −12 | 26 |
| Max Domi^{‡} | 53 | 9 | 23 | 32 | +2 | 37 |
| Jack Roslovic | 81 | 22 | 23 | 45 | +2 | 12 |
| Vladislav Gavrikov | 80 | 5 | 28 | 33 | –3 | 68 |
| Sean Kuraly | 77 | 14 | 16 | 30 | +2 | 61 |
| Cole Sillinger | 79 | 16 | 15 | 31 | −22 | 37 |
| Eric Robinson | 67 | 10 | 17 | 27 | -1 | 18 |
| Alexandre Texier | 36 | 11 | 9 | 20 | 0 | 12 |
| Adam Boqvist | 52 | 11 | 11 | 22 | −11 | 12 |
| Jake Bean | 67 | 7 | 18 | 25 | -5 | 26 |
| Andrew Peeke | 82 | 2 | 13 | 15 | –14 | 60 |
| Egor Chinakhov | 62 | 7 | 7 | 14 | −27 | 16 |
| Dean Kukan | 41 | 3 | 8 | 11 | -2 | 16 |
| Gavin Bayreuther | 43 | 0 | 8 | 8 | 0 | 22 |
| Justin Danforth | 45 | 10 | 4 | 14 | -5 | 10 |
| Gregory Hofmann^{‡} | 24 | 2 | 5 | 7 | +6 | 8 |
| Gabriel Carlsson | 38 | 2 | 7 | 9 | +6 | 10 |
| Emil Bemstrom | 41 | 6 | 5 | 11 | -1 | 4 |
| Brendan Gaunce | 30 | 5 | 2 | 7 | +2 | 12 |
| Trey Fix-Wolansky | 6 | 1 | 1 | 2 | –1 | 0 |
| Jake Christiansen | 8 | 1 | 0 | 1 | +1 | 0 |
| Scott Harrington | 7 | 0 | 1 | 1 | −4 | 6 |
| Kevin Stenlund | 3 | 0 | 0 | 0 | 0 | 2 |
| Liam Foudy | 1 | 0 | 0 | 0 | –1 | 0 |
| Nick Blankenburg | 7 | 1 | 2 | 3 | -3 | 4 |
| Kent Johnson | 9 | 0 | 3 | 3 | +2 | 2 |
| Carson Meyer | 13 | 1 | 2 | 3 | 0 | 6 |

=== Goaltenders ===
Regular season
| Player | GP | GS | TOI | W | L | OT | GA | GAA | SA | SV% | SO | G | A | PIM |
|---|---|---|---|---|---|---|---|---|---|---|---|---|---|---|
| Elvis Merzlikins | 59 | 56 | 3320:07 | 27 | 23 | 7 | 178 | 3.22 | 1,742 | .907 | 2 | 0 | 2 | 8 |
| Joonas Korpisalo | 22 | 17 | 1128:29 | 7 | 11 | 0 | 78 | 4.15 | 634 | .877 | 0 | 0 | 0 | 2 |
| Jean-Francois Berube | 6 | 6 | 305:53 | 3 | 2 | 0 | 21 | 4.12 | 209 | .900 | 0 | 0 | 1 | 0 |
| Daniil Tarasov | 4 | 3 | 174:51 | 0 | 2 | 0 | 7 | 2.40 | 111 | .937 | 0 | 0 | 0 | 0 |

^{†}Denotes player spent time with another team before joining the Blue Jackets. Stats reflect time with the Blue Jackets only.
^{‡}Denotes player was traded mid-season. Stats reflect time with the Blue Jackets only.
Bold/italics denotes franchise record.

== Transactions ==
The Blue Jackets have been involved in the following transactions during the 2021–22 season.

Key:

† Contract is entry-level.

‡ Contract initially takes effect in the 2022-23 NHL season.

=== Trades ===
| Date | Details | | Ref |
|---|---|---|---|
| July 23, 2021 | To Chicago Blackhawks Seth Jones; TBL 1st-round pick in 2021; 6th-round pick in 2022 | To Columbus Blue Jackets Adam Boqvist; 1st-round pick in 2021; 2nd-round pick in 2021 conditional 1st-round pick in 2022 or 2023^{1} | |
| July 23, 2021 | To Carolina Hurricanes CHI 2nd-round pick in 2021 | To Columbus Blue Jackets Jake Bean | |
| July 24, 2021 | To Philadelphia Flyers Cam Atkinson | To Columbus Blue Jackets Jakub Voracek | |
| March 21, 2022 | To Carolina Hurricanes Max Domi; Tyler Inamoto | To Columbus Blue Jackets Aidan Hreschuk | |
| March 21, 2022 | To Florida Panthers Yegor Korshkov; TOR 6th-round pick in 2022 | To Columbus Blue Jackets Aidan Hreschuk | |
| June 30, 2022 | To Nashville Predators TOR 4th-round pick in 2022 | To Columbus Blue Jackets Mathieu Olivier | |

Notes:

1. Columbus would receive Chicago's 1st-round pick in 2022 if the pick was outside the top 2, otherwise Columbus would receive Chicago's 1st-round pick in 2023. As Chicago's pick was outside the top 2 selections, Columbus received Chicago's 2022 1st-round pick.

=== Players acquired ===
| Date | Player | Former team | Term | Via | Ref |
|---|---|---|---|---|---|
| July 28, 2021 | Gavin Bayreuther | Seattle Kraken | 2-year | Free agency | |
| July 28, 2021 | Sean Kuraly | Boston Bruins | 4-year | Free agency | |
| July 28, 2021 | Tyler Sikura | Cleveland Monsters (AHL) | 1-year | Free agency | |
| July 30, 2021 | Brendan Gaunce | Växjö Lakers (SHL) | 1-year | Free agency | |
| August 13, 2021 | Zac Rinaldo | Calgary Flames | 1-year | Free agency | |
| September 30, 2021 | Jean-Francois Berube | Ontario Reign (AHL) | 1-year | Free agency | |
| February 20, 2022 | Jet Greaves | Cleveland Monsters (AHL) | 3-year† | Free agency | |
| March 7, 2022 | Billy Sweezey | Cleveland Monsters (AHL) | 2-year† | Free agency | |
| April 8, 2022 | Nick Blankenburg | Michigan Wolverines (B1G) | 1-year† | Free agency | |
| May 24, 2022 | Marcus Bjork | Brynäs IF (SHL) | 2-year†‡ | Free agency | |
| June 1, 2022 | Joona Luoto | Tappara (Liiga) | 1-year†‡ | Free agency | |

=== Players lost ===
| Date | Player | New team | Term | Via | Ref |
|---|---|---|---|---|---|
| July 21, 2021 | Gavin Bayreuther | Seattle Kraken | | Expansion draft | |
| July 28, 2021 | Adam Clendening | Philadelphia Flyers | 1-year | Free agency | |
| July 28, 2021 | Michael Del Zotto | Ottawa Senators | 2-year | Free agency | |
| July 29, 2021 | Kole Sherwood | Ottawa Senators | 1-year | Free agency | |
| July 30, 2021 | Zac Dalpe | Florida Panthers | 2-year | Free agency | |
| October 7, 2021 | Cliff Pu | Kunlun Red Star (KHL) | 1-year | Free agency | |
| October 12, 2021 | Mikko Lehtonen | | | Contract termination | |
| October 17, 2021 | Mikko Lehtonen | SKA Saint Petersburg (KHL) | 4-year | Free agency | |
| January 11, 2022 | Gregory Hofmann | EV Zug (NL) | 2-year | Free agency | |
| January 13, 2022 | Gregory Hofmann | | | Contract termination | |
| June 1, 2022 | Dean Kukan | ZSC Lions (NL) | 5-year‡ | Free agency | |

=== Signings ===
| Date | Player | Term | Ref |
|---|---|---|---|
| July 28, 2021 | Boone Jenner | 4-year‡ | |
| July 28, 2021 | Patrik Laine | 1-year | |
| July 28, 2021 | Eric Robinson | 2-year‡ | |
| July 28, 2021 | Alexandre Texier | 2-year | |
| July 29, 2021 | Jake Bean | 3-year | |
| July 29, 2021 | Zach Werenski | 6-year‡ | |
| July 30, 2021 | Mikko Lehtonen | 1-year | |
| August 13, 2021 | Stanislav Svozil | 3-year† | |
| August 16, 2021 | Ole Julian Bjorgvik-Holm | 3-year† | |
| August 18, 2021 | Cole Sillinger | 3-year† | |
| September 21, 2021 | Elvis Merzlikins | 5-year‡ | |
| March 8, 2022 | Justin Danforth | 2-year‡ | |
| April 8, 2022 | Kent Johnson | 3-year† | |
| May 2, 2022 | Kirill Marchenko | 2-year†‡ | |
| May 5, 2022 | Mikael Pyyhtia | 3-year†‡ | |
| May 20, 2022 | Joonas Korpisalo | 1-year‡ | |
| June 7, 2022 | Jack Roslovic | 2-year‡ | |
| June 15, 2022 | Daniil Tarasov | 3-year‡ | |
| June 17, 2022 | Liam Foudy | 2-year‡ | |
| June 18, 2022 | Brendan Gaunce | 2-year‡ | |
| July 1, 2022 | Josh Dunne | 1-year‡ | |
| July 2, 2022 | Carson Meyer | 1-year‡ | |
| July 6, 2022 | Adam Boqvist | 3-year‡ | |

== Draft picks ==
Below are the Columbus Blue Jackets' selections at the 2021 NHL entry draft, which were held on July 23 to 24, 2021. It was held virtually via Video conference call from the NHL Network studio in Secaucus, New Jersey.

| Round | # | Player | Pos. | Nationality | Team (League) |
|---|---|---|---|---|---|
| 1 | 5 | Kent Johnson | C | Canada | Michigan Wolverines (Big Ten) |
| 1 | 12 | Cole Sillinger | C | Canada | Sioux Falls Stampede (USHL) |
| 1 | 25 | Corson Ceulemans | D | Canada | Brooks Bandits (AJHL) |
| 3 | 69 | Stanislav Svozil | D | Czech Republic | HC Kometa Brno (ELH) |
| 4 | 101 | Guillaume Richard | D | Canada | Tri-City Storm (USHL) |
| 5 | 132 | Nikolai Makarov | D | Russia | Krasnaya Armiya (MHL) |
| 5 | 133 | James Malatesta | C | Canada | Quebec Remparts (QMJHL) |
| 6 | 165 | Ben Boyd | C | Canada | Charlottetown Islanders (QMJHL) |
| 7 | 197 | Martin Rysavy | LW | Czech Republic | HC Vítkovice Ridera (ELH) |
