= 2021–22 St. Louis Blues season =

National Hockey League season

2021–22 St. Louis Blues
- Division: 3rd Central
- Conference: 4th Western
- 2021–22 record: 49–22–11
- Home record: 26–10–5
- Road record: 23–12–6
- Goals for: 311
- Goals against: 242

Team information
- General manager: Doug Armstrong
- Coach: Craig Berube
- Captain: Ryan O'Reilly
- Alternate captains: Colton Parayko; Brayden Schenn; Vladimir Tarasenko
- Arena: Enterprise Center
- Average attendance: 17,716
- Minor league affiliate: Springfield Thunderbirds (AHL)

Team leaders
- Goals: Vladimir Tarasenko (34)
- Assists: Robert Thomas (57)
- Points: Vladimir Tarasenko (82)
- Penalty minutes: Niko Mikkola (55)
- Plus/minus: Justin Faulk (+41)
- Wins: Ville Husso (25)
- Goals against average: Charlie Lindgren (1.22)

The 2021–22 St. Louis Blues season was the 55th season for the National Hockey League (NHL) franchise that was established in 1967. On April 16, 2022, the Blues clinched a playoff spot after a 6–5 overtime win against the Minnesota Wild.

The Blues set a franchise record with a 16-game point scoring streak from April 1–24. The Blues upset the Minnesota Wild in six games in the First Round, but lost to the Stanley Cup-winning Colorado Avalanche in six games in the Second Round.

== Standings ==
=== Divisional standings ===
Central Division
Pos	Team	GP	W	L	OTL	RW	GF	GA	GD	Pts
1	z – Colorado Avalanche	82	56	19	7	46	312	234	+78	119
2	x – Minnesota Wild	82	53	22	7	37	310	253	+57	113
3	x – St. Louis Blues	82	49	22	11	43	311	242	+69	109
4	x – Dallas Stars	82	46	30	6	31	238	246	−8	98
5	x – Nashville Predators	82	45	30	7	35	266	252	+14	97
6	Winnipeg Jets	82	39	32	11	31	252	257	−5	89
7	Chicago Blackhawks	82	28	42	12	16	219	291	−72	68
8	Arizona Coyotes	82	25	50	7	18	207	313	−106	57

Source: National Hockey League
Rules for classification: 1) Fewer number of games played (GP, only during regular season); 2) Greater number of regulation wins (RW); 3) Greater number of wins in regulation and overtime, excluding shootout wins (ROW); 4) Greater number of total wins, including shootouts (W); 5) Greater number of points earned in head-to-head play; if teams played an uneven number of head-to-head games, the result of the first game on the home ice of the team with the extra home game is discarded; 6) Greater goal differential (GD); 7) Greater number of goals scored (GF)
x – Clinched playoff spot; z – Clinched conference

=== Conference standings ===
Western Conference Wild Card
Pos	Div	Team	GP	W	L	OTL	RW	GF	GA	GD	Pts
1	CE	x – Dallas Stars	82	46	30	6	31	238	246	−8	98
2	CE	x – Nashville Predators	82	45	30	7	35	266	252	+14	97
3	PA	Vegas Golden Knights	82	43	31	8	34	266	248	+18	94
4	PA	Vancouver Canucks	82	40	30	12	32	249	236	+13	92
5	CE	Winnipeg Jets	82	39	32	11	32	252	257	−5	89
6	PA	San Jose Sharks	82	32	37	13	22	214	264	−50	77
7	PA	Anaheim Ducks	82	31	37	14	22	232	271	−39	76
8	CE	Chicago Blackhawks	82	28	42	12	16	219	291	−72	68
9	PA	Seattle Kraken	82	27	49	6	23	216	285	−69	60
10	CE	Arizona Coyotes	82	25	50	7	18	207	313	−106	57

Source: National Hockey League
Rules for classification: 1) Fewer number of games played (GP, only during regular season); 2) Greater number of regulation wins (RW); 3) Greater number of wins in regulation and overtime, excluding shootout wins (ROW); 4) Greater number of total wins, including shootouts (W); 5) Greater number of points earned in head-to-head play; if teams played an uneven number of head-to-head games, the result of the first game on the home ice of the team with the extra home game is discarded; 6) Greater goal differential (GD); 7) Greater number of goals scored (GF)
x – Clinched playoff spot

== Schedule and results ==
=== Regular season ===
The regular season schedule was published on July 22, 2021.

2021–22 game log

October: 6–1–0 (home: 3–1–0; road: 3–0–0)
#	Date	Visitor	Score	Home	OT	Decision	Attendance	Record	Pts	Recap
1	October 16	St. Louis	5–3	Colorado		Binnington	18,022	1–0–0	2
2	October 18	St. Louis	7–4	Arizona		Binnington	15,235	2–0–0	4
3	October 20	St. Louis	3–1	Vegas		Binnington	17,690	3–0–0	6
4	October 23	Los Angeles	3–7	St. Louis		Binnington	18,096	4–0–0	8
5	October 25	Los Angeles	0–3	St. Louis		Husso	16,055	5–0–0	10
6	October 28	Colorado	4–3	St. Louis		Binnington	16,558	5–1–0	10
7	October 30	Chicago	0–1	St. Louis		Binnington	16,856	6–1–0	12

November: 6–6–3 (home: 4–2–1; road: 2–4–2)
#	Date	Visitor	Score	Home	OT	Decision	Attendance	Record	Pts	Recap
8	November 3	St. Louis	2–3	Los Angeles	SO	Binnington	11,756	6–1–1	13
9	November 4	St. Louis	5–3	San Jose		Hofer	11,816	7–1–1	15
10	November 7	St. Louis	1–4	Anaheim		Binnington	12,056	7–2–1	15
11	November 9	St. Louis	3–2	Winnipeg	SO	Binnington	14,004	8–2–1	17
12	November 11	Nashville	4–3	St. Louis	OT	Binnington	18,096	8–2–2	18
13	November 13	St. Louis	2–3	Carolina		Hofer	18,680	8–3–2	18
14	November 14	Edmonton	5–4	St. Louis		Binnington	18,096	8–4–2	18
15	November 16	Arizona	3–2	St. Louis		Binnington	16,738	8–5–2	18
16	November 18	San Jose	1–4	St. Louis		Husso	16,953	9–5–2	20
17	November 20	St. Louis	1–4	Dallas		Binnington	18,532	9–6–2	20
18	November 22	Vegas	2–5	St. Louis		Binnington	18,096	10–6–2	22
19	November 24	St. Louis	2–4	Detroit		Husso	18,591	10–7–2	22
20	November 26	St. Louis	2–3	Chicago	OT	Binnington	19,681	10–7–3	23
21	November 27	Columbus	3–6	St. Louis		Husso	18,096	11–7–3	25
22	November 30	Tampa Bay	3–4	St. Louis	SO	Binnington	16,605	12–7–3	27

December: 6–2–2 (home: 5–0–1; road: 1–2–1)
#	Date	Visitor	Score	Home	OT	Decision	Attendance	Record	Pts	Recap
23	December 2	St. Louis	2–4	Tampa Bay		Husso	19,092	12–8–3	27
24	December 4	St. Louis	3–4	Florida	SO	Husso	13,446	12–8–4	28
25	December 7	Florida	3–4	St. Louis	OT	Lindgren	16,732	13–8–4	30
26	December 9	Detroit	2–6	St. Louis		Lindgren	18,096	14–8–4	32
27	December 11	Montreal	1–4	St. Louis		Lindgren	16,829	15–8–4	34
28	December 12	Anaheim	3–2	St. Louis	OT	Gillies	17,010	15–8–5	35
29	December 14	St. Louis	4–1	Dallas		Lindgren	18,012	16–8–5	37
30	December 17	Dallas	1–4	St. Louis		Lindgren	16,852	17–8–5	39
31	December 19	St. Louis	2–4	Winnipeg		Binnington	13,524	17–9–5	39
—	December 21	St. Louis	–	Ottawa	Postponed due to cross-border traveling. Moved to February 15.
—	December 23	St. Louis	–	Toronto	Postponed due to cross-border traveling. Moved to February 19.
—	December 27	New Jersey	–	St. Louis	Postponed due to COVID-19. Moved to February 10.
32	December 29	Edmonton	2–4	St. Louis		Binnington	18,096	18–9–5	41

January: 8–4–0 (home: 5–2–0; road: 3–2–0)
#	Date	Visitor	Score	Home	OT	Decision	Attendance	Record	Pts	Recap
33	January 1	St. Louis	6–4	Minnesota		Binnington	38,619 (outdoors)	19–9–5	43
34	January 5	St. Louis	3–5	Pittsburgh		Binnington	17,921	19–10–5	43
35	January 7	Washington	1–5	St. Louis		Husso	18,096	20–10–5	45
36	January 9	Dallas	1–2	St. Louis		Binnington	18,096	21–10–5	47
37	January 13	Seattle	1–2	St. Louis		Husso	17,017	22–10–5	49
38	January 15	Toronto	6–5	St. Louis		Binnington	18,096	22–11–5	49
39	January 17	Nashville	3–5	St. Louis		Husso	18,096	23–11–5	51
40	January 21	St. Louis	5–0	Seattle		Husso	17,151	24–11–5	53
41	January 23	St. Louis	3–1	Vancouver		Husso	9,424	25–11–5	55
42	January 24	St. Louis	1–7	Calgary		Binnington	9,039	25–12–5	55
43	January 27	Calgary	1–5	St. Louis		Husso	18,096	26–12–5	57
44	January 29	Winnipeg	4–1	St. Louis		Husso	18,096	26–13–5	57

February: 6–1–1 (home: 2–1–0; road: 4–0–1)
#	Date	Visitor	Score	Home	OT	Decision	Attendance	Record	Pts	Recap
45	February 10	New Jersey	7–4	St. Louis		Binnington	18,096	26–14–5	57
46	February 12	Chicago	5–1	St. Louis		Husso	18,096	27–14–5	59
47	February 15	St. Louis	5–2	Ottawa		Husso	500	28–14–5	61
48	February 17	St. Louis	2–3	Montreal	OT	Husso	500	28–14–6	62
49	February 19	St. Louis	6–3	Toronto		Husso	9,098	29–14–6	64
50	February 22	St. Louis	4–1	Philadelphia		Binnington	14,929	30–14–6	66
51	February 25	Buffalo	3–5	St. Louis		Husso	18,096	31–14–6	68
52	February 27	St. Louis	4–0	Chicago		Binnington	19,588	32–14–6	70

March: 5–6–3 (home: 2–3–2; road: 3–3–1)
#	Date	Visitor	Score	Home	OT	Decision	Attendance	Record	Pts	Recap
53	March 2	St. Louis	3–5	NY Rangers		Husso	18,066	32–15–6	70
54	March 5	St. Louis	1–2	NY Islanders		Binnington	17,255	32–16–6	70
55	March 6	St. Louis	2–3	New Jersey	OT	Husso	14,293	32–16–7	71
56	March 8	Ottawa	4–1	St. Louis		Binnington	18,096	32–17–7	71
57	March 10	NY Rangers	2–6	St. Louis		Husso	18,096	33–17–7	73
58	March 12	St. Louis	7–4	Nashville		Husso	17,565	34–17–7	75
59	March 13	Winnipeg	4–3	St. Louis	OT	Binnington	18,096	34–17–8	76
60	March 17	Pittsburgh	3–2	St. Louis	SO	Husso	18,096	34–17–9	77
61	March 19	St. Louis	3–4	Columbus		Husso	19,005	34–18–9	77
62	March 22	St. Louis	5–2	Washington		Husso	18,573	35–18–9	79
63	March 24	Philadelphia	5–2	St. Louis		Binnington	18,096	35–19–9	79
64	March 26	Carolina	7–2	St. Louis		Husso	18,096	35–20–9	79
65	March 28	Vancouver	1–4	St. Louis		Husso	18,096	36–20–9	81
66	March 30	St. Louis	4–3	Vancouver		Husso	18,910	37–20–9	83

April: 12–2–2 (home: 5–1–1; road: 7–1–1)
#	Date	Visitor	Score	Home	OT	Decision	Attendance	Record	Pts	Recap
67	April 1	St. Louis	5–6	Edmonton	OT	Husso	16,310	37–20–10	84
68	April 2	St. Louis	6–4	Calgary		Husso	16,422	38–20–10	86
69	April 4	Arizona	1–5	St. Louis		Husso	17,163	39–20–10	88
70	April 6	Seattle	1–4	St. Louis		Husso	18,096	40–20–10	90
71	April 8	Minnesota	3–4	St. Louis	OT	Husso	18,096	41–20–10	92
72	April 9	NY Islanders	1–6	St. Louis		Binnington	18,096	42–20–10	94
73	April 12	St. Louis	4–2	Boston		Husso	17,850	43–20–10	96
74	April 14	St. Louis	6–2	Buffalo		Binnington	11,565	44–20–10	98
75	April 16	Minnesota	5–6	St. Louis	OT	Husso	18,096	45–20–10	100
76	April 17	St. Louis	8–3	Nashville		Binnington	17,277	46–20–10	102
77	April 19	Boston	3–2	St. Louis	OT	Husso	18,096	46–20–11	103
78	April 21	St. Louis	3–1	San Jose		Binnington	12,136	47–20–11	105
79	April 23	St. Louis	5–4	Arizona	OT	Binnington	12,717	48–20–11	107
80	April 24	St. Louis	6–3	Anaheim		Husso	17,446	49–20–11	109
81	April 26	St. Louis	3–5	Colorado		Binnington	18,071	49–21–11	109
82	April 29	Vegas	7–4	St. Louis		Husso	18,096	49–22–11	109

Legend: Win (2 points) Loss (0 points) Overtime/shootout loss (1 point)

=== Playoffs ===
2022 Stanley Cup playoffs

Western Conference First Round vs. (C2) Minnesota Wild: St. Louis won 4–2
#	Date	Visitor	Score	Home	OT	Decision	Attendance	Series	Recap
1	May 2	St. Louis	4–0	Minnesota		Husso	19,053	1–0
2	May 4	St. Louis	2–6	Minnesota		Husso	19,376	1–1
3	May 6	Minnesota	5–1	St. Louis		Husso	18,096	1–2
4	May 8	Minnesota	2–5	St. Louis		Binnington	18,096	2–2
5	May 10	St. Louis	5–2	Minnesota		Binnington	19,197	3–2
6	May 12	Minnesota	1–5	St. Louis		Binnington	18,096	4–2

Western Conference Second Round vs. (C1) Colorado Avalanche: Colorado won 4–2
#	Date	Visitor	Score	Home	OT	Decision	Attendance	Series	Recap
1	May 17	St. Louis	2–3	Colorado	OT	Binnington	18,105	0–1
2	May 19	St. Louis	4–1	Colorado		Binnington	18,117	1–1
3	May 21	Colorado	5–2	St. Louis		Husso	18,096	1–2
4	May 23	Colorado	6–3	St. Louis		Husso	18,096	1–3
5	May 25	St. Louis	5–4	Colorado	OT	Husso	18,117	2–3
6	May 27	Colorado	3–2	St. Louis		Husso	18,096	2–4

Legend: Win Loss

== Player statistics ==
=== Skaters ===
Regular season
Player	GP	G	A	Pts	+/−	PIM
Vladimir Tarasenko	75	34	48	82	+7	32
Robert Thomas	72	20	57	77	+17	16
Pavel Buchnevich	73	30	46	76	+29	34
Jordan Kyrou	74	27	48	75	+10	20
Ivan Barbashev	81	26	34	60	+4	40
Brayden Schenn	62	24	34	58	+21	33
Ryan O'Reilly	78	21	37	58	+11	12
David Perron	67	27	30	57	+8	48
Brandon Saad	78	24	25	49	+11	10
Justin Faulk	76	16	31	47	+41	43
Torey Krug	64	9	34	43	+23	48
Colton Parayko	80	6	29	35	+16	18
Oskar Sundqvist^{‡}	41	4	11	15	+4	12
Marco Scandella	70	3	11	14	+17	18
Niko Mikkola	54	3	10	13	−6	55
Nathan Walker	30	8	4	12	+1	2
Tyler Bozak	50	3	9	12	−11	14
Logan Brown	39	4	7	11	−3	8
Klim Kostin	40	4	5	9	−3	23
Dakota Joshua	30	3	5	8	+6	16
Nick Leddy^{†}	20	2	6	8	+3	6
Calle Rosen	18	2	5	7	−2	4
Jake Walman	32	3	3	6	+3	6
Robert Bortuzzo	73	1	5	6	−4	36
Scott Perunovich	19	0	6	6	+2	8
James Neal	19	2	2	4	−1	0
Alexey Toropchenko	28	2	0	2	−9	15
Jake Neighbours	9	1	1	2	−2	2
Mackenzie MacEachern	14	0	2	2	−1	4
Kyle Clifford^{‡}	2	0	1	1	−1	0
Matthew Peca	5	0	1	1	−1	0

Playoffs
Player	GP	G	A	Pts	+/−	PIM
David Perron	12	9	4	13	0	10
Ryan O'Reilly	12	7	5	12	+3	2
Pavel Buchnevich	12	1	10	11	−3	6
Jordan Kyrou	12	7	2	9	−4	4
Vladimir Tarasenko	12	6	3	9	−2	0
Justin Faulk	12	1	7	8	−2	10
Brayden Schenn	12	0	8	8	−1	14
Robert Thomas	12	2	4	6	−6	10
Colton Parayko	12	2	3	5	+5	6
Brandon Saad	12	2	3	5	+1	4
Nick Leddy	9	1	4	5	+4	2
Scott Perunovich	7	0	4	4	−4	0
Torey Krug	3	0	3	3	+1	0
Tyler Bozak	12	2	0	2	−1	0
Alexey Toropchenko	12	0	2	2	+2	2
Ivan Barbashev	12	0	2	2	−6	4
Niko Mikkola	12	0	1	1	0	8
Calle Rosen	9	0	0	0	−2	2
Dakota Joshua	1	0	0	0	0	0
Nathan Walker	4	0	0	0	+1	2
Steven Santini	1	0	0	0	+1	0
Marco Scandella	4	0	0	0	−3	0
Robert Bortuzzo	10	0	0	0	−1	6

=== Goaltenders ===
Regular season
Player	GP	GS	TOI	W	L	OT	GA	GAA	SA	SV%	SO	G	A	PIM
Ville Husso	40	38	2,341:14	25	7	6	100	2.56	1,236	.919	2	0	0	0
Jordan Binnington	37	37	2,144:57	18	14	4	112	3.13	1,135	.901	2	0	0	14
Charlie Lindgren	5	4	246:25	5	0	0	5	1.22	118	.958	0	0	0	0
Joel Hofer	2	2	117:09	1	1	0	6	3.07	50	.880	0	0	1	0
Jon Gillies^{‡}	1	1	63:46	0	0	1	3	2.82	39	.923	0	0	0	0

Playoffs
Player	GP	GS	TOI	W	L	GA	GAA	SA	SV%	SO	G	A	PIM
Jordan Binnington	6	6	314:47	4	1	9	1.72	176	.949	0	0	0	0
Ville Husso	7	6	409:16	2	5	25	3.67	228	.890	1	0	0	0

^{†}Denotes player spent time with another team before joining the Blues. Stats reflect time with the Blues only.
^{‡}Denotes player was traded mid-season. Stats reflect time with the Blues only.
Bold/italics denotes franchise record.

== Transactions ==
The Blues have been involved in the following transactions during the 2021–22 season.

=== Trades ===
Date	Details		Ref
July 23, 2021	To New York Rangers Samuel Blais; 2nd-round pick in 2022	To St. Louis Blues Pavel Buchnevich	
July 24, 2021	To San Jose Sharks 3rd-round pick in 2021; 6th-round pick in 2022	To St. Louis Blues 3rd-round pick in 2021	
November 16, 2021	To Toronto Maple Leafs Kyle Clifford	To St. Louis Blues Future Considerations	
December 15, 2021	To New Jersey Devils Jon Gillies	To St. Louis Blues Future Considerations	
December 29, 2021	To Minnesota Wild Nolan Stevens	To St. Louis Blues William Bitten	
March 21, 2022	To Detroit Red Wings Oskar Sundqvist; Jake Walman; 2nd-round pick in 2023	To St. Louis Blues Nick Leddy; Luke Witkowski	
March 28, 2022	To Boston Bruins Future considerations	To St. Louis Blues Brady Lyle	

=== Players acquired ===
Date	Player	Former team	Term	Via	Ref
July 29, 2021	Charlie Lindgren	Montreal Canadiens	1-year	Free agency	
July 29, 2021	Matthew Peca	Ottawa Senators	1-year	Free agency	
July 29, 2021	Brandon Saad	Colorado Avalanche	5-year	Free agency	
July 29, 2021	Nathan Todd	Manitoba Moose (AHL)	1-year	Free agency	
July 30, 2021	Tommy Cross	Florida Panthers	1-year	Free agency	
July 30, 2021	Calle Rosen	Toronto Maple Leafs	1-year	Free agency	
September 9, 2021	David Backes	Anaheim Ducks	1-day	Free agency	
October 9, 2021	James Neal	Edmonton Oilers	1-year	Free agency	
December 8, 2021	Jon Gillies	Maine Mariners (ECHL)	1-year	Free agency	

=== Players lost ===
Date	Player	New team	Term	Via	Ref
July 21, 2021	Vince Dunn	Seattle Kraken		Expansion draft	
July 28, 2021	Mike Hoffman	Montreal Canadiens	3-year	Free agency	
July 31, 2021	Austin Poganski	Winnipeg Jets	1-year	Free agency	
August 2, 2021	Evan Fitzpatrick	Charlotte Checkers (AHL)	2-year	Free agency	
August 6, 2021	Curtis McKenzie	Texas Stars (AHL)	2-year	Free agency	
August 17, 2021	Evan Polei	Manitoba Moose (AHL)	2-year	Free agency	
September 2, 2021	Mitch Reinke	Wilkes-Barre/Scranton Penguins (AHL)	1-year	Free agency	
September 9, 2021	David Backes			Retirement	
June 26, 2022	Tommy Cross	Springfield Thunderbirds (AHL)	1-year	Free agency	

=== Signings ===
Date	Player	Term	Contract type	Ref
July 23, 2021	Nolan Stevens	1-year	Re-signing	
July 26, 2021	Nathan Walker	2-year	Re-signing	
July 27, 2021	Pavel Buchnevich	2-year	Re-signing	
July 30, 2021	Ivan Barbashev	2-year	Re-signing	
July 31, 2021	Dakota Joshua	1-year	Re-signing	
August 3, 2021	Jordan Kyrou	2-year	Re-signing	
August 4, 2021	Zach Sanford	1-year	Re-signing	
August 23, 2021	Zachary Bolduc	3-year	Entry-level	
August 31, 2021	Tanner Dickinson	3-year	Entry-level	
September 1, 2021	Colton Parayko	8-year	Extension	
September 14, 2021	Tyler Bozak	1-year	Re-signing	
September 21, 2021	Robert Thomas	2-year	Re-signing	
February 8, 2022	Robert Bortuzzo	2-year	Extension	
February 8, 2022	Logan Brown	1-year	Extension	
February 9, 2022	Alexey Toropchenko	1-year	Extension	
March 2, 2022	Will Cranley	3-year	Entry-level	
March 24, 2022	Matthew Peca	2-year	Extension	
March 27, 2022	Matt Kessel	2-year	Extension	
May 17, 2022	Vadim Zherenko	3-year	Entry-level	

== Draft picks ==
Below are the St. Louis Blues' selections at the 2021 NHL entry draft, which were held on July 23 to 24, 2021. It was held virtually via Video conference call from the NHL Network studio in Secaucus, New Jersey.

Round	#	Player	Pos.	Nationality	Team (League)
1	17	Zachary Bolduc	C	Canada	Saint John Sea Dogs (QMJHL)
3	71	Simon Robertsson	RW	Sweden	Skelleftea AIK (SHL)
5	145	Tyson Galloway	D	Canada	Calgary Hitmen (WHL)
7	198	Ivan Vorobyov	RW	Russia	Mamonty Yugry (MHL)
