= 2021–22 New York Islanders season =

National Hockey League season

2021–22 New York Islanders
- Division: 5th Metropolitan
- Conference: 9th Eastern
- 2021–22 record: 37–35–10
- Home record: 20–16–5
- Road record: 17–19–5
- Goals for: 231
- Goals against: 237

Team information
- General manager: Lou Lamoriello
- Coach: Barry Trotz
- Captain: Anders Lee
- Alternate captains: Josh Bailey; Cal Clutterbuck
- Arena: UBS Arena
- Average attendance: 16,942
- Minor league affiliates: Bridgeport Islanders (AHL); Worcester Railers (ECHL)

Team leaders
- Goals: Brock Nelson (37)
- Assists: Mathew Barzal (44)
- Points: Mathew Barzal; Brock Nelson (59)
- Penalty minutes: Zdeno Chára (85)
- Plus/minus: Adam Pelech (+20)
- Wins: Ilya Sorokin (26)
- Goals against average: Ilya Sorokin (2.40)

The 2021–22 New York Islanders season was the 50th season in the franchise's history. It was their first season in UBS Arena. Before the season, the Islanders lost Jordan Eberle to the Seattle Kraken in the 2021 NHL expansion draft.

On April 17, 2022, the Islanders were eliminated from playoff contention following a 4–2 loss to the Toronto Maple Leafs. After the season ended, the Islanders fired Barry Trotz as their head coach, ending his four-year tenure.

== Standings ==
=== Divisional standings ===
Metropolitan Division
Pos	Team	GP	W	L	OTL	RW	GF	GA	GD	Pts
1	y – Carolina Hurricanes	82	54	20	8	47	278	202	+76	116
2	x – New York Rangers	82	52	24	6	44	254	207	+47	110
3	x – Pittsburgh Penguins	82	46	25	11	37	272	229	+43	103
4	x – Washington Capitals	82	44	26	12	35	275	245	+30	100
5	New York Islanders	82	37	35	10	34	231	237	−6	84
6	Columbus Blue Jackets	82	37	38	7	26	262	300	−38	81
7	New Jersey Devils	82	27	46	9	19	248	307	−59	63
8	Philadelphia Flyers	82	25	46	11	20	211	298	−87	61

Source: National Hockey League
Rules for classification: 1) Fewer number of games played (GP, only during regular season); 2) Greater number of regulation wins (RW); 3) Greater number of wins in regulation and overtime, excluding shootout wins (ROW); 4) Greater number of total wins, including shootouts (W); 5) Greater number of points earned in head-to-head play; if teams played an uneven number of head-to-head games, the result of the first game on the home ice of the team with the extra home game is discarded; 6) Greater goal differential (GD); 7) Greater number of goals scored (GF)
x – Clinched playoff spot; y – Clinched division

=== Conference standings ===
Eastern Conference Wild Card
Pos	Div	Team	GP	W	L	OTL	RW	GF	GA	GD	Pts
1	AT	x – Boston Bruins	82	51	26	5	40	255	220	+35	107
2	ME	x – Washington Capitals	82	44	26	12	35	275	245	+30	100
3	ME	New York Islanders	82	37	35	10	34	231	237	−6	84
4	ME	Columbus Blue Jackets	82	37	38	7	26	262	300	−38	81
5	AT	Buffalo Sabres	82	32	39	11	25	232	290	−58	75
6	AT	Detroit Red Wings	82	32	40	10	21	230	312	−82	74
7	AT	Ottawa Senators	82	33	42	7	26	227	266	−39	73
8	ME	New Jersey Devils	82	27	46	9	19	248	307	−59	63
9	ME	Philadelphia Flyers	82	25	46	11	20	211	298	−87	61
10	AT	Montreal Canadiens	82	22	49	11	16	221	319	−98	55

Source: National Hockey League
Rules for classification: 1) Fewer number of games played (GP, only during regular season); 2) Greater number of regulation wins (RW); 3) Greater number of wins in regulation and overtime, excluding shootout wins (ROW); 4) Greater number of total wins, including shootouts (W); 5) Greater number of points earned in head-to-head play; if teams played an uneven number of head-to-head games, the result of the first game on the home ice of the team with the extra home game is discarded; 6) Greater goal differential (GD); 7) Greater number of goals scored (GF)
x – Clinched playoff spot

== Schedule and results ==
=== Preseason ===
The preseason schedule was published on August 16, 2021. The Islanders' game against the New Jersey Devils on October 7, 2021, was cancelled due to a power outage at Prudential Center in Newark, New Jersey.

2021 preseason game log: 3–0–2 (home: 1–0–2; road: 2–0–0)
#	Date	Visitor	Score	Home	OT	Decision	Attendance	Record	Recap
1	September 26	NY Islanders	4–0	NY Rangers		Sorokin	10,238	1–0–0
2	September 28	NY Islanders	3–2	Philadelphia	OT	Appleby	12,600	2–0–0
3^{[a]}	October 2	New Jersey	2–1	NY Islanders	OT	—	—	2–0–1
4^{[a]}	October 5	Philadelphia	0–3	NY Islanders		Schneider	—	3–0–1
—	October 7	NY Islanders	–	New Jersey	Cancelled due to a power outage at the arena
5^{[a]}	October 9	NY Rangers	5–4	NY Islanders	OT	Sorokin	—	3–0–2
Notes:^{a} Game was played at Webster Bank Arena in Bridgeport, Connecticut.

=== Regular season ===
The regular season schedule was published on July 22, 2021, with only about a handful of games scheduled in February because NHL players were planning to participate in the 2022 Winter Olympics. However, on December 22, the NHL announced that its players would not participate in the 2022 Winter Olympics due to the ongoing COVID-19 pandemic.

2021–22 game log

October: 3–2–2 (home: 0–0–0; road: 3–2–2)
#	Date	Visitor	Score	Home	OT	Decision	Attendance	Record	Pts	Recap
1	October 14	NY Islanders	3–6	Carolina		Sorokin	18,680	0–1–0	0
2	October 16	NY Islanders	1–5	Florida		Sorokin	12,936	0–2–0	0
3	October 19	NY Islanders	4–1	Chicago		Sorokin	20,279	1–2–0	2
4	October 21	NY Islanders	2–3	Columbus	OT	Sorokin	12,937	1–2–1	3
5	October 23	NY Islanders	3–0	Arizona		Sorokin	11,690	2–2–1	5
6	October 24	NY Islanders	2–0	Vegas		Sorokin	17,699	3–2–1	7
7	October 30	NY Islanders	2–3	Nashville	SO	Sorokin	17,159	3–2–2	8

November: 2–8–0 (home: 0–4–0; road: 2–4–0)
#	Date	Visitor	Score	Home	OT	Decision	Attendance	Record	Pts	Recap
8	November 4	NY Islanders	6–2	Montreal		Sorokin	19,924	4–2–2	10
9	November 6	NY Islanders	2–0	Winnipeg		Sorokin	13,424	5–2–2	12
10	November 7	NY Islanders	2–5	Minnesota		Varlamov	15,547	5–3–2	12
11	November 11	NY Islanders	0–4	New Jersey		Sorokin	13,816	5–4–2	12
12	November 15	NY Islanders	1–4	Tampa Bay		Varlamov	19,092	5–5–2	12
13	November 16	NY Islanders	1–6	Florida		Sorokin	14,003	5–6–2	12
14	November 20	Calgary	5–2	NY Islanders		Varlamov	17,255	5–7–2	12
15	November 21	Toronto	3–0	NY Islanders		Sorokin	17,255	5–8–2	12
16	November 24	NY Rangers	4–1	NY Islanders		Varlamov	17,255	5–9–2	12
17	November 26	Pittsburgh	1–0	NY Islanders		Sorokin	17,255	5–10–2	12
—	November 28	NY Islanders	–	NY Rangers	Postponed due to COVID-19 protocol; moved to March 17
—	November 30	NY Islanders	–	Philadelphia	Postponed due to COVID-19 protocol; moved to January 18

December: 4–2–4 (home: 3–1–3; road: 1–1–1)
#	Date	Visitor	Score	Home	OT	Decision	Attendance	Record	Pts	Recap
18	December 2	San Jose	2–1	NY Islanders	OT	Sorokin	17,255	5–10–3	13
19	December 4	NY Islanders	3–4	Detroit	OT	Sorokin	19,152	5–10–4	14
20	December 5	Chicago	3–2	NY Islanders	SO	Varlamov	17,255	5–10–5	15
21	December 7	NY Islanders	5–3	Ottawa		Sorokin	10,229	6–10–5	17
22	December 9	Nashville	4–3	NY Islanders		Varlamov	17,255	6–11–5	17
23	December 11	New Jersey	2–4	NY Islanders		Sorokin	17,255	7–11–5	19
24	December 14	NY Islanders	1–2	Detroit		Sorokin	16,884	7–12–5	19
25	December 16	Boston	1–3	NY Islanders		Varlamov	17,255	8–12–5	21
26	December 19	Vegas	4–3	NY Islanders	SO	Sorokin	17,255	8–12–6	22
—	December 20	Montreal	–	NY Islanders	Postponed due to COVID-19 protocol; moved to February 20
—	December 23	Washington	–	NY Islanders	Postponed due to COVID-19 protocol; moved to April 28
—	December 27	NY Islanders	–	Buffalo	Postponed due to COVID-19 protocol; moved to February 15
—	December 29	Detroit	–	NY Islanders	Postponed due to COVID-19 protocol; moved to March 24
27	December 30	Buffalo	1–4	NY Islanders		Varlamov	17,255	9–12–6	24

January: 6–4–0 (home: 5–4–0; road: 1–0–0)
#	Date	Visitor	Score	Home	OT	Decision	Attendance	Record	Pts	Recap
28	January 1	Edmonton	2–3	NY Islanders	OT	Sorokin	17,255	10–12–6	26
—	January 4	NY Islanders	–	Seattle	Postponed due to COVID-19 protocol; moved to February 22
—	January 5	NY Islanders	–	Vancouver	Postponed due to COVID-19 protocol; moved to February 9
—	January 8	NY Islanders	–	Edmonton	Postponed due to COVID-19 protocol; moved to February 11
—	January 11	NY Islanders	–	Calgary	Postponed due to COVID-19 protocol; moved to February 12
29	January 13	New Jersey	2–3	NY Islanders		Sorokin	17,255	11–12–6	28
30	January 15	Washington	2–0	NY Islanders		Varlamov	17,255	11–13–6	28
31	January 17	Philadelphia	1–4	NY Islanders		Sorokin	17,255	12–13–6	30
32	January 18	NY Islanders	4–3	Philadelphia	SO	Varlamov	16,362	13–13–6	32
33	January 21	Arizona	0–4	NY Islanders		Sorokin	17,255	14–13–6	34
34	January 22	Toronto	3–1	NY Islanders		Varlamov	17,255	14–14–6	34
35	January 25	Philadelphia	3–4	NY Islanders		Sorokin	17,255	15–14–6	36
36	January 27	Los Angeles	3–2	NY Islanders		Varlamov	17,255	15–15–6	36
—	January 29	Seattle	–	NY Islanders	Postponed due to January 2022 blizzard; moved to February 2
37	January 30	Minnesota	4–3	NY Islanders		Sorokin	15,518	15–16–6	36

February: 5–5–2 (home: 2–1–1; road: 3–4–1)
#	Date	Visitor	Score	Home	OT	Decision	Attendance	Record	Pts	Recap
38	February 1	Ottawa	1–4	NY Islanders		Sorokin	15,258	16–16–6	38
39	February 2	Seattle	3–0	NY Islanders		Varlamov	17,255	16–17–6	38
40	February 9	NY Islanders	6–3	Vancouver		Sorokin	9,268	17–17–6	40
41	February 11	NY Islanders	1–3	Edmonton		Sorokin	9,150	17–18–6	40
42	February 12	NY Islanders	2–5	Calgary		Sorokin	9,639	17–19–6	40
43	February 15	NY Islanders	3–6	Buffalo		Sorokin	9,296	17–20–6	40
44	February 17	Boston	1–4	NY Islanders		Sorokin	16,518	18–20–6	42
45	February 20	Montreal	3–2	NY Islanders	SO	Sorokin	17,255	18–20–7	43
46	February 22	NY Islanders	5–2	Seattle		Sorokin	17,151	19–20–7	45
47	February 24	NY Islanders	3–4	San Jose	SO	Sorokin	11,283	19–20–8	46
48	February 26	NY Islanders	2–5	Los Angeles		Varlamov	18,230	19–21–8	46
49	February 27	NY Islanders	4–0	Anaheim		Sorokin	14,173	20–21–8	48

March: 10–6–1 (home: 8–3–0; road: 2–3–1)
#	Date	Visitor	Score	Home	OT	Decision	Attendance	Record	Pts	Recap
50	March 1	NY Islanders	3–5	Colorado		Sorokin	17,622	20–22–8	48
51	March 3	Vancouver	4–3	NY Islanders		Varlamov	16,412	20–23–8	48
52	March 5	St. Louis	1–2	NY Islanders		Sorokin	17,255	21–23–8	50
53	March 7	Colorado	5–4	NY Islanders		Varlamov	16,378	21–24–8	50
54	March 10	Columbus	0–6	NY Islanders		Sorokin	16,048	22–24–8	52
55	March 11	Winnipeg	2–5	NY Islanders		Varlamov	17,255	23–24–8	54
56	March 13	Anaheim	3–4	NY Islanders		Sorokin	17,255	24–24–8	56
57	March 15	NY Islanders	3–4	Washington	SO	Varlamov	18,573	24–24–9	57
58	March 17	NY Islanders	2–1	NY Rangers		Sorokin	18,006	25–24–9	59
59	March 19	Dallas	2–4	NY Islanders		Varlamov	17,255	26–24–9	61
60	March 20	NY Islanders	1–2	Philadelphia		Sorokin	17,218	26–25–9	61
61	March 22	Ottawa	0–3	NY Islanders		Varlamov	15,856	27–25–9	63
62	March 24	Detroit	2–5	NY Islanders		Sorokin	16,429	28–25–9	65
63	March 26	NY Islanders	3–6	Boston		Varlamov	17,850	28–26–9	65
64	March 27	Tampa Bay	4–1	NY Islanders		Sorokin	17,255	28–27–9	65
65	March 29	NY Islanders	4–3	Columbus		Varlamov	15,557	29–27–9	67
66	March 31	Columbus	2–5	NY Islanders		Varlamov	17,255	30–27–9	69

April: 7–8–1 (home: 2–3–1; road: 5–5–0)
#	Date	Visitor	Score	Home	OT	Decision	Attendance	Record	Pts	Recap
67	April 1	NY Islanders	3–0	NY Rangers		Varlamov	17,325	31–27–9	71
68	April 3	NY Islanders	4–3	New Jersey		Schneider	14,620	32–27–9	73
69	April 5	NY Islanders	2–3	Dallas		Varlamov	17,876	32–28–9	73
70	April 8	NY Islanders	2–1	Carolina		Sorokin	17,279	33–28–9	75
71	April 9	NY Islanders	1–6	St. Louis		Varlamov	18,096	33–29–9	75
72	April 12	Pittsburgh	4–5	NY Islanders	SO	Sorokin	15,924	34–29–9	77
73	April 14	NY Islanders	3–6	Pittsburgh		Sorokin	18,236	34–30–9	77
74	April 15	NY Islanders	3–0	Montreal		Sorokin	21,105	35–30–9	79
75	April 17	NY Islanders	2–4	Toronto		Sorokin	17,464	35–31–9	79
76	April 19	Florida	3–2	NY Islanders	OT	Sorokin	17,255	35–31–10	80
77	April 21	NY Rangers	6–3	NY Islanders		Varlamov	17,255	35–32–10	80
78	April 23	NY Islanders	3–5	Buffalo		Sorokin	12,955	35–33–10	80
79	April 24	Carolina	5–2	NY Islanders		Varlamov	15,945	35–34–10	80
80	April 26	NY Islanders	4–1	Washington		Sorokin	18,573	36–34–10	82
81	April 28	Washington	1–5	NY Islanders		Varlamov	16,722	37–34–10	84
82	April 29	Tampa Bay	6–4	NY Islanders		Sorokin	17,255	37–35–10	84

Legend: Win (2 points) Loss (0 points) Overtime/shootout loss (1 point)

== Player statistics ==
As of May 1, 2022

=== Skaters ===
Regular season
Player	GP	G	A	Pts	+/−	PIM
Brock Nelson	72	37	22	59	–5	33
Mathew Barzal	73	15	44	59	–15	18
Noah Dobson	80	13	38	51	–3	18
Anders Lee	76	28	18	46	–11	34
Josh Bailey	74	14	30	44	–7	6
Jean-Gabriel Pageau	77	18	21	39	0	30
Zach Parise	82	15	20	35	–2	28
Anthony Beauvillier	75	12	22	34	–10	12
Kyle Palmieri	69	15	18	33	0	57
Adam Pelech	78	3	25	28	+20	42
Oliver Wahlstrom	73	13	11	24	–6	74
Ryan Pulock	56	5	16	21	0	2
Kieffer Bellows	45	6	13	19	–1	19
Scott Mayfield	61	3	15	18	–5	55
Casey Cizikas	74	10	6	16	–3	48
Cal Clutterbuck	59	6	9	15	–6	10
Zdeno Chára	72	2	12	14	+8	85
Sebastian Aho	36	2	10	12	–6	10
Andy Greene	69	2	8	10	–13	10
Matt Martin	71	3	4	7	–2	70
Ross Johnston	32	2	5	7	–3	44
Austin Czarnik	11	2	3	5	+5	0
Robin Salo	21	1	4	5	–6	4
Otto Koivula	8	0	2	2	–2	0
Andy Andreoff	6	1	0	1	–1	0
Grant Hutton	16	1	0	1	–1	4
Richard Pánik	4	0	1	1	–2	0
Leo Komarov	1	0	0	0	0	2
Thomas Hickey	2	0	0	0	–3	0
Paul LaDue	1	0	0	0	–2	0
Michael Dal Colle	1	0	0	0	+1	0

=== Goaltenders ===
Regular season
Player	GP	GS	TOI	W	L	OT	GA	GAA	SA	SV%	SO	G	A	PIM
Ilya Sorokin	52	52	3,072:17	26	18	8	123	2.40	1,643	.925	7	0	0	0
Semyon Varlamov	31	29	1,792:17	10	17	2	87	2.91	978	.911	2	0	0	0
Cory Schneider	1	1	60:00	1	0	0	3	3.00	30	.900	0	0	0	0

- ^{†} Denotes player spent time with another team before joining the Islanders. Stats reflect time with the Islanders only.
- ^{‡} Denotes player was traded mid-season. Stats reflect time with the Islanders only.
- Bold/italics denotes franchise record.

== Transactions ==
The Islanders have been involved in the following transactions during the 2021–22 season.

=== Trades ===
Date	Details		Ref
July 16, 2021	To Detroit Red Wings Nick Leddy	To New York Islanders Richard Pánik; EDM's 2nd-round pick in 2021	
July 17, 2021	To Arizona Coyotes Andrew Ladd; COL's 2nd-round pick in 2021; 2nd-round pick in 2022; Conditional 3rd-round pick in 2023	To New York Islanders Future considerations	
November 4, 2021	Buffalo Sabres Johnny Boychuk	To New York Islanders Future considerations	

=== Free agents ===
Date	Player	Team	Contract term	Ref
August 26, 2021	Robert Carpenter	to Milwaukee Admirals (AHL)	1-year	
September 15, 2021	Tanner Fritz	to Hartford Wolf Pack (AHL)	1-year	
September 10, 2021	Zach Parise	from Minnesota Wild	—	
September 18, 2021	Zdeno Chára	from Washington Capitals	1-year	
September 20, 2021	Andy Andreoff	from Philadelphia Flyers	1-year	
September 20, 2021	Paul LaDue	from Washington Capitals (Note: Was under contract with the Capitals, but played for their AHL affiliate during the 2020–21 season.)	1-year	
October 5, 2021	Josh Ho-Sang	to Toronto Marlies (AHL)	1-year	

=== Waivers ===
Date	Player	Team	Ref
February 8, 2022	Austin Czarnik	to Seattle Kraken	
March 6, 2022	Austin Czarnik	from Seattle Kraken	

=== Contract terminations ===
Date	Player	Via	Ref
October 19, 2021	Dmytro Timashov	Mutual termination	
November 14, 2021	Leo Komarov	Mutual termination	
December 9, 2021	Anatolii Golyshev	Mutual termination	

=== Retirement ===
Date	Player	Ref
September 20, 2021	Travis Zajac	
November 12, 2021	Braydon Coburn	

=== Signings ===
Date	Player	Contract term	Ref
August 6, 2021	Adam Pelech	8-year	
August 14, 2021	Aatu Räty	3-year	
September 1, 2021	Anthony Beauvillier	3-year	
September 1, 2021	Casey Cizikas	6-year	
September 1, 2021	Kyle Palmieri	4-year	
September 1, 2021	Ilya Sorokin	3-year	
September 20, 2021	Cole Bardreau	2-year	
September 20, 2021	Otto Koivula	1-year	
September 20, 2021	Dmytro Timashov	1-year	
September 21, 2021	Kieffer Bellows	—	
September 21, 2021	Michael Dal Colle	—	
September 21, 2021	Cory Schneider	—	
October 14, 2021	Ryan Pulock	8-year	
October 26, 2021	Ross Johnston	4-year	
March 21, 2022	Cal Clutterbuck	2-year	
March 21, 2022	Zach Parise	1-year	
April 21, 2022	William Dufour	3-year	
May 25, 2022	Ruslan Iskhakov	2-year	

== Draft picks ==
Below are the New York Islanders' selections at the 2021 NHL entry draft, which was held on July 23 and 24, 2021, in a remote format, with teams convening via videoconferencing, and Commissioner Gary Bettman announcing selections from the NHL Network studios in Secaucus, New Jersey.

Round	#	Player	Pos	Nationality	College/junior/club team
2	52^{1}	Aatu Räty	C	Finland	Oulun Kärpät (Liiga)
3	93	Tristan Lennox	G	Canada	Saginaw Spirit (OHL)
4	125	Cameron Berg	C	United States	Muskegon Lumberjacks (USHL)
5	157	Eetu Liukas	LW	Finland	HC TPS (Liiga)
6	189	Aleksi Malinen	D	Finland	JYP Jyväskylä (Liiga)
7	221	Tomáš Machů	D	Czech Republic	HC Vítkovice Ridera (ELH)

1. The Edmonton Oilers' second-round pick went to the New York Islanders as the result of a trade on July 16, 2021, that sent Nick Leddy to the Detroit Red Wings in exchange for Richard Pánik and this pick.
