= 2021–22 Washington Capitals season =

NHL ice hockey team season

2021–22 Washington Capitals
- Division: 4th Metropolitan
- Conference: 8th Eastern
- 2021–22 record: 44–26–12
- Home record: 19–16–6
- Road record: 25–10–6
- Goals for: 275
- Goals against: 245

Team information
- General manager: Brian MacLellan
- Coach: Peter Laviolette
- Captain: Alexander Ovechkin
- Alternate captains: Nicklas Backstrom; John Carlson
- Arena: Capital One Arena
- Average attendance: 18,573
- Minor league affiliates: Hershey Bears (AHL); South Carolina Stingrays (ECHL)

Team leaders
- Goals: Alexander Ovechkin (50)
- Assists: John Carlson; Evgeny Kuznetsov (54)
- Points: Alexander Ovechkin (90)
- Penalty minutes: Tom Wilson (98)
- Plus/minus: Nick Jensen (+32)
- Wins: Ilya Samsonov (23)
- Goals against average: Zachary Fucale (1.75)

The 2021–22 Washington Capitals season was the 48th season for the National Hockey League (NHL) franchise that was established on June 11, 1974. On April 17, 2022, the Capitals clinched a playoff spot after the New York Islanders lost to the Toronto Maple Leafs. The eighth-seeded Capitals were defeated in the first round by the Presidents' Trophy-winning Florida Panthers in six games.

== Standings ==
=== Divisional standings ===
Metropolitan Division
Pos	Team	GP	W	L	OTL	RW	GF	GA	GD	Pts
1	y – Carolina Hurricanes	82	54	20	8	47	278	202	+76	116
2	x – New York Rangers	82	52	24	6	44	254	207	+47	110
3	x – Pittsburgh Penguins	82	46	25	11	37	272	229	+43	103
4	x – Washington Capitals	82	44	26	12	35	275	245	+30	100
5	New York Islanders	82	37	35	10	34	231	237	−6	84
6	Columbus Blue Jackets	82	37	38	7	26	262	300	−38	81
7	New Jersey Devils	82	27	46	9	19	248	307	−59	63
8	Philadelphia Flyers	82	25	46	11	20	211	298	−87	61

Source: National Hockey League
Rules for classification: 1) Fewer number of games played (GP, only during regular season); 2) Greater number of regulation wins (RW); 3) Greater number of wins in regulation and overtime, excluding shootout wins (ROW); 4) Greater number of total wins, including shootouts (W); 5) Greater number of points earned in head-to-head play; if teams played an uneven number of head-to-head games, the result of the first game on the home ice of the team with the extra home game is discarded; 6) Greater goal differential (GD); 7) Greater number of goals scored (GF)
x – Clinched playoff spot; y – Clinched division

=== Conference standings ===
Eastern Conference Wild Card
Pos	Div	Team	GP	W	L	OTL	RW	GF	GA	GD	Pts
1	AT	x – Boston Bruins	82	51	26	5	40	255	220	+35	107
2	ME	x – Washington Capitals	82	44	26	12	35	275	245	+30	100
3	ME	New York Islanders	82	37	35	10	34	231	237	−6	84
4	ME	Columbus Blue Jackets	82	37	38	7	26	262	300	−38	81
5	AT	Buffalo Sabres	82	32	39	11	25	232	290	−58	75
6	AT	Detroit Red Wings	82	32	40	10	21	230	312	−82	74
7	AT	Ottawa Senators	82	33	42	7	26	227	266	−39	73
8	ME	New Jersey Devils	82	27	46	9	19	248	307	−59	63
9	ME	Philadelphia Flyers	82	25	46	11	20	211	298	−87	61
10	AT	Montreal Canadiens	82	22	49	11	16	221	319	−98	55

Source: National Hockey League
Rules for classification: 1) Fewer number of games played (GP, only during regular season); 2) Greater number of regulation wins (RW); 3) Greater number of wins in regulation and overtime, excluding shootout wins (ROW); 4) Greater number of total wins, including shootouts (W); 5) Greater number of points earned in head-to-head play; if teams played an uneven number of head-to-head games, the result of the first game on the home ice of the team with the extra home game is discarded; 6) Greater goal differential (GD); 7) Greater number of goals scored (GF)
x – Clinched playoff spot

== Schedule and results ==
=== Regular season ===
The regular season schedule was released on July 22, 2021.

2021–22 game log
October: 5–0–3 (home: 3–0–3; road: 2–0–0)

Game	Date	Opponent	Score	OT	Decision	Attendance	Record	Points	Recap
1	October 13	New York Rangers	5–1		Vanecek	18,573	1–0–0	2	
2	October 16	Tampa Bay	1–2	OT	Vanecek	18,573	1–0–1	3	
3	October 19	Colorado	6–3		Samsonov	18,573	2–0–1	5	
4	October 21	@ New Jersey	4–1		Vanecek	12,377	3–0–1	7	
5	October 23	Calgary	3–4	OT	Samsonov	18,573	3–0–2	8	
6	October 25	@ Ottawa	7–5		Samsonov	11,387	4–0–2	10	
7	October 27	Detroit	2–3	OT	Vanecek	18,573	4–0–3	11	
8	October 29	Arizona	2–0		Samsonov	18,573	5–0–3	13	

November: 9–4–2 (home: 4–1–0; road: 5–3–2)

Game	Date	Opponent	Score	OT	Decision	Attendance	Record	Points	Recap
9	November 1	@ Tampa Bay Lightning	2–3		Vanecek	19,092	5–1–3	13	
10	November 4	@ Florida Panthers	4–5	OT	Vanecek	12,542	5–1–4	14	
11	November 6	Philadelphia Flyers	1–2		Vanecek	18,573	5–2–4	14	
12	November 8	Buffalo Sabres	5–3		Vanecek	18,573	6–2–4	16	
13	November 11	@ Detroit Red Wings	2–0		Fucale	16,812	7–2–4	18	
14	November 12	@ Columbus Blue Jackets	4–3		Samsonov	16,985	8–2–4	20	
15	November 14	Pittsburgh Penguins	6–1		Vanecek	18,573	9–2–4	22	
16	November 16	@ Anaheim Ducks	2–3	OT	Vanecek	13,456	9–2–5	23	
17	November 17	@ Los Angeles Kings	2–0		Samsonov	14,694	10–2–5	25	
18	November 20	@ San Jose Sharks	4–0		Samsonov	16,527	11–2–5	27	
19	November 21	@ Seattle Kraken	2–5		Vanecek	17,151	11–3–5	27	
20	November 24	Montreal Canadiens	6–3		Samsonov	18,573	12–3–5	29	
21	November 26	Florida Panthers	4–3		Samsonov	18,573	13–3–5	31	
22	November 28	@ Carolina Hurricanes	4–2		Samsonov	18,815	14–3–5	33	
23	November 30	@ Florida Panthers	4–5		Samsonov	12,365	14–4–5	33	

December: 6–2–2 (home: 3–2–1; road: 3–0–1)

Game	Date	Opponent	Score	OT	Decision	Attendance	Record	Points	Recap
24	December 2	Chicago Blackhawks	3–4	SO	Vanecek	18,573	14–4–6	34	
25	December 4	Columbus Blue Jackets	3–1		Samsonov	18,573	15–4–6	36	
26	December 6	Anaheim Ducks	4–3	SO	Samsonov	18,573	16–4–6	38	
27	December 10	Pittsburgh Penguins	2–4		Samsonov	18,573	16–5–6	38	
28	December 11	@ Buffalo Sabres	3–2	SO	Vanecek	9,554	17–5–6	40	
29	December 15	@ Chicago Blackhawks	4–5	OT	Samsonov	18,260	17–5–7	41	
30	December 17	@ Winnipeg Jets	5–2		Vanecek	14,039	18–5–7	43	
31	December 19	Los Angeles Kings	2–3		Vanecek	18,573	18–6–7	43	
—	December 21	@ Philadelphia Flyers	Postponed due to COVID-19. Moved to February 17.						
—	December 23	@ New York Islanders	Postponed due to COVID-19. Moved to April 28.						
—	December 27	Ottawa Senators	Postponed due to COVID-19. Moved to February 13.						
32	December 29	Nashville Predators	5–3		Samsonov	18,573	19–6–7	45	
33	December 31	@ Detroit Red Wings	3–1		Samsonov	17,721	20–6–7	47	

January: 5–6–2 (home: 2–4–1; road: 2–2–1)

Game	Date	Opponent	Score	OT	Decision	Attendance	Record	Points	Recap
34	January 2	New Jersey Devils	3–4	OT	Samsonov	18,573	20–6–8	48	
—	January 4	@ Montreal Canadiens	Postponed due to attendance restrictions. Moved to February 10.						
35	January 7	@ St. Louis Blues	1–5		Samsonov	18,096	20–7–8	48	
36	January 8	@ Minnesota Wild	2–3	SO	Fucale	19,078	20–7–9	49	
37	January 10	Boston Bruins	3–7		Fucale	18,573	20–8–9	49	
38	January 15	@ New York Islanders	2–0		Vanecek	17,255	21–8–9	51	
39	January 16	Vancouver Canucks	2–4		Samsonov	18,573	21–9–9	51	
40	January 18	Winnipeg Jets	4–3	OT	Vanecek	18,573	22–9–9	53	
41	January 20	@ Boston Bruins	3–4		Vanecek	17,850	22–10–9	53	
42	January 22	Ottawa Senators	2–3	OT	Vanecek	18,573	23–10–9	55	
43	January 24	Vegas Golden Knights	0–1		Vanecek	18,573	23–11–9	55	
44	January 26	San Jose Sharks	1–4		Samsonov	18,573	23–12–9	55	
45	January 28	@ Dallas Stars	5–0		Vanecek	18,532	24–12–9	57	

February: 4–6–0 (home: 0–4–0; road: 4–2–0)

Game	Date	Opponent	Score	OT	Decision	Attendance	Record	Points	Recap
46	February 1	@ Pittsburgh Penguins	4–3	OT	Samsonov	17,826	25–12–9	59	
47	February 2	Edmonton Oilers	3–5		Copley	18,573	25–13–9	59	
48	February 8	Columbus Blue Jackets	4–5		Samsonov	18,573	25–14–9	59	
49	February 10	@ Montreal Canadiens	5–2		Samsonov	500	26–14–9	61	
50	February 13	Ottawa Senators	1–4		Samsonov	18,573	26–15–9	61	
51	February 15	@ Nashville Predators	4–1		Samsonov	17,238	27–15–9	63	
52	February 17	@ Philadelphia Flyers	5–3		Samsonov	16,886	28–15–9	65	
53	February 24	@ New York Rangers	1–4		Samsonov	18,006	28–16–9	65	
54	February 26	@ Philadelphia Flyers	1–2		Samsonov	18,276	28–17–9	65	
55	February 28	Toronto Maple Leafs	3–5		Vanecek	18,573	28–18–9	65	

March: 9–3–1 (home: 4–3–0; road: 5–0–1)

Game	Date	Opponent	Score	OT	Decision	Attendance	Record	Points	Recap
56	March 3	Carolina Hurricanes	4–0		Vanecek	18,573	29–18–9	67	
57	March 5	Seattle Kraken	5–2		Vanecek	18,573	30–18–9	69	
58	March 8	@ Calgary Flames	5–4		Vanecek	15,628	31–18–9	71	
59	March 9	@ Edmonton Oilers	3–4	OT	Samsonov	16,368	31–18–10	72	
60	March 11	@ Vancouver Canucks	4–3	OT	Vanecek	18,814	32–18–10	74	
61	March 15	New York Islanders	4–3	SO	Vanecek	18,573	33–18–10	76	
62	March 17	@ Columbus Blue Jackets	7–2		Vanecek	15,911	34–18–10	78	
63	March 18	@ Carolina Hurricanes	4–3	SO	Samsonov	18,680	35–18–10	80	
64	March 20	Dallas Stars	2–3		Vanecek	18,573	35–19–10	80	
65	March 22	St. Louis Blues	2–5		Vanecek	18,573	35–20–10	80	
66	March 25	@ Buffalo Sabres	4–3	SO	Samsonov	9,740	36–20–10	82	
67	March 26	New Jersey Devils	4–3		Vanecek	18,573	37–20–10	84	
68	March 28	Carolina Hurricanes	1–6		Vanecek	18,573	37–21–10	84	

April: 7–5–2 (home: 3–2–1; road: 4–3–1)

Game	Date	Opponent	Score	OT	Decision	Attendance	Record	Points	Recap
69	April 3	Minnesota Wild	1–5		Vanecek	18,573	37–22–10	84	
70	April 6	Tampa Bay Lightning	4–3		Samsonov	18,573	38–22–10	86	
71	April 9	@ Pittsburgh Penguins	6–3		Samsonov	18,404	39–22–10	88	
72	April 10	Boston Bruins	4–2		Vanecek	18,573	40–22–10	90	
73	April 12	Philadelphia Flyers	9–2		Samsonov	18,573	41–22–10	92	
74	April 14	@ Toronto Maple Leafs	3–7		Samsonov	18,466	41–23–10	92	
75	April 16	@ Montreal Canadiens	8–4		Vanecek	21,105	42–23–10	94	
76	April 18	@ Colorado Avalanche	3–2		Samsonov	18,020	43–23–10	96	
77	April 20	@ Vegas Golden Knights	3–4	OT	Samsonov	18,240	43–23–11	97	
78	April 22	@ Arizona Coyotes	2–0		Vanecek	14,053	44–23–11	99	
79	April 24	Toronto Maple Leafs	3–4	SO	Vanecek	18,573	44–23–12	100	
80	April 26	New York Islanders	1–4		Samsonov	18,573	44–24–12	100	
81	April 28	@ New York Islanders	1–5		Vanecek	16,722	44–25–12	100	
82	April 29	@ New York Rangers	2–3		Samsonov	17,230	44–26–12	100	

Win (2 Points) Loss (0 points) Overtime/shootout loss (1 point)

=== Playoffs ===
2022 Stanley Cup playoffs
Eastern Conference First Round vs. (A1) Florida Panthers: Florida won 4–2

Game	Date	Opponent	Score	OT	Decision	Attendance	Series	Recap
1	May 3	@ Florida	4–2		Vanecek	19,678	1–0	
2	May 5	@ Florida	1–5		Vanecek	19,636	1–1	
3	May 7	Florida	6–1		Samsonov	18,573	2–1	
4	May 9	Florida	2–3	OT	Samsonov	18,573	2–2	
5	May 11	@ Florida	3–5		Samsonov	20,023	2–3	
6	May 13	Florida	3–4	OT	Samsonov	18,573	2–4	

Win Loss

== Player statistics ==
As of April 29, 2022

=== Skaters ===
Regular season
Player	GP	G	A	Pts	+/−	PIM
Alexander Ovechkin	77	50	40	90	+8	18
Evgeny Kuznetsov	79	24	54	78	+7	44
John Carlson	78	17	54	71	+13	20
Tom Wilson	78	24	28	52	+13	98
Conor Sheary	71	19	24	43	−2	14
Dmitry Orlov	76	12	23	35	+25	44
Lars Eller	72	13	18	31	−4	40
Nicklas Backstrom	47	6	25	31	−8	12
Garnet Hathaway	76	14	12	26	+19	57
T. J. Oshie	44	11	14	25	−12	18
Nic Dowd	64	10	14	24	+10	44
Anthony Mantha	37	9	14	23	+4	14
Justin Schultz	74	4	19	23	−15	16
Nick Jensen	76	5	16	21	+32	21
Connor McMichael	68	9	9	18	−3	10
Martin Fehervary	79	8	9	17	+15	26
Trevor van Riemsdyk	72	1	16	17	−3	40
Daniel Sprong^{‡}	47	8	6	14	+6	8
Carl Hagelin	53	3	11	14	+10	20
Aliaksei Protas	33	3	6	9	+4	0
Joe Snively	12	4	3	7	+3	2
Marcus Johansson^{†}	18	3	3	6	−4	0
Brett Leason	36	3	3	6	+1	4
Johan Larsson^{†}	14	1	5	6	−1	2
Michael Sgarbossa	10	2	2	4	+3	0
Axel Jonsson-Fjallby	23	2	2	4	0	4
Matt Irwin	17	1	3	4	0	6
Michal Kempny	15	1	1	2	−3	16
Beck Malenstyn	12	1	0	1	+2	9
Garrett Pilon	2	1	0	1	+1	0
Hendrix Lapierre	6	1	0	1	+2	2
Lucas Johansen	1	0	1	1	+1	0
Dennis Cholowski^{‡}	7	0	1	1	−4	2
Mike Vecchione	1	0	0	0	−1	0
Alexander Alexeyev	1	0	0	0	0	2

Playoffs
Player	GP	G	A	Pts	+/−	PIM
T. J. Oshie	6	6	1	7	+2	0
Nicklas Backstrom	6	2	4	6	+1	4
Alexander Ovechkin	6	1	5	6	−3	0
Evgeny Kuznetsov	6	2	3	5	−3	2
John Carlson	6	1	4	5	−5	2
Anthony Mantha	6	0	4	4	−3	13
Justin Schultz	6	1	2	3	+2	6
Lars Eller	6	1	2	3	−4	0
Garnet Hathaway	6	1	1	2	−6	16
Trevor van Riemsdyk	6	1	1	2	+3	0
Nic Dowd	6	1	1	2	−3	4
Marcus Johansson	6	1	1	2	+1	0
Johan Larsson	6	0	2	2	−2	2
Tom Wilson	1	1	0	1	0	0
Connor McMichael	4	0	1	1	0	0
Conor Sheary	6	0	1	1	−2	0
Dmitry Orlov	6	0	1	1	−4	2
Brett Leason	1	0	0	0	−1	0
Martin Fehervary	6	0	0	0	−7	8
Nick Jensen	6	0	0	0	−5	4

=== Goaltenders ===
Regular season
Player	GP	GS	TOI	W	L	OT	GA	GAA	SA	SV%	SO	G	A	PIM
Ilya Samsonov	44	39	2,361:18	23	12	5	119	3.02	1,145	.896	3	0	0	0
Vitek Vanecek	42	39	2,317:23	20	12	6	103	2.67	1,117	.908	4	0	0	0
Zachary Fucale	4	3	171:35	1	1	1	5	1.75	66	.924	1	0	0	0
Pheonix Copley	2	1	96:35	0	1	0	5	3.11	41	.878	0	0	0	0

Playoffs
Player	GP	GS	TOI	W	L	GA	GAA	SA	SV%	SO	G	A	PIM
Ilya Samsonov	5	4	262:54	1	3	13	2.97	148	.912	0	0	0	0
Vitek Vanecek	2	2	99:49	1	1	7	4.21	51	.863	0	0	0	2

^{†}Denotes player spent time with another team before joining the Capitals. Stats reflect time with the Capitals only.
^{‡}Denotes player was traded mid-season. Stats reflect time with the Capitals only.
Bold/italics denotes franchise record.

== Transactions ==
The Capitals have been involved in the following transactions during the 2021–22 season.

=== Trades ===
Date	Details		Ref
July 24, 2021	To New York Rangers ARI 3rd-round pick in 2021	To Washington Capitals 3rd-round pick in 2021; 6th-round pick in 2021	
July 26, 2021	To Winnipeg Jets Brenden Dillon	To Washington Capitals 2nd-round pick in 2022; 2nd-round pick in 2023	
July 28, 2021	To Seattle Kraken WPG 2nd-round pick in 2023	To Washington Capitals Vitek Vanecek	
March 21, 2022	To Seattle Kraken Daniel Sprong; 4th-round pick in 2022; 6th-round pick in 2022	To Washington Capitals Marcus Johansson	
March 21, 2022	To Arizona Coyotes 3rd-round pick in 2023	To Washington Capitals Johan Larsson	

Notes:

- ^{[a]} Arizona will receive a third-round pick in 2024 if Colorado wins the 2022 Stanley Cup and Kuemper in 50% of their playoff games; otherwise no pick will be exchanged.

=== Players acquired ===
Date	Player	Former team	Term	Via	Ref
July 28, 2021	Matt Irwin	Buffalo Sabres	1-year	Free agency	
July 28, 2021	Dylan McIlrath	Detroit Red Wings	2-year	Free agency	
July 28, 2021	Hunter Shepard	Grand Rapids Griffins (AHL)	2-year	Free agency	
August 5, 2021	Mike Vecchione	Colorado Avalanche	1-year	Free agency	
October 11, 2021	Axel Jonsson-Fjallby	Buffalo Sabres		Waivers	
October 14, 2021	Dennis Cholowski	Seattle Kraken		Waivers	
March 1, 2022	Henrik Rybinski	Seattle Thunderbirds (WHL)	3-year	Free agency	
March 28, 2022	Clay Stevenson	Dartmouth Big Green (ECAC)	2-year	Free agency	

=== Players lost ===
Date	Player	New team	Term	Via	Ref
July 21, 2021	Vitek Vanecek	Seattle Kraken		Expansion draft	
July 28, 2021	Craig Anderson	Buffalo Sabres	1-year	Free agency	
July 28, 2021	Michael Raffl	Dallas Stars	1-year	Free agency	
August 20, 2021	Henrik Lundqvist			Retirement	
October 4, 2021	Axel Jonsson-Fjallby	Buffalo Sabres		Waivers	
October 14, 2021	Cameron Schilling	Abbotsford Canucks (AHL)	1-year	Free agency	
February 9, 2022	Dennis Cholowski	Seattle Kraken		Waivers	
June 15, 2022	Tobias Geisser	EV Zug (NL)	3-year	Free agency	

=== Signings ===
Date	Player	Term	Contract type	Ref
July 8, 2021	Beck Malenstyn	1-year	Re-signing	
July 27, 2021	Alexander Ovechkin	5-year	Re-signing	
July 28, 2021	Lucas Johansen	1-year	Re-signing	
August 9, 2021	Ilya Samsonov	1-year	Re-signing	
October 4, 2021	Vincent Iorio	3-year	Entry-level	
November 14, 2021	Nic Dowd	3-year	Extension	
March 16, 2022	Joe Snively	2-year	Extension	
March 28, 2022	Mike Vecchione	1-year	Extension	
April 29, 2022	Garin Bjorklund	3-year	Entry-level	
May 2, 2022	Bogdan Trineyev	3-year	Entry-level	
June 25, 2022	Brett Leason	2-year	Extension	
June 25, 2022	Beck Malenstyn	2-year	Extension	

== Draft picks ==
Below are the Washington Capitals' selections at the 2021 NHL entry draft, which were held on July 23 to 24, 2021. It was held virtually via Video conference call from the NHL Network studio in Secaucus, New Jersey.

Round	#	Player	Pos.	Nationality	Team (League)
2	55	Vincent Iorio	D	Canada	Brandon Wheat Kings (WHL)
3	80	Brent Johnson	D	USA	Sioux Falls Stampede (USHL)
4	119	Joaquin Lemay	D	Canada	Salmon Arm Silverbacks (BCHL)
5	151	Haakon Hanelt	F/D	Germany	Eisbaren Berlin (DEL)
6	176	Dru Krebs	D	Canada	Medicine Hat Tigers (WHL)
6	183	Chase Clark	G	USA	Jersey Hitmen (USPHL)
