= 2021–22 Calgary Flames season =

National Hockey League season

2021–22 Calgary Flames
- Pacific Division champions
- Division: 1st Pacific
- Conference: 3rd Western
- 2021–22 record: 50–21–11
- Home record: 25–9–7
- Road record: 25–12–4
- Goals for: 293
- Goals against: 208

Team information
- General manager: Brad Treliving
- Coach: Darryl Sutter
- Captain: Vacant
- Alternate captains: Mikael Backlund; Sean Monahan; Christopher Tanev; Matthew Tkachuk
- Arena: Scotiabank Saddledome
- Average attendance: 14,284
- Minor league affiliates: Stockton Heat (AHL); Kansas City Mavericks (ECHL)

Team leaders
- Goals: Elias Lindholm and Matthew Tkachuk (42)
- Assists: Johnny Gaudreau (75)
- Points: Johnny Gaudreau (115)
- Penalty minutes: Milan Lucic (84)
- Plus/minus: Johnny Gaudreau (+64)
- Wins: Jacob Markstrom (37)
- Goals against average: Jacob Markstrom (2.22)

The 2021–22 Calgary Flames season was the Flames' 42nd season in Calgary, and the 50th season for the Flames' National Hockey League franchise that was established on June 6, 1972. On April 16, 2022, the Flames clinched a playoff berth after the Edmonton Oilers defeated the Vegas Golden Knights. On April 21, the Flames clinched the Pacific Division after a 4–2 victory over the Dallas Stars.

The Flames beat the Stars in seven games in the First Round of the playoffs. The following round, they were defeated by the Edmonton Oilers in five games. The series was only the second time two Canadian teams had met in the second round of the playoffs since 2002, and the first such matchup since then to have occurred under conventional division alignment.

== Standings ==
=== Divisional standings ===
Pacific Division
Pos	Team	GP	W	L	OTL	RW	GF	GA	GD	Pts
1	y – Calgary Flames	82	50	21	11	44	293	208	+85	111
2	x – Edmonton Oilers	82	49	27	6	38	290	252	+38	104
3	x – Los Angeles Kings	82	44	27	11	35	239	236	+3	99
4	Vegas Golden Knights	82	43	31	8	34	266	248	+18	94
5	Vancouver Canucks	82	40	30	12	32	249	236	+13	92
6	San Jose Sharks	82	32	37	13	22	214	264	−50	77
7	Anaheim Ducks	82	31	37	14	22	232	271	−39	76
8	Seattle Kraken	82	27	49	6	23	216	285	−69	60

Source: National Hockey League
Rules for classification: 1) Fewer number of games played (GP, only during regular season); 2) Greater number of regulation wins (RW); 3) Greater number of wins in regulation and overtime, excluding shootout wins (ROW); 4) Greater number of total wins, including shootouts (W); 5) Greater number of points earned in head-to-head play; if teams played an uneven number of head-to-head games, the result of the first game on the home ice of the team with the extra home game is discarded; 6) Greater goal differential (GD); 7) Greater number of goals scored (GF)
x – Clinched playoff spot; y – Clinched division

=== Wild Card standings ===
Western Conference Wild Card
Pos	Div	Team	GP	W	L	OTL	RW	GF	GA	GD	Pts
1	CE	x – Dallas Stars	82	46	30	6	31	238	246	−8	98
2	CE	x – Nashville Predators	82	45	30	7	35	266	252	+14	97
3	PA	Vegas Golden Knights	82	43	31	8	34	266	248	+18	94
4	PA	Vancouver Canucks	82	40	30	12	32	249	236	+13	92
5	CE	Winnipeg Jets	82	39	32	11	32	252	257	−5	89
6	PA	San Jose Sharks	82	32	37	13	22	214	264	−50	77
7	PA	Anaheim Ducks	82	31	37	14	22	232	271	−39	76
8	CE	Chicago Blackhawks	82	28	42	12	16	219	291	−72	68
9	PA	Seattle Kraken	82	27	49	6	23	216	285	−69	60
10	CE	Arizona Coyotes	82	25	50	7	18	207	313	−106	57

Source: National Hockey League
Rules for classification: 1) Fewer number of games played (GP, only during regular season); 2) Greater number of regulation wins (RW); 3) Greater number of wins in regulation and overtime, excluding shootout wins (ROW); 4) Greater number of total wins, including shootouts (W); 5) Greater number of points earned in head-to-head play; if teams played an uneven number of head-to-head games, the result of the first game on the home ice of the team with the extra home game is discarded; 6) Greater goal differential (GD); 7) Greater number of goals scored (GF)
x – Clinched playoff spot

== Schedule and results ==
=== Preseason ===
2021 preseason game log: 3–4–1 (home: 2–1–1; road: 1–3–0)
#	Date	Visitor	Score	Home	OT	Decision	Attendance	Record	Recap
1	September 26	Edmonton	4–0	Calgary		Vladar	14,519	0–1–0
2^{[a]}	September 27	Calgary	2–4	Vancouver		Werner		0–2–0
3	September 29	Seattle	4–3	Calgary	SO	Vladar	14,451	0–2–1
4	October 1	Vancouver	1–4	Calgary		Markstrom	14,722	1–2–1
5^{[b]}	October 2	Calgary	4–1	Seattle		Vladar		2–2–1
6	October 4	Calgary	3–4	Edmonton		Markstrom	13,566	2–3–1
7	October 6	Calgary	2–3	Winnipeg		Vladar		2–4–1
8	October 8	Winnipeg	2–3	Calgary		Markstrom	14,065	3–4–1
Notes:^{a} Game was played at Abbotsford Centre in Abbotsford, British Columbia ^{b} Game was played at accesso ShoWare Center in Kent, Washington

=== Regular season ===
2021–22 game log

October: 6–1–1 (home: 1–0–1; road: 5–1–0)
#	Date	Visitor	Score	Home	OT	Decision	Attendance	Record	Pts	Recap
1	October 16	Calgary	2–5	Edmonton		Markstrom	17,745	0–1–0	0
2	October 18	Anaheim	3–2	Calgary	OT	Markstrom	15,174	0–1–1	1
3	October 21	Calgary	3–0	Detroit		Markstrom	14,241	1–1–1	3
4	October 23	Calgary	4–3	Washington	OT	Vladar	18,573	2–1–1	5
5	October 25	Calgary	5–1	NY Rangers		Markstrom	13,590	3–1–1	7
6	October 26	Calgary	5–3	New Jersey		Vladar	10,631	4–1–1	9
7	October 28	Calgary	4–0	Pittsburgh		Markstrom	17,743	5–1–1	11
8	October 30	Philadelphia	0–4	Calgary		Markstrom	15,319	6–1–1	13

November: 7–3–4 (home: 3–2–2; road: 4–1–2)
#	Date	Visitor	Score	Home	OT	Decision	Attendance	Record	Pts	Recap
9	November 2	Nashville	3–2	Calgary	OT	Markstrom	14,324	6–1–2	14
10	November 4	Dallas	4–3	Calgary	OT	Markstrom	14,715	6–1–3	15
11	November 6	NY Rangers	0–6	Calgary		Markstrom	15,879	7–1–3	17
12	November 9	San Jose	4–1	Calgary		Markstrom	14,960	7–2–3	17
13	November 11	Calgary	2–4	Montreal		Markstrom	20,399	7–3–3	17
14	November 12	Calgary	1–2	Toronto	OT	Vladar	18,826	7–3–4	18
15	November 14	Calgary	4–0	Ottawa		Vladar	10,244	8–3–4	20
16	November 16	Calgary	1–2	Philadelphia	OT	Markstrom	16,278	8–3–5	21
17	November 18	Calgary	5–0	Buffalo		Markstrom	7,753	9–3–5	23
18	November 20	Calgary	5–2	NY Islanders		Markstrom	17,255	10–3–5	25
19	November 21	Calgary	4–0	Boston		Vladar	17,850	11–3–5	27
20	November 23	Chicago	2–5	Calgary		Markstrom	15,464	12–3–5	29
21	November 27	Winnipeg	4–2	Calgary		Markstrom	17,036	12–4–5	29
22	November 29	Pittsburgh	1–2	Calgary	SO	Markstrom	15,343	13–4–5	31

December: 3–3–1 (home: 0–1–1; road: 3–2–0)
#	Date	Visitor	Score	Home	OT	Decision	Attendance	Record	Pts	Recap
23	December 2	Calgary	3–2	Los Angeles		Markstrom	13,241	14–4–5	33
24	December 3	Calgary	4–3	Anaheim	SO	Vladar	12,427	15–4–5	35
25	December 5	Calgary	2–3	Vegas		Markstrom	18,077	15–5–5	35
26	December 7	Calgary	3–5	San Jose		Vladar	10,534	15–6–5	35
27	December 9	Carolina	2–1	Calgary	OT	Markstrom	15,620	15–6–6	36
28	December 11	Boston	4–2	Calgary		Markstrom	16,190	15–7–6	36
—	December 13	Calgary	–	Chicago	Postponed due to COVID-19. Makeup date April 18.
—	December 14	Calgary	–	Nashville	Postponed due to COVID-19. Makeup date April 19.
—	December 16	Toronto	–	Calgary	Postponed due to COVID-19. Makeup date February 10.
—	December 18	Columbus	–	Calgary	Postponed due to COVID-19. Makeup date February 15.
—	December 21	Anaheim	–	Calgary	Postponed due to COVID-19. Makeup date February 16.
—	December 23	Seattle	–	Calgary	Postponed due to COVID-19. Makeup date February 19.
—	December 27	Edmonton	–	Calgary	Postponed due to COVID-19. Makeup date March 7.
29	December 30	Calgary	6–4	Seattle		Markstrom	17,151	16–7–6	38
—	December 31	Winnipeg	–	Calgary	Postponed due to attendance restrictions. Makeup date February 21.

January: 5–6–0 (home: 3–1–0; road: 2–5–0)
#	Date	Visitor	Score	Home	OT	Decision	Attendance	Record	Pts	Recap
30	January 2	Calgary	5–1	Chicago		Markstrom	17,454	17–7–6	40
31	January 4	Calgary	2–6	Florida		Markstrom	13,164	17–8–6	40
32	January 6	Calgary	1–4	Tampa Bay		Vladar	19,092	17–9–6	40
33	January 7	Calgary	3–6	Carolina		Vladar	16,281	17–10–6	40
—	January 11	NY Islanders	–	Calgary	Postponed due to COVID-19. Makeup date February 12.
34	January 13	Ottawa	4–1	Calgary		Markstrom	9,639	17–11–6	40
—	January 15	Vegas	–	Calgary	Postponed due to COVID-19. Makeup date February 9.
35	January 18	Florida	1–5	Calgary		Markstrom	9,639	18–11–6	42
36	January 22	Calgary	3–5	Edmonton		Markstrom	9,150	18–12–6	42
37	January 24	St. Louis	1–7	Calgary		Markstrom	9,039	19–12–6	44
38	January 26	Calgary	6–0	Columbus		Markstrom	13,737	20–12–6	46
39	January 27	Calgary	1–5	St. Louis		Markstrom	18,096	20–13–6	46
40	January 29	Vancouver	0–1	Calgary	OT	Markstrom	9,639	21–13–6	48

February: 10–1–0 (home: 8–0–0; road: 2–1–0)
#	Date	Visitor	Score	Home	OT	Decision	Attendance	Record	Pts	Recap
41	February 1	Calgary	4–3	Dallas		Vladar	17,567	22–13–6	50
42	February 2	Calgary	4–2	Arizona		Markstrom	9,552	23–13–6	52
43	February 9	Vegas	0–6	Calgary		Markstrom	9,639	24–13–6	54
44	February 10	Toronto	2–5	Calgary		Markstrom	9,639	25–13–6	56
45	February 12	NY Islanders	2–5	Calgary		Markstrom	9,639	26–13–6	58
46	February 15	Columbus	2–6	Calgary		Vladar	9,639	27–13–6	60
47	February 16	Anaheim	2–6	Calgary		Markstrom	9,639	28–13–6	62
48	February 19	Seattle	1–2	Calgary		Markstrom	9,639	29–13–6	64
49	February 21	Winnipeg	1–3	Calgary		Markstrom	9,639	30–13–6	66
50	February 24	Calgary	1–7	Vancouver		Markstrom	18,857	30–14–6	66
51	February 26	Minnesota	3–7	Calgary		Markstrom	9,639	31–14–6	68

March: 9–4–3 (home: 5–3–3; road: 4–1–0)
#	Date	Visitor	Score	Home	OT	Decision	Attendance	Record	Pts	Recap
52	March 1	Calgary	5–1	Minnesota		Markstrom	16,998	32–14–6	70
53	March 3	Montreal	5–4	Calgary	OT	Markstrom	16,288	32–14–7	71
54	March 5	Calgary	4–3	Colorado	OT	Vladar	18,087	33–14–7	73
55	March 7	Edmonton	1–3	Calgary		Markstrom	17,246	34–14–7	75
56	March 8	Washington	5–4	Calgary		Vladar	15,628	34–15–7	75
57	March 10	Tampa Bay	1–4	Calgary		Markstrom	15,689	35–15–7	77
58	March 12	Detroit	0–3	Calgary		Markstrom	17,658	36–15–7	79
59	March 13	Calgary	0–3	Colorado		Vladar	18,081	36–16–7	79
60	March 16	New Jersey	3–6	Calgary		Markstrom	15,488	37–16–7	81
61	March 18	Buffalo	1–0	Calgary	OT	Markstrom	16,685	37–16–8	82
62	March 19	Calgary	5–2	Vancouver		Vladar	18,865	38–16–8	84
63	March 22	San Jose	4–3	Calgary		Markstrom	15,594	38–17–8	84
64	March 25	Arizona	2–4	Calgary		Markstrom	16,526	39–17–8	86
65	March 26	Edmonton	5–9	Calgary		Markstrom	19,289	40–17–8	88
66	March 29	Colorado	2–1	Calgary		Markstrom	16,543	40–18–8	88
67	March 31	Los Angeles	3–2	Calgary	SO	Markstrom	16,398	40–18–9	89

April 10–3–2 (home: 4–2–0; road: 6–1–2)
#	Date	Visitor	Score	Home	OT	Decision	Attendance	Record	Pts	Recap
68	April 2	St. Louis	6–4	Calgary		Markstrom	16,422	40–19–9	89
69	April 4	Calgary	3–2	Los Angeles		Markstrom	13,464	41–19–9	91
70	April 6	Calgary	4–2	Anaheim		Markstrom	13,417	42–19–9	93
71	April 7	Calgary	4–2	San Jose		Vladar	11,426	43–19–9	95
72	April 9	Calgary	4–1	Seattle		Markstrom	17,151	44–19–9	97
73	April 12	Seattle	3–5	Calgary		Vladar	16,392	45–19–9	99
74	April 14	Vegas	6–1	Calgary		Markstrom	17,070	45–20–9	99
75	April 16	Arizona	1–9	Calgary		Markstrom	16,823	46–20–9	101
76	April 18	Calgary	5–2	Chicago		Markstrom	18,523	47–20–9	103
77	April 19	Calgary	2–3	Nashville	SO	Vladar	17,237	47–20–10	104
78	April 21	Dallas	2–4	Calgary		Markstrom	17,280	48–20–10	106
79	April 23	Vancouver	3–6	Calgary		Vladar	17,533	49–20–10	108
80	April 26	Calgary	5–4	Nashville	OT	Vladar	17,498	50–20–10	110
81	April 28	Calgary	2–3	Minnesota	OT	Markstrom	18,490	50–20–11	111
82	April 29	Calgary	1–3	Winnipeg		Vladar	14,202	50–21–11	111

Legend: Win (2 points) Loss (0 points) Overtime/shootout loss (1 point)

=== Playoffs ===
2022 Stanley Cup playoffs

Western Conference First Round vs. (WC1) Dallas Stars: Calgary won 4–3
#	Date	Visitor	Score	Home	OT	Decision	Attendance	Series	Recap
1	May 3	Dallas	0–1	Calgary		Markstrom	19,289	0–1
2	May 5	Dallas	2–0	Calgary		Markstrom	19,289	1–1
3	May 7	Calgary	2–4	Dallas		Markstrom	18,532	1–2
4	May 9	Calgary	4–1	Dallas		Markstrom	18,532	2–2
5	May 11	Dallas	1–3	Calgary		Markstrom	19,289	3–2
6	May 13	Calgary	2–4	Dallas		Markstrom	18,532	3–3
7	May 15	Dallas	2–3	Calgary	OT	Markstrom	19,289	4–3

Western Conference Second Round vs. (P2) Edmonton Oilers: Edmonton won 4–1
#	Date	Visitor	Score	Home	OT	Decision	Attendance	Series	Recap
1	May 18	Edmonton	6–9	Calgary		Markstrom	19,289	1–0
2	May 20	Edmonton	5–3	Calgary		Markstrom	19,289	1–1
3	May 22	Calgary	1–4	Edmonton		Markstrom	18,347	1–2
4	May 24	Calgary	3–5	Edmonton		Markstrom	18,347	1–3
5	May 26	Edmonton	5–4	Calgary	OT	Markstrom	19,289	1–4

Legend: Win Loss

== Player statistics ==
=== Skaters ===
Regular season
Player	GP	G	A	Pts	+/−	PIM
Johnny Gaudreau	82	40	75	115	+64	26
Matthew Tkachuk	82	42	62	104	+57	68
Elias Lindholm	82	42	40	82	+61	22
Andrew Mangiapane	82	35	20	55	+20	38
Rasmus Andersson	82	4	46	50	+30	28
Noah Hanifin	81	10	38	48	+27	19
Mikael Backlund	82	12	27	39	+16	30
Blake Coleman	81	16	17	33	+16	60
Dillon Dube	79	18	14	32	+1	20
Oliver Kylington	73	9	22	31	+34	14
Christopher Tanev	82	6	22	28	+35	22
Tyler Toffoli^{†}	37	11	12	23	+3	10
Sean Monahan	65	8	15	23	−15	24
Nikita Zadorov	74	4	18	22	+11	77
Milan Lucic	82	10	11	21	−9	84
Erik Gudbranson	78	6	11	17	+15	68
Trevor Lewis	80	6	10	16	−1	12
Adam Ruzicka	28	5	5	10	+8	8
Michael Stone	11	2	4	6	+3	4
Brett Ritchie	41	3	1	4	−6	29
Brad Richardson	27	2	2	4	−2	27
Calle Jarnkrok^{†}	17	0	4	4	+1	4
Tyler Pitlick^{‡}	25	0	2	2	−5	2
Juuso Valimaki	9	0	2	2	0	10
Ryan Carpenter	8	0	1	1	−1	0
Connor Mackey	3	0	1	1	−1	2
Walker Duehr	1	0	0	0	0	0
Glenn Gawdin	2	0	0	0	0	2

Playoffs
Player	GP	G	A	Pts	+/−	PIM
Johnny Gaudreau	12	3	11	14	−3	2
Matthew Tkachuk	12	4	6	10	−6	20
Elias Lindholm	12	5	4	9	−7	6
Mikael Backlund	12	5	3	8	+6	8
Rasmus Andersson	12	3	3	6	−10	23
Andrew Mangiapane	12	3	3	6	+4	10
Blake Coleman	12	2	3	5	+5	12
Tyler Toffoli	12	2	3	5	−6	6
Michael Stone	9	2	3	5	+6	4
Trevor Lewis	12	2	3	5	−1	14
Calle Jarnkrok	12	1	3	4	−1	0
Oliver Kylington	12	1	2	3	+5	8
Noah Hanifin	12	0	3	3	−11	4
Nikita Zadorov	12	0	3	3	+2	24
Brett Ritchie	7	2	0	2	−1	4
Dillon Dube	12	0	1	1	−2	2
Erik Gudbranson	12	0	1	1	−1	0
Christopher Tanev	8	0	1	1	+3	2
Milan Lucic	12	0	1	1	−3	33

=== Goaltenders ===
Regular season
Player	GP	GS	TOI	W	L	OT	GA	GAA	SA	SV%	SO	G	A	PIM
Jacob Markstrom	63	63	3,695:50	37	15	9	137	2.22	1,754	.922	9	0	3	10
Daniel Vladar	23	19	1,243:08	13	6	2	57	2.75	608	.906	2	0	1	0

Playoffs
Player	GP	GS	TOI	W	L	GA	GAA	SA	SV%	SO	G	A	PIM
Jacob Markstrom	12	12	712:27	5	7	35	2.95	354	.901	1	0	1	0
Daniel Vladar	1	0	19:56	0	0	0	0.00	7	1.000	0	0	0	0

^{†}Denotes player spent time with another team before joining the Flames. Stats reflect time with the Flames only.
^{‡}Denotes player was traded mid-season. Stats reflect time with the Flames only.
Bold/italics denotes franchise record.

== Transactions ==
The Flames have been involved in the following transactions during the 2021–22 season.

=== Trades ===
Date	Details		Ref
July 22, 2021	To Seattle Kraken 4th-round pick in 2022	To Calgary Flames Tyler Pitlick	
July 24, 2021	To Los Angeles Kings EDM 3rd-round pick in 2021	To Calgary Flames TOR 3rd-round pick in 2021; 6th-round pick in 2021	
July 28, 2021	To Chicago Blackhawks TOR 3rd-round pick in 2022	To Calgary Flames Nikita Zadorov	
July 28, 2021	To Boston Bruins 3rd-round pick in 2022	To Calgary Flames Daniel Vladar	
February 14, 2022	To Montreal Canadiens Tyler Pitlick; Emil Heineman; Conditional 1st-round pick in 2022; 5th-round pick in 2022	To Calgary Flames Tyler Toffoli	
March 2, 2022	To Montreal Canadiens Future considerations	To Calgary Flames Michael McNiven	
March 16, 2022	To Seattle Kraken FLA 2nd-round pick in 2022; 3rd-round pick in 2023; 7th-round pick in 2024	To Calgary Flames Calle Jarnkrok	
March 21, 2022	To Chicago Blackhawks 5th-round pick in 2024	To Calgary Flames Ryan Carpenter	
March 21, 2022	To Ottawa Senators Michael McNiven	To Calgary Flames Future considerations	

=== Players acquired ===
Date	Player	Former team	Term	Via	Ref
July 28, 2021	Blake Coleman	Tampa Bay Lightning	6-year	Free agency	
July 28, 2021	Nick DeSimone	New York Rangers	1-year	Free agency	
July 28, 2021	Kevin Gravel	Bakersfield Condors (AHL)	1-year	Free agency	
July 28, 2021	Trevor Lewis	Winnipeg Jets	1-year	Free agency	
July 28, 2021	Adam Werner	Colorado Avalanche	1-year	Free agency	
July 29, 2021	Andy Welinski	Anaheim Ducks	1-year	Free agency	
September 8, 2021	Brad Richardson	Nashville Predators	1-year	Free agency	
September 10, 2021	Erik Gudbranson	Nashville Predators	1-year	Free agency	
May 16, 2022	Adam Klapka	Bili Tygri Liberec (ELH)	2-year	Free agency	

=== Players lost ===
Date	Player	New team	Term	Via	Ref
July 21, 2021	Mark Giordano	Seattle Kraken		Expansion draft	
July 28, 2021	Josh Leivo	Carolina Hurricanes	1-year	Free agency	
July 28, 2021	Alex Petrovic	Dallas Stars	1-year	Free agency	
July 28, 2021	Derek Ryan	Edmonton Oilers	2-year	Free agency	
July 28, 2021	Dominik Simon	Pittsburgh Penguins	2-year	Free agency	
July 29, 2021	Buddy Robinson	Anaheim Ducks	1-year	Free agency	
August 13, 2021	Zac Rinaldo	Columbus Blue Jackets	1-year	Free agency	
September 2, 2021	Louis Domingue	Pittsburgh Penguins	1-year	Free agency	
March 21, 2022	Brad Richardson	Vancouver Canucks		Waivers	
May 27, 2022	Dmitry Zavgorodniy			Contract termination	
June 10, 2022	Dmitry Zavgorodniy	HC Sochi (KHL)	2-year	Free agency	
June 20, 2022	Johannes Kinnvall	Brynäs IF (SHL)	2-year	Free agency	
June 20, 2022	Adam Werner	Malmö Redhawks (SHL)	2-year	Free agency	
June 23, 2022	Eetu Tuulola	Ilves (Liiga)	1-year	Free agency	

=== Signings ===
Date	Player	Term	Contract type	Ref
July 15, 2021	Brett Ritchie	1-year	Re-signing	
July 31, 2021	Colton Poolman	1-year	Re-signing	
August 6, 2021	Matthew Phillips	1-year	Re-signing	
August 6, 2021	Luke Philp	1-year	Re-signing	
August 9, 2021	Oliver Kylington	1-year	Re-signing	
August 16, 2021	Tyler Parsons	1-year	Re-signing	
August 20, 2021	Nikita Zadorov	1-year	Re-signing	
August 20, 2021	Juuso Valimaki	2-year	Re-signing	
August 25, 2021	Glenn Gawdin	1-year	Re-signing	
August 25, 2021	Justin Kirkland	1-year	Re-signing	
August 26, 2021	Dillon Dube	3-year	Re-signing	
September 8, 2021	Connor Mackey	2-year	Re-signing	
September 10, 2021	Michael Stone	1-year	Re-signing	
September 24, 2021	Jeremie Poirier	3-year	Entry-level	
March 1, 2022	Rory Kerins	3-year	Entry-level	
May 21, 2022	Ilya Nikolaev	3-year	Entry-level	

== Draft picks ==
Below are the Calgary Flames' selections at the 2021 NHL entry draft, which were held on July 23 to 24, 2021. It was held virtually via Video conference call from the NHL Network studio in Secaucus, New Jersey.

Round	#	Player	Pos.	Nationality	Team (League)
1	13	Matthew Coronato	RW	USA	Chicago Steel (USHL)
2	45	William Stromgren	LW	Sweden	MoDo (HockeyAllsvenskan)
3	77	Cole Huckins	C	Canada	Acadie–Bathurst Titan (QMJHL)
3	89	Cameron Whynot	D	Canada	Halifax Mooseheads (QMJHL)
5	141	Cole Jordan	D	Canada	Moose Jaw Warriors (WHL)
6	168	Jack Beck	RW	Canada	Ottawa 67's (OHL)
6	173	Lucas Ciona	LW	Canada	Seattle Thunderbirds (WHL)
7	205	Arsenii Sergeev	G	Russia	Shreveport Mudbugs (NAHL)
