= 2021–22 Los Angeles Kings season =

National Hockey League season

2021–22 Los Angeles Kings
- Division: 3rd Pacific
- Conference: 6th Western
- 2021–22 record: 44–27–11
- Home record: 21–16–4
- Road record: 23–11–7
- Goals for: 239
- Goals against: 236

Team information
- General manager: Rob Blake
- Coach: Todd McLellan
- Captain: Anze Kopitar
- Alternate captains: Dustin Brown; Phillip Danault (Mar.–Apr.); Drew Doughty; Alex Iafallo (Oct.–Nov./Mar.–Apr.)
- Arena: Staples Center/Crypto.com Arena
- Average attendance: 14,828
- Minor league affiliate: Ontario Reign (AHL)

Team leaders
- Goals: Adrian Kempe (35)
- Assists: Anze Kopitar (48)
- Points: Anze Kopitar (67)
- Penalty minutes: Brendan Lemieux (97)
- Plus/minus: Matt Roy (+23)
- Wins: Jonathan Quick (23)
- Goals against average: Garret Sparks (1.85)

The 2021–22 Los Angeles Kings season was the 55th season (54th season of play) for the National Hockey League (NHL) franchise that was established on June 5, 1967. On April 26, 2022, the Kings clinched a playoff berth for the first time since 2018 after the Dallas Stars defeated the Vegas Golden Knights in a shootout. They were defeated in the first round of the playoffs by the Edmonton Oilers, in seven games.

During the season, the Kings' home arena Staples Center changed its name to Crypto.com Arena, effective December 25, 2021, as part of a new naming rights agreement. This season marked Dustin Brown's last, as he announced on April 28, 2022 his intention to retire following the playoffs. In addition, it is also the last full season that longtime goaltender Conn Smythe Trophy winner Jonathan Quick, who was traded on March 1, 2023, to the Columbus Blue Jackets and then to the Vegas Golden Knights the following day.

== Standings ==
=== Divisional standings ===
Pacific Division
Pos	Team	GP	W	L	OTL	RW	GF	GA	GD	Pts
1	y – Calgary Flames	82	50	21	11	44	293	208	+85	111
2	x – Edmonton Oilers	82	49	27	6	38	290	252	+38	104
3	x – Los Angeles Kings	82	44	27	11	35	239	236	+3	99
4	Vegas Golden Knights	82	43	31	8	34	266	248	+18	94
5	Vancouver Canucks	82	40	30	12	32	249	236	+13	92
6	San Jose Sharks	82	32	37	13	22	214	264	−50	77
7	Anaheim Ducks	82	31	37	14	22	232	271	−39	76
8	Seattle Kraken	82	27	49	6	23	216	285	−69	60

Source: National Hockey League
Rules for classification: 1) Fewer number of games played (GP, only during regular season); 2) Greater number of regulation wins (RW); 3) Greater number of wins in regulation and overtime, excluding shootout wins (ROW); 4) Greater number of total wins, including shootouts (W); 5) Greater number of points earned in head-to-head play; if teams played an uneven number of head-to-head games, the result of the first game on the home ice of the team with the extra home game is discarded; 6) Greater goal differential (GD); 7) Greater number of goals scored (GF)
x – Clinched playoff spot; y – Clinched division

=== Western Conference ===
Western Conference Wild Card
Pos	Div	Team	GP	W	L	OTL	RW	GF	GA	GD	Pts
1	CE	x – Dallas Stars	82	46	30	6	31	238	246	−8	98
2	CE	x – Nashville Predators	82	45	30	7	35	266	252	+14	97
3	PA	Vegas Golden Knights	82	43	31	8	34	266	248	+18	94
4	PA	Vancouver Canucks	82	40	30	12	32	249	236	+13	92
5	CE	Winnipeg Jets	82	39	32	11	32	252	257	−5	89
6	PA	San Jose Sharks	82	32	37	13	22	214	264	−50	77
7	PA	Anaheim Ducks	82	31	37	14	22	232	271	−39	76
8	CE	Chicago Blackhawks	82	28	42	12	16	219	291	−72	68
9	PA	Seattle Kraken	82	27	49	6	23	216	285	−69	60
10	CE	Arizona Coyotes	82	25	50	7	18	207	313	−106	57

Source: National Hockey League
Rules for classification: 1) Fewer number of games played (GP, only during regular season); 2) Greater number of regulation wins (RW); 3) Greater number of wins in regulation and overtime, excluding shootout wins (ROW); 4) Greater number of total wins, including shootouts (W); 5) Greater number of points earned in head-to-head play; if teams played an uneven number of head-to-head games, the result of the first game on the home ice of the team with the extra home game is discarded; 6) Greater goal differential (GD); 7) Greater number of goals scored (GF)
x – Clinched playoff spot

== Schedule and results ==
=== Preseason ===
2021 preseason: 3–3–1 (home: 1–0–1; road: 2–3–0)

Game	Date	Opponent	Score	OT	Decision	Location	Attendance	Record	Recap
1	September 27	@ Arizona Coyotes	1–2		Villalta	Gila River Arena	7,532	0–1–0	
2	September 28	@ San Jose Sharks	4–3		Sparks	SAP Center	6,837	1–1–0	
3	September 30	Vegas Golden Knights	3–1		Sparks	Vivint Arena		2–1–0	
4	October 1	@ Vegas Golden Knights	0–4		Petersen	T-Mobile Arena	17,542	2–2–0	
5	October 5	Arizona Coyotes	1–4		Quick	Staples Center	7,206	2–3–0	
6	October 6	@ Anaheim Ducks	6–3		Petersen	Honda Center		3–3–0	
7	October 9	Anaheim Ducks	3–4	OT	Quick	Staples Center	12,132	3–3–1	

=== Regular season ===
2021–22 game log
October: 3–5–1 (home: 3–2–0; road: 0–3–1)

Game	Date	Opponent	Score	OT	Decision	Location	Attendance	Record	Points	Recap
1	October 14	Vegas Golden Knights	6–2		Petersen	Staples Center	16,589	1–0–0	2	
2	October 16	Minnesota Wild	2–3		Quick	Staples Center	12,590	1–1–0	2	
3	October 19	@ Nashville Predators	1–2		Petersen	Bridgestone Arena	17,159	1–2–0	2	
4	October 22	@ Dallas Stars	2–3	OT	Quick	American Airlines Center	18,532	1–2–1	3	
5	October 23	@ St. Louis Blues	3–7		Petersen	Enterprise Center	18,096	1–3–1	3	
6	October 25	@ St. Louis Blues	0–3		Quick	Enterprise Center	16,655	1–4–1	3	
7	October 28	Winnipeg Jets	2–3		Quick	Staples Center	11,207	1–5–1	3	
8	October 30	Montreal Canadiens	5–2		Petersen	Staples Center	12,785	2–5–1	5	
9	October 31	Buffalo Sabres	3–2		Quick	Staples Center	12,101	3–5–1	7	

November: 6–3–3 (home: 3–3–2; road: 3–0–1)

Game	Date	Opponent	Score	OT	Decision	Location	Attendance	Record	Points	Recap
10	November 3	St. Louis Blues	3–2	SO	Quick	Staples Center	11,756	4–5–1	9	
11	November 5	New Jersey Devils	3–2	OT	Petersen	Staples Center	16,045	5–5–1	11	
12	November 8	@ Toronto Maple Leafs	5–1		Quick	Scotiabank Arena	18,983	6–5–1	13	
13	November 9	@ Montreal Canadiens	3–2	OT	Petersen	Bell Centre	20,042	7–5–1	15	
14	November 11	@ Ottawa Senators	2–0		Quick	Canadian Tire Centre	8,221	8–5–1	17	
15	November 13	@ Winnipeg Jets	2–3	OT	Petersen	Canada Life Centre	13,776	8–5–2	18	
16	November 17	Washington Capitals	0–2		Quick	Staples Center	14,694	8–6–2	18	
17	November 20	Carolina Hurricanes	4–5		Petersen	Staples Center	15,744	8–7–2	18	
18	November 21	Arizona Coyotes	1–2	OT	Quick	Staples Center	13,474	8–7–3	19	
19	November 24	Toronto Maple Leafs	2–6		Quick	Staples Center	15,166	8–8–3	19	
20	November 27	Ottawa Senators	4–2		Petersen	Staples Center	15,406	9–8–3	21	
21	November 30	Anaheim Ducks	4–5	SO	Quick	Staples Center	15,276	9–8–4	22	

December: 6–4–1 (home: 3–2–0; road: 3–2–1)

Game	Date	Opponent	Score	OT	Decision	Location	Attendance	Record	Points	Recap
22	December 2	Calgary Flames	2–3		Petersen	Staples Center	13,241	9–9–4	22	
23	December 5	@ Edmonton Oilers	5–1		Quick	Rogers Place	15,658	10–9–4	24	
24	December 6	@ Vancouver Canucks	0–4		Petersen	Rogers Arena	18,591	10–10–4	24	
25	December 9	Dallas Stars	4–0		Quick	Staples Center	13,659	11–10–4	26	
26	December 11	Minnesota Wild	2–1		Quick	Staples Center	15,897	12–10–4	28	
27	December 14	@ Tampa Bay Lightning	2–3	OT	Quick	Amalie Arena	19,092	12–10–5	29	
28	December 16	@ Florida Panthers	4–1		Quick	FLA Live Arena	14,458	13–10–5	31	
29	December 18	@ Carolina Hurricanes	1–5		Quick	PNC Arena	16,238	13–11–5	31	
30	December 19	@ Washington Capitals	3–2		Sparks	Capital One Arena	18,573	14–11–5	33	
—	December 22	Edmonton Oilers	Postponed due to COVID-19. Moved to February February 15.							
—	December 23	@ Vegas Golden Knights	Postponed due to COVID-19. Moved to February 18.							
—	December 27	@ Arizona Coyotes	Postponed due to COVID-19. Moved to February 19.							
31	December 28	Vegas Golden Knights	3–6		Quick	Crypto.com Arena	14,887	14–12–5	33	
32	December 30	Vancouver Canucks	2–1	SO	Quick	Crypto.com Arena	14,514	15–12–5	35	

January: 8–4–2 (home: 4–3–0; road: 4–1–2)

Game	Date	Opponent	Score	OT	Decision	Location	Attendance	Record	Points	Recap
33	January 1	Philadelphia Flyers	6–3		Quick	Crypto.com Arena	14,301	16–12–5	37	
34	January 6	Nashville Predators	2–4		Quick	Crypto.com Arena	14,359	16–13–5	37	
35	January 8	Detroit Red Wings	4–0		Petersen	Crypto.com Arena	17,321	17–13–5	39	
36	January 10	New York Rangers	3–1		Petersen	Crypto.com Arena	13,558	18–13–5	41	
37	January 13	Pittsburgh Penguins	6–2		Quick	Crypto.com Arena	14,348	19–13–5	43	
38	January 15	@ Seattle Kraken	3–1		Petersen	Climate Pledge Arena	17,151	20–13–5	45	
39	January 17	@ San Jose Sharks	2–6		Quick	SAP Center	10,705	20–14–5	45	
40	January 18	Tampa Bay Lightning	4–6		Petersen	Crypto.com Arena	15,128	20–15–5	45	
41	January 20	Colorado Avalanche	1–4		Quick	Crypto.com Arena	15,387	20–16–5	45	
42	January 23	@ New Jersey Devils	3–2		Petersen	Prudential Center	11,354	21–16–5	47	
43	January 24	@ New York Rangers	2–3	SO	Quick	Madison Square Garden	15,666	21–16–6	48	
44	January 27	@ New York Islanders	3–2		Petersen	UBS Arena	17,255	22–16–6	50	
45	January 29	@ Philadelphia Flyers	3–4	OT	Quick	Wells Fargo Center	13,763	22–16–7	51	
46	January 30	@ Pittsburgh Penguins	4–3		Petersen	PPG Paints Arena	18,237	23–16–7	53	

February: 6–2–0 (home: 1–2–0; road: 5–0–0)

Game	Date	Opponent	Score	OT	Decision	Location	Attendance	Record	Points	Recap
47	February 2	@ Detroit Red Wings	5–3		Quick	Little Caesars Arena	11,553	24–16–7	55	
48	February 15	Edmonton Oilers	2–5		Petersen	Crypto.com Arena	15,494	24–17–7	55	
49	February 18	@ Vegas Golden Knights	4–3	OT	Quick	T-Mobile Arena	18,238	25–17–7	57	
50	February 19	@ Arizona Coyotes	5–3		Petersen	Gila River Arena	13,831	26–17–7	59	
51	February 23	@ Arizona Coyotes	3–2		Petersen	Gila River Arena	9,415	27–17–7	61	
52	February 25	@ Anaheim Ducks	4–1		Quick	Honda Center	17,174	28–17–7	63	
53	February 26	New York Islanders	5–2		Petersen	Crypto.com Arena	18,230	29–17–7	65	
54	February 28	Boston Bruins	0–7		Quick	Crypto.com Arena	16,067	29–18–7	65	

March: 8–5–3 (home: 4–2–2; road: 4–3–1)

Game	Date	Opponent	Score	OT	Decision	Location	Attendance	Record	Points	Recap
55	March 2	@ Dallas Stars	3–4		Petersen	American Airlines Center	18,046	29–19–7	65	
56	March 4	@ Columbus Blue Jackets	4–3	OT	Quick	Nationwide Arena	15,778	30–19–7	67	
57	March 6	@ Buffalo Sabres	3–0		Petersen	KeyBank Center	10,775	31–19–7	69	
58	March 7	@ Boston Bruins	3–2	OT	Petersen	TD Garden	17,850	32–19–7	71	
59	March 10	San Jose Sharks	3–4	OT	Quick	Crypto.com Arena	14,228	32–19–8	72	
60	March 12	@ San Jose Sharks	0–5		Petersen	SAP Center	13,821	32–20–8	72	
61	March 13	Florida Panthers	3–2	SO	Quick	Crypto.com Arena	15,822	33–20–8	74	
62	March 15	Colorado Avalanche	0–3		Quick	Crypto.com Arena	13,967	33–21–8	74	
63	March 17	San Jose Sharks	3–0		Petersen	Crypto.com Arena	13,137	34–21–8	76	
64	March 19	@ Vegas Golden Knights	1–5		Petersen	T-Mobile Arena	18,136	34–22–8	76	
65	March 22	Nashville Predators	6–1		Quick	Crypto.com Arena	12,629	35–22–8	78	
66	March 24	Chicago Blackhawks	3–4	SO	Quick	Crypto.com Arena	13,518	35–22–9	79	
67	March 26	Seattle Kraken	4–2		Petersen	Crypto.com Arena	18,230	36–22–9	81	
68	March 28	Seattle Kraken	1–6		Petersen	Crypto.com Arena	13,919	36–23–9	81	
69	March 30	@ Edmonton Oilers	3–4	SO	Quick	Rogers Place	16,472	36–23–10	82	
70	March 31	@ Calgary Flames	3–2	SO	Petersen	Scotiabank Saddledome	16,398	37–23–10	84	

April: 7–4–1 (home: 3–2–0; road: 4–2–1)

Game	Date	Opponent	Score	OT	Decision	Location	Attendance	Record	Points	Recap
71	April 2	@ Winnipeg Jets	3–2		Petersen	Canada Life Centre	14,067	38–23–10	86	
72	April 4	Calgary Flames	2–3		Petersen	Crypto.com Arena	13,464	38–24–10	86	
73	April 7	Edmonton Oilers	2–3		Quick	Crypto.com Arena	15,149	38–25–10	86	
74	April 10	@ Minnesota Wild	3–6		Petersen	Xcel Energy Center	19,104	38–26–10	86	
75	April 12	@ Chicago Blackhawks	5–2		Quick	United Center	18,032	39–26–10	88	
76	April 13	@ Colorado Avalanche	3–9		Petersen	Ball Arena	18,017	39–27–10	88	
77	April 16	Columbus Blue Jackets	2–1		Quick	Crypto.com Arena	18,230	40–27–10	90	
78	April 19	@ Anaheim Ducks	2–1		Quick	Honda Center	17,174	41–27–10	92	
79	April 21	Chicago Blackhawks	4–1		Quick	Crypto.com Arena	18,230	42–27–10	94	
80	April 23	Anaheim Ducks	4–2		Quick	Crypto.com Arena	18,230	43–27–10	96	
81	April 27	@ Seattle Kraken	5–3		Quick	Climate Pledge Arena	17,151	44–27–10	98	
82	April 28	@ Vancouver Canucks	2–3	OT	Petersen	Rogers Arena	18,779	44–27–11	99	

2021–22 schedule

Win (2 Points) Loss (0 points) Overtime/shootout loss (1 point)

=== Playoffs ===
2022 Stanley Cup playoffs

Western Conference First Round vs. (P2) Edmonton Oilers: Edmonton won 4–3
#	Date	Visitor	Score	Home	OT	Decision	Attendance	Series	Recap
1	May 2	Los Angeles	4–3	Edmonton		Quick	18,347	1–0
2	May 4	Los Angeles	0–6	Edmonton		Quick	18,347	1–1
3	May 6	Edmonton	8–2	Los Angeles		Quick	18,230	1–2
4	May 8	Edmonton	0–4	Los Angeles		Quick	18,230	2–2
5	May 10	Los Angeles	5–4	Edmonton	OT	Quick	18,347	3–2
6	May 12	Edmonton	4–2	Los Angeles		Quick	18,301	3–3
7	May 14	Los Angeles	0–2	Edmonton		Quick	18,347	3–4

Legend: Win Loss

== Player statistics ==
=== Skaters ===
Regular season
Player	GP	G	A	Pts	+/−	PIM
Anze Kopitar	81	19	48	67	−6	14
Adrian Kempe	78	35	19	54	−2	46
Phillip Danault	79	27	24	51	+14	38
Viktor Arvidsson	66	20	29	49	+1	22
Trevor Moore	81	17	31	48	+20	20
Alex Iafallo	79	17	20	37	+4	8
Drew Doughty	39	7	24	31	+4	30
Dustin Brown	64	9	19	28	−3	20
Arthur Kaliyev	80	14	13	27	−3	37
Sean Durzi	64	3	24	27	−9	55
Blake Lizotte	70	10	14	24	+15	28
Matt Roy	67	2	19	21	+23	28
Alexander Edler	41	3	16	19	+18	34
Andreas Athanasiou	28	11	6	17	+7	4
Carl Grundstrom	54	9	6	15	+4	26
Brendan Lemieux	50	8	5	13	+1	97
Rasmus Kupari	57	5	8	13	−5	18
Quinton Byfield	40	5	5	10	−7	20
Mikey Anderson	57	2	6	8	+6	8
Jordan Spence	24	2	6	8	0	2
Olli Maatta	66	1	7	8	+17	10
Tobias Bjornfot	70	0	8	8	−12	6
Gabriel Vilardi	25	5	2	7	−5	8
Kale Clague	11	0	5	5	−2	2
Martin Frk	6	2	0	2	−4	2
Christian Wolanin^{†}	8	1	1	2	+1	2
Lias Andersson	20	1	1	2	−7	12
Vladimir Tkachev	4	0	2	2	−2	2
Jacob Moverare	19	0	2	2	+3	2
Austin Strand	8	0	2	2	−1	0
Sean Walker	6	0	2	2	−1	4
Troy Stecher^{†}	13	0	1	1	−1	4
Jaret Anderson-Dolan	7	0	0	0	−3	4
Samuel Fagemo	4	0	0	0	−2	0
Alex Turcotte	8	0	0	0	0	2
T. J. Tynan	2	0	0	0	0	0

Playoffs
Player	GP	G	A	Pts	+/−	PIM
Adrian Kempe	7	2	4	6	−5	0
Phillip Danault	7	3	2	5	+6	2
Trevor Moore	7	2	3	5	0	16
Carl Grundstrom	6	3	1	4	−1	0
Troy Stecher	4	2	2	4	+4	0
Alex Iafallo	7	1	3	4	−1	4
Anze Kopitar	7	1	3	4	−6	2
Sean Durzi	7	1	2	3	−5	6
Alexander Edler	7	0	2	2	+4	14
Dustin Brown	7	0	2	2	−2	0
Brendan Lemieux	7	1	0	1	−1	18
Andreas Athanasiou	6	1	0	1	−5	4
Blake Lizotte	7	0	1	1	−1	16
Mikey Anderson	7	0	1	1	−5	4
Matt Roy	7	0	1	1	−3	0
Quinton Byfield	2	0	0	0	−2	4
Jordan Spence	3	0	0	0	−4	0
Arthur Kaliyev	7	0	0	0	−3	2
Rasmus Kupari	5	0	0	0	−1	2
Gabriel Vilardi	2	0	0	0	0	0
Olli Maatta	7	0	0	0	0	0

=== Goaltenders ===
Regular season
Player	GP	GS	TOI	W	L	OT	GA	GAA	SA	SV%	SO	G	A	PIM
Jonathan Quick	46	46	2,685:52	23	13	9	116	2.59	1,284	.910	2	0	1	6
Cal Petersen	37	35	2,176:30	20	14	2	105	2.89	1,002	.895	3	0	0	2
Garret Sparks	2	1	97:13	1	0	0	3	1.85	47	.936	0	0	0	0

Playoffs
Player	GP	GS	TOI	W	L	GA	GAA	SA	SV%	SO	G	A	PIM
Jonathan Quick	7	7	384:45	3	4	22	3.43	228	.904	1	0	0	0
Cal Petersen	1	0	32:14	0	0	4	7.45	20	.800	0	0	0	0

^{†}Denotes player spent time with another team before joining the Kings. Stats reflect time with the Kings only.
^{‡}Denotes player was traded mid-season. Stats reflect time with the Kings only.
Bold/italics denotes franchise record.

== Transactions ==
The Kings have been involved in the following transactions during the 2021–22 season.

=== Trades ===
Date	Details		Ref
July 24, 2021	To Arizona Coyotes Cole Hults; Bokondji Imama	To Los Angeles Kings Brayden Burke; Tyler Steenbergen	
July 24, 2021	To Ottawa Senators STL 2nd-round pick in 2021; 5th-round pick in 2021	To Los Angeles Kings 2nd-round pick in 2021	
July 24, 2021	To Carolina Hurricanes 3rd-round pick in 2021; CGY 4th-round pick in 2021	To Los Angeles Kings 2nd-round pick in 2021	
July 24, 2021	To Calgary Flames TOR 3rd-round pick in 2021; 6th-round pick in 2021	To Los Angeles Kings EDM 3rd-round pick in 2021	
March 20, 2022	To Detroit Red Wings 7th-round pick in 2022	To Los Angeles Kings Troy Stecher	
March 21, 2022	To Nashville Predators Brayden Burke	To Los Angeles Kings Frederic Allard	
March 21, 2022	To Winnipeg Jets Markus Phillips	To Los Angeles Kings Nelson Nogier	
June 29, 2022	To Minnesota Wild Brock Faber; 1st-round pick in 2022	To Los Angeles Kings Kevin Fiala	

=== Players acquired ===
Date	Player	Former team	Term	Via	Ref
July 28, 2021	Phillip Danault	Montreal Canadiens	6-year	Free agency	
July 28, 2021	Alexander Edler	Vancouver Canucks	1-year	Free agency	
July 28, 2021	Garret Sparks	Stockton Heat (AHL)	1-year	Free agency	
July 28, 2021	T. J. Tynan	Colorado Avalanche	1-year	Free agency	
March 19, 2022	Taylor Ward	Omaha Mavericks (NCHC)	1-year	Free agency	

=== Players lost ===
Date	Player	New team	Term	Via	Ref
July 21, 2021	Kurtis MacDermid	Seattle Kraken		Expansion draft	
July 28, 2021	Michael Eyssimont	Winnipeg Jets	2-year	Free agency	
July 28, 2021	Troy Grosenick	Boston Bruins	1-year	Free agency	
July 28, 2021	Matt Luff	Nashville Predators	1-year	Free agency	
August 2, 2021	Mark Alt	San Jose Barracuda (AHL)	1-year	Free agency	
August 23, 2021	Tyler Steenbergen	TPS (Liiga)	1-year	Free agency	
September 1, 2021	Daniel Brickley	Chicago Wolves (AHL)	1-year	Free agency	
September 8, 2021	Drake Rymsha	Fort Wayne Komets (ECHL)	1-year	Free agency	
October 16, 2021	Christian Wolanin	Buffalo Sabres		Waivers	
June 20, 2022	Vladimir Tkachev	Avangard Omsk (KHL)	1-year	Free agency	

=== Signings ===
Date	Player	Term	Contract type	Ref
July 24, 2021	Trevor Moore	2-year	Re-signing	
July 28, 2021	Andreas Athanasiou	1-year	Re-signing	
July 30, 2021	Lias Andersson	1-year	Re-signing	
August 1, 2021	Brayden Burke	1-year	Re-signing	
August 13, 2021	Samuel Helenius	3-year	Entry-level	
August 13, 2021	Jacob Moverare	1-year	Re-signing	
September 22, 2021	Cal Petersen	3-year	Extension	
September 30, 2021	Martin Chromiak	3-year	Entry-level	
March 22, 2022	Blake Lizotte	2-year	Extension	
March 29, 2022	David Hrenak	1-year	Entry-level	
March 29, 2022	Andre Lee	2-year	Entry-level	
March 30, 2022	Kim Nousiainen	3-year	Entry-level	
April 11, 2022	Francesco Pinelli	3-year	Entry-level	
June 14, 2022	T. J. Tynan	2-year	Extension	
June 15, 2022	Jacob Moverare	2-year	Extension	
July 1, 2022	Frederic Allard	1-year	Extension	
July 1, 2022	Matt Villalta	1-year	Extension	

== Draft picks ==
Below are the Los Angeles Kings selections at the 2021 NHL entry draft, which will be held on July 23 and 24, 2021, virtually via video conference call from the NHL Network studio in Secaucus, New Jersey, due to the COVID-19 pandemic.

Round	#	Player	Pos	Nationality	College/Junior/Club team (League)
1	8	Brandt Clarke	D	Canada	HC Nové Zámky (Slovak Extraliga)
2	42^{2}	Francesco Pinelli	C	Canada	HDD Jesenice (AlpsHL)
2	59^{3}	Samuel Helenius	C	Finland	JYP (Liiga)
3	84^{5}	Kirill Kirsanov	D	Russia	SKA Saint Petersburg (KHL)
