= 2021–22 San Jose Sharks season =

Season of Ice hockey team

2021–22 San Jose Sharks
- Division: 6th Pacific
- Conference: 12th Western
- 2021–22 record: 32–37–13
- Home record: 18–18–5
- Road record: 14–19–8
- Goals for: 214
- Goals against: 264

Team information
- General manager: Doug Wilson (Oct 16 – Apr. 7); Joe Will (acting) (Apr. 7 – Apr. 29)
- Coach: Bob Boughner
- Captain: Logan Couture
- Alternate captains: Brent Burns; Mario Ferraro; Tomas Hertl; Erik Karlsson
- Arena: SAP Center
- Average attendance: 12,573
- Minor league affiliate: San Jose Barracuda (AHL)

Team leaders
- Goals: Timo Meier (35)
- Assists: Brent Burns (44)
- Points: Timo Meier (76)
- Penalty minutes: Jeffrey Viel (114)
- Plus/minus: Sasha Chmelevski (+2)
- Wins: James Reimer (19)
- Goals against average: Adin Hill (2.66)

The 2021–22 San Jose Sharks season was the 31st season for the National Hockey League (NHL) franchise that was established on May 9, 1990.

General manager Doug Wilson took medical leave beginning on November 26, 2021, and would resign from the role on April 7, 2022, ending a 19-season tenure with the team. Assistant general manager Joe Will had already been serving as acting general manager since Wilson took medical leave, and will continue to do so until the team finds a permanent candidate for the role. On April 14, the Sharks were eliminated from playoff contention after losing to the Chicago Blackhawks.

== Standings ==
=== Divisional standings ===
Pacific Division
Pos	Team	GP	W	L	OTL	RW	GF	GA	GD	Pts
1	y – Calgary Flames	82	50	21	11	44	293	208	+85	111
2	x – Edmonton Oilers	82	49	27	6	38	290	252	+38	104
3	x – Los Angeles Kings	82	44	27	11	35	239	236	+3	99
4	Vegas Golden Knights	82	43	31	8	34	266	248	+18	94
5	Vancouver Canucks	82	40	30	12	32	249	236	+13	92
6	San Jose Sharks	82	32	37	13	22	214	264	−50	77
7	Anaheim Ducks	82	31	37	14	22	232	271	−39	76
8	Seattle Kraken	82	27	49	6	23	216	285	−69	60

Source: National Hockey League
Rules for classification: 1) Fewer number of games played (GP, only during regular season); 2) Greater number of regulation wins (RW); 3) Greater number of wins in regulation and overtime, excluding shootout wins (ROW); 4) Greater number of total wins, including shootouts (W); 5) Greater number of points earned in head-to-head play; if teams played an uneven number of head-to-head games, the result of the first game on the home ice of the team with the extra home game is discarded; 6) Greater goal differential (GD); 7) Greater number of goals scored (GF)
x – Clinched playoff spot; y – Clinched division

=== Conference standings ===
Western Conference Wild Card
Pos	Div	Team	GP	W	L	OTL	RW	GF	GA	GD	Pts
1	CE	x – Dallas Stars	82	46	30	6	31	238	246	−8	98
2	CE	x – Nashville Predators	82	45	30	7	35	266	252	+14	97
3	PA	Vegas Golden Knights	82	43	31	8	34	266	248	+18	94
4	PA	Vancouver Canucks	82	40	30	12	32	249	236	+13	92
5	CE	Winnipeg Jets	82	39	32	11	32	252	257	−5	89
6	PA	San Jose Sharks	82	32	37	13	22	214	264	−50	77
7	PA	Anaheim Ducks	82	31	37	14	22	232	271	−39	76
8	CE	Chicago Blackhawks	82	28	42	12	16	219	291	−72	68
9	PA	Seattle Kraken	82	27	49	6	23	216	285	−69	60
10	CE	Arizona Coyotes	82	25	50	7	18	207	313	−106	57

Source: National Hockey League
Rules for classification: 1) Fewer number of games played (GP, only during regular season); 2) Greater number of regulation wins (RW); 3) Greater number of wins in regulation and overtime, excluding shootout wins (ROW); 4) Greater number of total wins, including shootouts (W); 5) Greater number of points earned in head-to-head play; if teams played an uneven number of head-to-head games, the result of the first game on the home ice of the team with the extra home game is discarded; 6) Greater goal differential (GD); 7) Greater number of goals scored (GF)
x – Clinched playoff spot

== Schedule and results ==
=== Preseason ===
The schedule was announced on August 4, 2021.

2021 preseason game log: 3–2–1 (home: 1–1–1; road: 2–1–0)
#	Date	Opponent	Score	OT	Decision	Arena	Attendance	Record	Recap
1	September 26	@ Anaheim	3–6		Sawchenko	Honda Center	N/A	0–1–0	Recap
2	September 26	@ Vegas	4–2		Hill	T-Mobile Arena	17,077	1–1–0	Recap
3	September 28	Los Angeles	3–4		Reimer	SAP Center	6,837	1–2–0	Recap
4	September 30	@ Anaheim	3–1		Reimer	Honda Center	N/A	2–2–0	Recap
5	October 4	Anaheim	2–3	SO	Reimer	SAP Center	6,192	2–2–1	Recap
6	October 9	Vegas	4–0		Hill	SAP Center	N/A	3–2–1	Recap

=== Regular season ===
The schedule was announced on July 22, 2021, and was tentative pending on whether the league and the International Olympic Committee reach a deal to send players to the 2022 Winter Olympics. If no deal would have been reached, then an alternative schedule without an Olympics break would have been released and up to 16 of the team's home dates would have been rescheduled. An agreement was made on September 3, 2021. However, on December 22, 2021, the NHL decided to skip the Olympics due to a rise of COVID-19 cases. In place of missing the Olympics, the NHL used that time to reschedule postponed regular season games.

2021–22 game log: 32–37–13 (home: 18–18–5; road: 14–19–8)

October: 5–3–0 (home: 2–1–0; road: 3–2–0)
#	Date	Opponent	Score	OT	Decision	Arena	Attendance	Record	Pts	Recap
1	October 16	Winnipeg	4–3		Hill	SAP Center	16,137	1–0–0	2	Recap
2	October 19	@ Montreal	5–0		Hill	Bell Centre	16,095	2–0–0	4	Recap
3	October 21	@ Ottawa	2–1		Reimer	Canadian Tire Centre	8,994	3–0–0	6	Recap
4	October 22	@ Toronto	5–3		Hill	Scotiabank Arena	18,603	4–0–0	8	Recap
5	October 24	@ Boston	3–4		Hill	TD Garden	17,850	4–1–0	8	Recap
6	October 26	@ Nashville	1–3		Reimer	Bridgestone Arena	16,395	4–2–0	8	Recap
7	October 28	Montreal	0–4		Hill	SAP Center	11,463	4–3–0	8	Recap
8	October 30	Winnipeg	2–1	OT	Reimer	SAP Center	11,845	5–3–0	10	Recap

November: 7–6–1 (home: 3–3–1; road: 4–3–0)
#	Date	Opponent	Score	OT	Decision	Arena	Attendance	Record	Pts	Recap
9	November 2	Buffalo	5–3		Reimer	SAP Center	10,059	6–3–0	12	Recap
10	November 4	St. Louis	3–5		Hill	SAP Center	11,816	6–4–0	12	Recap
11	November 6	New Jersey	2–3	SO	Reimer	SAP Center	12,019	6–4–1	13	Recap
12	November 9	@ Calgary	4–1		Hill	Scotiabank Saddledome	14,960	7–4–1	15	Recap
13	November 11	@ Winnipeg	1–4		Reimer	Canada Life Centre	14,229	7–5–1	15	Recap
14	November 13	@ Colorado	2–6		Hill	Ball Arena	18,015	7–6–1	15	Recap
15	November 16	@ Minnesota	4–1		Reimer	Xcel Energy Center	15,367	8–6–1	17	Recap
16	November 18	@ St. Louis	1–4		Reimer	Enterprise Center	16,953	8–7–1	17	Recap
17	November 20	Washington	0–4		Hill	SAP Center	16,527	8–8–1	17	Recap
18	November 22	Carolina	2–1	OT	Reimer	SAP Center	10,970	9–8–1	19	Recap
19	November 24	Ottawa	6–3		Reimer	SAP Center	10,076	10–8–1	21	Recap
20	November 26	Toronto	1–4		Reimer	SAP Center	14,068	10–9–1	21	Recap
21	November 28	@ Chicago	2–0		Reimer	United Center	17,663	11–9–1	23	Recap
22	November 30	@ New Jersey	5–2		Reimer	Prudential Center	13,492	12–9–1	25	Recap

December: 5–5–0 (home: 4–3–0; road: 1–2–0)
#	Date	Opponent	Score	OT	Decision	Arena	Attendance	Record	Pts	Recap
23	December 2	@ NY Islanders	2–1	OT	Hill	UBS Arena	17,255	13–9–1	27	Recap
24	December 3	@ NY Rangers	0–1		Hill	Madison Square Garden	16,726	13–10–1	27	Recap
25	December 5	@ Columbus	4–6		Hill	Nationwide Arena	16,824	13–11–1	27	Recap
26	December 7	Calgary	5–3		Hill	SAP Center	10,534	14–11–1	29	Recap
27	December 9	Minnesota	2–5		Hill	SAP Center	10,782	14–12–1	29	Recap
28	December 11	Dallas	2–1		Reimer	SAP Center	14,145	15–12–1	31	Recap
29	December 14	Seattle	1–3		Reimer	SAP Center	12,403	15–13–1	31	Recap
30	December 16	Vancouver	2–5		Hill	SAP Center	10,340	15–14–1	31	Recap
–	December 21	Vancouver	Postponed. (Note: This game was originally scheduled for December 21 before being postponed on December 19 due to federal travel restrictions surrounding COVID-19. On January 19, it was announced that this game will be rescheduled for February 14.)
–	December 23	Edmonton	Postponed. (Note: This game was originally scheduled for December 23 before being postponed on December 19 due to federal travel restrictions surrounding COVID-19. On January 19, it was announced that this game will be rescheduled for February 17.)
–	December 27	@ Anaheim	Postponed. (Note: This game was originally scheduled for December 27 before being postponed on December 24 to allow more time for COVID-19 testing throughout the league. On January 19, it was announced that this game will be rescheduled for February 22.)
31	December 28	Arizona	8–7	SO	Reimer	SAP Center	11,450	16–14–1	33	Recap
32	December 30	Philadelphia	3–2	OT	Reimer	SAP Center	12,540	17–14–1	35	Recap

January: 5–6–2 (home: 2–2–1; road: 3–4–1)
#	Date	Opponent	Score	OT	Decision	Arena	Attendance	Record	Pts	Recap
33	January 2	@ Pittsburgh	5–8		Reimer	PPG Paints Arena	18,066	17–15–1	35	Recap
34	January 4	@ Detroit	2–6		Reimer	Little Caesars Arena	14,524	17–16–1	35	Recap
35	January 6	@ Buffalo	3–2		Hill	KeyBank Center	8,117	18–16–1	37	Recap
36	January 8	@ Philadelphia	3–2	OT	Hill	Wells Fargo Center	15,600	19–16–1	39	Recap
37	January 11	Detroit	3–2	OT	Hill	SAP Center	10,489	20–16–1	41	Recap
38	January 13	NY Rangers	0–3		Hill	SAP Center	10,919	20–17–1	41	Recap
39	January 15	Pittsburgh	1–2	OT	Hill	SAP Center	13,686	20–17–2	42	Recap
40	January 17	Los Angeles	6–2		Reimer	SAP Center	10,705	21–17–2	44	Recap
41	January 20	@ Seattle	2–3		Hill	Climate Pledge Arena	17,151	21–18–2	44	Recap
42	January 22	Tampa Bay	1–7		Reimer	SAP Center	14,193	21–19–2	44	Recap
43	January 26	@ Washington	4–1		Reimer	Capital One Arena	18,573	22–19–2	46	Recap
44	January 29	@ Florida	4–5	OT	Reimer	FLA Live Arena	18,152	22–19–3	47	Recap
45	January 30	@ Carolina	1–2		Reimer	PNC Arena	15,975	22–20–3	47	Recap

February: 2–3–3 (home: 2–3–1; road: 0–0–2)
#	Date	Opponent	Score	OT	Decision	Arena	Attendance	Record	Pts	Recap
46	February 1	@ Tampa Bay	2–3	OT	Reimer	Amalie Arena	19,092	22–20–4	48	Recap
47	February 14	Edmonton	0–3		Reimer	SAP Center	11,513	22–21–4	48	Recap
48	February 17	Vancouver	4–5	OT	Reimer	SAP Center	10,608	22–21–5	49	Recap
49	February 20 (Note: This game was originally scheduled for April 10 before being rescheduled to February 20 due to schedule adjustments made throughout the league.)	Vegas	1–4		Reimer	SAP Center	11,504	22–22–5	49	Recap
50	February 22	@ Anaheim	3–4	SO	Reimer	Honda Center	13,288	22–22–6	50	Recap
51	February 24	NY Islanders	4–3	SO	Reimer	SAP Center	11,283	23–22–6	52	Recap
52	February 26	Boston	1–3		Reimer	SAP Center	17,260	23–23–6	52	Recap
53	February 27	Seattle	3–1		Reimer	SAP Center	13,171	24–23–6	54	Recap

March: 5–7–2 (home: 3–2–1; road: 2–5–1)
#	Date	Opponent	Score	OT	Decision	Arena	Attendance	Record	Pts	Recap
54	March 1	@ Vegas	1–3		Sawchenko	T-Mobile Arena	17,819	24–24–6	54	Recap
55	March 5	Nashville	0–8		Stalock	SAP Center	13,936	24–25–6	54	Recap
56	March 6	@ Anaheim	2–3	OT	Sawchenko	Honda Center	12,183	24–25–7	55	Recap
57	March 10	@ Los Angeles	4–3	OT	Sawchenko	Crypto.com Arena	14,228	25–25–7	57	Recap
58	March 12	Los Angeles	5–0		Hill	SAP Center	13,821	26–25–7	59	Recap
59	March 15	Florida	2–3	OT	Reimer	SAP Center	12,276	26–25–8	60	Recap
60	March 17	@ Los Angeles	0–3		Reimer	Crypto.com Arena	13,137	26–26–8	60	Recap
61	March 18	Colorado	3–5		Sawchenko	SAP Center	13,022	26–27–8	60	Recap
62	March 20	Arizona	4–2		Reimer	SAP Center	13,349	27–27–8	62	Recap
63	March 22	@ Calgary	4–3		Reimer	Scotiabank Saddledome	15,594	28–27–8	64	Recap
64	March 24	@ Edmonton	2–5		Kahkonen	Rogers Place	16,740	28–28–8	64	Recap
65	March 26	Anaheim	4–1		Reimer	SAP Center	14,161	29–28–8	66	Recap
66	March 30	@ Arizona	2–5		Reimer	Gila River Arena	9,949	29–29–8	66	Recap
67	March 31	@ Colorado	2–4		Kahkonen	Ball Arena	18,013	29–30–8	66	Recap

April: 3–7–5 (home: 2–4–1; road: 1–3–4)
#	Date	Opponent	Score	OT	Decision	Arena	Attendance	Record	Pts	Recap
68	April 2	Dallas	4–5		Reimer	SAP Center	14,021	29–31–8	66	Recap
69	April 5	Edmonton	1–2	OT	Reimer	SAP Center	12,046	29–31–9	67	Recap
70	April 7	Calgary	2–4		Reimer	SAP Center	11,426	29–32–9	67	Recap
71	April 9	@ Vancouver	2–4		Kahkonen	Rogers Arena	18,607	29–33–9	67	Recap
–	April 10	Vegas	Rescheduled.
72	April 12	@ Nashville	0–1	OT	Kahkonen	Bridgestone Arena	17,159	29–33–10	68	Recap
73	April 14	@ Chicago	4–5	SO	Reimer	United Center	19,501	29–33–11	69	Recap
74	April 16	@ Dallas	1–2		Kahkonen	American Airlines Center	18,532	29–34–11	69	Recap
75	April 17	@ Minnesota	4–5	OT	Reimer	Xcel Energy Center	19,029	29–34–12	70	Recap
76	April 19	Columbus	3–2		Kahkonen	SAP Center	11,894	30–34–12	72	Recap
77	April 21	St. Louis	1–3		Reimer	SAP Center	12,136	30–35–12	72	Recap
78	April 23	Chicago	4–1		Kahkonen	SAP Center	17,562	31–35–12	74	Recap
79	April 24	@ Vegas	5–4	SO	Reimer	T-Mobile Arena	18,367	32–35–12	76	Recap
80	April 26	Anaheim	2–5		Kahkonen	SAP Center	13,378	32–36–12	76	Recap
81	April 28	@ Edmonton	4–5	OT	Reimer	Rogers Place	16,692	32–36–13	77	Recap
82	April 29	@ Seattle	0–3		Kahkonen	Climate Pledge Arena	17,151	32–37–13	77	Recap

Legend: Win (2 points) Loss (0 points) Overtime/shootout loss (1 point) Postponement

== Player statistics ==
=== Skaters ===
Regular season
Player	GP	G	A	Pts	+/−	PIM
Timo Meier	77	35	41	76	−3	54
Tomas Hertl	82	30	34	64	−9	30
Logan Couture	77	23	33	56	−11	18
Brent Burns	82	10	44	54	−15	42
Alexander Barabanov	70	10	29	39	−5	14
Erik Karlsson	50	10	25	35	−14	14
Nick Bonino	80	16	10	26	−25	18
Rudolfs Balcers	61	11	12	23	−3	20
Noah Gregor	63	8	15	23	−21	25
Jonathan Dahlen	61	12	10	22	−25	12
Matt Nieto	70	6	11	17	−20	19
Andrew Cogliano^{‡}	56	4	11	15	−16	12
Marc-Edouard Vlasic	75	3	11	14	−22	18
Mario Ferraro	63	2	12	14	−5	16
Jasper Weatherby	50	5	6	11	−14	18
Scott Reedy	35	7	2	9	−8	10
Jacob Middleton^{‡}	45	3	6	9	+3	69
Jaycob Megna	44	2	6	8	−1	16
Sasha Chmelevski	19	0	8	8	+2	4
Nicolas Meloche	50	2	5	7	−17	39
Kevin Labanc	21	3	3	6	−4	6
Ryan Merkley	39	1	5	6	−10	8
Jeffrey Viel	34	3	2	5	−2	114
Thomas Bordeleau	8	0	5	5	−1	0
William Eklund	9	0	4	4	−3	2
Nick Merkley	9	1	2	3	−2	0
Jonah Gadjovich	43	1	2	3	−9	74
John Leonard	14	1	1	2	−5	0
Radim Simek	36	1	1	2	−13	8
Santeri Hatakka	9	0	2	2	−5	2
Lane Pederson	29	0	2	2	−16	10
Ryan Dzingel^{†}	6	1	0	1	−2	0
Jayden Halbgewachs	3	0	1	1	+1	4
Adam Raska	5	0	0	0	+1	7
Artemi Kniazev	1	0	0	0	−2	0

=== Goaltenders ===
Regular season
Player	GP	GS	TOI	W	L	OT	GA	GAA	SA	SV%	SO	G	A	PIM
James Reimer	48	46	2672:41	19	17	10	129	2.90	1,450	.911	1	0	0	0
Adin Hill	25	22	1375:57	10	11	1	61	2.66	648	.906	2	0	2	0
Kaapo Kahkonen^{†}	11	10	565:59	2	6	1	27	2.86	322	.916	0	0	0	0
Zach Sawchenko	7	3	268:58	1	2	1	15	3.35	151	.901	0	0	0	0
Alex Stalock^{†}	1	1	46:07	0	1	0	6	7.81	28	.786	0	0	0	0

^{†}Denotes player spent time with another team before joining the Sharks. Stats reflect time with the Sharks only.
^{‡}Denotes player was traded mid-season. Stats reflect time with the Sharks only.

== Transactions ==
The Sharks have been involved in the following transactions during the 2021–22 season.

=== Trades ===
Date	Details		Ref
July 17, 2021	To Arizona Coyotes Josef Korenar; 2nd-round pick in 2022	To San Jose Sharks Adin Hill; 7th-round pick in 2022	
July 26, 2021	To New Jersey Devils Christian Jaros	To San Jose Sharks Nick Merkley	
July 28, 2021	To Arizona Coyotes 4th-round pick in 2024	To San Jose Sharks Lane Pederson	
October 24, 2021	To Ottawa Senators Dylan Gambrell	To San Jose Sharks 7th-round pick in 2022	
March 2, 2022	To Edmonton Oilers Future considerations	To San Jose Sharks Alex Stalock	
March 21, 2022	To Minnesota Wild Jacob Middleton	To San Jose Sharks Kaapo Kahkonen; 5th-round pick in 2022	
March 21, 2022	To New York Rangers Nick Merkley	To San Jose Sharks Anthony Bitetto	
March 21, 2022	To Colorado Avalanche Andrew Cogliano	To San Jose Sharks 5th-round pick in 2024	
March 21, 2022	To Tampa Bay Lightning Alexei Melnichuk	To San Jose Sharks Antoine Morand	

=== Players acquired ===
Date	Player	Former team	Term	Via	Ref
July 28, 2021	Nick Bonino	Minnesota Wild	2-year	Free agency	
July 28, 2021	Andrew Cogliano	Dallas Stars	1-year	Free agency	
July 28, 2021	James Reimer	Carolina Hurricanes	2-year	Free agency	
July 29, 2021	Jaycob Megna	San Jose Barracuda (AHL)	1-year	Free agency	
October 7, 2021	Jonah Gadjovich	Vancouver Canucks		Waivers	
February 21, 2022	Ryan Dzingel	Arizona Coyotes		Waivers	
April 11, 2022	Nick Cicek	San Jose Barracuda (AHL)	2-year	Free agency	
April 14, 2022	Max Veronneau	Leksands IF (SHL)	1-year	Free agency	
April 19, 2022	Strauss Mann	Skellefteå AIK (SHL)	1-year	Free agency	
May 19, 2022	Mitchell Russell	North Bay Battalion (OHL)	3-year	Free agency	
June 1, 2022	Gannon Laroque	Victoria Royals (WHL)	3-year	Free agency	

=== Players lost ===
Date	Player	New team	Term	Via	Ref
July 21, 2021	Alexander True	Seattle Kraken		Expansion draft	
July 23, 2021	Lean Bergmann			Contract termination	
July 26, 2021	Lean Bergmann	Adler Mannheim (DEL)	2-year	Free agency	
July 27, 2021	Martin Jones			Buy-out	
July 28, 2021	Kurtis Gabriel	Toronto Maple Leafs	1-year	Free agency	
July 28, 2021	Martin Jones	Philadelphia Flyers	1-year	Free agency	
July 29, 2021	Greg Pateryn	Anaheim Ducks	1-year	Free agency	
July 31, 2021	Maxim Letunov	Carolina Hurricanes	1-year	Free agency	
August 30, 2021	Ivan Chekhovich			Contract termination	
September 1, 2021	Ivan Chekhovich	Torpedo Nizhny Novgorod (KHL)	Unknown	Free agency	
September 5, 2021	Marcus Sorensen	Djurgårdens IF (SHL)	4-year	Free agency	
September 12, 2021	Vladislav Kotkov			Contract termination	
September 13, 2021	Ryan Donato	Seattle Kraken	1-year	Free agency	
September 14, 2021	Vladislav Kotkov	CSKA Moscow (KHL)	2-year	Free agency	
December 15, 2021	Joel Kellman			Contract termination	
December 16, 2021	Joel Kellman	Växjö Lakers (SHL)	2-year	Free agency	
January 8, 2022	Evander Kane			Contract termination	
June 8, 2022	Joachim Blichfeld	Växjö Lakers (SHL)	2-year	Free agency	

=== Signings ===
Date	Player	Term	Contract type	Ref
July 22, 2021	Rudolfs Balcers	2-year	Re-signing	
July 22, 2021	Joachim Blichfeld	1-year	Re-signing	
July 29, 2021	Nick Merkley	1-year	Re-signing	
August 4, 2021	Adin Hill	2-year	Re-signing	
August 16, 2021	William Eklund	3-year	Entry-level	
August 24, 2021	Jasper Weatherby	2-year	Entry-level	
September 13, 2021	Noah Gregor	1-year	Re-signing	
December 6, 2021	Brandon Coe	3-year	Entry-level	
March 16, 2022	Tomas Hertl	8-year	Extension	
April 1, 2022	Nikolai Knyzhov	1-year	Extension	
April 16, 2022	Thomas Bordeleau	3-year	Entry-level	
May 9, 2022	Alexander Barabanov	2-year	Extension	
May 9, 2022	Jaycob Megna	2-year	Extension	
June 1, 2022	Gannon Laroque	3-year	Entry-level	

== Draft picks ==
Below are the San Jose Sharks' selections at the 2021 NHL entry draft, which was held on July 23 to 24, 2021 virtually via Video conference call from the NHL Network studio in Secaucus, New Jersey, United States.

Round	#	Player	Pos	Nationality	College/Junior/Club (League)
1	7	William Eklund	LW	Sweden	Djurgardens IF (SHL)
3	81^{2}	Benjamin Gaudreau	G	Canada	Sarnia Sting (OHL)
4	103	Gannon Laroque	D	Canada	Victoria Royals (WHL)
4	121^{3}	Ethan Cardwell	C	Canada	Barrie Colts (OHL)
5	135	Artem Guryev	D	Russia	Lindsay Muskies (OJHL)
5	156^{4}	Max Mccue	C	Canada	London Knights (OHL)
6	167	Liam Gilmartin	LW	United States	U.S. NTDP (USHL)
6	177^{2}	Theo Jacobsson	C	Sweden	Modo Jr. (SWE)
7	199	Evgenii Kashnikov	D	Russia	Gatineau Olympiques (QMJHL)

Notes:

1. The San Jose Sharks' second-round pick went to the Ottawa Senators as the result of a trade on September 13, 2018, that sent Erik Karlsson and Francis Perron to San Jose in exchange for Chris Tierney, Dylan DeMelo, Josh Norris, Rudolfs Balcers, a conditional second-round pick in 2019, a conditional l first-round pick in 2019 or 2020, a conditional first-round pick no later than 2022, and this pick (being conditional at the time of the trade). The condition – Ottawa will receive a second-round pick in 2021 if Karlsson re-signs with the Sharks for the 2019–20 NHL season and the Sharks do not make the 2019 Stanley Cup Finals – was converted on June 17, 2019, when Karlsson re-signed with San Jose for the 2019–20 NHL season.
2. The St. Louis Blues' third and sixth-round pick went to the San Jose Sharks as a result of a trade on July 24, 2021, that sent the Sharks' third-round pick to the Blues.
3. The Toronto Maple Leafs' fourth-round pick went to the San Jose Sharks as a result of a trade on April 11, 2021, that sent Nick Foligno to Toronto.
4. The Colorado Avalanche's fifth-round pick went to the San Jose Sharks as a result of a trade on April 10, 2021, that sent Devan Dubnyk to Colorado in exchange for Greg Pateryn.

== Awards ==
Regular season
Player	Award	Awarded
Tomas Hertl	Third star of the week	January 10, 2022
Timo Meier	All-Star; Third star of the week	January 13, 2022; January 24, 2022
