= 2021–22 Vegas Golden Knights season =

Season of play of professional ice hockey team

2021–22 Vegas Golden Knights
- Division: 4th Pacific
- Conference: 9th Western
- 2021–22 record: 43–31–8
- Home record: 22–15–4
- Road record: 21–16–4
- Goals for: 266
- Goals against: 248

Team information
- General manager: Kelly McCrimmon
- Coach: Peter DeBoer
- Captain: Mark Stone
- Alternate captains: Alex Pietrangelo; Reilly Smith
- Arena: T-Mobile Arena
- Average attendance: 18,100
- Minor league affiliates: Henderson Silver Knights (AHL); Fort Wayne Komets (ECHL)

Team leaders
- Goals: Jonathan Marchessault (30)
- Assists: Chandler Stephenson (43)
- Points: Jonathan Marchessault (66)
- Penalty minutes: Keegan Kolesar (68)
- Plus/minus: Zach Whitecloud (+21)
- Wins: Robin Lehner (23)
- Goals against average: Logan Thompson (2.68)

The 2021–22 Vegas Golden Knights season was the fifth season for the National Hockey League (NHL) franchise that started playing in the 2017–18 season. Despite high expectations entering the season, the Golden Knights missed the playoffs for the first (and, as of the 2025–26 season, only) time in franchise history, as they were eliminated from playoff contention following a 4–3 shootout loss to the Chicago Blackhawks on April 27, 2022.

== Standings ==
=== Divisional standings ===
Pacific Division
Pos	Team	GP	W	L	OTL	RW	GF	GA	GD	Pts
1	y – Calgary Flames	82	50	21	11	44	293	208	+85	111
2	x – Edmonton Oilers	82	49	27	6	38	290	252	+38	104
3	x – Los Angeles Kings	82	44	27	11	35	239	236	+3	99
4	Vegas Golden Knights	82	43	31	8	34	266	248	+18	94
5	Vancouver Canucks	82	40	30	12	32	249	236	+13	92
6	San Jose Sharks	82	32	37	13	22	214	264	−50	77
7	Anaheim Ducks	82	31	37	14	22	232	271	−39	76
8	Seattle Kraken	82	27	49	6	23	216	285	−69	60

Source: National Hockey League
Rules for classification: 1) Fewer number of games played (GP, only during regular season); 2) Greater number of regulation wins (RW); 3) Greater number of wins in regulation and overtime, excluding shootout wins (ROW); 4) Greater number of total wins, including shootouts (W); 5) Greater number of points earned in head-to-head play; if teams played an uneven number of head-to-head games, the result of the first game on the home ice of the team with the extra home game is discarded; 6) Greater goal differential (GD); 7) Greater number of goals scored (GF)
x – Clinched playoff spot; y – Clinched division

=== Conference standings ===
Western Conference Wild Card
Pos	Div	Team	GP	W	L	OTL	RW	GF	GA	GD	Pts
1	CE	x – Dallas Stars	82	46	30	6	31	238	246	−8	98
2	CE	x – Nashville Predators	82	45	30	7	35	266	252	+14	97
3	PA	Vegas Golden Knights	82	43	31	8	34	266	248	+18	94
4	PA	Vancouver Canucks	82	40	30	12	32	249	236	+13	92
5	CE	Winnipeg Jets	82	39	32	11	32	252	257	−5	89
6	PA	San Jose Sharks	82	32	37	13	22	214	264	−50	77
7	PA	Anaheim Ducks	82	31	37	14	22	232	271	−39	76
8	CE	Chicago Blackhawks	82	28	42	12	16	219	291	−72	68
9	PA	Seattle Kraken	82	27	49	6	23	216	285	−69	60
10	CE	Arizona Coyotes	82	25	50	7	18	207	313	−106	57

Source: National Hockey League
Rules for classification: 1) Fewer number of games played (GP, only during regular season); 2) Greater number of regulation wins (RW); 3) Greater number of wins in regulation and overtime, excluding shootout wins (ROW); 4) Greater number of total wins, including shootouts (W); 5) Greater number of points earned in head-to-head play; if teams played an uneven number of head-to-head games, the result of the first game on the home ice of the team with the extra home game is discarded; 6) Greater goal differential (GD); 7) Greater number of goals scored (GF)
x – Clinched playoff spot

== Schedule and results ==
=== Regular season ===
The regular season schedule was published on July 22, 2021. Due to COVID-19-related postponements and the NHL's withdrawal from Olympic participation, substantial updates to the schedule were published on January 19, 2022.

2021–22 game log

October: 4–4–0 (home: 2–2–0; road: 2–2–0)
#	Date	Visitor	Score	Home	OT	Decision	Attendance	Record	Pts	Recap
1	October 12	Seattle	3–4	Vegas		Lehner	18,431	1–0–0	2
2	October 14	Vegas	2–6	Los Angeles		Lehner	16,589	1–1–0	2
3	October 20	St. Louis	3–1	Vegas		Lehner	17,690	1–2–0	2
4	October 22	Edmonton	5–3	Vegas		Lehner	17,978	1–3–0	2
5	October 24	NY Islanders	2–0	Vegas		Lehner	17,699	1–4–0	2
6	October 26	Vegas	3–1	Colorado		Lehner	17,724	2–4–0	4
7	October 27	Vegas	3–2	Dallas	OT	Brossoit	18,114	3–4–0	6
8	October 29	Anaheim	4–5	Vegas	SO	Lehner	18,029	4–4–0	8

November: 8–5–0 (home: 5–2–0; road: 3–3–0)
#	Date	Visitor	Score	Home	OT	Decision	Attendance	Record	Pts	Recap
9	November 2	Vegas	0–4	Toronto		Lehner	18,689	4–5–0	8
10	November 4	Vegas	5–1	Ottawa		Lehner	13,211	5–5–0	10
11	November 6	Vegas	5–2	Montreal		Lehner	20,156	6–5–0	12
12	November 7	Vegas	2–5	Detroit		Brossoit	16,598	6–6–0	12
13	November 9	Seattle	2–4	Vegas		Lehner	18,246	7–6–0	14
14	November 11	Minnesota	2–3	Vegas		Brossoit	18,267	8–6–0	16
15	November 13	Vancouver	4–7	Vegas		Lehner	18,264	9–6–0	18
16	November 16	Carolina	4–2	Vegas		Lehner	17,737	9–7–0	18
17	November 18	Detroit	2–5	Vegas		Lehner	18,002	10–7–0	20
18	November 20	Columbus	2–3	Vegas		Brossoit	18,313	11–7–0	22
19	November 22	Vegas	2–5	St. Louis		Lehner	18,096	11–8–0	22
20	November 24	Vegas	5–2	Nashville		Lehner	17,174	12–8–0	24
21	November 27	Edmonton	3–2	Vegas		Lehner	18,381	12–9–0	24

December: 10–3–0 (home: 4–2–0; road: 6–1–0)
#	Date	Visitor	Score	Home	OT	Decision	Attendance	Record	Pts	Recap
22	December 1	Vegas	5–6	Anaheim		Lehner	11,902	12–10–0	24
23	December 3	Vegas	7–1	Arizona		Brossoit	12,389	13–10–0	26
24	December 5	Calgary	2–3	Vegas		Lehner	18,077	14–10–0	28
25	December 8	Dallas	4–5	Vegas		Brossoit	17,843	15–10–0	30
26	December 10	Philadelphia	4–3	Vegas		Brossoit	18,011	15–11–0	30
27	December 12	Minnesota	4–6	Vegas		Lehner	18,001	16–11–0	32
28	December 14	Vegas	4–1	Boston		Lehner	17,850	17–11–0	34
29	December 16	Vegas	5–3	New Jersey		Lehner	12,724	18–11–0	36
30	December 17	Vegas	3–2	NY Rangers	SO	Brossoit	17,400	19–11–0	38
31	December 19	Vegas	4–3	NY Islanders	SO	Lehner	17,255	20–11–0	40
32	December 21	Tampa Bay	4–3	Vegas		Brossoit	18,217	20–12–0	40
—	December 23	Los Angeles	–	Vegas	Postponed due to league-wide COVID-19 shutdown. Makeup date February 18.
—	December 27	Colorado	–	Vegas	Postponed due to league-wide COVID-19 shutdown. Makeup date February 16.
33	December 28	Vegas	6–3	Los Angeles		Brossoit	14,887	21–12–0	42
34	December 31	Anaheim	1–3	Vegas		Brossoit	18,022	22–12–0	44

January: 4–4–3 (home: 2–3–2; road: 2–1–1)
#	Date	Visitor	Score	Home	OT	Decision	Attendance	Record	Pts	Recap
35	January 2	Winnipeg	5–4	Vegas	OT	Brossoit	17,888	22–12–1	45
36	January 4	Nashville	3–2	Vegas		Thompson	17,804	22–13–1	45
37	January 6	NY Rangers	1–5	Vegas		Lehner	18,117	23–13–1	47
38	January 8	Chicago	2–1	Vegas		Lehner	18,367	23–14–1	47
39	January 11	Toronto	4–3	Vegas	SO	Lehner	17,911	23–14–2	48
—	January 14	Vegas	–	Edmonton	Postponed due to COVID-19 attendance restrictions. Makeup date February 8.
—	January 15	Vegas	–	Calgary	Postponed due to COVID-19 attendance restrictions. Makeup date February 9.
40	January 17	Pittsburgh	5–3	Vegas		Lehner	18,213	23–15–2	48
41	January 20	Montreal	3–4	Vegas	OT	Lehner	18,121	24–15–2	50
42	January 24	Vegas	1–0	Washington		Lehner	18,573	25–15–2	52
43	January 25	Vegas	3–4	Carolina	OT	Brossoit	15,228	25–15–3	53
44	January 27	Vegas	1–4	Florida		Lehner	15,400	25–16–3	53
45	January 29	Vegas	3–2	Tampa Bay	SO	Lehner	19,092	26–16–3	55

February: 3–4–1 (home: 1–2–1; road: 2–2–0)
#	Date	Visitor	Score	Home	OT	Decision	Attendance	Record	Pts	Recap
46	February 1	Buffalo	2–5	Vegas		Lehner	18,235	27–16–3	57
47	February 8	Vegas	4–0	Edmonton		Brossoit	9,150 (Note: 50% capacity due to COVID-19 restrictions.)	28–16–3	59
48	February 9	Vegas	0–6	Calgary		Lehner	9,639	28–17–3	59
49	February 16	Colorado	2–0	Vegas		Brossoit	18,209	28–18–3	59
50	February 18	Los Angeles	4–3	Vegas	OT	Brossoit	18,238	28–18–4	60
51	February 20	Vegas	4–1	San Jose		Thompson	11,504	29–18–4	62
52	February 25	Vegas	1–3	Arizona		Brossoit	11,934	29–19–4	62
53	February 26	Colorado	3–2	Vegas		Brossoit	18,333	29–20–4	62

March: 8–8–0 (home: 6–1–0; road: 2–7–0)
#	Date	Visitor	Score	Home	OT	Decision	Attendance	Record	Pts	Recap
54	March 1	San Jose	1–3	Vegas		Lehner	17,819	30–20–4	64
55	March 3	Boston	5–2	Vegas		Lehner	18,109	30–21–4	64
56	March 4	Vegas	5–4	Anaheim		Brossoit	12,586	31–21–4	66
57	March 6	Ottawa	1–2	Vegas		Lehner	17,909	32–21–4	68
58	March 8	Vegas	1–2	Philadelphia		Lehner	14,482	32–22–4	68
59	March 10	Vegas	1–3	Buffalo		Brossoit	12,437	32–23–4	68
60	March 11	Vegas	2–5	Pittsburgh		Brossoit	18,341	32–24–4	68
61	March 13	Vegas	4–6	Columbus		Thompson	16,087	32–25–4	68
62	March 15	Vegas	3–7	Winnipeg		Brossoit	13,470	32–26–4	68
63	March 17	Florida	3–5	Vegas		Thompson	18,265	33–26–4	70
64	March 19	Los Angeles	1–5	Vegas		Thompson	18,136	34–26–4	72
65	March 21	Vegas	0–3	Minnesota		Thompson	17,498	34–27–4	72
66	March 22	Vegas	0–4	Winnipeg		Thompson	13,690	34–28–4	72
67	March 24	Nashville	1–6	Vegas		Thompson	18,021	35–28–4	74
68	March 26	Chicago	4–5	Vegas	OT	Thompson	18,301	36–28–4	76
69	March 30	Vegas	3–0	Seattle		Thompson	17,151	37–28–4	78

April: 6–3–4 (home: 2–2–1; road: 4–1–3)
#	Date	Visitor	Score	Home	OT	Decision	Attendance	Record	Pts	Recap
70	April 1	Vegas	5–2	Seattle		Thompson	17,151	38–28–4	80
71	April 3	Vegas	3–2	Vancouver	OT	Lehner	18,969	39–28–4	82
72	April 6	Vancouver	5–1	Vegas		Lehner	18,113	39–29–4	82
73	April 9	Arizona	1–6	Vegas		Lehner	18,123	40–29–4	84
74	April 12	Vegas	4–5	Vancouver	OT	Lehner	18,717	40–29–5	85
75	April 14	Vegas	6–1	Calgary		Thompson	17,070	41–29–5	87
76	April 16	Vegas	0–4	Edmonton		Thompson	17,757	41–30–5	87
77	April 18	New Jersey	3–2	Vegas		Lehner	18,077	41–31–5	87
78	April 20	Washington	3–4	Vegas	OT	Thompson	18,240	42–31–5	89
79	April 24	San Jose	5–4	Vegas	SO	Thompson	18,367	42–31–6	90
80	April 26	Vegas	2–3	Dallas	SO	Thompson	18,532	42–31–7	91
81	April 27	Vegas	3–4	Chicago	SO	Thompson	19,660	42–31–8	92
82	April 29	Vegas	7–4	St. Louis		Thompson	18,096	43–31–8	94

Legend: Win (2 points) Loss (0 points) Overtime/shootout loss (1 point) Postponement

== Player statistics ==
Updated to games played April 29, 2022

=== Skaters ===
Regular season
Player	GP	G	A	Pts	+/−	PIM
Jonathan Marchessault	76	30	36	66	+3	36
Chandler Stephenson	79	21	43	64	+5	26
Shea Theodore	78	14	38	52	+6	24
Alex Pietrangelo	80	13	31	44	+7	42
Evgenii Dadonov	78	20	23	43	+4	18
Nicolas Roy	78	15	24	39	+12	51
Reilly Smith	56	16	22	38	+4	8
Max Pacioretty	39	19	18	37	+8	33
William Karlsson	67	12	23	35	+3	10
Mark Stone	37	9	21	30	+7	8
Jack Eichel	34	14	11	25	+3	10
Mattias Janmark	67	9	16	25	+3	21
Keegan Kolesar	77	7	17	24	–6	68
William Carrier	63	9	11	20	+7	34
Brett Howden	47	9	11	20	+9	12
Zach Whitecloud	59	8	11	19	+21	20
Michael Amadio^{†}	53	11	7	18	0	15
Brayden McNabb	69	3	15	18	+10	42
Nicolas Hague	52	4	10	14	+6	38
Ben Hutton	58	3	10	13	+7	32
Dylan Coghlan	59	3	10	13	−5	18
Alec Martinez	26	3	5	8	+6	4
Nolan Patrick	25	2	5	7	+1	6
Jake Leschyshyn	41	2	4	6	–2	8
Jonas Rondbjerg	30	2	4	6	0	4
Adam Brooks^{†‡}	7	2	0	2	+3	2
Paul Cotter	7	2	0	2	+1	6
Derrick Pouliot^{‡}	2	0	1	1	0	2
Daniil Miromanov	11	0	1	1	0	2
Sven Baertschi	1	0	0	0	−1	0
Ben Jones	2	0	0	0	0	2
Brayden Pachal	2	0	0	0	−2	0
Peyton Krebs^{‡}	9	0	0	0	−6	2
Kaedan Korczak	1	0	0	0	+1	0
Pavel Dorofeyev	2	0	0	0	–1	2
Zack Hayes	3	0	0	0	−2	0

=== Goaltenders ===
Regular season
Player	GP	GS	TOI	W	L	OT	GA	GAA	SA	SV%	SO	G	A	PIM
Robin Lehner	44	44	2,546:39	23	17	2	120	2.83	1,288	.907	1	0	1	10
Laurent Brossoit	24	21	1,281:23	10	9	3	62	2.90	588	.895	1	0	0	0
Logan Thompson	19	17	1,097:44	10	5	3	49	2.68	569	.914	1	0	0	0

^{†}Denotes player spent time with another team before joining the Golden Knights. Stats reflect time with the Golden Knights only.
^{‡}Denotes player was traded or waived mid-season. Stats reflect time with the Golden Knights only.
Bold/italics denotes franchise record.

== Transactions ==
The Golden Knights have been involved in the following transactions during the 2021–22 season.

=== Trades ===
Date	Details		Ref
July 24, 2021	To Detroit Red Wings NJD 2nd-round pick in 2021	To Vegas Golden Knights 2nd-round pick in 2021; TBL 4th-round pick in 2021	
July 27, 2021	To Chicago Blackhawks Marc-Andre Fleury	To Vegas Golden Knights Mikael Hakkarainen	
July 28, 2021	To Ottawa Senators Nick Holden; VAN 3rd-round pick in 2022	To Vegas Golden Knights Evgenii Dadonov	
July 29, 2021	To New York Rangers Ryan Reaves	To Vegas Golden Knights 3rd-round pick in 2022	
November 4, 2021	To Buffalo Sabres Peyton Krebs; Alex Tuch; Conditional 1st-round pick in 2022 or 2023; Conditional 2nd-round pick in 2023 or 2024	To Vegas Golden Knights Jack Eichel; Conditional 3rd-round pick in 2023 or 2024	
June 16, 2022	To Montreal Canadiens Evgenii Dadonov	To Vegas Golden Knights Shea Weber	

==== Voided trade ====
On March 21, 2022, the date of the NHL's trade deadline, the Golden Knights attempted to trade forward Evgenii Dadonov and a 2nd-round pick to the Anaheim Ducks in exchange for defenseman John Moore and the contract of retired forward Ryan Kesler. However, the trade was voided by the NHL on March 23, as Dadonov's limited no-trade clause had not been complied with.

=== Players acquired ===
Date	Player	Former team	Term	Via	Ref
July 28, 2021	Sven Baertschi	Vancouver Canucks	1-year	Free agency	
July 28, 2021	Laurent Brossoit	Winnipeg Jets	2-year	Free agency	
October 28, 2021	Ben Hutton	Toronto Maple Leafs	1-year	Free agency	
October 30, 2021	Michael Amadio	Toronto Maple Leafs		Waivers	
November 17, 2021	Adam Brooks	Montreal Canadiens		Waivers	
March 17, 2022	Derrick Pouliot	Henderson Silver Knights (AHL)	1-year	Free agency	

=== Players lost ===
Date	Player	New team	Term	Via	Ref
July 28, 2021	Carl Dahlstrom	Toronto Maple Leafs	1-year	Free agency	
July 28, 2021	Tomas Nosek	Boston Bruins	2-year	Free agency	
July 28, 2021	Jimmy Schuldt	Buffalo Sabres	1-year	Free agency	
July 29, 2021	Danny O'Regan	Anaheim Ducks	2-year	Free agency	
July 29, 2021	Dylan Sikura	Colorado Avalanche	1-year	Free agency	
August 10, 2021	Tyrell Goulbourne	Belleville Senators (AHL)	1-year	Free agency	
August 18, 2021	Mikael Hakkarainen			Mutual termination	
August 20, 2021	Mikael Hakkarainen	TPS (Liiga)	1-year	Free agency	
September 17, 2021	Reid Duke	Henderson Silver Knights (AHL)	1-year	Free agency	
October 11, 2021	Patrick Brown	Philadelphia Flyers		Waivers	
November 3, 2021	Tomas Jurco	Barys Nur-Sultan (KHL)	1-year	Free agency	
January 11, 2022	Lucas Elvenes	Anaheim Ducks		Waivers	
February 16, 2022	Adam Brooks	Toronto Maple Leafs		Waivers	
March 21, 2022	Derrick Pouliot	Seattle Kraken		Waivers	
May 11, 2022	Sven Baertschi	SC Bern (NL)	3-year	Free agency	

=== Signings ===
Date	Player	Term	Contract type	Ref
July 28, 2021	Patrick Brown	2-year	Re-signing	
July 28, 2021	Mattias Janmark	1-year	Re-signing	
July 28, 2021	Alec Martinez	3-year	Re-signing	
July 28, 2021	Gage Quinney	1-year	Re-signing	
September 16, 2021	Dylan Coghlan	2-year	Re-signing	
September 19, 2021	Nolan Patrick	2-year	Re-signing	
September 26, 2021	Daniil Chayka	3-year	Entry-level	
October 28, 2021	Zach Whitecloud	6-year	Extension	
December 2, 2021	Zach Dean	3-year	Entry-level	
January 30, 2022	Michael Amadio	2-year	Extension	
January 30, 2022	Brayden McNabb	3-year	Extension	
January 30, 2022	Logan Thompson	3-year	Extension	
March 5, 2022	Ben Hutton	2-year	Extension	
March 18, 2022	Isaiah Saville	3-year	Entry-level	
April 26, 2022	Ivan Morozov	2-year	Entry-level	
April 30, 2022	Brendan Brisson	3-year	Entry-level	
June 21, 2022	Daniil Miromanov	2-year	Extension	

== Draft picks ==
Below are the Vegas Golden Knights' selections at the 2021 NHL entry draft, which were held on July 23 to 24, 2021. It was held virtually via Video conference call from the NHL Network studio in Secaucus, New Jersey.

Round	#	Player	Pos.	Nationality	Team (League)
1	30	Zach Dean	C	Canada	Gatineau Olympiques (QMJHL)
2	38	Daniil Chayka	D	Russia	CSKA Moscow (KHL)
4	102	Jakub Brabenec	C	Czech Republic	HC Kometa Brno (ELH)
4	128	Jakub Demek	C	Slovakia	HC Kosice (Slovak Extraliga)
6	190	Artur Cholach	D	Ukraine	Sokil Kyiv (PHL)
7	222	Carl Lindbom	G	Sweden	Djurgardens IF (J20 SuperElit)
