= 2021–22 New Jersey Devils season =

National Hockey League season

2021–22 New Jersey Devils
- Division: 7th Metropolitan
- Conference: 14th Eastern
- 2021–22 record: 27–46–9
- Home record: 16–20–5
- Road record: 11–26–4
- Goals for: 248
- Goals against: 307

Team information
- General manager: Tom Fitzgerald
- Coach: Lindy Ruff
- Captain: Nico Hischier
- Alternate captains: Dougie Hamilton; Damon Severson; Miles Wood
- Arena: Prudential Center
- Average attendance: 12,744
- Minor league affiliates: Utica Comets (AHL); Adirondack Thunder (ECHL)

Team leaders
- Goals: Jesper Bratt; Jack Hughes (26)
- Assists: Jesper Bratt (47)
- Points: Jesper Bratt (73)
- Penalty minutes: P. K. Subban (82)
- Plus/minus: Fabian Zetterlund (+5)
- Wins: Nico Daws (10)
- Goals against average: Jonathan Bernier (3.06)

The 2021–22 New Jersey Devils season was the 48th season for the National Hockey League (NHL) franchise that was established on June 11, 1974, and 40th season since the franchise relocated from Colorado prior to the 1982–83 NHL season. Before the season, the Devils lost Nathan Bastian to the Seattle Kraken in the 2021 NHL expansion draft, but reacquired him in on November 25, 2021.

On March 31, 2022, following an 8–1 loss to the Boston Bruins, the Devils were eliminated from playoff contention for the fourth consecutive season.

== Standings ==
=== Divisional standings ===
Metropolitan Division
Pos	Team	GP	W	L	OTL	RW	GF	GA	GD	Pts
1	y – Carolina Hurricanes	82	54	20	8	47	278	202	+76	116
2	x – New York Rangers	82	52	24	6	44	254	207	+47	110
3	x – Pittsburgh Penguins	82	46	25	11	37	272	229	+43	103
4	x – Washington Capitals	82	44	26	12	35	275	245	+30	100
5	New York Islanders	82	37	35	10	34	231	237	−6	84
6	Columbus Blue Jackets	82	37	38	7	26	262	300	−38	81
7	New Jersey Devils	82	27	46	9	19	248	307	−59	63
8	Philadelphia Flyers	82	25	46	11	20	211	298	−87	61

Source: National Hockey League
Rules for classification: 1) Fewer number of games played (GP, only during regular season); 2) Greater number of regulation wins (RW); 3) Greater number of wins in regulation and overtime, excluding shootout wins (ROW); 4) Greater number of total wins, including shootouts (W); 5) Greater number of points earned in head-to-head play; if teams played an uneven number of head-to-head games, the result of the first game on the home ice of the team with the extra home game is discarded; 6) Greater goal differential (GD); 7) Greater number of goals scored (GF)
x – Clinched playoff spot; y – Clinched division

=== Conference standings ===
Eastern Conference Wild Card
Pos	Div	Team	GP	W	L	OTL	RW	GF	GA	GD	Pts
1	AT	x – Boston Bruins	82	51	26	5	40	255	220	+35	107
2	ME	x – Washington Capitals	82	44	26	12	35	275	245	+30	100
3	ME	New York Islanders	82	37	35	10	34	231	237	−6	84
4	ME	Columbus Blue Jackets	82	37	38	7	26	262	300	−38	81
5	AT	Buffalo Sabres	82	32	39	11	25	232	290	−58	75
6	AT	Detroit Red Wings	82	32	40	10	21	230	312	−82	74
7	AT	Ottawa Senators	82	33	42	7	26	227	266	−39	73
8	ME	New Jersey Devils	82	27	46	9	19	248	307	−59	63
9	ME	Philadelphia Flyers	82	25	46	11	20	211	298	−87	61
10	AT	Montreal Canadiens	82	22	49	11	16	221	319	−98	55

Source: National Hockey League
Rules for classification: 1) Fewer number of games played (GP, only during regular season); 2) Greater number of regulation wins (RW); 3) Greater number of wins in regulation and overtime, excluding shootout wins (ROW); 4) Greater number of total wins, including shootouts (W); 5) Greater number of points earned in head-to-head play; if teams played an uneven number of head-to-head games, the result of the first game on the home ice of the team with the extra home game is discarded; 6) Greater goal differential (GD); 7) Greater number of goals scored (GF)
x – Clinched playoff spot

== Schedule and results ==
=== Preseason ===
The preseason schedule was published on July 27, 2021. The Devils' game against the New York Islanders on October 7, 2021, was cancelled due to a power outage at Prudential Center in Newark, New Jersey.

2021 preseason game log: 4–1–0 (home: 2–0–0; road: 2–1–0)
#	Date	Visitor	Score	Home	OT	Decision	Attendance	Record	Recap
1	September 29	New Jersey	5–4	Washington		Daws	13,012	1–0–0
2	October 1	NY Rangers	1–7	New Jersey		Bernier	10,474	2–0–0
3^{[a]}	October 2	New Jersey	2–1	NY Islanders	OT	Wedgewood	—	3–0–0
4	October 4	Washington	1–4	New Jersey		Blackwood	4,563	4–0–0
5	October 6	New Jersey	2–6	NY Rangers		Bernier	10,468	4–1–0
—	October 7	NY Islanders	–	New Jersey	Cancelled due to a power outage at the arena
Notes:^{a} Game was played at Webster Bank Arena in Bridgeport, Connecticut.

=== Regular season ===
The regular season schedule was published on July 22, 2021, with only about a handful of games scheduled in February because NHL players were planning to participate in the 2022 Winter Olympics. However, on December 22, the NHL announced that its players would not participate in the 2022 Winter Olympics due to the ongoing COVID-19 pandemic.

2021–22 game log

October: 4–2–1 (home: 3–2–1; road: 1–0–0)
#	Date	Visitor	Score	Home	OT	Decision	Attendance	Record	Pts	Recap
1	October 15	Chicago	3–4	New Jersey	OT	Bernier	16,514	1–0–0	2
2	October 19	Seattle	2–4	New Jersey		Bernier	13,806	2–0–0	4
3	October 21	Washington	4–1	New Jersey		Wedgewood	12,377	2–1–0	4
4	October 23	Buffalo	1–2	New Jersey	OT	Daws	13,158	3–1–0	6
5	October 26	Calgary	5–3	New Jersey		Wedgewood	10,631	3–2–0	6
6	October 30	New Jersey	4–2	Pittsburgh		Bernier	17,452	4–2–0	8
7	October 31	Columbus	4–3	New Jersey	SO	Wedgewood	10,239	4–2–1	9

November: 5–5–3 (home: 3–2–1; road: 2–3–2)
#	Date	Visitor	Score	Home	OT	Decision	Attendance	Record	Pts	Recap
8	November 2	New Jersey	0–4	Anaheim		Bernier	13,252	4–3–1	9
9	November 5	New Jersey	2–3	Los Angeles	OT	Blackwood	16,045	4–3–2	10
10	November 6	New Jersey	3–2	San Jose	SO	Bernier	12,019	5–3–2	12
11	November 9	Florida	3–7	New Jersey		Blackwood	10,627	6–3–2	14
12	November 11	NY Islanders	0–4	New Jersey		Blackwood	13,816	7–3–2	16
13	November 13	Boston	5–2	New Jersey		Bernier	16,514	7–4–2	16
14	November 14	New Jersey	3–4	NY Rangers	SO	Bernier	16,130	7–4–3	17
—	November 16	New Jersey	–	Ottawa	Postponed due to COVID-19 protocol; moved to December 6
15	November 18	New Jersey	1–4	Florida		Blackwood	12,157	7–5–3	17
16	November 20	New Jersey	5–3	Tampa Bay		Blackwood	19,092	8–5–3	19
17	November 24	Minnesota	3–2	New Jersey	SO	Blackwood	14,763	8–5–4	20
18	November 26	New Jersey	2–4	Nashville		Bernier	17,159	8–6–4	20
19	November 28	Philadelphia	2–5	New Jersey		Blackwood	13,113	9–6–4	22
20	November 30	San Jose	5–2	New Jersey		Blackwood	13,492	9–7–4	22

December: 3–8–1 (home: 2–3–1; road: 1–5–0)
#	Date	Visitor	Score	Home	OT	Decision	Attendance	Record	Pts	Recap
21	December 2	New Jersey	2–5	Minnesota		Blackwood	16,112	9–8–4	22
22	December 3	New Jersey	4–8	Winnipeg		Bernier	13,844	9–9–4	22
23	December 6	Ottawa	3–2	New Jersey	SO	Blackwood	10,312	9–9–5	23
24	December 8	Philadelphia	0–3	New Jersey		Blackwood	12,163	10–9–5	25
25	December 10	Nashville	3–2	New Jersey		Blackwood	14,218	10–10–5	25
26	December 11	New Jersey	2–4	NY Islanders		Schmid	17,255	10–11–5	25
27	December 14	New Jersey	1–6	Philadelphia		Blackwood	18,594	10–12–5	25
28	December 16	Vegas	5–3	New Jersey		Blackwood	12,724	10–13–5	25
29	December 18	New Jersey	2–5	Detroit		Schmid	19,015	10–14–5	25
30	December 19	Pittsburgh	3–2	New Jersey		Gillies	14,857	10–15–5	25
—	December 21	New Jersey	–	Pittsburgh	Postponed due to COVID-19 protocol; moved to February 24
—	December 23	Montreal	–	New Jersey	Postponed due to COVID-19 protocol; moved to April 7
—	December 27	New Jersey	–	St. Louis	Postponed due to COVID-19 protocol; moved to February 10
31	December 29	New Jersey	4–3	Buffalo		Blackwood	11,511	11–15–5	27
32	December 31	Edmonton	5–6	New Jersey	OT	Blackwood	13,044	12–15–5	29

January: 3–9–0 (home: 2–3–0; road: 1–6–0)
#	Date	Visitor	Score	Home	OT	Decision	Attendance	Record	Pts	Recap
33	January 2	New Jersey	4–3	Washington	OT	Blackwood	18,573	13–15–5	31
34	January 4	New Jersey	3–5	Boston		Blackwood	17,850	13–16–5	31
35	January 6	Columbus	1–3	New Jersey		Blackwood	11,523	14–16–5	33
36	January 8	New Jersey	3–4	Columbus		Blackwood	18,680	14–17–5	33
—	January 10	Tampa Bay	–	New Jersey	Postponed due to COVID-19 protocol; moved to February 15
37	January 13	New Jersey	2–3	NY Islanders		Gillies	17,255	14–18–5	33
—	January 15	New Jersey	–	Montreal	Postponed due to COVID-19 protocol; moved to February 8
—	January 17	New Jersey	–	Toronto	Postponed due to COVID-19 protocol; move to January 31
38	January 19	Arizona	4–1	New Jersey		Blackwood	10,592	14–19–5	33
39	January 22	Carolina	4–7	New Jersey		Gillies	13,657	15–19–5	35
40	January 23	Los Angeles	3–2	New Jersey		Gillies	11,354	15–20–5	35
41	January 25	Dallas	5–1	New Jersey		Schmid	10,382	15–21–5	35
42	January 27	New Jersey	2–3	Tampa Bay		Gillies	19,092	15–22–5	35
43	January 29	New Jersey	1–2	Carolina		Gillies	18,956	15–23–5	35
44	January 31	New Jersey	4–6	Toronto		Schmid	500	15–24–5	35

February: 4–5–0 (home: 1–3–0; road: 3–2–0)
#	Date	Visitor	Score	Home	OT	Decision	Attendance	Record	Pts	Recap
45	February 1	Toronto	7–1	New Jersey		Gillies	11,602	15–25–5	35
46	February 7	New Jersey	1–4	Ottawa		Daws	500	15–26–5	35
47	February 8	New Jersey	7–1	Montreal		Gillies	500	16–26–5	37
48	February 10	New Jersey	7–4	St. Louis		Gillies	18,096	17–26–5	39
49	February 13	Pittsburgh	4–2	New Jersey		Gillies	11,242	17–27–5	39
50	February 15	Tampa Bay	6–3	New Jersey		Gillies	10,410	17–28–5	39
51	February 24	New Jersey	6–1	Pittsburgh		Daws	18,057	18–28–5	41
52	February 25	New Jersey	5–8	Chicago		Gillies	19,343	18–29–5	41
53	February 28	Vancouver	2–7	New Jersey		Daws	11,693	19–29–5	43

March: 5–9–0 (home: 5–1–0; road: 0–8–0)
#	Date	Visitor	Score	Home	OT	Decision	Attendance	Record	Pts	Recap
54	March 1	New Jersey	3–4	Columbus		Daws	13,678	19–30–5	43
55	March 4	New Jersey	1–3	NY Rangers		Daws	18,006	19–31–5	43
56	March 6	St. Louis	2–3	New Jersey	OT	Daws	14,923	20–31–5	45
57	March 8	Colorado	3–5	New Jersey		Daws	12,181	21–31–5	47
58	March 10	Winnipeg	2–1	New Jersey		Daws	12,377	21–32–5	47
59	March 12	Anaheim	1–2	New Jersey	SO	Daws	14,783	22–32–5	49
60	March 15	New Jersey	3–6	Vancouver		Daws	18,562	22–33–5	49
61	March 16	New Jersey	3–6	Calgary		Daws	15,488	22–34–5	49
62	March 19	New Jersey	3–6	Edmonton		Gillies	16,950	22–35–5	49
63	March 22	NY Rangers	4–7	New Jersey		Daws	16,514	23–35–5	51
64	March 23	New Jersey	2–3	Toronto		Daws	18,739	23–36–5	51
65	March 26	New Jersey	3–4	Washington		Daws	18,573	23–37–5	51
66	March 27	Montreal	2–3	New Jersey	SO	Daws	12,080	24–37–5	53
67	March 31	New Jersey	1–8	Boston		Daws	17,850	24–38–5	53

April: 3–8–4 (home: 0–6–2; road: 3–2–2)
#	Date	Visitor	Score	Home	OT	Decision	Attendance	Record	Pts	Recap
68	April 2	Florida	7–6	New Jersey	OT	Hammond	12,284	24–38–6	54
69	April 3	NY Islanders	4–3	New Jersey		Daws	14,620	24–39–6	54
70	April 5	NY Rangers	3–1	New Jersey		Daws	15,020	24–40–6	54
71	April 7	Montreal	7–4	New Jersey		Hammond	10,435	24–41–6	54
72	April 9	New Jersey	3–1	Dallas		Daws	18,127	25–41–6	56
73	April 12	New Jersey	6–2	Arizona		Daws	8,679	26–41–6	58
74	April 14	New Jersey	1–3	Colorado		Hammond	18,024	26–42–6	58
75	April 16	New Jersey	3–4	Seattle	SO	Daws	17,151	26–42–7	59
76	April 18	New Jersey	3–2	Vegas		Hammond	18,077	27–42–7	61
77	April 21	Buffalo	5–2	New Jersey		Hammond	12,014	27–43–7	61
78	April 23	Carolina	3–2	New Jersey	OT	Gillies	10,376	27–43–8	62
79	April 24	Detroit	3–0	New Jersey		Hammond	11,492	27–44–8	62
80	April 26	New Jersey	4–5	Ottawa	OT	Blackwood	13,101	27–44–9	63
81	April 28	New Jersey	3–6	Carolina		Hammond	18,040	27–45–9	63
82	April 29	Detroit	5–3	New Jersey		Blackwood	14,597	27–46–9	63

Legend: Win (2 points) Loss (0 points) Overtime/shootout loss (1 point)

== Player statistics ==
As of May 1, 2022

=== Skaters ===
Regular season
Player	GP	G	A	Pts	+/−	PIM
Jesper Bratt	76	26	47	73	0	16
Nico Hischier	70	21	39	60	–1	17
Jack Hughes	49	26	30	56	–16	0
Yegor Sharangovich	76	24	22	46	–14	23
Damon Severson	80	11	35	46	–14	57
Dawson Mercer	82	17	25	42	–25	28
Pavel Zacha	70	15	21	36	–21	22
Andreas Johnsson	71	13	22	35	+4	30
Tomáš Tatar	76	15	15	30	–22	22
Dougie Hamilton	62	9	21	30	–19	34
Ryan Graves	75	6	22	28	–9	24
Jesper Boqvist	56	10	13	23	–9	10
P. K. Subban	77	5	17	22	–8	82
Michael McLeod	77	6	14	20	–13	52
Ty Smith	66	5	15	20	–26	22
Janne Kuokkanen	57	6	11	17	–10	10
Nathan Bastian^{†}	60	11	5	16	–11	34
Jimmy Vesey	68	8	7	15	–24	12
Jonas Siegenthaler	70	1	13	14	–5	42
Fabian Zetterlund	14	3	5	8	+5	0
Nolan Foote	7	3	1	4	+3	0
Kevin Bahl	17	1	3	4	–6	10
Colton White	27	0	4	4	+2	8
A. J. Greer	9	1	1	2	0	2
Nikita Okhotiuk	5	1	1	2	–2	2
Alexander Holtz	9	0	2	2	–5	2
Marián Studenič	17	1	0	1	–6	0
Reilly Walsh	1	0	1	1	0	0
Mason Geertsen	25	0	0	0	–6	77
Miles Wood	3	0	0	0	–2	4
Frédérik Gauthier	8	0	0	0	–1	0
Chase De Leo	2	0	0	0	–1	0
Christián Jaroš	11	0	0	0	–4	2
Tyce Thompson	2	0	0	0	0	0

=== Goaltenders ===
Regular season
Player	GP	GS	TOI	W	L	OT	GA	GAA	SA	SV%	SO	G	A	PIM
Nico Daws	25	23	1,271:32	10	11	1	66	3.11	617	.893	0	0	0	0
Mackenzie Blackwood	25	24	1,399:03	9	10	4	79	3.39	731	.892	2	0	0	0
Jonathan Bernier	10	8	510:06	4	4	1	26	3.06	264	.902	0	0	0	0
Jon Gillies^{†}	19	14	940:59	3	10	1	59	3.76	511	.885	0	0	1	0
Andrew Hammond^{†}	7	7	386:18	1	5	1	30	4.66	214	.860	0	0	0	0
Scott Wedgewood	3	2	169:26	0	2	1	9	3.19	75	.880	0	0	0	0
Akira Schmid	6	4	235:59	0	4	0	19	4.83	114	.833	0	0	0	0

- ^{†} Denotes player spent time with another team before joining the Devils. Stats reflect time with the Devils only.
- ^{‡} Denotes player was traded mid-season. Stats reflect time with the Devils only.
- Bold/italics denotes franchise record.

== Awards and honors ==
=== Awards ===
Regular season
Player	Award	Date
P. K. Subban	King Clancy Memorial Trophy	June 7, 2022

== Transactions ==
The Devils have been involved in the following transactions during the 2021–22 season.

=== Trades ===
Date	Details		Ref
July 15, 2021	To Colorado Avalanche Mikhail Maltsev; NYI's 2nd-round pick in 2021	To New Jersey Devils Ryan Graves	
July 26, 2021	To San Jose Sharks Nick Merkley	To New Jersey Devils Christián Jaroš	
July 28, 2021	To Buffalo Sabres Will Butcher; 5th-round pick in 2022	To New Jersey Devils Future considerations	
December 15, 2021	To St. Louis Blues Future considerations	To New Jersey Devils Jon Gillies	
March 21, 2022	To Montreal Canadiens Nate Schnarr	To New Jersey Devils Andrew Hammond	

=== Free agents ===
Date	Player	Team	Contract term	Ref
July 28, 2021	Jonathan Bernier	from Detroit Red Wings	2-year	
July 28, 2021	Aaron Dell	to Buffalo Sabres	1-year	
July 28, 2021	Dougie Hamilton	from Carolina Hurricanes	7-year	
July 28, 2021	Matt Tennyson	to Nashville Predators	2-year	
July 29, 2021	Brandon Gignac	to Laval Rocket (AHL)	1-year	
July 29, 2021	Chase De Leo	from Anaheim Ducks	1-year	
July 29, 2021	Brian Flynn	from HC Ambrì-Piotta (NL)	1-year	
July 29, 2021	Joe Gambardella	from Edmonton Oilers (Note: Was under contract with the Oilers, but played for their AHL affiliate during the 2020–21 season.)	2-year	
July 29, 2021	Robbie Russo	from San Jose Barracuda (AHL)	2-year	
July 29, 2021	Brett Seney	to Toronto Maple Leafs	1-year	
August 2, 2021	Ryan Murray	to Colorado Avalanche	1-year	
August 2, 2021	Ben Street	to EHC Red Bull München (DEL)	1-year	
August 4, 2021	Connor Carrick	to Seattle Kraken	1-year	
August 4, 2021	Josh Jacobs	to Carolina Hurricanes	1-year	
August 5, 2021	Tomáš Tatar	from Montreal Canadiens	2-year	
August 6, 2021	Mason Jobst	to Rochester Americans (AHL)	1-year	
October 8, 2021	Frédérik Gauthier	from Arizona Coyotes	1-year	
October 10, 2021	Jimmy Vesey	from Vancouver Canucks	1-year	
October 13, 2021	Evan Cormier	to Newfoundland Growlers (ECHL)	1-year	
March 27, 2022	Brian Halonen	from Michigan Tech Huskies (CCHA)	2-year	

=== Waivers ===
Date	Player	Team	Ref
October 3, 2021	Mason Geertsen	from New York Rangers	
November 4, 2021	Scott Wedgewood	to Arizona Coyotes	
November 25, 2021	Nathan Bastian	from Seattle Kraken	
February 24, 2021	Marián Studenič	to Dallas Stars	

=== Contract terminations ===
Date	Player	Via	Ref
March 24, 2022	Christián Jaroš	Mutual termination	

=== Signings ===
Date	Player	Contract term	Ref
July 9, 2021	Jonas Siegenthaler	2-year	
July 14, 2021	Colton White	1-year	
July 15, 2021	Michael McLeod	2-year	
July 26, 2021	Christián Jaroš	1-year	
August 4, 2021	A. J. Greer	1-year	
August 4, 2021	Marián Studenič	1-year	
August 5, 2021	Yegor Sharangovich	2-year	
August 9, 2021	Janne Kuokkanen	2-year	
August 20, 2021	Chase Stillman	3-year	
November 30, 2021	Jack Hughes	8-year	
December 1, 2021	Shakir Mukhamadullin	3-year	
May 12, 2022	Topias Vilén	3-year	

== Draft picks ==
Below are the New Jersey Devils' selections at the 2021 NHL entry draft, which was held on July 23 and 24, 2021, in a remote format, with teams convening via videoconferencing, and Commissioner Gary Bettman announcing selections from the NHL Network studios in Secaucus, New Jersey.

Round	#	Player	Pos	Nationality	College/junior/club team
1	4	Luke Hughes	D	United States	U.S. NTDP (USHL)
1	29^{1}	Chase Stillman	RW	Canada	Esbjerg Energy U20 (DNK U20)
3	68	Samu Salminen	C	Finland	Jokerit U20 (U20 SM-sarja)
4	100	Jakub Málek	G	Czech Republic	VHK Vsetín (Chance Liga)
5	129^{2}	Topias Vilén	D	Finland	Lahti Pelicans (Liiga)
6	164	Viktor Hurtig	D	Sweden	Västerås IK J20 (J20 Nationell)
7	203^{3}	Zakhar Bardakov	C	Russia	HC Vityaz (KHL)

1. The New York Islanders' first-round pick went to the New Jersey Devils as the result of a trade on April 7, 2021, that sent Kyle Palmieri and Travis Zajac to New York in exchange for A. J. Greer, Mason Jobst, a conditional 2022 fourth-round pick and this pick.
2. The Buffalo Sabres' fifth-round pick went to the New Jersey Devils as the result of a trade on February 24, 2020, that sent Wayne Simmonds to Buffalo in exchange for this pick (being conditional at the time of the trade).
3. The Arizona Coyotes' seventh-round pick went to the New Jersey Devils as the result of a trade on October 7, 2020, that sent a 2020 seventh-round pick (192nd overall) to Arizona in exchange for this pick.
