= 2021–22 Ottawa Senators season =

Season of professional ice hockey team

2021–22 Ottawa Senators
- Division: 7th Atlantic
- Conference: 13th Eastern
- 2021–22 record: 33–42–7
- Home record: 15–22–4
- Road record: 18–20–3
- Goals for: 227
- Goals against: 266

Team information
- General manager: Pierre Dorion
- Coach: D. J. Smith
- Captain: Vacant (Oct 15 – Nov. 5); Brady Tkachuk (Nov. 5 – Apr. 29)
- Alternate captains: Connor Brown; Thomas Chabot; Brady Tkachuk (Oct–Nov); Nick Paul (Oct–Mar); Nikita Zaitsev
- Arena: Canadian Tire Centre
- Average attendance: 10,145
- Minor league affiliates: Belleville Senators (AHL); Atlanta Gladiators (ECHL)

Team leaders
- Goals: Josh Norris (35)
- Assists: Brady Tkachuk (37)
- Points: Brady Tkachuk (67)
- Penalty minutes: Brady Tkachuk (117)
- Plus/minus: Mathieu Joseph (+8)
- Wins: Anton Forsberg (22)
- Goals against average: Anton Forsberg (2.82)

The 2021–22 Ottawa Senators season was the 30th season of the Ottawa Senators of the National Hockey League (NHL). The Senators attempted to return to the Stanley Cup playoffs after failing to qualify for the past four seasons. The Senators returned to the Atlantic Division after playing in the North Division in 2020–21.

On April 6, 2022, the Senators were eliminated from playoff contention when the Washington Capitals defeated the Tampa Bay Lightning.

== Team business ==
In July 2021, the team hired Pierre McGuire as senior vice president of player development. McGuire, who had most recently been a broadcaster with the NHL on NBC, had previously been an assistant coach with the Senators. In August 2021, the Senators announced their new ECHL affiliation with the Atlanta Gladiators.

Owner Eugene Melnyk died on March 28, 2022, due to an unspecified illness. In statements in recent years, Melnyk had said that he planned to leave the team to his two daughters Olivia and Anna, when he had been asked if he intended to sell the team, although there has been speculation about ownership changes. The team added an 'EM' patch on the jersey for the rest of the season.

In April 2022, the club announced a joint proposal with the Ottawa Sports and Entertainment Group to host the 2023 IIHF World Junior Hockey Championships in Ottawa.

The National Capital Commission (NCC) resumed the process to redevelop the LeBreton Flats overall site, reserving the site of an arena and asking for preliminary bids on the arena site separately. After a February 2022 deadline to submit bids, the NCC announced that it had received several bids for the site. Local media speculated that the Senators were actively pursuing a bid, authorized by Melnyk shortly before his death. In June 2022, the NCC accepted the Senators' proposal for a new downtown arena and mixed-use development as part of the Lebreton Flats redevelopment. The team will lease the land for their development. Construction is not expected before 2024 after a leasing agreement is finalized and municipal review of the project is completed. The lease agreement is expected to be put in place by autumn of 2023.

== Standings ==
=== Divisional standings ===
Atlantic Division
Pos	Team	GP	W	L	OTL	RW	GF	GA	GD	Pts
1	p – Florida Panthers	82	58	18	6	42	340	246	+94	122
2	x – Toronto Maple Leafs	82	54	21	7	45	315	253	+62	115
3	x – Tampa Bay Lightning	82	51	23	8	39	287	233	+54	110
4	x – Boston Bruins	82	51	26	5	40	255	220	+35	107
5	Buffalo Sabres	82	32	39	11	25	232	290	−58	75
6	Detroit Red Wings	82	32	40	10	21	230	312	−82	74
7	Ottawa Senators	82	33	42	7	26	227	266	−39	73
8	Montreal Canadiens	82	22	49	11	16	221	319	−98	55

Source: National Hockey League
Rules for classification: 1) Fewer number of games played (GP, only during regular season); 2) Greater number of regulation wins (RW); 3) Greater number of wins in regulation and overtime, excluding shootout wins (ROW); 4) Greater number of total wins, including shootouts (W); 5) Greater number of points earned in head-to-head play; if teams played an uneven number of head-to-head games, the result of the first game on the home ice of the team with the extra home game is discarded; 6) Greater goal differential (GD); 7) Greater number of goals scored (GF)
p – Clinched Presidents' Trophy; x – Clinched playoff spot

=== Conference standings ===
Eastern Conference Wild Card
Pos	Div	Team	GP	W	L	OTL	RW	GF	GA	GD	Pts
1	AT	x – Boston Bruins	82	51	26	5	40	255	220	+35	107
2	ME	x – Washington Capitals	82	44	26	12	35	275	245	+30	100
3	ME	New York Islanders	82	37	35	10	34	231	237	−6	84
4	ME	Columbus Blue Jackets	82	37	38	7	26	262	300	−38	81
5	AT	Buffalo Sabres	82	32	39	11	25	232	290	−58	75
6	AT	Detroit Red Wings	82	32	40	10	21	230	312	−82	74
7	AT	Ottawa Senators	82	33	42	7	26	227	266	−39	73
8	ME	New Jersey Devils	82	27	46	9	19	248	307	−59	63
9	ME	Philadelphia Flyers	82	25	46	11	20	211	298	−87	61
10	AT	Montreal Canadiens	82	22	49	11	16	221	319	−98	55

Source: National Hockey League
Rules for classification: 1) Fewer number of games played (GP, only during regular season); 2) Greater number of regulation wins (RW); 3) Greater number of wins in regulation and overtime, excluding shootout wins (ROW); 4) Greater number of total wins, including shootouts (W); 5) Greater number of points earned in head-to-head play; if teams played an uneven number of head-to-head games, the result of the first game on the home ice of the team with the extra home game is discarded; 6) Greater goal differential (GD); 7) Greater number of goals scored (GF)
x – Clinched playoff spot

== Schedule and results ==
=== Preseason ===
The pre-season schedule was published on July 21, 2021.

2021 preseason game log: 3–4–0 (home: 1–2–0; road: 2–2–0)
#	Date	Visitor	Score	Home	OT	Decision	Attendance	Record	Recap
1	September 26	Ottawa	3–2	Winnipeg	OT	Forsberg	—	1–0–0
2	September 29	Toronto	4–0	Ottawa		Gustavsson	—	1–1–0
3	October 1	Montreal	2–7	Ottawa		Murray	—	2–1–0
4	October 2	Ottawa	1–2	Montreal		Forsberg	7,500	2–2–0
5	October 4	Toronto	3–1	Ottawa		Murray	—	2–3–0
6	October 7	Ottawa	5–4	Montreal	SO	Forsberg	7,500	3–3–0
7	October 9	Ottawa	1–4	Toronto		Murray	—	3–4–0

=== Regular season ===
The regular season schedule was published on July 22, 2021. On November 15, the NHL announced the postponement of three Senators games due to there being ten Senators players in the League's COVID-19 protocol with "evidence of continued spread in recent days", rendering the team inactive until they were cleared to return to practice on November 20, in time to play their November 22 game hosted by the Colorado Avalanche. In the meantime, three games were postponed: at the New Jersey Devils on the 16th, against the Nashville Predators on the 18th, and against the New York Rangers on the 20th.

2021–22 game log

October: 3–4–0 (home: 2–3–0; road: 1–1–0)
#	Date	Visitor	Score	Home	OT	Decision	Attendance	Record	Pts	Recap
1	October 14	Toronto	2–3	Ottawa		Forsberg	15,159	1–0–0	2
2	October 16	Ottawa	1–3	Toronto		Forsberg	18,211	1–1–0	2
3	October 17	Dallas	2–3	Ottawa		Gustavsson	8,067	2–1–0	4
4	October 21	San Jose	2–1	Ottawa		Murray	8,994	2–2–0	4
5	October 23	NY Rangers	3–2	Ottawa		Forsberg	11,167	2–3–0	4
6	October 25	Washington	7–5	Ottawa		Gustavsson	11,387	2–4–0	4
7	October 29	Ottawa	4–1	Dallas		Gustavsson	17,346	3–4–0	6

November: 1–10–1 (home: 1–4–0; road: 0–6–1)
#	Date	Visitor	Score	Home	OT	Decision	Attendance	Record	Pts	Recap
8	November 1	Ottawa	1–5	Chicago		Murray	15,946	3–5–0	6
9	November 2	Ottawa	4–5	Minnesota	OT	Gustavsson	15,276	3–5–1	7
10	November 4	Vegas	5–1	Ottawa		Gustavsson	13,211	3–6–1	7
11	November 6	Tampa Bay	5–3	Ottawa		Murray	12,417	3–7–1	7
12	November 9	Ottawa	2–3	Boston		Murray	17,850	3–8–1	7
13	November 11	Los Angeles	2–0	Ottawa		Gustavsson	8,221	3–9–1	7
14	November 13	Pittsburgh	3–6	Ottawa		Gustavsson	14,661	4–9–1	9
15	November 14	Calgary	4–0	Ottawa		Forsberg	10,244	4–10–1	9
—	November 16	Ottawa	–	New Jersey	Postponed due to COVID-19. Moved to December 6.
—	November 18	Nashville	–	Ottawa	Postponed due to COVID-19. Moved to April 7.
—	November 20	NY Rangers	–	Ottawa	Postponed due to COVID-19. Moved to February 20.
16	November 22	Ottawa	5–7	Colorado		Gustavsson	16,706	4–11–1	9
17	November 24	Ottawa	3–6	San Jose		Murray	10,076	4–12–1	9
18	November 26	Ottawa	0–4	Anaheim		Forsberg	14,687	4–13–1	9
19	November 27	Ottawa	2–4	Los Angeles		Gustavsson	15,406	4–14–1	9

December: 5–3–1 (home: 2–2–0; road: 3–1–1)
#	Date	Visitor	Score	Home	OT	Decision	Attendance	Record	Pts	Recap
20	December 1	Vancouver	6–2	Ottawa		Gustavsson	10,571	4–15–1	9
21	December 2	Ottawa	3–2	Carolina		Forsberg	14,915	5–15–1	11
22	December 4	Colorado	5–6	Ottawa	OT	Forsberg	14,237	6–15–1	13
23	December 6	Ottawa	3–2	New Jersey	SO	Forsberg	10,312	7–15–1	15
24	December 7	NY Islanders	5–3	Ottawa		Gustavsson	10,229	7–16–1	15
25	December 11	Tampa Bay	0–4	Ottawa		Forsberg	13,076	8–16–1	17
26	December 14	Ottawa	8–2	Florida		Forsberg	13,759	9–16–1	19
27	December 16	Ottawa	1–2	Tampa Bay		Forsberg	19,092	9–17–1	19
28	December 18	Ottawa	3–4	Philadelphia	OT	Forsberg	18,437	9–17–2	20
—	December 19	Boston	–	Ottawa	Postponed due to COVID-19. Moved to February 19.
—	December 21	St. Louis		Ottawa	Postponed due to COVID-19. Moved to February 15.
—	December 23	Carolina		Ottawa	Postponed due to COVID-19. Moved to February 8.
—	December 27	Ottawa		Washington	Postponed due to COVID-19. Moved to February 13.
—	December 29	Boston		Ottawa	Postponed due to COVID-19. Moved to February 12.
—	December 31	Pittsburgh		Ottawa	Postponed due to attendance restrictions. Moved to February 10.

January: 5–4–2 (home: 2–2–1; road: 3–2–1)
#	Date	Visitor	Score	Home	OT	Decision	Attendance	Record	Pts	Recap
29	January 1	Ottawa	0–6	Toronto		Murray	989	9–18–2	20
—	January 3	Minnesota		Ottawa	Postponed due to COVID-19. Moved to February 22.
—	January 6	Ottawa		Seattle	Postponed due to COVID-19. Moved to April 18.
—	January 8	Ottawa		Vancouver	Postponed due to attendance restrictions. Moved to April 19.
—	January 10	Ottawa		Edmonton	Postponed due to COVID-19. Moved to January 15.
30	January 13	Ottawa	4–1	Calgary		Murray	9,639	10–18–2	22
—	January 15	Ottawa		Winnipeg	Postponed due to attendance restrictions. Moved to March 24.
31	January 15	Ottawa	6–4	Edmonton		Murray	9,150	11–18–2	24
32	January 18	Buffalo	3–1	Ottawa		Forsberg	0	11–19–2	24
33	January 20	Ottawa	4–6	Pittsburgh		Gustavsson	18,060	11–20–2	24
34	January 22	Ottawa	2–3	Washington	OT	Murray	18,573	11–20–3	25
35	January 23	Ottawa	2–1	Columbus		Forsberg	15,037	12–20–3	27
36	January 25	Buffalo	0–5	Ottawa		Murray	0	13–20–3	29
37	January 27	Carolina	3–2	Ottawa	SO	Murray	0	13–20–4	30
38	January 29	Anaheim	2–1	Ottawa		Forsberg	0	13–21–4	30
39	January 31	Edmonton	2–3	Ottawa	OT	Murray	500	14–21–4	32

February: 5–6–1 (home: 3–5–1; road: 2–1–0)
#	Date	Visitor	Score	Home	OT	Decision	Attendance	Record	Pts	Recap
40	February 1	Ottawa	1–4	NY Islanders		Forsberg	15,258	14–22–4	32
41	February 7	New Jersey	1–4	Ottawa		Murray	500	15–22–4	34
42	February 8	Carolina	3–4	Ottawa		Forsberg	500	16–22–4	36
43	February 10	Pittsburgh	2–0	Ottawa		Murray	500	16–23–4	36
44	February 12	Boston	2–0	Ottawa		Murray	500	16–24–4	36
45	February 13	Ottawa	4–1	Washington		Forsberg	18,573	17–24–4	38
46	February 15	St. Louis	5–2	Ottawa		Murray	500	17–25–4	38
47	February 17	Ottawa	3–1	Buffalo		Forsberg	7,026	18–25–4	40
48	February 19	Boston	3–2	Ottawa	OT	Forsberg	5,212	18–25–5	41
49	February 20	NY Rangers	2–1	Ottawa		Gustavsson	5,181	18–26–5	41
50	February 22	Minnesota	3–4	Ottawa		Forsberg	7,602	19–26–5	43
51	February 26	Montreal	2–1	Ottawa		Murray	9,958	19–27–5	43

March: 4–10–1 (home: 2–3–1; road: 2–7–0)
#	Date	Visitor	Score	Home	OT	Decision	Attendance	Record	Pts	Recap
52	March 1	Ottawa	2–5	Tampa Bay		Murray	19,092	19–28–5	43
53	March 3	Ottawa	0–3	Florida		Forsberg	16,499	19–29–5	43
54	March 5	Ottawa	5–8	Arizona		Murray	11,810	19–30–5	43
55	March 6	Ottawa	1–2	Vegas		Forsberg	17,909	19–31–5	43
56	March 8	Ottawa	4–1	St. Louis		Forsberg	18,096	20–31–5	45
57	March 10	Seattle	3–4	Ottawa	OT	Forsberg	11,622	21–31–5	47
58	March 12	Chicago	6–3	Ottawa		Forsberg	14,252	21–32–5	47
59	March 14	Arizona	5–3	Ottawa		Gustavsson	9,201	21–33–5	47
60	March 16	Columbus	4–1	Ottawa		Forsberg	10,087	21–34–5	47
61	March 18	Philadelphia	1–3	Ottawa		Forsberg	11,431	22–34–5	49
62	March 19	Ottawa	1–5	Montreal		Gustavsson	21,105	22–35–5	49
63	March 22	Ottawa	0–3	NY Islanders		Forsberg	15,856	22–36–5	49
64	March 24	Ottawa	5–2	Winnipeg		Forsberg	14,175	23–36–5	51
65	March 26	Florida	4–3	Ottawa	SO	Forsberg	17,201	23–36–6	52
66	March 29	Ottawa	1–4	Nashville		Forsberg	17,176	23–37–6	52

April: 10–5–1 (home: 3–3–1; road: 7–2–0)
#	Date	Visitor	Score	Home	OT	Decision	Attendance	Record	Pts	Recap
67	April 1	Ottawa	5–2	Detroit		Sogaard	17,563	24–37–6	54
68	April 3	Detroit	2–5	Ottawa		Forsberg	16,402	25–37–6	56
69	April 5	Ottawa	6–3	Montreal		Forsberg	20,566	26–37–6	58
70	April 7	Nashville	3–2	Ottawa		Forsberg	12,103	26–38–6	58
71	April 9	Ottawa	1–5	NY Rangers		Forsberg	18,006	26–39–6	58
72	April 10	Winnipeg	4–3	Ottawa		Sogaard	12,207	26–40–6	58
73	April 12	Ottawa	4–1	Detroit		Forsberg	16,093	27–40–6	60
74	April 14	Ottawa	3–2	Boston		Forsberg	17,850	28–40–6	62
75	April 16	Toronto	5–4	Ottawa	OT	Forsberg	18,655	28–40–7	63
76	April 18	Ottawa	2–4	Seattle		Forsberg	17,151	28–41–7	63
77	April 19	Ottawa	4–3	Vancouver	SO	Gustavsson	18,845	29–41–7	65
78	April 22	Ottawa	2–1	Columbus	SO	Gustavsson	18,116	30–41–7	67
79	April 23	Montreal	4–6	Ottawa		Forsberg	19,410	31–41–7	69
80	April 26	New Jersey	4–5	Ottawa	OT	Forsberg	13,101	32–41–7	71
81	April 28	Florida	4–0	Ottawa		Gustavsson	17,102	32–42–7	71
82	April 29	Ottawa	4–2	Philadelphia		Forsberg	17,575	33–42–7	73

Legend: Win (2 points) Loss (0 points) Overtime/shootout loss (1 point)

== Player statistics ==
=== Skaters ===
Regular season
Player	GP	G	A	Pts	+/−	PIM
Brady Tkachuk	79	30	37	67	−7	117
Tim Stützle	79	22	36	58	−27	37
Josh Norris	66	35	20	55	−7	16
Drake Batherson	46	17	27	44	+4	32
Connor Brown	64	10	29	39	−15	10
Thomas Chabot	59	7	31	38	−3	26
Alex Formenton	79	18	14	32	−13	59
Tyler Ennis	57	8	16	24	−6	16
Artyom Zub	81	6	16	22	+1	60
Nick Holden	76	5	14	19	0	12
Nick Paul^{‡}	59	11	7	18	−18	22
Chris Tierney	70	6	12	18	−12	14
Zach Sanford^{‡}	62	9	8	17	−13	37
Austin Watson	67	10	6	16	−3	91
Erik Brannstrom	53	0	14	14	−17	30
Michael Del Zotto	26	3	10	13	−4	4
Parker Kelly	41	7	5	12	−4	60
Mathieu Joseph^{†}	11	4	8	12	+8	6
Adam Gaudette^{†}	50	4	8	12	−6	13
Nikita Zaitsev	62	2	9	11	−7	28
Colin White	24	3	7	10	−11	4
Dylan Gambrell	63	3	4	7	+2	12
Victor Mete	37	0	7	7	−19	4
Josh Brown^{‡}	46	0	6	6	−9	32
Lassi Thomson	16	0	5	5	−8	2
Mark Kastelic	16	2	2	4	−1	14
Travis Hamonic^{†}	19	1	2	3	+5	8
Logan Shaw	17	1	2	3	−3	2
Scott Sabourin	7	0	2	2	−2	11
Clark Bishop	9	0	1	1	−3	6
Jacob Bernard-Docker	8	0	1	1	1	4
Shane Pinto	5	0	1	1	0	2
Andrew Agozzino	1	0	0	0	0	0
Dillon Heatherington	9	0	0	0	–1	7
Zachary Senyshyn	2	0	0	0	–1	2
Egor Sokolov	8	0	0	0	−6	4
Cole Reinhardt	1	0	0	0	0	2
Viktor Lodin	1	0	0	0	0	0

=== Goaltenders ===
Regular season
Player	GP	GS	TOI	W	L	OT	GA	GAA	SA	SV%	SO	G	A	PIM
Anton Forsberg	46	44	2,571:27	22	17	4	121	2.82	1,457	.917	1	0	0	2
Matt Murray	20	20	1,181:30	5	12	2	60	3.05	640	.906	1	0	0	0
Filip Gustavsson	18	16	1,047:33	5	12	1	62	3.55	574	.892	0	0	0	0
Mads Sogaard	2	2	117:18	1	1	0	6	3.07	54	.889	0	0	0	0

^{†}Denotes player spent time with another team before joining the Senators. Stats reflect time with the Senators only.
^{‡}No longer with the Senators.

== Awards and honours ==
=== Milestones ===
Player	Milestone	Date
Drake Batherson	100th career NHL game	October 14, 2021
Connor Brown	100th career NHL assist	October 17, 2021
Brady Tkachuk	200th career NHL game	October 23, 2021
Egor Sokolov	1st career NHL game	November 9, 2021
Lassi Thomson	1st career NHL game	November 12, 2021
Mark Kastelic	1st career NHL game	January 29, 2022
Mads Sogaard	1st career NHL game	April 1, 2022
Cole Reinhardt	1st career NHL game	April 7, 2022
Viktor Lodin	1st career NHL game	April 29, 2022

== Transactions ==
The Senators have been involved in the following transactions during the 2021–22 season.

=== Trades ===
Date	Details		Ref
July 24, 2021	To Los Angeles Kings 2nd-round pick in 2021	To Ottawa Senators STL 2nd-round pick in 2021; 5th-round pick in 2021	
July 28, 2021	To Vegas Golden Knights Evgenii Dadonov	To Ottawa Senators Nick Holden; 3rd-round pick in 2022	
September 25, 2021	To St. Louis Blues Logan Brown; Conditional^{1} 4th-round pick in 2022	To Ottawa Senators Zach Sanford	
October 24, 2021	To San Jose Sharks 7th-round pick in 2022	To Ottawa Senators Dylan Gambrell	
March 20, 2022	To Vancouver Canucks VAN 3rd-round pick in 2022	To Ottawa Senators Travis Hamonic	
March 20, 2022	To Tampa Bay Lightning Nick Paul	To Ottawa Senators Mathieu Joseph; 4th-round pick in 2024	
March 21, 2022	To Boston Bruins Josh Brown; Conditional^{2} 7th-round pick in 2022	To Ottawa Senators Zachary Senyshyn; 5th-round pick in 2022	
March 21, 2022	To Winnipeg Jets Zach Sanford	To Ottawa Senators 5th-round pick in 2022	
March 21, 2022	To Calgary Flames Future considerations	To Ottawa Senators Michael McNiven	

==== Notes ====
^1 St. Louis will receive a 4th-round pick in 2022 if Brown plays fewer than 30 games for St. Louis in 2021–22; otherwise no pick will be exchanged.
^2 Boston will receive a 6th-round pick in 2022 if Senyshyn plays at least 5 games with Ottawa during the 2021-22 season; otherwise Boston will receive a 7th-round pick in 2022.

=== Players acquired ===
Date	Player	Former team	Term	Via	Ref
July 29, 2021	Andrew Agozzino	Anaheim Ducks	1-year	Free agency	
July 29, 2021	Michael Del Zotto	Columbus Blue Jackets	2-year	Free agency	
July 29, 2021	Pontus Aberg	Traktor Chelyabinsk (KHL)	1-year	Free agency	
July 29, 2021	Kole Sherwood	Columbus Blue Jackets	1-year	Free agency	
July 29, 2021	Dillon Heatherington	Barys Nur-Sultan (KHL)	1-year	Free agency	
August 17, 2021	Scott Sabourin	Toronto Maple Leafs	1-year	Free agency	
October 7, 2021	Tyler Ennis	Edmonton Oilers	1-year	Free agency	
November 14, 2021	Zac Leslie	Belleville Senators (AHL)	1-year	Free agency	
November 27, 2021	Adam Gaudette	Chicago Blackhawks		Waivers	

=== Players lost ===
Date	Player	New team	Term	Via	Ref
July 21, 2021	Joey Daccord	Seattle Kraken		Expansion draft	
July 28, 2021	Ryan Dzingel	Arizona Coyotes	1-year	Free agency	
July 29, 2021	Michael Amadio	Toronto Maple Leafs	1-year	Free agency	
July 29, 2021	J. C. Beaudin	Laval Rocket (AHL)	1-year	Free agency	
July 29, 2021	Matthew Peca	St. Louis Blues	1-year	Free agency	
July 29, 2021	Jack Kopacka	Toronto Marlies (AHL)	1-year	Free agency	
July 31, 2021	Derek Stepan	Carolina Hurricanes	1-year	Free agency	
July 31, 2021	Zach Magwood	HC TWK Innsbruck (ICEHL)	1-year	Free agency	
September 23, 2021	Brandon Fortunato	Jacksonville Icemen (ECHL)	Unknown	Free agency	
October 20, 2021	Artem Anisimov	Lokomotiv Yaroslavl (KHL)	1-year	Free agency	
December 6, 2021	Pontus Aberg			Contract termination	
December 7, 2021	Pontus Aberg	Timra IK (SHL)	1-year	Free agency	
July 5, 2022	Colin White			Buy-out	

=== Signings ===
Date	Player	Term	Contract type	Ref
August 4, 2021	Victor Mete	1-year	Re-signing	
August 29, 2021	Filip Gustavsson	2-year	Re-signing	
September 3, 2021	Drake Batherson	6-year	Re-signing	
September 18, 2021	Logan Brown	1-year	Re-signing	
September 29, 2021	Zack Ostapchuk	3-year	Entry-level	
October 12, 2021	Parker Kelly	2-year	Extension	
October 14, 2021	Brady Tkachuk	7-year	Re-signing	
December 28, 2021	Tyler Boucher	3-year	Entry-level	
January 27, 2022	Nick Holden	1-year	Extension	
March 17, 2022	Philippe Daoust	3-year	Entry-level	
March 21, 2022	Anton Forsberg	3-year	Extension	
March 27, 2022	Jake Sanderson	3-year	Entry-level	
June 15, 2022	Dylan Gambrell	1-year	Extension	

== Draft picks ==
The Senators' top pick was the tenth-overall draft pick in the 2021 NHL entry draft, Tyler Boucher. The Senators made two trades on day two of the draft, moving up in the selections and ending up with six selections overall. The draft was held July 23–24, 2024 virtually via video conference call from the NHL Network studio in Secaucus, New Jersey.

Round	Overall	Player	Position	Nationality	Club team
1	10	Tyler Boucher	RW	United States	U.S. NTDP (USHL)
2	39	Zack Ostapchuk	C	Canada	Vancouver Giants (WHL)
2	49	Benjamin Roger	D	Canada	London Knights (OHL)
3	74	Oliver Johansson	LW	Sweden	Timra (HockeyAllsvenskan)
4	123	Carson Latimer	RW	Canada	Edmonton Oil Kings (WHL)
7	202	Chandler Romeo	D	Canada	Brantford Bandits (GOJHL)
