= 2021–22 Nashville Predators season =

Season of play of professional ice hockey team

2021–22 Nashville Predators
- Division: 5th Central
- Conference: 8th Western
- 2021–22 record: 45–30–7
- Home record: 25–14–2
- Road record: 20–16–5
- Goals for: 266
- Goals against: 252

Team information
- General manager: David Poile
- Coach: John Hynes
- Captain: Roman Josi
- Alternate captains: Mattias Ekholm; Filip Forsberg; Mikael Granlund; Ryan Johansen
- Arena: Bridgestone Arena
- Average attendance: 18,495
- Minor league affiliates: Milwaukee Admirals (AHL); Florida Everblades (ECHL)

Team leaders
- Goals: Matt Duchene (43)
- Assists: Roman Josi (73)
- Points: Roman Josi (96)
- Penalty minutes: Mark Borowiecki (151)
- Plus/minus: Alexandre Carrier (+26)
- Wins: Juuse Saros (38)
- Goals against average: Juuse Saros (2.64)

The 2021–22 Nashville Predators season was the 24th season for the National Hockey League (NHL) franchise that was established on June 25, 1997. John Hynes entered his third season and second full season as head coach of the team.

The Predators opened the season at home on October 14, 2021, against the NHL's expansion team, the Seattle Kraken. The Predators lost the game 4–3, giving the Kraken the franchise's first-ever win. On April 26, 2022, the Predators clinched a playoff berth after the Dallas Stars defeated the Vegas Golden Knights in a shootout. In the playoffs, the Predators were swept in the first round by the eventual Stanley Cup champion Colorado Avalanche.

== Standings ==
=== Divisional standings ===
Central Division
Pos	Team	GP	W	L	OTL	RW	GF	GA	GD	Pts
1	z – Colorado Avalanche	82	56	19	7	46	312	234	+78	119
2	x – Minnesota Wild	82	53	22	7	37	310	253	+57	113
3	x – St. Louis Blues	82	49	22	11	43	311	242	+69	109
4	x – Dallas Stars	82	46	30	6	31	238	246	−8	98
5	x – Nashville Predators	82	45	30	7	35	266	252	+14	97
6	Winnipeg Jets	82	39	32	11	31	252	257	−5	89
7	Chicago Blackhawks	82	28	42	12	16	219	291	−72	68
8	Arizona Coyotes	82	25	50	7	18	207	313	−106	57

Source: National Hockey League
Rules for classification: 1) Fewer number of games played (GP, only during regular season); 2) Greater number of regulation wins (RW); 3) Greater number of wins in regulation and overtime, excluding shootout wins (ROW); 4) Greater number of total wins, including shootouts (W); 5) Greater number of points earned in head-to-head play; if teams played an uneven number of head-to-head games, the result of the first game on the home ice of the team with the extra home game is discarded; 6) Greater goal differential (GD); 7) Greater number of goals scored (GF)
x – Clinched playoff spot; z – Clinched conference

=== Conference standings ===
Western Conference Wild Card
Pos	Div	Team	GP	W	L	OTL	RW	GF	GA	GD	Pts
1	CE	x – Dallas Stars	82	46	30	6	31	238	246	−8	98
2	CE	x – Nashville Predators	82	45	30	7	35	266	252	+14	97
3	PA	Vegas Golden Knights	82	43	31	8	34	266	248	+18	94
4	PA	Vancouver Canucks	82	40	30	12	32	249	236	+13	92
5	CE	Winnipeg Jets	82	39	32	11	32	252	257	−5	89
6	PA	San Jose Sharks	82	32	37	13	22	214	264	−50	77
7	PA	Anaheim Ducks	82	31	37	14	22	232	271	−39	76
8	CE	Chicago Blackhawks	82	28	42	12	16	219	291	−72	68
9	PA	Seattle Kraken	82	27	49	6	23	216	285	−69	60
10	CE	Arizona Coyotes	82	25	50	7	18	207	313	−106	57

Source: National Hockey League
Rules for classification: 1) Fewer number of games played (GP, only during regular season); 2) Greater number of regulation wins (RW); 3) Greater number of wins in regulation and overtime, excluding shootout wins (ROW); 4) Greater number of total wins, including shootouts (W); 5) Greater number of points earned in head-to-head play; if teams played an uneven number of head-to-head games, the result of the first game on the home ice of the team with the extra home game is discarded; 6) Greater goal differential (GD); 7) Greater number of goals scored (GF)
x – Clinched playoff spot

== Schedule and results ==
=== Preseason ===
2021 preseason: 4–1–1 (home: 2–0–0; road: 2–1–1)

Game	Date	Opponent	Score	OT	Decision	Location	Attendance	Record	Recap
1	September 26	@ Florida Panthers	4–5	OT	Cooley	FLA Live Arena	5,860	0–0–1	
2	September 26	@ Florida Panthers	1–3		Rittich	FLA Live Arena	5,283	0–1–1	
3	September 30	@ Tampa Bay Lightning	6–2		Rittich	Amalie Arena	11,054	1–1–1	
4	October 2	Tampa Bay Lightning	6–1		Saros	Bridgestone Arena	14,884	2–1–1	
5	October 5	@ Carolina Hurricanes	3–2	OT	Saros	PNC Arena	7,011	3–1–1	
6	October 9	Carolina Hurricanes	4–3		Rittich	Bridgestone Arena	15,095	4–1–1	

=== Regular season ===
2021–22 game log
October: 4–4–0 (home: 3–3–0; road: 1–1–0)

Game	Date	Opponent	Score	OT	Decision	Location	Attendance	Record	Points	Recap
1	October 14	Seattle Kraken	3–4		Saros	Bridgestone Arena	17,159	0–1–0	0	
2	October 16	Carolina Hurricanes	2–3		Saros	Bridgestone Arena	17,162	0–2–0	0	
3	October 19	Los Angeles Kings	2–1		Saros	Bridgestone Arena	17,159	1–2–0	2	
4	October 21	New York Rangers	1–3		Saros	Bridgestone Arena	17,159	1–3–0	2	
5	October 23	@ Winnipeg Jets	4–6		Saros	Canada Life Centre	14,020	1–4–0	2	
6	October 24	@ Minnesota Wild	5–2		Ingram	Xcel Energy Center	16,014	2–4–0	4	
7	October 25	San Jose Sharks	3–1		Saros	Bridgestone Arena	16,395	3–4–0	6	
8	October 30	New York Islanders	3–2	SO	Saros	Bridgestone Arena	17,159	4–4–0	8	

November: 8–5–1 (home: 4–1–0; road: 4–4–1)

Game	Date	Opponent	Score	OT	Decision	Location	Attendance	Record	Points	Recap
9	November 2	@ Calgary Flames	3–2	OT	Saros	Scotiabank Saddledome	14,324	5–4–0	10	
10	November 3	@ Edmonton Oilers	2–5		Ingram	Rogers Place	14,414	5–5–0	10	
11	November 5	@ Vancouver Canucks	3–2		Saros	Rogers Arena	18,870	6–5–0	12	
12	November 7	@ Chicago Blackhawks	1–2	OT	Saros	United Center	16,891	6–5–1	13	
13	November 10	@ Dallas Stars	4–2		Saros	American Airlines Center	17,560	7–5–1	15	
14	November 11	@ St. Louis Blues	4–3	OT	Rittich	Enterprise Center	18,096	8–5–1	17	
15	November 13	Arizona Coyotes	4–1		Saros	Bridgestone Arena	17,159	9–5–1	19	
16	November 16	@ Toronto Maple Leafs	0–3		Saros	Scotiabank Arena	18,949	9–6–1	19	
—	November 18	@ Ottawa Senators	Postponed due to multiple Senators players with COVID-19. Moved to April 7.							
17	November 20	@ Montreal Canadiens	3–6		Saros	Bell Centre	20,522	9–7–1	19	
18	November 22	Anaheim Ducks	3–2		Saros	Bridgestone Arena	17,159	10–7–1	21	
19	November 24	Vegas Golden Knights	2–5		Saros	Bridgestone Arena	17,174	10–8–1	21	
20	November 26	New Jersey Devils	4–2		Saros	Bridgestone Arena	17,159	11–8–1	23	
21	November 27	@ Colorado Avalanche	2–6		Rittich	Ball Arena	17,050	11–9–1	23	
22	November 30	Columbus Blue Jackets	6–0		Saros	Bridgestone Arena	16,874	12–9–1	25	

December: 7–2–1 (home: 2–1–0; road: 5–1–1)

Game	Date	Opponent	Score	OT	Decision	Location	Attendance	Record	Points	Recap
23	December 2	Boston Bruins	0–2		Saros	Bridgestone Arena	17,159	12–10–1	25	
24	December 4	Montreal Canadiens	4–3	OT	Saros	Bridgestone Arena	17,159	13–10–1	27	
25	December 7	@ Detroit Red Wings	5–2		Rittich	Little Caesars Arena	15,539	14–10–1	29	
26	December 9	@ New York Islanders	4–3		Rittich	UBS Arena	17,255	15–10–1	31	
27	December 10	@ New Jersey Devils	3–2		Saros	Prudential Center	14,218	16–10–1	33	
28	December 12	@ New York Rangers	1–0		Saros	Madison Square Garden	16,177	17–10–1	35	
—	December 14	Calgary Flames	Postponed due to COVID-19. Moved to April 19.							
29	December 16	Colorado Avalanche	5–2		Saros	Bridgestone Arena	17,184	18–10–1	37	
30	December 17	@ Chicago Blackhawks	3–2	OT	Saros	United Center	18,298	19–10–1	39	
—	December 19	@ Carolina Hurricanes	Postponed due to COVID-19. Moved to February 18.							
—	December 21	Winnipeg Jets	Postponed due to COVID-19. Moved to February 12.							
—	December 23	@ Florida Panthers	Postponed due to COVID-19. Moved to February 22.							
—	December 27	@ Dallas Stars	Postponed due to COVID-19. Moved to February 9.							
31	December 29	@ Washington Capitals	3–5		Saros	Capital One Arena	18,573	19–11–1	39	
32	December 30	@ Columbus Blue Jackets	3–4	SO	Rittich	Nationwide Arena	17,494	19–11–2	40	

January: 8–3–2 (home: 4–2–0; road: 4–1–2)

Game	Date	Opponent	Score	OT	Decision	Location	Attendance	Record	Points	Recap
33	January 1	Chicago Blackhawks	6–1		Saros	Bridgestone Arena	17,504	20–11–2	42	
34	January 4	@ Vegas Golden Knights	3–2		Saros	T-Mobile Arena	17,804	21–11–2	44	
35	January 6	@ Los Angeles Kings	4–2		Saros	Crypto.com Arena	14,359	22–11–2	46	
36	January 8	@ Arizona Coyotes	4–2		Saros	Gila River Arena	10,317	23–11–2	48	
37	January 11	Colorado Avalanche	5–4	OT	Saros	Bridgestone Arena	17,159	24–11–2	50	
38	January 13	Buffalo Sabres	1–4		Saros	Bridgestone Arena	17,159	24–12–2	50	
39	January 15	@ Boston Bruins	3–4	OT	Saros	TD Garden	17,850	24–12–3	51	
40	January 17	@ St. Louis Blues	3–5		Saros	Enterprise Center	18,096	24–13–3	51	
41	January 18	Vancouver Canucks	1–3		Rittich	Bridgestone Arena	16,676	24–14–3	51	
42	January 20	Winnipeg Jets	5–2		Saros	Bridgestone Arena	17,159	25–14–3	53	
43	January 22	Detroit Red Wings	4–1		Saros	Bridgestone Arena	17,455	26–14–3	55	
44	January 25	@ Seattle Kraken	4–2		Saros	Climate Pledge Arena	17,151	27–14–3	57	
45	January 27	@ Edmonton Oilers	2–3	SO	Saros	Rogers Place	9,150	27–14–4	58	

February: 3–5–0 (home: 2–3–0; road: 1–2–0)

Game	Date	Opponent	Score	OT	Decision	Location	Attendance	Record	Points	Recap
46	February 1	Vancouver Canucks	4–2		Saros	Bridgestone Arena	17,159	28–14–4	60	
47	February 9	@ Dallas Stars	3–4		Saros	American Airlines Center	17,780	28–15–4	60	
48	February 12	Winnipeg Jets	2–5		Saros	Bridgestone Arena	17,688	28–16–4	60	
49	February 15	Washington Capitals	1–4		Saros	Bridgestone Arena	17,238	28–17–4	60	
50	February 18	@ Carolina Hurricanes	3–5		Saros	PNC Arena	18,911	29–17–4	62	
51	February 22	@ Florida Panthers	6–4		Rittich	FLA Live Arena	14,234	29–18–4	62	
52	February 24	Dallas Stars	2–1	SO	Saros	Bridgestone Arena	17,869	30–18–4	64	
53	February 26	Tampa Bay Lightning	2–3		Saros	Nissan Stadium	68,619 (outdoors)	30–19–4	64	

March: 9–5–0 (home: 6–1–0; road: 3–4–0)

Game	Date	Opponent	Score	OT	Decision	Location	Attendance	Record	Points	Recap
54	March 2	@ Seattle Kraken	3–4		Saros	Climate Pledge Arena	17,151	30–20–4	64	
55	March 5	@ San Jose Sharks	8–0		Saros	SAP Center	13,936	31–20–4	66	
56	March 8	Dallas Stars	2–1		Saros	Bridgestone Arena	17,306	32–20–4	68	
57	March 10	Anaheim Ducks	4–1		Saros	Bridgestone Arena	17,159	33–20–4	70	
58	March 12	St. Louis Blues	4–7		Saros	Bridgestone Arena	17,565	33–21–4	70	
59	March 13	@ Minnesota Wild	6–2		Rittich	Xcel Energy Center	19,009	34–21–4	72	
60	March 15	Pittsburgh Penguins	4–1		Saros	Bridgestone Arena	17,498	35–21–4	74	
61	March 17	@ Philadelphia Flyers	4–5		Saros	Wells Fargo Center	18,405	35–22–4	74	
62	March 19	Toronto Maple Leafs	6–3		Saros	Bridgestone Arena	17,692	36–22–4	76	
63	March 21	@ Anaheim Ducks	6–3		Saros	Honda Center	11,679	37–22–4	78	
64	March 22	@ Los Angeles Kings	1–6		Rittich	Crypto.com Arena	12,629	37–23–4	78	
65	March 24	@ Vegas Golden Knights	1–6		Saros	T-Mobile Arena	18,021	37–24–4	78	
66	March 27	Philadelphia Flyers	5–4		Saros	Bridgestone Arena	17,414	38–24–4	80	
67	March 29	Ottawa Senators	4–1		Saros	Bridgestone Arena	17,176	39–24–4	82	

April: 6–6–3 (home: 4–3–2; road: 2–3–1)

Game	Date	Opponent	Score	OT	Decision	Location	Attendance	Record	Points	Recap
68	April 1	@ Buffalo Sabres	3–4		Saros	KeyBank Center	19,070	39–25–4	82	
69	April 5	Minnesota Wild	6–2		Saros	Bridgestone Arena	17,244	40–25–4	84	
70	April 7	@ Ottawa Senators	3–2		Saros	Canadian Tire Centre	12,103	41–25–4	86	
71	April 9	Florida Panthers	1–4		Saros	Bridgestone Arena	17,465	41–26–4	86	
72	April 10	@ Pittsburgh Penguins	2–3	OT	Rittich	PPG Paints Arena	17,553	41–26–5	87	
73	April 12	San Jose Sharks	1–0	OT	Saros	Bridgestone Arena	17,159	42–26–5	89	
74	April 14	Edmonton Oilers	0–4		Saros	Bridgestone Arena	17,403	42–27–5	89	
75	April 16	Chicago Blackhawks	4–3		Saros	Bridgestone Arena	17,159	43–27–5	91	
76	April 17	St. Louis Blues	3–8		Saros	Bridgestone Arena	17,277	43–28–5	91	
77	April 19	Calgary Flames	3–2	SO	Saros	Bridgestone Arena	17,237	44–28–5	93	
78	April 23	@ Tampa Bay Lightning	2–6		Saros	Amalie Arena	19,092	44–29–5	93	
79	April 24	Minnesota Wild	4–5	OT	Rittich	Bridgestone Arena	17,160	44–29–6	94	
80	April 26	Calgary Flames	4–5	OT	Rittich	Bridgestone Arena	17,498	44–29–7	95	
81	April 28	@ Colorado Avalanche	5–4	SO	Rittich	Ball Arena	18,011	45–29–7	97	
82	April 29	@ Arizona Coyotes	4–5		Ingram	Gila River Arena	15,123	45–30–7	97	

2021–22 schedule

Win (2 Points) Loss (0 points) Overtime/shootout loss (1 point)

=== Playoffs ===
2022 Stanley Cup playoffs

Western Conference First Round vs. (C1) Colorado Avalanche: Colorado won 4–0
#	Date	Visitor	Score	Home	OT	Decision	Attendance	Series	Recap
1	May 3	Nashville	2–7	Colorado		Rittich	18,091	0–1
2	May 5	Nashville	1–2	Colorado	OT	Ingram	18,115	0–2
3	May 7	Colorado	7–3	Nashville		Ingram	17,430	0–3
4	May 9	Colorado	5–3	Nashville		Ingram	17,188	0–4

Legend: Win Loss

== Player statistics ==
As of April 30, 2022

=== Skaters ===
Regular season
Player	GP	G	A	Pts	+/−	PIM
Roman Josi	80	23	73	96	+13	46
Matt Duchene	78	43	43	86	+6	38
Filip Forsberg	69	42	42	84	+12	22
Mikael Granlund	80	11	53	64	−9	33
Ryan Johansen	79	26	37	63	−2	53
Tanner Jeannot	81	24	17	41	+2	130
Philip Tomasino	76	11	21	32	+2	10
Mattias Ekholm	76	6	25	31	+14	44
Alexandre Carrier	77	3	27	30	+26	50
Colton Sissons	79	7	21	28	+2	30
Yakov Trenin	80	17	7	24	+7	46
Dante Fabbro	66	3	21	24	+13	24
Eeli Tolvanen	75	11	12	23	−7	16
Luke Kunin	82	13	9	22	−11	99
Nick Cousins	68	9	13	22	−8	31
Michael McCarron	51	7	7	14	+10	70
Matt Benning	65	0	11	11	−24	39
Tommy Novak	27	1	6	7	−4	2
Matt Luff	23	3	3	6	+3	4
Philippe Myers	27	1	3	4	+5	12
Mark Borowiecki	57	0	4	4	−9	151
Matt Tennyson	8	0	3	3	0	4
Jeremy Davies	6	0	2	2	−5	2
Jeremy Lauzon^{†}	13	1	0	1	+3	14
Ben Harpur	19	0	1	1	−10	27
Mathieu Olivier	10	0	1	1	−3	14
Cody Glass	8	0	1	1	0	0
Rocco Grimaldi	7	0	0	0	0	2
Kole Sherwood	1	0	0	0	0	0
Cole Smith	8	0	0	0	−3	0

Playoffs
Player	GP	G	A	Pts	+/−	PIM
Matt Duchene	4	3	1	4	+1	0
Yakov Trenin	4	3	0	3	−1	4
Mikael Granlund	4	0	3	3	−1	0
Alexandre Carrier	4	0	3	3	−1	2
Roman Josi	4	1	1	2	−3	0
Mattias Ekholm	4	0	2	2	−2	0
Ryan Johansen	4	0	2	2	−2	2
Colton Sissons	4	0	2	2	−1	0
Filip Forsberg	4	1	0	1	−1	6
Eeli Tolvanen	3	1	0	1	−2	2
Matt Benning	3	0	1	1	−2	0
Luke Kunin	4	0	1	1	−2	4
Tanner Jeannot	4	0	1	1	−4	0
Mark Borowiecki	2	0	0	0	−1	0
Nick Cousins	3	0	0	0	−4	0
Michael McCarron	2	0	0	0	−3	2
Jeremy Lauzon	3	0	0	0	−3	2
Dante Fabbro	4	0	0	0	−4	4
Mathieu Olivier	3	0	0	0	−3	12
Cody Glass	2	0	0	0	0	0
Philip Tomasino	3	0	0	0	−2	12

=== Goaltenders ===
Regular season
Player	GP	GS	TOI	W	L	OT	GA	GAA	SA	SV%	SO	G	A	PIM
Juuse Saros	67	67	3,931:23	38	25	3	173	2.64	2,107	.918	4	0	0	0
David Rittich	17	12	822:56	6	3	4	49	3.57	431	.886	0	0	0	2
Connor Ingram	3	3	177:45	1	2	0	11	3.71	91	.879	0	0	0	0

Playoffs
Player	GP	GS	TOI	W	L	GA	GAA	SA	SV%	SO	G	A	PIM
Connor Ingram	4	3	230:51	0	3	14	3.64	161	.913	0	0	0	0
David Rittich	1	1	15:04	0	1	5	19.91	13	.615	0	0	0	0

^{†}Denotes player spent time with another team before joining the Predators. Stats reflect time with the Predators only.
^{‡}Denotes player was traded mid-season. Stats reflect time with the Predators only.
Bold/italics denotes franchise record.

== Transactions ==
The Predators have been involved in the following transactions during the 2021–22 season.

=== Trades ===
Date	Details		Ref
July 23, 2021	To Carolina Hurricanes LAK 2nd-round pick in 2021; 2nd-round pick in 2021	To Nashville Predators 1st-round pick in 2021	
July 24, 2021	To Carolina Hurricanes 3rd-round pick in 2021; 5th-round pick in 2021	To Nashville Predators LAK 3rd-round pick in 2021	
February 1, 2022	To Tampa Bay Lightning Anthony Richard	To Nashville Predators Jimmy Huntington	
March 20, 2022	To Seattle Kraken 2nd-round pick in 2022	To Nashville Predators Jeremy Lauzon	
March 21, 2022	To Los Angeles Kings Frederic Allard	To Nashville Predators Brayden Burke	
March 21, 2022	To Toronto Maple Leafs Future considerations	To Nashville Predators Alex Biega	
June 30, 2022	To Columbus Blue Jackets Mathieu Olivier	To Nashville Predators TOR 4th-round pick in 2022	
July 3, 2022	To Tampa Bay Lightning Philippe Myers; Grant Mismash	To Nashville Predators Ryan McDonagh	

=== Players acquired ===
Date	Player	Former team	Term	Via	Ref
July 28, 2021	Matt Luff	Los Angeles Kings	1-year	Free agency	
July 28, 2021	David Rittich	Toronto Maple Leafs	1-year	Free agency	
July 28, 2021	Matt Tennyson	New Jersey Devils	2-year	Free agency	
March 9, 2022	Navrin Mutter	Kitchener Rangers (OHL)	3-year	Free agency	
June 9, 2022	Markus Nurmi	TPS (Liiga)	1-year	Free agency	

=== Players lost ===
Date	Player	New team	Term	Via	Ref
July 13, 2021	Pekka Rinne			Retirement	
July 21, 2021	Calle Jarnkrok	Seattle Kraken		Expansion draft	
July 28, 2021	Erik Haula	Boston Bruins	2-year	Free agency	
July 28, 2021	Tyler Lewington	Boston Bruins	1-year	Free agency	
July 28, 2021	Sean Malone	Buffalo Sabres	1-year	Free agency	
July 29, 2021	Michael Carcone	Arizona Coyotes	2-year	Free agency	
August 12, 2021	Lukas Craggs	Rochester Americans (AHL)	1-year	Free agency	
August 18, 2021	Josh Wilkins	Vasterviks IK (HockeyAllsvenskan)	Unknown	Free agency	
September 8, 2021	Brad Richardson	Calgary Flames	1-year	Free agency	
September 10, 2021	Erik Gudbranson	Calgary Flames	1-year	Free agency	
October 5, 2021	Rem Pitlick	Minnesota Wild		Waivers	
October 12, 2021	Luca Sbisa			Retirement	
November 25, 2021	Patrick Harper			Contract termination	

=== Signings ===
Date	Player	Term	Contract type	Ref
July 15, 2021	Cole Smith	1-year	Re-signing	
July 26, 2021	Frederic Allard	1-year	Re-signing	
July 27, 2021	Jeremy Davies	1-year	Re-signing	
July 27, 2021	Ben Harpur	1-year	Re-Signing	
July 28, 2021	Mikael Granlund	4-year	Re-signing	
July 28, 2021	Zachary L'Heureux	3-year	Entry-level	
July 28, 2021	Michael McCarron	2-year	Re-signing	
July 28, 2021	Anthony Richard	1-year	Re-signing	
July 29, 2021	Mathieu Olivier	2-year	Re-signing	
July 30, 2021	Tanner Jeannot	2-year	Re-signing	
August 4, 2021	Rem Pitlick	1-year	Re-signing	
August 5, 2021	Dante Fabbro	2-year	Re-signing	
August 30, 2021	Eeli Tolvanen	3-year	Re-signing	
October 11, 2021	Jack Matier	3-year	Entry-level	
October 13, 2021	Mattias Ekholm	4-year	Extension	
February 15, 2022	Mark Borowiecki	1-year	Extension	
March 22, 2022	Jachym Kondelik	2-year	Entry-level	
March 31, 2022	Spencer Stastney	2-year	Entry-level	
April 13, 2022	Adam Wilsby	2-year	Entry-level	
May 16, 2022	Yaroslav Askarov	3-year	Entry-level	
June 13, 2022	Jeremy Lauzon	4-year	Extension	
June 24, 2022	Cody Glass	1-year	Extension	

== Draft picks ==
Below are the Nashville Predators' selections at the 2021 NHL entry draft, which were held on July 23 to 24, 2021. It was held virtually via Video conference call from the NHL Network studio in Secaucus, New Jersey.

Round	#	Player	Pos.	Nationality	Team (League)
1	19	Fedor Svechkov	C	Russia	Lada Togliatti (VHL)
1	27	Zachary L'Heureux	LW	Canada	Halifax Mooseheads (QMJHL)
3	72	Anton Olsson	D	Sweden	Malmo Redhawks (SHL)
4	115	Ryan Ufko	D	USA	Chicago Steel (USHL)
4	124	Jack Matier	D	Canada	Ottawa 67's (OHL)
6	179	Simon Knak	RW	Switzerland	Portland Winterhawks (WHL)
