= 2021–22 Detroit Red Wings season =

National Hockey League season

2021–22 Detroit Red Wings
- Division: 6th Atlantic
- Conference: 12th Eastern
- 2021–22 record: 32–40–10
- Home record: 18–16–7
- Road record: 14–24–3
- Goals for: 230
- Goals against: 312

Team information
- General manager: Steve Yzerman
- Coach: Jeff Blashill
- Captain: Dylan Larkin
- Alternate captains: Danny DeKeyser; Marc Staal
- Arena: Little Caesars Arena
- Average attendance: 16,984
- Minor league affiliates: Grand Rapids Griffins (AHL); Toledo Walleye (ECHL)

Team leaders
- Goals: Dylan Larkin (31)
- Assists: Moritz Seider (43)
- Points: Dylan Larkin (69)
- Penalty minutes: Givani Smith (108)
- Plus/minus: Kyle Criscuolo; Oskar Sundqvist (+1)
- Wins: Alex Nedeljkovic (20)
- Goals against average: Magnus Hellberg (3.00)

The 2021–22 Detroit Red Wings season was the 96th season for the National Hockey League (NHL) franchise that was established on September 25, 1926. It is the Red Wings' fifth season at Little Caesars Arena.

The Red Wings were eliminated from playoff contention for the sixth consecutive season on April 9, 2022 1971–72 season and the 1976–77 season.

== Off-season ==
On June 30, 2021, the Red Wings hired Alex Tanguay as an assistant coach.

On July 18, 2021, the NHL released the full list of players protected in the 2021 NHL expansion draft.

On July 21, 2021, the Seattle Kraken selected defenseman Dennis Cholowski during their expansion draft.

== Standings ==
=== Divisional standings ===
Atlantic Division
Pos	Team	GP	W	L	OTL	RW	GF	GA	GD	Pts
1	p – Florida Panthers	82	58	18	6	42	340	246	+94	122
2	x – Toronto Maple Leafs	82	54	21	7	45	315	253	+62	115
3	x – Tampa Bay Lightning	82	51	23	8	39	287	233	+54	110
4	x – Boston Bruins	82	51	26	5	40	255	220	+35	107
5	Buffalo Sabres	82	32	39	11	25	232	290	−58	75
6	Detroit Red Wings	82	32	40	10	21	230	312	−82	74
7	Ottawa Senators	82	33	42	7	26	227	266	−39	73
8	Montreal Canadiens	82	22	49	11	16	221	319	−98	55

Source: National Hockey League
Rules for classification: 1) Fewer number of games played (GP, only during regular season); 2) Greater number of regulation wins (RW); 3) Greater number of wins in regulation and overtime, excluding shootout wins (ROW); 4) Greater number of total wins, including shootouts (W); 5) Greater number of points earned in head-to-head play; if teams played an uneven number of head-to-head games, the result of the first game on the home ice of the team with the extra home game is discarded; 6) Greater goal differential (GD); 7) Greater number of goals scored (GF)
p – Clinched Presidents' Trophy; x – Clinched playoff spot

=== Conference standings ===
Eastern Conference Wild Card
Pos	Div	Team	GP	W	L	OTL	RW	GF	GA	GD	Pts
1	AT	x – Boston Bruins	82	51	26	5	40	255	220	+35	107
2	ME	x – Washington Capitals	82	44	26	12	35	275	245	+30	100
3	ME	New York Islanders	82	37	35	10	34	231	237	−6	84
4	ME	Columbus Blue Jackets	82	37	38	7	26	262	300	−38	81
5	AT	Buffalo Sabres	82	32	39	11	25	232	290	−58	75
6	AT	Detroit Red Wings	82	32	40	10	21	230	312	−82	74
7	AT	Ottawa Senators	82	33	42	7	26	227	266	−39	73
8	ME	New Jersey Devils	82	27	46	9	19	248	307	−59	63
9	ME	Philadelphia Flyers	82	25	46	11	20	211	298	−87	61
10	AT	Montreal Canadiens	82	22	49	11	16	221	319	−98	55

Source: National Hockey League
Rules for classification: 1) Fewer number of games played (GP, only during regular season); 2) Greater number of regulation wins (RW); 3) Greater number of wins in regulation and overtime, excluding shootout wins (ROW); 4) Greater number of total wins, including shootouts (W); 5) Greater number of points earned in head-to-head play; if teams played an uneven number of head-to-head games, the result of the first game on the home ice of the team with the extra home game is discarded; 6) Greater goal differential (GD); 7) Greater number of goals scored (GF)
x – Clinched playoff spot

== Schedule and results ==
=== Preseason ===
2021 preseason game log: 4–4–0 (Home: 3–1–0; Road: 1–3–0)
#	Date	Visitor	Score	Home	OT	Decision	Attendance	Record	Recap
1	September 29	Detroit	4–3	Chicago	SO	Pickard	—	1–0–0
2	September 30	Buffalo	2–6	Detroit		Nedeljkovic	14,352	2–0–0
3	October 2	Columbus	1–5	Detroit		Greiss	14,827	3–0–0
4	October 3	Detroit	1–5	Pittsburgh		Nedeljkovic	15,554	3–1–0
5	October 4	Chicago	6–4	Detroit		Greiss	14,769	3–2–0
6	October 6	Detroit	2–4	Columbus		Nedeljkovic	10,374	3–3–0
7	October 7	Pittsburgh	2–4	Detroit		Greiss	14,812	4–3–0
8	October 9	Detroit	1–3	Buffalo		Nedeljkovic	6,607	4–4–0

=== Regular season ===
2021–22 game log 32–40–10 (Home: 18–16–7; Road: 14–24–3)

October: 4–3–2 (Home: 2–1–2; Road: 2–2–0)
#	Date	Visitor	Score	Home	OT	Decision	Attendance	Record	Pts	Recap
1	October 14	Tampa Bay	7–6	Detroit	OT	Nedeljkovic	19,515	0–0–1	1
2	October 16	Vancouver	1–3	Detroit		Greiss	19,515	1–0–1	3
3	October 19	Columbus	1–4	Detroit		Greiss	19,515	2–0–1	5
4	October 21	Calgary	3–0	Detroit		Nedeljkovic	19,515	2–1–1	5
5	October 23	Detroit	1–6	Montreal		Greiss	19,706	2–2–1	5
6	October 24	Detroit	6–3	Chicago		Nedeljkovic	19,042	3–2–1	7
7	October 27	Detroit	3–2	Washington	OT	Greiss	18,573	4–2–1	9
8	October 29	Florida	3–2	Detroit	OT	Nedeljkovic	15,593	4–2–2	10
9	October 30	Detroit	4–5	Toronto		Greiss	18,921	4–3–2	10

November: 7–6–1 (Home: 5–1–0; Road: 2–5–1)
#	Date	Visitor	Score	Home	OT	Decision	Attendance	Record	Pts	Recap
10	November 2	Detroit	0–3	Montreal		Nedeljkovic	19,547	4–4–2	10
11	November 4	Detroit	1–5	Boston		Greiss	17,850	4–5–2	10
12	November 6	Detroit	4–3	Buffalo	OT	Nedeljkovic	8,171	5–5–2	12
13	November 7	Vegas	2–5	Detroit		Greiss	19,515	6–5–2	14
14	November 9	Edmonton	2–4	Detroit		Nedeljkovic	19,515	7–5–2	16
15	November 11	Washington	2–0	Detroit		Greiss	19,515	7–6–2	16
16	November 13	Montreal	2–3	Detroit	OT	Nedeljkovic	19,515	8–6–2	18
17	November 15	Detroit	3–5	Columbus		Greiss	15,293	8–7–2	18
18	November 16	Detroit	2–5	Dallas		Nedeljkovic	17,764	8–8–2	18
19	November 18	Detroit	2–5	Vegas		Greiss	18,002	8–9–2	18
20	November 20	Detroit	1–2	Arizona	OT	Nedeljkovic	12,906	8–9–3	19
21	November 24	St. Louis	2–4	Detroit		Nedeljkovic	19,515	9–9–3	21
22	November 27	Buffalo	2–3	Detroit	OT	Nedeljkovic	19,515	10–9–3	23
23	November 30	Detroit	2–1	Boston		Nedeljkovic	17,850	11–9–3	25

December: 4–5–0 (Home: 4–2–0; Road: 0–3–0)
#	Date	Visitor	Score	Home	OT	Decision	Attendance	Record	Pts	Recap
24	December 1	Seattle	3–4	Detroit	SO	Greiss	18,963	12–9–3	27
25	December 4	NY Islanders	3–4	Detroit	OT	Nedeljkovic	19,152	13–9–3	29
26	December 7	Nashville	5–2	Detroit		Nedeljkovic	15,539	13–10–3	29
27	December 9	Detroit	2–6	St. Louis		Nedeljkovic	18,096	13–11–3	29
28	December 10	Detroit	3–7	Colorado		Nedeljkovic	18,021	13–12–3	29
29	December 14	NY Islanders	1–2	Detroit		Nedeljkovic	16,884	14–12–3	31
30	December 16	Detroit	3–5	Carolina		Nedeljkovic	16,017	14–13–3	31
31	December 18	New Jersey	2–5	Detroit		Greiss	19,015	15–13–3	33
—	December 20	Colorado		Detroit	Postponed due to the COVID-19 pandemic.
—	December 23	Detroit		Minnesota	Postponed due to the COVID-19 pandemic.
—	December 27	Detroit		NY Rangers	Postponed due to the COVID-19 pandemic.
—	December 29	Detroit		NY Islanders	Postponed due to the COVID-19 pandemic.
32	December 31	Washington	3–1	Detroit		Greiss	17,721	15–14–3	33

January: 5–6–3 (Home: 3–4–1; Road: 2–2–2)
#	Date	Visitor	Score	Home	OT	Decision	Attendance	Record	Pts	Recap
33	January 2	Boston	5–1	Detroit		Nedeljkovic	17,973	15–15–3	33
34	January 4	San Jose	2–6	Detroit		Nedeljkovic	14,524	16–15–3	35
—	January 6	Detroit		Anaheim	Postponed due to the COVID-19 pandemic.
35	January 8	Detroit	0–4	Los Angeles		Nedeljkovic	17,321	16–16–3	35
36	January 9	Detroit	3–4	Anaheim	SO	Greiss	12,043	16–16–4	36
37	January 11	Detroit	2–3	San Jose	OT	Nedeljkovic	10,489	16–16–5	37
38	January 13	Winnipeg	3–0	Detroit		Nedeljkovic	16,829	16–17–5	37
39	January 15	Buffalo	0–4	Detroit		Nedeljkovic	19,515	17–17–5	39
40	January 17	Detroit	3–2	Buffalo	OT	Nedeljkovic	8,839	18–17–5	41
—	January 18	Detroit		Philadelphia	Postponed due to the COVID-19 pandemic.
41	January 21	Dallas	5–4	Detroit	OT	Nedeljkovic	18,522	18–17–6	42
42	January 22	Detroit	1–4	Nashville		Nedeljkovic	17,455	18–18–6	42
43	January 26	Chicago	8–5	Detroit		Pickard	16,578	18–19–6	42
44	January 28	Detroit	3–2	Pittsburgh	SO	Pickard	18,369	19–19–6	44
45	January 29	Toronto	7–4	Detroit		Nedeljkovic	19,515	19–20–6	44
46	January 31	Anaheim	1–2	Detroit	OT	Nedeljkovic	14,545	20–20–6	46

February: 3–4–0 (Home: 1–3–0; Road: 2–1–0)
#	Date	Visitor	Score	Home	OT	Decision	Attendance	Record	Pts	Recap
47	February 2	Los Angeles	5–3	Detroit		Nedeljkovic	11,553	20–21–6	46
48	February 9	Detroit	6–3	Philadelphia		Nedeljkovic	13,243	21–21–6	48
49	February 12	Philadelphia	2–4	Detroit		Greiss	15,965	22–21–6	50
50	February 14	Detroit	4–7	Minnesota		Nedeljkovic	18,098	22–22–6	50
51	February 17	Detroit	3–2	NY Rangers	SO	Greiss	16,461	23–22–6	52
52	February 23	Colorado	5–2	Detroit		Greiss	18,562	23–23–6	52
53	February 26	Toronto	10–7	Detroit		Nedeljkovic	18,791	23–24–6	52

March: 3–8–3 (Home: 2–1–3; Road: 1–7–0)
#	Date	Visitor	Score	Home	OT	Decision	Attendance	Record	Pts	Recap
54	March 1	Carolina	3–4	Detroit	OT	Nedeljkovic	14,874	24–24–6	54
55	March 4	Detroit	1–3	Tampa Bay		Nedeljkovic	19,092	24–25–6	54
56	March 5	Detroit	2–6	Florida		Greiss	15,890	24–26–6	54
57	March 8	Arizona	9–2	Detroit		Nedeljkovic	14,621	24–27–6	54
58	March 10	Minnesota	6–5	Detroit	SO	Nedeljkovic	17,461	24–27–7	55
59	March 12	Detroit	0–3	Calgary		Greiss	17,658	24–28–7	55
60	March 15	Detroit	5–7	Edmonton		Nedeljkovic	15,311	24–29–7	55
61	March 17	Detroit	1–0	Vancouver		Nedeljkovic	18,893	25–29–7	57
62	March 19	Detroit	2–4	Seattle		Nedeljkovic	17,151	25–30–7	57
63	March 22	Philadelphia	3–6	Detroit		Nedeljkovic	15,521	26–30–7	59
64	March 24	Detroit	2–5	NY Islanders		Greiss	16,429	26–31–7	59
65	March 26	Tampa Bay	2–1	Detroit	OT	Nedeljkovic	19,515	26–31–8	60
66	March 27	Detroit	2–11	Pittsburgh		Nedeljkovic	17,842	26–32–8	60
67	March 30	NY Rangers	4–5	Detroit	OT	Nedeljkovic	16,375	26–32–9	61

April: 6–8–1 (Home: 1–4–1; Road: 5–4–0)
#	Date	Visitor	Score	Home	OT	Decision	Attendance	Record	Pts	Recap
68	April 1	Ottawa	5–2	Detroit		Nedeljkovic	17,563	26–33–9	61
69	April 3	Detroit	2–5	Ottawa		Greiss	16,402	26–34–9	61
70	April 5	Boston	3–5	Detroit		Nedeljkovic	15,734	27–34–9	63
71	April 6	Detroit	3–1	Winnipeg		Greiss	13,484	28–34–9	65
72	April 9	Columbus	5–4	Detroit	OT	Nedeljkovic	19,515	28–34–10	66
73	April 12	Ottawa	4–1	Detroit		Greiss	16,093	28–35–10	66
74	April 14	Detroit	3–0	Carolina		Nedeljkovic	17,811	29–35–10	68
75	April 16	Detroit	0–4	NY Rangers		Greiss	18,006	29–36–10	68
76	April 17	Florida	6–1	Detroit		Nedeljkovic	14,566	29–37–10	68
77	April 19	Detroit	4–3	Tampa Bay		Greiss	19,092	30–37–10	70
78	April 21	Detroit	2–5	Florida		Nedeljkovic	16,238	30–38–10	70
79	April 23	Pittsburgh	7–2	Detroit		Greiss	19,515	30–39–10	70
80	April 24	Detroit	3–0	New Jersey		Nedeljkovic	11,492	31–39–10	72
81	April 26	Detroit	0–3	Toronto		Nedeljkovic	18,107	31–40–10	72
82	April 29	Detroit	5–3	New Jersey		Hellberg	14,597	32–40–10	74

Legend: Win (2 points) Loss (0 points) Overtime/shootout loss (1 point)

== Awards and honours ==
=== Awards ===
Regular season
Player	Award	Awarded
Moritz Seider	NHL Rookie of the Month	October 2021
Lucas Raymond	NHL Rookie of the Month	November 2021
Dylan Larkin	NHL First Star of the Week	December 20, 2021

=== Milestones ===
Regular season
Player	Milestone	Reached
Lucas Raymond	1st career NHL game 1st career NHL point 1st career NHL assist	October 14, 2021
Moritz Seider	1st career NHL game 1st career NHL point 1st career NHL assist	October 14, 2021
Lucas Raymond	1st career NHL goal	October 19, 2021
Marc Staal	200th career NHL point	October 19, 2021
Lucas Raymond	1st career NHL hat-trick	October 24, 2021
Moritz Seider	1st career NHL goal	November 6, 2021
Danny DeKeyser	500th career NHL game	November 7, 2021
Sam Gagner	900th career NHL game	November 9, 2021
Filip Zadina	100th career NHL game	November 9, 2021
Dylan Larkin	300th career NHL point	November 13, 2021
Chase Pearson	1st career NHL game	March 24, 2022

== Player statistics ==
=== Skaters ===
Regular season
Player	GP	G	A	Pts	+/−	PIM
Dylan Larkin	71	31	38	69	–18	47
Tyler Bertuzzi	68	30	32	62	–11	47
Lucas Raymond	82	23	34	57	–32	16
Moritz Seider	82	7	43	50	–9	34
Filip Hronek	78	5	33	38	–29	36
Pius Suter	82	15	21	36	–11	22
Sam Gagner	81	13	18	31	–4	32
Robby Fabbri	66	17	13	30	–23	35
Michael Rasmussen	80	15	12	27	–25	66
Vladislav Namestnikov‡	60	13	12	25	+1	34
Filip Zadina	74	10	14	24	–24	10
Jakub Vrana	26	13	6	19	–8	16
Adam Erne	79	6	13	19	–22	34
Nick Leddy‡	55	1	15	16	–33	16
Marc Staal	71	3	13	16	-1	28
Joe Veleno	66	8	7	15	–14	22
Gustav Lindstrom	63	1	12	13	–12	22
Danny DeKeyser	59	0	11	11	–8	26
Oskar Sundqvist†	18	4	4	8	1	17
Jordan Oesterle	45	2	6	8	–7	4
Givani Smith	46	4	3	7	–6	108
Carter Rowney	26	4	2	6	–4	0
Mitchell Stephens	27	0	6	6	–8	8
Taro Hirose	15	1	3	4	–5	4
Jake Walman†	19	0	4	4	–6	4
Kyle Criscuolo	6	0	2	2	+1	2
Gemel Smith	3	0	1	1	–2	5
Troy Stecher‡	16	1	1	2	–6	9
Olli Juolevi†	8	0	0	0	–1	4
Dan Renouf	4	0	0	0	–2	7
Riley Barber	2	0	0	0	+1	0
Turner Elson	2	0	0	0	–1	0

=== Goaltenders ===
Regular season
Player	GP	GS	TOI	W	L	OT	GA	GAA	SA	SV%	SO	G	A	PIM
Magnus Hellberg	1	1	60	1	0	0	3	3.00	20	.870	0	0	0	0
Alex Nedeljkovic	59	52	3,231	20	24	9	178	3.31	1,618	.901	4	0	0	0
Thomas Greiss	31	28	1,508	10	15	1	92	3.66	750	.891	0	0	0	0
Calvin Pickard	3	1	126	1	1	0	9	4.29	72	.875	0	0	0	0

^{†}Denotes player spent time with another team before joining the Red Wings. Stats reflect time with the Red Wings only.
^{‡}Denotes player was traded mid-season. Stats reflect time with the Red Wings only.
Bold/italics denotes franchise record.

== Transactions ==
The Red Wings have been involved in the following transactions during the 2021–22 season.

=== Trades ===
Date	Details		Ref
July 16, 2021	To New York Islanders Richard Panik; 2nd-round pick in 2021	To Detroit Red Wings Nick Leddy	
July 22, 2021	To Carolina Hurricanes Jonathan Bernier; 3rd-round pick in 2021	To Detroit Red Wings Alex Nedeljkovic	
July 30, 2021	To Tampa Bay Lightning 6th-round pick in 2022	To Detroit Red Wings Mitchell Stephens	
March 20, 2022	To Los Angeles Kings Troy Stecher	To Detroit Red Wings 7th-round pick in 2022	
March 21, 2022	To St. Louis Blues Nick Leddy; Luke Witkowski	To Detroit Red Wings Oskar Sundqvist; Jake Walman; 2nd-round pick in 2023	
March 21, 2022	To Dallas Stars Vladislav Namestnikov	To Detroit Red Wings 4th-round pick in 2024	

=== Free agents ===
Date	Player	Team	Contract term	Ref
July 28, 2021	Luke Glendening	to Dallas Stars	2-year	
July 28, 2021	Joe Hicketts	to Minnesota Wild	2-year	
July 28, 2021	Jordan Oesterle	from Arizona Coyotes	2-year	
July 28, 2021	Dominic Turgeon	to Minnesota Wild	1-year	
July 28, 2021	Alex Biega	to Toronto Maple Leafs	1-year	
July 28, 2021	Pius Suter	from Chicago Blackhawks	2-year	
July 28, 2021	Dylan McIlrath	to Washington Capitals	2-year	
July 28, 2021	Ryan Murphy	from Henderson Silver Knights	1-year	
July 29, 2021	Darren Helm	to Colorado Avalanche	1-year	
July 29, 2021	Dan Renouf	from Colorado Avalanche	1-year	
July 29, 2021	Luke Witkowski	from Syracuse Crunch	2-year	
July 30, 2021	Brian Lashoff	from Tampa Bay Lightning	1-year	
August 20, 2021	Kevin Boyle	to HC Bolzano	1-year	
August 24, 2021	Valtteri Filppula	to Geneve-Servette HC	1-year	
September 2, 2021	Carter Rowney	from Anaheim Ducks	1-year	
October 13, 2021	Evgeny Svechnikov	to Winnipeg Jets	1-year	
April 13, 2022	Magnus Hellberg	from HC Sochi	1-year	
April 25, 2022	Turner Elson	from Grand Rapids Griffins	1-year	
May 16, 2022	Pontus Andreasson	from Lulea HF	1-year	
May 22, 2022	Steven Kampfer	from Ak Bars Kazan	1-year	
May 25, 2022	Brian Lashoff	to Grand Rapids Griffins	1-year	
June 29, 2022	Ryan Murphy	to Salavat Yulaev Ufa	1-year	

=== Contract terminations ===
Date	Player	Via	Ref
August 19, 2021	Frans Nielsen	Buyout	

=== Waivers ===
Date	Player	Team	Ref
January 19, 2022	Gemel Smith	from Tampa Bay Lightning	
February 19, 2022	Gemel Smith	to Tampa Bay Lightning	
March 7, 2022	Olli Juolevi	from Florida Panthers	

=== Signings ===
Date	Player	Contract term	Ref
July 22, 2021	Michael Rasmussen	3-year	
July 22, 2021	Alex Nedeljkovic	2-year	
July 25, 2021	Marc Staal	1-year	
July 26, 2021	Gustav Lindstrom	2-year	
July 27, 2021	Taro Hirose	1-year	
July 28, 2021	Sam Gagner	1-year	
July 28, 2021	Calvin Pickard	1-year	
July 31, 2021	Tyler Bertuzzi	2-year	
August 5, 2021	Chase Pearson	1-year	
August 10, 2021	Jakub Vrana	3-year	
August 15, 2021	Adam Erne	2-year	
September 3, 2021	Filip Hronek	3-year	
September 14, 2021	Givani Smith	2-year	
December 13, 2021	Robby Fabbri	3-year	
March 16, 2022	Cross Hanas	3-year	
April 24, 2022	Simon Edvinsson	3-year	
May 21, 2022	Taro Hirose	2-year	
June 9, 2022	Elmer Soderblom	3-year	
June 24, 2022	Victor Brattstrom	1-year	

== Draft picks ==
Below are the Detroit Red Wings' selections at the 2021 NHL entry draft, which will be held on July 23 and 24, 2021, virtually via video conference call from the NHL Network studios in Secaucus, New Jersey, due to the COVID-19 pandemic.

Round	#	Player	Pos	Nationality	College/Junior/Club team (League)
1	6	Simon Edvinsson	D	Sweden	Frölunda HC (SHL)
1	15^{1}	Sebastian Cossa	G	Canada	Edmonton Oil Kings (WHL)
2	36^{2}	Shai Buium	D	United States	Sioux City Musketeers (USHL)
3	70	Carter Mazur	LW	United States	Tri-City Storm (USHL)
4	114^{3}	Redmond Savage	C	United States	U.S. NTDP (USHL)
5	134	Liam Dower Nilsson	C	Sweden	Frölunda HC (J20 SuperElit)
5	155^{4}	Oscar Plandowski	D	Canada	Charlottetown Islanders (QMJHL)
6	166	Pasquale Zito	LW	Canada	Windsor Spitfires (OHL)

Notes:

1. The Dallas Stars' first-round pick went to the Detroit Red Wings as the result of a trade on July 23, 2021, that sent a first-round pick in 2021, a second-round pick in 2021, and a fifth-round pick in 2021 in exchange for this pick.
2. The Vegas Golden Knights' second-round pick went to the Detroit Red Wings as the result of a trade on July 24, 2021, that sent a second-round pick in 2021, and a fourth-round pick in 2021 in exchange for this pick.
3. The Vegas Golden Knights' fourth-round pick went to the Detroit Red Wings as the result of a trade on July 24, 2021, that sent a fourth-round pick in 2021 in exchange for this pick.
4. The Vegas Golden Knights' fifth-round pick went to the Detroit Red Wings as the result of a trade on July 24, 2021, that sent a fourth-round pick in 2021 in exchange for this pick.
