= 2021–22 Winnipeg Jets season =

National Hockey League season

2021–22 Winnipeg Jets
- Division: 6th Central
- Conference: 11th Western
- 2021–22 record: 39–32–11
- Home record: 23–15–3
- Road record: 16–17–8
- Goals for: 252
- Goals against: 257

Team information
- General manager: Kevin Cheveldayoff
- Coach: Paul Maurice (Oct. 13 – Dec. 17); Dave Lowry (interim, Dec. 17 – May 1)
- Captain: Blake Wheeler
- Alternate captains: Josh Morrissey; Mark Scheifele
- Arena: Canada Life Centre
- Average attendance: 12,716
- Minor league affiliate: Manitoba Moose (AHL)

Team leaders
- Goals: Kyle Connor (47)
- Assists: Kyle Connor (46)
- Points: Kyle Connor (93)
- Penalty minutes: Pierre-Luc Dubois (106)
- Plus/minus: Nikolaj Ehlers (+18)
- Wins: Connor Hellebuyck (29)
- Goals against average: Eric Comrie (2.58)

The 2021–22 Winnipeg Jets season was the 39th season of play for the National Hockey League (NHL) franchise that was established on June 22, 1979, 47th season for the organization overall, and the 11th in Winnipeg, since the franchise relocated from Atlanta prior to the start of the 2011–12 NHL season.

After spending the 2020–21 season in the all-Canadian North Division, the Jets returned to the Central Division for the 2021–22 season. The Jets were eliminated from playoff contention on April 20, 2022, after the Vegas Golden Knights defeated the Washington Capitals 4–3 in overtime.

== Standings ==
=== Divisional standings ===
Central Division
Pos	Team	GP	W	L	OTL	RW	GF	GA	GD	Pts
1	z – Colorado Avalanche	82	56	19	7	46	312	234	+78	119
2	x – Minnesota Wild	82	53	22	7	37	310	253	+57	113
3	x – St. Louis Blues	82	49	22	11	43	311	242	+69	109
4	x – Dallas Stars	82	46	30	6	31	238	246	−8	98
5	x – Nashville Predators	82	45	30	7	35	266	252	+14	97
6	Winnipeg Jets	82	39	32	11	31	252	257	−5	89
7	Chicago Blackhawks	82	28	42	12	16	219	291	−72	68
8	Arizona Coyotes	82	25	50	7	18	207	313	−106	57

Source: National Hockey League
Rules for classification: 1) Fewer number of games played (GP, only during regular season); 2) Greater number of regulation wins (RW); 3) Greater number of wins in regulation and overtime, excluding shootout wins (ROW); 4) Greater number of total wins, including shootouts (W); 5) Greater number of points earned in head-to-head play; if teams played an uneven number of head-to-head games, the result of the first game on the home ice of the team with the extra home game is discarded; 6) Greater goal differential (GD); 7) Greater number of goals scored (GF)
x – Clinched playoff spot; z – Clinched conference

=== Conference standings ===
Western Conference Wild Card
Pos	Div	Team	GP	W	L	OTL	RW	GF	GA	GD	Pts
1	CE	x – Dallas Stars	82	46	30	6	31	238	246	−8	98
2	CE	x – Nashville Predators	82	45	30	7	35	266	252	+14	97
3	PA	Vegas Golden Knights	82	43	31	8	34	266	248	+18	94
4	PA	Vancouver Canucks	82	40	30	12	32	249	236	+13	92
5	CE	Winnipeg Jets	82	39	32	11	32	252	257	−5	89
6	PA	San Jose Sharks	82	32	37	13	22	214	264	−50	77
7	PA	Anaheim Ducks	82	31	37	14	22	232	271	−39	76
8	CE	Chicago Blackhawks	82	28	42	12	16	219	291	−72	68
9	PA	Seattle Kraken	82	27	49	6	23	216	285	−69	60
10	CE	Arizona Coyotes	82	25	50	7	18	207	313	−106	57

Source: National Hockey League
Rules for classification: 1) Fewer number of games played (GP, only during regular season); 2) Greater number of regulation wins (RW); 3) Greater number of wins in regulation and overtime, excluding shootout wins (ROW); 4) Greater number of total wins, including shootouts (W); 5) Greater number of points earned in head-to-head play; if teams played an uneven number of head-to-head games, the result of the first game on the home ice of the team with the extra home game is discarded; 6) Greater goal differential (GD); 7) Greater number of goals scored (GF)
x – Clinched playoff spot

== Schedule and results ==
=== Preseason ===
2021 preseason: 2–3–1 (home: 2–0–1; road: 0–3–0)

Game	Date	Opponent	Score	OT	Decision	Location	Attendance	Record	Recap
1	September 26	Ottawa Senators	2–3	OT	Comrie	Canada Life Centre		0–0–1	
2	September 29	Edmonton Oilers	5–1		Hellebuyck	Canada Life Centre		1–0–1	
3	October 2	@ Edmonton Oilers	3–4		Comrie	Rogers Place	15,206	1–1–1	
4	October 3	@ Vancouver Canucks	2–3		Berdin	Rogers Arena	9,108	1–2–1	
5	October 6	Calgary Flames	3–4		Hellebuyck	Canada Life Centre		2–2–1	
6	October 8	@ Calgary Flames	3–4		Hellebuyck	Scotiabank Saddledome	14,065	2–3–1	

=== Regular season ===
2021–22 game log
October: 4–2–2 (home: 2–0–0; road: 2–2–2)

Game	Date	Opponent	Score	OT	Decision	Location	Attendance	Record	Points	Recap
1	October 13	@ Anaheim Ducks	1–4		Hellebuyck	Honda Center	16,260	0–0–1	0	
2	October 16	@ San Jose Sharks	3–4		Hellebuyck	SAP Center	16,137	0–1–1	0	
3	October 19	@ Minnesota Wild	5–6	OT	Hellebuyck	Xcel Energy Center	18,156	0–2–1	1	
4	October 21	Anaheim Ducks	5–1		Hellebuyck	Canada Life Centre	13,886	1–2–1	3	
5	October 23	Nashville Predators	6–4		Hellebuyck	Canada Life Centre	14,020	2–2–1	5	
6	October 26	@ Anaheim Ducks	4–3		Hellebuyck	Honda Center	11,951	3–2–1	7	
7	October 28	@ Los Angeles Kings	3–2		Comrie	Staples Center	11,207	4–2–1	9	
8	October 30	@ San Jose Sharks	1–2	OT	Hellebuyck	SAP Center	11,845	4–2–2	10	

November: 6–6–2 (home: 5–3–1; road: 1–3–1)

Game	Date	Opponent	Score	OT	Decision	Location	Attendance	Record	Points	Recap
9	November 2	Dallas Stars	4–3	SO	Comrie	Canada Life Centre	13,174	5–2–2	12	
10	November 5	Chicago Blackhawks	5–1		Comrie	Canada Life Centre	13,756	6–2–2	14	
11	November 6	New York Islanders	0–2		Comrie	Canada Life Centre	13,424	6–3–2	14	
12	November 9	St. Louis Blues	2–3	SO	Hellebuyck	Canada Life Centre	14,004	6–3–3	15	
13	November 11	San Jose Sharks	4–1		Hellebuyck	Canada Life Centre	14,229	7–3–3	17	
14	November 13	Los Angeles Kings	3–2	OT	Hellebuyck	Canada Life Centre	13,776	8–3–3	19	
15	November 16	Edmonton Oilers	5–2		Hellebuyck	Canada Life Centre	13,473	9–3–3	21	
16	November 18	@ Edmonton Oilers	1–2	SO	Hellebuyck	Rogers Place	15,273	9–3–4	22	
17	November 19	@ Vancouver Canucks	2–3		Comrie	Rogers Arena	18,628	9–4–4	22	
18	November 22	Pittsburgh Penguins	1–3		Hellebuyck	Canada Life Centre	13,570	9–5–4	22	
19	November 24	@ Columbus Blue Jackets	0–3		Hellebuyck	Nationwide Arena	15,733	9–6–4	22	
20	November 26	@ Minnesota Wild	1–7		Hellebuyck	Xcel Energy Center	19,113	9–7–4	22	
21	November 27	@ Calgary Flames	4–2		Hellebuyck	Scotiabank Saddledome	17,036	10–7–4	24	
22	November 29	Arizona Coyotes	0–1		Hellebuyck	Canada Life Centre	14,129	10–8–4	24	

December: 4–3–1 (home: 3–3–0; road: 1–0–1)

Game	Date	Opponent	Score	OT	Decision	Location	Attendance	Record	Points	Recap
23	December 3	New Jersey Devils	8–4		Hellebuyck	Canada Life Centre	13,844	11–8–4	26	
24	December 5	Toronto Maple Leafs	6–3		Hellebuyck	Canada Life Centre	14,461	12–8–4	28	
25	December 7	Carolina Hurricanes	2–4		Hellebuyck	Canada Life Centre	13,761	12–9–4	28	
26	December 9	@ Seattle Kraken	3–0		Hellebuyck	Climate Pledge Arena	17,151	13–9–4	30	
27	December 10	@ Vancouver Canucks	3–4	SO	Comrie	Rogers Arena	18,457	13–9–5	31	
28	December 14	Buffalo Sabres	2–4		Hellebuyck	Canada Life Centre	13,484	13–10–5	31	
29	December 17	Washington Capitals	2–5		Hellebuyck	Canada Life Centre	14,039	13–11–5	31	
30	December 19	St. Louis Blues	4–2		Hellebuyck	Canada Life Centre	13,524	14–11–5	33	
—	December 21	@ Nashville Predators	Postponed due to COVID-19. Moved to February 12.							
—	December 22	@ Dallas Stars	Postponed due to COVID-19. Moved to February 11.							
—	December 27	Minnesota Wild	Postponed due to COVID-19. Moved to February 8.							
—	December 29	Chicago Blackhawks	Postponed due to COVID-19. Moved to February 14.							
—	December 31	@ Calgary Flames	Postponed due to COVID-19 attendance restrictions. Moved to February 21.							

January: 4–5–2 (home: 0–2–0; road: 4–3–2)

Game	Date	Opponent	Score	OT	Decision	Location	Attendance	Record	Points	Recap
31	January 2	@ Vegas Golden Knights	5–4	OT	Hellebuyck	T-Mobile Arena	17,888	15–11–5	35	
32	January 4	@ Arizona Coyotes	3–1		Hellebuyck	Gila River Arena	8,173	16–11–5	37	
33	January 6	@ Colorado Avalanche	1–7		Hellebuyck	Ball Arena	15,171	16–12–5	37	
—	January 8	Seattle Kraken	Postponed due to COVID-19 attendance restrictions. Moved to February 17.							
—	January 10	Minnesota Wild	Postponed due to COVID-19 attendance restrictions. Moved to February 16.							
34	January 13	@ Detroit Red Wings	3–0		Hellebuyck	Little Caesars Arena	16,829	17–12–5	39	
—	January 15	Ottawa Senators	Postponed due to COVID-19 attendance restrictions. Moved to March 24.							
—	January 16	Edmonton Oilers	Postponed due to COVID-19. Moved to February 19.							
35	January 18	@ Washington Capitals	3–4	OT	Hellebuyck	Capital One Arena	18,573	17–12–6	40	
36	January 20	@ Nashville Predators	2–5		Hellebuyck	Bridgestone Arena	17,159	17–13–6	40	
37	January 22	@ Boston Bruins	2–3		Hellebuyck	TD Garden	17,850	17–14–6	40	
38	January 23	@ Pittsburgh Penguins	2–3	SO	Hellebuyck	PPG Paints Arena	17,962	17–14–7	41	
39	January 25	Florida Panthers	3–5		Hellebuyck	Canada Life Centre	250	17–15–7	41	
40	January 27	Vancouver Canucks	1–5		Hellebuyck	Canada Life Centre	250	17–16–7	41	
41	January 29	@ St. Louis Blues	4–1		Comrie	Enterprise Center	18,096	18–16–7	43	

February: 5–5–2 (home: 3–2–0; road: 2–3–2)

Game	Date	Opponent	Score	OT	Decision	Location	Attendance	Record	Points	Recap
42	February 1	@ Philadelphia Flyers	1–3		Hellebuyck	Wells Fargo Center	13,433	18–17–7	43	
43	February 8	Minnesota Wild	2–0		Hellebuyck	Canada Life Centre	7,012	19–17–7	45	
44	February 11	@ Dallas Stars	3–4	OT	Hellebuyck	American Airlines Center	18,014	19–17–8	46	
45	February 12	@ Nashville Predators	5–2		Hellebuyck	Bridgestone Arena	17,688	20–17–8	48	
46	February 14	Chicago Blackhawks	1–3		Hellebuyck	Canada Life Centre	7,511	20–18–8	48	
47	February 16	Minnesota Wild	6–3		Hellebuyck	Canada Life Centre	12,527	21–18–8	50	
48	February 17	Seattle Kraken	5–3		Comrie	Canada Life Centre	13,071	22–18–8	52	
49	February 19	Edmonton Oilers	2–4		Hellebuyck	Canada Life Centre	12,360	22–19–8	52	
50	February 21	@ Calgary Flames	1–3		Hellebuyck	Scotiabank Saddledome	9,639	22–20–8	52	
51	February 23	@ Dallas Stars	2–3	OT	Hellebuyck	American Airlines Center	10,098	22–20–9	53	
52	February 25	@ Colorado Avalanche	3–6		Hellebuyck	Ball Arena	18,037	22–21–9	53	
53	February 27	@ Arizona Coyotes	5–3		Comrie	Gila River Arena	10,152	23–21–9	55	

March: 10–5–1 (home: 6–3–1; road: 4–2–0)

Game	Date	Opponent	Score	OT	Decision	Location	Attendance	Record	Points	Recap
54	March 1	Montreal Canadiens	8–4		Hellebuyck	Canada Life Centre	13,816	24–21–9	57	
55	March 4	Dallas Stars	3–4	OT	Hellebuyck	Canada Life Centre	13,466	24–21–10	58	
56	March 6	New York Rangers	1–4		Hellebuyck	Canada Life Centre	12,867	24–22–10	58	
57	March 8	Tampa Bay Lightning	7–4		Hellebuyck	Canada Life Centre	12,925	25–22–10	60	
58	March 10	@ New Jersey Devils	2–1		Comrie	Prudential Center	12,377	26–22–10	62	
59	March 11	@ New York Islanders	2–5		Hellebuyck	UBS Arena	17,255	26–23–10	62	
60	March 13	@ St. Louis Blues	4–3	OT	Hellebuyck	Enterprise Center	18,096	27–23–10	64	
61	March 15	Vegas Golden Knights	7–3		Hellebuyck	Canada Life Centre	13,470	28–23–10	66	
62	March 18	Boston Bruins	2–4		Hellebuyck	Canada Life Centre	14,191	28–24–10	66	
63	March 20	@ Chicago Blackhawks	6–4		Hellebuyck	United Center	19,251	29–24–10	68	
64	March 22	Vegas Golden Knights	4–0		Hellebuyck	Canada Life Centre	13,690	30–24–10	70	
64	March 24	Ottawa Senators	2–5		Hellebuyck	Canada Life Centre	14,175	30–25–10	70	
66	March 25	Columbus Blue Jackets	4–3	OT	Comrie	Canada Life Centre	13,475	31–25–10	72	
67	March 27	Arizona Coyotes	2–1	OT	Hellebuyck	Canada Life Centre	13,825	32–25–10	74	
68	March 30	@ Buffalo Sabres	3–2	SO	Hellebuyck	KeyBank Center	8,055	33–25–10	76	
69	March 31	@ Toronto Maple Leafs	3–7		Comrie	Scotiabank Arena	18,517	33–26–10	76	

April: 5–6–1 (home: 3–2–1; road: 2–4–0)

Game	Date	Opponent	Score	OT	Decision	Location	Attendance	Record	Points	Recap
70	April 2	Los Angeles Kings	2–3		Hellebuyck	Canada Life Centre	14,067	33–27–10	76	
71	April 6	Detroit Red Wings	1–3		Hellebuyck	Canada Life Centre	13,484	33–28–10	76	
72	April 8	Colorado Avalanche	4–5	OT	Hellebuyck	Canada Life Centre	13,900	33–28–11	77	
73	April 10	@ Ottawa Senators	4–3		Hellebuyck	Canadian Tire Centre	12,207	34–28–11	79	
74	April 11	@ Montreal Canadiens	4–2		Hellebuyck	Bell Centre	20,728	35–28–11	81	
—	April 13	Seattle Kraken	Postponed to May 1 due to weather.							
75	April 15	@ Florida Panthers	1–6		Hellebuyck	FLA Live Arena	17,625	35–29–11	81	
76	April 16	@ Tampa Bay Lightning	4–7		Hellebuyck	Amalie Arena	19,092	35–30–11	81	
77	April 19	@ New York Rangers	0–3		Comrie	Madison Square Garden	18,006	35–31–11	81	
78	April 21	@ Carolina Hurricanes	2–4		Comrie	PNC Arena	17,587	35–32–11	81	
79	April 24	Colorado Avalanche	4–1		Hellebuyck	Canada Life Centre	14,443	36–32–11	83	
80	April 27	Philadelphia Flyers	4–0		Comrie	Canada Life Centre	13,383	37–32–11	85	
81	April 29	Calgary Flames	3–1		Hellebuyck	Canada Life Centre	14,202	38–32–11	87	

May: 1–0–0 (home: 1–0–0; road: 0–0–0)

Game	Date	Opponent	Score	OT	Decision	Location	Attendance	Record	Points	Recap
82	May 1	Seattle Kraken	4–3		Hellebuyck	Canada Life Centre	14,443	39–32–11	89	

2021–22 schedule

Win (2 Points) Loss (0 points) Overtime/shootout loss (1 point)

== Player statistics ==
=== Skaters ===
Regular season
Player	GP	G	A	Pts	+/−	PIM
Kyle Connor	79	47	46	93	−3	4
Mark Scheifele	67	29	41	70	−17	23
Pierre-Luc Dubois	81	28	32	60	−6	106
Blake Wheeler	65	17	43	60	−15	36
Nikolaj Ehlers	62	28	27	55	+18	20
Paul Stastny	71	21	24	45	+14	14
Josh Morrissey	79	12	25	37	−3	66
Andrew Copp^{‡}	56	13	22	35	+2	8
Neal Pionk	77	3	31	34	+5	46
Nate Schmidt	77	4	28	32	−4	10
Adam Lowry	79	13	8	21	+1	59
Brenden Dillon	79	3	17	20	+16	67
Evgeny Svechnikov	72	7	12	19	−4	38
Dominic Toninato	77	7	7	14	+1	22
Jansen Harkins	77	7	6	13	−8	15
Dylan DeMelo	76	1	12	13	+10	28
Logan Stanley	58	1	12	13	+1	44
Cole Perfetti	18	2	5	7	+1	0
Dylan Samberg	15	0	5	5	+3	4
Ville Heinola	12	0	5	5	−2	10
Mason Appleton^{†}	19	2	2	4	+3	16
Morgan Barron^{†}	14	2	2	4	−3	4
Nathan Beaulieu	24	0	4	4	−7	25
Zach Sanford^{†}	18	0	4	4	−2	13
Kristian Vesalainen	53	2	1	3	−8	6
Kristian Reichel	13	1	1	2	−2	7
Riley Nash^{‡}	15	0	0	0	−1	4
Austin Poganski	16	0	0	0	−3	7
C. J. Suess	3	0	0	0	0	2
Adam Brooks^{†}	14	0	0	0	0	0
Michael Eyssimont	1	0	0	0	0	0
Johnathan Kovacevic	4	0	0	0	+1	2
Declan Chisholm	2	0	0	0	+1	0
David Gustafsson	2	0	0	0	0	0
Jeff Malott	1	0	0	0	0	2

=== Goaltenders ===
Regular season
Player	GP	GS	TOI	W	L	OT	GA	GAA	SA	SV%	SO	G	A	PIM
Connor Hellebuyck	66	66	3,903:30	29	27	10	193	2.97	2,155	.910	4	0	2	0
Eric Comrie	19	16	1,024:49	10	5	1	44	2.58	550	.920	1	0	1	0

^{†}Denotes player spent time with another team before joining the Jets. Stats reflect time with the Jets only.
^{‡}Denotes player was traded mid-season. Stats reflect time with the Jets only.

== Transactions ==
The Jets have been involved in the following transactions during the 2020–21 season.

=== Trades ===
Date	Details		Ref
July 26, 2021	To Washington Capitals 2nd-round pick in 2022; 2nd-round pick in 2023	To Winnipeg Jets Brenden Dillon	
July 27, 2021	To Vancouver Canucks 3rd-round pick in 2022	To Winnipeg Jets Nate Schmidt	
March 20, 2022	To Seattle Kraken 4th-round pick in 2023	To Winnipeg Jets Mason Appleton	
March 21, 2022	To Pittsburgh Penguins Nathan Beaulieu	To Winnipeg Jets Conditional^{1} 7th-round pick in 2022	
March 21, 2022	To Arizona Coyotes Bryan Little; Nathan Smith	To Winnipeg Jets 4th-round pick in 2022	
March 21, 2022	To New York Rangers Andrew Copp; 6th-round pick in 2023	To Winnipeg Jets Morgan Barron; Conditional^{2} 2nd-round pick in 2022; Conditional^{3} STL 2nd-round pick in 2022; 5th-round pick in 2023	
March 21, 2022	To Los Angeles Kings Nelson Nogier	To Winnipeg Jets Markus Phillips	
March 21, 2022	To Ottawa Senators 5th-round pick in 2022	To Winnipeg Jets Zach Sanford	

Notes:

1. Pittsburgh receives the pick if they reach the 2022 Stanley Cup Finals and Beaulieu plays in at least 50% of the playoff games.
2. Winnipeg will instead receive a 1st-round pick in 2022 if New York wins 2 playoff rounds and Copp plays in 50% of the playoff games.
3. Winnipeg can choose to receive St. Louis' 2nd-round pick in 2022 or New York's 2nd-round pick in 2023.

=== Players acquired ===
Date	Player	Former team	Term	Via	Ref
July 28, 2021	Michael Eyssimont	Los Angeles Kings	2-year	Free agency	
July 28, 2021	Luke Johnson	Minnesota Wild	1-year	Free agency	
July 31, 2021	Riley Nash	Toronto Maple Leafs	1-year	Free agency	
July 31, 2021	Austin Poganski	St. Louis Blues	1-year	Free agency	
October 13, 2021	Evgeny Svechnikov	Detroit Red Wings	1-year	Free agency	
February 18, 2022	Adam Brooks	Toronto Maple Leafs		Waivers	
March 19, 2022	Philippe Desrosiers	Manitoba Moose (AHL)	1-year	Free agency	
April 16, 2022	Wyatt Bongiovanni	Quinnipiac Bobcats (ECAC)	1-year	Free agency	
May 6, 2022	Oskari Salminen	Mikkelin Jukurit (Liiga)	2-year	Free agency	

=== Players lost ===
Date	Player	New team	Term	Via	Ref
July 21, 2021	Mason Appleton	Seattle Kraken		Expansion draft	
July 28, 2021	Laurent Brossoit	Vegas Golden Knights	1-year	Free agency	
July 28, 2021	Derek Forbort	Boston Bruins	3-year	Free agency	
July 28, 2021	Trevor Lewis	Calgary Flames	1-year	Free agency	
July 28, 2021	Tucker Poolman	Vancouver Canucks	4-year	Free agency	
July 28, 2021	Nate Thompson	Philadelphia Flyers	1-year	Free agency	
July 29, 2021	Mathieu Perreault	Montreal Canadiens	1-year	Free agency	
August 4, 2021	Skyler McKenzie	Vasterviks IK (HockeyAllsvenskan)	Unknown	Free agency	
August 27, 2021	Jordie Benn	Minnesota Wild	1-year	Free agency	
September 6, 2021	Marko Dano	HC Ocelari Trinec (ELH)	2-month	Free agency	
September 14, 2021	Joona Luoto			Mutual termination	
September 20, 2021	Sami Niku			Mutual termination	
September 24, 2021	Sami Niku	Montreal Canadiens	1-year	Free agency	
October 8, 2021	Joona Luoto	Tappara (Liiga)	1-year	Free agency	
December 7, 2021	Riley Nash	Tampa Bay Lightning		Waivers	
May 23, 2022	Kristian Vesalainen	Malmö Redhawks (SHL)	1-year	Free agency	

=== Signings ===
Date	Player	Term	Contract type	Ref
July 26, 2021	Paul Stastny	1-year	Re-signing	
July 27, 2021	Eric Comrie	1-year	Re-signing	
August 4, 2021	Logan Stanley	2-year	Re-signing	
August 11, 2021	Neal Pionk	4-year	Re-signing	
August 12, 2021	Andrew Copp	1-year	Re-signing	
August 13, 2021	Johnathan Kovacevic	1-year	Re-signing	
August 15, 2021	Dmitry Kuzmin	3-year	Entry-level	
March 21, 2022	Kristian Reichel	2-year	Extension	
April 11, 2022	Henri Nikkanen	3-year	Entry-level	
April 11, 2022	Daniel Torgersson	3-year	Entry-level	
April 27, 2022	Chaz Lucius	3-year	Entry-level	
May 31, 2022	Tyrel Bauer	3-year	Entry-level	

== Draft picks ==
Below are the Winnipeg Jets' selections at the 2021 NHL entry draft, which were held on July 23 to 24, 2021. It was held virtually via Video conference call from the NHL Network studio in Secaucus, New Jersey.

Round	#	Player	Pos.	Nationality	Team (League)
1	18	Chaz Lucius	C	USA	USNTDP Juniors (USHL)
2	50	Nikita Chibrikov	LW	Russia	SKA Saint Petersburg (KHL)
3	82	Dmitry Kuzmin	D	Belarus	Dinamo-Molodechno (BHL)
5	146	Dmitri Rashevsky	RW	Russia	HC Dinamo Saint Petersburg (VHL)
