= 2021–22 Dallas Stars season =

Season of play of professional ice hockey team

2021–22 Dallas Stars
- Division: 4th Central
- Conference: 7th Western
- 2021–22 record: 46–30–6
- Home record: 27–10–4
- Road record: 19–20–2
- Goals for: 238
- Goals against: 246

Team information
- General manager: Jim Nill
- Coach: Rick Bowness
- Captain: Jamie Benn
- Alternate captains: Blake Comeau (Oct.–Nov.); John Klingberg; Esa Lindell; Joe Pavelski (Nov. – May 15); Tyler Seguin
- Arena: American Airlines Center
- Average attendance: 17,896
- Minor league affiliates: Texas Stars (AHL); Idaho Steelheads (ECHL)

Team leaders
- Goals: Jason Robertson (41)
- Assists: Joe Pavelski (54)
- Points: Joe Pavelski (81)
- Penalty minutes: Jamie Benn (88)
- Plus/minus: Jason Robertson (+16)
- Wins: Jake Oettinger (30)
- Goals against average: Jake Oettinger (2.53)

The 2021–22 Dallas Stars season was the 55th season for National Hockey League franchise that was established on June 5, 1967, and the 29th season since the franchise relocated from Minnesota prior to the start of the 1993–94 NHL season. On April 27, 2022, the Stars clinched a playoff berth despite a 4–3 overtime loss to the Arizona Coyotes. It would be the last time that the Stars failed to make it the Western Conference finals until 2026.

== Standings ==
=== Divisional standings ===
Central Division
Pos	Team	GP	W	L	OTL	RW	GF	GA	GD	Pts
1	z – Colorado Avalanche	82	56	19	7	46	312	234	+78	119
2	x – Minnesota Wild	82	53	22	7	37	310	253	+57	113
3	x – St. Louis Blues	82	49	22	11	43	311	242	+69	109
4	x – Dallas Stars	82	46	30	6	31	238	246	−8	98
5	x – Nashville Predators	82	45	30	7	35	266	252	+14	97
6	Winnipeg Jets	82	39	32	11	31	252	257	−5	89
7	Chicago Blackhawks	82	28	42	12	16	219	291	−72	68
8	Arizona Coyotes	82	25	50	7	18	207	313	−106	57

Source: National Hockey League
Rules for classification: 1) Fewer number of games played (GP, only during regular season); 2) Greater number of regulation wins (RW); 3) Greater number of wins in regulation and overtime, excluding shootout wins (ROW); 4) Greater number of total wins, including shootouts (W); 5) Greater number of points earned in head-to-head play; if teams played an uneven number of head-to-head games, the result of the first game on the home ice of the team with the extra home game is discarded; 6) Greater goal differential (GD); 7) Greater number of goals scored (GF)
x – Clinched playoff spot; z – Clinched conference

=== Conference standings ===
Western Conference Wild Card
Pos	Div	Team	GP	W	L	OTL	RW	GF	GA	GD	Pts
1	CE	x – Dallas Stars	82	46	30	6	31	238	246	−8	98
2	CE	x – Nashville Predators	82	45	30	7	35	266	252	+14	97
3	PA	Vegas Golden Knights	82	43	31	8	34	266	248	+18	94
4	PA	Vancouver Canucks	82	40	30	12	32	249	236	+13	92
5	CE	Winnipeg Jets	82	39	32	11	32	252	257	−5	89
6	PA	San Jose Sharks	82	32	37	13	22	214	264	−50	77
7	PA	Anaheim Ducks	82	31	37	14	22	232	271	−39	76
8	CE	Chicago Blackhawks	82	28	42	12	16	219	291	−72	68
9	PA	Seattle Kraken	82	27	49	6	23	216	285	−69	60
10	CE	Arizona Coyotes	82	25	50	7	18	207	313	−106	57

Source: National Hockey League
Rules for classification: 1) Fewer number of games played (GP, only during regular season); 2) Greater number of regulation wins (RW); 3) Greater number of wins in regulation and overtime, excluding shootout wins (ROW); 4) Greater number of total wins, including shootouts (W); 5) Greater number of points earned in head-to-head play; if teams played an uneven number of head-to-head games, the result of the first game on the home ice of the team with the extra home game is discarded; 6) Greater goal differential (GD); 7) Greater number of goals scored (GF)
x – Clinched playoff spot

== Schedule and results ==
=== Regular season ===
The regular season schedule was published on July 22, 2021 with only about a handful of games scheduled in February because NHL players are planning to participate in the 2022 Winter Olympics. On December 22, 2021, the NHL announced that players would not participate in the Olympics due to the rise of COVID-19 cases worldwide.

2021–22 game log

October: 3–4–1 (home: 1–1–1; road: 2–3–0)
#	Date	Visitor	Score	Home	OT	Decision	Attendance	Record	Pts	Recap
1	October 14	Dallas	3–2	NY Rangers	OT	Khudobin	17,173	1–0–0	2
2	October 16	Dallas	1–3	Boston		Holtby	17,850	1–1–0	2
3	October 17	Dallas	2–3	Ottawa		Khudobin	8,067	1–2–0	2
4	October 19	Dallas	2–1	Pittsburgh	SO	Holtby	16,450	2–2–0	4
5	October 22	Los Angeles	2–3	Dallas	OT	Holtby	18,532	3–2–0	6
6	October 25	Dallas	1–4	Columbus		Holtby	12,629	3–3–0	6
7	October 27	Vegas	3–2	Dallas	OT	Khudobin	18,114	3–3–1	7
8	October 29	Ottawa	4–1	Dallas		Holtby	17,346	3–4–1	7

November: 8–3–1 (home: 6–1–0; road: 2–2–1)
#	Date	Visitor	Score	Home	OT	Decision	Attendance	Record	Pts	Recap
9	November 2	Dallas	3–4	Winnipeg	SO	Holtby	13,174	3–4–2	8
10	November 4	Dallas	4–3	Calgary	OT	Khudobin	14,715	4–4–2	10
11	November 7	Dallas	3–6	Vancouver		Khudobin	18,661	4–5–2	10
12	November 10	Nashville	4–2	Dallas		Holtby	17,560	4–6–2	10
13	November 13	Philadelphia	2–5	Dallas		Khudobin	18,532	5–6–2	12
14	November 16	Detroit	2–5	Dallas		Oettinger	17,764	6–6–2	14
15	November 18	Dallas	2–7	Minnesota		Khudobin	17,088	6–7–2	14
16	November 20	St. Louis	1–4	Dallas		Oettinger	18,532	7–7–2	16
17	November 23	Edmonton	1–4	Dallas		Oettinger	18,532	8–7–2	18
18	November 26	Colorado	1–3	Dallas		Oettinger	18,532	9–7–2	20
19	November 27	Dallas	3–2	Arizona		Holtby	10,839	10–7–2	22
20	November 30	Carolina	1–4	Dallas		Holtby	17,345	11–7–2	24

December: 4–5–0 (home: 4–1–0; road: 0–4–0)
#	Date	Visitor	Score	Home	OT	Decision	Attendance	Record	Pts	Recap
21	December 2	Columbus	2–3	Dallas		Oettinger	17,098	12–7–2	26
22	December 6	Arizona	1–4	Dallas		Holtby	17,256	13–7–2	28
23	December 8	Dallas	4–5	Vegas		Holtby	17,843	13–8–2	28
24	December 9	Dallas	0–4	Los Angeles		Oettinger	13,659	13–9–2	28
25	December 11	Dallas	1–2	San Jose		Holtby	14,145	13–10–2	28
26	December 14	St. Louis	4–1	Dallas		Oettinger	18,012	13–11–2	28
27	December 17	Dallas	1–4	St. Louis		Holtby	16,852	13–12–2	28
28	December 18	Chicago	3–4	Dallas	OT	Oettinger	18,532	14–12–2	30
29	December 20	Minnesota	4–7	Dallas		Oettinger	18,237	15–12–2	32
—	December 22	Winnipeg	–	Dallas	Postponed due to COVID-19. Moved to February 11.
—	December 23	Dallas	–	Chicago	Postponed due to COVID-19. Moved to February 18.
—	December 27	Nashville	–	Dallas	Postponed due to COVID-19. Moved to February 9.
—	December 29	Dallas	–	Colorado	Postponed due to COVID-19. Moved to February 15.
—	December 31	Colorado	–	Dallas	Postponed due to COVID-19. Moved to February 13.

January: 8–5–0 (home: 4–2–0; road: 4–3–0)
#	Date	Visitor	Score	Home	OT	Decision	Attendance	Record	Pts	Recap
—	January 2	Dallas	–	Arizona	Postponed due to COVID-19. Moved to February 20.
30	January 6	Florida	5–6	Dallas	SO	Holtby	17,678	16–12–2	34
31	January 8	Pittsburgh	2–3	Dallas		Oettinger	18,532	17–12–2	36
32	January 9	Dallas	1–2	St. Louis		Holtby	18,096	17–13–2	36
33	January 12	Seattle	2–5	Dallas		Oettinger	17,825	18–13–2	38
34	January 14	Dallas	1–7	Florida		Oettinger	15,022	18–14–2	38
35	January 15	Dallas	1–3	Tampa Bay		Khudobin	19,092	18–15–2	38
36	January 18	Montreal	5–3	Dallas		Oettinger	17,679	18–16–2	38
37	January 20	Dallas	5–4	Buffalo		Holtby	7,808	19–16–2	40
38	January 21	Dallas	5–4	Detroit	OT	Holtby	18,522	20–16–2	42
39	January 24	Dallas	3–1	Philadelphia		Oettinger	14,868	21–16–2	44
40	January 25	Dallas	5–1	New Jersey		Holtby	10,382	22–16–2	46
41	January 28	Washington	5–0	Dallas		Holtby	18,532	22–17–2	46
42	January 30	Boston	1–6	Dallas		Oettinger	17,954	23–17–2	48

February: 6–3–1 (home: 4–2–0; road: 2–1–1)
#	Date	Visitor	Score	Home	OT	Decision	Attendance	Record	Pts	Recap
43	February 1	Calgary	4–3	Dallas		Oettinger	17,567	23–18–2	48
44	February 9	Nashville	3–4	Dallas		Oettinger	17,780	24–18–2	50
45	February 11	Winnipeg	3–4	Dallas	OT	Oettinger	18,014	25–18–2	52
46	February 13	Colorado	4–0	Dallas		Holtby	18,167	25–19–2	52
47	February 15	Dallas	4–1	Colorado		Oettinger	17,503	26–19–2	54
48	February 18	Dallas	1–0	Chicago	SO	Oettinger	19,845	27–19–2	56
49	February 20	Dallas	1–3	Arizona		Oettinger	10,248	27–20–2	56
50	February 23	Winnipeg	2–3	Dallas	OT	Oettinger	10,098	28–20–2	58
51	February 24	Dallas	1–2	Nashville	SO	Oettinger	17,869	28–20–3	59
52	February 27	Buffalo	2–4	Dallas		Oettinger	18,532	29–20–3	61

March: 9–5–0 (home: 2–2–0; road: 7–3–0)
#	Date	Visitor	Score	Home	OT	Decision	Attendance	Record	Pts	Recap
53	March 2	Los Angeles	3–4	Dallas		Oettinger	18,046	30–20–3	63
54	March 4	Dallas	4–3	Winnipeg	OT	Holtby	13,466	31–20–3	65
55	March 6	Dallas	6–3	Minnesota		Oettinger	18,791	32–20–3	67
56	March 8	Dallas	1–2	Nashville		Oettinger	17,306	32–21–3	67
57	March 12	NY Rangers	7–4	Dallas		Oettinger	18,532	32–22–3	67
58	March 15	Dallas	0–4	Toronto		Oettinger	18,543	32–23–3	67
59	March 17	Dallas	4–3	Montreal	OT	Oettinger	20,714	33–23–3	69
60	March 19	Dallas	2–4	NY Islanders		Oettinger	17,255	34–23–3	69
61	March 20	Dallas	3–2	Washington		Oettinger	18,573	34–24–3	71
62	March 22	Edmonton	3–5	Dallas		Oettinger	18,532	35–24–3	73
63	March 24	Dallas	4–3	Carolina	SO	Wedgewood	16,421	36–24–3	75
64	March 26	Vancouver	4–1	Dallas		Oettinger	18,532	36–25–3	75
65	March 29	Dallas	3–2	Anaheim		Oettinger	12,617	37–25–3	77
66	March 31	Dallas	3–2	Anaheim	OT	Oettinger	12,385	38–25–3	79

April: 8–5–3 (home: 6–1–3; road: 2–4–0)
#	Date	Visitor	Score	Home	OT	Decision	Attendance	Record	Pts	Recap
67	April 2	Dallas	5–4	San Jose		Wedgewood	14,021	39–25–3	81
68	April 3	Dallas	1–4	Seattle		Oettinger	17,151	39–26–3	81
69	April 5	NY Islanders	2–3	Dallas		Oettinger	17,876	40–26–3	83
70	April 7	Toronto	4–3	Dallas	OT	Wedgewood	18,012	40–26–4	84
71	April 9	New Jersey	3–1	Dallas		Oettinger	18,127	40–27–4	84
72	April 10	Dallas	6–4	Chicago		Oettinger	18,809	41–27–4	86
73	April 12	Tampa Bay	0–1	Dallas		Wedgewood	17,567	42–27–4	88
74	April 14	Minnesota	3–2	Dallas	OT	Wedgewood	18,110	42–27–5	89
75	April 16	San Jose	1–2	Dallas		Oettinger	18,532	43–27–5	91
76	April 18	Dallas	2–6	Vancouver		Oettinger	18,890	43–28–5	91
77	April 20	Dallas	2–5	Edmonton		Wedgewood	16,833	43–29–5	91
78	April 21	Dallas	2–4	Calgary		Oettinger	17,280	43–30–5	91
79	April 23	Seattle	2–3	Dallas		Oettinger	18,532	44–30–5	93
80	April 26	Vegas	2–3	Dallas	SO	Oettinger	18,532	45–30–5	95
81	April 27	Arizona	4–3	Dallas	OT	Wedgewood	18,025	45–30–6	96
82	April 29	Anaheim	2–4	Dallas		Oettinger	18,532	46–30–6	98

Legend: Win (2 points) Loss (0 points) Overtime/shootout loss (1 point)

=== Playoffs ===
2022 Stanley Cup playoffs

Western Conference First Round vs. (P1) Calgary Flames: Calgary won 4–3
#	Date	Visitor	Score	Home	OT	Decision	Attendance	Series	Recap
1	May 3	Dallas	0–1	Calgary		Oettinger	19,289	0–1
2	May 5	Dallas	2–0	Calgary		Oettinger	19,289	1–1
3	May 7	Calgary	2–4	Dallas		Oettinger	18,532	2–1
4	May 9	Calgary	4–1	Dallas		Oettinger	18,532	2–2
5	May 11	Dallas	1–3	Calgary		Oettinger	19,289	2–3
6	May 13	Calgary	2–4	Dallas		Oettinger	18,532	3–3
7	May 15	Dallas	2–3	Calgary	OT	Oettinger	19,289	3–4

Legend: Win Loss

== Player statistics ==
=== Skaters ===
Regular season
Player	GP	G	A	Pts	+/−	PIM
Joe Pavelski	82	27	54	81	+11	14
Jason Robertson	74	41	38	79	+16	22
Roope Hintz	80	37	35	72	+15	28
Tyler Seguin	81	24	25	49	−21	30
John Klingberg	74	6	41	47	−28	34
Jamie Benn	82	18	28	46	−13	88
Miro Heiskanen	70	5	31	36	+3	24
Ryan Suter	82	7	25	32	+1	40
Denis Gurianov	73	11	20	31	+2	16
Esa Lindell	76	4	21	25	+4	12
Alexander Radulov	71	4	18	22	−20	30
Radek Faksa	77	5	14	19	−20	52
Jacob Peterson	65	12	5	17	−1	12
Luke Glendening	82	9	7	16	−17	15
Michael Raffl	76	7	9	16	−19	16
Jani Hakanpaa	80	4	8	12	+1	43
Joel Kiviranta	56	1	6	7	−6	10
Joel Hanley	44	2	4	6	−13	4
Vladislav Namestnikov^{†}	15	3	2	5	+1	11
Andrej Sekera	32	1	3	4	−3	16
Thomas Harley	34	1	3	4	−4	6
Marian Studenic^{†}	16	1	2	3	−1	6
Tanner Kero	23	0	3	3	−5	0
Riley Damiani	7	1	1	2	0	2
Blake Comeau	6	1	0	1	−1	4
Riley Tufte	10	1	0	1	0	4
Fredrik Karlstrom	3	0	1	1	+2	0
Rhett Gardner	4	0	0	0	−1	0
Ty Dellandrea	1	0	0	0	−1	0

Playoffs
Player	GP	G	A	Pts	+/−	PIM
Joe Pavelski	7	3	3	6	+2	2
Roope Hintz	6	2	2	4	+3	2
Tyler Seguin	7	2	2	4	0	4
Jason Robertson	7	1	3	4	+3	0
Michael Raffl	7	2	1	3	−1	19
Miro Heiskanen	7	1	2	3	0	4
Ryan Suter	7	0	3	3	−1	2
Radek Faksa	7	1	1	2	+1	4
Vladislav Namestnikov	7	1	1	2	−3	16
Jamie Benn	7	1	1	2	+1	6
Esa Lindell	7	0	2	2	0	0
Jani Hakanpaa	7	0	2	2	+1	4
Joel Kiviranta	7	0	1	1	−2	4
John Klingberg	7	0	1	1	−2	26
Ty Dellandrea	1	0	0	0	+1	0
Marian Studenic	4	0	0	0	−3	2
Jacob Peterson	3	0	0	0	−2	0
Denis Gurianov	5	0	0	0	+1	0
Joel Hanley	7	0	0	0	+1	0
Luke Glendening	6	0	0	0	−2	2
Alexander Radulov	3	0	0	0	−1	0

=== Goaltenders ===
Regular season
Player	GP	GS	TOI	W	L	OT	GA	GAA	SA	SV%	SO	G	A	PIM
Jake Oettinger	48	46	2,707:36	30	15	1	114	2.53	1,331	.914	1	0	2	0
Braden Holtby	24	22	1,318:28	10	10	1	61	2.78	700	.913	0	0	0	2
Scott Wedgewood^{†}	8	7	452:16	3	1	3	23	3.05	265	.913	1	0	0	0
Anton Khudobin	9	7	462:28	3	4	1	28	3.63	231	.879	0	0	0	0

Playoffs
Player	GP	GS	TOI	W	L	GA	GAA	SA	SV%	SO	G	A	PIM
Jake Oettinger	7	7	429:49	3	4	13	1.81	285	.954	1	0	0	0

^{†}Denotes player spent time with another team before joining the Stars. Stats reflect time with the Stars only.
^{‡}Denotes player was traded mid-season. Stats reflect time with the Stars only.
Bold/italics denotes franchise record.

== Transactions ==
The Stars have been involved in the following transactions during the 2021–22 season.

=== Trades ===
Date	Details		Ref
July 17, 2021	To Vancouver Canucks Jason Dickinson	To Dallas Stars 3rd-round pick in 2021	
July 23, 2021	To Detroit Red Wings 1st-round pick in 2021	To Dallas Stars WSH 1st-round pick in 2021; NYR 2nd-round pick in 2021; OTT 5th-round pick in 2021	
February 1, 2022	To Tampa Bay Lightning Tye Felhaber	To Dallas Stars Alexei Lipanov	
March 20, 2022	To Arizona Coyotes Conditional^{1} 4th-round pick in 2023	To Dallas Stars Scott Wedgewood	
March 21, 2022	To Detroit Red Wings 4th-round pick in 2024	To Dallas Stars Vladislav Namestnikov	
June 10, 2022	To Buffalo Sabres Ben Bishop; 7th-round pick in 2022	To Dallas Stars Future considerations	

Notes:

1. Arizona will receive a 3rd-round pick in 2023 if Dallas qualifies for the 2022 Stanley Cup playoffs.

=== Players acquired ===
Date	Player	Former team	Term	Via	Ref
July 28, 2021	Andreas Borgman	Tampa Bay Lightning	1-year	Free agency	
July 28, 2021	Luke Glendening	Detroit Red Wings	2-year	Free agency	
July 28, 2021	Braden Holtby	Vancouver Canucks	1-year	Free agency	
July 28, 2021	Alex Petrovic	Calgary Flames	1-year	Free agency	
July 28, 2021	Ryan Suter	Minnesota Wild	4-year	Free agency	
July 29, 2021	Jani Hakanpaa	Carolina Hurricanes	3-year	Free agency	
July 29, 2021	Michael Raffl	Washington Capitals	1-year	Free agency	
August 2, 2021	Jerad Rosburg	Texas Stars (AHL)	2-year	Free agency	
August 2, 2021	Marian Studenic	New Jersey Devils		Waivers	
May 18, 2022	Fredrik Olofsson	IK Oskarshamn (SHL)	1-year	Free agency	
June 6, 2022	Matej Blumel	HC Dynamo Pardubice (ELH)	2-year	Free agency	

=== Players lost ===
Date	Player	New team	Term	Via	Ref
July 15, 2021	Landon Bow	Rytiri Kladno (ELH)	Unknown	Free agency	
July 21, 2021	Jamie Oleksiak	Seattle Kraken		Expansion draft	
July 28, 2021	Andrew Cogliano	San Jose Sharks	1-year	Free agency	
July 28, 2021	Justin Dowling	Vancouver Canucks	2-year	Free agency	
July 28, 2021	Taylor Fedun	Pittsburgh Penguins	1-year	Free agency	
July 28, 2021	Mark Pysyk	Buffalo Sabres	1-year	Free agency	
August 2, 2021	Adam Mascherin	Skelleftea AIK (SHL)	1-year	Free agency	
December 14, 2021	Ben Bishop			Retirement	
December 16, 2021	Andreas Borgman			Contract termination	
December 17, 2021	Andreas Borgman	Frolunda HC (SHL)	5-year	Free agency	

=== Signings ===
Date	Player	Term	Contract type	Ref
July 17, 2021	Miro Heiskanen	8-year	Re-signing	
July 30, 2021	Nick Caamano	1-year	Re-signing	
July 30, 2021	Colton Point	1-year	Re-signing	
July 31, 2021	Ben Gleason	1-year	Re-signing	
July 31, 2021	Joel Kiviranta	2-year	Re-signing	
August 3, 2021	Joseph Cecconi	1-year	Re-signing	
September 28, 2021	Wyatt Johnston	3-year	Entry-level	
September 28, 2021	Logan Stankoven	3-year	Entry-level	
October 5, 2021	Artem Grushnikov	3-year	Entry-level	
March 1, 2022	Antonio Stranges	3-year	Entry-level	
March 10, 2022	Remi Poirier	3-year	Entry-level	
March 11, 2022	Joe Pavelski	1-year	Extension	
June 7, 2022	Denis Gurianov	1-year	Extension	
June 7, 2022	Alex Petrovic	1-year	Extension	
June 13, 2022	Nick Caamano	1-year	Extension	
June 14, 2022	Fredrik Karlstrom	1-year	Extension	
June 28, 2022	Joseph Cecconi	1-year	Extension	
June 29, 2022	Ryan Shea	1-year	Extension	
June 30, 2022	Riley Tufte	1-year	Extension	
June 30, 2022	Scott Wedgewood	2-year	Extension	

== Draft picks ==
Below are the Dallas Stars' selections at the 2021 NHL entry draft, which were held on July 23 to 24, 2021. It was held virtually via Video conference call from the NHL Network studio in Secaucus, New Jersey.

Round	#	Player	Pos.	Nationality	Team (League)
1	23	Wyatt Johnston	C	Canada	Windsor Spitfires (OHL)
2	47	Logan Stankoven	C	Canada	Kamloops Blazers (WHL)
2	48	Artem Grushnikov	D	Russia	Hamilton Bulldogs (OHL)
3	73	Ayrton Martino	LW	Canada	Omaha Lancers (USHL)
3	79	Justin Ertel	LW	Canada	Summerside Western Capitals (MHL)
4	111	Conner Roulette	LW	Canada	Seattle Thunderbirds (WHL)
5	138	Jack Bar	D	Canada	Chicago Steel (USHL)
6	175	Francesco Arcuri	C	Canada	Steel Wings Linz (AlpsHL)
7	207	Albert Sjoberg	RW	Sweden	Sodertalje SK (J20 SuperElit)
