= 2021–22 Arizona Coyotes season =

National Hockey League season

2021–22 Arizona Coyotes
- Division: 8th Central
- Conference: 16th Western
- 2021–22 record: 25–50–7
- Home record: 11–27–3
- Road record: 14–23–4
- Goals for: 207
- Goals against: 313

Team information
- General manager: Bill Armstrong
- Coach: Andre Tourigny
- Captain: Vacant
- Alternate captains: Jay Beagle; Jakob Chychrun; Phil Kessel; Andrew Ladd
- Arena: Gila River Arena
- Average attendance: 11,601
- Minor league affiliates: Tucson Roadrunners (AHL); Rapid City Rush (ECHL)

Team leaders
- Goals: Clayton Keller (28)
- Assists: Phil Kessel (44)
- Points: Clayton Keller (63)
- Penalty minutes: Liam O'Brien (106)
- Plus/minus: Clayton Keller (+3)
- Wins: Karel Vejmelka (13)
- Goals against average: Josef Korenar (2.56)

The 2021–22 Arizona Coyotes season was the 43rd season for the National Hockey League (NHL) franchise that was established on June 22, 1979, the 26th season since the franchise relocated from Winnipeg following the 1995–96 NHL season, and the 50th overall season, including the World Hockey Association years.

The Coyotes returned to the Central Division for the 2021–22 season. The franchise was previously part of this division from the time of its formation in 1993 (when the team was still based in Manitoba) through to the end of its second season in Arizona in 1998. The modern Winnipeg Jets are also in the Central, thus for the first time that citys original NHL franchise will be in the same division as its current team. The leagues new expansion team the Seattle Kraken took the Coyotes' place in the Pacific Division.

This was the Coyotes' final season at Gila River Arena, as the city of Glendale decided not to renew the teams operating agreement with the city. Following this seasons conclusion, the Coyotes would reach a temporary agreement with Arizona State University in Tempe, Arizona, where the franchise would agree to play at the newly constructed Mullett Arena until they agreed to find a more permanent new home for themselves going forward. The Coyotes finished with 57 points, the worst record in the whole Western Conference.

They were eliminated from playoff contention following a 6–1 loss to the Edmonton Oilers on March 28, 2022. The Coyotes closed Gila River Arena by beating the Predators, 5–4, after trailing 4–0, in the season finale. Coincidentally, the Predators beat the then-Phoenix Coyotes, 3–1, in their first home game at Gila River Arena on December 27, 2003. It was known as Glendale Arena at the time.

== Standings ==
=== Divisional standings ===
Central Division
Pos	Team	GP	W	L	OTL	RW	GF	GA	GD	Pts
1	z – Colorado Avalanche	82	56	19	7	46	312	234	+78	119
2	x – Minnesota Wild	82	53	22	7	37	310	253	+57	113
3	x – St. Louis Blues	82	49	22	11	43	311	242	+69	109
4	x – Dallas Stars	82	46	30	6	31	238	246	−8	98
5	x – Nashville Predators	82	45	30	7	35	266	252	+14	97
6	Winnipeg Jets	82	39	32	11	31	252	257	−5	89
7	Chicago Blackhawks	82	28	42	12	16	219	291	−72	68
8	Arizona Coyotes	82	25	50	7	18	207	313	−106	57

Source: National Hockey League
Rules for classification: 1) Fewer number of games played (GP, only during regular season); 2) Greater number of regulation wins (RW); 3) Greater number of wins in regulation and overtime, excluding shootout wins (ROW); 4) Greater number of total wins, including shootouts (W); 5) Greater number of points earned in head-to-head play; if teams played an uneven number of head-to-head games, the result of the first game on the home ice of the team with the extra home game is discarded; 6) Greater goal differential (GD); 7) Greater number of goals scored (GF)
x – Clinched playoff spot; z – Clinched conference

=== Conference standings ===
Western Conference Wild Card
Pos	Div	Team	GP	W	L	OTL	RW	GF	GA	GD	Pts
1	CE	x – Dallas Stars	82	46	30	6	31	238	246	−8	98
2	CE	x – Nashville Predators	82	45	30	7	35	266	252	+14	97
3	PA	Vegas Golden Knights	82	43	31	8	34	266	248	+18	94
4	PA	Vancouver Canucks	82	40	30	12	32	249	236	+13	92
5	CE	Winnipeg Jets	82	39	32	11	32	252	257	−5	89
6	PA	San Jose Sharks	82	32	37	13	22	214	264	−50	77
7	PA	Anaheim Ducks	82	31	37	14	22	232	271	−39	76
8	CE	Chicago Blackhawks	82	28	42	12	16	219	291	−72	68
9	PA	Seattle Kraken	82	27	49	6	23	216	285	−69	60
10	CE	Arizona Coyotes	82	25	50	7	18	207	313	−106	57

Source: National Hockey League
Rules for classification: 1) Fewer number of games played (GP, only during regular season); 2) Greater number of regulation wins (RW); 3) Greater number of wins in regulation and overtime, excluding shootout wins (ROW); 4) Greater number of total wins, including shootouts (W); 5) Greater number of points earned in head-to-head play; if teams played an uneven number of head-to-head games, the result of the first game on the home ice of the team with the extra home game is discarded; 6) Greater goal differential (GD); 7) Greater number of goals scored (GF)
x – Clinched playoff spot

== Schedule and results ==
=== Preseason ===
The team's preseason schedule was released on August 9, 2021.

2021 preseason game log: 5–1–0 (home: 2–0–0; road: 3–1–0)
#	Date	Visitor	Score	Home	OT	Decision	Attendance	Record	Recap
1	September 27	Los Angeles	1–2	Arizona		Thornton	7,532	1–0–0
2	September 29	Arizona	4–1	Anaheim		Prosvetov	—	2–0–0
3	October 2	Anaheim	3–4	Arizona		Vejmelka	8,990	3–0–0
4	October 3	Arizona	3–6	Dallas		Korenar	—	3–1–0
5	October 5	Arizona	4–1	Los Angeles		Hutton	—	4–1–0
6	October 7	Arizona	3–1	Vegas		Vejmelka	16,883	5–1–0

=== Regular season ===
The team's regular season schedule was published on July 22, 2021, with only about a handful of games scheduled in February because NHL players are planning to participate in the 2022 Winter Olympics.

2021–22 game log

October: 0–8–1 (home: 0–3–0; road: 0–5–1)
#	Date	Visitor	Score	Home	OT	Decision	Attendance	Record	Pts	Recap
1	October 14	Arizona	2–8	Columbus		Hutton	17,813	0–1–0	0
2	October 16	Arizona	1–2	Buffalo	SO	Vejmelka	7,872	0–1–1	1
3	October 18	St. Louis	7–4	Arizona		Hutton	15,235	0–2–1	1
4	October 21	Edmonton	5–1	Arizona		Vejmelka	9,748	0–3–1	1
5	October 23	NY Islanders	3–0	Arizona		Vejmelka	11,690	0–4–1	1
6	October 25	Arizona	3–5	Florida		Vejmelka	13,943	0–5–1	1
7	October 28	Arizona	1–5	Tampa Bay		Prosvetov	19,092	0–6–1	1
8	October 29	Arizona	0–2	Washington		Vejmelka	18,573	0–7–1	1
9	October 31	Arizona	1–2	Carolina		Vejmelka	14,343	0–8–1	1

November: 5–8–1 (home: 2–3–1; road: 3–5–0)
#	Date	Visitor	Score	Home	OT	Decision	Attendance	Record	Pts	Recap
10	November 2	Arizona	0–3	Philadelphia		Vejmelka	16,057	0–9–1	1
11	November 5	Arizona	1–3	Anaheim		Vejmelka	12,148	0–10–1	1
12	November 6	Seattle	4–5	Arizona		Wedgewood	15,045	1–10–1	3
13	November 10	Minnesota	5–2	Arizona		Vejmelka	13,488	1–11–1	3
14	November 12	Arizona	1–2	Chicago		Wedgewood	17,828	1–12–1	3
15	November 13	Arizona	1–4	Nashville		Vejmelka	17,159	1–13–1	3
16	November 16	Arizona	3–2	St. Louis		Wedgewood	16,738	2–13–1	5
17	November 18	Columbus	5–4	Arizona	SO	Wedgewood	7,865	2–13–2	6
18	November 20	Detroit	1–2	Arizona	OT	Wedgewood	12,906	3–13–2	8
19	November 21	Arizona	2–1	Los Angeles	OT	Vejmelka	13,474	4–13–2	10
20	November 24	Edmonton	5–3	Arizona		Wedgewood	12,845	4–14–2	10
21	November 27	Dallas	3–2	Arizona		Wedgewood	10,839	4–15–2	10
22	November 29	Arizona	1–0	Winnipeg		Vejmelka	14,129	5–15–2	12
23	November 30	Arizona	2–5	Minnesota		Wedgewood	16,239	5–16–2	12

December: 1–5–1 (home: 0–4–0; road: 1–1–1)
#	Date	Visitor	Score	Home	OT	Decision	Attendance	Record	Pts	Recap
24	December 3	Vegas	7–1	Arizona		Vejmelka	12,389	5–17–2	12
25	December 6	Arizona	1–4	Dallas		Wedgewood	17,256	5–18–2	12
26	December 10	Florida	3–1	Arizona		Wedgewood	11,974	5–19–2	12
27	December 11	Philadelphia	5–3	Arizona		Vejmelka	10,562	5–20–2	12
28	December 15	NY Rangers	3–2	Arizona		Wedgewood	11,380	5–21–2	12
29	December 17	Arizona	6–5	Anaheim	OT	Wedgewood	14,135	6–21–2	14
—	December 19	Arizona		Vancouver	Postponed due to COVID-19. Moved to February 8.
—	December 21	Arizona		Seattle	Postponed due to COVID-19. Moved to February 9.
—	December 23	Tampa Bay		Arizona	Postponed due to COVID-19. Moved to February 11.
—	December 27	Los Angeles		Arizona	Postponed due to COVID-19. Moved to February 19.
30	December 28	Arizona	7–8	San Jose	SO	Wedgewood	11,450	6–21–3	15

January: 4–8–1 (home: 3–5–0; road: 1–3–1)
#	Date	Visitor	Score	Home	OT	Decision	Attendance	Record	Pts	Recap
—	January 2	Dallas		Arizona	Postponed due to COVID-19. Moved to February 20.
31	January 4	Winnipeg	3–1	Arizona		Vejmelka	8,173	6–22–3	15
32	January 6	Chicago	4–6	Arizona		Vejmelka	11,632	7–22–3	17
33	January 8	Nashville	4–2	Arizona		Vejmelka	10,317	7–23–3	17
34	January 12	Toronto	1–2	Arizona		Vejmelka	10,031	8–23–3	19
35	January 14	Arizona	3–4	Colorado	SO	Prosvetov	17,072	8–23–4	20
36	January 15	Colorado	5–0	Arizona		Vejmelka	14,313	8–24–4	20
37	January 17	Montreal	2–5	Arizona		Vejmelka	9,495	9–24–4	22
38	January 19	Arizona	4–1	New Jersey		Vejmelka	10,592	10–24–4	24
39	January 21	Arizona	0–4	NY Islanders		Wedgewood	17,255	10–25–4	24
40	January 22	Arizona	3–7	NY Rangers		Vejmelka	17,006	10–26–4	24
41	January 25	Arizona	3–6	Pittsburgh		Vejmelka	16,360	10–27–4	24
42	January 28	Boston	2–1	Arizona		Wedgewood	12,994	10–28–4	24
43	January 29	Buffalo	3–1	Arizona		Vejmelka	12,853	10–29–4	24

February: 4–6–0 (home: 2–5–0; road: 2–1–0)
#	Date	Visitor	Score	Home	OT	Decision	Attendance	Record	Pts	Recap
44	February 1	Arizona	3–2	Colorado	SO	Wedgewood	15,345	11–29–4	26
45	February 2	Calgary	4–2	Arizona		Vejmelka	9,552	11–30–4	26
46	February 8	Arizona	1–5	Vancouver		Vejmelka	9,124	11–31–4	26
47	February 9	Arizona	5–2	Seattle		Vejmelka	17,151	12–31–4	28
48	February 11	Tampa Bay	4–3	Arizona		Vejmelka	11,727	12–32–4	28
49	February 19	Los Angeles	5–3	Arizona		Vejmelka	13,831	12–33–4	28
50	February 20	Dallas	1–3	Arizona		Wedgewood	10,248	13–33–4	30
51	February 23	Los Angeles	3–2	Arizona		Wedgewood	9,415	13–34–4	30
52	February 25	Vegas	1–3	Arizona		Wedgewood	11,934	14–34–4	32
53	February 27	Winnipeg	5–3	Arizona		Wedgewood	10,152	14–35–4	32

March: 7–6–1 (home: 3–2–0; road: 4–4–1)
#	Date	Visitor	Score	Home	OT	Decision	Attendance	Record	Pts	Recap
54	March 3	Colorado	1–2	Arizona		Vejmelka	10,840	15–35–4	34
55	March 5	Ottawa	5–8	Arizona		Wedgewood	11,810	16–35–4	36
56	March 8	Arizona	9–2	Detroit		Vejmelka	14,621	17–35–4	38
57	March 10	Arizona	5–4	Toronto	OT	Wedgewood	17,351	18–35–4	40
58	March 12	Arizona	2–3	Boston		Vejmelka	17,850	18–36–4	40
59	March 14	Arizona	5–3	Ottawa		Wedgewood	9,201	19–36–4	42
60	March 15	Arizona	6–3	Montreal		Vejmelka	20,532	20–36–4	44
61	March 19	Pittsburgh	4–1	Arizona		Wedgewood	14,507	20–37–4	44
62	March 20	Arizona	2–4	San Jose		Vejmelka	13,349	20–38–4	44
63	March 22	Seattle	4–2	Arizona		Vejmelka	11,670	20–39–4	44
64	March 25	Arizona	2–4	Calgary		Vejmelka	16,526	20–40–4	44
65	March 27	Arizona	1–2	Winnipeg	OT	Vejmelka	13,825	20–40–5	45
66	March 28	Arizona	1–6	Edmonton		Vejmelka	15,237	20–41–5	45
67	March 30	San Jose	2–5	Arizona		Vejmelka	9,949	21–41–5	47

April: 4–9–2 (home: 1–5–2; road: 3–4–0)
#	Date	Visitor	Score	Home	OT	Decision	Attendance	Record	Pts	Recap
68	April 1	Anaheim	5–0	Arizona		Vejmelka	13,587	21–42–5	47
69	April 3	Arizona	3–2	Chicago	OT	Vejmelka	19,869	22–42–5	49
70	April 4	Arizona	1–5	St. Louis		Prosvetov	17,163	22–43–5	49
71	April 7	Vancouver	5–1	Arizona		Sateri	9,679	22–44–5	49
72	April 9	Arizona	1–6	Vegas		Vejmelka	18,123	22–45–5	49
73	April 12	New Jersey	6–2	Arizona		Vejmelka	8,679	22–46–5	49
74	April 14	Arizona	1–7	Vancouver		Vejmelka	18,890	22–47–5	49
75	April 16	Arizona	1–9	Calgary		Sateri	16,823	22–48–5	49
76	April 18	Carolina	5–3	Arizona		Vejmelka	8,496	22–49–5	49
77	April 20	Chicago	4–3	Arizona	OT	Vejmelka	11,916	22–49–6	50
78	April 22	Washington	2–0	Arizona		Vejmelka	14,053	22–50–6	50
79	April 23	St. Louis	5–4	Arizona	OT	Sateri	12,717	22–50–7	51
80	April 26	Arizona	5–3	Minnesota		Vejmelka	18,383	23–50–7	53
81	April 27	Arizona	4–3	Dallas	OT	Sateri	18,025	24–50–7	55
82	April 29	Nashville	4–5	Arizona		Sateri	15,123	25–50–7	57

Legend: Win (2 points) Loss (0 points) Overtime/shootout loss (1 point)

== Player statistics ==
=== Skaters ===
Regular season
Player	GP	G	A	Pts	+/−	PIM
Clayton Keller	67	28	35	63	+3	28
Nick Schmaltz	63	23	36	59	+1	14
Phil Kessel	82	8	44	52	−24	40
Shayne Gostisbehere	82	14	37	51	−23	26
Travis Boyd	74	17	18	35	−10	34
Lawson Crouse	65	20	14	34	−9	52
Barrett Hayton	60	10	14	24	−8	20
Anton Stralman	74	8	15	23	−16	12
Jakob Chychrun	47	7	14	21	−20	47
Alex Galchenyuk	60	6	15	21	−11	32
Loui Eriksson	73	3	16	19	−18	6
Johan Larsson^{‡}	29	6	9	15	−3	30
Janis Moser	43	4	11	15	−10	16
Nick Ritchie^{†}	24	10	4	14	−7	20
Andrew Ladd	51	7	5	12	−20	47
Dysin Mayo	67	4	8	12	−22	27
Christian Fischer	53	5	5	10	−15	14
Kyle Capobianco	45	2	7	9	−12	38
Ilya Lyubushkin^{‡}	46	0	9	9	−6	26
Antoine Roussel	53	4	4	8	−16	59
Ryan Dzingel^{‡}	26	4	3	7	−3	35
Cam Dineen	34	0	7	7	−16	4
Michael Carcone	21	4	2	6	−8	14
Matias Maccelli	23	1	5	6	−10	4
Nathan Smith	10	2	2	4	−1	2
Riley Nash^{†‡}	24	0	4	4	−3	4
Liam O'Brien	39	2	1	3	+1	106
Jack McBain	10	2	1	3	−6	6
Jan Jenik	13	2	1	3	−6	11
Vladislav Kolyachonok	32	1	2	3	0	6
Jay Beagle	33	1	1	2	−20	27
Bokondji Imama	4	1	0	1	−2	5
Dmitrij Jaskin	12	0	1	1	−6	4
Hudson Fasching	11	0	0	0	−3	0
Blake Speers	2	0	0	0	−2	2
Conor Timmins	6	0	0	0	−6	0
Victor Soderstrom	16	0	0	0	−7	6
Ben McCartney	2	0	0	0	0	4

=== Goaltenders ===
Regular season
Player	GP	GS	TOI	W	L	OT	GA	GAA	SA	SV%	SO	G	A	PIM
Karel Vejmelka	52	49	2,773:14	13	32	3	170	3.68	1,669	.898	1	0	0	0
Scott Wedgewood^{†‡}	26	23	1,481:26	10	12	2	78	3.16	878	.911	0	0	0	0
Harri Sateri	6	4	298:22	2	2	1	21	4.22	157	.866	0	0	0	0
Josef Korenar	2	0	70:18	0	0	0	3	2.56	35	.914	0	0	0	0
Ivan Prosvetov	3	3	185:00	0	2	1	13	4.22	104	.875	0	0	0	0
Carter Hutton^{‡}	3	3	115:58	0	2	0	15	7.76	58	.741	0	0	0	0

^{†}Denotes player spent time with another team before joining the Coyotes. Stats reflect time with the Coyotes only.
^{‡}Denotes player was traded mid-season. Stats reflect time with the Coyotes only.
Bold/italics denotes franchise record.

== Transactions ==
The Coyotes have been involved in the following transactions during the 2021–22 season.

=== Trades ===
Date	Details		Ref
July 17, 2021	To San Jose Sharks Adin Hill; 7th-round pick in 2022	To Arizona Coyotes Josef Korenar; 2nd-round pick in 2022	
July 17, 2021	To New York Islanders Future considerations	To Arizona Coyotes Andrew Ladd; COL 2nd-round pick in 2021; Conditional^{1} 2nd-round pick in 2022; Conditional^{2} 3rd-round pick in 2023	
July 22, 2021	To Philadelphia Flyers Future considerations	To Arizona Coyotes Shayne Gostisbehere; 2nd-round pick in 2022; STL 7th-round pick in 2022	
July 23, 2021	To Vancouver Canucks Oliver Ekman-Larsson^{[c]} Conor Garland	To Arizona Coyotes Loui Eriksson; Antoine Roussel; Jay Beagle; 1st-round pick in 2021; 2nd-round pick in 2022; 7th-round pick in 2023	
July 24, 2021	To Los Angeles Kings Brayden Burke; Tyler Steenbergen	To Arizona Coyotes Cole Hults; Bokondji Imama	
July 26, 2021	To Florida Panthers 7th-round pick in 2023	To Arizona Coyotes Anton Stralman; Vladislav Kolyachonok; 2nd-round pick in 2024	
July 28, 2021	To San Jose Sharks Lane Pederson	To Arizona Coyotes 4th-round pick in 2024	
February 19, 2022	To Toronto Maple Leafs Ryan Dzingel; Ilya Lyubushkin	To Arizona Coyotes Nick Ritchie; Conditional 2nd-round pick in 2025 or 3rd-round pick in 2023	
February 21, 2022	To Toronto Maple Leafs Carter Hutton	To Arizona Coyotes Future considerations	
February 22, 2022	To Boston Bruins Michael Callahan	To Arizona Coyotes 7th-round pick in 2024	
March 20, 2022	To Dallas Stars Scott Wedgewood	To Arizona Coyotes Conditional^{3} 4th-round pick in 2023	
March 21, 2022	To Minnesota Wild VAN 2nd-round pick in 2022	To Arizona Coyotes Jack McBain	
March 21, 2022	To Tampa Bay Lightning Riley Nash	To Arizona Coyotes Future considerations	
March 21, 2022	To Washington Capitals Johan Larsson	To Arizona Coyotes 3rd-round pick in 2023	
March 21, 2022	To Winnipeg Jets 4th-round pick in 2022	To Arizona Coyotes Bryan Little; Nathan Smith	

Notes:

1. Arizona will receive the earliest of either the Colorado Avalanche's or the New York Islanders' second-round pick in 2022.
2. Arizona will receive a third-round pick in 2023 if Ladd does not play in any professional games in 2022–23 under his current contract and does not retire prior to the conclusion of the 2022–23 regular season; otherwise no pick will be exchanged.
3. Arizona will receive a 3rd-round pick in 2023 if the Dallas Stars qualify for the 2022 Stanley Cup playoffs.

=== Players acquired ===
Date	Player	Former team	Term	Via	Ref
July 28, 2021	Ryan Dzingel	Carolina Hurricanes	1-year	Free agency	
July 28, 2021	Carter Hutton	Buffalo Sabres	1-year	Free agency	
July 28, 2021	Dmitrij Jaskin	Dynamo Moscow (KHL)	1-year	Free agency	
July 28, 2021	Liam O'Brien	Colorado Avalanche	1-year	Free agency	
July 29, 2021	Michael Carcone	Nashville Predators	2-year	Free agency	
August 3, 2021	Travis Boyd	Vancouver Canucks	1-year	Free agency	
October 6, 2021	Alex Galchenyuk	Toronto Maple Leafs	1-year	Free agency	
October 13, 2021	Anson Thornton	Sarnia Sting (OHL)	3-year	Free agency	
November 4, 2021	Scott Wedgewood	New Jersey Devils		Waivers	
January 6, 2022	Riley Nash	Tampa Bay Lightning		Waivers	
March 21, 2022	Harri Sateri	Toronto Maple Leafs		Waivers	
June 1, 2022	Ronald Knot	Neftekhimik Nizhnekamsk (KHL)	1-year	Free agency	

=== Players lost ===
Date	Player	New team	Term	Via	Ref
July 21, 2021	Tyler Pitlick	Seattle Kraken		Expansion draft	
July 28, 2021	Michael Bunting	Toronto Maple Leafs	2-year	Free agency	
July 28, 2021	Alex Goligoski	Minnesota Wild	1-year	Free agency	
July 28, 2021	John Hayden	Buffalo Sabres	1-year	Free agency	
July 28, 2021	Dryden Hunt	New York Rangers	2-year	Free agency	
July 28, 2021	Jordan Oesterle	Detroit Red Wings	2-year	Free agency	
July 28, 2021	Antti Raanta	Carolina Hurricanes	2-year	Free agency	
July 29, 2021	Michael Chaput	Pittsburgh Penguins	1-year	Free agency	
August 25, 2021	Derick Brassard	Philadelphia Flyers	1-year	Free agency	
September 9, 2021	Nate Sucese	Iowa Wild (AHL)	1-year	Free agency	
September 29, 2021	Aaron Ness	Providence Bruins (AHL)	1-year	Free agency	
October 8, 2021	Frederik Gauthier	New Jersey Devils	1-year	Free agency	
December 19, 2021	Vladislav Provolnev			Contract termination	
December 21, 2021	Vladislav Provolnev	CSKA Moscow (KHL)	3-year	Free agency	
June 7, 2021	Josef Korenar	HC Sparta Praha (ELH)	2-year	Free agency	

=== Signings ===
Date	Player	Term	Contract type	Ref
July 28, 2021	Liam Kirk	3-year	Entry-level	
July 29, 2021	Hudson Fasching	1-year	Re-signing	
August 2, 2021	Cam Dineen	1-year	Re-signing	
August 2, 2021	Dysin Mayo	1-year	Re-signing	
August 2, 2021	Blake Speers	1-year	Re-signing	
August 6, 2021	Bokondji Imama	1-year	Re-signing	
August 6, 2021	Conor Timmins	2-year	Re-signing	
August 14, 2021	Janis Moser	3-year	Entry-level	
August 30, 2021	Dylan Guenther	3-year	Entry-level	
February 25, 2022	Dysin Mayo	3-year	Extension	
March 5, 2022	Travis Boyd	2-year	Extension	
March 6, 2022	Liam O'Brien	2-year	Extension	
March 21, 2022	Jack McBain	2-year	Entry-level	
March 21, 2022	Karel Vejmelka	3-year	Extension	
April 11, 2022	Nathan Smith	2-year	Entry-level	
May 24, 2022	Ivan Prosvetov	1-year	Extension	

== Draft picks ==
Below are the Arizona Coyotes selections at the 2021 NHL entry draft, which will be held on July 23 and 24, 2021, virtually via video conference call from the NHL Network studio in Secaucus, New Jersey, due to the COVID-19 pandemic.

Round	#	Player	Pos	Nationality	College/Junior/Club team (League)
1	9	Dylan Guenther	RW	Canada	Edmonton Oil Kings (WHL)
1	11	Forfeited pick^{1}			
2	37	Josh Doan	RW	USA	Chicago Steel (USHL)
2	43	Ilya Fedotov	LW	Russia	Torpedo Nizhny Novgorod (KHL)
2	60	Janis Moser	D	Switzerland	EHC Biel (NL)
4	107	Emil Martinsen Lilleberg	D	Norway	Sparta Warriors (Eliteserien)
4	122	Rasmus Korhonen	G	Finland	Ässät (U20 SM-sarja)
5	139	Manix Landry	C	Canada	Gatineau Olympiques (QMJHL)
6	171	Cal Thomas	D	USA	Maple Grove Crimson (USHS-MN)

Notes

1. The Arizona Coyotes' first-round pick will be forfeited as the result of a penalty sanction due to violations of the NHL Combine Testing Policy during the 2019–20 NHL season. The penalty includes the forfeiture of a second-round pick in 2020 and this pick.
