= 2021–22 Anaheim Ducks season =

Anaheim Ducks season

2021–22 Anaheim Ducks
- Division: 7th Pacific
- Conference: 13th Western
- 2021–22 record: 31–37–14
- Home record: 17–19–5
- Road record: 14–18–9
- Goals for: 232
- Goals against: 271

Team information
- General manager: Bob Murray (Oct. 13 – Nov. 10); Jeff Solomon (interim, Nov. 10 – Feb. 3); Pat Verbeek (Feb. 3 – Apr. 29)
- Coach: Dallas Eakins
- Captain: Ryan Getzlaf
- Alternate captains: Josh Manson (Oct. 13 – Mar. 14); Jakob Silfverberg; Rotating (Mar. 14 – Apr. 29)
- Arena: Honda Center
- Average attendance: 13,083
- Minor league affiliates: San Diego Gulls (AHL); Tulsa Oilers (ECHL)

Team leaders
- Goals: Troy Terry (37)
- Assists: Trevor Zegras (38)
- Points: Troy Terry (67)
- Penalty minutes: Nicolas Deslauriers (90)
- Plus/minus: Mason McTavish (+3)
- Wins: John Gibson (18)
- Goals against average: Anthony Stolarz (2.67)

The 2021–22 Anaheim Ducks season was the 29th season for the National Hockey League (NHL) franchise that was established on June 15, 1993.

On November 9, 2021, former general manager Bob Murray was placed on administrative leave by the Ducks pending the results of an ongoing investigation. The investigation is reportedly focused on Murray's alleged history of verbal abuse to players and staff members. Assistant general manager Jeff Solomon was initially named as acting general manager but was then named interim general manager when Murray resigned on November 10. Pat Verbeek was named general manager on February 3, 2022. The Ducks were eliminated from playoff contention on April 10, 2022, after a 5–2 loss to the Carolina Hurricanes.

== Standings ==
=== Divisional standings ===
Pacific Division
Pos	Team	GP	W	L	OTL	RW	GF	GA	GD	Pts
1	y – Calgary Flames	82	50	21	11	44	293	208	+85	111
2	x – Edmonton Oilers	82	49	27	6	38	290	252	+38	104
3	x – Los Angeles Kings	82	44	27	11	35	239	236	+3	99
4	Vegas Golden Knights	82	43	31	8	34	266	248	+18	94
5	Vancouver Canucks	82	40	30	12	32	249	236	+13	92
6	San Jose Sharks	82	32	37	13	22	214	264	−50	77
7	Anaheim Ducks	82	31	37	14	22	232	271	−39	76
8	Seattle Kraken	82	27	49	6	23	216	285	−69	60

Source: National Hockey League
Rules for classification: 1) Fewer number of games played (GP, only during regular season); 2) Greater number of regulation wins (RW); 3) Greater number of wins in regulation and overtime, excluding shootout wins (ROW); 4) Greater number of total wins, including shootouts (W); 5) Greater number of points earned in head-to-head play; if teams played an uneven number of head-to-head games, the result of the first game on the home ice of the team with the extra home game is discarded; 6) Greater goal differential (GD); 7) Greater number of goals scored (GF)
x – Clinched playoff spot; y – Clinched division

=== Conference standings ===
Western Conference Wild Card
Pos	Div	Team	GP	W	L	OTL	RW	GF	GA	GD	Pts
1	CE	x – Dallas Stars	82	46	30	6	31	238	246	−8	98
2	CE	x – Nashville Predators	82	45	30	7	35	266	252	+14	97
3	PA	Vegas Golden Knights	82	43	31	8	34	266	248	+18	94
4	PA	Vancouver Canucks	82	40	30	12	32	249	236	+13	92
5	CE	Winnipeg Jets	82	39	32	11	32	252	257	−5	89
6	PA	San Jose Sharks	82	32	37	13	22	214	264	−50	77
7	PA	Anaheim Ducks	82	31	37	14	22	232	271	−39	76
8	CE	Chicago Blackhawks	82	28	42	12	16	219	291	−72	68
9	PA	Seattle Kraken	82	27	49	6	23	216	285	−69	60
10	CE	Arizona Coyotes	82	25	50	7	18	207	313	−106	57

Source: National Hockey League
Rules for classification: 1) Fewer number of games played (GP, only during regular season); 2) Greater number of regulation wins (RW); 3) Greater number of wins in regulation and overtime, excluding shootout wins (ROW); 4) Greater number of total wins, including shootouts (W); 5) Greater number of points earned in head-to-head play; if teams played an uneven number of head-to-head games, the result of the first game on the home ice of the team with the extra home game is discarded; 6) Greater goal differential (GD); 7) Greater number of goals scored (GF)
x – Clinched playoff spot

== Schedule and results ==
=== Preseason ===
The preseason schedule was published on July 29, 2021.

2021 preseason game log: 3–4–0 (home: 1–2–0; road: 2–2–0)
#	Date	Opponent	Score	OT	Decision	Location	Attendance	Record	Recap
1	September 26	San Jose	6–3		Eriksson Ek	Honda Center	—	1–0–0
2	September 29	Arizona	1–4		Dostal	Honda Center	—	1–1–0
3	September 30	San Jose	1–3		Gibson	Honda Center	—	1–2–0
4	October 2	@ Arizona	3–4		Stolarz	Gila River Arena	8,990	1–3–0
5	October 4	@ San Jose	3–2	SO	Gibson	SAP Center	6,192	2–3–0
6	October 6	Los Angeles	3–6		Stolarz	Honda Center	—	2–4–0
7	October 9	@ Los Angeles	4–3	SO	Gibson	Staples Center	12,132	3–4–0

=== Regular season ===
The regular season schedule was released on July 22, 2021, with a break in February because of the NHL's participation in the 2022 Winter Olympics.

2021–22 game log

October: 3–4–3 (home: 2–2–1; road: 1–2–2)
#	Date	Visitor	Score	Home	OT	Decision	Attendance	Record	Pts	Recap
1	October 13	Winnipeg	1–4	Anaheim		Gibson	16,260	1–0–0	2
2	October 15	Minnesota	2–1	Anaheim		Stolarz	11,938	1–1–0	2
3	October 18	Anaheim	3–2	Calgary	OT	Gibson	15,174	2–1–0	4
4	October 19	Anaheim	5–6	Edmonton		Stolarz	14,082	2–2–0	4
5	October 21	Anaheim	1–5	Winnipeg		Gibson	13,886	2–3–0	4
6	October 23	Anaheim	3–4	Minnesota	OT	Gibson	18,055	2–3–1	5
7	October 26	Winnipeg	4–3	Anaheim		Gibson	11,951	2–4–1	5
8	October 28	Buffalo	4–3	Anaheim	OT	Stolarz	12,014	2–4–2	6
9	October 29	Anaheim	4–5	Vegas	SO	Gibson	18,029	2–4–3	7
10	October 31	Montreal	2–4	Anaheim		Gibson	11,652	3–4–3	9

November: 9–4–0 (home: 6–2–0; road: 3–2–0)
#	Date	Visitor	Score	Home	OT	Decision	Attendance	Record	Pts	Recap
11	November 2	New Jersey	0–4	Anaheim		Gibson	13,252	4–4–3	11
12	November 5	Arizona	1–3	Anaheim		Stolarz	12,148	5–4–3	13
13	November 7	St. Louis	1–4	Anaheim		Gibson	12,056	6–4–3	15
14	November 9	Anaheim	3–2	Vancouver	SO	Gibson	18,201	7–4–3	17
15	November 11	Anaheim	7–4	Seattle		Gibson	17,151	8–4–3	19
16	November 14	Vancouver	1–5	Anaheim		Gibson	11,892	9–4–3	21
17	November 16	Washington	2–3	Anaheim	OT	Gibson	13,456	10–4–3	23
18	November 18	Carolina	2–1	Anaheim		Gibson	12,379	10–5–3	23
19	November 22	Anaheim	2–3	Nashville		Gibson	17,159	10–6–3	23
20	November 24	Anaheim	2–5	Colorado		Gibson	16,343	10–7–3	23
21	November 26	Ottawa	0–4	Anaheim		Stolarz	14,687	11–7–3	25
22	November 28	Toronto	5–1	Anaheim		Gibson	13,664	11–8–3	25
23	November 30	Anaheim	5–4	Los Angeles	SO	Gibson	15,276	12–8–3	27

December: 5–2–4 (home: 2–0–3; road: 3–2–1)
#	Date	Visitor	Score	Home	OT	Decision	Attendance	Record	Pts	Recap
24	December 1	Vegas	5–6	Anaheim		Stolarz	11,902	13–8–3	29
25	December 3	Calgary	4–3	Anaheim	SO	Gibson	12,427	13–8–4	30
26	December 6	Anaheim	3–4	Washington	SO	Gibson	18,573	13–8–5	31
27	December 7	Anaheim	2–0	Buffalo		Stolarz	8,133	14–8–5	33
28	December 9	Anaheim	2–1	Columbus	SO	Gibson	16,029	15–8–5	35
29	December 11	Anaheim	0–1	Pittsburgh		Gibson	17,435	15–9–5	35
30	December 12	Anaheim	3–2	St. Louis	OT	Stolarz	17,010	16–9–5	37
31	December 15	Seattle	1–4	Anaheim		Stolarz	14,762	17–9–5	39
32	December 17	Arizona	6–5	Anaheim	OT	Gibson	14,135	17–9–6	40
—	December 22–27	Season paused temporarily due to COVID-19 outbreaks throughout league.
33	December 29	Vancouver	2–1	Anaheim	OT	Gibson	11,866	17–9–7	41
34	December 31	Anaheim	1–3	Vegas		Gibson	18,022	17–10–7	41

January: 6–6–2 (home: 3–3–0; road: 3–3–2)
#	Date	Visitor	Score	Home	OT	Decision	Attendance	Record	Pts	Recap
35	January 2	Anaheim	2–4	Colorado		Gibson	17,305	17–11–7	41
36	January 4	Philadelphia	1–4	Anaheim		Gibson	11,375	18–11–7	43
—	January 6	Detroit		Anaheim	Postponed due to COVID-19. Makeup date: January 9.
37	January 8	NY Rangers	4–1	Anaheim		Stolarz	15,146	18–12–7	43
38	January 9	Detroit	3–4	Anaheim	SO	Dostal	12,043	19–12–7	45
39	January 11	Pittsburgh	4–1	Anaheim		Stolarz	11,431	19–13–7	45
40	January 14	Anaheim	3–7	Minnesota		Stolarz	18,300	19–14–7	45
41	January 15	Anaheim	0–3	Chicago		Dostal	18,488	19–15–7	45
42	January 19	Colorado	2–0	Anaheim		Gibson	11,240	19–16–7	45
43	January 21	Tampa Bay	1–5	Anaheim		Gibson	13,148	20–16–7	47
44	January 24	Anaheim	5–3	Boston		Gibson	17,850	21–16–7	49
45	January 26	Anaheim	3–4	Toronto	SO	Gibson	0 (BCD)	21–16–8	50
46	January 27	Anaheim	5–4	Montreal		Stolarz	0 (BCD)	22–16–8	52
47	January 29	Anaheim	2–1	Ottawa		Gibson	0 (BCD)	23–16–8	54
48	January 31	Anaheim	1–2	Detroit	OT	Gibson	14,545	23–16–9	55

February: 2–5–0 (home: 1–3–0; road: 1–2–0)
#	Date	Visitor	Score	Home	OT	Decision	Attendance	Record	Pts	Recap
49	February 11	Seattle	4–3	Anaheim		Gibson	12,530	23–17–9	55
50	February 16	Anaheim	2–6	Calgary		Gibson	9,639	23–18–9	55
51	February 17	Anaheim	3–7	Edmonton		Gibson	9,150	23–19–9	55
52	February 19	Anaheim	7–4	Vancouver		Gibson	18,932	24–19–9	57
53	February 22	San Jose	3–4	Anaheim	SO	Stolarz	13,288	25–19–9	59
54	February 25	Los Angeles	4–1	Anaheim		Gibson	17,174	25–20–9	59
55	February 27	NY Islanders	4–0	Anaheim		Stolarz	14,173	25–21–9	59

March: 2–9–3 (home: 2–5–1; road: 0–4–2)
#	Date	Visitor	Score	Home	OT	Decision	Attendance	Record	Pts	Recap
56	March 1	Boston	3–4	Anaheim		Gibson	11,567	26–21–9	61
57	March 4	Vegas	5–4	Anaheim		Gibson	12,586	26–22–9	61
58	March 6	San Jose	2–3	Anaheim	OT	Stolarz	12,183	27–22–9	63
59	March 8	Anaheim	3–8	Chicago		Stolarz	18,591	27–23–9	63
60	March 10	Anaheim	1–4	Nashville		Gibson	17,159	27–24–9	63
61	March 12	Anaheim	1–2	New Jersey	SO	Stolarz	14,783	27–24–10	64
62	March 13	Anaheim	3–4	NY Islanders		Gibson	17,255	27–25–10	64
63	March 15	Anaheim	3–4	NY Rangers	OT	Gibson	18,006	27–25–11	65
64	March 18	Florida	3–0	Anaheim		Gibson	12,296	27–26–11	65
65	March 21	Nashville	6–3	Anaheim		Gibson	11,679	27–27–11	65
66	March 23	Chicago	4–2	Anaheim		Gibson	11,740	27–28–11	65
67	March 26	Anaheim	1–4	San Jose		Dostal	14,161	27–29–11	65
68	March 29	Dallas	3–2	Anaheim		Gibson	12,617	27–30–11	65
69	March 31	Dallas	3–2	Anaheim	OT	Gibson	12,385	27–30–12	66

April: 4–7–2 (home: 1–4–0; road: 3–3–2)
#	Date	Visitor	Score	Home	OT	Decision	Attendance	Record	Pts	Recap
70	April 1	Anaheim	5–0	Arizona		Stolarz	13,587	28–30–12	68
71	April 3	Edmonton	6–1	Anaheim		Gibson	13,689	28–31–12	68
72	April 6	Calgary	4–2	Anaheim		Stolarz	13,417	28–32–12	68
73	April 9	Anaheim	5–3	Philadelphia		Stolarz	17,455	29–32–12	70
74	April 10	Anaheim	2–5	Carolina		Gibson	17,342	29–33–12	70
75	April 12	Anaheim	2–3	Florida	OT	Gibson	16,204	29–33–13	71
76	April 14	Anaheim	3–4	Tampa Bay	OT	Stolarz	19,092	29–33–14	72
77	April 17	Columbus	4–6	Anaheim		Gibson	13,635	30–33–14	74
78	April 19	Los Angeles	2–1	Anaheim		Gibson	17,174	30–34–14	74
79	April 23	Anaheim	2–4	Los Angeles		Stolarz	18,230	30–35–14	74
80	April 24	St. Louis	6–3	Anaheim		Gibson	17,446	30–36–14	74
81	April 26	Anaheim	5–2	San Jose		Stolarz	13,378	31–36–14	76
82	April 29	Anaheim	2–4	Dallas		Hodges	18,532	31–37–14	76

Legend: Win (2 points) Loss (0 points) Overtime/shootout loss (1 point)

== Player statistics ==
=== Skaters ===
Regular season
Player	GP	G	A	Pts	+/−	PIM
Troy Terry	75	37	30	67	−11	26
Trevor Zegras	75	23	38	61	−21	50
Adam Henrique	58	19	23	42	−2	14
Cam Fowler	76	9	33	42	−9	14
Ryan Getzlaf	56	3	34	37	−14	29
Kevin Shattenkirk	82	8	27	35	−9	36
Sonny Milano	66	14	20	34	−9	10
Jamie Drysdale	81	4	28	32	−26	16
Isac Lundestrom	80	16	13	29	−3	8
Derek Grant	71	15	14	29	−16	27
Rickard Rakell^{‡}	51	16	12	28	−7	8
Hampus Lindholm^{‡}	61	5	17	22	0	42
Jakob Silfverberg	53	5	16	21	−3	30
Sam Steel	68	6	14	20	−17	16
Sam Carrick	64	11	8	19	−12	85
Max Comtois	52	6	10	16	−17	46
Vinni Lettieri	31	5	5	10	−8	6
Nicolas Deslauriers^{‡}	61	5	5	10	−9	90
Josh Manson^{‡}	45	4	5	9	0	53
Josh Mahura	38	3	4	7	−14	12
Gerry Mayhew^{†}	15	5	1	6	−1	8
Buddy Robinson	32	1	5	6	+2	19
Simon Benoit	53	1	4	5	−5	22
Andrej Sustr^{†}	23	0	5	5	−3	10
Zach Aston-Reese^{†}	17	3	1	4	+1	6
Dominik Simon^{†}	17	0	4	4	0	6
Mason McTavish	9	2	1	3	+3	2
Benoit-Olivier Groulx	18	1	2	3	0	2
Greg Pateryn	10	1	1	2	0	10
Urho Vaakanainen^{†}	14	0	2	2	−5	6
Danny O'Regan	5	0	1	1	−1	0
Jacob Larsson	6	0	1	1	−3	2
Bryce Kindopp	1	0	0	0	0	0
Hunter Drew	2	0	0	0	0	5
Brendan Guhle	6	0	0	0	0	0
Max Jones	2	0	0	0	−1	15
Jacob Perreault	1	0	0	0	−1	0
Brayden Tracey	1	0	0	0	−1	0

=== Goaltenders ===
Regular season
Player	GP	GS	TOI	W	L	OT	GA	GAA	SA	SV%	SO	G	A	PIM
John Gibson	56	56	3,235:35	18	26	11	172	3.19	1,789	.904	1	0	1	12
Anthony Stolarz	28	23	1,506:25	12	8	3	67	2.67	809	.917	3	0	1	2
Lukas Dostal	4	3	201:27	1	2	0	10	2.98	108	.907	0	0	0	0
Tom Hodges	1	0	19:16	0	1	0	1	3.11	3	.667	0	0	0	0

^{†}Denotes player spent time with another team before joining the Ducks. Stats reflect time with the Ducks only.
^{‡}Denotes player was traded mid-season. Stats reflect time with the Ducks only.
Bold/italics denotes franchise record.

== Awards and honours ==
=== Awards ===
Regular season
Player	Award	Awarded

== Transactions ==
The Ducks have been involved in the following transactions during the 2021–22 season.

=== Trades ===
Date	Details		Ref
July 24, 2021	To Montreal Canadiens 3rd-round pick in 2022	To Anaheim Ducks CHI 3rd-round pick in 2021	
March 14, 2022	To Colorado Avalanche Josh Manson	To Anaheim Ducks Drew Helleson; 2nd-round pick in 2023	
March 19, 2022	To Minnesota Wild Nicolas Deslauriers	To Anaheim Ducks 3rd-round pick in 2023	
March 19, 2022	To Boston Bruins Hampus Lindholm; Kodie Curran	To Anaheim Ducks John Moore; Urho Vaakanainen; 1st-round pick in 2022; 2nd-round pick in 2023; 2nd-round pick in 2024	
March 21, 2022	To Pittsburgh Penguins Rickard Rakell	To Anaheim Ducks Zach Aston-Reese; Dominik Simon; Calle Clang; 2nd-round pick in 2022	

=== Players acquired ===
Date	Player	Former team	Term	Via	Ref
July 29, 2021	Danny O'Regan	Vegas Golden Knights	2-year	Free agency	
July 29, 2021	Greg Pateryn	San Jose Sharks	1-year	Free agency	
July 29, 2021	Brogan Rafferty	Vancouver Canucks	1-year	Free agency	
July 29, 2021	Buddy Robinson	Calgary Flames	1-year	Free agency	
January 11, 2022	Lucas Elvenes	Vegas Golden Knights		Waivers	
March 8, 2022	Andrej Sustr	Tampa Bay Lightning		Waivers	
March 20, 2022	Gerry Mayhew	Philadelphia Flyers		Waivers	
June 1, 2022	Pavol Regenda	HK Dukla Michalovce (Slovak Extraliga)	2-year	Free agency	

=== Players lost ===
Date	Player	New team	Term	Via	Ref
July 21, 2021	Haydn Fleury	Seattle Kraken		Expansion draft	
July 29, 2021	Andrew Agozzino	Ottawa Senators	1-year	Free agency	
July 29, 2021	Chase De Leo	New Jersey Devils	1-year	Free agency	
July 29, 2021	Danton Heinen	Pittsburgh Penguins	1-year	Free agency	
July 29, 2021	Andy Welinski	Calgary Flames	1-year	Free agency	
August 11, 2021	Andrew Poturalski	Carolina Hurricanes	1-year	Free agency	
September 2, 2021	Carter Rowney	Detroit Red Wings	1-year	Free agency	
September 9, 2021	David Backes	St. Louis Blues	1-day	Free agency	
May 24, 2022	Lucas Elvenes	HV71 (SHL)	2-year	Free agency	
July 5, 2022	Brendan Guhle	Eisbären Berlin (DEL)	1-year	Free agency	

=== Signings ===
Date	Player	Term	Contract type	Ref
July 13, 2021	Sam Carrick	1-year	Re-signing	
July 13, 2021	Trevor Carrick	1-year	Re-signing	
July 13, 2021	Vinni Lettieri	1-year	Re-signing	
July 17, 2021	Alexander Volkov	1-year	Re-signing	
July 28, 2021	Ryan Getzlaf	1-year	Re-signing	
August 7, 2021	Isac Lundestrom	1-year	Re-signing	
August 7, 2021	Sam Steel	1-year	Re-signing	
August 9, 2021	Max Comtois	2-year	Re-signing	
August 9, 2021	Max Jones	3-year	Re-signing	
August 9, 2021	Josh Mahura	2-year	Re-signing	
August 13, 2021	Mason McTavish	3-year	Entry-level	
August 13, 2021	Sasha Pastujov	3-year	Entry-level	
August 13, 2021	Olen Zellweger	3-year	Entry-level	
March 15, 2022	Drew Helleson	3-year	Entry-level	
March 27, 2022	Josh Lopina	3-year	Entry-level	
April 10, 2022	Blake McLaughlin	2-year	Entry-level	
April 26, 2022	Sam Carrick	2-year	Extension	
May 5, 2022	Calle Clang	3-year	Entry-level	

== Draft picks ==
Below are the Anaheim Ducks selections at the 2021 NHL entry draft, which will be held on July 23 and 24, 2021, virtually via video conference call from the NHL Network studios in Secaucus, New Jersey, due to the COVID-19 pandemic.

Round	#	Player	Pos	Nationality	College/Junior/Club team (League)
1	3	Mason McTavish	C	Canada	EHC Olten (SL)
2	34	Olen Zellweger	D	Canada	Everett Silvertips (WHL)
3	66	Sasha Pastujov	RW	United States	USNTDP Juniors (USHL)
3	76	Tyson Hinds	D	Canada	Rimouski Océanic (QMJHL)
4	98	Josh Lopina	C	United States	UMass Minutemen ice hockey (NCAA)
5	130	Sean Tschigerl	LW	Canada	Calgary Hitmen (WHL)
5	148	Gage Alexander	G	Canada	Winnipeg Ice (WHL)
6	162	Kyle Kukkonen	C	United States	Maple Grove Crimson (HS)
