= 2021–22 Tampa Bay Lightning season =

National Hockey League season

2021–22 Tampa Bay Lightning
- Eastern Conference champions
- Division: 3rd Atlantic
- Conference: 5th Eastern
- 2021–22 record: 51–23–8
- Home record: 27–8–6
- Road record: 24–15–2
- Goals for: 287
- Goals against: 233

Team information
- General manager: Julien BriseBois
- Coach: Jon Cooper
- Captain: Steven Stamkos
- Alternate captains: Victor Hedman; Alex Killorn; Ryan McDonagh
- Arena: Amalie Arena
- Average attendance: 19,092
- Minor league affiliates: Syracuse Crunch (AHL); Orlando Solar Bears (ECHL)

Team leaders
- Goals: Steven Stamkos (42)
- Assists: Victor Hedman (65)
- Points: Steven Stamkos (106)
- Penalty minutes: Patrick Maroon (134)
- Plus/minus: Victor Hedman (+26)
- Wins: Andrei Vasilevskiy (39)
- Goals against average: Brian Elliott (2.43)

The 2021–22 Tampa Bay Lightning season was the 30th season for the National Hockey League (NHL) franchise that was established on December 16, 1991. The Lightning entered the season as the two-time defending Stanley Cup champions.

The Lightning rejoined the Atlantic Division after a one-season stint in the Central Division due to re-alignment under league's return to play protocols. On April 14, 2022, the Lightning clinched a playoff berth after a 4–3 overtime win against the Anaheim Ducks. On June 11, 2022, the Lightning defeated the New York Rangers in Game 6 of the Eastern Conference Finals, clinching its third consecutive Stanley Cup Finals appearance and fifth overall. In addition, they also became the first team to clinch three consecutive Stanley Cup Finals appearances since the Edmonton Oilers (from 1983 to 1985), while also joining the Montreal Canadiens (from 1976 to 1980) and the New York Islanders (from 1980 to 1984) as the only teams in NHL history to post at least 11 consecutive playoff series victories. Despite the Lightning's playoff run, the team came up short for a third consecutive Stanley Cup title, falling to the Colorado Avalanche in six games.

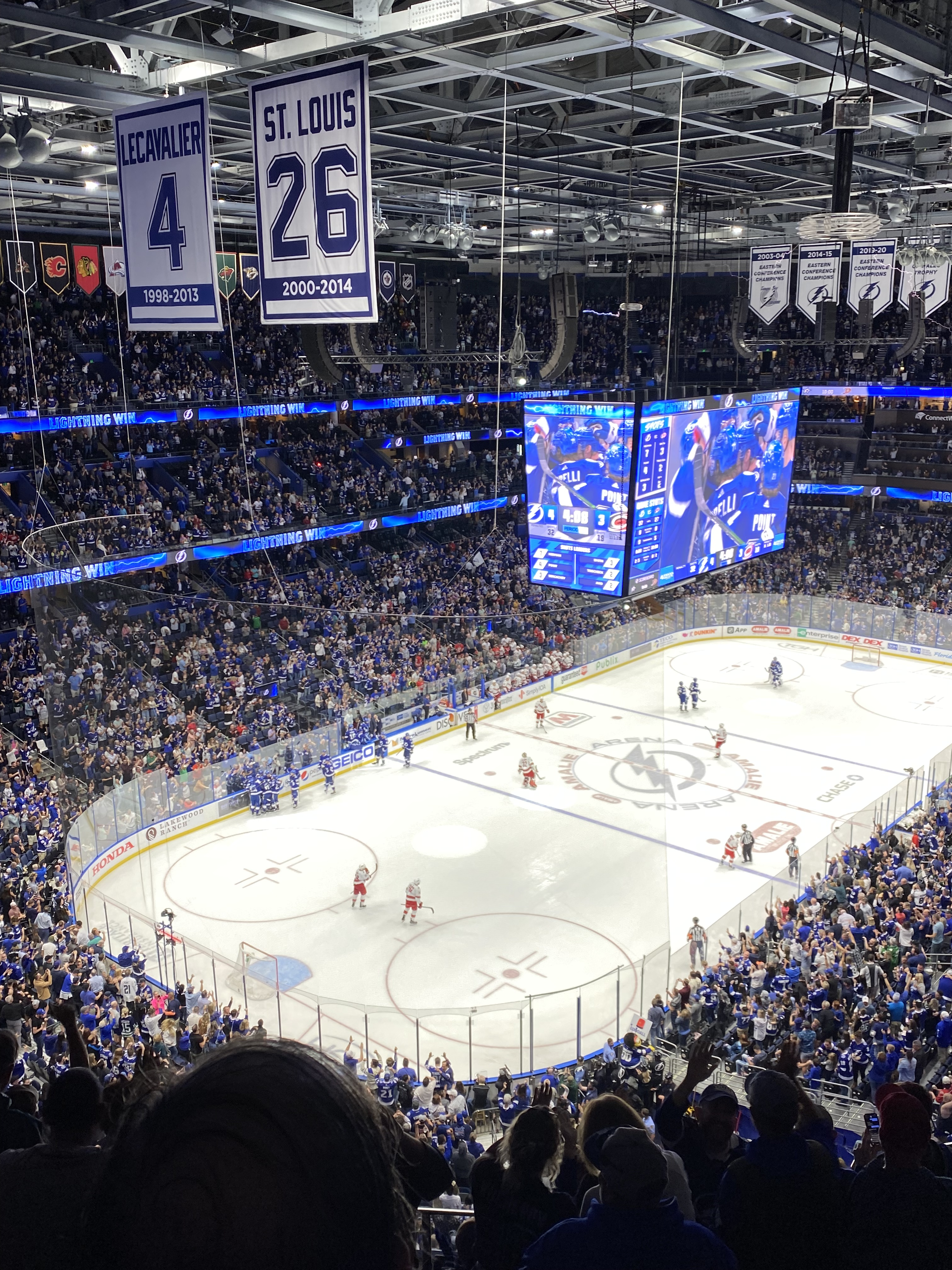
The Lightning take on the Carolina Hurricanes in March 2022.

As of the 2025–26 season this is the last time the Lightning have won a playoff series of any kind.

== Off-season ==
=== July ===
The Lightning's off-season began after becoming back to back champions with the winning of its third Stanley Cup in franchise history in a 4–1 series win over the Montreal Canadiens. The win also made the Lightning only the ninth franchise in NHL history to win a back to back championship.

On July 17, 2021, the Lightning announced the re-signing of defenseman Fredrik Claesson to a one-year, two-way contract. Claesson appeared in two regular season games with the Lightning after coming over via trade from the San Jose Sharks.

That same day, the Lightning traded the negotiating rights to forward Barclay Goodrow to the New York Rangers in exchange for a 7th-round pick in the 2022 NHL entry draft. Goodrow was a member of the Lightning's back to back championships.

On July 18, 2021, the NHL released the full list of players protected in the 2021 NHL expansion draft. The Lightning opted to protect Erik Cernak, Anthony Cirelli, Victor Hedman, Nikita Kucherov, Ryan McDonagh, Brayden Point, Mikhail Sergachev, captain Steven Stamkos and Andrei Vasilevskiy. This left Blake Coleman, Ross Colton, Cal Foote, Yanni Gourde, Tyler Johnson, Mathieu Joseph, Patrick Maroon, Curtis McElhinney, Ondrej Palat, Jan Rutta, Luke Schenn and Mitchell Stephens from their back to back championship rosters exposed for the Seattle Kraken to select.

On July 19, 2021, the Lightning announced that it had signed a 2-year extension with the Orlando Solar Bears to keep it as its ECHL affiliate.

On July 21, 2021, the Seattle Kraken selected forward Yanni Gourde during their expansion draft from the Lightning. Gourde spent the past six seasons with the team. He skated in 310 games, recording 80 goals, 107 assists and winner of 2 Stanley Cups.

On July 24, 2021, the Lightning announced that it had re-signed forward Gemel Smith to a 2-year contract extension. Smith appeared in five games with the Lightning during the regular season, recording three assists.

On July 24 and 25, 2021, the Lightning made seven selections in the 2021. The Lightning picked 4 forwards and 3 defensemen. The following players made up their picks: Roman Schmidt (D), Dylan Duke (LW), Cameron MacDonald (C), Alex Gagne (D), Daniil Pylenkov (D), Robert Flinton (LW) and Niko Huuhtanen (RW).

On July 26, 2021, the Lightning announced that it had issued qualify offers to restricted free agents Alex Barre-Boulet, Ross Colton, Boris Katchouk, Taylor Raddysh, Otto Somppi, Sean Day and Cal Foote. Former draft picks Ryan Lohin and Dominik Masin were not issued qualifying offers, which resulted in them becoming unrestricted free agents.

On July 27, 2021, the Lightning announced that it had re-signed Otto Somppi to a one-year contract extension. Somppi appeared in 32 games with the Syracuse Crunch last season, recording 12 goals and 26 points.

Later that evening, the Lightning reached an agreement with the Chicago Blackhawks to trade Tyler Johnson and a 2nd-round pick in the 2023 NHL entry draft in exchange for defensemen Brent Seabrook. Johnson spent the past 9-seasons with the Lightning. This past season he scored 8 goals and 14 assists in 55 regular season games. Johnson also scored 4 goals and 3 assists in playoffs during the Lightning's playoff run to the team's 3rd championship. The Lightning will be using Seabrook's cap hit to stay cap compliant by placing him on long term injured reserve (LTIR) at the start of the season.

On July 28, 2021, the Lightning began the first day of free agency by announcing the signing of free agents Gabriel Dumont, Charles Hudon, Darren Raddysh, Andrej Sustr and Maxime Legace to one-year contracts. Dumont and Sustr had both previously played for the team. Darren Raddysh is the brother of Lightning prospect Taylor Raddysh.

The next free agent signing announced by the Lightning was that of goaltender Brian Elliott. The team signed Elliott to a one-year contract valued at $900k. Elliott spent the previous three seasons with the Philadelphia Flyers. Elliott was signed as the replacement of Curtis McElhinney as the team's backup goaltender.

The next signing was 2020 Stanley Cup champion Zach Bogosian. Bogosian left the team as a free agent after helping the team to its second Stanley Cup by signing a one-year deal with the Toronto Maple Leafs. Bogosian signed a three-year contract that carries an annual cap hit of $850,000.

The team next announced that it had signed Brayden Point to an 8-year contract extension valued at $75 million. The Lightning draft pick has skated in 351 career NHL games with the team, recording 139 goals and 310 points. Point was also a member of the Lightning's back to back championships.

The Lightning moved back to free agent signings with the signing of Pierre-Edouard Bellemare to a two-year contract. The Bellemare contract will carry a cap hit of $1 million. Bellemare spent the past two seasons with the Colorado Avalanche. He recorded 18 goals and 15 assists during that timeframe.

The Lightning finished the day with the signing of free agent Remi Elie to a one-year contract. Elie has appeared in 106 career NHL games between the Dallas Stars and Buffalo Sabres. He spent the past season playing for the Rochester Americans of the American Hockey League.

On July 29, 2021, the Lightning announced the signing of forward Corey Perry to a two-year contract valued at $2 million. Perry joins the team after having lost to the team in consecutive finals with the Dallas Stars and Montreal Canadiens. Perry has been in the league for 16 years, recording 386 goals and 818 points over that span.

The same day the team announced that it had re-signed defenseman Cal Foote to a two-year contract extension. The contract is to carry a cap hit of $850k. Foote was drafted by the team in 2017, and has skated in 35 career NHL games.

On July 30, 2021, the Lightning announced the re-signing of forward Alex Barre-Boulet to a three-year contract extension. The contract will carry an annual cap hit of $758k. Barre-Boulet appeared in 15 games last season after making his NHL debut with the team.

That day the Lightning also announced that it had traded forward Mitchell Stephens to the Detroit Red Wings in exchange for 6th-round pick in the 2022 NHL entry draft. Stephens had played in 45 games with the Lightning over the past two seasons. Stephens had three goals and four assists in the Lightning's 2020 championship run.

Only July 31, 2021, the Lightning announced that it had re-signed forwards Taylor Raddysh and Boris Katchouk to three-year contract extensions. Both contracts will carry an annual cap hit of $758k. Raddysh has skated in 159 career AHL games, recording 49 goals and 110 points. Katchuouk has skated in 164 career AHL games, recording 36 goals and 89 points. Both forwards are expected to compete for the open roster spots at forward.

Later that day the team announced that it had traded goaltender Spencer Martin to the Vancouver Canucks for future considerations. Martin recorded a 7-5-2 recorded in 15 games last season with the Syracuse Crunch of the American Hockey League.

=== August ===
On August 1, 2021, the Lightning announced the re-signing of defenseman Sean Day to a one-year contract extension. Day appeared in 29 games with the Syracuse Crunch last season, recording 3 goals and 15 assists over 29 games.

On August 9, 2021, the Lightning announced the re-signing of Ross Colton to a two-year contract extension. The contract will carry an annual cap hit of $1.125 million. Colton made his NHL debut this past season, skating scoring 9 goals and 3 assists over 30-games. Colton was also just the seventh rookie in NHL history to score a Stanley Cup winning goal and the second in the NHL's modern era.

== Training camp ==
=== September ===
On September 21, 2021, the Lightning announced their 60-man 2021 training camp roster. The initial roster consists of 36 forwards, 18 defensemen and 6 goaltenders. Amongst the contracted players are 6 invitees that are not under contract with the Lightning.

On September 28, 2021, the Lightning signed General Manager Julien BriseBois to a contract extension. BriseBois was the General Manager of the team during their back to back cup wins and has been with the franchise since 2010.

On September 29, 2021, the Lightning announced their first round of training camp roster cuts. Forwards Jack Finley, Niko Huuhtanen, Cameron MacDonald and Declan McDonnell were reassigned to their junior clubs. Defenseman Roman Schmidt was also reassigned to his junior club. The Lightning also released Xavier Cormier and Avery Winslow from their camp tryouts.

=== October ===
On October 4, 2021, the Lightning announced its second round of training camp roster cuts. The team cut 13 forwards, 6 defensemen and 3 goaltenders. This reduced the roster to 18 forwards, 11 defensemen and 3 goaltenders.

Later in the day the team announced that it had cut four more players from its training camp roster. Gabriel Dumont, Charles Hudon, Sean Day and Darren Raddysh were assigned to the Syracuse Crunch to prepare for the start of the AHL season. This further trimmed the roster down to 16 forwards, 9 defensemen and 3 goaltenders.

On October 8, 2021, the Lightning announced the reduction of the training camp roster by two players. Simon Ryfors was assigned to the Syracuse Crunch of the AHL, and Amir Miftakhov was assigned to the Orlando Solar Bears of the ECHL. This brought the team's roster down to 15 forwards, 9 defensemen and 2 goaltenders.

On October 10, 2021, the Lightning placed Alex Barre-Boulet, Fredrik Claesson and Andrej Sustr on waivers for the purpose of assigning them to the Syracuse Crunch.

On October 11, 2021, the Lightning announced the re-signing of head coach Jon Cooper to a 3-year contract extension. The contract terms were not released, however, they are believed to be in the same ballpark as Joel Quenneville ($5.5 million per year).

Later that afternoon the Seattle Kraken claimed Alex Barre-Boulet off of waivers from the Lightning. Barre-Boulet skated in 15 games with the team last season.

The Lightning announced its opening night roster shortly after the waiver claim news broke. The forward group consisted of Pierre-Edouard Bellemare, Anthony Cirelli, Ross Colton, Mathieu Joseph, Boris Katchouk, Alex Killorn, Nikita Kucherov, Patrick Maroon, Ondrej Palat, Corey Perry, Brayden Point, Taylor Raddysh, Gemel Smith and Steven Stamkos. The defensemen group consisted of Zach Bogosian, Erik Cernak, Cal Foote, Victor Hedman, Ryan McDonagh, Jan Rutta and Mikhail Sergachev. The roster was rounded out with goaltenders Andrei Vasilevskiy and Brian Elliott.

== Standings ==
=== Divisional standings ===
Atlantic Division
Pos	Team	GP	W	L	OTL	RW	GF	GA	GD	Pts
1	p – Florida Panthers	82	58	18	6	42	340	246	+94	122
2	x – Toronto Maple Leafs	82	54	21	7	45	315	253	+62	115
3	x – Tampa Bay Lightning	82	51	23	8	39	287	233	+54	110
4	x – Boston Bruins	82	51	26	5	40	255	220	+35	107
5	Buffalo Sabres	82	32	39	11	25	232	290	−58	75
6	Detroit Red Wings	82	32	40	10	21	230	312	−82	74
7	Ottawa Senators	82	33	42	7	26	227	266	−39	73
8	Montreal Canadiens	82	22	49	11	16	221	319	−98	55

Source: National Hockey League
Rules for classification: 1) Fewer number of games played (GP, only during regular season); 2) Greater number of regulation wins (RW); 3) Greater number of wins in regulation and overtime, excluding shootout wins (ROW); 4) Greater number of total wins, including shootouts (W); 5) Greater number of points earned in head-to-head play; if teams played an uneven number of head-to-head games, the result of the first game on the home ice of the team with the extra home game is discarded; 6) Greater goal differential (GD); 7) Greater number of goals scored (GF)
p – Clinched Presidents' Trophy; x – Clinched playoff spot

=== Conference standings ===
Eastern Conference Wild Card
Pos	Div	Team	GP	W	L	OTL	RW	GF	GA	GD	Pts
1	AT	x – Boston Bruins	82	51	26	5	40	255	220	+35	107
2	ME	x – Washington Capitals	82	44	26	12	35	275	245	+30	100
3	ME	New York Islanders	82	37	35	10	34	231	237	−6	84
4	ME	Columbus Blue Jackets	82	37	38	7	26	262	300	−38	81
5	AT	Buffalo Sabres	82	32	39	11	25	232	290	−58	75
6	AT	Detroit Red Wings	82	32	40	10	21	230	312	−82	74
7	AT	Ottawa Senators	82	33	42	7	26	227	266	−39	73
8	ME	New Jersey Devils	82	27	46	9	19	248	307	−59	63
9	ME	Philadelphia Flyers	82	25	46	11	20	211	298	−87	61
10	AT	Montreal Canadiens	82	22	49	11	16	221	319	−98	55

Source: National Hockey League
Rules for classification: 1) Fewer number of games played (GP, only during regular season); 2) Greater number of regulation wins (RW); 3) Greater number of wins in regulation and overtime, excluding shootout wins (ROW); 4) Greater number of total wins, including shootouts (W); 5) Greater number of points earned in head-to-head play; if teams played an uneven number of head-to-head games, the result of the first game on the home ice of the team with the extra home game is discarded; 6) Greater goal differential (GD); 7) Greater number of goals scored (GF)
x – Clinched playoff spot

== Schedule and results ==
=== Preseason ===
2021 preseason game log: 3–4–0 (home: 3–1–0; road: 0–2–0; neutral: 0–1–0)

Game	Date	Opponent	Score	OT	Decision	Location	Attendance	Record	Recap
1	September 28	@ Carolina Hurricanes	1–3		Lagacé	PNC Arena	12,370	0–1–0	
2	September 30	Nashville Predators	2–6		Elliott	Amalie Arena	11,054	0–2–0	
3	October 1	Carolina Hurricanes	8–5		Alnefelt	Amalie Arena	12,509	1–2–0	
4	October 2	@ Nashville Predators	1–6		Elliott	Bridgestone Arena	14,884	1–3–0	
5	October 5	vs. Florida Panthers	2–3		Vasilevskiy	Amway Center		1–4–0	
6	October 7	Florida Panthers	6–2		Elliott	Amalie Arena	11,853	2–4–0	
7	October 9	@ Florida Panthers	4–2		Vasilevskiy	FLA Live Arena	12,221	3–4–0	

Lightning score listed first;

Win Loss Overtime/shootout loss

=== Regular season ===
The regular season schedule was released on July 22, 2021. Initially the Lightning were scheduled for only three games in February because NHL players were planning to participate in the 2022 Winter Olympics. The 2022 NHL All-Star Game was also scheduled to be held in February prior to the Olympics. On December 22, it was announced that NHL players would not play in the Olympics due to COVID-19 concerns, as well as the number of regular season games postponed throughout the league due to COVID-19. Having pulled out of the Olympics, the league plans to reschedule postponed games for dates in February, while the two-day all-star event is still planned to be held.

2021–22 regular season game log
October: 4–3–1, 9 points (home: 1–2–1; road: 3–1–0)

Game	Date	Opponent	Score	OT	Decision	Location	Attendance	Record	Points	Recap
1	October 12	Pittsburgh Penguins	2–6		Vasilevskiy	Amalie Arena	19,092	0–1–0	0	
2	October 14	@ Detroit Red Wings	7–6	OT	Vasilevskiy	Little Caesars Arena	19,515	1–1–0	2	
3	October 16	@ Washington Capitals	2–1	OT	Vasilevskiy	Capital One Arena	18,573	2–1–0	4	
4	October 19	Florida Panthers	1–4		Vasilevskiy	Amalie Arena	19,092	2–2–0	4	
5	October 23	Colorado Avalanche	3–4	SO	Vasilevskiy	Amalie Arena	19,092	2–2–1	5	
6	October 25	@ Buffalo Sabres	1–5		Elliott	KeyBank Center	7,417	2–3–1	5	
7	October 26	@ Pittsburgh Penguins	5–1		Vasilevskiy	PPG Paints Arena	15,732	3–3–1	7	
8	October 28	Arizona Coyotes	5–1		Vasilevskiy	Amalie Arena	19,092	4–3–1	9	

November: 8–2–3, 19 points (home: 6–1–1; road: 2–1–2)

Game	Date	Opponent	Score	OT	Decision	Location	Attendance	Record	Points	Recap
9	November 1	Washington Capitals	3–2		Vasilevskiy	Amalie Arena	19,092	5–3–1	11	
10	November 4	@ Toronto Maple Leafs	1–2	OT	Vasilevskiy	Scotiabank Arena	18,937	5–3–2	12	
11	November 6	@ Ottawa Senators	5–3		Elliott	Canadian Tire Centre	12,417	6–3–2	14	
12	November 9	Carolina Hurricanes	1–2	OT	Vasilevskiy	Amalie Arena	19,092	6–3–3	15	
13	November 13	Florida Panthers	3–2	OT	Vasilevskiy	Amalie Arena	19,092	7–3–3	17	
14	November 15	New York Islanders	4–1		Vasilevskiy	Amalie Arena	19,092	8–3–3	19	
15	November 18	@ Philadelphia Flyers	4–3	SO	Vasilevskiy	Wells Fargo Center	18,243	9–3–3	21	
16	November 20	New Jersey Devils	3–5		Vasilevskiy	Amalie Arena	19,092	9–4–3	21	
17	November 21	Minnesota Wild	5–4	SO	Elliott	Amalie Arena	19,092	10–4–3	23	
18	November 23	Philadelphia Flyers	4–0		Vasilevskiy	Amalie Arena	19,092	11–4–3	25	
19	November 26	Seattle Kraken	3–0		Vasilevskiy	Amalie Arena	19,092	12–4–3	27	
20	November 28	@ Minnesota Wild	2–4		Vasilevskiy	Xcel Energy Center	17,785	12–5–3	27	
21	November 30	@ St. Louis Blues	3–4	SO	Elliott	Enterprise Center	16,605	12–5–4	28	

December: 9–2–1, 19 points (home: 4–0–1; road: 5–2–0)

Game	Date	Opponent	Score	OT	Decision	Location	Attendance	Record	Points	Recap
22	December 2	St. Louis Blues	4–2		Vasilevskiy	Amalie Arena	19,092	13–5–4	30	
23	December 4	@ Boston Bruins	3–2	OT	Vasilevskiy	TD Garden	17,850	14–5–4	32	
24	December 5	@ Philadelphia Flyers	7–1		Elliott	Wells Fargo Center	16,014	15–5–4	34	
25	December 7	@ Montreal Canadiens	3–2		Vasilevskiy	Bell Centre	19,976	16–5–4	36	
26	December 9	@ Toronto Maple Leafs	5–3		Vasilevskiy	Scotiabank Arena	18,919	17–5–4	38	
27	December 11	@ Ottawa Senators	0–4		Elliott	Canadian Tire Centre	13,076	17–6–4	38	
28	December 14	Los Angeles Kings	3–2	OT	Vasilevskiy	Amalie Arena	19,092	18–6–4	40	
29	December 16	Ottawa Senators	2–1		Vasilevskiy	Amalie Arena	19,092	19–6–4	42	
—	December 18	@ Colorado Avalanche	Postponed due to multiple Colorado Avalanche players in COVID-19 protocols. Makeup date: February 10.							
30	December 21	@ Vegas Golden Knights	4–3		Vasilevskiy	T-Mobile Arena	18,217	20–6–4	44	
—	December 23	@ Arizona Coyotes	Postponed after agreement to begin holiday break earlier following other COVID-19 related postponements. Makeup date: February 11.							
31	December 28	Montreal Canadiens	5–4	OT	Lagace	Amalie Arena	19,092	21–6–4	46	
32	December 30	@ Florida Panthers	3–9		Lagace	FLA Live Arena	15,001	21–7–4	46	
33	December 31	New York Rangers	3–4	SO	Elliott	Amalie Arena	19,092	21–7–5	47	

January: 8–3–1, 17 points (home: 4–1–1; road: 4–2–0)

Game	Date	Opponent	Score	OT	Decision	Location	Attendance	Record	Points	Recap
34	January 2	@ New York Rangers	0–4		Vasilevskiy	Madison Square Garden	16,885	21–8–5	47	
35	January 4	@ Columbus Blue Jackets	7–2		Vasilevskiy	Nationwide Arena	14,816	22–8–5	49	
36	January 6	Calgary Flames	4–1		Vasilevskiy	Amalie Arena	19,092	23–8–5	51	
37	January 8	Boston Bruins	2–5		Vasilevskiy	Amalie Arena	19,092	23–9–5	51	
—	January 10	@ New Jersey Devils	Postponed due to multiple New Jersey Devils players in COVID-19 protocols. Makeup date: February 15.							
38	January 11	@ Buffalo Sabres	6–1		Vasilevskiy	KeyBank Center	8,368	24–9–5	53	
39	January 13	Vancouver Canucks	4–2		Vasilevskiy	Amalie Arena	19,092	25–9–5	55	
40	January 15	Dallas Stars	3–1		Vasilevskiy	Amalie Arena	19,092	26–9–5	57	
41	January 18	@ Los Angeles Kings	6–4		Vasilevskiy	Crypto.com Arena	15,128	27–9–5	59	
42	January 21	@ Anaheim Ducks	1–5		Vasilevskiy	Honda Center	13,148	27–10–5	59	
43	January 22	@ San Jose Sharks	7–1		Elliott	SAP Center	14,193	28–10–5	61	
44	January 27	New Jersey Devils	3–2		Vasilevskiy	Amalie Arena	19,092	29–10–5	63	
45	January 29	Vegas Golden Knights	2–3	SO	Vasilevskiy	Amalie Arena	19,092	29–10–6	64	

February: 5–1–0, 10 points (home: 2–0–0; road: 3–1–0)

Game	Date	Opponent	Score	OT	Decision	Location	Attendance	Record	Points	Recap
46	February 1	San Jose Sharks	3–2	OT	Vasilevskiy	Amalie Arena	19,092	30–10–6	66	
All-star break (February 4–5)
47	February 10	@ Colorado Avalanche	2–3		Vasilevskiy	Ball Arena	18,018	30–11–6	66	
48	February 11	@ Arizona Coyotes	4–3		Elliott	Gila River Arena	11,727	31–11–6	68	
49	February 15	@ New Jersey Devils	6–3		Vasilevskiy	Prudential Center	10,410	32–11–6	70	
50	February 23	Edmonton Oilers	5–3		Vasilevskiy	Amalie Arena	19,092	33–11–6	72	
51	February 26	@ Nashville Predators	3–2		Vasilevskiy	Nissan Stadium	68,619 (outdoors)	34–11–6	74	

March: 8–7–0, 16 points (home: 3–2–0; road: 5–5–0)

Game	Date	Opponent	Score	OT	Decision	Location	Attendance	Record	Points	Recap
52	March 1	Ottawa Senators	5–2		Vasilevskiy	Amalie Arena	19,092	35–11–6	76	
53	March 3	Pittsburgh Penguins	1–5		Vasilevskiy	Amalie Arena	19,092	35–12–6	76	
54	March 4	Detroit Red Wings	3–1		Elliott	Amalie Arena	19,092	36–12–6	78	
55	March 6	@ Chicago Blackhawks	6–3		Vasilevskiy	United Center	18,856	37–12–6	80	
56	March 8	@ Winnipeg Jets	4–7		Vasilevskiy	Canada Life Centre	12,925	37–13–6	80	
57	March 10	@ Calgary Flames	1–4		Vasilevskiy	Scotiabank Saddledome	15,689	37–14–6	80	
58	March 12	@ Edmonton Oilers	1–4		Elliott	Rogers Place	17,528	37–15–6	80	
59	March 13	@ Vancouver Canucks	2–1		Vasilevskiy	Rogers Arena	18,760	38–15–6	82	
60	March 16	@ Seattle Kraken	4–1		Vasilevskiy	Climate Pledge Arena	17,151	39–15–6	84	
61	March 19	New York Rangers	1–2		Vasilevskiy	Amalie Arena	19,092	39–16–6	84	
62	March 22	@ Carolina Hurricanes	2–3		Vasilevskiy	PNC Arena	16,783	39–17–6	84	
63	March 24	@ Boston Bruins	2–3		Vasilevskiy	TD Garden	17,850	39–18–6	84	
64	March 26	@ Detroit Red Wings	2–1	OT	Elliott	Little Caesars Arena	19,515	40–18–6	86	
65	March 27	@ New York Islanders	4–1		Vasilevskiy	UBS Arena	17,255	41–18–6	88	
66	March 29	Carolina Hurricanes	4–3	OT	Vasilevskiy	Amalie Arena	19,092	42–18–6	90	

April: 9–5–2, 20 points (home: 7–2–2; road: 2–3–0)

Game	Date	Opponent	Score	OT	Decision	Location	Attendance	Record	Points	Recap
67	April 1	Chicago Blackhawks	5–2		Vasilevskiy	Amalie Arena	19,092	43–18–6	92	
68	April 2	Montreal Canadiens	4–5	SO	Elliott	Amalie Arena	19,092	43–18–7	93	
69	April 4	Toronto Maple Leafs	2–6		Vasilevskiy	Amalie Arena	19,092	43–19–7	93	
70	April 6	@ Washington Capitals	3–4		Vasilevskiy	Capital One Arena	18,573	43–20–7	93	
71	April 8	Boston Bruins	1–2	OT	Vasilevskiy	Amalie Arena	19,092	43–20–8	94	
72	April 10	Buffalo Sabres	5–0		Elliott	Amalie Arena	19,092	44–20–8	96	
73	April 12	@ Dallas Stars	0–1		Vasilevskiy	American Airlines Center	17,567	44–21–8	96	
74	April 14	Anaheim Ducks	4–3	OT	Elliott	Amalie Arena	19,092	45–21–8	98	
75	April 16	Winnipeg Jets	7–4		Elliott	Amalie Arena	19,092	46–21–8	100	
76	April 19	Detroit Red Wings	3–4		Vasilevskiy	Amalie Arena	19,092	46–22–8	100	
77	April 21	Toronto Maple Leafs	8–1		Vasilevskiy	Amalie Arena	19,092	47–22–8	102	
78	April 23	Nashville Predators	6–2		Elliott	Amalie Arena	19,092	48–22–8	104	
79	April 24	@ Florida Panthers	8–4		Vasilevskiy	FLA Live Arena	17,036	49–22–8	106	
80	April 26	Columbus Blue Jackets	4–1		Vasilevskiy	Amalie Arena	19,092	50–22–8	108	
81	April 28	@ Columbus Blue Jackets	2–5		Elliott	Nationwide Arena	18,234	50–23–8	108	
82	April 29	@ New York Islanders	6–4		Vasilevskiy	UBS Arena	17,255	51–23–8	110	

Lightning score listed first;

Win (2 points) Loss (0 points) Overtime/shootout loss (1 point) Postponement

=== Playoffs ===
2022 Stanley Cup playoffs
Eastern Conference First Round vs. Toronto Maple Leafs (A2) - Tampa Bay won 4–3

Game	Date	Opponent	Score	OT	Decision	Location	Attendance	Series	Recap
1	May 2	@ Toronto Maple Leafs	0–5		Vasilevskiy	Scotiabank Arena	19,338	0–1	
2	May 4	@ Toronto Maple Leafs	5–3		Vasilevskiy	Scotiabank Arena	19,135	1–1	
3	May 6	Toronto Maple Leafs	2–5		Vasilevskiy	Amalie Arena	19,092	1–2	
4	May 8	Toronto Maple Leafs	7–3		Vasilevskiy	Amalie Arena	19,092	2–2	
5	May 10	@ Toronto Maple Leafs	3–4		Vasilevskiy	Scotiabank Arena	19,434	2–3	
6	May 12	Toronto Maple Leafs	4–3	OT	Vasilevskiy	Amalie Arena	19,092	3–3	
7	May 14	@ Toronto Maple Leafs	2–1		Vasilevskiy	Scotiabank Arena	19,316	4–3	

Eastern Conference Second Round vs. Florida Panthers (A1) - Tampa Bay won 4–0

Game	Date	Opponent	Score	OT	Decision	Location	Attendance	Series	Recap
1	May 17	@ Florida Panthers	4–1		Vasilevskiy	FLA Live Arena	19,656	1–0	
2	May 19	@ Florida Panthers	2–1		Vasilevskiy	FLA Live Arena	19,716	2–0	
3	May 22	Florida Panthers	5–1		Vasilevskiy	Amalie Arena	19,092	3–0	
4	May 23	Florida Panthers	2–0		Vasilevskiy	Amalie Arena	19,092	4–0	

Eastern Conference Finals vs. New York Rangers (M2) - Tampa Bay won 4–2

Game	Date	Opponent	Score	OT	Decision	Location	Attendance	Series	Recap
1	June 1	@ New York Rangers	2–6		Vasilevskiy	Madison Square Garden	18,006	0–1	
2	June 3	@ New York Rangers	2–3		Vasilevskiy	Madison Square Garden	18,006	0–2	
3	June 5	New York Rangers	3–2		Vasilevskiy	Amalie Arena	19,092	1–2	
4	June 7	New York Rangers	4–1		Vasilevskiy	Amalie Arena	19,092	2–2	
5	June 9	@ New York Rangers	3–1		Vasilevskiy	Madison Square Garden	18,006	3–2	
6	June 11	New York Rangers	2–1		Vasilevskiy	Amalie Arena	19,092	4–2	

Stanley Cup Finals vs. Colorado Avalanche (C1) - Colorado won 4–2

Game	Date	Opponent	Score	OT	Decision	Location	Attendance	Series	Recap
1	June 15	@ Colorado Avalanche	3–4	OT	Vasilevskiy	Ball Arena	17,778	0–1	
2	June 18	@ Colorado Avalanche	0–7		Vasilevskiy	Ball Arena	17,849	0–2	
3	June 20	Colorado Avalanche	6–2		Vasilevskiy	Amalie Arena	19,092	1–2	
4	June 22	Colorado Avalanche	2–3	OT	Vasilevskiy	Amalie Arena	19,092	1–3	
5	June 24	@ Colorado Avalanche	3–2		Vasilevskiy	Ball Arena	18,015	2–3	
6	June 26	Colorado Avalanche	1–2		Vasilevskiy	Amalie Arena	19,092	2–4	

Lightning score listed first;

Win Loss If necessary

== Player stats ==
Final

=== Skaters ===
Regular season
Player	GP	G	A	Pts	+/−	PIM
Steven Stamkos	81	42	64	106	24	36
Victor Hedman	82	20	65	85	26	36
Nikita Kucherov	47	25	44	69	1	22
Alex Killorn	82	25	34	59	1	66
Brayden Point	66	28	30	58	−5	33
Ondrej Palat	77	18	31	49	15	20
Anthony Cirelli	76	17	26	43	15	70
Corey Perry	82	19	21	40	9	66
Ross Colton	79	22	17	39	4	24
Mikhail Sergachev	78	7	31	38	6	59
Patrick Maroon	81	11	16	27	20	134
Ryan McDonagh	71	4	22	26	15	16
Pierre-Edouard Bellemare	80	9	11	20	24	19
Mathieu Joseph^{‡}	58	8	10	18	4	23
Jan Rutta	76	3	15	18	25	47
Nick Paul^{†}	21	5	9	14	4	17
Erik Cernak	54	1	12	13	7	46
Taylor Raddysh^{‡}	53	5	7	12	5	8
Cal Foote	56	2	7	9	6	29
Zach Bogosian	48	3	5	8	2	53
Brandon Hagel^{†}	22	4	3	7	−4	8
Boris Katchouk^{‡}	38	2	4	6	3	25
Alex Barre-Boulet^{†}	14	3	2	5	0	4
Andrej Sustr^{‡}	15	1	0	1	−1	6
Gabriel Fortier	10	1	0	1	−2	4
Riley Nash^{†‡}	10	0	0	0	−1	2
Fredrik Claesson	9	0	0	0	−3	0
Darren Raddysh	4	0	0	0	1	0
Sean Day	2	0	0	0	−2	0
Remi Elie	1	0	0	0	−2	0

- Most goals, assists and points in a single season by a Lightning defenseman

Playoffs
Player	GP	G	A	Pts	+/−	PIM
Nikita Kucherov	23	8	19	27	7	14
Ondrej Palat	23	11	10	21	10	10
Steven Stamkos	23	11	8	19	7	25
Victor Hedman	23	3	16	19	2	10
Corey Perry	23	6	5	11	−2	26
Mikhail Sergachev	23	2	8	10	7	18
Nick Paul	23	5	4	9	0	6
Ross Colton	23	5	4	9	−2	13
Anthony Cirelli	23	3	5	8	1	8
Patrick Maroon	23	4	2	6	4	32
Brandon Hagel	23	2	4	6	0	25
Brayden Point	9	2	3	5	−7	4
Ryan McDonagh	23	1	4	5	1	14
Jan Rutta	17	1	4	5	5	17
Alex Killorn	23	0	4	4	−5	12
Pierre-Edouard Bellemare	23	2	1	3	0	6
Zach Bogosian	22	0	3	3	0	4
Erik Cernak	23	1	1	2	1	12
Cal Foote	13	0	2	2	2	12
Riley Nash	8	0	0	0	0	2

=== Goaltenders ===
Regular season
Player	GP	GS	TOI	W	L	OT	GA	GAA	SA	SV%	SO	G	A	PIM
Andrei Vasilevskiy	63	63	3761	39	18	5	156	2.49	1868	.916	2	0	1	4
Brian Elliott	19	17	1007	11	4	3	43	2.43	489	.912	1	0	0	0
Maxime Lagace	2	2	99	1	1	0	10	6.11	58	.828	0	0	0	0
Hugo Alnefelt	1	0	20	0	0	0	3	9.00	10	.700	0	0	0	0

Playoffs
Player	GP	GS	TOI	W	L	GA	GAA	SA	SV%	SO	G	A	PIM
Andrei Vasilevskiy	23	23	1403	14	9	59	2.52	752	.922	1	0	0	0

^{†}Denotes player spent time with another team before joining Tampa Bay. Stats reflect time with Tampa Bay only.
^{‡}Traded from Tampa Bay mid-season.
Bold/italics denotes franchise record

== Suspensions/fines ==
Player	Explanation	Length	Salary	Date issued
Mikhail Sergachev	Suspended for an illegal check to the head on Mitch Marner during the regular season game against the Toronto Maple Leafs on November 4, 2021, at Scotiabank Arena.	2 games	$48,000	November 5, 2021
Patrick Maroon	Fined for Unsportsmanlike Conduct during the game against the Toronto Maple Leafs on May 2, 2022, at Scotiabank Arena.	—	$2,250	May 3, 2022
Corey Perry	Fined for Unsportsmanlike Conduct during the game against the Toronto Maple Leafs on May 2, 2022, at Scotiabank Arena.	—	$2,250	May 3, 2022

== Awards and honours ==
=== Awards ===
Regular season
Player	Award	Awarded
Steven Stamkos	NHL Third Star of the Week	October 18, 2021
Alex Killorn	NHL Third Star of the Week	November 1, 2021
Victor Hedman	NHL Second Star of the Week	December 6, 2021
Victor Hedman	2022 National Hockey League All-Star Game	January 13, 2022
Andrei Vasilevskiy	2022 National Hockey League All-Star Game	January 13, 2022
Nikita Kucherov	NHL Third Star of the Week	January 17, 2022
Steven Stamkos	2022 National Hockey League All-Star Game	January 18, 2022
Steven Stamkos	NHL Third Star of the Week	February 28, 2022
Steven Stamkos	NHL First Star of the Week	April 25, 2022
Steven Stamkos	NHL First Star of the Month	April 30, 2022

=== Milestones ===
Regular season
Player	Milestone	Reached
Taylor Raddysh	1st career NHL game	October 12, 2021
Boris Katchouk	1st career NHL game	October 16, 2021
Corey Perry	1100th career NHL game	October 25, 2021
Pierre-Edouard Bellemare	100th career NHL point	October 26, 2021
Alex Killorn	200th career NHL assist	October 28, 2021
Taylor Raddysh	1st career NHL point 1st career NHL assist	November 1, 2021
Boris Katchouk	1st career NHL point 1st career NHL assist	November 13, 2021
Mikhail Sergachev	300th career NHL game	November 23, 2021
Andrei Vasilevskiy	200th career NHL win	November 26, 2021
Gabriel Fortier	1st career NHL game	November 30, 2021
Zach Bogosian	700th career NHL game	December 2, 2021
Taylor Raddysh	1st career NHL goal	December 4, 2021
Boris Katchouk	1st career NHL goal	December 5, 2021
Jon Cooper	400th career NHL win	December 9, 2021
Steven Stamkos	900th career NHL point	December 16, 2021
Gabriel Fortier	1st career NHL goal 1st career NHL point	December 21, 2021
Sean Day	1st career NHL game	December 28, 2021
Darren Raddysh	1st career NHL game	December 30, 2021
Hugo Alnefelt	1st career NHL game	December 30, 2021
Riley Nash	600th career NHL game	December 30, 2021
Patrick Maroon	600th career NHL game	December 31, 2021
Ondrej Palat	400th career NHL point	January 4, 2022
Nikita Kucherov	4th career NHL hat trick	January 11, 2022
Mathieu Joseph	200th career NHL game	January 15, 2022
Corey Perry	400th career NHL goal	February 23, 2022
Ondrej Palat	600th career NHL game	March 4, 2022
Erik Cernak	200th career NHL game	March 8, 2022
Alex Killorn	700th career NHL game	March 13, 2022
Steven Stamkos	900th career NHL game	March 16, 2022
Brayden Point	400th career NHL game	March 24, 2022
Jon Cooper	700th career NHL game	April 1, 2022
Ross Colton	100th career NHL game	April 12, 2022
Nikita Kucherov	600th career NHL point	April 21, 2022
Alex Killorn	400th career NHL point	April 21, 2022
Brayden Point	200th career NHL assist	April 23, 2022
Victor Hedman	600th career NHL point	April 26, 2022
Steven Stamkos	10th career NHL hat trick	April 29, 2022

Playoffs
Player	Milestone	Reached
Cal Foote	1st career playoff game	May 2, 2022
Nick Paul	1st career playoff game	May 2, 2022
Brandon Hagel	1st career playoff game	May 2, 2022
Nick Paul	1st career playoff assist 1st career playoff point	May 4, 2022
Brandon Hagel	1st career playoff goal 1st career playoff point	May 4, 2022
Cal Foote	1st career playoff assist 1st career playoff point	May 8, 2022
Brandon Hagel	1st career playoff assist	May 8, 2022
Steven Stamkos	100th career playoff game	May 12, 2022
Nick Paul	1st career playoff goal	May 14, 2022
Corey Perry	50th career playoff goal	May 22, 2022
Nikita Kucherov	50th career playoff goal	June 5, 2022
Victor Hedman	100th career playoff point	June 5, 2022
Nikita Kucherov	100th career playoff assist	June 15, 2022
Andrei Vasilevskiy	100th career playoff game	June 18, 2022

=== Records ===
Regular season
Player	Record	Reached
Ondrej Palat	10th most goals in Lightning history, which passed Vaclav Prospal (127)	October 26, 2021
Steven Stamkos	Most game winning goals in Lightning history, which passed Martin St. Louis (64)	December 21, 2021
Brayden Point	10th most points in Lightning history, which passed Tyler Johnson (361)	April 1, 2022
Steven Stamkos	Most NHL All-Star Game selections, which passed Martin St. Louis (6)	January 18, 2022
Victor Hedman	Most points in a single season by a Lightning defensemen, which passed his previous record (72)	April 19, 2022
Steven Stamkos	Most points in Lightning history, which passed Martin St. Louis (953)	April 21, 2022
Victor Hedman	Most goals in a single season by a Lightning defensemen, which tied Dan Boyle (20)	April 21, 2022
Victor Hedman	Most assists in a single season by a Lightning defensemen, which passed his previous record (56)	April 23, 2022
Brayden Point	10th most assists in Lightning history, which passed Tyler Johnson (200)	April 24, 2022
Steven Stamkos	2nd most assists in Lightning history, which tied Vincent Lecavalier (491)	April 28, 2022
Steven Stamkos	Most consecutive multipoint games in Lightning history, which passed Vincent Lecavalier (8)	April 29, 2022
Victor Hedman	Most NHL All-Star team selections, which passed Martin St. Louis (5)	June 21, 2022

Playoffs
Player	Record	Reached
Brayden Point	Most overtime playoff goals in Lightning history, which tied Martin St. Louis (3)	May 12, 2022
Ondrej Palat	Most game winning goals in Lightning history, which passed Tyler Johnson (9)	June 5, 2022

== Transactions ==
The Lightning have been involved in the following transactions during the 2021–22 season.

=== Trades ===
Date	Details		Ref
July 17, 2021	To New York Rangers Barclay Goodrow	To Tampa Bay Lightning 7th-round pick in 2022	
July 24, 2021	To Montreal Canadiens 4th-round pick in 2022	To Tampa Bay Lightning 4th-round pick in 2021	
July 27, 2021	To Chicago Blackhawks Tyler Johnson; 2nd-round pick in 2023	To Tampa Bay Lightning Brent Seabrook	
July 30, 2021	To Detroit Red Wings Mitchell Stephens	To Tampa Bay Lightning 6th-round pick in 2022	
July 31, 2021	To Vancouver Canucks Spencer Martin	To Tampa Bay Lightning Future Considerations	
February 1, 2022	To Dallas Stars Alexei Lipanov	To Tampa Bay Lightning Tye Felhaber	
February 1, 2022	To Nashville Predators Jimmy Huntington	To Tampa Bay Lightning Anthony Richard	
March 18, 2022	To Chicago Blackhawks Taylor Raddysh; Boris Katchouk; 1st-round pick in 2023; 1st-round pick in 2024	To Tampa Bay Lightning Brandon Hagel; 4th-round pick in 2022; 4th-round pick in 2024	
March 20, 2022	To Ottawa Senators Mathieu Joseph; 4th-round pick in 2024	To Tampa Bay Lightning Nick Paul	
March 21, 2022	To Arizona Coyotes Future Considerations	To Tampa Bay Lightning Riley Nash	
March 21, 2022	To San Jose Sharks Antoine Morand	To Tampa Bay Lightning Alexei Melnichuk	
July 3, 2022	To Nashville Predators Ryan McDonagh	To Tampa Bay Lightning Philippe Myers; Grant Mismash	

=== Free agents ===
Date	Player	Team	Contract term	Ref
July 28, 2021	Gabriel Dumont	from Minnesota Wild	1-year	
July 28, 2021	Charles Hudon	from Lausanne HC	1-year	
July 28, 2021	Darren Raddysh	from Hartford Wolf Pack	1-year	
July 28, 2021	Andrej Sustr	from HC Kunlun Red Star	1-year	
July 28, 2021	Maxime Legace	from Pittsburgh Penguins	1-year	
July 28, 2021	Brian Elliott	from Philadelphia Flyers	1-year	
July 28, 2021	Zach Bogosian	from Toronto Maple Leafs	3-year	
July 28, 2021	Pierre-Edouard Bellemare	from Colorado Avalanche	2-year	
July 28, 2021	Remi Elie	from Rochester Americans	1-year	
July 28, 2021	Blake Coleman	to Calgary Flames	6-year	
July 28, 2021	David Savard	to Montreal Canadiens	4-year	
July 28, 2021	Luke Schenn	to Vancouver Canucks	2-year	
July 28, 2021	Andreas Borgman	to Dallas Stars	1-year	
July 29, 2021	Corey Perry	from Montreal Canadiens	2-year	
August 25, 2021	Ben Thomas	to Leksands IF	1-year	
October 2, 2021	Ryan Lohin	to Charlotte Checkers	1-year	
March 1, 2022	Bennett MacArthur	from Acadie-Bathurst Titan	3-year	
March 16, 2022	Declan Carlile	from Merrimack Warriors	2-year	
March 20, 2022	Ilya Usau	from Dinamo Minsk	3-year	
June 6, 2022	Otto Somppi	to Lukko	1-year	
June 9, 2022	Gabriel Dumont	to Syracuse Crunch	2-year	

=== Waivers ===
Date	Player	Team	Ref
October 11, 2021	Alex Barre-Boulet	to Seattle Kraken	
October 22, 2021	Alex Barre-Boulet	from Seattle Kraken	
December 7, 2021	Riley Nash	from Winnipeg Jets	
January 6, 2022	Riley Nash	to Arizona Coyotes	
January 19, 2022	Gemel Smith	to Detroit Red Wings	
February 19, 2022	Gemel Smith	from Detroit Red Wings	
March 8, 2022	Andrej Sustr	to Anaheim Ducks	

=== Contract terminations ===
Date	Player	Via	Ref
July 1, 2022	Amir Miftakhov	Contract termination	

=== Retirement ===
Date	Player	Ref
September 25, 2021	Curtis McElhinney	

=== Signings ===
Date	Player	Contract term	Ref
July 17, 2021	Fredrik Claesson	1-year	
July 23, 2021	Gemel Smith	2-year	
July 27, 2021	Otto Somppi	1-year	
July 28, 2021	Brayden Point	8-year	
July 29, 2021	Cal Foote	2-year	
July 30, 2021	Alex Barre-Boulet	3-year	
July 31, 2021	Taylor Raddysh	3-year	
July 31, 2021	Boris Katchouk	3-year	
August 1, 2021	Sean Day	1-year	
August 9, 2021	Ross Colton	2-year	
December 9, 2021	Roman Schmidt	3-year	
February 8, 2022	Patrick Maroon	2-year	
March 31, 2022	Nick Perbix	1-year	
April 15, 2022	Brian Elliott	1-year	
May 21, 2022	Jaydon Dureau	3-year	
June 16, 2022	Sean Day	1-year	
June 20, 2022	Simon Ryfors	1-year	
June 30, 2022	Darren Raddysh	2-year	
July 1, 2022	Nick Paul	7-year	

== Draft picks ==
Below are the Tampa Bay Lightning's selections at the 2021 NHL entry draft, which was held on July 23 and 24, 2021, via video conference call due to the COVID-19 pandemic.

Round	#	Player	Pos	Nationality	College/Junior/Club team (League)
3	96	Roman Schmidt	D	United States	U.S. National Development Program (USHL)
4	126^{1}	Dylan Duke	LW	United States	U.S. National Development Program (USHL)
5	160	Cameron MacDonald	C	Canada	Saint John Sea Dogs (QMJH)
6	192	Alex Gagne	D	United States	Muskegon Lumberjacks (USHL)
7	196^{2}	Daniil Pylenkov	D	Russia	HC Vityaz (KHL)
7	211^{3}	Robert Flinton	LW	United States	St. Paul's Prep School (ESA)
7	224	Niko Huuhtanen	RW	Finland	Tappara Jr. (Jr. A SM-Liiga)

Notes:

1. The Vegas Golden Knights' fourth-round pick went to the Tampa Bay Lightning as the result of a trade on July 24, 2021, that sent a fourth-round pick in 2022 to Montreal in exchange for this pick.
2. The New Jersey Devils' seventh-round pick went to the Tampa Bay Lightning as the result of a trade on November 1, 2019, that sent Louis Domingue to New Jersey in exchange for this pick (being conditional at the time of the trade).
3. The Nashville Predators' seventh-round pick went to the Tampa Bay Lightning as the result of a trade on June 14, 2019, that sent Connor Ingram to Nashville in exchange for this pick.
