= 2021–22 New York Rangers season =

National Hockey League season

2021–22 New York Rangers
- Division: 2nd Metropolitan
- Conference: 4th Eastern
- 2021–22 record: 52–24–6
- Home record: 27–10–4
- Road record: 25–14–2
- Goals for: 254
- Goals against: 207

Team information
- General manager: Chris Drury
- Coach: Gerard Gallant
- Captain: Vacant
- Alternate captains: Barclay Goodrow; Chris Kreider; Artemi Panarin; Ryan Strome; Jacob Trouba; Mika Zibanejad
- Arena: Madison Square Garden
- Average attendance: 16,839
- Minor league affiliates: Hartford Wolf Pack (AHL); Jacksonville Icemen (ECHL)

Team leaders
- Goals: Chris Kreider (52)
- Assists: Artemi Panarin (74)
- Points: Artemi Panarin (96)
- Penalty minutes: Jacob Trouba (88)
- Plus/minus: Mika Zibanejad (+30)
- Wins: Igor Shesterkin (36)
- Goals against average: Keith Kinkaid (2.00)

The 2021–22 New York Rangers season was the franchise's 95th season of play and their 96th season overall. Before the season, the Rangers lost Colin Blackwell to the Seattle Kraken in the 2021 NHL expansion draft.

The Rangers retired the no. 30 jersey in honor of Henrik Lundqvist on January 28, 2022.

During the season the team commemorated Rod Gilbert, who died in August 2021, with a no. 7 shoulder patch on their jerseys. Additionally, the Rangers created the Rod Gilbert "Mr. Ranger" Award, which will be given annually to the player "who best honors Rod's legacy by exemplifying leadership qualities both on and off the ice, and making a significant humanitarian contribution to his community."

On December 3, 2021, after a 1–0 win over the San Jose Sharks, Rangers goaltenders Igor Shesterkin and Alexandar Georgiev had a first combined shutout since Henrik Lundqvist and Antti Raanta achieved it during a 2–0 victory over the Dallas Stars on December 15, 2016.

Three Rangers were selected to participate in the 2022 NHL All-Star Game – Chris Kreider, Adam Fox, and Mika Zibanejad. However, for personal reasons, Zibanejad did not attend the game. It was the 34th time in franchise history that the Rangers have had three or more players selected to the same All-Star Game and first since the 2011–12 season with Henrik Lundqvist, Daniel Girardi and Marián Gáborík. At the conclusion of the regular season, Shesterkin was nominated for and eventually won the Vezina Trophy, and was also named to the NHL first All-Star team.

On April 9, 2022, the Rangers clinched a playoff berth after a 5–1 win against the Ottawa Senators. In the first round of the 2022 Stanley Cup playoffs, the Rangers trailed 3–1 after the first four games of the series, but won the next three games against the Pittsburgh Penguins and won the series 4–3. This was the third time in franchise history that the Rangers won the seven-game series after trailing 3–1 (2013–14 and 2014–15). The Rangers qualified for the conference finals for the first time since the 2014–15 season after they defeated the Carolina Hurricanes in seven games in the second round. They would go on to lose to the Tampa Bay Lightning in six games.

== Standings ==
=== Divisional standings ===
Metropolitan Division
Pos	Team	GP	W	L	OTL	RW	GF	GA	GD	Pts
1	y – Carolina Hurricanes	82	54	20	8	47	278	202	+76	116
2	x – New York Rangers	82	52	24	6	44	254	207	+47	110
3	x – Pittsburgh Penguins	82	46	25	11	37	272	229	+43	103
4	x – Washington Capitals	82	44	26	12	35	275	245	+30	100
5	New York Islanders	82	37	35	10	34	231	237	−6	84
6	Columbus Blue Jackets	82	37	38	7	26	262	300	−38	81
7	New Jersey Devils	82	27	46	9	19	248	307	−59	63
8	Philadelphia Flyers	82	25	46	11	20	211	298	−87	61

Source: National Hockey League
Rules for classification: 1) Fewer number of games played (GP, only during regular season); 2) Greater number of regulation wins (RW); 3) Greater number of wins in regulation and overtime, excluding shootout wins (ROW); 4) Greater number of total wins, including shootouts (W); 5) Greater number of points earned in head-to-head play; if teams played an uneven number of head-to-head games, the result of the first game on the home ice of the team with the extra home game is discarded; 6) Greater goal differential (GD); 7) Greater number of goals scored (GF)
x – Clinched playoff spot; y – Clinched division

=== Conference standings ===
Eastern Conference Wild Card
Pos	Div	Team	GP	W	L	OTL	RW	GF	GA	GD	Pts
1	AT	x – Boston Bruins	82	51	26	5	40	255	220	+35	107
2	ME	x – Washington Capitals	82	44	26	12	35	275	245	+30	100
3	ME	New York Islanders	82	37	35	10	34	231	237	−6	84
4	ME	Columbus Blue Jackets	82	37	38	7	26	262	300	−38	81
5	AT	Buffalo Sabres	82	32	39	11	25	232	290	−58	75
6	AT	Detroit Red Wings	82	32	40	10	21	230	312	−82	74
7	AT	Ottawa Senators	82	33	42	7	26	227	266	−39	73
8	ME	New Jersey Devils	82	27	46	9	19	248	307	−59	63
9	ME	Philadelphia Flyers	82	25	46	11	20	211	298	−87	61
10	AT	Montreal Canadiens	82	22	49	11	16	221	319	−98	55

Source: National Hockey League
Rules for classification: 1) Fewer number of games played (GP, only during regular season); 2) Greater number of regulation wins (RW); 3) Greater number of wins in regulation and overtime, excluding shootout wins (ROW); 4) Greater number of total wins, including shootouts (W); 5) Greater number of points earned in head-to-head play; if teams played an uneven number of head-to-head games, the result of the first game on the home ice of the team with the extra home game is discarded; 6) Greater goal differential (GD); 7) Greater number of goals scored (GF)
x – Clinched playoff spot

== Schedule and results ==
=== Preseason ===
The preseason schedule was published on July 27, 2021.

2021 preseason game log: 4–2–0 (home: 2–1–0; road: 2–1–0)

Game	Date	Opponent	Score	OT	Decision	Location	Attendance	Record	Recap
1	September 26	NY Islanders	0–4		Georgiev	Madison Square Garden	10,238	0–1–0	
2	September 28	Boston	3–2		Wall	Madison Square Garden	9,902	1–1–0	
3	October 1	@ New Jersey	1–7		Shesterkin	Prudential Center	10,474	1–2–0	
4	October 2	@ Boston	4–3	OT	Wall	TD Garden	17,850	2–2–0	
5	October 6	New Jersey	6–2		Shesterkin	Madison Square Garden	10,468	3–2–0	
6	October 9	@ NY Islanders	5–4	OT	Georgiev	Webster Bank Arena	—	4–2–0	

=== Regular season ===
The regular season schedule was published on July 22, 2021, with only about a handful of games scheduled in February because NHL players were planning to participate in the 2022 Winter Olympics. However, on December 22, the NHL announced that its players would not participate in the 2022 Winter Olympics due to the ongoing COVID-19 pandemic.

2021–22 game log
October: 6–2–1, 13 points (home: 1–1–1; road: 5–1–0)

Game	Date	Opponent	Score	OT	Decision	Location	Attendance	Record	Points	Recap
1	October 13	@ Washington	1–5		Georgiev	Capital One Arena	18,573	0–1–0	0	
2	October 14	Dallas	2–3	OT	Shesterkin	Madison Square Garden	17,173	0–1–1	1	
3	October 16	@ Montreal	3–1		Shesterkin	Bell Centre	21,105	1–1–1	3	
4	October 18	@ Toronto	2–1	OT	Shesterkin	Scotiabank Arena	18,098	2–1–1	5	
5	October 21	@ Nashville	3–1		Shesterkin	Bridgestone Arena	17,159	3–1–1	7	
6	October 23	@ Ottawa	3–2		Georgiev	Canadian Tire Centre	11,167	4–1–1	9	
7	October 25	Calgary	1–5		Shesterkin	Madison Square Garden	13,590	4–2–1	9	
8	October 29	Columbus	4–0		Shesterkin	Madison Square Garden	14,532	5–2–1	11	
9	October 31	@ Seattle	3–1		Shesterkin	Climate Pledge Arena	17,151	6–2–1	13	

November: 7–2–2, 16 points (home: 4–0–0; road: 3–2–2)

Game	Date	Opponent	Score	OT	Decision	Location	Attendance	Record	Points	Recap
10	November 2	@ Vancouver	2–3	OT	Shesterkin	Rogers Arena	18,257	6–2–2	14	
11	November 5	@ Edmonton	5–6	OT	Georgiev	Rogers Place	17,404	6–2–3	15	
12	November 6	@ Calgary	0–6		Shesterkin	Scotiabank Saddledome	15,879	6–3–3	15	
13	November 8	Florida	4–3		Shesterkin	Madison Square Garden	14,877	7–3–3	17	
14	November 13	@ Columbus	5–3		Shesterkin	Nationwide Arena	15,539	8–3–3	19	
15	November 14	New Jersey	4–3	SO	Georgiev	Madison Square Garden	16,130	9–3–3	21	
16	November 16	Montreal	3–2		Shesterkin	Madison Square Garden	15,255	10–3–3	23	
17	November 18	@ Toronto	1–2		Shesterkin	Scotiabank Arena	19,029	10–4–3	23	
—	November 20	@ Ottawa	–	Postponed due to COVID-19 protocol; moved to February 20						
18	November 21	Buffalo	5–4		Shesterkin	Madison Square Garden	17,256	11–4–3	25	
19	November 24	@ NY Islanders	4–1		Shesterkin	UBS Arena	17,255	12–4–3	27	
20	November 26	@ Boston	5–2		Shesterkin	TD Garden	17,850	13–4–3	29	
—	November 28	NY Islanders	–	Postponed due to COVID-19 protocol; moved to March 17						

December: 7–4–1, 15 points (home: 3–2–1; road: 4–2–0)

Game	Date	Opponent	Score	OT	Decision	Location	Attendance	Record	Points	Recap
21	December 1	Philadelphia	4–1		Shesterkin	Madison Square Garden	15,687	14–4–3	31	
22	December 3	San Jose	1–0		Shesterkin	Madison Square Garden	16,726	15–4–3	33	
23	December 4	Chicago	3–2		Georgiev	Madison Square Garden	17,046	16–4–3	35	
24	December 7	@ Chicago	6–2		Georgiev	United Center	17,207	17–4–3	37	
25	December 8	Colorado	3–7		Huska	Madison Square Garden	16,714	17–5–3	37	
26	December 10	@ Buffalo	2–1		Georgiev	KeyBank Center	9,703	18–5–3	39	
27	December 12	Nashville	0–1		Georgiev	Madison Square Garden	16,177	18–6–3	39	
28	December 14	@ Colorado	2–4		Georgiev	Ball Arena	17,198	18–7–3	39	
29	December 15	@ Arizona	3–2		Kinkaid	Gila River Arena	11,380	19–7–3	41	
30	December 17	Vegas	2–3	SO	Georgiev	Madison Square Garden	17,400	19–7–4	42	
—	December 22	Montreal	–	Postponed due to COVID-19 protocol; moved to April 27						
—	December 27	Detroit	–	Postponed due to COVID-19 protocol; moved to February 17						
31	December 29	@ Florida	3–4		Shesterkin	FLA Live Arena	15,857	19–8–4	42	
32	December 31	@ Tampa Bay	4–3	SO	Shesterkin	Amalie Arena	19,092	20–8–4	44	

January: 9–5–0, 18 points (home: 6–1–0; road: 3–4–0)

Game	Date	Opponent	Score	OT	Decision	Location	Attendance	Record	Points	Recap
33	January 2	Tampa Bay	4–0		Shesterkin	Madison Square Garden	16,885	21–8–4	46	
34	January 3	Edmonton	4–1		Georgiev	Madison Square Garden	16,979	22–8–4	48	
35	January 6	@ Vegas	1–5		Georgiev	T-Mobile Arena	18,117	22–9–4	48	
36	January 8	@ Anaheim	4–1		Georgiev	Honda Center	15,146	23–9–4	50	
37	January 10	@ Los Angeles	1–3		Georgiev	Crypto.com Arena	13,558	23–10–4	50	
38	January 13	@ San Jose	3–0		Shesterkin	SAP Center	10,919	24–10–4	52	
39	January 15	@ Philadelphia	3–2		Shesterkin	Wells Fargo Center	18,293	25–10–4	54	
40	January 19	Toronto	6–3		Shesterkin	Madison Square Garden	16,624	26–10–4	56	
41	January 21	@ Carolina	3–6		Georgiev	PNC Arena	16,118	26–11–4	56	
42	January 22	Arizona	7–3		Shesterkin	Madison Square Garden	17,006	27–11–4	58	
43	January 24	Los Angeles	3–2	SO	Shesterkin	Madison Square Garden	15,666	28–11–4	60	
44	January 27	@ Columbus	3–5		Georgiev	Nationwide Arena	14,878	28–12–4	60	
45	January 28	Minnesota	2–3		Shesterkin	Madison Square Garden	18,006	28–13–4	60	
46	January 30	Seattle	3–2		Shesterkin	Madison Square Garden	18,006	29–13–4	62	

February: 4–2–1, 9 points (home: 3–1–1; road: 1–1–0)

Game	Date	Opponent	Score	OT	Decision	Location	Attendance	Record	Points	Recap
47	February 1	Florida	5–2		Shesterkin	Madison Square Garden	15,942	30–13–4	64	
48	February 15	Boston	2–1	SO	Shesterkin	Madison Square Garden	15,403	31–13–4	66	
49	February 17	Detroit	2–3	SO	Shesterkin	Madison Square Garden	16,461	31–13–5	67	
50	February 20	@ Ottawa	2–1		Shesterkin	Canadian Tire Centre	5,181	32–13–5	69	
51	February 24	Washington	4–1		Shesterkin	Madison Square Garden	18,006	33–13–5	71	
52	February 26	@ Pittsburgh	0–1		Shesterkin	PPG Paints Arena	18,413	33–14–5	71	
53	February 27	Vancouver	2–5		Georgiev	Madison Square Garden	16,483	33–15–5	71	

March: 11–4–0, 22 points (home: 5–1–0; road: 6–3–0)

Game	Date	Opponent	Score	OT	Decision	Location	Attendance	Record	Points	Recap
54	March 2	St. Louis	5–3		Shesterkin	Madison Square Garden	16,870	34–15–5	73	
55	March 4	New Jersey	3–1		Shesterkin	Madison Square Garden	18,006	35–15–5	75	
56	March 6	@ Winnipeg	4–1		Shesterkin	Canada Life Centre	12,867	36–15–5	77	
57	March 8	@ Minnesota	2–5		Georgiev	Xcel Energy Center	18,356	36–16–5	77	
58	March 10	@ St. Louis	2–6		Shesterkin	Enterprise Center	18,096	36–17–5	77	
59	March 12	@ Dallas	7–4		Shesterkin	American Airlines Center	18,532	37–17–5	79	
60	March 15	Anaheim	4–3	OT	Georgiev	Madison Square Garden	18,006	38–17–5	81	
61	March 17	NY Islanders	1–2		Shesterkin	Madison Square Garden	18,006	38–18–5	81	
62	March 19	@ Tampa Bay	2–1		Shesterkin	Amalie Arena	19,092	39–18–5	83	
63	March 20	@ Carolina	2–0		Georgiev	PNC Arena	18,680	40–18–5	85	
64	March 22	@ New Jersey	4–7		Shesterkin	Prudential Center	16,514	40–19–5	85	
65	March 25	Pittsburgh	5–1		Shesterkin	Madison Square Garden	18,006	41–19–5	87	
66	March 27	Buffalo	5–4	OT	Georgiev	Madison Square Garden	18,006	42–19–5	89	
67	March 29	@ Pittsburgh	3–2		Shesterkin	PPG Paints Arena	18,011	43–19–5	91	
68	March 30	@ Detroit	5–4	OT	Georgiev	Little Caesars Arena	16,375	44–19–5	93	

April: 8–5–1, 17 points (home: 5–4–1; road: 3–1–0)

Game	Date	Opponent	Score	OT	Decision	Location	Attendance	Record	Points	Recap
69	April 1	NY Islanders	0–3		Shesterkin	Madison Square Garden	17,325	44–20–5	93	
70	April 3	Philadelphia	3–4	SO	Shesterkin	Madison Square Garden	16,005	44–20–6	94	
71	April 5	@ New Jersey	3–1		Georgiev	Prudential Center	15,020	45–20–6	96	
72	April 7	Pittsburgh	3–0		Shesterkin	Madison Square Garden	16,694	46–20–6	98	
73	April 9	Ottawa	5–1		Shesterkin	Madison Square Garden	18,006	47–20–6	100	
74	April 12	Carolina	2–4		Shesterkin	Madison Square Garden	18,006	47–21–6	100	
75	April 13	@ Philadelphia	4–0		Georgiev	Wells Fargo Center	15,967	48–21–6	102	
76	April 16	Detroit	4–0		Shesterkin	Madison Square Garden	18,006	49–21–6	104	
77	April 19	Winnipeg	3–0		Shesterkin	Madison Square Garden	18,006	50–21–6	106	
78	April 21	@ NY Islanders	6–3		Georgiev	UBS Arena	17,255	51–21–6	108	
79	April 23	@ Boston	1–3		Shesterkin	TD Garden	17,850	51–22–6	108	
80	April 26	Carolina	3–4		Shesterkin	Madison Square Garden	17,358	51–23–6	108	
81	April 27	Montreal	3–4		Georgiev	Madison Square Garden	16,845	51–24–6	108	
82	April 29	Washington	3–2		Georgiev	Madison Square Garden	17,230	52–24–6	110	

Win (2 points) Loss (0 points) Overtime/shootout loss (1 point)

=== Playoffs ===
The Rangers faced the Pittsburgh Penguins in the first round, and defeated them in seven games. In the second round, the Rangers faced the Carolina Hurricanes, and defeated them in seven games. In the conference finals, the Rangers faced the Tampa Bay Lightning, and lost in six games.

2022 Stanley Cup playoffs
Eastern Conference first round vs. (M3) Pittsburgh Penguins: New York won 4–3

Game	Date	Opponent	Score	OT	Decision	Location	Attendance	Series	Recap
1	May 3	Pittsburgh	3–4	3OT	Shesterkin	Madison Square Garden	18,006	0–1	
2	May 5	Pittsburgh	5–2		Shesterkin	Madison Square Garden	18,006	1–1	
3	May 7	@ Pittsburgh	4–7		Georgiev	PPG Paints Arena	18,385	1–2	
4	May 9	@ Pittsburgh	2–7		Shesterkin	PPG Paints Arena	18,392	1–3	
5	May 11	Pittsburgh	5–3		Shesterkin	Madison Square Garden	18,006	2–3	
6	May 13	@ Pittsburgh	5–3		Shesterkin	PPG Paints Arena	18,342	3–3	
7	May 15	Pittsburgh	4–3	OT	Shesterkin	Madison Square Garden	18,006	4–3	

Eastern Conference second round vs. (M1) Carolina Hurricanes: New York won 4–3

Game	Date	Opponent	Score	OT	Decision	Location	Attendance	Series	Recap
1	May 18	@ Carolina	1–2	OT	Shesterkin	PNC Arena	18,705	0–1	
2	May 20	@ Carolina	0–2		Shesterkin	PNC Arena	19,332	0–2	
3	May 22	Carolina	3–1		Shesterkin	Madison Square Garden	18,006	1–2	
4	May 24	Carolina	4–1		Shesterkin	Madison Square Garden	18,006	2–2	
5	May 26	@ Carolina	1–3		Shesterkin	PNC Arena	18,786	2–3	
6	May 28	Carolina	5–2		Shesterkin	Madison Square Garden	18,006	3–3	
7	May 30	@ Carolina	6–2		Shesterkin	PNC Arena	18,922	4–3	

Eastern Conference finals vs. (A3) Tampa Bay Lightning: Tampa Bay won 4–2

Game	Date	Opponent	Score	OT	Decision	Location	Attendance	Series	Recap
1	June 1	Tampa Bay	6–2		Shesterkin	Madison Square Garden	18,006	1–0	
2	June 3	Tampa Bay	3–2		Shesterkin	Madison Square Garden	18,006	2–0	
3	June 5	@ Tampa Bay	2–3		Shesterkin	Amalie Arena	19,092	2–1	
4	June 7	@ Tampa Bay	1–4		Shesterkin	Amalie Arena	19,092	2–2	
5	June 9	Tampa Bay	1–3		Shesterkin	Madison Square Garden	18,006	2–3	
6	June 11	@ Tampa Bay	1–2		Shesterkin	Amalie Arena	19,092	2–4	

Win Loss

== Player statistics ==
As of June 12, 2022

=== Skaters ===
Regular season
Player	GP	G	A	Pts	+/−	PIM
Artemi Panarin	75	22	74	96	+21	18
Mika Zibanejad	81	29	52	81	+30	12
Chris Kreider	81	52	25	77	+19	24
Adam Fox	78	11	63	74	+18	26
Ryan Strome	74	21	33	54	+15	69
Jacob Trouba	81	11	28	39	+25	88
Barclay Goodrow	79	13	20	33	+13	69
Alexis Lafrenière	79	19	12	31	+2	37
Filip Chytil	67	8	14	22	–1	14
K'Andre Miller	82	7	13	20	+23	24
Andrew Copp^{†}	16	8	10	18	+13	8
Kaapo Kakko	43	7	11	18	+9	10
Dryden Hunt	76	6	11	17	–10	52
Ryan Lindgren	78	4	11	15	+18	48
Frank Vatrano^{†}	22	8	5	13	+6	6
Ryan Reaves	69	5	8	13	–13	43
Kevin Rooney	61	6	6	12	–1	18
Braden Schneider	43	2	9	11	+5	9
Julien Gauthier	49	3	4	7	–9	8
Patrik Nemeth	63	2	5	7	–9	28
Greg McKegg	43	2	3	5	–11	6
Nils Lundkvist	25	1	3	4	+4	0
Samuel Blais	14	0	4	4	+3	17
Justin Braun^{†}	8	1	1	2	–1	0
Jonny Brodzinski	22	1	1	2	+1	10
Zac Jones	12	0	2	2	–7	0
Jarred Tinordi	7	1	0	1	–5	7
Libor Hájek	17	0	1	1	–10	8
Morgan Barron^{‡}	13	0	1	1	–1	4
Tyler Motte^{†}	9	0	0	0	–1	0
Tim Gettinger	8	0	0	0	0	0
Anthony Greco	1	0	0	0	0	0

Playoffs
Player	GP	G	A	Pts	+/−	PIM
Mika Zibanejad	20	10	14	24	0	4
Adam Fox	20	5	18	23	0	2
Chris Kreider	20	10	6	16	–1	14
Artemi Panarin	20	6	10	16	–5	8
Andrew Copp	20	6	8	14	–2	2
Frank Vatrano	20	5	8	13	–1	13
Filip Chytil	20	7	2	9	–2	4
Alexis Lafrenière	20	2	7	9	–3	11
Ryan Strome	19	2	7	9	0	10
K'Andre Miller	20	2	5	7	–5	10
Kaapo Kakko	19	2	3	5	+1	2
Ryan Lindgren	17	2	3	5	+8	10
Jacob Trouba	20	1	4	5	0	25
Braden Schneider	20	0	3	3	–3	6
Tyler Motte	15	2	0	2	–1	4
Kevin Rooney	15	0	2	2	0	10
Barclay Goodrow	9	0	1	1	–1	6
Justin Braun	19	0	1	1	0	6
Dryden Hunt	3	0	0	0	–2	0
Jonny Brodzinski	1	0	0	0	0	2
Patrik Nemeth	5	0	0	0	–4	8
Ryan Reaves	18	0	0	0	–1	12

=== Goaltenders ===
Regular season
Player	GP	GS	TOI	W	L	OT	GA	GAA	SA	SV%	SO	G	A	PIM
Igor Shesterkin	53	52	3,070:32	36	13	4	106	2.07	1,622	.935	6	0	1	2
Alexandar Georgiev	33	28	1,746:06	15	10	2	85	2.92	832	.898	2	0	0	0
Keith Kinkaid	1	1	60:00	1	0	0	2	2.00	31	.935	0	0	0	0
Adam Húska	1	1	59:42	0	1	0	7	7.04	39	.821	0	0	0	0

Playoffs
Player	GP	GS	TOI	W	L	GA	GAA	SA	SV%	SO	G	A	PIM
Igor Shesterkin	20	20	1,181:34	10	9	51	2.59	720	.929	0	0	3	2
Alexandar Georgiev	2	0	58:57	0	1	2	2.04	31	.935	0	0	0	0

- ^{†} Denotes player spent time with another team before joining the Rangers. Stats reflect time with the Rangers only.
- ^{‡} Denotes player was traded mid-season. Stats reflect time with the Rangers only.
- Bold/italics denotes franchise record.

== Awards and honors ==
=== Awards ===
Regular season
Player	Award	Date
Chris Kreider	Steven McDonald Extra Effort Award	April 26, 2022
Chris Kreider	Mr. Ranger Award	April 27, 2022
Igor Shesterkin	Vezina Trophy	June 21, 2022

=== Milestones ===
Regular season
Player	Milestone	Reached
Nils Lundkvist	1st NHL career point	October 29, 2021
Ryan Reaves	700th NHL career game	November 21, 2021
Artemi Panarin	500th NHL career point	December 7, 2021
Adam Húska	1st NHL career game	December 8, 2021
Nils Lundkvist	1st NHL career goal	December 8, 2021
Chris Kreider	600th game as a Ranger	December 12, 2021
Braden Schneider	1st NHL career game 1st NHL career goal	January 13, 2022
Chris Kreider	200th NHL career goal	January 13, 2022
Braden Schneider	1st NHL career assist	January 27, 2022
Gerard Gallant	300th NHL coaching career win	February 1, 2022
Chris Kreider	400th NHL career point	March 15, 2022
Mika Zibanejad	500th NHL career point	March 25, 2022
Artemi Panarin	500th NHL career game	April 7, 2022
Frank Vatrano	100th NHL career goal	April 16, 2022
Adam Fox	200th NHL career game	April 21, 2022
Igor Shesterkin	1st NHL career playoff win	May 5, 2022
Kaapo Kakko	1st NHL career playoff goal	May 7, 2022
Alexis Lafrenière	1st NHL career playoff assist	May 7, 2022
Alexis Lafrenière	1st NHL career playoff goal	May 9, 2022
Filip Chytil	1st NHL career playoff goal	May 11, 2022

=== Records ===
Regular season
Player	Record	Reached
Chris Kreider	60th NHL career power play goal (2nd most power play goals in Rangers history, passing Andy Bathgate)	October 16, 2021
Chris Kreider	25th power play goal in a single season (most in Rangers history); 10th game-winning goal (franchise record)	April 5, 2022
Chris Kreider	50th goal in a single season (fourth Ranger to score 50-plus goals in franchise history)	April 11, 2022

== Transactions ==
The Rangers have been involved in the following transactions during the 2021–22 season.

=== Trades ===
Date	Details		Ref
July 17, 2021	To Tampa Bay Lightning 7th-round pick in 2022	To New York Rangers Barclay Goodrow	
July 17, 2021	To Vegas Golden Knights Brett Howden	To New York Rangers Nick DeSimone; WPG's 4th-round pick in 2022	
July 23, 2021	To St. Louis Blues Pavel Buchnevich	To New York Rangers Samuel Blais; 2nd-round pick in 2022	
July 24, 2021	To Washington Capitals 3rd-round pick in 2021; 6th round pick in 2021	To New York Rangers ARI's 3rd-round pick in 2021	
July 29, 2021	To Vegas Golden Knights 3rd-round pick in 2022	To New York Rangers Ryan Reaves	
March 16, 2022	To Florida Panthers 4th-round pick in 2022	To New York Rangers Frank Vatrano	
March 21, 2022	To Philadelphia Flyers 3rd-round pick in 2023	To New York Rangers Justin Braun	
March 21, 2022	To San Jose Sharks Anthony Bitetto	To New York Rangers Nick Merkley	
March 21, 2022	To Vancouver Canucks 4th-round pick in 2023	To New York Rangers Tyler Motte	
March 21, 2022	To Winnipeg Jets Morgan Barron; 5th-round pick in 2023; Conditional 2nd-round pick in 2022; Conditional 2nd-round pick in 2022	To New York Rangers Andrew Copp; 6th-round pick in 2023	
March 28, 2022	To Carolina Hurricanes Tarmo Reunanen	To New York Rangers Maxim Letunov	

=== Free agents ===
Date	Player	Team	Contract term	Ref
July 28, 2021	Nick DeSimone	to Calgary Flames	1-year	
July 28, 2021	Phillip Di Giuseppe	to Vancouver Canucks	1-year	
July 28, 2021	Dryden Hunt	from Arizona Coyotes	2-year	
July 28, 2021	Greg McKegg	from Boston Bruins	1-year	
July 28, 2021	Patrik Nemeth	from Colorado Avalanche	3-year	
July 28, 2021	Darren Raddysh	to Tampa Bay Lightning	1-year	
July 28, 2021	Jarred Tinordi	from Boston Bruins	2-year	
July 29, 2021	Brendan Smith	to Carolina Hurricanes	1-year	
August 20, 2021	Patrick Newell	to Stjernen Hockey (Eliteserien)	1-year	
September 25, 2021	Gabriel Fontaine	to Colorado Eagles (AHL)	1-year	
October 10, 2021	Jack Johnson	to Colorado Avalanche	1-year	
March 20, 2022	Brandon Scanlin	from Omaha Mavericks (NCHC)	2-year	
April 1, 2022	Bobby Trivigno	from UMass Minutemen (HE)	2-year	
June 13, 2022	Gustav Rydahl	from Färjestad BK (SHL)	1-year	
June 27, 2022	Anthony Greco	to Frölunda HC (SHL)	1-year	

=== Waivers ===
Date	Player	Team	Ref
October 3, 2021	Mason Geertsen	to New Jersey Devils	

=== Contract terminations ===
Date	Player	Via	Ref
July 24, 2021	Tony DeAngelo	Buyout	

=== Signings ===
Date	Player	Contract term	Ref
July 9, 2021	Brett Howden	1-year	
July 16, 2021	Julien Gauthier	1-year	
July 22, 2021	Barclay Goodrow	6-year	
July 29, 2021	Filip Chytil	2-year	
July 31, 2021	Ryan Reaves	1-year	
August 6, 2021	Tim Gettinger	1-year	
August 6, 2021	Adam Húska	1-year	
August 6, 2021	Ty Ronning	1-year	
August 9, 2021	Igor Shesterkin	4-year	
August 12, 2021	Brennan Othmann	3-year	
September 7, 2021	Libor Hájek	1-year	
October 10, 2021	Mika Zibanejad	8-year	
November 1, 2021	Adam Fox	7-year	
November 3, 2021	Matt Rempe	3-year	
December 23, 2021	Dylan Garand	3-year	
February 28, 2022	Jonny Brodzinski	2-year	
May 16, 2022	Adam Edström	3-year	
May 16, 2022	Ryder Korczak	3-year	
May 16, 2022	Olof Lindbom	2-year	
June 13, 2022	Vitali Kravtsov	1-year	
June 17, 2022	Samuel Blais	1-year	
July 5, 2022	Julien Gauthier	1-year	

== Draft picks ==
Below are the New York Rangers' selections at the 2021 NHL entry draft, which was held on July 23 and 24, 2021, in a remote format, with teams convening via videoconferencing, and Commissioner Gary Bettman announcing selections from the NHL Network studios in Secaucus, New Jersey.

Round	#	Player	Pos	Nationality	College/junior/club team
1	16	Brennan Othmann	LW	Canada	EHC Olten (SL)
3	65^{1}	Jayden Grubbe	C	Canada	Red Deer Rebels (WHL)
3	75^{2}	Ryder Korczak	C	Canada	Moose Jaw Warriors (WHL)
4	104^{3}	Brody Lamb	RW	United States	Green Bay Gamblers (USHL)
4	106^{4}	Kalle Väisänen	LW	Finland	HC TPS U20 (U20 SM-sarja)
4	112	Talyn Boyko	G	Canada	Tri-City Americans (WHL)
5	144	Jaroslav Chmelař	RW	Czech Republic	Jokerit U20 (U20 SM-sarja)
7	208	Hank Kempf	D	United States	Muskegon Lumberjacks (USHL)

1. The Buffalo Sabres' third-round pick went to the New York Rangers as the result of a trade on July 1, 2019, that sent Jimmy Vesey to Buffalo in exchange for this pick.
2. The Arizona Coyotes' third-round pick went to the New York Rangers as the result of a trade on July 24, 2021, that sent a third and sixth-round picks both in 2021 (80th and 176th overall) to the Washington Capitals in exchange for this pick.
3. The Los Angeles Kings' fourth-round pick went to the New York Rangers as the result of a trade on March 27, 2021, that sent Brendan Lemieux to Los Angeles in exchange for this pick.
4. The Ottawa Senators' fourth-round pick went to the New York Rangers as the result of a trade on October 7, 2019, that sent Vladislav Namestnikov to Ottawa in exchange for Nick Ebert and this pick.
