= 2021–22 Montreal Canadiens season =

Season of play of professional ice hockey team

2021–22 Montreal Canadiens
- Division: 8th Atlantic
- Conference: 16th Eastern
- 2021–22 record: 22–49–11
- Home record: 11–26–4
- Road record: 11–23–7
- Goals for: 221
- Goals against: 319

Team information
- General manager: Marc Bergevin (Oct. 13 – Nov. 28); Kent Hughes (Jan. 18 – Apr. 29)
- Coach: Dominique Ducharme (Oct. 13 – Feb. 9); Martin St. Louis (interim, Feb. 9 – Apr. 29)
- Captain: Shea Weber
- Alternate captains: Paul Byron; Ben Chiarot (Oct. 13 – Mar. 16); Brendan Gallagher; Jeff Petry; Nick Suzuki; Tyler Toffoli (Oct. 13 – Feb. 14)
- Arena: Bell Centre
- Average attendance: 17,170
- Minor league affiliates: Laval Rocket (AHL); Trois-Rivières Lions (ECHL)

Team leaders
- Goals: Cole Caufield (23)
- Assists: Nick Suzuki (40)
- Points: Nick Suzuki (61)
- Penalty minutes: Michael Pezzetta (81)
- Plus/minus: Jordan Harris; Sami Niku (+3)
- Wins: Jake Allen (9)
- Goals against average: Andrew Hammond (2.40)

The 2021–22 Montreal Canadiens season was the 113th for the club that was established on December 4, 1909, and their 105th season as a franchise in the National Hockey League (NHL).

The Canadiens were unable to replicate their success from the prior season that saw them reach the Stanley Cup Final, whereas on March 25, 2022, they became the first team to be eliminated from playoff contention for the first time since the 2018–19 season following the Washington Capitals' 4–3 shootout victory over the Buffalo Sabres.

Ultimately, the Canadiens finished last in the league for the first time since the 1939–40 season and the first time in the NHL's expansion era, in what was one of the worst seasons in the team's history. Collectively, they set team records for most regulation losses (49), most goals against (319), fewest wins (22), and fewest points (55), while its .335 point percentage was third-worst in franchise history, after only both the 1925–26 (.319) and 1939–40 (.260) campaigns. As a result of this, Montreal won the draft lottery to select first overall in the NHL entry draft for the first time in 42 years. The Canadiens also became the first team since the 2002–03 Carolina Hurricanes to finish in last place in the NHL a year after making the Stanley Cup Final. With a total of 720 man-games lost, the team likewise set an NHL record for most injuries in a season, which they would subsequently break the following season.

== Standings ==
=== Divisional standings ===
Atlantic Division
Pos	Team	GP	W	L	OTL	RW	GF	GA	GD	Pts
1	p – Florida Panthers	82	58	18	6	42	340	246	+94	122
2	x – Toronto Maple Leafs	82	54	21	7	45	315	253	+62	115
3	x – Tampa Bay Lightning	82	51	23	8	39	287	233	+54	110
4	x – Boston Bruins	82	51	26	5	40	255	220	+35	107
5	Buffalo Sabres	82	32	39	11	25	232	290	−58	75
6	Detroit Red Wings	82	32	40	10	21	230	312	−82	74
7	Ottawa Senators	82	33	42	7	26	227	266	−39	73
8	Montreal Canadiens	82	22	49	11	16	221	319	−98	55

Source: National Hockey League
Rules for classification: 1) Fewer number of games played (GP, only during regular season); 2) Greater number of regulation wins (RW); 3) Greater number of wins in regulation and overtime, excluding shootout wins (ROW); 4) Greater number of total wins, including shootouts (W); 5) Greater number of points earned in head-to-head play; if teams played an uneven number of head-to-head games, the result of the first game on the home ice of the team with the extra home game is discarded; 6) Greater goal differential (GD); 7) Greater number of goals scored (GF)
p – Clinched Presidents' Trophy; x – Clinched playoff spot

=== Conference standings ===
Eastern Conference Wild Card
Pos	Div	Team	GP	W	L	OTL	RW	GF	GA	GD	Pts
1	AT	x – Boston Bruins	82	51	26	5	40	255	220	+35	107
2	ME	x – Washington Capitals	82	44	26	12	35	275	245	+30	100
3	ME	New York Islanders	82	37	35	10	34	231	237	−6	84
4	ME	Columbus Blue Jackets	82	37	38	7	26	262	300	−38	81
5	AT	Buffalo Sabres	82	32	39	11	25	232	290	−58	75
6	AT	Detroit Red Wings	82	32	40	10	21	230	312	−82	74
7	AT	Ottawa Senators	82	33	42	7	26	227	266	−39	73
8	ME	New Jersey Devils	82	27	46	9	19	248	307	−59	63
9	ME	Philadelphia Flyers	82	25	46	11	20	211	298	−87	61
10	AT	Montreal Canadiens	82	22	49	11	16	221	319	−98	55

Source: National Hockey League
Rules for classification: 1) Fewer number of games played (GP, only during regular season); 2) Greater number of regulation wins (RW); 3) Greater number of wins in regulation and overtime, excluding shootout wins (ROW); 4) Greater number of total wins, including shootouts (W); 5) Greater number of points earned in head-to-head play; if teams played an uneven number of head-to-head games, the result of the first game on the home ice of the team with the extra home game is discarded; 6) Greater goal differential (GD); 7) Greater number of goals scored (GF)
x – Clinched playoff spot

== Schedule and results ==
=== Preseason ===
2021 preseason game log: 2–3–1 (home: 2–0–1; road: 0–3–0)
#	Date	Visitor	Score	Home	OT	Decision	Attendance	Record	Recap
1	September 25	Montreal	4–1	Toronto		Primeau	—	0–1–0
2	September 27	Toronto	2–5	Montreal		Allen	7,500	1–1–0
3	October 1	Montreal	2–7	Ottawa		Allen	—	1–2–0
4	October 2	Ottawa	1–2	Montreal		Primeau	7,500	2–2–0
5	October 5	Montreal	2–6	Toronto		Montembeault	—	2–3–0
6	October 7	Ottawa	5–4	Montreal	SO	Allen	7,500	2–3–1

=== Regular season ===
The regular season schedule was released on July 22, 2021.

2021–22 game log

October: 2–8–0 (home: 1–3–0; road: 1–5–0)
#	Date	Visitor	Score	Home	OT	Decision	Attendance	Record	Pts	Recap
1	October 13	Montreal	1–2	Toronto		Allen	18,493	0–1–0	0
2	October 14	Montreal	1–5	Buffalo		Montembeault	8,467	0–2–0	0
3	October 16	NY Rangers	3–1	Montreal		Allen	21,105	0–3–0	0
4	October 19	San Jose	5–0	Montreal		Allen	16,095	0–4–0	0
5	October 21	Carolina	4–1	Montreal		Allen	19,174	0–5–0	0
6	October 23	Detroit	1–6	Montreal		Allen	19,706	1–5–0	2
7	October 26	Montreal	1–5	Seattle		Allen	17,151	1–6–0	2
8	October 28	Montreal	4–0	San Jose		Allen	11,463	2–6–0	4
9	October 30	Montreal	2–5	Los Angeles		Allen	12,785	2–7–0	4
10	October 31	Montreal	2–4	Anaheim		Montembeault	11,652	2–8–0	4

November: 4–8–2 (home: 3–4–1; road: 1–4–1)
#	Date	Visitor	Score	Home	OT	Decision	Attendance	Record	Pts	Recap
11	November 2	Detroit	0–3	Montreal		Allen	19,547	3–8–0	6
12	November 4	NY Islanders	6–2	Montreal		Allen	19,924	3–9–0	6
13	November 6	Vegas	5–2	Montreal		Allen	20,156	3–10–0	6
14	November 9	Los Angeles	3–2	Montreal	OT	Allen	20,042	3–10–1	7
15	November 11	Calgary	2–4	Montreal		Allen	20,399	4–10–1	9
16	November 13	Montreal	2–3	Detroit	OT	Montembeault	18,076	4–10–2	10
17	November 14	Montreal	2–5	Boston		Montembeault	17,850	4–11–2	10
18	November 16	Montreal	2–3	NY Rangers		Primeau	15,255	4–12–2	10
19	November 18	Pittsburgh	6–0	Montreal		Primeau	20,712	4–13–2	10
20	November 20	Nashville	3–6	Montreal		Montembeault	20,522	5–13–2	12
21	November 24	Montreal	3–6	Washington		Allen	18,573	5–14–2	12
22	November 26	Montreal	1–4	Buffalo		Montembeault	9,958	5–15–2	12
23	November 27	Montreal	6–3	Pittsburgh		Allen	17,985	6–15–2	14
24	November 29	Vancouver	2–1	Montreal		Allen	20,478	6–16–2	14

December: 1–6–2 (home: 1–3–0; road: 0–3–2)
#	Date	Visitor	Score	Home	OT	Decision	Attendance	Record	Pts	Recap
25	December 2	Colorado	4–1	Montreal		Allen	20,092	6–17–2	14
26	December 4	Montreal	3–4	Nashville	OT	Allen	17,159	6–17–3	15
27	December 7	Tampa Bay	3–2	Montreal		Allen	19,976	6–18–3	15
28	December 9	Chicago	2–0	Montreal		Allen	20,447	6–19–3	15
29	December 11	Montreal	1–4	St. Louis		Allen	16,829	6–20–3	15
30	December 14	Montreal	2–5	Pittsburgh		Allen	17,005	6–21–3	15
31	December 16	Philadelphia	2–3	Montreal	SO	Primeau	0	7–21–3	17
—	December 18	Boston	–	Montreal	Postponed due to COVID-19.
—	December 20	Montreal	–	NY Islanders	Postponed due to COVID-19.
—	December 22	Montreal	–	NY Rangers	Postponed due to COVID-19.
—	December 23	Montreal	–	New Jersey	Postponed due to COVID-19.
32	December 28	Montreal	4–5	Tampa Bay	OT	Montembeault	19,092	7–21–4	18
33	December 30	Montreal	0–4	Carolina		Montembeault	17,722	7–22–4	18

January: 1–7–3 (home: 0–3–0; road: 1–4–3)
#	Date	Visitor	Score	Home	OT	Decision	Attendance	Record	Pts	Recap
34	January 1	Montreal	2–5	Florida		Montembeault	13,584	7–23–4	18
—	January 4	Washington	–	Montreal	Postponed due to COVID-19.
—	January 6	Toronto	–	Montreal	Postponed due to COVID-19.
—	January 8	Buffalo	–	Montreal	Postponed due to COVID-19.
—	January 10	Columbus	–	Montreal	Postponed due to COVID-19.
35	January 12	Montreal	1–5	Boston		Allen	17,850	7–24–4	18
36	January 13	Montreal	2–3	Chicago	OT	Montembeault	17,472	7–24–5	19
—	January 15	New Jersey	–	Montreal	Postponed due to COVID-19.
37	January 17	Montreal	2–5	Arizona		Primeau	9,495	7–25–5	19
38	January 18	Montreal	5–3	Dallas		Montembeault	17,679	8–25–5	21
39	January 20	Montreal	3–4	Vegas	OT	Montembeault	18,121	8–25–6	22
40	January 22	Montreal	2–3	Colorado	OT	Primeau	17,646	8–25–7	23
41	January 24	Montreal	2–8	Minnesota		Primeau	18,104	8–26–7	23
42	January 27	Anaheim	5–4	Montreal		Montembeault	0	8–27–7	23
43	January 29	Edmonton	7–2	Montreal		Montembeault	0	8–28–7	23
44	January 30	Columbus	6–3	Montreal		Primeau	0	8–29–7	23

February: 5–4–0 (home: 3–4–0; road: 2–0–0)
#	Date	Visitor	Score	Home	OT	Decision	Attendance	Record	Pts	Recap
45	February 8	New Jersey	7–1	Montreal		Primeau	500	8–30–7	23
46	February 10	Washington	5–2	Montreal		Primeau	500	8–31–7	23
47	February 12	Columbus	2–1	Montreal		Montembeault	500	8–32–7	23
48	February 13	Buffalo	5–3	Montreal		Montembeault	500	8–33–7	23
49	February 17	St. Louis	2–3	Montreal	OT	Montembeault	500	9–33–7	25
50	February 20	Montreal	3–2	NY Islanders	SO	Hammond	17,255	10–33–7	27
51	February 21	Toronto	2–5	Montreal		Montembeault	10,552	11–33–7	29
52	February 23	Buffalo	0–4	Montreal		Montembeault	10,552	12–33–7	31
53	February 26	Montreal	2–1	Ottawa		Hammond	9,958	13–33–7	33

March: 5–6–4 (home: 2–2–3; road: 3–4–1)
#	Date	Visitor	Score	Home	OT	Decision	Attendance	Record	Pts	Recap
54	March 1	Montreal	4–8	Winnipeg		Montembeault	13,816	13–34–7	33
55	March 3	Montreal	5–4	Calgary	OT	Hammond	16,288	14–34–7	35
56	March 5	Montreal	5–2	Edmonton		Montembeault	18,258	15–34–7	37
57	March 9	Montreal	3–5	Vancouver		Montembeault	18,645	15–35–7	37
58	March 12	Seattle	4–3	Montreal	SO	Montembeault	20,608	15–35–8	38
59	March 13	Montreal	4–3	Philadelphia	OT	Montembeault	15,451	16–35–8	40
60	March 15	Arizona	6–3	Montreal		Montembeault	20,532	16–36–8	40
61	March 17	Dallas	4–3	Montreal	OT	Allen	20,714	16–36–9	41
62	March 19	Ottawa	1–5	Montreal		Allen	21,105	17–36–9	43
63	March 21	Boston	3–2	Montreal	OT	Allen	20,922	17–36–10	44
64	March 24	Florida	4–3	Montreal		Allen	20,788	17–37–10	44
65	March 26	Toronto	2–4	Montreal		Allen	21,105	18–37–10	46
66	March 27	Montreal	2–3	New Jersey	SO	Montembeault	12,080	18–37–11	47
67	March 29	Montreal	4–7	Florida		Allen	15,587	18–38–11	47
68	March 31	Montreal	0–4	Carolina		Allen	15,289	18–39–11	47

April: 4–10–0 (home: 1–7–0; road: 3–3–0)
#	Date	Visitor	Score	Home	OT	Decision	Attendance	Record	Pts	Recap
69	April 2	Montreal	5–4	Tampa Bay	SO	Allen	19,092	19–39–11	49
70	April 5	Ottawa	6–3	Montreal		Allen	20,566	19–40–11	49
71	April 7	Montreal	7–4	New Jersey		Allen	10,435	20–40–11	51
72	April 9	Montreal	2–3	Toronto		Montembeault	19,113	20–41–11	51
73	April 11	Winnipeg	4–2	Montreal		Montembeault	20,728	20–42–11	51
74	April 13	Montreal	1–5	Columbus		Montembeault	16,708	20–43–11	51
75	April 15	NY Islanders	3–0	Montreal		Price	21,105	20–44–11	51
76	April 16	Washington	8–4	Montreal		Montembeault	21,105	20–45–11	51
77	April 19	Minnesota	2–0	Montreal		Price	20,725	20–46–11	51
78	April 21	Philadelphia	6–3	Montreal		Price	21,105	20–47–11	51
79	April 23	Montreal	4–6	Ottawa		Price	19,410	20–48–11	51
80	April 24	Boston	5–3	Montreal		Montembeault	21,105	20–49–11	51
81	April 27	Montreal	4–3	NY Rangers		Montembeault	16,845	21–49–11	53
82	April 29	Florida	2–10	Montreal		Price	21,105	22–49–11	55

Legend: Win (2 points) Loss (0 points) Overtime/shootout loss (1 point)

== Player statistics ==
Final stats

=== Skaters ===
Regular season
Player	GP	G	A	Pts	+/−	PIM
Nick Suzuki	82	21	40	61	−29	30
Cole Caufield	67	23	20	43	−24	10
Mike Hoffman	67	15	20	35	−24	32
Christian Dvorak	56	11	22	33	−19	24
Josh Anderson	69	19	13	32	−25	65
Artturi Lehkonen^{‡}	58	13	16	29	0	14
Jake Evans	72	13	16	29	−5	22
Jeff Petry	68	6	21	27	−11	36
Chris Wideman	64	4	23	27	−25	67
Tyler Toffoli^{‡}	37	9	17	26	−8	4
Rem Pitlick^{†}	46	9	17	26	−9	12
Brendan Gallagher	56	7	17	24	−7	69
Jonathan Drouin	34	6	14	20	−9	23
Ben Chiarot^{‡}	54	7	11	18	−18	42
Ryan Poehling	57	9	8	17	−21	6
David Savard	62	3	14	17	−22	36
Joel Armia	60	6	8	14	−15	14
Brett Kulak^{‡}	56	3	10	13	−10	33
Alexander Romanov	79	3	10	13	−9	53
Laurent Dauphin	38	4	8	12	−10	25
Michael Pezzetta	51	5	6	11	−7	81
Mathieu Perreault	25	4	5	9	+2	4
Paul Byron	27	4	3	7	−8	2
Joel Edmundson	24	3	3	6	−1	35
Corey Schueneman	24	2	4	6	−5	8
Sami Niku	13	0	6	6	+3	2
Kale Clague^{†}	25	2	3	5	−8	18
Jesse Ylonen	14	2	3	5	+2	2
Tyler Pitlick^{†}	14	1	2	3	−6	4
Justin Barron^{†}	5	1	1	2	−2	0
Cedric Paquette	24	0	2	2	−6	25
Lukas Vejdemo	6	1	0	1	−3	0
Jordan Harris	10	1	0	1	+3	8
Rafael Harvey-Pinard	4	1	0	1	−2	0
William Lagesson^{†}	3	0	1	1	+2	0
Adam Brooks^{‡}	4	0	1	1	−1	0
Mattias Norlinder	6	0	1	1	+2	2
Alex Belzile	11	0	0	0	0	4
Brandon Baddock^{‡}	1	0	0	0	0	0
Cameron Hillis	1	0	0	0	0	0

=== Goaltenders ===
Regular season
Player	GP	GS	TOI	W	L	OT	GA	GAA	SA	SV%	SO	G	A	PIM
Jake Allen	35	35	1,947:40	9	20	4	107	3.30	1,123	.905	2	0	0	2
Sam Montembeault	38	30	1,942:49	8	18	6	122	3.77	1,124	.891	1	0	0	0
Andrew Hammond^{‡}	4	3	200:10	3	0	0	8	2.40	100	.920	0	0	0	0
Carey Price	5	5	297:30	1	4	0	18	3.63	148	.878	0	0	0	0
Cayden Primeau	12	9	519:13	1	7	1	40	4.62	302	.868	0	0	0	0
Michael McNiven^{‡}	1	0	20:00	0	0	0	3	9.00	7	.571	0	0	0	0

^{†}Denotes player spent time with another team before joining the Canadiens. Stats reflect time with the Canadiens only.
^{‡}Denotes player was traded mid-season. Stats reflect time with the Canadiens only.
Bold/italics denotes franchise record.

== Suspensions/fines ==
Player	Explanation	Length	Salary	Date issued	Ref
Cedric Paquette	Boarding Ducks forward Trevor Zegras	2 games	$9,500.00	November 1, 2021	
Brendan Gallagher	Roughing Rangers forward Barclay Goodrow	N/A	$2,500.00	November 17, 2021	
Chris Wideman	Head-butting Bruins forward Erik Haula	1 game	$3,750.00	January 13, 2022	
Jonathan Drouin	Cross-checking Stars forward Tyler Seguin	N/A	$5,000.00	January 19, 2022	
Michael Pezzetta	Illegal check to the head of Capitals forward T.J. Oshie	2 games	$7,500.00	April 18, 2022	

== Awards and honours ==
=== Awards ===
Regular season
Player	Award	Awarded	Ref
Nick Suzuki	NHL All-Star Game selection	January 13, 2022	
Cole Caufield	NHL Rookie of the Month	April 1, 2022	
Carey Price	Bill Masterton Memorial Trophy	June 1, 2022	

=== Milestones ===
Regular season
Player	Milestone	Reached	Ref
Jonathan Drouin	400th career NHL game	October 26, 2021	
Michael Pezzetta	1st career NHL game	November 2, 2021	
Mike Hoffman	400th career NHL point	November 6, 2021	
Michael Pezzetta	1st career NHL assist 1st career NHL point	November 13, 2021	
Michael Pezzetta	1st career NHL goal	November 14, 2021	
Brendan Gallagher	600th career NHL game	November 18, 2021	
Mattias Norlinder	1st career NHL game	November 18, 2021	
Mattias Norlinder	1st career NHL assist 1st career NHL point	November 27, 2021	
Tyler Toffoli	600th career NHL game	November 27, 2021	
Chris Wideman	200th career NHL game	December 4, 2021	
Nick Suzuki	100th career NHL point	December 7, 2021	
Jesse Ylonen	1st career NHL goal 1st career NHL point	December 14, 2021	
Kale Clague	1st career NHL goal	December 28, 2021	
Rafael Harvey-Pinard	1st career NHL game 1st career NHL goal 1st career NHL point	December 28, 2021	
Corey Schueneman	1st career NHL game 1st career NHL assist 1st career NHL point	December 28, 2021	
Brandon Baddock	1st career NHL game	December 30, 2021	
Cameron Hillis	1st career NHL game	January 1, 2022	
Jesse Ylonen	1st career NHL assist	January 1, 2022	
Ben Chiarot	100th career NHL point	January 13, 2022	
Michael McNiven	1st career NHL game	January 24, 2022	
Jeff Petry	300th career NHL point	January 24, 2022	
Brett Kulak	300th career NHL game	February 10, 2022	
Jake Evans	100th career NHL game	February 13, 2022	
Paul Byron	500th career NHL game	February 17, 2022	
Alexander Romanov	100th career NHL game	February 17, 2022	
Samuel Montembeault	1st career NHL shutout	February 23, 2022	
Josh Anderson	1st career NHL hat-trick	March 1, 2022	
Mike Hoffman	200th career NHL goal	March 5, 2022	
Mathieu Perreault	700th career NHL game	March 5, 2022	
Corey Schueneman	1st career NHL goal	March 17, 2022	
Joel Edmundson	400th career NHL game	March 27, 2022	
Justin Barron	1st career NHL assist 1st career NHL point	March 29, 2022	
Jordan Harris	1st career NHL game	April 2, 2022	
Justin Barron	1st career NHL goal	April 5, 2022	
Mike Hoffman	600th career NHL game	April 5, 2022	
Josh Anderson	100th career NHL goal	April 11, 2022	
Nick Suzuki	200th career NHL game	April 11, 2022	
Jeff Petry	800th career NHL game	April 23, 2022	
Christian Dvorak	100th career NHL assist	April 27, 2022	
Cole Caufield	1st career NHL hat-trick	April 29, 2022	
Jordan Harris	1st career NHL goal 1st career NHL point	April 29, 2022	

== Transactions ==
The Canadiens have been involved in the following transactions during the 2021–22 season.

=== Trades ===
Date	Details		Ref
July 24, 2021	To Anaheim Ducks CHI's 3rd-round pick in 2021^{1}	To Montreal Canadiens 3rd-round pick in 2022	
July 24, 2021	To Tampa Bay Lightning VGK's 4th-round pick in 2021^{2}	To Montreal Canadiens 4th-round pick in 2022	
July 24, 2021	To Minnesota Wild 4th-round pick in 2021	To Montreal Canadiens 5th-round pick in 2021; 7th-round pick in 2021	
July 24, 2021	To Arizona Coyotes 7th-round pick in 2021	To Montreal Canadiens STL's 7th-round pick in 2022^{3}	
September 4, 2021	To Arizona Coyotes Conditional 1st-round pick in 2022^{4} 2nd-round pick in 2024	To Montreal Canadiens Christian Dvorak	
February 12, 2022	To Minnesota Wild Brandon Baddock	To Montreal Canadiens Andrew Hammond	
February 14, 2022	To Calgary Flames Tyler Toffoli	To Montreal Canadiens Tyler Pitlick; Emil Heineman; Conditional 1st-round pick in 2022^{5} 5th-round pick in 2023	
March 2, 2022	To Calgary Flames Michael McNiven	To Montreal Canadiens Future considerations	
March 16, 2022	To Florida Panthers Ben Chiarot^{6}	To Montreal Canadiens Conditional 1st-round pick in 2023^{7} NYR's 4th-round pick in 2022^{8} Ty Smilanic	
March 21, 2022	To Edmonton Oilers Brett Kulak^{9}	To Montreal Canadiens William Lagesson; Conditional 2nd-round pick in 2022^{10} 7th-round pick in 2024	
March 21, 2022	To Colorado Avalanche Artturi Lehkonen^{11}	To Montreal Canadiens Justin Barron; 2nd-round pick in 2024	
March 21, 2022	To New Jersey Devils Andrew Hammond	To Montreal Canadiens Nate Schnarr	
June 16, 2022	To Vegas Golden Knights Shea Weber	To Montreal Canadiens Evgenii Dadonov	

==== Notes ====
1. The Chicago Blackhawks' third-round pick went to the Anaheim Ducks as the result of a trade on July 24, 2021, that sent a third-round pick in 2022 to Montreal in exchange for this pick.
  Montreal previously acquired this pick as the result of a trade on June 30, 2019, that sent Andrew Shaw and a seventh-round pick in 2021 to Chicago in exchange for second and seventh-round picks both in 2020 and this pick.
2. The Vegas Golden Knights' fourth-round pick went to the Tampa Bay Lightning as the result of a trade on July 24, 2021, that sent a fourth-round pick in 2022 to Montreal in exchange for this pick.
  Montreal previously acquired this pick as the result of a trade on February 24, 2020, that sent Nick Cousins to Vegas in exchange for this pick.
3. The St. Louis Blues' seventh-round pick went to the Montreal Canadiens as the result of a trade on July 24, 2021, that sent a seventh-round pick in 2021 to Arizona in exchange for this pick.
  Arizona previously acquired this pick as the result of a trade on July 22, 2021, that sent future considerations to Philadelphia in exchange for Shayne Gostisbehere, a second-round pick in 2022, and this pick.
  Philadelphia previously acquired this pick as the result of a trade on April 12, 2021, that sent Erik Gustafsson to Montreal in exchange for this pick.
  Montreal previously acquired this pick as the result of a trade on September 2, 2020, that sent Washington's third-round pick and Chicago's seventh-round pick both in 2020 to St. Louis in exchange for Jake Allen and this pick.
4. The Arizona Coyotes will receive the better of Montreal's own first-round pick in 2022 and Carolina's first-round pick in 2022 (previously acquired by Montreal). However, in the event that either or both of Montreal's own first-round pick and/or Carolina's first-round pick are top 10 picks (after the final draft order has been established in accordance with the results of the 2022 NHL draft lottery), then Arizona will receive the worse of Montreal's own pick and Carolina's pick.
5. If the Calgary Flames' first-round pick in 2022 is a top 10 pick, Montreal will instead receive their 2023 first-round pick along with a 2024 fourth-round pick – was not converted when the Flames qualified for the 2022 Stanley Cup playoffs on April 16, 2022.
6. Montreal will retain 50% of Chiarot's salary for the remainder of the 2021–22 season.
7. Montreal will receive a first-round pick in 2023 if Florida's first-round pick in 2022 is outside of the top 10 – was converted when the Panthers qualified for the 2022 Stanley Cup playoffs on April 3, 2022.
8. The New York Rangers' fourth-round pick went to the Montreal Canadiens as the result of a trade on March 16, 2022, that sent Ben Chiarot to Florida in exchange for Ty Smilanic, a conditional first-round pick in 2023 and this pick being conditional at the time of the trade). The condition – Montreal will receive the lowest of the Rangers' or Jets' fourth-round pick in 2022. – was converted when the Rangers clinched a spot in the 2022 Stanley Cup playoffs on April 9, 2022, and when the Jets were eliminated from the playoffs on April 20, 2022.
  Florida previously acquired this pick as the result of a trade on March 16, 2022, that sent Frank Vatrano to New York in exchange for this conditional pick.
9. Montreal will retain 50% of Kulak's salary for the remainder of the 2021–22 season.
10. If the Edmonton Oilers reach the 2022 Stanley Cup Final, the pick will instead become a second-round selection in 2023 – was not converted following the Oilers' playoff elimination versus the Colorado Avalanche in the Western Conference final on June 6, 2022.
11. Montreal will retain 50% of Lehkonen's salary for the remainder of the 2021–22 season.

=== Players acquired ===
Date	Player	Former team (League)	Term	Via	Ref
July 28, 2021	Louie Belpedio	Minnesota Wild	1-year	Free agency	
July 28, 2021	Jean-Sebastien Dea	Buffalo Sabres	1-year	Free agency	
July 28, 2021	Mike Hoffman	St. Louis Blues	3-year	Free agency	
July 28, 2021	Cedric Paquette	Carolina Hurricanes	1-year	Free agency	
July 28, 2021	David Savard	Tampa Bay Lightning	4-year	Free agency	
July 28, 2021	Chris Wideman	Nizhny Novgorod Torpedo (KHL)	1-year	Free agency	
July 29, 2021	Mathieu Perreault	Winnipeg Jets	1-year	Free agency	
September 24, 2021	Sami Niku	Winnipeg Jets	1-year	Free agency	
October 2, 2021	Sam Montembeault	Florida Panthers		Waivers	
October 4, 2021	Arber Xhekaj	Kitchener Rangers (OHL)	3-year	Free agency	
October 11, 2021	Adam Brooks	Toronto Maple Leafs		Waivers	
December 4, 2021	Kale Clague	Los Angeles Kings		Waivers	
January 12, 2022	Rem Pitlick	Minnesota Wild		Waivers	
March 31, 2022	Lucas Condotta	University of Massachusetts Lowell (HE)	1-year	Free agency	
June 14, 2022	Otto Leskinen	Tappara (Liiga)	1-year	Free-agency	

=== Players lost ===
Date	Player	New team (League)	Term	Via	Ref
July 13, 2021	Jordan Weal	Ak Bars Kazan (KHL)	2-year	Free agency	
July 16, 2021	Jake Lucchini	Laval Rocket (AHL)	1-year	Free agency	
July 21, 2021	Cale Fleury	Seattle Kraken		Expansion draft	
July 28, 2021	Phillip Danault	Los Angeles Kings	6-year	Free agency	
July 29, 2021	Charlie Lindgren	St. Louis Blues	1-year	Free agency	
July 29, 2021	Jon Merrill	Minnesota Wild	1-year	Free agency	
July 29, 2021	Corey Perry	Tampa Bay Lightning	2-year	Free agency	
August 5, 2021	Tomas Tatar	New Jersey Devils	2-year	Free agency	
August 25, 2021	Gustav Olofsson	Seattle Kraken	1-year	Free agency	
September 4, 2021	Jesperi Kotkaniemi	Carolina Hurricanes	1-year	Free agency^{1}	
October 11, 2021	Erik Gustafsson	Chicago Blackhawks	1-year	Free agency	
October 15, 2021	Michael Frolik	Lausanne HC (NL)	2-year	Free agency	
November 17, 2021	Adam Brooks	Vegas Golden Knights		Waivers	
December 9, 2021	Arsen Khisamutdinov			Mutual termination	
December 18, 2021	Arsen Khisamutdinov	Dinamo Riga (KHL)	2-year	Free agency	
March 4, 2022	Joseph Blandisi	Toronto Marlies (AHL)	1-year	Free agency^{2}	

==== Notes ====
1. As compensation for not matching the Offer Sheet made by the Carolina Hurricanes to restricted free agent Jesperi Kotkaniemi, Montreal receives a 1st-round and a 3rd-round pick in the 2022 NHL entry draft from Carolina.
2. Blandisi originally signed a Professional Tryout contract with the Toronto Marlies on December 14, 2021, prior to inking an AHL contract thereafter.

=== Signings ===
Date	Player	Term	Contract type	Ref
July 15, 2021	Alex Belzile	1-year	Re-signing	
July 27, 2021	Joel Armia	4-year	Re-signing	
July 31, 2021	Artturi Lehkonen	1-year	Re-signing	
August 5, 2021	Michael Pezzetta	1-year	Re-signing	
August 6, 2021	Michael McNiven	1-year	Re-signing	
August 27, 2021	Ryan Poehling	2-year	Re-signing	
October 3, 2021	Jake Evans	3-year	Re-signing	
October 12, 2021	Nick Suzuki	8-year	Re-signing	
March 26, 2022	Jordan Harris	2-year	Entry-level	
March 30, 2022	Joshua Roy	3-year	Entry-level	
April 4, 2022	Emil Heineman	3-year	Entry-level	
May 4, 2022	Riley Kidney	3-year	Entry-level	
June 6, 2022	Chris Wideman	2-year	Re-signing	

== Draft picks ==
Below are the Montreal Canadiens' selections at the 2021 NHL entry draft, which was held on July 23 to 24, 2021. It was held virtually via video conference call from the NHL Network studio in Secaucus, New Jersey.

Round	#	Player	Pos.	Nationality	Team (League)
1	31	Logan Mailloux	D	Canada	SK Lejon (Hockeyettan)
2	63	Riley Kidney	C	Canada	Acadie-Bathurst Titan (QMJHL)
2	64^{1}	Oliver Kapanen	C	Finland	KalPa U20 (U20 SM-sarja)
3	87^{2}	Dmitri Kostenko	D	Russia	Lada Togliatti (VHL)
4	113^{3}	William Trudeau	D	Canada	Charlottetown Islanders (QMJHL)
5	142^{4}	Daniil Sobolev	D	Russia	Windsor Spitfires (OHL)
5	150^{5}	Joshua Roy	RW	Canada	Sherbrooke Phoenix (QMJHL)
6	191	Xavier Simoneau	C	Canada	Drummondville Voltigeurs (QMJHL)
7	214^{6}	Joe Vrbetic	G	Canada	North Bay Battalion (OHL)

=== Notes ===
1. The Tampa Bay Lightning's second-round pick went to the Montreal Canadiens as the result of a trade on October 7, 2020, that sent St. Louis' second-round pick in 2020 (57th overall) to Tampa Bay in exchange for a fourth-round pick in 2020 (124th overall) and this pick.
2. The Washington Capitals' third-round pick went to the Montreal Canadiens as the result of a trade on October 7, 2020, that sent Anaheim's fourth-round pick in 2020 (98th overall) to San Jose in exchange for this pick.
  San Jose previously acquired this pick as the result of a trade on February 18, 2020, that sent Brenden Dillon to Washington in exchange for Colorado's second-round pick in 2020 and this pick (being conditional at the time of the trade). The condition – San Jose will receive a third-round pick in 2021 if Washington does not win the Stanley Cup in 2020 – was converted when Washington was eliminated from the 2020 Stanley Cup playoffs on August 20, 2020.
3. The St. Louis Blues' fourth-round pick went to the Montreal Canadiens as the result of a trade on February 18, 2020, that sent Marco Scandella to St. Louis in exchange for a second-round pick in 2020 and this pick (being conditional at the time of the trade). The condition – Montreal will receive a fourth-round pick in 2021 if Scandella re-signs with the Blues for the 2020–21 NHL season by October 7, 2020 – was converted when Scandella re-signed with the Blues on April 16, 2020.
4. The Philadelphia Flyers' fifth-round pick went to the Montreal Canadiens as the result of a trade on February 24, 2020, that sent Nate Thompson to Philadelphia in exchange for this pick.
5. The Minnesota Wild's fifth-round pick went to the Montreal Canadiens as the result of a trade on July 24, 2021, that sent a fourth-round pick in 2021 (127th overall) to Minnesota in exchange for a seventh-round pick in 2021 (214th overall) and this pick.
6. The Minnesota Wild's seventh-round pick went to the Montreal Canadiens as the result of a trade on July 24, 2021, that sent a fourth-round pick in 2021 (127th overall) to Minnesota in exchange for a fifth-round pick in 2021 (150th overall) and this pick.
