= Sean Day =

Ice hockey player (born 1998)

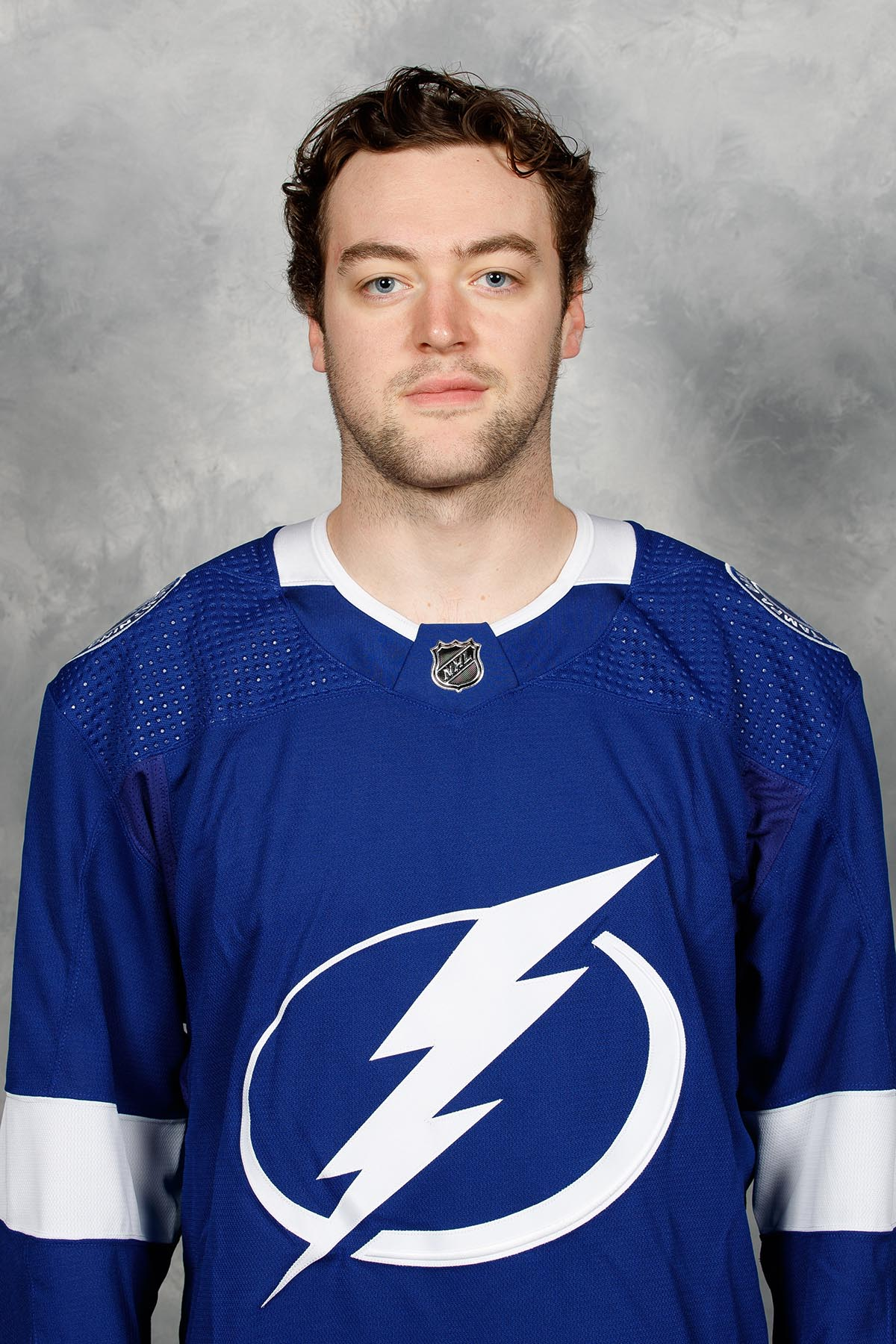
- Day with the Tampa Bay Lightning in 2021
- Born: January 9, 1998 (age 28) Leuven, Belgium
- Height: 6 ft 3 in (191 cm)
- Weight: 231 lb (105 kg; 16 st 7 lb)
- Position: Defence
- Shoots: Left
- AHL team Former teams: Free agent Tampa Bay Lightning; HV71
- NHL draft: 81st overall, 2016; New York Rangers
- Playing career: 2018–present

Sean Day (born January 9, 1998) is a professional ice hockey defenceman who is currently an unrestricted free agent. He formerly played for the Tampa Bay Lightning of the National Hockey League (NHL) and HV71 in the Swedish Hockey League (SHL). Day was selected by the Mississauga Steelheads fourth overall in the 2013 OHL Priority Selection. Day was drafted 81st overall in the third round of the 2016 NHL entry draft by the New York Rangers. After several years playing in the minor leagues, Day made his NHL debut in 2021 with the Lightning.

== Early life ==
Day was born in Leuven, Belgium, but grew up in Rochester, Michigan. Keith Day, Sean's father, was an executive with a global chemical company, which has taken him all over the world. His family relocated periodically before he was transferred to the Detroit area. Day holds dual Canadian and American citizenship. Due to his family moving around the world, Day first skated on a mall rink in Singapore.

== Playing career ==
Day's application for exceptional player status was granted by Hockey Canada on March 21, 2013, making him eligible to be drafted a year early in the 2013 OHL Priority Selection and to play major junior hockey as a 15-year-old. Day was the fourth player to be granted the exemption, after John Tavares in 2005, Aaron Ekblad in 2011 and Connor McDavid in 2012. He was drafted fourth overall in the OHL priority draft by the Mississauga Steelheads.

In the 2016–17 season, on October 19, 2016, Day was acquired by Memorial Cup hosts, the Windsor Spitfires in exchange for draft picks. Gearing towards the playoffs with the Spitfires, on March 8, 2017, Day agreed to a three-year, entry-level contract with the New York Rangers. He would win the Memorial Cup with the Spitfires later that season.

In the 2017–18 season, on January 1, 2018, Day along with Gabriel Vilardi were traded by the Spitfires to the Kingston Frontenacs in exchange for Cody Morgan and six draft picks.

Day began his professional career in 2018 with the Rangers AHL affiliate Hartford Wolf Pack. After a slow start in the first six games he was demoted to the Maine Mariners. He played well enough in 19 games with the Mariners to earn a berth in the ECHL All-Star game, but was promoted back to Hartford before the game.

Day began the following season in the AHL with the Hartford Wolf Pack, but after posting a disappointing 4 points in 16 games, he was demoted to the Maine Mariners, where he would remain until the season was cancelled due to the COVID-19 pandemic.

On May 30, 2020, Day was placed on unconditional waivers by the Rangers for the purposes of contract termination. He cleared waivers the following day and the remaining year of his contract was terminated. As a free agent on July 17, 2020, Day was signed to a one-year, two-way contract with the Tampa Bay Lightning.

He made his NHL debut with the Lightning on December 28, 2021, against the Montreal Canadiens.

=== Sweden ===
On September 10, 2024, Day signed a two-year contract with HV71 in the Swedish Hockey League (SHL). In the 2024–25 season, Day as a regular on the blueline made 45 appearances in his first season abroad, contributing with 2 goals and 11 points. Day mutually parted ways with HV71 after the conclusion of the season on July 27, 2025.

=== Return to North America ===
As a free agent, Day later secured a one-year contract in a return to the AHL with the Bridgeport Islanders, the primary affiliate to the New York Islanders, on August 6, 2025.

== Career statistics ==
=== Regular season and playoffs ===
			Regular season					Playoffs
Season	Team	League	GP	G	A	Pts	PIM	GP	G	A	Pts	PIM
2013–14	Mississauga Steelheads	OHL	60	6	10	16	34	4	0	1	1	4
2014–15	Mississauga Steelheads	OHL	61	10	26	36	62	—	—	—	—	—
2015–16	Mississauga Steelheads	OHL	57	6	16	22	27	7	1	2	3	4
2016–17	Mississauga Steelheads	OHL	5	3	2	5	4	—	—	—	—	—
2016–17	Windsor Spitfires	OHL	58	12	20	32	20	7	0	5	5	0
2017–18	Windsor Spitfires	OHL	27	4	17	21	8	—	—	—	—	—
2017–18	Kingston Frontenacs	OHL	23	1	25	26	4	16	4	10	14	0
2018–19	Hartford Wolf Pack	AHL	46	3	11	14	8	—	—	—	—	—
2018–19	Maine Mariners	ECHL	19	4	11	15	6	—	—	—	—	—
2019–20	Hartford Wolf Pack	AHL	16	1	3	4	13	—	—	—	—	—
2019–20	Maine Mariners	ECHL	36	5	15	20	27	—	—	—	—	—
2020–21	Syracuse Crunch	AHL	29	3	12	15	38	—	—	—	—	—
2021–22	Syracuse Crunch	AHL	69	8	32	40	31	—	—	—	—	—
2021–22	Tampa Bay Lightning	NHL	2	0	0	0	0	—	—	—	—	—
2022–23	Syracuse Crunch	AHL	63	0	14	14	41	1	0	0	0	0
2023–24	Syracuse Crunch	AHL	54	5	18	23	16	8	1	2	3	2
2024–25	HV71	SHL	45	2	9	11	6	—	—	—	—	—
2025–26	Bridgeport Islanders	AHL	61	3	14	17	4	1	0	0	0	0
NHL totals			2	0	0	0	0	—	—	—	—	—

=== International ===
Year	Team	Event	GP	G	A	Pts	PIM
2014	Canada Ontario	U17	5	0	3	3	2
2014	Canada Red	U17	5	1	3	4	4
Junior totals			10	1	6	7	6

== Awards and honours ==
Honours	Year
OHL Exceptional Player Status	2012–13
