= Fredrik Claesson =

Swedish ice hockey player (born 1992)

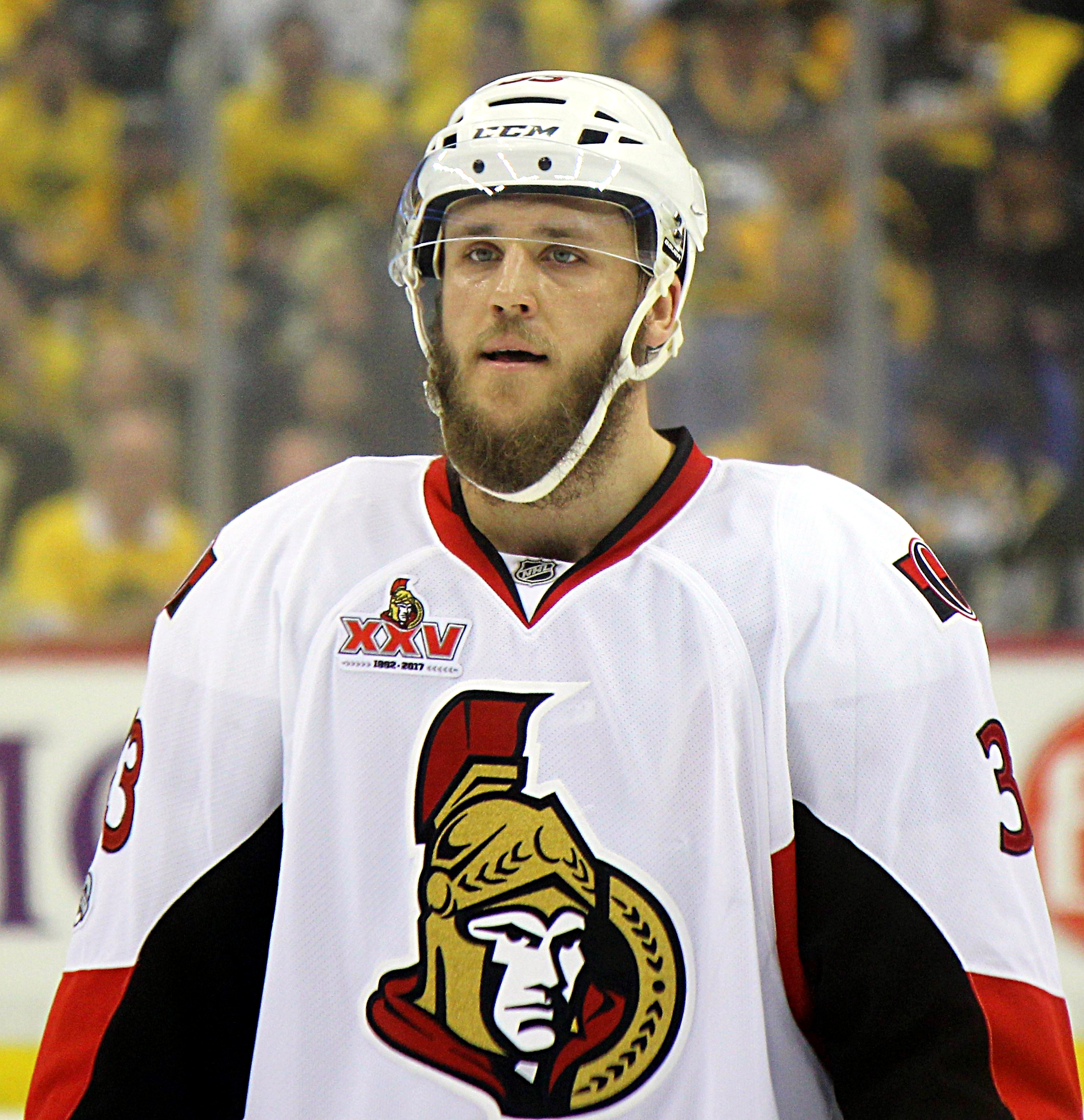
- Claesson with the Ottawa Senators in 2017
- Born: 24 November 1992 (age 33) Stockholm, Sweden
- Height: 6 ft 0 in (183 cm)
- Weight: 198 lb (90 kg; 14 st 2 lb)
- Position: Defence
- Shoots: Left
- team Former teams: Free agent Djurgårdens IF; Ottawa Senators; New York Rangers; New Jersey Devils; San Jose Sharks; Tampa Bay Lightning; CSKA Moscow; Dynamo Moscow
- NHL draft: 126th overall, 2011; Ottawa Senators
- Playing career: 2010–present

Fredrik Claesson (born 24 November 1992) is a Swedish professional ice hockey defenceman who is currently an unrestricted free agent. He most recently played for HC Dynamo Moscow in the Kontinental Hockey League (KHL). He was drafted by the Ottawa Senators in the fifth round (126th overall) of the 2011 NHL draft.

== Playing career ==
Claesson began playing hockey in Haninge HC, and later moved on to Hammarby IF, to play in Hammarby's youth organization. He also made two appearances in the club's senior team in the Swedish second division league HockeyAllsvenskan, during the 2007–08 season. Claesson moved to Stockholm rival Djurgården for the 2008–09, where he played in Djurgården's J18 and J20 teams. He also represented team Stockholm at the 2008 TV-pucken.

Claesson made his Elitserien debut in the Djurgården's first league game of the season on 16 September 2010 against HV71. He signed a two-year extension with Djurgården in October 2010. He scored his first Elitserien goal on 11 December 2010 away against Modo Hockey.

Claesson signed a three-year entry-level contract with the Ottawa Senators on 10 May 2012. He began the 2012–13 season with the Senators American Hockey League affiliate, the Binghamton Senators. In June 2015, Claesson re-signed with the Senators on a one-year, two-way contract. Claesson made his NHL debut on 30 December 2015 at Ottawa versus the New Jersey Devils. In July 2016 he was re-signed to a one-year contract with the team and in February 2017 that contract was extended for another year.

After the 2017–18 season, his sixth within the Senators organization, Claesson as an impending restricted free agent was surprisingly not tendered a qualifying offer by the club, and was released to explore free agency on 25 June 2018. He later signed a one-year, $700,000 contract with the New York Rangers on 1 July 2018.

On 17 September 2019, Claesson signed a one-year, two-way deal with the Carolina Hurricanes. He began the 2019–20 season, with the Hurricanes AHL affiliate and reigning champions, the Charlotte Checkers. In 47 games from the blueline with the Checkers, Claesson contributed with 3 goals and 19 points. On 24 February 2020, Claesson was dealt by the Hurricanes at the NHL trade deadline, along with Janne Kuokkanen and a conditional 2020 fourth-round pick to the New Jersey Devils in exchange for Sami Vatanen on 24 February 2020.

On 11 January 2021, Claesson signed a one-year, two-way deal with the San Jose Sharks. He was traded to the Tampa Bay Lightning in exchange for Magnus Chrona on 12 April 2021. He featured in two regular season games with the Lightning, remaining on the roster throughout the post-season as the Lightning retained the Stanley Cup.

Following 10 seasons in North America, Claesson opted to leave as a free agent and was signed to a one-year contract with reigning Russian champions, CSKA Moscow of the KHL, on 13 July 2022.

After three seasons with CSKA, Claesson moved to rival club in signing a one-year contract with HC Dynamo Moscow for the 2025–26 season on 16 June 2025.

== Career statistics ==
=== Regular season and playoffs ===
			Regular season					Playoffs
Season	Team	League	GP	G	A	Pts	PIM	GP	G	A	Pts	PIM
2007–08	Hammarby IF	J18	15	1	2	3	29	—	—	—	—	—
2007–08	Hammarby IF	Allsv	2	0	0	0	0	—	—	—	—	—
2008–09	Djurgårdens IF	J18	18	8	6	14	2	—	—	—	—	—
2008–09	Djurgårdens IF	J18 Allsv	10	1	2	3	2	—	—	—	—	—
2008–09	Djurgårdens IF	J20	7	0	0	0	0	—	—	—	—	—
2009–10	Djurgårdens IF	J18 Allsv	3	1	1	2	0	5	0	3	3	6
2009–10	Djurgårdens IF	J20	22	0	4	4	18	—	—	—	—	—
2010–11	Djurgårdens IF	J20	18	2	3	5	6	5	0	1	1	0
2010–11	Djurgårdens IF	SEL	35	2	0	2	6	7	0	1	1	0
2011–12	Djurgårdens IF	SEL	47	1	6	7	8	—	—	—	—	—
2012–13	Binghamton Senators	AHL	70	3	8	11	51	3	0	1	1	2
2013–14	Binghamton Senators	AHL	75	3	26	29	39	4	0	0	0	4
2014–15	Binghamton Senators	AHL	76	4	15	19	42	—	—	—	—	—
2015–16	Binghamton Senators	AHL	55	3	7	10	50	—	—	—	—	—
2015–16	Ottawa Senators	NHL	16	0	2	2	2	—	—	—	—	—
2016–17	Binghamton Senators	AHL	9	0	1	1	2	—	—	—	—	—
2016–17	Ottawa Senators	NHL	33	3	8	11	4	14	0	3	3	4
2017–18	Ottawa Senators	NHL	64	1	6	7	35	—	—	—	—	—
2018–19	New York Rangers	NHL	37	2	4	6	9	—	—	—	—	—
2019–20	Charlotte Checkers	AHL	47	3	16	19	18	—	—	—	—	—
2019–20	New Jersey Devils	NHL	5	1	1	2	0	—	—	—	—	—
2020–21	San Jose Sharks	NHL	4	0	0	0	0	—	—	—	—	—
2020–21	Tampa Bay Lightning	NHL	2	0	0	0	12	—	—	—	—	—
2021–22	Syracuse Crunch	AHL	47	0	14	14	20	5	0	0	0	0
2021–22	Tampa Bay Lightning	NHL	9	0	0	0	0	—	—	—	—	—
2022–23	CSKA Moscow	KHL	60	4	10	14	27	27	1	6	7	8
2023–24	CSKA Moscow	KHL	61	2	8	10	18	5	0	0	0	2
2024–25	CSKA Moscow	KHL	67	1	13	14	27	6	0	1	1	4
2025–26	Dynamo Moscow	KHL	50	1	6	7	12	—	—	—	—	—
NHL totals			170	7	21	28	62	14	0	3	3	4
KHL totals			238	8	37	45	84	38	1	7	8	14

Medal record

Representing Sweden

Ice hockey

World Junior Championships
Gold medal – first place	2012 Calgary	

World U18 Championships
Silver medal – second place	2010 Belarus	

=== International ===
Year	Team	Event	Result	GP	G	A	Pts	PIM
2010	Sweden	U18	2nd place, silver medalist(s)	6	0	1	1	0
2012	Sweden	WJC	1st place, gold medalist(s)	6	0	0	0	0
Junior totals				12	0	1	1	0

== Awards and honours ==
Award	Year
KHL
Gagarin Cup (CSKA Moscow)	2023
