= 2021–22 Edmonton Oilers season =

Season of play of professional ice hockey team

2021–22 Edmonton Oilers
- Division: 2nd Pacific
- Conference: 5th Western
- 2021–22 record: 49–27–6
- Home record: 28–12–1
- Road record: 21–15–5
- Goals for: 290
- Goals against: 252

Team information
- General manager: Ken Holland
- Coach: Dave Tippett (Oct. 13 – Feb. 10); Jay Woodcroft (Feb. 10 – June 6)
- Captain: Connor McDavid
- Alternate captains: Leon Draisaitl; Ryan Nugent-Hopkins; Darnell Nurse
- Arena: Rogers Place
- Average attendance: 14,927
- Minor league affiliates: Bakersfield Condors (AHL); Wichita Thunder (ECHL)

Team leaders
- Goals: Leon Draisaitl (55)
- Assists: Connor McDavid (79)
- Points: Connor McDavid (123)
- Penalty minutes: Zack Kassian (63)
- Plus/minus: Connor McDavid (+28)
- Wins: Mikko Koskinen (27)
- Goals against average: Stuart Skinner (2.62)

The 2021–22 Edmonton Oilers season was the 43rd season for the National Hockey League (NHL) franchise that was established on June 22, 1979, and 50th season overall, including their play in the World Hockey Association (WHA). On April 22, 2022, the Oilers clinched a playoff berth after a 6–3 win against the Colorado Avalanche.

== Standings ==
=== Divisional standings ===
Pacific Division
Pos	Team	GP	W	L	OTL	RW	GF	GA	GD	Pts
1	y – Calgary Flames	82	50	21	11	44	293	208	+85	111
2	x – Edmonton Oilers	82	49	27	6	38	290	252	+38	104
3	x – Los Angeles Kings	82	44	27	11	35	239	236	+3	99
4	Vegas Golden Knights	82	43	31	8	34	266	248	+18	94
5	Vancouver Canucks	82	40	30	12	32	249	236	+13	92
6	San Jose Sharks	82	32	37	13	22	214	264	−50	77
7	Anaheim Ducks	82	31	37	14	22	232	271	−39	76
8	Seattle Kraken	82	27	49	6	23	216	285	−69	60

Source: National Hockey League
Rules for classification: 1) Fewer number of games played (GP, only during regular season); 2) Greater number of regulation wins (RW); 3) Greater number of wins in regulation and overtime, excluding shootout wins (ROW); 4) Greater number of total wins, including shootouts (W); 5) Greater number of points earned in head-to-head play; if teams played an uneven number of head-to-head games, the result of the first game on the home ice of the team with the extra home game is discarded; 6) Greater goal differential (GD); 7) Greater number of goals scored (GF)
x – Clinched playoff spot; y – Clinched division

=== Conference standings ===
Western Conference Wild Card
Pos	Div	Team	GP	W	L	OTL	RW	GF	GA	GD	Pts
1	CE	x – Dallas Stars	82	46	30	6	31	238	246	−8	98
2	CE	x – Nashville Predators	82	45	30	7	35	266	252	+14	97
3	PA	Vegas Golden Knights	82	43	31	8	34	266	248	+18	94
4	PA	Vancouver Canucks	82	40	30	12	32	249	236	+13	92
5	CE	Winnipeg Jets	82	39	32	11	32	252	257	−5	89
6	PA	San Jose Sharks	82	32	37	13	22	214	264	−50	77
7	PA	Anaheim Ducks	82	31	37	14	22	232	271	−39	76
8	CE	Chicago Blackhawks	82	28	42	12	16	219	291	−72	68
9	PA	Seattle Kraken	82	27	49	6	23	216	285	−69	60
10	CE	Arizona Coyotes	82	25	50	7	18	207	313	−106	57

Source: National Hockey League
Rules for classification: 1) Fewer number of games played (GP, only during regular season); 2) Greater number of regulation wins (RW); 3) Greater number of wins in regulation and overtime, excluding shootout wins (ROW); 4) Greater number of total wins, including shootouts (W); 5) Greater number of points earned in head-to-head play; if teams played an uneven number of head-to-head games, the result of the first game on the home ice of the team with the extra home game is discarded; 6) Greater goal differential (GD); 7) Greater number of goals scored (GF)
x – Clinched playoff spot

== Schedule and results ==
=== Preseason ===
The preseason schedule was published on July 20, 2021.

2021 preseason game log: 6–1–1 (home: 4–0–0; road: 2–1–1)
#	Date	Visitor	Score	Home	OT	Decision	Attendance	Record	Recap
1	September 26	Edmonton	4–0	Calgary		Skinner	14,519	1–0–0
2	September 28	Seattle	0–6	Edmonton		Smith	13,627	2–0–0
3	September 29	Edmonton	1–5	Winnipeg		Konovalov	—	2–1–0
4	October 1	Edmonton	1–2	Seattle	OT	Skinner	—	2–1–1
5	October 2	Winnipeg	3–4	Edmonton		Koskinen	15,206	3–1–1
6	October 4	Calgary	3–4	Edmonton		Koskinen	13,566	4–1–1
7	October 7	Vancouver	2–3	Edmonton		Smith	13,742	5–1–1
8	October 9	Edmonton	3–2	Vancouver		Skinner	9,350	6–1–1

=== Regular season ===
The regular season schedule was released on July 22, 2021.

2021–22 game log

October: 6–1–0 (home: 3–1–0; road: 3–0–0)
#	Date	Visitor	Score	Home	OT	Decision	Attendance	Record	Pts	Recap
1	October 13	Vancouver	2–3	Edmonton	SO	Smith	16,034	1–0–0	2
2	October 16	Calgary	2–5	Edmonton		Smith	17,745	2–0–0	4
3	October 19	Anaheim	5–6	Edmonton		Koskinen	14,082	3–0–0	6
4	October 21	Edmonton	5–1	Arizona		Koskinen	9,748	4–0–0	8
5	October 22	Edmonton	5–3	Vegas		Koskinen	17,978	5–0–0	10
6	October 27	Philadelphia	5–3	Edmonton		Koskinen	14,328	5–1–0	10
7	October 30	Edmonton	2–1	Vancouver		Koskinen	18,422	6–1–0	12

November: 9–4–0 (home: 5–0–0; road: 4–4–0)
#	Date	Visitor	Score	Home	OT	Decision	Attendance	Record	Pts	Recap
8	November 1	Seattle	2–5	Edmonton		Koskinen	15,860	7–1–0	14
9	November 3	Nashville	2–5	Edmonton		Koskinen	14,414	8–1–0	16
10	November 5	NY Rangers	5–6	Edmonton	OT	Koskinen	17,404	9–1–0	18
11	November 9	Edmonton	2–4	Detroit		Skinner	16,953	9–2–0	18
12	November 11	Edmonton	5–3	Boston		Koskinen	17,850	10–2–0	20
13	November 12	Edmonton	2–3	Buffalo		Skinner	8,258	10–3–0	20
14	November 14	Edmonton	5–4	St. Louis		Koskinen	18,096	11–3–0	22
15	November 16	Edmonton	2–5	Winnipeg		Koskinen	13,473	11–4–0	22
16	November 18	Winnipeg	1–2	Edmonton	SO	Skinner	15,273	12–4–0	24
17	November 20	Chicago	2–5	Edmonton		Skinner	18,347	13–4–0	26
18	November 23	Edmonton	1–4	Dallas		Skinner	18,532	13–5–0	26
19	November 24	Edmonton	5–3	Arizona		Koskinen	12,845	14–5–0	28
20	November 27	Edmonton	3–2	Vegas		Koskinen	18,381	15–5–0	30

December: 3–7–1 (home: 2–5–0; road: 1–2–1)
#	Date	Visitor	Score	Home	OT	Decision	Attendance	Record	Pts	Recap
21	December 1	Pittsburgh	2–5	Edmonton		Koskinen	17,130	16–5–0	32
22	December 3	Edmonton	3–4	Seattle		Skinner	17,151	16–6–0	32
23	December 5	Los Angeles	5–1	Edmonton		Koskinen	15,658	16–7–0	32
24	December 7	Minnesota	4–1	Edmonton		Koskinen	14,715	16–8–0	32
25	December 9	Boston	3–2	Edmonton		Skinner	16,112	16–9–0	32
26	December 11	Carolina	3–1	Edmonton		Koskinen	18,025	16–10–0	32
27	December 14	Toronto	5–1	Edmonton		Koskinen	18,131	16–11–0	32
28	December 16	Columbus	2–5	Edmonton		Skinner	15,022	17–11–0	34
29	December 18	Edmonton	5–3	Seattle		Skinner	17,151	18–11–0	36
—	December 20	Anaheim	–	Edmonton	Postponed due to COVID-19. Moved to February 17.
—	December 22	Edmonton	–	Los Angeles	Postponed due to COVID-19. Moved to February 15.
—	December 23	Edmonton	–	San Jose	Postponed due to COVID-19. Moved to February 14.
—	December 27	Edmonton	–	Calgary	Postponed due to COVID-19. Moved to March 7.
30	December 29	Edmonton	2–4	St. Louis		Smith	18,096	18–12–0	36
31	December 31	Edmonton	5–6	New Jersey	OT	Smith	13,044	18–12–1	37

January: 4–4–2 (home: 2–2–0; road: 2–2–2)
#	Date	Visitor	Score	Home	OT	Decision	Attendance	Record	Pts	Recap
32	January 1	Edmonton	2–3	NY Islanders	OT	Koskinen	17,255	18–12–2	38
33	January 3	Edmonton	1–4	NY Rangers		Koskinen	16,979	18–13–2	38
34	January 5	Edmonton	2–4	Toronto		Smith	0	18–14–2	38
—	January 8	NY Islanders	–	Edmonton	Postponed due to COVID-19. Moved to February 11.
—	January 10	Ottawa	–	Edmonton	Postponed due to COVID-19. Moved to January 15.
—	January 12	Minnesota	–	Edmonton	Postponed due to COVID-19. Moved to February 20.
—	January 14	Vegas	–	Edmonton	Postponed due to COVID-19. Moved to February 8.
35	January 15	Ottawa	6–4	Edmonton		Skinner	9,150	18–15–2	38
—	January 16	Edmonton	–	Winnipeg	Postponed due to COVID-19. Moved to February 19.
—	January 18	Chicago	–	Edmonton	Postponed due to attendance restrictions. Moved to February 9.
36	January 20	Florida	6–0	Edmonton		Koskinen	9,150	18–16–2	38
37	January 22	Calgary	3–5	Edmonton		Koskinen	9,150	19–16–2	40
38	January 25	Edmonton	3–2	Vancouver	OT	Koskinen	9,396	20–16–2	42
39	January 27	Nashville	2–3	Edmonton	SO	Koskinen	9,150	21–16–2	44
40	January 29	Edmonton	7–2	Montreal		Skinner	0	22–16–2	46
41	January 31	Edmonton	2–3	Ottawa	OT	Koskinen	500	22–16–3	47

February: 7–5–0 (home: 2–3–0; road: 5–2–0)
#	Date	Visitor	Score	Home	OT	Decision	Attendance	Record	Pts	Recap
42	February 2	Edmonton	5–3	Washington		Koskinen	18,573	23–16–3	49
43	February 8	Vegas	4–0	Edmonton		Smith	9,150	23–17–3	49
44	February 9	Chicago	4–1	Edmonton		Smith	9,150	23–18–3	49
45	February 11	NY Islanders	1–3	Edmonton		Smith	9,150	24–18–3	51
46	February 14	Edmonton	3–0	San Jose		Skinner	11,513	25–18–3	53
47	February 15	Edmonton	5–2	Los Angeles		Smith	15,494	26–18–3	55
48	February 17	Anaheim	3–7	Edmonton		Smith	9,150	27–18–3	57
49	February 19	Edmonton	4–2	Winnipeg		Koskinen	12,360	28–18–3	59
50	February 20	Minnesota	7–3	Edmonton		Smith	9,150	28–19–3	59
51	February 23	Edmonton	3–5	Tampa Bay		Smith	19,092	28–20–3	59
52	February 26	Edmonton	4–3	Florida		Koskinen	15,628	29–20–3	61
53	February 27	Edmonton	1–2	Carolina		Smith	18,801	29–21–3	61

March: 9–4–2 (home: 8–1–0; road: 1–3–2)
#	Date	Visitor	Score	Home	OT	Decision	Attendance	Record	Pts	Recap
54	March 1	Edmonton	3–0	Philadelphia		Koskinen	15,114	30–21–3	63
55	March 3	Edmonton	3–4	Chicago	OT	Koskinen	19,688	30–21–4	64
56	March 5	Montreal	5–2	Edmonton		Smith	18,258	30–22–4	64
57	March 7	Edmonton	1–3	Calgary		Koskinen	17,246	30–23–4	64
58	March 9	Washington	3–4	Edmonton	OT	Koskinen	16,368	31–23–4	66
59	March 12	Tampa Bay	1–4	Edmonton		Koskinen	17,528	32–23–4	68
60	March 15	Detroit	5–7	Edmonton		Koskinen	15,311	33–23–4	70
61	March 17	Buffalo	1–6	Edmonton		Smith	15,883	34–23–4	72
62	March 19	New Jersey	3–6	Edmonton		Koskinen	16,950	35–23–4	74
63	March 21	Edmonton	2–3	Colorado	OT	Smith	18,022	35–23–5	75
64	March 22	Edmonton	3–5	Dallas		Koskinen	18,532	35–24–5	75
65	March 24	San Jose	2–5	Edmonton		Smith	16,740	36–24–5	77
66	March 26	Edmonton	5–9	Calgary		Smith	19,289	36–25–5	77
67	March 28	Arizona	1–6	Edmonton		Koskinen	15,237	37–25–5	79
68	March 30	Los Angeles	3–4	Edmonton	SO	Koskinen	16,472	38–25–5	81

April: 11–2–1 (home: 6–0–1; road: 5–2–0)
#	Date	Visitor	Score	Home	OT	Decision	Attendance	Record	Pts	Recap
69	April 1	St. Louis	5–6	Edmonton	OT	Smith	16,310	39–25–5	83
70	April 3	Edmonton	6–1	Anaheim		Smith	13,689	40–25–5	85
71	April 5	Edmonton	2–1	San Jose	OT	Smith	12,046	41–25–5	87
72	April 7	Edmonton	3–2	Los Angeles		Smith	15,149	42–25–5	89
73	April 9	Colorado	2–1	Edmonton	SO	Koskinen	18,347	42–25–6	90
74	April 12	Edmonton	1–5	Minnesota		Koskinen	19,035	42–26–6	90
75	April 14	Edmonton	4–0	Nashville		Smith	17,403	43–26–6	92
76	April 16	Vegas	0–4	Edmonton		Smith	17,757	44–26–6	94
77	April 20	Dallas	2–5	Edmonton		Smith	16,833	45–26–6	96
78	April 22	Colorado	3–6	Edmonton		Smith	18,347	46–26–6	98
79	April 24	Edmonton	2–5	Columbus		Koskinen	18,120	46–27–6	98
80	April 26	Edmonton	5–1	Pittsburgh		Smith	17,804	47–27–6	100
81	April 28	San Jose	4–5	Edmonton	OT	Koskinen	16,692	48–27–6	102
82	April 29	Vancouver	2–3	Edmonton	SO	Koskinen	18,347	49–27–6	104

Legend: Win (2 points) Loss (0 points) Overtime/shootout loss (1 point)

=== Playoffs ===
2022 Stanley Cup playoffs

Western Conference First Round vs. (P3) Los Angeles Kings: Edmonton won 4–3
#	Date	Visitor	Score	Home	OT	Decision	Attendance	Series	Recap
1	May 2	Los Angeles	4–3	Edmonton		Smith	18,347	0–1
2	May 4	Los Angeles	0–6	Edmonton		Smith	18,347	1–1
3	May 6	Edmonton	8–2	Los Angeles		Smith	18,230	2–1
4	May 8	Edmonton	0–4	Los Angeles		Smith	18,230	2–2
5	May 10	Los Angeles	5–4	Edmonton	OT	Smith	18,347	2–3
6	May 12	Edmonton	4–2	Los Angeles		Smith	18,301	3–3
7	May 14	Los Angeles	0–2	Edmonton		Smith	18,347	4–3

Western Conference Second Round vs. (P1) Calgary Flames: Edmonton won 4–1
#	Date	Visitor	Score	Home	OT	Decision	Attendance	Series	Recap
1	May 18	Edmonton	6–9	Calgary		Koskinen	19,289	0–1
2	May 20	Edmonton	5–3	Calgary		Smith	19,289	1–1
3	May 22	Calgary	1–4	Edmonton		Smith	18,347	2–1
4	May 24	Calgary	3–5	Edmonton		Smith	18,347	3–1
5	May 26	Edmonton	5–4	Calgary	OT	Smith	19,289	4–1

Western Conference Finals vs. (C1) Colorado Avalanche: Colorado won 4–0
#	Date	Visitor	Score	Home	OT	Decision	Attendance	Series	Recap
1	May 31	Edmonton	6–8	Colorado		Koskinen	18,044	0–1
2	June 2	Edmonton	0–4	Colorado		Smith	18,107	0–2
3	June 4	Colorado	4–2	Edmonton		Smith	18,347	0–3
4	June 6	Colorado	6–5	Edmonton	OT	Smith	18,347	0–4

Legend: Win Loss

== Player statistics ==
=== Skaters ===
Regular season
Player	GP	G	A	Pts	+/−	PIM
Connor McDavid	80	44	79	123	+28	45
Leon Draisaitl	80	55	55	110	+17	40
Zach Hyman	76	27	27	54	−9	36
Ryan Nugent-Hopkins	63	11	39	50	+3	16
Evan Bouchard	81	12	31	43	+10	28
Kailer Yamamoto	81	20	21	41	−1	40
Tyson Barrie	73	7	34	41	+3	18
Evander Kane	43	22	17	39	+25	60
Jesse Puljujarvi	65	14	22	36	+22	20
Darnell Nurse	71	9	26	35	+18	54
Cody Ceci	78	5	23	28	+8	14
Warren Foegele	82	12	14	26	−9	24
Derek Ryan	75	10	12	22	−4	8
Ryan McLeod	71	9	12	21	−2	12
Duncan Keith	64	1	20	21	+15	22
Zack Kassian	58	6	13	19	+2	63
Devin Shore	49	5	6	11	−4	10
Kris Russell	31	2	7	9	+7	4
Brett Kulak^{†}	18	2	6	8	+6	12
Brendan Perlini	23	4	1	5	−2	6
Colton Sceviour	35	2	3	5	−6	26
Kyle Turris	23	1	3	4	−5	4
Slater Koekkoek	19	0	4	4	+2	16
William Lagesson^{‡}	30	0	4	4	+1	13
Derick Brassard^{†}	15	2	1	3	−2	6
Philip Broberg	23	1	2	3	−8	8
Brad Malone	8	1	1	2	−2	2
Tyler Benson	29	1	1	2	−5	18
Josh Archibald	8	0	1	1	−2	7
Cooper Marody	1	0	1	1	0	0
Markus Niemelainen	20	0	1	1	−5	4
Seth Griffith	1	0	0	0	+1	0
Dmitri Samorukov	1	0	0	0	−2	0

Playoffs
Player	GP	G	A	Pts	+/−	PIM
Connor McDavid	16	10	23	33	+15	10
Leon Draisaitl	16	7	25	32	+4	6
Evander Kane	15	13	4	17	+2	37
Zach Hyman	16	11	5	16	+4	4
Ryan Nugent-Hopkins	16	6	8	14	−3	14
Evan Bouchard	16	3	6	9	−4	4
Kailer Yamamoto	14	2	5	7	−6	10
Cody Ceci	16	1	6	7	+4	12
Darnell Nurse	15	2	4	6	+5	26
Tyson Barrie	16	1	4	5	+2	10
Duncan Keith	16	1	4	5	−4	4
Brett Kulak	16	0	5	5	+7	12
Ryan McLeod	16	3	1	4	−4	8
Zack Kassian	16	2	2	4	−2	12
Jesse Puljujarvi	16	2	1	3	0	2
Derek Ryan	15	1	2	3	−3	4
Warren Foegele	13	0	1	1	−5	2
Josh Archibald	13	0	1	1	−5	4
Dylan Holloway	1	0	0	0	+1	0
Philip Broberg	1	0	0	0	0	0
Brad Malone	2	0	0	0	−1	12
Derick Brassard	1	0	0	0	0	0
Kris Russell	6	0	0	0	0	0

=== Goaltenders ===
Regular season
Player	GP	GS	TOI	W	L	OT	GA	GAA	SA	SV%	SO	G	A	PIM
Mikko Koskinen	45	43	2,628:38	27	12	4	136	3.10	1,397	.903	1	0	0	4
Mike Smith	28	27	1,579:58	16	9	2	74	2.81	874	.915	2	0	1	6
Stuart Skinner	13	12	734:09	6	6	0	32	2.62	367	.913	1	0	0	0

Playoffs
Player	GP	GS	TOI	W	L	GA	GAA	SA	SV%	SO	G	A	PIM
Mike Smith	16	16	872:15	8	6	49	3.37	560	.913	2	0	1	2
Mikko Koskinen	3	0	89:29	0	2	6	4.02	58	.897	0	0	0	0

^{†}Denotes player spent time with another team before joining the Oilers. Stats reflect time with the Oilers only.
^{‡}Denotes player was traded mid-season. Stats reflect time with the Oilers only.

== Awards and honours ==
=== Milestones ===
Regular season
Player	Milestone	Reached
Leon Draisaitl	200th NHL goal	October 19, 2021
Zach Hyman	100th NHL assist	October 19, 2021
Zack Kassian	100th NHL assist	October 21, 2021
Connor McDavid	200th NHL goal	October 21, 2021
Ryan Nugent-Hopkins	300th NHL assist	October 22, 2021
Kris Russell	200th NHL assist	October 22, 2021
Jesse Puljujarvi	200th NHL game	October 27, 2021
Duncan Keith	1,200th NHL game	November 1, 2021
Tyson Barrie	400th NHL point	November 5, 2021
Connor McDavid	600th NHL point	November 14, 2021
Ryan McLeod	1st NHL goal	November 14, 2021
Philip Broberg	1st NHL game 1st NHL assist 1st NHL point	November 20, 2021
Connor McDavid	400th NHL assist	November 24, 2021
Zach Hyman	200th NHL point	November 27, 2021
Kris Russell	2,000th NHL shot block	November 27, 2021
Markus Niemelainen	1st NHL game	December 1, 2021
Leon Draisaitl	500th NHL game	December 3, 2021
Ryan Nugent-Hopkins	500th NHL point	December 3, 2021
Cooper Marody	1st NHL assist 1st NHL point	December 18, 2021
Dmitri Samorukov	1st NHL game	December 29, 2021
Kris Russell	900th NHL game	January 29, 2022
Zach Hyman	100th NHL goal	February 11, 2022
Derek Ryan	100th NHL assist	February 14, 2022
Stuart Skinner	1st NHL shutout	February 14, 2022
Tyler Benson	1st NHL goal	February 20, 2022
Ryan Nugent-Hopkins	700th NHL game	February 23, 2022
Markus Niemelainen	1st NHL assist 1st NHL point	February 26, 2022
Derek Ryan	1st NHL hat-trick	February 26, 2022
Brad Malone	200th NHL game	March 1, 2022
Cody Ceci	600th NHL game	March 3, 2022
Zach Hyman	400th NHL game	March 17, 2022
Evander Kane	800th NHL game	April 3, 2022
Zack Kassian	600th NHL game	April 7, 2022
Duncan Keith	2,000th NHL shot block	April 26, 2022
Philip Broberg	1st NHL goal	April 28, 2022

Playoffs
Player	Milestone	Reached
Evan Bouchard	1st NHL playoff game 1st NHL playoff assist 1st NHL playoff point	May 2, 2022
Kailer Yamamoto	1st NHL playoff goal	May 2, 2022
Ryan McLeod	1st NHL playoff goal 1st NHL playoff point	May 4, 2022
Darnell Nurse	1st NHL playoff goal	May 4, 2022
Dylan Holloway	1st NHL game 1st NHL playoff game	June 6, 2022

== Transactions ==
The Oilers have been involved in the following transactions during the 2021–22 season.

=== Trades ===
Date	Details		Ref
July 12, 2021	To Chicago Blackhawks Caleb Jones; Conditional^{1} 3rd-round pick in 2022	To Edmonton Oilers Duncan Keith; Tim Soderlund	
July 14, 2021	To Carolina Hurricanes Dylan Wells	To Edmonton Oilers Future considerations	
July 23, 2021	To Minnesota Wild 1st-round pick in 2021	To Edmonton Oilers 1st-round pick in 2021; PIT 3rd-round pick in 2021	
July 28, 2021	To Carolina Hurricanes Ethan Bear	To Edmonton Oilers Warren Foegele	
March 2, 2022	To San Jose Sharks Alex Stalock	To Edmonton Oilers Future considerations	
March 21, 2022	To Montreal Canadiens William Lagesson; Conditional^{2} 2nd-round pick in 2022; 7th-round pick in 2024	To Edmonton Oilers Brett Kulak	
March 21, 2022	To Philadelphia Flyers 4th-round pick in 2023	To Edmonton Oilers Derick Brassard	

Notes:

1. Chicago will receive a second-round pick in 2022 if Edmonton reaches the 2022 Stanley Cup Finals and Keith is among the top-four defensemen on the Oilers in time-on-ice during the first three rounds of the playoffs; otherwise Chicago will receive a third-round pick in 2022.
2. Montreal will instead receive Edmonton's 2nd-round pick in 2023 if Edmonton reaches the 2022 Stanley Cup Finals.

=== Players acquired ===
Date	Player	Former team	Term	Via	Ref
July 28, 2021	Cody Ceci	Pittsburgh Penguins	4-year	Free agency	
July 28, 2021	Zach Hyman	Toronto Maple Leafs	7-year	Free agency	
July 28, 2021	Derek Ryan	Calgary Flames	2-year	Free agency	
August 7, 2021	Brendan Perlini	HC Ambri-Piotta (NL)	1-year	Free agency	
October 13, 2021	Colton Sceviour	Pittsburgh Penguins	1-year	Free agency	
January 27, 2022	Evander Kane	San Jose Sharks	1-year	Free agency	
February 10, 2022	Brad Malone	Bakersfield Condors (AHL)	1-year	Free agency	
March 2, 2022	Vincent Desharnais	Bakersfield Condors (AHL)	2-year^{1}	Free agency	
March 2, 2022	James Hamblin	Bakersfield Condors (AHL)	2-year^{1}	Free agency	
March 29, 2022	Ryan Fanti	Minnesota Duluth Bulldogs (NCHC)	2-year^{1}	Free agency	
April 5, 2022	Noah Philp	Alberta Golden Bears (U Sports)	1-year^{1}	Free agency	

Notes:

1. Contract starts in the 2022-23 season.

=== Players lost ===
Date	Player	New team	Term	Via	Ref
July 21, 2021	Adam Larsson	Seattle Kraken		Expansion draft	
July 28, 2021	Jujhar Khaira	Chicago Blackhawks	2-year	Free agency	
July 28, 2021	James Neal			Buy-out	
July 29, 2021	Joe Gambardella	New Jersey Devils	2-year	Free agency	
July 29, 2021	Dmitri Kulikov	Minnesota Wild	2-year	Free agency	
August 1, 2021	Patrick Russell	Linköping HC (SHL)	2-year	Free agency	
August 3, 2021	Theodor Lennström	Torpedo Nizhny Novgorod (KHL)		Free agency	
September 1, 2021	Alan Quine	Henderson Silver Knights (AHL)	1-year	Free agency	
September 6, 2021	Dominik Kahun	SC Bern (NL)	3-year	Free agency	
October 7, 2021	Tyler Ennis	Ottawa Senators	1-year	Free agency	
October 9, 2021	James Neal	St. Louis Blues	1-year	Free agency	
October 12, 2021	Alex Chiasson	Vancouver Canucks	1-year	Free agency	
October 18, 2021	Kirill Maksimov			Contract termination	
December 26, 2021	Kirill Maksimov	Mikkelin Jukurit (Liiga)	1-year	Free agency	
January 22, 2022	Tim Soderlund			Contract termination	
January 22, 2022	Tim Soderlund	Djurgårdens IF (SHL)	1-year	Free agency	
May 18, 2022	Filip Berglund	Örebro HK (SHL)	2-year	Free agency	
May 26, 2022	Ostap Safin	HC Sparta Praha (ELH)	1-year	Free agency	
June 8, 2022	Ilya Konovalov			Contract termination	
June 8, 2022	Ilya Konovalov	Dynamo Moscow (KHL)	2-year	Free agency	
June 13, 2022	Mikko Koskinen	HC Lugano (NL)	1-year	Free agency	

=== Signings ===
Date	Player	Term	Contract type	Ref
July 24, 2021	Mike Smith	2-year	Re-signing	
July 28, 2021	Tyson Barrie	3-year	Re-signing	
July 31, 2021	Warren Foegele	3-year	Re-signing	
August 6, 2021	Darnell Nurse	8-year	Extension	
August 8, 2021	Stuart Skinner	2-year	Re-signing	
August 11, 2021	Tyler Benson	1-year	Re-signing	
August 12, 2021	Slater Koekkoek	2-year	Re-signing	
September 6, 2021	Tyler Tullio	3-year	Entry-level	
September 11, 2021	Cooper Marody	1-year	Re-signing	
September 18, 2021	Kailer Yamamoto	1-year	Re-signing	
November 10, 2021	Matvei Petrov	3-year	Entry-level	
March 2, 2022	Dmitri Samorukov	1-year	Extension	
March 3, 2022	Seth Griffith	2-year	Extension	
March 10, 2022	Markus Niemelainen	2-year	Extension	
March 31, 2022	Xavier Bourgault	3-year	Entry-level	
May 11, 2022	Carter Savoie	3-year	Entry-level	
June 13, 2022	Brad Malone	2-year	Extension	

== Draft picks ==
Below are the Edmonton Oilers' selections at the 2021 NHL entry draft, which were held on July 23 to 24, 2021. It was held virtually via Video conference call from the NHL Network studio in Secaucus, New Jersey.

Round	#	Player	Pos	Nationality	College/Junior/Club team (League)
1	22	Xavier Bourgault	C	Canada	Shawinigan Cataractes (QMJHL)
3	90	Luca Munzenberger	D	Germany	Kolner Junghaie U20 (DNL)
4	116	Jake Chiasson	C	Canada	Brandon Wheat Kings (WHL)
6	180	Matvey Petrov	LW	Russia	Krylya Sovetov Moscow (MHL)
6	186	Shane Lachance	LW	USA	Boston Junior Bruins (USPHL)
7	212	Maximus Wanner	D	Canada	Moose Jaw Warriors (WHL)
