= 2021–22 Chicago Blackhawks season =

Season of play of professional ice hockey team

2021–22 Chicago Blackhawks
- Division: 7th Central
- Conference: 14th Western
- 2021–22 record: 28–42–12
- Home record: 14–21–6
- Road record: 14–21–6
- Goals for: 219
- Goals against: 291

Team information
- General manager: Stan Bowman (Oct. 13 – Oct. 26); Kyle Davidson (Oct. 26 – Apr. 29)
- Coach: Jeremy Colliton (Oct. 13 – Nov. 6); Derek King (interim, Nov. 6 – Apr. 29)
- Captain: Jonathan Toews
- Alternate captains: Alex DeBrincat; Patrick Kane; Connor Murphy
- Arena: United Center
- Average attendance: 18,489
- Minor league affiliates: Rockford IceHogs (AHL); Indy Fuel (ECHL)

Team leaders
- Goals: Alex DeBrincat (41)
- Assists: Patrick Kane (66)
- Points: Patrick Kane (92)
- Penalty minutes: Connor Murphy (47)
- Plus/minus: 3 tied (0)
- Wins: Marc-Andre Fleury (19)
- Goals against average: Marc-Andre Fleury (2.95)

The 2021–22 Chicago Blackhawks season was the 96th season for the National Hockey League (NHL) franchise that was established on September 25, 1926. The Blackhawks were led by Jeremy Colliton until he was fired on November 6, 2021, after the team started with a 1–9–2 record; he has been replaced by interim coach Derek King.

After the prior season was shortened and realigned due to the ongoing COVID-19 pandemic, the NHL announced that divisions and conferences would be used for the season. Realignment of divisions occurred as the Seattle Kraken began their first season in the Pacific Division while the Arizona Coyotes moved to the Central Division.

The Blackhawks were eliminated from playoff contention of April 5, 2022, after wins by the Dallas Stars and Nashville Predators.

== Off-season ==
=== Trades and acquisitions ===
The Blackhawks traded two-time Norris Trophy-winner Duncan Keith to Edmonton on July 12, 2021, after 16 years with the Hawks. The Hawks received Caleb Jones, brother of Columbus defenseman Seth Jones in the trade. On July 23, the Hawks acquired Seth Jones from Columbus and signed him to an eight-year extension. Four days later, goaltender Marc-André Fleury was traded by Vegas to the Blackhawks.

=== Return of Toews ===
Blackhawk captain Jonathan Toews returned to the team for the season after missing the entire 2020–21 season due to an undisclosed injury which was later revealed to be chronic immune response syndrome.

== Season summary ==
=== Sexual assault allegations ===
In May 2021, Kyle Beach (who did not disclose his name until after the Blackhawks released their report), a former Blackhawks prospect, filed a lawsuit against the Blackhawks organization for failing to file a proper police report or properly handle his report that he was sexually assaulted by video coach Brad Aldrich during the 2010 Stanley Cup playoffs. On October 26, the Blackhawks released the findings of the investigation conducted by Jenner & Block and announced general manager/president of hockey operations Stan Bowman and senior vice president of hockey operations Al MacIsaac resigned. The Blackhawks promoted Kyle Davidson to serve as their interim general manager, and then formally named him general manager on March 1, 2022. The team also received a $2-million fine from the NHL for failing to adequately and timely address Beach's allegations.

=== Poor start and firing of Jeremy Colliton ===
Opening their season with six straight losses, the Blackhawks broke a 51-year-old NHL record previously held by the 1970–71 California Golden Seals for the most minutes played at the start of a season without holding a lead. At nine consecutive losses, the Blackhawks set a new record for worst season start in franchise history in a 1–0 loss to the St. Louis Blues on October 30, 2021.

Colliton was fired following the team's 11th loss of the season and with a record 1–9–2. King won his first game as head coach on November 7.

== Standings ==
=== Divisional standings ===
Central Division
Pos	Team	GP	W	L	OTL	RW	GF	GA	GD	Pts
1	z – Colorado Avalanche	82	56	19	7	46	312	234	+78	119
2	x – Minnesota Wild	82	53	22	7	37	310	253	+57	113
3	x – St. Louis Blues	82	49	22	11	43	311	242	+69	109
4	x – Dallas Stars	82	46	30	6	31	238	246	−8	98
5	x – Nashville Predators	82	45	30	7	35	266	252	+14	97
6	Winnipeg Jets	82	39	32	11	31	252	257	−5	89
7	Chicago Blackhawks	82	28	42	12	16	219	291	−72	68
8	Arizona Coyotes	82	25	50	7	18	207	313	−106	57

Source: National Hockey League
Rules for classification: 1) Fewer number of games played (GP, only during regular season); 2) Greater number of regulation wins (RW); 3) Greater number of wins in regulation and overtime, excluding shootout wins (ROW); 4) Greater number of total wins, including shootouts (W); 5) Greater number of points earned in head-to-head play; if teams played an uneven number of head-to-head games, the result of the first game on the home ice of the team with the extra home game is discarded; 6) Greater goal differential (GD); 7) Greater number of goals scored (GF)
x – Clinched playoff spot; z – Clinched conference

=== Conference standings ===
Western Conference Wild Card
Pos	Div	Team	GP	W	L	OTL	RW	GF	GA	GD	Pts
1	CE	x – Dallas Stars	82	46	30	6	31	238	246	−8	98
2	CE	x – Nashville Predators	82	45	30	7	35	266	252	+14	97
3	PA	Vegas Golden Knights	82	43	31	8	34	266	248	+18	94
4	PA	Vancouver Canucks	82	40	30	12	32	249	236	+13	92
5	CE	Winnipeg Jets	82	39	32	11	32	252	257	−5	89
6	PA	San Jose Sharks	82	32	37	13	22	214	264	−50	77
7	PA	Anaheim Ducks	82	31	37	14	22	232	271	−39	76
8	CE	Chicago Blackhawks	82	28	42	12	16	219	291	−72	68
9	PA	Seattle Kraken	82	27	49	6	23	216	285	−69	60
10	CE	Arizona Coyotes	82	25	50	7	18	207	313	−106	57

Source: National Hockey League
Rules for classification: 1) Fewer number of games played (GP, only during regular season); 2) Greater number of regulation wins (RW); 3) Greater number of wins in regulation and overtime, excluding shootout wins (ROW); 4) Greater number of total wins, including shootouts (W); 5) Greater number of points earned in head-to-head play; if teams played an uneven number of head-to-head games, the result of the first game on the home ice of the team with the extra home game is discarded; 6) Greater goal differential (GD); 7) Greater number of goals scored (GF)
x – Clinched playoff spot

== Schedule and results ==
=== Preseason ===
The preseason schedule was published on July 19, 2021.

2021 preseason game log: 3–1–2 (home: 1–1–1; road: 2–0–1)
#	Date	Opponent	Score	OT	Decision	Arena	Attendance	Record	Streak	Recap
1	September 29	Detroit	3–4	SO	Lankinen	United Center	—	0–0–1	O1
2	October 1	St. Louis	3–6		Fleury	United Center	16,445	0–1–1	L1
3	October 2	@ St. Louis	5–1		Subban	Cable Dahmer Arena	—	1–1–1	W1
4	October 4	@ Detroit	6–4		Fleury	Little Caesars Arena	14,769	2–1–1	W2
5	October 7	@ Minnesota	2–3	OT	Lankinen	Xcel Energy Center	14,419	2–1–2	O1
6	October 9	Minnesota	5–1		Fleury	United Center	17,657	3–1–2	W1

=== Regular season ===
The regular season schedule was published on July 23, 2021.

2021–22 game log

October: 0–7–2 (home: 0–3–1; road: 0–4–1)
#	Date	Opponent	Score	OT	Decision	Attendance	Record	Pts	Recap
1	October 13	@ Colorado	2–4		Fleury	18,037	0–1–0	0
2	October 15	@ New Jersey	3–4	OT	Lankinen	16,514	0–1–1	1
3	October 16	@ Pittsburgh	2–5		Fleury	18,420	0–2–1	1
4	October 19	NY Islanders	1–4		Fleury	20,279	0–3–1	1
5	October 21	Vancouver	1–4		Lankinen	20,490	0–4–1	1
6	October 24	Detroit	3–6		Fleury	19,042	0–5–1	1
7	October 27	Toronto	2–3	OT	Lankinen	18,616	0–5–2	2
8	October 29	@ Carolina	3–6		Lankinen	16,434	0–6–2	2
9	October 30	@ St. Louis	0–1		Fleury	16,856	0–7–2	2

November: 7–5–0 (home: 5–2–0; road: 2–3–0)
#	Date	Opponent	Score	OT	Decision	Attendance	Record	Pts	Recap
10	November 1	Ottawa	5–1		Fleury	15,946	1–7–2	4
11	November 3	Carolina	3–4		Fleury	16,449	1–8–2	4
12	November 5	@ Winnipeg	1–5		Fleury	13,756	1–9–2	4
13	November 7	Nashville	2–1	OT	Lankinen	16,891	2–9–2	6
14	November 9	Pittsburgh	3–2	SO	Fleury	17,736	3–9–2	8
15	November 12	Arizona	2–1		Fleury	17,828	4–9–2	10
16	November 17	@ Seattle	4–2		Fleury	17,151	5–9–2	12
17	November 20	@ Edmonton	2–5		Lankinen	18,347	5–10–2	12
18	November 21	@ Vancouver	1–0		Fleury	18,830	6–10–2	14
19	November 23	@ Calgary	2–5		Fleury	15,464	6–11–2	14
20	November 26	St. Louis	3–2	OT	Lankinen	19,681	7–11–2	16
21	November 28	San Jose	0–2		Fleury	17,663	7–12–2	16

December: 4–3–2 (home: 1–1–1; road: 3–2–1)
#	Date	Opponent	Score	OT	Decision	Attendance	Record	Pts	Recap
22	December 2	@ Washington	4–3	SO	Fleury	18,573	8–12–2	18
23	December 4	@ NY Rangers	2–3		Lankinen	17,046	8–13–2	18
24	December 5	@ NY Islanders	3–2	SO	Fleury	17,255	9–13–2	20
25	December 7	NY Rangers	2–6		Fleury	17,207	9–14–2	20
26	December 9	@ Montreal	2–0		Fleury	20,447	10–14–2	22
27	December 11	@ Toronto	4–5		Lankinen	18,934	10–15–2	22
—	December 13	Calgary	Postponed due to COVID-19. Moved to April 18.
28	December 15	Washington	5–4	OT	Fleury	18,260	11–15–2	24
29	December 17	Nashville	2–3	OT	Fleury	18,298	11–15–3	25
30	December 18	@ Dallas	3–4	OT	Lankinen	18,532	11–15–4	26
—	December 21	Florida	Postponed due to COVID-19. Moved to February 20.
—	December 23	Dallas	Postponed due to COVID-19. Moved to February 18.
—	December 28	Columbus	Postponed due to COVID-19. Moved to February 17.
—	December 29	@ Winnipeg	Postponed due to COVID-19. Moved to February 14.

January: 5–7–3 (home: 2–4–1; road: 3–3–2)
#	Date	Opponent	Score	OT	Decision	Attendance	Record	Pts	Recap
31	January 1	@ Nashville	1–6		Delia	17,504	11–16–4	26
32	January 2	Calgary	1–5		Soderblom	17,454	11–17–4	26
33	January 4	Colorado	3–4	OT	Fleury	16,784	11–17–5	27
34	January 6	@ Arizona	4–6		Fleury	11,632	11–18–5	27
35	January 8	@ Vegas	2–1		Fleury	18,367	12–18–5	29
36	January 11	@ Columbus	4–2		Fleury	15,444	13–18–5	31
37	January 13	Montreal	3–2	OT	Fleury	17,472	14–18–5	33
38	January 15	Anaheim	3–0		Fleury	18,469	15–18–5	35
39	January 17	@ Seattle	2–3	SO	Fleury	17,151	15–18–6	36
—	January 18	@ Edmonton	Postponed due to COVID-19. Moved to February 9.
40	January 21	Minnesota	1–5		Fleury	17,921	15–19–6	36
41	January 22	@ Minnesota	3–4	OT	Lankinen	19,092	15–19–7	37
42	January 24	@ Colorado	0–2		Fleury	16,503	15–20–7	37
43	January 26	@ Detroit	8–5		Fleury	16,578	16–20–7	39
44	January 28	Colorado	4–6		Fleury	17,992	16–21–7	39
45	January 31	Vancouver	1–3		Fleury	17,170	16–22–7	39

February: 3–5–1 (home: 1–4–1; road: 2–1–0)
#	Date	Opponent	Score	OT	Decision	Attendance	Record	Pts	Recap
46	February 2	Minnesota	0–5		Fleury	16,373	16–23–7	39
47	February 9	@ Edmonton	4–1		Fleury	9,150	17–23–7	41
48	February 12	@ St. Louis	1–5		Fleury	18,096	17–24–7	41
49	February 14	@ Winnipeg	3–1		Fleury	7,511	18–24–7	43
50	February 17	Columbus	4–7		Soderblom	19,290	18–25–7	43
51	February 18	Dallas	0–1	SO	Fleury	19,845	18–25–8	44
52	February 20	Florida	2–5		Fleury	19,619	18–26–8	44
53	February 25	New Jersey	8–5		Lankinen	19,343	19–26–8	46
54	February 27	St. Louis	0–4		Fleury	19,588	19–27–8	46

March: 5–7–2 (home: 2–3–1; road: 3–4–1)
#	Date	Opponent	Score	OT	Decision	Attendance	Record	Pts	Recap
55	March 3	Edmonton	4–3	OT	Fleury	19,688	20–27–8	48
56	March 5	@ Philadelphia	3–4		Lankinen	18,448	20–28–8	48
57	March 6	Tampa Bay	3–6		Fleury	18,856	20–29–8	48
58	March 8	Anaheim	8–3		Fleury	18,591	21–29–8	50
59	March 10	@ Boston	3–4		Lankinen	17,850	21–30–8	50
60	March 12	@ Ottawa	6–3		Fleury	14,252	22–30–8	52
61	March 15	Boston	1–2	OT	Fleury	19,629	22–30–9	53
62	March 19	@ Minnesota	1–3		Lankinen	19,226	22–31–9	53
63	March 20	Winnipeg	4–6		Fleury	19,251	22–32–9	53
64	March 23	@ Anaheim	4–2		Lankinen	11,740	23–32–9	55
65	March 24	@ Los Angeles	4–3	SO	Delia	13,518	24–32–9	57
66	March 26	@ Vegas	4–5	OT	Lankinen	18,301	24–32–10	58
67	March 28	Buffalo	5–6		Lankinen	18,648	24–33–10	58
68	March 31	@ Florida	0–4		Delia	15,218	24–34–10	58

April: 4–8–2 (home: 3–4–1; road: 1–4–1)
#	Date	Opponent	Score	OT	Decision	Attendance	Record	Pts	Recap
69	April 1	@ Tampa Bay	2–5		Lankinen	19,092	24–35–10	58
70	April 3	Arizona	2–3	OT	Lankinen	19,869	24–35–11	59
71	April 7	Seattle	0–2		Lankinen	18,677	24–36–11	59
72	April 10	Dallas	4–6		Lankinen	18,809	24–37–11	59
73	April 12	Los Angeles	2–5		Delia	18,032	24–38–11	59
74	April 14	San Jose	5–4	SO	Lankinen	19,501	25–38–11	61
75	April 16	@ Nashville	3–4		Lankinen	17,159	25–39–11	61
76	April 18	Calgary	2–5		Lankinen	18,523	25–40–11	61
77	April 20	@ Arizona	4–3	OT	Lankinen	11,916	26–40–11	63
78	April 21	@ Los Angeles	1–4		Delia	18,230	26–41–11	63
79	April 23	@ San Jose	1–4		Lankinen	17,562	26–42–11	63
80	April 25	Philadelphia	3–1		Lankinen	18,642	27–42–11	65
81	April 27	Vegas	4–3	SO	Lankinen	19,660	28–42–11	67
82	April 29	@ Buffalo	2–3	OT	Delia	16,505	28–42–12	68

Legend: Win (2 points) Loss (0 points) Overtime/shootout loss (1 point)

== Player statistics ==
=== Skaters ===
Regular season
Player	GP	G	A	Pts	+/−	PIM
Patrick Kane	78	26	66	92	−19	18
Alex DeBrincat	82	41	37	78	−13	19
Seth Jones	78	5	46	51	−37	28
Dylan Strome	69	22	26	48	−6	28
Brandon Hagel^{‡}	55	21	16	37	−14	23
Jonathan Toews	71	12	25	37	−14	39
Dominik Kubalik	78	15	17	32	−16	16
Kirby Dach	70	9	17	26	−18	43
Jake McCabe	75	4	18	22	−27	33
Philipp Kurashev	67	6	15	21	−16	12
Erik Gustafsson	59	3	15	18	−4	14
Caleb Jones	51	5	10	15	−3	18
MacKenzie Entwistle	55	5	7	12	−16	23
Riley Stillman	52	2	10	12	−8	36
Sam Lafferty^{†}	46	5	6	11	−16	21
Ryan Carpenter^{‡}	59	3	8	11	−10	36
Taylor Raddysh^{†}	21	6	4	10	−4	2
Connor Murphy	57	4	6	10	−14	47
Calvin de Haan	69	4	4	8	−21	33
Henrik Borgstrom	52	4	3	7	−14	22
Tyler Johnson	26	3	4	7	−8	12
Reese Johnson	37	1	5	6	−13	16
Jujhar Khaira	27	3	0	3	−4	13
Adam Gaudette^{‡}	8	1	1	2	−3	4
Alex Vlasic	15	1	1	2	−2	2
Mike Hardman	21	0	2	2	−6	11
Alec Regula	15	1	0	1	−1	12
Boris Katchouk^{†}	21	1	0	1	−10	14
Lukas Reichel	11	0	1	1	−8	0
Josiah Slavin	15	0	1	1	0	4
Ian Mitchell	8	0	1	1	−3	0
Brett Connolly	9	0	1	1	−3	15
Isaak Phillips	4	0	0	0	−1	4
Nicolas Beaudin	2	0	0	0	−1	0
Wyatt Kalynuk	5	0	0	0	−3	2
Jakub Galvas	6	0	0	0	0	0
Kurtis Gabriel	2	0	0	0	0	0

=== Goaltenders ===
Regular season
Player	GP	GS	TOI	W	L	OT	GA	GAA	SA	SV%	SO	G	A	PIM
Marc-Andre Fleury^{‡}	45	45	2,626:58	19	21	5	129	2.95	1,398	.908	4	0	1	2
Kevin Lankinen	32	29	1,815:35	8	15	6	106	3.50	973	.891	0	0	1	0
Collin Delia	8	6	343:06	1	4	1	22	3.85	218	.899	0	0	0	0
Arvid Soderblom	3	2	155:49	0	2	0	13	5.01	95	.863	0	0	0	0

^{†}Denotes player spent time with another team before joining the Blackhawks. Stats reflect time with the Blackhawks only.
^{‡}Denotes player was traded mid-season. Stats reflect time with the Blackhawks only.
Bold/italics denotes franchise record.

== Transactions ==
The Blackhawks have been involved in the following transactions during the 2021–22 season.

=== Trades ===
Date	Details		Ref
July 12, 2021	To Edmonton Oilers Duncan Keith; Tim Soderlund	To Chicago Blackhawks Caleb Jones; Conditional^{1} 2nd-round pick in 2022	
July 23, 2021	To Columbus Blue Jackets Adam Boqvist; 1st-round pick in 2021; 2nd-round pick in 2021; Conditional^{2} 1st-round pick in 2022 or 2023	To Chicago Blackhawks Seth Jones; TBL 1st-round pick in 2021; 6th-round pick in 2022	
July 24, 2021	To Carolina Hurricanes 3rd-round pick in 2022	To Chicago Blackhawks 3rd-round pick in 2021	
July 27, 2021	To Vegas Golden Knights Mikael Hakkarainen	To Chicago Blackhawks Marc-Andre Fleury	
July 27, 2021	To Tampa Bay Lightning Brent Seabrook	To Chicago Blackhawks Tyler Johnson; 2nd-round pick in 2023	
July 28, 2021	To Calgary Flames Nikita Zadorov	To Chicago Blackhawks TOR 3rd-round pick in 2022	
December 9, 2021	To Toronto Maple Leafs Chad Krys	To Chicago Blackhawks Kurtis Gabriel	
January 5, 2022	To Pittsburgh Penguins Alexander Nylander	To Chicago Blackhawks Sam Lafferty	
March 18, 2022	To Tampa Bay Lightning Brandon Hagel; 4th-round pick in 2022; 4th-round pick in 2024	To Chicago Blackhawks Taylor Raddysh; Boris Katchouk; 1st-round pick in 2023; 1st-round pick in 2024	
March 21, 2022	To Minnesota Wild Marc-Andre Fleury	To Chicago Blackhawks Conditional^{3} 2nd-round pick in 2022	
March 21, 2022	To Calgary Flames Ryan Carpenter	To Chicago Blackhawks 5th-round pick in 2024	

Notes:

1. Chicago will receive a second-round pick in 2022 if Edmonton reaches the 2022 Stanley Cup Finals and Keith is among the top-four defensemen on the Oilers in time-on-ice during the first three rounds of the playoffs; otherwise Chicago will receive a third-round pick in 2022.
2. Columbus will receive Chicago's 1st-round pick in 2022 if the pick is outside the top two selections; otherwise Columbus will receive Chicago's 1st-round pick in 2023.
3. Chicago will receive Minnesota's 1st-round pick in 2022 if they reach the 2022 Western Conference Final and Fleury has at least four wins in the first two rounds; otherwise they will receive a 2nd-round pick.

=== Players acquired ===
Date	Player	Former team	Term	Via	Ref
July 28, 2021	Jujhar Khaira	Edmonton Oilers	2-year	Free agency	
July 28, 2021	Jake McCabe	Buffalo Sabres	4-year	Free agency	
October 11, 2021	Erik Gustafsson	Montreal Canadiens	1-year	Free agency	
December 31, 2021	Cale Morris	Rockford IceHogs (AHL)	1-year	Free agency	
March 23, 2022	Jaxson Stauber	Providence Friars (HE)	2-year	Free agency	
May 23, 2022	Filip Roos	Skellefteå AIK (SHL)	2-year	Free agency	

=== Players lost ===
Date	Player	New team	Term	Via	Ref
July 21, 2021	John Quenneville	Seattle Kraken		Expansion draft	
July 28, 2021	Vinnie Hinostroza	Buffalo Sabres	1-year	Free agency	
July 28, 2021	David Kampf	Toronto Maple Leafs	2-year	Free agency	
July 28, 2021	Pius Suter	Detroit Red Wings	2-year	Free agency	
August 20, 2021	Anton Lindholm	HC Dinamo Minsk (KHL)	1-year	Free agency	
September 10, 2021	Josh Dickinson	Toledo Walleye (ECHL)	1-year	Free agency	
September 17, 2021	Zack Smith			Retirement	
October 13, 2021	Matej Chalupa			Contract termination	
November 27, 2021	Adam Gaudette	Ottawa Senators		Waivers	

=== Signings ===
Date	Player	Term	Contract type	Ref
July 26, 2021	Adam Gaudette	1-year	Re-signing	
July 28, 2021	Seth Jones	8-year	Extension	
August 6, 2021	Brandon Hagel	3-year	Re-signing	
August 10, 2021	Mike Hardman	2-year	Re-signing	
August 16, 2021	Alexander Nylander	1-year	Re-signing	
August 18, 2021	MacKenzie Entwistle	2-year	Re-signing	
August 31, 2021	Connor Murphy	4-year	Extension	
September 16, 2021	Nolan Allan	3-year	Entry-level	
October 1, 2021	Colton Dach	3-year	Entry-level	
November 2, 2021	Louis Crevier	3-year	Entry-level	
March 15, 2022	Alex Vlasic	3-year	Entry-level	
April 13, 2022	Reese Johnson	2-year	Extension	
April 22, 2022	Ethan Del Mastro	3-year	Entry-level	
April 29, 2022	Sam Lafferty	2-year	Extension	

== Draft picks ==
Below are the Chicago Blackhawks' selections at the 2021 NHL entry draft, which were held on July 23 to 24, 2021. It was held virtually via Video conference call from the NHL Network studio in Secaucus, New Jersey.

Round	#	Player	Pos.	Nationality	Team (League)
1	32	Nolan Allan	D	Canada	Prince Albert Raiders (WHL)
2	62	Colton Dach	C	Canada	Saskatoon Blades (WHL)
3	91	Taige Harding	D	Canada	Fort McMurray Oil Barons (AJHL)
4	105	Ethan Del Mastro	D	Canada	Mississauga Steelheads (OHL)
4	108	Victor Stjernborg	C	Sweden	Vaxjo Lakers (SHL)
6	172	Ilya Safonov	C	Russia	Irbis Kazan (MHL)
7	204	Connor Kelley	D	USA	Minnesota Duluth Bulldogs (NCHC)
7	216	Jalen Luypen	D	Canada	Edmonton Oil Kings (WHL)
