= 2021–22 Colorado Avalanche season =

Season of play of professional ice hockey team

2021–22 Colorado Avalanche
- Stanley Cup champions
- Western Conference champions
- Central Division champions
- Division: 1st Central
- Conference: 1st Western
- 2021–22 record: 56–19–7
- Home record: 32–5–4
- Road record: 24–14–3
- Goals for: 312
- Goals against: 234

Team information
- General manager: Joe Sakic
- Coach: Jared Bednar
- Captain: Gabriel Landeskog
- Alternate captains: Nathan MacKinnon; Mikko Rantanen
- Arena: Ball Arena
- Average attendance: 17,498
- Minor league affiliates: Colorado Eagles (AHL); Utah Grizzlies (ECHL)

Team leaders
- Goals: Mikko Rantanen (36)
- Assists: Nazem Kadri (59)
- Points: Mikko Rantanen (92)
- Penalty minutes: Kurtis MacDermid (89)
- Plus/minus: Devon Toews (+52)
- Wins: Darcy Kuemper (37)
- Goals against average: Darcy Kuemper (2.54)

The 2021–22 Colorado Avalanche season was the 43rd season for the National Hockey League (NHL) franchise that joined the league in 1979, 26th playing season since the franchise relocated from Quebec prior to the start of the 1995–96 NHL season, and 50th season overall, including their play in the World Hockey Association (WHA), where the franchise was established in 1972.

On April 5, 2022, the Avalanche clinched a playoff berth after a 6–4 win against the Pittsburgh Penguins. On April 16, the Avalanche clinched the Central Division along with the top seed in the Western Conference after a 7–4 win against the Carolina Hurricanes. They went on to earn 119 points, breaking the franchise record set in 2000-01.

On June 6, the Avalanche swept the Edmonton Oilers to advance to their first Stanley Cup Final since 2001. On June 26, 2022, the Avalanche won their third Stanley Cup and first since 2001 after they defeated the two-time defending champion Tampa Bay Lightning in the Stanley Cup Final in six games.

== Standings ==
=== Divisional standings ===
Central Division
Pos	Team	GP	W	L	OTL	RW	GF	GA	GD	Pts
1	z – Colorado Avalanche	82	56	19	7	46	312	234	+78	119
2	x – Minnesota Wild	82	53	22	7	37	310	253	+57	113
3	x – St. Louis Blues	82	49	22	11	43	311	242	+69	109
4	x – Dallas Stars	82	46	30	6	31	238	246	−8	98
5	x – Nashville Predators	82	45	30	7	35	266	252	+14	97
6	Winnipeg Jets	82	39	32	11	31	252	257	−5	89
7	Chicago Blackhawks	82	28	42	12	16	219	291	−72	68
8	Arizona Coyotes	82	25	50	7	18	207	313	−106	57

Source: National Hockey League
Rules for classification: 1) Fewer number of games played (GP, only during regular season); 2) Greater number of regulation wins (RW); 3) Greater number of wins in regulation and overtime, excluding shootout wins (ROW); 4) Greater number of total wins, including shootouts (W); 5) Greater number of points earned in head-to-head play; if teams played an uneven number of head-to-head games, the result of the first game on the home ice of the team with the extra home game is discarded; 6) Greater goal differential (GD); 7) Greater number of goals scored (GF)
x – Clinched playoff spot; z – Clinched conference

=== Conference standings ===
Western Conference Wild Card
Pos	Div	Team	GP	W	L	OTL	RW	GF	GA	GD	Pts
1	CE	x – Dallas Stars	82	46	30	6	31	238	246	−8	98
2	CE	x – Nashville Predators	82	45	30	7	35	266	252	+14	97
3	PA	Vegas Golden Knights	82	43	31	8	34	266	248	+18	94
4	PA	Vancouver Canucks	82	40	30	12	32	249	236	+13	92
5	CE	Winnipeg Jets	82	39	32	11	32	252	257	−5	89
6	PA	San Jose Sharks	82	32	37	13	22	214	264	−50	77
7	PA	Anaheim Ducks	82	31	37	14	22	232	271	−39	76
8	CE	Chicago Blackhawks	82	28	42	12	16	219	291	−72	68
9	PA	Seattle Kraken	82	27	49	6	23	216	285	−69	60
10	CE	Arizona Coyotes	82	25	50	7	18	207	313	−106	57

Source: National Hockey League
Rules for classification: 1) Fewer number of games played (GP, only during regular season); 2) Greater number of regulation wins (RW); 3) Greater number of wins in regulation and overtime, excluding shootout wins (ROW); 4) Greater number of total wins, including shootouts (W); 5) Greater number of points earned in head-to-head play; if teams played an uneven number of head-to-head games, the result of the first game on the home ice of the team with the extra home game is discarded; 6) Greater goal differential (GD); 7) Greater number of goals scored (GF)
x – Clinched playoff spot

== Schedule and results ==
=== Preseason ===
2021 preseason game log: 2–4–0 (home: 2–1–0; road: 0–3–0)
#	Date	Visitor	Score	Home	OT	Decision	Attendance	Record	Recap
1	September 28	Colorado	3–4	Vegas		Johansson	16,867	0–1–0
2	September 30	Minnesota	4–6	Colorado		Annunen	11,092	1–1–0
3	October 4	Colorado	1–3	Minnesota		Kuemper	13,112	1–2–0
4	October 5	Vegas	7–4	Colorado		Johansson	—	1–3–0
5	October 7	Colorado	1–3	Dallas		Kuemper	12,022	1–4–0
6	October 9	Dallas	2–4	Colorado		Johansson	—	2–4–0

=== Regular season ===
2021–22 game log

October: 4–4–0 (home: 2–2–0; road: 2–2–0)
#	Date	Visitor	Score	Home	OT	Decision	Attendance	Record	Pts	Recap
1	October 13	Chicago	2–4	Colorado		Kuemper	18,037	1–0–0	2
2	October 16	St. Louis	5–3	Colorado		Kuemper	18,022	1–1–0	2
3	October 19	Colorado	3–6	Washington		Kuemper	18,573	1–2–0	2
4	October 21	Colorado	1–4	Florida		Johansson	11,245	1–3–0	2
5	October 23	Colorado	4–3	Tampa Bay	SO	Kuemper	19,092	2–3–0	4
6	October 26	Vegas	3–1	Colorado		Kuemper	17,724	2–4–0	4
7	October 28	Colorado	4–3	St. Louis		Kuemper	16,558	3–4–0	6
8	October 30	Minnesota	1–4	Colorado		Kuemper	17,708	4–4–0	8

November: 7–2–1 (home: 5–0–1; road: 2–2–0)
#	Date	Visitor	Score	Home	OT	Decision	Attendance	Record	Pts	Recap
9	November 3	Columbus	5–4	Colorado	OT	Johansson	16,634	4–4–1	9
10	November 6	Colorado	2–4	Columbus		Kuemper	16,494	4–5–1	9
11	November 11	Vancouver	1–7	Colorado		Kuemper	17,226	5–5–1	11
12	November 13	San Jose	2–6	Colorado		Kuemper	18,015	6–5–1	13
13	November 17	Colorado	4–2	Vancouver		Kuemper	18,361	7–5–1	15
14	November 19	Colorado	7–3	Seattle		Kuemper	17,151	8–5–1	17
15	November 22	Ottawa	5–7	Colorado		Kuemper	16,706	9–5–1	19
16	November 24	Anaheim	2–5	Colorado		Johansson	16,343	10–5–1	21
17	November 26	Colorado	1–3	Dallas		Kuemper	18,532	10–6–1	21
18	November 27	Nashville	2–6	Colorado		Johansson	17,050	11–6–1	23

December: 6–2–1 (home: 3–0–0; road: 3–2–1)
#	Date	Visitor	Score	Home	OT	Decision	Attendance	Record	Pts	Recap
19	December 1	Colorado	3–8	Toronto		Johansson	18,931	11–7–1	23
20	December 2	Colorado	4–1	Montreal		Johansson	20,092	12–7–1	25
21	December 4	Colorado	5–6	Ottawa	OT	Annunen	14,237	12–7–2	26
22	December 6	Colorado	7–5	Philadelphia		Annunen	16,649	13–7–2	28
23	December 8	Colorado	7–3	NY Rangers		Kuemper	16,714	14–7–2	30
24	December 10	Detroit	3–7	Colorado		Kuemper	18,021	15–7–2	32
25	December 12	Florida	2–3	Colorado		Kuemper	16,548	16–7–2	34
26	December 14	NY Rangers	2–4	Colorado		Kuemper	17,198	17–7–2	36
27	December 16	Colorado	2–5	Nashville		Francouz	17,184	17–8–2	36
—	December 18	Tampa Bay		Colorado	Postponed due to COVID-19. Moved to February 10.
—	December 20	Colorado		Detroit	Postponed due to COVID-19. Moved to February 23.
—	December 22	Colorado		Buffalo	Postponed due to COVID-19. Moved to February 19.
—	December 23	Colorado		Boston	Postponed due to COVID-19. Moved to February 21.
—	December 27	Colorado		Vegas	Postponed due to COVID-19. Moved to February 16.
—	December 29	Dallas		Colorado	Postponed due to COVID-19. Moved to February 15.
—	December 31	Colorado		Dallas	Postponed due to COVID-19. Moved to February 13.

January: 15–0–1 (home: 10–0–0; road: 5–0–1)
#	Date	Visitor	Score	Home	OT	Decision	Attendance	Record	Pts	Recap
28	January 2	Anaheim	2–4	Colorado		Kuemper	17,305	18–8–2	38
29	January 4	Colorado	4–3	Chicago	OT	Kuemper	16,784	19–8–2	40
30	January 6	Winnipeg	1–7	Colorado		Kuemper	15,171	20–8–2	42
31	January 8	Toronto	4–5	Colorado	OT	Francouz	17,354	21–8–2	44
32	January 10	Seattle	3–4	Colorado		Francouz	17,516	22–8–2	46
33	January 11	Colorado	4–5	Nashville	OT	Kuemper	17,159	22–8–3	47
34	January 14	Arizona	3–4	Colorado	SO	Francouz	17,072	23–8–3	49
35	January 15	Colorado	5–0	Arizona		Kuemper	14,313	24–8–3	51
36	January 17	Minnesota	3–4	Colorado	SO	Francouz	17,565	25–8–3	53
37	January 19	Colorado	2–0	Anaheim		Francouz	11,240	26–8–3	55
38	January 20	Colorado	4–1	Los Angeles		Kuemper	15,387	27–8–3	57
39	January 22	Montreal	2–3	Colorado	OT	Kuemper	17,646	28–8–3	59
40	January 24	Chicago	0–2	Colorado		Francouz	16,503	29–8–3	61
41	January 26	Boston	3–4	Colorado	OT	Kuemper	18,041	30–8–3	63
42	January 28	Colorado	6–4	Chicago		Francouz	17,992	31–8–3	65
43	January 30	Buffalo	1–4	Colorado		Kuemper	17,456	32–8–3	67

February: 7–2–1 (home: 2–1–1; road: 5–1–0)
#	Date	Visitor	Score	Home	OT	Decision	Attendance	Record	Pts	Recap
44	February 1	Arizona	3–2	Colorado	SO	Kuemper	15,345	32–8–4	68
45	February 10	Tampa Bay	2–3	Colorado		Kuemper	18,018	33–8–4	70
46	February 13	Colorado	4–0	Dallas		Kuemper	18,167	34–8–4	72
47	February 15	Dallas	4–1	Colorado		Francouz	17,503	34–9–4	72
48	February 16	Colorado	2–0	Vegas		Kuemper	18,209	35–9–4	74
49	February 19	Colorado	5–3	Buffalo		Kuemper	10,526	36–9–4	76
50	February 21	Colorado	1–5	Boston		Kuemper	17,850	36–10–4	76
51	February 23	Colorado	5–2	Detroit		Francouz	18,562	37–10–4	78
52	February 25	Winnipeg	3–6	Colorado		Francouz	18,037	38–10–4	80
53	February 26	Colorado	3–2	Vegas		Kuemper	18,333	39–10–4	82

March: 9–4–2 (home: 5–1–1; road: 4–3–1)
#	Date	Visitor	Score	Home	OT	Decision	Attendance	Record	Pts	Recap
54	March 1	NY Islanders	3–5	Colorado		Kuemper	17,622	40–10–4	84
55	March 3	Colorado	1–2	Arizona		Francouz	10,840	40–11–4	84
56	March 5	Calgary	4–3	Colorado	OT	Francouz	18,087	40–11–5	85
57	March 7	Colorado	5–4	NY Islanders		Francouz	16,378	41–11–5	87
58	March 8	Colorado	3–5	New Jersey		Kuemper	12,181	41–12–5	87
59	March 10	Colorado	0–2	Carolina		Kuemper	18,056	41–13–5	87
60	March 13	Calgary	0–3	Colorado		Kuemper	18,081	42–13–5	89
61	March 15	Colorado	3–0	Los Angeles		Kuemper	13,967	43–13–5	91
62	March 18	Colorado	5–3	San Jose		Francouz	13,022	44–13–5	93
63	March 21	Edmonton	2–3	Colorado	OT	Kuemper	18,022	45–13–5	95
64	March 23	Vancouver	3–1	Colorado		Kuemper	17,482	45–14–5	95
65	March 25	Philadelphia	3–6	Colorado		Francouz	18,051	46–14–5	97
66	March 27	Colorado	2–3	Minnesota	OT	Kuemper	19,140	46–14–6	98
67	March 29	Colorado	2–1	Calgary		Kuemper	16,543	47–14–6	100
68	March 31	San Jose	2–4	Colorado		Francouz	18,013	48–14–6	102

April: 8–5–1 (home: 5–1–1; road: 3–4–0)
#	Date	Visitor	Score	Home	OT	Decision	Attendance	Record	Pts	Recap
69	April 2	Pittsburgh	2–3	Colorado		Kuemper	18,102	49–14–6	104
70	April 5	Colorado	6–4	Pittsburgh		Kuemper	17,409	50–14–6	106
71	April 8	Colorado	5–4	Winnipeg	OT	Francouz	13,900	51–14–6	108
72	April 9	Colorado	2–1	Edmonton	SO	Kuemper	18,347	52–14–6	110
73	April 13	Los Angeles	3–9	Colorado		Kuemper	18,017	53–14–6	112
74	April 14	New Jersey	1–3	Colorado		Francouz	18,024	54–14–6	114
75	April 16	Carolina	4–7	Colorado		Kuemper	18,091	55–14–6	116
76	April 18	Washington	3–2	Colorado		Kuemper	18,020	55–15–6	116
77	April 20	Colorado	2–3	Seattle		Francouz	17,151	55–16–6	116
78	April 22	Colorado	3–6	Edmonton		Kuemper	18,347	55–17–6	116
79	April 24	Colorado	1–4	Winnipeg		Kuemper	14,443	55–18–6	116
80	April 26	St. Louis	3–5	Colorado		Kuemper	18,071	56–18–6	118
81	April 28	Nashville	5–4	Colorado	SO	Kuemper	18,011	56–18–7	119
82	April 29	Colorado	1–4	Minnesota		Francouz	19,261	56–19–7	119

Legend: Win (2 points) Loss (0 points) Overtime/shootout loss (1 point)

=== Playoffs ===
2022 Stanley Cup playoffs

Western Conference First Round vs. (WC2) Nashville Predators: Colorado won 4–0
#	Date	Visitor	Score	Home	OT	Decision	Attendance	Series	Recap
1	May 3	Nashville	2–7	Colorado		Kuemper	18,091	1–0
2	May 5	Nashville	1–2	Colorado	OT	Kuemper	18,115	2–0
3	May 7	Colorado	7–3	Nashville		Francouz	17,430	3–0
4	May 9	Colorado	5–3	Nashville		Francouz	17,188	4–0

Western Conference Second Round vs. (C3) St. Louis Blues: Colorado won 4–2
#	Date	Visitor	Score	Home	OT	Decision	Attendance	Series	Recap
1	May 17	St. Louis	2–3	Colorado	OT	Kuemper	18,105	1–0
2	May 19	St. Louis	4–1	Colorado		Kuemper	18,117	1–1
3	May 21	Colorado	5–2	St. Louis		Kuemper	18,096	2–1
4	May 23	Colorado	6–3	St. Louis		Kuemper	18,096	3–1
5	May 25	St. Louis	5–4	Colorado	OT	Kuemper	18,117	3–2
6	May 27	Colorado	3–2	St. Louis		Kuemper	18,096	4–2

Western Conference Finals vs. (P2) Edmonton Oilers: Colorado won 4–0
#	Date	Visitor	Score	Home	OT	Decision	Attendance	Series	Recap
1	May 31	Edmonton	6–8	Colorado		Francouz	18,044	1–0
2	June 2	Edmonton	0–4	Colorado		Francouz	18,107	2–0
3	June 4	Colorado	4–2	Edmonton		Francouz	18,347	3–0
4	June 6	Colorado	6–5	Edmonton	OT	Francouz	18,347	4–0

Stanley Cup Finals vs. (A3) Tampa Bay Lightning: Colorado won 4–2
#	Date	Visitor	Score	Home	OT	Decision	Attendance	Series	Recap
1	June 15	Tampa Bay	3–4	Colorado	OT	Kuemper	17,778	1–0
2	June 18	Tampa Bay	0–7	Colorado		Kuemper	17,849	2–0
3	June 20	Colorado	2–6	Tampa Bay		Kuemper	19,092	2–1
4	June 22	Colorado	3–2	Tampa Bay	OT	Kuemper	19,092	3–1
5	June 24	Tampa Bay	3–2	Colorado		Kuemper	18,015	3–2
6	June 26	Colorado	2–1	Tampa Bay		Kuemper	19,092	4–2

Legend: Win Loss

== Player statistics ==
Final stats

Skaters

Regular season
Player	GP	G	A	Pts	+/–	PIM
Mikko Rantanen	75	36	56	92	+35	56
Nathan MacKinnon	65	32	56	88	+22	42
Nazem Kadri	71	28	59	87	+13	71
Cale Makar	77	28	58	86	+48	26
André Burakovsky	80	22	39	61	+12	18
Gabriel Landeskog	51	30	29	59	+27	78
Devon Toews	66	13	44	57	+52	20
Valeri Nichushkin	62	25	27	52	+21	14
J. T. Compher	70	18	15	33	+6	25
Alex Newhook	71	13	20	33	+11	12
Sam Girard	67	5	23	28	−4	20
Erik Johnson	77	8	17	25	+22	24
Logan O'Connor	81	8	16	24	+10	38
Nicolas Aubé-Kubel^{†}	67	11	11	22	+14	41
Bowen Byram	30	5	12	17	+7	12
Darren Helm	68	7	8	15	−5	14
Tyson Jost^{‡}	59	6	8	14	+1	30
Artturi Lehkonen^{†}	16	6	3	9	+1	8
Jack Johnson	74	1	8	9	+5	42
Josh Manson^{†}	22	2	5	7	−11	12
Kurtis MacDermid	58	2	3	5	+1	89
Ryan Murray	37	0	4	4	−3	2
Jayson Megna	20	0	3	3	−2	4
Nico Sturm^{†}	21	0	3	3	−2	6
Kiefer Sherwood	11	1	1	2	+3	0
Ben Meyers	5	1	0	1	−2	0
Andrew Cogliano^{†}	18	0	1	1	−2	8
Dylan Sikura	3	0	1	1	+1	0
Mikhail Maltsev	18	0	0	0	−5	2
Sampo Ranta	10	0	0	0	−4	2
Jacob MacDonald	7	0	0	0	−2	2
Martin Kaut	6	0	0	0	+2	0
Justin Barron	2	0	0	0	−1	0
Stefan Matteau	1	0	0	0	0	0
Jordan Gross	1	0	0	0	0	4

Playoffs
Player	GP	G	A	Pts	+/−	PIM
Cale Makar	20	8	21	29	+7	10
Mikko Rantanen	20	5	20	25	+3	4
Nathan MacKinnon	20	13	11	24	+11	8
Gabriel Landeskog	20	11	11	22	+15	6
Valeri Nichushkin	20	9	6	15	+6	8
Nazem Kadri	16	7	8	15	+7	8
Devon Toews	20	5	10	15	+5	8
Artturi Lehkonen	20	8	6	14	+2	20
Bowen Byram	20	0	9	9	+15	10
J. T. Compher	20	5	3	8	–1	10
André Burakovsky	12	3	5	8	+3	2
Josh Manson	20	3	5	8	+6	12
Andrew Cogliano	16	3	3	6	+5	16
Darren Helm	20	2	3	5	+3	12
Erik Johnson	20	1	4	5	+10	4
Logan O'Connor	17	1	3	4	+2	9
Alex Newhook	12	0	4	4	0	4
Sam Girard	7	1	2	3	−1	0
Nico Sturm	13	0	2	2	+2	2
Nicolas Aubé-Kubel	14	0	0	0	+2	4
Jack Johnson	13	0	0	0	+1	10

Goaltenders

Regular season
Player	GP	GS	TOI	W	L	OT	GA	GAA	SA	SV%	SO	G	A	PIM
Darcy Kuemper	57	57	3,258:07	37	12	4	138	2.52	1,754	.921	5	0	0	2
Pavel Francouz	21	18	1,200:09	15	5	1	51	2.55	608	.916	2	0	0	0
Jonas Johansson^{‡}	9	6	370:18	3	2	1	23	3.73	200	.885	0	0	0	0
Justus Annunen	2	1	96:46	1	0	1	7	4.34	51	.863	0	0	1	0

Playoffs
Player	GP	GS	TOI	W	L	GA	GAA	SA	SV%	SO	G	A	PIM
Darcy Kuemper	16	16	886:50	10	4	38	2.57	386	.902	1	0	1	2
Pavel Francouz	7	4	341:11	6	0	16	2.81	170	.906	1	0	0	0

^{†}Denotes player spent time with another team before joining the Avalanche. Stats reflect time with the Avalanche only.
^{‡}Denotes player was traded mid-season. Stats reflect time with the Avalanche only.
Bold/italics denotes franchise record.

=== Suspensions/fines ===
Player	Explanation	Length	Salary	Date issued
Gabriel Landeskog	Boarding against Chicago Blackhawks forward Kirby Dach during NHL game no. 5 in Colorado on Wednesday, October 13, 2021, at 16:22 of the third period.	2 games	$70,000	October 14, 2021

== Transactions ==
The Avalanche have been involved in the following transactions during the 2021–22 season.

=== Trades ===
Date	Details		Ref
July 15, 2021	To New Jersey Devils Ryan Graves	To Colorado Avalanche Mikhail Maltsev; NYI 2nd-round pick in 2021	
July 27, 2021	To Seattle Kraken 4th-round pick in 2023	To Colorado Avalanche Kurtis MacDermid	
July 28, 2021	To Arizona Coyotes Conor Timmins; 1st-round pick in 2022; Conditional^{[a]} 3rd-round pick in 2024	To Colorado Avalanche Darcy Kuemper	
March 14, 2022	To Anaheim Ducks Drew Helleson; 2nd-round pick in 2023	To Colorado Avalanche Josh Manson	
March 15, 2022	To Minnesota Wild Tyson Jost	To Colorado Avalanche Nico Sturm	
March 21, 2022	To Montreal Canadiens Justin Barron; 2nd-round pick in 2024	To Colorado Avalanche Artturi Lehkonen	
March 21, 2022	To San Jose Sharks 5th-round pick in 2024	To Colorado Avalanche Andrew Cogliano	

Notes:

1. Arizona will receive a third-round pick in 2024 if Colorado wins the 2022 Stanley Cup and Kuemper plays in 50% of their playoff games; otherwise no pick will be exchanged.

=== Players acquired ===
Date	Player	Former team	Term	Via	Ref
July 28, 2021	Roland McKeown	Carolina Hurricanes	2-year	Free agency	
July 29, 2021	Darren Helm	Detroit Red Wings	1-year	Free agency	
July 29, 2021	Stefan Matteau	Columbus Blue Jackets	1-year	Free agency	
July 29, 2021	Dylan Sikura	Vegas Golden Knights	1-year	Free agency	
July 31, 2021	Jordan Gross	Arizona Coyotes	1-year	Free agency	
August 2, 2021	Ryan Murray	New Jersey Devils	1-year	Free agency	
November 13, 2021	Nicolas Aube-Kubel	Philadelphia Flyers		Waivers	
December 16, 2021	Callahan Burke	Colorado Eagles (AHL)	1-year	Free agency	
April 12, 2022	Wyatt Aamodt	Minnesota State Mavericks (CCHA)	1-year	Free agency	
April 13, 2022	Ben Meyers	Minnesota Golden Gophers (B1G)	2-year	Free agency	
June 13, 2022	Lukas Sedlak	Traktor Chelyabinsk (KHL)	1-year	Free agency	

=== Players lost ===
Date	Player	New team	Term	Via	Ref
July 21, 2021	Joonas Donskoi	Seattle Kraken		Expansion draft	
July 22, 2021	Matt Calvert			Retirement	
July 28, 2021	Pierre-Edouard Bellemare	Tampa Bay Lightning	2-year	Free agency	
July 28, 2021	Kyle Burroughs	Vancouver Canucks	2-year	Free agency	
July 28, 2021	Sheldon Dries	Vancouver Canucks	1-year	Free agency	
July 28, 2021	Philipp Grubauer	Seattle Kraken	6-year	Free agency	
July 28, 2021	Patrik Nemeth	New York Rangers	3-year	Free agency	
July 28, 2021	Liam O'Brien	Arizona Coyotes	1-year	Free agency	
July 28, 2021	T. J. Tynan	Los Angeles Kings	1-year	Free agency	
July 28, 2021	Adam Werner	Calgary Flames	1-year	Free agency	
July 29, 2021	Dan Renouf	Detroit Red Wings	1-year	Free agency	
July 29, 2021	Brandon Saad	St. Louis Blues	5-year	Free agency	
August 5, 2021	Mike Vecchione	Washington Capitals	1-year	Free agency	
December 13, 2021	Jonas Johansson	Florida Panthers		Waivers	
June 15, 2022	Andreas Wingerli	Skellefteå AIK (SHL)	Unknown	Free agency	

=== Signings ===
Date	Player	Term	Contract type	Ref
July 22, 2021	Kiefer Sherwood	1-year	Re-signing	
July 24, 2021	Cale Makar	6-year	Re-signing	
July 27, 2021	Gabriel Landeskog	8-year	Re-signing	
August 6, 2021	Oskar Olausson	3-year	Entry-level	
August 16, 2021	Dennis Gilbert	1-year	Re-signing	
September 22, 2021	Logan O'Connor	1-year	Re-signing	
March 12, 2022	Pavel Francouz	2-year	Extension	
April 5, 2022	Kurtis MacDermid	2-year	Extension	
May 2, 2022	Danila Zhuravlyov	2-year	Entry-level	
July 5, 2022	Andrew Cogliano	1-year	Extension	

== Draft picks ==
Below are the Colorado Avalanche's selections at the 2021 NHL entry draft, which was held on July 23 and 24, 2021, virtually via video conference call from the NHL Network studios in Secaucus, New Jersey, due to the COVID-19 pandemic.

Round	#	Player	Pos.	Nationality	Team (League)
1	28	Oskar Olausson	RW	Sweden	HV71 (SHL)
2	61	Sean Behrens	D	United States	U.S. NTDP (USHL)
3	92	Andrei Buyalsky	C	Kazakhstan	Dubuque Fighting Saints (USHL)
7	220	Taylor Makar	LW	Canada	Brooks Bandits (AJHL)
