= 2021–22 Philadelphia Flyers season =

NHL hockey team season

2021–22 Philadelphia Flyers
- Division: 8th Metropolitan
- Conference: 15th Eastern
- 2021–22 record: 25–46–11
- Home record: 14–21–6
- Road record: 11–25–5
- Goals for: 211
- Goals against: 298

Team information
- General manager: Chuck Fletcher
- Coach: Alain Vigneault (Oct.–Dec.); Mike Yeo (Dec.–Apr.)
- Captain: Claude Giroux (Oct.–Mar.); Vacant (Mar.–Apr.)
- Alternate captains: Sean Couturier; Kevin Hayes; Ivan Provorov
- Arena: Wells Fargo Center
- Average attendance: 16,540
- Minor league affiliates: Lehigh Valley Phantoms (AHL); Reading Royals (ECHL)

Team leaders
- Goals: James van Riemsdyk (24)
- Assists: Travis Konecny (36)
- Points: Travis Konecny (52)
- Penalty minutes: Zack MacEwen (110)
- Plus/minus: Travis Sanheim (+9)
- Wins: Carter Hart (13)
- Goals against average: Carter Hart (3.16)

The 2021–22 Philadelphia Flyers season was the 55th season for the National Hockey League (NHL) franchise that was established on June 5, 1967. On March 29, 2022, the Flyers were eliminated from playoff contention, with a 4–1 loss to the Minnesota Wild. The Flyers missed the playoffs for the second year in a row, marking the first time since 1993–94 that the Flyers missed the playoffs in consecutive seasons. This was also their first losing season since 2006-07.

== Regular season ==
After losing 7–1 to the Tampa Bay Lightning for their seventh straight loss, head coach Alain Vigneault and assistant coach Michel Therrien were fired on December 6. Assistant coach Mike Yeo was named interim head coach.

Two days after playing in his 1,000th NHL game, captain Claude Giroux was traded to the Florida Panthers on March 19.

=== Standings ===
==== Divisional standings ====
Metropolitan Division
Pos	Team	GP	W	L	OTL	RW	GF	GA	GD	Pts
1	y – Carolina Hurricanes	82	54	20	8	47	278	202	+76	116
2	x – New York Rangers	82	52	24	6	44	254	207	+47	110
3	x – Pittsburgh Penguins	82	46	25	11	37	272	229	+43	103
4	x – Washington Capitals	82	44	26	12	35	275	245	+30	100
5	New York Islanders	82	37	35	10	34	231	237	−6	84
6	Columbus Blue Jackets	82	37	38	7	26	262	300	−38	81
7	New Jersey Devils	82	27	46	9	19	248	307	−59	63
8	Philadelphia Flyers	82	25	46	11	20	211	298	−87	61

Source: National Hockey League
Rules for classification: 1) Fewer number of games played (GP, only during regular season); 2) Greater number of regulation wins (RW); 3) Greater number of wins in regulation and overtime, excluding shootout wins (ROW); 4) Greater number of total wins, including shootouts (W); 5) Greater number of points earned in head-to-head play; if teams played an uneven number of head-to-head games, the result of the first game on the home ice of the team with the extra home game is discarded; 6) Greater goal differential (GD); 7) Greater number of goals scored (GF)
x – Clinched playoff spot; y – Clinched division

==== Conference standings ====
Eastern Conference Wild Card
Pos	Div	Team	GP	W	L	OTL	RW	GF	GA	GD	Pts
1	AT	x – Boston Bruins	82	51	26	5	40	255	220	+35	107
2	ME	x – Washington Capitals	82	44	26	12	35	275	245	+30	100
3	ME	New York Islanders	82	37	35	10	34	231	237	−6	84
4	ME	Columbus Blue Jackets	82	37	38	7	26	262	300	−38	81
5	AT	Buffalo Sabres	82	32	39	11	25	232	290	−58	75
6	AT	Detroit Red Wings	82	32	40	10	21	230	312	−82	74
7	AT	Ottawa Senators	82	33	42	7	26	227	266	−39	73
8	ME	New Jersey Devils	82	27	46	9	19	248	307	−59	63
9	ME	Philadelphia Flyers	82	25	46	11	20	211	298	−87	61
10	AT	Montreal Canadiens	82	22	49	11	16	221	319	−98	55

Source: National Hockey League
Rules for classification: 1) Fewer number of games played (GP, only during regular season); 2) Greater number of regulation wins (RW); 3) Greater number of wins in regulation and overtime, excluding shootout wins (ROW); 4) Greater number of total wins, including shootouts (W); 5) Greater number of points earned in head-to-head play; if teams played an uneven number of head-to-head games, the result of the first game on the home ice of the team with the extra home game is discarded; 6) Greater goal differential (GD); 7) Greater number of goals scored (GF)
x – Clinched playoff spot

== Schedule and results ==
=== Regular season ===
The Flyers' regular season schedule was released on July 22, 2021.

2021–22 regular season
October: 4–2–1 (home: 2–1–1; road: 2–1–0)

Game	Date	Visitor	Score	Home	OT	Decision	Attendance	Record	Points	Recap
1	October 15	Vancouver	5–4	Philadelphia	SO	Hart	19,338	0–0–1	1	OTL
2	October 18	Seattle	1–6	Philadelphia		Hart	17,727	1–0–1	3	W
3	October 20	Boston	3–6	Philadelphia		Jones	15,310	2–0–1	5	W
4	October 23	Florida	4–2	Philadelphia		Hart	16,936	2–1–1	5	L
5	October 27	Philadelphia	5–3	Edmonton		Hart	14,328	3–1–1	7	W
6	October 28	Philadelphia	2–1	Vancouver		Jones	18,344	4–1–1	9	W
7	October 30	Philadelphia	0–4	Calgary		Hart	15,319	4–2–1	9	L

November: 4–6–3 (home: 2–3–1; road: 2–3–2)

Game	Date	Visitor	Score	Home	OT	Decision	Attendance	Record	Points	Recap
8	November 2	Arizona	0–3	Philadelphia		Hart	16,057	5–2–1	11	W
9	November 4	Philadelphia	2–3	Pittsburgh	OT	Hart	17,037	5–2–2	12	OTL
10	November 6	Philadelphia	2–1	Washington		Jones	18,573	6–2–2	14	W
11	November 10	Toronto	3–0	Philadelphia		Hart	17,997	6–3–2	14	L
12	November 12	Philadelphia	2–1	Carolina		Hart	18,680	7–3–2	16	W
13	November 13	Philadelphia	2–5	Dallas		Jones	18,532	7–4–2	16	L
14	November 16	Calgary	1–2	Philadelphia	OT	Hart	16,278	8–4–2	18	W
15	November 18	Tampa Bay	4–3	Philadelphia	SO	Hart	18,243	8–4–3	19	OTL
16	November 20	Boston	5–2	Philadelphia		Jones	19,644	8–5–3	19	L
17	November 23	Philadelphia	0–4	Tampa Bay		Hart	19,092	8–6–3	19	L
18	November 24	Philadelphia	1–2	Florida	OT	Jones	15,545	8–6–4	20	OTL
19	November 26	Carolina	6–3	Philadelphia		Hart	18,959	8–7–4	20	L
20	November 28	Philadelphia	2–5	New Jersey		Jones	13,113	8–8–4	20	L
—	November 30	NY Islanders		Philadelphia	Postponed due to COVID-19. Moved to January 18.					

December: 5–4–2 (home: 2–2–0; road: 3–2–2)

Game	Date	Visitor	Score	Home	OT	Decision	Attendance	Record	Points	Recap
21	December 1	Philadelphia	1–4	NY Rangers		Hart	15,687	8–9–4	20	L
22	December 5	Tampa Bay	7–1	Philadelphia		Hart	16,014	8–10–4	20	L
23	December 6	Colorado	7–5	Philadelphia		Jones	16,649	8–11–4	20	L
24	December 8	Philadelphia	0–3	New Jersey		Hart	12,163	8–12–4	20	L
25	December 10	Philadelphia	4–3	Vegas		Hart	18,011	9–12–4	22	W
26	December 11	Philadelphia	5–3	Arizona		Jones	10,562	10–12–4	24	W
27	December 14	New Jersey	1–6	Philadelphia		Hart	18,594	11–12–4	26	W
28	December 16	Philadelphia	2–3	Montreal	SO	Hart	0	11–12–5	27	OTL
29	December 18	Ottawa	3–4	Philadelphia	OT	Jones	18,437	12–12–5	29	W
—	December 21	Washington		Philadelphia	Postponed due to COVID-19 Moved to February 17.					
—	December 23	Philadelphia		Pittsburgh	Postponed due to COVID-19. Moved to February 15.					
30	December 29	Philadelphia	3–2	Seattle	OT	Jones	17,151	13–12–5	31	W
31	December 30	Philadelphia	2–3	San Jose	OT	Sandstrom	12,540	13–12–6	32	OTL

January: 1–10–2 (home: 1–4–2; road: 0–6–0)

Game	Date	Visitor	Score	Home	OT	Decision	Attendance	Record	Points	Recap
32	January 1	Philadelphia	3–6	Los Angeles		Jones	14,301	13–13–6	32	L
33	January 4	Philadelphia	1–4	Anaheim		Hart	11,375	13–14–6	32	L
34	January 6	Pittsburgh	6–2	Philadelphia		Hart	17,944	13–15–6	32	L
35	January 8	San Jose	3–2	Philadelphia	OT	Jones	15,600	13–15–7	33	OTL
—	January 11	Carolina		Philadelphia	Postponed due to COVID-19. Moved to February 21.					
36	January 13	Philadelphia	2–3	Boston		Hart	17,850	13–16–7	33	L
37	January 15	NY Rangers	3–2	Philadelphia		Hart	18,293	13–17–7	33	L
38	January 17	Philadelphia	1–4	NY Islanders		Jones	17,255	13–18–7	33	L
—	January 18	Detroit		Philadelphia	Postponed due to rescheduling of November 30 game. Moved to February 9.					
39	January 18	NY Islanders	4–3	Philadelphia	SO	Hart	16,362	13–18–8	34	OTL
40	January 20	Columbus	2–1	Philadelphia		Hart	15,359	13–19–8	34	L
41	January 22	Philadelphia	3–6	Buffalo		Jones	9,264	13–20–8	34	L
42	January 24	Dallas	3–1	Philadelphia		Hart	14,868	13–21–8	34	L
43	January 25	Philadelphia	3–4	NY Islanders		Jones	17,255	13–22–8	34	L
44	January 29	Los Angeles	3–4	Philadelphia	OT	Hart	13,763	14–22–8	36	W

February: 2–4–2 (home: 2–3–1; road: 0–1–1)

Game	Date	Visitor	Score	Home	OT	Decision	Attendance	Record	Points	Recap
45	February 1	Winnipeg	1–3	Philadelphia		Hart	13,433	15–22–8	38	W
46	February 9	Detroit	6–3	Philadelphia		Hart	13,243	15–23–8	38	L
47	February 12	Philadelphia	2–4	Detroit		Hart	15,965	15–24–8	38	L
48	February 15	Philadelphia	4–5	Pittsburgh	OT	Hart	18,385	15–24–9	39	OTL
49	February 17	Washington	5–3	Philadelphia		Jones	16,886	15–25–9	39	L
50	February 21	Carolina	4–3	Philadelphia	OT	Jones	14,591	15–25–10	40	OTL
51	February 22	St. Louis	4–1	Philadelphia		Jones	14,929	15–26–10	40	L
52	February 26	Washington	1–2	Philadelphia		Hart	18,276	16–26–10	42	W

March: 5–9–1 (home: 4–2–1; road: 1–7–0)

Game	Date	Visitor	Score	Home	OT	Decision	Attendance	Record	Points	Recap
53	March 1	Edmonton	3–0	Philadelphia		Hart	15,114	16–27–10	42	L
54	March 3	Minnesota	5–4	Philadelphia		Hart	13,876	16–28–10	42	L
55	March 5	Chicago	3–4	Philadelphia		Jones	18,448	17–28–10	44	W
56	March 8	Vegas	1–2	Philadelphia		Hart	14,482	18–28–10	46	W
57	March 10	Philadelphia	3–6	Florida		Hart	17,193	18–29–10	46	L
58	March 12	Philadelphia	1–3	Carolina		Jones	18,680	18–30–10	46	L
59	March 13	Montreal	4–3	Philadelphia	OT	Hart	15,451	18–30–11	47	OTL
60	March 17	Nashville	4–5	Philadelphia		Hart	18,405	19–30–11	49	W
61	March 18	Philadelphia	1–3	Ottawa		Jones	11,431	19–31–11	49	L
62	March 20	NY Islanders	1–2	Philadelphia		Hart	17,218	20–31–11	51	W
63	March 22	Philadelphia	3–6	Detroit		Hart	15,521	20–32–11	51	L
64	March 24	Philadelphia	5–2	St. Louis		Jones	18,096	21–32–11	53	W
65	March 25	Philadelphia	3–6	Colorado		Hart	18,051	21–33–11	53	L
66	March 27	Philadelphia	4–5	Nashville		Jones	17,414	21–34–11	53	L
67	March 29	Philadelphia	1–4	Minnesota		Jones	17,874	21–35–11	53	L

April: 4–11–0 (home: 1–6–0; road: 3–5–0)

Game	Date	Visitor	Score	Home	OT	Decision	Attendance	Record	Points	Recap
68	April 2	Toronto	6–3	Philadelphia		Hart	17,097	21–36–11	53	L
69	April 3	Philadelphia	4–3	NY Rangers	SO	Jones	16,005	22–36–11	55	W
70	April 5	Columbus	4–2	Philadelphia		Hart	14,367	22–37–11	55	L
71	April 7	Philadelphia	4–1	Columbus		Jones	17,118	23–37–11	57	W
72	April 9	Anaheim	5–3	Philadelphia		Jones	17,455	23–38–11	57	L
73	April 12	Philadelphia	2–9	Washington		Hart	18,573	23–39–11	57	L
74	April 13	NY Rangers	4–0	Philadelphia		Sandstrom	15,967	23–40–11	57	L
75	April 16	Philadelphia	3–4	Buffalo		Jones	11,046	23–41–11	57	L
76	April 17	Buffalo	5–3	Philadelphia		Sandstrom	14,377	23–42–11	57	L
77	April 19	Philadelphia	2–5	Toronto		Jones	18,291	23–43–11	57	L
78	April 21	Philadelphia	6–3	Montreal		Jones	21,105	24–43–11	59	W
79	April 24	Pittsburgh	1–4	Philadelphia		Jones	18,601	25–43–11	61	W
80	April 25	Philadelphia	1–3	Chicago		Sandstrom	18,642	25–44–11	61	L
81	April 27	Philadelphia	0–4	Winnipeg		Sandstrom	13,383	25–45–11	61	L
82	April 29	Ottawa	4–2	Philadelphia		Jones	17,575	25–46–11	61	L

Legend: W Win (2 points) L Loss (0 points) OTL Overtime/shootout loss (1 point) Postponement

== Player statistics ==
=== Skaters ===
Regular season
Player	GP	G	A	Pts	+/−	PIM
Travis Konecny	79	16	36	52	−23	77
Cam Atkinson	73	23	27	50	−2	10
Claude Giroux^{‡}	57	18	24	42	−12	20
James van Riemsdyk	82	24	14	38	−33	25
Joel Farabee	63	17	17	34	−11	50
Kevin Hayes	48	10	21	31	−20	26
Ivan Provorov	79	9	22	31	−20	34
Travis Sanheim	80	7	24	31	+9	34
Scott Laughton	67	11	19	30	−9	35
Oskar Lindblom	79	12	14	26	−11	22
Keith Yandle	77	1	18	19	−47	14
Sean Couturier	29	6	11	17	−6	14
Derick Brassard^{‡}	31	6	10	16	+6	10
Justin Braun^{‡}	61	5	11	16	+3	36
Morgan Frost	55	5	11	16	−11	14
Rasmus Ristolainen	66	2	14	16	−9	38
Cam York	30	3	7	10	−14	6
Noah Cates	16	5	4	9	+4	4
Patrick Brown	44	4	5	9	−16	11
Zack MacEwen	75	3	6	9	−15	110
Owen Tippett^{†}	21	4	3	7	−4	2
Gerald Mayhew^{‡}	25	6	0	6	−5	10
Max Willman	41	1	4	5	−13	16
Ryan Ellis	4	1	4	5	+2	0
Ronnie Attard	15	2	2	4	−2	8
Isaac Ratcliffe	10	1	3	4	−1	10
Bobby Brink	10	0	4	4	−5	0
Nate Thompson	33	1	2	3	−15	31
Kevin Connauton^{†}	26	1	2	3	−7	2
Nick Seeler	43	1	2	3	−3	29
Hayden Hodgson	6	1	2	3	−1	11
Linus Hogberg	5	0	2	2	0	2
Jackson Cates	11	1	0	1	−2	0
Nicolas Aube-Kubel^{‡}	7	0	1	1	−3	6
Wade Allison	1	0	0	0	−1	0
Connor Bunnaman^{‡}	15	0	0	0	−7	4
Tanner Laczynski	1	0	0	0	−1	0
Egor Zamula	10	0	0	0	−6	4
Linus Sandin	1	0	0	0	0	0

=== Goaltenders ===
Regular season
Player	GP	GS	TOI	W	L	OT	GA	GAA	SA	SV%	SO	G	A	PIM
Carter Hart	45	44	2,603:04	13	24	7	137	3.16	1,441	.905	1	0	1	0
Martin Jones	35	33	1,997:08	12	18	3	114	3.42	1,027	.900	0	0	0	0
Felix Sandstrom	5	5	297:15	0	4	1	16	3.23	177	.910	0	0	0	0

^{†}Denotes player spent time with another team before joining the Flyers. Stats reflect time with the Flyers only.
^{‡}Denotes player was traded mid-season. Stats reflect time with the Flyers only.
Bold/italics denotes franchise record.

== Awards and records ==
=== Awards ===
Type	Award/honor	Recipient	Ref
League (in-season)	NHL All-Star Game selection	Claude Giroux (Note: Giroux was named All-Star Game MVP.)	
League (in-season)	NHL First Star of the Week	Claude Giroux (February 7)	
Team	Barry Ashbee Trophy	Travis Sanheim	
Team	Bobby Clarke Trophy	Cam Atkinson	
Team	Gene Hart Memorial Award	Zack MacEwen	
Team	Pelle Lindbergh Memorial Trophy	Travis Sanheim	
Team	Toyota Cup	Carter Hart	
Team	Yanick Dupre Memorial Class Guy Award	Cam Atkinson	

=== Records ===
The Flyers 4–3 loss to the New York Islanders on January 25 featured two records being broken. It was the final loss in a team record 13-game winless streak, breaking the previous record (12) set in 1999. The game also featured defenseman Keith Yandle breaking Doug Jarvis’ 36-year-old NHL record consecutive games played streak. Yandle’s streak continued until he was a healthy scratch on April 2, ending it at 989 games. Yandle’s –47 plus/minus rating on the season is the worst in team history. The team also set a franchise record for fewest powerplay goals scored (30) and tied the mark for fewest shootouts wins (1).

=== Milestones ===
Milestone	Player	Date	Ref
First game	Max Willman	October 15, 2021	
First game	Felix Sandstrom	December 30, 2021	
First game	Linus Sandin	January 25, 2022	
First game	Isaac Ratcliffe	January 29, 2022	
First game	Hayden Hodgson	March 24, 2022	
First game	Noah Cates	March 29, 2022	
First game	Ronnie Attard	April 2, 2022	
First game	Bobby Brink	April 12, 2022	
First game	Linus Hogberg	April 21, 2022	
600th assist	Claude Giroux	December 29, 2021	
1,000th game played	Claude Giroux	March 17, 2022	

== Transactions ==
The Flyers have been involved in the following transactions during the 2021–22 season.

=== Trades ===
Date	Details		Ref
July 17, 2021	To Nashville Predators Philippe Myers; Nolan Patrick	To Philadelphia Flyers Ryan Ellis	
July 22, 2021	To Arizona Coyotes Shayne Gostisbehere; 2nd-round pick in 2022; STL 7th-round pick in 2022	To Philadelphia Flyers Future considerations	
July 23, 2021	To Buffalo Sabres Robert Hagg; 1st-round pick in 2021; 2nd-round pick in 2023	To Philadelphia Flyers Rasmus Ristolainen	
July 24, 2021	To Columbus Blue Jackets Jakub Voracek	To Philadelphia Flyers Cam Atkinson	
March 19, 2022	To Florida Panthers Claude Giroux; Connor Bunnaman; German Rubtsov; 5th-round pick in 2024	To Philadelphia Flyers Owen Tippett; Conditional^{4} 1st-round pick in 2024; 3rd-round pick in 2023	
March 21, 2022	To New York Rangers Justin Braun	To Philadelphia Flyers 3rd-round pick in 2023	
March 21, 2022	To Edmonton Oilers Derick Brassard	To Philadelphia Flyers 4th-round pick in 2023	
March 23, 2022	To Toronto Maple Leafs Future considerations	To Philadelphia Flyers Brennan Menell	

Notes:

1. Philadelphia will receive Florida's 1st-round pick in 2024 if it falls outside the top 10 selections, otherwise Philadelphia will receive Florida's 1st-round pick in 2025.

=== Players acquired ===
Date	Player	Former team	Term	Via	Ref
July 28, 2021	Adam Clendening	Columbus Blue Jackets	1-year	Free agency	
July 28, 2021	Ryan Fitzgerald	Lehigh Valley Phantoms (AHL)	1-year	Free agency	
July 28, 2021	Martin Jones	San Jose Sharks	1-year	Free agency	
July 28, 2021	Gerald Mayhew	Minnesota Wild	1-year	Free agency	
July 28, 2021	Nick Seeler	Chicago Blackhawks	1-year	Free agency	
July 28, 2021	Nate Thompson	Winnipeg Jets	1-year	Free agency	
July 28, 2021	Keith Yandle	Florida Panthers	1-year	Free agency	
July 28, 2021	Cooper Zech	Providence Bruins (AHL)	2-year	Free agency	
August 25, 2021	Derick Brassard	Arizona Coyotes	1-year	Free agency	
September 22, 2021	Jon-Randall Avon	Peterborough Petes (OHL)	3-year	Free agency	
October 11, 2021	Patrick Brown	Vegas Golden Knights		Waivers	
October 13, 2021	Zack MacEwen	Vancouver Canucks		Waivers	
December 7, 2021	Kevin Connauton	Florida Panthers		Waivers	
March 22, 2021	Hayden Hodgson	Lehigh Valley Phantoms (AHL)	1-year	Free agency	

=== Players lost ===
Date	Player	New team	Term	Via	Ref
July 21, 2021	Carsen Twarynski	Seattle Kraken		Expansion draft	
July 28, 2021	Brian Elliott	Tampa Bay Lightning	1-year	Free agency	
July 31, 2021	Alex Lyon	Carolina Hurricanes	1-year	Free agency	
July 31, 2021	Derrick Pouliot	Henderson Silver Knights (AHL)	1-year	Free agency	
August 12, 2021	Chris Bigras	Wilkes-Barre/Scranton Penguins (AHL)	1-year	Free agency	
August 24, 2021	Pascal Laberge	Maine Mariners (ECHL)	1-year	Free agency	
September 20, 2021	Andy Andreoff	New York Islanders	1-year	Free agency	
October 13, 2021	Tyler Wotherspoon	Utica Comets (AHL)	1-year	Free agency	
November 13, 2021	Nicolas Aube-Kubel	Colorado Avalanche		Waivers	
January 11, 2022	Nate Prosser			Retirement	
March 20, 2022	Gerald Mayhew	Anaheim Ducks		Waivers	
May 3, 2022	Samuel Morin			Retirement	
May 20, 2022	Maksim Sushko	Dynamo Moscow (KHL)	2-year	Free agency	

=== Signings ===
Date	Player	Term	Contract type	Ref
July 26, 2021	Samuel Morin	1-year	Re-signing	
August 9, 2021	Carter Hart	3-year	Re-signing	
August 14, 2021	Samu Tuomaala	3-year	Entry-level	
August 20, 2021	Connor Bunnaman	2-year	Re-signing	
August 21, 2021	Travis Sanheim	2-year	Re-signing	
August 26, 2021	Sean Couturier	8-year	Extension	
September 2, 2021	Joel Farabee	6-year	Extension	
March 10, 2022	Rasmus Ristolainen	5-year	Extension	
March 27, 2022	Noah Cates	2-year	Entry-level	
March 29, 2022	Ronnie Attard	2-year	Entry-level	
April 10, 2022	Bobby Brink	3-year	Entry-level	
May 7, 2022	Ivan Fedotov	1-year	Entry-level	
May 17, 2022	Adam Ginning	2-year	Entry-level	
May 19, 2022	Nick Seeler	2-year	Extension	
May 23, 2022	Linus Sandin	1-year	Extension	

== Draft picks ==
Below are the Philadelphia Flyers' selections at the 2021 NHL entry draft, which were held on July 23 to 24, 2021. It was held virtually via Video conference call from the NHL Network studio in Secaucus, New Jersey.

Round	#	Player	Pos.	Nationality	Team (league)
2	46	Samu Tuomaala	RW	Finland	Karpat U20 (U20 SM-sarja)
3	78	Aleksei Kolosov	G	Belarus	HC Dinamo Minsk (KHL)
4	110	Brian Zanetti	D	Switzerland	HC Lugano U20 (U20-Elit)
5	158	Ty Murchison	D	USA	U.S. NTDP (USHL)
6	174	Ethan Samson	D	Canada	Prince George Cougars (WHL)
7	206	Owen McLaughlin	C	Canada	Mount St. Charles Mounties (USHS-RI)
