= 2021–22 Vancouver Canucks season =

National Hockey League season

2021–22 Vancouver Canucks
- Division: 5th Pacific
- Conference: 10th Western
- 2021–22 record: 40–30–12
- Home record: 20–14–7
- Road record: 20–16–5
- Goals for: 249
- Goals against: 236

Team information
- General manager: Jim Benning (Oct. 13 – Dec. 5); Stan Smyl (interim, Dec. 5 – Dec. 9); Jim Rutherford (interim, Dec. 9 – Jan. 26); Patrik Allvin (Jan. 26 – Apr. 29)
- Coach: Travis Green (Oct. 13 – Dec. 5); Bruce Boudreau (Dec. 5 – Apr. 29)
- Captain: Bo Horvat
- Alternate captains: Oliver Ekman-Larsson; J. T. Miller; Tyler Myers; Brandon Sutter
- Arena: Rogers Arena
- Average attendance: 17,285
- Minor league affiliate: Abbotsford Canucks (AHL)

Team leaders
- Goals: J. T. Miller; Elias Pettersson (32)
- Assists: J. T. Miller (67)
- Points: J. T. Miller (99)
- Penalty minutes: Tyler Myers (66)
- Plus/minus: Conor Garland (+18)
- Wins: Thatcher Demko (33)
- Goals against average: Spencer Martin (1.74)

The 2021–22 Vancouver Canucks season was the 52nd season for the National Hockey League (NHL) franchise that was established on May 22, 1970. The Canucks missed the playoffs for the second straight season, as they were eliminated from playoff contention when the Dallas Stars defeated the Vegas Golden Knights 3–2 in a shootout on April 26, 2022.

On December 5, 2021, the Canucks fired both general manager Jim Benning, and head coach Travis Green following a slow start at 8-15-2. This led to Bruce Boudreau’s being hired as head coach.

== Standings ==
=== Divisional standings ===
Pacific Division
Pos	Team	GP	W	L	OTL	RW	GF	GA	GD	Pts
1	y – Calgary Flames	82	50	21	11	44	293	208	+85	111
2	x – Edmonton Oilers	82	49	27	6	38	290	252	+38	104
3	x – Los Angeles Kings	82	44	27	11	35	239	236	+3	99
4	Vegas Golden Knights	82	43	31	8	34	266	248	+18	94
5	Vancouver Canucks	82	40	30	12	32	249	236	+13	92
6	San Jose Sharks	82	32	37	13	22	214	264	−50	77
7	Anaheim Ducks	82	31	37	14	22	232	271	−39	76
8	Seattle Kraken	82	27	49	6	23	216	285	−69	60

Source: National Hockey League
Rules for classification: 1) Fewer number of games played (GP, only during regular season); 2) Greater number of regulation wins (RW); 3) Greater number of wins in regulation and overtime, excluding shootout wins (ROW); 4) Greater number of total wins, including shootouts (W); 5) Greater number of points earned in head-to-head play; if teams played an uneven number of head-to-head games, the result of the first game on the home ice of the team with the extra home game is discarded; 6) Greater goal differential (GD); 7) Greater number of goals scored (GF)
x – Clinched playoff spot; y – Clinched division

=== Conference standings ===
Western Conference Wild Card
Pos	Div	Team	GP	W	L	OTL	RW	GF	GA	GD	Pts
1	CE	x – Dallas Stars	82	46	30	6	31	238	246	−8	98
2	CE	x – Nashville Predators	82	45	30	7	35	266	252	+14	97
3	PA	Vegas Golden Knights	82	43	31	8	34	266	248	+18	94
4	PA	Vancouver Canucks	82	40	30	12	32	249	236	+13	92
5	CE	Winnipeg Jets	82	39	32	11	32	252	257	−5	89
6	PA	San Jose Sharks	82	32	37	13	22	214	264	−50	77
7	PA	Anaheim Ducks	82	31	37	14	22	232	271	−39	76
8	CE	Chicago Blackhawks	82	28	42	12	16	219	291	−72	68
9	PA	Seattle Kraken	82	27	49	6	23	216	285	−69	60
10	CE	Arizona Coyotes	82	25	50	7	18	207	313	−106	57

Source: National Hockey League
Rules for classification: 1) Fewer number of games played (GP, only during regular season); 2) Greater number of regulation wins (RW); 3) Greater number of wins in regulation and overtime, excluding shootout wins (ROW); 4) Greater number of total wins, including shootouts (W); 5) Greater number of points earned in head-to-head play; if teams played an uneven number of head-to-head games, the result of the first game on the home ice of the team with the extra home game is discarded; 6) Greater goal differential (GD); 7) Greater number of goals scored (GF)
x – Clinched playoff spot

== Schedule and results ==
=== Preseason ===
The Canucks released their pre-season schedule on July 20, 2021.

2021 preseason game log: 2–5–0 (home: 2–2–0; road: 0–3–0)
#	Date	Visitor	Score	Home	OT	Decision	Attendance	Record	Recap
1^{[a]}	September 26	Vancouver	3–5	Seattle		Martin	10,208	0–1–0
2^{[b]}	September 27	Calgary	2–4	Vancouver		DiPietro	—	1–1–0
3	October 1	Vancouver	1–4	Calgary		Demko	14,722	1–2–0
4	October 3	Winnipeg	2–3	Vancouver		DiPietro	9,108	2–2–0
5	October 5	Seattle	4–0	Vancouver		Demko	9,268	2–3–0
6	October 7	Vancouver	2–3	Edmonton		Halak	13,742	2–4–0
7	October 9	Edmonton	3–2	Vancouver		Demko	9,350	2–5–0
Notes:^{a} Game was played at Spokane Arena in Spokane, Washington.^{b} Game was played at Abbotsford Centre in Abbotsford, British Columbia.

=== Regular season ===
The regular season schedule was released on July 22, 2021, with only a handful of games originally scheduled in February because NHL players were planning to participate in the 2022 Winter Olympics. As the result of an outbreak of COVID-19 that affected multiple teams and reduced attendance capacity in Canadian NHL cities, the league pulled out of the Olympics after postponing nearly 100 games in order to finish the regular season by April 29. Most of the postponed games were made up during the initially scheduled Olympic break in February.

2021–22 game log

October: 3–5–1 (home: 0–3–0; road: 3–2–1)
#	Date	Visitor	Score	Home	OT	Decision	Attendance	Record	Pts	Recap
1	October 13	Vancouver	2–3	Edmonton	SO	Demko	16,034	0–0–1	1
2	October 15	Vancouver	5–4	Philadelphia	SO	Demko	19,338	1–0–1	3
3	October 16	Vancouver	1–3	Detroit		Halak	16,274	1–1–1	3
4	October 19	Vancouver	2–5	Buffalo		Demko	7,376	1–2–1	3
5	October 21	Vancouver	4–1	Chicago		Demko	20,490	2–2–1	5
6	October 23	Vancouver	4–2	Seattle		Demko	17,151	3–2–1	7
7	October 26	Minnesota	3–2	Vancouver		Demko	18,870	3–3–1	7
8	October 28	Philadelphia	2–1	Vancouver		Halak	18,344	3–4–1	7
9	October 30	Edmonton	2–1	Vancouver		Demko	18,422	3–5–1	7

November: 4–9–1 (home: 3–3–1; road: 1–6–0)
#	Date	Visitor	Score	Home	OT	Decision	Attendance	Record	Pts	Recap
10	November 2	NY Rangers	2–3	Vancouver	OT	Demko	18,257	4–5–1	9
11	November 5	Nashville	3–2	Vancouver		Demko	18,870	4–6–1	9
12	November 7	Dallas	3–6	Vancouver		Demko	18,661	5–6–1	11
13	November 9	Anaheim	3–2	Vancouver	OT	Halak	18,201	5–6–2	12
14	November 11	Vancouver	1–7	Colorado		Demko	17,226	5–7–2	12
15	November 13	Vancouver	4–7	Vegas		Demko	18,264	5–8–2	12
16	November 14	Vancouver	1–5	Anaheim		Halak	11,892	5–9–2	12
17	November 17	Colorado	4–2	Vancouver		Demko	18,361	5–10–2	12
18	November 19	Winnipeg	2–3	Vancouver		Demko	18,628	6–10–2	14
19	November 21	Chicago	1–0	Vancouver		Demko	18,830	6–11–2	14
20	November 24	Vancouver	1–4	Pittsburgh		Demko	17,590	6–12–2	14
21	November 26	Vancouver	2–4	Columbus		Demko	16,992	6–13–2	14
22	November 28	Vancouver	2–3	Boston		Halak	17,850	6–14–2	14
23	November 29	Vancouver	2–1	Montreal		Demko	20,478	7–14–2	16

December: 8–1–1 (home: 5–1–0; road: 3–0–1)
#	Date	Visitor	Score	Home	OT	Decision	Attendance	Record	Pts	Recap
24	December 1	Vancouver	6–2	Ottawa		Demko	10,571	8–14–2	18
25	December 4	Pittsburgh	4–1	Vancouver		Demko	18,422	8–15–2	18
26	December 6	Los Angeles	0–4	Vancouver		Demko	18,591	9–15–2	20
27	December 8	Boston	1–2	Vancouver	SO	Demko	18,403	10–15–2	22
28	December 10	Winnipeg	3–4	Vancouver	SO	Demko	18,457	11–15–2	24
29	December 12	Carolina	1–2	Vancouver		Demko	18,714	12–15–2	26
30	December 14	Columbus	3–4	Vancouver		Halak	18,412	13–15–2	28
31	December 16	Vancouver	5–2	San Jose		Demko	10,340	14–15–2	30
—	December 18	Toronto	–	Vancouver	Postponed due to COVID-19. Rescheduled for February 12.
—	December 19	Arizona	–	Vancouver	Postponed due to COVID-19. Rescheduled for February 8.
—	December 21	Vancouver	–	San Jose	Postponed due to COVID-19. Rescheduled for February 17.
—	December 23	Anaheim	–	Vancouver	Postponed due to COVID-19. Rescheduled for February 19.
—	December 27	Seattle	–	Vancouver	Postponed due to COVID-19. Rescheduled for February 21.
32	December 29	Vancouver	2–1	Anaheim	OT	Demko	11,866	15–15–2	32
33	December 30	Vancouver	1–2	Los Angeles	SO	Halak	14,514	15–15–3	33

January: 5–4–3 (home: 0–1–2; road: 5–3–1)
#	Date	Visitor	Score	Home	OT	Decision	Attendance	Record	Pts	Recap
34	January 1	Vancouver	5–2	Seattle		Demko	17,151	16–15–3	35
—	January 5	NY Islanders	–	Vancouver	Postponed due to COVID-19. Rescheduled for February 9.
—	January 8	Ottawa	–	Vancouver	Postponed due to COVID-19. Rescheduled for April 19.
35	January 11	Vancouver	2–5	Florida		Demko	15,041	16–16–3	35
36	January 13	Vancouver	2–4	Tampa Bay		Demko	19,092	16–17–3	35
37	January 15	Vancouver	1–4	Carolina		Demko	17,435	16–18–3	35
38	January 16	Vancouver	4–2	Washington		Demko	18,573	17–18–3	37
39	January 18	Vancouver	3–1	Nashville		Demko	16,676	18–18–3	39
40	January 21	Florida	2–1	Vancouver	SO	Martin	9,346	18–18–4	40
41	January 23	St. Louis	3–1	Vancouver		DiPietro	9,424	18–19–4	40
42	January 25	Edmonton	3–2	Vancouver	OT	Martin	9,396	18–19–5	41
43	January 27	Vancouver	5–1	Winnipeg		Martin	250	19–19–5	43
44	January 29	Vancouver	0–1	Calgary	OT	Demko	9,639	19–19–6	44
45	January 31	Vancouver	3–1	Chicago		Halak	17,170	20–19–6	46

February: 6–4–0 (home: 4–2–0; road: 2–2–0)
#	Date	Visitor	Score	Home	OT	Decision	Attendance	Record	Pts	Recap
46	February 1	Vancouver	2–4	Nashville		Demko	17,159	20–20–6	46
47	February 8	Arizona	1–5	Vancouver		Demko	9,124	21–20–6	48
48	February 9	NY Islanders	6–3	Vancouver		Halak	9,268	21–21–6	48
49	February 12	Toronto	2–3	Vancouver		Demko	9,396	22–21–6	50
50	February 17	Vancouver	5–4	San Jose	OT	Demko	10,608	23–21–6	52
51	February 19	Anaheim	7–4	Vancouver		Demko	18,932	23–22–6	52
52	February 21	Seattle	2–5	Vancouver		Demko	18,346	24–22–6	54
53	February 24	Calgary	1–7	Vancouver		Demko	18,857	25–22–6	56
54	February 27	Vancouver	5–2	NY Rangers		Demko	16,483	26–22–6	58
55	February 28	Vancouver	2–7	New Jersey		Halak	11,693	26–23–6	58

March: 6–5–3 (home: 2–4–2; road: 4–1–1)
#	Date	Visitor	Score	Home	OT	Decision	Attendance	Record	Pts	Recap
56	March 3	Vancouver	4–3	NY Islanders		Demko	16,412	27–23–6	60
57	March 5	Vancouver	6–4	Toronto		Demko	17,534	28–23–6	62
58	March 9	Montreal	3–5	Vancouver		Demko	18,645	29–23–6	64
59	March 11	Washington	4–3	Vancouver	OT	Demko	18,814	29–23–7	65
60	March 13	Tampa Bay	2–1	Vancouver		Demko	18,760	29–24–7	65
61	March 15	New Jersey	3–6	Vancouver		Demko	18,562	30–24–7	67
62	March 17	Detroit	1–0	Vancouver		Demko	18,893	30–25–7	67
63	March 19	Calgary	5–2	Vancouver		Demko	18,865	30–26–7	67
64	March 20	Buffalo	3–2	Vancouver	OT	Demko	18,873	30–26–8	68
65	March 23	Vancouver	3–1	Colorado		Halak	17,482	31–26–8	70
66	March 24	Vancouver	2–3	Minnesota	OT	Demko	17,333	31–26–9	71
67	March 26	Vancouver	4–1	Dallas		Demko	18,532	32–26–9	73
68	March 28	Vancouver	1–4	St. Louis		Halak	18,096	32–27–9	73
69	March 30	St. Louis	4–3	Vancouver		Demko	18,809	32–28–9	73

April: 8–2–3 (home: 6–0–1; road: 2–2–1)
#	Date	Visitor	Score	Home	OT	Decision	Attendance	Record	Pts	Recap
70	April 3	Vegas	3–2	Vancouver	OT	Demko	18,969	32–28–10	74
71	April 6	Vancouver	5–1	Vegas		Demko	18,113	33–28–10	76
72	April 7	Vancouver	5–1	Arizona		Halak	9,679	34–28–10	78
73	April 9	San Jose	2–4	Vancouver		Demko	18,607	35–28–10	80
74	April 12	Vegas	4–5	Vancouver	OT	Demko	18,717	36–28–10	82
75	April 14	Arizona	1–7	Vancouver		Demko	18,890	37–28–10	84
76	April 18	Dallas	2–6	Vancouver		Demko	18,826	38–28–10	86
77	April 19	Ottawa	4–3	Vancouver	SO	Demko	18,845	38–28–11	87
78	April 21	Vancouver	3–6	Minnesota		Demko	17,894	38–29–11	87
79	April 23	Vancouver	3–6	Calgary		Demko	17,533	38–30–11	87
80	April 26	Seattle	2–5	Vancouver		Martin	18,261	39–30–11	89
81	April 28	Los Angeles	2–3	Vancouver	OT	Martin	18,779	40–30–11	91
82	April 29	Vancouver	2–3	Edmonton	SO	Martin	18,347	40–30–12	92

Legend: Win (2 points) Loss (0 points) Overtime/shootout loss (1 point)

== Player statistics ==
=== Skaters ===
Regular season
Player	GP	G	A	Pts	+/−	PIM
J. T. Miller	80	32	67	99	+15	47
Elias Pettersson	80	32	36	68	+1	12
Quinn Hughes	76	8	60	68	+10	28
Bo Horvat	70	31	21	52	+3	40
Conor Garland	77	19	33	52	+18	36
Brock Boeser	71	23	23	46	−5	20
Tanner Pearson	68	14	20	34	+9	30
Oliver Ekman-Larsson	79	5	24	29	+5	52
Vasily Podkolzin	79	14	12	26	+7	26
Alex Chiasson	67	13	9	22	+5	24
Nils Hoglander	60	10	8	18	−7	24
Tyler Myers	82	1	17	18	+15	66
Luke Schenn	66	5	12	17	+15	61
Brad Hunt	50	3	14	17	−3	12
Tyler Motte^{‡}	49	7	8	15	+3	22
Juho Lammikko	75	7	8	15	−6	14
Matthew Highmore	46	5	7	12	+1	14
Jason Dickinson	62	5	6	11	−1	19
Travis Hamonic^{‡}	24	3	4	7	+1	6
Kyle Burroughs	42	1	4	5	−3	39
Brad Richardson^{†}	17	2	2	4	+1	8
Justin Dowling	22	2	2	4	−3	2
Sheldon Dries	11	2	1	3	−3	0
Tucker Poolman	40	1	2	3	+2	12
Travis Dermott^{†}	17	1	1	2	+5	0
Nic Petan	18	0	2	2	−2	4
Noah Juulsen	8	0	2	2	−4	0
Guillaume Brisebois	1	0	0	0	−1	0
Sheldon Rempal	1	0	0	0	−1	0
Madison Bowey	2	0	0	0	−3	0
Will Lockwood	13	0	0	0	−3	9
Jack Rathbone	9	0	0	0	−5	2
Justin Bailey	14	0	0	0	−5	6

=== Goaltenders ===
Regular season
Player	GP	GS	TOI	W	L	OT	GA	GAA	SA	SV%	SO	G	A	PIM
Thatcher Demko	64	61	3,700:39	33	22	7	168	2.72	1,967	.915	1	0	2	2
Jaroslav Halak	17	14	796:42	4	7	2	39	2.94	400	.903	0	0	0	2
Spencer Martin	6	6	378:21	3	0	3	11	1.74	218	.950	0	0	0	0
Michael DiPietro	1	1	57:21	0	1	0	3	3.14	17	.824	0	0	0	0

^{†}Denotes player spent time with another team before joining the Canucks. Stats reflect time with the Canucks only.
^{‡}Denotes player was traded mid-season. Stats reflect time with the Canucks only.
Bold/italics denotes franchise record.

== Awards and honours ==
=== Awards ===
Regular season
Player	Award	Awarded
Thatcher Demko	NHL First Star of the Week	December 13, 2021
Thatcher Demko	NHL Third Star of the Month	January 2, 2022
Thatcher Demko	NHL All-Star game selection	January 13, 2022

=== Milestones ===
Regular season
Player	Milestone	Reached
Vasily Podkolzin	1st career NHL game	October 13, 2021
Vasily Podkolzin	1st career NHL goal 1st career NHL point	October 15, 2021
Conor Garland	100th career NHL point	October 19, 2021
Quinn Hughes	100th career NHL point	October 21, 2021
Luke Schenn	800th career NHL game	October 30, 2021
Brock Boeser	100th career NHL goal	October 30, 2021
Juho Lammikko	100th career NHL game	November 14, 2021
Quinn Hughes	100th career NHL assist	November 14, 2021
Vasily Podkolzin	1st career NHL assist	November 19, 2021
Kyle Burroughs	1st career NHL goal	November 19, 2021
Matthew Highmore	100th career NHL game	December 30, 2021
Oliver Ekman-Larsson	800th career NHL game	January 1, 2022
Elias Pettersson	200th career NHL game	January 11, 2022
Brad Hunt	200th career NHL game	January 11, 2022
Thatcher Demko	100th career NHL game	January 11, 2022
Conor Garland	200th career NHL game	January 13, 2022
Elias Pettersson	100th career NHL assist	January 23, 2022
Tyler Myers	800th career NHL game	January 25, 2022
Spencer Martin	1st career NHL win	January 27, 2022
Nils Hoglander	100th career NHL game	January 29, 2022
Alex Chiasson	600th career NHL game	January 31, 2022
J.T. Miller	600th career NHL game	January 31, 2022
Oliver Ekman-Larsson	400th career NHL point	February 8, 2022
J.T. Miller	400th career NHL point	February 8, 2022
Travis Hamonic	200th career NHL point	February 21, 2022
Brock Boeser	300th career NHL game	February 24, 2022
Elias Pettersson	200th career NHL point	March 26, 2022
Quinn Hughes	200th career NHL game	April 19, 2022

=== Records ===
Player	Record	Date
Quinn Hughes	Most assists by Canucks defenceman in single season	April 23, 2022
Quinn Hughes	Most points by Canucks defenceman in single season	April 26, 2022

== Transactions ==
The Canucks have been involved in the following transactions during the 2021–22 season.

=== Trades ===
Date	Details		Ref
July 23, 2021	To Arizona Coyotes Loui Eriksson; Antoine Roussel; Jay Beagle; 1st-round pick in 2021; 2nd-round pick in 2022; 7th-round pick in 2023	To Vancouver Canucks Oliver Ekman-Larsson; Conor Garland	
July 27, 2021	To Winnipeg Jets Nate Schmidt	To Vancouver Canucks 3rd-round pick in 2022	
July 31, 2021	To Tampa Bay Lightning Future considerations	To Vancouver Canucks Spencer Martin	
October 10, 2021	To Florida Panthers Olli Juolevi	To Vancouver Canucks Noah Juulsen; Juho Lammikko	
March 20, 2022	To Ottawa Senators Travis Hamonic	To Vancouver Canucks 3rd-round pick in 2022	
March 20, 2022	To Toronto Maple Leafs 3rd-round pick in 2022	To Vancouver Canucks Travis Dermott	
March 20, 2022	To New York Rangers Tyler Motte	To Vancouver Canucks 4th-round pick in 2023	

=== Players acquired ===
Date	Player	Former team	Term	Via	Ref
July 28, 2021	Kyle Burroughs	Colorado Avalanche	2-year	Free agency	
July 28, 2021	Phillip Di Giuseppe	New York Rangers	1-year	Free agency	
July 28, 2021	Justin Dowling	Dallas Stars	2-year	Free agency	
July 28, 2021	Sheldon Dries	Colorado Avalanche	1-year	Free agency	
July 28, 2021	Jaroslav Halak	Boston Bruins	1-year	Free agency	
July 28, 2021	Brad Hunt	Minnesota Wild	1-year	Free agency	
July 28, 2021	Brady Keeper	Florida Panthers	2-year	Free agency	
July 28, 2021	Nic Petan	Toronto Maple Leafs	1-year	Free agency	
July 28, 2021	Tucker Poolman	Winnipeg Jets	4-year	Free agency	
July 28, 2021	Sheldon Rempal	Carolina Hurricanes	1-year	Free agency	
July 28, 2021	Luke Schenn	Tampa Bay Lightning	2-year	Free agency	
July 28, 2021	Devante Stephens	Syracuse Crunch (AHL)	1-year	Free agency	
July 28, 2021	John Stevens	Utica Comets (AHL)	1-year	Free agency	
October 12, 2021	Alex Chiasson	Edmonton Oilers	1-year	Free agency	
December 18, 2021	Ashton Sautner	Abbotsford Canucks (AHL)	1-year	Free agency	
March 11, 2022	Arshdeep Bains	Red Deer Rebels (WHL)	3-year	Free agency	
March 21, 2022	Brad Richardson	Calgary Flames		Waivers	
June 7, 2022	Nils Aman	Leksands IF (SHL)	2-year	Free agency	
June 13, 2022	Filip Johansson	Frölunda HC (SHL)	2-year	Free agency	

=== Players lost ===
Date	Player	New team	Term	Via	Ref
July 21, 2021	Kole Lind	Seattle Kraken		Expansion draft	
July 25, 2021	Jake Virtanen	Spartak Moscow (KHL)	1-year	Buy-out	
July 26, 2021	Tyler Graovac	Dinamo Minsk (KHL)	1-year	Free agency	
July 27, 2021	Braden Holtby	Dallas Stars	1-year	Buy-out	
July 28, 2021	Sven Baertschi	Vegas Golden Knights	1-year	Free agency	
July 28, 2021	Alexander Edler	Los Angeles Kings	1-year	Free agency	
July 29, 2021	Brogan Rafferty	Anaheim Ducks	1-year	Free agency	
July 30, 2021	Jalen Chatfield	Carolina Hurricanes	1-year	Free agency	
August 3, 2021	Travis Boyd	Arizona Coyotes	1-year	Free agency	
August 6, 2021	Josh Teves	Rochester Americans (AHL)	1-year	Free agency	
August 13, 2021	Ashton Sautner	Abbotsford Canucks (AHL)	1-year	Free agency	
August 18, 2021	Mitch Eliot	Rochester Americans (AHL)	1-year	Free agency	
August 18, 2021	Marc Michaelis	Toronto Marlies (AHL)	1-year	Free agency	
September 3, 2021	Jayce Hawryluk	Skelleftea AIK (SHL)	1-year	Free agency	
October 7, 2021	Jonah Gadjovich	San Jose Sharks		Waivers	
October 10, 2021	Jimmy Vesey	New Jersey Devils	1-year	Free agency	
October 13, 2021	Zack MacEwen	Philadelphia Flyers		Waivers	

=== Signings ===
Date	Player	Term	Contract type	Ref
July 27, 2021	Conor Garland	5-year	Re-signing	
July 28, 2021	Justin Bailey	1-year	Re-signing	
July 28, 2021	Travis Hamonic	2-year	Re-signing	
July 28, 2021	Danila Klimovich	3-year	Entry-level	
July 28, 2021	Brandon Sutter	1-year	Re-signing	
August 9, 2021	Olli Juolevi	1-year	Re-signing	
August 12, 2021	Guillaume Brisebois	1-year	Re-signing	
August 14, 2021	Jason Dickinson	3-year	Re-signing	
October 3, 2021	Quinn Hughes	6-year	Re-signing	
October 3, 2021	Elias Pettersson	3-year	Re-signing	
April 8, 2022	Spencer Martin	2-year	Re-signing	
May 26, 2022	Linus Karlsson	2-year	Entry-level	
June 27, 2022	Guillaume Brisebois	1-year	Extension	
June 27, 2022	Sheldon Dries	2-year	Extension	
June 27, 2022	John Stevens	1-year	Extension	
July 1, 2022	Brock Boeser	3-year	Extension	
July 1, 2022	Noah Juulsen	1-year	Extension	
July 1, 2022	William Lockwood	1-year	Extension	
July 1, 2022	Jack Rathbone	1-year	Extension	

== Draft picks ==
Below are the Vancouver Canucks' selections at the 2021 NHL entry draft, which will be held virtually via video conference call on July 23 and 24, 2021 from the NHL Network studios in Secaucus, New Jersey, due to the COVID-19 pandemic.

Round	#	Player	Pos	Nationality	College/Junior/Club team (League)
2	41	Danila Klimovich	C	Belarus	Minskie Zubry (Vysshaya Liga)
5	137	Aku Koskenvuo	G	Finland	HIFK Hockey (U20 SM-sarja)
5	140	Jonathan Myrenberg	D	Sweden	Sollentuna HC (Hockeyettan)
6	169	Hugo Gabrielson	D	Sweden	Halmstad Hammers HC (Hockeyettan)
6	178	Connor Lockhart	C	Canada	Erie Otters (OHL)
7	201	Lucas Forsell	LW	Sweden	Färjestad BK (J20 SuperElit)
