= Markus Niemeläinen =

Finnish professional ice hockey defenceman

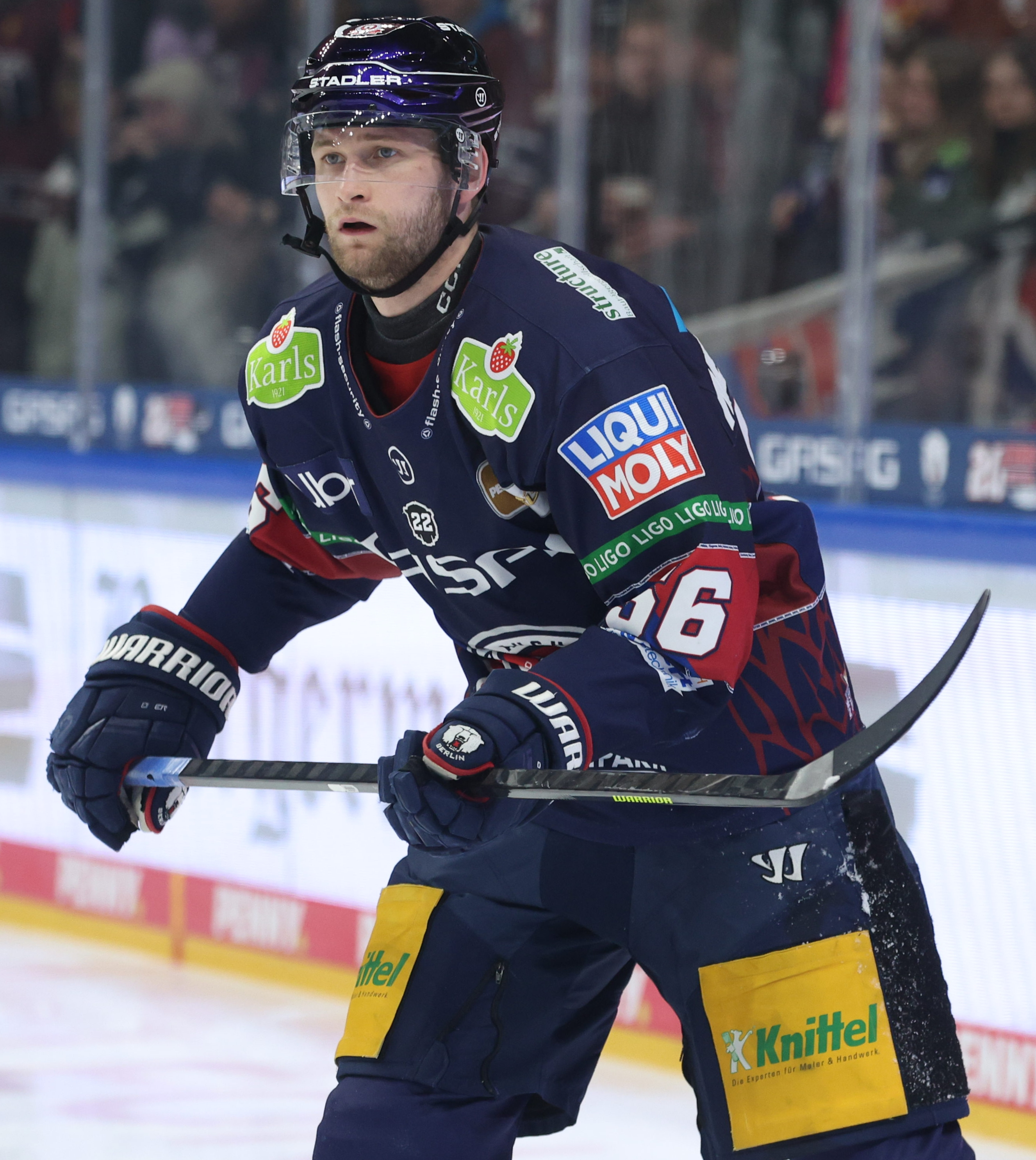
- Niemeläinen in 2025
- Born: 8 June 1998 (age 28) Kuopio, Finland
- Height: 6 ft 6 in (198 cm)
- Weight: 190 lb (86 kg; 13 st 8 lb)
- Position: Defence
- Shoots: Left
- DEL team Former teams: Eisbären Berlin; HPK; Ässät; Edmonton Oilers
- NHL draft: 63rd overall, 2016; Edmonton Oilers
- Playing career: 2017–present

Markus Niemeläinen (born 8 June 1998) is a Finnish professional ice hockey defenceman who currently plays for Eisbären Berlin in the Deutsche Eishockey Liga (DEL). He previously played for the Edmonton Oilers of the National Hockey League (NHL). He was selected by the Oilers in the third round, 63rd overall, of the 2016 NHL entry draft.

== Playing career ==
Niemeläinen began playing hockey in the junior teams of HPK and Tappara in his native Finland. He was then drafted to play for the Saginaw Spirit of the Ontario Hockey League in 2015 where he posted 26 assists in his first season. He was drafted 63rd overall by the Edmonton Oilers in the 2016 NHL entry draft but was not signed to a contract and after a second season in Saginaw, Niemeläinen rejoined HPK in 2017.

On 30 April 2020, Niemeläinen signed a two-year entry-level contract with the Edmonton Oilers of the National Hockey League.

On September 12, 2024, Niemeläinen signed a one-year contract with Eisbären Berlin of the Deutsche Eishockey Liga (DEL).

== Career statistics ==
=== Regular season and playoffs ===
			Regular season					Playoffs
Season	Team	League	GP	G	A	Pts	PIM	GP	G	A	Pts	PIM
2014–15	HPK	Jr. A	39	2	14	16	28	12	0	5	5	4
2015–16	Saginaw Spirit	OHL	65	1	26	27	28	4	0	0	0	0
2016–17	Saginaw Spirit	OHL	59	3	6	9	40	—	—	—	—	—
2017–18	HPK	Liiga	42	1	2	3	24	—	—	—	—	—
2017–18	LeKi	Mestis	1	0	0	0	0	—	—	—	—	—
2017–18	HPK	Jr. A	—	—	—	—	—	5	0	0	0	2
2018–19	HPK	Liiga	50	1	4	5	8	18	0	2	2	4
2019–20	Ässät	Liiga	55	1	6	7	42	—	—	—	—	—
2020–21	Ässät	Liiga	14	0	3	3	35	—	—	—	—	—
2020–21	Bakersfield Condors	AHL	21	2	4	6	6	—	—	—	—	—
2021–22	Bakersfield Condors	AHL	34	2	6	8	12	3	0	0	0	0
2021–22	Edmonton Oilers	NHL	20	0	1	1	4	—	—	—	—	—
2022–23	Edmonton Oilers	NHL	23	0	0	0	4	—	—	—	—	—
2022–23	Bakersfield Condors	AHL	30	2	5	7	18	2	0	0	0	0
2023–24	Bakersfield Condors	AHL	35	1	4	5	18	2	0	0	0	0
2024–25	Eisbären Berlin	DEL	40	1	6	7	35	3	0	0	0	4
Liiga totals			161	3	16	19	109	18	0	2	2	4
NHL totals			43	0	1	1	8	—	—	—	—	—
DEL totals			40	1	6	7	35	3	0	0	0	4

Medal record

Representing Finland

Ice hockey

World U18 Championships
Gold medal – first place	2016 United States	
Silver medal – second place	2015 Switzerland	

=== International ===
Year	Team	Event	Result	GP	G	A	Pts	PIM
2014	Finland	U17	4th	6	1	0	1	2
2015	Finland	U18	2nd place, silver medalist(s)	7	0	0	0	0
2016	Finland	U18	1st place, gold medalist(s)	7	0	1	1	6
Junior totals				20	1	1	2	8

== Awards & honors ==
Award	Year
Liiga
Champion (HPK)	2019
DEL
Champion (Eisbären Berlin)	2025, 2026
