= Caleb Jones (ice hockey) =

American ice hockey player (born 1997)

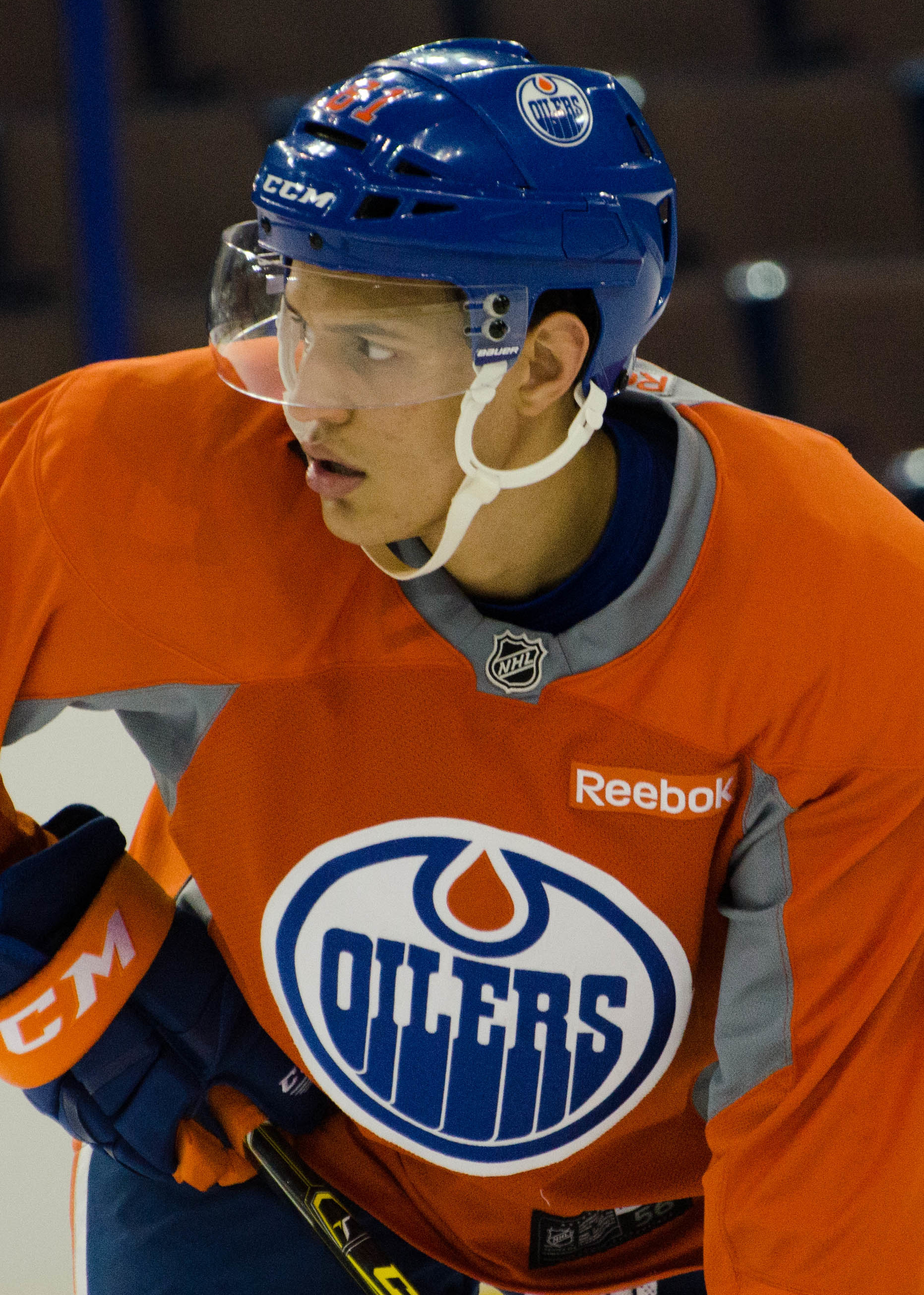
- Jones with the Edmonton Oilers in 2015
- Born: June 6, 1997 (age 29) Arlington, Texas, U.S.
- Height: 6 ft 1 in (185 cm)
- Weight: 184 lb (83 kg; 13 st 2 lb)
- Position: Defense
- Shoots: Left
- NHL team (P) Cur. team Former teams: Buffalo Sabres; Rochester Americans (AHL); Edmonton Oilers; Chicago Blackhawks; Colorado Avalanche; Los Angeles Kings; Pittsburgh Penguins
- NHL draft: 117th overall, 2015; Edmonton Oilers
- Playing career: 2016–present

Caleb Jay Jones (born June 6, 1997) is an American professional ice hockey player who is a defenseman for the Rochester Americans of the American Hockey League (AHL) while under contract to the Buffalo Sabres of the National Hockey League (NHL). He was drafted 117th overall by the Edmonton Oilers in the 2015 NHL entry draft. Jones has previously played for the Oilers, Chicago Blackhawks, Colorado Avalanche, Los Angeles Kings, and Pittsburgh Penguins.

== Playing career ==
Jones played junior hockey for the Portland Winterhawks of the Western Hockey League (WHL) and the United States National Team Development Program in the United States Hockey League (USHL). He was selected in the 2015 NHL Draft in the 4th round by the Edmonton Oilers and signed an entry-level contract with them on April 7, 2016.

Jones continued with the Winterhawks for the 2015–16 and 2016–17 seasons, though he did get called up for three games with the Oilers' farm team, the Bakersfield Condors of the American Hockey League (AHL), in 2015–16. Jones played the full 2017–18 season with the Condors, returning to their lineup for the 2018–19 season. Jones was called up by the Oilers on December 12, 2018, following an injury to Oscar Klefbom. He made his NHL debut on December 14 against the Philadelphia Flyers.

On July 12, 2021, Jones was traded by the Oilers to the Chicago Blackhawks, along with a conditional third-round pick in 2022, in exchange for Duncan Keith and Tim Söderlund.

After becoming an unrestricted free agent following the 2022–23 NHL season, Jones left the Blackhawks and was signed to a one-year, $775,000 contract with the Carolina Hurricanes on August 10, 2023. Before playing a regular-season game for Carolina, however, Jones was traded to the Colorado Avalanche on October 10, in exchange for Callahan Burke. Due to Carolina's lack of an AHL affiliate for the 2023–24 season, Jones had already been assigned to the Avalanche's AHL affiliate Colorado Eagles the day before the trade.

After a lone season with the Avalanche, Jones left the club as a free agent and was signed to a one-year, two-way contract for the 2024–25 season with the Los Angeles Kings on July 5, 2024. Jones began the season with the Kings, going scoreless through 6 appearances, before splitting the season with AHL, affiliate the Ontario Reign.

As a free agent at the conclusion of his contract with the Kings, Jones was signed to a two-year, $1.8 million contract with the Pittsburgh Penguins on July 1, 2025.

Jones was suspended for 20 games without pay on February 4, 2026, for violating the NHL and NHLPA Performance Enhancing Substances Program. Jones was serving on the Penguins' roster and injured reserve at the time of the announcement, having also played for their AHL affiliate, the Wilkes-Barre/Scranton Penguins.

On October 12, 2026, Jones was traded by the Penguins to the Buffalo Sabres, along with Daniel Laatsch in exchange for Ryan Johnson.

== Personal life ==
His older brother, also a defenseman, is Seth Jones. His father is former NBA player Popeye Jones, and was born in Arlington when his father was a member of the Dallas Mavericks.

Jones married his wife, Lexi Lundgren, in July 2025.

== Career statistics ==
=== Regular season and playoffs ===
			Regular season					Playoffs
Season	Team	League	GP	G	A	Pts	PIM	GP	G	A	Pts	PIM
2013–14	U.S. NTDP Juniors	USHL	33	0	7	7	54	—	—	—	—	—
2013–14	U.S. NTDP U17	USDP	52	1	14	15	90	—	—	—	—	—
2014–15	U.S. NTDP Juniors	USHL	25	2	6	8	28	—	—	—	—	—
2014–15	U.S. NTDP U18	USDP	65	6	19	25	50	—	—	—	—	—
2015–16	Portland Winterhawks	WHL	72	10	45	55	64	4	0	2	2	6
2015–16	Bakersfield Condors	AHL	3	0	0	0	2	—	—	—	—	—
2016–17	Portland Winterhawks	WHL	63	9	53	62	54	11	2	8	10	28
2017–18	Bakersfield Condors	AHL	58	2	15	17	43	—	—	—	—	—
2018–19	Bakersfield Condors	AHL	50	6	23	29	28	10	0	3	3	6
2018–19	Edmonton Oilers	NHL	17	1	5	6	6	—	—	—	—	—
2019–20	Bakersfield Condors	AHL	14	3	8	11	4	—	—	—	—	—
2019–20	Edmonton Oilers	NHL	43	4	5	9	10	2	0	0	0	0
2020–21	Edmonton Oilers	NHL	33	0	4	4	6	—	—	—	—	—
2021–22	Chicago Blackhawks	NHL	51	5	10	15	18	—	—	—	—	—
2022–23	Chicago Blackhawks	NHL	73	4	12	16	40	—	—	—	—	—
2023–24	Colorado Eagles	AHL	12	0	6	6	8	—	—	—	—	—
2023–24	Colorado Avalanche	NHL	25	0	5	5	8	3	0	0	0	6
2024–25	Los Angeles Kings	NHL	6	0	0	0	2	—	—	—	—	—
2024–25	Ontario Reign	AHL	44	2	19	21	20	2	0	1	1	2
2025–26	Pittsburgh Penguins	NHL	7	0	1	1	0	—	—	—	—	—
2025–26	Wilkes-Barre/Scranton Penguins	AHL	1	0	0	0	0	—	—	—	—	—
2026–27	Wilkes-Barre/Scranton Penguins	AHL	4	0	3	3	0	—	—	—	—	—
NHL totals			255	14	42	56	90	5	0	0	0	6

=== International ===
Year	Team	Event	Result	GP	G	A	Pts	PIM
2014	United States	U17	1st place, gold medalist(s)	6	0	3	3	4
2015	United States	U18	1st place, gold medalist(s)	7	0	5	5	0
2017	United States	WJC	1st place, gold medalist(s)	7	0	2	2	2
Junior totals				20	0	10	10	6
