= 2021–22 Buffalo Sabres season =

Professional ice hockey team season

2021–22 Buffalo Sabres
- Division: 5th Atlantic
- Conference: 11th Eastern
- 2021–22 record: 32–39–11
- Home record: 17–18–6
- Road record: 15–21–5
- Goals for: 232
- Goals against: 290

Team information
- General manager: Kevyn Adams
- Coach: Don Granato
- Captain: Vacant
- Alternate captains: Zemgus Girgensons; Kyle Okposo; Rotating
- Arena: KeyBank Center
- Average attendance: 9,997
- Minor league affiliates: Rochester Americans (AHL); Cincinnati Cyclones (ECHL)

Team leaders
- Goals: Tage Thompson (38)
- Assists: Rasmus Dahlin (40)
- Points: Tage Thompson (68)
- Penalty minutes: John Hayden (84)
- Plus/minus: Owen Power (+3)
- Wins: Craig Anderson (17)
- Goals against average: Michael Houser (2.00)

The 2021–22 Buffalo Sabres season was the 52nd season for the National Hockey League (NHL) franchise that was established on May 22, 1970. The Sabres failed to snap their ten-year playoff drought, having last qualified for the playoffs in the 2010–11 season.

The league returned to its normal October-to-April scheduling, a full 82-game regular season which began on October 12, 2021, but this was contingent on the COVID-19 pandemic and the Government of Canada reducing its COVID-19 cross-border travel restrictions. As a result, the Sabres rejoined the Atlantic Division after a one-season stint in the East Division due to realignment under the league's return to play protocols. On April 6, 2022, after the Washington Capitals defeated the Tampa Bay Lightning, the Sabres were eliminated from playoff contention for the 11th straight season, setting an NHL record.

== Standings ==
=== Divisional standings ===
Atlantic Division
Pos	Team	GP	W	L	OTL	RW	GF	GA	GD	Pts
1	p – Florida Panthers	82	58	18	6	42	340	246	+94	122
2	x – Toronto Maple Leafs	82	54	21	7	45	315	253	+62	115
3	x – Tampa Bay Lightning	82	51	23	8	39	287	233	+54	110
4	x – Boston Bruins	82	51	26	5	40	255	220	+35	107
5	Buffalo Sabres	82	32	39	11	25	232	290	−58	75
6	Detroit Red Wings	82	32	40	10	21	230	312	−82	74
7	Ottawa Senators	82	33	42	7	26	227	266	−39	73
8	Montreal Canadiens	82	22	49	11	16	221	319	−98	55

Source: National Hockey League
Rules for classification: 1) Fewer number of games played (GP, only during regular season); 2) Greater number of regulation wins (RW); 3) Greater number of wins in regulation and overtime, excluding shootout wins (ROW); 4) Greater number of total wins, including shootouts (W); 5) Greater number of points earned in head-to-head play; if teams played an uneven number of head-to-head games, the result of the first game on the home ice of the team with the extra home game is discarded; 6) Greater goal differential (GD); 7) Greater number of goals scored (GF)
p – Clinched Presidents' Trophy; x – Clinched playoff spot

=== Eastern Conference ===
Eastern Conference Wild Card
Pos	Div	Team	GP	W	L	OTL	RW	GF	GA	GD	Pts
1	AT	x – Boston Bruins	82	51	26	5	40	255	220	+35	107
2	ME	x – Washington Capitals	82	44	26	12	35	275	245	+30	100
3	ME	New York Islanders	82	37	35	10	34	231	237	−6	84
4	ME	Columbus Blue Jackets	82	37	38	7	26	262	300	−38	81
5	AT	Buffalo Sabres	82	32	39	11	25	232	290	−58	75
6	AT	Detroit Red Wings	82	32	40	10	21	230	312	−82	74
7	AT	Ottawa Senators	82	33	42	7	26	227	266	−39	73
8	ME	New Jersey Devils	82	27	46	9	19	248	307	−59	63
9	ME	Philadelphia Flyers	82	25	46	11	20	211	298	−87	61
10	AT	Montreal Canadiens	82	22	49	11	16	221	319	−98	55

Source: National Hockey League
Rules for classification: 1) Fewer number of games played (GP, only during regular season); 2) Greater number of regulation wins (RW); 3) Greater number of wins in regulation and overtime, excluding shootout wins (ROW); 4) Greater number of total wins, including shootouts (W); 5) Greater number of points earned in head-to-head play; if teams played an uneven number of head-to-head games, the result of the first game on the home ice of the team with the extra home game is discarded; 6) Greater goal differential (GD); 7) Greater number of goals scored (GF)
x – Clinched playoff spot

== Schedule and results ==
=== Regular season ===
The regular season schedule was published on July 22, 2021.

2021–22 game log

October: 5–2–1 (home: 4–1–0; road: 1–1–1)
#	Date	Visitor	Score	Home	OT	Decision	Attendance	Record	Pts	Recap
1	October 14	Montreal	1–5	Buffalo		Anderson	8,467	1–0–0	2
2	October 16	Arizona	1–2	Buffalo	SO	Tokarski	7,872	2–0–0	4
3	October 19	Vancouver	2–5	Buffalo		Anderson	7,376	3–0–0	6
4	October 22	Boston	4–1	Buffalo		Anderson	7,820	3–1–0	6
5	October 23	Buffalo	1–2	New Jersey	OT	Tokarski	13,158	3–1–1	7
6	October 25	Tampa Bay	1–5	Buffalo		Anderson	7,417	4–1–1	9
7	October 28	Buffalo	4–3	Anaheim	OT	Anderson	12,014	5–1–1	11
8	October 31	Buffalo	2–3	Los Angeles		Tokarski	12,101	5–2–1	11

November: 3–9–2 (home: 2–5–1; road: 1–4–1)
#	Date	Visitor	Score	Home	OT	Decision	Attendance	Record	Pts	Recap
9	November 2	Buffalo	3–5	San Jose		Anderson	10,059	5–3–1	11
10	November 4	Buffalo	2–5	Seattle		Tokarski	17,151	5–4–1	11
11	November 6	Detroit	4–3	Buffalo	OT	Tokarski	8,171	5–4–2	12
12	November 8	Buffalo	3–5	Washington		Tokarski	18,573	5–5–2	12
13	November 12	Edmonton	2–3	Buffalo		Tokarski	8,258	6–5–2	14
14	November 13	Toronto	5–4	Buffalo		Dell	7,992	6–6–2	14
15	November 16	Buffalo	2–1	Pittsburgh		Tokarski	16,366	7–6–2	16
16	November 18	Calgary	5–0	Buffalo		Tokarski	7,753	7–7–2	16
17	November 21	Buffalo	4–5	NY Rangers		Dell	17,256	7–8–2	16
18	November 22	Columbus	7–4	Buffalo		Dell	7,978	7–9–2	16
19	November 24	Boston	5–1	Buffalo		Dell	9,416	7–10–2	16
20	November 26	Montreal	1–4	Buffalo		Tokarski	9,958	8–10–2	18
21	November 27	Buffalo	2–3	Detroit	OT	Tokarski	18,050	8–10–3	19
22	November 29	Seattle	7–4	Buffalo		Tokarski	10,004	8–11–3	19

December: 2–6–2 (home: 0–3–1; road: 2–3–1)
#	Date	Visitor	Score	Home	OT	Decision	Attendance	Record	Pts	Recap
23	December 2	Buffalo	4–7	Florida		Dell	11,751	8–12–3	19
24	December 4	Buffalo	2–6	Carolina		Subban	18,680	8–13–3	19
25	December 7	Anaheim	2–0	Buffalo		Luukkonen	8,133	8–14–3	19
26	December 10	NY Rangers	2–1	Buffalo		Luukkonen	9,703	8–15–3	19
27	December 11	Washington	3–2	Buffalo	SO	Luukkonen	9,554	8–15–4	20
28	December 14	Buffalo	4–2	Winnipeg		Luukkonen	13,484	9–15–4	22
29	December 16	Buffalo	3–2	Minnesota	SO	Luukkonen	18,022	10–15–4	24
30	December 17	Buffalo	2–3	Pittsburgh	OT	Subban	17,456	10–15–5	25
–	December 20	Columbus	–	Buffalo	Postponed due to COVID-19. Moved to February 10.
–	December 22	Colorado	–	Buffalo	Postponed due to COVID-19. Moved to February 19.
–	December 23	Buffalo	–	Columbus	Postponed due to COVID-19. Moved to February 20.
–	December 27	NY Islanders	–	Buffalo	Postponed due to COVID-19. Moved to February 15.
31	December 29	New Jersey	4–3	Buffalo		Luukkonen	11,511	10–16–5	25
32	December 30	Buffalo	1–4	NY Islanders		Subban	17,255	10–17–5	25

January: 4–6–2 (home: 1–3–1; road: 3–3–1)
#	Date	Visitor	Score	Home	OT	Decision	Attendance	Record	Pts	Recap
33	January 1	Buffalo	3–4	Boston	OT	Luukkonen	17,850	10–17–6	26
34	January 6	San Jose	3–2	Buffalo		Luukkonen	8,117	10–18–6	26
—	January 8	Buffalo	–	Montreal	Postponed due to attendance restrictions. Moved to February 13.
35	January 11	Tampa Bay	6–1	Buffalo		Luukkonen	8,368	10–19–6	26
36	January 13	Buffalo	4–1	Nashville		Dell	17,159	11–19–6	28
37	January 15	Buffalo	0–4	Detroit		Dell	19,515	11–20–6	28
38	January 17	Detroit	3–2	Buffalo	OT	Dell	8,839	11–20–7	29
39	January 18	Buffalo	3–1	Ottawa		Houser	0	12–20–7	31
40	January 20	Dallas	5–4	Buffalo		Dell	7,808	12–21–7	31
41	January 22	Philadelphia	3–6	Buffalo		Houser	9,264	13–21–7	33
42	January 25	Buffalo	0–5	Ottawa		Dell	0	13–22–7	33
43	January 29	Buffalo	3–1	Arizona		Anderson	12,853	14–22–7	35
44	January 30	Buffalo	1–4	Colorado		Tokarski	17,456	14–23–7	35

February: 2–7–1 (home: 1–2–1; road: 1–5–0)
#	Date	Visitor	Score	Home	OT	Decision	Attendance	Record	Pts	Recap
45	February 1	Buffalo	2–5	Vegas		Anderson	18,235	14–24–7	35
46	February 10	Columbus	4–3	Buffalo	OT	Tokarski	8,476	14–24–8	36
47	February 13	Buffalo	5–3	Montreal		Anderson	500	15–24–8	38
48	February 15	NY Islanders	3–6	Buffalo		Tokarski	9,296	16–24–8	40
49	February 17	Ottawa	3–1	Buffalo		Anderson	7,026	16–25–8	40
50	February 19	Colorado	5–3	Buffalo		Tokarski	10,526	16–26–8	40
51	February 20	Buffalo	3–7	Columbus		Anderson	18,608	16–27–8	40
52	February 23	Buffalo	0–4	Montreal		Anderson	10,552	16–28–8	40
53	February 25	Buffalo	3–5	St. Louis		Tokarski	18,096	16–29–8	40
54	February 27	Buffalo	2–4	Dallas		Anderson	18,532	16–30–8	40

March: 8–3–3 (home: 4–2–2; road: 4–1–1)
#	Date	Visitor	Score	Home	OT	Decision	Attendance	Record	Pts	Recap
55	March 2	Buffalo	5–1	Toronto		Anderson	17,122	17–30–8	42
56	March 4	Minnesota	4–5	Buffalo		Anderson	8,462	18–30–8	44
57	March 6	Los Angeles	3–0	Buffalo		Tokarski	10,775	18–31–8	44
58	March 7	Florida	6–1	Buffalo		Anderson	7,906	18–32–8	44
59	March 10	Vegas	1–3	Buffalo		Anderson	12,437	19–32–8	46
60	March 13	Toronto	2–5	Buffalo		Anderson	26,119 (outdoors)	20–32–8	48
61	March 17	Buffalo	1–6	Edmonton		Anderson	15,883	20–33–8	48
62	March 18	Buffalo	1–0	Calgary	OT	Tokarski	16,685	21–33–8	50
63	March 20	Buffalo	3–2	Vancouver	OT	Anderson	18,873	22–33–8	52
64	March 23	Pittsburgh	3–4	Buffalo	SO	Anderson	9,399	23–33–8	54
65	March 25	Washington	4–3	Buffalo	SO	Tokarski	9,740	23–33–9	55
66	March 27	Buffalo	4–5	NY Rangers	OT	Anderson	18,006	23–33–10	56
67	March 28	Buffalo	6–5	Chicago		Tokarski	18,648	24–33–10	58
68	March 30	Winnipeg	3–2	Buffalo	SO	Anderson	8,055	24–33–11	59

April: 8–6–0 (home: 5–2–0; road: 3–4–0)
#	Date	Visitor	Score	Home	OT	Decision	Attendance	Record	Pts	Recap
69	April 1	Nashville	3–4	Buffalo		Anderson	19,070	25–33–11	61
70	April 3	Florida	5–3	Buffalo		Tokarski	11,787	25–34–11	61
71	April 5	Carolina	2–4	Buffalo		Anderson	8,984	26–34–11	63
72	April 7	Buffalo	3–5	Carolina		Anderson	15,639	26–35–11	63
73	April 8	Buffalo	3–4	Florida		Tokarski	17,728	26–36–11	63
74	April 10	Buffalo	0–5	Tampa Bay		Anderson	19,092	26–37–11	63
75	April 12	Buffalo	5–2	Toronto		Anderson	18,393	27–37–11	65
76	April 14	St. Louis	6–2	Buffalo		Anderson	11,565	27–38–11	65
77	April 16	Philadelphia	3–4	Buffalo		Anderson	11,046	28–38–11	67
78	April 17	Buffalo	5–3	Philadelphia		Tokarski	14,377	29–38–11	69
79	April 21	Buffalo	5–2	New Jersey		Anderson	12,014	30–38–11	71
80	April 23	NY Islanders	3–5	Buffalo		Tokarski	12,955	31–38–11	73
81	April 28	Buffalo	0–5	Boston		Tokarski	17,850	31–39–11	73
82	April 29	Chicago	2–3	Buffalo	OT	Tokarski	16,505	32–39–11	75

Legend: Win (2 points) Loss (0 points) Overtime/shootout loss (1 point)

== Player statistics ==
=== Skaters ===
Regular season
Player	GP	G	A	Pts	+/−	PIM
Tage Thompson	78	38	30	68	−17	37
Jeff Skinner	80	33	30	63	−14	42
Rasmus Dahlin	80	13	40	53	−22	68
Victor Olofsson	72	20	29	49	−16	6
Kyle Okposo	74	21	24	45	−15	43
Dylan Cozens	79	13	25	38	−19	55
Alex Tuch^{†}	50	12	26	38	−3	14
Rasmus Asplund	80	8	19	27	−5	10
Vinnie Hinostroza	62	13	12	25	−11	24
Peyton Krebs^{†}	48	7	15	22	−20	20
Casey Mittelstadt	40	6	13	19	−14	4
Henri Jokiharju	60	3	16	19	−8	20
Zemgus Girgensons	56	10	8	18	−7	27
Colin Miller	38	2	12	14	−2	21
Cody Eakin	69	4	8	12	−15	22
Mark Pysyk	68	3	9	12	−4	16
Jacob Bryson	73	1	9	10	−9	12
Mattias Samuelsson	42	0	10	10	−10	16
Anders Bjork	58	5	3	8	−14	10
Will Butcher	37	2	6	8	−10	0
Robert Hagg^{‡}	48	1	7	8	−9	25
Brett Murray	19	2	4	6	−3	23
Casey Fitzgerald	36	0	6	6	−19	36
Mark Jankowski	19	2	3	5	+2	4
Drake Caggiula	18	2	3	5	−4	4
John Hayden	55	2	2	4	−12	84
Arttu Ruotsalainen	18	2	2	4	−1	6
Owen Power	8	2	1	3	+3	2
Jack Quinn	2	1	1	2	0	0
Ethan Prow	4	1	0	1	−1	0
Ryan MacInnis	1	0	0	0	0	0
Christian Wolanin^{‡}	1	0	0	0	−2	0
Brandon Biro	1	0	0	0	0	0
JJ Peterka	2	0	0	0	0	0

=== Goaltenders ===
Regular season
Player	GP	GS	TOI	W	L	OT	GA	GAA	SA	SV%	SO	G	A	PIM
Craig Anderson	31	31	1,867:15	17	12	2	97	3.12	945	.897	0	0	1	0
Dustin Tokarski	29	28	1,671:26	10	12	5	91	3.27	900	.899	1	0	0	0
Michael Houser	2	2	120:00	2	0	0	4	2.00	77	.948	0	0	0	0
Ukko-Pekka Luukkonen	9	9	503:04	2	5	2	23	2.74	277	.917	0	0	0	0
Aaron Dell	12	9	565:23	1	8	1	38	4.03	354	.893	0	0	0	2
Malcolm Subban^{†}	4	3	210:28	0	2	1	17	4.85	132	.871	0	0	0	0

^{†}Denotes player spent time with another team before joining the Sabres. Stats reflect time with the Sabres only.
^{‡}Denotes player was traded mid-season. Stats reflect time with the Sabres only.
Bold/italics denotes franchise record.

== Awards and honours ==
=== Awards ===
Regular season
Player	Award	Awarded

== Transactions ==
The Sabres have been involved in the following transactions during the 2021–22 season.

=== Trades ===
Date	Details		Ref
July 23, 2021	To Philadelphia Flyers Rasmus Ristolainen	To Buffalo Sabres Robert Hagg; 1st-round pick in 2021; 2nd-round pick in 2023	
July 24, 2021	To Florida Panthers Sam Reinhart	To Buffalo Sabres Devon Levi; 1st-round pick in 2022	
July 28, 2021	To New Jersey Devils 5th-round pick in 2022	To Buffalo Sabres Will Butcher	
November 4, 2021	To Vegas Golden Knights Jack Eichel; Conditional 3rd-round pick in 2023 or 2024	To Buffalo Sabres Peyton Krebs; Alex Tuch; Conditional 1st-round pick in 2022 or 2023; Conditional 2nd-round pick in 2023 or 2024	
November 4, 2021	To New York Islanders Future considerations	To Buffalo Sabres Johnny Boychuk	
December 2, 2021	To Chicago Blackhawks Future considerations	To Buffalo Sabres Malcolm Subban	
March 20, 2022	To Florida Panthers Robert Hagg	To Buffalo Sabres CGY 6th-round pick in 2022	
June 10, 2022	To Dallas Stars Future considerations	To Buffalo Sabres Ben Bishop; 7th-round pick in 2022	

=== Players acquired ===
Date	Player	Former team	Term	Via	Ref
July 28, 2021	Craig Anderson	Washington Capitals	1-year	Free agency	
July 28, 2021	Aaron Dell	New Jersey Devils	1-year	Free agency	
July 28, 2021	John Hayden	Arizona Coyotes	1-year	Free agency	
July 28, 2021	Vinnie Hinostroza	Chicago Blackhawks	1-year	Free agency	
July 28, 2021	Sean Malone	Nashville Predators	1-year	Free agency	
July 28, 2021	Ethan Prow	Florida Panthers	1-year	Free agency	
July 28, 2021	Mark Pysyk	Dallas Stars	1-year	Free agency	
July 28, 2021	Jimmy Schuldt	Vegas Golden Knights	1-year	Free agency	
July 30, 2021	Ryan MacInnis	Columbus Blue Jackets	1-year	Free agency	
October 4, 2021	Axel Jonsson-Fjallby	Washington Capitals		Waivers	
October 16, 2021	Christian Wolanin	Los Angeles Kings		Waivers	
January 12, 2022	Michael Houser	Rochester Americans (AHL)	1-year	Free agency	

=== Players lost ===
Date	Player	New team	Term	Via	Ref
July 21, 2021	William Borgen	Seattle Kraken		Expansion draft	
July 28, 2021	Jean-Sebastien Dea	Montreal Canadiens	1-year	Free agency	
July 28, 2021	Matt Irwin	Washington Capitals	1-year	Free agency	
July 28, 2021	Steven Fogarty	Boston Bruins	1-year	Free agency	
July 28, 2021	Carter Hutton	Arizona Coyotes	1-year	Free agency	
July 28, 2021	Jake McCabe	Chicago Blackhawks	4-year	Free agency	
July 28, 2021	C. J. Smith	Carolina Hurricanes	1-year	Free agency	
July 28, 2021	Linus Ullmark	Boston Bruins	4-year	Free agency	
July 29, 2021	Stefanos Lekkas	Fort Wayne Komets (ECHL)	Unknown	Free agency	
August 5, 2021	Michael Houser	Rochester Americans (AHL)	1-year	Free agency	
September 1, 2021	Riley Sheahan	Seattle Kraken	1-year	Free agency	
October 11, 2021	Axel Jonsson-Fjallby	Washington Capitals		Waivers	
October 15, 2021	Tobias Rieder	Växjö Lakers (SHL)	1-year	Free agency	

=== Signings ===
Date	Player	Term	Contract type	Ref
July 27, 2021	Drake Caggiula	1-year	Re-signing	
July 28, 2021	Brandon Davidson	1-year	Re-signing	
July 30, 2021	Rasmus Asplund	2-year	Re-signing	
August 13, 2021	Casey Fitzgerald	2-year	Re-signing	
September 2, 2021	Henri Jokiharju	3-year	Re-signing	
September 2, 2021	Casey Mittelstadt	3-year	Re-signing	
September 22, 2021	Rasmus Dahlin	3-year	Re-signing	
April 8, 2022	Owen Power	3-year	Entry-level	
April 18, 2022	Josh Bloom	3-year	Entry-level	
May 11, 2022	Aleksandr Kisakov	3-year	Entry-level	
May 22, 2022	Olivier Nadeau	3-year	Entry-level	
May 31, 2022	Isak Rosen	3-year	Entry-level	
June 13, 2022	Filip Cederqvist	2-year	Entry-level	
June 29, 2022	Sean Malone	1-year	Extension	
June 30, 2022	Craig Anderson	1-year	Extension	

== Draft picks ==
Below are the Buffalo Sabres selections at the 2021 NHL entry draft, which was held on July 23 and 24, 2021, virtually via video conference call from the NHL Network studios in Secaucus, New Jersey, due to the COVID-19 pandemic.

Round	#	Player	Pos	Nationality	College/Junior/Club team (League)
1	1	Owen Power	D	Canada	University of Michigan (Big Ten)
1	14^{1}	Isak Rosen	RW	Sweden	Leksands IF (SHL)
2	33	Prokhor Poltapov	RW	Russia	HC CSKA Moscow (KHL)
2	53^{2}	Aleksandr Kisakov	LW	Russia	MHC Dynamo Moscow (MHL)
3	88^{3}	Stiven Sardarian	RW	Russia	Krasnaya Armiya (MHL)
3	95^{4}	Joshua Bloom	LW	Canada	Saginaw Spirit (OHL)
4	97	Olivier Nadeau	RW	Canada	Shawinigan Cataractes (QMJHL)
5	159^{4}	Viljami Marjala	LW	Finland	Quebec Remparts (QMJHL)
6	161	William von Barnekow-Lofberg	C	Sweden	Malmo Redhwaks U20 (J20 SuperElit)
6	188^{5}	Nikita Novikov	D	Russia	Dynamo Moscow (MHL)
7	193	Tyson Kozak	C	Canada	Portland Winterhawks (WHL)

Notes:

1. The Philadelphia Flyers' first-round pick went to the Buffalo Sabres as the result of a trade on July 23, 2021, that sent Rasmus Ristolainen to Philadelphia in exchange for Robert Hagg, a second-round pick in 2023 and this pick.
2. The Boston Bruins' second-round pick went to the Buffalo Sabres as the result of a trade on April 11, 2021, that sent Taylor Hall and Curtis Lazar to Boston in exchange for Anders Bjork and this pick.
3. The Florida Panthers' third-round pick went to the Buffalo Sabres as the result of a trade on April 10, 2021, that sent Brandon Montour to Florida in exchange for this pick.
4. The Montreal Canadiens' third- and fifth-round picks went to the Buffalo Sabres as the result of a trade on March 26, 2021, that sent Eric Staal to Montreal in exchange for these picks.
5. The Colorado Avalanche's sixth-round pick went to the Buffalo Sabres as the result of a trade on March 20, 2021, that sent Jonas Johansson to Colorado in exchange for this pick.
