= 2021–22 Carolina Hurricanes season =

Season of play of professional ice hockey team

2021–22 Carolina Hurricanes
- Metropolitan Division champions
- Division: 1st Metropolitan
- Conference: 2nd Eastern
- 2021–22 record: 54–20–8
- Home record: 29–8–4
- Road record: 25–12–4
- Goals for: 278
- Goals against: 202

Team information
- General manager: Don Waddell
- Coach: Rod Brind'Amour
- Captain: Jordan Staal
- Alternate captains: Sebastian Aho; Jordan Martinook; Jaccob Slavin
- Arena: PNC Arena
- Average attendance: 17,210
- Minor league affiliates: Chicago Wolves (AHL); Norfolk Admirals (ECHL)

Team leaders
- Goals: Sebastian Aho (37)
- Assists: Sebastian Aho (44)
- Points: Sebastian Aho (81)
- Penalty minutes: Ian Cole (83)
- Plus/minus: Jaccob Slavin (+35)
- Wins: Frederik Andersen (35)
- Goals against average: Frederik Andersen (2.17)

The 2021–22 Carolina Hurricanes season was the 43rd season for the National Hockey League (NHL) franchise, established in June 1979, and the 24th season since the franchise relocated from the Hartford Whalers to start the 1997–98 NHL season. On April 9, 2022, the Hurricanes clinched a playoff berth after a 5–3 win against the Buffalo Sabres.

In the playoffs, the Hurricanes defeated the Boston Bruins in the first round in seven games, but they were upset in the Second Round by the New York Rangers, losing in seven games.

== Standings ==
=== Divisional standings ===
Metropolitan Division
Pos	Team	GP	W	L	OTL	RW	GF	GA	GD	Pts
1	y – Carolina Hurricanes	82	54	20	8	47	278	202	+76	116
2	x – New York Rangers	82	52	24	6	44	254	207	+47	110
3	x – Pittsburgh Penguins	82	46	25	11	37	272	229	+43	103
4	x – Washington Capitals	82	44	26	12	35	275	245	+30	100
5	New York Islanders	82	37	35	10	34	231	237	−6	84
6	Columbus Blue Jackets	82	37	38	7	26	262	300	−38	81
7	New Jersey Devils	82	27	46	9	19	248	307	−59	63
8	Philadelphia Flyers	82	25	46	11	20	211	298	−87	61

Source: National Hockey League
Rules for classification: 1) Fewer number of games played (GP, only during regular season); 2) Greater number of regulation wins (RW); 3) Greater number of wins in regulation and overtime, excluding shootout wins (ROW); 4) Greater number of total wins, including shootouts (W); 5) Greater number of points earned in head-to-head play; if teams played an uneven number of head-to-head games, the result of the first game on the home ice of the team with the extra home game is discarded; 6) Greater goal differential (GD); 7) Greater number of goals scored (GF)
x – Clinched playoff spot; y – Clinched division

=== Conference standings ===
Eastern Conference Wild Card
Pos	Div	Team	GP	W	L	OTL	RW	GF	GA	GD	Pts
1	AT	x – Boston Bruins	82	51	26	5	40	255	220	+35	107
2	ME	x – Washington Capitals	82	44	26	12	35	275	245	+30	100
3	ME	New York Islanders	82	37	35	10	34	231	237	−6	84
4	ME	Columbus Blue Jackets	82	37	38	7	26	262	300	−38	81
5	AT	Buffalo Sabres	82	32	39	11	25	232	290	−58	75
6	AT	Detroit Red Wings	82	32	40	10	21	230	312	−82	74
7	AT	Ottawa Senators	82	33	42	7	26	227	266	−39	73
8	ME	New Jersey Devils	82	27	46	9	19	248	307	−59	63
9	ME	Philadelphia Flyers	82	25	46	11	20	211	298	−87	61
10	AT	Montreal Canadiens	82	22	49	11	16	221	319	−98	55

Source: National Hockey League
Rules for classification: 1) Fewer number of games played (GP, only during regular season); 2) Greater number of regulation wins (RW); 3) Greater number of wins in regulation and overtime, excluding shootout wins (ROW); 4) Greater number of total wins, including shootouts (W); 5) Greater number of points earned in head-to-head play; if teams played an uneven number of head-to-head games, the result of the first game on the home ice of the team with the extra home game is discarded; 6) Greater goal differential (GD); 7) Greater number of goals scored (GF)
x – Clinched playoff spot

== Schedule and results ==
=== Preseason ===
2021 preseason: 1–2–1 (home: 1–0–1; road: 0–2–0)

Game	Date	Opponent	Score	OT	Decision	Location	Attendance	Record	Recap
1	September 28	Tampa Bay Lightning	3–1		Andersen	PNC Arena	8,136	1–0–0	
2	October 1	@ Tampa Bay Lightning	5–8		Raanta	Amalie Arena	12,509	1–1–0	
3	October 5	Nashville Predators	2–3	OT	Raanta	PNC Arena	7,011	1–1–1	
4	October 9	@ Nashville Predators	3–4		Andersen	Bridgestone Arena	15,095	1–2–1	

=== Regular season ===
2021–22 game log
October: 8–0–0 (home: 5–0–0; road: 3–0–0)

Game	Date	Opponent	Score	OT	Decision	Location	Attendance	Record	Points	Recap
1	October 14	New York Islanders	6–3		Andersen	PNC Arena	18,680	1–0–0	2	
2	October 16	@ Nashville Predators	3–2		Andersen	Bridgestone Arena	17,162	2–0–0	4	
3	October 21	@ Montreal Canadiens	4–1		Andersen	Bell Centre	19,174	3–0–0	6	
4	October 23	@ Columbus Blue Jackets	5–1		Andersen	Nationwide Arena	14,386	4–0–0	8	
5	October 25	Toronto Maple Leafs	4–1		Andersen	PNC Arena	14,011	5–0–0	10	
6	October 28	Boston Bruins	3–0		Andersen	PNC Arena	16,093	6–0–0	12	
7	October 29	Chicago Blackhawks	6–3		Raanta	PNC Arena	16,434	7–0–0	14	
8	October 31	Arizona Coyotes	2–1		Andersen	PNC Arena	14,343	8–0–0	16	

November: 7–5–1 (home: 1–2–0; road: 6–3–1)

Game	Date	Opponent	Score	OT	Decision	Location	Attendance	Record	Points	Recap
9	November 3	@ Chicago Blackhawks	4–3		Andersen	United Center	16,449	9–0–0	18	
10	November 6	@ Florida Panthers	2–5		Andersen	FLA Live Arena	13,835	9–1–0	18	
11	November 9	@ Tampa Bay Lightning	2–1	OT	Andersen	Amalie Arena	19,092	10–1–0	20	
12	November 12	Philadelphia Flyers	1–2		Andersen	PNC Arena	18,680	10–2–0	20	
13	November 13	St. Louis Blues	3–2		Lyon	PNC Arena	18,680	11–2–0	22	
14	November 16	@ Vegas Golden Knights	4–2		Raanta	T-Mobile Arena	17,737	12–2–0	24	
15	November 18	@ Anaheim Ducks	2–1		Andersen	Honda Center	12,379	13–2–0	26	
16	November 20	@ Los Angeles Kings	5–4		Andersen	Staples Center	15,744	14–2–0	28	
17	November 22	@ San Jose Sharks	1–2	OT	Raanta	SAP Center	10,970	14–2–1	29	
18	November 24	@ Seattle Kraken	1–2		Andersen	Climate Pledge Arena	17,151	14–3–1	29	
19	November 26	@ Philadelphia Flyers	6–3		Raanta	Wells Fargo Center	18,959	15–3–1	31	
20	November 28	Washington Capitals	2–4		Andersen	PNC Arena	18,815	15–4–1	31	
21	November 30	@ Dallas Stars	1–4		Andersen	American Airlines Center	17,345	15–5–1	31	

December: 7–2–0 (home: 4–1–0; road: 3–1–0)

Game	Date	Opponent	Score	OT	Decision	Location	Attendance	Record	Points	Recap
22	December 2	Ottawa Senators	2–3		Raanta	PNC Arena	14,915	15–6–1	31	
23	December 4	Buffalo Sabres	6–2		Raanta	PNC Arena	18,680	16–6–1	33	
24	December 7	@ Winnipeg Jets	4–2		Andersen	Canada Life Centre	13,761	17–6–1	35	
25	December 9	@ Calgary Flames	2–1	OT	Andersen	Scotiabank Saddledome	15,620	18–6–1	37	
26	December 11	@ Edmonton Oilers	3–1		Andersen	Rogers Place	18,025	19–6–1	39	
27	December 12	@ Vancouver Canucks	1–2		Raanta	Rogers Arena	18,714	19–7–1	39	
—	December 14	@ Minnesota Wild	Postponed due to COVID-19. Moved to February 12.							
28	December 16	Detroit Red Wings	5–3		Andersen	PNC Arena	16,017	20–7–1	41	
29	December 18	Los Angeles Kings	5–1		Andersen	PNC Arena	16,238	21–7–1	43	
—	December 19	Nashville Predators	Postponed due to COVID-19. Moved to February 18.							
—	December 21	@ Boston Bruins	Postponed due to COVID-19. Moved to February 10.							
—	December 23	@ Ottawa Senators	Postponed due to COVID-19. Moved to February 8.							
—	December 27	Florida Panthers	Postponed due to COVID-19. Moved to February 16.							
30	December 30	Montreal Canadiens	4–0		Raanta	PNC Arena	17,722	22–7–1	45	

January: 9–2–1 (home: 6–1–1; road: 3–1–0)

Game	Date	Opponent	Score	OT	Decision	Location	Attendance	Record	Points	Recap
31	January 1	@ Columbus Blue Jackets	7–4		Andersen	Nationwide Arena	15,736	23–7–1	47	
—	January 3	@ Toronto Maple Leafs	Postponed due to attendance restrictions. Moved to February 7.							
32	January 7	Calgary Flames	6–3		Andersen	PNC Arena	16,281	24–7–1	49	
33	January 8	Florida Panthers	3–4	OT	Lyon	PNC Arena	18,680	24–7–2	50	
—	January 11	@ Philadelphia Flyers	Postponed due to COVID-19. Moved to February 21.							
34	January 13	Columbus Blue Jackets	0–6		Andersen	PNC Arena	15,979	24–8–2	50	
35	January 15	Vancouver Canucks	4–1		Andersen	PNC Arena	17,435	25–8–2	52	
36	January 18	@ Boston Bruins	7–1		Andersen	TD Garden	17,850	26–8–2	54	
37	January 21	New York Rangers	6–3		Andersen	PNC Arena	16,118	27–8–2	56	
38	January 22	@ New Jersey Devils	4–7		LaFontaine	Prudential Center	13,657	27–9–2	56	
39	January 25	Vegas Golden Knights	4–3	OT	Andersen	PNC Arena	15,228	28–9–2	58	
40	January 27	@ Ottawa Senators	3–2	SO	Andersen	Canadian Tire Centre	0	29–9–2	60	
41	January 29	New Jersey Devils	2–1		Raanta	PNC Arena	18,956	30–9–2	62	
42	January 30	San Jose Sharks	2–1		Andersen	PNC Arena	15,975	31–9–2	64	

February: 6–2–2 (home: 3–0–1; road: 3–2–1)

Game	Date	Opponent	Score	OT	Decision	Location	Attendance	Record	Points	Recap
43	February 7	@ Toronto Maple Leafs	3–4	OT	Andersen	Scotiabank Arena	500	31–9–3	65	
44	February 8	@ Ottawa Senators	3–4		Raanta	Canadian Tire Centre	500	31–10–3	65	
45	February 10	@ Boston Bruins	6–0		Andersen	TD Garden	17,850	32–10–3	67	
46	February 12	@ Minnesota Wild	2–3		Andersen	Xcel Energy Center	18,802	32–11–3	67	
47	February 16	Florida Panthers	2–3	OT	Andersen	PNC Arena	16,986	32–11–4	68	
48	February 18	Nashville Predators	5–3		Andersen	PNC Arena	18,911	33–11–4	70	
49	February 20	@ Pittsburgh Penguins	4–3		Raanta	PPG Paints Arena	18,429	34–11–4	72	
50	February 21	@ Philadelphia Flyers	4–3	OT	Andersen	Wells Fargo Center	14,591	35–11–4	74	
51	February 25	Columbus Blue Jackets	4–0		Andersen	PNC Arena	17,112	36–11–4	76	
52	February 27	Edmonton Oilers	2–1		Andersen	PNC Arena	18,801	37–11–4	78	

March: 8–4–4 (home: 6–1–2; road: 2–3–2)

Game	Date	Opponent	Score	OT	Decision	Location	Attendance	Record	Points	Recap
53	March 1	@ Detroit Red Wings	3–4	OT	Raanta	Little Caesars Arena	14,874	37–11–5	79	
54	March 3	@ Washington Capitals	0–4		Andersen	Capital One Arena	18,573	37–12–5	79	
55	March 4	Pittsburgh Penguins	3–2	OT	Raanta	PNC Arena	19,023	38–12–5	81	
56	March 6	Seattle Kraken	3–2		Raanta	PNC Arena	18,156	39–12–5	83	
57	March 10	Colorado Avalanche	2–0		Raanta	PNC Arena	18,056	40–12–5	85	
58	March 12	Philadelphia Flyers	3–1		Andersen	PNC Arena	18,680	41–12–5	87	
59	March 13	@ Pittsburgh Penguins	2–4		Raanta	PPG Paints Arena	17,866	41–13–5	87	
60	March 17	@ Toronto Maple Leafs	2–3		Andersen	Scotiabank Arena	18,134	41–14–5	87	
61	March 18	Washington Capitals	3–4	SO	Raanta	PNC Arena	18,680	41–14–6	88	
62	March 20	New York Rangers	0–2		Andersen	PNC Arena	18,680	41–15–6	88	
63	March 22	Tampa Bay Lightning	3–2		Andersen	PNC Arena	16,783	42–15–6	90	
64	March 24	Dallas Stars	3–4	SO	Andersen	PNC Arena	16,421	42–15–7	91	
65	March 26	@ St. Louis Blues	7–2		Raanta	Enterprise Center	18,096	43–15–7	93	
66	March 28	@ Washington Capitals	6–1		Andersen	Capital One Arena	18,573	44–15–7	95	
67	March 29	@ Tampa Bay Lightning	3–4	OT	Raanta	Amalie Arena	19,092	44–15–8	96	
68	March 31	Montreal Canadiens	4–0		Andersen	PNC Arena	15,289	45–15–8	98	

April: 9–5–0 (home: 4–3–0; road: 5–2–0)

Game	Date	Opponent	Score	OT	Decision	Location	Attendance	Record	Points	Recap
69	April 2	Minnesota Wild	1–3		Andersen	PNC Arena	16,375	45–16–8	98	
70	April 5	@ Buffalo Sabres	2–4		Andersen	KeyBank Center	8,984	45–17–8	98	
71	April 7	Buffalo Sabres	5–3		Andersen	PNC Arena	15,639	46–17–8	100	
72	April 8	New York Islanders	1–2		Andersen	PNC Arena	17,279	46–18–8	100	
73	April 10	Anaheim Ducks	5–2		Andersen	PNC Arena	17,342	47–18–8	102	
74	April 12	@ New York Rangers	4–2		Andersen	Madison Square Garden	18,006	48–18–8	104	
75	April 14	Detroit Red Wings	0–3		Raanta	PNC Arena	17,811	48–19–8	104	
76	April 16	@ Colorado Avalanche	4–7		Andersen	Ball Arena	18,091	48–20–8	104	
77	April 18	@ Arizona Coyotes	5–3		Raanta	Gila River Arena	8,496	49–20–8	106	
78	April 21	Winnipeg Jets	4–2		Raanta	PNC Arena	17,587	50–20–8	108	
79	April 23	@ New Jersey Devils	3–2	OT	Kochetkov	Prudential Center	10,376	51–20–8	110	
80	April 24	@ New York Islanders	5–2		Kochetkov	UBS Arena	15,945	52–20–8	112	
81	April 26	@ New York Rangers	4–3		Kochetkov	Madison Square Garden	17,358	53–20–8	114	
82	April 28	New Jersey Devils	6–3		Raanta	PNC Arena	18,040	54–20–8	116	

2021–22 schedule

Win (2 Points) Loss (0 points) Overtime/shootout loss (1 point)

=== Playoffs ===
2022 Stanley Cup playoffs

Eastern Conference First Round vs. (WC1) Boston Bruins: Carolina won 4–3
#	Date	Visitor	Score	Home	OT	Decision	Attendance	Series	Recap
1	May 2	Boston	1–5	Carolina		Raanta	18,680	1–0
2	May 4	Boston	2–5	Carolina		Kochetkov	18,880	2–0
3	May 6	Carolina	2–4	Boston		Kochetkov	17,850	2–1
4	May 8	Carolina	2–5	Boston		Raanta	17,850	2–2
5	May 10	Boston	1–5	Carolina		Raanta	19,163	3–2
6	May 12	Carolina	2–5	Boston		Raanta	17,850	3–3
7	May 14	Boston	2–3	Carolina		Raanta	19,513	4–3

Eastern Conference Second Round vs. (M2) New York Rangers: New York won 4–3
#	Date	Visitor	Score	Home	OT	Decision	Attendance	Series	Recap
1	May 18	NY Rangers	1–2	Carolina	OT	Raanta	18,705	1–0
2	May 20	NY Rangers	0–2	Carolina		Raanta	19,332	2–0
3	May 22	Carolina	1–3	NY Rangers		Raanta	18,006	2–1
4	May 24	Carolina	1–4	NY Rangers		Raanta	18,006	2–2
5	May 26	NY Rangers	1–3	Carolina		Raanta	18,786	3–2
6	May 28	Carolina	2–5	NY Rangers		Raanta	18,006	3–3
7	May 30	NY Rangers	6–2	Carolina		Kochetkov	18,922	3–4

Legend: Win Loss

== Player statistics ==
=== Skaters ===
Regular season
Player	GP	G	A	Pts	+/−	PIM
Sebastian Aho	79	37	44	81	+18	38
Andrei Svechnikov	78	30	39	69	+19	79
Teuvo Teravainen	77	22	43	65	+22	24
Vincent Trocheck	81	21	30	51	+21	78
Tony DeAngelo	64	10	41	51	+30	56
Nino Niederreiter	75	24	20	44	+29	34
Jaccob Slavin	79	4	38	42	+35	10
Seth Jarvis	68	17	23	40	+11	18
Martin Necas	78	14	26	40	+5	32
Brady Skjei	82	9	30	39	+22	48
Jordan Staal	78	17	19	36	+11	18
Jesper Fast	82	14	20	34	+24	4
Jesperi Kotkaniemi	66	12	17	29	+3	37
Brett Pesce	70	7	21	28	+5	39
Derek Stepan	58	9	10	19	0	14
Ian Cole	75	2	17	19	+15	83
Jordan Martinook	59	6	9	15	+1	22
Ethan Bear	58	5	9	14	+1	20
Steven Lorentz	67	8	5	13	0	8
Brendan Smith	45	4	4	8	+6	36
Max Domi^{†}	19	2	5	7	+8	18
Josh Leivo	7	1	2	3	+1	2
Jalen Chatfield	16	0	3	3	+1	8
Jack Drury	2	2	0	2	+3	2
Andrew Poturalski	2	0	2	2	−1	0
Stefan Noesen	2	0	0	0	+1	0
Maxime Lajoie	5	0	0	0	+2	0
C.J. Smith	1	0	0	0	−1	0
Joey Keane	1	0	0	0	0	2

Playoffs
Player	GP	G	A	Pts	+/−	PIM
Sebastian Aho	14	4	7	11	0	12
Teuvo Teravainen	14	4	7	11	+4	2
Vincent Trocheck	14	6	4	10	+7	10
Tony DeAngelo	14	1	9	10	0	12
Seth Jarvis	14	3	5	8	−1	4
Jaccob Slavin	14	2	6	8	+6	6
Max Domi	14	3	3	6	+6	4
Jordan Staal	14	1	5	6	0	2
Andrei Svechnikov	14	4	1	5	−1	14
Nino Niederreiter	14	4	1	5	−5	10
Martin Necas	14	0	5	5	0	0
Brendan Smith	14	1	3	4	0	12
Brett Pesce	14	1	2	3	0	6
Brady Skjei	14	1	2	3	−1	8
Ian Cole	14	1	1	2	+2	10
Jesperi Kotkaniemi	14	0	2	2	−4	2
Jesper Fast	14	1	0	1	−2	0
Jordan Martinook	6	0	1	1	0	4
Steven Lorentz	5	0	0	0	0	17
Derek Stepan	3	0	0	0	−2	0

=== Goaltenders ===
Regular season
Player	GP	GS	TOI	W	L	OT	GA	GAA	SA	SV%	SO	G	A	PIM
Frederik Andersen	52	51	3,070:53	35	14	3	111	2.17	1,431	.922	4	0	4	0
Antti Raanta	28	26	1,516:38	15	5	4	62	2.45	706	.912	2	0	0	0
Pyotr Kochetkov	3	2	148:36	3	0	0	6	2.42	61	.902	0	0	0	0
Alex Lyon	2	2	122:49	1	0	1	6	2.93	65	.908	0	0	0	0
Jack LaFontaine	2	1	74:57	0	1	0	9	7.20	41	.780	0	0	0	0

Playoffs
Player	GP	GS	TOI	W	L	GA	GAA	SA	SV%	SO	G	A	PIM
Antti Raanta	13	13	663:25	6	5	25	2.26	322	.922	1	0	0	0
Pyotr Kochetkov	4	1	169:34	1	2	11	3.89	84	.869	0	0	0	2

^{†}Denotes player spent time with another team before joining the Hurricanes. Stats reflect time with the Hurricanes only.
^{‡}Denotes player was traded mid-season. Stats reflect time with the Hurricanes only.
Bold/italics denotes franchise record.

== Transactions ==
The Hurricanes have been involved in the following transactions during the 2021–22 season.

=== Trades ===
Date	Details		Ref
July 14, 2021	To Edmonton Oilers Future considerations	To Carolina Hurricanes Dylan Wells	
July 22, 2021	To Detroit Red Wings Alex Nedeljkovic	To Carolina Hurricanes Jonathan Bernier; VGK 3rd-round pick in 2021	
July 23, 2021	To Columbus Blue Jackets Jake Bean	To Carolina Hurricanes CHI 2nd-round pick in 2021	
July 23, 2021	To Nashville Predators 1st-round pick in 2021	To Carolina Hurricanes LAK 2nd-round pick in 2021; 2nd-round pick in 2021	
July 24, 2021	To Los Angeles Kings 2nd-round pick in 2021	To Carolina Hurricanes 3rd-round pick in 2021; CGY 4th-round pick in 2021	
July 24, 2021	To Nashville Predators LAK 3rd-round pick in 2021	To Carolina Hurricanes 3rd-round pick in 2021; 5th-round pick in 2021	
July 24, 2021	To Chicago Blackhawks 3rd-round pick in 2021	To Carolina Hurricanes 3rd-round pick in 2022	
July 24, 2021	To Ottawa Senators 4th-round pick in 2021	To Carolina Hurricanes LAK 5th-round pick in 2021; 6th-round pick in 2021	
July 28, 2021	To Edmonton Oilers Warren Foegele	To Carolina Hurricanes Ethan Bear	
March 21, 2022	To Columbus Blue Jackets Aidan Hreschuk	To Carolina Hurricanes Max Domi; Tyler Inamoto	
March 21, 2022	To Florida Panthers Yegor Korshkov; CBJ 6th-round pick in 2022	To Carolina Hurricanes Max Domi; Tyler Inamoto	
March 28, 2022	To New York Rangers Maxim Letunov	To Carolina Hurricanes Tarmo Reunanen	

=== Players acquired ===
Date	Player	Former team	Term	Via	Ref
July 28, 2021	Frederik Andersen	Toronto Maple Leafs	2-year	Free agency	
July 28, 2021	Ian Cole	Minnesota Wild	1-year	Free agency	
July 28, 2021	Tony DeAngelo	New York Rangers	1-year	Free agency	
July 28, 2021	Josh Leivo	Calgary Flames	1-year	Free agency	
July 28, 2021	Antti Raanta	Arizona Coyotes	2-year	Free agency	
July 28, 2021	C. J. Smith	Buffalo Sabres	1-year	Free agency	
July 29, 2021	Brendan Smith	New York Rangers	1-year	Free agency	
July 30, 2021	Jalen Chatfield	Vancouver Canucks	1-year	Free agency	
July 30, 2021	Sam Miletic	Pittsburgh Penguins	1-year	Free agency	
July 31, 2021	Stefan Noesen	Toronto Maple Leafs	1-year	Free agency	
July 31, 2021	Alex Lyon	Philadelphia Flyers	1-year	Free agency	
July 31, 2021	Maxim Letunov	San Jose Sharks	1-year	Free agency	
July 31, 2021	Derek Stepan	Ottawa Senators	1-year	Free agency	
August 4, 2021	Josh Jacobs	New Jersey Devils	1-year	Free agency	
August 11, 2021	Andrew Poturalski	Anaheim Ducks	1-year	Free agency	
September 4, 2021	Jesperi Kotkaniemi	Montreal Canadiens	1-year	Free agency	

=== Players lost ===
Date	Player	New team	Term	Via	Ref
July 21, 2021	Morgan Geekie	Seattle Kraken		Expansion draft	
July 28, 2021	Dougie Hamilton	New Jersey Devils	7-year	Free agency	
July 28, 2021	Brock McGinn	Pittsburgh Penguins	4-year	Free agency	
July 28, 2021	Roland McKeown	Colorado Avalanche	2-year	Free agency	
July 28, 2021	Petr Mrazek	Toronto Maple Leafs	3-year	Free agency	
July 28, 2021	Cedric Paquette	Montreal Canadiens	1-year	Free agency	
July 28, 2021	James Reimer	San Jose Sharks	2-year	Free agency	
July 28, 2021	Sheldon Rempal	Vancouver Canucks	1-year	Free agency	
July 29, 2021	Jani Hakanpaa	Dallas Stars	3-year	Free agency	
August 11, 2021	Dylan Wells	Chicago Wolves (AHL)	1-year	Free agency	
August 20, 2021	Antoine Bibeau	Seattle Kraken	1-year	Free agency	
August 20, 2021	David Gust	Chicago Wolves (AHL)	1-year	Free agency	
September 29, 2021	Max McCormick	Seattle Kraken	1-year	Free agency	
November 23, 2021	Eric Gelinas			Contract termination	
June 29, 2022	Tarmo Reunanen	Lukko (Liiga)	2-year	Free agency	
July 1, 2022	Jesper Sellgren	Luleå HF (SHL)	3-year	Free agency	

=== Signings ===
Date	Player	Term	Contract type	Ref
July 7, 2021	Jack Drury	3-year	Entry-level	
July 16, 2021	Morgan Geekie	1-year	Re-signing	
July 25, 2021	Spencer Smallman	1-year	Re-signing	
July 28, 2021	Jordan Martinook	3-year	Re-signing	
August 12, 2021	Maxime Lajoie	1-year	Re-signing	
August 15, 2021	Aleksi Heimosalmi	3-year	Entry-level	
August 15, 2021	Ville Koivunen	3-year	Entry-level	
August 26, 2021	Andrei Svechnikov	8-year	Re-signing	
September 24, 2021	Ronan Seeley	3-year	Entry-level	
January 9, 2022	Jack LaFontaine	3-year	Entry-level	
March 21, 2022	Jesperi Kotkaniemi	8-year	Extension	
March 30, 2022	Noel Gunler	3-year	Entry-level	
May 4, 2022	Alexander Pashin	3-year	Entry-level	

== Draft picks ==
Below are the Carolina Hurricanes' selections at the 2021 NHL entry draft, which were held on July 23 to 24, 2021. It was held virtually via Video conference call from the NHL Network studio in Secaucus, New Jersey.

Round	#	Player	Pos.	Nationality	Team (League)
2	40	Scott Morrow	D	USA	Shattuck-Saint Mary's Sabres (USHS-MN)
2	44	Aleksi Heimosalmi	D	Finland	Assat (Liiga)
2	51	Ville Koivunen	RW	Finland	Karpat (U20 SM-sarja)
3	83	Patrik Hamrla	G	Czech Republic	HC Energie Karlovy Vary (ELH)
3	94	Aidan Hreschuk	D	USA	U.S. NTDP (USHL)
4	109	Jackson Blake	RW	USA	Chicago Steel (USHL)
5	136	Robert Orr	C	Canada	Halifax Mooseheads (QMJHL)
5	147	Justin Robidas	C	Canada	Val-d'Or Foreurs (QMJHL)
6	169	Bryce Montgomery	D	USA	London Knights (OHL)
6	187	Nikita Quapp	G	Germany	Krefeld Pinguine (DEL)
7	200	Yegor Naumov	G	Russia	Krylya Sovetov Moscow (MHL)
7	209	Nikita Guslistov	C	Russia	Severstal Cherepovets (KHL)
7	219	Joel Nystrom	D	Sweden	Farjestad BK (SHL)
