= 2021–22 Minnesota Wild season =

Professional ice hockey team season of play

2021–22 Minnesota Wild
- Division: 2nd Central
- Conference: 2nd Western
- 2021–22 record: 53–22–7
- Home record: 31–8–2
- Road record: 22–14–5
- Goals for: 310
- Goals against: 253

Team information
- General manager: Bill Guerin
- Coach: Dean Evason
- Captain: Jared Spurgeon
- Alternate captains: Matt Dumba; Marcus Foligno
- Arena: Xcel Energy Center
- Average attendance: 18,542
- Minor league affiliates: Iowa Wild (AHL); Iowa Heartlanders (ECHL)

Team leaders
- Goals: Kirill Kaprizov (47)
- Assists: Kirill Kaprizov (61)
- Points: Kirill Kaprizov (108)
- Penalty minutes: Brandon Duhaime (122)
- Plus/minus: Alex Goligoski (+41)
- Wins: Cam Talbot (32)
- Goals against average: Marc-Andre Fleury (2.74)

The 2021–22 Minnesota Wild season was the 22nd season for the National Hockey League (NHL) franchise that was established on June 25, 1997. The Wild clinched a playoff spot after a 5–4 overtime win against the San Jose Sharks, which would be their ninth postseason appearance in the last 10 seasons. Despite setting franchise records in wins (53), and points (113), the Wild were upset in the first round by the St. Louis Blues, losing in six games.

== Standings ==
=== Divisional standings ===
Central Division
Pos	Team	GP	W	L	OTL	RW	GF	GA	GD	Pts
1	z – Colorado Avalanche	82	56	19	7	46	312	234	+78	119
2	x – Minnesota Wild	82	53	22	7	37	310	253	+57	113
3	x – St. Louis Blues	82	49	22	11	43	311	242	+69	109
4	x – Dallas Stars	82	46	30	6	31	238	246	−8	98
5	x – Nashville Predators	82	45	30	7	35	266	252	+14	97
6	Winnipeg Jets	82	39	32	11	31	252	257	−5	89
7	Chicago Blackhawks	82	28	42	12	16	219	291	−72	68
8	Arizona Coyotes	82	25	50	7	18	207	313	−106	57

Source: National Hockey League
Rules for classification: 1) Fewer number of games played (GP, only during regular season); 2) Greater number of regulation wins (RW); 3) Greater number of wins in regulation and overtime, excluding shootout wins (ROW); 4) Greater number of total wins, including shootouts (W); 5) Greater number of points earned in head-to-head play; if teams played an uneven number of head-to-head games, the result of the first game on the home ice of the team with the extra home game is discarded; 6) Greater goal differential (GD); 7) Greater number of goals scored (GF)
x – Clinched playoff spot; z – Clinched conference

=== Conference standings ===
Western Conference Wild Card
Pos	Div	Team	GP	W	L	OTL	RW	GF	GA	GD	Pts
1	CE	x – Dallas Stars	82	46	30	6	31	238	246	−8	98
2	CE	x – Nashville Predators	82	45	30	7	35	266	252	+14	97
3	PA	Vegas Golden Knights	82	43	31	8	34	266	248	+18	94
4	PA	Vancouver Canucks	82	40	30	12	32	249	236	+13	92
5	CE	Winnipeg Jets	82	39	32	11	32	252	257	−5	89
6	PA	San Jose Sharks	82	32	37	13	22	214	264	−50	77
7	PA	Anaheim Ducks	82	31	37	14	22	232	271	−39	76
8	CE	Chicago Blackhawks	82	28	42	12	16	219	291	−72	68
9	PA	Seattle Kraken	82	27	49	6	23	216	285	−69	60
10	CE	Arizona Coyotes	82	25	50	7	18	207	313	−106	57

Source: National Hockey League
Rules for classification: 1) Fewer number of games played (GP, only during regular season); 2) Greater number of regulation wins (RW); 3) Greater number of wins in regulation and overtime, excluding shootout wins (ROW); 4) Greater number of total wins, including shootouts (W); 5) Greater number of points earned in head-to-head play; if teams played an uneven number of head-to-head games, the result of the first game on the home ice of the team with the extra home game is discarded; 6) Greater goal differential (GD); 7) Greater number of goals scored (GF)
x – Clinched playoff spot

== Schedule and results ==
=== Regular season ===
The regular season schedule was released on July 22, 2021, with only about a handful of games scheduled in February because NHL players are planning to participate in the 2022 Winter Olympics. Ultimately, due to a surge in the COVID-19 pandemic, NHL players did not go to the Olympics, and the planned break in February was used to reschedule some games that had been postponed due to outbreaks of COVID-19 throughout the league in December and January.

2021–22 game log

October: 5–3–0 (home: 2–1–0; road: 3–2–0)
#	Date	Visitor	Score	Home	OT	Decision	Attendance	Record	Pts	Recap
1	October 15	Minnesota	2–1	Anaheim		Talbot	11,938	1–0–0	2
2	October 16	Minnesota	3–2	Los Angeles		Talbot	12,590	2–0–0	4
3	October 19	Winnipeg	5–6	Minnesota	OT	Talbot	18,156	3–0–0	6
4	October 23	Anaheim	3–4	Minnesota	OT	Talbot	18,055	4–0–0	8
5	October 24	Nashville	5–2	Minnesota		Kahkonen	16,014	4–1–0	8
6	October 26	Minnesota	3–2	Vancouver		Talbot	18,870	5–1–0	10
7	October 28	Minnesota	1–4	Seattle		Talbot	17,151	5–2–0	10
8	October 30	Minnesota	1–4	Colorado		Talbot	17,708	5–3–0	10

November: 10–3–1 (home: 6–1–0; road: 4–2–1)
#	Date	Visitor	Score	Home	OT	Decision	Attendance	Record	Pts	Recap
9	November 2	Ottawa	4–5	Minnesota	OT	Talbot	15,276	6–3–0	12
10	November 6	Minnesota	5–4	Pittsburgh	SO	Talbot	17,181	7–3–0	14
11	November 7	NY Islanders	2–5	Minnesota		Kahkonen	15,547	8–3–0	16
12	November 10	Minnesota	5–2	Arizona		Kahkonen	13,488	9–3–0	18
13	November 11	Minnesota	2–3	Vegas		Talbot	18,267	9–4–0	18
14	November 13	Minnesota	4–2	Seattle		Talbot	17,151	10–4–0	20
15	November 16	San Jose	4–1	Minnesota		Talbot	15,367	10–5–0	20
16	November 18	Dallas	2–7	Minnesota		Talbot	17,088	11–5–0	22
17	November 20	Minnesota	4–5	Florida		Talbot	13,854	11–6–0	22
18	November 21	Minnesota	4–5	Tampa Bay	SO	Kahkonen	19,092	11–6–1	23
19	November 24	Minnesota	3–2	New Jersey	SO	Talbot	14,763	12–6–1	25
20	November 26	Winnipeg	1–7	Minnesota		Talbot	19,113	13–6–1	27
21	November 28	Tampa Bay	2–4	Minnesota		Talbot	17,785	14–6–1	29
22	November 30	Arizona	2–5	Minnesota		Kahkonen	16,239	15–6–1	31

December: 4–3–1 (home: 2–0–1; road: 2–3–0)
#	Date	Visitor	Score	Home	OT	Decision	Attendance	Record	Pts	Recap
23	December 2	New Jersey	2–5	Minnesota		Kahkonen	16,112	16–6–1	33
24	December 4	Toronto	3–4	Minnesota	SO	Talbot	18,568	17–6–1	35
25	December 7	Minnesota	4–1	Edmonton		Talbot	14,715	18–6–1	37
26	December 9	Minnesota	5–2	San Jose		Talbot	10,782	19–6–1	39
27	December 11	Minnesota	1–2	Los Angeles		Kahkonen	15,897	19–7–1	39
28	December 12	Minnesota	4–6	Vegas		Talbot	18,001	19–8–1	39
—	December 14	Carolina	–	Minnesota	Postponed due to COVID-19.
29	December 16	Buffalo	3–2	Minnesota	SO	Talbot	18,022	19–8–2	40
—	December 18	Florida	–	Minnesota	Postponed due to COVID-19.
30	December 20	Minnesota	4–7	Dallas		Talbot	18,237	19–9–2	40
—	December 23	Detroit	–	Minnesota	Postponed due to COVID-19.
—	December 27	Minnesota	–	Winnipeg	Postponed due to COVID-19.

January: 8–1–1 (home: 4–1–0; road: 4–0–1)
#	Date	Visitor	Score	Home	OT	Decision	Attendance	Record	Pts	Recap
31	January 1	St. Louis	6–4	Minnesota		Talbot	38,619 (outdoors)	19–10–2	40
—	January 3	Minnesota	–	Ottawa	Postponed due to COVID-19.
32	January 6	Minnesota	3–2	Boston		Kahkonen	17,850	20–10–2	42
33	January 8	Washington	2–3	Minnesota	SO	Kahkonen	19,078	21–10–2	44
—	January 10	Minnesota	–	Winnipeg	Postponed due to COVID-19.
—	January 12	Minnesota	–	Edmonton	Postponed due to COVID-19.
34	January 14	Anaheim	3–7	Minnesota		Kahkonen	18,300	22–10–2	46
35	January 17	Minnesota	3–4	Colorado	SO	Kahkonen	17,565	22–10–3	47
36	January 21	Minnesota	5–1	Chicago		Kahkonen	17,921	23–10–3	49
37	January 22	Chicago	3–4	Minnesota	OT	Kahkonen	19,092	24–10–3	51
38	January 24	Montreal	2–8	Minnesota		Talbot	18,104	25–10–3	53
39	January 28	Minnesota	3–2	NY Rangers		Talbot	18,006	26–10–3	55
40	January 30	Minnesota	4–3	NY Islanders		Kahkonen	15,518	27–10–3	57

February: 4–6–0 (home: 2–1–0; road: 2–5–0)
#	Date	Visitor	Score	Home	OT	Decision	Attendance	Record	Pts	Recap
41	February 2	Minnesota	5–0	Chicago		Talbot	16,373	28–10–3	59
42	February 8	Minnesota	0–2	Winnipeg		Kahkonen	7,012	28–11–3	59
43	February 12	Carolina	2–3	Minnesota		Talbot	18,802	29–11–3	61
44	February 14	Detroit	4–7	Minnesota		Kahkonen	18,098	30–11–3	63
45	February 16	Minnesota	3–6	Winnipeg		Talbot	12,527	30–12–3	63
46	February 18	Florida	6–2	Minnesota		Talbot	18,300	30–13–3	63
47	February 20	Minnesota	7–3	Edmonton		Kahkonen	9,150	31–13–3	65
48	February 22	Minnesota	3–4	Ottawa		Talbot	7,602	31–14–3	65
49	February 24	Minnesota	1–3	Toronto		Kahkonen	9,410	31–15–3	65
50	February 26	Minnesota	3–7	Calgary		Kahkonen	9,639	31–16–3	65

March: 10–4–2 (home: 8–3–1; road: 2–1–1)
#	Date	Visitor	Score	Home	OT	Decision	Attendance	Record	Pts	Recap
51	March 1	Calgary	5–1	Minnesota		Talbot	16,998	31–17–3	65
52	March 3	Minnesota	5–4	Philadelphia		Talbot	13,876	32–17–3	67
53	March 4	Minnesota	4–5	Buffalo		Kahkonen	8,462	32–18–3	67
54	March 6	Dallas	6–3	Minnesota		Kahkonen	18,791	32–19–3	67
55	March 8	NY Rangers	2–5	Minnesota		Talbot	18,356	33–19–3	69
56	March 10	Minnesota	6–5	Detroit	SO	Talbot	17,461	34–19–3	71
57	March 11	Minnesota	2–3	Columbus	SO	Kahkonen	16,399	34–19–4	72
58	March 13	Nashville	6–2	Minnesota		Kahkonen	19,009	34–20–4	72
59	March 16	Boston	2–4	Minnesota		Talbot	17,956	35–20–4	74
60	March 19	Chicago	1–3	Minnesota		Talbot	19,226	36–20–4	76
61	March 21	Vegas	0–3	Minnesota		Talbot	17,498	37–20–4	78
62	March 24	Vancouver	2–3	Minnesota	OT	Talbot	17,333	38–20–4	80
63	March 26	Columbus	2–3	Minnesota	OT	Fleury	19,089	39–20–4	82
64	March 27	Colorado	2–3	Minnesota	OT	Talbot	19,140	40–20–4	84
65	March 29	Philadelphia	1–4	Minnesota		Fleury	17,874	41–20–4	86
66	March 31	Pittsburgh	4–3	Minnesota	OT	Talbot	18,978	41–20–5	87

April: 12–2–2 (home: 7–1–0; road: 5–1–2)
#	Date	Visitor	Score	Home	OT	Decision	Attendance	Record	Pts	Recap
67	April 2	Minnesota	3–1	Carolina		Fleury	16,375	42–20–5	89
68	April 3	Minnesota	5–1	Washington		Talbot	18,573	43–20–5	91
69	April 5	Minnesota	2–6	Nashville		Fleury	17,244	43–21–5	91
70	April 8	Minnesota	3–4	St. Louis	OT	Talbot	18,096	43–21–6	92
71	April 10	Los Angeles	3–6	Minnesota		Fleury	19,104	44–21–6	94
72	April 12	Edmonton	1–5	Minnesota		Talbot	19,035	45–21–6	96
73	April 14	Minnesota	3–2	Dallas	OT	Fleury	18,110	46–21–6	98
74	April 16	Minnesota	5–6	St. Louis	OT	Talbot	18,096	46–21–7	99
75	April 17	San Jose	4–5	Minnesota	OT	Fleury	19,029	47–21–7	101
76	April 19	Minnesota	2–0	Montreal		Talbot	20,725	48–21–7	103
77	April 21	Vancouver	3–6	Minnesota		Talbot	17,894	49–21–7	105
78	April 22	Seattle	3–6	Minnesota		Fleury	19,047	50–21–7	107
79	April 24	Minnesota	5–4	Nashville	OT	Fleury	17,160	51–21–7	109
80	April 26	Arizona	5–3	Minnesota		Fleury	18,383	51–22–7	109
81	April 28	Calgary	2–3	Minnesota	OT	Talbot	18,490	52–22–7	111
82	April 29	Colorado	1–4	Minnesota		Fleury	19,261	53–22–7	113

Legend: Win (2 points) Loss (0 points) Overtime/shootout loss (1 point)

=== Playoffs ===
2022 Stanley Cup playoffs

Western Conference first round vs. (C3) St. Louis Blues: St. Louis won 4–2
#	Date	Visitor	Score	Home	OT	Decision	Attendance	Series	Recap
1	May 2	St. Louis	4–0	Minnesota		Fleury	19,053	0–1
2	May 4	St. Louis	2–6	Minnesota		Fleury	19,376	1–1
3	May 6	Minnesota	5–1	St. Louis		Fleury	18,096	2–1
4	May 8	Minnesota	2–5	St. Louis		Fleury	18,096	2–2
5	May 10	St. Louis	5–2	Minnesota		Fleury	19,197	2–3
6	May 12	Minnesota	1–5	St. Louis		Talbot	18,096	2–4

Legend: Win Loss

== Player statistics ==
As of May 13, 2022

=== Skaters ===
Regular season
Player	GP	G	A	Pts	+/−	PIM
Kirill Kaprizov	81	47	61	108	+27	34
Kevin Fiala	82	33	52	85	+23	52
Mats Zuccarello	70	24	55	79	+21	24
Ryan Hartman	82	34	31	65	+31	95
Joel Eriksson Ek	77	26	23	49	+16	28
Frederick Gaudreau	76	14	30	44	+12	8
Marcus Foligno	74	23	19	42	+25	112
Jared Spurgeon	65	10	30	40	+32	10
Matthew Boldy	47	15	24	39	+17	10
Jonas Brodin	73	5	25	30	+9	18
Alex Goligoski	72	2	28	30	+41	34
Jordan Greenway	62	10	17	27	+26	69
Matt Dumba	57	7	20	27	+9	47
Dmitry Kulikov	80	7	17	24	+23	39
Jon Merrill	69	4	16	20	+15	22
Nico Sturm^{‡}	53	9	8	17	−5	8
Brandon Duhaime	80	6	11	17	−2	122
Nick Bjugstad	57	7	6	13	−2	20
Victor Rask^{‡}	29	5	8	13	+7	2
Rem Pitlick^{‡}	20	6	5	11	+1	12
Jordie Benn	39	1	7	8	+1	10
Tyson Jost^{†}	21	2	4	6	0	4
Connor Dewar	35	2	4	6	−4	25
Jacob Middleton^{†}	21	1	4	5	+7	13
Calen Addison	15	2	2	4	−4	2
Nicolas Deslauriers^{†}	20	3	0	3	−2	23
Joseph Cramarossa	1	0	1	1	0	2
Adam Beckman	3	0	1	1	−1	2
Kyle Rau	5	0	0	0	−3	0
Dakota Mermis	2	0	0	0	+2	0
Mason Shaw	3	0	0	0	−2	5
Jon Lizotte	1	0	0	0	0	2
Mitchell Chaffee	2	0	0	0	+1	0
Marco Rossi	2	0	0	0	−1	4

Playoffs
Player	GP	G	A	Pts	+/−	PIM
Kirill Kaprizov	6	7	1	8	1	2
Joel Eriksson Ek	6	3	2	5	1	8
Ryan Hartman	6	0	5	5	0	2
Mats Zuccarello	6	1	3	4	−1	2
Jonas Brodin	6	1	2	3	−2	2
Jared Spurgeon	6	0	3	3	1	4
Kevin Fiala	6	0	3	3	−5	16
Jordan Greenway	6	1	1	2	0	6
Marcus Foligno	6	0	2	2	1	14
Matt Dumba	6	1	0	1	4	2
Frederick Gaudreau	6	1	0	1	−1	0
Matthew Boldy	6	1	0	1	−1	4
Jon Merrill	6	0	1	1	−6	0
Jacob Middleton	6	0	1	1	6	2
Dmitry Kulikov	2	0	1	1	−4	2
Tyson Jost	6	0	0	0	0	4
Brandon Duhaime	6	0	0	0	−2	2
Nicolas Deslauriers	5	0	0	0	−3	0
Alex Goligoski	4	0	0	0	−3	2
Connor Dewar	1	0	0	0	0	0

=== Goaltenders ===
Regular season
Player	GP	GS	TOI	W	L	OT	GA	GAA	SA	SV%	SO	G	A	PIM
Cam Talbot	49	48	2,864:23	32	12	4	132	2.76	1,488	.911	3	0	1	2
Kaapo Kahkonen^{‡}	25	23	1,380:05	12	8	3	66	2.87	734	.910	0	0	1	2
Marc-Andre Fleury^{†}	11	11	657:54	9	2	0	30	2.74	334	.910	0	0	1	0

Playoffs
Player	GP	GS	TOI	W	L	GA	GAA	SA	SV%	SO	G	A	PIM
Marc-Andre Fleury	5	5	296:28	2	3	15	3.04	159	.906	0	0	0	0
Cam Talbot	1	1	57:53	0	1	4	4.14	26	.846	0	0	0	0

^{†}Denotes player spent time with another team before joining the Wild. Stats reflect time with the Wild only.
^{‡}Denotes player was traded mid-season. Stats reflect time with the Wild only.
Bold/italics denotes franchise record.

== Transactions ==
The Wild have been involved in the following transactions during the 2021–22 season.

=== Trades ===
Date	Details		Ref
July 23, 2021	To Edmonton Oilers 1st-round pick in 2021; PIT 3rd-round pick in 2021	To Minnesota Wild 1st-round pick in 2021	
July 24, 2021	To Montreal Canadiens 5th-round pick in 2021; 7th-round pick in 2021	To Minnesota Wild 4th-round pick in 2021	
July 28, 2021	To Toronto Maple Leafs Brennan Menell	To Minnesota Wild Conditional^{1} 7th-round pick in 2022	
December 29, 2021	To St. Louis Blues Will Bitten	To Minnesota Wild Nolan Stevens	
February 12, 2022	To Montreal Canadiens Andrew Hammond	To Minnesota Wild Brandon Baddock	
March 15, 2022	To Colorado Avalanche Nico Sturm	To Minnesota Wild Tyson Jost	
March 19, 2022	To Anaheim Ducks 3rd-round pick in 2023	To Minnesota Wild Nicolas Deslauriers	
March 20, 2022	To Arizona Coyotes Jack McBain	To Minnesota Wild VAN 2nd-round pick in 2022	
March 21, 2022	To San Jose Sharks Kaapo Kahkonen; 5th-round pick in 2022	To Minnesota Wild Jacob Middleton	
March 21, 2022	To Chicago Blackhawks Conditional^{2} 2nd-round pick in 2022	To Minnesota Wild Marc-Andre Fleury	
June 29, 2022	To Los Angeles Kings Kevin Fiala	To Minnesota Wild Brock Faber; 1st-round pick in 2022	

Notes:

1. Minnesota will receive a 7th-round pick in 2022 if Mennell plays 30 games for Toronto in 2021–22; otherwise no pick will be exchanged.
2. Chicago will receive Minnesota's 1st-round pick in 2022 if they reach the 2022 Western Conference Final and Fleury has at least four wins in the first two rounds; otherwise they will receive a 2nd-round pick.

=== Players acquired ===
Date	Player	Former team	Term	Via	Ref
July 28, 2021	Frederick Gaudreau	Pittsburgh Penguins	2-year	Free agency	
July 28, 2021	Alex Goligoski	Arizona Coyotes	1-year	Free agency	
July 28, 2021	Joe Hicketts	Detroit Red Wings	2-year	Free agency	
July 28, 2021	Dmitry Kulikov	Edmonton Oilers	2-year	Free agency	
July 28, 2021	Jon Lizotte	Wilkes-Barre/Scranton Penguins (AHL)	1-year	Free agency	
July 28, 2021	Dominic Turgeon	Detroit Red Wings	1-year	Free agency	
July 29, 2021	Kevin Czuczman	Pittsburgh Penguins	1-year	Free agency	
July 29, 2021	Jon Merrill	Montreal Canadiens	1-year	Free agency	
August 27, 2021	Jordie Benn	Winnipeg Jets	1-year	Free agency	
October 5, 2021	Rem Pitlick	Nashville Predators		Waivers	
January 4, 2022	Zane McIntyre	Tucson Roadrunners (AHL)	1-year	Free agency	

=== Players lost ===
Date	Player	New team	Term	Via	Ref
July 13, 2021	Zach Parise	New York Islanders	1-year	Buy-out	
July 13, 2021	Ryan Suter	Dallas Stars	4-year	Buy-out	
July 21, 2021	Carson Soucy	Seattle Kraken		Expansion draft	
July 28, 2021	Louie Belpedio	Montreal Canadiens	1-year	Free agency	
July 28, 2021	Nick Bonino	San Jose Sharks	2-year	Free agency	
July 28, 2021	Ian Cole	Carolina Hurricanes	1-year	Free agency	
July 28, 2021	Gabriel Dumont	Tampa Bay Lightning	1-year	Free agency	
July 28, 2021	Brad Hunt	Vancouver Canucks	1-year	Free agency	
July 28, 2021	Luke Johnson	Winnipeg Jets	1-year	Free agency	
July 28, 2021	Gerald Mayhew	Philadelphia Flyers	1-year	Free agency	
July 28, 2021	Ryan Suter	Dallas Stars	4-year	Free agency	
August 6, 2021	Marcus Johansson	Seattle Kraken	1-year	Free agency	
October 2, 2021	Matt Bartkowski	Wilkes-Barre/Scranton Penguins (AHL)	1-year	Free agency	
November 24, 2021	Ivan Lodnia			Contract termination	
November 24, 2021	Ivan Lodnia	Chicago Wolves (AHL)	1-year	Free agency	
January 12, 2022	Rem Pitlick	Montreal Canadiens		Waivers	
June 23, 2022	Kevin Czuczman	Ilves (Liiga)	1-year	Free agency	

=== Signings ===
Date	Player	Term	Contract type	Ref
July 18, 2021	Joseph Cramarossa	2-year	Re-signing	
July 26, 2021	Andrew Hammond	1-year	Re-signing	
July 27, 2021	Dakota Mermis	2-year	Re-signing	
July 27, 2021	Kyle Rau	1-year	Re-signing	
July 29, 2021	Brandon Duhaime	2-year	Re-signing	
August 8, 2021	Will Bitten	1-year	Re-signing	
August 16, 2021	Kevin Fiala	1-year	Re-signing	
August 17, 2021	Mason Shaw	2-year	Re-signing	
August 25, 2021	Carson Lambos	3-year	Entry-level	
September 21, 2021	Kirill Kaprizov	5-year	Re-signing	
January 11, 2022	Jon Merrill	3-year	Extension	
January 31, 2022	Jordan Greenway	3-year	Extension	
March 23, 2022	Vladislav Firstov	3-year	Entry-level	
March 29, 2022	Sam Hentges	2-year	Entry-level	
March 30, 2022	Alex Goligoski	2-year	Extension	
April 28, 2022	Simon Johansson	2-year	Extension	
May 9, 2022	Pavel Novak	3-year	Entry-level	
May 16, 2022	Jesper Wallstedt	3-year	Entry-level	
June 22, 2022	Connor Dewar	2-year	Extension	
July 6, 2022	Jacob Middleton	3-year	Extension	

== Draft picks ==
Below are the Minnesota Wild's selections at the 2021 NHL entry draft, which were held on July 23 to 24, 2021. It was held virtually via Video conference call from the NHL Network studio in Secaucus, New Jersey.

Round	#	Player	Pos.	Nationality	Team (League)
1	20	Jesper Wallstedt	G	Sweden	Lulea HF (SHL)
1	26	Carson Lambos	D	Canada	JYP U20 (U20 SM-sarja)
2	54	Jack Peart	D	USA	Fargo Force (USHL)
3	86	Caedan Bankier	C	Canada	Kamloops Blazers (WHL)
4	118	Kyle Masters	D	Canada	Red Deer Rebels (WHL)
4	127	Josh Pillar	RW	Canada	Kamloops Blazers (WHL)
6	182	Nate Benoit		USA	Mount St. Charles Mounties (USHS-RI)
