= 2021–22 Toronto Maple Leafs season =

National Hockey League season

2021–22 Toronto Maple Leafs
- Division: 2nd Atlantic
- Conference: 3rd Eastern
- 2021–22 record: 54–21–7
- Home record: 31–8–2
- Road record: 23–13–5
- Goals for: 315
- Goals against: 253

Team information
- General manager: Kyle Dubas
- Coach: Sheldon Keefe
- Captain: John Tavares
- Alternate captains: Mitch Marner; Auston Matthews; Jake Muzzin; Morgan Rielly
- Arena: Scotiabank Arena
- Average attendance: 15,586
- Minor league affiliates: Toronto Marlies (AHL); Newfoundland Growlers (ECHL)

Team leaders
- Goals: Auston Matthews (60)
- Assists: Mitch Marner (62)
- Points: Auston Matthews (106)
- Penalty minutes: Wayne Simmonds (96)
- Plus/minus: Michael Bunting (+27)
- Wins: Jack Campbell (31)
- Goals against average: Jack Campbell (2.64)

The 2021–22 Toronto Maple Leafs season was the 105th season for the National Hockey League (NHL) franchise that was established on November 22, 1917. On April 9, 2022, the Maple Leafs clinched a playoff spot for the sixth year in a row with a 3–2 win against the Montreal Canadiens. With a 4–2 win over the New York Islanders on April 17, the Maple Leafs set franchise records in both wins (50) and points (106). The Maple Leafs qualified for the playoffs for the sixth consecutive season, but they were upset in the first round by the two-time defending Stanley Cup champion Tampa Bay Lightning, losing in seven games, despite leading the series 3–2 with a 3–2 lead after the 2nd period of Game 6. After the Florida Panthers won a playoff series for the first time since 1996, Toronto held the NHL's longest active playoff series win drought, not having won a playoff series since 2004.

== Standings ==
Atlantic Division
Pos	Team	GP	W	L	OTL	RW	GF	GA	GD	Pts
1	p – Florida Panthers	82	58	18	6	42	340	246	+94	122
2	x – Toronto Maple Leafs	82	54	21	7	45	315	253	+62	115
3	x – Tampa Bay Lightning	82	51	23	8	39	287	233	+54	110
4	x – Boston Bruins	82	51	26	5	40	255	220	+35	107
5	Buffalo Sabres	82	32	39	11	25	232	290	−58	75
6	Detroit Red Wings	82	32	40	10	21	230	312	−82	74
7	Ottawa Senators	82	33	42	7	26	227	266	−39	73
8	Montreal Canadiens	82	22	49	11	16	221	319	−98	55

Source: National Hockey League
Rules for classification: 1) Fewer number of games played (GP, only during regular season); 2) Greater number of regulation wins (RW); 3) Greater number of wins in regulation and overtime, excluding shootout wins (ROW); 4) Greater number of total wins, including shootouts (W); 5) Greater number of points earned in head-to-head play; if teams played an uneven number of head-to-head games, the result of the first game on the home ice of the team with the extra home game is discarded; 6) Greater goal differential (GD); 7) Greater number of goals scored (GF)
p – Clinched Presidents' Trophy; x – Clinched playoff spot

Eastern Conference Wild Card
Pos	Div	Team	GP	W	L	OTL	RW	GF	GA	GD	Pts
1	AT	x – Boston Bruins	82	51	26	5	40	255	220	+35	107
2	ME	x – Washington Capitals	82	44	26	12	35	275	245	+30	100
3	ME	New York Islanders	82	37	35	10	34	231	237	−6	84
4	ME	Columbus Blue Jackets	82	37	38	7	26	262	300	−38	81
5	AT	Buffalo Sabres	82	32	39	11	25	232	290	−58	75
6	AT	Detroit Red Wings	82	32	40	10	21	230	312	−82	74
7	AT	Ottawa Senators	82	33	42	7	26	227	266	−39	73
8	ME	New Jersey Devils	82	27	46	9	19	248	307	−59	63
9	ME	Philadelphia Flyers	82	25	46	11	20	211	298	−87	61
10	AT	Montreal Canadiens	82	22	49	11	16	221	319	−98	55

Source: National Hockey League
Rules for classification: 1) Fewer number of games played (GP, only during regular season); 2) Greater number of regulation wins (RW); 3) Greater number of wins in regulation and overtime, excluding shootout wins (ROW); 4) Greater number of total wins, including shootouts (W); 5) Greater number of points earned in head-to-head play; if teams played an uneven number of head-to-head games, the result of the first game on the home ice of the team with the extra home game is discarded; 6) Greater goal differential (GD); 7) Greater number of goals scored (GF)
x – Clinched playoff spot

== Schedule and results ==
=== Preseason ===
2021 preseason: 5–1–0 (home: 3–0–0; road: 2–1–0)

Game	Date	Opponent	Score	OT	Decision	Location	Attendance	Record	Recap
1	September 25	Montreal Canadiens	4–1		Hutchinson (1–0–0)	Scotiabank Arena	—	1–0–0	
2	September 27	@ Montreal Canadiens	2–5		Campbell (0–1–0)	Bell Centre	7,500	1–1–0	
3	September 29	@ Ottawa Senators	4–0		Mrazek (1–0–0)	Canadian Tire Centre	—	2–1–0	
4	October 4	@ Ottawa Senators	3–1		Campbell (1–1–0)	Canadian Tire Centre	—	3–1–0	
5	October 5	Montreal Canadiens	6–2		Mrazek (2–0–0)	Scotiabank Arena	—	4–1–0	
6	October 9	Ottawa Senators	4–1		Campbell (2–1–0)	Scotiabank Arena	—	5–1–0	

=== Regular season ===
2021–22 game log: 54–21–7, 115 points (home: 31–8–2; road: 23–13–5)
October: 4–4–1, 9 points (home: 3–1–1; road: 1–3–0)

Game	Date	Opponent	Score	OT	Decision	Location	Attendance	Record	Points	Recap
1	October 13	Montreal Canadiens	2–1		Campbell (1–0–0)	Scotiabank Arena	18,493	1–0–0	2	
2	October 14	@ Ottawa Senators	2–3		Mrazek (0–1–0)	Canadian Tire Centre	15,159	1–1–0	2	
3	October 16	Ottawa Senators	3–1		Campbell (2–0–0)	Scotiabank Arena	18,211	2–1–0	4	
4	October 18	New York Rangers	1–2	OT	Campbell (2–0–1)	Scotiabank Arena	18,098	2–1–1	5	
5	October 22	San Jose Sharks	3–5		Hutchinson (0–1–0)	Scotiabank Arena	18,603	2–2–1	5	
6	October 23	@ Pittsburgh Penguins	1–7		Campbell (2–1–1)	PPG Paints Arena	15,397	2–3–1	5	
7	October 25	@ Carolina Hurricanes	1–4		Campbell (2–2–1)	PNC Arena	14,011	2–4–1	5	
8	October 27	@ Chicago Blackhawks	3–2	OT	Campbell (3–2–1)	United Center	18,616	3–4–1	7	
9	October 30	Detroit Red Wings	5–4		Mrazek (1–1–0)	Scotiabank Arena	18,921	4–4–1	9	

November: 12–2–0, 24 points (home: 6–2–0; road: 6–0–0)

Game	Date	Opponent	Score	OT	Decision	Location	Attendance	Record	Points	Recap
10	November 2	Vegas Golden Knights	4–0		Campbell (4–2–1)	Scotiabank Arena	18,689	5–4–1	11	
11	November 4	Tampa Bay Lightning	2–1	OT	Campbell (5–2–1)	Scotiabank Arena	18,937	6–4–1	13	
12	November 6	Boston Bruins	5–2		Campbell (6–2–1)	Scotiabank Arena	19,077	7–4–1	15	
13	November 8	Los Angeles Kings	1–5		Campbell (6–3–1)	Scotiabank Arena	18,983	7–5–1	15	
14	November 10	@ Philadelphia Flyers	3–0		Campbell (7–3–1)	Wells Fargo Center	17,997	8–5–1	17	
15	November 12	Calgary Flames	2–1	OT	Campbell (8–3–1)	Scotiabank Arena	18,826	9–5–1	19	
16	November 13	@ Buffalo Sabres	5–4		Woll (1–0–0)	KeyBank Center	7,992	10–5–1	21	
17	November 16	Nashville Predators	3–0		Campbell (9–3–1)	Scotiabank Arena	18,949	11–5–1	23	
18	November 18	New York Rangers	2–1		Campbell (10–3–1)	Scotiabank Arena	19,029	12–5–1	25	
19	November 20	Pittsburgh Penguins	0–2		Campbell (10–4–1)	Scotiabank Arena	19,531	12–6–1	25	
20	November 21	@ New York Islanders	3–0		Woll (2–0–0)	UBS Arena	17,255	13–6–1	27	
21	November 24	@ Los Angeles Kings	6–2		Campbell (11–4–1)	Staples Center	15,166	14–6–1	29	
22	November 26	@ San Jose Sharks	4–1		Woll (3–0–0)	SAP Center	14,068	15–6–1	31	
23	November 28	@ Anaheim Ducks	5–1		Campbell (12–4–1)	Honda Center	13,664	16–6–1	33	

December: 4–2–1, 9 points (home: 3–1–0; road: 1–1–1)

Game	Date	Opponent	Score	OT	Decision	Location	Attendance	Record	Points	Recap
24	December 1	Colorado Avalanche	8–3		Campbell (13–4–1)	Scotiabank Arena	18,931	17–6–1	35	
25	December 4	@ Minnesota Wild	3–4	SO	Campbell (13–4–2)	Xcel Energy Center	18,568	17–6–2	36	
26	December 5	@ Winnipeg Jets	3–6		Woll (3–1–0)	Canada Life Centre	14,461	17–7–2	36	
27	December 7	Columbus Blue Jackets	5–4		Campbell (14–4–2)	Scotiabank Arena	18,793	18–7–2	38	
28	December 9	Tampa Bay Lightning	3–5		Campbell (14–5–2)	Scotiabank Arena	18,919	18–8–2	38	
29	December 11	Chicago Blackhawks	5–4		Mrazek (2–1–0)	Scotiabank Arena	18,934	19–8–2	40	
30	December 14	@ Edmonton Oilers	5–1		Campbell (15–5–2)	Rogers Place	18,131	20–8–2	42	
—	December 16	@ Calgary Flames	–	Postponed due to COVID-19. Rescheduled for February 10.						
—	December 18	@ Vancouver Canucks	–	Postponed due to COVID-19. Rescheduled for February 12.						
—	December 19	@ Seattle Kraken	–	Postponed due to COVID-19. Rescheduled for February 14.						
—	December 23	St. Louis Blues	–	Postponed due to COVID-19. Rescheduled for February 19.						
—	December 27	@ Columbus Blue Jackets	–	Postponed due to COVID-19. Rescheduled for February 22.						
—	December 29	Pittsburgh Penguins	–	Postponed due to COVID-19. Rescheduled for February 17.						

January: 8–2–1, 17 points (home: 4–0–0; road: 4–2–1)

Game	Date	Opponent	Score	OT	Decision	Location	Attendance	Record	Points	Recap
31	January 1	Ottawa Senators	6–0		Campbell (16–5–2)	Scotiabank Arena	989	21–8–2	44	
—	January 3	Carolina Hurricanes	–	Postponed due to attendance restrictions. Rescheduled for February 7.						
32	January 5	Edmonton Oilers	4–2		Campbell (17–5–2)	Scotiabank Arena	0	22–8–2	46	
—	January 6	@ Montreal Canadiens	–	Postponed due to attendance restrictions. Rescheduled for February 21.						
33	January 8	@ Colorado Avalanche	4–5	OT	Campbell (17–5–3)	Ball Arena	17,354	22–8–3	47	
34	January 11	@ Vegas Golden Knights	4–3	SO	Campbell (18–5–3)	T-Mobile Arena	17,911	23–8–3	49	
35	January 12	@ Arizona Coyotes	1–2		Mrazek (2–2–0)	Gila River Arena	10,031	23–9–3	49	
36	January 15	@ St. Louis Blues	6–5		Campbell (19–5–3)	Enterprise Center	18,096	24–9–3	51	
—	January 17	New Jersey Devils	–	Postponed due to attendance restrictions. Rescheduled for January 31						
37	January 19	@ New York Rangers	3–6		Campbell (19–6–3)	Madison Square Garden	16,624	24–10–3	51	
38	January 22	@ New York Islanders	3–1		Mrazek (3–2–0)	UBS Arena	17,255	25–10–3	53	
39	January 26	Anaheim Ducks	4–3	SO	Campbell (20–6–3)	Scotiabank Arena	0	26–10–3	55	
40	January 29	@ Detroit Red Wings	7–4		Mrazek (4–2–0)	Little Caesars Arena	19,515	27–10–3	57	
41	January 31	New Jersey Devils	6–4		Mrazek (5–2–0)	Scotiabank Arena	500	28–10–3	59	

February: 7–4–1, 15 points (home: 3–1–0; road: 4–3–1)

Game	Date	Opponent	Score	OT	Decision	Location	Attendance	Record	Points	Recap
42	February 1	@ New Jersey Devils	7–1		Campbell (21–6–3)	Prudential Center	11,602	29–10–3	61	
43	February 7	Carolina Hurricanes	4–3	OT	Mrazek (6–2–0)	Scotiabank Arena	500	30–10–3	63	
44	February 10	@ Calgary Flames	2–5		Campbell (21–7–3)	Scotiabank Saddledome	9,639	30–11–3	63	
45	February 12	@ Vancouver Canucks	2–3		Mrazek (6–3–0)	Rogers Arena	9,396	30–12–3	63	
46	February 14	@ Seattle Kraken	6–2		Campbell (22–7–3)	Climate Pledge Arena	17,151	31–12–3	65	
47	February 17	Pittsburgh Penguins	4–1		Campbell (23–7–3)	Scotiabank Arena	8,139	32–12–3	67	
48	February 19	St. Louis Blues	3–6		Campbell (23–8–3)	Scotiabank Arena	9,098	32–13–3	67	
49	February 21	@ Montreal Canadiens	2–5		Mrazek (6–4–0)	Bell Centre	10,552	32–14–3	67	
50	February 22	@ Columbus Blue Jackets	3–4	OT	Campbell (23–8–4)	Nationwide Arena	15,489	32–14–4	68	
51	February 24	Minnesota Wild	3–1		Mrazek (7–4–0)	Scotiabank Arena	9,410	33–14–4	70	
52	February 26	@ Detroit Red Wings	10–7		Mrazek (8–4–0)	Little Caesars Arena	18,791	34–14–4	72	
53	February 28	@ Washington Capitals	5–3		Mrazek (9–4–0)	Capital One Arena	18,573	35–14–4	74	

March: 8–5–1, 17 points (home: 6–2–1; road: 2–3–0)

Game	Date	Opponent	Score	OT	Decision	Location	Attendance	Record	Points	Recap
54	March 2	Buffalo Sabres	1–5		Mrazek (9–5–0)	Scotiabank Arena	17,122	35–15–4	74	
55	March 5	Vancouver Canucks	4–6		Campbell (23–9–4)	Scotiabank Arena	17,534	35–16–4	74	
56	March 7	@ Columbus Blue Jackets	5–4		Mrazek (10–5–0)	Nationwide Arena	14,252	36–16–4	76	
57	March 8	Seattle Kraken	6–4		Campbell (24–9–4)	Scotiabank Arena	17,547	37–16–4	78	
58	March 10	Arizona Coyotes	4–5	OT	Kallgren (0–0–1)	Scotiabank Arena	17,351	37–16–5	79	
59	March 13	@ Buffalo Sabres	2–5		Mrazek (10–6–0)	Tim Hortons Field	26,119 (outdoors)	37–17–5	79	
60	March 15	Dallas Stars	4–0		Kallgren (1–0–1)	Scotiabank Arena	18,543	38–17–5	81	
61	March 17	Carolina Hurricanes	3–2		Kallgren (2–0–1)	Scotiabank Arena	18,134	39–17–5	83	
62	March 19	@ Nashville Predators	3–6		Kallgren (2–1–1)	Bridgestone Arena	17,692	39–18–5	83	
63	March 23	New Jersey Devils	3–2		Mrazek (11–6–0)	Scotiabank Arena	18,739	40–18–5	85	
64	March 26	@ Montreal Canadiens	2–4		Kallgren (2–2–1)	Bell Centre	21,105	40–19–5	85	
65	March 27	Florida Panthers	5–2		Mrazek (12–6–0)	Scotiabank Arena	18,939	41–19–5	87	
66	March 29	@ Boston Bruins	6–4		Kallgren (3–2–1)	TD Garden	17,850	42–19–5	89	
67	March 31	Winnipeg Jets	7–3		Kallgren (4–2–1)	Scotiabank Arena	18,517	43–19–5	91	

April: 11–2–2, 24 points (home: 6–1–0; road: 5–1–2)

Game	Date	Opponent	Score	OT	Decision	Location	Attendance	Record	Points	Recap
68	April 2	@ Philadelphia Flyers	6–3		Campbell (25–9–4)	Wells Fargo Center	17,097	44–19–5	93	
69	April 4	@ Tampa Bay Lightning	6–2		Campbell (26–9–4)	Amalie Arena	19,092	45–19–5	95	
70	April 5	@ Florida Panthers	6–7	OT	Campbell (26–9–5)	FLA Live Arena	15,260	45–19–6	96	
71	April 7	@ Dallas Stars	4–3	OT	Campbell (27–9–5)	American Airlines Center	18,012	46–19–6	98	
72	April 9	Montreal Canadiens	3–2		Kallgren (5–2–1)	Scotiabank Arena	19,113	47–19–6	100	
73	April 12	Buffalo Sabres	2–5		Kallgren (5–3–1)	Scotiabank Arena	18,393	47–20–6	100	
74	April 14	Washington Capitals	7–3		Campbell (28–9–5)	Scotiabank Arena	18,466	48–20–6	102	
75	April 16	@ Ottawa Senators	5–4	OT	Kallgren (6–3–1)	Canadian Tire Centre	18,655	49–20–6	104	
76	April 17	New York Islanders	4–2		Campbell (29–9–5)	Scotiabank Arena	17,464	50–20–6	106	
77	April 19	Philadelphia Flyers	5–2		Campbell (30–9–5)	Scotiabank Arena	18,291	51–20–6	108	
78	April 21	@ Tampa Bay Lightning	1–8		Kallgren (6–4–1)	Amalie Arena	19,092	51–21–6	108	
79	April 23	@ Florida Panthers	2–3	OT	Campbell (30–9–6)	FLA Live Arena	17,132	51–21–7	109	
80	April 24	@ Washington Capitals	4–3	SO	Kallgren (7–4–1)	Capital One Arena	18,573	52–21–7	111	
81	April 26	Detroit Red Wings	3–0		Campbell (31–9–6)	Scotiabank Arena	18,107	53–21–7	113	
82	April 29	Boston Bruins	5–2		Kallgren (8–4–1)	Scotiabank Arena	18,219	54–21–7	115	

2021–22 schedule

Win (2 Points) Loss (0 points) Overtime/shootout loss (1 point)

=== Playoffs ===
2022 Stanley Cup playoffs
Eastern Conference First Round vs. (A3) Tampa Bay Lightning: Tampa Bay won 4–3

Game	Date	Opponent	Score	OT	Decision	Location	Attendance	Series	Recap
1	May 2	Tampa Bay Lightning	5–0		Campbell (1–0)	Scotiabank Arena	19,338	1–0	
2	May 4	Tampa Bay Lightning	3–5		Campbell (1–1)	Scotiabank Arena	19,135	1–1	
3	May 6	@ Tampa Bay Lightning	5–2		Campbell (2–1)	Amalie Arena	19,092	2–1	
4	May 8	@ Tampa Bay Lightning	3–7		Campbell (2–2)	Amalie Arena	19,092	2–2	
5	May 10	Tampa Bay Lightning	4–3		Campbell (3–2)	Scotiabank Arena	19,434	3–2	
6	May 12	@ Tampa Bay Lightning	3–4	OT	Campbell (3–3)	Amalie Arena	19,092	3–3	
7	May 14	Tampa Bay Lightning	1–2		Campbell (3–4)	Scotiabank Arena	19,316	3–4	

Win Loss

== Player statistics ==
=== Skaters ===
Regular season
Player	GP	G	A	Pts	+/−	PIM
Auston Matthews	73	60	46	106	20	18
Mitch Marner	72	35	62	97	23	16
William Nylander	81	34	46	80	−9	16
John Tavares	79	27	49	76	−8	32
Morgan Rielly	82	10	58	68	16	40
Michael Bunting	79	23	40	63	27	80
Alexander Kerfoot	82	13	38	51	19	20
Pierre Engvall	78	15	20	35	13	30
Ilya Mikheyev	53	21	11	32	16	26
T. J. Brodie	82	4	24	28	20	34
Ondrej Kase	50	14	13	27	4	14
David Kampf	82	11	15	26	12	20
Jason Spezza	71	12	13	25	−3	26
Timothy Liljegren	61	5	18	23	15	14
Justin Holl	69	3	20	23	14	41
Wayne Simmonds	72	5	11	16	−7	96
Rasmus Sandin	51	5	11	16	9	4
Jake Muzzin	47	3	11	14	−6	16
Mark Giordano ^{(p)}	20	2	10	12	12	10
Nick Ritchie ^{(X)}	33	2	7	9	−6	23
Ilya Lyubushkin ^{(p)}	31	2	4	6	4	25
Travis Dermott ^{(X)}	43	1	4	5	4	14
Colin Blackwell ^{(p)}	19	2	1	3	−1	10
Kyle Clifford ^{(p)}	23	1	2	3	−4	31
Carl Dahlstrom ^{(M)}	3	0	2	2	2	2
Nicholas Robertson ^{(M)}	10	1	0	1	−4	4
Nicholas Abruzzese	9	1	0	1	−1	2
Alex Steeves ^{(M)}	3	0	1	1	−1	0
Alex Biega ^{(X)}	2	0	0	0	−2	0
Michael Amadio ^{(X)}	3	0	0	0	1	0
Brett Seney ^{(M)}	2	0	0	0	0	0
Joey Anderson	5	0	0	0	0	0
Kristians Rubins ^{(M)}	3	0	0	0	−2	4
Kirill Semyonov ^{(X)}	3	0	0	0	−2	0

Playoffs
Player	GP	G	A	Pts	+/−	PIM
Auston Matthews	7	4	5	9	1	0
Mitch Marner	7	2	6	8	3	2
William Nylander	7	3	4	7	1	4
Morgan Rielly	7	3	3	6	0	17
John Tavares	7	3	3	6	0	2
Ilya Mikheyev	7	2	2	4	0	6
Jake Muzzin	7	2	1	3	4	2
Michael Bunting	6	1	2	3	−1	4
Ondrej Kase	7	0	3	3	−1	6
Pierre Engvall	7	0	3	3	0	14
David Kampf	7	2	0	2	3	6
Alexander Kerfoot	7	1	1	2	1	4
Colin Blackwell	7	1	1	2	−2	0
T. J. Brodie	7	0	2	2	5	6
Mark Giordano	7	0	2	2	0	6
Ilya Lyubushkin	7	0	1	1	−1	18
Justin Holl	5	0	1	1	2	6
Jason Spezza	5	0	1	1	−2	2
Timothy Liljegren	2	0	0	0	2	0
Kyle Clifford	1	0	0	0	0	15
Wayne Simmonds	2	0	0	0	−1	14

=== Goaltenders ===
Regular season
Player	GP	GS	TOI	W	L	OT	GA	GAA	SA	SV%	SO	G	A	PIM
Jack Campbell	49	47	2,795:24	31	9	6	123	2.64	1,430	.914	5	0	1	0
Petr Mrazek	20	18	1,042:07	12	6	0	58	3.34	520	.888	0	0	0	0
Erik Kallgren	14	12	779:29	8	4	1	43	3.31	385	.888	1	0	0	2
Joseph Woll ^{(M)}	4	4	239:54	3	1	0	11	2.75	123	.911	1	0	0	2
Michael Hutchinson ^{(M)}	2	1	78:43	0	1	0	6	4.57	42	.857	0	0	0	0

Playoffs
Player	GP	GS	TOI	W	L	GA	GAA	SA	SV%	SO	G	A	PIM
Jack Campbell	7	7	400:15	3	4	21	3.15	203	.897	1	0	0	0
Erik Kallgren	1	0	30:46	0	0	0	0.00	10	1.000	0	0	0	0

^{(M)} Player was playing for the minor league affiliate Toronto Marlies of the AHL at end of regular season
^{(X)} Player is no longer with the Maple Leafs organization
^{(p)} Player previously played with another team before being acquired by Toronto
Bold/italics denotes franchise record.

== Transactions ==
The Maple Leafs have been involved in the following transactions during the 2021–22 season.

=== Trades ===
Date	Details		Ref
July 17, 2021	To Pittsburgh Penguins Filip Hallander; 7th-round pick in 2023	To Toronto Maple Leafs Jared McCann	
July 26, 2021	To Boston Bruins J. D. Greenway	To Toronto Maple Leafs Future considerations	
July 28, 2021	To Minnesota Wild Conditional 7th-round pick in 2022^{[a]}	To Toronto Maple Leafs Brennan Menell	
November 16, 2021	To St. Louis Blues Future considerations	To Toronto Maple Leafs Kyle Clifford	
December 9, 2021	To Chicago Blackhawks Kurtis Gabriel	To Toronto Maple Leafs Chad Krys	
February 19, 2022	To Arizona Coyotes Nick Ritchie; Conditional 2nd-round pick in 2025 or 3rd-round pick in 2023	To Toronto Maple Leafs Ryan Dzingel; Ilya Lyubushkin	
February 21, 2022	To Arizona Coyotes Future considerations	To Toronto Maple Leafs Carter Hutton	
March 20, 2022	To Vancouver Canucks Travis Dermott	To Toronto Maple Leafs 3rd-round pick in 2022	
March 20, 2022	To Seattle Kraken 2nd-round pick in 2022; 2nd-round pick in 2023; 4th-round pick in 2024	To Toronto Maple Leafs Mark Giordano; Colin Blackwell	
March 21, 2022	To Nashville Predators Alex Biega	To Toronto Maple Leafs Future considerations	
March 23, 2022	To Philadelphia Flyers Brennan Menell	To Toronto Maple Leafs Future considerations	

==== Notes ====
- ^{[a]} Minnesota will receive a seventh-round pick in 2022 if Mennell plays 30 games for Toronto in 2021–22; otherwise no pick will be exchanged.

=== Players acquired ===
Date	Player	Former team	Term	Via	Ref
July 28, 2021	Alex Biega	Detroit Red Wings	1-year	Free agency	
July 28, 2021	Michael Bunting	Arizona Coyotes	2-year	Free agency	
July 28, 2021	Carl Dahlstrom	Vegas Golden Knights	1-year	Free agency	
July 28, 2021	Kurtis Gabriel	San Jose Sharks	1-year	Free agency	
July 28, 2021	David Kampf	Chicago Blackhawks	2-year	Free agency	
July 28, 2021	Petr Mrazek	Carolina Hurricanes	3-year	Free agency	
July 29, 2021	Michael Amadio	Ottawa Senators	1-year	Free agency	
July 29, 2021	Pavel Gogolev	Toronto Marlies (AHL)	3-year	Free agency	
July 29, 2021	Brett Seney	New Jersey Devils	1-year	Free agency	
July 30, 2021	Ondrej Kase	Boston Bruins	1-year	Free agency	
July 31, 2021	Nick Ritchie	Boston Bruins	2-year	Free agency	
October 1, 2021	Braeden Kressler	Flint Firebirds (OHL)	3-year	Entry-level	
February 16, 2022	Adam Brooks	Vegas Golden Knights		Waivers	
March 20, 2022	Harri Sateri	HC Sibir Novosibirsk (KHL)	1-year	Free agency	
March 22, 2022	Curtis Douglas	Toronto Marlies (AHL)	1-year	Free agency	
April 8, 2022	Max Ellis	Notre Dame Fighting Irish (B1G)	2-year	Free agency	
April 29, 2022	Bobby McMann	Toronto Marlies (AHL)	2-year	Free agency	

=== Players lost ===
Date	Player	New team	Term	Via	Ref
July 21, 2021	Jared McCann	Seattle Kraken		Expansion draft	
July 26, 2021	Veini Vehvilainen	Brynäs IF (SHL)	1-year	Free agency	
July 28, 2021	Frederik Andersen	Carolina Hurricanes	2-year	Free agency	
July 28, 2021	Zach Bogosian	Tampa Bay Lightning	3-year	Free agency	
July 28, 2021	Nick Foligno	Boston Bruins	2-year	Free agency	
July 28, 2021	Zach Hyman	Edmonton Oilers	7-year	Free agency	
July 28, 2021	Nic Petan	Vancouver Canucks	1-year	Free agency	
July 28, 2021	David Rittich	Nashville Predators	1-year	Free agency	
July 30, 2021	Calle Rosen	St. Louis Blues	1-year	Free agency	
July 31, 2021	Riley Nash	Winnipeg Jets	1-year	Free agency	
July 31, 2021	Stefan Noesen	Carolina Hurricanes	1-year	Free agency	
August 13, 2021	Joe Thornton	Florida Panthers	1-year	Free agency	
August 17, 2021	Scott Sabourin	Ottawa Senators	1-year	Free agency	
October 6, 2021	Alex Galchenyuk	Arizona Coyotes	1-year	Free agency	
October 11, 2021	Adam Brooks	Montreal Canadiens		Waivers	
October 28, 2021	Ben Hutton	Vegas Golden Knights	1-year	Free agency	
October 30, 2021	Michael Amadio	Vegas Golden Knights		Waivers	
December 1, 2021	Kirill Semyonov			Contract termination	
December 6, 2021	Kirill Semyonov	Avangard Omsk (KHL)	1-year	Free agency	
February 18, 2022	Adam Brooks	Winnipeg Jets		Waivers	
March 21, 2022	Harri Sateri	Arizona Coyotes		Waivers	
May 29, 2022	Jason Spezza			Retirement	
June 14, 2022	Carter Hutton			Retirement	

=== Signings ===
Date	Player	Term	Contract type	Ref
July 8, 2021	Travis Dermott	2-year	Re-signing	
July 17, 2021	Joseph Woll	1-year	Re-signing	
August 1, 2021	Brennan Menell	1-year	Re-signing	
August 5, 2021	Joseph Duszak	1-year	Re-signing	
September 25, 2021	William Villeneuve	3-year	Entry-level	
October 29, 2021	Morgan Rielly	8-year	Extension	
December 19, 2021	Ty Voit	3-year	Entry-level	
February 11, 2022	Joseph Woll	3-year	Extension	
February 17, 2022	Mac Hollowell	1-year	Entry-level	
February 18, 2022	Dmitri Ovchinnikov	3-year	Entry-level	
March 9, 2022	Kyle Clifford	2-year	Extension	
March 9, 2022	Carl Dahlstrom	1-year	Extension	
March 26, 2022	Nick Abruzzese	2-year	Entry-level	
March 30, 2022	Mikko Kokkonen	3-year	Entry-level	
April 8, 2022	Axel Rindell	2-year	Entry-level	
May 13, 2022	Roni Hirvonen	3-year	Entry-level	
May 13, 2022	Topi Niemela	3-year	Entry-level	
May 22, 2022	Mark Giordano	2-year	Extension	
June 27, 2022	Timothy Liljegren	2-year	Extension	

== Draft picks ==
Below are the Toronto Maple Leafs' selections at the 2021 NHL entry draft, which were held on July 23 to 24, 2021. It was held virtually via video conference call from the NHL Network studio in Secaucus, New Jersey.

Round	#	Player	Pos.	Nationality	Team (League)
2	57	Matthew Knies	LW	USA	Tri-City Storm (USHL)
5	153	Ty Voit	C	USA	Sarnia Sting (OHL)
6	185	Vyacheslav Peska	G	Russia	Irbis Kazan (MHL)
