= 2021–22 Florida Panthers season =

National Hockey League season

2021–22 Florida Panthers
- Presidents' Trophy winners
- Atlantic Division champions
- Division: 1st Atlantic
- Conference: 1st Eastern
- 2021–22 record: 58–18–6
- Home record: 34–7–0
- Road record: 24–11–6
- Goals for: 340
- Goals against: 246

Team information
- General manager: Bill Zito
- Coach: Joel Quenneville (Oct. 14 – Oct. 28); Andrew Brunette (interim, Oct. 29 – May 23)
- Captain: Aleksander Barkov
- Alternate captains: Aaron Ekblad; Patric Hornqvist; Jonathan Huberdeau
- Arena: FLA Live Arena
- Average attendance: 14,811
- Minor league affiliates: Charlotte Checkers (AHL); Greenville Swamp Rabbits (ECHL)

Team leaders
- Goals: Aleksander Barkov (39)
- Assists: Jonathan Huberdeau (85)
- Points: Jonathan Huberdeau (115)
- Penalty minutes: Radko Gudas (105)
- Plus/minus: Gustav Forsling (+41)
- Wins: Sergei Bobrovsky (39)
- Goals against average: Sergei Bobrovsky (2.67)

The 2021–22 Florida Panthers season was the 28th season for the National Hockey League (NHL) franchise that was established in 1993. Head coach Joel Quenneville returned to coach his third season with the team, but resigned from his coaching duties as a result of the fallout from the 2010 Chicago Blackhawks sexual assault scandal on October 28, 2021. On October 29, assistant coach Andrew Brunette was named interim head coach.

Throughout the season, the team was defined by its high-scoring offense. The Panthers scored 4.14 goals per game, which was the highest mark since the 1995–96 Pittsburgh Penguins, who scored 4.41 goals per game. The Panthers were scoring 1.07 goals per game above the league average, which counted as the 16th-highest mark in NHL history.

The Panthers began the season 3–0–0 for the second straight season, and later set a new team record for season-opening winning streak with an 8–0–0 record. They became the seventh team to begin the season at 8–0–0. The streak ended after the Panthers lost to the Boston Bruins 3–2 in a shootout on October 30. Florida became the first team to clinch a berth in the 2022 Stanley Cup playoffs following a 5–3 win over the Buffalo Sabres on April 3, 2022. On April 21, the Panthers clinched the Atlantic Division title, and on April 28, they won the Presidents' Trophy for the first time in franchise history.

On May 13, 2022, the Panthers won their first playoff series since the 1996 playoffs by defeating the Washington Capitals in six games, only to suffer an upset in the second round by the Tampa Bay Lightning, who swept them in four games. Until the 2025–26 season, this was the most recent year the Panthers did not advance to the Stanley Cup Final.

== Standings ==
=== Divisional standings ===
Atlantic Division
Pos	Team	GP	W	L	OTL	RW	GF	GA	GD	Pts
1	p – Florida Panthers	82	58	18	6	42	340	246	+94	122
2	x – Toronto Maple Leafs	82	54	21	7	45	315	253	+62	115
3	x – Tampa Bay Lightning	82	51	23	8	39	287	233	+54	110
4	x – Boston Bruins	82	51	26	5	40	255	220	+35	107
5	Buffalo Sabres	82	32	39	11	25	232	290	−58	75
6	Detroit Red Wings	82	32	40	10	21	230	312	−82	74
7	Ottawa Senators	82	33	42	7	26	227	266	−39	73
8	Montreal Canadiens	82	22	49	11	16	221	319	−98	55

Source: National Hockey League
Rules for classification: 1) Fewer number of games played (GP, only during regular season); 2) Greater number of regulation wins (RW); 3) Greater number of wins in regulation and overtime, excluding shootout wins (ROW); 4) Greater number of total wins, including shootouts (W); 5) Greater number of points earned in head-to-head play; if teams played an uneven number of head-to-head games, the result of the first game on the home ice of the team with the extra home game is discarded; 6) Greater goal differential (GD); 7) Greater number of goals scored (GF)
p – Clinched Presidents' Trophy; x – Clinched playoff spot

=== Conference standings ===
Eastern Conference Wild Card
Pos	Div	Team	GP	W	L	OTL	RW	GF	GA	GD	Pts
1	AT	x – Boston Bruins	82	51	26	5	40	255	220	+35	107
2	ME	x – Washington Capitals	82	44	26	12	35	275	245	+30	100
3	ME	New York Islanders	82	37	35	10	34	231	237	−6	84
4	ME	Columbus Blue Jackets	82	37	38	7	26	262	300	−38	81
5	AT	Buffalo Sabres	82	32	39	11	25	232	290	−58	75
6	AT	Detroit Red Wings	82	32	40	10	21	230	312	−82	74
7	AT	Ottawa Senators	82	33	42	7	26	227	266	−39	73
8	ME	New Jersey Devils	82	27	46	9	19	248	307	−59	63
9	ME	Philadelphia Flyers	82	25	46	11	20	211	298	−87	61
10	AT	Montreal Canadiens	82	22	49	11	16	221	319	−98	55

Source: National Hockey League
Rules for classification: 1) Fewer number of games played (GP, only during regular season); 2) Greater number of regulation wins (RW); 3) Greater number of wins in regulation and overtime, excluding shootout wins (ROW); 4) Greater number of total wins, including shootouts (W); 5) Greater number of points earned in head-to-head play; if teams played an uneven number of head-to-head games, the result of the first game on the home ice of the team with the extra home game is discarded; 6) Greater goal differential (GD); 7) Greater number of goals scored (GF)
x – Clinched playoff spot

== Schedule and results ==
=== Regular season ===
2021–22 game log

October: 8–0–1 (home: 5–0–0; road: 3–0–1)
#	Date	Visitor	Score	Home	OT	Decision	Attendance	Record	Pts	Recap
1	October 14	Pittsburgh	4–5	Florida	OT	Bobrovsky	14,308	1–0–0	2
2	October 16	NY Islanders	1–5	Florida		Bobrovsky	12,936	2–0–0	4
3	October 19	Florida	4–1	Tampa Bay		Knight	19,092	3–0–0	6
4	October 21	Colorado	1–4	Florida		Bobrovsky	11,245	4–0–0	8
5	October 23	Florida	4–2	Philadelphia		Bobrovsky	16,936	5–0–0	10
6	October 25	Arizona	3–5	Florida		Knight	13,943	6–0–0	12
7	October 27	Boston	1–4	Florida		Bobrovsky	12,306	7–0–0	14
8	October 29	Florida	3–2	Detroit	OT	Bobrovsky	15,593	8–0–0	16
9	October 30	Florida	2–3	Boston	SO	Knight	17,850	8–0–1	17

November: 7–4–2 (home: 7–1–0; road: 0–3–2)
#	Date	Visitor	Score	Home	OT	Decision	Attendance	Record	Pts	Recap
10	November 4	Washington	4–5	Florida	OT	Knight	12,542	9–0–1	19
11	November 6	Carolina	2–5	Florida		Knight	13,835	10–0–1	21
12	November 8	Florida	3–4	NY Rangers		Knight	14,877	10–1–1	21
13	November 9	Florida	3–7	New Jersey		Knight	10,627	10–2–1	21
14	November 11	Florida	2–3	Pittsburgh	SO	Bobrovsky	17,194	10–2–2	22
15	November 13	Florida	2–3	Tampa Bay	OT	Bobrovsky	19,092	10–2–3	23
16	November 16	NY Islanders	1–6	Florida		Bobrovsky	14,003	11–2–3	25
17	November 18	New Jersey	1–4	Florida		Knight	12,157	12–2–3	27
18	November 20	Minnesota	4–5	Florida		Bobrovsky	13,854	13–2–3	29
19	November 24	Philadelphia	1–2	Florida	OT	Bobrovsky	15,545	14–2–3	31
20	November 26	Florida	3–4	Washington		Bobrovsky	18,573	14–3–3	31
21	November 27	Seattle	4–1	Florida		Knight	15,305	14–4–3	31
22	November 30	Washington	4–5	Florida		Bobrovsky	12,365	15–4–3	33

December: 5–3–1 (home: 4–2–0; road: 1–1–1)
#	Date	Visitor	Score	Home	OT	Decision	Attendance	Record	Pts	Recap
23	December 2	Buffalo	4–7	Florida		Knight	11,751	16–4–3	35
24	December 4	St. Louis	3–4	Florida	SO	Bobrovsky	13,446	17–4–3	37
25	December 7	Florida	3–4	St. Louis	OT	Knight	16,372	17–4–4	38
26	December 10	Florida	3–1	Arizona		Bobrovsky	11,974	18–4–4	40
27	December 12	Florida	2–3	Colorado		Bobrovsky	16,548	18–5–4	40
28	December 14	Ottawa	8–2	Florida		Knight	13,759	18–6–4	40
29	December 16	Los Angeles	4–1	Florida		Bobrovsky	14,458	18–7–4	40
–	December 18	Florida	–	Minnesota	Postponed due to COVID-19. Moved to February 18.
–	December 21	Florida	–	Chicago	Postponed due to COVID-19. Moved to February 20
–	December 23	Nashville	–	Florida	Postponed due to COVID-19. Moved to February 22.
–	December 27	Florida	–	Carolina	Postponed due to COVID-19. Moved to February 16.
30	December 29	NY Rangers	3–4	Florida		Bobrovsky	15,857	19–7–4	42
31	December 30	Tampa Bay	3–9	Florida		Knight	15,001	20–7–4	44

January: 12–2–1 (home: 7–0–0; road: 5–2–1)
#	Date	Visitor	Score	Home	OT	Decision	Attendance	Record	Pts	Recap
32	January 1	Montreal	2–5	Florida		Bobrovsky	13,584	21–7–4	46
33	January 4	Calgary	2–6	Florida		Bobrovsky	13,164	22–7–4	48
34	January 6	Florida	5–6	Dallas	SO	Bobrovsky	17,678	22–7–5	49
35	January 8	Florida	4–3	Carolina	OT	Bobrovsky	18,680	23–7–5	51
36	January 11	Vancouver	2–5	Florida		Bobrovsky	15,041	24–7–5	53
37	January 14	Dallas	1–7	Florida		Bobrovsky	15,022	25–7–5	55
38	January 15	Columbus	2–9	Florida		Bobrovsky	15,088	26–7–5	57
39	January 18	Florida	1–5	Calgary		Knight	9,639	26–8–5	57
40	January 20	Florida	6–0	Edmonton		Bobrovsky	9,150	27–8–5	59
41	January 21	Florida	2–1	Vancouver	SO	Knight	9,346	28–8–5	61
42	January 23	Florida	3–5	Seattle		Bobrovsky	17,151	28–9–5	61
43	January 25	Florida	5–3	Winnipeg		Bobrovsky	250	29–9–5	63
44	January 27	Vegas	1–4	Florida		Knight	15,400	30–9–5	65
45	January 29	San Jose	4–5	Florida	OT	Bobrovsky	18,152	31–9–5	67
46	January 31	Florida	8–4	Columbus		Bobrovsky	14,214	32–9–5	69

February: 3–4–0 (home: 0–3–0; road: 3–1–0)
#	Date	Visitor	Score	Home	OT	Decision	Attendance	Record	Pts	Recap
47	February 1	Florida	2–5	NY Rangers		Knight	15,942	32–10–5	69
48	February 16	Florida	3–2	Carolina	OT	Bobrovsky	16,986	33–10–5	71
49	February 18	Florida	6–2	Minnesota		Bobrovsky	18,300	34–10–5	73
50	February 20	Florida	5–2	Chicago		Bobrovsky	19,619	35–10–5	75
51	February 22	Nashville	6–4	Florida		Bobrovsky	14,234	35–11–5	75
52	February 24	Columbus	6–3	Florida		Johansson	15,730	35–12–5	75
53	February 26	Edmonton	4–3	Florida		Bobrovsky	15,628	35–13–5	75

March: 11–2–1 (home: 5–0–0; road: 6–2–1)
#	Date	Visitor	Score	Home	OT	Decision	Attendance	Record	Pts	Recap
54	March 3	Ottawa	0–3	Florida		Bobrovsky	16,499	36–13–5	77
55	March 5	Detroit	2–6	Florida		Bobrovsky	15,890	37–13–5	79
56	March 7	Florida	6–1	Buffalo		Knight	7,906	38–13–5	81
57	March 8	Florida	4–3	Pittsburgh		Bobrovsky	17,876	39–13–5	83
58	March 10	Philadelphia	3–6	Florida		Bobrovsky	17,193	40–13–5	85
59	March 13	Florida	2–3	Los Angeles	SO	Knight	15,822	40–13–6	86
60	March 15	Florida	3–2	San Jose	OT	Knight	12,276	41–13–6	88
61	March 17	Florida	3–5	Vegas		Knight	18,265	41–14–6	88
62	March 18	Florida	3–0	Anaheim		Knight	12,296	42–14–6	90
63	March 24	Florida	4–3	Montreal		Knight	20,788	43–14–6	92
64	March 26	Florida	4–3	Ottawa	SO	Bobrovsky	17,201	44–14–6	94
65	March 27	Florida	2–5	Toronto		Knight	18,939	44–15–6	94
66	March 29	Montreal	4–7	Florida		Bobrovsky	15,587	45–15–6	96
67	March 31	Chicago	0–4	Florida		Bobrovsky	15,218	46–15–6	98

April: 12–3–0 (home: 5–1–0; road: 7–2-0)
#	Date	Visitor	Score	Home	OT	Decision	Attendance	Record	Pts	Recap
68	April 2	Florida	7–6	New Jersey	OT	Knight	12,284	47–15–6	100
69	April 3	Florida	5–3	Buffalo		Knight	11,787	48–15–6	102
70	April 5	Toronto	6–7	Florida	OT	Knight	15,260	49–15–6	104
71	April 8	Buffalo	3–4	Florida		Bobrovsky	17,728	50–15–6	106
72	April 9	Florida	4–1	Nashville		Knight	17,465	51–15–6	108
73	April 12	Anaheim	2–3	Florida	OT	Bobrovsky	16,204	52–15–6	110
74	April 15	Winnipeg	1–6	Florida		Bobrovsky	17,625	53–15–6	112
75	April 17	Florida	6–1	Detroit		Knight	14,566	54–15–6	114
76	April 19	Florida	3–2	NY Islanders	OT	Bobrovsky	17,255	55–15–6	116
77	April 21	Detroit	2–5	Florida		Bobrovsky	16,238	56–15–6	118
78	April 23	Toronto	2–3	Florida	OT	Bobrovsky	17,132	57–15–6	120
79	April 24	Tampa Bay	8–4	Florida		Knight	17,036	57–16–6	120
80	April 26	Florida	2–4	Boston		Bobrovsky	17,850	57–17–6	120
81	April 28	Florida	4–0	Ottawa		Knight	17,102	58–17–6	122
82	April 29	Florida	2–10	Montreal		Johansson	21,105	58–18–6	122

Legend: Win (2 points) Loss (0 points) Overtime/shootout loss (1 point)

=== Playoffs ===
2022 Stanley Cup Playoffs

Eastern Conference First Round vs. (WC2) Washington Capitals: Florida won 4–2
#	Date	Visitor	Score	Home	OT	Decision	Attendance	Series	Recap
1	May 3	Washington	4–2	Florida		Bobrovsky	19,678	0–1
2	May 5	Washington	1–5	Florida		Bobrovsky	19,636	1–1
3	May 7	Florida	1–6	Washington		Bobrovsky	18,573	1–2
4	May 9	Florida	3–2	Washington	OT	Bobrovsky	18,573	2–2
5	May 11	Washington	3–5	Florida		Bobrovsky	20,023	3–2
6	May 13	Florida	4–3	Washington	OT	Bobrovsky	18,573	4–2

Eastern Conference Second Round vs. (A3) Tampa Bay Lightning: Tampa Bay won 4–0
#	Date	Visitor	Score	Home	OT	Decision	Attendance	Series	Recap
1	May 17	Tampa Bay	4–1	Florida		Bobrovsky	19,656	0–1
2	May 19	Tampa Bay	2–1	Florida		Bobrovsky	19,716	0–2
3	May 22	Florida	1–5	Tampa Bay		Bobrovsky	19,092	0–3
4	May 23	Florida	0–2	Tampa Bay		Bobrovsky	19,092	0–4

Legend: Win Loss

== Player statistics ==
=== Skaters ===
Regular season
Player	GP	G	A	Pts	+/−	PIM
Jonathan Huberdeau	80	30	85	115	+35	54
Aleksander Barkov	67	39	49	88	+36	18
Sam Reinhart	78	33	49	82	+25	13
Anthony Duclair	74	31	27	58	+19	30
Aaron Ekblad	61	15	42	57	+38	26
Carter Verhaeghe	78	24	31	55	+24	48
Sam Bennett	71	28	21	49	+27	74
Mason Marchment	54	18	29	47	+29	53
Anton Lundell	65	18	26	44	+33	18
MacKenzie Weegar	80	8	36	44	+40	81
Brandon Montour	81	11	26	37	+15	48
Gustav Forsling	71	10	27	37	+41	18
Patric Hornqvist	65	11	17	28	−5	19
Eetu Luostarinen	78	9	17	26	+1	12
Claude Giroux^{†}	18	3	20	23	+7	6
Frank Vatrano^{‡}	49	10	9	19	−2	16
Ryan Lomberg	55	9	9	18	+4	92
Radko Gudas	77	3	13	16	+27	105
Maxim Mamin	40	7	7	14	+8	13
Owen Tippett^{‡}	42	6	8	14	+2	10
Joe Thornton	34	5	5	10	−10	10
Lucas Carlsson	40	3	6	9	+3	10
Noel Acciari	20	3	5	8	+2	11
Ben Chiarot^{†}	20	2	6	8	+4	6
Matt Kiersted	10	1	1	2	−8	2
Petteri Lindbohm	9	0	1	1	0	5
Robert Hagg^{†}	16	0	1	1	0	10
Markus Nutivaara	1	0	1	1	0	0
Aleksi Heponiemi	6	0	1	1	−6	2
Kevin Connauton^{‡}	13	0	0	0	+4	2
Zac Dalpe	1	0	0	0	−1	0
Grigori Denisenko	1	0	0	0	0	2
Olli Juolevi^{‡}	10	0	0	0	0	2
Chase Priskie	4	0	0	0	+2	2
Cole Schwindt	3	0	0	0	−4	0

Playoffs
Player	GP	G	A	Pts	+/−	PIM
Carter Verhaeghe	10	6	6	12	+7	4
Claude Giroux	10	3	5	8	+2	0
Aleksander Barkov	10	2	5	7	+3	4
Aaron Ekblad	10	1	4	5	−2	11
Jonathan Huberdeau	10	1	4	5	+1	4
Sam Reinhart	10	3	1	4	−4	2
Sam Bennett	10	1	2	3	+1	12
Anthony Duclair	8	1	2	3	+4	4
Gustav Forsling	10	0	3	3	+7	4
Brandon Montour	10	0	3	3	0	6
Eetu Luostarinen	10	1	1	2	−3	2
Patric Hornqvist	10	1	1	2	−3	4
Radko Gudas	10	0	2	2	+1	6
Anton Lundell	9	1	0	1	−1	2
Ryan Lomberg	5	1	0	1	−1	2
Mason Marchment	4	1	0	1	−3	6
MacKenzie Weegar	10	0	1	1	+1	10
Ben Chiarot	10	0	1	1	−1	8
Maxim Mamin	4	0	0	0	−3	0
Noel Acciari	9	0	0	0	−5	0
Joe Thornton	1	0	0	0	−1	0

=== Goaltenders ===
Regular season
Player	GP	GS	TOI	W	L	OT	GA	GAA	SA	SV%	SO	G	A	PIM
Sergei Bobrovsky	54	53	3,082:10	39	7	3	137	2.67	1,566	.913	3	0	0	4
Spencer Knight	32	27	1,740:14	19	9	3	81	2.79	876	.908	2	0	0	0
Jonas Johansson	2	2	116:13	0	2	0	15	7.74	64	.766	0	0	0	0

Playoffs
Player	GP	GS	TOI	W	L	GA	GAA	SA	SV%	SO	G	A	PIM
Sergei Bobrovsky	10	10	600:18	4	6	27	2.70	303	.911	0	0	0	2

^{†}Denotes player spent time with another team before joining the Panthers. Stats reflect time with the Panthers only.
^{‡}Denotes player was traded mid-season. Stats reflect time with the Panthers only.
Bold/italics denotes franchise record.

== Transactions ==
The Panthers have been involved in the following transactions during the 2021–22 season.

=== Trades ===
Date	Details		Ref
July 24, 2021	To Buffalo Sabres Devon Levi; Conditional^{1} 1st-round pick in 2022 or 2023	To Florida Panthers Sam Reinhart	
July 26, 2021	To Arizona Coyotes Anton Stralman; Vladislav Kolyachonok; 2nd-round pick in 2024	To Florida Panthers 7th-round pick in 2023	
October 10, 2021	To Vancouver Canucks Noah Juulsen; Juho Lammikko	To Florida Panthers Olli Juolevi	
March 16, 2022	To New York Rangers Frank Vatrano	To Florida Panthers Conditional^{2} NYR or WPG 4th-round pick in 2022	
March 16, 2022	To Montreal Canadiens Ty Smilanic; Conditional^{3} 1st-round pick in 2023; Conditional^{2} NYR or WPG 4th-round pick in 2022	To Florida Panthers Ben Chiarot	
March 19, 2022	To Philadelphia Flyers Owen Tippett; Conditional^{4} 1st-round pick in 2024; 3rd-round pick in 2023	To Florida Panthers Claude Giroux; Connor Bunnaman; German Rubtsov; 5th-round pick in 2024	
March 20, 2022	To Buffalo Sabres CGY 6th-round pick in 2022	To Florida Panthers Robert Hagg	
March 21, 2022	To Carolina Hurricanes Max Domi; Tyler Inamoto	To Florida Panthers Yegor Korshkov; CBJ 6th-round pick in 2022	
March 21, 2022	To Columbus Blue Jackets Aidan Hreschuk	To Florida Panthers Yegor Korshkov; CBJ 6th-round pick in 2022	

Notes:

1. Buffalo will receive a first-round pick in 2022 if the selection is outside of the top 10; otherwise Buffalo will receive a first-round pick in 2023.
2. Florida will receive the later of either New York's or Winnipeg's 4th-round pick.
3. Montreal will receive Florida's 1st-round pick in 2024 if Florida retains their 2022 1st-round pick.
4. Philadelphia will receive Florida's 1st-round pick in 2024 if it falls outside the top 10 selections, otherwise Philadelphia will receive Florida's 1st-round pick in 2025.

=== Players acquired ===
Date	Player	Former team	Term	Via	Ref
July 28, 2021	Christopher Gibson	Tampa Bay Lightning	1-year	Free agency	
July 30, 2021	Zac Dalpe	Columbus Blue Jackets	2-year	Free agency	
August 13, 2021	Joe Thornton	Toronto Maple Leafs	1-year	Free agency	
December 13, 2021	Jonas Johansson	Colorado Avalanche		Waivers	
January 14, 2022	Evan Fitzpatrick	Charlotte Checkers (AHL)	1-year	Free agency	
February 7, 2022	Mack Guzda	Barrie Colts (OHL)	3-year	Free agency	
February 28, 2022	Petteri Lindbohm	Jokerit (KHL)	1-year	Free agency	
June 10, 2022	Calle Sjalin	Leksands IF (SHL)	2-year	Free agency	
June 14, 2022	Anton Levtchi	Tappara (Liiga)	1-year	Free agency	

=== Players lost ===
Date	Player	New team	Term	Via	Ref
July 15, 2021	Keith Yandle			Buy-out	
July 21, 2021	Chris Driedger	Seattle Kraken		Expansion draft	
July 28, 2021	Brady Keeper	Vancouver Canucks	2-year	Free agency	
July 28, 2021	Ethan Prow	Buffalo Sabres	1-year	Free agency	
July 28, 2021	Alexander Wennberg	Seattle Kraken	3-year	Free agency	
July 30, 2021	Tommy Cross	St. Louis Blues	1-year	Free agency	
August 13, 2021	Ryan Bednard	Hershey Bears (AHL)	1-year	Free agency	
August 17, 2021	Philippe Desrosiers	Manitoba Moose (AHL)	1-year	Free agency	
August 19, 2021	Jake Massie	South Carolina Stingrays (ECHL)	1-year	Free agency	
September 1, 2021	Alec Rauhauser	Greenville Swamp Rabbits (ECHL)	1-year	Free agency	
September 8, 2021	Patrick Bajkov	Reading Royals (ECHL)	1-year	Free agency	
September 8, 2021	Brad Morrison	HC Pustertal Wolfe (ICEHL)	1-year	Free agency	
October 2, 2021	Samuel Montembeault	Montreal Canadiens		Waivers	
October 4, 2021	Scott Wilson	Charlotte Checkers (AHL)	1-year	Free agency	
October 12, 2021	Nikita Gusev	SKA St. Petersburg (KHL)	1-year	Free agency	
December 7, 2021	Kevin Connauton	Philadelphia Flyers		Waivers	
March 6, 2022	Olli Juolevi	Detroit Red Wings		Waivers	
June 9, 2022	Evan Fitzpatrick	Charlotte Checkers (AHL)	1-year	Free agency	

=== Signings ===
Date	Player	Term	Contract type	Ref
July 15, 2021	Anthony Duclair	3-year	Re-signing	
July 15, 2021	Gustav Forsling	3-year	Re-signing	
July 26, 2021	Sam Bennett	4-year	Re-signing	
July 26, 2021	Lucas Carlsson	1-year	Re-signing	
July 26, 2021	Noah Juulsen	1-year	Re-signing	
July 28, 2021	Juho Lammikko	1-year	Re-signing	
July 28, 2021	Carter Verhaeghe	3-year	Extension	
July 28, 2021	Maxim Mamin	1-year	Re-signing	
July 28, 2021	Brandon Montour	3-year	Re-signing	
August 1, 2021	Sam Montembeault	1-year	Re-signing	
August 5, 2021	Chase Priskie	1-year	Re-signing	
August 11, 2021	Sam Reinhart	3-year	Re-signing	
September 25, 2021	Justin Sourdif	3-year	Entry-level	
October 9, 2021	Aleksander Barkov	8-year	Extension	
November 26, 2021	Ryan Lomberg	2-year	Extension	
March 16, 2021	Zach Uens	3-year	Entry-level	
May 2, 2022	Santtu Kinnunen	2-year	Entry-level	
June 27, 2022	Matt Kiersted	2-year	Extension	
July 5, 2022	Aleksi Heponiemi	1-year	Extension	

== Draft picks ==
Below are the Florida Panthers' selections at the 2021 NHL entry draft, which were held on July 23 to 24, 2021. It was held virtually via Video conference call from the NHL Network studio in Secaucus, New Jersey.

Round	#	Player	Pos	Nationality	College/Junior/Club team (League)
1	24	Mackie Samoskevich	RW	USA	Chicago Steel (USHL)
2	56	Evan Nause	D	Canada	Quebec Remparts (QMJHL)
4	120	Vladislav Lukashevich	D	Russia	Loko Yaroslavl (MHL)
5	152	Kirill Gerasimyuk	G	Russia	SKA Varyagi (MHL)
6	184	Jakub Kos	LW	Czech Republic	Ilves U20 (U20 SM-sarja)
7	210	Braden Hache	D	USA	Kingston Frontenacs (OHL)
