= Aleksandr Kisakov =

Russian ice hockey player (born 2002)

- Born: November 1, 2002 (age 23) Solikamsk, Russia
- Height: 5 ft 10 in (178 cm)
- Weight: 150 lb (68 kg; 10 st 10 lb)
- Position: Forward
- Shoots: Left
- KHL team Former teams: Sibir Novosibirsk; Dynamo Moscow; Rochester Americans; Dinamo Saint Petersburg; Traktor Chelyabinsk; Chelmet Chelyabinsk
- NHL draft: 53rd overall, 2021; Buffalo Sabres
- Playing career: 2021–present

Aleksandr Kisakov (born 1 November 2002) is a Russian ice hockey forward who is currently playing with Sibir Novosibirsk of the Kontinental Hockey League (KHL).

== Playing career ==
Kisakov as a youth developed with MHC Dynamo Moscow of the MHL before he was drafted by the Buffalo Sabres of the National Hockey League in the second-round of the 2021 NHL entry draft with the 53rd overall pick of the draft.

He made his KHL debut for Dynamo Moscow during the 2021–22 season before signing his three-year, entry-level contract with the Buffalo Sabres on 11 May 2022.

Kisakov played the entirety of his tenure within the Sabres organization with American Hockey League (AHL) affiliate, the Rochester Americans. Unable to find his footing through three seasons with the Americans, Kisakov left the club as a free agent after not being tendered a qualifying offer following the 2024–25 season.

On 25 July 2025, Kisakov returned to his original club, Dynamo Moscow of the KHL, on an initial try-out basis for the 2025–26 season.

== Career statistics ==
			Regular season					Playoffs
Season	Team	League	GP	G	A	Pts	PIM	GP	G	A	Pts	PIM
2018–19	MHC Dynamo Moscow	MHL	5	0	2	2	2	—	—	—	—	—
2019–20	MHC Dynamo Moscow	MHL	34	2	16	18	24	—	—	—	—	—
2020–21	MHC Dynamo Moscow	MHL	61	36	37	73	90	14	5	5	10	0
2021–22	MHC Dynamo Moscow	MHL	51	26	30	56	40	6	0	7	7	4
2021–22	Dynamo Moscow	KHL	4	0	0	0	0	—	—	—	—	—
2022–23	Rochester Americans	AHL	48	6	2	8	24	—	—	—	—	—
2023–24	Rochester Americans	AHL	32	5	8	13	12	—	—	—	—	—
2024–25	Rochester Americans	AHL	13	3	1	4	8	—	—	—	—	—
2025–26	Dynamo Moscow	KHL	17	1	0	1	2	—	—	—	—	—
2025–26	Dynamo St. Petersburg	VHL	6	2	0	2	6	—	—	—	—	—
2025–26	Traktor Chelyabinsk	KHL	8	0	3	3	2	—	—	—	—	—
2025–26	Chelmet Chelyabinsk	VHL	4	1	2	3	0	6	2	3	5	0
KHL totals			29	1	3	4	4	—	—	—	—	—
