= MHC Dynamo Moscow =

MHC Dynamo Moscow МХК Динамо Москва
- City: Moscow, Russia
- League: MHL
- Conference: Western Conference
- Founded: 2009
- Home arena: Balashikha Arena
- Colours
- General manager: Sergey Cherkas
- Head coach: Anatoliy Antipov
- Affiliates: Dynamo Moscow (KHL); Buran (VHL)
- Website: mhk.dynamo.ru

Franchise history
- 2009-2011: Sheriff
- 2011-2017: MHC MVD
- 2017-present: MHC Dynamo Moscow

MHC Dynamo Moscow (Russian: МХК Динамо Москва) is a Russian junior ice hockey team based in Moscow that currently plays in the Junior Hockey League. The team was founded in 2009 as "Sheriff" and adopted the name "MHC MVD" in 2011 before changing it to their current name in 2017. They are the junior affiliate of HC Dynamo Moscow of the Kontinental Hockey League (KHL) and play their home games in Balashikha Arena.
