= Brennan Menell =

American ice hockey player (born 1997)

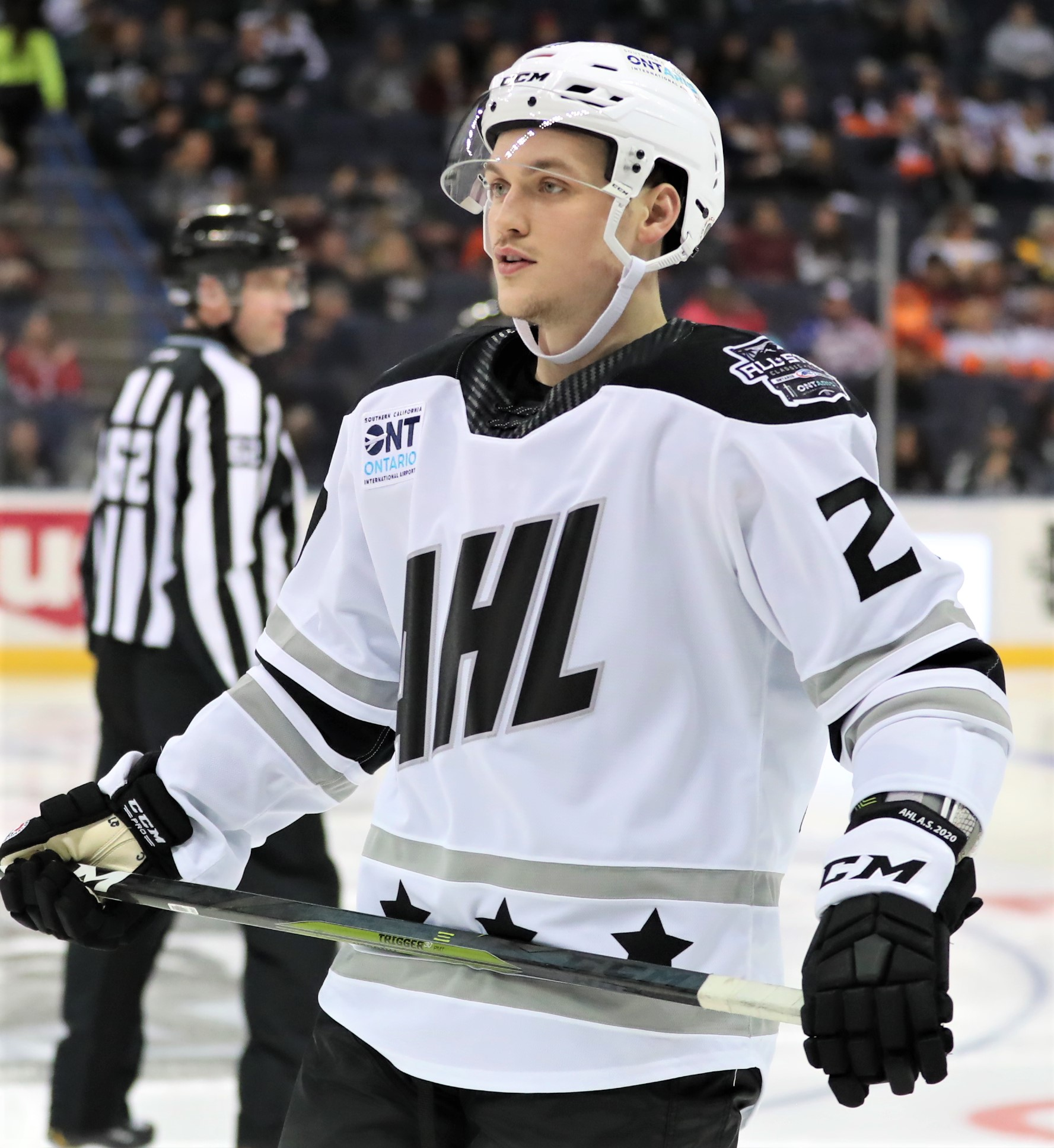
- Menell at the 2020 AHL All-Star Game
- Born: May 24, 1997 (age 29) Woodbury, Minnesota, U.S.
- Height: 5 ft 11 in (180 cm)
- Weight: 183 lb (83 kg; 13 st 1 lb)
- Position: Defence
- Shoots: Right
- KHL team Former teams: Shanghai Dragons; Minnesota Wild; Dinamo Minsk; Dynamo Moscow; SKA Saint Petersburg
- NHL draft: Undrafted
- Playing career: 2017–present

Brennan Menell (born May 24, 1997) is an American-Russian professional ice hockey defenseman currently playing under contract with the Shanghai Dragons of the Kontinental Hockey League (KHL). In July 2023, he received Russian citizenship.

== Playing career ==
Undrafted, Menell played for the Vancouver Giants and Lethbridge Hurricanes in the Western Hockey League before signing as a free agent with the Minnesota Wild on a three-year, entry-level contract after impressing on an invitation to attend training camp on September 26, 2017, having been undrafted in the NHL entry draft.

In his final year of his entry-level contract with the Wild, Menell was reassigned to AHL affiliate, the Iowa Wild, for the third consecutive year. In the 2019–20 season, Menell established a career high with 47 points in 57 games for Iowa, finishing second among AHL defensemen in scoring and first in assists with 42. As Iowa's franchise record-holder in nearly all offensive categories for blueliners, with 101 assists and 116 points in 199 games over his AHL career, Menell was selected to the AHL First All-Star Team. During the season, he was recalled by the Wild and made his NHL debut against the Anaheim Ducks on December 10, 2019. He featured in 5 games with the Wild, going scoreless.

As an impending restricted free agent with the Minnesota Wild and with the uncertainty of a delayed commencement of the 2020–21 North American season, Menell opted to sign abroad by signing a one-year contract with Belarusian club, HC Dinamo Minsk of the Kontinental Hockey League (KHL), on August 29, 2020.

On July 28, 2021, his signing rights were acquired by the Toronto Maple Leafs from the Minnesota Wild for a 7th round draft pick in the 2022 NHL entry draft. He was then signed a one-year, two-way, $750,000 contract with Toronto on August 1, 2021. On March 23, 2022, a day after the trade deadline, he was traded to the Philadelphia Flyers in exchange for future considerations. He completed the season playing with the Flyers AHL affiliate, the Lehigh Valley Phantoms, collecting 6 assists through 18 games.

As a free agent from the Flyers, Menell opted to return to the KHL after securing a one-year contract with Russian club, HC Dynamo Moscow, for the 2022–23 season on September 19, 2022.

Following three seasons with Dynamo, Menell was traded to SKA Saint Petersburg in exchange for Timur Kol and Stanislav Berezhnoy on July 8, 2025.

== Career statistics ==
			Regular season					Playoffs
Season	Team	League	GP	G	A	Pts	PIM	GP	G	A	Pts	PIM
2014–15	Vancouver Giants	WHL	57	2	19	21	16	—	—	—	—	—
2015–16	Vancouver Giants	WHL	69	7	46	53	36	—	—	—	—	—
2016–17	Lethbridge Hurricanes	WHL	70	12	59	71	29	20	5	12	17	10
2017–18	Iowa Wild	AHL	72	8	17	25	14	—	—	—	—	—
2018–19	Iowa Wild	AHL	70	2	42	44	25	11	0	4	4	4
2019–20	Iowa Wild	AHL	57	5	42	47	36	—	—	—	—	—
2019–20	Minnesota Wild	NHL	5	0	0	0	2	—	—	—	—	—
2020–21	Dinamo Minsk	KHL	47	5	33	38	60	5	1	6	7	0
2021–22	Toronto Marlies	AHL	20	1	4	5	15	—	—	—	—	—
2021–22	Lehigh Valley Phantoms	AHL	18	0	6	6	19	—	—	—	—	—
2022–23	Dynamo Moscow	KHL	44	2	22	24	6	6	0	3	3	2
2023–24	Dynamo Moscow	KHL	66	8	37	45	12	10	0	12	12	2
2024–25	Dynamo Moscow	KHL	45	4	18	22	8	7	0	2	2	0
2025–26	SKA Saint Petersburg	KHL	56	8	9	17	14	4	1	0	1	0
NHL totals			5	0	0	0	2	—	—	—	—	—
KHL totals			258	27	119	146	100	32	2	23	25	4

== Awards and honors ==
Award	Year
AHL
All-Star Game	2020
First All-Star Team	2020
