= Tyler Inamoto =

American ice hockey player (born 1999)

- Born: May 6, 1999 (age 27) Flemington, New Jersey, U.S.
- Height: 6 ft 2 in (188 cm)
- Weight: 194 lb (88 kg; 13 st 12 lb)
- Position: Defense
- Shoots: Left
- AHL team (P) Cur. team Former teams: Calgary Wranglers; Rapid City Rush (ECHL); Ontario Reign; Bakersfield Condors
- NHL draft: 133rd overall, 2017; Florida Panthers
- Playing career: 2022–present

Tyler Inamoto (born May 6, 1999) is an American professional ice hockey player for the Rapid City Rush of the ECHL while under contract Calgary Wranglers of the American Hockey League (AHL). He was selected 133rd overall by the Florida Panthers in the 2017 NHL Entry Draft.

Born in Flemington, New Jersey, of Japanese ancestry, Inamoto moved with his family to Barrington, Illinois, in his early teens and played prep hockey at Shattuck-Saint Mary's School and then Pioneer High School.

== Playing career ==
The Florida Panthers selected Inamoto in the fifth round, 133rd overall, of the 2017 NHL Entry Draft.

After completing his collegiate career, Inamoto signed with the Charlotte Checkers, then the American Hockey League affiliate of the Florida Panthers, and also appeared with the Florida Everblades of the ECHL. Inamoto was traded to the Columbus Blue Jackets for Max Domi and a 6th round pick in the 2022 NHL Draft on March 21, 2022. That same day he was traded again to the Carolina Hurricanes for Aidan Hreschuk.

== Career statistics ==
			Regular season					Playoffs
Season	Team	League	GP	G	A	Pts	PIM	GP	G	A	Pts	PIM
2017–18	Wisconsin Badgers	NCAA	37	1	3	4	47	—	—	—	—	—
2018–19	Wisconsin Badgers	NCAA	34	1	6	7	71	—	—	—	—	—
2019–20	Wisconsin Badgers	NCAA	35	2	5	7	16	—	—	—	—	—
2020–21	Wisconsin Badgers	NCAA	26	1	8	9	15	—	—	—	—	—
2021–22	Wisconsin Badgers	NCAA	26	0	2	2	26	—	—	—	—	—
2021–22	Ontario Reign	AHL	2	0	0	0	0	—	—	—	—	—
2022–23	Ontario Reign	AHL	7	0	1	1	4	—	—	—	—	—
2022–23	Greenville Swamp Rabbits	ECHL	36	3	5	8	30	—	—	—	—	—
2023–24	Ontario Reign	AHL	6	0	2	2	4	—	—	—	—	—
2023-24	Greenville Swamp Rabbits	ECHL	10	2	3	5	13	—	—	—	—	—
2024–25	Bakersfield Condors	AHL	8	0	2	2	4	—	—	—	—	—
2024-25	Fort Wayne Komets	ECHL	32	0	3	3	14	—	—	—	—	—
2025–26	Bakersfield Condors	AHL	9	0	2	2	6	—	—	—	—	—
2025–26	Fort Wayne Komets	AHL	41	1	10	11	47	—	—	—	—	—
AHL totals			32	0	7	7	18	—	—	—	—	—
