= 2022 Stanley Cup playoffs =

2022 playoff tournament of the National Hockey League

Tournament details
- Dates: May 2 – June 26, 2022
- Teams: 16
- Defending champions: Tampa Bay Lightning

Final positions
- Champions: Colorado Avalanche
- Runners-up: Tampa Bay Lightning

Tournament statistics
- Scoring leader(s): Connor McDavid (Oilers) (33 points)

Awards
- MVP: Cale Makar (Avalanche)

The 2022 Stanley Cup playoffs was the playoff tournament of the National Hockey League (NHL) for the 2021–22 season. The playoffs began on May 2, 2022, one day after the regular season ended, and concluded on June 26, 2022, with the Colorado Avalanche winning their third Stanley Cup in franchise history, defeating the Tampa Bay Lightning four games to two in the Stanley Cup Final.

With the Government of Canada allowing cross-border travel for fully vaccinated players and team personnel between Canada and the United States, the league was able to return to its usual two conference, four division alignment. As a result, the standard 16-team playoff format from 2014–2019 that was used before the COVID-19 pandemic was reinstated.

The Florida Panthers made the playoffs as the Presidents' Trophy winners with the most points (i.e. best record) during the regular season. This was the final season of the Pittsburgh Penguins' 16-season playoff streak, the longest active streak in the four major North American professional sports leagues at the time. Three of the semifinalists from the previous season (the Montreal Canadiens, New York Islanders and Vegas Golden Knights) failed to qualify for the playoffs. The Los Angeles Kings ended a two-year run in which no teams from California qualified for the playoffs. All eight playoff teams from the Eastern Conference finished the season with at least 100 points, marking the first playoffs in NHL history in which all eight teams in a single conference qualified with at least 100 points.

Florida's opening round series victory over the Washington Capitals was their first series win since the 1996 Eastern Conference finals. This postseason marked the third time that the league played 50 or more games in the opening round of the playoffs since this round was changed to a best-of-seven format in 1987. The first round featured five game sevens, the most in a single playoff round since 1992, when there were six game sevens in the division semifinals. On May 15, for the first time since 1997, and the second time in League history, both game sevens went into overtime. With their conference final series victory, the Tampa Bay Lightning became the third team in league history to win at least eleven consecutive playoff series; joining the Montreal Canadiens (1976–1980) and New York Islanders (1980–1984) in accomplishing this feat.

== Playoff seeds ==
This was the seventh year and first since 2019, in which the top three teams in each division made the playoffs, along with two wild cards in each conference (for a total of eight playoff teams from each conference).

The following teams qualified for the playoffs:

=== Eastern Conference ===
==== Atlantic Division ====
1. Florida Panthers, Atlantic Division champions, Eastern Conference regular season champions, Presidents' Trophy winners – 122 points
2. Toronto Maple Leafs – 115 points
3. Tampa Bay Lightning – 110 points (39 RWs)

==== Metropolitan Division ====
1. Carolina Hurricanes, Metropolitan Division champions – 116 points
2. New York Rangers – 110 points (44 RWs)
3. Pittsburgh Penguins – 103 points

==== Wild cards ====
1. Boston Bruins – 107 points
2. Washington Capitals – 100 points

=== Western Conference ===
==== Central Division ====
1. Colorado Avalanche, Central Division champions, Western Conference regular season champions – 119 points
2. Minnesota Wild – 113 points
3. St. Louis Blues – 109 points

==== Pacific Division ====
1. Calgary Flames, Pacific Division champions – 111 points
2. Edmonton Oilers – 104 points
3. Los Angeles Kings – 99 points

==== Wild cards ====
1. Dallas Stars – 98 points
2. Nashville Predators – 97 points

== Playoff bracket ==
In each round, teams compete in a best-of-seven series following a 2–2–1–1–1 format (scores in the bracket indicate the number of games won in each best-of-seven series). The team with home ice advantage plays at home for games one and two (and games five and seven, if necessary), and the other team is at home for games three and four (and game six, if necessary). The top three teams in each division make the playoffs, along with two wild cards in each conference, for a total of eight teams from each conference.

In the first round, the lower seeded wild card in each conference played against the division winner with the best record while the other wild card played against the other division winner, and both wild cards were de facto #4 seeds. The other series matched the second and third place teams from the divisions. In the first two rounds, home ice advantage was awarded to the team with the better seed. In the conference finals and Stanley Cup Final, home ice advantage was awarded to the team with the better regular season record.

First round	Second round
A1	Florida	4
WC2	Washington	2
A1	Florida	0
A3	Tampa Bay	4
A2	Toronto	3
A3	Tampa Bay	4
Eastern Conference
M1	Carolina	4
WC1	Boston	3
M1	Carolina	3
M2	NY Rangers	4
M2	NY Rangers	4
M3	Pittsburgh	3
C1	Colorado	4
WC2	Nashville	0
C1	Colorado	4
C3	St. Louis	2
C2	Minnesota	2
C3	St. Louis	4
Western Conference
P1	Calgary	4
WC1	Dallas	3
P1	Calgary	1
P2	Edmonton	4
P2	Edmonton	4
P3	Los Angeles	3

Conference finals
A3	Tampa Bay	4
M2	NY Rangers	2
C1	Colorado	4
P2	Edmonton	0

Stanley Cup Final
A3	Tampa Bay	2
C1	Colorado	4

Legend

- A1, A2, A3 – The first, second, and third place teams from the Atlantic Division, respectively
- M1, M2, M3 – The first, second, and third place teams from the Metropolitan Division, respectively
- C1, C2, C3 – The first, second, and third place teams from the Central Division, respectively
- P1, P2, P3 – The first, second, and third place teams from the Pacific Division, respectively
- WC1, WC2 – The first and second place teams in the Wild Card, respectively

== First round ==
=== Eastern Conference first round ===
==== (A1) Florida Panthers vs. (WC2) Washington Capitals ====
The Florida Panthers earned the Presidents' Trophy as the NHL's best regular season team with 122 points. Washington finished as the Eastern Conference's second wild card, earning 100 points. This was the first playoff meeting between these two teams. Florida won two of the three games in this year's regular season series.

The Panthers defeated the Capitals in six games and won their first playoff series since 1996. In game one, the Capitals overcame a one-goal deficit in the third period and gained the lead at 10:37 on T. J. Oshie's goal to win 4–2. Aleksander Barkov and Carter Verhaeghe both scored a goal and provided an assist in the Panthers' 5–1 victory in game two. Ilya Samsonov made 29 saves for the Capitals in game three, outscoring the Panthers 6–1 and taking a 2–1 series lead. Verhaeghe scored twice in game four, including the overtime-winning goal for the Panthers, tying the series up 2–2 in a 3–2 triumph. In game five, Verhaeghe scored twice and assisted on the other three Panthers’ goals in Florida's three-goal comeback, taking the game 5–3 to lead the series 3–2. In game six, Claude Giroux scored a goal and provided two assists and Verhaeghe scored the overtime goal in a 4–3 victory sending the Panthers to the second round for the first time in 26 years.

May 3	Washington Capitals	4–2	Florida Panthers	FLA Live Arena	Recap
Tom Wilson (1) – pp – 03:47		First period	17:55 – Sam Bennett (1)
No scoring		Second period	00:43 – Claude Giroux (1)
Evgeny Kuznetsov (1) – 08:14; T. J. Oshie (1) – 10:37; Lars Eller (1) – en – 19:11		Third period	No scoring
Vitek Vanecek 30 saves / 32 shots		Goalie stats	Sergei Bobrovsky 34 saves / 37 shots

May 5	Washington Capitals	1–5	Florida Panthers	FLA Live Arena	Recap
No scoring		First period	16:20 – Aaron Ekblad (1); 17:58 – Aleksander Barkov (1)
Nicklas Backstrom (1) – pp – 02:44		Second period	03:11 – Mason Marchment (1); 15:24 – Anton Lundell (1); 17:32 – Carter Verhaeghe (1)
No scoring		Third period	No scoring
Vitek Vanecek 14 saves / 19 shots Ilya Samsonov 17 saves / 17 shots		Goalie stats	Sergei Bobrovsky 26 saves / 27 shots

May 7	Florida Panthers	1–6	Washington Capitals	Capital One Arena	Recap
Jonathan Huberdeau (1) – 02:45		First period	19:34 – pp – T. J. Oshie (2)
No scoring		Second period	09:51 – Marcus Johansson (1); 18:49 – Trevor van Riemsdyk (1)
No scoring		Third period	10:25 – pp – Alexander Ovechkin (1); 15:40 – en – John Carlson (1); 19:18 – Garnet Hathaway (1)
Sergei Bobrovsky 25 saves / 30 shots		Goalie stats	Ilya Samsonov 29 saves / 30 shots

May 9	Florida Panthers	3–2	OT	Washington Capitals	Capital One Arena	Recap
Carter Verhaeghe (2) – 14:08		First period		07:15 – pp – T. J. Oshie (3)
No scoring		Second period		No scoring
Sam Reinhart (1) – 17:56		Third period		09:31 – Evgeny Kuznetsov (2)
Carter Verhaeghe (3) – 04:57		First overtime period		No scoring
Sergei Bobrovsky 14 saves / 16 shots		Goalie stats		Ilya Samsonov 29 saves / 32 shots

May 11	Washington Capitals	3–5	Florida Panthers	FLA Live Arena	Recap
T. J. Oshie (4) – pp – 07:09		First period	No scoring
Justin Schultz (1) – 02:13; T. J. Oshie (5) – 03:38		Second period	06:50 – Carter Verhaeghe (4); 12:27 – Patric Hornqvist (1); 14:44 – Sam Reinhart (2)
No scoring		Third period	03:04 – Carter Verhaeghe (5); 15:55 – Claude Giroux (2)
Ilya Samsonov 33 saves / 38 shots		Goalie stats	Sergei Bobrovsky 30 saves / 33 shots

May 13	Florida Panthers	4–3	OT	Washington Capitals	Capital One Arena	Recap
No scoring		First period		No scoring
Ryan Lomberg (1) – 06:13		Second period		03:44 – Nic Dowd (1)
Claude Giroux (3) – 08:18; Aleksander Barkov (2) – 14:17		Third period		01:37 – Nicklas Backstrom (2); 18:57 – pp – T. J. Oshie (6)
Carter Verhaeghe (6) – 02:46		First overtime period		No scoring
Sergei Bobrovsky 34 saves / 37 shots		Goalie stats		Ilya Samsonov 27 saves / 31 shots

Florida won series 4–2

==== (A2) Toronto Maple Leafs vs. (A3) Tampa Bay Lightning ====
The Toronto Maple Leafs finished second in the Atlantic Division, earning 115 points. The Tampa Bay Lightning earned 110 points to finish third in the Atlantic Division. This was the first playoff meeting between these two teams. These teams split their four-game regular season series.

The Lightning defeated the Maple Leafs in seven games. In game one, Maple Leaf's forward Auston Matthews provided two goals and an assist in Jack Campbell's 24-save 5–0 shutout. Victor Hedman had a goal and three assists for the Lightning in game two, giving Tampa Bay a 5–3 victory. In game three, Pierre Engvall provided three assists for the Maple Leafs, staving off a potential comeback from Tampa Bay and winning 5–2. In game four, the Lightning got off to a quick start, scoring three goals within the first eight minutes of the game en route to a 7–3 victory. The Maple Leafs came back from a 2–0 deficit in Game 5 with William Nylander providing a goal and two assists in a 4–3 victory. In game 6, although the Maple Leafs came back from a two-goal deficit, the Lightning's Brayden Point scored in overtime to extend the series to a seventh game in a 4–3 affair. In game 7, Nick Paul scored twice while the Lightning defended their 2–1 lead onto the victory and a second round advancement. With their game seven loss, the Maple Leafs lost eight consecutive playoff series and ten potential series-clinching games. After Florida won a playoff series for the first time since 1996, Toronto held the NHL's longest active playoff series win drought, as they last won a playoff series in 2004.

May 2	Tampa Bay Lightning	0–5	Toronto Maple Leafs	Scotiabank Arena	Recap
No scoring		First period	18:19 – Jake Muzzin (1)
No scoring		Second period	06:18 – pp – Auston Matthews (1); 09:27 – sh – David Kampf (1); 16:39 – Mitch Marner (1)
No scoring		Third period	08:16 – Auston Matthews (2)
Andrei Vasilevskiy 27 saves / 32 shots		Goalie stats	Jack Campbell 24 saves / 24 shots

May 4	Tampa Bay Lightning	5–3	Toronto Maple Leafs	Scotiabank Arena	Recap
Victor Hedman (1) – pp – 19:57		First period	No scoring
Corey Perry (1) – 02:21; Nikita Kucherov (1) – pp – 09:57		Second period	07:47 – Michael Bunting (1)
Brandon Hagel (1) – 01:33; Brayden Point (1) – pp – 05:38		Third period	11:53 – Mitch Marner (2); 15:43 – sh – Alexander Kerfoot (1)
Andrei Vasilevskiy 31 saves / 34 shots		Goalie stats	Jack Campbell 29 saves / 34 shots

May 6	Toronto Maple Leafs	5–2	Tampa Bay Lightning	Amalie Arena	Recap
Morgan Rielly (1) – pp – 04:54; Colin Blackwell (1) – 09:44		First period	No scoring
David Kampf (2) – 05:52		Second period	11:03 – pp – Ross Colton (1)
Ilya Mikheyev (1) – en – 18:20; Ilya Mikheyev (2) – en – 19:55		Third period	05:43 – Ondrej Palat (1)
Jack Campbell 32 saves / 34 shots		Goalie stats	Andrei Vasilevskiy 31 saves / 34 shots

May 8	Toronto Maple Leafs	3–7	Tampa Bay Lightning	Amalie Arena	Recap
No scoring		First period	01:00 – Steven Stamkos (1); 05:20 – Pierre-Edouard Bellemare (1); 07:58 – Patrick Maroon (1)
No scoring		Second period	03:17 – Ross Colton (2); 05:25 – pp – Corey Perry (2)
William Nylander (1) – pp – 02:27; William Nylander (2) – 12:01; Jake Muzzin (2) – 15:41		Third period	14:40 – en – Ondrej Palat (2); 17:44 – en – Ross Colton (3)
Jack Campbell 11 saves / 16 shots Erik Kallgren 10 saves / 10 shots		Goalie stats	Andrei Vasilevskiy 22 saves / 25 shots

May 10	Tampa Bay Lightning	3–4	Toronto Maple Leafs	Scotiabank Arena	Recap
Steven Stamkos (2) – 05:19; Victor Hedman (2) – pp – 06:11		First period	No scoring
No scoring		Second period	03:35 – pp – John Tavares (1)
Ryan McDonagh (1) – 08:17		Third period	03:01 – Morgan Rielly (2); 04:14 – William Nylander (3); 13:54 – Auston Matthews (3)
Andrei Vasilevskiy 21 saves / 25 shots		Goalie stats	Jack Campbell 32 saves / 35 shots

May 12	Toronto Maple Leafs	3–4	OT	Tampa Bay Lightning	Amalie Arena	Recap
No scoring		First period		17:38 – Ondrej Palat (3)
Auston Matthews (4) – 11:40; John Tavares (2) – 19:26; John Tavares (3) – 19:52		Second period		10:46 – sh – Anthony Cirelli (1)
No scoring		Third period		09:20 – pp – Nikita Kucherov (2)
No scoring		First overtime period		18:04 – Brayden Point (2)
Jack Campbell 31 saves / 35 shots		Goalie stats		Andrei Vasilevskiy 30 saves / 33 shots

May 14	Tampa Bay Lightning	2–1	Toronto Maple Leafs	Scotiabank Arena	Recap
Nick Paul (1) – 18:24		First period	No scoring
Nick Paul (2) – 16:32		Second period	13:25 – Morgan Rielly (3)
No scoring		Third period	No scoring
Andrei Vasilevskiy 30 saves / 31 shots		Goalie stats	Jack Campbell 23 saves / 25 shots

Tampa Bay won series 4–3

==== (M1) Carolina Hurricanes vs. (WC1) Boston Bruins ====
The Carolina Hurricanes finished first in the Metropolitan Division earning 116 points. Boston finished as the Eastern Conference's first wild card earning 107 points. This was the seventh playoff meeting between these two teams, with Boston winning five of the six previous series. They last met in the 2020 Eastern Conference first round, which Boston won in five games. Carolina won all three games in this year's regular season series.

The Hurricanes defeated the Bruins in seven games, with the home team victorious in every game. Antti Raanta made 35 saves in game one, backstopping the Hurricanes in a 5–1 victory. Upon Hurricanes forward Nino Niederreiter's two goals and Pyotr Kochetkov's 30 saves in relief of Raanta in game two, Carolina gained 2–0 series lead by defeating Boston 5–2. In game three, Brad Marchand scored a goal and provided two assists in the Bruins' 4–2 victory. In game four, Marchand scored or provided an assist on every Bruins goal in Boston's 5–2 victory, tying the series 2–2. In game five, Seth Jarvis scored twice and Teuvo Teravainen assisted thrice in the Hurricanes 5–1 victory, taking a 3–2 series lead in the process. In game six, Charlie Coyle and Marchand each scored a goal and provided an assist in the Bruins' 5–2 victory tying the series 3–3. Max Domi scored twice and added an assist in game seven, granting Carolina a 3–2 victory and an advancement to the second round.

May 2	Boston Bruins	1–5	Carolina Hurricanes	PNC Arena	Recap
No scoring		First period	No scoring
No scoring		Second period	16:28 – Seth Jarvis (1); 18:38 – Nino Niederreiter (1)
Taylor Hall (1) – 02:53		Third period	07:02 – Teuvo Teravainen (1); 16:59 – Vincent Trocheck (1); 17:59 – en – Andrei Svechnikov (1)
Linus Ullmark 20 saves / 24 shots		Goalie stats	Antti Raanta 35 saves / 36 shots

May 4	Boston Bruins	2–5	Carolina Hurricanes	PNC Arena	Recap
No scoring		First period	13:03 – Jesper Fast (1); 15:30 – Sebastian Aho (1)
Patrice Bergeron (1) – pp – 14:57		Second period	01:10 – pp – Sebastian Aho (2); 18:52 – pp – Nino Niederreiter (2)
Patrice Bergeron (2) – 12:21		Third period	19:19 – en – Nino Niederreiter (3)
Linus Ullmark 29 saves / 33 shots		Goalie stats	Antti Raanta 6 saves / 6 shots Pyotr Kochetkov 30 saves / 32 shots

May 6	Carolina Hurricanes	2–4	Boston Bruins	TD Garden	Recap
Vincent Trocheck (2) – 09:17		First period	17:16 – sh – Charlie Coyle (1)
No scoring		Second period	05:41 – Brad Marchand (1); 14:53 – pp – David Pastrnak (1)
Jaccob Slavin (1) – 11:30		Third period	04:08 – pp – Taylor Hall (2)
Pyotr Kochetkov 24 saves / 28 shots		Goalie stats	Jeremy Swayman 25 saves / 27 shots

May 8	Carolina Hurricanes	2–5	Boston Bruins	TD Garden	Recap
Brett Pesce (1) – 14:06		First period	16:09 – Patrice Bergeron (3)
Jordan Staal (1) – 00:33		Second period	18:44 – pp – Jake DeBrusk (1)
No scoring		Third period	00:43 – pp – Brad Marchand (2); 05:41 – David Pastrnak (2); 19:25 – en – Brad Marchand (3)
Antti Raanta 23 saves / 27 shots		Goalie stats	Jeremy Swayman 24 saves / 26 shots

May 10	Boston Bruins	1–5	Carolina Hurricanes	PNC Arena	Recap
No scoring		First period	06:11 – Jaccob Slavin (2); 12:17 – pp – Tony DeAngelo (1)
No scoring		Second period	15:52 – Seth Jarvis (2)
Connor Clifton (1) – 10:09		Third period	03:31 – pp – Seth Jarvis (3); 16:20 – en – Vincent Trocheck (3)
Jeremy Swayman 33 saves / 37 shots		Goalie stats	Antti Raanta 33 saves / 34 shots

May 12	Carolina Hurricanes	2–5	Boston Bruins	TD Garden	Recap
No scoring		First period	No scoring
No scoring		Second period	00:46 – Brad Marchand (4); 18:04 – pp – Charlie Coyle (2)
Andrei Svechnikov (2) – 03:24; Andrei Svechnikov (3) – pp – 17:30		Third period	07:08 – Erik Haula (1); 10:43 – Derek Forbort (1); 15:43 – en – Curtis Lazar (1)
Antti Raanta 29 saves / 33 shots		Goalie stats	Jeremy Swayman 23 saves / 25 shots

May 14	Boston Bruins	2–3	Carolina Hurricanes	PNC Arena	Recap
No scoring		First period	18:36 – Teuvo Teravainen (2)
Jake DeBrusk (2) – 05:04		Second period	03:14 – Max Domi (1); 10:33 – Max Domi (2)
David Pastrnak (3) – 19:38		Third period	No scoring
Jeremy Swayman 28 saves / 31 shots		Goalie stats	Antti Raanta 27 saves / 29 shots

Carolina won series 4–3

==== (M2) New York Rangers vs. (M3) Pittsburgh Penguins ====
The New York Rangers finished second in the Metropolitan Division with 110 points. The Pittsburgh Penguins earned 103 points to finish third in the Metropolitan Division. This was the eighth playoff meeting between these two teams with Pittsburgh winning five of the seven previous series. They last met in the 2016 Eastern Conference first round, which Pittsburgh won in five games. New York won three of the four games in this year's regular season series.

The Rangers came back from a 3–1 series deficit to defeat the Penguins in seven games. In game one, although Igor Shesterkin made 79 saves for the Rangers, Penguins forward Evgeni Malkin scored for Pittsburgh at 5:58 of triple overtime to win 4–3. In game two, Artemi Panarin and Frank Vatrano both scored a goal and provided two assists in the Rangers' 5–2 victory. In game three, although the Rangers tied the game after being down 4–1, Penguins forward Danton Heinen's goal proved to be the game-winning goal at 11:02 of the third period giving Pittsburgh a 7–4 victory. The Penguins scored five times in the second period of game four, chasing goalie Shesterkin in a 7–2 rout. In game five, the Rangers successfully came back from a two-goal deficit to win 5–3, forcing a sixth game. Chris Kreider gave the Rangers a lead late in the third period of game six, giving his team a 5–3 victory and tying the series 3–3. In game seven and the subsequent overtime, Panarin scored for New York sending the Rangers to the second round with a 4–3 victory. This marked the first time the Penguins lost a game seven on the road in franchise history after winning the previous six instances. The Rangers equalled both the Montreal Canadiens and Vancouver Canucks for most comebacks from a 3–1 series deficit with three. The Rangers also became the first team in Stanley Cup playoff history to record three consecutive comeback wins in elimination games within the same series.

May 3	Pittsburgh Penguins	4–3	3OT	New York Rangers	Madison Square Garden	Recap
No scoring		First period		09:19 – pp – Adam Fox (1)
Jake Guentzel (1) – 04:32; Jake Guentzel (2) – 11:47; Bryan Rust (1) – pp – 18:30		Second period		03:08 – Andrew Copp (1); 17:07 – sh – Chris Kreider (1)
No scoring		Third period		No scoring
Evgeni Malkin (1) – 05:58		Third overtime period		No scoring
Casey DeSmith 48 saves / 51 shots Louis Domingue 17 saves / 17 shots		Goalie stats		Igor Shesterkin 79 saves / 83 shots

May 5	Pittsburgh Penguins	2–5	New York Rangers	Madison Square Garden	Recap
Jake Guentzel (3) – 08:52		First period	06:50 – Andrew Copp (2)
Sidney Crosby (1) – 18:34		Second period	02:59 – pp – Ryan Strome (1); 12:06 – Chris Kreider (2)
No scoring		Third period	08:02 – Artemi Panarin (1); 09:49 – Frank Vatrano (1)
Louis Domingue 35 saves / 40 shots		Goalie stats	Igor Shesterkin 39 saves / 41 shots

May 7	New York Rangers	4–7	Pittsburgh Penguins	PPG Paints Arena	Recap
Kaapo Kakko (1) – 05:08		First period	01:57 – Brock McGinn (1); 08:18 – pp – Jeff Carter (1); 10:31 – pp – Evan Rodrigues (1); 15:15 – Evan Rodrigues (2)
Frank Vatrano (2) – 06:51; Artemi Panarin (2) – 07:58; Andrew Copp (3) – sh – 15:59		Second period	No scoring
No scoring		Third period	11:02 – Danton Heinen (1); 17:46 – en – Jake Guentzel (4); 18:53 – en – Jeff Carter (2)
Igor Shesterkin 11 saves / 15 shots Alexandar Georgiev 19 saves / 20 shots		Goalie stats	Louis Domingue 32 saves / 36 shots

May 9	New York Rangers	2–7	Pittsburgh Penguins	PPG Paints Arena	Recap
Alexis Lafreniere (1) – 02:06		First period	11:17 – pp – Sidney Crosby (2)
Adam Fox (2) – 14:04		Second period	03:14 – Mike Matheson (1); 03:38 – Jake Guentzel (5); 11:22 – Mark Friedman (1); 18:53 – Danton Heinen (2); 19:28 – Jeff Carter (3)
No scoring		Third period	12:22 – Evgeni Malkin (2)
Igor Shesterkin 24 saves / 30 shots Alexandar Georgiev 10 saves / 11 shots		Goalie stats	Louis Domingue 22 saves / 24 shots

May 11	Pittsburgh Penguins	3–5	New York Rangers	Madison Square Garden	Recap
Jake Guentzel (6) – 10:28		First period	No scoring
Kris Letang (1) – 07:58; Jake Guentzel (7) – 18:06		Second period	15:11 – Adam Fox (3); 16:41 – Alexis Lafreniere (2); 17:53 – Jacob Trouba (1)
No scoring		Third period	02:53 – pp – Filip Chytil (1); 19:44 – en – Ryan Lindgren (1)
Louis Domingue 29 saves / 33 shots		Goalie stats	Igor Shesterkin 29 saves / 32 shots

May 13	New York Rangers	5–3	Pittsburgh Penguins	PPG Paints Arena	Recap
No scoring		First period	14:12 – Jeff Carter (4); 15:48 – Bryan Rust (2)
Mika Zibanejad (1) – pp – 05:05; Mika Zibanejad (2) – 06:21; Chris Kreider (3) – pp – 13:48		Second period	16:36 – Evgeni Malkin (3)
Chris Kreider (4) – 18:32; Andrew Copp (4) – en – 19:33		Third period	No scoring
Igor Shesterkin 31 saves / 34 shots		Goalie stats	Louis Domingue 33 saves / 37 shots

May 15	Pittsburgh Penguins	3–4	OT	New York Rangers	Madison Square Garden	Recap
Danton Heinen (3) – pp – 18:51		First period		07:36 – Chris Kreider (5)
Jake Guentzel (8) – pp – 10:18; Evan Rodrigues (3) – sh – 17:24		Second period		11:23 – K'Andre Miller (1)
No scoring		Third period		14:15 – Mika Zibanejad (3)
No scoring		First overtime period		04:46 – pp – Artemi Panarin (3)
Tristan Jarry 26 saves / 30 shots		Goalie stats		Igor Shesterkin 39 saves / 42 shots

New York won series 4–3

=== Western Conference first round ===
==== (C1) Colorado Avalanche vs. (WC2) Nashville Predators ====
The Colorado Avalanche finished first in the Central Division and Western Conference earning 119 points. The Nashville Predators earned 97 points to finish as the Western Conference's second wild card. This was the second playoff meeting between these two teams. Their only previous meeting was in the 2018 Western Conference first round, which Nashville won in six games. Nashville won three of the four games in this year's regular season series.

The Avalanche defeated the Predators in a four-game sweep. Colorado scored five times in the first period of game one, forcing Nashville to switch goalies in a 7–2 affair. In game two, the Avalanche shot 51 times at Predators' goalie Connor Ingram and at 8:31 of overtime, Cale Makar scored to give Colorado a 2–1 victory. Gabriel Landeskog scored and assisted twice in game three, helping the Avalanche obtain both a 7–3 victory and 3–0 series lead. In game four, Andre Burakovsky's goal and two assists helped lift the Avalanche to a 5–3 victory, advancing to the second round.

May 3	Nashville Predators	2–7	Colorado Avalanche	Ball Arena	Recap
No scoring		First period	02:20 – pp – Nathan MacKinnon (1); 02:42 – Devon Toews (1); 08:30 – sh – Andrew Cogliano (1); 12:15 – Cale Makar (1); 15:04 – Artturi Lehkonen (1)
Matt Duchene (1) – pp – 18:40		Second period	14:44 – pp – Gabriel Landeskog (1)
Matt Duchene (2) – 12:26		Third period	06:03 – Nathan MacKinnon (2)
David Rittich 8 saves / 13 shots Connor Ingram 30 saves / 32 shots		Goalie stats	Darcy Kuemper 23 saves / 25 shots

May 5	Nashville Predators	1–2	OT	Colorado Avalanche	Ball Arena	Recap
Yakov Trenin (1) – 15:19		First period		05:25 – Nathan MacKinnon (3)
No scoring		Second period		No scoring
No scoring		Third period		No scoring
No scoring		First overtime period		08:31 – Cale Makar (2)
Connor Ingram 49 saves / 51 shots		Goalie stats		Darcy Kuemper 25 saves / 26 shots

May 7	Colorado Avalanche	7–3	Nashville Predators	Bridgestone Arena	Recap
Artturi Lehkonen (2) – pp – 10:45; Nathan MacKinnon (4) – pp – 16:08		First period	17:37 – Matt Duchene (3)
Gabriel Landeskog (2) – pp – 10:58; Gabriel Landeskog (3) – 14:02; Nazem Kadri (1) – pp – 14:41		Second period	05:41 – pp – Eeli Tolvanen (1); 12:54 – pp – Roman Josi (1)
Devon Toews (2) – 09:33; Valeri Nichushkin (1) – en – 17:14		Third period	No scoring
Darcy Kuemper 9 saves / 10 shots Pavel Francouz 18 saves / 20 shots		Goalie stats	Connor Ingram 35 saves / 41 shots

May 9	Colorado Avalanche	5–3	Nashville Predators	Bridgestone Arena	Recap
Andre Burakovsky (1) – 01:56		First period	18:59 – Yakov Trenin (2)
Cale Makar (3) – 13:33		Second period	16:49 – Yakov Trenin (3)
Devon Toews (3) – 08:55; Valeri Nichushkin (2) – 12:02; Nathan MacKinnon (5) – pp-en – 19:04		Third period	03:58 – Filip Forsberg (1)
Pavel Francouz 28 saves / 31 shots		Goalie stats	Connor Ingram 33 saves / 37 shots

Colorado won series 4–0

==== (C2) Minnesota Wild vs. (C3) St. Louis Blues ====
The Minnesota Wild finished second in the Central Division earning 113 points. The St. Louis Blues earned 109 points to finish third in the Central Division. This was the third playoff meeting between these teams with the teams splitting the two previous series. They last met in the 2017 Western Conference first round, which St. Louis won in five games. St. Louis won all three games in this year's regular season series.

The Blues defeated the Wild in six games. In game one, Ville Husso made 37 saves for the Blues and David Perron scored a hat trick in St. Louis' 4–0 victory. The Wild returned with a hat trick of their own in game two when Kirill Kaprizov scored Minnesota's first playoff hat trick in a 6–2 victory. Marc-Andre Fleury made 29 saves for the Wild in game three, backstopping Minnesota into a 5–1 victory. Blues captain Ryan O'Reilly scored a goal and two assists in game four, leading St. Louis to a 5–2 victory. Vladimir Tarasenko scored a hat trick in game five spearheading his team to another 5–2 victory and a 3–2 series lead. In game six, Jordan Binnington made 25 saves for the Blues, defeating the Wild 5–1 and advancing to the second round.

May 2	St. Louis Blues	4–0	Minnesota Wild	Xcel Energy Center	Recap
David Perron (1) – pp – 06:15; Ryan O'Reilly (1) – 15:56		First period	No scoring
David Perron (2) – pp – 16:30		Second period	No scoring
David Perron (3) – 12:34		Third period	No scoring
Ville Husso 37 saves / 37 shots		Goalie stats	Marc-Andre Fleury 27 saves / 31 shots

May 4	St. Louis Blues	2–6	Minnesota Wild	Xcel Energy Center	Recap
No scoring		First period	09:33 – Joel Eriksson Ek (1); 13:04 – pp – Frederick Gaudreau (1); 19:06 – pp – Kirill Kaprizov (1)
Jordan Kyrou (1) – pp – 12:34		Second period	00:51 – Joel Eriksson Ek (2)
Vladimir Tarasenko (1) – 04:14		Third period	11:47 – Kirill Kaprizov (2); 12:52 – en – Kirill Kaprizov (3)
Ville Husso 22 saves / 27 shots		Goalie stats	Marc-Andre Fleury 32 saves / 34 shots

May 6	Minnesota Wild	5–1	St. Louis Blues	Enterprise Center	Recap
Jordan Greenway (1) – 00:39; Kirill Kaprizov (4) – 02:18		First period	No scoring
Mats Zuccarello (1) – 07:44		Second period	No scoring
Joel Eriksson Ek (3) – 00:22; Jonas Brodin (1) – en – 12:31		Third period	02:17 – pp – Ryan O'Reilly (2)
Marc-Andre Fleury 29 saves / 30 shots		Goalie stats	Ville Husso 28 saves / 32 shots

May 8	Minnesota Wild	2–5	St. Louis Blues	Enterprise Center	Recap
Kirill Kaprizov (5) – 14:06		First period	04:19 – Jordan Kyrou (2)
No scoring		Second period	10:30 – David Perron (4); 11:24 – Jordan Kyrou (3)
Matthew Boldy (1) – 02:39		Third period	18:02 – en – David Perron (5); 19:00 – pp – Ryan O'Reilly (3)
Marc-Andre Fleury 29 saves / 33 shots		Goalie stats	Jordan Binnington 28 saves / 30 shots

May 10	St. Louis Blues	5–2	Minnesota Wild	Xcel Energy Center	Recap
Ryan O'Reilly (4) – pp – 04:53		First period	13:15 – pp – Kirill Kaprizov (6); 17:07 – pp – Kirill Kaprizov (7)
Brandon Saad (1) – 15:28		Second period	No scoring
Vladimir Tarasenko (2) – 01:03; Vladimir Tarasenko (3) – 02:31; Vladimir Tarasenko (4) – en – 18:27		Third period	No scoring
Jordan Binnington 30 saves / 32 shots		Goalie stats	Marc-Andre Fleury 27 saves / 31 shots

May 12	Minnesota Wild	1–5	St. Louis Blues	Enterprise Center	Recap
No scoring		First period	14:59 – Nick Leddy (1)
No scoring		Second period	09:26 – pp – Ryan O'Reilly (5); 13:25 – Tyler Bozak (1); 18:36 – pp – Vladimir Tarasenko (5)
Matt Dumba (1) – 06:25		Third period	18:19 – en – Colton Parayko (1)
Cam Talbot 22 saves / 26 shots		Goalie stats	Jordan Binnington 25 saves / 26 shots

St. Louis won series 4–2

==== (P1) Calgary Flames vs. (WC1) Dallas Stars ====
The Calgary Flames finished first in the Pacific Division earning 111 points. The Dallas Stars finished as the Western Conference's first wild card earning 98 points. This was the third playoff meeting between these two teams with Dallas winning both previous series. They last met in the 2020 Western Conference first round, which Dallas won in six games. Calgary won two of the three games in this year's regular season series.

The Flames defeated the Stars in seven games. In game one, Calgary's defence limited the Stars' offence to 16 shots as goalie Jacob Markstrom claimed a 1–0 victory. The Stars responded with their own shutout victory in game two, scoring twice in a 2–0 affair with Jake Oettinger making 29 saves in the process. Joe Pavelski led the Stars with two goals in game three, giving Dallas a 4–2 victory and a 2–1 series lead. The Flames put 54 shots on the Stars goaltender, and with four shots turning into goals, Calgary won game four, 4–1. In game five, Mikael Backlund and Andrew Mangiapane each scored a goal and provided an assist in Calgary's 3–1 comeback victory. In game six, Oettinger made 36 saves for the Stars leading his team to a 4–2 victory and forcing a seventh game. The Flames put on 67 shots in game seven, but with two finding the back of the net on both sides, the game went into overtime. In the extra period, Calgary forward Johnny Gaudreau scored to give the Flames a 3–2 victory and a second round advancement. In the loss, Oettinger became the second goalie since 1955 to post 60 or more saves in a seventh game.

May 3	Dallas Stars	0–1	Calgary Flames	Scotiabank Saddledome	Recap
No scoring		First period	05:01 – pp – Elias Lindholm (1)
No scoring		Second period	No scoring
No scoring		Third period	No scoring
Jake Oettinger 25 saves / 26 shots		Goalie stats	Jacob Markstrom 16 saves / 16 shots

May 5	Dallas Stars	2–0	Calgary Flames	Scotiabank Saddledome	Recap
Joe Pavelski (1) – 07:47		First period	No scoring
No scoring		Second period	No scoring
Michael Raffl (1) – en – 18:51		Third period	No scoring
Jake Oettinger 29 saves / 29 shots		Goalie stats	Jacob Markstrom 21 saves / 22 shots

May 7	Calgary Flames	2–4	Dallas Stars	American Airlines Center	Recap
Trevor Lewis (1) – 13:45		First period	08:21 – Radek Faksa (1)
Elias Lindholm (2) – 03:40		Second period	11:41 – Joe Pavelski (2)
No scoring		Third period	10:05 – pp – Joe Pavelski (3); 19:59 – en – Roope Hintz (1)
Jacob Markstrom 28 saves / 31 shots		Goalie stats	Jake Oettinger 39 saves / 41 shots

May 9	Calgary Flames	4–1	Dallas Stars	American Airlines Center	Recap
No scoring		First period	No scoring
Rasmus Andersson (1) – pp – 10:03		Second period	No scoring
Johnny Gaudreau (1) – ps – 07:47; Elias Lindholm (3) – 11:53; Mikael Backlund (1) – en – 19:38		Third period	15:03 – pp – Tyler Seguin (1)
Jacob Markstrom 34 saves / 35 shots		Goalie stats	Jake Oettinger 50 saves / 53 shots

May 11	Dallas Stars	1–3	Calgary Flames	Scotiabank Saddledome	Recap
No scoring		First period	No scoring
Jason Robertson (1) – 13:21		Second period	No scoring
No scoring		Third period	06:49 – Mikael Backlund (2); 10:38 – Andrew Mangiapane (1); 19:02 – en – Trevor Lewis (2)
Jake Oettinger 29 saves / 31 shots		Goalie stats	Jacob Markstrom 20 saves / 21 shots

May 13	Calgary Flames	2–4	Dallas Stars	American Airlines Center	Recap
No scoring		First period	14:52 – Roope Hintz (2)
Michael Stone (1) – 08:09; Mikael Backlund (3) – 11:59		Second period	06:04 – Michael Raffl (2); 17:32 – Miro Heiskanen (1)
No scoring		Third period	19:18 – en – Tyler Seguin (2)
Jacob Markstrom 36 saves / 39 shots		Goalie stats	Jake Oettinger 36 saves / 38 shots

May 15	Dallas Stars	2–3	OT	Calgary Flames	Scotiabank Saddledome	Recap
Jamie Benn (1) – 00:40		First period		No scoring
Vladislav Namestnikov (1) – 02:17		Second period		01:46 – Tyler Toffoli (1); 08:44 – Matthew Tkachuk (1)
No scoring		Third period		No scoring
No scoring		First overtime period		15:09 – Johnny Gaudreau (2)
Jake Oettinger 64 saves / 67 shots		Goalie stats		Jacob Markstrom 26 saves / 28 shots

Calgary won series 4–3

==== (P2) Edmonton Oilers vs. (P3) Los Angeles Kings ====
The Edmonton Oilers finished second in the Pacific Division with 104 points. The Los Angeles Kings earned 99 points to finish third in the Pacific Division. This was the eighth playoff meeting between these two rivals with Edmonton winning five of the seven previous series. They last met in the 1992 Smythe Division Semifinals, which Edmonton won in six games. Edmonton won three of the four games in this year's regular season series.

The Oilers defeated the Kings in seven games. In game one, Phillip Danault's goal with 5:14 left in the third period proved to be the game-winning goal for the Kings who edged the Oilers 4–3. Mike Smith stopped all 30 shots in game two, ending his ten-game playoff losing streak with a 6–0 shutout victory. The Oilers dominated game three, forcing Los Angeles to switch goalies and giving Evander Kane a hat trick in the process of an 8–2 rout. Jonathan Quick claimed a 31-save shutout in game four, backstopping the Kings to a 4–0 victory. In the process, he became the leading United States-born goalie in playoff shutouts with 10. In game five, the Oilers came back from a two-goal deficit to tie the contest; however Kings forward Adrian Kempe's overtime goal, his second score of the affair, gave Los Angeles the 5–4 victory and a 3–2 series lead. In game six, Connor McDavid scored a goal and provided two assists in the Oilers' 4–2 victory, forcing a seventh game in Edmonton. In game seven, McDavid scored and assisted in a 2–0 victory as they advanced to the second round.

May 2	Los Angeles Kings	4–3	Edmonton Oilers	Rogers Place	Recap
Trevor Moore (1) – 11:00; Alex Iafallo (1) – 16:48		First period	19:17 – Connor McDavid (1)
Brendan Lemieux (1) – 03:50		Second period	02:39 – pp – Kailer Yamamoto (1); 09:56 – pp – Leon Draisaitl (1)
Phillip Danault (1) – 14:46		Third period	No scoring
Jonathan Quick 36 saves / 39 shots		Goalie stats	Mike Smith 31 saves / 35 shots

May 4	Los Angeles Kings	0–6	Edmonton Oilers	Rogers Place	Recap
No scoring		First period	No scoring
No scoring		Second period	01:22 – pp – Leon Draisaitl (2); 06:03 – sh – Darnell Nurse (1); 16:05 – Ryan McLeod (1)
No scoring		Third period	03:02 – Evander Kane (1); 03:23 – Jesse Puljujarvi (1); 11:55 – pp – Evander Kane (2)
Jonathan Quick 30 saves / 36 shots		Goalie stats	Mike Smith 30 saves / 30 shots

May 6	Edmonton Oilers	8–2	Los Angeles Kings	Crypto.com Arena	Recap
Leon Draisaitl (3) – 03:50; Zach Hyman (1) – pp – 06:07		First period	No scoring
Evander Kane (3) – 06:27; Zach Hyman (2) – 07:42; Evander Kane (4) – 09:51		Second period	10:07 – Anze Kopitar (1); 17:29 – pp – Phillip Danault (2)
Ryan Nugent-Hopkins (1) – 14:19; Ryan Nugent-Hopkins (2) – 15:40; Evander Kane (5) – 19:40		Third period	No scoring
Mike Smith 44 saves / 46 shots		Goalie stats	Jonathan Quick 13 saves / 17 shots Cal Petersen 16 saves / 20 shots

May 8	Edmonton Oilers	0–4	Los Angeles Kings	Crypto.com Arena	Recap
No scoring		First period	08:03 – Trevor Moore (2); 14:03 – Troy Stecher (1)
No scoring		Second period	No scoring
No scoring		Third period	15:06 – Carl Grundstrom (1); 18:29 – en – Carl Grundstrom (2)
Mike Smith 42 saves / 45 shots		Goalie stats	Jonathan Quick 31 saves / 31 shots

May 10	Los Angeles Kings	5–4	OT	Edmonton Oilers	Rogers Place	Recap
Troy Stecher (2) – 03:53		First period		No scoring
Adrian Kempe (1) – 09:29; Andreas Athanasiou (1) – 13:34		Second period		02:32 – Zack Kassian (1)
Phillip Danault (3) – pp – 11:06		Third period		02:50 – pp – Connor McDavid (2); 12:33 – sh – Leon Draisaitl (4); 15:08 – pp – Leon Draisaitl (5)
Adrian Kempe (2) – 01:12		First overtime period		No scoring
Jonathan Quick 24 saves / 28 shots		Goalie stats		Mike Smith 38 saves / 43 shots

May 12	Edmonton Oilers	4–2	Los Angeles Kings	Crypto.com Arena	Recap
Connor McDavid (3) – 01:40		First period	No scoring
Evander Kane (6) – 01:50		Second period	13:59 – pp – Sean Durzi (1)
Tyson Barrie (1) – 14:50; Evander Kane (7) – en – 19:00		Third period	00:29 – Carl Grundstrom (3)
Mike Smith 30 saves / 32 shots		Goalie stats	Jonathan Quick 33 saves / 36 shots

May 14	Los Angeles Kings	0–2	Edmonton Oilers	Rogers Place	Recap
No scoring		First period	No scoring
No scoring		Second period	13:15 – Cody Ceci (1)
No scoring		Third period	16:07 – Connor McDavid (4)
Jonathan Quick 39 saves / 41 shots		Goalie stats	Mike Smith 29 saves / 29 shots

Edmonton won series 4–3

== Second round ==
=== Eastern Conference second round ===
==== (A1) Florida Panthers vs. (A3) Tampa Bay Lightning ====
This was the second consecutive and the second overall playoff meeting between these two rivals. Tampa Bay won the previous year's Stanley Cup first round series in six games. These teams split their four-game regular season series.

The Lightning defeated the Panthers in a four-game sweep. In game one, Corey Perry and Nikita Kucherov both scored a goal and assisted in Tampa Bay's 4–1 victory. Ross Colton's goal with 3.8 seconds left in game two provided Tampa Bay with a 2–1 victory and a 2–0 series lead. Kucherov scored a goal and assisted three times in the Lightning's 5–1 victory of game three, who took a 3–0 series lead in the process. In game four, Andrei Vasilevskiy made 49 saves in a 2–0 shutout, advancing the Lightning to the Conference finals for the third consecutive season. With their victory, they became the first team since the 1980–1984 New York Islanders dynasty to win ten consecutive playoff series and they equalled the 1956–1960 Montreal Canadiens in consecutive series victories.

May 17	Tampa Bay Lightning	4–1	Florida Panthers	FLA Live Arena	Recap
No scoring		First period	14:01 – Anthony Duclair (1)
Corey Perry (3) – pp – 16:22		Second period	No scoring
Pierre-Edouard Bellemare (2) – 03:35; Nikita Kucherov (3) – pp – 15:54; Ross Colton (4) – pp – 17:44		Third period	No scoring
Andrei Vasilevskiy 33 saves / 34 shots		Goalie stats	Sergei Bobrovsky 32 saves / 36 shots

May 19	Tampa Bay Lightning	2–1	Florida Panthers	FLA Live Arena	Recap
Corey Perry (4) – pp – 12:06		First period	No scoring
No scoring		Second period	18:07 – Eetu Luostarinen (1)
Ross Colton (5) – 19:56		Third period	No scoring
Andrei Vasilevskiy 35 saves / 36 shots		Goalie stats	Sergei Bobrovsky 26 saves / 28 shots

May 22	Florida Panthers	1–5	Tampa Bay Lightning	Amalie Arena	Recap
Sam Reinhart (3) – pp – 16:07		First period	13:21 – Corey Perry (5)
No scoring		Second period	02:54 – Erik Cernak (1); 10:23 – Steven Stamkos (3)
No scoring		Third period	16:06 – en – Nikita Kucherov (4); 17:51 – en – Steven Stamkos (4)
Sergei Bobrovsky 31 saves / 34 shots		Goalie stats	Andrei Vasilevskiy 34 saves / 35 shots

May 23	Florida Panthers	0–2	Tampa Bay Lightning	Amalie Arena	Recap
No scoring		First period	No scoring
No scoring		Second period	No scoring
No scoring		Third period	06:16 – Patrick Maroon (2); 19:37 – en – Ondrej Palat (4)
Sergei Bobrovsky 24 saves / 25 shots		Goalie stats	Andrei Vasilevskiy 49 saves / 49 shots

Tampa Bay won series 4–0

==== (M1) Carolina Hurricanes vs. (M2) New York Rangers ====
This was the second playoff meeting between these two teams. Their only previous meeting was in the 2020 Eastern Conference qualifying round, which Carolina won in a three-game sweep. Carolina won three of the four games in this year's regular season series.

The Rangers defeated the Hurricanes in seven games. After Sebastian Aho tied the game late for Carolina in game one, Ian Cole scored in overtime to give the Hurricanes a 2–1 victory. In game two, Aho scored a goal and provided an assist in Antti Raanta's 21 save shutout for the Hurricanes' 2–0 victory. The Rangers rebounded in game three; aided by Igor Shesterkin's 43 saves, New York defeated Carolina 3–1. In game four, Andrew Copp notched a goal and two assists in the Rangers 4–1 victory, evening the series 2–2. The Hurricanes shot 34 times at Shesterkin in game five, banking in three goals for a 3–1 victory and a 3–2 series lead. In game six, Shesterkin made 37 saves and Filip Chytil scored twice for the Rangers who defeated Carolina 5–2 to force a seventh game. New York shut the door on Carolina in game seven, outscoring the Hurricanes 6–2 to advance to the conference final for the first time since 2015.

May 18	New York Rangers	1–2	OT	Carolina Hurricanes	PNC Arena	Recap
Filip Chytil (2) – 07:07		First period		No scoring
No scoring		Second period		No scoring
No scoring		Third period		17:37 – Sebastian Aho (3)
No scoring		First overtime period		03:12 – Ian Cole (1)
Igor Shesterkin 24 saves / 26 shots		Goalie stats		Antti Raanta 27 saves / 28 shots

May 20	New York Rangers	0–2	Carolina Hurricanes	PNC Arena	Recap
No scoring		First period	No scoring
No scoring		Second period	15:54 – sh – Brendan Smith (1)
No scoring		Third period	19:58 – en – Sebastian Aho (4)
Igor Shesterkin 20 saves / 21 shots		Goalie stats	Antti Raanta 21 saves / 21 shots

May 22	Carolina Hurricanes	1–3	New York Rangers	Madison Square Garden	Recap
No scoring		First period	11:54 – pp – Mika Zibanejad (4)
Nino Niederreiter (4) – 08:18		Second period	05:55 – Chris Kreider (6)
No scoring		Third period	18:37 – en – Tyler Motte (1)
Antti Raanta 30 saves / 32 shots		Goalie stats	Igor Shesterkin 43 saves / 44 shots

May 24	Carolina Hurricanes	1–4	New York Rangers	Madison Square Garden	Recap
No scoring		First period	13:31 – pp – Frank Vatrano (3); 15:42 – Adam Fox (4)
No scoring		Second period	16:48 – Mika Zibanejad (5)
Teuvo Teravainen (3) – 06:33		Third period	11:10 – Andrew Copp (5)
Antti Raanta 24 saves / 28 shots		Goalie stats	Igor Shesterkin 30 saves / 31 shots

May 26	New York Rangers	1–3	Carolina Hurricanes	PNC Arena	Recap
Mika Zibanejad (6) – pp – 17:06		First period	12:57 – sh – Vincent Trocheck (4)
No scoring		Second period	09:47 – pp – Teuvo Teravainen (4)
No scoring		Third period	13:01 – Andrei Svechnikov (4)
Igor Shesterkin 31 saves / 34 shots		Goalie stats	Antti Raanta 16 saves / 17 shots

May 28	Carolina Hurricanes	2–5	New York Rangers	Madison Square Garden	Recap
No scoring		First period	07:22 – Tyler Motte (2); 09:51 – pp – Mika Zibanejad (7)
Brady Skjei (1) – 05:05; Vincent Trocheck (5) – 12:47		Second period	03:24 – Filip Chytil (3); 06:47 – Filip Chytil (4)
No scoring		Third period	07:43 – pp – Artemi Panarin (4)
Antti Raanta 10 saves / 13 shots Pyotr Kochetkov 10 saves / 12 shots		Goalie stats	Igor Shesterkin 37 saves / 39 shots

May 30	New York Rangers	6–2	Carolina Hurricanes	PNC Arena	Recap
Adam Fox (5) – pp – 03:40; Chris Kreider (7) – pp – 08:00		First period	No scoring
Ryan Strome (2) – 16:19		Second period	No scoring
Chris Kreider (8) – 03:59; Filip Chytil (5) – 08:51; Andrew Copp (6) – en – 17:08		Third period	08:11 – pp – Vincent Trocheck (6); 16:13 – Max Domi (3)
Igor Shesterkin 37 saves / 39 shots		Goalie stats	Antti Raanta 16 saves / 18 shots Pyotr Kochetkov 9 saves / 12 shots

New York won series 4–3

=== Western Conference second round ===
==== (C1) Colorado Avalanche vs. (C3) St. Louis Blues ====
This was the second consecutive playoff meeting and the third overall between these two teams with Colorado winning both previous series. Colorado won the previous year's Stanley Cup first round series in a four-game sweep. Colorado won two of the three games in this year's regular season series.

The Avalanche defeated the Blues in six games. In game one the Avalanche poured 51 shots at Blues goaltender Jordan Binnington, however the final shot in overtime by defenceman Josh Manson gave Colorado a 3–2 victory. David Perron scored twice in game two and with Binnington stopping 30 shots, St. Louis won 4–1. Binnington was injured and knocked out of the remainder of the series in the first period of game three, and Artturi Lehkonen scored twice for the Avalanche, as Colorado downed the Blues 5–2 for a 2–1 series lead. In game four, Nazem Kadri scored a hat trick and provided an assist in the Avalanche's 6–3 victory. Game 5 featured a wild scoring affair as the Avalanche had gained a three-goal lead and lost it, but banking off Nathan MacKinnon's hat trick goal with 2:46 remaining in the third period, Colorado retrieved a one-goal lead. St. Louis managed to tie the game again, and in the subsequent overtime period, Tyler Bozak scored to give the Blues a 5–4 victory. In game six, Darren Helm's goal with 5.6 seconds remaining proved to be the series-winning goal for Colorado, who advanced to the Conference final for the first time since 2002.

May 17	St. Louis Blues	2–3	OT	Colorado Avalanche	Ball Arena	Recap
Ryan O'Reilly (6) – 06:25		First period		No scoring
No scoring		Second period		03:14 – Valeri Nichushkin (3); 11:32 – Sam Girard (1)
Jordan Kyrou (4) – pp – 16:46		Third period		No scoring
No scoring		First overtime period		08:02 – Josh Manson (1)
Jordan Binnington 51 saves / 54 shots		Goalie stats		Darcy Kuemper 23 saves / 25 shots

May 19	St. Louis Blues	4–1	Colorado Avalanche	Ball Arena	Recap
No scoring		First period	No scoring
Jordan Kyrou (5) – 05:45; David Perron (6) – pp – 19:26		Second period	No scoring
David Perron (7) – 10:31; Brandon Saad (2) – en – 18:10		Third period	01:49 – pp – Gabriel Landeskog (4)
Jordan Binnington 30 saves / 31 shots		Goalie stats	Darcy Kuemper 28 saves / 31 shots

May 21	Colorado Avalanche	5–2	St. Louis Blues	Enterprise Center	Recap
Logan O'Connor (1) – 10:57		First period	03:55 – Colton Parayko (2)
Nazem Kadri (2) – 13:38; Artturi Lehkonen (3) – 17:15		Second period	19:30 – Ryan O'Reilly (7)
Gabriel Landeskog (5) – 17:52; Artturi Lehkonen (4) – en – 19:02		Third period	No scoring
Darcy Kuemper 29 saves / 31 shots		Goalie stats	Jordan Binnington 3 saves / 3 shots Ville Husso 19 saves / 23 shots

May 23	Colorado Avalanche	6–3	St. Louis Blues	Enterprise Center	Recap
No scoring		First period	05:07 – David Perron (8)
Erik Johnson (1) – 02:44; Nazem Kadri (3) – 04:07; Devon Toews (4) – 04:26; Nazem Kadri (4) – 07:37		Second period	17:02 – pp – David Perron (9); 19:27 – pp – Pavel Buchnevich (1)
Nazem Kadri (5) – 09:38; Mikko Rantanen (1) – en – 19:58		Third period	No scoring
Darcy Kuemper 17 saves / 20 shots		Goalie stats	Ville Husso 31 saves / 36 shots

May 25	St. Louis Blues	5–4	OT	Colorado Avalanche	Ball Arena	Recap
No scoring		First period		03:51 – Nathan MacKinnon (6); 18:23 – pp – Nathan MacKinnon (7)
Vladimir Tarasenko (6) – 14:42		Second period		04:02 – Gabriel Landeskog (6)
Robert Thomas (1) – 09:57; Jordan Kyrou (6) – 15:14; Robert Thomas (2) – 19:04		Third period		17:14 – Nathan MacKinnon (8)
Tyler Bozak (2) – 03:38		First overtime period		No scoring
Ville Husso 30 saves / 34 shots		Goalie stats		Darcy Kuemper 25 saves / 30 shots

May 27	Colorado Avalanche	3–2	St. Louis Blues	Enterprise Center	Recap
No scoring		First period	19:00 – Justin Faulk (1)
J. T. Compher (1) – 05:19		Second period	09:34 – Jordan Kyrou (7)
J. T. Compher (2) – pp – 10:18; Darren Helm (1) – 19:54		Third period	No scoring
Darcy Kuemper 18 saves / 20 shots		Goalie stats	Ville Husso 36 saves / 39 shots

Colorado won series 4–2

==== (P1) Calgary Flames vs. (P2) Edmonton Oilers ====
This was the sixth playoff meeting between these two rivals with Edmonton winning four of the five previous series and the first second round series between two Canadian-based NHL teams with no all-Canadian division since 2002. They last met in the 1991 Smythe Division semifinals, which Edmonton won in seven games. These teams split their four-game regular season series.

The Oilers defeated the Flames in five games. Game one was an offensive outburst on both sides with a total of fifteen goals, the most in a playoff game within the Battle of Alberta. The Flames, who reached a 6–2 lead, had that advantage disappear as the Oilers tied the game; however two of Matthew Tkachuk's hat trick goals sealed the victory for Calgary in a 9–6 affair. The Oilers successively overcame a two-goal deficit in game two with Leon Draisaitl providing a goal and two assists in a 5–3 victory. The Oilers line of Evander Kane, Connor McDavid, and Draisaitl dominated the second period of game three with Kane scoring a natural hat-trick, Draisaitl assisting four times, an NHL playoff record, and McDavid assisting three times, leading to an eventual 4–1 victory. In game four, the Flames tied the game after being down by three goals; however Ryan Nugent-Hopkins' second goal broke the tie for Edmonton, scoring with 3:37 left in the game to lead the Oilers to a 5–3 victory and a 3–1 series lead. Game five was mainly a back-and-forth affair, with exception to the two-goal comeback by the Oilers. During the second period, Calgary and Edmonton combined to score four goals in 1:11, setting an NHL record for the fastest four goals in a playoff game. During the third period, Calgary had a late goal by Blake Coleman disallowed after video review determined that the puck was kicked into the net. With the game tied at the end of the third period, both teams headed to overtime where McDavid scored to send Edmonton to the Conference final for the first time since 2006.

May 18	Edmonton Oilers	6–9	Calgary Flames	Scotiabank Saddledome	Recap
Connor McDavid (5) – 07:41		First period	00:26 – Elias Lindholm (4); 00:51 – Andrew Mangiapane (2); 06:05 – Brett Ritchie (1)
Evan Bouchard (1) – 07:10; Zach Hyman (3) – 09:38; Zach Hyman (4) – 14:06; Leon Draisaitl (6) – 19:21		Second period	00:45 – Blake Coleman (1); 06:10 – Blake Coleman (2); 08:24 – pp – Matthew Tkachuk (2)
Kailer Yamamoto (2) – 01:28		Third period	02:57 – Rasmus Andersson (2); 08:55 – Matthew Tkachuk (3); 17:49 – en – Matthew Tkachuk (4)
Mike Smith 7 saves / 10 shots Mikko Koskinen 32 saves / 37 shots		Goalie stats	Jacob Markstrom 22 saves / 28 shots

May 20	Edmonton Oilers	5–3	Calgary Flames	Scotiabank Saddledome	Recap
Duncan Keith (1) – 13:38		First period	03:02 – Michael Stone (2); 06:02 – Brett Ritchie (2)
Connor McDavid (6) – 03:05; Evan Bouchard (2) – pp – 15:03		Second period	02:04 – pp – Tyler Toffoli (2)
Zach Hyman (5) – sh – 10:14; Leon Draisaitl (7) – 12:36		Third period	No scoring
Mike Smith 37 saves / 40 shots		Goalie stats	Jacob Markstrom 35 saves / 40 shots

May 22	Calgary Flames	1–4	Edmonton Oilers	Rogers Place	Recap
No scoring		First period	No scoring
No scoring		Second period	00:52 – Zach Hyman (6); 06:58 – Evander Kane (8); 07:51 – Evander Kane (9); 12:58 – Evander Kane (10)
Oliver Kylington (1) – 15:09		Third period	No scoring
Jacob Markstrom 30 saves / 34 shots Daniel Vladar 7 saves / 7 shots		Goalie stats	Mike Smith 32 saves / 33 shots Mikko Koskinen 0 saves / 0 shots

May 24	Calgary Flames	3–5	Edmonton Oilers	Rogers Place	Recap
No scoring		First period	00:21 – Ryan Nugent-Hopkins (3); 09:53 – pp – Zach Hyman (7); 18:54 – Evander Kane (11)
Elias Lindholm (5) – pp – 09:04; Mikael Backlund (4) – 09:40		Second period	No scoring
Rasmus Andersson (3) – sh – 10:56		Third period	16:33 – Ryan Nugent-Hopkins (4); 19:35 – pp-en – Evander Kane (12)
Jacob Markstrom 21 saves / 25 shots		Goalie stats	Mike Smith 29 saves / 32 shots

May 26	Edmonton Oilers	5–4	OT	Calgary Flames	Scotiabank Saddledome	Recap
No scoring		First period		10:13 – Andrew Mangiapane (3)
Darnell Nurse (2) – 07:40; Jesse Puljujarvi (2) – 09:56; Zach Hyman (8) – pp – 14:57; Evan Bouchard (3) – 16:08		Second period		05:41 – Mikael Backlund (5); 15:12 – Johnny Gaudreau (3); 15:28 – Calle Jarnkrok (1)
No scoring		Third period		No scoring
Connor McDavid (7) – 05:03		First overtime period		No scoring
Mike Smith 32 saves / 36 shots		Goalie stats		Jacob Markstrom 30 saves / 35 shots

Edmonton won series 4–1

== Conference finals ==
=== Eastern Conference final ===
==== (M2) New York Rangers vs. (A3) Tampa Bay Lightning ====
This was the second playoff meeting between these two teams and the third consecutive Eastern Conference Finals to feature Florida vs New York teams. The Rangers made their seventh semifinals/conference final appearance since the league began using a 16-team or greater playoff format in 1980. They lost their most recent appearance in the 2015 Eastern Conference final, also the most recent playoff meeting between these two teams, in seven games to Tampa Bay. This was Tampa Bay's third consecutive and eighth overall semifinals/conference finals since entering the league; they are the first team to accomplish this feat since the 2015 Chicago Blackhawks. They won the previous year's semifinals against the New York Islanders in seven games. New York won all three games in this year's regular season series.

The Lightning defeated the Rangers in six games. Filip Chytil scored twice for the Rangers in game one, who defeated Tampa Bay 6–2. In game two, Igor Shesterkin made 29 saves for the Rangers in a 3–2 affair which ended the Lightning's 18-game win streak after losing the prior game. The Lightning recovered in game three, coming back from a 2–0 deficit, and with Ondrej Palat's goal with 42 seconds left in the game, Tampa Bay defeated New York 3–2. In game four, Palat scored a goal and provided two assists in goalie Andrei Vasilevskiy's 34 save performance to defeat New York 4–1 and tie the series 2–2. Palat continued his late-goal antics into game five, scoring with 1:50 left in the third period to lead the Lightning to a 3–1 victory and a 3–2 series lead. In game six, the captain Steven Stamkos scored twice to give the Lightning a 2–1 victory and a trip to the Stanley Cup Final for the third consecutive season.

June 1	Tampa Bay Lightning	2–6	New York Rangers	Madison Square Garden	Recap
Steven Stamkos (5) – 07:18		First period	01:11 – Chris Kreider (9)
Ondrej Palat (5) – 08:32		Second period	07:50 – Frank Vatrano (4); 10:09 – Filip Chytil (6); 15:43 – Filip Chytil (7)
No scoring		Third period	00:30 – Artemi Panarin (5); 06:06 – pp – Mika Zibanejad (8)
Andrei Vasilevskiy 28 saves / 34 shots		Goalie stats	Igor Shesterkin 37 saves / 39 shots

June 3	Tampa Bay Lightning	2–3	New York Rangers	Madison Square Garden	Recap
Nikita Kucherov (5) – pp – 02:41		First period	05:59 – K'Andre Miller (2); 17:32 – Kaapo Kakko (2)
No scoring		Second period	No scoring
Nick Paul (3) – 17:58		Third period	01:21 – Mika Zibanejad (9)
Andrei Vasilevskiy 25 saves / 28 shots		Goalie stats	Igor Shesterkin 29 saves / 31 shots

June 5	New York Rangers	2–3	Tampa Bay Lightning	Amalie Arena	Recap
No scoring		First period	No scoring
Mika Zibanejad (10) – pp – 07:37; Chris Kreider (10) – pp – 09:44		Second period	10:50 – pp – Nikita Kucherov (6)
No scoring		Third period	01:22 – pp – Steven Stamkos (6); 19:18 – Ondrej Palat (6)
Igor Shesterkin 49 saves / 52 shots		Goalie stats	Andrei Vasilevskiy 28 saves / 30 shots

June 7	New York Rangers	1–4	Tampa Bay Lightning	Amalie Arena	Recap
No scoring		First period	02:38 – Patrick Maroon (3)
No scoring		Second period	13:07 – Nikita Kucherov (7)
Artemi Panarin (6) – pp – 16:27		Third period	04:56 – Steven Stamkos (7); 19:51 – en – Ondrej Palat (7)
Igor Shesterkin 27 saves / 30 shots		Goalie stats	Andrei Vasilevskiy 34 saves / 35 shots

June 9	Tampa Bay Lightning	3–1	New York Rangers	Madison Square Garden	Recap
No scoring		First period	No scoring
Mikhail Sergachev (1) – 17:34		Second period	10:29 – Ryan Lindgren (2)
Ondrej Palat (8) – 18:10; Brandon Hagel (2) – en – 19:01		Third period	No scoring
Andrei Vasilevskiy 24 saves / 25 shots		Goalie stats	Igor Shesterkin 24 saves / 26 shots

June 11	New York Rangers	1–2	Tampa Bay Lightning	Amalie Arena	Recap
No scoring		First period	No scoring
No scoring		Second period	10:43 – Steven Stamkos (8)
Frank Vatrano (5) – pp – 13:07		Third period	13:28 – Steven Stamkos (9)
Igor Shesterkin 29 saves / 31 shots		Goalie stats	Andrei Vasilevskiy 20 saves / 21 shots

Tampa Bay won series 4–2

=== Western Conference final ===
==== (C1) Colorado Avalanche vs. (P2) Edmonton Oilers ====
This was the third playoff meeting between these two teams with the teams splitting the two previous series. They last met in the 1998 Western Conference quarterfinals, which Edmonton came back from a 3–1 series deficit to win in seven games. This was Colorado's ninth appearance in the Conference Final. They were defeated in seven games by the Detroit Red Wings in their most recent conference finals appearance in 2002. Edmonton made their tenth appearance in the conference finals. Their most recent appearance was in the 2006 Western Conference final, which Edmonton won against the Mighty Ducks of Anaheim in five games. Colorado won two of the three games in this year's regular season series.

The Avalanche defeated the Oilers in a four-game sweep. In game one, the Avalanche held off a potential four-goal comeback with an empty net goal to win 8–6. During the game, Cale Makar's goal appeared to be offside due to Valeri Nichushkin still needing to exit the offensive zone, however, the goal was deemed onside with Makar pushing the puck across the blue line and not in possession until Nichushkin became onside. Pavel Francouz stopped all 24 shots he faced in game two and with Nazem Kadri's three assists, Colorado won 4–0. In game three, Nichushkin's two goals helped Colorado obtain a 4–2 victory and a 3–0 series lead. In game four, the Avalanche came back from a two-goal deficit to take the lead, but the Oilers tied the game and it went to overtime. In overtime, Artturi Lehkonen scored to send Colorado to the Finals for the first time since 2001.

May 31	Edmonton Oilers	6–8	Colorado Avalanche	Ball Arena	Recap
Evander Kane (13) – 05:04; Zach Hyman (9) – 19:37		First period	05:40 – J. T. Compher (3); 15:10 – Nathan MacKinnon (9); 19:46 – Cale Makar (4)
Ryan McLeod (2) – 02:59; Connor McDavid (8) – 16:51		Second period	00:32 – pp – Nazem Kadri (6); 04:38 – Mikko Rantanen (2); 06:20 – J. T. Compher (4); 16:20 – Andrew Cogliano (2)
Derek Ryan (1) – 03:28; Ryan Nugent-Hopkins (5) – pp – 12:36		Third period	19:38 – en – Gabriel Landeskog (7)
Mike Smith 19 saves / 25 shots Mikko Koskinen 20 saves / 21 shots		Goalie stats	Darcy Kuemper 13 saves / 16 shots Pavel Francouz 18 saves / 21 shots

June 2	Edmonton Oilers	0–4	Colorado Avalanche	Ball Arena	Recap
No scoring		First period	No scoring
No scoring		Second period	03:58 – Artturi Lehkonen (5); 04:13 – Josh Manson (2); 06:02 – Mikko Rantanen (3)
No scoring		Third period	15:20 – pp – Nathan MacKinnon (10)
Mike Smith 36 saves / 40 shots		Goalie stats	Pavel Francouz 24 saves / 24 shots

June 4	Colorado Avalanche	4–2	Edmonton Oilers	Rogers Place	Recap
Valeri Nichushkin (4) – 16:12		First period	00:38 – Connor McDavid (9)
Valeri Nichushkin (5) – 04:37		Second period	No scoring
J. T. Compher (5) – 12:42; Mikko Rantanen (4) – en – 19:30		Third period	07:34 – Ryan McLeod (3)
Pavel Francouz 27 saves / 29 shots		Goalie stats	Mike Smith 39 saves / 42 shots

June 6	Colorado Avalanche	6–5	OT	Edmonton Oilers	Rogers Place	Recap
Cale Makar (5) – pp – 03:46		First period		No scoring
No scoring		Second period		07:39 – Zach Hyman (10); 16:57 – Ryan Nugent-Hopkins (6); 18:54 – pp – Connor McDavid (10)
Devon Toews (5) – 00:31; Gabriel Landeskog (8) – 08:58; Nathan MacKinnon (11) – 13:30; Mikko Rantanen (5) – pp – 14:47		Third period		03:55 – Zach Hyman (11); 16:38 – Zack Kassian (2)
Artturi Lehkonen (6) – 01:19		First overtime period		No scoring
Pavel Francouz 30 saves / 35 shots		Goalie stats		Mike Smith 36 saves / 42 shots

Colorado won series 4–0

== Stanley Cup Final ==
This was the first playoff meeting between these two teams. Colorado made their third Finals appearance. They last appeared in the Finals in 2001, which Colorado won against the New Jersey Devils in seven games. This was Tampa Bay's third consecutive Finals appearance and fifth overall; they were the first team to appear in three consecutive Finals since the 1985 Edmonton Oilers. They won the previous year's finals against the Montreal Canadiens in five games. Colorado won both games in this year's regular season series.

June 15	Tampa Bay Lightning	3–4	OT	Colorado Avalanche	Ball Arena	Recap
Nick Paul (4) 12:26		First period		07:47 – Gabriel Landeskog (9); 09:23 – Valeri Nichushkin (6); 17:31 – pp – Artturi Lehkonen (7)
Ondrej Palat (9) – 12:51; Mikhail Sergachev (2) – 13:39		Second period		No scoring
No scoring		Third period		No scoring
No scoring		First overtime period		01:23 – Andre Burakovsky (2)
Andrei Vasilevskiy 34 saves / 38 shots		Goalie stats		Darcy Kuemper 20 saves / 23 shots

June 18	Tampa Bay Lightning	0–7	Colorado Avalanche	Ball Arena	Recap
No scoring		First period	02:54 – pp – Valeri Nichushkin (7); 07:55 – Josh Manson (3); 13:52 – Andre Burakovsky (3)
No scoring		Second period	04:51 – Valeri Nichushkin (8); 16:26 – Darren Helm (2)
No scoring		Third period	02:04 – sh – Cale Makar (6); 09:49 – pp – Cale Makar (7)
Andrei Vasilevskiy 23 saves / 30 shots		Goalie stats	Darcy Kuemper 16 saves / 16 shots

June 20	Colorado Avalanche	2–6	Tampa Bay Lightning	Amalie Arena	Recap
Gabriel Landeskog (10) – pp – 08:19		First period	13:03 – Anthony Cirelli (2); 14:54 – Ondrej Palat (10)
Gabriel Landeskog (11) – pp – 04:43		Second period	01:26 – Nick Paul (5); 07:52 – Steven Stamkos (10); 11:15 – Patrick Maroon (4); 14:58 – pp – Corey Perry (6)
No scoring		Third period	No scoring
Darcy Kuemper 17 saves / 22 shots Pavel Francouz 10 saves / 11 shots		Goalie stats	Andrei Vasilevskiy 37 saves / 39 shots

June 22	Colorado Avalanche	3–2	OT	Tampa Bay Lightning	Amalie Arena	Recap
No scoring		First period		00:36 – Anthony Cirelli (3)
Nathan MacKinnon (12) – pp – 05:17		Second period		10:42 – Victor Hedman (3)
Andrew Cogliano (3) – 02:53		Third period		No scoring
Nazem Kadri (7) – 12:02		First overtime period		No scoring
Darcy Kuemper 37 saves / 39 shots		Goalie stats		Andrei Vasilevskiy 34 saves / 37 shots

June 24	Tampa Bay Lightning	3–2	Colorado Avalanche	Ball Arena	Recap
Jan Rutta (1) – 15:23		First period	No scoring
Nikita Kucherov (8) – pp – 08:10		Second period	05:07 – Valeri Nichushkin (9)
Ondrej Palat (11) – 13:38		Third period	02:31 – Cale Makar (8)
Andrei Vasilevskiy 35 saves / 37 shots		Goalie stats	Darcy Kuemper 26 saves / 29 shots

June 26	Colorado Avalanche	2–1	Tampa Bay Lightning	Amalie Arena	Recap
No scoring		First period	03:48 – Steven Stamkos (11)
Nathan MacKinnon (13) – 01:54; Artturi Lehkonen (8) – 12:28		Second period	No scoring
No scoring		Third period	No scoring
Darcy Kuemper 22 saves / 23 shots		Goalie stats	Andrei Vasilevskiy 28 saves / 30 shots

Colorado won series 4–2

== Player statistics ==
=== Skaters ===
These are the top ten skaters based on points, following the conclusion of the playoffs.

Player	Team	GP	G	A	Pts	+/–	PIM
Connor McDavid	Edmonton Oilers	16	10	23	33	+15	10
Leon Draisaitl	Edmonton Oilers	16	7	25	32	+4	6
Cale Makar	Colorado Avalanche	20	8	21	29	+7	10
Nikita Kucherov	Tampa Bay Lightning	23	8	19	27	+7	14
Mikko Rantanen	Colorado Avalanche	20	5	20	25	+3	4
Nathan MacKinnon	Colorado Avalanche	20	13	11	24	+11	8
Mika Zibanejad	New York Rangers	20	10	14	24	0	4
Adam Fox	New York Rangers	20	5	18	23	0	2
Gabriel Landeskog	Colorado Avalanche	20	11	11	22	+15	6
Ondrej Palat	Tampa Bay Lightning	23	11	10	21	+10	10

=== Goaltenders ===
This is a combined table of the top five goaltenders based on goals against average and the top five goaltenders based on save percentage, with at least 420 minutes played. The table is sorted by GAA, and the criteria for inclusion are bolded.

Player	Team	GP	W	L	SA	GA	GAA	SV%	SO	TOI
Jake Oettinger	Dallas Stars	7	3	4	285	13	**1.81**	**.954**	1	429:49
Antti Raanta	Carolina Hurricanes	13	6	5	322	25	**2.26**	**.922**	1	663:25
Andrei Vasilevskiy	Tampa Bay Lightning	23	14	9	752	59	**2.52**	**.922**	1	1,402:42
Darcy Kuemper	Colorado Avalanche	16	10	4	386	38	**2.57**	.902	1	886:53
Igor Shesterkin	New York Rangers	20	10	9	719	51	**2.59**	**.929**	0	1,181:24
Mike Smith	Edmonton Oilers	16	8	6	560	49	3.37	**.913**	2	872:15

== Media ==
=== Canada ===
In Canada, this marked the eighth postseason under Rogers Media's 12-year contract. Games aired across Sportsnet, SN1, SN360, and CBC under the Hockey Night in Canada brand. For first and second round U.S. vs. U.S. games not on CBC, Sportsnet generally simulcasted the U.S. feed instead of producing their own telecast. Games were streamed live on Sportsnet Now, CBCSports.ca (for games televised by CBC), or the subscription service NHL Live.

=== United States ===
In the U.S., this marked the first Stanley Cup playoffs under the NHL's seven-year broadcast rights deals with ESPN and TNT. During the first round, games aired across ESPN, ESPN2, TBS, and TNT. For the second round onward, the games aired on either ESPN or TNT (except for one second-round game which aired on ESPN2 due to Sunday Night Baseball airing on ESPN). Other ESPN and Turner channels (such as ESPNU, ESPNews, and TruTV) were used in the event of overflow situations. As before, each U.S. team's regional broadcaster televised local coverage of games during the first round, after which all other games were exclusive to the ESPN networks and TNT.

In assigning broadcasters for each game, the NHL had to work around the 2022 NBA playoffs (which shared ESPN and TNT as rightsholders, and started ahead of the Stanley Cup playoffs), ESPN's Sunday Night Baseball, and other such conflicts. In general, the first round was roughly split between ESPN/ESPN2 and TNT/TBS, ensuring that both broadcasters televised two of the first four games in each series, and at least two of the five game seven's. With the NBA Conference finals occurring at the same time with the Stanley Cup second round this year, ESPN ended up being the de facto exclusive broadcaster for the Carolina–NY Rangers and Calgary–Edmonton series, and TNT doing the same for the Florida–Tampa Bay and Colorado–St. Louis series. Both conference finals also aired exclusively on ESPN and TNT; under the new contracts, ESPN held the first choice of which conference final to air, opting for the Eastern Conference this postseason. As per the new alternating rotation, ABC exclusively aired the Stanley Cup Final.

Unlike past seasons, there was no coverage of playoff games on U.S. broadcast television until the Stanley Cup Final (previous rightsholders such as NBC had traditionally offered weekend games on broadcast television during the early rounds), as ESPN had prioritized the carriage of NBA playoff games on broadcast television via ABC instead. Conversely, the Finals were carried in their entirety on broadcast television for the first time since 1980 (which was aired primarily by the Hughes Television Network, but with CBS acquiring the rights to the series-deciding game six as a one-off CBS Sports Spectacular broadcast); Since then, the Finals were either partially or exclusively carried on cable. There were no live games on over-the-top streaming services until the third round, as ESPN+ only streamed simulcasts of the Eastern Conference finals and Stanley Cup Final, and Turner Sports did not invoke its option to carry or simulcast games on HBO Max.

American national radio rights to select Stanley Cup playoff games, including the entire conference finals and Stanley Cup Final, were broadcast on the Sports USA Radio Network via NHL Radio. This was the first of a four-year deal signed between the NHL and Sports USA to syndicate NHL games on U.S. national radio.

Preceded by 2021 Stanley Cup playoffs	Stanley Cup playoffs 2022	Succeeded by 2023 Stanley Cup playoffs
