= Frank Vatrano =

American ice hockey player (born 1994)

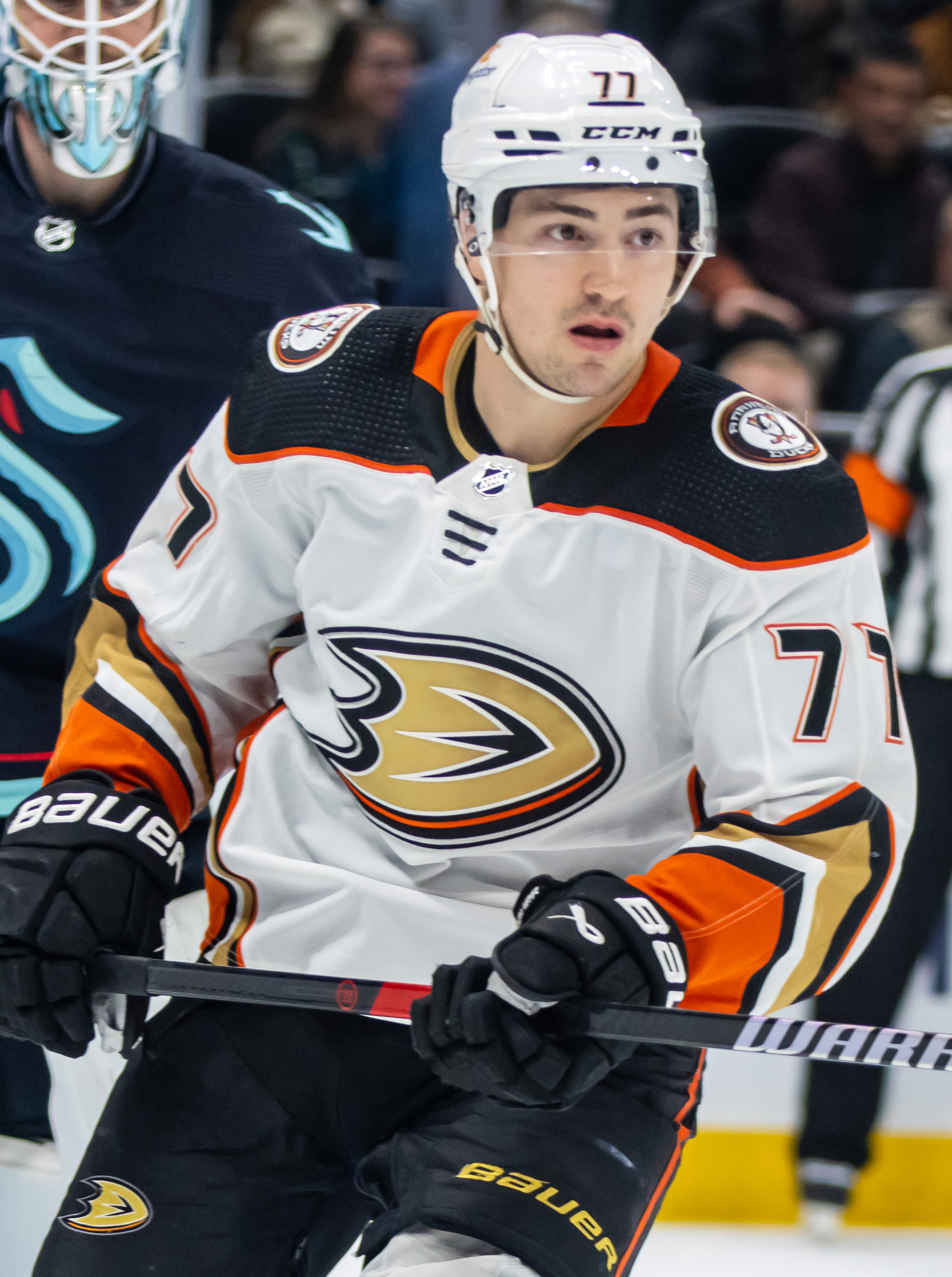
- Vatrano with the Anaheim Ducks in 2023
- Born: March 14, 1994 (age 32) Springfield, Massachusetts, U.S.
- Height: 5 ft 11 in (180 cm)
- Weight: 203 lb (92 kg; 14 st 7 lb)
- Position: Right wing
- Shoots: Left
- NHL team Former teams: Anaheim Ducks; Boston Bruins; Florida Panthers; New York Rangers
- National team: United States
- NHL draft: Undrafted
- Playing career: 2014–present

Frank Vatrano (born March 14, 1994) is an American professional ice hockey player who is a right winger for the Anaheim Ducks of the National Hockey League (NHL). He has previously played for the Boston Bruins, Florida Panthers, and New York Rangers.

== Playing career ==
=== Amateur ===
Vatrano grew up in East Longmeadow, Massachusetts. As a youth, he played in the 2006 Quebec International Pee-Wee Hockey Tournament with the Minuteman Flames minor ice hockey team. He attended Cathedral High School, and later transferred to Pioneer High School in Ann Arbor, Michigan to play in the U.S. National Team Development Program. He played for the Boston Jr. Bruins in 2009–10 appearing in eight games recording two points before playing within the U.S. National Development Team Program. After originally committing to Boston College to play National Collegiate Athletic Association (NCAA) Division I college ice hockey during high school, he was considered ineligible to play for them three days after joining the program due to academic scores.

Vatrano returned to the Boston Jr. Bruins while appealing the decision. He started his collegiate career the following season with the UMass Minutemen of the Hockey East conference. In his first season with UMass in 2013–14, he made just one appearance, debuting against the University of Vermont Catamounts in the 2014 Hockey East Tournament. In his sophomore season in 2014–15 with the Minutemen, Vatrano played in all 36 games, recording 18 goals and 10 assists for 28 points. However, UMass was knocked out of the 2015 Hockey East Tournament by the Notre Dame Fighting Irish, ending his college career.

=== Professional ===
==== Boston Bruins ====
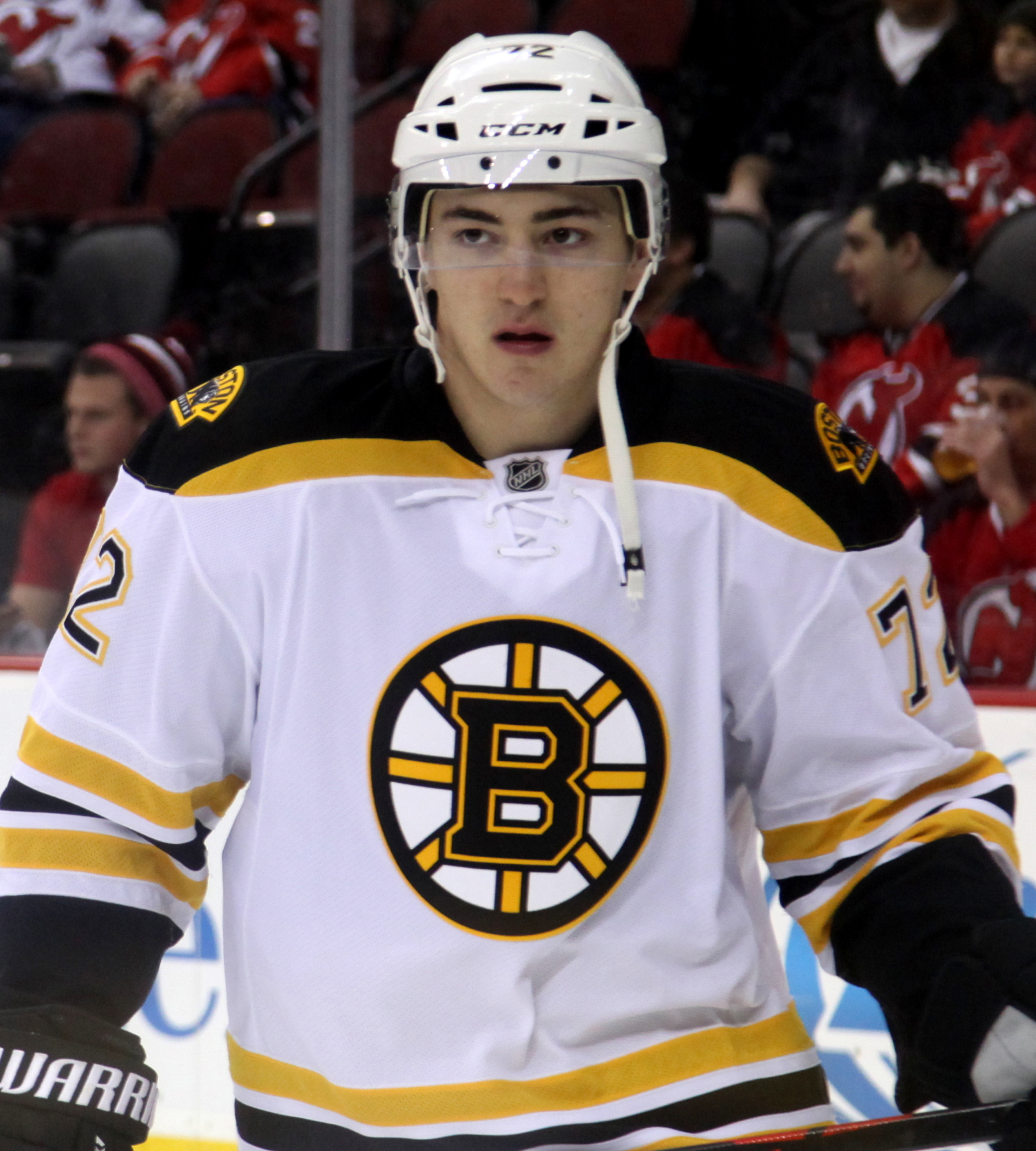
Vatrano with the Boston Bruins in 2016

Undrafted by teams in the National Hockey League (NHL), Vatrano forwent his senior year of college in 2014 to pursue a professional career, signing a three-year entry-level contract with the Boston Bruins on March 12, 2015. He signed an amateur tryout contract with Boston's American Hockey League (AHL) affiliate, the Providence Bruins, making his professional debut to finish out the 2014–15 season. He appeared in five games, scoring one goal.

After attending his first Bruins training camp, Vatrano was reassigned to the Providence Bruins to begin his rookie season. Vatrano opened the 2015–16 season, leading the AHL in goal scoring with ten goals in as many games, earning rookie of the month honors. His quick ascension was realized when he subsequently received his first NHL recall with the Bruins on November 6. On November 7, Vatrano made his NHL debut, and scored his first regular season NHL goal against Mike Condon of the Bruins' long-time rivals, the Montreal Canadiens, in a 4–2 road game defeat. Vatrano scored two goals for his first multi-goal NHL game on November 25 against the Detroit Red Wings, including the overtime game winner. On December 18, Vatrano scored his first NHL hat trick with the Bruins against the Pittsburgh Penguins, with the first, fifth, and sixth Bruins goals for a 6–2 road victory. He was returned to Providence on January 21, 2016. He was recalled again by Boston on March 14 after leading the AHL in scoring. Despite being with Boston for half the month, he still earned AHL Rookie of the Month honors for the March. He finished the season with Boston, scoring eight goals and 11 points in 39 games. At the end of the 2015–16 AHL season, he finished with 36 goals and 19 assists for a total of 55 points in 36 games. He also had three hat tricks. On April 14, 2016, the AHL announced that Vatrano and San Antonio Rampage rookie Mikko Rantanen shared the Dudley "Red" Garrett Memorial Award as the AHL's outstanding rookie for the 2015–16 season. He also won the Willie Marshall Award for the league's leading goal scorer and was named to the AHL's First All-Star and All-Rookie teams. Vatrano was returned to the AHL for the 2016 Calder Cup playoffs as the Providence Bruins faced the Wilkes-Barre/Scranton Penguins in the first round. He scored one goal in the three games of the series as the Bruins were eliminated.

Prior to the start of the 2016–17 Boston Bruins season, Vatrano had suffered an unexpected injury to his left foot due to torn ligaments that required surgery to repair. As a result, Vatrano missed the Bruins' training camp and the first months of the season recovering. After being cleared to play in mid-December, he was assigned to Providence and scored in his first game back in the AHL. After playing in a second game with Providence he was recalled and returned to Boston's lineup on December 22, on the road against the Florida Panthers. With 2:09 elapsed in the second period, Vatrano scored the first Bruins goal en route to a 3–1 victory. He registered a three-point game on February 11, 2017 against the Vancouver Canucks, scoring one goal and adding two assists in the 4–3 win. He missed four games in late March/early April due to an upper body injury. He played in 44 regular season games with Boston, scoring ten goals and 18 points. The Bruins made the 2017 Stanley Cup playoffs and faced the Ottawa Senators in the first round. In his NHL postseason debut, he scored the game winning goal in Game 1 in a 2–1 victory on April 12, snapping a 16-game goalless drought. However, the Bruins were eliminated in six games. In the series, Vatrano scored the one goal in six games.

Vatrano began the 2017–18 season with Boston, and was among the young forwards on the team expected to add supporting offense to the Bruins' star players. However, he was often placed in the bottom two lines and used more in an energy role and rarely used on the power play. After appearing in the Bruins first nine games and going pointless, Vatrano was a healthy scratch for the next two. He returned to the lineup on November 6, scoring his first goal of the season in a 5–3 win over the Minnesota Wild. He then saw increased time as a healthy scratch due to roster regulations in which he could be lost on waivers that prevented him from being assigned to the AHL. From December 21 until January 25, 2018, Vatrano was left out of the lineup, only returning due to an injury to Noel Acciari. He played in 25 games with the Bruins, scoring just two goals.

==== Florida Panthers ====
On February 22, 2018, the Bruins traded Vatrano to the Florida Panthers in exchange for a third-round pick in the 2018 NHL entry draft. Immediately following the trade, it was revealed that Vatrano was expected to miss two weeks to recover from an ankle injury. He scored in his debut with the Panthers on March 10, ending his 13-game goalless drought, to help the team record their eighth straight home win. Vatrano's outstanding play earned him a temporary promotion from the third line to the second line to play with Vincent Trocheck and Jonathan Huberdeau. Despite his efforts, the Panthers were eliminated from playoff contention with a 43–30–8 record on April 7. He finished with five goals and eight points in 16 games with Florida. Following the Panthers' elimination, Vatrano signed a one-year contract to remain with the team on June 29.

For 2018–19, Vatrano entered the season as their expected third line winger alongside center Jared McCann and winger Denis Malgin. The line had played together shortly during the previous season but never for long amounts of time. Malgin was eventually replaced with Jonathan Huberdeau. By January 15, 2019, Vatrano reached new career-highs in goals and points while averaging 14:11 of ice time per game. His 12 even-strength goals were also tied for the team lead. His play earned him a promotion to the Panthers' top line as a winger to Aleksander Barkov and Evgenii Dadonov. Upon joining this line, he accumulated three goals and three assists in four games. He also set a new NHL career high with four points in one game as the Panthers beat the San Jose Sharks 6–2 on January 21. In his following ten games on that line, Vatrano led the team in goals, points, and shots on goal while also pacing all team forwards with 44 blocked shots. He continued to lead the team in scoring throughout February with an NHL career-high 20 goals and 33 points through 59 games. Vatrano's outstanding play earned him a three-year contract extension on February 25. Once Malgin returned to the lineup on March 25, Vatrano reunited with the center and Riley Sheahan on the third line. The following game, Vatrano tallied his 23rd goal of the season, continue adding to his new-career high, in his 200th career NHL game. He concluded his second season with the team with 24 goals and 15 assists for 39 points in 81 games.

In his third season with the Panthers in 2019–20, Vatrano established himself as a scoring winger. He recorded his second career hat trick on January 21, 2020 against the Chicago Blackhawks in a 4–3 win. This extended a five-game point streak in which he scored five goals and four assists. However, despite being on pace to break his personal bests in goals and points he did not, reaching 16 goals and 34 points before the NHL suspended the season due to the COVID-19 pandemic on March 12. When play resumed for the 2020 Stanley Cup playoffs, the Panthers faced the New York Islanders in the qualifying round. Ahead of the playoffs, Panthers coach Joel Quenneville chose to place Vatrano back on the first line with Barkov, with whom he regularly played with on the penalty kill unit. However, that lasted one game, as Quenneville moved him down to third-line left wing for Game 2 alongside Brian Boyle and Brett Connolly. He played in just the two games, going scoreless, as the Islanders eliminated the Panthers in four.

Entering the pandemic-delayed and shortened 2020–21 season, Vatrano had become more of a complete player, regularly appearing on the penalty kill and second power play units. In April 2021, he went on a goal scoring tear, recording seven goals in ten games. He finished the season with 18 goals and 26 points in 56 games. The Panthers made the 2021 Stanley Cup playoffs and faced their cross-state rivals, the Tampa Bay Lightning in the first round. In their best-of-seven series, the Lightning eliminated the Panthers in six games, and Vatrano notched one goal and an assist.

In the final season of his three-year contract in 2021–22, Vatrano was considered one of the key depth scorers for the Panthers team. On November 20, he scored two goals and added an assist for a three-point night against the Minnesota Wild. In December, he was placed in COVID-19 protocol alongside Aaron Ekblad. Despite the Panthers having the best season in franchise history, Vatrano could not say the same. In his first 40 games, he put up on 14 points which led to him being a healthy scratch several times. He appeared in 56 games with the Panthers, scoring 18 goals and 26 points.

==== New York Rangers ====
On March 16, 2022, Vatrano was traded by the Panthers to the New York Rangers in exchange for a conditional 2022 fourth-round draft pick in an effort to clear cap space to acquire another defenseman. (Note: The 2022 fourth-round draft pick was the later of the two fourth-round draft picks that the Rangers controlled. The Rangers had at the time, the Winnipeg Jets pick and their own.) The Rangers on the other hand, acquired a player who could improve their bottom six forwards and could score. He made his Rangers' debut on March 17 in a 2–1 loss to the New York Islanders, playing on a line with Ryan Strome and Artemi Panarin. He immediately found chemistry with the Rangers, playing alongside former junior teammates Jacob Trouba and Andrew Copp. He scored his first goal with the team on March 20, in a 2–0 shutout win over the Carolina Hurricanes. He finished the season notching 8 goals and 13 points through 22 appearances with the Rangers. In the 2022 Stanley Cup playoffs, he helped the Rangers advance to the Eastern Conference Finals, losing to the Tampa Bay Lightning, contributing with 5 goals and 13 points through 20 post-season games.

==== Anaheim Ducks ====
As a free agent from the Rangers, Vatrano was signed to a three-year, $10.95 million contract with the Anaheim Ducks on July 13, 2022. In his first season with Anaheim, Vatrano scored 22 goals, the second highest total of his career to that point and led the team in shots on goal. He scored 16 of those goals in the second half of the season.

Vatrano started the 2023–24 season with a bang, scoring a hat trick in the second game of the season against the Carolina Hurricanes on October 15, 2023. It was the fourth hat trick of his career. Only 13 days later, Vatrano would score his fifth career hat trick in a game against the Philadelphia Flyers. In the midst of his career year, Vatrano was named an NHL All-Star on January 4, 2024. He was drafted by Team Hughes for the game, and recorded two goals and an assist in the 6–5 shootout loss to Team Matthews in the semi-final. He scored his third hat trick of the season on the final day, in a 4–1 victory over the Vegas Golden Knights on April 18. He finished the season leading the team in goals with 37 and points with 60.

Entering the final year of his contract, general manager Pat Verbeek resisted attempts by other teams to acquire Vatrano in the offseason. On December 1, he recorded a two-goal, three-point game in a 4–3 victory over the Ottawa Senators. On December 18, he repeated that performance in a 3–2 win over the Winnipeg Jets, scoring the game-tying goal and assisted on the winning goal in the third period. On January 5, 2025, it was announced that Vatrano had signed a three-year, $18 million extension to stay in Anaheim; unusually for the NHL, half of the contract is in deferred salary with payments beginning in 2035, which lowered the annual salary cap hit. That night, he recorded another three-point effort, scoring two goals and an assist in a 4–1 win over the Tampa Bay Lightning.

== International play ==
In 2011, Vatrano was among the players selected to play for the United States' under-17 team at the World U-17 Hockey Challenge. The team won silver. The next year he rejoined Team USA to play in the IIHF World U18 Championship, in which the team won gold.

Vatrano joined the Team USA for the 2016 IIHF World Championship. Team USA advanced to the bronze medal game against Russia, but ultimately lost 6–2 to finish fourth. However, Vatrano scored both of those goals for Team USA. He returned to the team for the 2019 IIHF World Championship. The United States were eliminated again by Russia in the quarterfinals of the tournament.

== Career statistics ==
=== Regular season and playoffs ===
			Regular season					Playoffs
Season	Team	League	GP	G	A	Pts	PIM	GP	G	A	Pts	PIM
2007–08	Boston Jr. Bruins	EJHL	2	1	0	1	0	—	—	—	—	—
2008–09	Boston Jr. Bruins	EJHL	44	25	26	51	30	7	3	2	5	2
2009–10	Boston Jr. Bruins	EJHL	8	0	2	2	2	—	—	—	—	—
2010–11	U.S. NTDP Juniors	USHL	34	11	4	15	22	2	1	0	1	0
2010–11	U.S. NTDP U17	USDP	53	19	11	30	50	—	—	—	—	—
2011–12	U.S. NTDP Juniors	USHL	24	7	11	18	8	—	—	—	—	—
2011–12	U.S. NTDP U18	USDP	60	16	19	35	24	—	—	—	—	—
2012–13	U.S. NTDP Juniors	USHL	1	0	1	1	2	—	—	—	—	—
2012–13	U.S. NTDP U18	USDP	5	0	4	4	21	—	—	—	—	—
2012–13	Boston Jr. Bruins	EJHL	19	13	9	22	20	—	—	—	—	—
2013–14	UMass Minutemen	HE	1	0	0	0	0	—	—	—	—	—
2014–15	UMass Minutemen	HE	36	18	10	28	28	—	—	—	—	—
2014–15	Providence Bruins	AHL	5	1	0	1	0	—	—	—	—	—
2015–16	Providence Bruins	AHL	36	36	19	55	22	3	1	0	1	2
2015–16	Boston Bruins	NHL	39	8	3	11	14	—	—	—	—	—
2016–17	Providence Bruins	AHL	2	2	0	2	4	—	—	—	—	—
2016–17	Boston Bruins	NHL	44	10	8	18	14	6	1	0	1	4
2017–18	Boston Bruins	NHL	25	2	0	2	22	—	—	—	—	—
2017–18	Florida Panthers	NHL	16	5	3	8	12	—	—	—	—	—
2018–19	Florida Panthers	NHL	81	24	15	39	38	—	—	—	—	—
2019–20	Florida Panthers	NHL	69	16	18	34	30	2	0	0	0	2
2020–21	Florida Panthers	NHL	56	18	8	26	26	6	1	1	2	4
2021–22	Florida Panthers	NHL	49	10	9	19	30	—	—	—	—	—
2021–22	New York Rangers	NHL	22	8	5	13	6	20	5	8	13	13
2022–23	Anaheim Ducks	NHL	81	22	19	41	66	—	—	—	—	—
2023–24	Anaheim Ducks	NHL	82	37	23	60	85	—	—	—	—	—
2024–25	Anaheim Ducks	NHL	81	21	24	45	80	—	—	—	—	—
2025–26	Anaheim Ducks	NHL	50	5	4	9	40	—	—	—	—	—
NHL totals			695	186	139	325	449	34	7	9	16	23

=== International ===
Year	Team	Event	Result	GP	G	A	Pts	PIM
2011	United States	U17	2nd place, silver medalist(s)	5	2	2	4	4
2012	United States	U18	1st place, gold medalist(s)	6	2	2	4	2
2016	United States	WC	4th	10	3	5	8	12
2019	United States	WC	7th	8	2	1	3	4
Junior totals				11	4	4	8	6
Senior totals				18	5	6	11	16

== Awards and honors ==
Award	Year	Ref
AHL
AHL Rookie of the Month	October 2015; March 2016	
AHL All-Rookie Team	2016	
AHL First All-Star Team	2016	
Willie Marshall Award	2016	
Dudley "Red" Garrett Memorial Award	2016	
NHL
NHL All-Star Game	2024	

== Sources ==
- Chaimovitch, Jason, ed. (2024). 2024–2025 American Hockey League Official Guide & Record Book. Springfield, Massachusetts: American Hockey League. OCLC 22147888.

Awards and achievements
Preceded by Matt Murray	AHL Rookie of the Year; 2015–16 (with Mikko Rantanen)	Succeeded by Danny O'Regan
