= Ville Husso =

Finnish ice hockey player (born 1995)

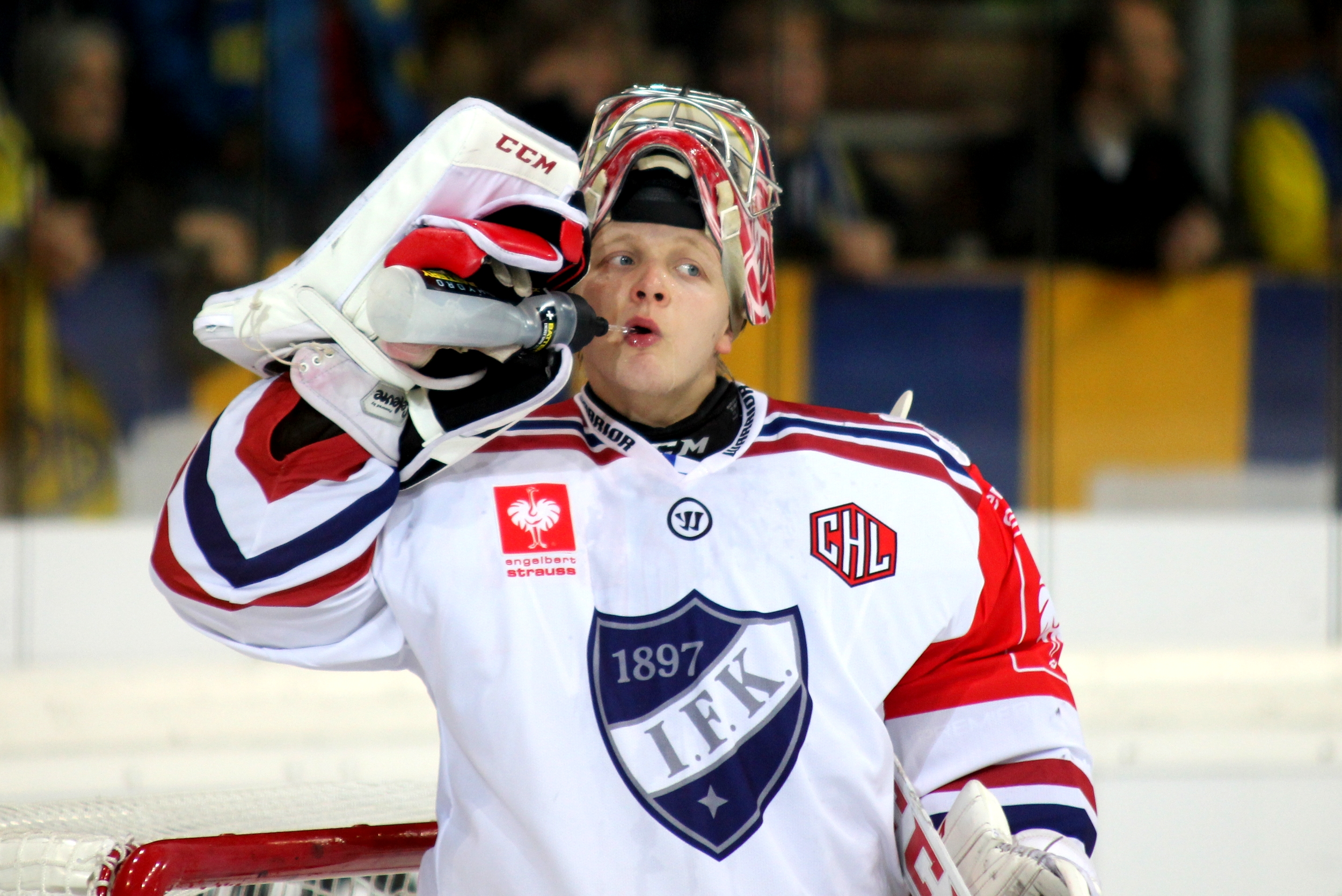
- Husso with HIFK in 2015
- Born: 6 February 1995 (age 31) Helsinki, Finland
- Height: 6 ft 3 in (191 cm)
- Weight: 205 lb (93 kg; 14 st 9 lb)
- Position: Goaltender
- Catches: Left
- NHL team Former teams: Anaheim Ducks; HIFK; St. Louis Blues; Detroit Red Wings
- National team: Finland
- NHL draft: 94th overall, 2014; St. Louis Blues
- Playing career: 2013–present

Ville Husso (born 6 February 1995) is a Finnish professional ice hockey player who is a goaltender for the Anaheim Ducks of the National Hockey League (NHL).

== Playing career ==
Husso started his career in the youth setup at HIFK in his hometown of Helsinki. He made his debut with the club's men's team during the 2013–14 Liiga season. He reached the Liiga finals with HIFK in the 2015–16 season, where they fell short to Tappara. Husso excelled with a save percentage (SVS%) of .927 and a goals against average (GAA) of 1.91 that season, while receiving the Urpo Ylönen Award as the Goaltender of the Year. He also competed in the Champions Hockey League with HIFK.

=== St. Louis Blues ===
On 10 May 2016, he signed a three-year, entry-level contract with the St. Louis Blues of the National Hockey League (NHL). After attending the Blues' 2016 training camp, he was assigned to American Hockey League (AHL) affiliate, the Chicago Wolves, on 29 September.

Husso made his North American debut with the Wolves against the Grand Rapids Griffins on 15 October, to begin the 2016–17 season. It was the first of two games he started in with AHL's Chicago Wolves. Through the two games, he posted a SV% of .914 and a GAA of 2.53. He was reassigned to the Missouri Mavericks of the ECHL on 26 October. Husso thrived in net for the Mavericks, where he was fifth on the St. Louis Blues' organizational goaltender depth chart. On 23 December, Husso earned his first professional shutout with 33 saves in a 4–0 victory over the Wichita Thunder. Husso returned to the Chicago Wolves in late December 2016, where he had continued success, posting a SV% of .925 and GAA of 2.21 through five games played for the Wolves.

On 20 July 2019, the Blues re-signed Husso to a one-year, two-way contract extension.

In the pandemic-shortened 2020–21 season, on 31 January 2021, Husso recorded his first win in the NHL, in a 4–1 game over the Anaheim Ducks. On 12 May, Husso recorded his first NHL shutout in a 4–0 win over the Minnesota Wild. The 2021–22 season was a breakout for Husso, who began it as the backup goaltender to Jordan Binnington, but then saw his role expand as Binnington struggled. By the end of the regular season he had taken over the starting position, which in turn raised questions about the future of the team's goaltending, as Binnington was signed to a lengthy and expensive contract, while Husso was to become a free agent. He finished the regular season with a 25–7–6 record and a .919 SV%. The Blues qualified for the 2022 Stanley Cup playoffs, entering the first round as underdogs against the Minnesota Wild, with Husso starting in net. However, Husso did not perform well in the early games, and with the Blues down 2–1 in the series, Binnington reclaimed the net and led the team on a three-game winning streak to clinch the series. Husso served as backup until Binnington was injured during the second round series against the Colorado Avalanche, at which point he reclaimed the net. The Blues were defeated by the Avalanche in six games, while Husso recorded a .890 SV% in the postseason.

=== Detroit Red Wings ===
On 8 July 2022, Husso was traded at the 2022 NHL entry draft to the Detroit Red Wings in exchange for a third-round draft pick. He was immediately signed by the Red Wings to a three-year, $14.25 million contract. Husso made 29 saves in his regular season debut with Detroit on 14 October, earning a shutout in a 3–0 victory over the Montreal Canadiens.

=== Anaheim Ducks ===
In the midst of his final season under contract with the Red Wings in 2024–25 and having split the season between the Red Wings and AHL affiliate, the Grand Rapids Griffins, Husso was traded by Detroit to the Anaheim Ducks in exchange for future considerations on 25 February 2025. He was directly assigned to remain in the AHL and report to affiliate, the San Diego Gulls.

== International play ==
Medal record

Men's ice hockey

Representing Finland

World Junior Championships
Gold medal – first place	2014 Malmö	

Husso was a member gold-winning of Finland junior team at the 2014 World Junior Championships, serving as a backup to Juuse Saros. He made two appearances in the tournament.

== Career statistics ==
=== Regular season and playoffs ===
			Regular season									Playoffs
Season	Team	League	GP	W	L	OT	MIN	GA	SO	GAA	SV%	GP	W	L	MIN	GA	SO	GAA	SV%
2011–12	HIFK	Jr. A	27	15	11	0	1618	65	3	2.41	.913	10	9	1	604	18	0	1.79	.933
2012–13	HIFK	Jr. A	41	24	17	0	2459	108	7	2.63	.909	5	2	3	322	12	0	2.23	.926
2013–14	HIFK	Liiga	41	19	14	5	2355	78	2	1.99	.923	2	0	2	144	3	0	1.25	.935
2013–14	HCK	Mestis	6	—	—	—	364	13	0	2.14	.937	—	—	—	—	—	—	—	—
2014–15	HIFK	Liiga	41	16	11	10	2338	92	3	2.36	.915	3	1	2	159	6	0	2.27	.897
2015–16	HIFK	Liiga	39	25	8	6	2328	74	5	1.91	.927	15	9	6	889	23	4	1.55	.935
2016–17	Chicago Wolves	AHL	22	13	6	2	1267	50	1	2.37	.920	10	4	6	535	30	0	3.36	.898
2016–17	Missouri Mavericks	ECHL	13	4	4	3	688	37	1	3.23	.910	—	—	—	—	—	—	—	—
2017–18	San Antonio Rampage	AHL	38	15	14	5	2130	86	4	2.42	.922	—	—	—	—	—	—	—	—
2018–19	San Antonio Rampage	AHL	27	6	17	1	1421	87	1	3.67	.871	—	—	—	—	—	—	—	—
2019–20	San Antonio Rampage	AHL	42	16	17	8	2438	104	4	2.56	.909	—	—	—	—	—	—	—	—
2020–21	St. Louis Blues	NHL	17	9	6	1	918	49	1	3.21	.893	—	—	—	—	—	—	—	—
2021–22	St. Louis Blues	NHL	40	25	7	6	2342	100	2	2.56	.919	7	2	5	410	25	1	3.67	.890
2022–23	Detroit Red Wings	NHL	56	26	22	7	3220	167	4	3.11	.896	—	—	—	—	—	—	—	—
2023–24	Detroit Red Wings	NHL	19	9	5	2	1012	60	0	3.55	.892	—	—	—	—	—	—	—	—
2023–24	Grand Rapids Griffins	AHL	1	1	0	0	60	0	1	0.00	1.000	—	—	—	—	—	—	—	—
2024–25	Detroit Red Wings	NHL	9	1	5	2	439	27	0	3.69	.866	—	—	—	—	—	—	—	—
2024–25	Grand Rapids Griffins	AHL	13	8	4	0	711	32	2	2.70	.912	—	—	—	—	—	—	—	—
2024–25	San Diego Gulls	AHL	9	7	2	0	539	23	2	2.56	.907	—	—	—	—	—	—	—	—
2024–25	Anaheim Ducks	NHL	4	1	1	1	201	10	0	2.99	.925	—	—	—	—	—	—	—	—
2025–26	San Diego Gulls	AHL	17	8	6	3	986	42	3	2.55	.903	—	—	—	—	—	—	—	—
2025–26	Anaheim Ducks	NHL	20	10	8	2	1146	62	0	3.25	.884	2	0	0	85	3	0	2.12	.900
Liiga totals			121	60	33	21	7,021	244	10	2.09	.922	20	10	10	1192	32	4	1.61	.930
NHL totals			165	81	54	21	9,277	475	7	3.07	.899	9	2	5	410	28	1	3.40	.891

=== International ===
Year	Team	Event	Result	GP	W	L	T	MIN	GA	SO	GAA	SV%
2014	Finland	WJC	1st place, gold medalist(s)	2	0	1	0	90	7	0	4.68	.854
2015	Finland	WJC	7th	3	1	2	0	183	7	1	2.29	.923
Junior totals				5	1	3	0	273	14	1	3.08	.899

== Awards and honours ==
Award	Year	Ref
Liiga
All-Star Team	2016	
Urpo Ylönen Award	2016	
AHL
AHL All-Rookie Team	2018	
