= Antti Raanta =

Finnish ice hockey player (born 1989)

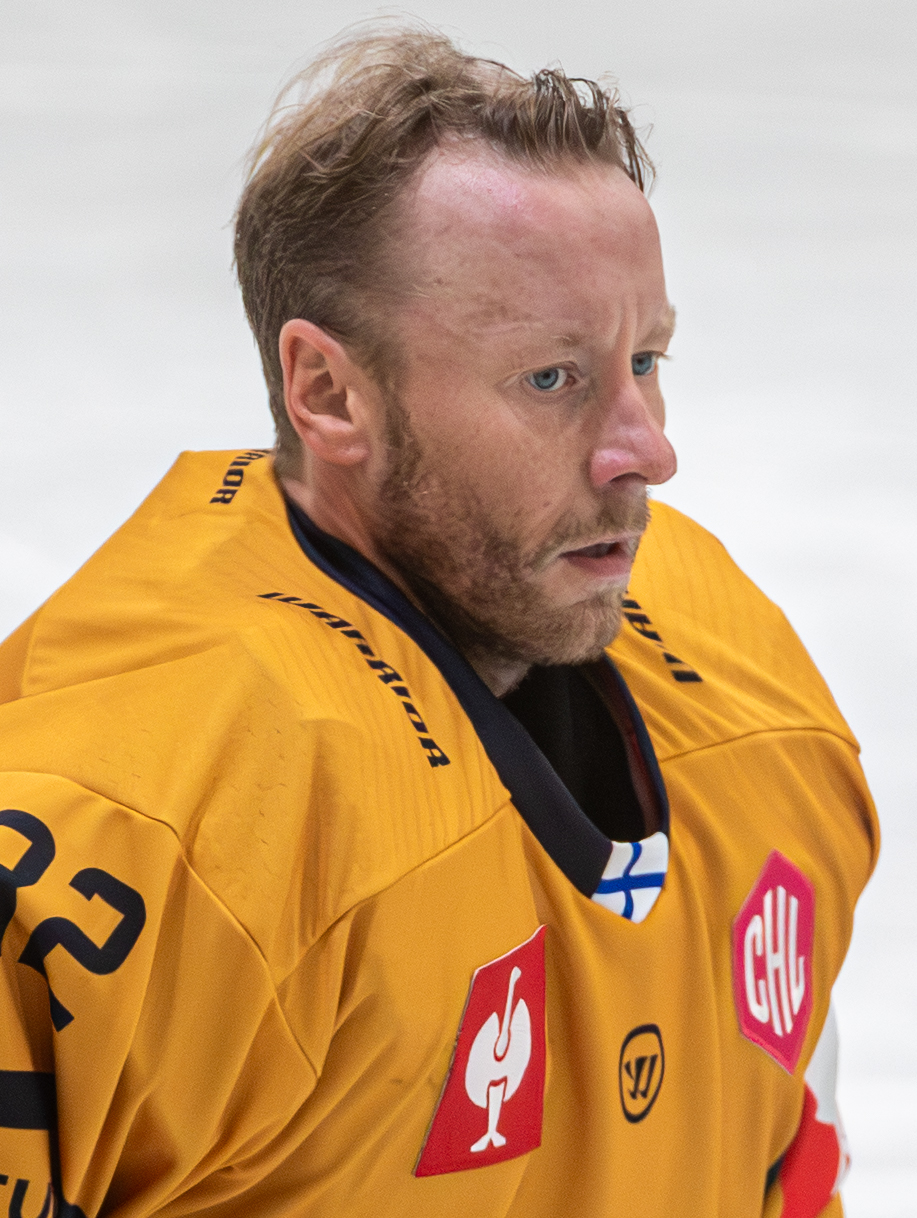
- Raanta in September 2025
- Born: 12 May 1989 (age 37) Rauma, Finland
- Height: 6 ft 0 in (183 cm)
- Weight: 193 lb (88 kg; 13 st 11 lb)
- Position: Goaltender
- Catches: Left
- Liiga team Former teams: Lukko; Ässät; Chicago Blackhawks; New York Rangers; Arizona Coyotes; Carolina Hurricanes; Genève-Servette HC
- National team: Finland
- NHL draft: Undrafted
- Playing career: 2008–present

Antti Raanta (born 12 May 1989) is a Finnish professional ice hockey goaltender who currently plays for Lukko in the Finnish Liiga. He last played with Genève-Servette HC of the National League (NL). Raanta was initially signed by the Chicago Blackhawks as an undrafted player. He has also played for the New York Rangers, Arizona Coyotes, and Carolina Hurricanes.

== Playing career ==
=== Lukko (2009–2011) ===
In March 2008, Raanta signed a three-year contract with Rauman Lukko of the Finnish Liiga. In 2009, Raanta won bronze in the Lukko U20 team and had the best save percentage in the U20 league. He was called up to the Lukko's men's team but had not yet made a Liiga debut. He played two games in Mestis when the U20 national team played against each Mestis team.

=== Ässät (2011–2013) ===
In 2013, Raanta won the Finnish championship with Ässät and was awarded both the Lasse Oksanen Trophy for the SM-liiga's best player of regular season, as well as the Jari Kurri Trophy for the best player of the playoffs, posting a .955 save percentage. In May 2013, HIFK announced that it had signed a two-year contract with Raanta, but he didn't play for them, because he had also signed a contract with the Chicago Blackhawks.

=== Chicago Blackhawks (2013–2015) ===
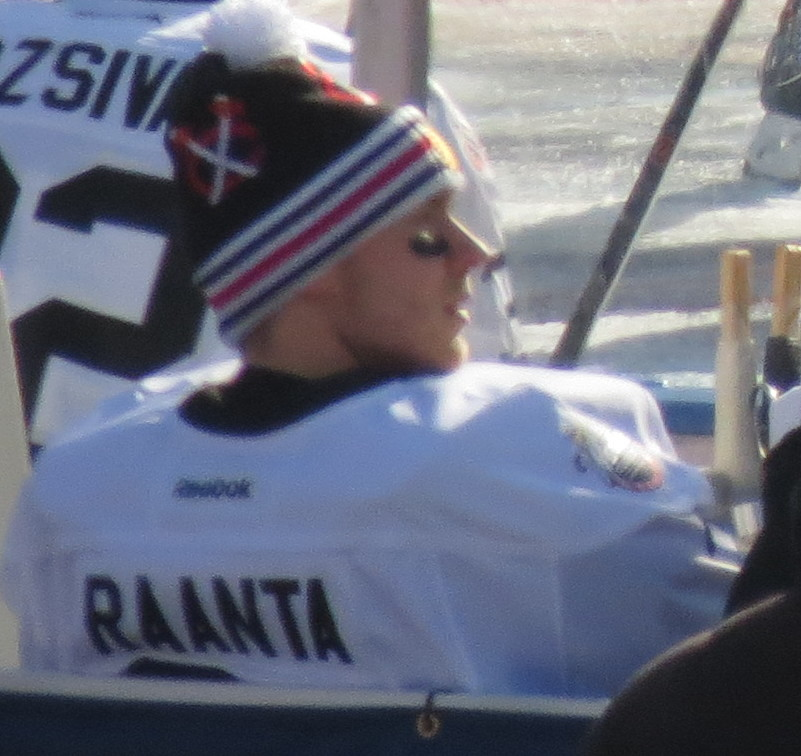
Raanta with the Chicago Blackhawks at the 2015 NHL Winter Classic

On 3 June 2013, Raanta signed a one-year, entry-level contract with the Chicago Blackhawks. He was recalled by the Blackhawks from the American Hockey League (AHL)'s Rockford IceHogs on 17 November, after Chicago's backup goaltender, Nikolai Khabibulin, suffered an injury in a loss against the Nashville Predators the previous night, 16 November. Raanta made his NHL debut against the Colorado Avalanche on 19 November, stopping 14 of 16 shots in relief of starter Corey Crawford. On 30 December, Raanta earned his first career shutout, beating the Los Angeles Kings 1–0 at home at the United Center. He stopped all 26 shots he faced and improved to 10–1–3 on the season. Raanta was named Rookie of the Month (an honour shared with Los Angeles' goaltender Martin Jones) for December 2013, going 8–1–3 with one shutout. On 12 January 2014, Raanta helped end his team's losing streak; the Blackhawks had previously lost three-straight games, with Crawford in goal for all three losses. Raanta played against the Edmonton Oilers as Chicago prevailed 5–3.

On 27 June 2014, the Blackhawks signed Raanta to a two-year contract extension.

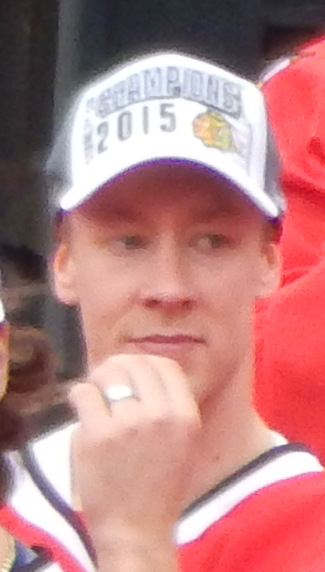
Antti Raanta in Attendance at the Chicago Blackhawks 2015 Championship Rally

In the 2014–15 season, on 15 November, the Blackhawks announced that Raanta had been assigned to the Rockford IceHogs to make room for rookie goaltender Scott Darling. On 17 December, Raanta was called up from the IceHogs and placed on the Blackhawks' roster, replacing goaltender Darling, who was himself demoted back to Rockford. However, on 22 February 2015, the Blackhawks again reassigned Raanta to the IceHogs after a 6–2 loss against the Boston Bruins, and called up Darling to take his place. Raanta was recalled on 12 April to join the Blackhawks in the 2015 playoffs, but did not dress in any more games. When the Blackhawks went on to win the Stanley Cup by defeating the Tampa Bay Lightning in six games in the 2015 Stanley Cup Final, Raanta was given a personal day with the Cup in the 2015 off-season and a Stanley Cup ring; however, he did not meet the minimum games requirement to include his name on the Stanley Cup, nor had he dressed in the playoffs, as by this time he had been relegated to the Blackhawks' third-string goaltender. Chicago did not request an exemption, because he spent time playing in the minors after the trade deadline and was not fully dressed during the playoffs.

=== New York Rangers (2015–2017) ===
Unable to earn back the backup role on the Blackhawks at season's end and maintain it, on 27 June 2015, Raanta was traded to the New York Rangers in exchange for Ryan Haggerty.

Raanta would battle Magnus Hellberg for the backup role behind Henrik Lundqvist, Raanta eventually won the battle as Hellberg was sent to the American Hockey League (AHL). Raanta was put in net for the Rangers' 17 December game against the Minnesota Wild (Lundqvist was to start the following day against the Winnipeg Jets). However, near the end of the 1st period, Raanta took a slapshot to the head from Wild defenseman Marco Scandella, and left the game. Lundqvist was put in net the remainder of the game, and the next day Raanta was put on injured reserve. Originally expected to be out 2–3 weeks, Raanta recovered faster than originally expected, returning to the Rangers lineup on 28 December. During Raanta's absence, the Rangers called up Magnus Hellberg to serve as Lundqvist's backup. Raanta made 25 appearances in the 2015–16 season, started 18 games, and finished with an 11–6–2 record. Raanta had a 2.24 GAA and a .919 Save Percentage along with one shutout.

Raanta agreed to terms on a two-year contract extension with the New York Rangers on 2 May 2016.

=== Arizona Coyotes (2017–2021) ===
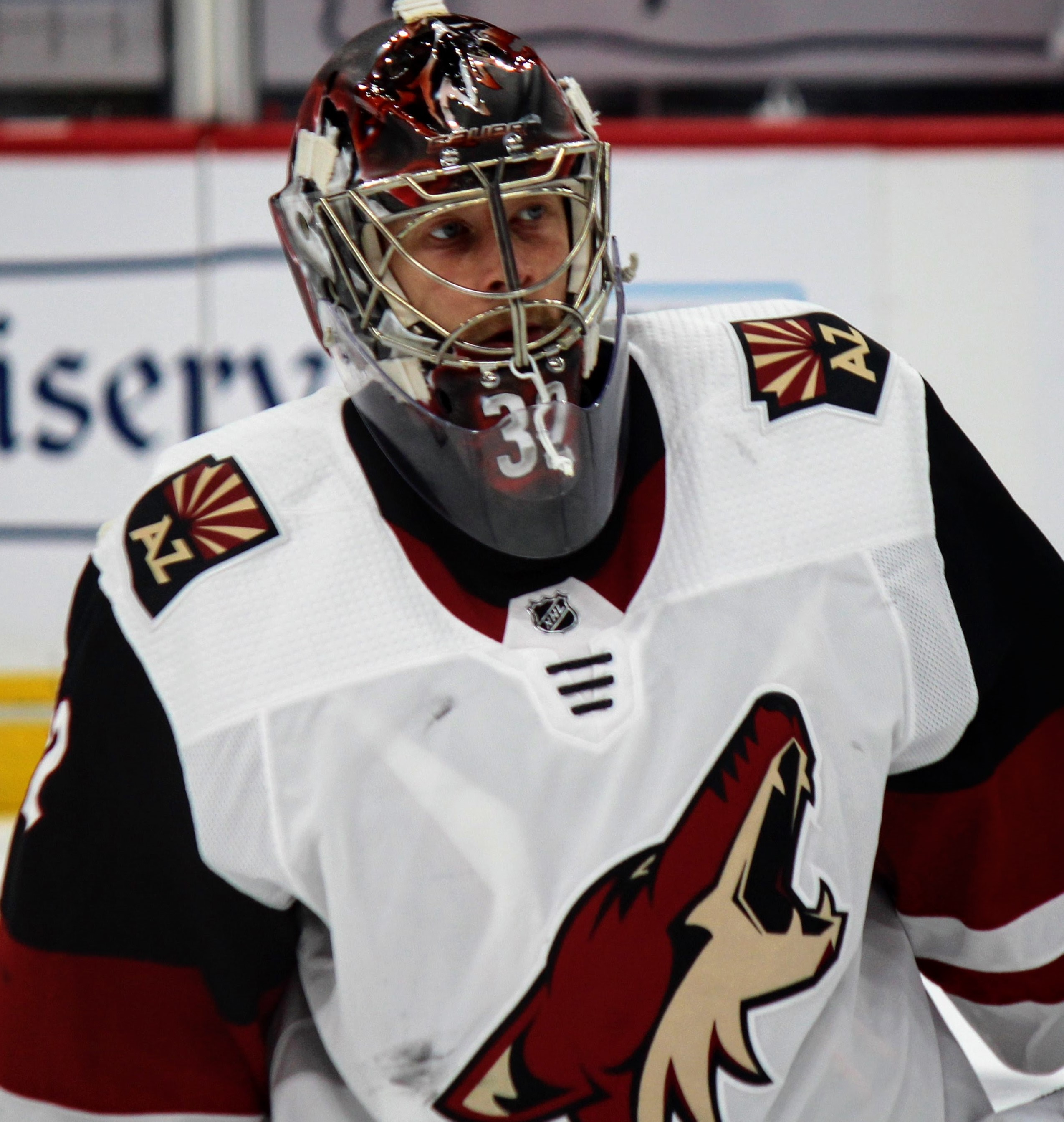
Raanta with the Arizona Coyotes in November 2019

On 23 June 2017, he was traded by the Rangers along with Derek Stepan to the Arizona Coyotes for Tony DeAngelo and the 7th overall pick in the 2017 NHL entry draft (which became Lias Andersson).

In his first season with the club, Raanta posted a 21–17–6 record in 41 appearances. However, the Coyotes failed to qualify for the 2018 Stanley Cup playoffs. On 6 April 2018, the Coyotes re-signed Raanta to a three-year, $12.75 million contract extension worth $4.25 million annually.

=== Carolina Hurricanes (2021–2024) ===
After four seasons within the Coyotes organization, largely plagued with injury, Raanta left as a free agent and was signed to a two-year, $4 million contract with the Carolina Hurricanes on 28 July 2021.

On 31 October, Raanta started his first game with the team, winning 2–1 against his former team the Arizona Coyotes. He helped the team go 8–0–0, with Frederik Andersen winning the first seven games of the season. This was the first time in his career that he was playing on a team that went undefeated. On 7 April 2022, Raanta won a 5–3 game against the Buffalo Sabres to help the team clinch a playoff spot. On 28 April, after a 6–3 win against the New Jersey Devils, Raanta along with Andersen won the William M. Jennings Trophy for allowing the least goals against average. On 2 May, Raanta started the first-round game against the Boston Bruins due to starter goaltender Andersen being injured. He won 5–1 in game one making it his first career playoff win. On 4 May, Raanta exited the game in game two after colliding with the Bruins forward David Pastrňák early in the first period. Backup goaltender Pyotr Kochetkov played the rest of that game and made it a 5–2 win making the Canes 2–0. In game four, Raanta started again losing 5–2. In game seven, Raanta helped the team to win the first round in a 3–2 win.

In his third year with Carolina during the 2023–24 season, following a stretch out of form, the Hurricanes placed Raanta on waivers on 16 December 2023, and he was subsequently reassigned to the Chicago Wolves of the AHL.

=== Post-NHL career (2024–present) ===
After finishing the season with the Wolves and failing to attract NHL interest, Raanta announced his retirement from the NHL on 15 September 2024, expressing his desire to seek opportunities in Europe.

On 23 September 2024, Raanta signed a one-year contract with Genève-Servette HC of the National League (NL). It came days after Gauthier Descloux, one of the team's netminders, was injured.

On 14 May 2025, the 36-year-old Raanta returned to his hometown team as he signed a one-year contract with Lukko after spending 14 years abroad.

== Career statistics ==
=== Regular season and playoffs ===
			Regular season									Playoffs
Season	Team	League	GP	W	L	T/OT	MIN	GA	SO	GAA	SV%	GP	W	L	MIN	GA	SO	GAA	SV%
2009–10	Lukko	SM-l	15	6	7	1	836	37	2	2.66	.918	—	—	—	—	—	—	—	—
2010–11	Lukko	SM-l	20	6	6	4	1,064	42	2	2.37	.911	2	0	2	84	6	0	4.28	.818
2011–12	Ässät	SM-l	38	21	10	4	2,149	80	2	2.23	.933	3	0	3	176	9	0	3.07	.917
2012–13	Ässät	SM-l	45	21	10	11	2,595	80	5	1.85	.943	16	12	4	1038	23	4	1.33	.954
2013–14	Rockford IceHogs	AHL	14	7	5	0	677	32	0	2.83	.914	—	—	—	—	—	—	—	—
2013–14	Chicago Blackhawks	NHL	25	13	5	4	1,397	63	1	2.71	.897	—	—	—	—	—	—	—	—
2014–15	Chicago Blackhawks	NHL	14	7	4	1	792	25	2	1.89	.936	—	—	—	—	—	—	—	—
2014–15	Rockford IceHogs	AHL	11	8	1	1	604	24	2	2.39	.918	—	—	—	—	—	—	—	—
2015–16	New York Rangers	NHL	25	11	6	2	1,151	43	1	2.24	.919	3	0	1	94	4	0	2.55	.895
2016–17	New York Rangers	NHL	30	16	8	2	1,618	61	4	2.26	.922	—	—	—	—	—	—	—	—
2017–18	Arizona Coyotes	NHL	47	21	17	6	2,600	97	3	2.24	.930	—	—	—	—	—	—	—	—
2018–19	Arizona Coyotes	NHL	12	5	6	0	688	33	0	2.88	.906	—	—	—	—	—	—	—	—
2019–20	Arizona Coyotes	NHL	33	15	14	3	1823	80	2	2.63	.921	2	0	0	40	4	0	6.00	.714
2019–20	Tucson Roadrunners	AHL	1	1	0	0	59	0	1	0.00	1.000	—	—	—	—	—	—	—	—
2020–21	Arizona Coyotes	NHL	12	5	5	2	679	38	0	3.36	.905	—	—	—	—	—	—	—	—
2021–22	Carolina Hurricanes	NHL	28	15	5	4	1517	62	2	2.45	.912	13	6	5	664	25	1	2.26	.922
2022–23	Carolina Hurricanes	NHL	27	19	3	3	1562	58	4	2.23	.910	6	3	3	364	15	0	2.48	.909
2023–24	Carolina Hurricanes	NHL	24	12	7	2	1265	63	1	2.99	.872	—	—	—	—	—	—	—	—
2023–24	Chicago Wolves	AHL	8	2	2	4	491	29	0	3.54	.873	—	—	—	—	—	—	—	—
2024–25	Genève-Servette HC	NL	24	11	10	0	1378	63	1	2.74	.902	—	—	—	—	—	—	—	—
Liiga totals			118	54	33	20	6,644	239	11	2.16	.932	21	12	8	1298	38	4	1.76	.941
NHL totals			277	139	80	29	15,087	623	20	2.48	.915	24	9	9	1,161	48	1	2.48	.911

=== International ===
Year	Team	Event	Result	GP	W	L	T	MIN	GA	SO	GAA	SV%
2013	Finland	WC	4th	7	5	2	0	430	15	1	2.09	.928
Senior totals				7	5	2	0	430	15	1	2.09	.928

== Awards and honours ==
Award	Year
SM-liiga
Lasse Oksanen Trophy	2013
Jari Kurri Trophy	2013
NHL
William M. Jennings Trophy	2022

Awards and achievements
Preceded by Marc-André Fleury; Robin Lehner	William M. Jennings Trophy; 2021–22; With: Frederik Andersen	Succeeded by Jeremy Swayman; Linus Ullmark
