= Andrew Copp =

American ice hockey player (born 1994)

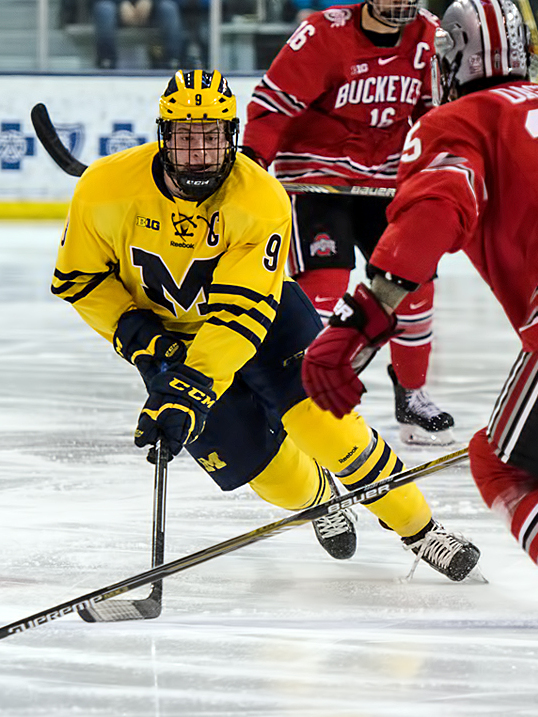
- Copp with Michigan in 2015
- Born: July 8, 1994 (age 32) Ann Arbor, Michigan, U.S.
- Height: 6 ft 1 in (185 cm)
- Weight: 205 lb (93 kg; 14 st 9 lb)
- Position: Forward
- Shoots: Left
- NHL team Former teams: Detroit Red Wings; Winnipeg Jets; New York Rangers
- National team: United States
- NHL draft: 104th overall, 2013; Winnipeg Jets
- Playing career: 2015–present

Andrew Copp (born July 8, 1994) is an American professional ice hockey player who is a forward of the Detroit Red Wings of the National Hockey League (NHL). He was selected in the fourth round, 104th overall, by the Winnipeg Jets in the 2013 NHL entry draft.

== Early life ==
Copp was born on July 8, 1994, in Ann Arbor, Michigan, U.S. to parents Andy and Anne Marie Copp. His mother was a figure skating coach for the University of Michigan Wolverines and his father coached his youth hockey teams. His younger brother Tyler also played ice hockey growing up, but chose to pursue golf and attend Mercer University.

== Playing career ==
As a youth, Copp played in the 2007 Quebec International Pee-Wee Hockey Tournament with the Detroit Compuware minor ice hockey team. The following year, he began to pursue football after his father suggested he needed to increase his physicality on the ice for hockey scouts. He continued to play quarterback while attending Skyline High School and set numerous school records in his senior year. Within the first six games of the 2011–12 season, Copp had thrown for 1,732 yards and 27 touchdowns (TD), including a state-record 557 yards and seven TDs against Pioneer. However, he suffered a broken collarbone in early October during a game against Temperance Bedford by the hands of Austin Riedmaier and missed the remainder of the season. Upon recovering from his injury, Copp accepted an NCAA Division I scholarship offer to play for the Michigan Wolverines men's ice hockey team.

=== Collegiate ===
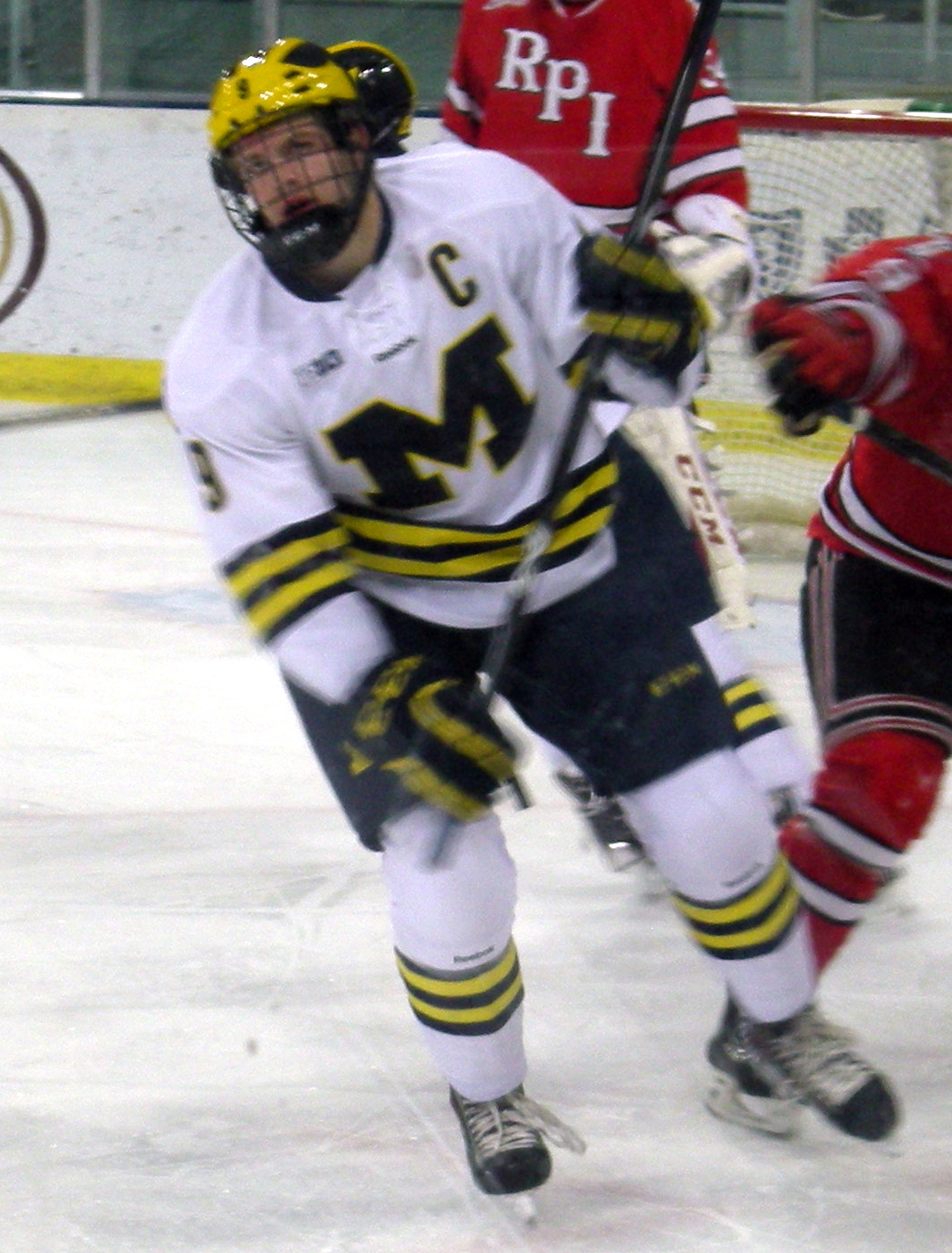
Copp during a game against RPI in 2014.

Copp played three seasons with the Michigan Wolverines men's ice hockey team, including one as team captain. In his freshman season, which was also the Wolverines last in the Central Collegiate Hockey Association, he saw limited time on ice as the team struggled offensively. He ended the season with 11 goals and 10 assists in 38 games. At the end of his freshman season, his second year of draft eligibility, Copp was ranked 142nd amongst North American skaters by the NHL Central Scouting Bureau and was drafted 104th overall by the Winnipeg Jets in the 2013 NHL entry draft.

After attending the Jets' Development camp, Copp returned to the Wolverines for his sophomore season as an alternate captain. He broke out offensively in his second year, recording 29 points for second on the team in scoring and earning an All-Big Ten Honorable Mention. At the beginning of the season, he was the recipient of the first Big Ten First Star Award after recording five points over two games. In December, Copp was named to the 2014 United States men's national junior ice hockey team Preliminary Roster prior to the 2014 World Junior Ice Hockey Championships.

Copp returned to the Wolverines for his junior, and final, season as the 85th captain in the history of the program. He was the first junior captain since Luke Glendening during the 2010–11 season. He skated in 36 games and recorded 14 goals and 17 assists. For his performance leading the Wolverines, he was recognized by the NCAA and earned All-Big Ten second-team honours. Copp opted to forgo his senior year of college hockey eligibility and signed a three-year entry-level contract with the Jets on March 26, 2015.

=== Professional ===
==== Winnipeg Jets ====
Copp made his NHL debut on April 11, 2015, playing on a line with Lee Stempniak and Matthew Halischuk against the Calgary Flames. During the game, he assisted on Stempniak's goal helping the Jets beat the Flames 5–1. Following this, he was invited to the Jets' Rookie Camp in September 2015 and competed in their exhibition games. As a result of his efforts, Copp was named to the Jets' opening night roster and recorded his second career assist in the season opener against the Boston Bruins. His first career goal came at the end of month during a 3–2 win over the Columbus Blue Jackets.

Following the season, Copp was offered two-year, $1.5 million average annual value contract but chose to file for salary arbitration. The neutral arbitrator awarded him a two-year, $4.56 million extension with the Jets.

After colliding with Carolina Hurricanes forward Jordan Staal during the second period of a Jets' 6–3 loss, Copp was listed as day-to-day by the team and missed their remaining three games before the Christmas break. On March 24, 2021, Copp scored his first career NHL hat-trick (as well as his first career NHL 4 goal game) in a 5–1 Jets win over the Vancouver Canucks.

==== New York Rangers ====
Copp was traded to the New York Rangers at the trade deadline on March 21, 2022, along with a sixth-round draft pick in exchange for Morgan Barron, a fifth-round draft pick and two conditional second-round draft picks. Copp scored his first goal with the Rangers a couple days later on March 25, in a 5–1 win over the Pittsburgh Penguins. On April 21, during a game against the New York Islanders, Copp recorded his second career hat-trick. He was the third player in Rangers history to score a hat-trick in the first period, joining Don Raleigh (1948) and Kelly Kisio (1986). He also became the only Rangers player to score the first three goals of the game.

==== Detroit Red Wings ====
On July 13, 2022, Copp signed a five-year, $28.125 million contract with the Detroit Red Wings.

In the midst of the 2024–25 season, his third with the Red Wings, Copp recorded ten goals and 13 assists for 23 points through 56 regular season games before he suffered a torn pectoral muscle injury during a game against the Minnesota Wild on February 23, 2025. On February 26, 2025, he underwent surgery to repair his pectoral with a recovery of 4–6 months which ruled him out for the remainder of the season.

== International play ==
Medal record

Ice hockey

Representing the United States

IIHF World U18 Championship
Gold medal – first place	2012 Czech Republic	

Copp represented the United States at the 2012 IIHF World U18 Championships where he recorded one assist in six games and won a gold medal.

== Career statistics ==
=== Regular season and playoffs ===
			Regular season					Playoffs
Season	Team	League	GP	G	A	Pts	PIM	GP	G	A	Pts	PIM
2010–11	Compuware 18U AAA	T1EHL	17	2	7	9	6	—	—	—	—	—
2010–11	U.S. NTDP Juniors	USHL	22	1	4	5	4	1	0	0	0	0
2010–11	U.S. NTDP U17	USDP	24	1	4	5	4	—	—	—	—	—
2010–11	U.S. NTDP U18	USDP	6	1	0	1	0	—	—	—	—	—
2011–12	U.S. NTDP Juniors	USHL	18	3	7	10	2	—	—	—	—	—
2011–12	U.S. NTDP U17	USDP	9	5	6	11	2	—	—	—	—	—
2011–12	U.S. NTDP U18	USDP	23	1	5	6	2	—	—	—	—	—
2012–13	University of Michigan	CCHA	38	11	10	21	12	—	—	—	—	—
2013–14	University of Michigan	B1G	33	15	14	29	26	—	—	—	—	—
2014–15	University of Michigan	B1G	36	14	17	31	29	—	—	—	—	—
2014–15	Winnipeg Jets	NHL	1	0	1	1	0	—	—	—	—	—
2015–16	Winnipeg Jets	NHL	77	7	6	13	6	—	—	—	—	—
2016–17	Manitoba Moose	AHL	8	0	5	5	4	—	—	—	—	—
2016–17	Winnipeg Jets	NHL	64	9	8	17	18	—	—	—	—	—
2017–18	Winnipeg Jets	NHL	82	9	19	28	14	16	1	2	3	4
2018–19	Winnipeg Jets	NHL	69	11	14	25	6	6	0	5	5	2
2019–20	Winnipeg Jets	NHL	63	10	16	26	10	4	2	0	2	4
2020–21	Winnipeg Jets	NHL	55	15	24	39	20	8	0	2	2	4
2021–22	Winnipeg Jets	NHL	56	13	22	35	8	—	—	—	—	—
2021–22	New York Rangers	NHL	16	8	10	18	8	20	6	8	14	2
2022–23	Detroit Red Wings	NHL	82	9	33	42	25	—	—	—	—	—
2023–24	Detroit Red Wings	NHL	79	13	20	33	26	—	—	—	—	—
2024–25	Detroit Red Wings	NHL	56	10	13	23	8	—	—	—	—	—
2025–26	Detroit Red Wings	NHL	79	9	34	43	24	—	—	—	—	—
NHL totals			779	123	220	343	173	54	9	17	26	16

=== International ===
Year	Team	Event	Result	GP	G	A	Pts	PIM
2012	United States	U18	1st place, gold medalist(s)	6	0	1	1	0
2014	United States	WJC	5th	5	0	5	5	2
2017	United States	WC	5th	8	1	0	1	4
Junior totals				11	0	6	6	2
Senior totals				8	1	0	1	4
