= 2021–22 NHL season =

National Hockey League season

- League: National Hockey League
- Sport: Ice hockey
- Duration: October 12, 2021 – June 26, 2022
- Games: 82
- Teams: 32
- TV partner(s): Sportsnet/SN1/SN360, Citytv, CBC, TVA Sports (Canada); ESPN/ESPN2/ABC, TNT/TBS (United States)
- Streaming partner(s): Sportsnet Now (Canada); ESPN+/Hulu (United States)

Draft
- Top draft pick: Owen Power
- Picked by: Buffalo Sabres

Regular season
- Presidents' Trophy: Florida Panthers
- Season MVP: Auston Matthews (Maple Leafs)
- Top scorer: Connor McDavid (Oilers)

Playoffs
- Playoffs MVP: Cale Makar (Avalanche)

Stanley Cup
- Champions: Colorado Avalanche
- Runners-up: Tampa Bay Lightning

NHL seasons
- 2020–21 2022–23

The 2021–22 NHL season was the 105th season of operation (104th season of play) of the National Hockey League (NHL). The league expanded to 32 teams with the addition of the Seattle Kraken. The league had an October-to-April regular season scheduling and a full 82-game regular season for the first time since the 2018–19 NHL season as the previous two NHL seasons were shortened due to the COVID-19 pandemic. The league also restored its pre-COVID-19 Eastern and Western conferences. The season began on October 12.

On December 22, all games were suspended league-wide through at least December 26 (officially termed as an extension of the regularly scheduled Christmas break), in order to reconcile COVID-19 outbreaks that had impacted a large number of teams and resulted in various game postponements. Most teams were scheduled to resume play on December 28, but the home games of all seven Canadian teams through early January were further postponed due to COVID-19 attendance restrictions imposed by provincial health authorities.

The playoffs concluded on June 26, with the Colorado Avalanche defeating the Tampa Bay Lightning in the Stanley Cup Final in six games, winning their third Stanley Cup in franchise history.

== League business ==
=== Expansion ===
On December 4, 2018, the NHL confirmed that it had granted an expansion franchise in the city of Seattle. The team was named the Seattle Kraken on July 23, 2020. On April 30, 2021, the team was permitted to begin making trades and signing players after sending its final expansion payment to the league. The 2021 NHL expansion draft was held on July 21, 2021, to fill out the Kraken roster.

=== Realignment ===
The league returned to the previous alignment with Eastern and Western conferences. As planned before the COVID-19 pandemic, the Seattle Kraken were placed in the Pacific Division and the Arizona Coyotes were moved to the Central Division. If the cross-border travel restrictions had continued for another year, the league would have been forced to use a temporary alignment with an all-Canadian division for a second year.

=== Entry draft ===
The 2021 NHL entry draft was held July 23–24, 2021, with Owen Power being selected first overall by the Buffalo Sabres. For the second consecutive year the draft was conducted in a remote format due to the COVID-19 pandemic, hosted from the NHL Network studios in Secaucus, New Jersey.

=== Sponsorships ===
As in the previous season, NHL teams were allowed to display sponsor logos (helmet entitlement partner) on their helmets. The Edmonton Oilers and Philadelphia Flyers did not have a sponsor, opting to have the traditional team logo on their helmets. The remaining teams have the following helmet sponsors for this season:

- Anaheim: UCI Health
- Arizona: MedSupply (away)
- Boston: TD Bank (Note: Sponsor retained from previous season. Not to be confused with Canadian parent company Toronto-Dominion Bank which sponsors the Vancouver Canucks' helmets.)
- Buffalo: KeyBank (away) (Note: Sponsor retained from previous season.)
- Calgary: Telus (away)
- Carolina: Lenovo
- Chicago: Belle Tire
- Colorado: Ball Corporation (Note: Sponsor retained from previous season. For the first 13 games of the season, the Avalanche's helmets featured the team logo.)
- Columbus: Designer Shoe Warehouse (DSW) (home), iDesign (away)
- Dallas: Energy Transfer (home), 7-Eleven (away)
- Detroit: Meijer
- Florida: Amerant Bank (home)
- Los Angeles: Spectrum
- Minnesota: Toyota
- Montreal: Bell Canada (home), CIBC (away)
- Nashville: Vanderbilt Health (home), Nashville Convention & Visitors Corp. (away) (Note: The away helmets featured the "Nashville – Music City" logo representing the NCVC.)
- New Jersey: Prudential Financial (home), Razu (away) (Note: Sponsor retained from previous season. Initially, Prudential allowed advertisements from Black-owned businesses to appear on the Devils' helmets for 13 games. On December 8, Prudential and the Devils announced that Razu, a New Jersey-based networking and digital platform for musicians, would become the team's road helmet sponsor for the rest of the season.)
- New York Islanders: Northwell Health (home), UBS (away)
- New York Rangers: Benjamin Moore Paints
- Ottawa: Bet99 (home)
- Pittsburgh: Bold Penguin Insurance (home), PPG Industries (away)
- St. Louis: Stifel (home), Enterprise Rent-A-Car (away)
- San Jose: SAP (away)
- Seattle: Amazon (Note: The home blue helmet will feature the Amazon "smile" logo, while the road white helmet will feature Amazon's Climate Pledge initiative.)
- Tampa Bay: Tampa General Hospital (Note: Sponsor retained on road helmets, replaces previous sponsor DEX Imaging on home helmets.)
- Toronto: TikTok
- Vancouver: Toronto-Dominion Bank (Note: Not to be confused with American subsidiary TD Bank which sponsors the Boston Bruins' helmets and holds naming rights to TD Garden.)
- Vegas: Credit One Bank (home), P3 Health Partners (away)
- Washington: Capital One
- Winnipeg: Bell Canada

== Coaching changes ==
Coaching changes
Off–season
Team	2020–21 coach	2021–22 coach	Notes
Arizona Coyotes	Rick Tocchet	Andre Tourigny	On May 9, 2021, Tocchet and the Coyotes mutually agreed to part ways at the end of Tocchet's contract, one day after the team's final game of the 2020–21 season. Tocchet coached the Coyotes for four seasons, compiling a 125–131–34 record, with one playoff appearance in 2020. On July 1, Tourigny was named head coach.
Buffalo Sabres	Ralph Krueger; Don Granato*	Don Granato	Krueger was fired on March 17, 2021, after parts of two seasons with Buffalo, with the team suffering a 6–18–4 start and a 12-game losing streak. Krueger totaled a 36–49–12 record during his short tenure, and failed to lead the team to the playoffs in his lone complete season. Assistant coach Granato was named interim head coach. Granato was named the permanent head coach on June 29.
Columbus Blue Jackets	John Tortorella	Brad Larsen	On May 9, 2021, one day after the Blue Jackets' last game of the 2020–21 season, Tortorella and the team agreed to mutually parts ways after Tortorella's contract expired. Tortorella coached the Blue Jackets since the 2015–16 season and registered a 227–166–54 record, with four playoff appearances. On June 10, assistant coach Larsen was named head coach.
Montreal Canadiens	Claude Julien; Dominique Ducharme*	Dominique Ducharme	Julien was fired on February 24, 2021, after parts of five seasons during his second stint as head coach of the Canadiens, which had registered a 9–5–4 record to start the season. Julien compiled a 129–123–35 record during his second stint and the team reached the playoffs twice during his tenure, never advancing past the first round. Assistant coach Ducharme was named interim head coach. On July 13, Ducharme was named the permanent head coach and signed a three-year extension with the team.
New York Rangers	David Quinn	Gerard Gallant	Quinn was fired on May 12, 2021, after serving as team's head coach for three seasons. The Rangers went 96–87–25 under Quinn and made the playoffs once. On June 16, Gallant was named head coach.
Seattle Kraken	Expansion team	Dave Hakstol	On June 24, 2021, the Kraken named Hakstol, who previously served as head coach of the Philadelphia Flyers, as the franchise's first head coach.
In–season
Team	Outgoing coach	Incoming coach	Notes
Chicago Blackhawks	Jeremy Colliton	Derek King*	Colliton was fired on November 6, 2021, after parts of four seasons with Chicago, with the team starting the season 1–9–2. In his tenure, Colliton compiled an 87–92–26 record and led the team to the first round of the playoffs in 2020. King, previously the head coach of the Blackhawks' American Hockey League (AHL) affiliate Rockford IceHogs, was promoted to interim head coach.
Edmonton Oilers	Dave Tippett	Jay Woodcroft	Tippett was fired on February 10, 2022, after Edmonton began the season 23–18–3; after starting the season 16–5–0, the Oilers had since registered a record of 7–13–3. In approximately two and a half seasons with Edmonton, Tippett totaled a 95–62–14 record with two playoff berths, failing to advance past the first round. Woodcroft, formerly the head coach of the Oilers' AHL affiliate Bakersfield Condors, was promoted to head coach the next day.
Florida Panthers	Joel Quenneville	Andrew Brunette*	Quenneville resigned on October 28, 2021, after the results of an internal investigation revealed that he had improperly handled an accusation of sexual assault during his tenure as head coach of the Chicago Blackhawks in 2010. Quenneville totaled a 79–40–13 record in just over two seasons with the Panthers, reaching the playoffs twice but failing to advance past the first round. Assistant coach Brunette was named interim head coach.
Montreal Canadiens	Dominique Ducharme	Martin St. Louis*	Ducharme was fired on February 9, 2022, after the Canadiens began the season 8–30–7, with the team last in the league at his time of departure. In his brief tenure over parts of two seasons, Ducharme registered a 23–46–14 record, reaching the Stanley Cup Final in 2021. St. Louis was named interim head coach later in the day.
Philadelphia Flyers	Alain Vigneault	Mike Yeo*	Vigneault was fired on December 6, 2021, after the Flyers began the season 8–10–4. Vigneault compiled a 74–54–19 record in just over two seasons with Philadelphia, reaching the second round of the playoffs in 2020. Assistant coach Yeo was retained and named interim head coach.
Vancouver Canucks	Travis Green	Bruce Boudreau	Green was fired on December 5, 2021, after an 8–15–2 start to the season. In just over four seasons with Vancouver, Green totaled a 133–147–34 record, leading the team to the second round of the playoffs in 2020. Boudreau, most recently the head coach of the Minnesota Wild from 2016 to 2020, was named head coach the same day.
Winnipeg Jets	Paul Maurice	Dave Lowry*	Maurice resigned on December 17, 2021, after the Jets started the season 13–10–5. In just under eight and a half seasons with Winnipeg, Maurice totaled a 315–223–62 record, with five playoff appearances. Assistant coach Lowry was named interim head coach.

(*) Indicates interim.

== Front office changes ==
General managers
In–season
Team	Outgoing general manager	Incoming general manager	Notes
Anaheim Ducks	Bob Murray	Jeff Solomon*; Pat Verbeek	Murray resigned on November 10, 2021, one day after being placed on administrative leave due to an investigation of alleged unprofessional conduct. Murray had joined the Ducks organization in 2005 as senior vice president of hockey operations, winning a Stanley Cup in 2007, before being promoted to general manager in 2008. He had also briefly served as the Ducks' interim head coach during the 2018–19 season. Assistant general manager and vice president of hockey operations Solomon was named interim general manager. Verbeek, who most recently was general manager of the Grand Rapids Griffins, the AHL affiliate of the Detroit Red Wings, was named general manager on February 3, 2022.
Chicago Blackhawks	Stan Bowman	Kyle Davidson	Bowman resigned on October 26, 2021, after the results of an internal investigation revealed that he had improperly handled an accusation of sexual assault within the Blackhawks organization in 2010. Bowman had been with the organization since 2001, and was named general manager in 2009, before ultimately being promoted further to president of hockey operations in 2020. His tenure included three Stanley Cup victories. Assistant general manager Davidson was named interim general manager, before being promoted to permanent general manager on March 1, 2022.
Montreal Canadiens	Marc Bergevin	Jeff Gorton* (As executive vice president of hockey operations); Kent Hughes	Bergevin was fired on November 28, 2021, after the Canadiens started the season 6–15–2. Bergevin had served as general manager of the Canadiens since 2012, overseeing three division championships and a Stanley Cup Final appearance in 2021. Gorton, most recently general manager of the New York Rangers, and who had been hired earlier in the day, was retained and named executive vice president of hockey operations in order to "assure the continuity of day-to-day operations," effectively serving as the interim general manager. Hughes, formerly a player agent, was named general manager on January 18, 2022.
San Jose Sharks	Doug Wilson	Joe Will*	Wilson resigned on April 7, 2022, for medical reasons, with the Sharks holding a record of 29–31–9. Wilson had served as general manager of the Sharks since 2003, overseeing fourteen playoff appearances, five Pacific Division titles, one Presidents' Trophy, and one Stanley Cup Final appearance. Will, the assistant general manager at the time, assumed the role of interim general manager.
Vancouver Canucks	Jim Benning	Stan Smyl*; Jim Rutherford*; Patrik Allvin	Benning was fired on December 6, 2021, after the Canucks started the season 8–15–2. Benning had served as general manager of the Canucks since 2014, overseeing two playoff appearances. Smyl, who had served as senior advisor to the general manager since 2008, was promoted to interim general manager. On December 9, Rutherford, most recently general manager of the Pittsburgh Penguins, was hired as president of hockey operations, and assumed the role of interim general manager. Allvin, who was most recently an assistant GM for the Pittsburgh Penguins and briefly served as interim general manager after Rutherford resigned at Pittsburgh, was named general manager on January 26, 2022.

(*) Indicates interim.

== Arena changes and regulations ==
- The city of Glendale announced on August 19, 2021, that it would not be renewing its year-to-year lease of Gila River Arena with the Arizona Coyotes following the season, effectively evicting the team.
- The Florida Panthers' home arena BB&T Center was renamed FLA Live Arena, after Truist Financial (formed from the merger of BB&T and SunTrust) declined to renew its naming rights.
- The Los Angeles Kings' home arena Staples Center was renamed Crypto.com Arena on December 25, 2021, as part of a naming rights agreement with Crypto.com.
- The New York Islanders began playing at the newly constructed UBS Arena for the 2021–22 season.
- The Seattle Kraken began playing at Climate Pledge Arena, a redevelopment of KeyArena—former home of the Seattle SuperSonics of the National Basketball Association (NBA). Amazon bought the naming rights to the arena, and chose to brand it as part of its partnership with Global Optimism on a pledge for its operations (and by extension, the arena) to become carbon neutral.
- The Winnipeg Jets' home arena Bell MTS Place was renamed Canada Life Centre, as part of a naming rights agreement with Canada Life.

=== COVID-19 restrictions ===
Unlike the previous season (where most games were either played behind closed doors or with a reduced spectator capacity), with the loosening of restrictions across Canada and the United States due to COVID-19 vaccination progress, the NHL anticipated that every team would be able to have capacity crowds (if not near-capacity) at the start of the 2021–22 season. Some teams, including all Canadian teams, required attendees to present proof of vaccination for all or part of the season.

In December 2021, all Canadian NHL teams began to reintroduce capacity restrictions due to concerns over the local spread of the highly-infectious Omicron variant. By December 21, all Canadian NHL teams besides Montreal had been restricted to 50% capacity per provincial public health orders, with Alberta and Ontario also restricting the consumption of food and drink in order to strengthen face mask mandates. One initial exception was the Montreal Canadiens; after requesting that the Canadiens December 16 home game be played behind closed doors, the Quebec provincial government formally prohibited spectators at all professional sporting events effective December 20. On December 27, the Manitoba government restricted all public gatherings to a maximum of 250 people, including sporting events; the Jets therefore announced that all home games would be played behind closed doors until further notice.

On December 28, the NHL announced that nine games in Canada (four in Montreal, two in Winnipeg, one each in Calgary, Ottawa and Toronto) would be postponed as a result of attendance restrictions in these cities. Effective December 31, 2021, large venues in Ontario were also restricted to a maximum of 1,000 spectators; MLSE announced that all Maple Leafs home games would be played behind closed doors until further notice. At this time, the NHL began to postpone some Canadian home games, specifically citing attendance restrictions as reasoning. On January 3, 2022, the Ontario government rolled back the province to modified Stage 2 restrictions, which effectively mandated that all sporting events be held behind closed doors.

Although Ontario began to lift some of these restrictions beginning January 31, large venues remained capped at a maximum of 500 spectators. The Ottawa Senators began to re-admit spectators within this limitation. On February 8, 2022, Manitoba allowed sporting events to return to 50% capacity. The same day, Alberta deprecated the "Restrictions Exemption Program", which required non-essential venues to mandate proof of vaccination or a negative test in order to operate at the maximum allowed capacity—then 50% in large venues. Alberta also began to allow concessions to be consumed in seats. All other capacity restrictions were lifted effective March 1.

On February 15 and 16, the Manitoba and British Columbia governments lifted restrictions on venue capacity, although their respective proof of vaccination requirements remain in force. Manitoba lifted proof of vaccination on March 1, but B.C. would maintain it through at least the end of June. The next day, the Ontario government eased attendance restrictions to allow 50% capacity, before allowing venues to return to full capacity March 1. The Alberta-based teams followed suit the same day. On February 21, the Quebec government eased attendance restrictions to allow 50% capacity; before returning to full capacity crowds on March 12.

== Regular season ==
The league returned to its normal October-to-April, 82-game regular season. The entire schedule was released on July 22, with October 12 planned for opening night.

=== Outdoor games ===
The league held the following outdoor games:

- The Winter Classic was held on January 1, 2022, at Target Field in Minneapolis, with the Minnesota Wild hosting the St. Louis Blues. This was originally scheduled for 2021, but was postponed due to the pandemic.
- The Stadium Series was held on February 26, 2022, at Nissan Stadium in Nashville, Tennessee, with the Nashville Predators hosting the Tampa Bay Lightning. The postponed 2021 game was planned to be hosted by the Carolina Hurricanes at Carter–Finley Stadium in Raleigh, North Carolina, against an opponent yet to be announced. The Hurricanes asked the league to postpone their outdoor game for at least another season, with team president and general manager Don Waddell stating that they wanted "to assure a safe environment".
- The Heritage Classic was held on March 13, 2022, at Tim Hortons Field in Hamilton, Ontario, with the Buffalo Sabres hosting the Toronto Maple Leafs.

=== Postponed games ===
==== COVID-19-related ====
- Three Ottawa Senators games (on the road at the New Jersey Devils on November 16, and at home against the Nashville Predators and New York Rangers on November 18 and 20) were postponed after 10 Ottawa players and an assistant coach were placed on the COVID-19 protocol list. The road game at New Jersey was made up on December 6.
- Two New York Islanders games (both road games at the New York Rangers and Philadelphia Flyers on November 28 and 30) were postponed after eight Islanders players were placed on the protocol list. The Islanders won all their COVID-19 protocol rescheduled games this season. The road game at the Rangers was rescheduled on March 17, and the road game at the Flyers was rescheduled on January 18.
- Six Calgary Flames games (two road games at the Chicago Blackhawks and Nashville Predators on December 13 and 14, and four home games against the Toronto Maple Leafs on December 16, the Columbus Blue Jackets on December 18, the Anaheim Ducks on December 21, and the Seattle Kraken on December 23) were postponed after 19 Flames players and 12 staffers, including head coach Darryl Sutter, were placed on the protocol list.
- A Carolina Hurricanes road game against the Minnesota Wild on December 14 was postponed after six Hurricanes players and one staff member were placed on the protocol list.
- Four Boston Bruins games (road games at the Montreal Canadiens on December 18 and Ottawa Senators on December 19, and home games against the Carolina Hurricanes on December 21 and Colorado Avalanche on December 23) were postponed after eight Bruins players were placed on the protocol list. The Avalanche also postponed three games in addition to the December 23 game in Boston (home game against the Tampa Bay Lightning on December 18, and road games at the Detroit Red Wings and Buffalo Sabres on December 20 and 22) due to five Avalanche players entering protocol. The Red Wings' road game at the Minnesota Wild on December 23 was also postponed due to nine Red Wings players and three coaches entering protocol.
- Three Florida Panthers games (two road games at the Minnesota Wild and Chicago Blackhawks on December 18 and 21, and a home game against the Nashville Predators on December 23), were postponed after seven Panthers players were placed on the protocol list. The Predators also postponed two games in addition to the December 23 game at Florida (road game at the Carolina Hurricanes on December 19, and a home game against the Winnipeg Jets on December 21) due to eight Predators players entering the protocol list.
- Two Toronto Maple Leafs road games (at the Vancouver Canucks on December 18 and Seattle Kraken on December 19) were postponed after seven Maple Leafs players were placed on the protocol list. The Canucks' home game against the Arizona Coyotes on December 19 was also postponed due to five Canucks players entering protocol. The Coyotes–Kraken game on December 21 was also postponed.
- On December 19, the NHL and NHLPA agreed to postpone all cross-border games through the regularly scheduled Christmas break. This impacts 12 games through December 23.
- The Columbus Blue Jackets postponed both of its games against the Buffalo Sabres (road game on December 21, home game on December 23) due to COVID-19 concerns. The Pittsburgh Penguins' home game against the New Jersey Devils, and the Philadelphia Flyers' home game against the Washington Capitals on December 21 were also postponed for the same reason.
- On December 21, the NHL and NHLPA agreed to postpone all games and close all team facilities from December 22 through the regularly scheduled Christmas break (ending December 26). On December 24, it was announced that this suspension of play will continue through December 27, but that teams would be allowed to resume practices on December 26. On December 26, the NHL announced that it would return to play on December 28. However, six games were later postponed due to COVID-19 concerns. These include two games involving the Chicago Blackhawks (home game against the Columbus Blue Jackets on December 28, and road game at the Winnipeg Jets on December 29), two games between the Dallas Stars and the Colorado Avalanche (at Colorado on December 29, at Dallas on December 31), and two games scheduled on December 29 (Pittsburgh Penguins at the Toronto Maple Leafs, and the Boston Bruins at the Ottawa Senators). The league also announced that it would reinstate the temporary rule from the previous season allowing teams to have taxi squads, in an effort to reduce the impact of players entering the protocol list.
- Twenty NHL games hosted by the seven Canadian teams were postponed due to attendance restrictions. As announced on December 28, these initially included four Montreal Canadiens home games (January 4 against the Washington Capitals, January 5 against the Toronto Maple Leafs, January 8 against the Buffalo Sabres, and January 10 against the Columbus Blue Jackets), three Winnipeg Jets games (on the road at the Calgary Flames on December 31, and home games against the Seattle Kraken and the Minnesota Wild on January 8 and 10), the Ottawa Senators' home game against the Pittsburgh Penguins on December 31, and the Toronto Maple Leafs' home game against the Carolina Hurricanes on January 3. The Boston Bruins–Montreal Canadiens game on January 12 was moved from Montreal's Bell Centre to Boston's TD Garden, with a game in Montreal to be played at a later date. In addition, the December 29 game between the Detroit Red Wings and the New York Islanders was postponed due to COVID-19 concerns. On December 31, a further eight Canadian games were postponed, including three New York Islanders road games (against the Vancouver Canucks on January 5, the Edmonton Oilers on January 8, and the Calgary Flames on January 11), two Minnesota Wild road games (against Ottawa on January 3 and Edmonton on January 12), two Vegas Golden Knights road games (against Edmonton on January 14 and Calgary on January 15), and Winnipeg's home game against Edmonton on January 16. On January 5, the New Jersey Devils' road games at the Montreal Canadiens (January 15) and the Toronto Maple Leafs (January 17), and the Chicago Blackhawks' road game at the Edmonton Oilers on January 18, were also postponed for the same reason. Additionally, due to the postponement of their other road games, the Islanders' game at Seattle on January 4 was also postponed.
- The January 2 game between the Dallas Stars and the Arizona Coyotes was postponed due to COVID-19 concerns involving the Stars.
- The January 6 game between the Ottawa Senators and the Seattle Kraken was postponed due to COVID-19 concerns involving the Senators. The Senators' road games at the Vancouver Canucks (January 8) and the Winnipeg Jets (January 15) were also postponed due to attendance restrictions in Canada. On January 9, the NHL rescheduled the Senators' road game at the Edmonton Oilers from January 10 to January 15 due to COVID-19 concerns affecting the Oilers.
- To accommodate the rescheduled New York Islanders–Philadelphia Flyers game (see above), the Flyers' home game against the Detroit Red Wings, and the Islanders' home game against the Columbus Blue Jackets, were rescheduled from January 18 to a date to be determined. In addition, due to the aforementioned attendance restrictions in Canada, the Islanders' game against the Toronto Maple Leafs on January 22 was moved from Toronto's Scotiabank Arena to New York's UBS Arena, with the original game in Toronto rescheduled to April 17.
- The January 6 game between the Detroit Red Wings and the Anaheim Ducks was rescheduled to January 9 due to COVID-19 concerns involving the Ducks.
- The January 10 game between the Tampa Bay Lightning and the New Jersey Devils was postponed due to COVID-19 concerns involving the Devils.
- The January 11 game between the Carolina Hurricanes and the Philadelphia Flyers was postponed due to COVID-19 concerns involving the Flyers.
- On January 19, the NHL published substantial updates to its regular season schedule, most notably rescheduling 95 prior COVID-19-affected games to the former Olympic break between February 7 and February 22. A number of other games scheduled in March and April were rescheduled to either February or later in the season to accommodate the rescheduled games.

==== Other ====
- The January 29 game between the Seattle Kraken and the New York Islanders was postponed due to the January 2022 North American blizzard. The game was rescheduled to February 2.
- The April 13 game between the Seattle Kraken and the Winnipeg Jets was postponed due to the expected extreme weather conditions in Winnipeg. The game was rescheduled to May 1.

=== Olympics ===
The collective bargaining agreement (CBA) that the league and the National Hockey League Players' Association (NHLPA) signed on July 10, 2020, included a provision opening the possibility for the NHL to explore participation at the Beijing 2022 and Milan-Cortina 2026 Winter Olympics. By the time the league released the regular schedule on July 22, discussions were still ongoing with the International Olympic Committee on sending players to the 2022 Winter Olympics, particularly in regards to health protocols and insurance issues. Two working schedules were thus created that were not released to the public, one with an Olympics break and one without. The schedule released on July 22 included a break for the Games from February 7 to 22, with the intention that the other schedule without the Olympics break would be used instead if the league and the IOC could not reach a deal, and some teams would have to reschedule as many as 16 home dates.

On September 3, 2021, a deal was officially reached to send players to the Olympics, with an opt-out clause should COVID-19 health conditions worsen. On December 22, the NHL and NHLPA announced that it would opt out of sending its players to the Olympics, nor schedule a break in the season, citing the ongoing COVID-19 issues within the league and the "profound disruption" to the schedule that came as a result. The NHL then used the Winter Olympics' window to reschedule postponed games.

=== All-Star Game ===
The 2022 All-Star Game took place at T-Mobile Arena in Paradise, Nevada, home of the Vegas Golden Knights, on February 5, with the skills competition held on February 4. During seasons when the league sends players to the Olympics (most recently in 2014), the All-Star Game is not normally held. On June 28, 2021, with still no deal signed with the IOC, the league announced that it had decided to schedule an All-Star Game anyway. It was originally scheduled as the last event before the Olympic break, and the NHL had reportedly chosen to host it on the west coast to ease travel to Beijing afterward.

== Standings ==
=== Eastern Conference ===
Top 3 (Metropolitan Division)
Pos	Team	GP	W	L	OTL	RW	GF	GA	GD	Pts
1	y – Carolina Hurricanes	82	54	20	8	47	278	202	+76	116
2	x – New York Rangers	82	52	24	6	44	254	207	+47	110
3	x – Pittsburgh Penguins	82	46	25	11	37	272	229	+43	103

Source: National Hockey League
Rules for classification: 1) Fewer number of games played (GP, only during regular season); 2) Greater number of regulation wins (RW); 3) Greater number of wins in regulation and overtime, excluding shootout wins (ROW); 4) Greater number of total wins, including shootouts (W); 5) Greater number of points earned in head-to-head play; if teams played an uneven number of head-to-head games, the result of the first game on the home ice of the team with the extra home game is discarded; 6) Greater goal differential (GD); 7) Greater number of goals scored (GF)
x – Clinched playoff spot; y – Clinched division

Top 3 (Atlantic Division)
Pos	Team	GP	W	L	OTL	RW	GF	GA	GD	Pts
1	p – Florida Panthers	82	58	18	6	42	340	246	+94	122
2	x – Toronto Maple Leafs	82	54	21	7	45	315	253	+62	115
3	x – Tampa Bay Lightning	82	51	23	8	39	287	233	+54	110

Source: National Hockey League
Rules for classification: 1) Fewer number of games played (GP, only during regular season); 2) Greater number of regulation wins (RW); 3) Greater number of wins in regulation and overtime, excluding shootout wins (ROW); 4) Greater number of total wins, including shootouts (W); 5) Greater number of points earned in head-to-head play; if teams played an uneven number of head-to-head games, the result of the first game on the home ice of the team with the extra home game is discarded; 6) Greater goal differential (GD); 7) Greater number of goals scored (GF)
p – Clinched Presidents' Trophy; x – Clinched playoff spot

Eastern Conference Wild Card
Pos	Div	Team	GP	W	L	OTL	RW	GF	GA	GD	Pts
1	AT	x – Boston Bruins	82	51	26	5	40	255	220	+35	107
2	ME	x – Washington Capitals	82	44	26	12	35	275	245	+30	100
3	ME	New York Islanders	82	37	35	10	34	231	237	−6	84
4	ME	Columbus Blue Jackets	82	37	38	7	26	262	300	−38	81
5	AT	Buffalo Sabres	82	32	39	11	25	232	290	−58	75
6	AT	Detroit Red Wings	82	32	40	10	21	230	312	−82	74
7	AT	Ottawa Senators	82	33	42	7	26	227	266	−39	73
8	ME	New Jersey Devils	82	27	46	9	19	248	307	−59	63
9	ME	Philadelphia Flyers	82	25	46	11	20	211	298	−87	61
10	AT	Montreal Canadiens	82	22	49	11	16	221	319	−98	55

Source: National Hockey League
Rules for classification: 1) Fewer number of games played (GP, only during regular season); 2) Greater number of regulation wins (RW); 3) Greater number of wins in regulation and overtime, excluding shootout wins (ROW); 4) Greater number of total wins, including shootouts (W); 5) Greater number of points earned in head-to-head play; if teams played an uneven number of head-to-head games, the result of the first game on the home ice of the team with the extra home game is discarded; 6) Greater goal differential (GD); 7) Greater number of goals scored (GF)
x – Clinched playoff spot

=== Western Conference ===
Top 3 (Central Division)
Pos	Team	GP	W	L	OTL	RW	GF	GA	GD	Pts
1	z – Colorado Avalanche	82	56	19	7	46	312	234	+78	119
2	x – Minnesota Wild	82	53	22	7	37	310	253	+57	113
3	x – St. Louis Blues	82	49	22	11	43	311	242	+69	109

Source: National Hockey League
Rules for classification: 1) Fewer number of games played (GP, only during regular season); 2) Greater number of regulation wins (RW); 3) Greater number of wins in regulation and overtime, excluding shootout wins (ROW); 4) Greater number of total wins, including shootouts (W); 5) Greater number of points earned in head-to-head play; if teams played an uneven number of head-to-head games, the result of the first game on the home ice of the team with the extra home game is discarded; 6) Greater goal differential (GD); 7) Greater number of goals scored (GF)
x – Clinched playoff spot; z – Clinched conference

Top 3 (Pacific Division)
Pos	Team	GP	W	L	OTL	RW	GF	GA	GD	Pts
1	y – Calgary Flames	82	50	21	11	44	293	208	+85	111
2	x – Edmonton Oilers	82	49	27	6	38	290	252	+38	104
3	x – Los Angeles Kings	82	44	27	11	35	239	236	+3	99

Source: National Hockey League
Rules for classification: 1) Fewer number of games played (GP, only during regular season); 2) Greater number of regulation wins (RW); 3) Greater number of wins in regulation and overtime, excluding shootout wins (ROW); 4) Greater number of total wins, including shootouts (W); 5) Greater number of points earned in head-to-head play; if teams played an uneven number of head-to-head games, the result of the first game on the home ice of the team with the extra home game is discarded; 6) Greater goal differential (GD); 7) Greater number of goals scored (GF)
x – Clinched playoff spot; y – Clinched division

Western Conference Wild Card
Pos	Div	Team	GP	W	L	OTL	RW	GF	GA	GD	Pts
1	CE	x – Dallas Stars	82	46	30	6	31	238	246	−8	98
2	CE	x – Nashville Predators	82	45	30	7	35	266	252	+14	97
3	PA	Vegas Golden Knights	82	43	31	8	34	266	248	+18	94
4	PA	Vancouver Canucks	82	40	30	12	32	249	236	+13	92
5	CE	Winnipeg Jets	82	39	32	11	32	252	257	−5	89
6	PA	San Jose Sharks	82	32	37	13	22	214	264	−50	77
7	PA	Anaheim Ducks	82	31	37	14	22	232	271	−39	76
8	CE	Chicago Blackhawks	82	28	42	12	16	219	291	−72	68
9	PA	Seattle Kraken	82	27	49	6	23	216	285	−69	60
10	CE	Arizona Coyotes	82	25	50	7	18	207	313	−106	57

Source: National Hockey League
Rules for classification: 1) Fewer number of games played (GP, only during regular season); 2) Greater number of regulation wins (RW); 3) Greater number of wins in regulation and overtime, excluding shootout wins (ROW); 4) Greater number of total wins, including shootouts (W); 5) Greater number of points earned in head-to-head play; if teams played an uneven number of head-to-head games, the result of the first game on the home ice of the team with the extra home game is discarded; 6) Greater goal differential (GD); 7) Greater number of goals scored (GF)
x – Clinched playoff spot

== Playoffs ==
=== Bracket ===
In each round, teams compete in a best-of-seven series following a 2–2–1–1–1 format (scores in the bracket indicate the number of games won in each best-of-seven series). The team with home ice advantage plays at home for games one and two (and games five and seven, if necessary), and the other team is at home for games three and four (and game six, if necessary). The top three teams in each division make the playoffs, along with two wild cards in each conference, for a total of eight teams from each conference.

In the First Round, the lower seeded wild card in each conference played against the division winner with the best record while the other wild card played against the other division winner, and both wild cards were de facto #4 seeds. The other series matched the second and third place teams from the divisions. In the first two rounds, home ice advantage was awarded to the team with the better seed. In the conference finals and Stanley Cup Final, home ice advantage was awarded to the team with the better regular season record.

First round	Second round
A1	Florida	4
WC2	Washington	2
A1	Florida	0
A3	Tampa Bay	4
A2	Toronto	3
A3	Tampa Bay	4
Eastern Conference
M1	Carolina	4
WC1	Boston	3
M1	Carolina	3
M2	NY Rangers	4
M2	NY Rangers	4
M3	Pittsburgh	3
C1	Colorado	4
WC2	Nashville	0
C1	Colorado	4
C3	St. Louis	2
C2	Minnesota	2
C3	St. Louis	4
Western Conference
P1	Calgary	4
WC1	Dallas	3
P1	Calgary	1
P2	Edmonton	4
P2	Edmonton	4
P3	Los Angeles	3

Conference finals
A3	Tampa Bay	4
M2	NY Rangers	2
C1	Colorado	4
P2	Edmonton	0

Stanley Cup Final
A3	Tampa Bay	2
C1	Colorado	4

== Statistics ==
=== Scoring leaders ===
The following players led the league in regular season points at the completion of games played on April 29, 2022.

Player	Team	GP	G	A	Pts	+/–	PIM
Connor McDavid	Edmonton Oilers	80	44	79	123	+28	45
Johnny Gaudreau	Calgary Flames	82	40	75	115	+64	26
Jonathan Huberdeau	Florida Panthers	80	30	85	115	+35	54
Leon Draisaitl	Edmonton Oilers	80	55	55	110	+17	40
Kirill Kaprizov	Minnesota Wild	81	47	61	108	+27	34
Auston Matthews	Toronto Maple Leafs	73	60	46	106	+20	18
Steven Stamkos	Tampa Bay Lightning	81	42	64	106	+24	36
Matthew Tkachuk	Calgary Flames	82	42	62	104	+57	68
J. T. Miller	Vancouver Canucks	80	32	67	99	+15	47
Mitch Marner	Toronto Maple Leafs	72	35	62	97	+23	16

Nashville Predators player Roman Josi, ranked eleventh in scoring with 96 points, became the NHL's highest-scoring defenseman in 29 years, since Phil Housley scored 97 points with the Winnipeg Jets in 1992–93. Auston Matthews became only the third player in 25 years to score 60 or more goals, joining Alexander Ovechkin (65 goals with Washington Capitals in 2007–08) and Steven Stamkos (60 goals with Tampa Bay Lightning in 2011–12).

=== Leading goaltenders ===
The following goaltenders led the league in regular season goals against average at the completion of games played on April 29, 2022, while playing at least 1,920 minutes.

Player	Team	GP	TOI	W	L	OTL	GA	SO	SV%	GAA
Igor Shesterkin	New York Rangers	53	3,070:32	36	13	4	106	6	.935	2.07
Frederik Andersen	Carolina Hurricanes	52	3,070:53	35	14	3	111	4	.922	2.17
Jacob Markstrom	Calgary Flames	63	3,695:50	37	15	9	137	9	.922	2.22
Ilya Sorokin	New York Islanders	52	3,072:17	26	18	8	123	7	.925	2.40
Jeremy Swayman	Boston Bruins	41	2,390:14	23	14	3	96	3	.914	2.41
Tristan Jarry	Pittsburgh Penguins	58	3,415:11	34	18	6	138	4	.919	2.42
Linus Ullmark	Boston Bruins	41	2,330:26	26	10	2	95	1	.917	2.45
Andrei Vasilevskiy	Tampa Bay Lightning	63	3,760:45	39	18	5	156	2	.916	2.49
Jake Oettinger	Dallas Stars	48	2,707:36	30	15	1	114	1	.914	2.53
Darcy Kuemper	Colorado Avalanche	57	3,258:45	37	12	4	138	5	.921	2.54

== NHL awards ==
Voting concluded immediately after the end of the regular season. Statistics-based awards such as the Art Ross Trophy, Maurice "Rocket" Richard Trophy, William M. Jennings Trophy and the Presidents' Trophy are announced at the end of the regular season. The Stanley Cup and the Conn Smythe Trophy are presented at the end of the Stanley Cup Final.

The NHL announced the return of the NHL Awards ceremony which took place on June 21. However, only the Calder, Hart, Norris, Vezina, and Lindsay awards were presented. The other major awards were presented during the conference finals. The Jim Gregory General Manager of the Year Award was awarded during the 2022 NHL entry draft.

2021–22 NHL awards
Award	Recipient(s)	Runner(s)-up/Finalists
Presidents' Trophy (Best regular-season record)	Florida Panthers	Colorado Avalanche
Prince of Wales Trophy (Eastern Conference playoff champion)	Tampa Bay Lightning	New York Rangers
Clarence S. Campbell Bowl (Western Conference playoff champion)	Colorado Avalanche	Edmonton Oilers
Art Ross Trophy (Player with most points)	Connor McDavid (Edmonton Oilers)	Johnny Gaudreau (Calgary Flames) (Note: Tied with Jonathan Huberdeau of the Florida Panthers but won the tie-breaker by scoring 40 goals. Huberdeau scored 30 goals.)
Bill Masterton Memorial Trophy (Perseverance, sportsmanship, and dedication)	Carey Price (Montreal Canadiens)	Zdeno Chara (New York Islanders); Kevin Hayes (Philadelphia Flyers)
Calder Memorial Trophy (Best first-year player)	Moritz Seider (Detroit Red Wings)	Michael Bunting (Toronto Maple Leafs); Trevor Zegras (Anaheim Ducks)
Conn Smythe Trophy (Most valuable player, playoffs)	Cale Makar (Colorado Avalanche)	Nathan MacKinnon (Colorado Avalanche)
Frank J. Selke Trophy (Defensive forward)	Patrice Bergeron (Boston Bruins)	Aleksander Barkov (Florida Panthers); Elias Lindholm (Calgary Flames)
Hart Memorial Trophy (Most valuable player, regular season)	Auston Matthews (Toronto Maple Leafs)	Connor McDavid (Edmonton Oilers); Igor Shesterkin (New York Rangers)
Jack Adams Award (Best coach)	Darryl Sutter (Calgary Flames)	Andrew Brunette (Florida Panthers); Gerard Gallant (New York Rangers)
James Norris Memorial Trophy (Best defenseman)	Cale Makar (Colorado Avalanche)	Victor Hedman (Tampa Bay Lightning); Roman Josi (Nashville Predators)
King Clancy Memorial Trophy (Leadership and humanitarian contribution)	P. K. Subban (New Jersey Devils)	Ryan Getzlaf (Anaheim Ducks); Darnell Nurse (Edmonton Oilers)
Lady Byng Memorial Trophy (Sportsmanship and excellence)	Kyle Connor (Winnipeg Jets)	Jaccob Slavin (Carolina Hurricanes); Jared Spurgeon (Minnesota Wild)
Ted Lindsay Award (Outstanding player)	Auston Matthews (Toronto Maple Leafs)	Roman Josi (Nashville Predators); Connor McDavid (Edmonton Oilers)
Mark Messier Leadership Award (Leadership and community activities)	Anze Kopitar (Los Angeles Kings)	N/A
Maurice "Rocket" Richard Trophy (Top goal-scorer)	Auston Matthews (Toronto Maple Leafs)	Leon Draisaitl (Edmonton Oilers)
Jim Gregory General Manager of the Year Award (Top general manager)	Joe Sakic (Colorado Avalanche)	Julien BriseBois (Tampa Bay Lightning); Chris Drury (New York Rangers)
Vezina Trophy (Best goaltender)	Igor Shesterkin (New York Rangers)	Jacob Markstrom (Calgary Flames); Juuse Saros (Nashville Predators)
William M. Jennings Trophy (Goaltender(s) of team with fewest goals against)	Frederik Andersen and Antti Raanta (Carolina Hurricanes)	Alexandar Georgiev and Igor Shesterkin (New York Rangers)

=== All-Star teams ===
Position	First Team	Second Team	Position	All-Rookie
G	Igor Shesterkin, New York Rangers	Jacob Markstrom, Calgary Flames	G	Jeremy Swayman, Boston Bruins
D	Roman Josi, Nashville Predators	Victor Hedman, Tampa Bay Lightning	D	Alexandre Carrier, Nashville Predators
D	Cale Makar, Colorado Avalanche	Charlie McAvoy, Boston Bruins	D	Moritz Seider, Detroit Red Wings
C	Auston Matthews, Toronto Maple Leafs	Connor McDavid, Edmonton Oilers	F	Michael Bunting, Toronto Maple Leafs
RW	Mitch Marner, Toronto Maple Leafs	Matthew Tkachuk, Calgary Flames	F	Lucas Raymond, Detroit Red Wings
LW	Johnny Gaudreau, Calgary Flames	Jonathan Huberdeau, Florida Panthers	F	Trevor Zegras, Anaheim Ducks

== Uniforms ==
=== League changes ===
- The 2021–22 season was the first for Adidas' new Primegreen jerseys across the league; the new line is intended to be more environmentally-friendly, being manufactured with a minimum of 50 percent of recycled materials. These jerseys were used in-game and sold commercially.

=== Wholesale team changes ===
- The Arizona Coyotes changed their road uniform to the original Kachina design from 1996 to 2003, replacing the road uniform they wore from 2015.
- The Los Angeles Kings changed their alternate uniform to a modernized white version of the Wayne Gretzky-era uniforms they wore from 1988 to 1998. This set replaced the silver alternate uniforms they wore from 2016.
- The New Jersey Devils unveiled their first full-fledged alternate uniform, (Note: The Devils have worn their classic red and green uniforms since 2010, but not as full-time alternate uniforms.) featuring a black base with white stripes and red accents. The uniform was designed by Devils legend Martin Brodeur and was largely influenced by the history of ice hockey in New Jersey.
- The Pittsburgh Penguins changed their alternate uniform to a modernized version of the black "PITTSBURGH" diagonal uniforms worn from 1992 to 1997, similar to the previous season's white Reverse Retro uniforms. The uniform replaces the yellow alternate uniforms worn from 2018 onward.
- For its inaugural season, the Seattle Kraken wore home deep sea blue and road white uniforms with ice blue, boundless blue, shadow blue and red accents.
- The Toronto Maple Leafs unveiled a reversible alternate uniform, a first in North American professional sports. The primarily black uniform featured the traditional Maple Leafs logo and blue accents in front, while the reverse side has Justin Bieber's drew house insignia, modified inside a yellow Maple Leafs logo.
- The Winnipeg Jets changed their alternate uniform to the throwback design they wore in the 2019 Heritage Classic, replacing the aviator blue script uniform they wore from 2018.

== Milestones ==
=== First games ===
The following is a list of notable players who played their first NHL game during the 2021–22 season, listed with their first team.

Player	Team	Notability
Matty Beniers	Seattle Kraken	2022–23 Calder Memorial Trophy winner, one-time NHL All-Star, NHL All-Rookie Team selection
Connor Ingram	Nashville Predators	Bill Masterton Memorial Trophy winner
Owen Power	Buffalo Sabres	First overall pick in the 2021 draft, NHL All-Rookie Team selection
Moritz Seider	Detroit Red Wings	2021–22 Calder Memorial Trophy winner, NHL All-Rookie Team selection

=== Last games ===
The following is a list of players of note who played their last NHL game in 2021–22, listed with their team:

Player	Team	Notability
Dustin Brown	Los Angeles Kings	Over 1,200 games played, NHL Foundation Player Award winner, Mark Messier Leadership Award winner, one-time NHL All-Star
Zdeno Chara	New York Islanders	Hockey Hall of Fame inductee, all-time leader in games played by a defenseman (1,680), James Norris Memorial Trophy winner, Mark Messier Leadership Award winner, seven-time NHL All-Star team selection, six-time NHL All-Star, NHL 2010s All-Decade Team selection, oldest active NHL player at time of retirement (45 years, 42 days), tallest player in NHL history (6 ft 9 in (2.06 m))
Ryan Getzlaf	Anaheim Ducks	Over 1,100 games played, one-time NHL All-Star team selection, three-time NHL All-Star
Andy Greene	New York Islanders	Over 1,000 games played
Duncan Keith	Edmonton Oilers	Hockey Hall of Fame inductee, over 1,200 games played, two-time James Norris Memorial Trophy winner, Conn Smythe Trophy winner, three-time NHL All-Star team selection, four-time NHL All-Star, 100 Greatest NHL Players, NHL 2010s All-Decade Team
Andrew Ladd	Arizona Coyotes	Over 1,000 games played
Carey Price	Montreal Canadiens	Hockey Hall of Fame inductee, Hart Memorial Trophy winner, Ted Lindsay Award winner, Vezina Trophy winner, William M. Jennings Trophy winner, Bill Masterton Memorial Trophy winner, one-time NHL All-Star team selection, seven-time NHL All-Star, NHL All-Rookie Team selection, over 300 wins
Tuukka Rask	Boston Bruins	Vezina Trophy winner, William M. Jennings Trophy winner, two-time NHL All-Star team selection, two-time NHL All-Star, over 300 wins
Cory Schneider	New York Islanders	William M. Jennings Trophy winner, one-time NHL All-Star
Jason Spezza	Toronto Maple Leafs	Over 1,200 games played, two-time NHL All-Star
P. K. Subban	New Jersey Devils	James Norris Memorial Trophy winner, King Clancy Memorial Trophy winner, three-time NHL All-Star team selection, three-time NHL All-Star, NHL All-Rookie Team selection
Joe Thornton	Florida Panthers	Hockey Hall of Fame inductee, over 1,700 games played, Hart Memorial Trophy winner, Art Ross Trophy winner, four-time NHL All-Star team selection, six-time NHL All-Star, last active NHL player to have been born in the 1970s, last active player to have played in the 1990s
Keith Yandle	Philadelphia Flyers	Longest iron man streak of all time at retirement (989 consecutive games), over 1,100 games played, three-time NHL All-Star

=== Major milestones reached ===
- On October 13, 2021, Washington Capitals forward Alexander Ovechkin scored his 732nd goal, surpassing Marcel Dionne for fifth in all-time goals scored.
- On October 13, 2021, Washington Capitals head coach Peter Laviolette surpassed John Tortorella for the most NHL wins by an American-born head coach, with 674 total.
- On October 21, 2021, Florida Panthers goaltender Sergei Bobrovsky recorded his 300th win, becoming the 38th goaltender to reach the mark.
- On November 6, 2021, New York Islanders general manager Lou Lamoriello became the third general manager to reach 1,500 NHL wins (regular season and playoffs).
- On November 15, 2021, New York Islanders defenseman Andy Greene played his 1,000th NHL game, becoming the 358th player to reach the mark.
- On November 16, 2021, Anaheim Ducks forward Ryan Getzlaf recorded his 1,000th NHL point, becoming the 92nd player to reach the mark.
- On November 26, 2021, Tampa Bay Lightning goaltender Andrei Vasilevskiy became the second-fastest goaltender to reach 200 wins, accomplishing the milestone in 318 games.
- On November 27, 2021, Edmonton Oilers defenseman Kris Russell blocked his 1,999th shot, becoming the all-time leader in blocked shots since the statistic began to be tracked; later in the same night, Russell became the first player to block 2,000 shots.
- On November 30, 2021, Dallas Stars head coach Rick Bowness became the first coach in NHL history to reach 2,500 games coached (as head coach or assistant).
- On November 30, 2021, Dallas Stars goaltender Braden Holtby recorded his 293rd win in his 500th game, surpassing Jacques Plante for the most goaltender wins through their first 500 games.
- On December 5, 2021, Winnipeg Jets forward Blake Wheeler played his 1,000th NHL game, becoming the 359th player to reach the mark.
- On December 6, 2021, Arizona Coyotes forward Loui Eriksson played his 1,000th NHL game, becoming the 360th player to reach the mark.
- On December 7, 2021, Chicago Blackhawks goaltender Marc-Andre Fleury played his 900th NHL game, becoming the eighth goaltender to reach the mark.
- On December 9, 2021, Chicago Blackhawks goaltender Marc-Andre Fleury recorded his 500th win, becoming the third goaltender to reach the mark.
- On December 31, 2021, Washington Capitals forward Alexander Ovechkin scored his 275th power play goal, becoming the all-time leader in power play goals, and surpassing the record previously held by Dave Andreychuk.
- On January 6, 2022, Columbus Blue Jackets forward Jakub Voracek played his 1,000th NHL game, becoming the 361st player to reach the mark.
- On January 11, 2022, Pittsburgh Penguins forwards Sidney Crosby and Evgeni Malkin and defenseman Kris Letang played their first game of the season as a trio, setting a new record for most seasons (16) as a trio in NHL history.
- On January 17, 2022, San Jose Sharks forward Timo Meier scored five goals in one game, becoming the 47th player in NHL history to do so.
- On January 23, 2022, Vancouver Canucks head coach Bruce Boudreau became the 29th head coach in NHL history to coach 1,000 games.
- On January 25, 2022, Philadelphia Flyers defenseman Keith Yandle played his 965th consecutive NHL game, setting a new record for consecutive games played, and surpassing the record previously held by Doug Jarvis.
- On January 27, 2022, Los Angeles Kings defenseman Drew Doughty played his 1,000th NHL game, becoming the 362nd player to reach the mark.
- On February 15, 2022, Pittsburgh Penguins forward Sidney Crosby scored his 500th goal, becoming the 46th player to reach the mark.
- On February 15, 2022, Washington Capitals head coach Peter Laviolette became the tenth head coach in NHL history to win 700 games.
- On February 24, 2022, New York Islanders defenseman Zdeno Chara played his 1,652nd NHL game, becoming the all-time leader in games played by a defenseman, and surpassing the record previously held by Chris Chelios.
- On March 1, 2022, Colorado Avalanche defenseman Jack Johnson played his 1,000th NHL game, becoming the 363rd player to reach the mark.
- On March 1, 2022, Vegas Golden Knights head coach Peter DeBoer became the 28th head coach in NHL history to win 500 games.
- On March 5, 2022, Toronto Maple Leafs forward Wayne Simmonds played his 1,000th NHL game, becoming the 364th player to reach the mark.
- On March 5, 2022, Seattle Kraken defenseman Mark Giordano played his 1,000th NHL game, becoming the 365th player to reach the mark.
- On March 8, 2022, Washington Capitals duo Alexander Ovechkin and Nicklas Backstrom played their 1,000th game together, becoming the ninth pair in league history to reach the mark.
- On March 9, 2022, Washington Capitals forward Nicklas Backstrom recorded his 1,000th point, becoming the 93rd player to reach the mark.
- On March 10, 2022, Buffalo Sabres goaltender Craig Anderson recorded his 300th win, becoming the 39th goaltender to reach the mark.
- On March 11, 2022, New York Islanders head coach Barry Trotz became the third head coach in NHL history to win 900 games.
- On March 12, 2022, Detroit Red Wings defenseman Marc Staal played his 1,000th NHL game, becoming the 366th player to reach the mark. Additionally, Staal joined his brothers Eric and Jordan as the first trio of brothers in NHL history to each record 1,000 games played.
- On March 15, 2022, Boston Bruins forward Nick Foligno played his 1,000th NHL game, becoming the 367th player to reach the mark. Additionally, he and his father Mike became the second father-and-son duo in NHL history to each record 1,000 games, after Bobby and Brett Hull.
- On March 17, 2022, Philadelphia Flyers forward Claude Giroux played his 1,000th NHL game, becoming the 368th player to reach the mark.
- On March 31, 2022, Chicago Blackhawks forward Jonathan Toews played his 1,000th NHL game, becoming the 369th player to reach the mark.
- On March 31, 2022, Florida Panthers forward Jonathan Huberdeau recorded his 71st assist of the season, becoming the all-time single-season leader in assists by a left winger, and surpassing the record previously held by Joe Juneau.
- On April 7, 2022, Toronto Maple Leafs forward Auston Matthews scored his 56th goal of the season, setting a new single-season record for goals scored by a United States-born player, and surpassing the record previously held by Jimmy Carson and Kevin Stevens.
- On April 20, 2022, Washington Capitals forward Alexander Ovechkin scored his 50th goal of the season, becoming the third player to do so nine times, tying Wayne Gretzky and Mike Bossy for having the most 50-goal seasons in NHL history. He also became the oldest player to record a 50-goal season at 36 years and 215 days of age, surpassing the record previously held by Johnny Bucyk.
- On April 20, 2022, Arizona Coyotes forward Andrew Ladd played his 1,000th NHL game, becoming the 370th player to reach the mark.
- On April 24, 2022, the Eastern Conference became the first conference to have eight teams reach 100 points in the same season.
- On April 26, 2022, Toronto Maple Leafs forward Auston Matthews scored his 60th goal of the season, becoming the 21st player to reach the mark, and accomplishing the 40th 60-goal season in NHL history. Matthews additionally became the first United States-born player to do so.
- On May 9, 2022, Pittsburgh Penguins forward Sidney Crosby became the sixth player in league history to score 200 playoff points.
- On May 14, 2022, Edmonton Oilers forward Connor McDavid scored two points in game 7 of the Oilers' first-round series against the Los Angeles Kings, becoming the second player in NHL history to record six multi-point games in a single playoff series, and first since Rick Middleton did so for the Boston Bruins in 1983.

== Broadcast rights ==
=== National ===
==== Canada ====
This was the eighth season of the league's 12-year Canadian national broadcast rights deal with Sportsnet. This includes Sportnet's sub-licensing agreements to air Saturday Hockey Night in Canada (HNIC) games on CBC Television and French-language broadcasts on TVA Sports, and games streamed on Sportsnet Now, CBCSports.ca (for games televised by CBC), or the subscription service NHL Live. This season NHL Live was made available at no extra cost to subscribers of Sportsnet Now+. After a one-year hiatus due to the pandemic, the Hometown Hockey games returned to Sportsnet's schedule, moving to Monday nights. Saturday HNIC games aired across CBC, one or more of the four Sportsnet feeds, Sportsnet One, Sportsnet 360, or Citytv; decisions on network assignments were made on a week-by-week basis, and select HNIC games were simulcast on multiple networks.

==== United States ====
The 2021–22 season was the first of the NHL's new national media rights agreements in the United States, following the expiration of the league's contract with NBC Sports after the previous season. In negotiating its media rights, the NHL aimed to surpass the US$2 billion total that NBC paid over the life of their 2011–21 contract. The league explored splitting its media rights between multiple broadcasters, and over-the-top services (such as DAZN, ESPN+, and Peacock).

On March 10, 2021, the NHL announced that ESPN/ABC would serve as one of the new rightsholders under a seven-year contract, marking the network's return to NHL broadcasting for the first time since the 2003–04 season. On April 27, 2021, the NHL announced that Turner Sports would serve as the second rightsholder. The structure of the two new contracts resemble ESPN and TNT's broadcast rights to the NBA, in which they also split national coverage.

ESPN's contract allows at least 25 exclusive games per season on ABC or ESPN, 75 exclusive games streamed on ESPN+ (also simulcast on Hulu), exclusive rights to the opening night games, the All-Star Game, and other "special events". ESPN2 and other ESPN networks would also be used as overflow channels. NHL.tv, the NHL's digital out-of-market package, was discontinued in the United States, with all out-of-market games moved to ESPN+, at no extra cost to subscribers. Most of ESPN+'s 75-game slate in 2021–22 took place on Tuesdays and Thursdays, with a select number of games on Fridays. ESPN's 2021–22 schedule included four Tuesday night games in October, six Thursday night games in January, February and March, and eight Tuesday or Thursday night games in April. ABC's 2021–22 schedule included the Thanksgiving Showdown on November 26, the All-Star Game, and nine ABC Hockey Saturday games during the later months of the regular season (one of which airing in primetime).

Turner's contract includes exclusive rights to up to 72 exclusive games per-season, the Winter Classic, and extended highlights on Turner's Bleacher Report website. Games primarily air on TNT, with sister networks TBS and TruTV used as overflow channels. The agreement also included the option to stream its games on HBO Max, but TNT eventually chose not to do so until the 2023–24 NHL season. For the 2021–22 season, TNT aired 50 games, primarily on Wednesday nights (with 15 doubleheaders), seven weeks of games on Sundays in March and April 2022, and all three outdoor games. Due to TNT's prior commitments to air AEW Dynamite, the network only aired a single, west coast game on Wednesday nights from October 27 through December 29, after which Dynamite moved to TBS beginning January 5.

NHL Network continued to nationally televise selected regular season games not broadcast by either ESPN or TNT. NHL Network and TNT games were not be available to stream live on ESPN+, but were available on-demand 24 hours after they end.

ESPN and TNT's coverage of the Stanley Cup playoffs differs from their rights to the NBA playoffs. With ESPN and TNT having designated days of the week in which they televise the first two rounds of the NBA playoffs, the NHL has to work around those dates while ensuring that both broadcasters televise roughly an equal number of first and second round Stanley Cup playoff games. ESPN/ABC then has the first choice of which NHL Conference finals series to air, instead of having the broadcasters alternate annually between Eastern and Western Conference like they do with their NBA Conference finals coverage. And while the NBA Finals is exclusive to ABC, coverage of the Stanley Cup Final instead alternates annually, with ABC airing it during even-numbered years (marking the first time that it was broadcast entirely on American network television; under past contracts, two games aired on cable) and TNT televising it during odd-numbered years (marking the first time since 1994 that national coverage was exclusively on cable television).

With the new U.S. television deals, Sports Business Journal projected that viewership of national games had increased by 18% year-over-year during the regular season. TNT (whose package largely supplanted NBCSN's main package of games) announced a 24% increase in viewership in comparison to cable-televised games during the 2019–20 season, 29% year-over-year in comparison to the shortened 2020–21 season, and a 56% increase in female viewership.

The NHL renewed its national radio agreement with Sports USA, which had taken over NHL Radio the previous season on a one-year deal, for an additional four seasons, taking the company's rights through the 2025 Stanley Cup Final.

=== Local ===
The Buffalo Sabres' radio agreement with Audacy and flagship station 550 WGR expired in the 2021 offseason. On September 1, 2021, the Sabres and Audacy renewed their agreement for an undisclosed number of years, largely because none of the other ownership groups in Buffalo were prepared to take on sports commitments.

The Seattle Kraken's inaugural regional TV broadcaster was Root Sports Northwest. Seattle's radio rights were held by iHeartMedia, with 950 KJR as flagship station, and some games on 96.5 Jack FM KJAQ.

=== Personnel ===
On May 26, 2021, TNT announced that current Rangers radio voice Kenny Albert and current Blackhawks analyst Eddie Olczyk — a pairing carried over from NBC, was their lead broadcast team, and that Turner Sports had signed Oilers and hockey legend Wayne Gretzky to be their lead studio analyst.

TNT announced the rest of their personnel on September 14, naming current Islanders and former NBC play-by-play man Brendan Burke, current Blues analyst Darren Pang, and 3x gold medalist and Hockey Night's Jennifer Botterill as their second broadcast team. Current Flyers lead analyst Keith Jones, also from NBC, served as the lead ice-level reporter, joining Albert and Olczyk on the lead team. Liam McHugh, was named as TNT's lead studio host, continuing that role from NBC, with his colleague Anson Carter, most recent Coyotes head coach Rick Tocchet, and veteran Paul Bissonnette joining Gretzky as studio analysts. NHL Network's Jackie Redmond, and Tarik El-Bashir also appeared as contributors. On September 29, 2021, TNT announced that they added former NHL referee Don Koharski as a rules analyst. TNT later added former Blackhawk Jamal Mayers to their broadcast team as a contributor, Rangers legend Henrik Lundqvist, who also joined MSG, as a studio analyst, former referee Stephane Auger to their team, as another rules analyst, joining Koharski, Nabil Karim, formerly of ESPN, as a fill-in studio host and reporter, Kraken play-by-play announcer John Forslund as a third play-by-play announcer, and Sharks color commentator Bret Hedican as a third color commentator. TNT added a bunch of current players and announcers from Sportsnet, FuboTV, the Flyers, Sharks, Islanders, Vegas Golden Knights, New Jersey Devils, Columbus Blue Jackets, and the Canadian women's national ice hockey team to their Stanley Cup playoff coverage.

ESPN formally confirmed its commentator teams on June 29, 2021. ESPN's #2 college football play-by-play man Sean McDonough would be the network's lead play-by-play announcer; Monday Night Football's Steve Levy would lead studio coverage and contribute to occasional play-by-play commentary. Sportsnet's Leah Hextall and ESPN's #3 college football play-by-play man Bob Wischusen were officially named as play-by-play commentators, as well as SportsCenter's John Buccigross, who also contributed as an alternate studio host, and serve as the host for The Point. ESPN legend Barry Melrose, 6x Cup champion Mark Messier, and 3x Cup champion Chris Chelios were named strictly as studio analysts while TSN's Ray Ferraro, NBC's Brian Boucher, Ryan Callahan, and A. J. Mleczko, NHL Network's Kevin Weekes, Hockey Night/Sportsnet's Cassie Campbell-Pascall, WEPN-FM's Rick DiPietro, and 2018 gold medalist Hilary Knight would contribute as booth, ice-level, and studio analysts. 2016 Isobel Cup champion Blake Bolden was added to join insiders Emily Kaplan and Greg Wyshynski as insiders and rinkside reporters. Linda Cohn continued her duties hosting In the Crease, while also gaining roles as an ice-level reporter and backup studio and game break host. On August 4, 2021, ESPN announced that they added most recent Blue Jackets coach and Stanley Cup winning coach John Tortorella as an extra studio analyst.

On September 16, after ESPN released their slate of games for the 2021-22 season, SportsCenter anchor and ESPN Social host Arda Ocal would announce himself that he too would host select game broadcasts. On October 2, former referee Dave Jackson joined the network as a rules analyst, an NHL first. Early into the 2021-22 season, ESPN added former NBC analyst Dominic Moore, who had hosted the expansion draft with Weekes and ESPN College Football personality Chris Fowler. Laura Rutledge, host of NFL Live and SEC Nation, joined ESPN team for their coverage of the 2022 NHL All-Star Game, in a celebrity interviewer role. After preparing for and playing in the 2022 Winter Olympics, Knight made her ESPN debut on March 10, 2022. Bolden, who has been working as a pro scout for the Los Angeles Kings since 2020, made her official ESPN on-air debut a week later. After the regular season kicked into high gear, Knight and Bolden were the only two who still had to make their on-air debuts with ESPN. Occasionally, other well known ESPN personalities like Jeremy Schaap, Kevin Connors, Michael Eaves, and Max McGee were added in fill-in roles on The Point and In the Crease. Mike Monaco, Roxy Bernstein, and Caley Chelios, daughter of Chris, have also filled in on game coverage. TSN's Gord Miller, Ferraro's broadcast partner for Maple Leafs games on TSN, joined ESPN for the Stanley Cup Playoffs. P. K. Subban joined ESPN for the Playoffs in an expanded role, which includes being a game analyst for select games.

On September 21, 2021, Hockey Night in Canada/Sportsnet lead play-by-play announcer Jim Hughson announced his retirement from broadcasting.

Seattle's inaugural local commentators included play-by-play announcers John Forslund (TV) and Everett Fitzhugh (radio), and analysts J. T. Brown (TV) and Dave Tomlinson (radio). On February 10, it was announced that Fitzhugh joined Brown on the television booth for the Kraken's road game at the Winnipeg Jets on February 17, becoming the first all-black NHL TV broadcast team.

Buffalo play-by-play announcer Rick Jeanneret, after initially stating he expected to retire after his 50th season in 2021, announced he would return for one final season in 2021–22. Jeanneret was assigned to call 20 home games (all on the TV/radio simulcast) during his final season, with Dan Dunleavy working the remaining 62 games (52 on the TV/radio simulcast).

Chicago TV play-by-play announcer Pat Foley announced he would retire at the end of this season. Foley, who has served as the Blackhawks' voice for 39 seasons, called an undisclosed number of games this season. In games where Foley was off TV, either John Wiedeman, Stephen Nelson, Chris Vosters, or Mike Monaco would fill-in. In addition, Colby Cohen replaced Steve Konroyd as the substitute TV analyst for Eddie Olczyk. In games where Wiedeman calls TV games, Alan Fuehring, Jason Ross Jr. and Joey Zakrewski would take over on the radio side. Foley called his final Blackhawks game on April 14, a 3–2 shootout win over the Sharks, after which Vosters assumed the play-by-play duties full-time. On July 18, Olczyk announced his resignation as the Blackhawks' TV analyst after 15 seasons.

On April 28, Winnipeg Jets play-by-play announcer Dennis Beyak announced his retirement. Beyak served as the voice of the Jets since relocating from Atlanta in 2011. He also worked play-by-play duties for the Edmonton Oilers and the Toronto Maple Leafs.

On May 17, New Jersey play-by-play announcer Steve Cangialosi stepped down after 11 seasons.

On September 15, 2022, Montreal Canadiens English-language play-by-play announcer Dan Robertson announced his departure from the team. Robertson had been the team's English radio voice since 2014, and have split television duties with Bryan Mudryk starting in 2018.

== See also ==
- 2021–22 NHL transactions
- List of 2021–22 NHL Three Star Awards
- 2021–22 NHL suspensions and fines
- 2021 in sports
- 2022 in sports
