= Zdeno Chára =

Slovak ice hockey player (born 1977)

- Hockey Hall of Fame, 2025
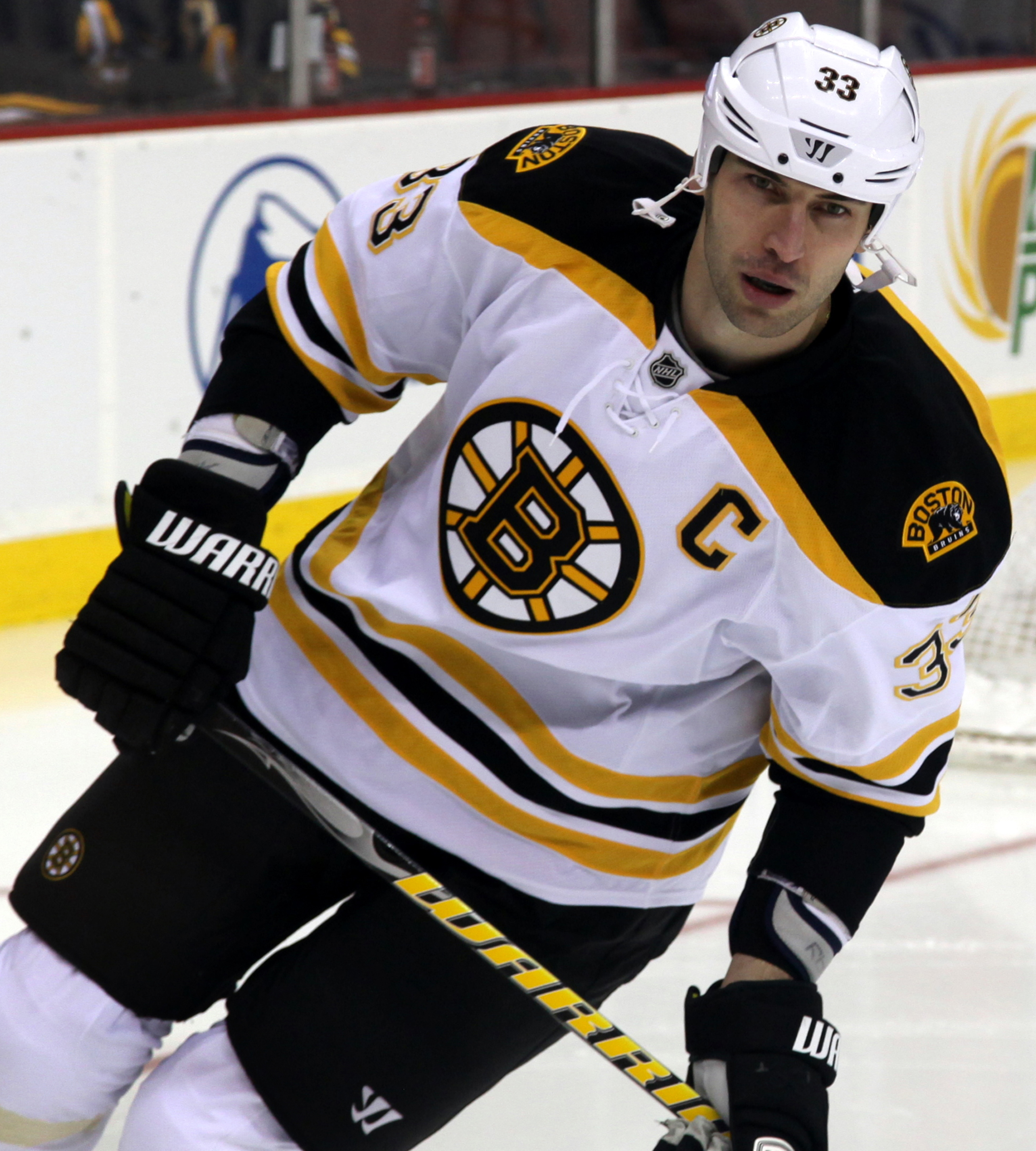
- Chára with the Boston Bruins in January 2012
- Born: 18 March 1977 (age 49) Trenčín, Czechoslovakia
- Height: 6 ft 9 in (206 cm)
- Weight: 250 lb (113 kg; 17 st 12 lb)
- Position: Defence
- Shot: Left
- Played for: Sparta Praha; New York Islanders; Dukla Trenčín; Ottawa Senators; Färjestad BK; Boston Bruins; Lev Praha; Washington Capitals
- National team: Slovakia
- NHL draft: 56th overall, 1996; New York Islanders
- Playing career: 1996–2022

Zdeno Chára (Slovak pronunciation: [ˈzdenɔ ˈxaːra]; born 18 March 1977) is a Slovak former professional ice hockey player. As a defenceman, he played 24 seasons in the National Hockey League (NHL) for the New York Islanders, Ottawa Senators, Boston Bruins, and Washington Capitals between 1997 and 2022. Standing 6 ft 9 in (2.06 m) tall, Chára is the tallest person ever to play in the NHL, earning him the nickname "Big Z". Internationally, he played for the Slovakia men's national team and won two silver medals at the Ice Hockey World Championships. At the 2016 World Cup of Hockey, he won a silver medal playing for Team Europe. In 2025, he was inducted into both the IIHF Hall of Fame and the Hockey Hall of Fame.

Chára served as the Bruins' captain for all of his fourteen seasons with the franchise, from 2006 to 2020. He won the Norris Trophy as the league's best defenceman in 2009, becoming the first Slovak player to do so, and the second European player after Nicklas Lidström. In 2011, 2013 and 2019 Chára captained the Bruins to the Stanley Cup Final, winning in 2011. He is one of five European-born and raised captains to lead his team to the Stanley Cup championship, and the first to be born and trained in the Eastern Bloc. (Note: Nicklas Lidström of the Detroit Red Wings, a native of Sweden, was the first European captain to win the Stanley Cup.) In 2022, Chára played in his 1,652nd NHL game, making him the league's all-time leader in games played by a defenceman. He was the second to last active NHL player to play in the 1990s behind Joe Thornton.

== Early life ==
Zdeno Chára was born on 18 March 1977, in Trenčín, Czechoslovakia, to parents Zdeněk and Veronika. Chára's father was a prominent Greco-Roman wrestler who represented Czechoslovakia at the 1976 Summer Olympics. Chára's initial exposure to organized hockey came with his hometown HC Dukla Trenčín, with whom he played four seasons for during the mid-1990s.

== Playing career ==
=== New York Islanders (1997–2001) ===
After being passed over in the 1995 draft, Chára was drafted in the third round, 56th overall, by the New York Islanders at the 1996 NHL entry draft. He would spend his first season in North America with the Western Hockey League (WHL)'s Prince George Cougars, who subsequently selected Chára in that year's CHL Import Draft. Chára spent four seasons with the Islanders organization, becoming a reliable, stay-at-home defender in a primarily defensive role. He earned a reputation as a tough player to play against – intimidating, physically strong and a punishing hitter who could, on occasion, fight. His physical strength also gave him a very hard slap shot, which seemed to improve each and every season, although Chára was never deployed in an offensive role as an Islander. Chára was traded to the Ottawa Senators during the 2001 NHL entry draft as part of a deal to acquire forward Alexei Yashin. At the time, it was believed the deal would vastly improve the Islanders, who were never a contending team when Chára played there. Chára was part of a package deal that included Bill Muckalt and the second overall pick from that year's draft, which the Senators used to select Jason Spezza. The Islanders initially had a trade in place to send Chára to the Boston Bruins in exchange for Jason Allison, but team ownership nixed the deal because it would have involved Dave Scatchard, who they did not want to trade because they "liked Dave Scatchard because he visited sick kids in the hospital."

=== Ottawa Senators (2001–2006) ===
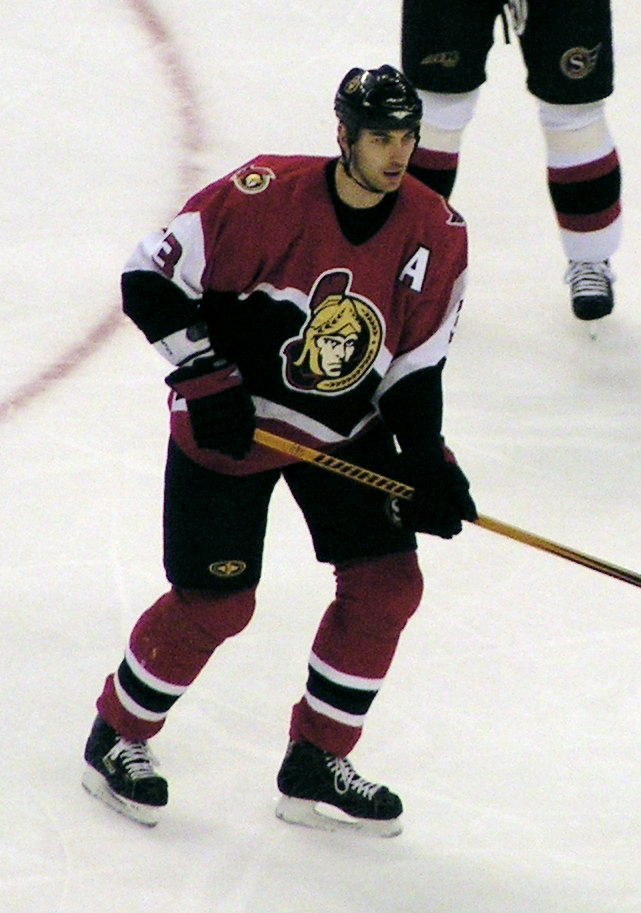
Chára during his tenure with the Ottawa Senators in January 2006

The Senators knew from observation Chára would be a reliable defender, and were also aware he was growing into his body and improving his skills each year. However, Chára grew in ways that exceeded all expectations. In 2001–02, during his first year in Ottawa, he recorded new career highs in goals (10) and points (23) as he turned into a bona fide two-way defenceman. His powerful slapshot continued to improve, and Ottawa began to deploy him on the power play to use it, something the Islanders had rarely done. It resulted in four of Chára's goals being scored with the man advantage that season. The following year, in 2002–03, Chára began to blossom into an elite NHL defenceman. He posted new career highs with 30 assists and 39 points and became one of Ottawa's top two defenders, along with Wade Redden. He also earned his first NHL All-Star Game appearance, where he recorded the second-hardest shot behind Al MacInnis in the Skills Competition.

In 2003–04, Chára posted career bests with 16 goals and 41 points, and recorded the NHL's third highest plus-minus rating, behind Martin St. Louis and Marek Malík, culminating in his first James Norris Memorial Trophy nomination. Although he lost to Scott Niedermayer as the NHL's top defenceman, he joined Niedermayer on the NHL first All-Star team.

After the 2004–05 NHL lockout, in which Chára played in the Swedish Elitserien for Färjestad BK, he matched his previous NHL season's 16-goal total and tallied a career best 43 points, good enough for NHL second All-Star team honours. Following the season, Ottawa was faced with the possible loss of its two top defencemen – Chára and Redden – and finances dictated they could only sign one; the Senators opted for Redden.

As Chára did not come to terms on a new contract with Ottawa, he became an unrestricted free agent at the end of 2005–06. Choosing Redden over Chára proved to be a mistake, as Redden's performance declined whereas Chára became one of the league's top defencemen.

=== Boston Bruins (2006–2020) ===
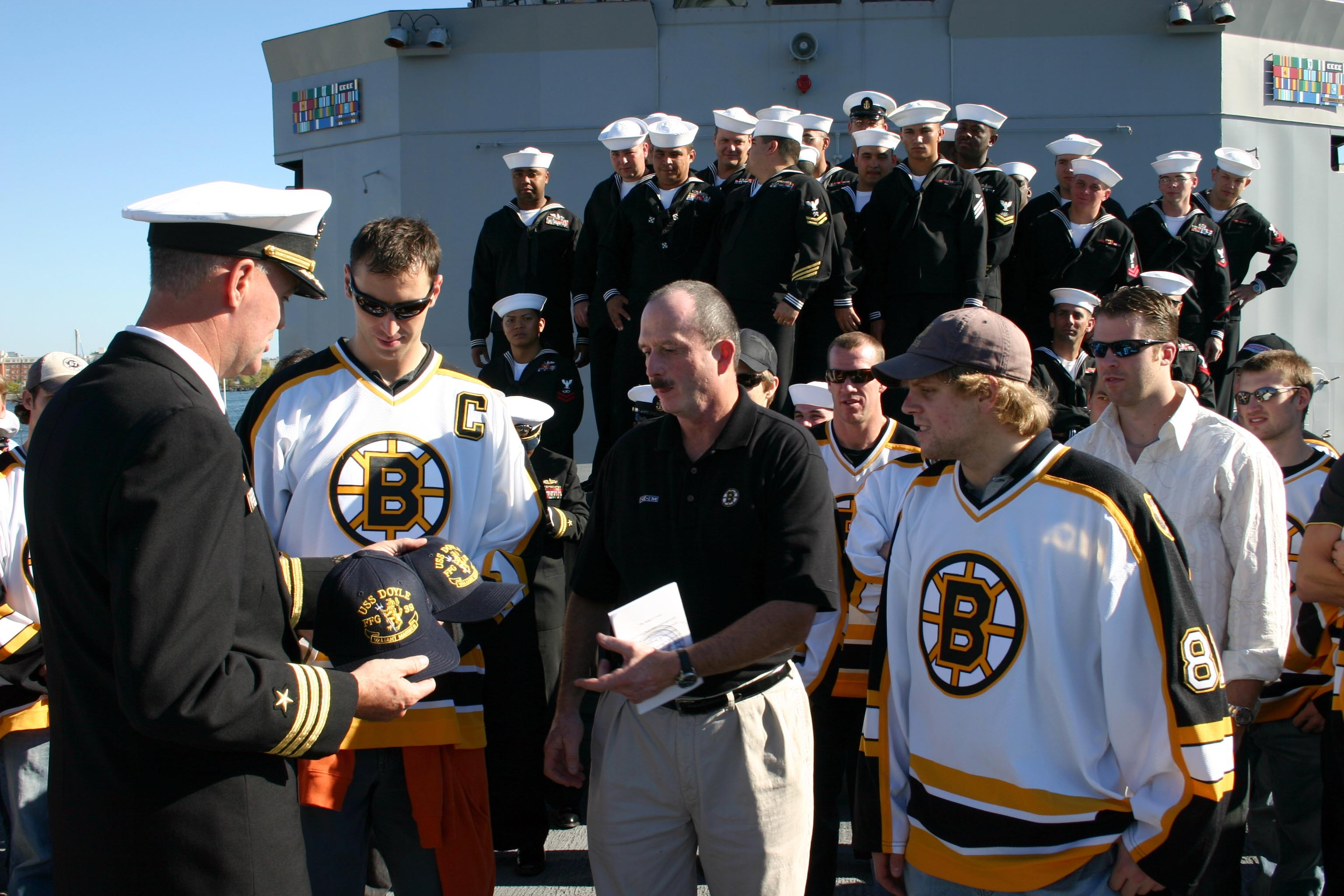
Chára (left), head coach Dave Lewis (center) and Phil Kessel (right) on Columbus Day with the crew of the USS Doyle in 2006

On 1 July 2006, the first day of the free agency period, Chára signed a five-year, $37.5 million contract with the Boston Bruins and was named the team's captain, a role left vacant since Joe Thornton's departure to San Jose during the 2005–06 season. Chára became only the third Slovak-born NHL player to become a team captain, after Peter Šťastný of the Quebec Nordiques and Stan Mikita (co-captain) of the Chicago Blackhawks. Chára was named to the 2007 NHL All-Star Game (his second appearance) in Dallas and scored two goals in a 12–9 Eastern Conference loss. Chára also won the hardest shot segment of the preceding Skills Competition, clocking a shot at 100.4 mph. While his season was a personal success for many of these reasons, the Bruins were in a rebuilding mode at the time, and the signing was questioned throughout the NHL, as Chára posted an uncharacteristic −21 plus-minus rating that season due to the Bruins' struggles. However, his 32 assists were a new career high.

In 2007–08, Chára was voted a starter in the 2008 NHL All-Star Game, the first time in his career he received such All-Star Game honours. He repeated as the winner of the hardest shot competition, recording an even-faster 103.1 mph (166 km/h) on the radar gun. On 8 March 2008, during a game against the Washington Capitals, Chára suffered a torn labrum in his left shoulder. However, after missing five games, he played the remainder of the season, including the 2008 playoffs. Upon a first-round elimination at the hands of the Montreal Canadiens, he underwent a shoulder operation on 29 April. At the end of the season, Chára received his second nomination for the Norris Trophy after tallying a career-high 17 goals, 34 assists and 51 points, marking the fifth-straight season he had either matched or bested his previous season's points total. The Bruins improved tremendously this season, and the critics who had questioned the Bruins' signing of Chára the previous season were largely silenced by his, and the team's, improved play.

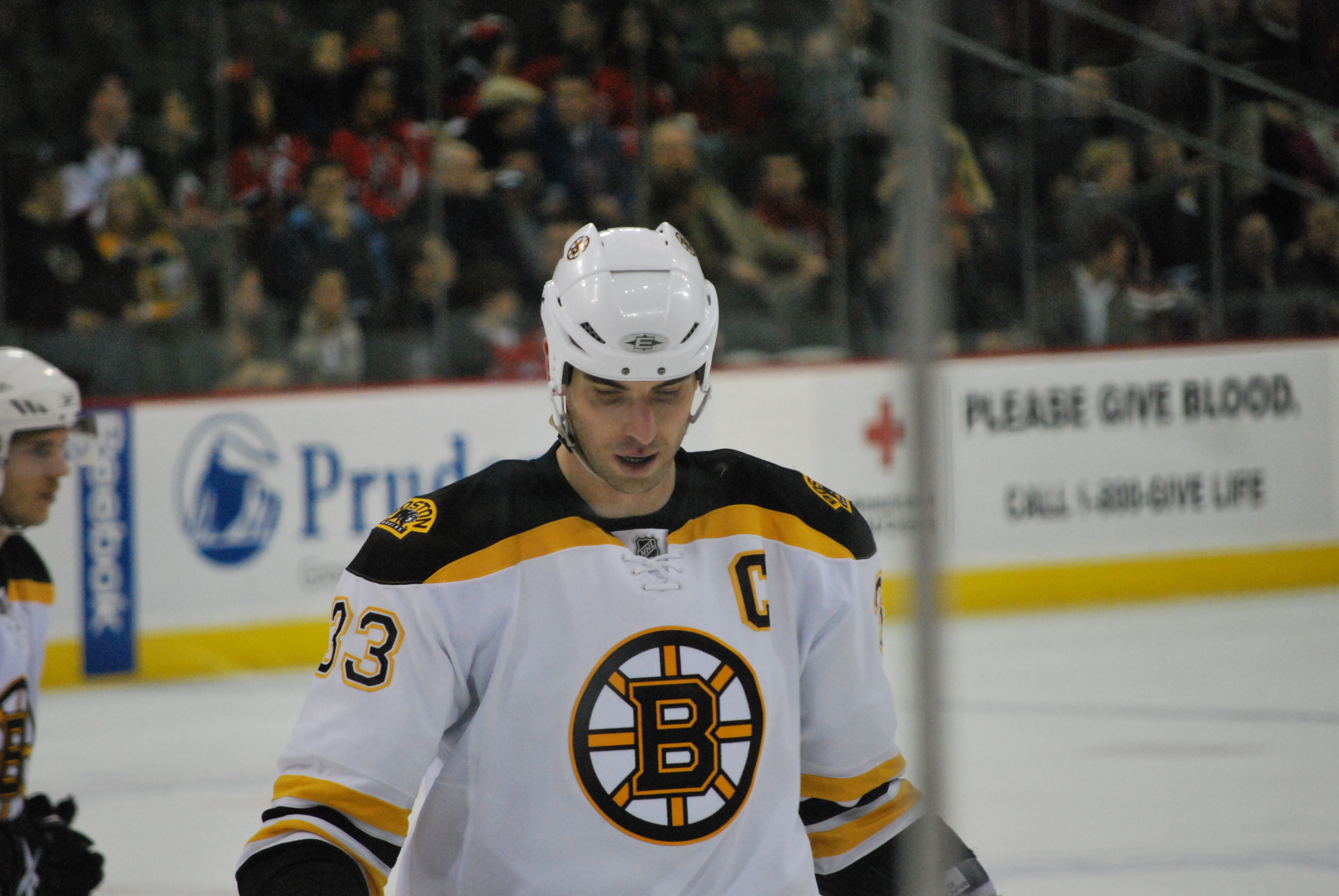
Chára with the Bruins in February 2009

In 2008–09, Chára was named to his fourth All-Star Game. As back-to-back champion of the hardest shot competition, Chára initiated a charity drive among the participants ($1,000 per player) to go to the charity of choice of the competition's winner. The 2009 installation of the event featured additional intrigue, as three players widely considered to possess the hardest shots in the NHL (Chára, Sheldon Souray and Shea Weber) had all been chosen as All-Stars, and therefore would participate in the event. Having raised $24,000 from the six competitors and their respective teams, the NHL and the National Hockey League Players' Association (NHLPA), Chára set a new Skills Competition record with a 105.4 mph (169.7 km/h) slapshot. He donated the winnings to Right to Play, and due to Chára's leading role in fundraising for charity, the hardest shot competition that year was punningly dubbed a "Chara"ty event. The shot passed Al Iafrate's previous record of 105.2 mph (169.3 km/h) from the 1993 competition. During the season, Chára posted a career best 19 goals and eclipsed his career best points total, reaching the 50-point plateau for the second consecutive year with a goal and an assist in his final game of the season. For his efforts, he won his first Norris Trophy as the NHL's best defenceman, edging Mike Green of the Washington Capitals and Nicklas Lidström of the Detroit Red Wings.

Chára would post another standout season in 2009–10, scoring 44 points. His goal total fell to seven from the year before, but his play was as strong as ever, leading the Bruins to lock him up long-term with a contract extension; on 9 October 2010, he re-signed with the Bruins on a seven-year contract.

In 2010–11, Chára's 14 goals and 44 points were another strong campaign, leading to yet another All-Star selection and new heights as his slapshot continued to break records at the 2011 All-Star Game in Raleigh, North Carolina. He eclipsed his own previous record with a shot clocked at 105.9 mph (170.43 km/h). He also achieved a personal milestone that is exceptionally rare for a defenceman; on 17 January 2011, Chára recorded his first career hat-trick against the Carolina Hurricanes in a 7–0 victory. He celebrated the feat by performing retired Slovak NHL star Peter Bondra's celebration, where he mimed throwing a hat into the air. On 8 March 2011, Chára hit and drove Montreal Canadiens forward Max Pacioretty's head directly into an off-ice stanchion at the end of the bench, knocking him unconscious. Pacioretty was taken off the ice on a stretcher. The extent of the injury was revealed the next day to be a non-displaced fracture to the 4th vertebra and a severe concussion. For delivering the hit, Chára received a five-minute major penalty and a game misconduct, and videotape of the play was sent to NHL vice president of hockey operations Mike Murphy for review. However, Murphy decided no further punishment was warranted, calling it a "hockey play". Although a criminal investigation was announced by the Montreal Police Service immediately after the incident, the Crown Prosecutor Office announced on 17 November 2011, that Chára would not be criminally charged. Pacioretty eventually made a full recovery, returning to Montreal the following season. The following season the NHL tested and later mandated a change to its rinks to have a curved glass at the end of the player benches to deflect similar impact. The 2010–11 season culminated in the ultimate glory for Chára, as he captained the Bruins to win the Stanley Cup against the Vancouver Canucks, the Boston team's first Stanley Cup championship win since 1972. In so doing, Chára became the first Slovak to captain a Stanley Cup champion, and only the second European to do so after Nicklas Lidström of Sweden for the Detroit Red Wings. He also became the first player born in a country behind the Iron Curtain to captain a Stanley Cup winner.

At the 2012 All-Star Game's Hardest Shot skill competition, Chára yet again raised his measured hardest slap shot velocity to another record, attaining 108.8 mph (175.1 km/h). Runner-up Shea Weber surpassed Chara's 2011 event record by recording a 106.0 mph (170.6 km/h) blast in the same contest, but Chára's performance ensured he kept his title.

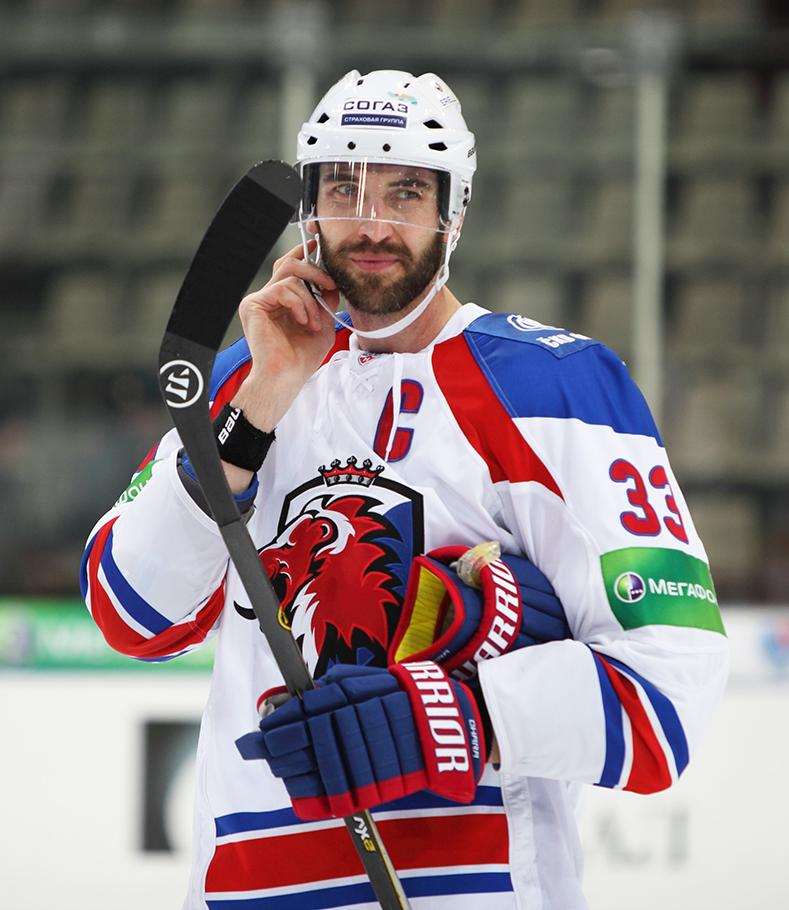
Chára in December 2012 while with Lev Praha of the KHL during the 2012–13 NHL lockout

Chára is widely considered to have the hardest slapshot in the NHL, and quite possibly the world – the Kontinental Hockey League (KHL) claims the world record belongs to Alex Riazantsev at 114.1 mph (183.6 km/h), but due to differences in the mechanics of the KHL competition, the NHL does not recognize this figure. Chára won the hardest shot competition at the All-Star Game Skills Competition five times in a row, in 2007, 2008, 2009, 2011 and 2012 (Note: there was no NHL All-Star Game in 2010, due to NHL player participation in the 2010 Winter Olympics, and also in 2013 as a result of the 2012–13 NHL lockout). Chára played his 1,000th career NHL game on 24 March 2012 against the Los Angeles Kings, and it ended with a 4–2 victory for the Bruins.

During the 2012–13 NHL lockout, Chara agreed to play for Lev Praha of the KHL until NHL play resumed. He returned from the lockout to post another solid season, with 7 goals and 12 assists in the 48-game season. His point totals were down due to some of Boston's struggles down the stretch, particularly on the power play, where Chára only posted one assist all season despite plenty of ice time in man advantage situations. However, he remained solid on defence and a key contributor for the Bruins. In the 2013 playoffs, he was physically dominant and played a key role in leading his team to the Final.

Following the 2013–14 season, Chára was named a finalist for the Norris Trophy. He was nominated along with eventual winner Duncan Keith and Shea Weber. Chára finished runner-up in the voting.

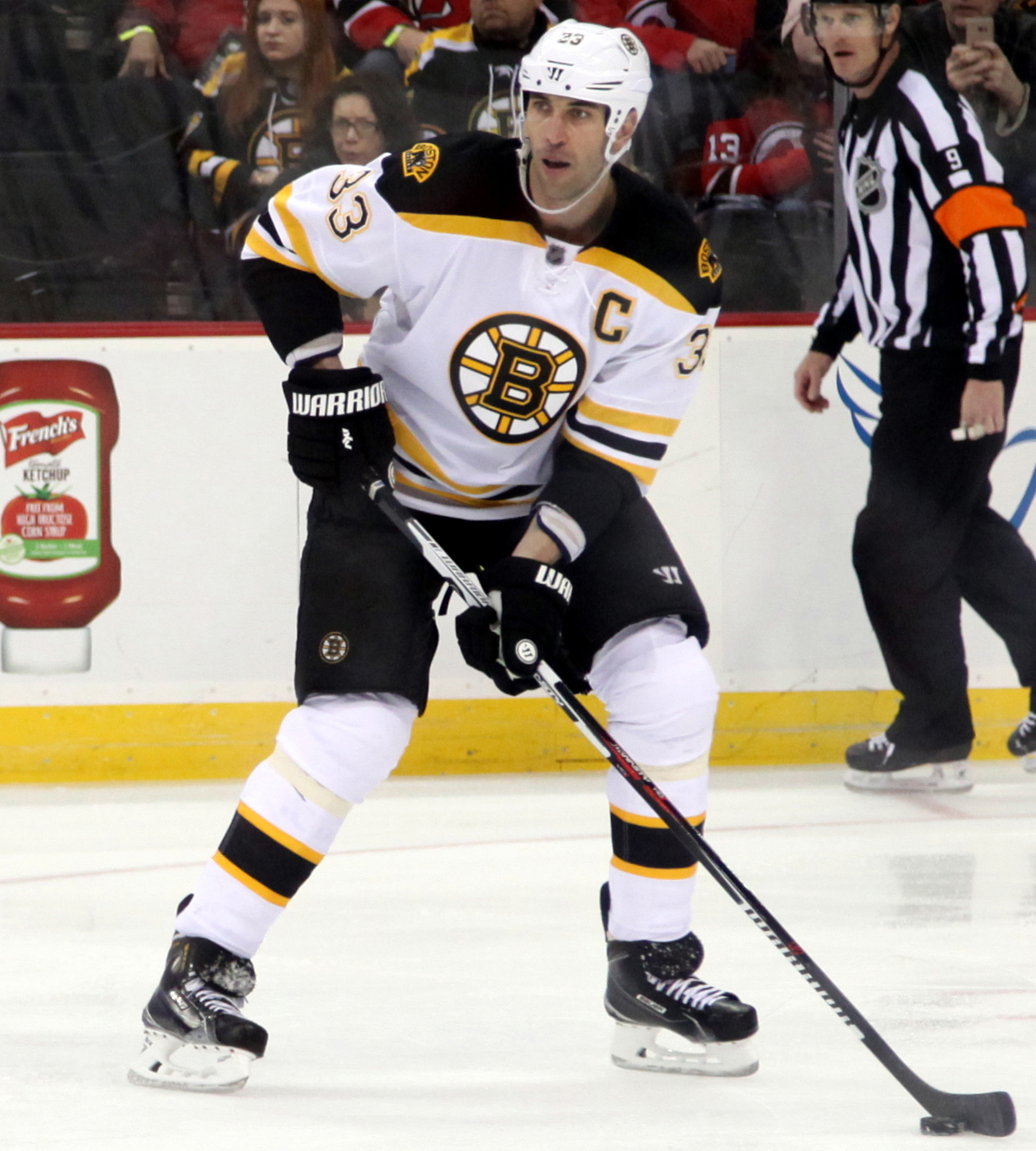
Chára with the Bruins in March 2016

By the time the 2016–17 season had started, Chára was skating as part of the Bruins' top defensive pairing beside 6-foot-5-inch rookie defenceman Brandon Carlo, nearly 20 years younger than him.

A similar "pairing" for Chára occurred as the 2017–18 season got going: the American-born star rookie defenceman Charlie McAvoy had, by mid-November of the new Bruins season, become Chára's latest "regular" defensive partner for the Bruins. By early February 2018, Chára played in his 1,400th NHL game in a 4–1 home ice defeat of the Toronto Maple Leafs, only the 39th player in NHL history to reach the milestone. On 28 March 2018, the Bruins re-signed Chára to a one-year, $5 million contract extension.

On 17 April 2019, in game four of the first round series between the Bruins and Toronto Maple Leafs, Chára became the oldest defenceman in NHL history to score a game-winning goal in the Stanley Cup playoffs. On 9 June 2019, during game six of the 2019 Stanley Cup Final against the St. Louis Blues, Chára scored an empty net goal and as a result became the oldest defenceman in NHL history to score a goal in the Stanley Cup Final.

On 10 July 2019, following the retirement of Matt Cullen, Chára became the oldest active NHL player. On 5 November 2019, during a game at the Bell Centre against the Montreal Canadiens, Chára became the 21st player in NHL history to play 1,500 regular season games.

=== Washington Capitals (2020–2021) ===
On 30 December 2020, Chára signed a one-year, $795,000 contract with the Washington Capitals. He scored his first goal with the team on 28 January 2021, against the New York Islanders.

=== Return to the Islanders and retirement (2021–2022) ===
On 18 September 2021, it was announced that Chára had signed a one-year contract with the New York Islanders. On 24 February 2022, Chára played his 1,652nd NHL game, surpassing Chris Chelios' record of 1,651 games played by a defenceman. At the end of the season, he was a finalist for the Bill Masterton Memorial Trophy, awarded to the player who "best exemplifies the qualities of perseverance, sportsmanship and dedication to hockey".

On 20 September 2022, Chára announced his retirement from professional hockey. He signed a one-day contract with the Boston Bruins to officially retire as a member of the team.

=== Post-retirement ===
On 29 September 2025, Chára rejoined the Boston Bruins once again, now serving as a hockey operations adviser. Some of his responsibilities in this role include strengthening communication between players and the coaching staff, attending practices and home games, and providing off-ice development support for defencemen.

On 6 October, the Bruins announced that they would retire Chára's number 33 on 15 January 2026, becoming the first European to have his number retired by the team.

On August 21, 2026, a farewell game "Zee's Final Shift" was played at Pavol Demitra Ice Stadium in Trenčín. The game was contested between the Boston Bruins Alumni Hockey Team and Team World.

== International play ==
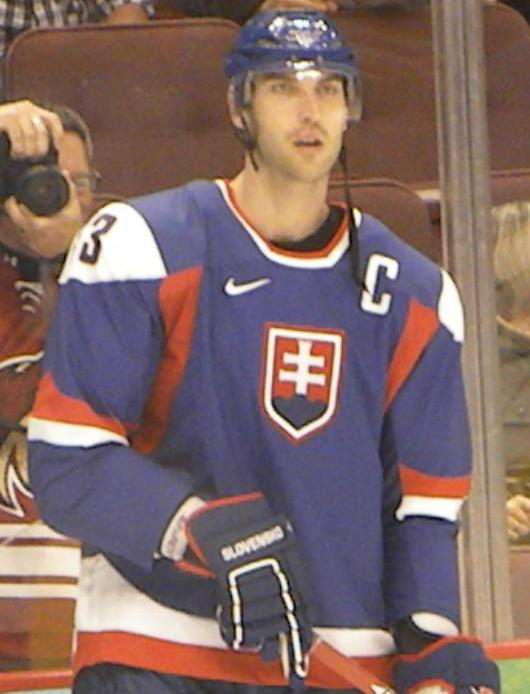
- Chara at the 2010 Winter Olympics

Medal record

Men's ice hockey

Representing Slovakia

World Championships
Silver medal – second place	2000 Russia	
Silver medal – second place	2012 Finland/Sweden	

Chára represented Slovakia in ten international tournaments, having played in the World Championships (1999, 2000, 2001, 2004, 2005, 2007, 2012) and the Winter Olympics (2006, 2010, 2014). He won a World Championship silver medal in 2000, later captaining Slovakia to his second silver medal in 2012. He also competed in the 2004 World Cup of Hockey for Slovakia and the 2016 World Cup of Hockey for Team Europe.

During the 2014 Winter Olympics opening ceremony, Chára served as the flag bearer for Slovakia.

In 2020, Chára was named into the IIHF All-Time Slovakia Team.

== Personal life ==
Before he was drafted into the NHL, Chára's coaches in his native Slovakia attempted to persuade him to play basketball, due to his height. Also as a result of his height, Chára uses 67-inch sticks (four inches longer than NHL regulations), and received a waiver from the NHL to do so.

Chára married his long-time girlfriend Tatiana Biskupicová on 14 July 2007, in a Catholic church in Nemšová, Slovakia. Tatiana gave birth to the couple's first child, daughter Elliz Victoria Chára (Chárová), on 27 April 2009. Their twin boys, Zack and Ben, were born on 7 March 2016. All three of their children were born in Boston.

Chára was one of the first NHL players to endorse You Can Play and acceptance of gay players in professional hockey.

Chára is a polyglot, speaking six languages outside of his native Slovak: Czech, Polish, Swedish, Russian, German, and English. He also has a financial planning diploma from Ottawa's Algonquin College. In early 2015, Chára received a license to sell real estate in Massachusetts.

In 2020 a documentary was released by NESN titled Chára at 1,000 which he won a New England Emmy Award for in 2021 in the Sports One Time Special category.

In 2021, Chára was awarded the Order of Ľudovít Štúr 2nd Class, Slovakia's second-highest state honour. The recognition was for his extraordinary merits in sport and for spreading the good name of his country abroad.

Since retirement, Chára has competed in multiple marathons, triathlons and the Ironman Triathlon. He has completed all six World Marathon Majors: the Boston, New York, London, Berlin, Chicago, and Tokyo marathons.

During game one of the 2024 NBA Finals, the Boston Celtics honoured Chára with the Heroes Among Us award in honour of his community service across New England. The Heroes Among Us award is the Celtics' community outreach award dating back to 1997.

=== Philanthropy ===
For several years, Chára hosted the Big Z Challenge, an annual charity event in Manchester, New Hampshire, that brought Bruins fans and families together in fundraising with games and entertainment. All the proceeds supported pediatric and cancer care improvements at Elliot Health System. Chára is an athletic ambassador for Right To Play. In July 2008, he spent two weeks in Africa, visiting Mozambique in support of the charity, and climbing Mount Kilimanjaro with former NHL player Robyn Regehr.

In 2018, Chára continued an annual Bruins tradition by purchasing $2,000 worth of pies from a local pastry shop and delivering them to multiple Boston-area shelters for Thanksgiving. He also helped raise additional funds through fan participation. Chara also spearheaded a shoe drive with Soles4Souls, personally donating $7,500 worth of New Balance shoes and collecting over 2,000 pairs for underserved communities in Boston and Slovakia, and supported the Bruins' PJ Drive, helping collect a record 21,000 pairs of pajamas for Massachusetts children.

Chára participated in the 2023 Boston Marathon to support the Hoyt Foundation and the Thomas E. Smith Foundation, finishing with a time of 3:38:23. He ran the marathon again in 2024 for the same organizations, nearly eight minutes faster than his previous time finishing with a time of 3:30:52. He joined the Thomas E. Smith Foundation's board of directors in 2025, which gives out the annual $14,000 Zdeno Chara Paralysis Grant to families.

In 2024, Chára volunteered at the annual Special Olympics games in Lexington, participating in running, soccer, and hurdles. In 2025 Chára joined the Bruins alumni team and has since started competing in charity games.

== Career statistics ==
=== Regular season and playoffs ===
			Regular season					Playoffs
Season	Team	League	GP	G	A	Pts	PIM	GP	G	A	Pts	PIM
1994–95	Dukla Trenčín	SVK U18	30	22	22	44	113	—	—	—	—	—
1994–95	Dukla Trenčín	SVK U20	2	0	0	0	0	—	—	—	—	—
1995–96	Dukla Trenčín	SVK U20	22	1	13	14	80	—	—	—	—	—
1995–96	Dukla Trenčín II	SVK.2	5	1	1	2	6	—	—	—	—	—
1995–96	ŠHK 37 Piešťany	SVK.2	10	1	3	4	10	—	—	—	—	—
1995–96	Sparta Praha	CZE U20	15	1	2	3	42	—	—	—	—	—
1995–96	Sparta Praha	ELH	1	0	0	0	0	—	—	—	—	—
1996–97	Prince George Cougars	WHL	49	3	19	22	120	15	1	7	8	45
1997–98	Kentucky Thoroughblades	AHL	48	4	9	13	125	1	0	0	0	4
1997–98	New York Islanders	NHL	25	0	1	1	50	—	—	—	—	—
1998–99	Lowell Lock Monsters	AHL	23	2	2	4	47	—	—	—	—	—
1998–99	New York Islanders	NHL	59	2	6	8	83	—	—	—	—	—
1999–2000	New York Islanders	NHL	65	2	9	11	57	—	—	—	—	—
2000–01	New York Islanders	NHL	82	2	7	9	157	—	—	—	—	—
2001–02	Dukla Trenčín	SVK	8	2	2	4	32	—	—	—	—	—
2001–02	Ottawa Senators	NHL	75	10	13	23	156	10	0	1	1	12
2002–03	Ottawa Senators	NHL	74	9	30	39	116	18	1	6	7	14
2003–04	Ottawa Senators	NHL	79	16	25	41	147	7	1	1	2	8
2004–05	Färjestad BK	SEL	33	10	15	25	132	13	3	5	8	82
2005–06	Ottawa Senators	NHL	71	16	27	43	135	10	1	3	4	23
2006–07	Boston Bruins	NHL	80	11	32	43	100	—	—	—	—	—
2007–08	Boston Bruins	NHL	77	17	34	51	114	7	1	1	2	12
2008–09	Boston Bruins	NHL	80	19	31	50	95	11	1	3	4	12
2009–10	Boston Bruins	NHL	80	7	37	44	87	13	2	5	7	29
2010–11	Boston Bruins	NHL	81	14	30	44	88	24	2	7	9	34
2011–12	Boston Bruins	NHL	79	12	40	52	86	7	1	2	3	8
2012–13	Lev Praha	KHL	25	4	6	10	24	—	—	—	—	—
2012–13	Boston Bruins	NHL	48	7	12	19	70	22	3	12	15	20
2013–14	Boston Bruins	NHL	77	17	23	40	66	12	2	2	4	14
2014–15	Boston Bruins	NHL	63	8	12	20	42	—	—	—	—	—
2015–16	Boston Bruins	NHL	79	9	28	37	71	—	—	—	—	—
2016–17	Boston Bruins	NHL	75	10	19	29	59	6	0	1	1	2
2017–18	Boston Bruins	NHL	73	7	17	24	60	12	1	2	3	4
2018–19	Boston Bruins	NHL	62	5	9	14	57	23	2	4	6	16
2019–20	Boston Bruins	NHL	68	5	9	14	60	13	0	2	2	8
2020–21	Washington Capitals	NHL	55	2	8	10	44	5	0	0	0	2
2021–22	New York Islanders	NHL	72	2	12	14	85	—	—	—	—	—
NHL totals			1,680	209	471	680	2,085	200	18	52	70	218

=== International ===
Year	Team	Event	Result	GP	G	A	Pts	PIM
1999	Slovakia	WC	7th	6	1	0	1	6
2000	Slovakia	WC	2nd place, silver medalist(s)	9	0	0	0	12
2001	Slovakia	WC	7th	7	0	1	1	10
2004	Slovakia	WC	4th	9	2	0	2	2
2004	Slovakia	WCH	7th	4	0	2	2	8
2005	Slovakia	WC	5th	7	0	2	2	2
2006	Slovakia	OG	5th	6	1	1	2	2
2007	Slovakia	WC	6th	7	3	1	4	4
2010	Slovakia	OG	4th	7	0	3	3	6
2012	Slovakia	WC	2nd place, silver medalist(s)	10	2	2	4	4
2014	Slovakia	OG	11th	4	0	1	1	4
2016	Team Europe	WCH	2nd	6	2	0	2	6
Senior totals				82	11	13	24	66

== Awards, honours and records ==
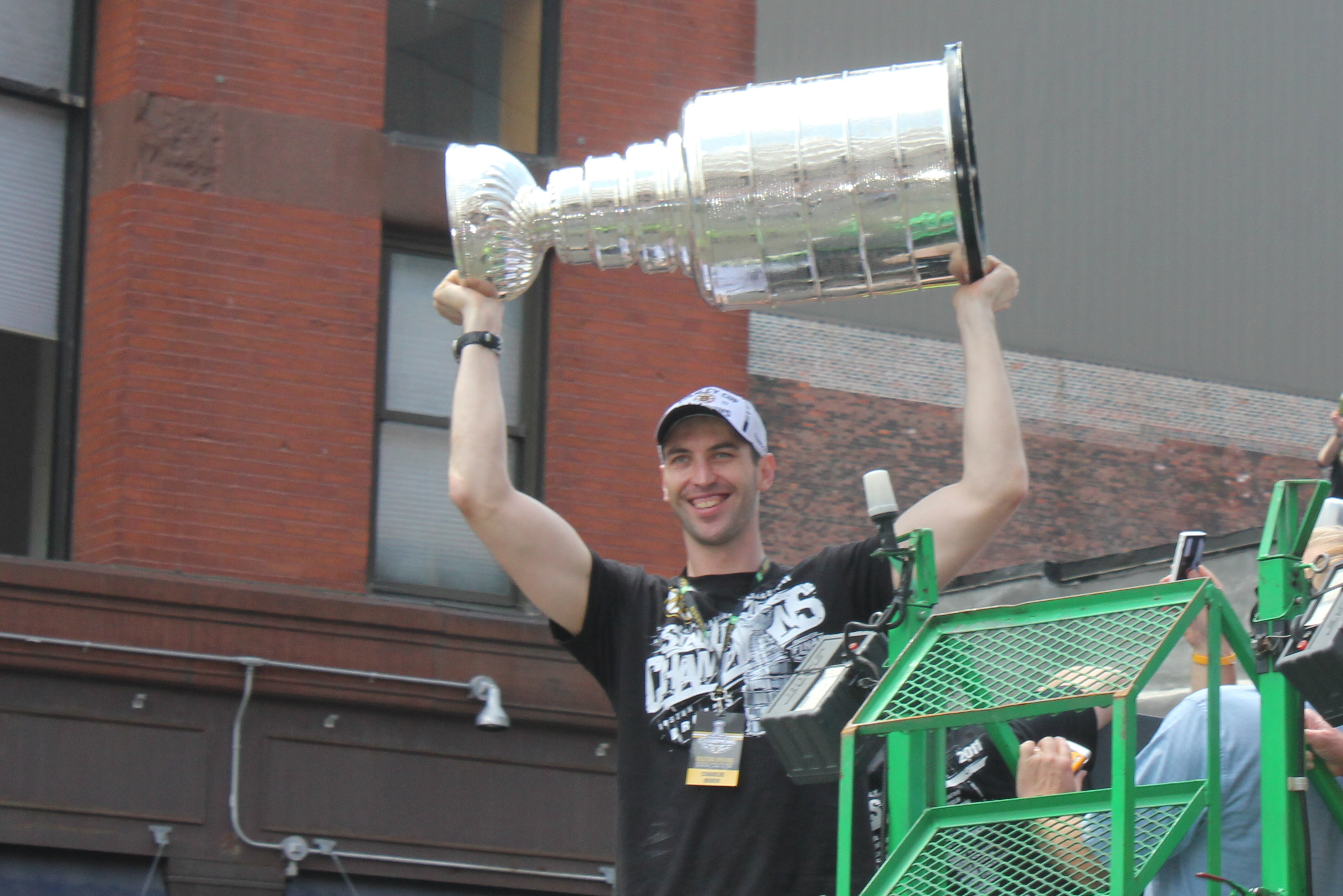
Chára hoisting the Stanley Cup during the Bruins' 2011 victory parade

Award	Year
AHL
AHL All-Star Game	1998
AHL All-rookie team	1998
NHL
NHL All-Star Game	2003, 2007, 2008, 2009, 2011, 2012
NHL First All-Star team	2004, 2009, 2014
NHL Second All-Star team	2006, 2008, 2011, 2012
NHL All-Star Skills Competition hardest shot	2007, 2008, 2009, 2011, 2012
James Norris Memorial Trophy	2009
NHL All-Decade team 2000s	2009
Stanley Cup champion	2011
Mark Messier Leadership Award	2011
NHL All-Decade team 2010s	2020
Hockey Hall of Fame	2025
International
IIHF World Championship All-star team	2004, 2012
IIHF World Championship best defenceman	2012
IIHF All-Time Teams – Slovakia	2020
IIHF Hall of Fame	2025
Slovak Hockey Hall of Fame	2025
Boston Bruins
John P. Bucyk Award	2008, 2019
Bruins Three Stars awards	2009
Eddie Shore Award	2012
Named one of top 100 best Bruins players of all time	2024
Boston Bruins All-Centennial team	2024
#33 jersey number retired	January 15, 2026

- Elected captain of Team Chara in the 2012 National Hockey League All-Star Game.
- The Hockey News John Ferguson Award (toughest player) – 2013
- In 2023, he was ranked number 57 in The Athletic's list of the 100 greatest hockey players of all time
- In 2026, JetBlue gate 33 at Logan International Airport was renamed for Chára

=== Records ===
- Tallest player in NHL history at 6 ft 9 in (2.06 m) tall.
- First NHL player born in the Eastern Bloc to captain an NHL team to the Stanley Cup (2011).
- NHL All-Star Skills Competition hardest shot record – 108.8 mph (175.067 km/h) (2012) (surpassed his previous record from 2011 at 105.9 mph, which surpassed a second previous record of his from 2009 at 105.4 mph)
- Won the NHL All-Star Skills Competition hardest shot 5 times the most in NHL history.
- Most game 7 playoff appearances in NHL history (14).
- Oldest defenceman in NHL history to score a game-winning goal in the Stanley Cup playoffs – 42 years and 30 days.
- Oldest defenceman in NHL history to score a goal in the Stanley Cup Final – 42 years and 83 days.
- Most games played by a defenceman in NHL history.

== See also ==
- List of NHL players with 1,000 games played
- List of Slovaks in the NHL

== Notes ==
Sporting positions
Preceded by Joe Thornton	Boston Bruins captain 2006–2020	Succeeded by Patrice Bergeron
Awards and achievements
Preceded by Nicklas Lidström	James Norris Memorial Trophy winner 2009	Succeeded by Duncan Keith
Olympic Games
Preceded by Žigmund Pálffy	Flagbearer for Slovakia; Sochi 2014	Succeeded by Veronika Velez-Zuzulová
