= Belle Tire =

American automotive services retailer

Belle Tire Distributors, Inc.

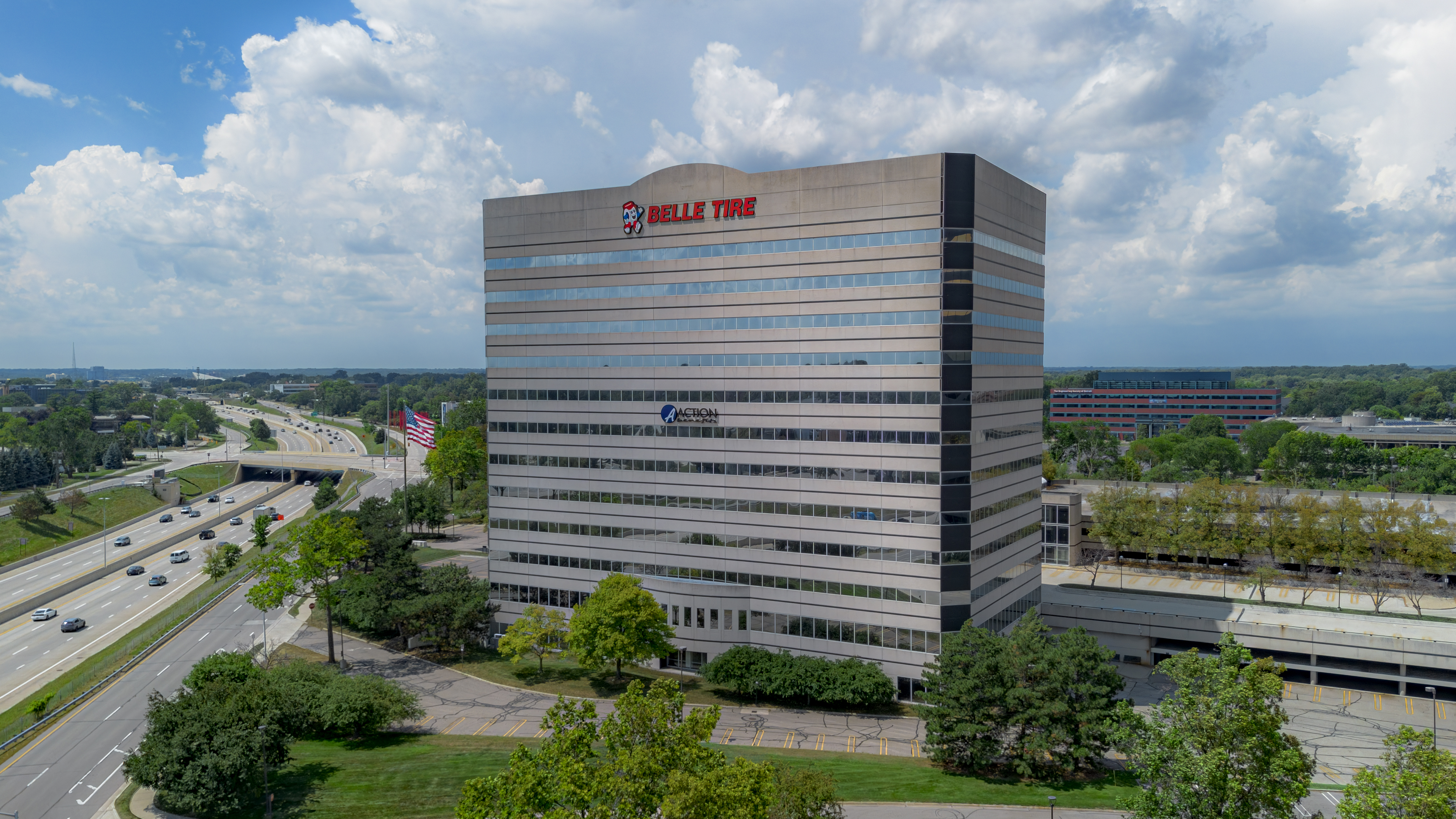
- Belle Tire headquarters in Southfield, Michigan
- Type: Private
- Industry: Automotive, Retail
- Founded: 1922; 104 years ago Detroit, Michigan, U.S.
- Founder: Sam Waze
- Headquarters: Southfield, Michigan, U.S.
- Number of locations: 185 (2026)
- Key people: Don Barnes III, President
- Products: Tires, wheels, automotive repair services, auto glass services, oil changes, and wheel alignments
- Owner: Don Barnes III
- Number of employees: 3,000+
- Website: belletire.com

Belle Tire is an American regional chain of tire shops headquartered in Southfield, Michigan. It was founded in 1922, after its first location was opened in Detroit, Michigan, by Sam Waze. As of 2025, the company operates more than 180 locations in the U.S. states of Michigan, Indiana, Ohio and Illinois.

In July 2026, Belle Tire agreed to be acquired by Big Brand Tire & Service of Moorpark, California; the acquisition is expected to close in the third quarter of 2026.

== History ==
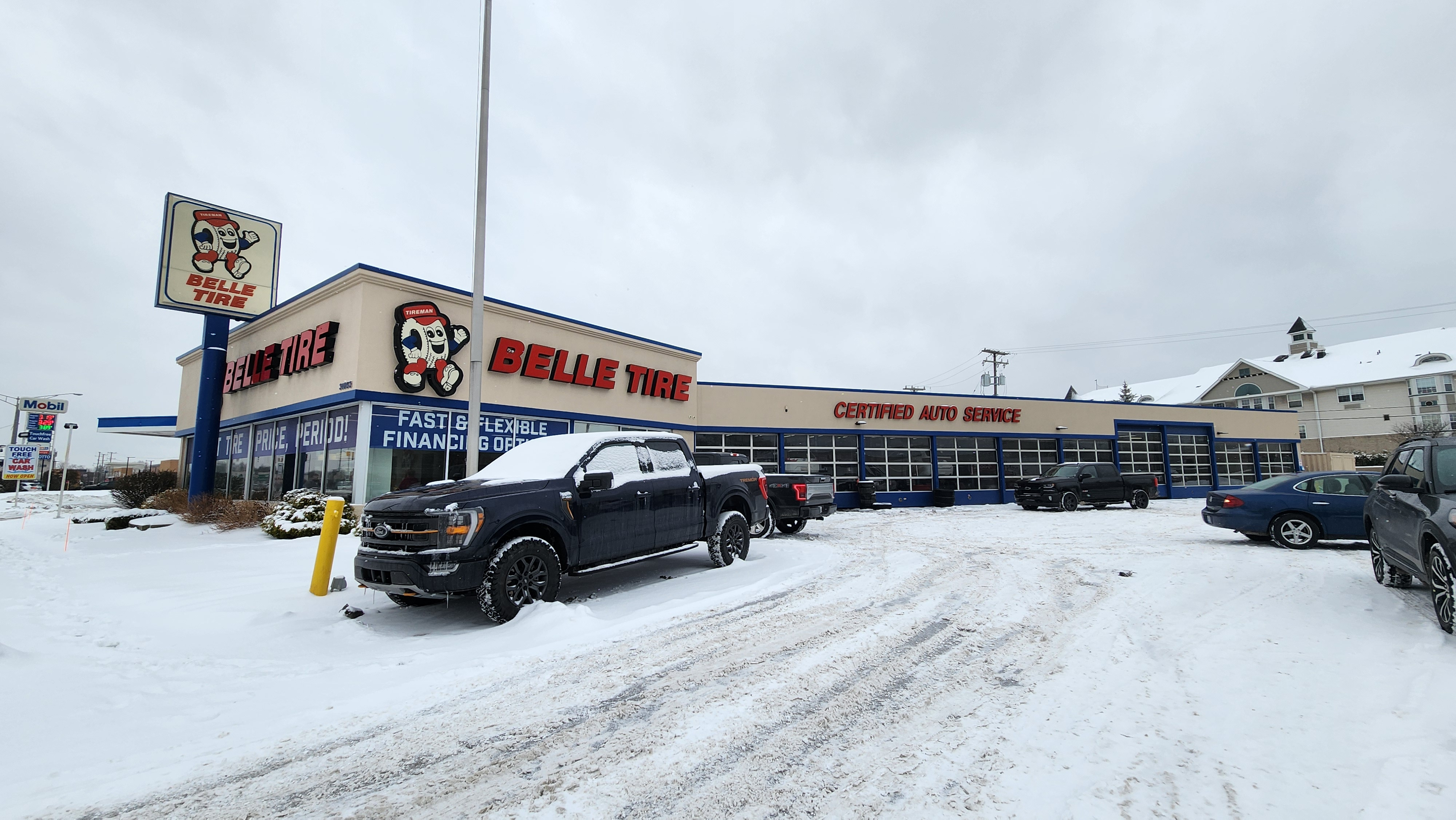
A Belle Tire location in Royal Oak, Michigan

Belle Tire was founded by Sam Waze in Detroit in 1922. The store was named for his wife, Belle Waze, and was located on Grand River Avenue in Detroit.

In the 1960s, Don Barnes Sr., a Kelly Springfield Tire Company salesman who had been a supplier to Belle Tire, partnered with Herb Waze, who had taken over the business from his father. The partnership proved to be successful, with Belle Tire opening several other locations in the Metro Detroit area. In 1984, the Barnes family bought the Waze family's remaining shares, and continued expansion of the business through acquisitions of American Tire, Capital Tire, Delta Tire, and Great Lakes Tire.

Belle Tire grew via the acquisition of Sears National Tire and Battery locations in Michigan in the early 2000s. Since the mid-2000s Belle Tire has continued its expansion throughout Michigan, building new stores in the Metro Detroit, Flint, Grand Rapids, Kalamazoo, and Lansing areas.

Belle Tire established its headquarters and primary distribution center in Allen Park, Michigan in 1984. The chain grew significantly in the 1990s through acquisitions: the company acquired Tireman, a competing Detroit-area tire retailer with 13 locations, in 1994, and purchased 9 stores from competitor Metro 25 in 1997. By 1999, Belle Tire had become one of the ten largest independent tire retail chains in the United States.

In 2003, Belle Tire expanded beyond Michigan for the first time, establishing 3 locations in the Toledo metropolitan area in Ohio. In 2006, it relocated its headquarters within Allen Park, moving them into a former Frito-Lay plant.

In 2015, Belle Tire expanded its retail footprint to Indiana with 5 locations: Mishawaka, Elkhart, Terre Haute and two in South Bend. This expansion marked an important moment in the company's more than 90-year history in the tire business. It was the company's first move into new territory since expanding from Michigan to northern Ohio more than 30 years ago. In 2015, Don Barnes III was named president. With the success of the brand's expansion into Indiana, Belle Tire added over 30 stores (and counting) in Illinois starting in 2022.

Belle Tire moved its corporate offices from Allen Park to Southfield, Michigan in 2023.

In July 2026, Belle Tire agreed to be acquired by Big Brand Tire & Service of Moorpark, California, owned by the private equity firm Percheron Capital. The acquisition is expected to close in the third quarter of 2026. The combined company will operate 530 stores across the U.S., and is expected to retain Don Barnes III as president of Belle Tire.

== Operations ==
Belle Tire's mascot is an anthropomorphic tire named Tireman, who appears in the company's logo and marketing.

=== Sponsorships ===
Belle Tire is a sponsor of the Detroit Tigers, Detroit Red Wings, Chicago Blackhawks, and Indiana Pacers.
