= NHL All-Decade team =

Decennial National Hockey League honor

NHL All-Decade Team
- Sport: Ice hockey
- League: National Hockey League
- Awarded for: Best players of the decade at each position as chosen by an NHL-selected panel

History
- First award: 2009

The National Hockey League All-Decade teams were first named during the 2009–10 NHL season, to honor the best performers over the past decade at each position.

A panel of hockey figures, including NHL general managers, league employees, writers, and on-air personalities from NBC, Sportsnet and TVA Sports, chooses the All-Decade teams at the end of each decade. In 2020, the All-Decade team was announced during All-Star weekend.

Alexander Ovechkin, Sidney Crosby, and Zdeno Chara are the only players to have been named to multiple teams, with Ovechkin the only player named to the First Team twice. The entire 2000s All-Decade First Team, except for the still-active Ovechkin, have been inducted into the Hockey Hall of Fame.

== Selections ==
^	Denotes players who are still active in the NHL
#	Denotes players who are still active outside of the NHL
*	Denotes players inducted into the Hockey Hall of Fame
†	Denotes inactive players not yet eligible for Hockey Hall of Fame consideration
Player (X)	Denotes the number of times a player has been selected

Decade	Position	First Team		Second Team	
Decade	Position	Player	Team	Player	Team
2000–2009	C	Joe Sakic*	Colorado Avalanche	Sidney Crosby^	Pittsburgh Penguins
2000–2009	LW	Alexander Ovechkin^	Washington Capitals	Jaromir Jagr#	Pittsburgh Penguins; Washington Capitals; New York Rangers
2000–2009	RW	Jarome Iginla*	Calgary Flames	Ilya Kovalchuk†	Atlanta Thrashers
2000–2009	D	Nicklas Lidstrom*	Detroit Red Wings	Zdeno Chara*	New York Islanders; Ottawa Senators; Boston Bruins
2000–2009	D	Scott Niedermayer*	New Jersey Devils; Mighty Ducks of Anaheim/Anaheim Ducks	Chris Pronger*	St. Louis Blues; Edmonton Oilers; Anaheim Ducks; Philadelphia Flyers
2000–2009	G	Martin Brodeur*	New Jersey Devils	Chris Osgood	Detroit Red Wings; New York Islanders; St. Louis Blues
2010–2019	F	Sidney Crosby^ (2)	Pittsburgh Penguins	Patrice Bergeron*	Boston Bruins
2010–2019	F	Patrick Kane^	Chicago Blackhawks	Evgeni Malkin^	Pittsburgh Penguins
2010–2019	F	Alexander Ovechkin^ (2)	Washington Capitals	Steven Stamkos^	Tampa Bay Lightning
2010–2019	D	Drew Doughty^	Los Angeles Kings	Zdeno Chara* (2)	Boston Bruins
2010–2019	D	Duncan Keith*	Chicago Blackhawks	Erik Karlsson^	Ottawa Senators; San Jose Sharks
2010–2019	G	Marc-Andre Fleury†	Pittsburgh Penguins; Vegas Golden Knights	Henrik Lundqvist*	New York Rangers

== See also ==
- NHL All-Star Game
- NHL All-Star team
- NHL All-Rookie Team
