= Arizona State Sun Devils men's ice hockey statistical leaders =

The Arizona State Sun Devils men's ice hockey statistical leaders are individual statistical leaders of the Arizona State Sun Devils men's ice hockey program in various categories, including goals, assists, points, and saves. Within those areas, the lists identify single-game, single-season, and career leaders. The Sun Devils represent Arizona State University as in independent in the NCAA.

Arizona State began competing in intercollegiate ice hockey in 2015. These lists are updated through the end of the 2020–21 season.

== Goals ==
Career
Rk	Player	Goals	Seasons
1	Johnny Walker	70	2017–18 2018–19 2019–20 2020–21 2021–22
2	Matthew Kopperud	64	2020–21 2021–22 2022–23 2023–24
3	Brinson Pasichnuk	39	2016–17 2017–18 2018–19 2019–20
4	Josh Doan	28	2021–22 2022–23
	Lukas Sillinger	28	2022–23 2023–24 2024–25
	Bennett Schimek	28	2024–25 2025–26
7	Tyler Busch	26	2016–17 2017–18 2018–19 2019–20
	Ryan O'Reilly	26	2020–21 2021–22 2022–23 2023–24
	Ryan Kirwan	26	2024–25
	Dylan Jackson	26	2022–23 2023–24 2024–25
	Kyle Smolen	26	2023–24 2024–25 2025–26

Season
Rk	Player	Goals	Season
1	Ryan Kirwan	26	2024–25
2	Johnny Walker	23	2018–19
	Matthew Kopperud	23	2023–24
4	Matthew Kopperud	22	2021–22
5	Johnny Walker	20	2019–20
6	Colin Theisen	19	2021–22
7	Johnny Walker	17	2017–18
	Artem Shlaine	17	2024–25
9	Josh Doan	16	2022–23
10	Willie Knierim	15	2019–20
	Bennett Schimek	15	2024–25
	Cruz Lucius	15	2025–26

== Assists ==
Career
Rk	Player	Assists	Seasons
1	Lukas Sillinger	79	2022–23 2023–24 2024–25
2	Brinson Pasichnuk	68	2016–17 2017–18 2018–19 2019–20
3	Timothy Lovell	65	2021–22 2022–23 2023–24
4	Brett Gruber	53	2016–17 2017–18 2018–19 2019–20
	Johnny Walker	53	2017–18 2018–19 2019–20 2020–21 2021–22
6	Bennett Schimek	52	2024–25 2025–26
7	Tyler Busch	51	2016–17 2017–18 2018–19 2019–20
8	Josh Doan	47	2021–22 2022–23
9	Demetrios Koumontzis	45	2018–19 2019–20 2020–21 2021–22 2022–23
	Ty Jackson	45	2022–23 2023–24 2024–25

Season
Rk	Player	Assists	Season
1	Lukas Sillinger	37	2023–24
2	Timothy Lovell	32	2023–24
3	Robert Mastrosimone	31	2022–23
	Cruz Lucius	31	2025–26
5	James Sanchez	30	2019–20
	Lukas Sillinger	30	2024–25
	Bennett Schimek	30	2025–26
8	Noah Beck	28	2024–25
9	Brinson Pasichnuk	26	2019–20
10	Josh Doan	25	2021–22

== Points ==
Career
Rk	Player	Points	Seasons
1	Johnny Walker	123	2017–18 2018–19 2019–20 2020–21 2021–22
2	Brinson Pasichnuk	107	2016–17 2017–18 2018–19 2019–20
	Matthew Kopperud	107	2020–21 2021–22 2022–23 2023–24
	Lukas Sillinger	107	2022–23 2023–24 2024–25
5	Bennett Schimek	80	2024–25 2025–26
6	Tyler Busch	77	2016–17 2017–18 2018–19 2019–20
	Timothy Lovell	77	2021–22 2022–23 2023–24
8	Brett Gruber	76	2016–17 2017–18 2018–19 2019–20
9	Josh Doan	75	2021–22 2022–23
10	Demetrios Koumontzis	67	2018–19 2019–20 2020–21 2021–22 2022–23

Season
Rk	Player	Points	Season
1	Lukas Sillinger	48	2023–24
2	Cruz Lucius	46	2025–26
3	Bennett Schimek	43	2025–26
4	Colin Theisen	42	2021–22
	Robert Mastrosimone	42	2022–23
6	James Sanchez	40	2019–20
	Matthew Kopperud	40	2021–22
8	Ryan Kirwan	39	2024–25
9	Johnny Walker	38	2019–20
	Josh Doan	38	2022–23
	Artem Shlaine	38	2024–25
	Lukas Sillinger	38	2024–25

== Saves ==
Career
Rk	Player	Saves	Seasons
1	Joey Daccord	2518	2016–17 2017–18 2018–19
2	TJ Semptimphelter	1657	2022–23 2023–24
3	Evan DeBrouwer	1363	2018–19 2019–20 2020–21
4	Ryland Pashovitz	937	2015–16 2016–17 2017–18
5	Benjamin Kraws	814	2021–22 2022–23
	Gibson Homer	814	2023–24 2024–25
7	Cole Brady	731	2020–21 2021–22
8	Connor Hasley	673	2025–26
9	Robert Levin	590	2015–16 2016–17
10	Luke Pavicich	566	2024–25

Season
Rk	Player	Saves	Season
1	Joey Daccord	1084	2017–18
2	Joey Daccord	1030	2018–19
3	TJ Semptimphelter	1024	2022–23
4	Evan DeBrouwer	908	2019–20
5	Benjamin Kraws	689	2021–22
6	Connor Hasley	673	2025–26
7	TJ Semptimphelter	633	2023–24
8	Ryland Pashovitz	587	2015–16
9	Luke Pavicich	566	2024–25
10	Samuel Urban	461	2025–26
