= List of Arizona State Sun Devils men's ice hockey seasons =

This is a list of seasons completed by the Arizona State University men's ice hockey team. The list documents the season-by-season records of the Sun Devils from 2015 to present, including postseason results.

== Season-by-season results ==
Note: GP = Games played, W = Wins, L = Losses, T = Ties

NCAA D-I Champions	NCAA Frozen Four	Conference regular season champions	Conference Playoff Champions

Season	Conference	Regular season (Note: Code explanation; GP—Games Played, W—Wins, L—Losses, T—Tied games, OTW—Overtime Wins*, OTL—Overtime Losses*, SOW—Shutout Wins*, Pts—Points*)														Conference Tournament Results	National Tournament Results
Season	Conference	Conference									Overall					Conference Tournament Results	National Tournament Results
Season	Conference	GP	W	L	T	OTW	OTL	SOW	Pts*	Finish	GP	W	L	T	%	Conference Tournament Results	National Tournament Results
Division I
Greg Powers (2015 — 2026)
2015–16	Independent	—	—	—	—	—	—	—	—	—	34	8	22	4	.294		
2016–17	Independent	—	—	—	—	—	—	—	—	—	32	10	19	3	.359		
2017–18	Independent	—	—	—	—	—	—	—	—	—	34	8	21	5	.309		
2018–19	Independent	—	—	—	—	—	—	—	—	—	34	21	13	1	.614		Lost Regional semifinal, 1–2 (Quinnipiac)
2019–20	Independent	—	—	—	—	—	—	—	—	—	36	22	11	3	.653		
2020–21	Independent	—	—	—	—	—	—	—	—	—	26	7	16	3	.327		
2021–22	Independent	—	—	—	—	—	—	—	—	—	35	17	17	1	.500		
2022–23	Independent	—	—	—	—	—	—	—	—	—	39	18	21	0	.462		
2023–24	Independent	—	—	—	—	—	—	—	—	—	38	24	8	6	.711		
2024–25	NCHC	26	16	10	1	2	5	1	47	2nd	37	21	14	2	.595	Won Quarterfinal series, 2–0 (Minnesota Duluth); Lost Semifinal, 2–4 (Denver)	
2025-26	NCHC	24	7	16	1	2	1	1	22	9th	36	14	21	1	.403		
2026–27	NCHC	Powers coached no games was replaced mid-season after being placed on administrative leave pre-season.															
Mike Corbett (acting) (2026)
2026–27	NCHC	—	—	—	—	—	—	—	—	—	4	2	2	0	.500		
Dave Hakstol (2026 — present)
2026–27	NCHC	—	—	—	—	—	—	—	—	—	0	0	0	0	–		
Totals											GP	W	L	T	%	Championships	
Regular season											373	177	168	28	.475		
Conference Post-season											3	2	1	0	.667		
NCAA Post-season											1	0	1	0	.000	1 NCAA Tournament Appearance	
Regular season and Post-season Record											377	179	170	28	.487		

* Winning percentage is used when conference schedules are unbalanced.
