= 2020–21 Arizona State Sun Devils men's ice hockey season =

- Conference: Independent
- Home ice: Oceanside Ice Arena; Gila River Arena

Rankings
- USCHO.com: NR
- USA Today/ US Hockey Magazine: NR

Record
- Overall: 6–16–3
- Home: 0–0–0
- Road: 6–16–3
- Neutral: 0–0–0

Coaches and captains
- Head coach: Greg Powers
- Assistant coaches: Mike Field; Alex Hicks; Eddie Läck
- Captain(s): Jacob Wilson; Johnny Walker
- Alternate captain(s): Dominic Garcia; Jordan Sandhu

The 2020–21 Arizona State Sun Devils men's ice hockey season was the 6th season of play for the program at the Division I level. The Sun Devils represented Arizona State University and were coached by Greg Powers, in his 11th season.

== Season ==
Due to the COVID-19 pandemic, the start of the Sun Devils' season was delayed. Due to scheduling problems resulting from the pandemic, Arizona State entered into a scheduling alliance with the Big Ten and would play a conference schedule. The Sun Devils would only participate in regular season games against Big Ten teams, the program would not formally join the conference nor would any of its games be counted in the Big Ten standings. Arizona State would also not be eligible for the Big Ten Tournament.

Due to the nature of their agreement, Arizona State played all of its games on the road. That, and playing against stronger competition that previous years, led to the Sun Devils' facing an uphill battle in their pursuit of a second NCAA berth. In ASU's first series of the season they were swept by Michigan but were dealt a serious blow when senior captain and all-time leading goal scorer, Johnny Walker, suffered a knee injury that would keep him out for 6 weeks. After another offensively inept series, the Sun Devils suddenly came to life against Wisconsin, taking both games and jumping back into the USCHO rankings.

The team played well in Walker's absence, ending the year with a 4–6–2 record, but when their captain returned the team was in the middle of a string of ranked opponents. For the entire month of January, Arizona State played top-20 teams. When the dust settled, ASU's record had plummeted and the team had virtually no chance of making the national tournament. The team played well over the final three weeks of the season but they couldn't recover from a disastrous 1–7 run.

== Departures ==
| Player | Position | Nationality | Cause |
|---|---|---|---|
| Max Balinson | Defenseman | Canada | Transfer (Long Island) |
| Tyler Busch | Forward | Canada | Graduation (Signed with Tranås AIF) |
| Brett Gruber | Forward | Canada | Graduation |
| Logan Jenuwine | Forward | United States | Transfer (Lake Superior State) |
| Austin Lemieux | Forward | United States | Retired |
| Josh Maniscalco | Defenseman | United States | Signed Professional Contract (Pittsburgh Penguins) |
| Brinson Pasichnuk | Forward | Canada | Graduation (Signed with San Jose Sharks) |
| Steenn Pasichnuk | Forward | Canada | Graduation (Signed with San Jose Barracuda) |
| Max Prawdzik | Goaltender | United States | Graduation |

== Recruiting ==
| Player | Position | Nationality | Age | Notes |
|---|---|---|---|---|
| Cole Brady | Goaltender | Canada | 19 | Pickering, ON; 127th selection in the 2019 NHL entry draft |
| Sean Dhooghe | Forward | United States | 21 | Aurora, IL; transfer from Wisconsin |
| Benji Eckerle | Forward | United States | 21 | Northville, MI |
| Chris Grando | Forward | United States | 22 | Islip, NY; transfer from Boston College |
| Tanner Hickey | Defenseman | Canada | 21 | Leduc, AB; transfer from Alabama–Huntsville |
| Matthew Kopperud | Forward | Canada | 21 | Denver, CO |
| Carson Kosobud | Defenseman | United States | 21 | Moorhead, MN |
| Michael Mancinelli | Forward | United States | 19 | Northville, MI |
| Bronson Moore | Goaltender | United States | 22 | Tempe, AZ; previously played club hockey |
| Ryan O'Reilly | Forward | United States | 20 | Southlake, TX; 98th selection in the 2018 NHL entry draft |

== Roster ==
As of January 3, 2021.

| No. | Nat. | Player | Class | Pos | Height | Weight | DoB | Hometown | Previous team | NHL rights |
|---|---|---|---|---|---|---|---|---|---|---|
| 2 | (United States) | Connor Stuart | Junior | D | 6' 2" (1.88 m) | 190 lb (86 kg) | 1997-02-12 | Phoenix, Arizona | Lone Star Brahmas (NAHL) | — |
| 3 | (Latvia) | Gvido Jansons | Senior | D | 6' 4" (1.93 m) | 210 lb (95 kg) | 1997-01-09 | Grobiņa, Latvia | Aston Rebels (NAHL) | — |
| 4 | (United States) | Jacob Wilson (C) | Senior | D | 5' 11" (1.8 m) | 185 lb (84 kg) | 1997-02-27 | Ballwin, Missouri | Sioux City Musketeers (USHL) | — |
| 7 | (United States) | Johnny Walker (C) | Senior | F | 6' 1" (1.85 m) | 185 lb (84 kg) | 1996-08-21 | Phoenix, Arizona | Chicago Steel (USHL) | — |
| 8 | (Canada) | Tanner Hickey | Sophomore | D | 5' 10" (1.78 m) | 170 lb (77 kg) | 1999-04-30 | Leduc, Alberta | Alabama Huntsville (WCHA) | — |
| 9 | (United States) | Sean Dhooghe | Senior | F | 5' 3" (1.6 m) | 150 lb (68 kg) | 1999-03-09 | Aurora, Illinois | Wisconsin (Big Ten) | — |
| 10 | (United States) | Michael Mancinelli | Freshman | F | 5' 9" (1.75 m) | 185 lb (84 kg) | 2001-06-28 | Northville, Michigan | Des Moines Buccaneers (USHL) | — |
| 11 | (United States) | Benji Eckerle | Freshman | F | 5' 9" (1.75 m) | 175 lb (79 kg) | 1999-09-24 | Northville, Michigan | Tri-City Storm (USHL) | — |
| 13 | (United States) | Chris Grando | Junior (RS) | F | 5' 10" (1.78 m) | 171 lb (78 kg) | 1998-08-22 | Islip, New York | Boston College (HEA) | — |
| 15 | (United States) | Carson Kosobud | Freshman | D | 6' 0" (1.83 m) | 190 lb (86 kg) | 1999-06-04 | Moorhead, Minnesota | Penticton Vees (BCHL) | — |
| 17 | (United States) | Jacob Semik | Sophomore | D | 6' 0" (1.83 m) | 180 lb (82 kg) | 2000-03-10 | Canton, Michigan | Dubuque Fighting Saints (USHL) | — |
| 18 | (United States) | Jax Murray | Sophomore | F | 5' 9" (1.75 m) | 185 lb (84 kg) | 1998-12-26 | Princeton, Minnesota | Fairbanks Ice Dogs (NAHL) | — |
| 19 | (Canada) | Jordan Sandhu (A) | Junior | F | 5' 7" (1.7 m) | 155 lb (70 kg) | 1999-05-13 | Richmond, British Columbia | Vernon Vipers (BCHL) | — |
| 20 | (Latvia) | Filips Buncis | Senior | F | 6' 4" (1.93 m) | 220 lb (100 kg) | 1997-06-12 | Jelgava, Latvia | Johnstown Tomahawks (NAHL) | — |
| 21 | (China) | Peter Zhong | Sophomore (RS) | F | 5' 11" (1.8 m) | 175 lb (79 kg) | 1998-07-30 | Beijing, China | Philadelphia Rebels (NAHL) | — |
| 22 | (Canada) | Jack Judson | Sophomore | D | 6' 0" (1.83 m) | 180 lb (82 kg) | 2000-02-26 | White Rock, British Columbia | Vernon Vipers (BCHL) | — |
| 23 | (United States) | Demetrios Koumontzis | Junior | F | 5' 10" (1.78 m) | 183 lb (83 kg) | 2000-03-24 | Scottsdale, Arizona | Edina High School (USHS–MN) | CGY, 108th overall 2018 |
| 25 | (Canada) | P. J. Marrocco | Junior | F | 5' 8" (1.73 m) | 170 lb (77 kg) | 1997-08-27 | Edmonton, Alberta | Chilliwack Chiefs (BCHL) | — |
| 28 | (United States) | Matthew Kopperud | Freshman | F | 5' 11" (1.8 m) | 170 lb (77 kg) | 1999-08-04 | Denver, Colorado | Dubuque Fighting Saints (USHL) | — |
| 29 | (United States) | William Knierim | Senior | F | 6' 4" (1.93 m) | 225 lb (102 kg) | 1998-01-22 | Skokie, Illinois | Dubuque Fighting Saints (USHL) | — |
| 30 | (Canada) | Evan DeBrouwer | Junior | G | 6' 3" (1.91 m) | 190 lb (86 kg) | 1997-01-30 | Blenheim, Ontario | Prince George Spruce Kings (BCHL) | — |
| 31 | (United States) | Justin Robbins | Sophomore | G | 5' 9" (1.75 m) | 158 lb (72 kg) | 1999-03-10 | Alpine, New Jersey | Chicago Steel (USHL) | — |
| 33 | (United States) | Bronson Moore | Junior | G | 5' 11" (1.8 m) | 161 lb (73 kg) | 1997-11-004 | Kennewick, Washington | Minnesota Moose (USPHL) | — |
| 34 | (Canada) | Cole Brady | Freshman | G | 6' 5" (1.96 m) | 180 lb (82 kg) | 2001-02-12 | Pickering, Ontario | Fargo Force (USHL) | NJD, 127th overall 2019 |
| 37 | (United States) | Dominic Garcia (A) | Senior | F | 5' 11" (1.8 m) | 204 lb (93 kg) | 1996-10-30 | Las Vegas, Nevada | Aston Rebels (NAHL) | — |
| 39 | (United States) | Ryan O'Reilly | Freshman | F | 6' 3" (1.91 m) | 205 lb (93 kg) | 2000-03-21 | Southlake, Texas | Green Bay Gamblers (USHL) | DET, 98th overall 2018 |
| 60 | (Canada) | Jarrod Gourley | Junior | D | 6' 2" (1.88 m) | 212 lb (96 kg) | 1999-06-29 | Calgary, Alberta | Spruce Grove Saints (AJHL) | — |
| 61 | (United States) | James Sanchez | Senior | F | 6' 2" (1.88 m) | 195 lb (88 kg) | 1998-02-25 | Northbrook, Illinois | Dubuque Fighting Saints (USHL) | — |

== Standings ==
2020–21 NCAA Division I Independent ice hockey standings
| | Overall record | | | | | |
| | GP | W | L | T | GF | GA |
|---|---|---|---|---|---|---|
| Arizona State | 26 | 7 | 16 | 3 | 68 | 106 |
| Long Island | 13 | 3 | 10 | 0 | 23 | 55 |
Rankings: USCHO.com Top 20 Poll

== Schedule and results ==
| Date | Time | Opponent^{#} | Rank^{#} | Site | TV | Decision | Result | Attendance | Record |
Regular season
| November 14 | 1:04 PM | at #12 Michigan* | #15 | Yost Ice Arena • Ann Arbor, Michigan | | Debrouwer | L 1–8 | 80 | 0–1–0 |
| November 15 | 5:05 PM | at #12 Michigan* | #15 | Yost Ice Arena • Ann Arbor, Michigan | BTN | Brady | L 0–3 | 72 | 0–2–0 |
| November 19 | 4:04 PM | at Michigan State* | | Munn Ice Arena • East Lansing, Michigan | BTN | Brady | T 1–1 ^{OT} | 100 | 0–2–1 |
| November 20 | 4:04 PM | at Michigan State* | | Munn Ice Arena • East Lansing, Michigan | | Debrouwer | L 0–2 | 100 | 0–3–1 |
| November 28 | 6:04 PM | at #14 Wisconsin* | | Kohl Center • Madison, Wisconsin | FSW | Brady | W 8–5 | 0 | 1–3–1 |
| November 29 | 3:04 PM | at #14 Wisconsin* | | Kohl Center • Madison, Wisconsin | FSW | Debrouwer | W 3–1 | 0 | 2–3–1 |
| December 3 | 5:06 PM | at #16 Notre Dame* | #20 | Compton Family Ice Arena • Notre Dame, Indiana | NHL Network | Debrouwer | W 6–3 | 0 | 3–3–1 |
| December 7 | 5:06 PM | at #16 Notre Dame* | #20 | Compton Family Ice Arena • Notre Dame, Indiana | NBCSN | Brady | L 4–5 | 0 | 3–4–1 |
| December 11 | 4:04 PM | at Penn State* | #20 | Pegula Ice Arena • University Park, Pennsylvania | | Debrouwer | L 2–3 ^{OT} | 184 | 3–5–1 |
| December 13 | 12:04 PM | at Penn State* | #20 | Pegula Ice Arena • University Park, Pennsylvania | | Debrouwer | L 4–5 ^{OT} | 86 | 3–6–1 |
| December 17 | 3:30 PM | at #18 Ohio State* | | Value City Arena • Columbus, Ohio | | Debrouwer | T 4–4 ^{OT} | 0 | 3–6–2 |
| December 18 | 3:30 PM | at #18 Ohio State* | | Value City Arena • Columbus, Ohio | | Debrouwer | W 3–2 | 0 | 4–6–2 |
| January 3 | 2:00 PM | at #1 Minnesota* | | 3M Arena at Mariucci • Minneapolis, Minnesota | | Debrouwer | L 1–4 | 0 | 4–7–2 |
| January 4 | 6:05 PM | at #1 Minnesota* | | 3M Arena at Mariucci • Minneapolis, Minnesota | | Debrouwer | L 4–6 | 0 | 4–8–2 |
| January 9 | 4:36 PM | at #18 Notre Dame* | | Compton Family Ice Arena • Notre Dame, Indiana | | Debrouwer | L 4–5 | 74 | 4–9–2 |
| January 10 | 3:06 PM | at #18 Notre Dame* | | Compton Family Ice Arena • Notre Dame, Indiana | | Robbins | W 5–3 | 0 | 5–9–2 |
| January 16 | 6:04 PM | at #12 Wisconsin* | | Kohl Center • Madison, Wisconsin | FSW | Robbins | L 0–4 | 0 | 5–10–2 |
| January 17 | 5:34 PM | at #12 Wisconsin* | | Kohl Center • Madison, Wisconsin | FSW | Debrouwer | L 2–5 | 0 | 5–11–2 |
| January 21 | 5:05 PM | at #2 Minnesota* | | 3M Arena at Mariucci • Minneapolis, Minnesota | | Robbins | L 0–10 | 0 | 5–12–2 |
| January 22 | 2:00 PM | at #2 Minnesota* | | 3M Arena at Mariucci • Minneapolis, Minnesota | | Debrouwer | L 2–10 | 0 | 5–13–2 |
| February 4 | 7:00 PM | vs. USNTDP* | | Oceanside Ice Arena • Tempe, Arizona (Exhibition) | | Brady | L 3–6 | 53 | |
| February 5 | 7:00 PM | vs. USNTDP* | | Oceanside Ice Arena • Tempe, Arizona (Exhibition) | | Brady | W 2–1 | 69 | |
| February 14 | 1:00 PM | at Michigan State* | | Munn Ice Arena • East Lansing, Michigan | | Brady | W 3–2 | 101 | 6–13–2 |
| February 15 | 3:00 PM | at Michigan State* | | Munn Ice Arena • East Lansing, Michigan | | Brady | L 1–2 | 81 | 6–14–2 |
| February 26 | 5:05 PM | at #7 Michigan* | | Yost Ice Arena • Ann Arbor, Michigan | | Brady | L 1–4 | 61 | 6–15–2 |
| February 27 | 5:04 PM | at #7 Michigan* | | Yost Ice Arena • Ann Arbor, Michigan | | Brady | T 1–1 ^{OT} | 71 | 6–15–3 |
| March 4 | 3:30 PM | at Ohio State* | | Value City Arena • Columbus, Ohio | | Brady | L 3–8 | 60 | 6–16–3 |
| March 5 | 3:30 PM | at Ohio State* | | Value City Arena • Columbus, Ohio | | Brady | W 5–0 | 74 | 7–16–3 |
*Non-conference game. ^{#}Rankings from USCHO.com Poll. All times are in Mountain Time.

== Scoring Statistics ==
| Name | Position | Games | Goals | Assists | Points | PIM |
|---|---|---|---|---|---|---|
| Matthew Kopperud | F | 25 | 13 | 6 | 19 | 8 |
| James Sanchez | LW | 26 | 5 | 11 | 16 | 8 |
| Chris Grando | LW | 25 | 6 | 8 | 14 | 6 |
| Johnny Walker | RW | 16 | 4 | 10 | 14 | 21 |
| Ryan O'Reilly | RW/C | 23 | 3 | 10 | 13 | 8 |
| Jacob Semik | D | 25 | 1 | 10 | 11 | 4 |
| Michael Mancinelli | C | 26 | 6 | 4 | 10 | 8 |
| Jax Murray | F | 22 | 5 | 5 | 10 | 0 |
| Demetrios Koumontzis | LW | 22 | 4 | 6 | 10 | 14 |
| Willie Knierim | RW | 18 | 5 | 4 | 9 | 12 |
| Benji Eckerle | F | 25 | 4 | 5 | 9 | 14 |
| Jacob Wilson | D | 22 | 1 | 7 | 8 | 12 |
| Jack Judson | D | 26 | 1 | 7 | 8 | 14 |
| Jordan Sandhu | C | 26 | 2 | 5 | 7 | 6 |
| P. J. Marrocco | F | 24 | 1 | 4 | 5 | 0 |
| Sean Dhooghe | RW | 20 | 2 | 2 | 4 | 2 |
| Jarrod Gourley | D | 22 | 2 | 2 | 4 | 10 |
| Tanner Hickey | D | 26 | 1 | 3 | 4 | 8 |
| Dominic Garcia | F | 24 | 2 | 0 | 2 | 0 |
| Evan Debrouwer | G | 16 | 0 | 2 | 2 | 0 |
| Gvido Jansons | D | 26 | 0 | 2 | 2 | 34 |
| Bronson Moore | G | 1 | 0 | 0 | 0 | 0 |
| Filips Buncis | C | 2 | 0 | 0 | 0 | 0 |
| Justin Robbins | G | 3 | 0 | 0 | 0 | 0 |
| Peter Zhong | LW | 4 | 0 | 0 | 0 | 0 |
| Connor Stuart | D/F | 5 | 0 | 0 | 0 | 0 |
| Carson Kosobud | D | 10 | 0 | 0 | 0 | 2 |
| Cole Brady | G | 13 | 0 | 0 | 0 | 0 |
| Bench | - | - | - | - | - | 8 |
| Total | | | 68 | 113 | 181 | 199 |

== Goaltending statistics ==
| Name | Games | Minutes | Wins | Losses | Ties | Goals against | Saves | Shut outs | SV % | GAA |
|---|---|---|---|---|---|---|---|---|---|---|
| Cole Brady | 13 | 635 | 3 | 5 | 2 | 35 | 354 | 1 | .910 | 3.31 |
| Evan Debrouwer | 16 | 827 | 3 | 9 | 1 | 57 | 454 | 0 | .888 | 4.13 |
| Justin Robbins | 3 | 96 | 1 | 2 | 0 | 10 | 51 | 0 | .836 | 6.23 |
| Bronson Moore | 1 | 13 | 0 | 0 | 0 | 2 | 6 | 0 | .750 | 8.75 |
| Empty Net | - | 7 | - | - | - | 2 | - | - | - | - |
| Total | 26 | 1580 | 7 | 16 | 3 | 106 | 865 | 1 | .891 | 4.02 |

== Rankings ==
| Poll | Week | | | | | | | | | | | | | | | | | | | | | |
| Poll | Pre | 1 | 2 | 3 | 4 | 5 | 6 | 7 | 8 | 9 | 10 | 11 | 12 | 13 | 14 | 15 | 16 | 17 | 18 | 19 | 20 | 21 (Final) |
|---|---|---|---|---|---|---|---|---|---|---|---|---|---|---|---|---|---|---|---|---|---|---|
| USCHO.com | 15 | NR | NR | 20 | 20 | NR | NR | NR | NR | NR | NR | NR | NR | NR | NR | NR | NR | NR | NR | NR | - | NR |
| USA Today | NR | NR | NR | NR | NR | NR | NR | NR | NR | NR | NR | NR | NR | NR | NR | NR | NR | NR | NR | NR | NR | NR |

USCHO did not release a poll in week 20.

== Players drafted into the NHL ==
=== 2021 NHL entry draft ===
| Round | Pick | Player | NHL team |
|---|---|---|---|
| 2 | 37 | Josh Doan^{†} | Arizona Coyotes |
| 5 | 158 | Ty Murchison^{†} | Philadelphia Flyers |

† incoming freshman
