= 2016–17 Arizona State Sun Devils men's ice hockey season =

- Conference: Independent
- Home ice: Oceanside Ice Arena; Gila River Arena

Rankings
- USCHO.com: NR
- USA Today/ US Hockey Magazine: NR

Record
- Overall: 10–19–3
- Home: 5–6–0
- Road: 6–12–3
- Neutral: 0–1–1

Coaches and captains
- Head coach: Greg Powers
- Assistant coaches: Mike Field; Alex Hicks
- Captain: Dylan Hollman
- Alternate captain(s): Ryan Belonger; Anthony Croston; Louie Rowe

The 2016–17 Arizona State Sun Devils men's ice hockey season was the 2nd season of play for the program at the Division I level. The Sun Devils represented Arizona State University and were coached by Greg Powers, in his 8th season.

== Season ==
For the program's second varsity season, the team began by running a gauntlet of ranked teams. As a result, Arizona State's record was very poor to start the season. After a small reprieve in the middle of the year the team ran through another slate of ranked programs to end the season, however, the early-season difficulties appeared to have helped because the Sun Devils were able to win one and tie two matches against such opponents. Because of the team's recent entry into Division I, Arizona State had a difficult time scheduling games at the end of the year and were forced to play a series against a Division II program (Southern New Hampshire) and end the season with two weekends against non-NCAA teams.

Greg Powers did bring in the program's first big recruit in Joey Daccord and, though he did not help much in his freshman season, he would provide a massive boon to the Sun Devils in the near future.

== Departures ==
Player	Position	Nationality	Cause
Michael Cummings	Forward	United States	Returned to club team
Cody Gylling	Forward	United States	Retired
David Jacobson	Goaltender	United States	Transferred to SUNY Oswego
Matt Kennedy	Forward	United States	Transferred to Wentworth
Brock Krygier	Defenseman	United States	Graduation (Retired)
Sean Murphy	Forward	United States	Returned to club team
Liam Norris	Forward	Canada	Graduation (Retired)
Ryan Ostertag	Forward	Canada	Returned to club team
Garrett Peterson	Forward	United States	Graduation (Retired)
Eric Rivard	Forward	United States	Retired
Connor Schmidt	Defenseman	United States	Transferred to Utica
Ryan Stevens	Forward	United States	Transferred to Plymouth State
Charlie Zuccarini	Forward	United States	Transferred to Trinity

== Recruiting ==
Player	Position	Nationality	Age	Notes
Robert Baillargeon	Forward	United States	23	Enfield, CT; graduate transfer from Boston University
Tyler Busch	Forward	Canada	20	Lloydminster, AB
Joey Daccord	Goaltender	United States	20	North Andover, MA; selected 199th overall in the 2015 NHL entry draft
Georgi Gorodetsky	Forward	Russia	21	Yekaterinburg, RUS
Brett Gruber	Forward	United States	20	Appleton, WI
Jake Montgomery	Forward	United States	22	Oakdale, MN; transfer from Omaha
Wade Murphy	Forward	Canada	23	Victoria, BC; transfer from North Dakota
Brinson Pasichnuk	Defenseman	Canada	18	Bonnyville, AB
Steenn Pasichnuk	Forward	Canada	21	Bonnyville, AB
Riley Simpson	Forward	Canada	20	Edmonton, AB
Jakob Stridsberg	Defenseman	Sweden	21	Jönköping, SWE

== Roster ==
As of March 20, 2017.

No.	Nat.	Player	Class	Pos	Height	Weight	DoB	Hometown	Previous team	NHL rights
2	(United States)	Drew Newmeyer	Senior	D	5' 11" (1.8 m)	180 lb (82 kg)	1994-03-15	Scottsdale, Arizona	Indiana Ice (USHL)	—
4	(United States)	Ed McGovern	Junior	D	5' 10" (1.78 m)	178 lb (81 kg)	1993-05-24	Scottsdale, Arizona	Sioux Falls Stampede (USHL)	—
7	(Russia)	Georgi Gorodetsky	Freshman	F	6' 2" (1.88 m)	188 lb (85 kg)	1995-03-28	Yekaterinburg, Russia	Des Moines Buccaneers (USHL)	—
8	(United States)	Joe Lappin	Sophomore	F	6' 0" (1.83 m)	183 lb (83 kg)	1994-02-10	Geneva, Illinois	Des Moines Buccaneers (USHL)	—
9	(United States)	Robert Baillargeon	Graduate	F	6' 0" (1.83 m)	183 lb (83 kg)	1993-11-26	Enfield, Connecticut	Boston University (HEA)	OTT, 136 overall 2012
10	(Canada)	Tyler Busch	Freshman	F	6' 3" (1.91 m)	195 lb (88 kg)	1996-01-03	Lloydminster, Alberta	Spruce Grove Saints (AJHL)	—
11	(United States)	Jack Rowe	Sophomore	F	6' 1" (1.85 m)	185 lb (84 kg)	1994-04-07	Cary, Illinois	Des Moines Buccaneers (USPHL)	—
12	(Canada)	Dylan Hollman (C)	Sophomore (RS)	F	6' 1" (1.85 m)	185 lb (84 kg)	1994-01-15	Red Deer, Alberta	Massachusetts–Lowell (HEA)	—
13	(Canada)	Riley Simpson	Freshman	F	5' 10" (1.78 m)	178 lb (81 kg)	1996-07-23	Edmonton, Alberta	Spruce Grove Saints (AJHL)	—
14	(United States)	Jake Montgomery	Sophomore (RS)	F	6' 2" (1.88 m)	188 lb (85 kg)	1994-06-08	Oakdale, Minnesota	Sioux City Musketeers (USHL)	—
15	(Canada)	Wade Murphy	Junior (RS)	F	6' 0" (1.83 m)	183 lb (83 kg)	1993-10-22	Victoria, British Columbia	North Dakota (NCHC)	NSH, 185 overall 2013
16	(United States)	Ryan Belonger (A)	Senior (RS)	F	5' 10" (1.78 m)	178 lb (81 kg)	1992-05-05	Green Bay, Wisconsin	Northeastern (HEA)	—
17	(United States)	Jordan Masters	Sophomore	F	5' 11" (1.8 m)	180 lb (82 kg)	1994-04-30	Rochester, New York	West Kelowna Warriors (BCHL)	—
18	(United States)	Anthony Croston (A)	Sophomore	F	6' 0" (1.83 m)	183 lb (83 kg)	1994-06-13	Phoenix, Arizona	Rio Grande Valley Killer Bees (NAHL)	—
21	(Canada)	Dave Norris	Junior (RS)	F	6' 2" (1.88 m)	188 lb (85 kg)	1993-03-03	Calgary, Alberta	American International (AHA)	—
22	(United States)	Jake Clifford	Sophomore	D	6' 1" (1.85 m)	185 lb (84 kg)	1994-12-08	Brecksville, Ohio	Merritt Centennials (BCHL)	—
24	(United States)	Liam McGing	Sophomore	D	5' 11" (1.8 m)	180 lb (82 kg)	1995-08-04	Chicago, Illinois	Des Moines Buccaneers (USHL)	—
27	(United States)	Brett Gruber	Freshman	F	5' 8" (1.73 m)	180 lb (82 kg)	1996-01-18	Appleton, Wisconsin	Green Bay Gamblers (USHL)	—
28	(Canada)	Steenn Pasichnuk	Freshman	F	6' 4" (1.93 m)	219 lb (99 kg)	1995-04-05	Bonnyville, Alberta	Bonnyville Pontiacs (AJHL)	—
29	(Sweden)	Jakob Stridsberg	Freshman	D	6' 0" (1.83 m)	184 lb (83 kg)	1995-01-13	Jönköping, Sweden	Fairbanks Ice Dogs (NAHL)	—
31	(Canada)	Ryland Pashovitz	Sophomore	G	5' 11" (1.8 m)	180 lb (82 kg)	1995-06-20	Saskatoon, Saskatchewan	Des Moines Buccaneers (USHL)	—
32	(United States)	Louie Rowe (A)	Freshman (RS)	F	6' 6" (1.98 m)	198 lb (90 kg)	1994-03-17	East Lansing, Michigan	Omaha Lancers (USHL)	—
35	(United States)	Joey Daccord	Freshman	G	6' 2" (1.88 m)	188 lb (85 kg)	1996-08-19	North Andover, Massachusetts	Muskegon Lumberjacks (USHL)	OTT, 199 overall 2015
38	(United States)	Robert Levin	Senior	G	6' 1" (1.85 m)	185 lb (84 kg)	1992-09-22	Highland Park, Illinois	South Shore Kings (EJHL)	—
39	(Canada)	Brinson Pasichnuk	Freshman	D	5' 10" (1.78 m)	200 lb (91 kg)	1997-11-24	Bonnyville, Alberta	Bonnyville Pontiacs (AJHL)	—
44	(United States)	Joey Raats	Sophomore	D	6' 0" (1.83 m)	183 lb (83 kg)	1995-07-15	Las Vegas, Nevada	Sioux Falls Stampede (USHL)	—
47	(Canada)	Nicholas Gushue	Sophomore	D	6' 4" (1.93 m)	193 lb (88 kg)	1994-11-09	West Vancouver, British Columbia	Nanaimo Clippers (BCHL)	—

== Standings ==
2016–17 NCAA Division I Independent ice hockey standings
	Overall record					
	GP	W	L	T	GF	GA
Arizona State	32	10	19	3	91	130
Rankings: USCHO.com Top 20 Poll; updated February 20, 2017

== Schedule and results ==
Date	Time	Opponent^{#}	Rank^{#}	Site	TV	Decision	Result	Attendance	Record
Regular season
October 7	5:35 PM	at #9 Notre Dame*		Compton Family Ice Arena • Notre Dame, Indiana		Daccord	L 2–9	3,356	0–1–0
October 8	5:05 PM	at #9 Notre Dame*		Compton Family Ice Arena • Notre Dame, Indiana		Levin	L 2–4	3,554	0–2–0
October 14	7:05 PM	vs. #18 Air Force*		Gila River Arena • Glendale, Arizona		Daccord	L 3–4	1,753	0–3–0
October 16	2:35 PM	vs. #18 Air Force*		Gila River Arena • Glendale, Arizona	Pac-12 Network	Daccord	W 5–2	853	1–3–0
October 21	5:00 PM	at #17 Northeastern*		Matthews Arena • Boston, Massachusetts		Daccord	L 2–5	2,855	1–4–0
October 22	5:00 PM	at #17 Northeastern*		Matthews Arena • Boston, Massachusetts		Levin	L 1–6	3,325	1–5–0
October 28	7:05 PM	vs. #13 Harvard*		Gila River Arena • Glendale, Arizona	Pac-12 Network	Daccord	L 0–7	1,775	1–6–0
October 28	7:05 PM	vs. #13 Harvard*		Oceanside Ice Arena • Tempe, Arizona		Pashovitz	L 2–6	602	1–7–0
November 4	7:05 PM	vs. #17 Michigan*		Gila River Arena • Glendale, Arizona	Pac-12 Network	Daccord	L 1–4	3,252	1–8–0
November 12	5:00 PM	at New Hampshire*		Whittemore Center • Durham, New Hampshire		Levin	W 5–4 ^{OT}	3,935	2–8–0
November 13	1:00 PM	at #3 Boston College*		Conte Forum • Chestnut Hill, Massachusetts		Daccord	L 1–3	4,440	2–9–0
November 18	5:07 PM	at #10 Penn State*		Pegula Ice Arena • University Park, Pennsylvania		Pashovitz	L 4–7	5,801	2–10–0
November 19	1:07 PM	at #10 Penn State*		Pegula Ice Arena • University Park, Pennsylvania		Levin	L 0–8	5,799	2–11–0
November 25	7:05 PM	vs. Rensselaer*		Oceanside Ice Arena • Tempe, Arizona		Pashovitz	W 5–3	591	3–11–0
November 26	5:00 PM	vs. Rensselaer*		Oceanside Ice Arena • Tempe, Arizona		Levin	L 0–2	636	3–12–0
December 2	7:05 PM	vs. Colgate*		Oceanside Ice Arena • Tempe, Arizona		Pashovitz	W 5–4	674	4–12–0
December 3	7:05 PM	vs. Colgate*		Oceanside Ice Arena • Tempe, Arizona		Pashovitz	L 2–3	569	4–13–0
December 13	5:05 PM	at American International*		Olympia Ice Center • West Springfield, Massachusetts		Daccord	W 3–2	548	5–13–0
December 16	5:00 PM	at Massachusetts*		Mullins Center • Amherst, Massachusetts		Levin	W 4–1	2,166	6–13–0
December 17	5:00 PM	at Massachusetts*		Mullins Center • Amherst, Massachusetts		Levin	W 4–1	1,735	7–13–0
Desert Hockey Classic
December 30	7:25 PM	vs. Brown*		Prescott Valley Event Center • Prescott, Arizona (Desert Hockey Classic Semifinal)		Levin	T 8–8 ^{3x3 OTL}	1,153	7–13–1
December 31	7:10 PM	vs. #18 St. Cloud State*		Prescott Valley Event Center • Prescott, Arizona (Desert Hockey Classic Consolation)		Daccord	L 2–4	814	7–14–1
January 6	7:35 PM	at #3 Denver*		Magness Arena • Denver, Colorado	Altitude	Pashovitz	L 1–5	5,458	7–15–1
January 7	7:05 PM	at #3 Denver*		Magness Arena • Denver, Colorado		Pashovitz	L 1–6	5,980	7–16–1
January 13	5:05 PM	at #10 Ohio State*		Value City Arena • Columbus, Ohio		Pashovitz	L 1–6	4,535	7–17–1
January 14	12:03 PM	at #10 Ohio State*		Value City Arena • Columbus, Ohio	ESPN U	Levin	T 2–2 ^{SOW}	5,295	7–17–2
January 20	7:05 PM	vs. Southern New Hampshire*		Oceanside Ice Arena • Tempe, Arizona		Levin	W 11–0	753	8–17–2
January 21	7:05 PM	vs. Southern New Hampshire*		Oceanside Ice Arena • Tempe, Arizona		Levin	W 4–1	758	9–17–2
January 27	5:00 PM	at #17 Quinnipiac*		People's United Center • Hamden, Connecticut		Levin	L 2–5	3,144	9–18–2
January 28	5:00 PM	at #17 Quinnipiac*		People's United Center • Hamden, Connecticut		Daccord	W 4–2	2,986	10–18–2
February 3	5:05 PM	at #9 Western Michigan*		Lawson Arena • Kalamazoo, Michigan		Daccord	L 2–4	2,123	10–19–2
February 4	5:05 PM	at #9 Western Michigan*		Lawson Arena • Kalamazoo, Michigan		Daccord	T 2–2 ^{3x3 OTW}	2,839	10–19–3
Exhibition
February 10	5:07 PM	vs. Simon Fraser*		Oceanside Ice Arena • Tempe, Arizona (Exhibition)		Levin	W 8–1	758	
February 11	7:10 PM	vs. Simon Fraser*		Oceanside Ice Arena • Tempe, Arizona (Exhibition)		Levin	W 4–2	663	
February 24	5:00 PM	at USNTDP*		USA Hockey Arena • Plymouth, Michigan (Exhibition)		Daccord	L 3–5	534	
February 24	5:00 PM	at USNTDP*		USA Hockey Arena • Plymouth, Michigan (Exhibition)		Levin	W 6–3	497	
*Non-conference game. ^{#}Rankings from USCHO.com Poll. All times are in Mountain Time.

== Scoring Statistics ==
Name	Position	Games	Goals	Assists	Points	PIM
Anthony Croston	F	32	10	11	21	26
Robert Baillargeon	C	28	9	12	21	34
Wade Murphy	RW	31	9	11	20	30
Tyler Busch	C	32	9	11	20	58
Louie Rowe	F	32	7	10	17	28
Dylan Hollman	LW	32	5	12	17	8
Jakob Stridsberg	D	32	9	7	16	18
Brinson Pasichnuk	D	31	7	7	14	38
Brett Gruber	C	32	5	9	14	12
David Norris	F	22	3	9	12	8
Nicholas Gushue	D	24	4	5	9	20
Steenn Pasichnuk	RW	24	2	5	7	24
Joey Raats	D	21	1	6	7	16
Riley Simpson	RW/C	26	1	6	7	8
Liam McGing	D	27	0	7	7	28
Joe Lappin	F	25	3	3	6	10
Jack Rowe	F	19	4	1	5	16
Drew Newmeyer	D	19	0	5	5	0
Jordan Masters	RW	8	2	2	4	16
Jake Clifford	D	16	0	4	4	27
Georgy Gorodetsky	LW	11	0	3	3	4
Jake Montgomery	LW	19	0	2	2	29
Ryan Belonger	RW/C	10	1	0	1	8
Ryland Pashovitz	G	11	0	0	0	0
Robert Levin	G	13	0	0	0	0
Joey Daccord	G	15	0	0	0	0
Ed McGovern	D	23	0	0	0	49
Bench	-	-	-	-	-	10
Total			91	148	239	525

== Goaltending statistics ==
Name	Games	Minutes	Wins	Losses	Ties	Goals against	Saves	Shut outs	SV %	GAA
Robert Levin	13	705	5	5	2	39	343	1	.898	3.32
Joey Daccord	15	729	3	8	1	49	404	0	.892	4.03
Ryland Pashovitz	11	491	2	6	0	38	278	0	.880	4.64
Empty Net	-	9	-	-	-	4	-	-	-	-
Total	32	1935	10	19	3	130	1025	1	.887	4.03

== Rankings ==
Poll	Week																								
Poll	Pre	1	2	3	4	5	6	7	8	9	10	11	12	13	14	15	16	17	18	19	20	21	22	23	24 (Final)
USCHO.com	NR	NR	NR	NR	NR	NR	NR	NR	NR	NR	NR	NR	NR	NR	NR	NR	NR	NR	NR	NR	NR	NR	NR	–	NR
USA Today	NR	NR	NR	NR	NR	NR	NR	NR	NR	NR	NR	NR	NR	NR	NR	NR	NR	NR	NR	NR	NR	NR	NR	NR	NR

*USCHO did not release a poll in week 23.

== Players drafted into the NHL ==
=== 2017 NHL entry draft ===
No Arizona State players were selected in the NHL draft.
