= Fortress Invitational =

Collegiate ice hockey tournament

- Stadium: T-Mobile Arena
- Location: Las Vegas, Nevada
- Operated: 2018-present

Former names
- Ice Vegas Invitational (2018–2019)

The Fortress Invitational, formerly known as the Ice Vegas Invitational, is an annual mid-season college ice hockey tournament that has been held since 2018 at T-Mobile Arena on the Las Vegas Strip.

== History ==
The Ice Vegas Invitational was created by BD Global, a marketing firm that had produced various college sports events in the Las Vegas area, in partnership with MGM Resorts International, the operator of T-Mobile Arena. The organizers hoped that the tournament would attract the top college hockey teams in the country by its third year, fueled by growing appreciation of ice hockey in the area since the launch of the Vegas Golden Knights of the National Hockey League. They expected the Invitational to demonstrate the arena's viability as an eventual venue for the NCAA Men's Ice Hockey Championship (the "Frozen Four").

In 2017, Arizona State decided to cancel the Desert Hockey Classic in order to participate in the inaugural Ice Vegas Invitational. They won the tournament.

The 2020 tournament was renamed the Fortress Invitational (in reference to T-Mobile Arena's nickname, "The Fortress"), and was hosted by the Golden Knights. It was held January 3 and 4, 2020 and included Army, Cornell, Ohio State and Providence. Providence defeated Army 3-1 in the first round while Cornell defeated Ohio State 5-2.

== Yearly Results ==
Year	Champion	Runner-up	Third place	Fourth place	Ref
2018	Arizona State	Michigan Tech	Northern Michigan	Boston College	
2019	Western Michigan	Air Force	Connecticut	St. Lawrence	
2020	Providence	Cornell	Ohio State	Army	

== Team records ==
Team	# of times participated	Titles	Conference
Arizona State	1	1	Independent
Western Michigan	1	1	NCHC
Providence	1	1	Hockey East
Michigan Tech	1	0	CCHA
Air Force	1	0	Atlantic Hockey
Cornell	1	0	ECAC
Northern Michigan	1	0	CCHA
UConn	1	0	Hockey East
Ohio State	1	0	Big Ten
Boston College	1	0	Hockey East
Army	1	0	Atlantic Hockey
St. Lawrence	1	0	ECAC
