= 2017–18 Arizona State Sun Devils men's ice hockey season =

Ice Vegas Invitational, Champion
- Conference: Independent
- Home ice: Oceanside Ice Arena; Gila River Arena

Rankings
- USCHO.com: NR
- USA Today/ US Hockey Magazine: NR

Record
- Overall: 8–21–5
- Home: 4–9–1
- Road: 2–10–4
- Neutral: 2–2–0

Coaches and captains
- Head coach: Greg Powers
- Assistant coaches: Mike Field; Alex Hicks
- Captain: Dylan Hollman
- Alternate captain(s): Anthony Croston; Louie Rowe; Brinson Pasichnuk

The 2017–18 Arizona State Sun Devils men's ice hockey season was the 3rd season of play for the program at the Division I level. The Sun Devils represented Arizona State University and were coached by Greg Powers, in his 8th season.

== Season ==
Arizona State's record declined slightly from the year before, however, the team won its first in-season tournament by claiming the inaugural Ice Vegas Invitational championship.

== Departures ==
| Player | Position | Nationality | Cause |
|---|---|---|---|
| Robbie Baillargeon | Forward | United States | Graduation (Signed with South Carolina Stingrays) |
| Ryan Belonger | Forward | United States | Graduation (Retired) |
| Georgi Gorodetsky | Forward | Russia | Transferred to Wentworth |
| Robert Levin | Goaltender | United States | Graduation (Retired) |
| Jordan Masters | Forward | United States | Retired |
| Ed McGovern | Defenseman | United States | Retired |
| Jake Montgomery | Forward | United States | Retired |
| Wade Murphy | Forward | Canada | Graduation (Signed with Manchester Monarchs) |
| Drew Newmeyer | Defenseman | United States | Graduation (Retired) |

== Recruiting ==
| Player | Position | Nationality | Age | Notes |
|---|---|---|---|---|
| Max Balinson | Defenseman | Canada | 20 | Ancaster, ON |
| Filips Buncis | Forward | Latvia | 20 | Jelgava, LAT |
| Mike DePhillips | Goaltender | United States | 20 | Summit, NJ |
| Dominic Garcia | Forward | United States | 20 | Las Vegas, NV |
| Gage Hough | Forward | United States | 24 | Omaha, NE; transfer from Massachusetts–Lowell |
| Gvido Jansons | Defenseman | Latvia | 20 | Liepāja, LAT |
| Austin Lemieux | Forward | United States | 21 | Sewickley, PA; red shirt |
| Gage Mackie | Forward | United States | 20 | Anchorage, AK; red shirt |
| Johnny Walker | Forward | United States | 21 | Phoenix, AZ |
| Jacob Wilson | Defenseman | United States | 20 | Ballwin, MO |

== Roster ==
As of March 20, 2018.

| No. | Nat. | Player | Class | Pos | Height | Weight | DoB | Hometown | Previous team | NHL rights |
|---|---|---|---|---|---|---|---|---|---|---|
| 3 | (Latvia) | Gvido Jansons | Freshman | D | 6' 4" (1.93 m) | 210 lb (95 kg) | 1997-01-09 | Grobiņa, Latvia | Aston Rebels (NAHL) | — |
| 4 | (United States) | Jacob Wilson | Freshman | D | 5' 11" (1.8 m) | 185 lb (84 kg) | 1997-02-27 | Ballwin, Missouri | Sioux City Musketeers (USHL) | — |
| 7 | (United States) | Johnny Walker | Freshman | F | 6' 1" (1.85 m) | 185 lb (84 kg) | 1996-08-21 | Phoenix, Arizona | Chicago Steel (USHL) | — |
| 8 | (United States) | Joe Lappin | Junior | F | 6' 0" (1.83 m) | 183 lb (83 kg) | 1994-02-10 | Geneva, Illinois | Des Moines Buccaneers (USHL) | — |
| 10 | (Canada) | Tyler Busch | Sophomore | F | 6' 3" (1.91 m) | 195 lb (88 kg) | 1996-01-03 | Lloydminster, Alberta | Spruce Grove Saints (AJHL) | — |
| 11 | (United States) | Jack Rowe | Junior | F | 6' 1" (1.85 m) | 185 lb (84 kg) | 1994-04-07 | Cary, Illinois | Des Moines Buccaneers (USPHL) | — |
| 12 | (Canada) | Dylan Hollman (C) | Junior (RS) | F | 6' 1" (1.85 m) | 185 lb (84 kg) | 1994-01-15 | Red Deer, Alberta | Massachusetts–Lowell (HEA) | — |
| 13 | (Canada) | Riley Simpson | Sophomore | F | 5' 10" (1.78 m) | 178 lb (81 kg) | 1996-07-23 | Edmonton, Alberta | Spruce Grove Saints (AJHL) | — |
| 15 | (United States) | Gage Hough | Senior | F | 6' 0" (1.83 m) | 183 lb (83 kg) | 1993-03-27 | Omaha, Nebraska | Massachusetts–Lowell (HEA) | — |
| 17 | (Latvia) | Filips Buncis | Freshman | F | 6' 4" (1.93 m) | 210 lb (95 kg) | 1997-06-12 | Jelgava, Latvia | Johnstown Tomahawks (NAHL) | — |
| 18 | (United States) | Anthony Croston (A) | Junior | F | 6' 0" (1.83 m) | 183 lb (83 kg) | 1994-06-13 | Phoenix, Arizona | Rio Grande Valley Killer Bees (NAHL) | — |
| 21 | (Canada) | Dave Norris | Senior (RS) | F | 6' 2" (1.88 m) | 188 lb (85 kg) | 1993-03-03 | Calgary, Alberta | American International (AHA) | — |
| 22 | (United States) | Jake Clifford | Junior | D | 6' 1" (1.85 m) | 185 lb (84 kg) | 1994-12-08 | Brecksville, Ohio | Merritt Centennials (BCHL) | — |
| 24 | (United States) | Liam McGing | Junior | D | 5' 11" (1.8 m) | 180 lb (82 kg) | 1995-08-04 | Chicago, Illinois | Des Moines Buccaneers (USHL) | — |
| 26 | (Canada) | Max Balinson | Freshman | D | 6' 0" (1.83 m) | 185 lb (84 kg) | 1996-10-05 | Ancaster, Ontario | Burlington Cougars (OJHL) | — |
| 27 | (United States) | Brett Gruber | Sophomore | F | 5' 8" (1.73 m) | 180 lb (82 kg) | 1996-01-18 | Appleton, Wisconsin | Green Bay Gamblers (USHL) | — |
| 28 | (Canada) | Steenn Pasichnuk | Sophomore | F | 6' 4" (1.93 m) | 219 lb (99 kg) | 1995-04-05 | Bonnyville, Alberta | Bonnyville Pontiacs (AJHL) | — |
| 29 | (Sweden) | Jakob Stridsberg | Sophomore | D | 6' 0" (1.83 m) | 184 lb (83 kg) | 1995-01-13 | Jönköping, Sweden | Fairbanks Ice Dogs (NAHL) | — |
| 31 | (Canada) | Ryland Pashovitz | Junior | G | 5' 11" (1.8 m) | 180 lb (82 kg) | 1995-06-20 | Saskatoon, Saskatchewan | Des Moines Buccaneers (USHL) | — |
| 32 | (United States) | Louie Rowe (A) | Sophomore (RS) | F | 6' 6" (1.98 m) | 198 lb (90 kg) | 1994-03-17 | East Lansing, Michigan | Omaha Lancers (USHL) | — |
| 33 | (United States) | Mike DePhillips | Freshman | G | 5' 11" (1.8 m) | 180 lb (82 kg) | 1997-08-22 | Summit, New Jersey | P.A.L. Junior Islanders (USPHL) | — |
| 35 | (United States) | Joey Daccord | Sophomore | G | 6' 2" (1.88 m) | 188 lb (85 kg) | 1996-08-19 | North Andover, Massachusetts | Muskegon Lumberjacks (USHL) | OTT, 199 overall 2015 |
| 37 | (United States) | Dominic Garcia | Freshman | F | 5' 11" (1.8 m) | 190 lb (86 kg) | 1996-10-30 | Las Vegas, Nevada | Aston Rebels (NAHL) | — |
| 39 | (Canada) | Brinson Pasichnuk (A) | Sophomore | D | 5' 10" (1.78 m) | 200 lb (91 kg) | 1997-11-24 | Bonnyville, Alberta | Bonnyville Pontiacs (AJHL) | — |
| 44 | (United States) | Joey Raats | Junior | D | 6' 0" (1.83 m) | 183 lb (83 kg) | 1995-07-15 | Las Vegas, Nevada | Sioux Falls Stampede (USHL) | — |
| 47 | (Canada) | Nicholas Gushue | Junior | D | 6' 4" (1.93 m) | 193 lb (88 kg) | 1994-11-09 | West Vancouver, British Columbia | Nanaimo Clippers (BCHL) | — |

== Standings ==
2017–18 NCAA Division I Independent ice hockey standings
| | Overall record | | | | | |
| | GP | W | L | T | GF | GA |
|---|---|---|---|---|---|---|
| Arizona State | 34 | 8 | 21 | 5 | 77 | 123 |
Rankings: USCHO.com Top 20 Poll; updated April 20, 2018

== Schedule and results ==
| Date | Time | Opponent^{#} | Rank^{#} | Site | TV | Decision | Result | Attendance | Record |
Exhibition
| September 30 | 7:05 PM | vs. NAIT* | | Oceanside Ice Arena • Tempe, Arizona | | Daccord | W 4–1 | 846 | |
Regular season
| October 6 | 7:05 PM | vs. Massachusetts* | | Oceanside Ice Arena • Tempe, Arizona | | Daccord | W 5–3 | 758 | 1–0–0 |
| October 7 | 7:05 PM | vs. Massachusetts* | | Oceanside Ice Arena • Tempe, Arizona | | Daccord | L 2–4 | 694 | 1–1–0 |
| October 13 | 7:05 PM | at #19 Air Force* | | Cadet Ice Arena • Colorado Springs, Colorado | | Daccord | L 3–4 | 2,494 | 1–2–0 |
| October 14 | 7:05 PM | at #19 Air Force* | | Cadet Ice Arena • Colorado Springs, Colorado | | Daccord | L 2–3 | 2,437 | 1–3–0 |
| October 20 | 6:07 PM | at Omaha* | | Baxter Arena • Omaha, Nebraska | | Pashovitz | L 1–5 | 4,640 | 1–4–0 |
| October 21 | 6:07 PM | at Omaha* | | Baxter Arena • Omaha, Nebraska | | Daccord | T 4–4 ^{SOW} | 4,631 | 1–4–1 |
| October 27 | 5:07 PM | at Colgate* | | Class of 1965 Arena • Hamilton, New York | | Daccord | L 0–3 | 2,136 | 1–5–1 |
| October 28 | 3:05 PM | at Colgate* | | Class of 1965 Arena • Hamilton, New York | | Daccord | T 1–1 ^{OT} | 2,222 | 1–5–2 |
| November 3 | 7:05 PM | vs. Alabama–Huntsville* | | Oceanside Ice Arena • Tempe, Arizona | | Daccord | W 3–2 | 738 | 2–5–2 |
| November 4 | 7:05 PM | vs. Alabama–Huntsville* | | Oceanside Ice Arena • Tempe, Arizona | | Daccord | L 1–3 | 711 | 2–6–2 |
| November 17 | 8:05 PM | vs. Penn State* | | Gila River Arena • Glendale, Arizona | | Daccord | L 0–7 | 2,842 | 2–7–2 |
| November 18 | 7:05 PM | vs. Penn State* | | Gila River Arena • Glendale, Arizona | | Daccord | L 2–4 | 3,104 | 2–8–2 |
| November 24 | 5:05 PM | at Holy Cross* | | Hart Center • Worcester, Massachusetts | | Daccord | W 3–1 | 1,132 | 3–8–2 |
| November 25 | 5:05 PM | at Holy Cross* | | Hart Center • Worcester, Massachusetts | | Daccord | T 2–2 ^{OT} | 1,007 | 3–8–3 |
| December 8 | 7:05 PM | vs. Princeton* | | Oceanside Ice Arena • Tempe, Arizona | | Daccord | L 0–4 | 861 | 3–9–3 |
| December 9 | 7:05 PM | vs. Princeton* | | Oceanside Ice Arena • Tempe, Arizona | | Daccord | W 4–3 ^{OT} | 750 | 4–9–3 |
| December 16 | 6:07 PM | at Colorado College* | | Broadmoor World Arena • Colorado Springs, Colorado | CET | Daccord | L 0–4 | 3,687 | 4–10–3 |
| December 17 | 2:09 PM | at Colorado College* | | Broadmoor World Arena • Colorado Springs, Colorado | | Daccord | T 4–4 ^{SOL} | 4,135 | 4–10–4 |
Three Rivers Classic
| December 29 | 2:35 PM | vs. #11 Providence* | | PPG Paints Arena • Pittsburgh, Pennsylvania (Three Rivers Classic Semifinal) | | Daccord | L 0–6 | 2,115 | 4–11–4 |
| December 30 | 2:35 PM | vs. Lake Superior State* | | PPG Paints Arena • Pittsburgh, Pennsylvania (Three Rivers Classic Consolation) | | Pashovitz | L 1–4 | 2,126 | 4–12–4 |
Ice Vegas Invitational
| January 5 | 9:30 PM | vs. Northern Michigan* | | T-Mobile Arena • Las Vegas, Nevada (Ice Vegas Semifinal) | | Daccord | W 7–3 | 2,507 | 5–12–4 |
| January 6 | 9:30 PM | vs. Michigan Tech* | | T-Mobile Arena • Las Vegas, Nevada (Ice Vegas Championship) | | Daccord | W 3–2 | 2,237 | 6–12–4 |
| January 12 | 7:05 PM | vs. Massachusetts–Lowell* | | Oceanside Ice Arena • Tempe, Arizona | | Daccord | L 0–4 | 777 | 6–13–4 |
| January 13 | 7:05 PM | vs. Massachusetts–Lowell* | | Oceanside Ice Arena • Tempe, Arizona | | Daccord | W 4–0 | 752 | 7–13–4 |
| January 19 | 7:05 PM | vs. Quinnipiac* | | Oceanside Ice Arena • Tempe, Arizona | | Daccord | T 2–2 ^{OT} | 741 | 7–13–5 |
| January 20 | 7:05 PM | vs. Quinnipiac* | | Gila River Arena • Glendale, Arizona | | Daccord | L 3–5 | 2,696 | 7–14–5 |
| January 26 | 7:05 PM | at Boston University* | | Gila River Arena • Glendale, Arizona | | Daccord | L 0–8 | 3,118 | 7–15–5 |
| January 27 | 7:05 PM | at Boston University* | | Oceanside Ice Arena • Tempe, Arizona | | Daccord | L 3–4 | 765 | 7–16–5 |
| February 2 | 5:00 PM | at Yale* | | Ingalls Rink • New Haven, Connecticut | | Daccord | L 2–3 ^{OT} | 2,939 | 7–17–5 |
| February 3 | 5:00 PM | at Yale* | | Ingalls Rink • New Haven, Connecticut | | Daccord | L 3–4 ^{OT} | 3,219 | 7–18–5 |
| February 16 | 5:07 PM | at Michigan Tech* | | MacInnes Student Ice Arena • Houghton, Michigan | | Daccord | W 2–1 ^{OT} | 2,438 | 8–18–5 |
| February 17 | 5:07 PM | at Michigan Tech* | | MacInnes Student Ice Arena • Houghton, Michigan | | Daccord | L 3–5 | 3,733 | 8–19–5 |
| February 23 | 5:31 PM | at #13 Michigan* | | Yost Ice Arena • Ann Arbor, Michigan | | Daccord | L 3–5 | 5,800 | 8–20–5 |
| February 24 | 5:31 PM | at #13 Michigan* | | Yost Ice Arena • Ann Arbor, Michigan | | Daccord | L 3–5 | 5,800 | 8–21–5 |
*Non-conference game. ^{#}Rankings from USCHO.com Poll. All times are in Mountain Time.

== Scoring Statistics ==
| Name | Position | Games | Goals | Assists | Points | PIM |
|---|---|---|---|---|---|---|
| Brinson Pasichnuk | D | 34 | 8 | 18 | 26 | 56 |
| Brett Gruber | C | 34 | 5 | 20 | 25 | 8 |
| Johnny Walker | RW | 32 | 17 | 7 | 24 | 45 |
| Dave Norris | F | 30 | 5 | 11 | 16 | 6 |
| Tyler Busch | C | 29 | 7 | 8 | 15 | 79 |
| Anthony Croston | F | 33 | 6 | 9 | 15 | 44 |
| Jacob Wilson | D | 34 | 3 | 9 | 12 | 39 |
| Max Balinson | D | 26 | 3 | 8 | 11 | 4 |
| Jakob Stridsberg | D | 32 | 5 | 4 | 9 | 12 |
| Dylan Hollman | LW | 33 | 3 | 4 | 7 | 27 |
| Louie Rowe | F | 32 | 2 | 5 | 7 | 41 |
| Joey Raats | D | 30 | 2 | 4 | 6 | 28 |
| Joe Lappin | F | 22 | 0 | 6 | 6 | 6 |
| Jake Clifford | D | 32 | 2 | 3 | 5 | 24 |
| Dominic Garcia | F | 33 | 2 | 2 | 4 | 32 |
| Steenn Pasichnuk | RW | 21 | 1 | 3 | 4 | 33 |
| Gage Hough | F | 14 | 2 | 1 | 3 | 10 |
| Gvido Jansons | D | 34 | 2 | 0 | 2 | 14 |
| Jack Rowe | F | 16 | 1 | 1 | 2 | 4 |
| Joey Daccord | G | 32 | 0 | 2 | 2 | 0 |
| Filips Buncis | C | 22 | 1 | 0 | 1 | 8 |
| Liam McGing | D | 14 | 0 | 1 | 1 | 0 |
| Mike DePhillips | G | 1 | 0 | 0 | 0 | 0 |
| Ryland Pashovitz | G | 4 | 0 | 0 | 0 | 0 |
| Nicholas Gushue | D | 5 | 0 | 0 | 0 | 0 |
| Riley Simpson | RW/C | 20 | 0 | 0 | 0 | 0 |
| Bench | - | - | - | - | - | 10 |
| Total | | | 77 | 126 | 203 | 541 |

== Goaltending statistics ==
| Name | Games | Minutes | Wins | Losses | Ties | Goals against | Saves | Shut outs | SV % | GAA |
|---|---|---|---|---|---|---|---|---|---|---|
| Ryland Pashovitz | 4 | 177 | 0 | 2 | 0 | 8 | 72 | 0 | .900 | 2.70 |
| Mike DePhillips | 1 | 20 | 0 | 0 | 0 | 1 | 13 | 0 | .529 | 3.00 |
| Joey Daccord | 32 | 1864 | 8 | 19 | 5 | 109 | 1084 | 1 | .909 | 3.51 |
| Empty Net | - | 13 | - | - | - | 5 | - | - | - | - |
| Total | 34 | 2074 | 8 | 21 | 5 | 123 | 1169 | 1 | .905 | 3.56 |

== Rankings ==
| Poll | Week | | | | | | | | | | | | | | | | | | | | | | | | |
| Poll | Pre | 1 | 2 | 3 | 4 | 5 | 6 | 7 | 8 | 9 | 10 | 11 | 12 | 13 | 14 | 15 | 16 | 17 | 18 | 19 | 20 | 21 | 22 | 23 | 24 (Final) |
|---|---|---|---|---|---|---|---|---|---|---|---|---|---|---|---|---|---|---|---|---|---|---|---|---|---|
| USCHO.com | NR | – | NR | NR | NR | NR | NR | NR | NR | NR | NR | NR | NR | NR | NR | NR | NR | NR | NR | NR | NR | NR | NR | NR | NR |
| USA Today | NR | NR | NR | NR | NR | NR | NR | NR | NR | NR | NR | NR | NR | NR | NR | NR | NR | NR | NR | NR | NR | NR | NR | NR | NR |

*USCHO did not release a poll in week 1.

== Players drafted into the NHL ==
=== 2018 NHL entry draft ===
| Round | Pick | Player | NHL team |
|---|---|---|---|
| 4 | 108 | Demetrios Koumontzis^{†} | Calgary Flames |

† incoming freshman
