= 2019–20 Arizona State Sun Devils men's ice hockey season =

- Conference: Independent
- Home ice: Oceanside Ice Arena; Gila River Arena

Rankings
- USCHO.com: 13
- USA Today/ US Hockey Magazine: 13

Record
- Overall: 22–11–3
- Home: 12–2–2
- Road: 10–8–0
- Neutral: 0–1–1

Coaches and captains
- Head coach: Greg Powers
- Assistant coaches: Mike Field; Alex Hicks; Eddie Läck
- Captain(s): Tyler Busch; Brinson Pasichnuk
- Alternate captain(s): Jacob Wilson; Dominic Garcia

The 2019–20 Arizona State Sun Devils men's ice hockey season was the 5th season of play for the program at the Division I level. The Sun Devils represented Arizona State University and were coached by Greg Powers, in his 10th season.

== Departures ==
Player	Position	Nationality	Cause
Jake Clifford	Defenseman	United States	Graduation (Signed with Tulsa Oilers)
Anthony Croston	Forward	United States	Graduation (Retired)
Joey Daccord	Goaltender	United States	Signed Professional Contract (Ottawa Senators)
Mike DePhillips	Goaltender	United States	Retired
Dylan Hollman	Forward	Canada	Graduation (Retired)
Gage Mackie	Forward	United States	Retired
Jack Rowe	Forward	United States	Graduation (Retired)
Louie Rowe	Forward	United States	Graduation (Signed with Maine Mariners)
Riley Simpson	Forward	Canada	Retired
Jakob Stridsberg	Defenseman	Sweden	Signed Professional Contract (HC Vita Hästen)

== Recruiting ==
Player	Position	Nationality	Age	Notes
Jack Judson	Defenseman	Canada	19	White Rock, BC
Jax Murray	Forward	United States	20	Princeton, MN
Max Prawdzik	Goaltender	United States	22	Andover, MA; graduate transfer from Boston University
Justin Robbins	Goaltender	United States	20	Alpine, NJ
James Sanchez	Forward	United States	21	Northbrook, IL; transfer from Michigan
Jacob Semik	Defenseman	United States	19	Canton, MI

== Roster ==
As of December 20, 2019.

No.	Nat.	Player	Class	Pos	Height	Weight	DoB	Hometown	Previous team	NHL rights
2	(United States)	Connor Stuart	Sophomore	D	6' 2" (1.88 m)	190 lb (86 kg)	1997-02-12	Phoenix, Arizona	Lone Star Brahmas (NAHL)	—
3	(Latvia)	Gvido Jansons	Junior	D	6' 4" (1.93 m)	210 lb (95 kg)	1997-01-09	Grobiņa, Latvia	Aston Rebels (NAHL)	—
4	(United States)	Jacob Wilson (A)	Junior	D	5' 11" (1.8 m)	185 lb (84 kg)	1997-02-27	Ballwin, Missouri	Sioux City Musketeers (USHL)	—
7	(United States)	Johnny Walker	Junior	F	6' 1" (1.85 m)	185 lb (84 kg)	1996-08-21	Phoenix, Arizona	Chicago Steel (USHL)	—
10	(Canada)	Tyler Busch (C)	Senior	F	6' 3" (1.91 m)	195 lb (88 kg)	1996-01-03	Lloydminster, Alberta	Spruce Grove Saints (AJHL)	—
16	(United States)	Austin Lemieux	Sophomore (RS)	F	6' 3" (1.91 m)	170 lb (77 kg)	1996-03-24	Sewickley, Pennsylvania	Islanders Hockey Club (USPHL)	—
17	(United States)	Jacob Semik	Freshman	D	6' 0" (1.83 m)	180 lb (82 kg)	2000-03-10	Canton, Michigan	Dubuque Fighting Saints (USHL)	—
18	(United States)	Jax Murray	Freshman	F	5' 9" (1.75 m)	185 lb (84 kg)	1998-12-26	Princeton, Minnesota	Fairbanks Ice Dogs (NAHL)	—
19	(Canada)	Jordan Sandhu	Sophomore	F	5' 7" (1.7 m)	155 lb (70 kg)	1999-05-13	Richmond, British Columbia	Vernon Vipers (BCHL)	—
20	(Latvia)	Filips Buncis	Junior	F	6' 4" (1.93 m)	210 lb (95 kg)	1997-06-12	Jelgava, Latvia	Johnstown Tomahawks (NAHL)	—
21	(China)	Peter Zhong	Freshman (RS)	F	5' 11" (1.8 m)	175 lb (79 kg)	1998-07-30	Beijing, China	Philadelphia Rebels (NAHL)	—
22	(Canada)	Jack Judson	Freshman	D	6' 0" (1.83 m)	180 lb (82 kg)	2000-02-26	White Rock, British Columbia	Vernon Vipers (BCHL)	—
23	(United States)	Demetrios Koumontzis	Sophomore	F	5' 10" (1.78 m)	180 lb (82 kg)	2000-03-24	Scottsdale, Arizona	Edina High School (USHS–MN)	CGY, 108th overall 2018
24	(United States)	Joshua Maniscalco	Sophomore	D	6' 2" (1.88 m)	205 lb (93 kg)	1999-02-17	Perkiomenville, Pennsylvania	Dubuque Fighting Saints (USHL)	—
25	(Canada)	P.J. Marrocco	Sophomore	F	5' 8" (1.73 m)	165 lb (75 kg)	1997-08-27	Edmonton, Alberta	Chilliwack Chiefs (BCHL)	—
26	(Canada)	Max Balinson	Junior	D	6' 0" (1.83 m)	185 lb (84 kg)	1996-10-05	Ancaster, Ontario	Burlington Cougars (OJHL)	—
27	(United States)	Brett Gruber	Senior	F	5' 8" (1.73 m)	180 lb (82 kg)	1996-01-18	Appleton, Wisconsin	Green Bay Gamblers (USHL)	—
28	(Canada)	Steenn Pasichnuk	Senior	F	6' 4" (1.93 m)	219 lb (99 kg)	1995-04-05	Bonnyville, Alberta	Bonnyville Pontiacs (AJHL)	—
29	(United States)	William Knierim	Junior	F	6' 4" (1.93 m)	225 lb (102 kg)	1998-01-22	Skokie, Illinois	Dubuque Fighting Saints (USHL)	—
30	(Canada)	Evan DeBrouwer	Sophomore	G	6' 3" (1.91 m)	190 lb (86 kg)	1997-01-30	Blenheim, Ontario	Prince George Spruce Kings (BCHL)	—
31	(United States)	Justin Robbins	Freshman	G	5' 9" (1.75 m)	172 lb (78 kg)	1999-03-10	Alpine, New Jersey	Chicago Steel (USHL)	—
37	(United States)	Dominic Garcia (A)	Junior	F	5' 11" (1.8 m)	190 lb (86 kg)	1996-10-30	Las Vegas, Nevada	Aston Rebels (NAHL)	—
39	(Canada)	Brinson Pasichnuk (C)	Senior	D	5' 10" (1.78 m)	200 lb (91 kg)	1997-11-24	Bonnyville, Alberta	Bonnyville Pontiacs (AJHL)	—
45	(United States)	Max Prawdzik	Graduate	G	6' 3" (1.91 m)	170 lb (77 kg)	1997-02-22	Andover, Massachusetts	Boston University Terriers (HEA)	—
60	(Canada)	Jarrod Gourley	Sophomore	D	6' 2" (1.88 m)	207 lb (94 kg)	1999-06-29	Calgary, Alberta	Spruce Grove Saints (AJHL)	—
61	(United States)	James Sanchez	Junior	F	6' 2" (1.88 m)	195 lb (88 kg)	1998-02-25	Northbrook, Illinois	Dubuque Fighting Saints (USHL)	—

== Standings ==
2019–20 NCAA Division I Independent ice hockey standings
	Overall record					
	GP	W	L	T	GF	GA
#14 Arizona State	36	22	11	3	121	97
Rankings: USCHO.com Top 20 Poll; updated March 1, 2020

== Schedule and results ==
Date	Time	Opponent^{#}	Rank^{#}	Site	TV	Decision	Result	Attendance	Record
Regular season
October 5	7:05 PM	vs. Mercyhurst*	#20	Oceanside Ice Arena • Tempe, Arizona		Debrouwer	L 2–3	924	0–1–0
October 6	3:00 PM	vs. Mercyhurst*	#20	Oceanside Ice Arena • Tempe, Arizona		Prawdzik	W 6–4	815	1–1–0
October 11	6:07 PM	at #3 Minnesota State*		Mankato Civic Center • Mankato, Minnesota		Debrouwer	L 1–4	4,216	1–2–0
October 12	5:07 PM	at #3 Minnesota State*		Mankato Civic Center • Mankato, Minnesota		Debrouwer	L 0–5	4,439	1–3–0
October 18	7:05 PM	at Air Force*		Cadet Ice Arena • Colorado Springs, Colorado		Debrouwer	W 3–0	2,028	2–3–0
October 19	7:05 PM	at Air Force*		Cadet Ice Arena • Colorado Springs, Colorado		Debrouwer	W 5–2	1,966	3–3–0
November 1	7:05 PM	vs. #9 Quinnipiac*		Oceanside Ice Arena • Tempe, Arizona		Debrouwer	W 5–3	901	4–3–0
November 2	7:05 PM	vs. #9 Quinnipiac*		Oceanside Ice Arena • Tempe, Arizona		Debrouwer	W 4–1	915	5–3–0
November 8	9:07 PM	at Alaska*		Carlson Center • Fairbanks, Alaska		Debrouwer	L 3–4	1,283	5–4–0
November 9	9:07 PM	at Alaska*		Carlson Center • Fairbanks, Alaska		Debrouwer	W 4–0	1,613	6–4–0
November 29	5:05 PM	vs. Vermont*		Oceanside Ice Arena • Tempe, Arizona		Debrouwer	W 2–1	845	7–4–0
November 30	7:05 PM	vs. Vermont*		Oceanside Ice Arena • Tempe, Arizona		Debrouwer	T 2–2 ^{OT}	800	7–4–1
December 6	7:05 PM	vs. #4 Denver*	#20	Oceanside Ice Arena • Tempe, Arizona		Debrouwer	W 4–1	917	8–4–1
December 7	4:35 PM	vs. #4 Denver*	#20	Gila River Arena • Glendale, Arizona		Debrouwer	T 2–2 ^{OT}	2,800	8–4–2
December 14	5:00 PM	at #18 Michigan State*	#16	Munn Ice Arena • East Lansing, Michigan		Debrouwer	W 4–3	5,306	9–4–2
December 15	3:00 PM	at #18 Michigan State*	#16	Munn Ice Arena • East Lansing, Michigan		Debrouwer	L 0–1 ^{OT}	5,004	9–5–2
December 21	6:07 PM	at Omaha*	#16	Baxter Arena • Omaha, Nebraska		Debrouwer	W 5–4	5,479	10–5–2
December 22	3:07 PM	at Omaha*	#16	Baxter Arena • Omaha, Nebraska		Debrouwer	L 4–8	5,294	10–6–2
December 28	5:00 PM	vs. #17 Harvard*	#16	FivePoint Arena • Irvine, California		Debrouwer	L 1–4	2,253	10–7–2
December 29	2:00 PM	vs. #17 Harvard*	#16	FivePoint Arena • Irvine, California		Debrouwer	T 4–4 ^{OT}	1,744	10–7–3
January 4	7:05 PM	vs. Michigan Tech*	#17	Oceanside Ice Arena • Tempe, Arizona		Debrouwer	W 4–3	768	11–7–3
January 5	3:00 PM	vs. Michigan Tech*	#17	Oceanside Ice Arena • Tempe, Arizona		Debrouwer	L 2–3	796	11–8–3
January 11	5:00 PM	at Brown*	#15	Meehan Auditorium • Providence, Rhode Island		Debrouwer	W 3–1	636	12–8–3
January 12	2:00 PM	at Brown*	#15	Meehan Auditorium • Providence, Rhode Island	NESN	Debrouwer	W 4–3 ^{OT}	454	13–8–3
January 17	7:05 PM	vs. RIT*	#14	Oceanside Ice Arena • Tempe, Arizona		Prawdzik	W 6–1	867	14–8–3
January 18	7:05 PM	vs. RIT*	#14	Oceanside Ice Arena • Tempe, Arizona		Debrouwer	W 5–3	817	15–8–3
January 24	5:00 PM	at #8 Clarkson*	#13	Cheel Arena • Potsdam, New York		Debrouwer	L 1–2 ^{OT}	2,927	15–9–3
January 25	5:00 PM	at #8 Clarkson*	#13	Cheel Arena • Potsdam, New York		Debrouwer	W 3–2 ^{OT}	3,132	16–9–3
January 31	7:05 PM	vs. Robert Morris*	#12	Oceanside Ice Arena • Tempe, Arizona		Debrouwer	W 3–2	880	17–9–3
February 1	7:05 PM	vs. Robert Morris*	#12	Oceanside Ice Arena • Tempe, Arizona		Debrouwer	W 5–4	917	18–9–3
February 7	5:05 PM	at Holy Cross*	#11	Hart Center • Worcester, Massachusetts		Debrouwer	W 3–2 ^{OT}	1,905	19–9–3
February 8	5:05 PM	at Bentley*	#11	Bentley Arena • Waltham, Massachusetts		Debrouwer	W 3–0	1,866	20–9–3
February 14	7:05 PM	vs. Alaska Anchorage*	#10	Oceanside Ice Arena • Tempe, Arizona		Debrouwer	W 5–0	897	21–9–3
February 15	7:05 PM	vs. Alaska Anchorage*	#10	Oceanside Ice Arena • Tempe, Arizona		Debrouwer	W 5–2	936	22–9–3
February 21	6:00 PM	at Wisconsin*	#9	Kohl Center • Madison, Wisconsin		Debrouwer	L 6–7	9,249	22–10–3
February 22	6:00 PM	at Wisconsin*	#9	Kohl Center • Madison, Wisconsin		Debrouwer	L 2–6	12,856	22–11–3
*Non-conference game. ^{#}Rankings from USCHO.com Poll. All times are in Mountain Time.

== Scoring Statistics ==
Name	Position	Games	Goals	Assists	Points	PIM
James Sanchez	LW	36	10	30	40	24
Johnny Walker	RW	36	20	18	38	22
Brinson Pasichnuk	D	36	11	26	37	18
Joshua Maniscalco	D	36	11	21	32	38
Willie Knierim	RW	36	15	9	24	51
P. J. Marrocco	F	36	13	8	21	18
Tyler Busch	C	36	3	18	21	41
Jordan Sandhu	C	36	5	13	18	6
Brett Gruber	C	31	6	10	16	10
Austin Lemieux	RW	35	3	11	14	26
Filips Buncis	C	32	4	8	12	10
Jack Judson	D	34	4	7	11	31
Jacob Wilson	D	29	3	8	11	20
Jacob Semik	D	36	2	7	9	25
Demetrios Koumontzis	LW	25	3	5	8	21
Jarrod Gourley	D	35	2	6	8	29
Logan Jenuwine	F	10	3	1	4	8
Gvido Jansons	D	23	2	2	4	16
Dominic Garcia	F	29	0	4	4	18
Steenn Pasichnuk	RW	35	1	1	2	29
Connor Stuart	D/F	24	0	1	1	4
Justin Robbins	G	1	0	0	0	0
Jax Murray	F	4	0	0	0	0
Max Prawdzik	G	9	0	0	0	0
Peter Zhong	LW	11	0	0	0	0
Evan Debrouwer	G	34	0	0	0	2
Bench	-	-	-	-	-	8
Total			121	214	335	475

== Goaltending statistics ==
Name	Games	Minutes	Wins	Losses	Ties	Goals against	Saves	Shut outs	SV %	GAA
Evan Debrouwer	34	1901	19	11	3	80	908	4	.919	2.52
Max Prawdzik	9	264	3	0	0	15	110	0	.880	3.41
Justin Robbins	1	15	0	0	0	1	12	0	.923	4.00
Empty Net	-	7	-	-	-	1	-	-	-	-
Total	36	2188	22	11	3	97	1030	4	.914	2.66

== Rankings ==
Poll	Week																							
Poll	Pre	1	2	3	4	5	6	7	8	9	10	11	12	13	14	15	16	17	18	19	20	21	22	23 (Final)
USCHO.com	20	NR	NR	NR	NR	NR	NR	NR	NR	20	16	16	17	15	14	13	12	11	10	14	13	13	13	13
USA Today	NR	NR	NR	NR	NR	NR	NR	NR	NR	NR	15	14	NR	NR	14	13	12	9	10	13	13	13	13	13
