= 2023–24 Arizona State Sun Devils men's ice hockey season =

Adirondack Winter Invitational, Champion Desert Hockey Classic, Champion
- Conference: Independent
- Home ice: Mullett Arena

Rankings
- USCHO: NR
- USA Hockey: NR

Record
- Overall: 24–8–6
- Home: 18–5–3
- Road: 5–3–2
- Neutral: 1–0–1

Coaches and captains
- Head coach: Greg Powers
- Assistant coaches: Alex Hicks; Albie O'Connell; Dana Borges
- Captain: Tyler Gratton
- Alternate captains: Matthew Kopperud; Ryan O'Reilly; Lukas Sillinger

The 2023–24 Arizona State Sun Devils men's ice hockey season was the 9th season of play for the program at the Division I level. The Sun Devils represented Arizona State University and were coached by Greg Powers in his 12th season.

== Season ==
Arizona State came into its final season as an independent program looking for one final hurrah before it joined the National Collegiate Hockey Conference. The Sun Devils got off on the right foot by winning their first four games of the season and rising up into the national rankings. The team suffered a bit of a setback when they couldn't overcome Miami and then escaped utter disaster when they needed overtime to defeat Stonehill, the worst team in the nation.

The team recovered with a pair of split series against top-10 teams in November and looked to be well-positioned for a potential NCAA tournament berth. The defense was holding up well enough and the Sun Devils were getting decent goaltending performances from T. J. Semptimphelter. The offense, however, was the star of the show; Lukas Sillinger led the way up front, setting a new program record with 48 points while Matthew Kopperud was lights-out on the power play, scoring 17 of his 23 goals on the man-advantage (the 4th-most in NCAA history).

After a decent stretch in December, Arizona State kicked off the second half of its season by winning a pair of in-season tournaments. First up was the inaugural Adirondack Winter Invitational that finished with a shootout win over #17 Cornell. The following week, at its own Desert Hockey Classic, the Sun Devils took down Omaha in overtime to win the tournament for the first time. The wins lifted ASU up to #11 in the polls but the team was lagging behind in the PairWise. While their record was enviable at 16–3–5, the team's ranking was downgraded for two reasons: strength of schedule and margin of victory. Arizona State had played several ranked teams by the mid-way point of the season, however, those games were off-set by several series against bottom-dwelling clubs. To make matters worse, ASU's narrow wins over Stonehill and the loss to Miami kept the team from rising any higher than 16th in the PairWise.

Due to the way conference schedules typically work out, ASU would have little opportunity in the later portion of the season to climb higher in the rankings and they needed a strong performance against Cornell to stake their claim. Unfortunately, the Sun Devils had one of their worst offensive performances of the season and were limited to just 37 shots over the weekend. The Big Red avenged their Winter Invitational loss with a sweep of Arizona State and pushed the Sun Devils outside the playoff picture. To have any real chance of making the tournament, ASU needed to go undefeated down the stretch. However, the team lost its third consecutive game when Augustana arrived and their dwindling hopes faded even further. The loss also caused a change in ASU's goal crease; Semptimphelter had been playing well for most of the season but he would have poor outing from time to time. The Augustana match saw him surrender 3 goals on 6 shots and, to make matters worse, it took the Vikings more than half the game to reach that total. Gibson Homer was inserted into the cage and, while he was unable to secure a victory, he became the starter for the latter portion of the year.

At the close of the season, Arizona State had set new programs records for wins and winning percentage. They had defeated four teams that finished the year with a national ranking and had one of the top offenses in the country. Unfortunately, their habit of playing down to the opponents level doomed the team's chances at a playoff appearance.

== Departures ==
Player	Position	Nationality	Cause
Blake Dangos	Defenseman	United States	Transferred to Sacred Heart
Josh Doan	Forward	United States	Signed professional contract (Arizona Coyotes)
Chris Grando	Forward	United States	Graduation (signed with Jacksonville Icemen)
Tanner Hickey	Defenseman	Canada	Graduation (retired)
Jack Jensen	Forward	United States	Left program (retired)
Jack Judson	Defenseman	Canada	Graduate transfer to Clarkson
Demetrios Koumontzis	Forward	United States	Graduation (signed with Idaho Steelheads)
Ben Kraws	Goaltender	United States	Graduate transfer to St. Lawrence
Teddy Lagerback	Forward	United States	Transferred to Miami
Robert Mastrosimone	Forward	United States	Graduation (signed with Toronto Marlies)
Ryan Robinson	Forward	United States	Joined club team
Jacob Semik	Defenseman	United States	Graduation (signed with Utah Grizzlies)
Brendan Studioso	Forward	United States	Left program (retired)

== Recruiting ==
Player	Position	Nationality	Age	Notes
Tony Achille	Forward	United States	21	Hingham, MA
Cade Alami	Defenseman	United States	22	Bedford, NY; transfer from Boston College
Brian Chambers	Forward	United States	25	Weymouth, MA; graduate transfer from Massachusetts Lowell
Anthony Dowd	Defenseman	United States	20	Point Pleasant Beach, NJ
Cole Gordon	Forward	United States	20	Windsor, CO
Tyler Gratton	Forward	United States	24	Pottstown, PA; graduate transfer from Penn State
Cole Helm	Forward	United States	20	Dallas, TX
David Hymovitch	Forward	United States	20	Phoenix, AZ
Hank Levy	Goaltender	United States	21	Salt Lake City, UT
Joshua Niedermayer	Defenseman	United States	19	Newport Beach, CA
Matthew Romer	Forward	United States	21	Chicago, IL
Kyle Smolen	Forward	United States	21	Crystal Lake, IL
Brandon Tabakin	Defenseman	United States	23	Woodbury, NY; graduate transfer from Yale
Alex Young	Forward	Canada	22	Calgary, AB; transfer from Colgate; selected 196th overall in 2020

== Roster ==
As of July 1, 2023.

No.	Nat.	Player	Class	Pos	Height	Weight	DoB	Hometown	Previous team	NHL rights
1	(United States)	Hank Levy	Freshman	G	5' 11" (1.8 m)	180 lb (82 kg)	2002-03-11	Salt Lake City, Utah	Penticton (BCHL)	—
2	(United States)	Brandon Tabakin	Graduate	D	5' 10" (1.78 m)	170 lb (77 kg)	2000-05-21	Woodbury, New York	Yale (ECAC)	—
5	(United States)	Ty Murchison	Junior	D	6' 2" (1.88 m)	195 lb (88 kg)	2003-02-02	Corona, California	NTDP (USHL)	PHI, 158th overall 2021
9	(United States)	Anthony Dowd	Freshman	D	5' 6" (1.68 m)	154 lb (70 kg)	2003-04-25	Point Pleasant Beach, New Jersey	Chicago (USHL)	—
10	(United States)	Tucker Ness	Sophomore	D	6' 3" (1.91 m)	219 lb (99 kg)	2002-11-25	Plymouth, Minnesota	Waterloo (USHL)	—
11	(United States)	Benji Eckerle	Senior	F	5' 10" (1.78 m)	180 lb (82 kg)	1999-09-24	Northville, Michigan	Tri-City (USHL)	—
13	(United States)	Cade Alami	Junior	F	6' 7" (2.01 m)	212 lb (96 kg)	2001-03-13	Bedford, New York	Boston College (HEA)	—
14	(Canada)	Ty Jackson	Senior	F	5' 8" (1.73 m)	160 lb (73 kg)	2001-09-06	Oakville, Ontario	Northeastern (HEA)	—
15	(Canada)	Dylan Jackson	Senior	F	5' 10" (1.78 m)	170 lb (77 kg)	2001-09-06	Oakville, Ontario	Northeastern (HEA)	—
16	(United States)	Ethan Szmagaj	Junior	D	6' 0" (1.83 m)	195 lb (88 kg)	2001-09-18	Canton, Michigan	Waterloo (USHL)	—
17	(United States)	Matthew Romer	Freshman	F	5' 9" (1.75 m)	178 lb (81 kg)	2002-09-01	Chicago, Illinois	Omaha (USHL)	—
18	(United States)	David Hymovitch	Freshman	F	5' 11" (1.8 m)	181 lb (82 kg)	2003-08-14	Phoenix, Arizona	Muskegon (USHL)	—
20	(United States)	Jackson Niedermayer	Sophomore	F	6' 0" (1.83 m)	196 lb (89 kg)	2001-03-11	Newport Beach, California	Penticton (BCHL)	—
21	(Canada)	Alex Young	Senior	F	5' 11" (1.8 m)	184 lb (83 kg)	2001-03-22	Calgary, Alberta	Colgate (ECAC)	SJS, 196th overall 2020
24	(United States)	Josh Niedermayer	Freshman	D	6' 0" (1.83 m)	200 lb (91 kg)	2004-02-20	Newport Beach, California	Penticton (BCHL)	—
25	(United States)	Kyle Smolen	Freshman	F	5' 11" (1.8 m)	171 lb (78 kg)	2002-06-18	Crystal Lake, Illinois	Fargo (USHL)	—
26	(United States)	Brian Chambers	Graduate	F	6' 1" (1.85 m)	193 lb (88 kg)	1998-07-24	Weymouth, Massachusetts	UMass Lowell (HEA)	—
27	(United States)	Tim Lovell	Junior	D	5' 10" (1.78 m)	161 lb (73 kg)	2002-02-08	Hingham, Massachusetts	Boston College (HEA)	—
28	(United States)	Matthew Kopperud (A)	Senior	F	6' 1" (1.85 m)	194 lb (88 kg)	1999-08-04	Denver, Colorado	Dubuque (USHL)	—
29	(United States)	Cole Gordon	Freshman	F	6' 2" (1.88 m)	205 lb (93 kg)	2002-12-09	Windsor, Colorado	Minnesota (NAHL)	—
31	(United States)	Gibson Homer	Freshman	G	6' 5" (1.96 m)	209 lb (95 kg)	2003-12-29	Grand Rapids, Michigan	Chicago (USHL)	—
35	(United States)	T. J. Semptimphelter	Sophomore	G	6' 1" (1.85 m)	190 lb (86 kg)	2002-05-09	Marlton, New Jersey	Northeastern (HEA)	—
39	(United States)	Ryan O'Reilly (A)	Senior	F	6' 3" (1.91 m)	220 lb (100 kg)	2000-03-21	Southlake, Texas	Green Bay (USHL)	DET, 98th overall 2018
43	(United States)	Cole Helm	Freshman	F	5' 10" (1.78 m)	195 lb (88 kg)	2003-07-17	Dallas, Texas	Dubuque (BCHL)	—
53	(Canada)	Ryan Alexander	Freshman	F	5' 10" (1.78 m)	178 lb (81 kg)	2002-06-17	Toronto, Ontario	Fargo (USHL)	—
59	(United States)	Tyler Gratton (C)	Graduate	F	6' 2" (1.88 m)	187 lb (85 kg)	1999-08-06	Pottstown, Pennsylvania	Penn State (Big Ten)	—
61	(Canada)	Lukas Sillinger (A)	Junior	F	5' 10" (1.78 m)	170 lb (77 kg)	2000-09-14	Regina, Saskatchewan	Bemidji State (CCHA)	—
82	(United States)	Charlie Schoen	Freshman	F	5' 10" (1.78 m)	160 lb (73 kg)	2001-06-02	Andover, Minnesota	Sioux City (USHL)	—
89	(United States)	Tony Achille	Freshman	F	5' 11" (1.8 m)	173 lb (78 kg)	2002-01-08	Hingham, Massachusetts	Maine (NAHL)	—

== Standings ==
2023–24 NCAA Division I Independent ice hockey standings
	Overall record					
	GP	W	L	T	GF	GA
Alaska	34	17	14	3	110	86
Alaska Anchorage	34	15	17	2	95	105
Arizona State	38	24	8	6	129	94
Lindenwood	28	6	18	4	74	121
Long Island	37	16	20	1	115	103
Stonehill	36	2	34	0	62	213
Rankings: USCHO.com Top 20 Poll

== Schedule and results ==
Date	Time	Opponent^{#}	Rank^{#}	Site	TV	Decision	Result	Attendance	Record
Exhibition
October 6	7:00 pm	Arizona*		Mullett Arena • Tempe, Arizona (Exhibition)		Semptimphelter	W 16–0		
Regular Season
October 13	7:00 pm	#15 Merrimack*		Mullett Arena • Tempe, Arizona		Semptimphelter	W 1–0 ^{OT}	4,680	1–0–0
October 14	5:00 pm	#15 Merrimack*		Mullett Arena • Tempe, Arizona		Semptimphelter	W 4–2	4,569	2–0–0
October 20	7:00 pm	Northern Michigan*	#18	Mullett Arena • Tempe, Arizona		Semptimphelter	W 3–2	4,495	3–0–0
October 21	7:00 pm	Northern Michigan*	#18	Mullett Arena • Tempe, Arizona		Semptimphelter	W 5–1	4,357	4–0–0
October 27	5:05 pm	at Miami*	#13	Steve Cady Arena • Oxford, Ohio		Semptimphelter	L 4–5 ^{OT}	1,818	4–1–0
October 28	5:05 pm	at Miami*	#13	Steve Cady Arena • Oxford, Ohio		Homer	T 1–1 ^{OT}	1,908	4–1–1
November 3	7:00 pm	Stonehill*	#16	Mullett Arena • Tempe, Arizona		Homer	W 5–4 ^{OT}	4,444	5–1–1
November 4	7:00 pm	Stonehill*	#16	Mullett Arena • Tempe, Arizona		Homer	W 3–2	4,487	6–1–1
November 10	7:00 pm	#2 Denver*	#16	Mullett Arena • Tempe, Arizona		Semptimphelter	W 6–5 ^{OT}	5,102	7–1–1
November 11	5:00 pm	#2 Denver*	#16	Mullett Arena • Tempe, Arizona		Semptimphelter	L 4–8	4,996	7–2–1
November 17	7:00 pm	Alaska Anchorage*	#14	Mullett Arena • Tempe, Arizona		Semptimphelter	W 4–3	4,774	8–2–1
November 19	1:00 pm	Alaska Anchorage*	#14	Mullett Arena • Tempe, Arizona		Semptimphelter	W 3–0	4,632	9–2–1
November 24	7:00 pm	#9 Providence*	#13	Mullett Arena • Tempe, Arizona		Semptimphelter	W 4–3 ^{OT}	4,990	10–2–1
November 26	1:00 pm	#9 Providence*	#13	Mullett Arena • Tempe, Arizona		Semptimphelter	L 1–2	4,626	10–3–1
December 1	7:00 pm	at Colorado College*	#12	Ed Robson Arena • Colorado Springs, Colorado	SOCO CW	Semptimphelter	T 2–2 ^{OT}	3,519	10–3–2
December 2	6:00 pm	at Colorado College*	#12	Ed Robson Arena • Colorado Springs, Colorado		Semptimphelter	W 2–0	3,463	11–3–2
December 8	7:00 pm	Dartmouth*	#12	Mullett Arena • Tempe, Arizona		Semptimphelter	T 4–4 ^{OT}	4,781	11–3–3
December 9	5:00 pm	Dartmouth*	#12	Mullett Arena • Tempe, Arizona		Homer	T 1–1 ^{OT}	4,837	11–3–4
December 16	5:00 pm	at Robert Morris*	#13	Clearview Arena • Neville Township, Pennsylvania	FloHockey	Semptimphelter	W 4–1	863	12–3–4
December 17	3:00 pm	at Robert Morris*	#13	Clearview Arena • Neville Township, Pennsylvania	FloHockey, SNP	Semptimphelter	W 8–3	732	13–3–4
Adirondack Winter Invitational
December 29	5:30 pm	vs. Clarkson*	#13	Herb Brooks Arena • Lake Placid, New York (Winter Invitational Semifinal)	ESPN+	Semptimphelter	W 5–2	4,170	14–3–4
December 30	5:30 pm	vs. #17 Cornell*	#13	Herb Brooks Arena • Lake Placid, New York (Winter Invitational)	ESPN+	Semptimphelter	T 2–2 ^{SOW}	3,846	14–3–5
Desert Hockey Classic
January 5	7:00 pm	Harvard*	#12	Mullett Arena • Tempe, Arizona (Desert Hockey Semifinal)		Semptimphelter	W 5–2	5,007	15–3–5
January 6	7:00 pm	Omaha*	#12	Mullett Arena • Tempe, Arizona (Desert Hockey Championship)		Semptimphelter	W 2–1 ^{OT}	4,912	16–3–5
January 12	7:00 pm	#18 Cornell*	#11	Mullett Arena • Tempe, Arizona		Semptimphelter	L 2–3 ^{OT}	5,007	16–4–5
January 13	5:00 pm	#18 Cornell*	#11	Mullett Arena • Tempe, Arizona		Semptimphelter	L 1–4	5,124	16–5–5
January 19	7:00 pm	Augustana*	#16	Mullett Arena • Tempe, Arizona		Homer	L 4–5	4,836	16–6–5
January 20	7:00 pm	Augustana*	#16	Mullett Arena • Tempe, Arizona		Homer	W 3–2	4,892	17–6–5
February 2	7:00 pm	Lindenwood*	#17	Mullett Arena • Tempe, Arizona		Semptimphelter	T 4–4 ^{OT}	4,829	17–6–6
February 3	5:00 pm	Lindenwood*	#17	Mullett Arena • Tempe, Arizona		Homer	W 5–1	4,789	18–6–6
February 9	7:00 pm	Alaska*	#18	Mullett Arena • Tempe, Arizona		Homer	W 2–0	4,769	19–6–6
February 10	5:00 pm	Alaska*	#18	Mullett Arena • Tempe, Arizona		Homer	W 4–2	4,843	20–6–6
February 23	9:07 pm	at Alaska*	#18	Carlson Center • Fairbanks, Alaska		Homer	L 1–3	2,209	20–7–6
February 24	9:07 pm	at Alaska*	#18	Carlson Center • Fairbanks, Alaska		Homer	W 4–3 ^{OT}	3,984	21–7–6
March 1	7:00 pm	Long Island*	#20	Mullett Arena • Tempe, Arizona		Homer	W 4–2	4,951	22–7–6
March 2	5:00 pm	Long Island*	#20	Mullett Arena • Tempe, Arizona		Semptimphelter	W 4–3	4,774	23–7–6
March 8	9:07 pm	at Alaska Anchorage*	#20	Seawolf Sports Complex • Anchorage, Alaska		Homer	L 3–4	870	23–8–6
March 9	7:07 pm	at Alaska Anchorage*	#20	Seawolf Sports Complex • Anchorage, Alaska		Semptimphelter	W 5–2	909	24–8–6
*Non-conference game. ^{#}Rankings from USCHO.com Poll. All times are in Mountain Time. Source:

== Scoring statistics ==
Name	Position	Games	Goals	Assists	Points	PIM
Lukas Sillinger	C/W	38	11	37	48	10
Tim Lovell	D	36	5	32	37	48
Matthew Kopperud	F	38	23	13	36	45
Charlie Schoen	RW	33	8	16	24	31
Benji Eckerle	F	35	5	15	20	12
Brian Chambers	RW	38	4	16	20	35
Ty Jackson	C	21	6	12	18	14
Tyler Gratton	RW	36	12	6	18	18
Kyle Smolen	F	36	7	9	16	59
Ryan O'Reilly	C/W	37	9	6	15	18
Anthony Dowd	C	36	3	10	13	12
Jackson Niedermayer	LW	33	9	4	13	10
Dylan Jackson	RW	15	7	4	11	18
Ryan Alexander	C	27	3	7	10	10
Brandon Tabakin	D	36	2	8	10	13
Alex Young	C/W	37	6	3	9	8
Ethan Szmagaj	D	37	3	4	7	29
Ty Murchison	D	37	3	4	7	62
Josh Niedermayer	D	19	0	4	4	2
Cole Gordon	F	30	3	0	3	23
Tony Achille	F	12	0	3	3	7
Tucker Ness	D	18	0	2	2	60
Cade Alami	D	14	0	2	2	16
Cole Helm	F	6	0	1	1	17
Matthew Romer	F	7	0	1	1	0
T. J. Semptimphelter	G	26	0	1	1	2
Gibson Homer	G	14	0	0	0	0
Chase Hamm	G	1	0	0	0	0
David Hymovitch	F	2	0	0	0	0
Bench	-	-	-	-	-	4
Total			129	220	349	583

== Goaltending statistics ==
Name	Games	Minutes	Wins	Losses	Ties	Goals against	Saves	Shut outs	SV %	GAA
Chase Hamm	1	1:37	0	0	0	0	1	0	1.000	0.00
Gibson Homer	14	795:38	8	3	2	27	362	1	.931	2.04
T. J. Semptimphelter	26	1522:55	16	5	4	64	633	3	.908	2.52
Empty Net	-	9:01	-	-	-	3	-	-	-	-
Total	38	2329:11	24	8	6	94	996	4	.914	2.42

== Rankings ==
Poll	Week																										
Poll	Pre	1	2	3	4	5	6	7	8	9	10	11	12	13	14	15	16	17	18	19	20	21	22	23	24	25	26 (Final)
USCHO.com	NR	NR	18	13	16	16	14	13	12	12	13	-	12	11	16	18	17	18	17	18	20	20	20т	NR	NR	-	NR
USA Hockey	NR	NR	19	16	19	17	14	13	13	12	14	13	-	12	16	18	18	18	17	18	19	19	NR	NR	NR	NR	NR

Note: USCHO did not release a poll in weeks 11 and 25.
Note: USA Hockey did not release a poll in week 12.
