= 2021–22 Arizona State Sun Devils men's ice hockey season =

- Conference: Independent
- Home ice: Oceanside Ice Arena; Gila River Arena

Rankings
- USCHO: NR
- USA Today: NR

Record
- Overall: 17–17–1
- Home: 12–6–0
- Road: 5–11–1

Coaches and captains
- Head coach: Greg Powers
- Assistant coaches: Mike Field; Alex Hicks; Eddie Läck
- Captain(s): Johnny Walker; Jacob Wilson
- Alternate captain(s): William Knierim; Jordan Sandhu

The 2021–22 Arizona State Sun Devils men's ice hockey season was the 7th season of play for the program at the Division I level. The Sun Devils represented Arizona State University and were coached by Greg Powers, in his 10th season.

== Season ==
Arizona State spent their entire season hovering around the .500 mark. The team alternated short winning and losing streaks and were only one more than 3 away from an even record. Despite this consistent mediocrity, ASU had put themselves, partly due to the difficulty of their schedule, into a potential NCAA tournament appearance by mid-January.

The Sun Devils' offense led the way with three players averaging more than a point per game. Freshman Josh Doan, son of famed Arizona Coyotes captain Shane Doan, teamed with sophomore Matthew Kopperud and graduate transfer Colin Theisen to form one of the top offensive lines in the country. Unfortunately, the team's defense wasn't nearly as strong; Arizona State was one of the worst teams in the nation in terms of goals allowed and it was all the offense could do on some nights to keep them in games.

When the Sun Devils met Minnesota State in late-January, Arizona State had a narrow path to a tournament bid if they could earn a split with the #1 team. ASU scored 5 goals in the two games, which was more than most could claim, but they couldn't stop the Mavericks' offense and lost both contests. Their very slim chances were ended the following week when Alaska came to town and swept the weekend slate. Arizona State managed to get their record back up to even by the end of the season but it was apparent that, moving forward, their defensive game needed improvement.

== Departures ==
Player	Position	Nationality	Cause
Filips Buncis	Forward	Latvia	Graduation (Signed with Krefeld Pinguine)
Evan Debrouwer	Goaltender	Canada	Transferred to Bentley
Dom Garcia	Forward	United States	Graduation (retired)
Jarrod Gourley	Defenseman	Canada	Transferred to Connecticut
Gvido Jansons	Defenseman	Latvia	Graduation (Signed with Strömsbro IF)
P. J. Marrocco	Forward	Canada	Transferred to Long Island
Jax Murray	Forward	United States	Transferred to Trinity
Justin Robbins	Goaltender	United States	Transferred to Sacred Heart
James Sanchez	Forward	United States	Graduation (Signed with Hartford Wolf Pack)
Connor Stuart	Forward/Defenseman	United States	Left program (retired)
Peter Zhong	Forward	China	Signed professional contract (HC Kunlun Red Star)

== Recruiting ==
Player	Position	Nationality	Age	Notes
Jack Becker	Forward	United States	24	Dellwood, MN; graduate transfer from Michigan; selected 195th overall in 2015
Josh Doan	Forward	United States	19	Scottsdale, AZ; selected 37th overall in 2021
Jack Jensen	Forward	United States	21	Eden Prairie, MN
Ben Kraws	Goaltender	United States	21	Cranbury, NJ; transfer from Miami
Timothy Lovell	Defenseman	United States	19	Bad Nauheim, GER; transfer from Boston College
Ty Murchison	Defenseman	United States	18	Corona, CA; selected 158th overall in 2021
Jackson Niedermayer	Forward	United States	20	Newport Beach, CA
Ethan Szmagaj	Defenseman	United States	20	Canton, MI
Colin Theisen	Forward	United States	24	Monroe, MI; graduate transfer from Notre Dame
Tim Theocharidis	Defenseman	Canada	23	Toronto, ON; transfer from Bowling Green

== Roster ==
As of August 30, 2021.

No.	Nat.	Player	Class	Pos	Height	Weight	DoB	Hometown	Previous team	NHL rights
1	(United States)	Bronson Moore	Senior	G	5' 11" (1.8 m)	161 lb (73 kg)	1997-11-004	Tri-Cities, Washington	Minnesota (USPHL)	—
4	(United States)	Jacob Wilson (C)	Graduate	D	5' 11" (1.8 m)	185 lb (84 kg)	1997-02-27	Ballwin, Missouri	Sioux City (USHL)	—
5	(United States)	Ty Murchison	Freshman	D	6' 2" (1.88 m)	190 lb (86 kg)	2003-02-02	Corona, California	USNTDP (USHL)	PHI, 158th overall 2021
7	(United States)	Johnny Walker (C)	Graduate	F	6' 1" (1.85 m)	185 lb (84 kg)	1996-08-21	Phoenix, Arizona	Chicago (USHL)	—
8	(Canada)	Tanner Hickey	Junior	D	5' 10" (1.78 m)	170 lb (77 kg)	1999-04-30	Leduc, Alberta	Alabama Huntsville (WCHA)	—
9	(United States)	Sean Dhooghe	Graduate	F	5' 3" (1.6 m)	150 lb (68 kg)	1999-03-09	Aurora, Illinois	Wisconsin (Big Ten)	—
10	(United States)	Michael Mancinelli	Sophomore	F	5' 9" (1.75 m)	185 lb (84 kg)	2001-06-28	Northville, Michigan	Des Moines (USHL)	—
11	(United States)	Benji Eckerle	Sophomore	F	5' 9" (1.75 m)	175 lb (79 kg)	1999-09-24	Northville, Michigan	Tri-City (USHL)	—
13	(United States)	Chris Grando	Senior (RS)	F	5' 10" (1.78 m)	171 lb (78 kg)	1998-08-22	Islip, New York	Boston College (HEA)	—
15	(United States)	Carson Kosobud	Sophomore	D	6' 0" (1.83 m)	190 lb (86 kg)	1999-06-04	Moorhead, Minnesota	Penticton (BCHL)	—
16	(United States)	Ethan Szmagaj	Freshman	D	6' 0" (1.83 m)	194 lb (88 kg)	2001-09-18	Canton, Michigan	Waterloo (USHL)	—
17	(United States)	Jacob Semik	Junior	D	6' 0" (1.83 m)	180 lb (82 kg)	2000-03-10	Canton, Michigan	Dubuque (USHL)	—
18	(United States)	Jack Jensen	Freshman	F	6' 2" (1.88 m)	205 lb (93 kg)	2000-08-31	Eden Prairie, Minnesota	Omaha (USHL)	—
19	(Canada)	Jordan Sandhu (A)	Senior	F	5' 7" (1.7 m)	155 lb (70 kg)	1999-05-13	Richmond, British Columbia	Vernon (BCHL)	—
20	(United States)	Jackson Niedermayer	Freshman	F	6' 0" (1.83 m)	200 lb (91 kg)	2001-03-11	Newport Beach, California	Penticton (BCHL)	—
22	(Canada)	Jack Judson	Junior	D	6' 0" (1.83 m)	180 lb (82 kg)	2000-02-26	White Rock, British Columbia	Vernon (BCHL)	—
23	(United States)	Demetrios Koumontzis	Senior	F	5' 10" (1.78 m)	183 lb (83 kg)	2000-03-24	Scottsdale, Arizona	Edina (USHS–MN)	CGY, 108th overall 2018
27	(United States)	Tim Lovell	Sophomore	D	5' 8" (1.73 m)	150 lb (68 kg)	2002-02-08	Hingham, Massachusetts	Boston College (HEA)	—
28	(United States)	Matthew Kopperud	Sophomore	F	5' 11" (1.8 m)	170 lb (77 kg)	1999-08-04	Denver, Colorado	Dubuque (USHL)	—
29	(United States)	William Knierim (A)	Graduate	F	6' 4" (1.93 m)	225 lb (102 kg)	1998-01-22	Skokie, Illinois	Dubuque (USHL)	—
33	(United States)	Ben Kraws	Junior	G	6' 4" (1.93 m)	175 lb (79 kg)	2000-08-02	Cranbury, New Jersey	Miami (NCHC)	—
34	(Canada)	Cole Brady	Sophomore	G	6' 5" (1.96 m)	180 lb (82 kg)	2001-02-12	Pickering, Ontario	Fargo (USHL)	NJD, 127th overall 2019
39	(United States)	Ryan O'Reilly	Sophomore	F	6' 3" (1.91 m)	205 lb (93 kg)	2000-03-21	Southlake, Texas	Green Bay (USHL)	DET, 98th overall 2018
44	(Canada)	Tim Theocharidis	Graduate	D	6' 1" (1.85 m)	183 lb (83 kg)	1998-06-28	Toronto, Ontario	Bowling Green (WCHA)	—
63	(United States)	Colin Theisen	Graduate	F	6' 0" (1.83 m)	187 lb (85 kg)	1997-04-24	Monroe, Michigan	Notre Dame (Big Ten)	—
72	(United States)	Jack Becker	Graduate	F	6' 3" (1.91 m)	192 lb (87 kg)	1997-06-24	Dellwood, Minnesota	Michigan (Big Ten)	BOS, 195th overall 2015
94	(United States)	Josh Doan	Freshman	F	6' 2" (1.88 m)	176 lb (80 kg)	2002-02-01	Scottsdale, Arizona	Chicago (USHL)	ARI, 37th overall 2021

== Standings ==
2021–22 NCAA Division I Independent ice hockey standings
	Overall record					
	GP	W	L	T	GF	GA
Alaska	34	14	18	2	87	95
Arizona State	35	17	17	1	116	121
Long Island	34	10	21	3	87	120
Rankings: USCHO.com Top 20 Poll

== Schedule and results ==
Date	Time	Opponent^{#}	Rank^{#}	Site	TV	Decision	Result	Attendance	Record
Regular season
October 2	7:05 PM	Massachusetts Lowell*		Oceanside Ice Arena • Tempe, Arizona	ASU Live Stream	Kraws	W 5–3	790	1–0–0
October 3	4:05 PM	Massachusetts Lowell*		Oceanside Ice Arena • Tempe, Arizona		Kraws	L 2–4	814	1–1–0
October 8	7:07 PM	at #12 Denver*		Magness Arena • Denver, Colorado		Brady	L 3–8	4,554	1–2–0
October 9	6:07 PM	at #12 Denver*		Magness Arena • Denver, Colorado		Brady	L 3–4	5,655	1–3–0
October 15	7:05 PM	New Hampshire*		Oceanside Ice Arena • Tempe, Arizona		Brady	W 5–1	698	2–3–0
October 16	4:05 PM	New Hampshire*		Oceanside Ice Arena • Tempe, Arizona		Brady	W 5–1	915	3–3–0
October 22	5:00 PM	at Colgate*		Class of 1965 Arena • Hamilton, New York		Brady	L 3–8	1,081	3–4–0
October 23	5:00 PM	at Colgate*		Class of 1965 Arena • Hamilton, New York		Kraws	W 4–3	1,394	4–4–0
October 29	7:05 PM	St. Thomas*		Oceanside Ice Arena • Tempe, Arizona		Kraws	W 5–2	0	5–4–0
October 30	7:05 PM	St. Thomas*		Oceanside Ice Arena • Tempe, Arizona		Brady	W 5–2	900	6–4–0
November 12	5:00 PM	at #5 Quinnipiac*		People's United Center • Hamden, Connecticut		Brady	L 3–5	3,050	6–5–0
November 13	5:00 PM	at #5 Quinnipiac*		People's United Center • Hamden, Connecticut		Kraws	L 2–5	2,928	6–6–0
November 24	7:00 PM	#20 Bemidji State*		Oceanside Ice Arena • Tempe, Arizona		Kraws	L 3–4	861	6–7–0
November 26	7:00 PM	#20 Bemidji State*		Oceanside Ice Arena • Tempe, Arizona		Kraws	W 6–4	0	7–7–0
December 3	7:05 PM	#12 Denver*		Oceanside Ice Arena • Tempe, Arizona		Kraws	L 2–6	891	7–8–0
December 4	7:05 PM	#12 Denver*		Oceanside Ice Arena • Tempe, Arizona		Brady	L 1–7	911	7–9–0
December 10	8:05 PM	#18 Clarkson*		Oceanside Ice Arena • Tempe, Arizona		Kraws	W 4–3	905	8–9–0
December 11	8:05 PM	#18 Clarkson*		Oceanside Ice Arena • Tempe, Arizona		Kraws	W 4–1	746	9–9–0
December 17	7:07 PM	at Colorado College*		Ed Robson Arena • Colorado Springs, Colorado	AT&T RM	Kraws	W 5–2	3,528	10–9–0
December 18	6:07 PM	at Colorado College*		Ed Robson Arena • Colorado Springs, Colorado		Kraws	L 2–4	3,531	10–10–0
January 1	7:07 PM	#9 Cornell*		Oceanside Ice Arena • Tempe, Arizona		Brady	W 5–2	0	11–10–0
January 2	7:07 PM	#9 Cornell*		Oceanside Ice Arena • Tempe, Arizona		Brady	W 3–2	900	12–10–0
January 7	5:30 PM	at Boston University*		Agganis Arena • Boston, Massachusetts		Brady	L 1–7	2,539	12–11–0
January 8	5:00 PM	at Boston University*		Agganis Arena • Boston, Massachusetts	NESN+	Kraws	L 2–5	1,991	12–12–0
January 11	5:00 PM	at #11 Northeastern*		Matthews Arena • Boston, Massachusetts		Kraws	W 6–2	0	13–12–0
January 14	5:05 PM	at RIT*		Gene Polisseni Center • Henrietta, New York		Kraws	W 2–1	1,523	14–12–0
January 15	3:05 PM	at RIT*		Gene Polisseni Center • Henrietta, New York		Kraws	W 5–1	2,308	15–12–0
January 28	6:07 PM	at #1 Minnesota State*		Mayo Clinic Health System Event Center • Mankato, Minnesota	CCMk–14	Kraws	L 2–4	4,332	15–13–0
January 29	5:07 PM	at #1 Minnesota State*		Mayo Clinic Health System Event Center • Mankato, Minnesota	CCMk–14	Kraws	L 3–5	4,902	15–14–0
February 4	7:07 PM	Alaska*		Oceanside Ice Arena • Tempe, Arizona		Kraws	L 3–5	903	15–15–0
February 5	7:07 PM	Alaska*		Oceanside Ice Arena • Tempe, Arizona		Kraws	L 3–4	903	15–16–0
February 25	9:07 PM	at Alaska*		Carlson Center • Fairbanks, Alaska		Kraws	L 2–3	1,525	15–17–0
February 26	9:07 PM	at Alaska*		Carlson Center • Fairbanks, Alaska		Kraws	T 1–2 ^{OT}	2,302	15–17–1
March 11	7:05 PM	Long Island*		Oceanside Ice Arena • Tempe, Arizona		Kraws	W 2–1	920	16–17–1
March 12	4:05 PM	Long Island*		Oceanside Ice Arena • Tempe, Arizona		Kraws	W 5–2	920	17–17–1
*Non-conference game. ^{#}Rankings from USCHO.com Poll. All times are in Mountain Time. Source:

== Scoring statistics ==
Name	Position	Games	Goals	Assists	Points	PIM
Colin Theisen	LW	35	19	23	42	8
Matthew Kopperud	F	34	22	18	40	28
Josh Doan	RW	25	12	25	37	54
Jack Becker	C	35	8	16	24	12
Tim Lovell	D	34	4	18	22	28
Tim Theocharidis	D	35	4	11	15	39
Christopher Grando	LW	30	6	8	14	24
Jack Jensen	LW	32	6	8	14	38
Sean Dhooghe	RW	34	4	10	14	28
Johnny Walker	RW	23	6	7	13	18
Michael Mancinelli	C	30	2	10	12	6
Ryan O'Reilly	C/RW	31	6	5	11	4
Demetrios Koumontzis	LW	23	4	7	11	18
Jack Judson	D	31	0	9	9	18
Ty Murchison	D	35	4	3	7	76
Benji Eckerle	F	29	3	4	7	10
Jordan Sandhu	C	26	2	3	5	2
Ethan Szmagaj	D	25	1	4	5	32
Jacob Wilson	D	31	0	4	4	66
Jackson Niedermayer	LW	19	3	0	3	4
William Knierim	RW	15	0	2	2	4
Jacob Semik	D	34	0	1	1	6
Tanner Hickey	D	1	0	0	0	0
Bronson Moore	G	2	0	0	0	0
Cole Brady	G	12	0	0	0	0
Ben Kraws	G	27	0	0	0	0
Bench	-	-	-	-	-	4
Total			116	196	312	527

== Goaltending statistics ==
Name	Games	Minutes	Wins	Losses	Ties	Goals against	Saves	Shut outs	SV %	GAA
Bronson Moore	3	5:47	0	0	0	0	4	0	1.000	0.00
Ben Kraws	27	1434	12	11	1	71	689	0	.907	2.97
Cole Brady	12	647	5	6	0	42	377	0	.900	3.89
Empty Net	-	19	-	-	-	8	-	-	-	-
Total	35	2106	17	17	1	121	1070	0	.898	3.45

== Rankings ==
Poll	Week																									
Poll	Pre	1	2	3	4	5	6	7	8	9	10	11	12	13	14	15	16	17	18	19	20	21	22	23	24	25 (Final)
USCHO.com	NR	NR	NR	NR	NR	NR	NR	NR	NR	NR	NR	NR	NR	NR	NR	NR	NR	NR	NR	NR	NR	NR	NR	NR	-	NR
USA Today	NR	NR	NR	NR	NR	NR	NR	NR	NR	NR	NR	NR	NR	NR	NR	NR	NR	NR	NR	NR	NR	NR	NR	NR	NR	NR

Note: USCHO did not release a poll in week 24.
