= Greg Powers =

American ice hockey player and coach

Biographical details
- Born: December 8, 1976 (age 49); Indianapolis, Indiana, U.S.
- Education: Arizona State University

Playing career
- 1995–1999: Arizona State
- Position: Goaltender

Coaching career (HC unless noted)
- 2008–2010: Arizona State (Assistant)
- 2010–2026: Arizona State

Head coaching record
- Overall: 153–162–26 (.487) [NCAA] 164–27–9 (.843) [ACHA]
- Tournaments: 0–1 (.000)

Accomplishments and honors

Championships
- 2014 WCHL Conference Champion; 2014 ACHA National Champion; 2015 WCHL Conference Champion

Awards
- 2009 Arizona State Athletic Hall of Fame; 2014 WCHL Coach of the Year

Greg Powers (born December 8, 1976) former ice hockey coach who was most recently the head coach of the Arizona State Sun Devils men's ice hockey team

== Career ==
Greg Powers began attending Arizona State in the fall of 1995. He served as the starting goaltender for the Sun Devils club team competing in the American Collegiate Hockey Association for four seasons, earning ACHA All-American honors in 1997, 1998 and 1999 while being named team MVP for both his sophomore and junior seasons. After graduating from the Walter Cronkite School of Journalism and Mass Communication Powers returned to his alma mater in 2008 to serve as an assistant coach. After two seasons he was promoted to the head coaching position and swiftly raised the profile of the Sun Devils. In 2012–13, he led Arizona State to its first 30-win season and the following campaign took home the program's first ACHA national championship. Powers was retained as head coach once Arizona State became an NCAA-sponsored Division I program for the 2015–16 season.

Powers was a finalist for the 2019 & 2020 Spencer Penrose Award, which is awarded to the NCAA Division 1 Coach Of The Year. He was also awarded the 2018–19 Frank Kush Sun Devil Athletics Coach of the Year Award.

During the 2018–2019 hockey season, Powers and his staff led the Sun Devils to become the fastest start-up program to qualify for the NCAA Division 1 Tournament in NCAA History. The Sun Devils finished the season ranked 10th in the Pairwise rankings.

Prior to the 2026 season, Powers brought in Tim Ziesel (a former Green Beret) to oversee a strenuous workout session for the first official team activity on August 20 at Sun Angel Stadium. Near the end of the workout, Matthew Mayich, a prospect for the St. Louis Blues, collapsed and wound up in the hospital in a coma with an "exertional heat stroke". The university announced it was reviewing the circumstances of the workout alongside campus police, with Ziesel retaining a lawyer. Powers was placed on paid administrative leave on September 30, 2026, following an anonymous letter by seven players to Arizona State University president Michael M. Crow detailing the workout and requesting the team's coaching staff be placed on leave.

Powers was replaced as head coach of the Sun Devils by Dave Hakstol on October 15, 2026, after mutually reaching an agreement with the university to part ways. The agreement to terminate Powers' contract with Arizona State University included a payout of 75% of his remaining salary and bonuses he had earned but not received paid out over three years, as well as a requirement that he cooperate in any potential legal proceedings.

== Head coaching record ==
Record table
Season	Team	Overall	Conference	Standing	Postseason
Arizona State Sun Devils (WCHL) (2010–2015)
2010–11	Arizona State				
2011–12	Arizona State				
2012–13	Arizona State	35–8–1			ACHA Final Four
2013–14	Arizona State				ACHA national champion
2014–15	Arizona State	35–4–1			ACHA Final Four
Arizona State:		164–27–9			
Arizona State Sun Devils Independent (2015–2024)
2015–16	Arizona State	5–22–2			
2016–17	Arizona State	10–19–3			
2017–18	Arizona State	8–21–5			
2018–19	Arizona State	21–13–1			NCAA regional semifinals
2019–20	Arizona State	22–11–3			Tournament cancelled
2020–21	Arizona State	7–16–3			
2021–22	Arizona State	17–17–1			
2022–23	Arizona State	18–21–0			
2023–24	Arizona State	24–8–6			
Arizona State:		132–148–24			
Arizona State Sun Devils (NCHC) (2024–2026)
2024–25	Arizona State	21–14–2	14–9–1	2nd	NCHC Semifinals
2025–26	Arizona State	14–21–1	7–16–1	9th	
2026–27	Arizona State	0–0–0	0–0–0	–	(Coached no games, replaced mid-season)
Arizona State:		35–35–3	21-25-2		
Total:		167–183–27			
National champion Postseason invitational champion Conference regular season champion Conference regular season and conference tournament champion Division regular season champion Division regular season and conference tournament champion Conference tournament champion

Sporting positions
Preceded by Position created (NCAA Division I)	Head coach of Arizona State University; 2015–2026	Succeeded by Dave Hakstol
