= Josh Doan =

American ice hockey player (born 2002)

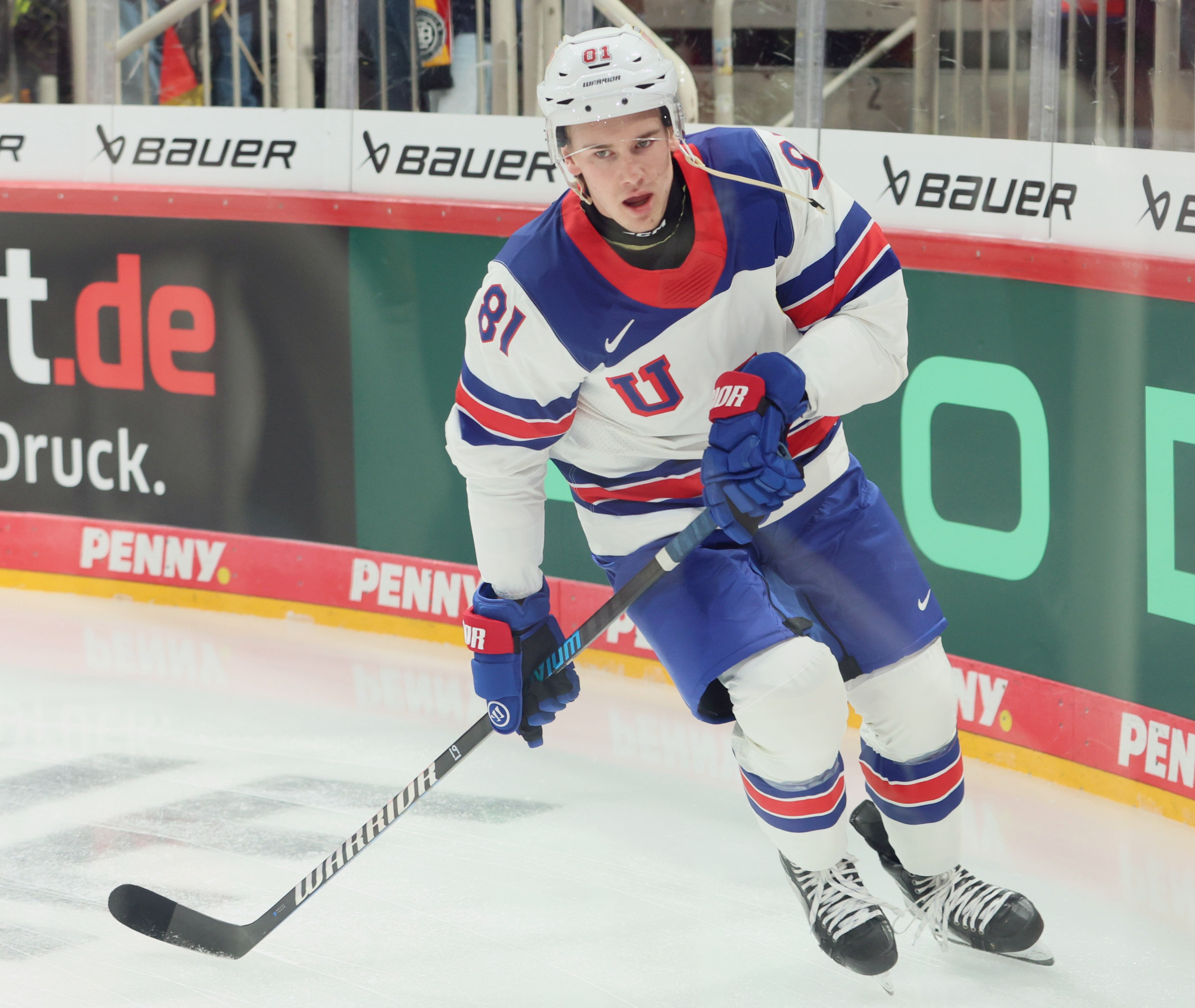
- Doan with the United States in 2025
- Born: February 1, 2002 (age 24) Scottsdale, Arizona, U.S.
- Height: 6 ft 1 in (185 cm)
- Weight: 185 lb (84 kg; 13 st 3 lb)
- Position: Right wing
- Shoots: Right
- NHL team Former teams: Buffalo Sabres; Arizona Coyotes; Utah Hockey Club
- National team: United States
- NHL draft: 37th overall, 2021; Arizona Coyotes
- Playing career: 2023–present

Joshua Thomas Doan (born February 1, 2002) is an American professional ice hockey player who is a right winger for the Buffalo Sabres of the National Hockey League (NHL). The Arizona Coyotes selected Doan with the 37th overall pick in the 2021 NHL entry draft. He is the son of Coyotes franchise scoring leader Shane Doan.

== Playing career ==
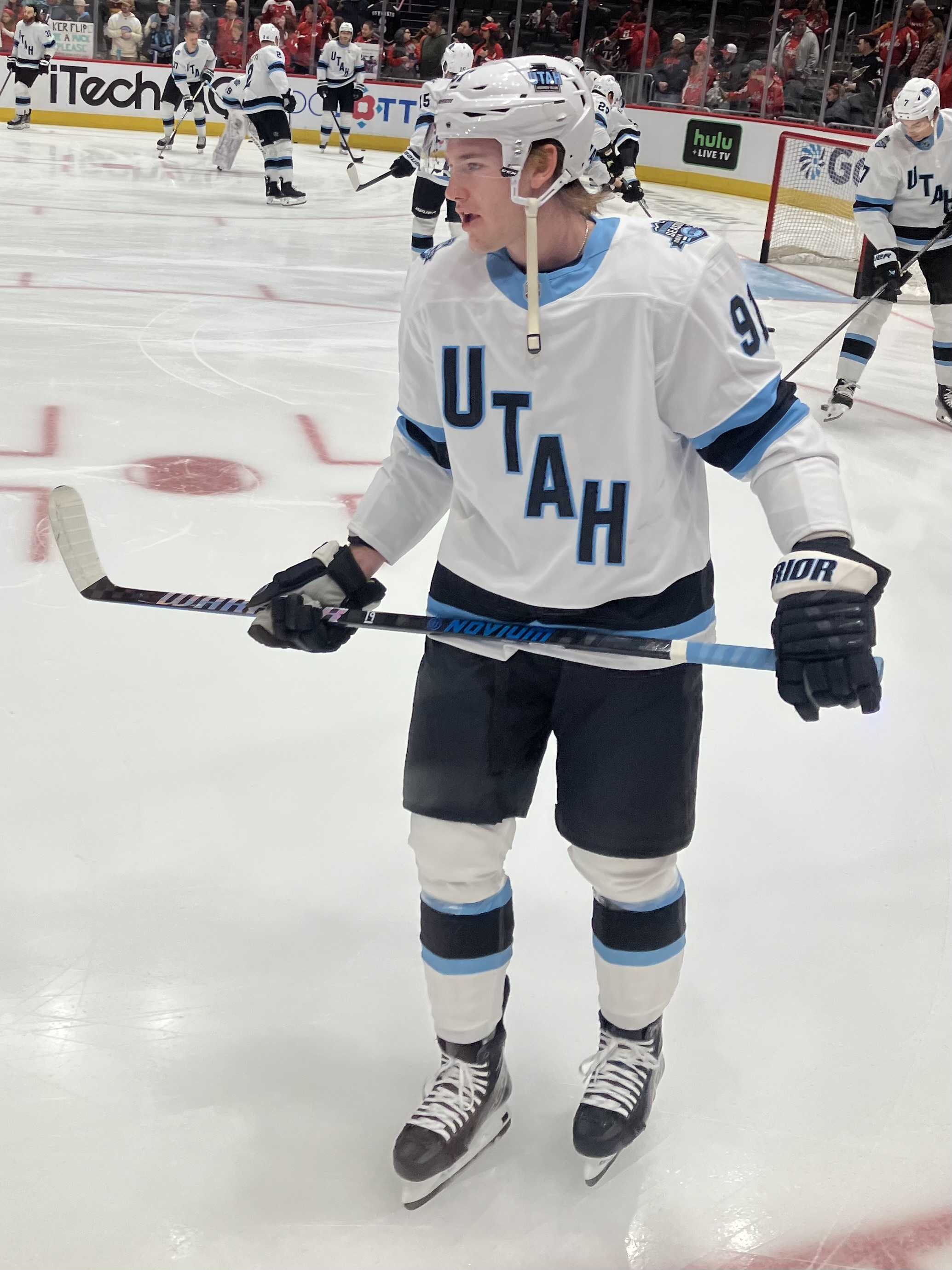
Doan with the Utah Hockey Club in 2025

While growing up in Arizona, Doan played in the Phoenix Jr. Coyotes program. The Chicago Steel of the United States Hockey League (USHL) selected Doan with the 95th overall pick of the 2018 USHL Futures Draft. Doan played one more year with the Jr. Coyotes before joining the Steel for the 2019–20 season. He tied for 16th on the team with 14 points (five goals, nine assists) in 45 games and was passed over by all 31 National Hockey League (NHL) teams in the 2020 NHL entry draft.

On June 21, 2019, Doan announced his commitment to play for Arizona State University. He began his collegiate career at ASU in the 2021–22 season.

In his second year of draft eligibility, Doan returned to the Steel and emerged as one of the scoring leaders on the USHL's Clark Cup championship team. He finished third on both the Steel – behind Sean Farrell and Matthew Coronato – and in the entire league with 70 points (31 goals, 39 assists) in 53 games. The NHL Central Scouting Bureau ranked the 19-year-old Doan as the 87th-best North American skater eligible for the 2021 NHL entry draft.

On July 24, 2021, the Arizona Coyotes selected Doan in the second round with the 37th overall pick in the 2021 NHL entry draft. Doan's father, Shane, played his entire 21-year NHL career for the Coyotes franchise and previously served as the team's chief hockey development officer.

Following completion of his sophomore year as captain of the Sun Devils in the 2022–23 season, Doan concluded his collegiate career by signing a three-year, entry-level contract with the Arizona Coyotes on March 16, 2023. With his contract not due to commence until the 2023–24 season, Doan was signed by the Coyotes' American Hockey League (AHL) affiliate, the Tucson Roadrunners, for the remainder of their season.

Doan began the 2023–24 season with the Roadrunners, leading the team in goals (26) and points (46) before being recalled to the Coyotes on March 25, 2024. The following day, Doan made his NHL debut and scored two goals (including the game-winning goal) in a 6–2 victory against the Columbus Blue Jackets, and became the first player in franchise history to score multiple goals in their debut.

At the completion of the 2024–25 season, Doan was traded by the rebranded Utah Mammoth, along with Michael Kesselring, to the Buffalo Sabres in exchange for JJ Peterka on June 25, 2025.

On January 21, 2026, the Sabres signed Doan to a seven-year, $48.65 million contract extension. At the time of signing, Doan had appeared in 49 games and had career highs in goals (15), assists (20), and points (35) in a season. He scored his first career playoff goal on April 26 during Game 4 of the Sabres' first round series against the Boston Bruins during the 2026 Stanley Cup playoffs.

== International play ==
Medal record

Men's ice hockey

Representing the United States

World Championships
Gold medal – first place	2025 Sweden/Denmark	

Doan represented the United States at the 2025 World Championship where he recorded one goal in nine games and helped the team win their first gold medal since 1933.

== Career statistics ==
=== Regular season and playoffs ===
			Regular season					Playoffs
Season	Team	League	GP	G	A	Pts	PIM	GP	G	A	Pts	PIM
2019–20	Chicago Steel	USHL	45	5	9	14	8	—	—	—	—	—
2020–21	Chicago Steel	USHL	53	31	39	70	45	8	2	3	5	4
2021–22	Arizona State University	NCAA	35	12	25	37	54	—	—	—	—	—
2022–23	Arizona State University	NCAA	39	16	22	38	18	—	—	—	—	—
2022–23	Tucson Roadrunners	AHL	14	3	3	6	0	3	0	1	1	4
2023–24	Tucson Roadrunners	AHL	62	26	20	46	32	2	0	0	0	0
2023–24	Arizona Coyotes	NHL	11	5	4	9	0	—	—	—	—	—
2024–25	Utah Hockey Club	NHL	51	7	12	19	8	—	—	—	—	—
2024–25	Tucson Roadrunners	AHL	28	11	15	26	22	—	—	—	—	—
2025–26	Buffalo Sabres	NHL	82	25	27	52	25	13	3	7	10	8
NHL totals			144	37	43	80	33	13	3	7	10	8

=== International ===
Year	Team	Event	Result	GP	G	A	Pts	PIM
2025	United States	WC	1st place, gold medalist(s)	9	1	0	1	0
Senior totals				9	1	0	1	0

== Awards and honors ==
Award	Year	Ref
USHL
Clark Cup champion	2021	
All-USHL Second Team	2021	
AHL
All-Star Game	2024, 2025	
All-Rookie Team	2024	
