= Brinson Pasichnuk =

Canadian ice hockey player

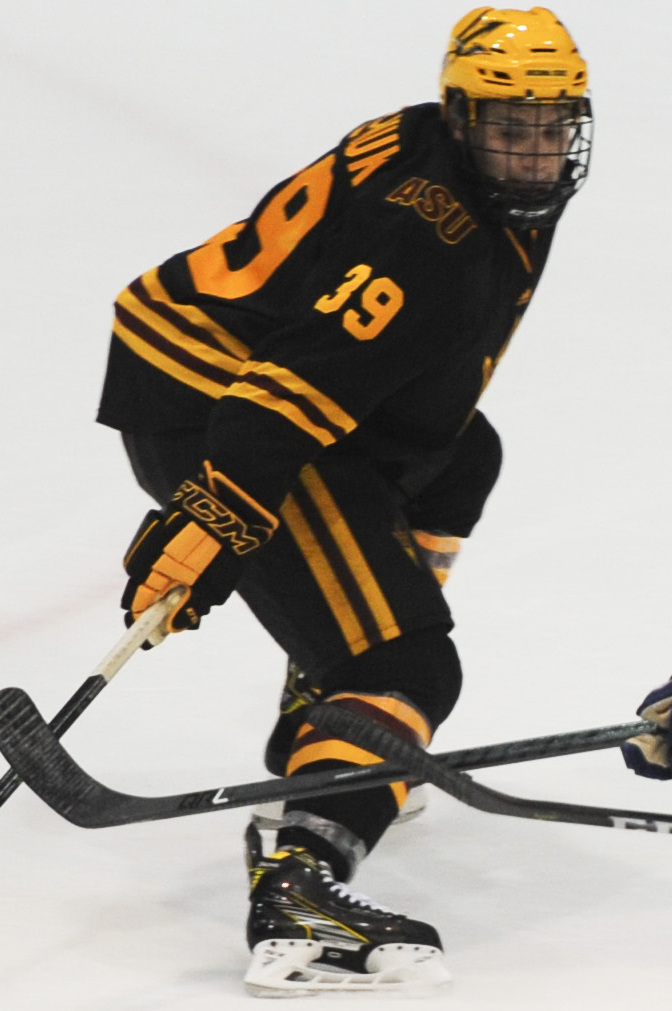
- Pasichnuk with Arizona State in 2017
- Born: November 24, 1997 (age 28) Bonnyville, Alberta, Canada
- Height: 6 ft 0 in (183 cm)
- Weight: 205 lb (93 kg; 14 st 9 lb)
- Position: Defense
- Shoots: Left
- NCHL team Former teams: Bonnyville Pontiacs; San Jose Sharks
- NHL draft: Undrafted
- Playing career: 2021–present

Brinson Pasichnuk (born November 24, 1997) is a Canadian former professional ice hockey player currently playing senior men's hockey with the Bonnyville Senior Pontiacs of the North Central Hockey League (NCHL) in Alberta, Canada. He previously played for the San Jose Sharks of the National Hockey League (NHL).

== Playing career ==
Born in Bonnyville, Alberta, Pasichnuk played with the Bonnyville Pontiacs in the Alberta Junior Hockey League (AJHL) before spending four seasons with the Arizona State Sun Devils. He signed an entry-level contract as a free agent with the Sharks on March 31, 2021.

He made his NHL debut on April 28, 2021, in a 4–2 win over the Arizona Coyotes.

As a free agent following two seasons within the Sharks organization, Pasichnuk paused his professional career in returning to Alberta and playing Senior men's hockey with the Bonnyville Pontiacs of the NCHL for the 2022–23 season.

== Career statistics ==
			Regular season					Playoffs
Season	Team	League	GP	G	A	Pts	PIM	GP	G	A	Pts	PI
2012–13	Lloydminster Bobcats	AMHL	1	0	0	0	0	—	—	—	—	—
2013–14	Lloydminster Bobcats	AMHL	35	6	12	18	20	—	—	—	—	—
2013–14	Bonnyville Pontiacs	AJHL	2	0	1	1	0	—	—	—	—	—
2014–15	Bonnyville Pontiacs	AJHL	56	8	21	29	47	15	1	6	7	35
2015–16	Bonnyville Pontiacs	AJHL	52	20	45	65	161	4	1	2	3	2
2016–17	Arizona State University	NCAA	31	7	7	14	38	—	—	—	—	—
2017–18	Arizona State University	NCAA	34	8	18	26	56	—	—	—	—	—
2018–19	Arizona State University	NCAA	35	13	17	30	28	—	—	—	—	—
2019–20	Arizona State University	NCAA	36	11	26	37	18	—	—	—	—	—
2020–21	San Jose Barracuda	AHL	32	1	7	8	27	4	0	1	1	0
2020–21	San Jose Sharks	NHL	4	0	0	0	2	—	—	—	—	—
2021–22	San Jose Barracuda	AHL	9	1	0	1	4	—	—	—	—	—
2022–23	Bonnyville Senior Pontiacs	NCHL	4	1	0	1	0	—	—	—	—	—
2023–24	Bonnyville Senior Pontiacs	NCHL	6	6	7	13	2	1	0	0	0	19
NHL totals			4	0	0	0	2	—	—	—	—	—
