= Alex Hicks =

Canadian ice hockey player (born 1969)

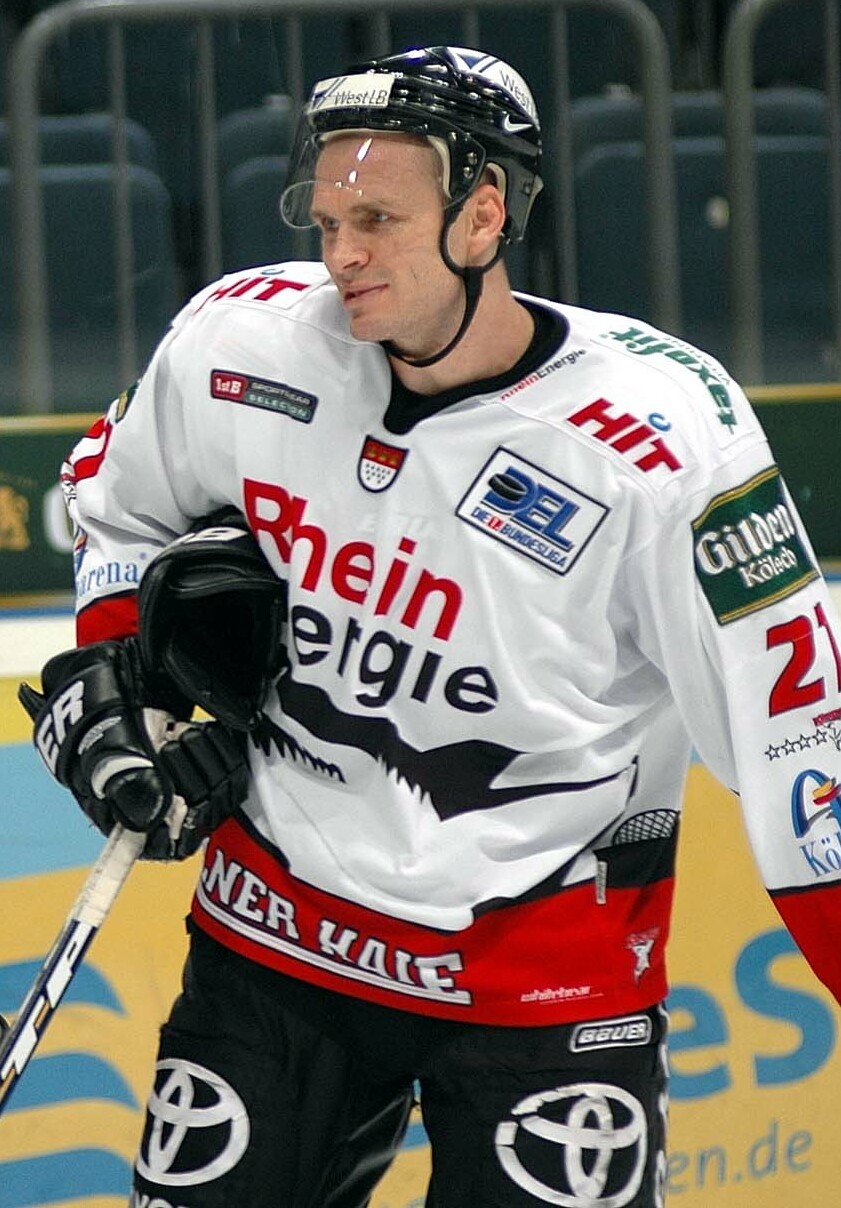
- Hicks in 2006

Biographical details
- Born: September 4, 1969 (age 57); Calgary, Alberta, Canada
- Education: University of Wisconsin–Eau Claire

Playing career
- 1995–1997: Anaheim Ducks
- 1997–1998: Pittsburgh Penguins
- 1998–1999: San Jose Sharks
- 1999–2000: Florida Panthers
- 2000–2001: Eisbären Berlin
- 2001–2006: Kölner Haie
- Position: Left wing

Coaching career (HC unless noted)
- 2017– 2026: Arizona State (assistant)

Alexander W. Hicks (born September 4, 1969) is a Canadian former ice hockey player who played in the National Hockey League (NHL) for the Mighty Ducks of Anaheim, Pittsburgh Penguins, San Jose Sharks and the Florida Panthers. He is the son of Wayne Hicks. He was most recently an assistant coach for the Arizona State Sun Devils men's ice hockey team.

== Playing career ==
Hicks played a total of 258 regular season games, scoring 25 goals and 54 assists for 79 points, collecting 247 penalty minutes. He also played 15 playoff games (11 with the Penguins and 4 with the Panthers) scoring two assists and collecting eight penalty minutes. He spent six seasons playing in the Deutsche Eishockey Liga in Germany, playing one season with Eisbären Berlin and the Kölner Haie for five seasons before retiring. He was on the championship DEL team in 2002 with the Haie.

He was a member of the RHI's Buffalo Stampede championship team in 1994.

== Personal life ==
In 2002, Hicks founded the Alex Hicks Initiative, a non-profit charitable organization that provides, coordinates and distributes gifts and support to ill and underprivileged children in Cologne, Germany. The organization continues to thrive to this day.

== Career statistics ==
=== Regular season and playoffs ===
			Regular season					Playoffs
Season	Team	League	GP	G	A	Pts	PIM	GP	G	A	Pts	PIM
1987–88	Calgary Spurs	AJHL	56	37	58	95	185	—	—	—	—	—
1988–89	University of Wisconsin–Eau Claire	NCAA III	30	21	26	47	42	—	—	—	—	—
1989–90	University of Wisconsin–Eau Claire	NCAA III	34	31	48	79	30	—	—	—	—	—
1990–91	University of Wisconsin–Eau Claire	NCAA III	26	22	35	57	43	—	—	—	—	—
1991–92	University of Wisconsin–Eau Claire	NCAA III	26	24	42	66	61	—	—	—	—	—
1992–93	Adirondack Red Wings	AHL	3	0	0	0	0	—	—	—	—	—
1992–93	Toledo Storm	ECHL	52	26	34	60	100	16	5	10	15	79
1993–94	Adirondack Red Wings	AHL	8	1	3	4	2	5	0	2	2	2
1993–94	Toledo Storm	ECHL	60	31	49	80	240	14	10	10	20	56
1994–95	Las Vegas Thunder	IHL	78	24	42	66	212	9	2	4	6	47
1995–96	Mighty Ducks of Anaheim	NHL	64	10	11	21	37	—	—	—	—	—
1995–96	Baltimore Bandits	AHL	13	2	10	12	23	—	—	—	—	—
1996–97	Mighty Ducks of Anaheim	NHL	18	2	6	8	14	—	—	—	—	—
1996–97	Pittsburgh Penguins	NHL	55	5	15	20	76	5	0	1	1	2
1997–98	Pittsburgh Penguins	NHL	58	7	13	20	54	6	0	0	0	2
1998–99	San Jose Sharks	NHL	4	0	1	1	4	—	—	—	—	—
1998–99	Florida Panthers	NHL	51	0	6	6	58	—	—	—	—	—
1999–00	Florida Panthers	NHL	8	1	2	3	4	4	0	1	1	4
1999–00	Louisville Panthers	AHL	17	6	5	11	23	—	—	—	—	—
2000–01	Eisbären Berlin	DEL	56	27	31	58	189	—	—	—	—	—
2001–02	Kölner Haie	DEL	58	26	26	52	130	13	7	7	14	32
2002–03	Kölner Haie	DEL	46	21	17	38	132	15	7	10	17	20
2003–04	Kölner Haie	DEL	41	14	16	30	122	4	0	0	0	16
2004–05	Kölner Haie	DEL	40	11	19	30	106	6	4	2	6	10
2005–06	Kölner Haie	DEL	26	8	6	14	63	8	5	3	8	55
DEL totals			267	107	115	222	742	46	23	22	45	133
NHL totals			258	25	54	79	247	15	0	2	2	8
