= 2015–16 UConn Huskies men's ice hockey season =

- Conference: Hockey East
- Home ice: XL Center

Record
- Overall: 11–21–4 (6–12–4)
- Home: 5–12–1
- Road: 5–7–3
- Neutral: 1–2–0

Coaches and captains
- Head coach: Mike Cavanaugh
- Assistant coaches: Michael Souza; Joe Pereira; Andrew Raycroft

The 2015–16 UConn Huskies men's ice hockey team represented the University of Connecticut in the 2015–16 NCAA Division I men's ice hockey season. The team was coached by Mike Cavanaugh his third season behind the bench at UConn. The Huskies played their home games at the XL Center in downtown Hartford, Connecticut, competing in their second season in Hockey East.

== Personnel ==
=== Roster ===
As of September 4, 2015.

No.	Nat.	Player	Class	Pos	Height	Weight	DoB	Hometown	Previous team	NHL rights
1		Tanner Creel	Sophomore	G	5' 10" (1.78 m)	175 lb (79 kg)	1994-04-10	Arlington Heights, Illinois	Odessa (NAHL)	—
2		Derek Pratt (A)	Sophomore	D	6' 2" (1.88 m)	195 lb (88 kg)	1994-03-12	Mount Hermon, Massachusetts	Waterloo (USHL)	—
3		Ryan Segalla	Junior	D	6' 1" (1.85 m)	198 lb (90 kg)	1994-12-29	Rockland, Massachusetts	Salisbury (USHS–CT)	PIT, 119th overall 2013
4		Kyle Huson	Senior	D	6' 6" (1.98 m)	215 lb (98 kg)	1991-10-31	Parker, Colorado	Wenatchee (NAHL)	—
5		David Drake	Sophomore	D	6' 6" (1.98 m)	190 lb (86 kg)	1995-01-07	Naperville, Illinois	Des Moines (USHL)	PHI, 192nd overall 2013
6		Johnny Austin	Sophomore	D	5' 11" (1.8 m)	200 lb (91 kg)	1995-07-22	St. Louis Park, Minnesota	Benilde-St. Margaret's (USHS–MN)	—
7		Joona Koonas	Junior	D	6' 4" (1.93 m)	205 lb (93 kg)	1993-07-28	Vintaa, Finland	Islanders (USPHL)	—
8		Spencer Naas	Sophomore	F	5' 11" (1.8 m)	185 lb (84 kg)	1994-07-14	St. Louis Park, Minnesota	Benilde-St. Margaret's (USHS–MN)	—
9		Shawn Pauly (A)	Senior	F	6' 1" (1.85 m)	190 lb (86 kg)	1992-01-08	Bellingham, Washington	Wenatchee (NAHL)	—
10		Miles Gendron	Freshman	D	6' 3" (1.91 m)	192 lb (87 kg)	1996-06-28	Shrewsbury, Massachusetts	Penticton (BCHL)	OTT, 70th overall 2014
11		Corey Ronan	Sophomore	F	5' 8" (1.73 m)	175 lb (79 kg)	1995-10-06	Franklin, Massachusetts	St. Sebastian's (USHS–MA)	—
13		Joseph Masonius	Freshman	D	6' 0" (1.83 m)	190 lb (86 kg)	1997-02-17	Spring Lake, New Jersey	USNTDP (USHL)	—
14		Will Golonka	Sophomore	F	5' 11" (1.8 m)	170 lb (77 kg)	1995-02-02	Carlisle, Massachusetts	Belmont Hill (USHS–MA)	—
16		Karl El-Mir	Freshman	F	6' 0" (1.83 m)	175 lb (79 kg)	1996-03-14	Montreal, Quebec	Grande Prairie (AJHL)	—
17		Jesse Schwartz	Sophomore	F	6' 0" (1.83 m)	195 lb (88 kg)	1994-04-10	Toronto, Ontario	Victoria (BCHL)	—
18		Max Kalter	Freshman	F	5' 8" (1.73 m)	161 lb (73 kg)	1996-03-01	Highland Park, Illinois	Sioux City (USHL)	—
19		Evan Richardson	Junior	F	5' 8" (1.73 m)	175 lb (79 kg)	1994-05-30	Nanaimo, British Columbia	Boston College (HEA)	—
21		Jeff Wight	Sophomore	F	6' 3" (1.91 m)	200 lb (91 kg)	1995-12-04	Coquitlam, British Columbia	Merritt (BCHL)	—
22		Marco Richter	Freshman	F	6' 1" (1.85 m)	187 lb (85 kg)	1995-11-19	Vienna, Austria	Madison (USHL)	—
23		Kasperi Ojantakanen	Sophomore	F	6' 0" (1.83 m)	175 lb (79 kg)	1995-01-12	Helsinki, Finland	Jokerit U20 (Nuorten SM-liiga)	—
24		Patrick Kirtland (C)	Senior	F	6' 1" (1.85 m)	200 lb (91 kg)	1991-01-22	Rocky Hill, Connecticut	Des Moines (USHL)	—
28		Joey Ferriss	Senior	F	6' 2" (1.88 m)	185 lb (84 kg)	1992-12-28	Novi, Michigan	Michigan (NAHL)	—
27		Max Letunov	Freshman	F	6' 4" (1.93 m)	170 lb (77 kg)	1996-02-20	Moscow, Russia	Youngstown (USHL)	ARI, 52nd overall 2014
29		Tage Thompson	Freshman	F	6' 5" (1.96 m)	190 lb (86 kg)	1997-10-30	Orange, Connecticut	USNTDP (USHL)	—
31		Rob Nichols	Junior	G	5' 11" (1.8 m)	185 lb (84 kg)	1992-09-10	Dallas, Texas	Wenatchee (NAHL)	—
35		Steve Thulin	Sophomore	G	6' 3" (1.91 m)	170 lb (77 kg)	1993-02-02	North Reading, Massachusetts	Connecticut (USPHL)	—

=== Coaching staff ===
Name	Position	Seasons at UConn	Alma mater
Mike Cavanaugh	Head Coach	3	Bowdoin College (1990)
Joe Pereira	Assistant coach	3	Boston University (2011)
Brendan Buckley	Assistant coach	1	Boston College (1999)
Andrew Raycroft	Assistant coach	2	

== Standings ==
2015–16 Hockey East men's standings
	Conference record							Overall record					
	GP	W	L	T	PTS	GF	GA	GP	W	L	T	GF	GA
#5 Boston College †	22	15	2	5	35	91	45	41	28	8	5	156	82
#3 Providence †	22	16	3	3	35	71	39	38	27	7	4	124	71
#13 Notre Dame	22	15	5	2	32	70	40	37	19	11	7	115	86
#8 Massachusetts–Lowell	22	12	6	4	28	58	37	40	25	10	5	121	75
#11 Boston University	22	12	6	4	28	75	56	36	21	10	5	124	106
#14 Northeastern *	22	10	8	4	24	75	56	41	22	14	5	134	105
Merrimack	22	5	10	7	17	50	70	39	13	19	7	95	108
Connecticut	22	6	12	4	16	49	70	36	11	21	4	88	114
Vermont	22	6	13	3	15	48	66	40	15	22	3	86	107
New Hampshire	22	4	12	6	14	57	73	37	11	20	6	112	121
Maine	22	5	15	2	12	42	77	38	8	24	6	76	129
Massachusetts	22	2	16	4	8	44	101	36	8	24	4	84	146
Championship: March 19, 2016 † indicates conference regular season champion; * indicates conference tournament champion Rankings: USCHO.com Top 20 Poll; updated March 8, 2016

== Schedule ==
=== Regular season ===
Date	Time	Opponent^{#}	Rank^{#}	Site	TV	Result	Attendance	Record
Exhibition
October 3	3:05 pm	Queen's*		Mark Edward Freitas Ice Forum • Storrs, Connecticut		W 3–1	1,158	
Regular Season
October 9	8:07 pm	at Alabama–Huntsville*		Von Braun Center • Huntsville, Alabama		W 5–2	2,193	1–0–0
October 10	8:07 pm	Alabama–Huntsville*		Von Braun Center • Huntsville, Alabama		L 2–5	1,604	1–1–0
October 16	7:05 pm	Arizona State*		XL Center • Hartford, Connecticut		W 5–1	4,404	2–1–0
October 24	4:00 PM	at #8 Boston University		Agganis Arena • Boston, Massachusetts		L 2–4	4,199	2–2–0 (0–1–0)
October 27	7:05 pm	#8 Boston University		XL Center • Hartford, Connecticut		W 5–2	5,225	3–2–0 (1–1–0)
October 31	3:05 pm	Notre Dame		XL Center • Hartford, Connecticut		L 1–2	5,190	3–3–0 (1–2–0)
November 1	2:35 pm	vs. Notre Dame		Barclays Center • Brooklyn, New York		L 2–8	3,014	3–4–0 (1–3–0)
November 6	7:05 pm	UMass		XL Center • Hartford, Connecticut		L 2–4	5,075	3–5–0 (1–4–0)
November 7	7:30 pm	at UMass		Mullins Center • Amherst, Massachusetts		L 3–5	3,840	3–6–0 (1–5–0)
November 10	7:05 pm	Army*		XL Center • Hartford, Connecticut		L 0–2	3,883	3–7–0
November 13	7:05 pm	at Vermont		Gutterson Fieldhouse • Burlington, Vermont		L 1–2	4,007	3–8–0 (1–6–0)
November 17	7:05 pm	#3 Quinnipiac*		XL Center • Hartford, Connecticut		L 2–6	5,476	3–9–0
November 24	7:05 pm	#2 Boston College		XL Center • Hartford, Connecticut		L 1–5	7,219	3–10–0 (1–7–0)
December 5	3:05 pm	#5 UMass Lowell		XL Center • Hartford, Connecticut		W 4–3	4,811	4–10–0 (2–7–0)
December 6	1:00 pm	at #5 UMass Lowell		Tsongas Center • Lowell, Massachusetts	NESN/SNY	W 2–1	5,216	5–10–0 (3–7–0)
December 11	7:05 pm	#19 Merrimack		XL Center • Hartford, Connecticut		T 3–3 ^{OT}	4,814	5–10–1 (3–7–1)
January 1	8:00 pm	at Minnesota*		Mariucci Arena • Minneapolis, Minnesota (Mariucci Classic)	FSN	L 2–3	9,561	5–11–1
January 2	5:00 pm	vs. Ferris State*		Mariucci Arena • Minneapolis, Minnesota (Mariucci Classic)		L 2–5	9,726	5–12–1
January 5	9:30 pm	at Arizona State*		Oceanside Ice Arena • Tempe, Arizona		W 5–2	713	6–12–1
January 8	7:00 pm	vs. Michigan Tech*		Gila River Arena • Glendale, Arizona (Desert Hockey Classic)		L 2–4	5,028	6–13–1
January 10	5:00 pm	vs. Arizona State*		Gila River Arena • Glendale, Arizona (Desert Hockey Classic)		W 3–0	3,798	7–13–1
January 15	7:00 pm	at Maine		Alfond Arena • Orono, Maine		W 1–0	3,215	8–13–1 (4–7–1)
January 16	7:00 pm	at Maine		Alfond Arena • Orono, Maine	FCS Atlantic	T 1–1 ^{OT}	3,891	8–13–2 (4–7–2)
January 22	8:30 pm	Vermont		XL Center • Hartford, Connecticut	NESN/SNY	L 2–4	6,442	8–14–2 (4–8–2)
January 23	7:00 pm	at #4 Boston College		Conte Forum • Chestnut Hill, Massachusetts		T 3–3 ^{OT}	6,063	8–14–3 (4–8–3)
January 26	7:05 pm	Sacred Heart*		XL Center • Hartford, Connecticut		L 4–7	3,610	8–15–3
February 2	7:05 pm	Brown*		XL Center • Hartford, Connecticut		W 3–1	3,636	9–15–3
February 6	7:00 pm	at Merrimack		Lawler Arena • North Andover, Massachusetts	FCSA/ESPN3	T 2–2 ^{OT}	2,358	9–15–4 (4–8–4)
February 12	7:00 pm	at #5 Providence		Schneider Arena • Providence, Rhode Island	OSN	L 0–4	2,972	9–16–4 (4–9–4)
February 13	5:05 pm	#5 Providence		XL Center • Hartford, Connecticut		L 2–3	6,844	9–17–4 (4–10–4)
February 19	7:05 pm	Northeastern		XL Center • Hartford, Connecticut		L 2–5	5,689	9–18–4 (4–11–4)
February 20	7:00 pm	at Northeastern		Matthews Arena • Boston, Massachusetts		L 1–4	2,331	9–19–4 (4–12–4)
February 26	7:05 pm	New Hampshire		XL Center • Hartford, Connecticut		W 4–1	6,254	10–19–4 (5–12–4)
February 27	7:00 pm	at New Hampshire		Whittemore Center • Durham, New Hampshire	FCSA	W 5–4 ^{OT}	5,301	11–19–4 (6–12–4)
Hockey East Tournament
March 4	7:05 pm	Vermont		XL Center • Hartford, Connecticut (Opening Round)		L 1–2	4,045	11–20–4
March 5	7:05 pm	Vermont		XL Center • Hartford, Connecticut (Opening Round)		L 3–4	4,572	11–21–4
*Non-conference game. ^{#}Rankings from USCHO.com Poll. All times are in Eastern Time.
