= 2016 WCHA men's ice hockey tournament =

2016 WCHA Men's ice hockey tournament
- Dates: March 11–19, 2016
- Teams: 8
- Finals site: Van Andel Arena; Grand Rapids, Michigan
- Champions: Ferris State (1st title)
- Winning coach: Bob Daniels (1st title)
- MVP: Darren Smith (Ferris State)
- WCHA Men's Ice Hockey Tournaments

The 2016 WCHA Men's Ice Hockey Tournament was the 57th conference playoff in league history and 62nd season where a WCHA champion was crowned. The 2016 tournament was played between March 11 and March 19, 2016, at four conference arenas and the Van Andel Arena in Grand Rapids, Michigan. By winning the tournament, Ferris State was awarded the Broadmoor Trophy and received the WCHA's automatic bid to the 2016 NCAA Division I Men's Ice Hockey Tournament.

This was the last WCHA tournament where an All-Tournament Team was named. This is also the only year with an All-Tournament Team where the Tournament MVP was not also named to the All-Tournament Team.

== Format ==
The first round of the postseason tournament features a best-of-three games format. The top eight conference teams participate in the tournament. Teams are seeded No. 1 through No. 8 according to their final conference standing, with a tiebreaker system used to seed teams with an identical number of points accumulated. The top four seeded teams each earn home ice and host one of the lower seeded teams.

The winners of the first round series advance to the Van Andel Arena for the WCHA Final Five, a holdover from previous tournaments where it was used as the collective name of the quarterfinal, semifinal, and championship rounds. The Final Five uses a single-elimination format. Teams are re-seeded No. 1 through No. 4 according to the final regular season conference standings.

=== Conference standings ===
Note: GP = Games played; W = Wins; L = Losses; T = Ties; PTS = Points; GF = Goals For; GA = Goals Against

2015–16 Western Collegiate Hockey Association standings
	Conference record							Overall record					
	GP	W	L	T	PTS	GF	GA	GP	W	L	T	GF	GA
#12 Michigan Tech †	28	18	7	3	39	92	55	37	23	9	5	123	77
#15 Minnesota State †	28	16	5	7	39	82	48	41	21	13	7	105	80
Bowling Green	28	16	7	5	37	81	59	42	22	14	6	118	91
Ferris State*	28	13	11	4	30	73	70	41	20	15	6	112	109
Northern Michigan	28	12	11	5	29	65	69	38	15	16	7	89	99
Bemidji State	28	11	12	5	27	66	66	39	17	16	6	96	96
Lake Superior State	28	10	13	5	25	49	71	41	14	22	5	74	105
Alaska	28	8	16	4	20	65	87	36	10	22	4	86	117
Alaska Anchorage	28	8	18	2	18	63	84	34	11	20	3	81	103
Alabama–Huntsville	28	5	17	6	16	61	88	34	7	21	6	73	106
Championship: Ferris State † indicates conference regular season champion (MacNaughton Cup); * indicates conference tournament champion (Broadmoor Trophy); Rankings: USCHO.com Top 20 Poll; updated March 8, 2016

== Bracket ==
Teams are reseeded after the first round

First round March 11–13
1	Michigan Tech	7	5	—
8	Alaska	1	3	—
2	Minnesota State	5	0	3
7	Lake Superior State	2	2	0
(Pairings are reseeded after the first round)
3	Bowling Green	1	7	3
6	Bemidji State	3	2	1
4	Ferris State	3	5	—
5	Northern Michigan	2	2	—

Semifinals; March 18
1	Michigan Tech	0
4	Ferris State	1
2	Minnesota State	2
3	Bowling Green	1

Championship; March 19
4	Ferris State	2
2	Minnesota State	1

Note: * denotes overtime periods

== Results ==
=== First round ===
All times are local.

==== (1) Michigan Tech vs. (8) Alaska ====
March 11, 2016; 7:07 pm CDT	(8) Alaska	1 – 7 (1–2, 0–3, 0–2)	(1) Michigan Tech	MacInnes Student Ice Arena, Houghton, MI; Attendance: 2,709

Game reference

Davis Jones (40:00)
Jesse Jenks (20:00)
Goalies
Jamie Phillips
Referees:
Mike Elam
Dan Kovarik
Linesmen:
Eric Froberg
Dan Juopperi

	0 – 1	8:36 – Joel L'Esperance (Gould, Watson)
Tyler Morley – 11:05	1 – 1
	1 – 2	13:29 – Dylan Steman (Petan, Watson)
	1 – 3	4:05 – Jake Lucchini (Vallis, Roy)
	1 – 4	13:12 – Joel L'Esperance (Heinonen, Steman)
	1 – 5	14:28 – Alex Gillies (Lucchini, Hanna)
	1 – 6	7:38 – Cliff Watson (Heinonen, Steman)
	1 – 7	15:24 – C.J. Eick (Petan, Watson)

8 min
Penalties
8 min
21
Shots
42

March 12, 2016; 7:07 pm CDT	(8) Alaska	3 – 5 (1–2, 2–2, 0–1)	(1) Michigan Tech	MacInnes Student Ice Arena, Houghton, MI; Attendance: 3,018

Game reference

Davis Jones
Goalies
Jamie Phillips
Referees:
Mike Elam
Dan Kovarik
Linesmen:
Eric Froberg
Dan Juopperi

Chad Staley (Erickson, Morley) – 2:27	1 – 0
	1 – 1	12:09 – Alex Petan
	1 – 2	12:40 – Reid Sturos (Vallis, Neville)
	1 – 3	3:48 – Alex Gillies (Baltus, Auk)
	1 – 4	4:39 – Joel L'Esperance (Eick, Vallis)
Tyler Morley (Atkinson, Woods) – pp – 11:46	2 – 4
Marcus Basara (Atkinson, Huysmans) – pp – 17:23	3 – 4
	3 – 5	19:25 – en – Malcolm Gould

8 min
Penalties
8 min
24
Shots
40

==== (2) Minnesota State vs. (7) Lake Superior State ====
March 11, 2016; 7:07 pm CDT	(7) Lake Superior State	2 – 5	(2) Minnesota State

March 12, 2016; 7:07 pm CDT	(7) Lake Superior State	2 – 0	(2) Minnesota State

March 13, 2016; 7:07 pm CDT	(7) Lake Superior State	0 – 3	(2) Minnesota State

==== (3) Bowling Green vs. (6) Bemidji State ====
March 11, 2016; 7:07 pm CDT	(6) Bemidji State	3 – 1	(3) Bowling Green

March 12, 2016; 7:07 pm CDT	(6) Bemidji State	2 – 7	(3) Bowling Green

March 13, 2016; 7:07 pm CDT	(6) Bemidji State	1 – 3	(3) Bowling Green

==== (4) Ferris State vs. (5) Northern Michigan ====
March 11, 2016; 7:07 pm CDT	(5) Northern Michigan	2 – 3	(4) Ferris State

March 12, 2016; 7:07 pm CDT	(5) Northern Michigan	2 – 5	(4) Ferris State

=== Semifinals ===
All times are local (UTC−4).

==== (3) Bowling Green vs. (2) Minnesota State ====
March 18, 2016; 4:07 pm EDT	(3) Bowling Green	1 – 2 (0–2, 0–0, 1–0)	(2) Minnesota State	Van Andel Arena, Grand Rapids, Michigan; Attendance: 5,044

Game reference

Chris Nell
Goalies
Cole Huggins
Referees:
Pete Friesema
Tony Czech
Linesmen:
Dan Juopperi
Eric Froberg

	0 – 1	5:18 – Brad McClure (Brickley)
	0 – 2	7:00 – Casey Nelson (Franklin, Knutson)
Mitchell McLain (Pohlkamp, Cooper) – pp – 16:05	1 – 2

12 min
Penalties
8 min
24
Shots
23

==== (4) Ferris State vs. (1) Michigan Tech ====
March 18, 2016; 7:37 pm EDT	(4) Ferris State	1 – 0 (0–0, 0–0, 1–0)	(1) Michigan Tech	Van Andel Arena, Grand Rapids, Michigan; Attendance: 5,044

Game reference
Darren Smith	Goalies	Jamie Phillips	Referees: Tony Czech; Chris Perrault; Linesmen: Rick Nelson; Matt Tyree
Kenny Babinski (Dorantes, O'Rourke) – 11:15 / 1 – 0			Referees: Tony Czech; Chris Perrault; Linesmen: Rick Nelson; Matt Tyree
8 min	Penalties	12 min	Referees: Tony Czech; Chris Perrault; Linesmen: Rick Nelson; Matt Tyree
33	Shots	30	Referees: Tony Czech; Chris Perrault; Linesmen: Rick Nelson; Matt Tyree

=== Championship ===
All times are local (UTC−4).

==== (4) Ferris State vs. (2) Minnesota State ====
March 19, 2016; 6:07 pm EDT	(4) Ferris State	2 – 1 (1–1, 1–0, 0–0)	(2) Minnesota State	Van Andel Arena, Grand Rapids, Michigan; Attendance: 4,048

Game reference

Darren Smith
Goalies
Cole Huggins
Referees:
Tony Czech
Chris Perrault
Linesmen:
Rick Nelson
Matt Tyree

	0 – 1	10:33 – pp – Bryce Gervais (McClure, Jutzi)
Brandon Anselmini (Lowney, Dorantes) – pp – 14:55	1 – 1
Gerald Mayhew – ps – 19:34	2 – 1

27 min
Penalties
31 min
29
Shots
14

== Tournament awards ==
=== All-Tournament Team ===
- F Kenny Babinski (Ferris State)
- F Gerald Mayhew (Ferris State)
- F Brad McClure (Minnesota State)
- D Brandon Anselmini (Ferris State)
- D Casey Nelson (Minnesota State)
- G Cole Huggins (Minnesota State)

=== Most Valuable Player ===
G Darren Smith (Ferris State)
