= 2015–16 Alabama–Huntsville Chargers men's ice hockey season =

American college ice hockey team season

2015–16 Alabama–Huntsville Chargers men's ice hockey
- Conference: Western Collegiate Hockey Association
- Record: 7–21–6 (5–17–6 WCHA)
- Head coach: Mike Corbett (3rd season)
- Assistant coaches: Gavin Morgan; Matty Thomas
- Captain: Brent Fletcher
- Alternate captain: Chad Brears, Frank Misuraca
- Home stadium: Propst Arena at the Von Braun Center

The 2015–16 Alabama–Huntsville Chargers ice hockey team represented the University of Alabama in Huntsville in the 2015–16 NCAA Division I men's ice hockey season. The Chargers were coached by Mike Corbett who was in his third season as head coach. His assistant coaches were Gavin Morgan and Matty Thomas. The Chargers played their home games in the Propst Arena at the Von Braun Center and competed in the Western Collegiate Hockey Association.

== Recruiting ==
UAH added 9 freshmen for the 2015–16 season, including 6 forwards and 3 defensemen.

Player	Position	Nationality	Notes
Hunter Anderson	Forward	United States	Savage, Minnesota; #1 overall pick in the 2014 NAHL draft
Madison Dunn	Forward	Canada	Calgary, Alberta; 2013 AJHL & RBC Cup champion with the Brooks Bandits
Hans Gorowsky	Forward	United States	Lino Lakes, Minnesota; 2014 NAHL champion with the Fairbanks Ice Dogs
Kurt Gosselin	Defenseman	United States	Brighton, Michigan; former Alberni Valley Bulldogs alternate captain, 2014–15 BCHL First Team All-Star
Jetlan Houcher	Forward	Canada	Paradise Valley, Alberta; former Fort McMurray Oil Barons captain, 2011 AJHL champion with the Spruce Grove Saints, 2014–15 AJHL North All-Star Team, led AJHL in goals in 2014–15
Cam Knight	Defenseman	United States	North Reading, Massachusetts; 2014–15 NAHL All-Rookie First Team
Tyler Poulsen	Forward	United States	Arvada, Colorado; former Topeka Roadrunners alternate captain, 2013–14 All-NAHL Team
John Teets	Defenseman	United States	Fairbanks, Alaska
Adam Wilcox	Forward	United States	Alpharetta, Georgia; 2011 USHL Champion with the Dubuque Fighting Saints

== Roster ==
=== Departures from 2014–15 team ===
- Alex Carpenter, F, Graduated
- Craig Pierce, F, Graduated
- Doug Reid, F, Graduated, signed with the Knoxville Ice Bears (SPHL)
- Ben Reinhardt, D, Graduated
- Bryan Siersma, F, joined UAH's lacrosse team
- Graeme Strukoff, D, Graduated, signed with the Fayetteville FireAntz (SPHL)
- Jeff Vanderlugt, F, Graduated

=== 2015–16 team ===
As of November 16, 2015

No.	Nat.	Player	Class	Pos	Height	Weight	DoB	Hometown	Previous team
2		Cam Knight	Freshman	D	6' 1" (1.85 m)	190 lb (86 kg)	1995-01-10	North Reading, Massachusetts	Wichita Falls (NAHL)
3		Anderson White	Senior	D	6' 4" (1.93 m)	200 lb (91 kg)	1991-08-16	Caledon, Ontario	Chilliwack (BCHL)
4		Frank Misuraca (A)	Senior	D	5' 11" (1.8 m)	195 lb (88 kg)	1991-09-06	Clinton Township, Michigan	Corpus Christi (NAHL)
5		Cody Champagne	Sophomore	D	5' 11" (1.8 m)	185 lb (84 kg)	1994-08-09	Brookfield, Connecticut	Topeka (NAHL)
6		Brandon Carlson	Junior	D	6' 2" (1.88 m)	200 lb (91 kg)	1992-06-15	Huntington Beach, California	Dubuque (USHL)
7		Max McHugh	Sophomore	F	5' 10" (1.78 m)	170 lb (77 kg)	1993-08-20	Seattle, Washington	Dubuque (USHL)
8		John Teets	Freshman	D	6' 3" (1.91 m)	194 lb (88 kg)	1994-08-10	Fairbanks, Alaska	Fairbanks (NAHL)
9		Hunter Anderson	Freshman	F	6' 4" (1.93 m)	212 lb (96 kg)	1994-03-01	Savage, Minnesota	Langley (BCHL)
10		Brent Fletcher (C)	Junior	F	6' 2" (1.88 m)	200 lb (91 kg)	1992-05-09	New Westminster, British Columbia	Merritt (BCHL)
11		Jack Prince	Senior	F	6' 1" (1.85 m)	200 lb (91 kg)	1991-02-14	London, England	Texas (NAHL)
12		Regan Soquila	Junior	F	5' 10" (1.78 m)	180 lb (82 kg)	1993-06-03	Maple Ridge, British Columbia	Merritt (BCHL)
14		Madison Dunn	Freshman	F	5' 8" (1.73 m)	165 lb (75 kg)	1995-10-04	Calgary, Alberta	Brooks (AJHL)
15		Hans Gorowsky	Freshman	F	5' 10" (1.78 m)	174 lb (79 kg)	1994-12-20	Lino Lakes, Minnesota	Fairbanks (NAHL)
16		Jetlan Houcher	Freshman	F	6' 1" (1.85 m)	187 lb (85 kg)	1994-02-15	Paradise Valley, Alberta	Brooks (AJHL)
19		Chad Brears (A)	Senior	F	6' 1" (1.85 m)	175 lb (79 kg)	1991-05-08	Cold Lake, Alberta	Merritt (BCHL)
20		Brandon Parker	Sophomore	D	5' 10" (1.78 m)	175 lb (79 kg)	1993-02-17	Faribault, Minnesota	Brookings (NAHL)
21		Tyler Poulsen	Freshman	F	5' 7" (1.7 m)	160 lb (73 kg)	1993-04-01	Arvada, Colorado	Topeka (NAHL)
22		Matt Salhany	Junior	F	5' 10" (1.78 m)	175 lb (79 kg)	1993-01-08	Warwick, Rhode Island	Boston (EJHL)
23		Cody Marooney	Junior	F	6' 1" (1.85 m)	195 lb (88 kg)	1992-07-07	Eden Prairie, Minnesota	Brookings (NAHL)
24		Brennan Saulnier	Sophomore	F	6' 1" (1.85 m)	170 lb (77 kg)	1993-12-29	Halifax, Nova Scotia	Fort McMurray (AJHL)
25		Adam Wilcox	Freshman	F	6' 1" (1.85 m)	201 lb (91 kg)	1994-04-25	Alpharetta, Georgia	Fairbanks (NAHL)
26		Josh Kestner	Sophomore	F	6' 1" (1.85 m)	170 lb (77 kg)	1993-11-08	Huntsville, Alabama	Sarnia (GOJHL)
27		James Block	Sophomore	F	5' 11" (1.8 m)	170 lb (77 kg)	1996-05-24	Wrightstown, Wisconsin	Wrightstown HS (USHS–WI)
28		Kurt Gosselin	Freshman	D	5' 10" (1.78 m)	190 lb (86 kg)	1994-11-30	Brighton, Michigan	Alberni Valley (BCHL)
30		Matt Larose	Junior	G	6' 5" (1.96 m)	215 lb (98 kg)	1992-08-15	Nanaimo, British Columbia	Wellington (OJHL)
32		Jordan Uhelski	Sophomore	G	6' 1" (1.85 m)	185 lb (84 kg)	1993-08-04	Flint, Michigan	Muskegon (USHL)
33		Richard Buri	Sophomore	D	6' 5" (1.96 m)	215 lb (98 kg)	1994-01-12	Nitra, Slovakia	Minnesota (NAHL)
35		Carmine Guerriero	Junior	G	5' 11" (1.8 m)	180 lb (82 kg)	1992-02-20	Montreal, Quebec	Hawkesbury (CCHL)

== Schedule and results ==
- Green background indicates win.
- Red background indicates loss.
- Yellow background indicates tie.

Date	Time	Opponent	Site	Decision	Result	Attendance	Record
Regular Season
October 9	7:00 pm	Connecticut*	Propst Arena • Huntsville, Alabama	Guerriero	L 2–5	2,193	0–1–0
October 10	7:00 pm	Connecticut*	Propst Arena • Huntsville, Alabama	Guerriero	W 5–2	1,604	1–1–0
October 17	6:00 pm	Alabama*	Benton H. Wilcoxon Municipal Ice Complex • Huntsville, Alabama (Exhibition)	Larose	W 11–1	1,248	1–1–0
October 23	7:00 pm	Alaska–Anchorage	Propst Arena • Huntsville, Alabama	Guerriero	T 3–3 ^{OT}	2,166	1–1–1 (0–0–1)
October 24	7:00 pm	Alaska–Anchorage	Propst Arena • Huntsville, Alabama	Guerriero	L 2–3	2,261	1–2–1 (0–1–1)
October 30	6:30 pm	at Lake Superior State	Taffy Abel Arena • Sault Ste. Marie, Michigan	Guerriero	W 5–4 ^{OT}	2,022	2–2–1 (1–1–1)
October 31	6:00 pm	at Lake Superior State	Taffy Abel Arena • Sault Ste. Marie, Michigan	Larose	W 5–0	2,566	3–2–1 (2–1–1)
November 6	7:00 pm	Michigan Tech	Propst Arena • Huntsville, Alabama	Larose	L 2–4	1,821	3–3–1 (2–2–1)
November 7	7:00 pm	Michigan Tech	Propst Arena • Huntsville, Alabama	Guerriero	L 1–2	1,368	3–4–1 (2–3–1)
November 20	6:00 pm	at #15 Bowling Green	BGSU Ice Arena • Bowling Green, Ohio	Larose	L 2–3 ^{OT}	2,393	3–5–1 (2–4–1)
November 21	6:00 pm	at #15 Bowling Green	BGSU Ice Arena • Bowling Green, Ohio	Guerriero	L 3–4	2,220	3–6–1 (2–5–1)
November 25	7:00 pm	Bemidji State	Propst Arena • Huntsville, Alabama	Larose	L 1–4	1,261	3–7–1 (2–6–1)
November 27	7:00 pm	Bemidji State	Propst Arena • Huntsville, Alabama	Guerriero	L 1–4	1,505	3–8–1 (2–7–1)
December 4	7:00 pm	Northern Michigan	Propst Arena • Huntsville, Alabama	Larose	L 3–4	1,288	3–9–1 (2–8–1)
December 5	7:00 pm	Northern Michigan	Propst Arena • Huntsville, Alabama	Guerriero	T 1–1 ^{OT}	1,203	3–9–2 (2–8–2)
December 11	7:00 pm	at #20 Minnesota State	Verizon Wireless Center • Mankato, Minnesota	Guerriero	L 1–2	3,764	3–10–2 (2–9–2)
December 12	7:00 pm	at #20 Minnesota State	Verizon Wireless Center • Mankato, Minnesota	Guerriero	L 1–4	4,068	3–11–2 (2–10–2)
December 18	7:00 pm	Colorado College*	Propst Arena • Huntsville, Alabama	Guerriero	L 2–5	1,287	3–12–2 (2–10–2)
December 19	7:00 pm	Colorado College*	Propst Arena • Huntsville, Alabama	Larose	W 2–1	1,032	4–12–2 (2–10–2)
January 1	7:30 pm	at #2 North Dakota*	Ralph Engelstad Arena • Grand Forks, North Dakota	Guerriero	L 0–1	11,334	4–13–2 (2–10–2)
January 2	7:00 pm	at #2 North Dakota*	Ralph Engelstad Arena • Grand Forks, North Dakota	Guerriero	L 1–4	11,094	4–14–2 (2–10–2)
January 8	7:00 pm	Alaska	Propst Arena • Huntsville, Alabama	Guerriero	L 3–6	3,521	4–15–2 (2–11–2)
January 9	7:00 pm	Alaska	Propst Arena • Huntsville, Alabama	Larose	W 3–1	1,623	5–15–2 (3–11–2)
January 15	6:00 pm	at Ferris State	Ewigleben Arena • Big Rapids, Michigan	Larose	T 3–3 ^{OT}	1,696	5–15–3 (3–11–3)
January 16	6:00 pm	at Ferris State	Ewigleben Arena • Big Rapids, Michigan	Guerriero	L 1–4	1,984	5–16–3 (3–12–3)
January 29	10:00 pm	at Alaska–Anchorage	Sullivan Arena • Anchorage, Alaska	Larose	W 2–1	1,575	6–16–3 (4–12–3)
January 30	10:00 pm	at Alaska–Anchorage	Sullivan Arena • Anchorage, Alaska	Larose	L 3–4	1,799	6–17–3 (4–13–3)
February 12	7:00 pm	#17 Minnesota State	Propst Arena • Huntsville, Alabama	Larose	T 3–3 ^{OT}	1,421	6–17–4 (4–13–4)
February 13	7:00 pm	#17 Minnesota State	Propst Arena • Huntsville, Alabama	Larose	T 1–1 ^{OT}	2,183	6–17–5 (4–13–5)
February 19	6:00 pm	at Northern Michigan	Berry Events Center • Marquette, Michigan	Larose	L 0–3	1,825	6–18–5 (4–14–5)
February 20	6:00 pm	at Northern Michigan	Berry Events Center • Marquette, Michigan	Guerriero	L 1–3	1,975	6–19–5 (4–15–5)
February 26	7:30 pm	at Bemidji State	Sanford Center • Bemidji, Minnesota	Larose	T 1–1 ^{OT}	3,038	6–19–6 (4–15–6)
February 27	7:00 pm	at Bemidji State	Sanford Center • Bemidji, Minnesota	Larose	L 2–6	3,408	6–20–6 (4–16–6)
March 4	7:00 pm	Bowling Green	Propst Arena • Huntsville, Alabama	Larose	W 7–5	2,626	7–20–6 (5–16–6)
March 5	7:00 pm	Bowling Green	Propst Arena • Huntsville, Alabama	Guerriero	L 0–5	2,672	7–21–6 (5–17–6)
*Non-conference game. All times are in Central Time. Source:

=== Standings ===
2015–16 Western Collegiate Hockey Association standings
	Conference record							Overall record					
	GP	W	L	T	PTS	GF	GA	GP	W	L	T	GF	GA
#12 Michigan Tech †	28	18	7	3	39	92	55	37	23	9	5	123	77
#15 Minnesota State †	28	16	5	7	39	82	48	41	21	13	7	105	80
Bowling Green	28	16	7	5	37	81	59	42	22	14	6	118	91
Ferris State*	28	13	11	4	30	73	70	41	20	15	6	112	109
Northern Michigan	28	12	11	5	29	65	69	38	15	16	7	89	99
Bemidji State	28	11	12	5	27	66	66	39	17	16	6	96	96
Lake Superior State	28	10	13	5	25	49	71	41	14	22	5	74	105
Alaska	28	8	16	4	20	65	87	36	10	22	4	86	117
Alaska Anchorage	28	8	18	2	18	63	84	34	11	20	3	81	103
Alabama–Huntsville	28	5	17	6	16	61	88	34	7	21	6	73	106
Championship: Ferris State † indicates conference regular season champion (MacNaughton Cup); * indicates conference tournament champion (Broadmoor Trophy); Rankings: USCHO.com Top 20 Poll; updated March 8, 2016

== Player stats ==
As of March 5, 2016

=== Skaters ===
Player	Pos	Yr	GP	G	A	Pts	PIM	PPG	SHG	GWG
Max McHugh	F	So	34	7	15	22	10	2	0	2
Chad Brears	F	Sr	30	9	10	19	33	3	0	0
Brennan Saulnier	F	So	28	6	11	17	76	0	0	0
Brandon Parker	D	So	34	3	11	14	30	0	0	0
Matt Salhany	F	Jr	33	4	7	11	8	0	2	1
Jetlan Houcher	F	Fr	27	4	6	10	4	3	0	0
Adam Wilcox	F	Fr	33	4	5	9	6	1	1	0
Kurt Gosselin	D	Fr	26	2	7	9	24	0	0	0
Josh Kestner	F	So	26	7	1	8	20	2	0	1
Brent Fletcher	F	Jr	30	4	4	8	33	0	1	0
Cody Marooney	F	Jr	31	4	2	6	16	0	0	2
Tyler Poulsen	F	Fr	29	3	3	6	33	0	0	0
Hans Gorowsky	F	Fr	29	2	4	6	19	0	1	0
Jack Prince	F	Sr	15	0	6	6	0	0	0	0
Madison Dunn	F	Fr	31	4	1	5	29	2	0	0
Regan Soquila	F	Jr	19	3	2	5	16	0	0	0
Brandon Carlson	D	Jr	31	3	2	5	28	1	0	0
Richard Buri	D	So	27	2	3	5	30	0	0	1
Cam Knight	D	Fr	27	1	4	5	10	1	0	0
Frank Misuraca	D	Sr	34	1	4	5	8	0	0	0
Cody Champagne	D	So	33	0	2	2	6	0	0	0
James Block	F	So	1	0	0	0	0	0	0	0
John Teets	D	Fr	1	0	0	0	0	0	0	0
Anderson White	D	Sr	3	0	0	0	7	0	0	0
Matt Larose	G	Jr	17	0	0	0	0	0	0	0
Carmine Guerriero	G	Jr	18	0	0	0	2	0	0	0
Team			34	73	110	183	448	15	5	7

=== Goaltenders ===
Player	Yr	GP	TOI	W	L	T	GA	GAA	SV	SV%	SO
Matt Larose	Jr	17	994:12	5	7	4	43	2.60	502	0.921	1
Carmine Guerriero	Jr	18	1066:40	2	14	2	57	3.21	519	0.901	0
