= Florida College Hockey Classic =

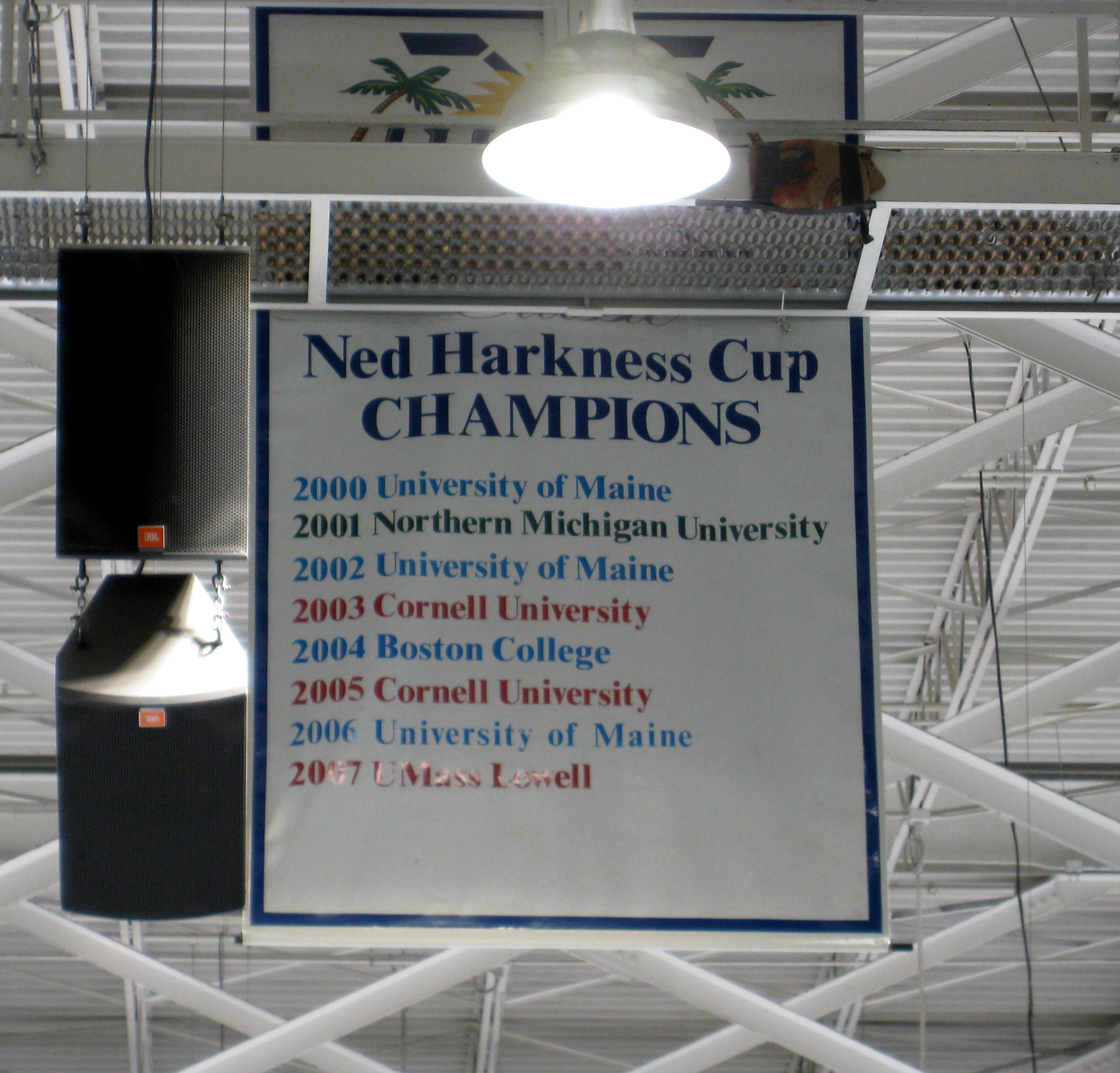
- Banner of Ned Harkness Cup winners as of December 2008

Tournament information
- Sport: College ice hockey
- Location: Estero, Florida
- Number of tournaments: 4
- Format: Single-elimination
- Venue: Germain Arena
- Teams: 4

Current champion
- Colorado College

The Florida College Hockey Classic (formerly the Everblades College Classic) was a college Division I men's ice hockey tournament played annually between 2000 and 2016 in the week between Christmas and New Years at the Germain Arena in Estero, Florida, United States.

First contested in 2000, the four-team tournament was initially jointly hosted by Cornell University and the University of Maine with the remaining slots filled by invitation. In January 2014, after 14 years of participating, Maine announced it was ending its affiliation with the tournament. Florida Everblades owner Craig Brush said that a second host school would be found although this never happened and Cornell hosted alone for the remaining years of the tournament.

The tournament champion was awarded the Ned Harkness Cup, named for the coach that won two NCAA Titles with Cornell and one with Rensselaer Polytechnic Institute. The tournament MVP was awarded the Shawn Walsh Memorial Trophy, named for the coach that took Maine to two NCAA titles.

The final edition of the Florida College Hockey Classic took place 28 and 29 December 2016. In the first round match-ups Cornell defeated Northern Michigan University 5-2 and Colorado College defeated Merrimack College 3–0. Colorado College defeated Cornell 2–1 in overtime in the championship game while Merrimack defeated Northern Michigan 4-2 for third place. This was Colorado College's second appearance at the tournament and first title.

== Yearly results ==
Year	Harkness Cup	Runner-up	Third place	Fourth place	Shawn Walsh Trophy
2016	Colorado College	Cornell	Merrimack	Northern Michigan	Alex Leclerc, Colorado College
2015	Ohio State	Cornell	Providence	Boston College	Christian Frey, Ohio State
2014	Lake Superior State	Notre Dame	Miami (OH)	Cornell	Gordie Defiel, Lake Superior State
2013	Cornell	Maine	New Hampshire	Princeton	Andy Iles, Cornell
2012	Maine	Cornell	Ferris State	Minnesota-Duluth	Kyle Beattie, Maine
2011	Maine	UMass	Cornell	Clarkson	Spencer Abbott, Maine
2010	St. Cloud State	Miami (OH)	Maine	Cornell	Nic Dowd, St. Cloud
2009	Maine	Colorado College	Princeton	Cornell	Scott Darling, Maine
2008	Cornell	Colgate	Maine	St. Cloud State	Ben Scrivens, Cornell
2007	UMass Lowell	Maine	Cornell	Clarkson	Jonathan Maniff, Lowell
2006	Maine	Cornell	New Hampshire	Western Michigan	Teddy Purcell, Maine
2005	Cornell	Minnesota-Duluth	Maine	Northeastern	David McKee, Cornell
2004	Boston College	St. Cloud State	Cornell	Maine	Matti Kaltiainen, BC
2003	Cornell	Ohio State	Notre Dame	Maine	Mike Iggulden, Cornell
2002	Maine	UMass	Ohio State	Cornell	Gray Shaneberger, Maine
2001	Northern Michigan	Maine	Ohio State	Cornell	Craig Kowalski, NMU
2000	Maine	Cornell	Clarkson	Ohio State	Peter Metcalf, Maine

== Team records ==
Team	# of times participated	Titles	Conference*
Maine	14	6	Hockey East
Cornell	17	4	ECAC
Ohio State	5	1	CCHA
St. Cloud	3	1	WCHA
Boston College	2	1	Hockey East
Colorado College	2	1	WCHA/NCHC
Northern Michigan	2	1	WCHA
Lake Superior State	1	1	WCHA
UMass Lowell	1	1	Hockey East
Clarkson	3	0	ECAC
Massachusetts	2	0	Hockey East
Miami	2	0	CCHA/NCHC
Minnesota–Duluth	2	0	WCHA
New Hampshire	2	0	Hockey East
Notre Dame	2	0	Hockey East
Princeton	2	0	ECAC
Colgate	1	0	ECAC
Ferris State	1	0	CCHA
Merrimack	1	0	Hockey East
Northeastern	1	0	Hockey East
Providence	1	0	Hockey East
Western Michigan	1	0	CCHA

*at the time of tournament participation
