= 2015–16 Arizona State Sun Devils men's ice hockey season =

- Conference: Independent
- Home ice: Oceanside Ice Arena; Gila River Arena

Rankings
- USCHO.com: NR
- USA Today/ US Hockey Magazine: NR

Record
- Overall: 5–22–2
- Home: 2–3–2
- Road: 2–18–0
- Neutral: 1–1–0

Coaches and captains
- Head coach: Greg Powers
- Assistant coaches: Mike Field; Alex Hicks
- Captain(s): Liam Norris; Garrett Peterson; Jordan Young

The 2015–16 Arizona State Sun Devils men's ice hockey season was the inaugural season of play for the program at the Division I level. The Sun Devils represented Arizona State University and were coached by Greg Powers, in his 7th season.

== Season ==
With a team composed mostly of ACHA players and freshmen, Arizona State was not expected to be competitive in many of their games. From the start it was apparent that ASU's offense wasn't comparable with other Division I programs and the team struggled to score throughout the season. Against their peers, the Sun Devils were able to score multiple goals in only 6 games. After winning the program's first road sweep in mid-November, ASU lost their next 16 games, only arresting their slide when the team took on Division III Wisconsin–Eau Claire.

Despite the bad results, there were few recriminations for the debutant program. Arizona State had little going in their favor in their first season and growing pains were expected for the nascent team.

== Recruiting ==
Player	Position	Nationality	Age	Notes
Jake Clifford	Defenseman	United States	20	Brecksville, OH
Anthony Croston	Forward	United States	21	Phoenix, AZ
Nicholas Gushue	Defenseman	Canada	20	West Vancouver, BC
Cody Gylling	Forward	United States	21	Chandler, AZ
David Jacobson	Goaltender	United States	21	Calabasas, CA
Matt Kennedy	Forward	Canada	20	Mount Pearl, NL
Brock Krygier	Defenseman	United States	22	Novi, MI; transfer from Michigan State
Joe Lappin	Forward	United States	21	Geneva, IL
Jordan Masters	Forward	United States	21	Rochester, NY
Liam McGing	Defenseman	United States	20	Chicago, IL
Dave Norris	Forward	Canada	21	Calgary, AB; transfer from American International; red shirt
Ryland Pashovitz	Goaltender	Canada	20	Saskatoon, SK
Garrett Peterson	Forward	United States	24	Manhattan, IL; graduate transfer from Notre Dame
Joey Raats	Defenseman	United States	20	Las Vegas, NV
Jack Rowe	Forward	United States	21	Cary, IL
Louie Rowe	Forward	United States	21	East Lansing, MI; red shirt
Ryan Stevens	Forward	United States	20	Euless, TX
Charlie Zuccarini	Forward	United States	20	Shelton, CT

== Roster ==
As of March 20, 2017.

No.	Nat.	Player	Class	Pos	Height	Weight	DoB	Hometown	Previous team	NHL rights
2	(United States)	Drew Newmeyer	Junior	D	5' 11" (1.8 m)	180 lb (82 kg)	1994-03-15	Scottsdale, Arizona	Indiana Ice (USHL)	—
4	(United States)	Ed McGovern	Sophomore	D	5' 10" (1.78 m)	178 lb (81 kg)	1993-05-24	Scottsdale, Arizona	Sioux Falls Stampede (USHL)	—
5	(United States)	Brock Krygier	Junior (RS)	D	6' 0" (1.83 m)	178 lb (81 kg)	1993-12-09	Novi, Michigan	Michigan State (Big Ten)	—
7	(Russia)	Georgi Gorodetsky	Freshman	F	6' 2" (1.88 m)	188 lb (85 kg)	1995-03-28	Yekaterinburg, Russia	Des Moines Buccaneers (USHL)	—
8	(United States)	Joe Lappin	Freshman	F	6' 0" (1.83 m)	183 lb (83 kg)	1994-02-10	Geneva, Illinois	Des Moines Buccaneers (USHL)	—
9	(United States)	Ryan Stevens	Freshman	F	6' 3" (1.91 m)	191 lb (87 kg)	1994-10-16	Euless, Texas	Dubuque Fighting Saints (USHL)	—
11	(United States)	Jack Rowe	Freshman	F	6' 1" (1.85 m)	185 lb (84 kg)	1994-04-07	Cary, Illinois	Des Moines Buccaneers (USPHL)	—
13	(United States)	Sean Murphy	Junior	F	5' 8" (1.73 m)	173 lb (78 kg)	1992-04-06	Cary, North Carolina	Soo Eagles (NAHL)	—
16	(United States)	Ryan Belonger	Junior (RS)	F	5' 10" (1.78 m)	178 lb (81 kg)	1992-05-05	Green Bay, Wisconsin	Northeastern (HEA)	—
17	(United States)	Jordan Masters	Freshman	F	5' 11" (1.8 m)	180 lb (82 kg)	1994-04-30	Rochester, New York	West Kelowna Warriors (BCHL)	—
19	(Canada)	Matt Kennedy	Freshman	F	5' 11" (1.8 m)	180 lb (82 kg)	1995-05-14	Mount Pearl, Newfoundland	Victoria Grizzlies (BCHL)	—
22	(United States)	Jake Clifford	Freshman	D	6' 1" (1.85 m)	185 lb (84 kg)	1994-12-08	Brecksville, Ohio	Merritt Centennials (BCHL)	—
23	(United States)	Jordan Young (C)	Senior	D	5' 11" (1.8 m)	180 lb (82 kg)	1992-05-12	Cave Creek, Arizona	Youngstown Phantoms (USHL)	—
24	(United States)	Liam McGing	Freshman	D	5' 11" (1.8 m)	180 lb (82 kg)	1995-08-04	Chicago, Illinois	Des Moines Buccaneers (USHL)	—
25	(Canada)	Liam Norris (C)	Graduate	F	5' 11" (1.8 m)	181 lb (82 kg)	1991-05-06	Ottawa, Ontario	Calgary Mustangs (AJHL)	—
31	(Canada)	Ryland Pashovitz	Freshman	G	5' 11" (1.8 m)	180 lb (82 kg)	1995-06-20	Saskatoon, Saskatchewan	Des Moines Buccaneers (USHL)	—
33	(United States)	David Jacobson	Freshman	G	6' 1" (1.85 m)	185 lb (84 kg)	1994-09-08	Calabasas, California	Chilliwack Chiefs (BCHL)	—
37	(United States)	Charlie Zuccarini	Freshman	F	5' 7" (1.7 m)	171 lb (78 kg)	1994-10-28	Shelton, Connecticut	Trail Smoke Eaters (BCHL)	—
38	(United States)	Robert Levin	Junior	G	6' 1" (1.85 m)	185 lb (84 kg)	1992-09-22	Highland Park, Illinois	South Shore Kings (EJHL)	—
44	(United States)	Joey Raats	Freshman	D	6' 0" (1.83 m)	183 lb (83 kg)	1995-07-15	Las Vegas, Nevada	Sioux Falls Stampede (USHL)	—
47	(Canada)	Nicholas Gushue	Freshman	D	6' 4" (1.93 m)	193 lb (88 kg)	1994-11-09	West Vancouver, British Columbia	Nanaimo Clippers (BCHL)	—
50	(United States)	Eric Rivard	Junior	F	6' 1" (1.85 m)	185 lb (84 kg)	1992-03-03	Traverse City, Michigan	Soo Eagles (NAHL)	—
68	(United States)	Anthony Croston	Freshman	F	6' 0" (1.83 m)	183 lb (83 kg)	1994-06-13	Phoenix, Arizona	Rio Grande Valley Killer Bees (NAHL)	—
71	(Canada)	Ryan Ostertag	Junior	F	6' 0" (1.83 m)	183 lb (83 kg)	1992-09-20	Regina, Saskatchewan	Weyburn Red Wings (SJHL)	—
74	(United States)	Connor Schmidt	Junior (RS)	D	5' 11" (1.8 m)	180 lb (82 kg)	1993-10-21	Flat Rock, Michigan	Des Moines Buccaneers (USHL)	—
82	(United States)	Michael Cummings	Junior (RS)	F	6' 2" (1.88 m)	188 lb (85 kg)	1992-09-23	San Bernardino, California	Phoenix Knights (WSHL)	—
91	(United States)	Garrett Peterson (C)	Senior (RS)	F	5' 11" (1.8 m)	180 lb (82 kg)	1991-09-13	Manhattan, Illinois	Notre Dame (HEA)	—
94	(United States)	Cody Gylling	Freshman	F	5' 11" (1.8 m)	180 lb (82 kg)	1994-06-20	Chandler, Arizona	Amarillo Bulls (NAHL)	—

== Standings ==
2015–16 NCAA Division I Independent ice hockey standings
	Overall record					
	GP	W	L	T	GF	GA
Arizona State	29	5	22	2	46	116
Rankings: USCHO.com Top 20 Poll; updated March 1, 2016

== Schedule and results ==
Date	Time	Opponent^{#}	Rank^{#}	Site	TV	Decision	Result	Attendance	Record
Exhibition
October 3	7:07 PM	vs. Arizona*		Gila River Arena • Glendale, Arizona		Levin	W 8–1	5,385	
Regular season
Kendall Hockey Classic
October 9	10:15 PM	at Alaska Anchorage*		Sullivan Arena • Anchorage, Alaska (Kendall Hockey Classic Semifinal)		Levin	L 2–3 ^{OT}	2,427	0–1–0
October 10	6:07 PM	vs. Alaska*		Sullivan Arena • Anchorage, Alaska (Kendall Hockey Classic Consolation)		Pashovitz	W 2–1	2,253	1–1–0
October 15	5:00 PM	at #17 Quinnipiac*		People's United Center • Hamden, Connecticut		Pashovitz	L 0–5	3,056	1–2–0
October 16	5:05 PM	at Connecticut*		XL Center • Hartford, Connecticut		Pashovitz	L 1–5	4,404	1–3–0
October 17	5:30 PM	vs. Sacred Heart*		Danbury Ice Arena • Danbury, Connecticut		Pashovitz	L 1–5	1,500	1–4–0
October 23	7:30 PM	vs. Southern New Hampshire*		Oceanside Ice Arena • Tempe, Arizona		Jacobson	W 9–2	752	2–4–0
October 24	7:30 PM	vs. Southern New Hampshire*		Oceanside Ice Arena • Tempe, Arizona		Pashovitz	W 7–1	696	3–4–0
October 30	6:07 PM	at Wisconsin*		Kohl Center • Madison, Wisconsin		Pashovitz	L 1–5	6,665	3–5–0
October 31	6:07 PM	at Wisconsin*		Kohl Center • Madison, Wisconsin		Pashovitz	L 1–2	7,725	3–6–0
November 13	5:37 PM	at Lake Superior State*		Taffy Abel Arena • Sault Ste. Marie, Michigan		Pashovitz	W 3–2	1,978	4–6–0
November 14	5:07 PM	at Lake Superior State*		Taffy Abel Arena • Sault Ste. Marie, Michigan		Pashovitz	W 3–2 ^{OT}	1,977	5–6–0
November 27	5:00 PM	at Clarkson*		Cheel Arena • Potsdam, New York		Pashovitz	L 2–3	2,196	5–7–0
November 28	5:00 PM	at Clarkson*		Cheel Arena • Potsdam, New York		Levin	L 1–4	1,831	5–8–0
December 4	7:37 PM	vs. Alberta*		Oceanside Ice Arena • Tempe, Arizona (Exhibition)		Levin	T 4–4 ^{SOW}	715	
December 5	7:47 PM	vs. Alberta*		Oceanside Ice Arena • Tempe, Arizona (Exhibition)		Jacobson	T 2–2 ^{SOL}	708	
December 11	5:00 PM	at Rensselaer*		Houston Field House • Troy, New York		Pashovitz	L 1–5	3,017	5–9–0
December 12	5:00 PM	at Rensselaer*		Houston Field House • Troy, New York		Levin	L 1–4	2,704	5–10–0
December 19	6:07 PM	at #6 Omaha*		Baxter Arena • Omaha, Nebraska		Pashovitz	L 1–3	5,843	5–11–0
December 20	1:00 PM	at #6 Omaha*		Baxter Arena • Omaha, Nebraska		Levin	L 0–6	5,434	5–12–0
January 1	6:37 PM	at #5 St. Cloud State*		Herb Brooks National Hockey Center • St. Cloud, Minnesota		Pashovitz	L 1–6	4,697	5–13–0
January 2	6:07 PM	at #5 St. Cloud State*		Herb Brooks National Hockey Center • St. Cloud, Minnesota		Levin	L 0–7	4,435	5–14–0
January 5	7:30 PM	vs. Connecticut*		Oceanside Ice Arena • Tempe, Arizona		Jacobson	L 2–5	713	5–15–0
Desert Hockey Classic
January 8	8:00 PM	vs. #12 Yale*		Gila River Arena • Glendale, Arizona (Desert Hockey Classic Semifinal)	Pac-12 Network	Pashovitz	L 0–4	5,028	5–16–0
January 10	3:27 PM	vs. Connecticut*		Gila River Arena • Glendale, Arizona (Desert Hockey Classic Consolation)		Pashovitz	L 0–3	3,798	5–17–0
January 15	6:37 PM	at Bemidji State*		Sanford Center • Bemidji, Minnesota	KAWE	Pashovitz	L 0–5	2,988	5–18–0
January 16	6:07 PM	at Bemidji State*		Sanford Center • Bemidji, Minnesota	KAWE	Levin	L 0–2	3,138	5–19–0
January 22	7:30 PM	vs. Ohio*		Oceanside Ice Arena • Tempe, Arizona (Exhibition)		Levin	W 8–2	767	
January 23	7:30 PM	vs. Ohio*		Oceanside Ice Arena • Tempe, Arizona (Exhibition)		Pashovitz	W 6–1	691	
January 27	5:15 PM	at #8 Massachusetts–Lowell*		Tsongas Center • Lowell, Massachusetts		Levin	L 1–4	5,212	5–20–0
January 30	5:00 PM	at #8 Massachusetts–Lowell*		Tsongas Center • Lowell, Massachusetts		Pashovitz	L 1–8	5,546	5–21–0
January 31	2:05 PM	at Merrimack*		J. Thom Lawler Rink • North Andover, Massachusetts		Pashovitz	L 0–10	2,549	5–22–0
February 5	7:30 PM	vs. Wisconsin–Eau Claire*		Oceanside Ice Arena • Tempe, Arizona		Pashovitz	T 3–3 ^{SOL}	617	5–22–1
February 6	7:30 PM	vs. Wisconsin–Eau Claire*		Oceanside Ice Arena • Tempe, Arizona		Levin	T 3–3 ^{SOW}	627	5–22–2
Exhibition
February 13	5:07 PM	vs. Liberty*		Oceanside Ice Arena • Tempe, Arizona (Exhibition)		Jacobson	W 7–0	560	
February 19	7:30 PM	at Arizona*		Tucson Convention Center • Tucson, Arizona (Exhibition)		Levin	W 6–0	3,500	
February 27	7:30 PM	at USNTDP*		Oceanside Ice Arena • Tempe, Arizona (Exhibition)		Levin	T 2–2 ^{SOL}	695	
February 28	7:05 PM	vs. USNTDP*		Gila River Arena • Glendale, Arizona (Exhibition)	Pac-12 Network	Levin	L 2–5	1,135	
*Non-conference game. ^{#}Rankings from USCHO.com Poll. All times are in Mountain Time.

== Scoring Statistics ==
Name	Position	Games	Goals	Assists	Points	PIM
Jordan Masters	RW	27	8	14	22	46
Joey Raats	D	28	2	13	15	12
Joe Lappin	F	29	5	6	11	8
Ryan Belonger	C/RW	27	4	5	9	25
Liam Norris	F	27	3	6	9	10
Anthony Croston	F	28	2	5	7	35
Cody Gylling	F	25	3	3	6	6
Ryan Stevens	LW	27	3	3	6	32
Nicholas Gushue	D	23	3	2	5	6
Jack Rowe	F	24	3	2	5	6
Ryan Ostertag	RW	18	3	1	4	8
Garrett Peterson	RW	28	2	2	4	29
Liam McGing	D	20	1	3	4	12
Matt Kennedy	F	26	0	4	4	2
Brock Krygier	D	25	1	2	3	10
Charlie Zuccarini	F	8	2	0	2	2
Ed McGovern	D	21	0	2	2	2
Sean Murphy	F	23	1	0	1	6
Eric Rivard	F	7	0	1	1	6
Jake Clifford	D	15	0	1	1	20
Drew Newmeyer	D	18	0	1	1	2
Ryland Pashovitz	RW/C	19	0	1	1	0
Jordan Young	D	21	0	1	1	8
David Jacobson	G	7	0	0	0	0
Robert Levin	G	10	0	0	0	0
Michael Cummings	F	12	0	0	0	33
Connor Schmidt	D	15	0	0	0	16
Bench	-	-	-	-	-	4
Total			46	78	124	368

== Goaltending statistics ==
Name	Games	Minutes	Wins	Losses	Ties	Goals against	Saves	Shut outs	SV %	GAA
David Jacobson	7	253	1	1	0	14	146	0	.912	3.32
Ryland Pashovitz	19	1034	4	14	1	65	587	0	.900	3.77
Robert Levin	10	464	0	7	1	35	247	0	.876	4.53
Empty Net	-	6	-	-	-	2	-	-	-	-
Total	29	1757	5	22	2	116	980	0	.894	3.96

== Rankings ==
Poll	Week																								
Poll	Pre	1	2	3	4	5	6	7	8	9	10	11	12	13	14	15	16	17	18	19	20	21	22	23	24 (Final)
USCHO.com	NR	NR	NR	NR	NR	NR	NR	NR	NR	NR	NR	NR	NR	NR	NR	NR	NR	NR	NR	NR	NR	NR	NR	–	NR
USA Today	NR	NR	NR	NR	NR	NR	NR	NR	NR	NR	NR	NR	NR	NR	NR	NR	NR	NR	NR	NR	NR	NR	NR	NR	NR

*USCHO did not release a poll in week 23.

== Players drafted into the NHL ==
=== 2016 NHL entry draft ===
No Arizona State players were selected in the NHL draft.
