= Desert Hockey Classic =

Annual ASU ice hockey tournament

Tournament information
- Sport: College ice hockey
- Location: Tempe, Arizona
- Number of tournaments: 4
- Format: Single-elimination
- Venue: Mullett Arena
- Teams: 4

Current champion
- Arizona State

The Desert Hockey Classic is an annual mid season ice hockey tournament hosted by Arizona State University.

== History ==
Michigan Tech won the inaugural tournament in 2015. In 2016–2017 the Desert Hockey Classic was moved to Prescott, and later returned to Glendale for the 2018–19 season. The tournament went on hiatus for the 2017–18 and 2019–20 seasons.

In 2017, Arizona State decided to cancel the Desert Hockey Classic in order to participate in the inaugural Ice Vegas Invitational. They won the tournament.

== Championship game ==
Season	Champion	Runner-up	Third place	Fourth place	Venue
2015–16	Michigan Tech (in shootout)	Yale	Connecticut	Arizona State	Gila River Arena, Glendale, Arizona
2016–17	Connecticut	Brown	St. Cloud State	Arizona State	Prescott Valley Event Center, Prescott Valley, Arizona
2017–18	Cancelled	Due to ASU participating in Ice Vegas Invitational			
2018–19	Clarkson	Minnesota Duluth	Arizona State	Minnesota State	Gila River Arena, Glendale, Arizona
2022–23	Michigan Tech	Boston University	Arizona State	Air Force	Mullett Arena, Tempe, Arizona
2023–24	Arizona State	Omaha	Massachusetts Lowell	Harvard	Mullett Arena, Tempe, Arizona
2024–25	Arizona State	Cornell	Massachusetts	Robert Morris	Mullett Arena, Tempe, Arizona
2025–26	Arizona State	Air Force	Michigan Tech	Alaska Anchorage	Mullett Arena, Tempe, Arizona

== MVPs ==
Year	Player	Team	Pos.
2025	Ryan Kirwan	Arizona State	F
2019	Tyler Kielly	Clarkson	G
2017	Rob Nichols	UConn	G

== Team records ==
Team	# of times participated	Titles	Conference
Arizona State	7	2024, 2025, 2026	NCHC
Michigan Tech	3	2016, 2023	CCHA
Connecticut	2	2017	Hockey East
Clarkson	1	2019	ECAC
Air Force	2	0	AHA
Alaska Anchorage	1	0	Independent
Boston University	1	0	Hockey East
Brown	1	0	ECAC
Cornell	1	0	ECAC
Harvard	1	0	ECAC
Massachusetts	1	0	Hockey East
Massachusetts Lowell	1	0	Hockey East
Minnesota Duluth	1	0	NCHC
Minnesota State	1	0	CCHA
Omaha	1	0	NCHC
Robert Morris	1	0	AHA
St. Cloud State	1	0	NCHC
Yale	1	0	ECAC
