= Casey Fitzgerald (ice hockey) =

American ice hockey player (born 1997)

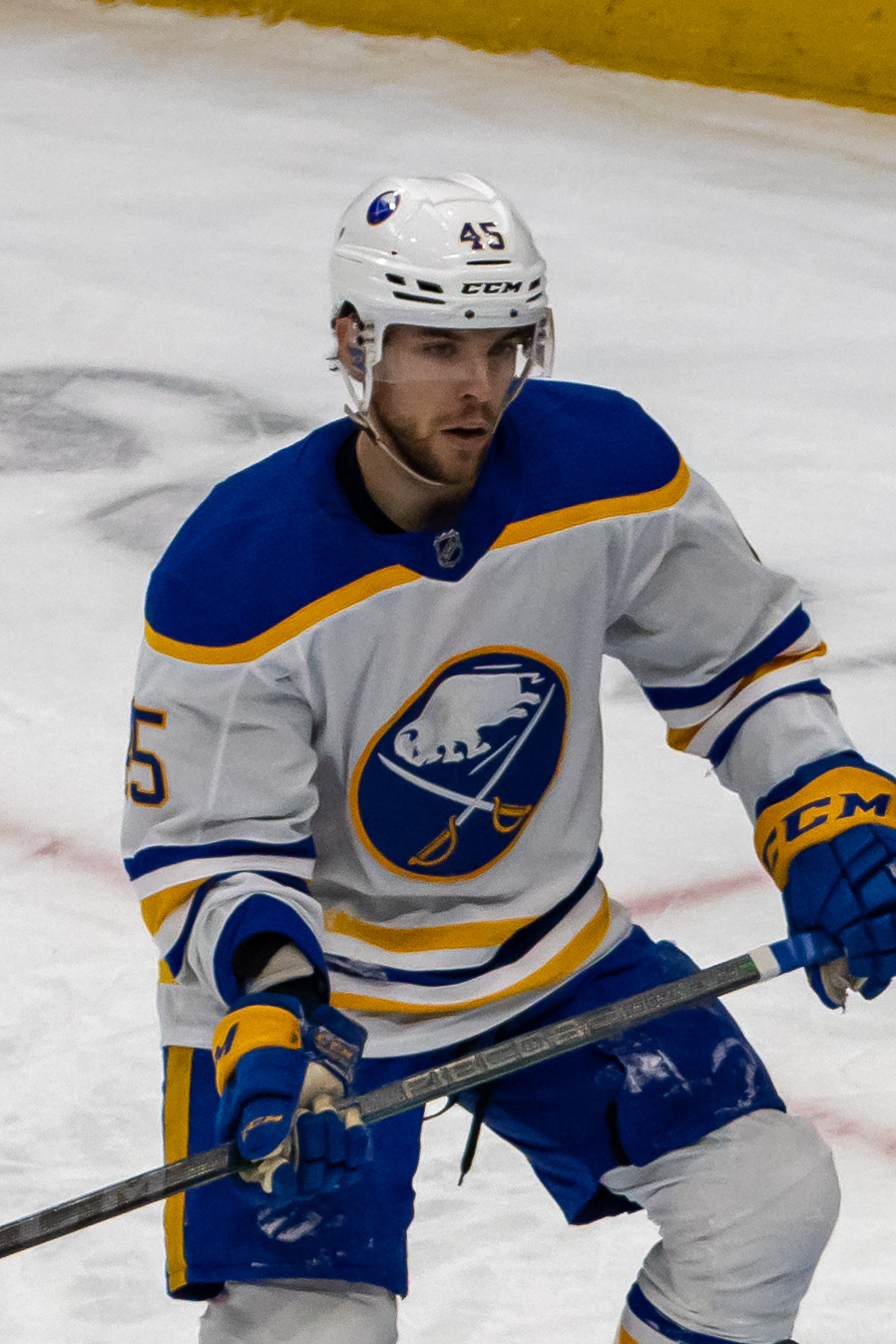
- Fitzgerald with the Buffalo Sabres in 2022
- Born: February 25, 1997 (age 29) Boca Raton, Florida, U.S.
- Height: 5 ft 11 in (180 cm)
- Weight: 185 lb (84 kg; 13 st 3 lb)
- Position: Defense
- Shoots: Right
- NHL team (P) Cur. team Former teams: Florida Panthers; Charlotte Checkers (AHL); Buffalo Sabres
- NHL draft: 86th overall, 2016; Buffalo Sabres
- Playing career: 2019–present

Casey Fitzgerald (born February 25, 1997) is an American professional ice hockey defenseman who plays for the Charlotte Checkers in the American Hockey League (AHL) while under contract to the Florida Panthers of the National Hockey League (NHL). He was selected in the third round (86th overall) of the 2016 NHL entry draft by the Buffalo Sabres.

== Playing career ==
=== Amateur ===
Fitzgerald played youth AAA hockey with the Middlesex Islanders out of North Andover MA. Fitzgerald was a part of the 2014–15 US national under-18 team of the United States Hockey League (USHL), where he won a gold medal and had the best plus/minus rating on the team at the 2015 IIHF World U18 Championships.

=== Collegiate ===
Fitzgerald joined the Boston College Eagles ice hockey team for the 2015–16 season. In his freshman year, he appeared in 39 games and scored 27 points, including 4 goals 23 assists. He was named to the Hockey East Pro Ambitions All-Rookie team at the conclusion of the 2015–16 season.

=== Professional ===
Fitzgerald was drafted in the third round (86th overall) in the 2016 NHL entry draft by the Buffalo Sabres. He made his NHL debut with the Sabres on December 17, 2021 and finished the game with an assist.

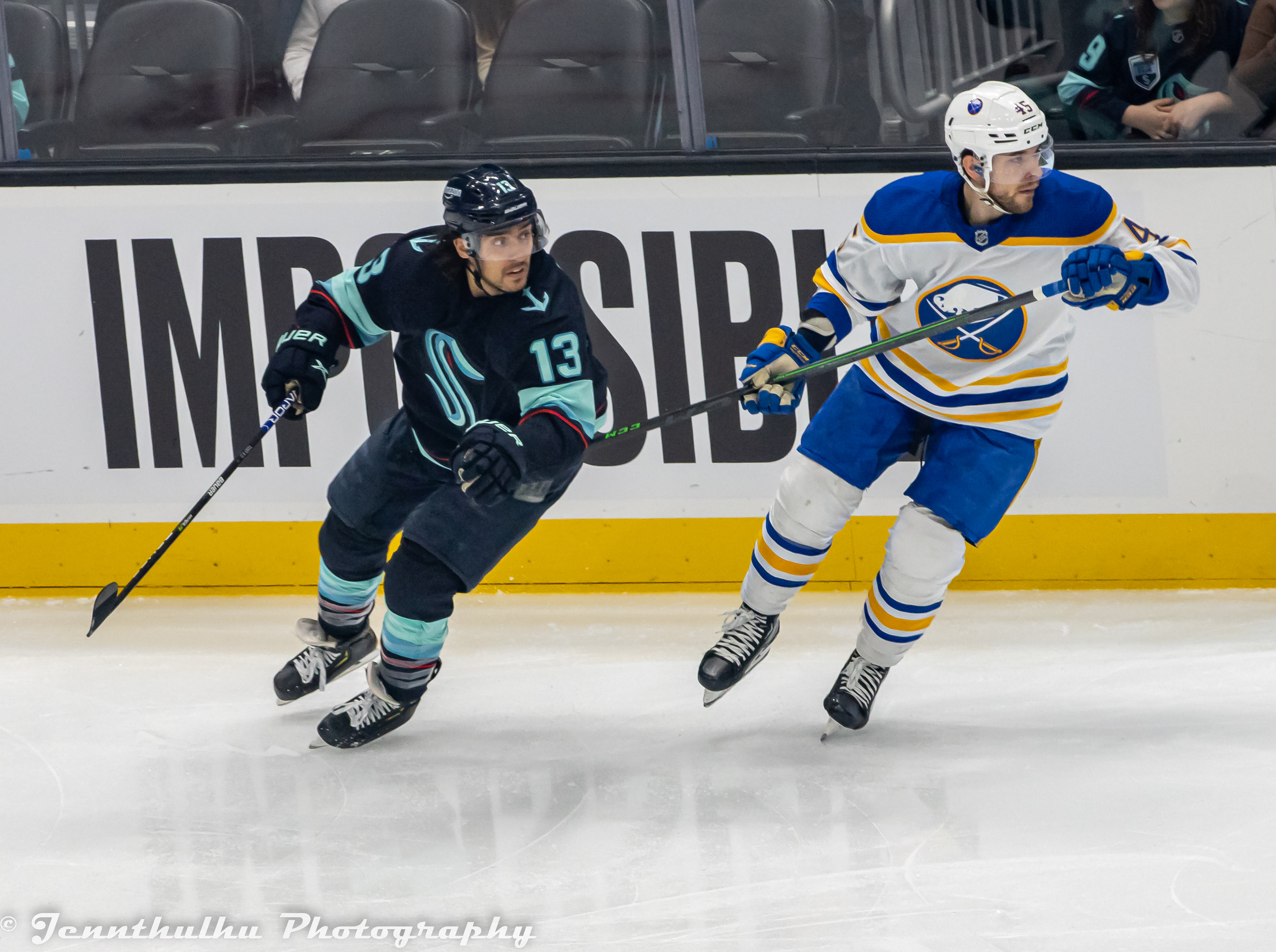
Fitzgerald and Brandon Tanev of the Seattle Kraken in 2022.

After being a healthy scratch for six straight games during the 2022–23 season, Fitzgerald was placed on waivers by the Sabres on January 10, 2023, upon the return of defenseman Henri Jokiharju from injury. He was subsequently claimed off waivers by the Florida Panthers on January 11.

Fitzgerald played just 4 games with the Panthers during the remainder of the season, but was called into action for the postseason. He made his Stanley Cup Playoffs debut in Game 4 of the First Round against the Boston Bruins, subbing in for the injured Aaron Ekblad. On July 17, 2023, he signed a one-year contract extension with the Panthers.

At the conclusion of his contract with the Panthers, Fitzgerald was signed as a free agent to a two-year, two-way contract with the New York Rangers on July 2, 2024.

Having completed his contract with the Rangers, Fitzgerald returned to former club, the Florida Panthers, as a free agent after signing a one-year, two-way contract on July 1, 2026.

== Personal life ==
Fitzgerald is the son of former New Jersey Devils general manager Tom Fitzgerald, and was born in Boca Raton, Florida when his father was a member of the Florida Panthers. As a result of his father's career, he grew up in Florida and Tennessee, before his family settled in North Reading, Massachusetts.

Fitzergald's older brother Ryan was a teammate at Boston College. Ryan was drafted in fourth round (120th overall) by the Boston Bruins in the 2013 NHL entry draft.

== Career statistics ==
=== Regular season and playoffs ===
| | | | Regular season | | | | | Playoffs |
| Season | Team | League | GP | G | A | Pts | PIM | GP | G | A | Pts | PIM |
|---|---|---|---|---|---|---|---|---|---|---|---|---|
| 2013–14 | U.S. National Development Team | USHL | 52 | 3 | 9 | 12 | 43 | — | — | — | — | — |
| 2014–15 | U.S. National Development Team | USHL | 57 | 9 | 16 | 25 | 67 | — | — | — | — | — |
| 2015–16 | Boston College | HE | 39 | 4 | 23 | 27 | 46 | — | — | — | — | — |
| 2016–17 | Boston College | HE | 37 | 5 | 17 | 22 | 46 | — | — | — | — | — |
| 2017–18 | Boston College | HE | 36 | 6 | 13 | 19 | 45 | — | — | — | — | — |
| 2018–19 | Boston College | HE | 39 | 2 | 12 | 14 | 26 | — | — | — | — | — |
| 2018–19 | Rochester Americans | AHL | 4 | 1 | 2 | 3 | 0 | — | — | — | — | — |
| 2019–20 | Rochester Americans | AHL | 25 | 2 | 6 | 8 | 30 | — | — | — | — | — |
| 2020–21 | Rochester Americans | AHL | 22 | 2 | 9 | 11 | 34 | — | — | — | — | — |
| 2021–22 | Rochester Americans | AHL | 28 | 4 | 8 | 12 | 43 | 10 | 2 | 5 | 7 | 11 |
| 2021–22 | Buffalo Sabres | NHL | 36 | 0 | 6 | 6 | 36 | — | — | — | — | — |
| 2022–23 | Buffalo Sabres | NHL | 23 | 0 | 3 | 3 | 4 | — | — | — | — | — |
| 2022–23 | Florida Panthers | NHL | 4 | 0 | 0 | 0 | 0 | 2 | 0 | 0 | 0 | 10 |
| 2023–24 | Charlotte Checkers | AHL | 69 | 4 | 17 | 21 | 65 | 3 | 0 | 0 | 0 | 4 |
| 2024–25 | Hartford Wolf Pack | AHL | 66 | 5 | 16 | 21 | 75 | — | — | — | — | — |
| 2025–26 | Hartford Wolf Pack | AHL | 71 | 4 | 19 | 23 | 85 | — | — | — | — | — |
| NHL totals | | | 63 | 0 | 9 | 9 | 40 | 2 | 0 | 0 | 0 | 10 |

Medal record

Representing United States

ice hockey

IIHF World U18 Championship
| Gold medal – first place | 2015 Switzerland | |

=== International ===
| Year | Team | Event | Result | GP | G | A | Pts | PIM |
|---|---|---|---|---|---|---|---|---|
| 2014 | United States | U17 | 1st place, gold medalist(s) | 6 | 0 | 2 | 2 | 2 |
| 2015 | United States | U18 | 1st place, gold medalist(s) | 7 | 1 | 3 | 4 | 4 |
| 2017 | United States | WJC | 1st place, gold medalist(s) | 7 | 0 | 3 | 3 | 6 |
| Junior totals | | | | 20 | 1 | 8 | 9 | 12 |

Awards and achievements
| Preceded by Dennis Gilbert | Hockey East Best Defensive Defenseman; 2017–18 | Succeeded by Vincent Desharnais |
