= 2015–16 Boston College Eagles men's ice hockey season =

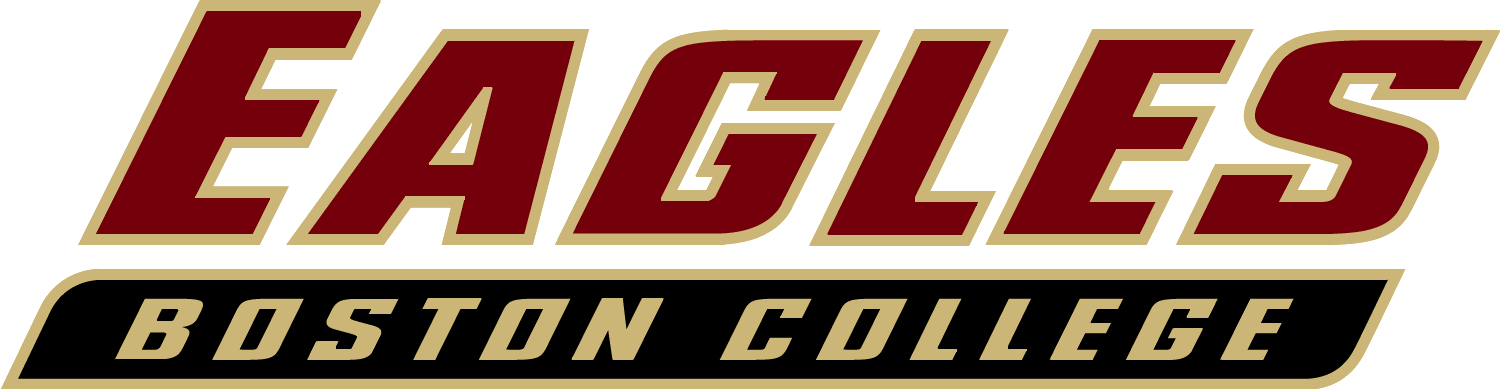

Beanpot championship, W 1–0 (OT) vs. Boston University Hockey East co-regular season champions L 2–3 vs. Quinnipiac in the Frozen Four
- Conference: T-1st Hockey East
- Home ice: Kelley Rink

Rankings
- USCHO.com/CBS College Sports: #3 (Final)
- USA Today/USA Hockey Magazine: #4 (Final)

Record
- Overall: 28–8–5 (15–2–5)
- Home: 14–2–2
- Road: 10–1–3
- Neutral: 4–4–0

Coaches and captains
- Head coach: Jerry York
- Assistant coaches: Greg Brown; Mike Ayers; Marty McInnis
- Captain: Teddy Doherty
- Alternate captain(s): Steven Santini; Chris Calnan; Ian McCoshen

The 2015–16 Boston College Eagles men's ice hockey team represented Boston College in the 2015–16 NCAA Division I men's ice hockey season. The team was coached by Jerry York, '67, his twenty-second season behind the bench at Boston College. The Eagles played their home games at Kelley Rink on the campus of Boston College, competing in Hockey East.

The Eagles competed in two tournaments during the 2015–16 season, the first of which took place during the holiday break, the traditional tournament portion of the college hockey season. The 15th Annual Florida College Hockey Classic, played on December 28 and 29 at Germain Arena in Estero, Florida showcased the Eagles playing Ohio State in the first round, as well as Providence versus host Cornell. The Eagles fell to the Friars of Providence 2–1 in the consolation round, having lost to eventual Harkness Cup winner Ohio State 3–2 in the first round. Boston College previously played in and won the Florida College Hockey Classic in 2004. On February 1 and 8, the Eagles played in the 64th Annual Beanpot Tournament at the TD Garden in Boston, Massachusetts, defeating Harvard 3–2 in the first round and winning the title by defeating Boston University 1–0 in overtime of the championship. They reclaimed the Beanpot trophy after missing the championship match in 2015, having previously won five titles in a row from 2010 to 2014.

The Eagles finished the season 28–8–5, and 15–2–5 in conference play, capturing a share of the Hockey East regular season title, splitting the title with Providence. They advanced to the semifinals of the Hockey East tournament, but lost to Beanpot rival Northeastern, who would eventually win the Hockey East championship for the first time since 1988. They Eagles fared well in the NCAA Tournament as well, where they would win the Northeast Regional, played at the DCU Center in Worcester. After dispatching Harvard in the first round and closely defeating Minnesota-Duluth in the regional final, the Eagles earned a ticket to the program's 25th Frozen Four in Tampa, Florida (an NCAA record for most appearances). There, however, they fell to Quinnipiac 2–3, who advanced to play in the national title game. There, the Bobcats fell to champions North Dakota, 5–1.

== Previous season recap ==
The Eagles entered the 2015–16 season following a first round loss to Denver in the NCAA tournament, and a quarterfinals loss to Vermont in the Hockey East Tournament. The Eagles did capture one trophy during the 2014–15 season, winning the Ledyard Bank Classic with a 3–2 victory over Dartmouth, and finished with a strong 21–14–3 record and 12–7–3 in conference play. They failed to defend their Beanpot title for the first time in six seasons, but picked up the consolation win with a 3–2 victory over Harvard. Noah Hanifin led the way for the Eagles as a freshman, earning All-Second Team honors in Hockey East, while fellow freshman Alex Tuch, who was the team's leading point-scorer, earned a spot on the All-Rookie team.

== Offseason ==
Seven Senior Eagles graduated in May: Assistant Captain Michael Sit – F, Assistant Captain Quinn Smith – F, Destry Straight – F, Cam Spiro – F. Danny Linell – F, Brian Billett – G, and Brad Barone – G.

Junior defenseman Mike Matheson decided to forgo his senior year of eligibility to enter the NHL, signing with his drafted team, the Florida Panthers.

Senior defensemen Teddy Doherty was named Captain, with Juniors Steven Santini, Chris Calnan, and Ian McCoshen named Assistant Captains for the 2015–16 season.

On June 26, freshman defenseman Noah Hanifin was drafted 5th overall by the Carolina Hurricanes in the 2015 NHL entry draft. He signed an entry-level contract with the Hurricanes on July 11, forgoing the rest of his NCAA eligibility.

On September 22, graduated forward Quinn Smith signed with the Idaho Steelheads of the ECHL.

Also in the offseason, graduated forward Destry Straight signed with the Rapid City Rush and graduated goalie Brad Barone with the Elmira Jackals, both of the ECHL.

== Recruiting ==
Boston College added nine freshmen for the 2015–16 season: six forwards, two defensemen, and a goalie.

- Chris Birdsall, G – A well touted goalie with good size and skill, Birdsall will back up Thatcher Demko with the departures of Brad Barone and Brian Billett due to graduation. Birdsall last played for the Youngstown Phantoms of the USHL, netting a 2.46 GAA and .914 save percentage, both top-5 league marks. Birdsall is described as a hard working and athletic goalie.
- Jeremy Bracco, F – Bracco finished on a record note with the US-NTDP last season, setting the team's record for both assists in a season (64) and career (122). He also finished third on the team's career point scoring list with 168, third only to Phil Kessel (180) and Patrick Kane (172). While playing for the United States at the 2015 U18 World Juniors, Bracco assisted on fellow recruit Colin White's overtime winning goal in the championship match, winning gold over Finland. Bracco is described as having superb passing and skating skills, as well as elite vision. Jeremy was drafted 61st overall by the Toronto Maple Leafs in the 2015 Draft.
- Chris Brown, F – Younger brother of former Eagle Patrick Brown, son of former Eagle Doug Brown and nephew of Associate Head Coach Greg Brown, Chris joins the Eagles having most recently played with the Tri-City Storm of the USHL. He is characterized as a passionate, hard-working, two-way forward and was drafted 151st Overall by the Buffalo Sabres in the 2014 Draft.
- Josh Couturier, D – A local out of Newburyport, MA, Josh is one of two defenseman recruited for the Eagles this season. Couturier last played with the Boston Junior Bruins in the USPHL. A large 6’ 2” body, Couturier adds size, solid defense and a strong shot to the Eagle's D-core.
- Joey Dudek, F – Most recently having played with the Chicago Steel of the United States Hockey League, Dudek, who played alongside fellow recruit Chris Shero at Kimball Union Academy, is described as a creative, crafty goal scorer. He was drafted 152nd Overall by the New Jersey Devils in the 2014 Draft. His father is Joe Dudek, who is famous in NCAA football for breaking Walter Payton’s record for career touchdowns in 1985.
- Casey Fitzgerald, D – Younger brother of junior Eagle forward Ryan Fitzgerald, Casey joins the Eagles as the other defenseman recruit for the season. Having last played on the US National Development Team, he is described as having great vision and elite hockey-IQ. His and Ryan’s father Tom, is currently the assistant General manager of the Pittsburgh Penguins.
- Chris Shero, F – Played for the South Shore Kings of the USHL in 2014–15, and played in previous years with fellow recruit Joey Dudek at Kimball Union Academy. Shero is tenacious player with high intelligence and character. Chris's father Ray is an NHL executive, currently serving as the general manager of the New Jersey Devils and former GM of the Pittsburgh Penguins.
- Colin White, F – White arrives at Boston College an American hero after scoring the overtime-winning goal over Finland at the 2015 U18 World Juniors, skating alongside fellow recruit Jeremy Bracco for the United States. Colin previously skated for the US National Development Team alongside fellow recruit Casey Fitzgerald. White, an assistant captain for numerous national teams he played for (U17/U18), is a natural leader and detail oriented. He was drafted 21st overall by the Ottawa Senators in the 2015 Draft and is a local native from Hanover, MA.
- Miles Wood, F – Wood rejoins fellow Eagles Thatcher Demko, Alex Tuch, Ian McCoshen, and Noah Hanifin after skating for the United States national junior team at the 2015 World Juniors. Miles, drafted 100th overall by the New Jersey Devils in the 2013 Draft, is described as a physical, gritty power-forward. His father Randy was a college hockey player for Yale and his older brother Tyler currently plays for Brown.
- Both White and Bracco won goal medals playing for the United States at the 2014 U-17 World championships and the 2015 U18 World Juniors.

Player	Position	Nationality	Notes
Chris Birdsall	Goalie	United States	Glen Rock, NJ; Played for the Youngstown Phantoms of the USHL.
Jeremy Bracco	Forward	United States	Freeport, NY; Selected 61st Overall by TOR in the 2015 Draft.
Chris Brown	Forward	United States	Bloomfield Hills, MI; Selected 151st Overall by BUF in the 2014 Draft.
Josh Couturier	Defenseman	United States	Newburyport, MA; Played for the Boston Junior Bruins of the USPHL.
Joey Dudek	Forward	United States	Auburn, NH; Selected 152nd Overall by NJD in the 2014 Draft.
Casey Fitzgerald	Forward	United States	North Reading, MA; Played for the US-NTDP of the USHL.
Chris Shero	Forward	United States	Upper St. Clair, PA; Played for the South Shore Kings of the USPHL.
Colin White	Forward	United States	Hanover, MA; Selected 21st Overall by OTT in the 2015 Draft.
Miles Wood	Forward	United States	Buffalo, NY; Selected 100th Overall by NJD in the 2013 Draft.

=== Midseason Additions ===
In addition to the nine players recruited at the start of the season, the Eagles added two early enrollees to the program who accelerated their arrival to the school. Defenseman Michael Kim and goalie Ian Milosz both played for the Boston Junior Bruins of the USPHL before arriving at Boston College for the second semester. Kim first dressed on December 29, 2015, and Milosz started in his first appearance on January 8, 2016, both games being against Providence College.

Charlie Van Kula was also added as an additional backup goaltender; he had been a team manager for the previous two seasons and had played at St. Joseph's Prep before attending Boston College.

Player	Position	Nationality	Notes
Michael Kim	Defenseman	Canada	Toronto, ON; Played for the Boston Junior Bruins of the USPHL.
Ian Milosz	Goalie	United States	North Grafton, MA; Played for the Boston Junior Bruins of the USPHL.
Charlie Van Kula	Goalie	United States	Radnor, PA; Team manager, played for St. Joseph's Prep (US-PA).

== 2015–2016 roster ==
=== Departures from 2014–2015 team ===
- Brad Barone – G – Graduation – Signed with the Elmira Jackals of the ECHL.
- Brian Billet – G – Graduation
- Noah Hanifin – D – Signed with the Carolina Hurricanes, forgoing rest of NCAA career.
- Danny Linell – F – Graduation
- Mike Matheson – D – Signed with the Florida Panthers, forgoing senior season.
- Michael Sit – F – Graduation
- Quinn Smith – F – Graduation – Signed with the Idaho Steelheads of the ECHL.
- Cam Spiro – F – Graduation – Signed with the Gladsaxe Bears in the Danish Hockey League.
- Destry Straight – F – Graduation – Signed with the Rapid City Rush of the ECHL.

=== 2015–16 Eagles ===
As of January 9, 2016.

No.	Nat.	Player	Class	Pos	Height	Weight	DoB	Hometown	Previous team	NHL rights
1		Chris Birdsall	Freshman	G	5' 11" (1.8 m)	175 lb (79 kg)	1996-11-24	Glen Rock, New Jersey	Youngstown (USHL)	—
2		Scott Savage	Junior	D	6' 1" (1.85 m)	185 lb (84 kg)	1995-04-11	San Clemente, California	US NTDP (USHL)	—
3		Ian McCoshen (A)	Junior	D	6' 3" (1.91 m)	206 lb (93 kg)	1995-08-05	Faribault, Minnesota	Waterloo (USHL)	FLA, 31st overall 2013
4		Teddy Doherty (C)	Senior	D	5' 9" (1.75 m)	178 lb (81 kg)	1994-04-25	Hopkinton, Massachusetts	Dubuque (USHL)	—
5		Casey Fitzgerald	Freshman	D	5' 10" (1.78 m)	186 lb (84 kg)	1997-02-25	North Reading, Massachusetts	US NTDP (USHL)	—
6		Steven Santini (A)	Junior	D	6' 2" (1.88 m)	201 lb (91 kg)	1995-03-07	Mahopac, New York	US NTDP (USHL)	NJD, 42nd overall 2013
8		Travis Jeke	Senior	D	6' 2" (1.88 m)	192 lb (87 kg)	1993-06-11	Pittsburgh, Pennsylvania	Northwood (USHS–NY)	—
9		Brendan Silk	Senior	F	6' 3" (1.91 m)	190 lb (86 kg)	1994-01-13	Wakefield, Massachusetts	US NTDP (USHL)	—
10		Chris Brown	Freshman	F	6' 0" (1.83 m)	174 lb (79 kg)	1996-02-22	Bloomfield Hills, Michigan	Tri-City (USHL)	BUF, 151st overall 2014
11		Chris Calnan (A)	Junior	F	6' 2" (1.88 m)	200 lb (91 kg)	1994-05-05	Norwell, Massachusetts	South Shore (EJHL)	CHI, 79th overall 2012
12		Alex Tuch	Sophomore	F	6' 3" (1.91 m)	218 lb (99 kg)	1996-05-10	Baldwinsville, New York	US NTDP (USHL)	MIN, 18th overall 2014
14		Adam Gilmour	Junior	F	6' 3" (1.91 m)	193 lb (88 kg)	1994-01-29	Hanover, Massachusetts	Muskegon (USHL)	MIN, 98th overall 2012
15		JD Dudek	Freshman	F	5' 11" (1.8 m)	182 lb (83 kg)	1996-01-29	Auburn, New Hampshire	Chicago (USHL)	NJD, 152nd overall 2014
17		Jeremy Bracco	Freshman	F	5' 10" (1.78 m)	173 lb (78 kg)	1997-03-17	Freeport, New York	US NTDP (USHL)	TOR, 61st overall 2015
18		Colin White	Freshman	F	6' 0" (1.83 m)	183 lb (83 kg)	1997-01-30	Hanover, Massachusetts	US NTDP (USHL)	OTT, 21st overall 2015
19		Ryan Fitzgerald	Junior	F	5' 9" (1.75 m)	166 lb (75 kg)	1994-10-19	North Reading, Massachusetts	Valley (EJHL)	BOS, 120th overall 2013
20		Peter McMullen	Senior	F	6' 1" (1.85 m)	209 lb (95 kg)	1993-02-19	Essex Fells, New Jersey	Delbarton (USHS–NJ)	—
21		Matthew Gaudreau	Junior	F	5' 9" (1.75 m)	135 lb (61 kg)	1994-12-05	Carneys Point, New Jersey	Omaha (USHL)	—
22		Josh Couturier	Freshman	D	6' 2" (1.88 m)	185 lb (84 kg)	1995-03-03	Newburyport, Massachusetts	Boston (USPHL)	—
23		Chris Shero	Freshman	F	5' 10" (1.78 m)	185 lb (84 kg)	1995-10-02	Upper St. Clair Township, Pennsylvania	South Shore (USPHL)	—
24		Zachary Sanford	Sophomore	F	6' 3" (1.91 m)	190 lb (86 kg)	1994-11-09	Auburn, New Hampshire	Middlesex (EJHL)	WSH, 61st overall 2013
26		Austin Cangelosi	Junior	F	5' 6" (1.68 m)	171 lb (78 kg)	1994-08-27	Estero, Florida	Youngstown (USHL)	—
27		Michael Kim	Freshman	D	6' 0" (1.83 m)	185 lb (84 kg)	1995-06-28	Toronto, Ontario	Boston (USPHL)	—
28		Miles Wood	Freshman	F	6' 1" (1.85 m)	160 lb (73 kg)	1995-09-30	Buffalo, New York	Nobles (USHS–MA)	NJD, 100th overall 2013
29		Ian Milosz	Freshman	G	6' 7" (2.01 m)	195 lb (88 kg)	1995-05-08	North Grafton, Massachusetts	Boston (USPHL)	—
30		Thatcher Demko	Junior	G	6' 3" (1.91 m)	192 lb (87 kg)	1995-12-08	San Diego, California	US NTDP (USHL)	VAN, 36th overall 2014
33		Charlie Van Kula	Freshman	G	5' 9" (1.75 m)	170 lb (77 kg)	1996-07-04	Radnor, Pennsylvania	St. Joseph's Prep (USHS–PA)	—
35		Alex Joyce	Junior	G	5' 10" (1.78 m)	165 lb (75 kg)	1995-01-01	Darien, Connecticut	Pomfret (USHS–CT)	—

=== Coaching staff ===
Name	Position	Seasons at Boston College	Alma mater
Jerry York	Head Coach	22	Boston College (1967)
Greg Brown	Associate Head Coach	12	Boston College (1990)
Mike Ayers	Assistant coach	3	University of New Hampshire (2004)
Marty McInnis	Assistant coach	3	Boston College (1992)

== Standings ==
2015–16 Hockey East men's standings
	Conference record							Overall record					
	GP	W	L	T	PTS	GF	GA	GP	W	L	T	GF	GA
#5 Boston College †	22	15	2	5	35	91	45	41	28	8	5	156	82
#3 Providence †	22	16	3	3	35	71	39	38	27	7	4	124	71
#13 Notre Dame	22	15	5	2	32	70	40	37	19	11	7	115	86
#8 Massachusetts–Lowell	22	12	6	4	28	58	37	40	25	10	5	121	75
#11 Boston University	22	12	6	4	28	75	56	36	21	10	5	124	106
#14 Northeastern *	22	10	8	4	24	75	56	41	22	14	5	134	105
Merrimack	22	5	10	7	17	50	70	39	13	19	7	95	108
Connecticut	22	6	12	4	16	49	70	36	11	21	4	88	114
Vermont	22	6	13	3	15	48	66	40	15	22	3	86	107
New Hampshire	22	4	12	6	14	57	73	37	11	20	6	112	121
Maine	22	5	15	2	12	42	77	38	8	24	6	76	129
Massachusetts	22	2	16	4	8	44	101	36	8	24	4	84	146
Championship: March 19, 2016 † indicates conference regular season champion; * indicates conference tournament champion Rankings: USCHO.com Top 20 Poll; updated March 8, 2016

== Schedule ==
=== Regular season ===
Date	Time	Opponent^{#}	Rank^{#}	Site	TV	Result	Attendance	Record
Exhibition
October 3	7:00 pm	New Brunswick*	#1	Kelley Rink • Chestnut Hill, Massachusetts		L 2–5	932	0–0–0
Regular season
October 9	7:05 pm	at Army*	#1	Tate Rink • West Point, New York		W 5–1	2,761	1–0–0
October 11	2:00 pm	at Rensselaer*	#1	Houston Field House • Troy, New York		L 1–2	2,770	1–1–0
October 16	7:00 pm	Wisconsin*	#4	Kelley Rink • Chestnut Hill, Massachusetts		W 6–0	5,615	2–1–0
October 23	9:37 pm	at Colorado*	#4	World Arena • Colorado Springs, Colorado		W 3–0	5,371	3–1–0
October 24	9:07 pm	at Colorado*	#4	World Arena • Colorado Springs, Colorado		W 5–0	7,044	4–1–0
October 30	7:00 pm	#5 Denver*	#4	Kelley Rink • Chestnut Hill, Massachusetts		W 4–3	5,019	5–1–0
November 3	7:00 pm	Massachusetts	#3	Kelley Rink • Chestnut Hill, Massachusetts		W 7–0	2,873	6–1–0 (1–0–0)
November 6	7:00 pm	Maine	#3	Kelley Rink • Chestnut Hill, Massachusetts		W 3–0	4,880	7–1–0 (2–0–0)
November 8	1:00 pm	Maine	#3	Kelley Rink • Chestnut Hill, Massachusetts		W 2–0	3,290	8–1–0 (3–0–0)
November 13	7:00 pm	Michigan State*	#2	Kelley Rink • Chestnut Hill, Massachusetts		W 6–4	5,437	9–1–0
November 21	7:00 pm	at New Hampshire	#2	Whittemore Center • Durham, New Hampshire	WBIN/FCS	W 6–3	6,269	10–1–0 (4–0–0)
November 24	7:05 pm	at Connecticut	#2	XL Center • Hartford, Connecticut		W 5–1	7,219	11–1–0 (5–0–0)
November 28	4:00 pm	RIT*	#2	Kelley Rink • Chestnut Hill, Massachusetts		W 6–2	5,208	12–1–0
December 5	7:00 pm	Northeastern	#2	Kelley Rink • Chestnut Hill, Massachusetts		T 3–3 ^{OT}	4,672	12–1–1 (5–0–1)
December 6	4:00 pm	at Northeastern	#2	Matthews Arena • Boston, Massachusetts		W 4–3	2,125	13–1–1 (6–0–1)
December 10	7:00 pm	#18 Notre Dame	#3	Kelley Rink • Chestnut Hill, Massachusetts (Holy War on Ice)		L 3–4	4,863	13–2–1 (6–1–1)
December 28	7:35 pm	vs. Ohio State*	#4	Germain Arena • Estero, Florida (Florida College Hockey Classic)		L 2–3	6,022	13–3–1
December 29	4:05 pm	vs. #1 Providence*	#4	Germain Arena • Estero, Florida (Florida College Hockey Classic)		L 1–2	5,752	13–4–1
January 8	7:00 pm	#3 Providence	#7	Kelley Rink • Chestnut Hill, Massachusetts		W 7–3	7,884	14–4–1 (7–1–1)
January 9	7:00 pm	at #3 Providence	#7	Schneider Arena • Providence, Rhode Island	WJAR/COX	T 4–4 ^{OT}	3,033	14–4–2 (7–1–2)
January 15	6:00 pm	#10 Boston University	#4	Kelley Rink • Chestnut Hill, Massachusetts (Green Line Rivalry)	ASN/NESN	W 5–3	7,884	15–4–2 (8–1–2)
January 16	7:00 pm	at #10 Boston University	#4	Agganis Arena • Boston, Massachusetts (Green Line Rivalry)		T 1–1 ^{OT}	6,032	15–4–3 (8–1–3)
January 22	7:00 pm	at Massachusetts	#4	Mullins Center • Amherst, Massachusetts		W 8–0	4,673	16–4–3 (9–1–3)
January 23	7:00 pm	Connecticut	#4	Kelley Rink • Chestnut Hill, Massachusetts		T 3–3 ^{OT}	6,063	16–4–4 (9–1–4)
January 29	7:35 pm	at #10 Notre Dame	#5	Compton Family Ice Arena • Notre Dame, Indiana (Holy War on Ice)	NBCSN	W 4–0	5,372	17–4–4 (10–1–4)
February 1	5:00 pm	vs. #7 Harvard*	#4	TD Garden • Boston, Massachusetts (Beanpot)	NESN	W 3–2	14,832	18–4–4
February 5	7:00 pm	New Hampshire	#4	Kelley Rink • Chestnut Hill, Massachusetts		W 4–3	5,043	19–4–4 (11–1–4)
February 8	8:00 pm	vs. #7 Boston University*	#3	TD Garden • Boston, Massachusetts (Beanpot, Green Line Rivalry)	NESN	W 1–0 ^{OT}	15,702	20–4–4
February 12	7:00 pm	Merrimack	#3	Kelley Rink • Chestnut Hill, Massachusetts		W 6–3	4,563	21–4–4 (12–1–4)
February 13	7:00 pm	at Merrimack	#3	Lawler Rink • North Andover, Massachusetts	WBIN/FCS/ESPN3	T 5–5 ^{OT}	2,549	21–4–5 (12–1–5)
February 19	7:05 pm	at Vermont	#2	Gutterson Fieldhouse • Burlington, Vermont		W 3–1	4,007	22–4–5 (13–1–5)
February 20	7:05 pm	at Vermont	#2	Gutterson Fieldhouse • Burlington, Vermont		W 4–1	4,007	23–4–5 (14–1–5)
February 26	7:00 pm	#11 UMass Lowell	#2	Kelley Rink • Chestnut Hill, Massachusetts		W 3–1	6,863	24–4–5 (15–1–5)
February 27	7:00 pm	at #11 UMass Lowell	#2	Tsongas Center • Lowell, Massachusetts	NESN	L 1–3	6,942	24–5–5 (15–2–5)
Hockey East Tournament
March 11	7:00pm	Vermont*	#3	Kelley Rink • Chestnut Hill, Massachusetts (Quarterfinals)		W 3–0	3,116	25–5–5
March 12	7:00pm	Vermont*	#3	Kelley Rink • Chestnut Hill, Massachusetts (Quarterfinals)		L 2–4	3,563	25–6–5
March 13	4:00pm	Vermont*	#3	Kelley Rink • Chestnut Hill, Massachusetts (Quarterfinals)		W 4–3 ^{OT}	2,537	26–6–5
March 18	8:00pm	#14 Northeastern*	#5	TD Garden • Boston, Massachusetts (Semifinals)	NESN/NBCSN	L 4–5	13,242	26–7–5
NCAA Tournament
March 25	8:00pm	#10 Harvard*	#6	DCU Center • Worcester, Massachusetts (Regional semifinal)	ESPNU	W 4–1	6,682	27–7–5
March 26	9:00pm	#14 Minnesota-Duluth*	#6	DCU Center • Worcester, Massachusetts (Regional final)	ESPNU	W 3–2	4,572	28–7–5
April 7	5:00pm	#1 Quinnipiac*	#6	Amalie Arena • Tampa, Florida (Frozen Four)	ESPN2	L 2–3	17,816	28–8–5
*Non-conference game. ^{#}Rankings from USCHO.com Poll. All times are in Eastern Time.

- On September 21, BC was ranked first in the Hockey East pre-season coaches poll, with 7 first place votes.
- On September 28, BC was ranked first in the NCAA pre-season USCHO poll, with 19 first place votes. They were also ranked first in the USA Today preseason poll, which was released on October 5.
- On October 28, it was announced that freshman Jeremy Bracco decided to leave the program after playing five games, joining the Kitchener Rangers of the OHL.
- With the win over New Hampshire on November 21, the Eagles tied the record for best start to a season for the program under Jerry York, going 10-1-0, matching the feat first accomplished in the 2012-13 season. With the win over Connecticut on November 24, the Eagles surpassed that record with an 11–1–0 start, the best season start under York, and third best in program history.
- On December 7, Colin White and Casey Fitzgerald were named to the preliminary roster for the US National Junior team which competed at the 2016 World Juniors in Helsinki, Finland. Notable omissions from the roster were Alex Tuch, who was a member of the 2015 team, and Jeremy Bracco. Casey Fitzgerald was also cut from the final roster, leaving White the only representative from Boston College.
- On December 29, with White playing in the World Juniors and Wood serving a one-game suspension as a result of a game misconduct received on December 28, BC added early enrollee Michael Kim to the roster to fill the gap on the defensive line.
- On January 8, with both Demko and Birdsall recovering from injuries, the Eagles added a second early enrollee to the squad, goalie Ian Milosz, who started in his first career game.
- On January 22, Jerry York earned his 1,000th career win as a head coach with an 8–0 victory over UMass.
- On January 29, goalie Thatcher Demko earned his eighth shutout of the season with a 4–0 victory over Notre Dame, tying the school record for most shutouts in a season set by Cory Schneider.
- On February 1, the Eagles defeated Harvard in the first round of the Beanpot, winning 3–2. Goalie Charlie Van Kula dressed as backup goaltender as Ian Milosz was declared out due to injury.
- On February 8, the Eagles won their 20th Beanpot championship in school history, defeating BU 1–0 in overtime. It was the 22nd matchup against the rival Terriers in the Beanpot championship, and the Eagle's 10th victory in said matchup. The 1–0 result was the first time this was achieved in the Beanpot title game, by any combination of teams. It was also the sixth title game in the last eleven to go to overtime, and BC's sixth championship in seven years. Thatcher Demko also broke Cory Schneider's team single-season shutout record with his ninth shutout of the season.
- On February 26, the Eagles defeated UMass Lowell 3–1 to secure the first overall seed in the Hockey East Tournament, as well as clinching at least a share of the Hockey East Regular season title, for best record in the conference. Additionally, Thatcher Demko was announced as a nominee for the Mike Richter Award as the nation's best goaltender.
- With the loss to UMass Lowell on February 27 along with Providence's victory over Massachusetts, the Eagles and Friars finished the season tied in league lead for points, sharing the title for Hockey East regular season champions.
- On March 13, the Eagles defeated Vermont in the Quarterfinals of the Hockey East playoffs, advancing to the semifinals for the first time since the 2012–13 season. They succeeded over the Catamounts in the best-of-three series in a rematch of the previous year's Quarterfinals.
- On March 18, the Eagles were defeated by Northeastern in the Hockey East Tournament semifinals, 5–4. The Huskies would eventually win the championship with a 3–2 victory over UMass Lowell.
- On March 27, the Eagles advanced to an NCAA-record 25th Frozen Four, after defeating Harvard and Minnesota-Duluth at the Northeast Regional, by scores of 3–1 and 3–2, respectively.
- On April 7, the Eagles fell to Quinnipiac 2–3 in the Frozen Four, the last game for the four seniors on the team.
- On April 8, Thatcher Demko was awarded the Mike Richter Award as the nation's top goaltender. He finish in the top 3 for voting for the Hobey Baker Award, which went to Harvard's Jimmy Vesey. Additionally, Steve Santini and Miles Wood both signed with their drafted team, the New Jersey Devils, forgoing the rest of their college careers.
- On April 9, Teddy Doherty signed with the Missouri Mavericks of the ECHL.
- On April 11, Adam Gilmour signed with his drafted team, the Minnesota Wild.
- On April 13, Alex Tuch signed with his drafted team, the Minnesota Wild, becoming the fourth player this offseason to leave the program before graduation.
- On April 19, the Eagles announced captains for the 2016–17 season. Rising seniors Ian McCoshen and Chris Calnan will serve as co-captains, and rising seniors Ryan Fitzgerald and Austin Cangelosi will serve as alternate captains for the season.
- On April 20, Thatcher Demko signed with his drafted team, the Vancouver Canucks, the 5th early departure for the Eagles.
- On June 20, Ian McCoshen signed with his drafted team, the Florida Panthers, forgoing his senior season and becoming the 6th eagle to depart the program early this offseason. He also chose to relinquished his assumed captainship, leaving Chris Calnan to serve as the sole captain for the 16–17 season.

== Rankings ==
Poll	Week																								
Poll	Pre	1	2	3	4	5	6	7	8	9	10	11	12	13	14	15	16	17	18	19	20	21	22	23	Final
USCHO.com	1	4	4	4	3	2	2	2	2	3	4	7	4	4	5	4	3	2	2	3	3	5	6	—	3
USA Today	1	3	4	4	3	2	3	2	3	3	4	7	4	5	5	4	3	2	2	4	3	4	5	3	4

== Statistics ==
=== Skaters ===
No.	Player	POS	YR	GP	G	A	Pts	PIM	PP	SHG	GWG	+/-	SOG
1	Chris Birdsall	G	FR	0	0	0	0	0	0	0	0	E	0
2	Scott Savage	D	JR	41	1	17	18	12	0	0	0	+14	62
3	Ian McCoshen	D	JR	40	6	15	21	86	3	0	2	+30	72
4	Teddy Doherty	D	SR	40	13	13	26	12	6	1	2	+17	78
5	Casey Fitzgerald	D	FR	40	4	23	27	48	3	0	0	+27	52
6	Steven Santini	D	JR	41	1	18	19	46	0	0	1	+24	52
8	Travis Jeke	D	SR	37	2	1	3	6	0	0	0	-1	27
9	Brendan Silk	F	SR	1	0	0	0	0	0	0	0	E	0
10	Chris Brown	F	FR	41	2	9	11	8	0	0	0	+5	30
11	Chris Calnan	F	JR	29	3	8	11	16	0	0	1	E	28
12	Alex Tuch	F	SO	40	18	16	34	33	2	0	2	+23	118
14	Adam Gilmour	F	JR	41	12	14	26	16	1	0	4	+15	92
15	JD Dudek	F	FR	34	1	2	3	6	0	0	0	-6	15
17	Jeremy Bracco†	F	FR	5	0	3	3	4	0	0	0	+3	8
18	Colin White	F	FR	37	19	24	43	45	4	2	3	+24	132
19	Ryan Fitzgerald	F	JR	40	24	23	47	47	5	3	5	+24	162
20	Peter McMullen	F	SR	15	0	0	0	2	0	0	0	-2	1
21	Matt Gaudreau	F	JR	39	4	17	21	22	0	0	2	+10	58
22	Josh Couturier	D	FR	33	2	4	6	24	0	0	0	+14	27
23	Chris Shero	F	FR	1	0	0	0	0	0	0	0	E	0
24	Zachary Sanford	F	SO	41	13	26	39	44	6	2	1	+27	109
26	Austin Cangelosi	F	JR	41	20	17	37	12	3	2	4	+17	82
27	Michael Kim	D	FR	24	1	5	6	6	0	0	0	+1	31
28	Miles Wood	F	FR	37	10	25	35	76	3	1	1	+13	112
29	Ian Milosz	G	FR	2	0	0	0	0	0	0	0	+1	0
30	Thatcher Demko	G	JR	39	0	2	2	4	0	0	0	+57	0
33	Charlie Van Kula	G	FR	0	0	0	0	0	0	0	0	E	0
35	Alex Joyce	G	JR	0	0	0	0	0	0	0	0	E	0
	Bench							6					
	Team			41	156	282	438	584	36	11	28	+60	1347

† Only played 5 games before leaving the program

=== Goaltenders ===
No.	Player	YR	GS	GP	MIN	W	L	T	GA	GAA	SA	SV	SV%	SO
1	Chris Birdsall	FR	0	0	0	0	0	0	0	0.00	0	0	1.00	0
29	Ian Milosz	FR	2	2	124:30	1	0	1	7	3.37	69	62	0.899	0
30	Thatcher Demko	JR	39	39	2361:48	27	8	4	74	1.88	1141	1067	0.935	10
33	Charlie Van Kula	FR	0	0	0	0	0	0	0	0.00	0	0	1.00	0
35	Alex Joyce	JR	0	0	0	0	0	0	0	0.00	0	0	1.00	0
	Empty Net			16	10:26				1		1			
	Team		41	41	2496:44	28	8	5	82	1.97	1211	1129	0.932	10

== Awards and honors ==
Hobey Baker Award

- Thatcher Demko, G – Hobey Hat Trick (Top 3) Finalist

Mike Richter Award

- Thatcher Demko, G – Winner

AHCA Division I All-Americans

- Thatcher Demko, G – Second Team
- Ryan Fitzgerald, F – Second Team

Hockey East Awards

- Thatcher Demko, G – Co-Player of the Year
- Colin White, F – Rookie of the Year
- Steve Santini, D – Old Time Hockey Best Defensive Defenseman

Hockey East All Stars

- Thatcher Demko, G – All-First Team
- Ryan Fitzgerald, F – All-First Team
- Ian McCoshen, D – All-Second Team
- Colin White, F – All-Second Team, All-Rookie Team
- Casey Fitzgerald, D – All-Rookie Team
- Austin Cangelosi, F – Honorable Mention

NCAA Rookie of the Month

- Colin White, F – Month of November

Hockey East Goaltender of the Month

- Thatcher Demko, G – Month of October, Month of November

Hockey East Rookie of the Month

- Colin White, F – Month of November

NCAA Three Stars of the Week

- Thatcher Demko, G – First Star, Week of October 26, 2015, First Star, Week of November 9, 2015

Hockey East Player of the Week

- Thatcher Demko, G – Week of November 9, 2015, Week of April 11, 2016
- Teddy Doherty, D – Week of March 28, 2016

Hockey East Rookie of the Week

- Colin White, F – Week of October 19, 2015, Week of November 30, 2015, Week of January 11, 2016
- JD Dudek, F – Week of March 14, 2015
- Casey Fitzgerald, D – Week of March 28, 2016, Week of April 11, 2016

Hockey East Defensive Player of the Week

- Thatcher Demko, G – Week of October 26, 2015, Week of March 28, 2016
- Ian McCoshen, D – Week of April 11, 2016
