= 2015–16 NCAA Division I men's ice hockey rankings =

- NCAA tournament: 2016
- NCAA champion: North Dakota
- Preseason No. 1 (USA Today): Boston College
- Preseason No. 1 (USCHO): Boston College
- NCAA Division I men's ice hockey rankings

Two human polls made up the 2015–16 NCAA Division I men's ice hockey rankings, the USCHO.com/CBS College Sports poll and the USA Today/USA Hockey Magazine poll. As the 2015–16 season progressed, rankings were updated weekly.

== Legend ==
	Increase in ranking
	Decrease in ranking
	Not ranked previous week
Italics	Number of first place votes
(#-#)	Win–loss–tie record
т	Tied with team above or below also with this symbol

== USCHO ==
	Preseason Sep 28	Week 1 Oct 12	Week 2 Oct 19	Week 3 Oct 26	Week 4 Nov 2	Week 5 Nov 9	Week 6 Nov 16	Week 7 Nov 23	Week 8 Nov 30	Week 9 Dec 7	Week 10 Dec 14	Week 11 Jan 4	Week 12 Jan 11	Week 13 Jan 18	Week 14 Jan 25	Week 15 Feb 1	Week 16 Feb 8	Week 17 Feb 15	Week 18 Feb 22	Week 19 Feb 29	Week 20 Mar 7	Week 21 Mar 14	Week 22 Mar 21	Final Apr 11	
1.	Boston College (19)	North Dakota (1–0–1) (18)	North Dakota (2–0–2) (16)	North Dakota (4–0–2) (23)	North Dakota (6–0–2) (27)	Providence (6–0–1) (29)	Providence (6–0–3) (17)	Providence (8–0–3) (36)	Providence (9–0–3) (34)	Providence (11–0–3) (39)	Providence (12–0–3) (48)	North Dakota (18–2–2) (36)	North Dakota (18–2–2) (32)	Quinnipiac (19–1–3) (41)	Quinnipiac (19–1–5) (30)	Quinnipiac (20–1–5) (35)	Quinnipiac (21–1–6) (37)	Quinnipiac (22–2–6) (32)	Quinnipiac (23–2–7) (32)	Quinnipiac (25–2–7) (48)	Quinnipiac (25–2–7) (39)	North Dakota (30–5–3) (35)	Quinnipiac (29–3–7) (48)	North Dakota (34–6–4) (50)	1.
2.	Minnesota-Duluth (12)	Providence (1–0–1) (13)	Omaha (4–0–0) (15)	Omaha (6–0–0) (12)	Providence (6–0–1) (18)	Boston College (8–1–0) (17)	Boston College (9–1–0) (14)	Boston College (10–1–0) (9)	Boston College (12–1–0) (10)	Quinnipiac (15–0–2) (10)	North Dakota (16–2–2) (1)	Quinnipiac (17–1–3) (14)	Quinnipiac (19–1–3) (18)	North Dakota (19–3–2) (8)	North Dakota (20–3–3) (15)	North Dakota (22–3–3) (9)	North Dakota (22–3–3) (12)	Boston College (21–4–5) (14)	Boston College (23–4–5) (11)	North Dakota (26–5–3) (1)	North Dakota (28–5–3) (11)	Quinnipiac (27–3–7) (14)	St. Cloud State (31–8–1) (2)	Quinnipiac (32–4–7)	2.
3.	Boston University (6)	Omaha (2–0–0) (8)	Providence (2–0–1) (12)	Providence (4–0–1) (10)	Boston College (5–1–0) (4)	North Dakota (7–1–2) (1)	Quinnipiac (10–0–0) (12)	Quinnipiac (11–0–2) (5)	Quinnipiac (13–0–2) (6)	Boston College (13–1–1)	Quinnipiac (15–1–2) (1)	Providence (13–2–3)	Providence (13–3–4)	Providence (15–3–4) (1)	St. Cloud State (20–5–1) (4)	St. Cloud State (22–5–1) (5)	Boston College (19–4–4) (1)	St. Cloud State (23–6–1) (4)	St. Cloud State (25–6–1) (7)	Boston College (24–5–5) (1)	Boston College (24–5–5)	Providence (27–5–4) (1)	North Dakota (30–6–4)	Boston College (28–8–5)	3.
4.	North Dakota (1)	Boston College (1–1–0) (7)	Boston College (2–1–0) (4)	Boston College (4–1–0) (4)	UMass Lowell (4–1–2)	Quinnipiac (8–0–0) (3)	North Dakota (9–1–2) (7)	UMass Lowell (9–1–3)	North Dakota (12–2–2)	North Dakota (14–2–2) (1)	Boston College (13–2–1)	St. Cloud State (16–4–0)	Boston College (14–4–2)	Boston College (15–4–3)	Providence (16–4–4) (1)	Boston College (17–4–4) (1)	St. Cloud State (23–6–1)	North Dakota (22–5–3)	North Dakota (24–5–3)	Providence (25–5–4)	Providence (25–5–4)	St. Cloud State (29–8–1)	Providence (27–6–4)	Denver (25–10–6)	4.
5.	Denver	Denver (1–1–0)	Minnesota-Duluth (2–1–0) (1)	Denver (3–1–0)	Quinnipiac (6–0–0) (1)	UMass Lowell (6–1–2)	UMass Lowell (8–1–2)	North Dakota (10–2–2)	UMass Lowell (10–1–4)	Omaha (12–3–1)	St. Cloud State (14–4–0)	Harvard (8–1–3)	St. Cloud State (17–5–0)	St. Cloud State (18–5–1)	Boston College (16–4–4)	Michigan (16–3–4)	Providence (19–5–4)	Providence (21–5–4)	Providence (23–5–4)	St. Cloud State (25–8–1)	St. Cloud State (27–8–1)	Boston College (26–6–5)	Michigan (24–7–5)	St. Cloud State (31–9–1)	5.
6.	Minnesota State (1)	Boston University (0–1–0)	Denver (3–1–0)	Minnesota-Duluth (2–1–2)	Minnesota-Duluth (3–2–2)	Omaha (8–2–0)	Omaha (8–2–0)	Omaha (9–2–1)	Omaha (11–2–1)	St. Cloud State (12–4–0)	Omaha (12–3–1)	Omaha (14–3–1)	Michigan (13–3–3)	Michigan (14–3–4)	Michigan (14–3–4)	Providence (17–5–4)	Michigan (17–4–4)	Michigan (18–4–5)	Michigan (19–4–5)	Michigan (20–5–5)	Denver (21–8–5)	Denver (23–8–5)	Boston College (26–7–5)	Michigan (25–8–5)	6.
7.	Providence (6)	Minnesota-Duluth (0–1–0)	UMass Lowell (3–0–0) (1)	UMass Lowell (3–0–2)	Harvard (2–0–0)	Harvard (3–0–1)	St. Cloud State (8–2–0)	St. Cloud State (9–3–0)	St. Cloud State (11–3–0)	Harvard (6–1–3)	Harvard (6–1–3)	Boston College (13–4–1)	Harvard (8–3–3)	Omaha (15–6–1)	Harvard (11–4–3)	Harvard (12–4–3)	Boston University (16–7–4)	Notre Dame (18–5–7)	Yale (18–5–4)	Denver (19–8–5)	Yale (19–6–4)	Michigan (22–7–5)	Denver (23–9–6)	UMass Lowell (25–10–5) т	7.
8.	Harvard (1)	Harvard (0–0–0) (2)	Boston University (1–1–0)	Boston University (2–1–0)	Omaha (6–2–0)	Denver (5–3–0)	Harvard (4–1–1)	Harvard (4–1–1)	Harvard (6–1–1)	UMass Lowell (10–3–4)	UMass Lowell (10–3–4)	Michigan (11–3–3)	Cornell (11–2–2)	UMass Lowell (14–4–4)	UMass Lowell (15–5–4)	UMass Lowell (17–5–4)	Notre Dame (16–5–7)	Yale (16–5–4)	Denver (17–8–5)	Yale (19–6–4)	Boston University (21–10–5)	UMass Lowell (23–8–5)	UMass Lowell (24–9–5)	Providence (27–7–4) т	8.
9.	Minnesota (1)	UMass Lowell (1–0–0) (2)	Harvard (0–0–0)	Quinnipiac (6–0–0) (1)	Denver (3–3–0)	St. Cloud State (6–2–0)	Denver (6–3–1)	Denver (7–3–2)	Denver (7–3–2)	Michigan (8–2–3)	Cornell (8–1–2)	Cornell (9–2–2)	Omaha (14–5–1)	Harvard (9–4–3)	Boston University (13–7–4)	Boston University (14–7–4)	Harvard (13–6–3)	Boston University (17–9–4)	Boston University (18–9–5)	Boston University (19–10–5)	Michigan (20–7–5)	Harvard (18–9–4)	Northeastern (22–13–5)	Minnesota-Duluth (19–16–5)	9.
10.	Omaha	Bowling Green (2–0–0)	St. Cloud State (4–0–0) (1)	Michigan (3–0–1)	St. Cloud State (6–2–0)	Yale (3–0–1)	Boston University (5–3–2)	Yale (5–1–2)	Yale (5–2–2)	Cornell (8–1–2)	Michigan (9–3–3)	UMass Lowell (11–4–4)	Boston University (11–6–3)	Cornell (11–3–3)	Notre Dame (14–4–7)	Notre Dame (14–5–7)	Yale (14–5–4)	Denver (15–8–5)	Notre Dame (18–7–7)	Notre Dame (19–8–7)	Notre Dame (19–8–7)	Yale (19–8–4)	Harvard (19–10–4)	Harvard (19–11–4)	10.
11.	Miami (Ohio) (1)	Michigan (0–0–0)	Michigan (2–0–0)	Harvard (0–0–0)	Boston University (3–3–0)	Boston University (5–3–0)	Yale (4–1–1)	Boston University (6–4–2)	Boston University (7–4–3)	Denver (7–5–2)	Boston University (9–6–3)	Boston University (9–6–3)	UMass Lowell (12–4–4)	Boston University (11–7–4)	Yale (11–4–4)	Yale (12–5–4)	UMass Lowell (17–6–5)	UMass Lowell (18–7–5)	UMass Lowell (20–7–5)	UMass Lowell (21–8–5)	UMass Lowell (21–8–5)	Boston University (21–12–5)	Yale (19–8–4)	Yale (19–9–4)	11.
12.	Yale	St. Cloud State (2–0–0)	Bowling Green (3–1–1)	Bowling Green (3–1–1)	Yale (2–0–0)	Michigan (4–1–1)	Michigan (5–1–1)	Michigan (6–2–1)	Michigan (7–2–2)	Boston University (8–5–3)	Bowling Green (11–3–5)	Yale (6–4–2)	Yale (8–4–3)	Yale (10–4–3)	Omaha (15–8–1)	Omaha (16–9–1)	Omaha (16–9–1)	Omaha (18–9–1)	Harvard (15–8–4)	Harvard (16–9–4)	Harvard (16–9–4)	Michigan Tech (23–8–5)	Boston University (21–12–5)	Northeastern (22–14–5)	12.
13.	Michigan	Yale (0–0–0)	Yale (0–0–0)	Yale (0–0–0)	Michigan (4–1–1)	Minnesota-Duluth (3–4–2)	Merrimack (6–1–3)	Merrimack (6–1–4)	St. Lawrence (8–3–2)	St. Lawrence (9–4–2)	Yale (6–4–2)	St. Lawrence (10–5–2)	Notre Dame (10–4–7)	Notre Dame (12–4–7)	Denver (12–7–5)	Denver (13–8–5)	Denver (13–8–5)	Harvard (14–8–3)	Omaha (18–11–1)	Michigan Tech (19–8–5)	Michigan Tech (21–8–5)	Notre Dame (19–10–7)	Notre Dame (19–10–7)	Notre Dame (19–11–7)	13.
14.	UMass Lowell (2)	Minnesota State (0–2–0)	Quinnipiac (3–0–0)	St. Cloud State (4–2–0)	Bowling Green (4–2–1)	Merrimack (5–1–2)	St. Lawrence (7–3–1)	St. Lawrence (8–3–2)	Bowling Green (9–3–3)	Bowling Green (9–3–5)	Penn State (11–2–3)	Penn State (12–3–3)	Denver (9–7–4)	Penn State (15–4–3)	Cornell (11–5–3)	Rensselaer (14–8–6)	Michigan Tech (16–7–5)	Michigan Tech (16–7–5)	Michigan Tech (17–8–5)	Penn State (19–9–4)	Penn State (20–10–4)	Northeastern (20–13–5)	Minnesota-Duluth (18–15–5)	Boston University (21–13–5)	14.
15.	Michigan Tech	Minnesota (0–1–0)	Miami (Ohio) (2–1–1)	Miami (Ohio) (3–2–1)	St. Lawrence (5–2–1)	Bowling Green (4–2–3) т	Bowling Green (5–3–3)	Bowling Green (7–3–3)	Cornell (6–1–2)	Yale (5–4–2)	St. Lawrence (10–5–2)	Notre Dame (9–4–6)	Penn State (13–4–3)	Denver (10–7–5)	Penn State (16–5–3)	Michigan Tech (14–7–5)	Cornell (12–7–4)	Penn State (18–8–4)	Penn State (19–9–4)	Omaha (18–13–1)	Cornell (15–9–7)	Minnesota State (20–12–7)	Michigan Tech (23–9–5)	Ferris State (20–15–6)	15.
16.	Bowling Green	Michigan Tech (0–0–0)	Michigan Tech (1–1–0)	St. Lawrence (4–2–0)	Merrimack (3–1–2)	St. Lawrence (6–3–1) т	Notre Dame (5–2–3)	Cornell (6–1–1)	Merrimack (6–2–4)	Penn State (10–2–3)	Notre Dame (9–4–4)	Bowling Green (12–5–5)	Bowling Green (13–6–5)	Rensselaer (12–7–5)	Rensselaer (13–7–6)	Penn State (16–7–3)	Penn State (17–8–3)	Cornell (12–8–5)	Cornell (13–8–6)	Minnesota State (17–10–7)	Minnesota State (18–11–7)	Minnesota-Duluth (17–14–5)	Minnesota State (21–13–7)	Michigan Tech (23–9–5)	16.
17.	St. Cloud State	Quinnipiac (2–0–0)	St. Lawrence (3–1–0)	Merrimack (2–0–2)	Clarkson (5–1–0)	Miami (Ohio) (5–4–1)	Minnesota-Duluth (3–5–3)	Minnesota-Duluth (5–5–3)	Michigan Tech (9–4–1) т	Minnesota-Duluth (7–5–3)	Denver (7–7–2)	Denver (7–7–4)	Minnesota-Duluth (8–7–4)	Michigan Tech (13–7–4)	Michigan Tech (13–7–4)	Cornell (11–7–3)	Minnesota State (15–10–5)	Rensselaer (15–11–6)	Rensselaer (16–12–6)	Minnesota (17–14–0)	Omaha (18–15–1)	St. Lawrence (19–13–4)	St. Lawrence (19–14–4)	Minnesota State (21–13–7)	17.
18.	Quinnipiac	Miami (Ohio) (0–1–1)	Union (2–0–2)	Michigan Tech (2–2–0)	Notre Dame (3–1–2)	Notre Dame (4–2–2)	Cornell (5–1–0)	Notre Dame (5–3–4)	Minnesota Duluth (5–5–3) т	Notre Dame (8–4–4)	Minnesota State (10–6–4)	Minnesota State (10–6–4)	St. Lawrence (10–7–2)	Bowling Green (13–7–5)	Bowling Green (15–7–5)	Minnesota State (14–9–5)	Rensselaer (14–10–6)	St. Lawrence (16–11–3)	Minnesota State (15–10–7)	Cornell (13–9–7)	St. Lawrence (17–13–4)	Cornell (16–11–7)	Ferris State (19–14–6)	St. Lawrence (19–14–4)	18.
19.	St. Lawrence	St. Lawrence (2–0–0)	Merrimack (2–0–0) т	Clarkson (5–1–0)	Miami (Ohio) (3–4–1)	Clarkson (5–2–1)	Michigan Tech (6–4–0)	Michigan Tech (7–4–1)	Penn State (8–2–3)	Merrimack (6–4–4)	Minnesota-Duluth (7–7–3)	Minnesota-Duluth (7–7–3)	Minnesota State (11–7–4)	Minnesota-Duluth (8–8–5)	Minnesota State (13–8–5)	Bowling Green (15–8–6)	Bowling Green (16–9–6)	Minnesota State (15–10–7)	St. Lawrence (16–12–4)	St. Lawrence (17–13–4)	Minnesota (18–15–0)	Penn State (20–12–4)	Cornell (16–11–7)	Cornell (16–11–7)	19.
20.	Colgate	Vermont (1–0–0)	Minnesota (0–3–0) т	Minnesota (2–3–0)	Robert Morris (3–1–2)	Michigan Tech (5–3–0)	Clarkson (5–3–1)	Penn State (7–2–3)	Notre Dame (6–4–4)	Minnesota State (8–6–4)	Merrimack (6–4–5)	Rensselaer (11–7–3)	Rensselaer (11–7–4)	Minnesota State (11–8–5)	Minnesota (13–10–0)	Dartmouth (11–9–1)	Clarkson (15–10–3)	Clarkson (16–11–3)	Minnesota (16–13–0)	Robert Morris (21–9–4)	Minnesota-Duluth (15–14–5)	Minnesota (19–16–0)	Minnesota (20–17–0)	RIT (18–15–6)	20.
	Preseason Sep 28	Week 1 Oct 12	Week 2 Oct 19	Week 3 Oct 26	Week 4 Nov 2	Week 5 Nov 9	Week 6 Nov 16	Week 7 Nov 23	Week 8 Nov 30	Week 9 Dec 7	Week 10 Dec 14	Week 11 Jan 4	Week 12 Jan 11	Week 13 Jan 18	Week 14 Jan 25	Week 15 Feb 1	Week 16 Feb 8	Week 17 Feb 15	Week 18 Feb 22	Week 19 Feb 29	Week 20 Mar 7	Week 21 Mar 14	Week 22 Mar 21	Final Apr 11	
		Dropped: Colgate	Dropped: Vermont; Minnesota State	Dropped: Union	Dropped: Minnesota; Michigan Tech	Dropped: Robert Morris	Dropped: Miami (Ohio)	Dropped: Clarkson	None	Dropped: Michigan Tech	None	Dropped: Merrimack	None	Dropped: St. Lawrence	Dropped: Minnesota-Duluth	Dropped: Minnesota	Dropped: Dartmouth	Dropped: Bowling Green	Dropped: Clarkson	Dropped: Rensselaer	Dropped: Robert Morris	Dropped: Omaha	Dropped: Penn State	Dropped: Minnesota	

== USA Today ==
	Preseason Oct 5	Week 1 Oct 12	Week 2 Oct 19	Week 3 Oct 26	Week 4 Nov 2	Week 5 Nov 9	Week 6 Nov 16	Week 7 Nov 23	Week 8 Nov 30	Week 9 Dec 7	Week 10 Dec 14	Week 11 Jan 4	Week 12 Jan 11	Week 13 Jan 18	Week 14 Jan 25	Week 15 Feb 1	Week 16 Feb 8	Week 17 Feb 15	Week 18 Feb 22	Week 19 Feb 29	Week 20 Mar 7	Week 21 Mar 14	Week 22 Mar 21	Week 23 Mar 28	Final Apr 11	
1.	Boston College (18)	North Dakota (1–0–1) (16)	Omaha (4–0–0) (15)	Omaha (6–0–0) (16)	North Dakota (6–0–2) (21)	Providence (6–0–1) (18)	Providence (6–0–3) (12)	Providence (8–0–3) (18)	Providence (9–0–3) (21)	Providence (11–0–3) (20)	Providence (12–0–3) (34)	Quinnipiac (17–1–3) (17)	Quinnipiac (19–1–3) (21)	Quinnipiac (19–1–3) (30)	Quinnipiac (19–1–5) (28)	Quinnipiac (20–1–5) (28)	Quinnipiac (21–1–6) (30)	Quinnipiac (22–2–6) (25)	Quinnipiac (23–2–7) (25)	Quinnipiac (25–2–7) (34)	Quinnipiac (25–2–7) (29)	North Dakota (30–5–3) (17)	Quinnipiac (29–3–7) (34)	Quinnipiac (31–3–7) (22)	North Dakota (34–6–4) (34)	1.
2.	Boston University (5)	Providence (1–0–1) (7)	North Dakota (2–0–2) (8)	North Dakota (4–0–2) (12)	Providence (6–0–1) (11)	Boston College (8–0–1) (10)	Quinnipiac (10–0–0) (12)	Boston College (10–1–0) (6)	Quinnipiac (13–0–2) (11)	Quinnipiac (15–0–2) (14)	Quinnipiac (15–1–2)	North Dakota (18–2–2) (16)	North Dakota (18–2–2) (13)	North Dakota (19–3–2) (3)	North Dakota (20–3–3) (6)	North Dakota (22–3–3) (6)	North Dakota (22–3–3) (4)	Boston College (21–4–5) (9)	Boston College (23–4–5) (8)	North Dakota (26–5–3)	North Dakota (28–5–3) (5)	Quinnipiac (27–3–7) (17)	St. Cloud State (31–8–1)	North Dakota (32–6–4) (12)	Quinnipiac (32–4–7)	2.
3.	Minnesota-Duluth (7)	Boston College (1–1–0) (5)	Providence (2–0–1) (9)	Providence (4–0–1) (5)	Boston College (5–1–0)	Quinnipiac (8–0–0) (5)	Boston College (9–1–0) (7)	Quinnipiac (11–0–2) (10)	Boston College (12–1–0) (2)	Boston College (13–1–1)	North Dakota (16–2–2)	Providence (13–2–3)	Providence (13–3–4)	Providence (15–3–4) (1)	St. Cloud State (20–5–1)	St. Cloud State (22–5–1)	Boston College (19–4–4)	St. Cloud State (23–6–1)	St. Cloud State (25–6–1) (1)	Providence (25–5–4)	Boston College (24–5–5)	Providence (27–5–4)	North Dakota (30–6–4)	Boston College (28–7–5)	Denver (25–10–6)	3.
4.	North Dakota	Omaha (2–0–0) (1)	Boston College (2–1–0)	Boston College (4–1–0)	Quinnipiac (6–0–0) (2)	North Dakota (7–1–2) (1)	North Dakota (9–1–2) (3)	UMass Lowell (9–1–3)	North Dakota (12–2–2)	North Dakota (14–2–2)	Boston College (13–2–1)	Harvard (8–1–3) (1)	Boston College (14–4–2)	St. Cloud State (18–5–1)	Providence (16–4–4)	Boston College (17–4–4)	St. Cloud State (23–6–1)	North Dakota (22–5–3)	North Dakota (24–5–3)	Boston College (24–5–5)	Providence (25–5–4)	Boston College (26–6–5)	Providence (27–6–4)	Denver (25–9–6)	Boston College (28–8–5)	4.
5.	Harvard	Harvard (0–0–0) (3)	Minnesota-Duluth (2–1–0)	Denver (3–1–0)	UMass Lowell (4–1–2)	UMass Lowell (6–1–2)	UMass Lowell (8–1–2)	North Dakota (10–2–2)	UMass Lowell (10–1–4)	Omaha (12–3–1)	St. Cloud State (14–4–0)	St. Cloud State (16–4–0)	St. Cloud State (17–5–0)	Boston College (15–4–3)	Boston College (16–4–4)	Michigan (16–3–4)	Providence (19–5–4)	Providence (21–5–4)	Providence (23–5–4)	St. Cloud State (25–8–1)	St. Cloud State (27–8–1)	St. Cloud State (29–8–1)	Boston College (26–7–5)	Michigan (25–8–5)	St. Cloud State (31–9–1)	5.
6.	Denver	Boston University (0–1–0)	Denver (3–1–0)	Minnesota-Duluth (2–1–2)	Harvard (2–0–0)	Harvard (3–0–1)	Omaha (8–2–0)	Omaha (9–2–1)	Omaha (11–2–1)	St. Cloud State (12–4–0)	Omaha (12–3–1)	Omaha (14–3–1)	Michigan (13–3–3)	Michigan (14–3–4)	Michigan (14–3–4)	Providence (17–5–4)	Michigan (17–4–4)	Michigan (18–4–5)	Michigan (19–4–5)	Michigan (20–5–5)	Denver (21–8–5)	Denver (23–8–5)	Michigan (24–7–5)	St. Cloud State (31–9–5)	Michigan (25–8–5)	6.
7.	Providence (3)	Minnesota-Duluth (0–1–0) (1)	Boston University (1–1–0)	Boston University (2–1–0)	Minnesota-Duluth (3–2–2)	Omaha (8–2–0)	St. Cloud State (8–2–0)	St. Cloud (9–3–0)	St. Cloud State (11–3–0)	Harvard (6–1–3)	Harvard (6–1–3)	Boston College (13–4–1)	Cornell (11–2–2)	Omaha (15–6–1)	Harvard (11–4–3)	Harvard (12–4–3)	Boston University (16–7–4)	Notre Dame (18–5–7)	Yale (18–5–4)	Denver (19–8–5)	Yale (19–6–4)	Michigan (22–7–5)	Denver (23–9–6)	Providence (27–7–4)	Providence (27–7–4)	7.
8.	Minnesota (1)	Denver (0–1–0)	UMass Lowell (3–0–0) (1)	UMass Lowell (3–0–2)	Omaha (6–2–0)	Yale (3–0–1)	Harvard (4–1–1)	Harvard (4–1–1)	Harvard (6–1–1)	UMass Lowell (10–3–4)	UMass Lowell (10–3–4)	Michigan (11–3–3)	Harvard (8–3–3)	Harvard (9–4–3)	UMass Lowell (15–5–4)	UMass Lowell (17–5–4)	Notre Dame (16–5–7)	Yale (16–5–4)	Denver (17–8–5)	Yale (19–6–4)	Boston University (21–10–5)	UMass Lowell (23–8–5)	UMass Lowell (24–9–5)	UMass Lowell (25–10–5)	UMass Lowell (25–10–5)	8.
9.	Minnesota State	UMass Lowell (1–0–0) (1)	Harvard (0–0–0)	Quinnipiac (6–0–0) (1)	Yale (2–0–0)	St. Cloud State (6–2–0)	Denver (6–3–1)	Yale (5–1–2)	Denver (7–3–2)	Michigan (8–2–3)	Cornell (8–1–2)	Cornell (9–2–2)	Omaha (14–5–1)	UMass Lowell (14–4–4)	Notre Dame (14–4–7)	Boston University (14–7–4)	Harvard (13–6–3)	Boston University (17–9–4)	Boston University (18–9–5)	Boston University (19–10–5)	Michigan (20–7–5)	Harvard (18–9–4)	Harvard (19–10–4)	Harvard (19–11–4)	Harvard (19–11–4)	9.
10.	Miami (Ohio)	Bowling Green (2–0–0)	St. Cloud State (4–0–0) (1)	Michigan (3–0–1)	Boston University (3–3–0)	Denver (5–3–0)	Yale (4–1–1)	Denver (7–3–2)	Yale (5–2–2)	Cornell (8–1–2)	Michigan (9–3–3)	UMass Lowell (11–4–4)	Boston University (11–6–3)	Cornell (11–3–3)	Boston University (13–7–4)	Notre Dame (14–5–7)	Yale (14–5–4)	Denver (15–8–5)	Notre Dame (18–7–7)	Notre Dame (19–8–7)	Notre Dame (19–8–7)	Boston University (21–12–5)	Northeastern (22–13–5)	Minnesota-Duluth (19–16–5)	Yale (19–9–4)	10.
11.	Omaha	Michigan (0–0–0)	Michigan (2–0–0)	Harvard (0–0–0)	St. Cloud State (6–2–0)	Boston University (5–3–0)	Boston University (5–3–2)	Michigan (6–2–1)	Michigan (7–2–2)	Boston University (8–5–3)	Boston University (9–6–3)	Boston University (9–6–3)	UMass Lowell (12–4–4)	Boston University (11–7–4)	Omaha (15–8–1)	Yale (12–5–4)	UMass Lowell (17–6–5)	Omaha (18–9–1)	UMass Lowell (20–7–5)	UMass Lowell (21–8–5)	UMass Lowell (21–8–5)	Yale (19–8–4)	Boston University (21–12–5)	Yale (19–9–4)	Northeastern (22–14–5)	11.
12.	Yale	St. Cloud State (2–0–0)	Bowling Green (3–1–1)	Bowling Green (3–1–1)	Denver (3–3–0)	Michigan (4–1–1)	Michigan (5–1–1)	Boston University (6–4–2)	Boston University (7–4–3)	Denver (7–5–2)	Yale (6–4–2)	Yale (6–4–2)	Yale (8–4–3)	Yale (10–4–3)	Yale (11–4–4)	Omaha (16–9–1)	Omaha (16–9–1)	UMass Lowell (18–7–5)	Harvard (15–8–4)	Harvard (16–9–4)	Harvard (16–9–4)	Notre Dame (19–10–7)	Yale (19–8–4)	Northeastern (22–14–5)	Minnesota-Duluth (19–16–5)	12.
13.	Michigan	Minnesota (0–1–0)	Quinnipiac (3–0–0)	St. Cloud State (4–2–0)	Michigan (4–1–1)	Minnesota-Duluth (3–4–2)	Merrimack (6–1–3)	Merrimack (6–1–4)	St. Lawrence (8–3–2)	St. Lawrence (9–4–2)	Bowling Green (11–3–5)	St. Lawrence (10–5–2)	Notre Dame (10–4–7)	Notre Dame (12–4–7)	Cornell (11–5–3)	Denver (13–8–5)	Denver (13–8–5)	Harvard (14–8–3)	Omaha (18–11–1)	Michigan Tech (19–8–5)	Michigan Tech (21–8–5)	Michigan Tech (23–8–5)	Notre Dame (19–10–7)	Notre Dame (19–11–7)	Notre Dame (19–11–7)	13.
14.	UMass Lowell	Yale (0–0–0)	Miami (Ohio) (2–1–1)	Miami (Ohio) (3–2–1)	St. Lawrence (5–2–1)	Merrimack (5–1–2)	St. Lawrence (7–3–1)	St. Lawrence (8–3–2)	Cornell (6–1–2)	Bowling Green (9–3–5)	St. Lawrence (10–5–2)	Notre Dame (9–4–6)	Denver (9–7–4)	Penn State (15–4–3)	Denver (12–7–5)	Michigan Tech (14–7–5)	Michigan Tech (16–7–5)	Michigan Tech (16–7–5)	Michigan Tech (17–8–5)	Penn State (19–9–4)	Penn State (20–10–4)	Northeastern (20–13–5)	Minnesota-Duluth (18–15–5)	Ferris State (20–15–6)	Boston University (21–13–5)	14.
15.	Michigan Tech	Minnesota State (0–2–0)	Yale (0–0–0)	Yale (0–0–0)	Bowling Green (4–2–1)	St. Lawrence (6–3–1)	Notre Dame (5–2–3)	Cornell (6–1–1)	Bowling Green (9–3–3)	Yale (5–4–2)	Penn State (11–2–3)	Penn State (12–3–3)	Penn State (13–4–3)	Denver (10–7–5)	Penn State (16–5–3)	Rensselaer (14–8–6)	Cornell (12–7–4)	Penn State (18–8–4)	Penn State (19–9–4)	Omaha (18–13–1)	Minnesota-Duluth (15–14–5)	Minnesota-Duluth (17–14–5)	Michigan Tech (23–9–5)	Boston University (21–13–5)	Ferris State (20–15–6)	15.
	Preseason Oct 5	Week 1 Oct 12	Week 2 Oct 19	Week 3 Oct 26	Week 4 Nov 2	Week 5 Nov 9	Week 6 Nov 16	Week 7 Nov 23	Week 8 Nov 30	Week 9 Dec 7	Week 10 Dec 14	Week 11 Jan 4	Week 12 Jan 11	Week 13 Jan 18	Week 14 Jan 25	Week 15 Feb 1	Week 16 Feb 8	Week 17 Feb 15	Week 18 Feb 22	Week 19 Feb 29	Week 20 Mar 7	Week 21 Mar 14	Week 22 Mar 21	Week 23 Mar 28	Final Apr 11	
		Dropped: Michigan Tech; Miami (Ohio)	Dropped: Minnesota; Minnesota State	None	Dropped: Miami (Ohio)	Dropped: Bowling Green	Dropped: Minnesota-Duluth	Dropped: Notre Dame	Dropped: Merrimack	None	Dropped: Denver	Dropped: Bowling Green	Dropped: St. Lawrence	None	None	Dropped: Penn State; Cornell	Dropped: Rensselaer	Dropped: Cornell	None	None	Dropped: Omaha	Dropped: Penn State	None	Dropped: Michigan Tech	None	
