= 2021–22 Seattle Kraken season =

National Hockey League season

2021–22 Seattle Kraken
- Division: 8th Pacific
- Conference: 15th Western
- 2021–22 record: 27–49–6
- Home record: 16–22–3
- Road record: 11–27–3
- Goals for: 216
- Goals against: 285

Team information
- General manager: Ron Francis
- Coach: Dave Hakstol
- Captain: Mark Giordano (Oct. – Mar.); Vacant (Mar. – May)
- Alternate captains: Jordan Eberle; Yanni Gourde; Adam Larsson; Jaden Schwartz
- Arena: Climate Pledge Arena
- Average attendance: 17,151
- Minor league affiliates: Charlotte Checkers (AHL); Allen Americans (ECHL)

Team leaders
- Goals: Jared McCann (27)
- Assists: Vince Dunn (28)
- Points: Jared McCann (50)
- Penalty minutes: Jeremy Lauzon (67)
- Plus/minus: Carson Soucy (+7)
- Wins: Philipp Grubauer (18)
- Goals against average: Chris Driedger (2.96)

The 2021–22 Seattle Kraken season was the inaugural season for the National Hockey League (NHL) franchise. They played their home games at Climate Pledge Arena.

The Kraken played their first regular season game on October 12, 2021, against the Vegas Golden Knights, a 4–3 loss. In their second game just two days later, the Kraken earned their first win in franchise history, defeating the Nashville Predators 4–3. The Kraken played their first home game on October 23, against the Vancouver Canucks, a 4–2 loss. The franchise recorded its first ever shutout on February 2, 2022, with Philipp Grubauer making 19 saves against the New York Islanders 3–0 at home. On March 30, the Kraken were eliminated from playoff contention after a 3–0 loss to the Golden Knights. The Kraken finished last in the Pacific Division with 60 points, the second-worst in the Western Conference ahead of the Arizona Coyotes.

== Background ==
=== Establishment ===
On December 4, 2017, the Seattle City Council voted 7–1 to approve a memorandum of understanding between the city of Seattle and the Los Angeles-based Oak View Group, co-founded by Tim Leiweke, for renovations of KeyArena. Renovations for the arena began in 2018 and were completed in 2021. The original roof remains in place, as it is considered a local historical landmark. Three days later, the NHL Board of Governors agreed to consider an expansion application from Seattle, with an expansion fee set at US$650 million. The Seattle ownership group was represented by David Bonderman and Jerry Bruckheimer, who conducted a preliminary season ticket drive to gauge interest in Seattle.

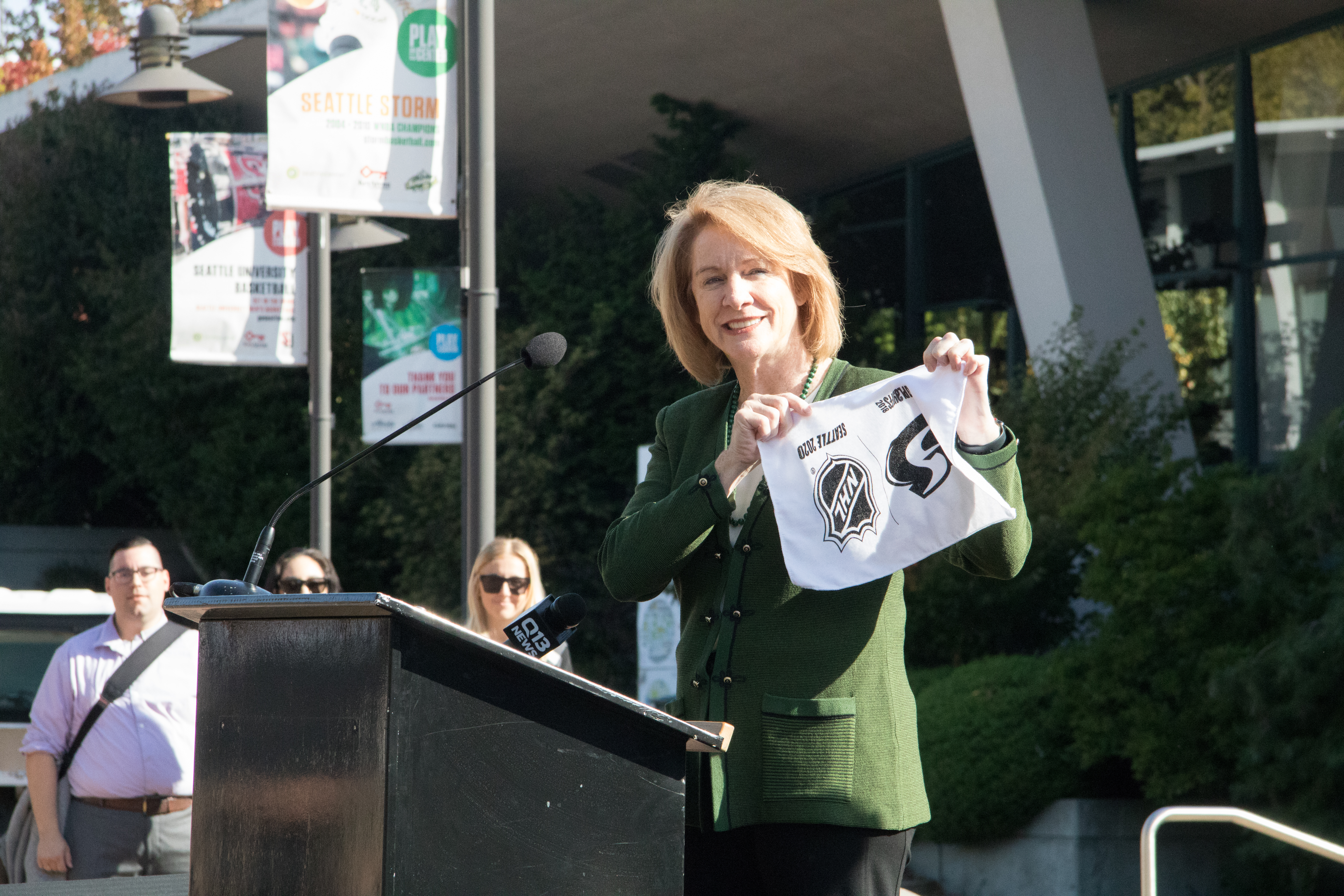
Seattle mayor Jenny Durkan celebrating the city's expansion team in September 2018

On February 13, 2018, the Oak View Group filed an application with the NHL for an expansion team and paid a $10 million application fee. At the time, the earliest a Seattle NHL team could have begun playing was the 2020–21 season pending the completion of arena renovations. A few weeks later, a ticket drive began to gauge interests in season ticket deposits. Oak View Group reported that their initial goal of 10,000 deposits was surpassed in 12 minutes, and that they received 25,000 deposits in 75 minutes. On April 11, Tod Leiweke was named chief executive officer (CEO) of Seattle's NHL expansion team. On October 2, another step towards an expansion team was taken when the NHL Executive Committee unanimously agreed to recommend the expansion bid to a vote of the Board of Governors in December. On December 4, the NHL Board of Governors voted unanimously to approve the addition of Seattle's expansion team into the league.

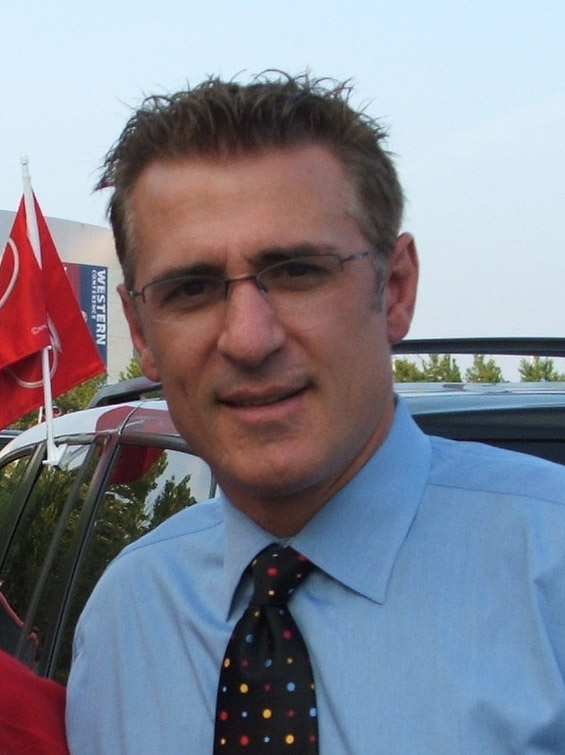
Ron Francis was hired in 2019 to be the Seattle Kraken's inaugural general manager.

In May 2019, The team launched an interactive "fan portal" where fans could propose a name and uniform colors for the team, answer poll questions, get information about ticket pricing and seating, and view a timeline of past and future key events involving the club. Two months later, the organization hired Ron Francis to serve as their general manager to initiate operations for the team. That same day, Tod Leiweke stated that hiring Francis was "perhaps the most important hire we [the Seattle NHL team] will ever make." This is because Francis would oversee all of the club's hockey operations, including facets like player personnel, coaching staff, scouting, and minor league operations. Francis later stated that three things he wanted to prioritize in the Kraken's roster were speed, character, and competitiveness.

In July 2020, the franchise announced their team name—the Seattle Kraken—as well as their team colors, branding, and home jersey. The franchise's promotional materials state that the name was adopted to honor the maritime culture of Seattle.

On January 26, 2021, the Kraken signed a multi-year deal with Root Sports Northwest to televise their games. The Kraken also added play-by-play announcer John Forslund to their broadcast team. In March, the Kraken and Climate Pledge Arena (formerly KeyArena) signed a deal with iHeartRadio for the purpose of having Sports Radio 93.3 KJR serve as the team's flagship radio station. On April 30, the franchise paid the final installment of the US$650 million expansion fee, officially making the Seattle Kraken the 32nd team of the NHL.

=== Building the team ===
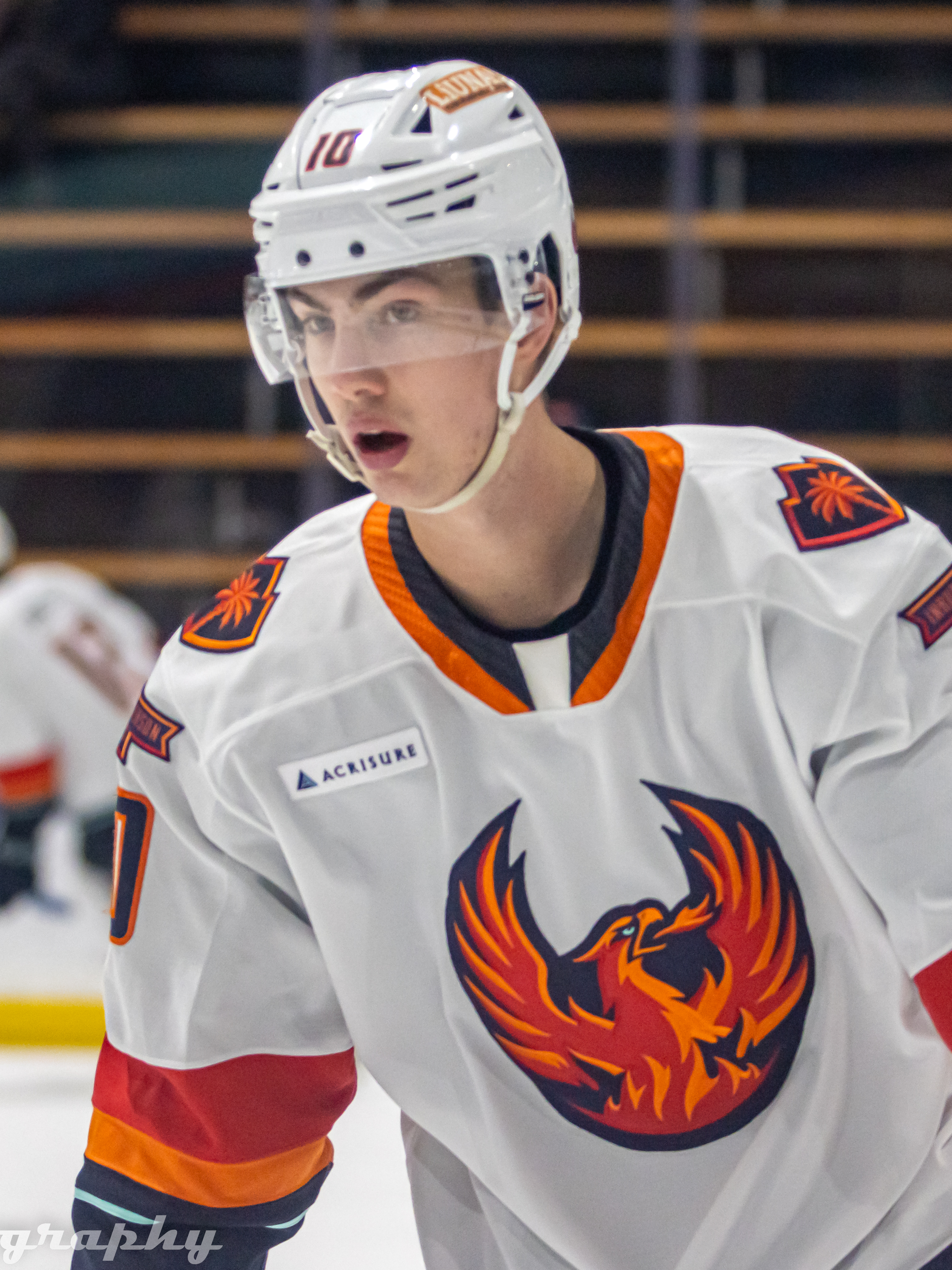
Luke Henman became the first player to join the Kraken after signing a contract with the team on May 12, 2021.

On May 12, the Kraken signed their first player—Luke Henman—to a three-year, entry-level contract. Henman stated that he was "super excited and honored" to join the team. At the time, Henman was the captain and leading scorer of the Quebec Major Junior Hockey League (QMJHL)'s Blainville-Boisbriand Armada. On June 21, the Kraken announced that J. T. Brown would join the team's television broadcasts as a color analyst. Three days later, the Kraken named Dave Hakstol as their inaugural head coach. "Dave possesses great experience, a strong work ethic, a solid technical understanding of the game, and the remarkable ability to communicate clearly and effectively. I look forward to working with Dave as we strive to build a team our fans will be proud of," Ron Francis stated about Hakstol. Four days after, the Kraken announced that the Charlotte Checkers would be their inaugural American Hockey League (AHL) affiliate, sharing the team with the Florida Panthers. Two days later, the Kraken partnered with Seattle-based company Starbucks to announce the creation of the Kraken Community Iceplex, the team's new training facility, at the Northgate Station shopping mall.

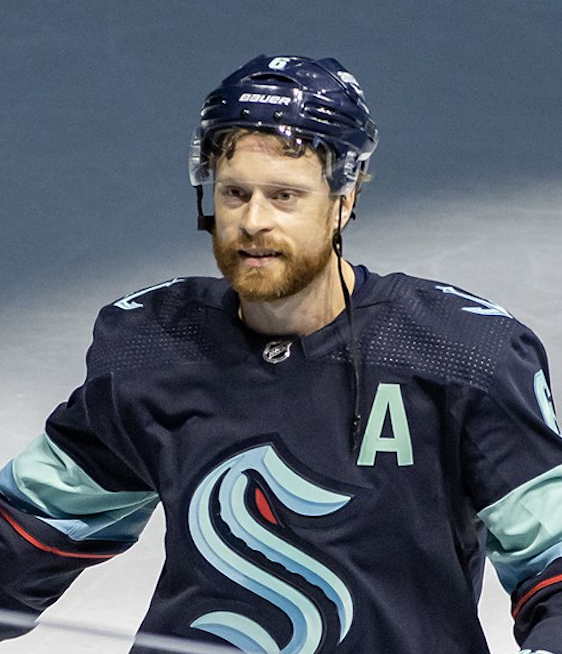
Adam Larsson

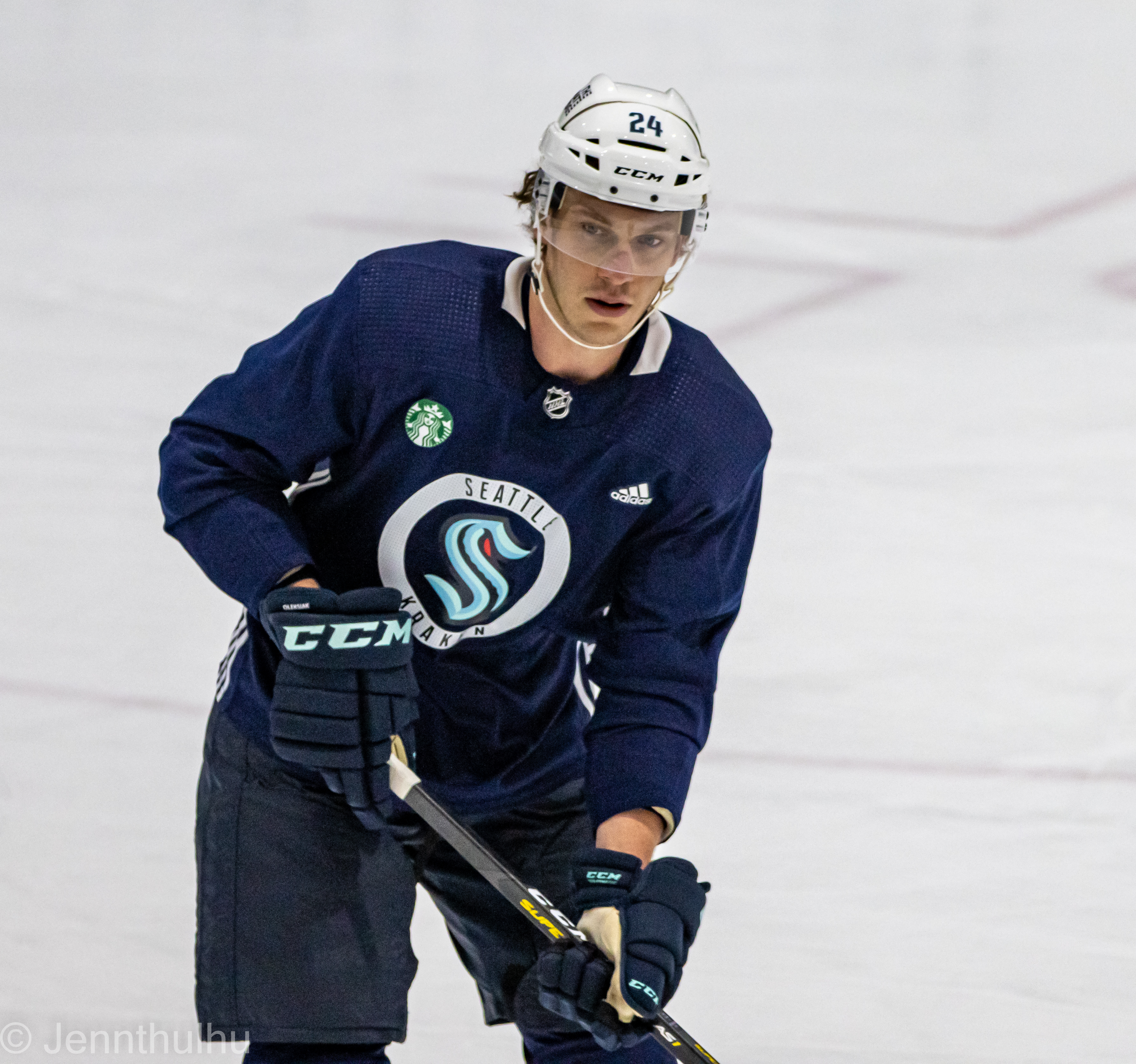
Jamie Oleksiak

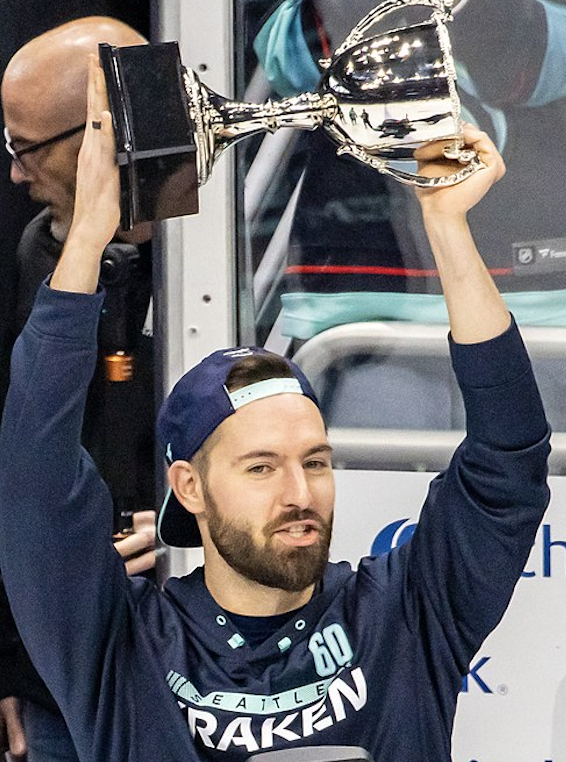
Chris Driedger

Adam Larsson, Jamie Oleksiak, and Chris Driedger signed contracts with the Kraken before they were selected by the team during the 2021 NHL expansion draft.

On July 6, the Kraken added Paul McFarland and Jay Leach to Hakstol's coaching staff. On July 18, the protected player list for the 2021 NHL expansion draft, a list of players who the Kraken were not allowed to select during the draft, was released. The next day, a three-day period where the Seattle Kraken could talk to unrestricted free agents (UFAs) begun. On the morning of July 21, the Kraken signed defensemen Adam Larsson and Jamie Oleksiak and goaltender Chris Driedger to a four-year $16 million deal, a five-year $23 million contract, and a three-year $10.5 million deal, respectively. Later in the day, the 2021 NHL expansion draft began at Gas Works Park in front of more than 4,000 spectators and fans. The draft used the same rules as the 2017 NHL expansion draft did for the Vegas Golden Knights. The Kraken had to select or sign one player from each existing team except for Vegas. Larsson, Oleksiak, and Driedger counted as the pick from their respective teams (Edmonton, Dallas, and Florida, respectively). The Kraken's selections are listed below:

Key: Left wing = LW, Center = C, Right wing = RW, Defenseman = D, Goaltender = G

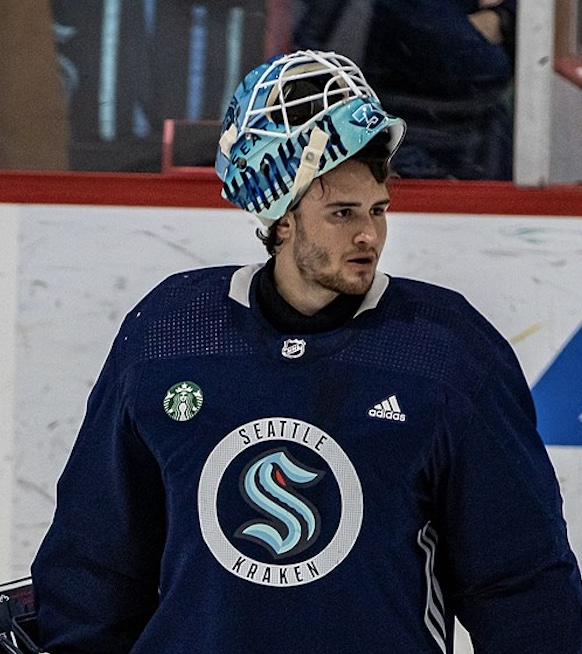
Goaltender Joey Daccord

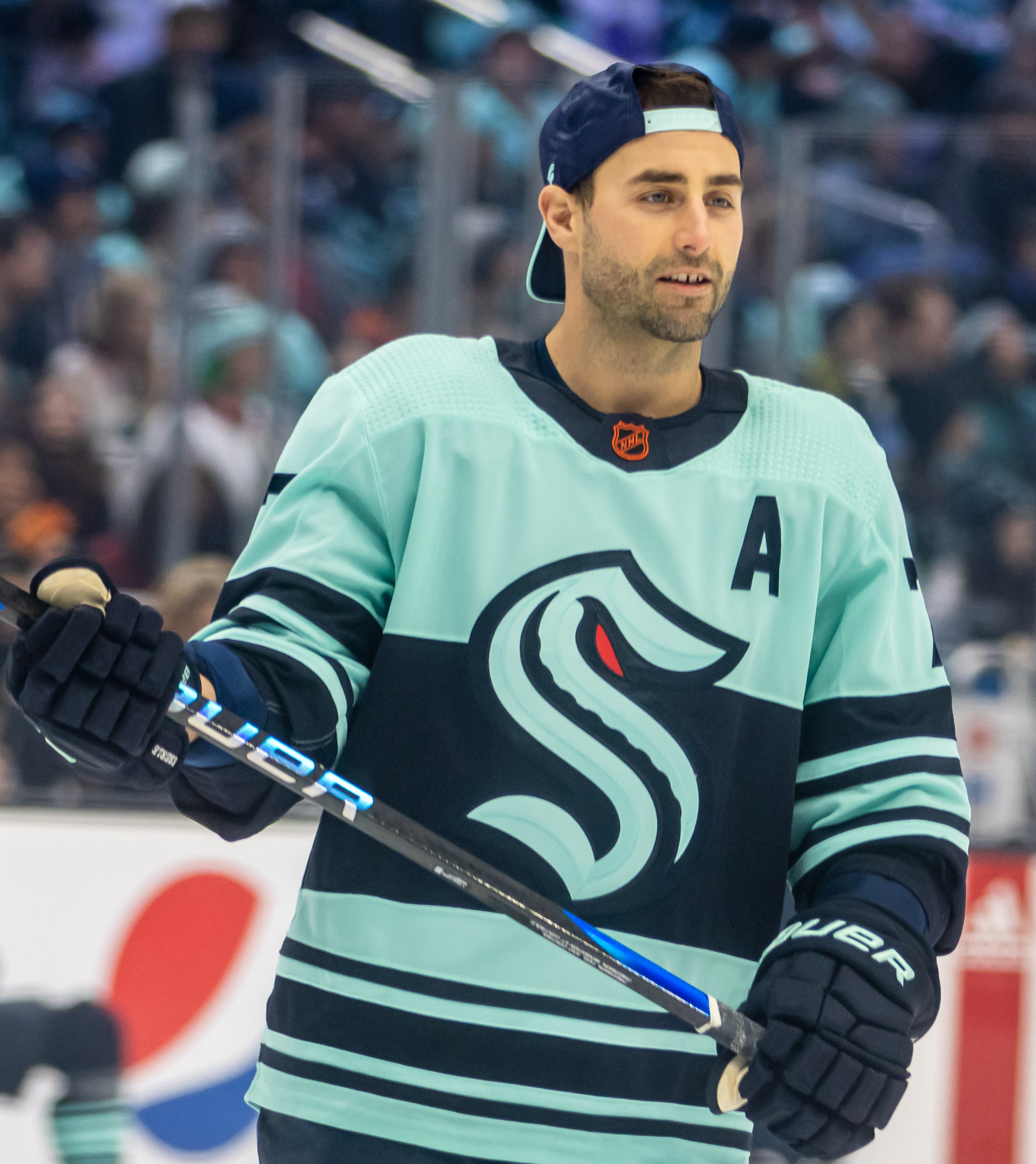
Right wing Jordan Eberle

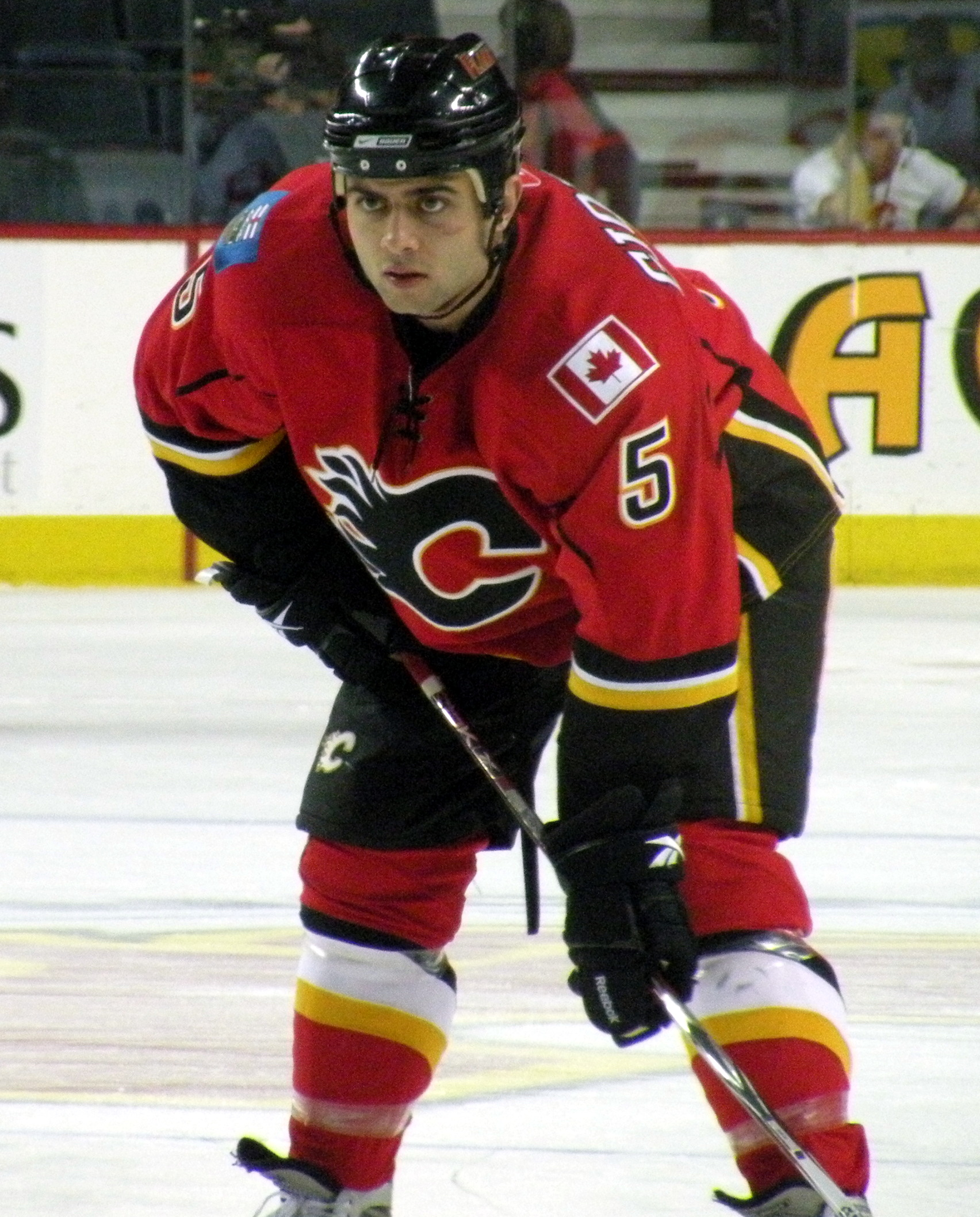
Defenseman Mark Giordano

Number	Player	Position	Team drafted from
1	Jeremy Lauzon	D	Boston Bruins
2	Will Borgen	D	Buffalo Sabres
3	Dennis Cholowski	D	Detroit Red Wings
4	Chris Driedger	G	Florida Panthers
5	Cale Fleury	D	Montreal Canadiens
6	Joey Daccord	G	Ottawa Senators
7	Yanni Gourde	C/LW	Tampa Bay Lightning
8	Jared McCann	LW/C	Toronto Maple Leafs
9	Morgan Geekie	RW/C	Carolina Hurricanes
10	Gavin Bayreuther	D	Columbus Blue Jackets
11	Nathan Bastian	RW	New Jersey Devils
12	Jordan Eberle	RW	New York Islanders
13	Colin Blackwell	C	New York Rangers
14	Carsen Twarynski	LW	Philadelphia Flyers
15	Brandon Tanev	LW	Pittsburgh Penguins
16	Vitek Vanecek	G	Washington Capitals
17	Tyler Pitlick	C	Arizona Coyotes
18	John Quenneville	C	Chicago Blackhawks
19	Joonas Donskoi	RW	Colorado Avalanche
20	Jamie Oleksiak	D	Dallas Stars
21	Carson Soucy	D	Minnesota Wild
22	Calle Jarnkrok	RW	Nashville Predators
23	Vince Dunn	D	St. Louis Blues
24	Mason Appleton	C	Winnipeg Jets
25	Haydn Fleury	D	Anaheim Ducks
26	Mark Giordano	D	Calgary Flames
27	Adam Larsson	D	Edmonton Oilers
28	Kurtis MacDermid	D	Los Angeles Kings
29	Alexander True	C	San Jose Sharks
30	Kole Lind	RW	Vancouver Canucks

The next day, the Kraken made their first trade in team history, giving expansion draft pick Tyler Pitlick to the Calgary Flames in exchange for a fourth-round pick in the 2022 NHL entry draft.

The day after, the first round of the 2021 NHL entry draft took place. The Kraken used their second-overall pick to select Matty Beniers, a center from the University of Michigan. Beniers scored 24 points in 24 games during the previous season, and he led first-time draft-eligible NCAA players in goals, with 10. On the 24th, round 2–7 occurred.

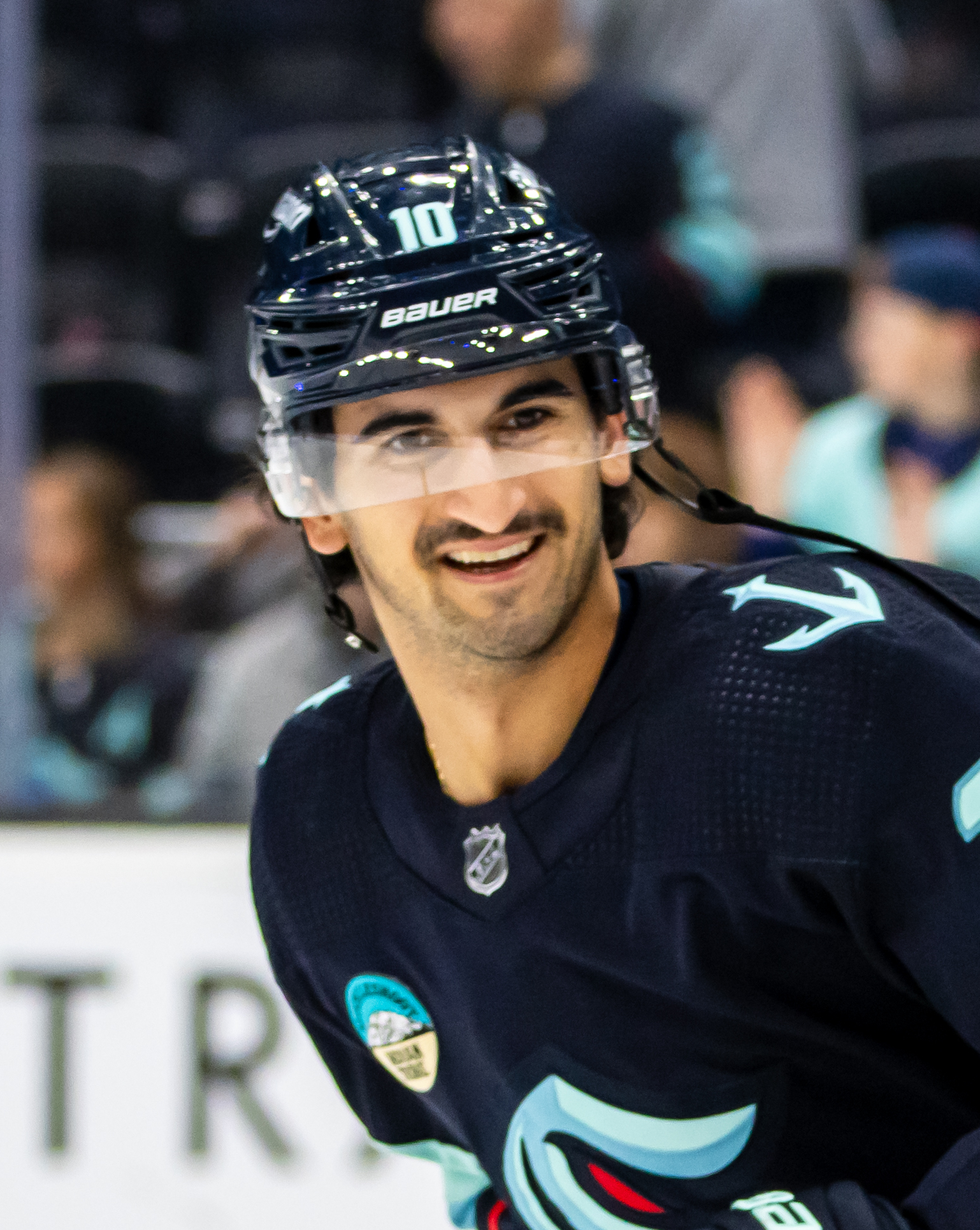
Matty Beniers was the Kraken's first entry draft pick, selected second overall in 2021.

Round	Number	Player	Position	Nationality	Team (League)
1	2	Matty Beniers	C	United States	University of Michigan (Big Ten)
2	35	Ryker Evans	D	Canada	Regina Pats (WHL)
3	67	Ryan Winterton	C	Canada	Hamilton Bulldogs (OHL)
4	99	Ville Ottavainen	D	Finland	JYP Jyväskylä (Liiga)
5	131	Jacob Melanson	RW	Canada	Acadie–Bathurst Titan (QMJHL)
6	163	Semyon Vyazovoy	G	Russia	Tolpar Ufa (MHL)
7	195	Justin Janicke	LW	United States	U.S. NTDP (USHL)

On July 27, the Kraken traded expansion draft pick Kurtis MacDermid to the Colorado Avalanche in exchange for a fourth-round pick in the 2023 NHL entry draft.

== Off-season ==
On the morning of July 28, the Kraken signed center Alexander Wennberg to a three-year, $13.5 million contract. Within the next hour, the Kraken would sign center/left wing Jaden Schwartz to a five-year, $27.5 million deal. and goaltender Philipp Grubauer to a six-year, $35.4 million contract. Grubauer had been considered one of the top names on the market prior to the beginning of free agency. In the afternoon, the Kraken traded expansion draft pick Vitek Vanecek to the team he was selected from, the Washington Capitals, in exchange for a second-round draft pick in 2023. Ron Francis stated that the team initially "took Vitek Vanecek to be part of our goalie tandem." He also said that he "didn't expect Grubauer to get to market [instead of re-signing with the Colorado Avalanche]" and that "six different teams called on Vitek."

== Regular season ==
The Kraken played their first regular season game on October 12, a 4–3 loss to the Vegas Golden Knights, where Ryan Donato scored the team's first goal. The Kraken's first win came in their second game on October 14, when they defeated the Nashville Predators 4–3. Following a 6–1 loss to the Philadelphia Flyers, goaltender Joey Daccord was named the starter instead of Grubauer in a 4–2 loss to the New Jersey Devils. The Kraken played their first home game at Climate Pledge Arena on October 23, a 4–2 loss to the Vancouver Canucks. Prior to the game, the Kraken retired jersey number 32, in recognition of the franchise being the 32nd to join the NHL and in honor of the 32,000 fans who placed deposits for tickets on the first possible day. The Kraken picked up their first home win on October 26, against the Montreal Canadiens. Goaltender Chris Driedger made his first start with the Kraken on November 9, in a 4–2 loss to the Golden Knights.

The Kraken had several losing streaks in their season. However, on February 2, 2022, Philipp Grubauer recorded the franchise's first shutout, making 19 saves in an 3–0 victory against the New York Islanders. On March 20, the Kraken's captaincy became vacant after Giordano was traded to the Toronto Maple Leafs. The Kraken were eliminated from playoff contention on March 30 following a 3–0 loss to the Golden Knights. The Kraken finished their inaugural season in last place of the Pacific Division with a 27–49–6 record and 60 points.

== Standings ==
=== Divisional standings ===
Pacific Division
Pos	Team	GP	W	L	OTL	RW	GF	GA	GD	Pts
1	y – Calgary Flames	82	50	21	11	44	293	208	+85	111
2	x – Edmonton Oilers	82	49	27	6	38	290	252	+38	104
3	x – Los Angeles Kings	82	44	27	11	35	239	236	+3	99
4	Vegas Golden Knights	82	43	31	8	34	266	248	+18	94
5	Vancouver Canucks	82	40	30	12	32	249	236	+13	92
6	San Jose Sharks	82	32	37	13	22	214	264	−50	77
7	Anaheim Ducks	82	31	37	14	22	232	271	−39	76
8	Seattle Kraken	82	27	49	6	23	216	285	−69	60

Source: National Hockey League
Rules for classification: 1) Fewer number of games played (GP, only during regular season); 2) Greater number of regulation wins (RW); 3) Greater number of wins in regulation and overtime, excluding shootout wins (ROW); 4) Greater number of total wins, including shootouts (W); 5) Greater number of points earned in head-to-head play; if teams played an uneven number of head-to-head games, the result of the first game on the home ice of the team with the extra home game is discarded; 6) Greater goal differential (GD); 7) Greater number of goals scored (GF)
x – Clinched playoff spot; y – Clinched division

=== Conference standings ===
Western Conference Wild Card
Pos	Div	Team	GP	W	L	OTL	RW	GF	GA	GD	Pts
1	CE	x – Dallas Stars	82	46	30	6	31	238	246	−8	98
2	CE	x – Nashville Predators	82	45	30	7	35	266	252	+14	97
3	PA	Vegas Golden Knights	82	43	31	8	34	266	248	+18	94
4	PA	Vancouver Canucks	82	40	30	12	32	249	236	+13	92
5	CE	Winnipeg Jets	82	39	32	11	32	252	257	−5	89
6	PA	San Jose Sharks	82	32	37	13	22	214	264	−50	77
7	PA	Anaheim Ducks	82	31	37	14	22	232	271	−39	76
8	CE	Chicago Blackhawks	82	28	42	12	16	219	291	−72	68
9	PA	Seattle Kraken	82	27	49	6	23	216	285	−69	60
10	CE	Arizona Coyotes	82	25	50	7	18	207	313	−106	57

Source: National Hockey League
Rules for classification: 1) Fewer number of games played (GP, only during regular season); 2) Greater number of regulation wins (RW); 3) Greater number of wins in regulation and overtime, excluding shootout wins (ROW); 4) Greater number of total wins, including shootouts (W); 5) Greater number of points earned in head-to-head play; if teams played an uneven number of head-to-head games, the result of the first game on the home ice of the team with the extra home game is discarded; 6) Greater goal differential (GD); 7) Greater number of goals scored (GF)
x – Clinched playoff spot

== Schedule and results ==
=== Preseason ===
On July 9, 2021, the Kraken revealed their 2021–22 preseason schedule. With Climate Pledge Arena not scheduled to open until mid-October, the Kraken instead played their home preseason games at three different Western Hockey League (WHL) arenas in Washington, as part of an event called the 3-Rink Rush.

2021 preseason game log: 4–2–0 (home: 2–1–0; road: 2–1–0)
#	Date	Visitor	Score	Home	OT	Decision	Arena	Attendance	Record	Recap
1	September 26	Vancouver	3–5	Seattle		Driedger	Spokane Arena	10,208	1–0–0
2	September 28	Seattle	0–6	Edmonton		Driedger	Rogers Place	13,627	1–1–0
3	September 29	Seattle	4–3	Calgary	SO	Daccord	Scotiabank Saddledome	14,451	2–1–0
4	October 1	Edmonton	1–2	Seattle	OT	Daccord	Angel of the Winds Arena	—	3–1–0
5	October 2	Calgary	4–1	Seattle		Driedger	accesso ShoWare Center	—	3–2–0
6	October 5	Seattle	4–0	Vancouver		Grubauer	Rogers Arena	9,268	4–2–0

=== Regular season ===
The Kraken released their regular season schedule on July 22, 2021. Only a handful of games are scheduled in February as a result of NHL players planning to participate in the 2022 Winter Olympics. However, due to a rising number of postponed games because of COVID-19, the NHL decided not to send players to the event.

2021–22 game log

October: 3–5–1 (home: 2–2–0; road: 1–3–1)
#	Date	Visitor	Score	Home	OT	Decision	Attendance	Record	Pts	Recap
1	October 12	Seattle	3–4	Vegas		Grubauer	18,431	0–1–0	0
2	October 14	Seattle	4–3	Nashville		Grubauer	17,159	1–1–0	2
3	October 16	Seattle	1–2	Columbus	OT	Grubauer	17,593	1–1–1	3
4	October 18	Seattle	1–6	Philadelphia		Grubauer	17,727	1–2–1	3
5	October 19	Seattle	2–4	New Jersey		Daccord	13,806	1–3–1	3
6	October 23	Vancouver	4–2	Seattle		Grubauer	17,151	1–4–1	3
7	October 26	Montreal	1–5	Seattle		Grubauer	17,151	2–4–1	5
8	October 28	Minnesota	1–4	Seattle		Grubauer	17,151	3–4–1	7
9	October 31	NY Rangers	3–1	Seattle		Grubauer	17,151	3–5–1	7

November: 5–8–0 (home: 3–4–0; road: 2–4–0)
#	Date	Visitor	Score	Home	OT	Decision	Attendance	Record	Pts	Recap
10	November 1	Seattle	2–5	Edmonton		Daccord	15,860	3–6–1	7
11	November 4	Buffalo	2–5	Seattle		Grubauer	17,151	4–6–1	9
12	November 6	Seattle	4–5	Arizona		Grubauer	15,045	4–7–1	9
13	November 9	Seattle	2–4	Vegas		Driedger	18,246	4–8–1	9
14	November 11	Anaheim	7–4	Seattle		Grubauer	17,151	4–9–1	9
15	November 13	Minnesota	4–2	Seattle		Grubauer	17,151	4–10–1	9
16	November 17	Chicago	4–2	Seattle		Grubauer	17,151	4–11–1	9
17	November 19	Colorado	7–3	Seattle		Driedger	17,151	4–12–1	9
18	November 21	Washington	2–5	Seattle		Grubauer	17,151	5–12–1	11
19	November 24	Carolina	1–2	Seattle		Grubauer	17,151	6–12–1	13
20	November 26	Seattle	0–3	Tampa Bay		Grubauer	19,092	6–13–1	13
21	November 27	Seattle	4–1	Florida		Driedger	15,305	7–13–1	15
22	November 29	Seattle	7–4	Buffalo		Driedger	10,004	8–13–1	17

December: 2–5–3 (home: 1–4–2; road: 1–1–1)
#	Date	Visitor	Score	Home	OT	Decision	Attendance	Record	Pts	Recap
23	December 1	Seattle	3–4	Detroit	SO	Grubauer	18,963	8–13–2	18
24	December 3	Edmonton	3–4	Seattle		Grubauer	17,151	9–13–2	20
25	December 6	Pittsburgh	6–1	Seattle		Grubauer	17,151	9–14–2	20
26	December 9	Winnipeg	3–0	Seattle		Grubauer	17,151	9–15–2	20
27	December 11	Columbus	5–4	Seattle	OT	Grubauer	17,151	9–15–3	21
28	December 14	Seattle	3–1	San Jose		Driedger	12,403	10–15–3	23
29	December 15	Seattle	1–4	Anaheim		Grubauer	14,762	10–16–3	23
30	December 18	Edmonton	5–3	Seattle		Driedger	17,151	10–17–3	23
—	December 19	Toronto	–	Seattle	Postponed due to COVID-19. Rescheduled for February 14.
—	December 21	Arizona	–	Seattle	Postponed due to COVID-19. Rescheduled for February 9.
—	December 23	Seattle	–	Calgary	Postponed due to COVID-19. Rescheduled for February 19.
—	December 27	Seattle	–	Vancouver	Postponed due to COVID-19. Rescheduled for February 21.
31	December 29	Philadelphia	3–2	Seattle	OT	Grubauer	17,151	10–17–4	24
32	December 30	Calgary	6–4	Seattle		Driedger	17,151	10–18–4	24

January: 4–8–0 (home: 3–4–0; road: 1–4–0)
#	Date	Visitor	Score	Home	OT	Decision	Attendance	Record	Pts	Recap
33	January 1	Vancouver	5–2	Seattle		Grubauer	17,151	10–19–4	24
—	January 4	NY Islanders	–	Seattle	Postponed due to COVID-19. Rescheduled for February 22.
—	January 6	Ottawa	–	Seattle	Postponed due to COVID-19. Rescheduled for April 18.
—	January 8	Seattle	–	Winnipeg	Postponed due to attendance restrictions. Rescheduled for February 17.
34	January 10	Seattle	3–4	Colorado		Grubauer	17,516	10–20–4	24
35	January 12	Seattle	2–5	Dallas		Grubauer	17,825	10–21–4	24
36	January 13	Seattle	1–2	St. Louis		Driedger	17,017	10–22–4	24
37	January 15	Los Angeles	3–1	Seattle		Driedger	17,151	10–23–4	24
38	January 17	Chicago	2–3	Seattle	SO	Grubauer	17,151	11–23–4	26
39	January 20	San Jose	2–3	Seattle		Grubauer	17,151	12–23–4	28
40	January 21	St. Louis	5–0	Seattle		Daccord	17,151	12–24–4	28
41	January 23	Florida	3–5	Seattle		Grubauer	17,151	13–24–4	30
42	January 25	Nashville	4–2	Seattle		Grubauer	17,151	13–25–4	30
43	January 27	Seattle	2–1	Pittsburgh	OT	Grubauer	18,228	14–25–4	32
—	January 29	Seattle	–	NY Islanders	Postponed due to January 2022 North American blizzard. Rescheduled for February 2.
44	January 30	Seattle	2–3	NY Rangers		Grubauer	18,006	14–26–4	32

February: 2–8–1 (home: 0–4–1; road: 2–4–0)
#	Date	Visitor	Score	Home	OT	Decision	Attendance	Record	Pts	Recap
45	February 1	Seattle	2–3	Boston		Driedger	17,850	14–27–4	32
46	February 2	Seattle	3–0	NY Islanders		Grubauer	17,255	15–27–4	34
47	February 9	Arizona	5–2	Seattle		Grubauer	17,151	15–28–4	34
48	February 11	Seattle	4–3	Anaheim		Driedger	12,530	16–28–4	36
49	February 14	Toronto	6–2	Seattle		Grubauer	17,151	16–29–4	36
50	February 17	Seattle	3–5	Winnipeg		Grubauer	13,071	16–30–4	36
51	February 19	Seattle	1–2	Calgary		Grubauer	9,639	16–31–4	36
52	February 21	Seattle	2–5	Vancouver		Driedger	18,346	16–32–4	36
53	February 22	NY Islanders	5–2	Seattle		Grubauer	17,151	16–33–4	36
54	February 24	Boston	3–2	Seattle	OT	Grubauer	17,151	16–33–5	37
55	February 27	Seattle	1–3	San Jose		Grubauer	13,171	16–34–5	37

March: 5–6–1 (home: 2–2–0; road: 3–4–1)
#	Date	Visitor	Score	Home	OT	Decision	Attendance	Record	Pts	Recap
56	March 2	Nashville	3–4	Seattle		Driedger	17,151	17–34–5	39
57	March 5	Seattle	2–5	Washington		Driedger	18,573	17–35–5	39
58	March 6	Seattle	2–3	Carolina		Grubauer	18,156	17–36–5	39
59	March 8	Seattle	4–6	Toronto		Grubauer	17,547	17–37–5	39
60	March 10	Seattle	3–4	Ottawa	OT	Driedger	11,622	17–37–6	40
61	March 12	Seattle	4–3	Montreal	SO	Grubauer	20,608	18–37–6	42
62	March 16	Tampa Bay	4–1	Seattle		Grubauer	17,151	18–38–6	42
63	March 19	Detroit	2–4	Seattle		Grubauer	17,151	19–38–6	44
64	March 23	Seattle	4–2	Arizona		Grubauer	11,670	20–38–6	46
65	March 26	Seattle	2–4	Los Angeles		Grubauer	18,230	20–39–6	46
66	March 28	Seattle	6–1	Los Angeles		Driedger	13,919	21–39–6	48
67	March 30	Vegas	3–0	Seattle		Driedger	17,151	21–40–6	48

April: 6–8–0 (home: 5–3–0; road: 1–5–0)
#	Date	Visitor	Score	Home	OT	Decision	Attendance	Record	Pts	Recap
68	April 1	Vegas	5–2	Seattle		Grubauer	17,151	21–41–6	48
69	April 3	Dallas	1–4	Seattle		Driedger	17,151	22–41–6	50
70	April 6	Seattle	1–4	St. Louis		Driedger	18,096	22–42–6	50
71	April 7	Seattle	2–0	Chicago		Grubauer	18,677	23–42–6	52
72	April 9	Calgary	4–1	Seattle		Grubauer	17,151	23–43–6	52
73	April 12	Seattle	3–5	Calgary		Driedger	16,392	23–44–6	52
—	April 13	Seattle	–	Winnipeg	Postponed due to weather conditions. Rescheduled for May 1.
74	April 16	New Jersey	3–4	Seattle	SO	Grubauer	17,151	24–44–6	54
75	April 18	Ottawa	2–4	Seattle		Driedger	17,151	25–44–6	56
76	April 20	Colorado	2–3	Seattle		Grubauer	17,151	26–44–6	58
77	April 22	Seattle	3–6	Minnesota		Grubauer	19,047	26–45–6	58
78	April 23	Seattle	2–3	Dallas		Driedger	18,532	26–46–6	58
79	April 26	Seattle	2–5	Vancouver		Daccord	18,261	26–47–6	58
80	April 27	Los Angeles	5–3	Seattle		Grubauer	17,151	26–48–6	58
81	April 29	San Jose	0–3	Seattle		Driedger	17,151	27–48–6	60

May: 0–1–0 (home: 0–0–0; road: 0–1–0)
#	Date	Visitor	Score	Home	OT	Decision	Attendance	Record	Pts	Recap
82	May 1	Seattle	3–4	Winnipeg		Driedger	14,443	27–49–6	60

Legend: Win (2 points) Loss (0 points) Overtime/shootout loss (1 point)

== Player statistics ==
=== Skaters ===
Regular season
Player	GP	G	A	Pts	+/−	PIM
Jared McCann	74	27	23	50	–26	33
Yanni Gourde	74	21	27	48	–13	45
Jordan Eberle	79	21	23	44	–28	14
Alexander Wennberg	80	11	26	37	–26	28
Vince Dunn	73	7	28	35	–21	63
Ryan Donato	74	16	15	31	–13	40
Calle Jarnkrok^{‡}	49	12	14	26	–15	2
Adam Larsson	82	8	17	25	–23	55
Jaden Schwartz	37	8	15	23	–13	14
Mark Giordano^{‡}	55	6	17	23	–21	47
Marcus Johansson^{‡}	51	6	17	23	–22	4
Morgan Geekie	73	7	15	22	–16	18
Joonas Donskoi	75	2	20	22	–10	14
Carson Soucy	64	10	11	21	+7	47
Colin Blackwell^{‡}	39	8	9	17	+1	4
Mason Appleton^{‡}	49	6	11	17	–4	14
Riley Sheahan	69	4	13	17	+6	2
Jamie Oleksiak	72	1	16	17	–1	54
Brandon Tanev	30	9	6	15	+4	13
Matty Beniers	10	3	6	9	–1	0
Victor Rask^{†}	18	4	4	8	–3	0
Will Borgen	36	2	6	8	+1	28
Kole Lind	23	2	6	8	–1	12
Karson Kuhlman^{†}	25	2	6	8	–2	6
Daniel Sprong^{†}	16	6	0	6	–6	0
Jeremy Lauzon^{‡}	53	1	5	6	–9	67
Haydn Fleury	36	2	2	4	0	13
Derrick Pouliot^{†}	9	0	3	3	+6	2
Nathan Bastian	12	1	1	2	–1	31
Austin Czarnik^{†}	6	0	2	2	0	0
Dennis Cholowski^{†}	4	0	2	2	+1	0
Alex Barre-Boulet^{†}	2	0	1	1	0	0
Max McCormick	10	0	0	0	+1	10
Cale Fleury	9	0	0	0	–3	0
Alexander True	8	0	0	0	–2	2

=== Goaltenders ===
Regular season
Player	GP	GS	TOI	W	L	OT	GA	GAA	SA	SV%	SO	G	A	PIM
Philipp Grubauer	55	54	3,111:25	18	31	5	164	3.16	1,479	.889	2	0	1	0
Chris Driedger	27	24	1,478:24	9	14	1	73	2.96	722	.899	1	0	0	4
Joey Daccord	5	4	293:13	0	4	0	21	4.30	140	.850	0	0	0	0

^{†}Denotes player spent time with another team before joining the Kraken. Stats reflect time with the Kraken only.
^{‡}Denotes player was traded mid-season. Stats reflect time with the Kraken only.

== Player awards ==
After their final home game on April 29, the Kraken announced the inaugural winners of their player awards for the season.

Jared McCann won the Pete Muldoon Award for the Kraken's most valuable player, as voted on by Seattle-area media. Philipp Grubauer won the Three Stars of the Year Award for having accrued the most stars of any player using a point system for stars at home games. Yanni Gourde won the Guyle Fielder Award as the teammate who best exemplified "perseverance, hustle and dedication" as voted upon by his teammates and coaches. Gourde also won the Fan Favorite Award, determined by a fan vote.

== Transactions ==
The Kraken were involved in the following transactions during the 2021–22 season.

Key:

† Contract is entry-level

=== Trades ===
Date	Details		Ref
July 22, 2021	To Calgary Flames Tyler Pitlick	To Seattle Kraken 4th-round pick in 2022	
July 27, 2021	To Colorado Avalanche Kurtis MacDermid	To Seattle Kraken 4th-round pick in 2023	
July 28, 2021	To Washington Capitals Vitek Vanecek	To Seattle Kraken 2nd-round pick in 2023	
March 16, 2022	To Calgary Flames Calle Jarnkrok	To Seattle Kraken FLA 2nd-round pick in 2022; 3rd-round pick in 2023; 7th-round pick in 2024	
March 20, 2022	To Toronto Maple Leafs Mark Giordano; Colin Blackwell	To Seattle Kraken 2nd-round pick in 2022; 2nd-round pick in 2023; 4th-round pick in 2024	
March 20, 2022	To Nashville Predators Jeremy Lauzon	To Seattle Kraken 2nd-round pick in 2022	
March 20, 2022	To Winnipeg Jets Mason Appleton	To Seattle Kraken 4th-round pick in 2023	
March 21, 2022	To Washington Capitals Marcus Johansson	To Seattle Kraken Daniel Sprong; 4th-round pick in 2022; 6th-round pick in 2022	

=== Free agents acquired ===
Date	Player	Former team	Term	Ref
May 12, 2021	Luke Henman	Blainville-Boisbriand Armada (QMJHL)	3-year	
July 21, 2021	Adam Larsson	Edmonton Oilers	4-year	
July 21, 2021	Jamie Oleksiak	Dallas Stars	5-year	
July 21, 2021	Chris Driedger	Florida Panthers	3-year	
July 28, 2021	Philipp Grubauer	Colorado Avalanche	6-year	
July 28, 2021	Jaden Schwartz	St. Louis Blues	5-year	
July 28, 2021	Alexander Wennberg	Florida Panthers	3-year	
August 4, 2021	Connor Carrick	New Jersey Devils	1-year	
August 6, 2021	Marcus Johansson	Minnesota Wild	1-year	
August 20, 2021	Antoine Bibeau	Carolina Hurricanes	1-year	
August 25, 2021	Gustav Olofsson	Montreal Canadiens	1-year	
September 1, 2021	Riley Sheahan	Buffalo Sabres	1-year	
September 13, 2021	Ryan Donato	San Jose Sharks	1-year	
September 29, 2021	Max McCormick	Carolina Hurricanes	1-year	
March 1, 2022	Tye Kartye	Sault Ste. Marie Greyhounds (OHL)	3-year	
May 7, 2022	Peetro Seppala	KooKoo (Liiga)	3-year	
June 9, 2022	Ville Petman	SaiPa (Liiga)	2-year	

=== Free agents lost ===
Date	Player	New team	Ref
July 28, 2021	Gavin Bayreuther	Columbus Blue Jackets	
September 5, 2021	John Quenneville	ZSC Lions (NL)	

=== Claimed via waivers ===
Date	Player	Former team	Ref
October 11, 2021	Alex Barre-Boulet	Tampa Bay Lightning	
February 8, 2022	Austin Czarnik	New York Islanders	
February 9, 2022	Dennis Cholowski	Washington Capitals	
March 21, 2022	Derrick Pouliot	Vegas Golden Knights	

=== Lost via waivers ===
Date	Player	New team	Ref
October 14, 2021	Dennis Cholowski	Washington Capitals	
October 22, 2021	Alex Barre-Boulet	Tampa Bay Lightning	
November 25, 2021	Nathan Bastian	New Jersey Devils	

=== Other signings ===
Date	Player	Term	Ref
August 4, 2021	Alexander True	1-year	
August 5, 2021	Will Borgen	2-year	
August 6, 2021	Vince Dunn	2-year	
August 13, 2021	Cale Fleury	1-year	
August 13, 2021	Carsen Twarynski	1-year	
September 7, 2021	Dennis Cholowski	1-year	
March 8, 2022	Jared McCann	5-year	
April 10, 2022	Matty Beniers	3-year†	
April 22, 2022	Ryker Evans	3-year†	
May 9, 2022	Max McCormick	2-year	
