= List of Seattle Kraken records =

The Seattle Kraken are a professional ice hockey team based in Seattle. They are members of the Pacific Division of the National Hockey League (NHL).

Updated as of April 16, 2025

== Franchise records ==
=== Single season ===
		Year
Wins	46	2022–23
Points	100	2022–23
Longest winning streak	9	2023–24 (December 20, 2023 - January 13, 2024)
Longest losing streak	9	2021–22 (December 15, 2021 - January 15, 2022)

== Individual records ==
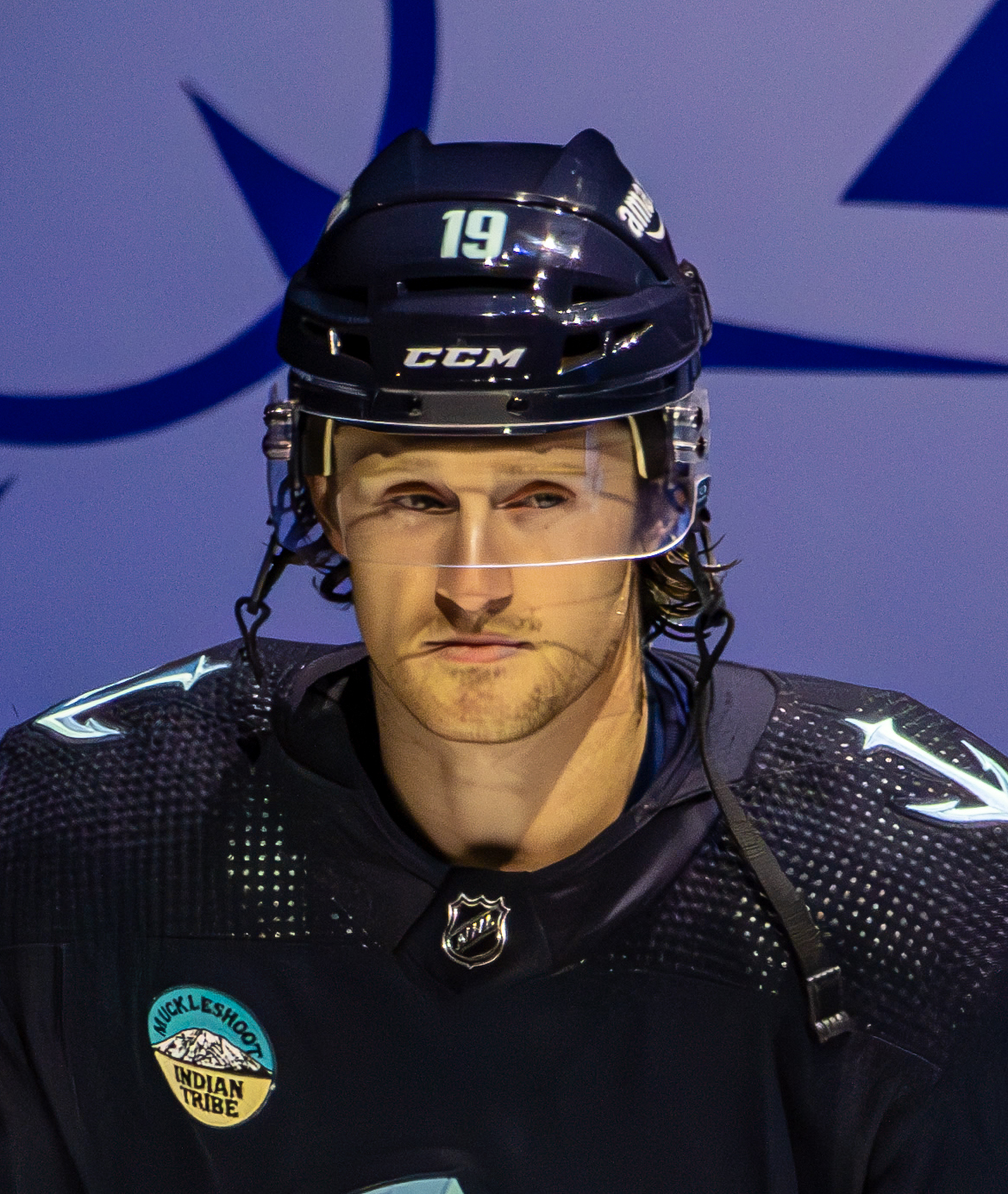
Jared McCann leads the Kraken in goals and points and is ranked fourth in games played.

=== Career ===
	Career leader		Active leader	
Games	Adam Larsson	327	Adam Larsson	327
Goals	Jared McCann	118	Jared McCann	118
Assists	Vince Dunn	141	Vince Dunn	141
Points	Jared McCann	243	Jared McCann	243
Plus-Minus	Adam Larsson	+32	Adam Larsson	+32
Penalty in Minutes	Vince Dunn	229	Vince Dunn	229
Hat-tricks	4 players tied	1	4 players tied	1
Goaltender games	Philipp Grubauer	156	Philipp Grubauer	156
Goaltender wins	Philipp Grubauer	117	Philipp Grubauer	156
Goaltender minutes	Philipp Grubauer	8,634:07	Philipp Grubauer	8,634:07
Goals Against Average	Joey Daccord	2.71	Joey Daccord	2.71
Save Percentage	Joey Daccord	.907	Joey Daccord	.907
Shutouts	Joey Daccord	5	Joey Daccord	5
Saves	Philipp Grubauer	3,589	Philipp Grubauer	3,589
Coaching wins	Dave Hakstol	107	N/A	--

== Single season ==
=== Skaters ===
	Player	Total	Year
Goals	Jared McCann	40	2022–23
Assists	Vince Dunn	50	2022–23
Points	Jared McCann	70	2022–23
Plus-Minus	Vince Dunn	+28	2022–23
Penalties in Minutes	Vince Dunn	78	2022–23
Points (Defenceman)	Vince Dunn	64	2022–23
Points (Rookie)	Matty Beniers	57	2022–23
Points streak	Vince Dunn	12 games (17 points)	2022–23

=== Goaltenders ===
	Player	Total	Year
Games	Joey Daccord	57	2024–25
Wins	Martin Jones; Joey Daccord	27	2022–23; 2024–25
Winning streak	Joey Daccord	8	2023–24
Shutouts	Martin Jones; Joey Daccord	3	2022–23; 2023–24
Goals against average	Joey Daccord	2.46	2023–24
Save percentage	Joey Daccord	.916	2023–24
Minutes played	Joey Daccord	3,295:15	2024–25
Saves	Joey Daccord	1,448	2024–25
