= Joey Daccord =

American ice hockey player (born 1996)

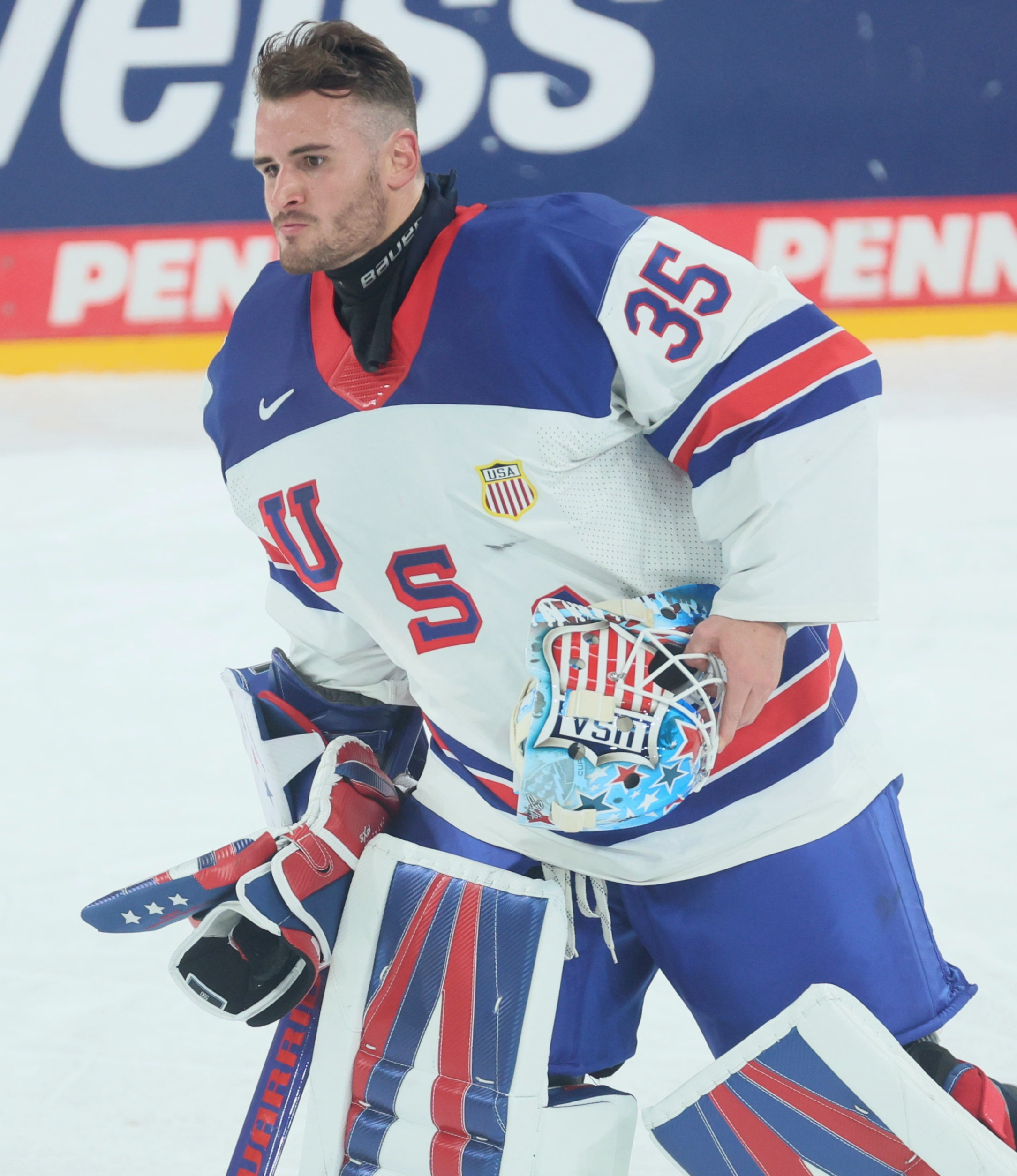
- Daccord with the United States in 2025
- Born: August 19, 1996 (age 30) North Andover, Massachusetts, U.S.
- Height: 6 ft 2 in (188 cm)
- Weight: 201 lb (91 kg; 14 st 5 lb)
- Position: Goaltender
- Catches: Left
- NHL team Former teams: Seattle Kraken; Ottawa Senators
- National team: United States
- NHL draft: 199th overall, 2015; Ottawa Senators
- Playing career: 2019–present

Joel "Joey" Daccord (born August 19, 1996) is an American professional ice hockey player who is a goaltender for the Seattle Kraken of the National Hockey League (NHL). He was selected in the seventh round, 199th overall, by the Ottawa Senators in the 2015 NHL entry draft.

Growing up in Massachusetts, Daccord played hockey in his hometown with North Andover High School, before playing three seasons with Cushing Academy. In 2015, he joined the Muskegon Lumberjacks of the United States Hockey League. The next year, he began his college hockey career with the Arizona State Sun Devils, whom he played with for three seasons. In 2019, Daccord signed a contract with the Ottawa Senators. The next season, he spent time with the team's American Hockey League (AHL) affiliate, the Belleville Senators, and their ECHL affiliate, the Brampton Beast. Daccord was eventually selected in the 2021 NHL expansion draft by the Seattle Kraken. In 2023, he led their AHL affiliate, the Coachella Valley Firebirds, to the Calder Cup Finals, losing in seven games to the Hershey Bears. In the 2023–24 season, Daccord became a full-time NHL player for the first time in his career and achieved the first-ever shutout in NHL Winter Classic history in 2024. He finished the regular season with a 2.46 goals against average and a .916 save percentage, both top-10 figures among NHL goaltenders with at least 20 games played that season.

Internationally, Daccord represents the United States, having done so at the 2025 IIHF World Championship, helping the team win their first gold medal at the tournament in 92 years.

== Playing career ==
=== Junior ===
During the 2010–11 season, Daccord started playing junior hockey in his hometown with North Andover High School. In his first season with the team, he played 22 games, tallying 11 wins and recording a 2.27 goals against average (GAA). At the start of the 2011–12 season, Daccord helped North Andover to a 3–0 record in their first three games, letting in only one goal in that span. He finished the season with four shutouts, a 1.55 GAA, a .918 save percentage, and 16 wins.

Daccord then joined Cushing Academy, starting from the 2012–13 season. In his first season with Cushing, he achieved four shutouts and 10 wins in 12 games, tallying a .926 save percentage and 2.17 GAA. On May 8, 2013, Daccord was selected 307th overall in the 2013 United States Hockey League entry draft by the Omaha Lancers, and he was then traded to the Sioux City Musketeers. During the 2013–14 season, he totaled a .923 save percentage and a 2.57 GAA through 32 games. During the 2014–15 season, his third and final with Cushing, he was named captain of the team. He finished the season with a 1.80 GAA and a .933 save percentage while notching 13 wins. After graduating from Cushing, he joined the Boston Jr. Bruins of the United States Premier Hockey League, putting up a 1.51 GAA in 11 games. Due to his performance, Daccord was named to the All-New England Preparatory School Athletic Council First Team East. On January 25, 2015, Daccord committed to the Arizona State Sun Devils. On June 27, he was selected by the Ottawa Senators in the seventh round, 199th overall, in the 2015 NHL entry draft.

Daccord was originally supposed to start the 2015–16 season with the Sioux City Musketeers, but he was traded to the Muskegon Lumberjacks prior to the campaign. To start the season, Daccord was named to the Lumberjacks opening roster on September 23, 2015. He made his USHL debut on September 26, stopping 28 of 30 shots in a 3–2 victory over the Waterloo Black Hawks. Following his performance in the game, Daccord was named USHL Goaltender of the Week. He recorded his first USHL shutout on November 14, making 27 saves in a 1–0 win against the Fargo Force. Daccord was then named USHL Goaltender of the Week once again. On November 20, he notched another shutout, achieving 24 saves in a 2–0 victory against the Dubuque Fighting Saints. Daccord made a season-high 46 saves in a 4–2 win over the Omaha Lancers on February 27, 2016. He finished the season with 21 wins, a 3.10 GAA, and a .904 save percentage, also setting a Lumberjacks franchise record for most saves in a season, with 1,344.

=== Collegiate ===
Daccord joined the Arizona State Sun Devils for the 2016–17 season. He made his college hockey debut on October 7, 2016, making 44 saves but letting in nine goals in a 9–2 loss to the Notre Dame Fighting Irish. Daccord achieved his first collegiate win on October 16, making 24 saves in a 5–2 victory over the Air Force Falcons, in turn helping the Sun Devils capture their first victory over a ranked opponent. The team's second win against a ranked team came on January 28, 2017, when Daccord made a franchise record 53 saves in a 4–2 upset of the Quinnipiac Bobcats. On February 4, the record became 54, after Daccord stopped that many to help the Sun Devils to a 2–2 tie against the Western Michigan Broncos with the game ending in the second overtime. He finished his first collegiate season with a 3–8–1 record, a 4.03 GAA, and a .892 save percentage, with 12 of his 13 games being against ranked teams.

On October 28, 2017, during the 2017–18 season, Daccord posted 47 saves in a 1–1 tie with the Colgate Raiders. He tallied his first collegiate assist on November 4 on a goal by Brian Pasichnuk in a 3–1 loss to the Alabama–Huntsville Chargers. During the Ice Vegas Invitational on January 6, 2018, Daccord recorded his second assist of the season, also making 36 saves in a 3–2 victory over the Michigan Tech Huskies to win the tournament. On January 13, he recorded his first collegiate shutout, making 28 saves in a 4–0 win against the UMass Lowell River Hawks. Daccord tallied a season-high 52 saves on February 3 in a 4–3 loss to the Yale Bulldogs. During the season, Daccord started every game for the Sun Devils but two, going 8–19–5, managing a 3.51 GAA and a .909 save percentage. That season, he faced 1193 shots, the most seen by any collegiate goaltender.

Daccord recorded his third career assist in the Sun Devils' 2018–19 season opener on October 6, 2018, also notching a shutout in a 3–0 victory over the Alaska Nanooks. The next day, Daccord recorded his second shutout of the season in a 5–0 win against the Nanooks, giving the Sun Devils their first series sweep in franchise history. His third shutout came on November 10 after making 20 saves in a 2–0 win over the Michigan State Spartans. On December 7, he tallied a season-high 45 saves in a 4–0 shutout of the Princeton Tigers. Just eight days later, he achieved his fifth shutout, making 31 saves in a 4–0 victory against the Colorado College Tigers. On January 5, 2019, Daccord helped the Sun Devils sweep the Boston College Eagles, making 32 saves in a 2–0 win over his childhood dream school. On January 16, Daccord was named a finalist for the Hobey Baker Award, given to the top men's collegiate hockey player. Ten days later, he recorded his seventh and final shutout of the season, putting up 28 saves in a 3–0 win over the Boston University Terriers. On March 28, he was designated as a finalist for the Mike Richter Award, awarded to the best collegiate goaltender. Two days later, in the Sun Devils' first appearance in the NCAA Tournament, Daccord backstopped the team in a 2–1 loss to the Quinnipiac Bobcats. In total, his seven shutouts, .926 save percentage, 2.35 GAA, and 21 wins, all set Sun Devils records for goaltenders in a season. During the season, he started all 35 games for the Sun Devils and played 99% of the team's total minutes. His shutout total was tied with that of only Hunter Shepard for the lead among collegiate goaltenders.

On April 1, 2019, the Ottawa Senators signed Daccord to a two-year, entry-level contract. In doing so, he became the first player in Arizona State University history to sign an NHL contract. Daccord made his NHL debut on April 4, making 35 saves in a 5–2 loss to the Buffalo Sabres. The Senators had one game remaining in the season two days later, for which he was a healthy scratch. On April 12, Daccord was named an AHCA West Second Team All-American, becoming the first player in Sun Devils history to earn All-America honors. On April 30, Daccord was named the Sun Devils' most valuable player for the 2018–19 season.

=== Professional ===
==== Ottawa Senators ====
Prior to the 2019–20 season, Daccord participated in the Senators' training camp. On September 21, 2019, Daccord was reassigned to the Senators' American Hockey League (AHL) affiliate, the Belleville Senators. As Marcus Hogberg and Filip Gustavsson were in net with Belleville, Daccord was assigned to the Senators' ECHL affiliate, the Brampton Beast, on October 1. He made his ECHL debut on October 12, making 25 saves on 29 shots in a 4–3 loss to the Toledo Walleye. He recorded his first professional shutout on November 8, making 23 saves in a 3–0 victory over the Cincinnati Cyclones. After an injury to Craig Anderson in Ottawa caused Marcus Hogberg to be recalled to the NHL, a spot opened in Belleville, leading Daccord to be reassigned to the AHL on November 27. Three days later, he made his AHL debut, stopping 26 of 27 shots in a 3–1 victory against the Hershey Bears. After playing only that one game, Daccord was assigned back to the ECHL on December 7. The next day, Daccord played his final ECHL game, making 35 saves in a 2–1 win over the Reading Royals. Daccord finished his time with the Beast having won seven games and achieved a 2.85 GAA and a .901 save percentage. On December 9, after Anders Nilsson was sidelined with a concussion in Ottawa, Hogberg was once again reassigned to the NHL, allowing Daccord to rejoin Belleville. In his first five games with Belleville, he posted a 4–1–0 record and a .908 save percentage. On January 11, 2020, Daccord made 26 saves in a 4–0 shutout of the Utica Comets, his first in the AHL. Daccord finished the season with Belleville, winning 15 games out of 24 and posting a 2.61 GAA, a .915 save percentage, and three assists.

On October 17, 2020, the Senators re-signed Daccord to a three-year contract extension. During the shortened 2020–21 season, on January 13, 2021, Daccord was named to the Senators' taxi squad, taxi squads being a safety measure put in place by the NHL for that season. On February 10, Daccord was reassigned to the AHL to open the season with Belleville. In two games in he AHL, he allowed five goals in both but managed a .867 save percentage. On February 20, he was recalled to Ottawa's taxi squad after Marcus Hogberg was injured. The next day, he was moved off the team's taxi squad onto the main roster. On March 14, during warmups in a game against the Toronto Maple Leafs, with Daccord serving as backup, starting goaltender Matt Murray suffered an injury. Daccord went on to play the game, making 33 saves in a 4–3 win for his first career NHL victory. In a game three days later versus the Vancouver Canucks, Daccord suffered a significant leg injury in the third period, forcing him to leave the game and miss the rest of the season. Daccord had played eight games, making six starts, and had a record of 1–3–1, achieving a 3.27 GAA and a .897 save percentage.

==== Seattle Kraken ====
On July 21, 2021, Daccord was selected by the Seattle Kraken, the NHL's expansion team for the 2021–22 season, in the 2021 NHL expansion draft. After attending the Kraken's training camp, he was assigned to the Kraken's AHL affiliate, the Charlotte Checkers on October 8, joining goaltenders Antoine Bibeau and Evan Fitzpatrick. He played his first game with the Checkers on October 17, making 26 saves on 27 shots in a 4–1 defeat of the Wilkes-Barre/Scranton Penguins, giving the Checkers their first win of the season. Two days later, Daccord was recalled by the Kraken due to an injury to Chris Driedger. That same day, he started his first game for the Kraken, making 29 saves in a 4–2 loss to the New Jersey Devils. On November 1, Daccord played his second game of the season, putting up 18 saves in a 5–2 loss to the Edmonton Oilers. The next day, it was announced that Driedger would be rejoining the Kraken's roster, and Daccord was subsequently reassigned to the Checkers. After putting up a .918 save percentage in his next seven AHL games, Daccord was called back up to the Kraken on December 1 after Driedger suffered another injury. In a game on December 6, the Pittsburgh Penguins took a 3–0 over the Kraken 5:07, leading starting goaltender Philipp Grubauer to be pulled. Daccord stepped up in net, but the Kraken nonetheless suffered a 6–1 defeat. After Driedger rejoined the team, Daccord was reassigned to the Checkers on December 11.

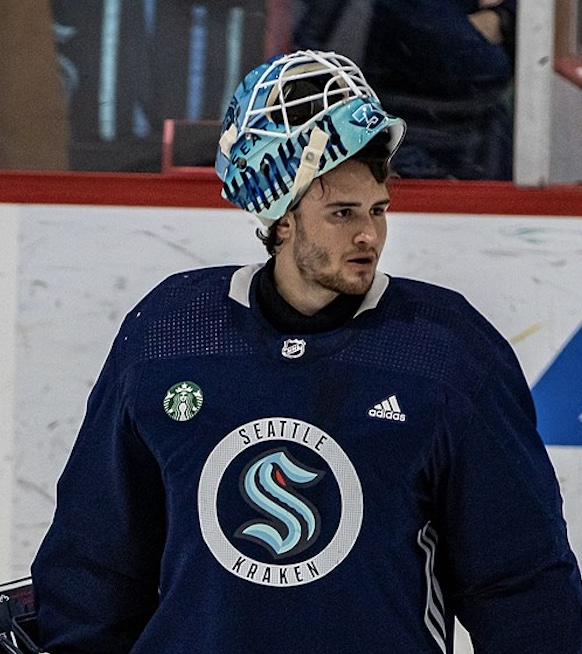
Daccord during Kraken practice after being called up on April 25

After Daccord played two games in Charlotte, he was called up to the Kraken's taxi squad on December 28, 2021. His time on the taxi squad was short-lived, as he was sent back down to the Checkers on January 3, 2022. Six days later, Daccord put on a 40-save performance for the Checkers in a 3–2 shootout victory over the Bridgeport Islanders. After notching an 8–5–1 record and placing fourth in the AHL in GAA and save percentage, Daccord was recalled by the Kraken on January 18 after Driedger was placed on the COVID-19 protocol list. After appearing once more for the Kraken in a 5–0 loss to the St. Louis Blues, he was reassigned to the Checkers on February 2. On March 11, he totaled a season-high 44 saves in a 5–1 Checkers victory over the Springfield Thunderbirds. For March, Daccord was named the AHL Goaltender of the Month after posting a 6–1–0 record while maintaining a 1.55 GAA and a .956 save percentage. On April 8, with Daccord in net, the Checkers beat the Hartford Wolf Pack 3–2, making them the first Eastern Conference team to clinch a playoff spot. With the Checkers, Daccord finished the regular season with a .925 save percentage and 2.28 GAA, achieving a 19–11–2 record through 34 games. His save percentage ranked second in the league and set a Checkers franchise record. On After Daccord was recalled by the Kraken on April 25, he stood in net during a 5–2 defeat at the hands of the Vancouver Canucks the next day. With the Kraken during their inaugural season, Daccord went 0–4–0 in five games played, recording a 4.30 GAA and .850 save percentage. April 28, Daccord was assigned to Charlotte to start the 2022 Calder Cup playoffs. As the Checkers had clinched a bye for round one, Daccord's first Calder Cup playoff appearance came on May 11 in game one of round two against the Bridgeport Islanders, in which he made 25 saves in a 3–2 victory. On May 17, Daccord helped the Checkers advance to the third round of the playoffs, tallying 21 saves in 4–0 shutout to clinch the best-of-five series. The third round would be the end of the Checkers' playoff run, the team getting swept in three games by the Springfield Thunderbirds. Daccord finished his first Calder Cup playoffs with a 3.15 GAA and a .879 save percentage.

On October 8, 2022, prior to the 2022–23 season, Daccord was placed on waivers for the purpose of being assigned to the team's new AHL affiliate, the Coachella Valley Firebirds. The next day, he cleared waivers and was assigned to the team. On October 16, Daccord stopped 25 shots in a 6–5 victory over the Calgary Wranglers, the Firebirds' first win in franchise history. Daccord played three games with the Firebirds before he was recalled by the Kraken on October 22 after Philipp Grubauer suffered an injury. On November 1, Daccord made 36 saves in a 5–2 defeat of the Calgary Flames to earn him his first career NHL victory. After being reassigned to the Firebirds, he made 33 saves in a 4–3 victory over the Tucson Roadrunners on November 12. On December 2, Daccord achieved the first shutout in Firebirds history, making 26 saves in a 1–0 win over the Henderson Silver Knights. His second shutout of the season came on December 23, making 31 saves in another 1–0 victory against the Silver Knights. On January 7, Daccord made 39 saves to notch his third shutout of the season in a 4–0 victory against the San Jose Barracuda. Daccord helped the Firebirds reach the 40-win mark during their inaugural season, making 36 saves in a 3–1 defeat of the Iowa Wild on March 17. On March 20, Daccord was called up to the Kraken after Grubauer was out with an illness. After playing two games with the Kraken, going 1–0–1, he was Daccord was reassigned to the Firebirds on March 25. Daccord played three more games with the Firebirds before he was once again recalled by the Kraken on April 9. Daccord played two more games with the Kraken, finishing his season with a 2–1–1 record in five games with the team, tallying a 3.14 GAA and a .900 save percentage. Daccord was reassigned to the Firebirds on April 14, playing one more game with the team the next day. With the Firebirds, he finished the season with a 26–8–3 record as well as a GAA of 2.38 and .918 save percentage, both fifth best in the AHL.

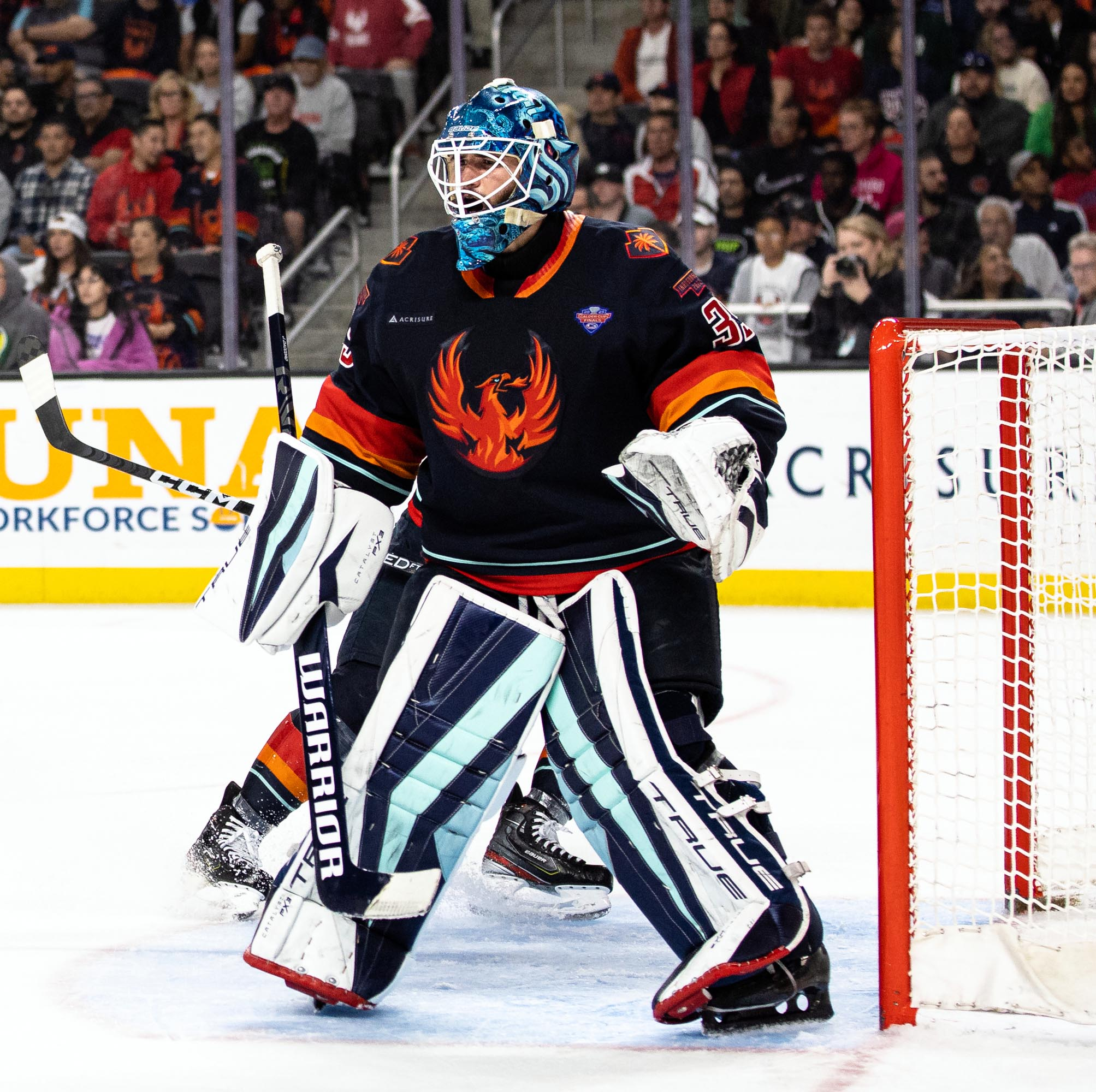
Daccord with the Firebirds during the 2023 Calder Cup Finals

In the first game of the first round of the 2023 Calder Cup playoffs, Daccord posted 45 saves in a 5–1 win over the Tucson Roadrunners, the Firebirds' first ever postseason victory. After defeating the Roadrunners, in three games, the Firebirds faced the Colorado Eagles in the second round. In game five on May 5, Daccord notched 33 saves in a 5–0 shutout to help the Firebirds advance to the third round. In game three of the series against the Calgary Wranglers on May 16, Daccord made 60 saves in a 3–2 triple overtime victory. After advancing to the Western Conference Final against the Milwaukee Admirals, Daccord and the Firebirds beat them in six games to advance to the Calder Cup Finals. On June 8, in game one of the Finals against the Hershey Bears, Daccord posted 25 saves in a 5–0 victory. Two days later, in game two, Daccord achieved his second shutout of the Finals, notching 33 saves in a 4–0 defeat of the Bears, also tallying his second assist of the playoffs while doing so. Daccord became the first goaltender to start the Calder Cup Finals with two straight shutouts since Maurice Roberts of the Cleveland Barons in 1939. Despite Daccord's effort, the Firebirds lost the series in seven games, the Bears becoming Calder Cup champions. Through the playoffs, Daccord started all 26 games, an AHL record, registering a GAA of 2.22 and a .926 save percentage, leading goaltenders that postseason with at least nine games played. He set AHL playoff records for saves, with 726; minutes played, with 1,647; and shots faced, with 823. He recorded three assists during the playoffs, the most since the statistic started being tracked.

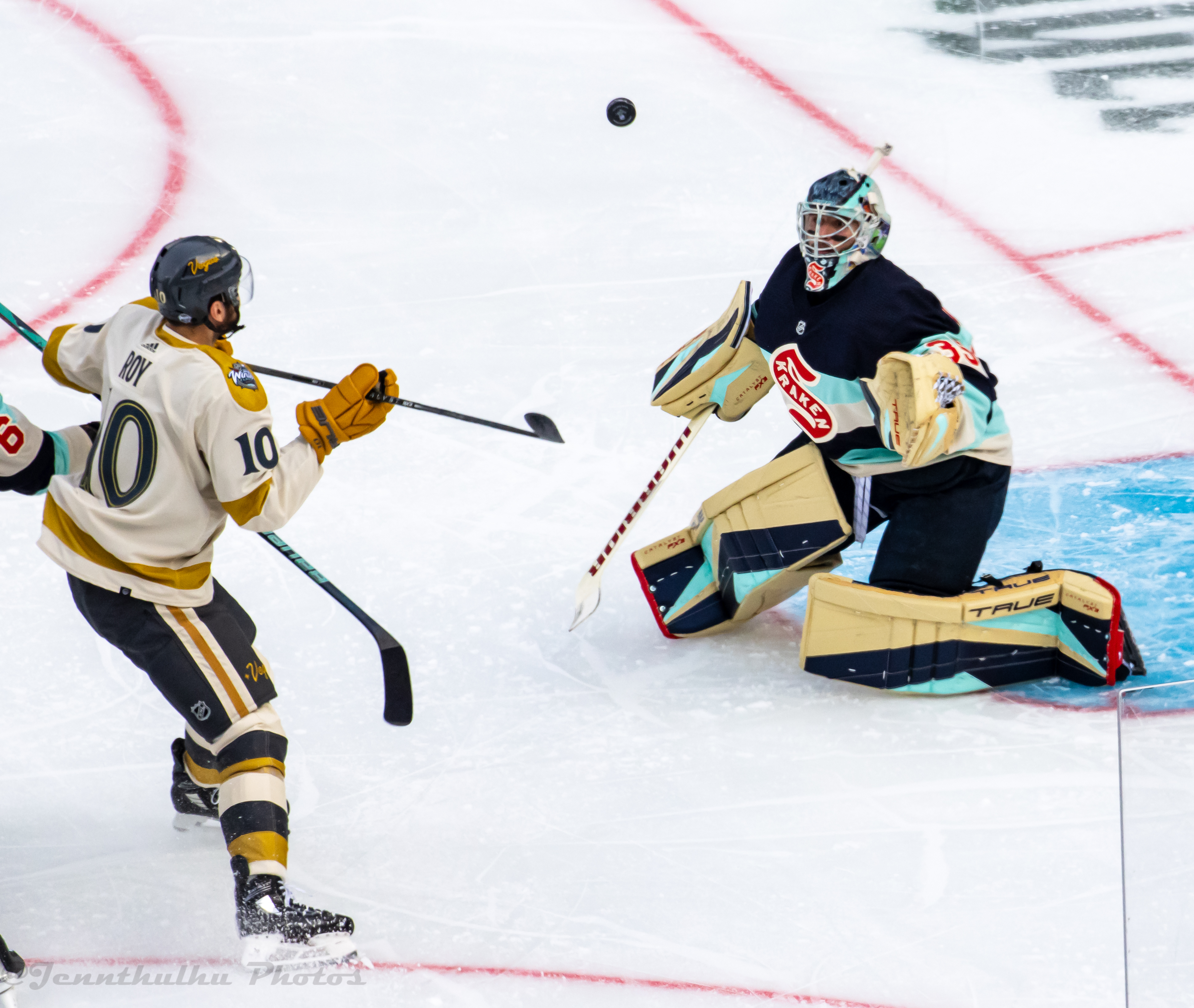
Daccord with the Kraken at the 2024 NHL Winter Classic

On June 30, 2023, Daccord re-signed with the Kraken to a two-year contract worth US$1,200,000 annually. Prior to the 2023–24 season, Daccord and Chris Driedger were vying for the Kraken's backup goaltender spot behind Philipp Grubauer. Daccord managed to impress, earning a spot on the Kraken's opening night roster. He played his first game of the season on October 14, making 25 saves in a 2–1 shootout loss to the St. Louis Blues, earning himself the honor of being Second Star of the Game. On October 26, Daccord made a franchise-record 42 saves in a 3–2 overtime defeat at the hands of the Carolina Hurricanes. On December 9, Grubauer left a game against the Tampa Bay Lightning with a lower-body injury in the second period, leaving Daccord to take his place. The next day, it was announced that Grubauer would be placed in injured reserve, leaving Daccord as the Kraken's starter and Driedger as his backup. Daccord achieved his first NHL shutout on December 12 in a 4–0 victory against the Florida Panthers, making 24 saves and helping end the Kraken's eight-game losing streak. After going 5–1–2 since Grubauer's injury helping the Kraken reach a franchise-high eight-game point streak, Daccord started for the Kraken at the 2024 NHL Winter Classic, an annual outdoor game, on January 1, 2024. During the game, he made 35 saves in a 3–0 win over the Vegas Golden Knights to record the first-ever shutout in Winter Classic history. After winning four more games, Daccord helped the Kraken reach a franchise-record nine-game win streak and 13-game point streak on January 13. Following the hot streak, the Kraken lost their next four games, snapping the losing streak on January 24 with Daccord in net. Grubauer had returned to the Kraken's roster the previous day, reuniting the team's tandem. On March 26, Daccord made 12 saves to record his third shutout of the season in a 4–0 win over the Anaheim Ducks. Daccord finished his first full NHL season with a 19–18–11 record in 50 games, putting up,a 2.46 GAA and .918 save percentage.

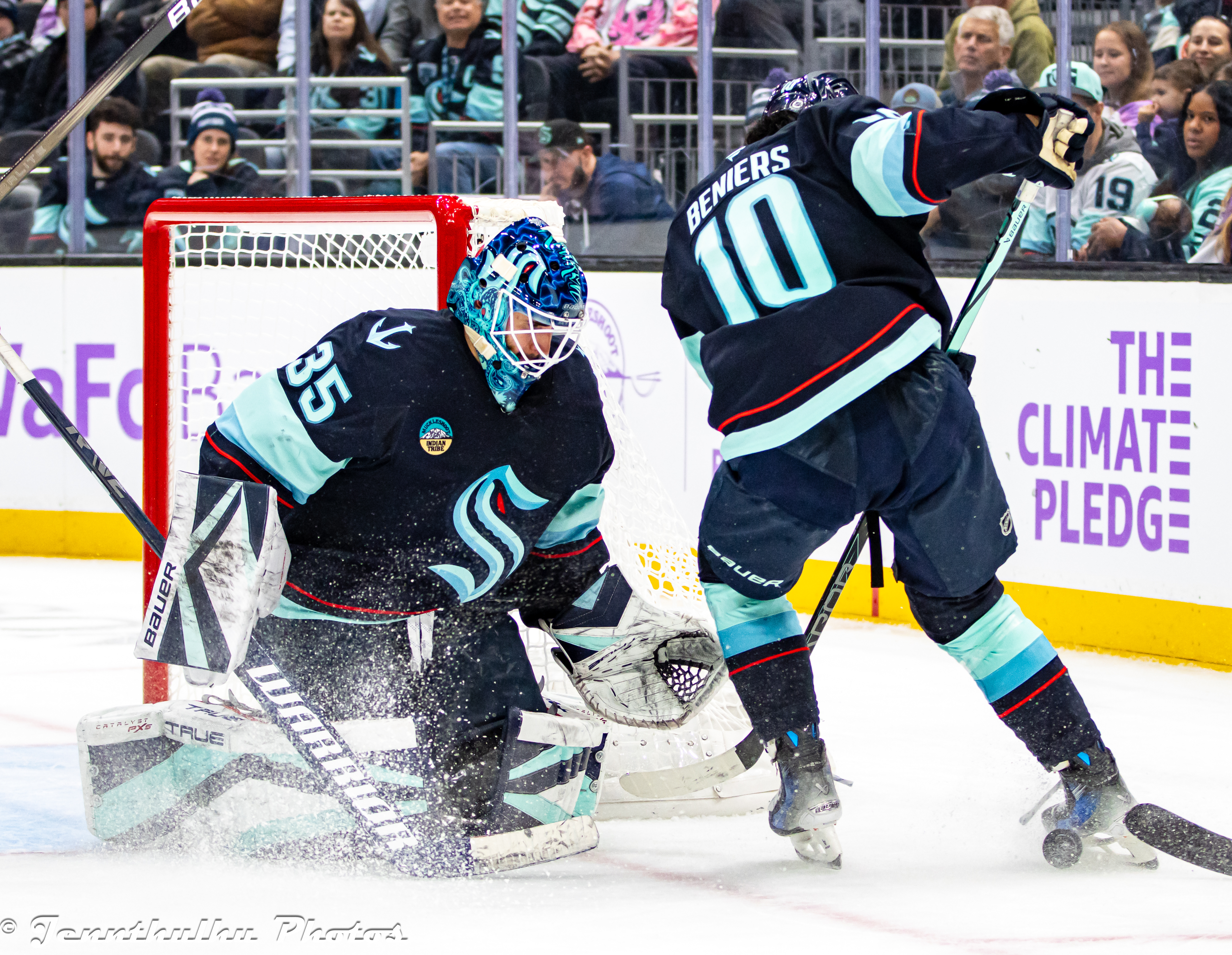
Daccord and Matty Beniers during the former's shutout on November 20, 2024

On October 8, 2024, Daccord was named to the Kraken's opening roster for the 2024–25 season. The next day, he signed a five-year, US$25,000,000 contract extension with the team. Daccord made his season debut during the Kraken's second game on October 12, making 34 saves in a 5–4 shootout win against the Minnesota Wild. On November 20, Daccord made 24 saves in a 3–0 shutout of the Nashville Predators, helping the Kraken to win five of a set of six home games. On December 8, Daccord suffered from an illness, causing him to miss a game against the New York Rangers. On December 19, in a game against the Chicago Blackhawks, he took a puck to the wrist, causing him to miss five games. On January 14, 2025, Daccord tallied his first career NHL assist against the Pittsburgh Penguins, making 31 saves in a 4–2 victory. On January 23, he played his 100th career NHL game, notching 30 saves in a 3–0 loss to the Washington Capitals. After letting five goals midway through a game against the St. Louis Blues on February 25, he was pulled from the game and replaced by Nikke Kokko, in what would become his NHL debut, but also a 7–2 loss. Daccord achieved his fifth career shutout on April 2, making 24 saves in a 5–0 win over the Vancouver Canucks. On April 8, he let in seven goals in the first two periods of a game against the Utah Hockey Club. Daccord was once again pulled from the game, allowing Victor Ostman to make his NHL debut, during which he allowed no goals in what would be a 7–1 loss. Daccord finished the season with a 2.75 GAA and .906 save percentage while going 27–23–5 in 57 games, also recording two assists. Daccord was named the Kraken's most valuable player for the season as voted on by regional Seattle media.

On October 3, 2025, Daccord's number 35 was retired by the Arizona State Sun Devils. On October 9, Daccord played in the Kraken's season opener for the first time in his career, making 35 saves in 36 shots in a 3–1 win over the Anaheim Ducks. Daccord recorded the sixth shutout of his career on October 23, stopping 32 shots in a 3–0 victory over the Winnipeg Jets. After a game against the St. Louis Blues on November 8, Daccord was evaluated for an upper-body injury. The injury caused him to miss five games, and he returned in November 18 in a 4–2 loss to the Detroit Red Wings. On November 23, Daccord made 31 saves in a 1–0 shootout loss to the New York Islanders, earning him his seventh career shutout. On December 18, he tallied a season-high 42 saves in a 4–2 loss to the Calgary Flames. Daccord helped the Kraken beat the Carolina Hurricanes, then the second best team in the NHL, making 35 saves in a 2–1 victory. On April 9, Daccord backstopped the Kraken in a 4–3 shootout defeat of the Vegas Golden Knights. Later, it was announced that in that game, Daccord had suffered an injury, causing him to miss the end of the season and allowing Nikke Kokko and Victor Ostman to play in his place. Daccord finished the season with a 3.03 GAA, a .897 save percentage, annd three assists after going 20–20–6 in 47 games.

== International play ==
Medal record

Representing United States

Ice hockey

World Championships
Gold medal – first place	2025 Sweden/Denmark	

On April 25, 2025, Daccord was selected to represent the United States at the 2025 IIHF World Championship. In the team's opening game against Denmark, Daccord earned a 26-save shutout in a 5–0 victory. In three games, Daccord achieved two wins, a 2.00 GAA, and a .919 save percentage. With Jeremy Swayman in net, the United States beat Switzerland 1–0 on May 25 to win the gold medal at the World Championships for the first time in 92 years.

== Personal life ==
Daccord was born on August 19, 1996, to parents Brian and Daniela in North Andover, Massachusetts. Daccord is a citizen of Canada, Switzerland and the United States, but has chosen to represent the United States in international competition. He is fluent in German and Swiss German.

Brian Daccord is a former goaltender who played professionally in the National League in Switzerland and is currently the President and Founder of Stop It Goaltending. He has worked for the Arizona Coyotes as a special assistant to the general manager, as well as the director of goaltending operations, and for the Toronto Maple Leafs as a goaltending scout. Brian is also a former goaltending coach of the Boston Bruins. Joey's younger brother, Alex, played goaltender for Saint Anselm College and his uncle, Tom, played professionally in Switzerland.

== Career statistics ==
=== Regular season and playoffs ===
			Regular season									Playoffs
Season	Team	League	GP	W	L	OTL	MIN	GA	SO	GAA	SV%	GP	W	L	MIN	GA	SO	GAA	SV%
2012–13	Cushing Academy	HS-MA	12	—	—	—	—	—	—	1.96	.926	—	—	—	—	—	—	—	—
2013–14	Cushing Academy	HS-MA	32	—	—	—	—	—	—	2.57	.923	—	—	—	—	—	—	—	—
2014–15	Cushing Academy	HS-MA	16	—	—	—	—	—	—	1.80	.933	—	—	—	—	—	—	—	—
2015–16	Muskegon Lumberjacks	USHL	48	21	20	5	2,764	143	2	3.10	.904	—	—	—	—	—	—	—	—
2016–17	Arizona State University	NCAA	15	3	8	1	730	49	0	4.03	.892	—	—	—	—	—	—	—	—
2017–18	Arizona State University	NCAA	32	8	19	5	1,864	109	1	3.51	.909	—	—	—	—	—	—	—	—
2018–19	Arizona State University	NCAA	35	21	13	1	2,093	82	7	2.35	.926	—	—	—	—	—	—	—	—
2018–19	Ottawa Senators	NHL	1	0	1	0	60	5	0	5.00	.875	—	—	—	—	—	—	—	—
2019–20	Belleville Senators	AHL	24	15	6	2	1,401	61	1	2.61	.915	—	—	—	—	—	—	—	—
2019–20	Brampton Beast	ECHL	12	7	5	0	715	34	1	2.85	.901	—	—	—	—	—	—	—	—
2020–21	Belleville Senators	AHL	2	0	2	0	120	10	0	5.00	.867	—	—	—	—	—	—	—	—
2020–21	Ottawa Senators	NHL	8	1	3	1	403	22	0	3.27	.897	—	—	—	—	—	—	—	—
2021–22	Charlotte Checkers	AHL	34	19	11	2	1,918	73	0	2.28	.925	7	3	4	419	22	1	3.15	.879
2021–22	Seattle Kraken	NHL	5	0	4	0	294	21	0	4.30	.850	—	—	—	—	—	—	—	—
2022–23	Coachella Valley Firebirds	AHL	38	26	8	3	2,269	90	3	2.38	.918	26	15	11	1,648	61	3	2.22	.926
2022–23	Seattle Kraken	NHL	5	2	1	1	249	13	0	3.14	.900	—	—	—	—	—	—	—	—
2023–24	Seattle Kraken	NHL	50	19	18	11	2,833	116	3	2.46	.916	—	—	—	—	—	—	—	—
2024–25	Seattle Kraken	NHL	57	27	23	5	3,295	150	2	2.73	.906	—	—	—	—	—	—	—	—
2025–26	Seattle Kraken	NHL	47	20	20	6	2,693	134	2	2.99	.897	—	—	—	—	—	—	—	—
NHL totals			173	69	70	24	9,826	461	7	2.83	.904	—	—	—	—	—	—	—	—

=== International ===
Year	Team	Event	Result	GP	W	L	T	MIN	GA	SO	GAA	SV%
2025	United States	WC	1st place, gold medalist(s)	3	2	1	0	180	6	1	2.00	.919
Senior totals				3	2	1	0	180	6	1	2.00	.919

== Awards and honors ==
Award	Year	Ref
College
AHCA West Second Team All-American	2018–19	
