= Chris Driedger =

Canadian ice hockey player (born 1994)

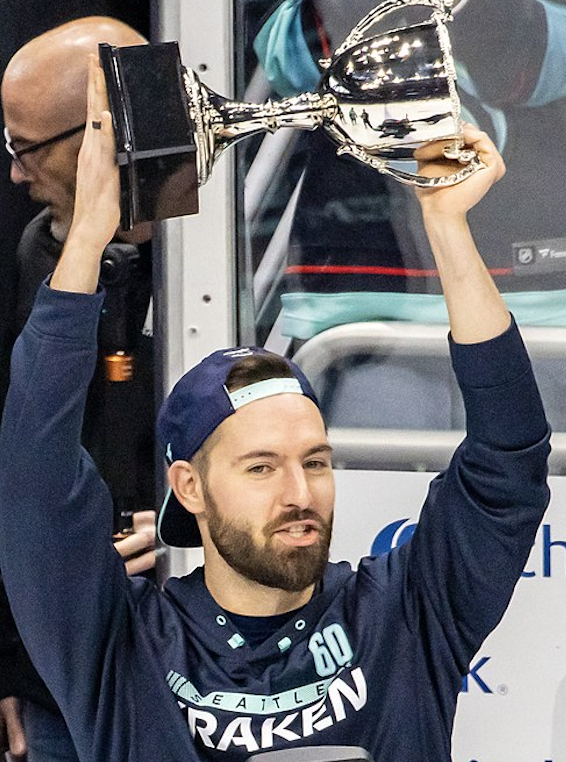
- Dreidger with the Seattle Kraken in 2023
- Born: May 18, 1994 (age 32) Winnipeg, Manitoba, Canada
- Height: 6 ft 3 in (191 cm)
- Weight: 206 lb (93 kg; 14 st 10 lb)
- Position: Goaltender
- Catches: Left
- NHL team Former teams: Vancouver Canucks; Ottawa Senators; Florida Panthers; Seattle Kraken; Traktor Chelyabinsk
- National team: Canada
- NHL draft: 76th overall, 2012; Ottawa Senators
- Playing career: 2014–present

Chris Driedger (born May 18, 1994) is a Canadian professional ice hockey goaltender for the Vancouver Canucks of the National Hockey League (NHL). Driedger was selected by the Ottawa Senators in the third round, 76th overall, of the 2012 NHL entry draft.

After growing up in Winnipeg, Driedger was drafted by the Western Hockey League (WHL)'s Tri-City Americans. After one season with the team, he was traded to the Calgary Hitmen, where he would play three seasons. In 2014, Driedger signed a three-year contract with his NHL draft team, the Ottawa Senators. He made his NHL debut in 2015, but in five seasons with the Senators organization, he spent most of his time in the ECHL or American Hockey League (AHL). In 2018, he signed for one year with the AHL's Springfield Thunderbirds, the primary affiliate of the Florida Panthers. After 16 games with the Thunderbirds, Driedger signed a contract with the Panthers for the rest of that season. After the season, Driedger re-signed for two years with the Panthers.

After those two seasons, in 2021, during the expansion team Seattle Kraken's exclusive signing window, Driedger signed a three-year contract with the Kraken. He would count as the Kraken's selection from the Panthers at the 2021 NHL entry draft. Driedger spent the Kraken's inaugural season only in season, but over the next two, he would also spend time with the Kraken's AHL affiliate, the Coachella Valley Firebirds. In 2024, he helped the Firebirds to the Calder Cup final, where the Firebirds lost to the Hershey Bears in six games. After that season, Driedger returned to the Panthers, signing with the team for one year. Before the NHL trade deadline, he was traded to his hometown Winnipeg Jets. With either team that season, Driedger only ever played with their AHL affiliate. The next season, Driedger turned to Russia, signing for one year with the Kontinental Hockey League's Traktor Chelyabinsk. Only five months later, Driedger and the team mutually terminated the contract. He signed with the Canucks on August 27th, 2026.

Driedger participated in the 2011 World U-17 Hockey Challenge, playing four games for Canada West. Eleven years later, Driedger played at the 2022 IIHF World Championship, playing six games and helping Canada earn the silver medal.

== Playing career ==
=== Junior ===
Driedger was born on May 18, 1994, in Winnipeg, Manitoba, to parents Cindy and Kelly. Growing up there, Driedger played bantam and midget ice hockey for the Winnipeg Monarchs organization. As a result of his play at these levels, Driedger was drafted 80th overall by the Tri-City Americans of the Western Hockey League (WHL) in the 2009 WHL bantam draft. He returned to the Monarchs for the 2009–10 season, in which he totaled a 13–6–0 record with a 2.14 goals against average (GAA) and five shutouts. Driedger then began his major junior hockey career with the Americans during the 2010–11 season. While playing at the major junior level, Driedger was also enrolled at St. Paul's High School and competed in track. In his rookie season with the Americans, Driedger compiled a 1–1 record along with a 3.73 GAA and a .876 save percentage through four games. He finished the season amassing a 6–6–0–1 record through 22 games while also accumulating a 3.50 GAA and a 0.881 save percentage. As such, Driedger was invited to participate in Hockey Canada's Program of Excellence Goaltending Camp.

Following the 2010–11 season, Driedger was acquired by the Calgary Hitmen in an off-season trade in exchange for a 3rd round pick in the 2012 WHL bantam draft. His first season with the Hitmen began with a slow start due to a high ankle sprain and a loss in his first start. His performance continued to decline, and his 2.03 GAA and a 4–2–0–1 record dropped to a 3–3–1–0 record and 3.79 GAA in November. As he continued to drop in December, he was encouraged to seek the help of a sports psychologist. The Hitmen eventually established a tandem goaltending system with Driedger and Brandon Glover, who split the starting position throughout the season. By April, Driedger doubled the number of games from his previous season with the American and established a 24–12–2–1 record with a 2.80 GAA and .896 save percentage. Driedger's outstanding play was recognized when he was invited to compete at the 2012 CHL/NHL Top Prospects Game for Team Orr.

As the season concluded, Driedger was ranked 13th among North American goaltending prospects eligible for the 2012 NHL entry draft. He was eventually drafted by the Ottawa Senators in the third round, 76th overall, making him the only WHL goaltender claimed in 2012. Before the draft, the Hitmen traded Brandon Glover to the Seattle Thunderbirds, making Driedger the de facto starter for the 2012–13 season. As a result of this responsibility, Driedger prepared himself physically and mentally during the offseason to ready himself for the next season. Once the season began, Driedger earned a 10–3–1–1 record, a 2.37 GAA, and a .920 save percentage by mid-November. The Hitmen also relied on rookie netminder Mack Shields, who yielded a 3–2–0–1 record. By the end of the month, Driedger improved to a 19–6–1–2 record to lead the Hitmen to the top of the standings of the Eastern Conference. As such, he was recognized as the WHL's Goaltender of the Month for November. His play continued to improve as the season progressed, and he helped the Hitmen qualify for the 2013 WHL Playoffs as the team's starting goaltender.

Driedger continued to play with the Calgary Hitmen through to the end of the 2013–14 season. During his final season in the WHL, on February 1, 2014, Driedger was the last member of the Calgary Hitmen to play the puck before it was inadvertently put into the empty net of the Kootenay Ice, becoming the sixth goaltender in WHL history, and the first in Hitmen franchise history, to be credited with scoring a goal. He also became the Hitmen's all-time saves leader, surpassing Martin Jones's mark of 3,374. Driedger completed his major junior career with 170 regular season WHL games played and a record of 94–46–15, including eight shutouts.

=== Professional ===
==== Ottawa Senators ====
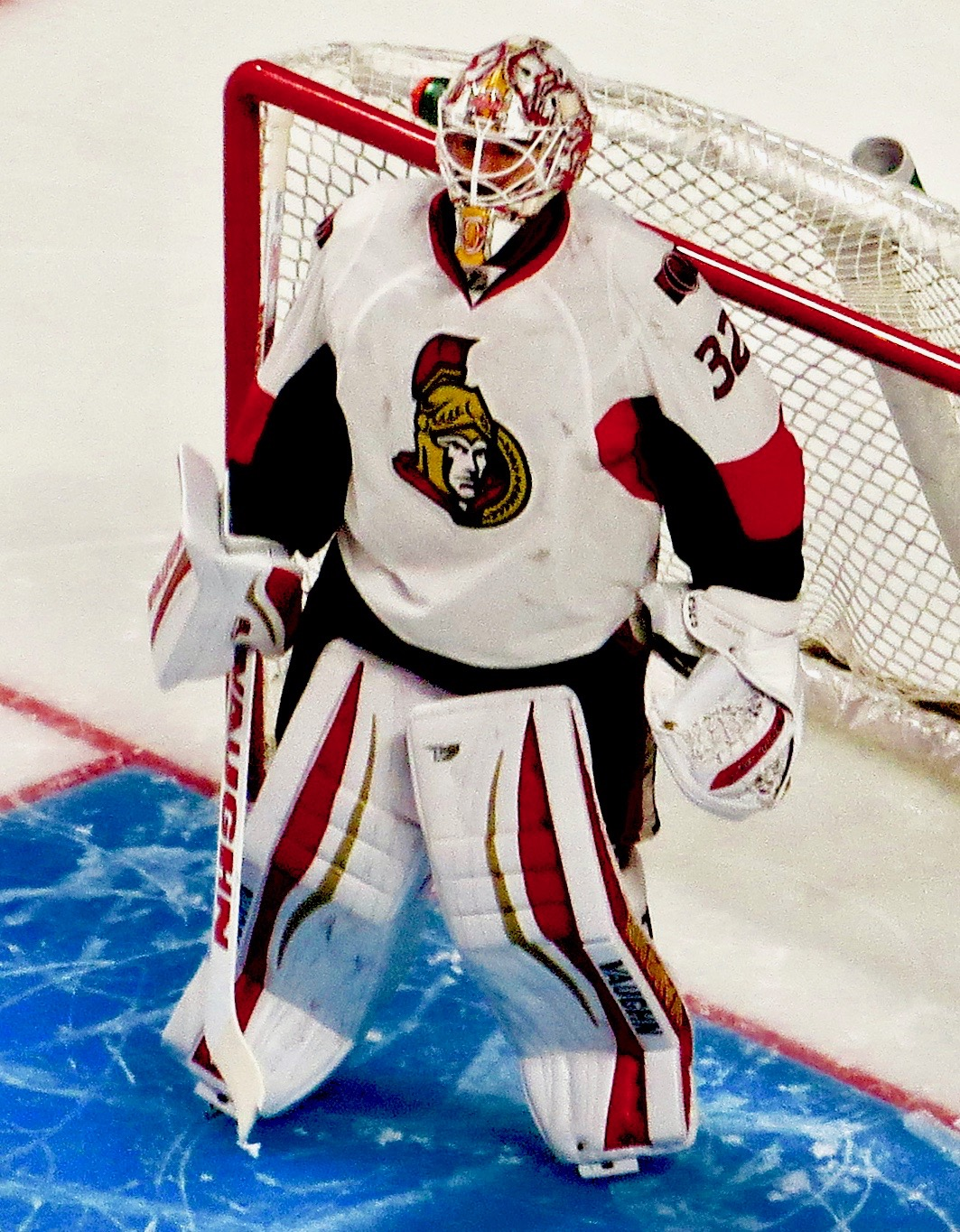
Dreidger with the Senators in 2016

On April 1, 2014, the Ottawa Senators signed Driedger to a three-year, entry-level contract. On April 4, Driedger was sent down to the Senators' ECHL affiliate, the Elmira Jackals, where he played in his first professional game, making 30 saves in a 5–1 win over the Orlando Solar Bears. Driedger would end up playing four games for the Jackals, totaling 199 minutes of play and 109 saves. After the end of the ECHL season, Driedger was called up to the American Hockey League (AHL), where he joined the Binghamton Senators for one game on April 19. After starting goalie Scott Greenham left the game at 33:49, Driedger replaced him, stopping 20 of 22 shots as part of a 4–2 win over the Norfolk Admirals in his AHL debut.

For the 2014–15 season, the Senators changed ECHL affiliates, switching to the Evansville IceMen. On November 19, 2014, Driedger recorded his first professional shutout in a 3–0 win over the Greenville Road Warriors. On November 29, Driedger recorded another shutout in a 1–0 win against his former team, the Jackals. Driedger became the first IceMen player to earn a call-up to the NHL after he stopped 38 of 41 shots in a win against the South Carolina Stingrays on February 15, 2015. On March 26, Driedger made his NHL debut with Ottawa, entering a game against the New York Rangers. After Andrew Hammond let in five goals on 22 shots, Driedger was put in net, notching ten saves. Driedger ended his season with the IceMen with eight wins in 40 games played, with a 3.78 GAA and a .885 save percentage. With the Binghamton Senators that season, Driedger went 6–0–0 in eight games played, achieving a 2.55 GAA and a .923 save percentage. Driedger was named to the Binghamton Senators' opening night roster for the 2015–16 season. Due to injuries to Andrew Hammond and Matt O'Connor, Driedger was called up to the NHL, where, on December 12, 2015, Driedger played part of a game against the Montreal Canadiens. In an April 1, 2015, game against the Syracuse Crunch, Driedger stopped 39 shots as part of a 3–2 victory. Dredger ended the season with an 18–15–4 record, a 2.83 GAA, and a .912 save percentage.

Driedger recorded a shutout on October 15, 2016, the opening night of the 2016–17 season, making 25 saves in a 3–0 win over the Hershey Bears. On October 28, Driedger was put into a game against the Calgary Flames after starting goaltender Andrew Hammond received a lower-body injury in the first period. Driedger let up four goals on 15 shots as part of a 5–2 loss. On December 17 and 18, Driedger started in games for the Wichita Thunder, the Senators' new ECHL affiliate. On April 12, 2017, Driedger made 46 saves on 48 shots in a 3–2 shootout win over the Rochester Americans. For the 2017–18 season, the Binghamton Senators were renamed to the Belleville Senators, and Driedger was once again named to the opening night roster. He played 10 games with the Senators that season, managing a 2–5–0 record and a 4.04 GAA and a .885 save percentage. That season, the Senators' ECHL affiliate was the Brampton Beast, with whom Driedger went 9–7–1, and achieved a 2.55 GAA and a .922 save percentage.

==== Florida Panthers ====
On July 3, 2018, Driedger agreed to a one-year AHL contract with the Springfield Thunderbirds, the AHL affiliate to the Florida Panthers. During the 2018–19 season, Driedger initially split his time between the Thunderbirds and Manchester Monarchs of the ECHL, before solidifying his role in the AHL. On January 19, 2019, he made 40 saves in a 3–0 shutout win over the Hartford Wolf Pack. Driedger made 16 appearances with Springfield before he was signed to an entry-level contract with the Florida Panthers for the remainder of the season on February 24, 2019. Driedger ended his season with the Thunderbirds with an 18–10–2 record, a 2.45 GAA, and a league-leading .924 save percentage. With the Monarchs, he went 6–5–0, notching a 2.75 GAA and a .911 save percentage. On April 30, 2019, Driedger signed a two-year contract extension with the Panthers.

Towards the beginning of the 2019–20 season, on November 30, 2019, Driedger made his first career start against the Nashville Predators, in which he recorded 27 saves in a 3–0 shutout win. In the AHL, Driedger represented the Thunderbirds at the AHL All-Star Classic. By the end of the season, Driedger had started 11 games in the NHL, going 7–2–1, maintaining a 2.05 GAA and a .938 save percentage. With the Thunderbirds, he went 6–9–0, with a 2.30 GAA and a .932 save percentage. Driedger became the Panthers' full-time backup goaltender to Sergei Bobrovsky for 2020–21 after the departure of previous backup Sam Montembeault. In his 23 starts throughout the season, a personal record up to that point, Driedger led the Panthers' goaltending corps, with a 2.07 GAA, .927 save percentage, and three shutouts. On May 18, 2021, in Game 2 of Round 1, Driedger made his first NHL playoff start, recording 26 saves in a 3–1 loss to the Tampa Bay Lightning. In Game 3, Driedger started in goal, but after letting in five goals on 22 shots, he was replaced by Bobrovsky for the third period, in what would be a 6–5 overtime victory. Bobrovsky started Game 4, but after letting in five goals on 14 shots, he was pulled in favor of Driedger during the third period, where he would make 11 saves in what would end up as a 6–2 loss.

==== Seattle Kraken ====
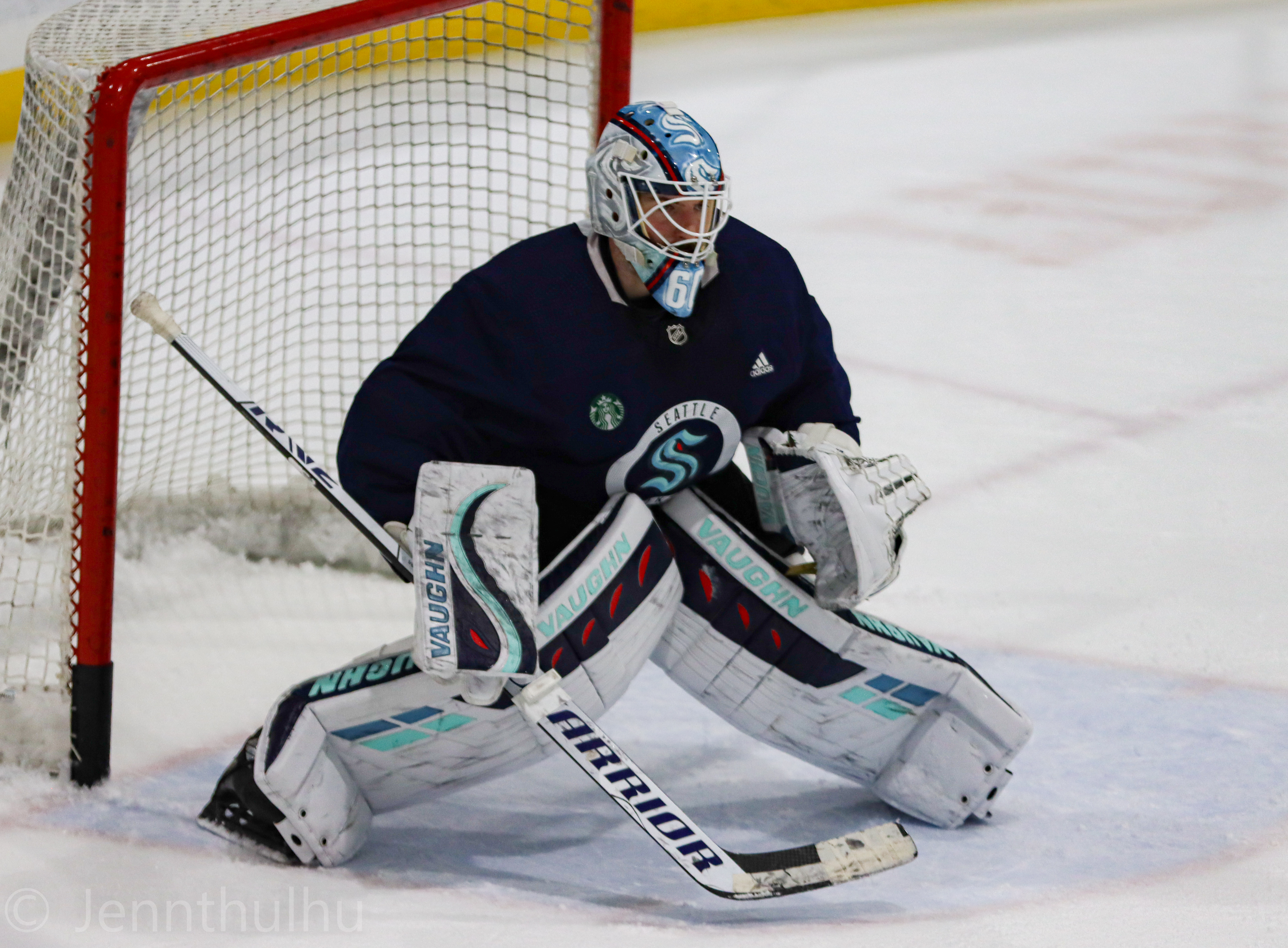
Driedger practicing with the Kraken during their inaugural season

On July 19, 2021, a three-day exclusive free agent signing period for the NHL's 2021 expansion team, the Seattle Kraken, began. The Kraken utilized this period by signing Chris Driedger to a three-year, US$10,500,000 contract on July 21. Later that day, Driedger counted as the Kraken's pick in the 2021 NHL expansion draft from the Panthers. Although initially expected to be the Kraken's starting goaltender, the signing of Philipp Grubauer to a long-term deal again relegated Driedger to a backup role. On October 12, The Players' Tribune published a piece by Driedger explaining his career path and gratitude to the Kraken for giving him another chance at the NHL, as well as gratitude to Kraken fans for their patience and excitement.

In his first season with the Kraken, Driedger was often sidelined due to injury issues. His first injury came after relieving Grubauer in a 6–1 loss to the Philadelphia Flyers on October 18. He missed numerous games, needing to work in solo sessions with goaltender coach Andrew Allen, before rejoining the team on November 2. Driedger made his first start with the Kraken on November 9, in a 4–2 loss to the Vegas Golden Knights. However, he was reinjured later that month following a 7–4 win over the Buffalo Sabres on November 29 and missed numerous games to recover. Driedger recorded his first shutout with the Kraken on April 29, 2022, making saves in a 3–0 victory over the San Jose Sharks. He ended his first season with the Kraken with a 9–14–1 record, a 2.96 GAA, and a .899 save percentage.

During the off-season, Driedger suffered an injury playing with Team Canada at the 2022 IIHF World Championship. The injury put him out of playing for 7–9 months. When Driedger returned from injury on February 23, 2023, he was put on waivers for the purpose of being sent to the Coachella Valley Firebirds of the AHL. Driedger played his first game with the Firebirds on February 27, stopping 30 of 33 shots in a 4–3 overtime win over the San Jose Barracuda. He recorded his first shutout with the Firebirds on March 31, making 25 saves as part of a 4–0 victory over the Ontario Reign. Driedger would end the season making 14 appearances with the Firebirds, posting a 9–4–0 record with a 2.61 GAA and a .908 save percentage.

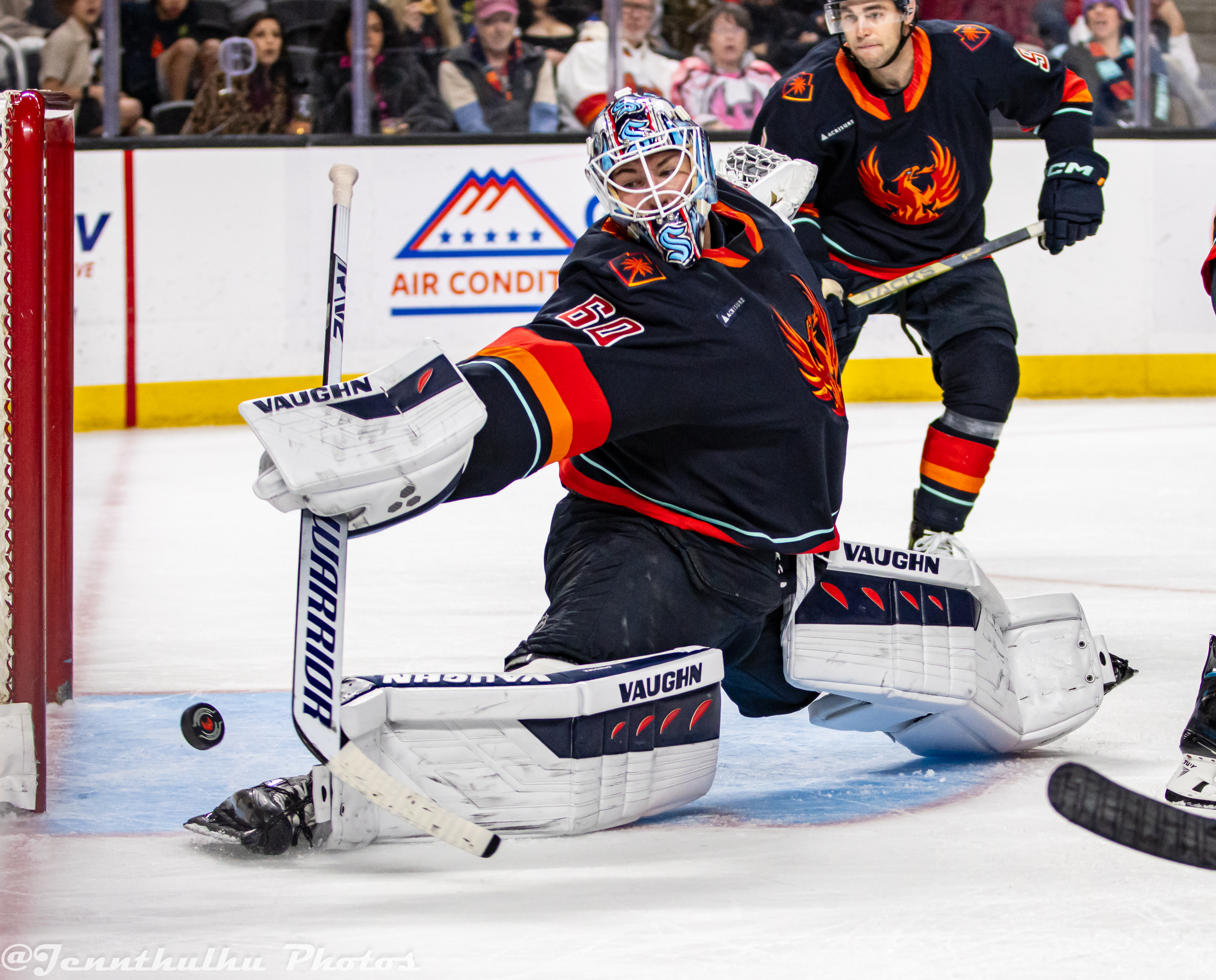
Driedger with the Firebirds in 2024

Driedger played his first game back with the Kraken on December 27, 2023, where he made 37 saves to lead the Kraken to a 2–1 win over the Calgary Flames. Driedger played one more game with the Kraken that season, a 5–2 loss to the New York Rangers on January 16, 2024. During spent most of his time during the season with the Firebirds, where he went 24–7–7 and registered a 2.26 GAA and a .917 save percentage. Driedger played his first playoff game with the Firebirds on May 3, making 23 saves on 25 shots in a 4–1 loss to the Calgary Wranglers. His first playoff shutout would come three games later on May 10, recording 31 saves in a 3–0 victory, helping the Firebirds clinch the series. Driedger helped the Firebirds reach the Calder Cup Finals for the second straight year, losing in Game 6 to the Hershey Bears. Driedger ended the playoffs with a 12–6 record, a 2.67 GAA, and a .906 save percentage.

==== Return to Florida and Winnipeg Jets ====
As a free agent at the conclusion of his contract with the Kraken, Driedger opted to return to the Florida Panthers. Driedger signed a one-year, US$795,000 contract on July 1, 2024. At the end of training camp, Driedger was part of the opening day roster, along with Sergei Bobrovsky. However, on October 9, Driedger was assigned to the Charlotte Checkers of the AHL. Driedger's first game with Charlotte came in their season opener on October 12, where he made 31 saves as part of a 7–6 win over the Wilkes-Barre/Scranton Penguins. Driedger would play 20 games with Charlotte, going 10–6–4 with a 2.97 GAA and a .878 save percentage.

On March 6, 2025, Driedger was traded to his hometown Winnipeg Jets in exchange for Kaapo Kahkonen. The Jets announced that Driedger would be assigned to their AHL affiliate, the Manitoba Moose. Driedger played his first game with Manitoba on March 9, stopping 26 shots in a 3–2 loss to the Calgary Wranglers. In five games with Manitoba, Driedger went 1–3–0, recording a 3.30 GAA and a .872 save percentage.

==== Traktor Chelyabinsk ====
On June 17, 2025, Driedger signed a one-year contract to play for Traktor Chelyabinsk in the Kontinental Hockey League. Driedger recorded his first shutout with the team on September 18, making 33 saves in a victory over Avtomobilist Yekaterinburg. Through 23 games with the team, Driedger achieved a 3.05 GAA and a .897 save percentage. On November 23, Driedger and the team mutually terminated his contract.

=== Vancouver Canucks ===
On August 27, 2026, Driedger was signed to a professional tryout (PTO).

== International play ==
Medal record

Representing Canada

Ice hockey

World Championships
Silver medal – second place	2022 Finland	

In 2011, Driedger was selected to play for Canada West at the 2011 World U-17 Hockey Challenge. In four games at the tournament, Driedger managed a 3.26 goals against average and a .880 save percentage.

Driedger joined Team Canada for the 2022 IIHF World Championship. He took over as the starting goaltender after an injury to the team's original starter, Logan Thompson. He was himself injured midway through the final against Team Finland, where Canada ultimately lost 4–3 in overtime, earning them the silver medal. It was subsequently announced that Driedger had suffered a torn ACL and that, as a result, he would miss 7–9 months of playing time in the 2022–23 season. Driedger played six games at the tournament, ending with a 4–2 record, with a 1.76 GAA and a .915 save percentage.

== Career statistics ==
=== Regular season and playoffs ===
			Regular season									Playoffs
Season	Team	League	GP	W	L	T/OT	MIN	GA	SO	GAA	SV%	GP	W	L	MIN	GA	SO	GAA	SV%
2010–11	Tri-City Americans	WHL	22	6	6	1	977	57	0	3.50	.881	—	—	—	—	—	—	—	—
2011–12	Calgary Hitmen	WHL	44	24	12	3	2294	107	3	2.80	.896	2	0	2	82	9	0	6.59	.812
2012–13	Calgary Hitmen	WHL	54	36	14	4	3199	134	2	2.51	.915	17	11	6	1006	40	1	2.39	.931
2013–14	Calgary Hitmen	WHL	50	28	14	7	2892	127	3	2.64	.918	6	2	3	328	24	1	4.39	.870
2013–14	Elmira Jackals	ECHL	4	1	2	0	199	13	0	3.92	.893	—	—	—	—	—	—	—	—
2013–14	Binghamton Senators	AHL	1	0	0	0	26	2	0	4.58	.909	—	—	—	—	—	—	—	—
2014–15	Evansville IceMen	ECHL	40	8	27	4	2253	142	2	3.78	.885	—	—	—	—	—	—	—	—
2014–15	Binghamton Senators	AHL	8	6	0	0	401	17	0	2.55	.923	—	—	—	—	—	—	—	—
2014–15	Ottawa Senators	NHL	1	0	0	0	23	0	0	0.00	1.000	—	—	—	—	—	—	—	—
2015–16	Binghamton Senators	AHL	39	18	15	4	2228	105	1	2.83	.912	—	—	—	—	—	—	—	—
2015–16	Ottawa Senators	NHL	1	0	0	0	32	0	0	0.00	1.000	—	—	—	—	—	—	—	—
2016–17	Binghamton Senators	AHL	34	12	19	2	1918	103	1	3.22	.900	—	—	—	—	—	—	—	—
2016–17	Ottawa Senators	NHL	1	0	1	0	40	4	0	6.00	.733	—	—	—	—	—	—	—	—
2016–17	Wichita Thunder	ECHL	2	0	2	0	120	9	0	4.51	.877	—	—	—	—	—	—	—	—
2017–18	Belleville Senators	AHL	10	2	5	0	490	33	0	4.04	.885	—	—	—	—	—	—	—	—
2017–18	Brampton Beast	ECHL	17	9	7	1	1014	43	0	2.55	.922	—	—	—	—	—	—	—	—
2018–19	Springfield Thunderbirds	AHL	32	18	10	2	1835	75	1	2.45	.924	—	—	—	—	—	—	—	—
2018–19	Manchester Monarchs	ECHL	12	6	5	0	676	31	0	2.75	.911	—	—	—	—	—	—	—	—
2019–20	Springfield Thunderbirds	AHL	15	6	9	0	891	34	0	2.29	.932	—	—	—	—	—	—	—	—
2019–20	Florida Panthers	NHL	12	7	2	1	643	22	1	2.05	.938	—	—	—	—	—	—	—	—
2020–21	Florida Panthers	NHL	23	14	6	3	1362	47	3	2.07	.927	3	0	1	130	8	0	3.70	.871
2021–22	Seattle Kraken	NHL	27	9	14	1	1479	73	1	2.96	.899	—	—	—	—	—	—	—	—
2022–23	Coachella Valley Firebirds	AHL	14	9	4	0	805	35	1	2.61	.908	—	—	—	—	—	—	—	—
2023–24	Coachella Valley Firebirds	AHL	39	24	7	7	2283	86	4	2.26	.917	18	12	6	1081	48	1	2.67	.906
2023–24	Seattle Kraken	NHL	2	1	1	0	119	5	0	2.51	.917	—	—	—	—	—	—	—	—
2024–25	Charlotte Checkers	AHL	20	10	6	4	1213	60	0	2.97	.878	—	—	—	—	—	—	—	—
2024–25	Manitoba Moose	AHL	5	1	3	0	273	15	0	3.30	.872	—	—	—	—	—	—	—	—
2025–26	Traktor Chelyabinsk	KHL	23	8	9	2	1200	61	1	3.05	.897	—	—	—	—	—	—	—	—
NHL totals			67	31	24	5	3,697	151	5	2.45	.917	3	0	1	130	8	0	3.70	.871
KHL totals			23	8	9	2	1,200	61	1	3.05	.897	—	—	—	—	—	—	—	—

=== International ===
Year	Team	Event	Result	GP	W	L	OT	MIN	GA	SO	GAA	SV%
2011	Canada West	U17	6th	4	1	3	0	—	—	0	3.26	.880
2022	Canada	WC	2nd place, silver medalist(s)	6	4	2	0	342	10	0	1.76	.915
Junior totals				4	1	3	0	—	—	0	3.26	.880
Senior totals				6	4	2	0	342	10	0	1.76	.915

== Awards and honours ==
Award	Year
CHL
CHL/NHL Top Prospects Game	2012
AHL
All-Star Classic	2020
