= Independent =

Independent or Independents may refer to:

== Arts, entertainment, and media ==
=== Artist groups ===
- Independents (artist group), a group of modernist painters based in Pennsylvania, US
- Independentes (English: Independents), a Portuguese artist group

=== Music ===
==== Groups, labels, and genres ====
- Independent music, a number of genres associated with independent labels
- Independent record label, a record label not associated with a major label
- Independent Albums, American albums chart

==== Albums ====
- Independent (Ai album), 2012
- Independent (Faze album), 2006
- Independent (Sacred Reich album), 1993

==== Songs ====
- "Independent" (song), 2007, by Webbie
- "Independent", 2002, by Ayumi Hamasaki from H

=== News media organizations ===
- Independent Media Center (also known as Indymedia or IMC), an open publishing network of journalist collectives that report on political and social issues, e.g., in The Indypendent newspaper of NYC
- ITV (TV network) (Independent Television), a British television channel
- Independent Television (Bangladesh), A Bangladeshi news broadcaster

=== Newspapers ===
- Grand Island Independent, published in Grand Island, Nebraska
- The Independent, a British online newspaper
- Independent (Nigeria), a daily newspaper published in Lagos
- The IndependentRI (South County Newspapers), covering South Kingstown, North Kingstown, Narragansett and The University of Rhode Island
- Independent News & Media, a print publisher in South Africa, owner of Independent Online (South Africa) until 2013
  - Independent Online, a news and information website based in South Africa, owned by Sekunjalo Investments since 2013
- Independentea, (literally 'The Independent') a Basque online daily newspaper
- Indy Week, formerly known as the Independent Weekly and originally the North Carolina Independent
- The Indypendent, a newspaper of the New York City Independent Media Center
- Irish Independent
- Long Beach Independent, a morning edition newspaper published in Long Beach, California
- The Malta Independent, a Maltese newspaper and online newspaper
- Marshall Independent, a daily newspaper published in Marshall, Minnesota
- Santa Barbara Independent, a news, arts, and alternative newspaper published every Thursday in Santa Barbara, California, US
- San Francisco Independent, formerly the largest non-daily American newspaper

=== Other uses in arts, entertainment, and media ===
- Independents (film), a 2008 American documentary
- Independent: A Look Inside a Broken White House, Outside the Party Lines, a book by Karine Jean-Pierre
- Independent bookstore, bookstore that is not part of a chain
- Independent film, film produced by a small movie studio
- Independent media, media that is free of influence by government or corporate interests
- Independent publisher, small press not associated with a major publisher
- Independent radio, radio stations independent of government or conglomerate interference
- Independent sources, in journalism, two or more sources which attest to a given piece of information
- Independent station, television or radio station that is not affiliated with any network

== Mathematics and statistics ==
- Dependent and independent variables, the argument of a mathematical function
- Independent, in Independence (probability theory), a variable whose occurrence does not affect the probability of occurrence of another
- Independence (mathematical logic), unprovability of a sentence (e.g. the Parallel postulate) from other sentences (e.g. the remaining Euclidean geometry axioms)

== Military ==
- Independent Company, a World War II British unit
- Independent Highland Companies, units of Scottish Highlanders in the 17th and 18th centuries
- Independent Illinois Volunteer Cavalry Companies of the American Civil War
- Norwegian Independent Company 1, a World War II Norwegian unit
- British Army Independent Companies of Foot, British units in the French and Indian Wars
- Vickers A1E1 Independent, British multi-turreted tank designed during the Interwar period

== Politics ==
- Independent city, city that does not form part of another local government entity
- Independent politician, not affiliated with any political party
- Independent voter, not a member of any political party
- Independent voting movement (U.S.), not affiliated with any political party
- Independents (political party), in the Czech Republic

== Religion ==
- Independent (religion), name for supporters of a disestablished Protestant church during the English Civil War, closely identified with support for the English Commonwealth, of which Oliver Cromwell is best known
- Independent church, or non-denominational church, a church unaffiliated with a denominational organization
- Union of Welsh Independents, Congregationalist denomination in Wales

== Sports ==
- Independent baseball league, in North America, a league not affiliated with Major League Baseball
- Independent circuit, professional wrestling shows not associated with the major wrestling promotions

In American college sports, schools that are not members of an NCAA or NAIA athletic conference, including:

- NCAA Division I FBS independent schools, for football
- NCAA Division I FCS independent schools, for football
- NCAA Division I independent schools (baseball)
- NCAA Division I independent schools (basketball)
- NCAA Division I independent schools (ice hockey)
- NCAA Division I independent schools (soccer)
- NCAA Division I independent schools, in general
- NCAA Division II independent schools, for all sports
- NCAA Division III independent schools, for all sports
- NCAA independent schools (lacrosse), for all divisions
- NAIA independent schools, for all sports

== Other uses ==
- Independent Institute, an American libertarian think tank
- Dependent and independent verb forms in Goidelic languages
- Independent business, privately owned companies
- Independent clothes store, boutique not associated with the larger retailers
- Independent contractor, organisation or individual which provides goods or services under terms specified in a contract
- Independent school, school which is not dependent upon national or local government for financing its operation
- Independent Truck Company, an American skateboarding brand

== See also ==
- Independence (disambiguation)
- Independent Township (disambiguation)
- Independente (disambiguation)
- Indie (disambiguation)
- Independent music, artistic creations outside the commercial mainstream
  - Alternative comics
  - Indie game, video games that are created independently of the financial backing of a large publishing company
- Systems theory
- L'Indépendant (disambiguation)
- The Independent (disambiguation)
- The Independents (disambiguation)
- Third-party source
