= Kote Camacho =

Basque filmmaker (born 1980)

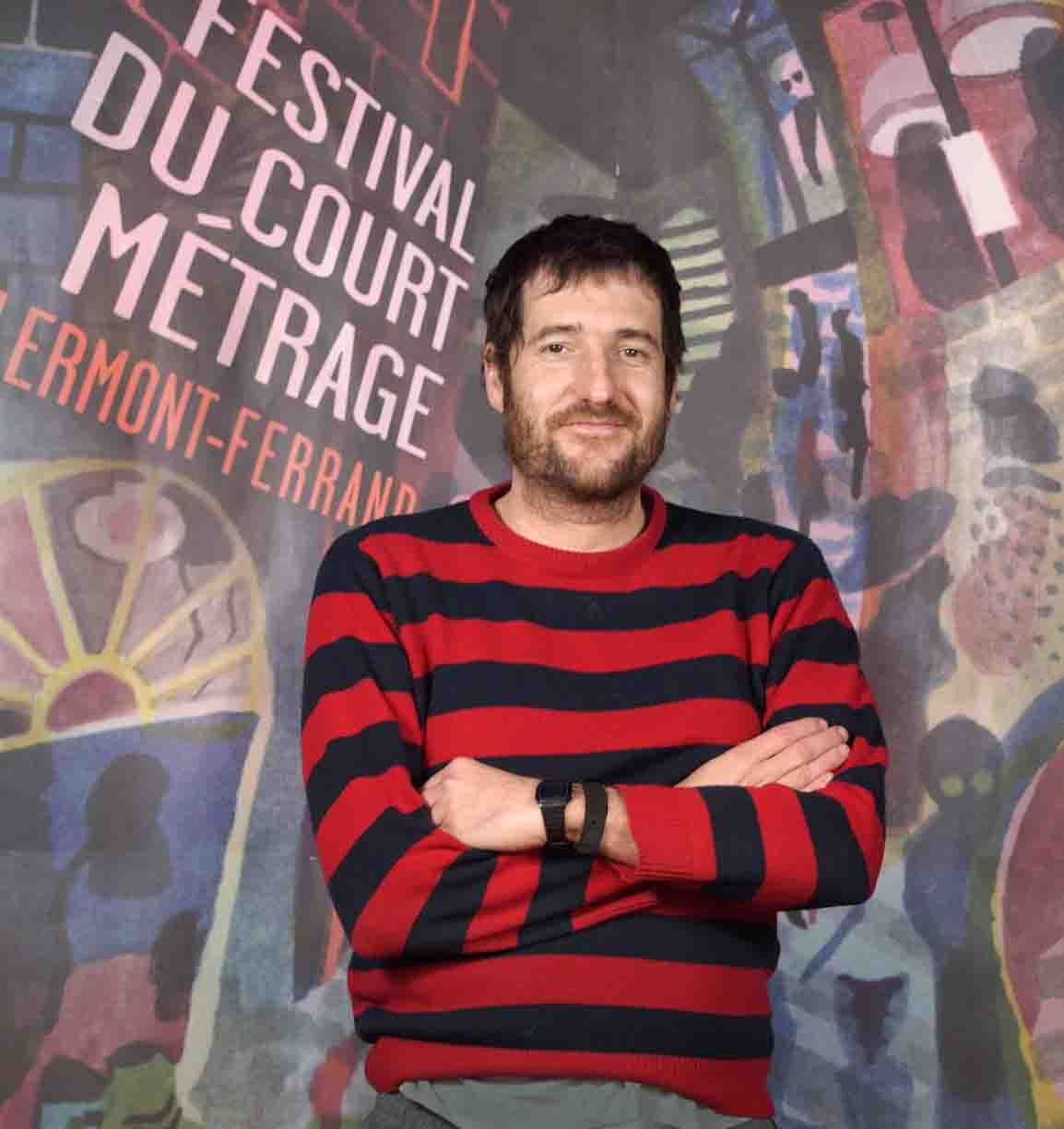
- Kote Camacho, Film Director's Retrospective in Clermont Ferrand, February 2022
- Born: 14 June 1980 (age 46); Oiartzun, Basque Country
- Education: University of the Basque Country
- Occupations: Film director, screenwriter, producer, editor, animator, storyboard and comic artist
- Years active: 1999–present

Kote Camacho (born 1980) is a Basque filmmaker, animator and comic and storyboard artist. Best known for directing La Gran Carrera (2010), a piece of dark humor with un unusual unfolding of a horse race, skillfully blending historical reconstructions and archival footage, nominated for Best Short Film at the European Film Awards.

== Biography ==
Kote was born in Oiartzun, Basque Country, in 1980. He drew comics for fanzine Napartheid and cartoons for local press while he studied Fine Arts at the University of the Basque Country.

He worked as a storyboard artist in DNA Films and other companies, for Julio Medem, Juan Carlos Fresnadillo, Max Lemcke and Alex Garland.

He wrote, directed, edited, animated and sound designed La Gran Carrera, what would be his first internationally acclaimed production. The film was nominated for the 24th European Film Awards and gathered 72 international awards. His second known film Elkartea went on to become the first Basque-language film ever selected at the Clermont-Ferrand Film Festival. In 2020, he created the Basque independent news outlet Independentea.eus.

Kote put together Komiki Films, a film and animation production company. He published his own comic: Txillardegi eta Monzon Bergaran, related to his documentary film Txillardegiren Klika about the Basque linguist Txillardegi, released in the 21st edition of Korrika, a major Basque cultural event.

Puzzleak, The Rape Palace is a short film he wrote and directed together with the woman behind its real story.

== Filmography ==
=== Written, Directed & Produced films ===
- La Gran Carrera ('The Great Race') (Txintxua Films, 2010)
- Elkartea ('The Society') (2013)
- Don Miguel (2014)
- Beti Bezperako Koplak (only co-directed, 2016)
- Areka ('The Ditch') (only co-directed, 2017)
- Txillardegiren Klika ('Txillardegi's click') (2019)
- Puzzleak, Bortxaketaren Jauregia (2024)

=== Animation ===
- Chaotic Ana (Julio Medem, 2007)
- Urzekzo Eraztuna (Jon Garaño, 2011)
- Nuestro viejo y el mar (Lander Camarero, 2017)
- Margolaria (Oier Aranzabal, 2018)
- Return of the Wolves (Thomas Horat, 2019)
- Priest Prison (Oier Aranzabal, Ritxi Lizartza, 2021)
- Matxitxako (Jesús Lacorte, 2022)
- Diciassette (Thomas Horat, 2023)
- Popel (Oier Plaza, 2025)

=== Storyboard ===
- Caótica Ana (Julio Medem, 2007)
- Casual Day (Max Lemcke, 2007)
- 28 weeks later (Juan Carlos Fresnadillo, 2008)
- The Green Man (Alex Garland)
- Gartxot (Asisko Urmeneta, Juanjo Elordi, 2011)
- A Escondidas (Mikel Rueda, 2014)
- Popel (Oier Plaza, 2025)

== Comic ==
=== Written & drawn ===
- Txillardegi eta Monzon Bergaran (Komiki Films, 2025)
- Hona Bostekoa! / Txillardegi Bergaran (Udalbiltza, 2023)
- Zitroi Ur Komikiak - Gaueko Encontrua / Joseba Sarrionandia Komikitan (Txalaparta / 2002)
