= L'Indépendant =

L'Indépendant may refer to:

- L'Indépendant (Luxembourg), Luxembourgish newspaper
- L'Indépendant (Mali), Malian newspaper; see Media of Mali
- L'Indépendant (Pyrénées-Orientales), French newspaper from the Pyrénées-Orientales department

== See also ==
- Independent (disambiguation)
