= 2018–19 Arizona State Sun Devils men's ice hockey season =

- Conference: Independent
- Home ice: Oceanside Ice Arena; Gila River Arena

Rankings
- USCHO.com: 15
- USA Today/ US Hockey Magazine: 15

Record
- Overall: 21–13–1
- Home: 13–4–1
- Road: 8–8–0
- Neutral: 0–1–0

Coaches and captains
- Head coach: Greg Powers
- Assistant coaches: Mike Field; Alex Hicks
- Captain(s): Tyler Busch; Brinson Pasichnuk
- Alternate captain(s): Anthony Croston; Dominic Garcia

The 2018–19 Arizona State Sun Devils men's ice hockey season was the 4th season of play for the program at the Division I level. The Sun Devils represented Arizona State University and were coached by Greg Powers, in his 9th season.

== Season ==
For the program's fourth year as a varsity squad, the Sun Devils produced their first winning record. The team also was ranked by both national polls for the first time and made its first ever NCAA Tournament appearance. Goaltender Joey Daccord became the first Sun Devil ever selected as an AHCA All-American. After Arizona State had finished its season, Daccord also became the first alumni to appear in an NHL game after signing with the Ottawa Senators.

== Departures ==
| Player | Position | Nationality | Cause |
|---|---|---|---|
| Nicholas Gushue | Defenseman | United States | Retired |
| Gage Hough | Forward | United States | Graduation (Retired) |
| Joe Lappin | Forward | United States | Retired |
| Liam McGing | Forward | United States | Retired |
| David Norris | Forward | Canada | Graduation (Signed with Milton Keynes Lightning) |
| Ryland Pashovitz | Goaltender | Canada | Left Program |
| Joey Raats | Defenseman | United States | Signed Professional Contract (Utah Grizzlies) |

== Recruiting ==
| Player | Position | Nationality | Age | Notes |
|---|---|---|---|---|
| Evan Debrouwer | Goaltender | Canada | 21 | Blenheim, ON |
| Jarrod Gourley | Defenseman/Forward | Canada | 19 | Calgary, AB |
| Demetrios Koumontzis | Forward | United States | 18 | Scottsdale, AZ; selected 108th overall in the 2018 NHL entry draft |
| Josh Maniscalco | Defenseman | United States | 19 | Perkiomenville, PA |
| P. J. Marrocco | Forward | Canada | 21 | Edmonton, AB |
| Jordan Sandhu | Forward | Canada | 19 | Richmond, BC |
| Connor Stuart | Defenseman/Forward | United States | 21 | Phoenix, AZ |
| Peter Zhong | Forward | China | 20 | Beijing, CHN; Red shirt |

== Roster ==
As of March 20, 2019.

| No. | Nat. | Player | Class | Pos | Height | Weight | DoB | Hometown | Previous team | NHL rights |
|---|---|---|---|---|---|---|---|---|---|---|
| 2 | (United States) | Connor Stuart | Freshman | D | 6' 2" (1.88 m) | 190 lb (86 kg) | 1997-02-12 | Phoenix, Arizona | Lone Star Brahmas (NAHL) | — |
| 3 | (Latvia) | Gvido Jansons | Sophomore | D | 6' 4" (1.93 m) | 210 lb (95 kg) | 1997-01-09 | Grobiņa, Latvia | Aston Rebels (NAHL) | — |
| 4 | (United States) | Jacob Wilson | Sophomore | D | 5' 11" (1.8 m) | 185 lb (84 kg) | 1997-02-27 | Ballwin, Missouri | Sioux City Musketeers (USHL) | — |
| 7 | (United States) | Johnny Walker | Sophomore | F | 6' 1" (1.85 m) | 185 lb (84 kg) | 1996-08-21 | Phoenix, Arizona | Chicago Steel (USHL) | — |
| 10 | (Canada) | Tyler Busch (C) | Junior | F | 6' 3" (1.91 m) | 195 lb (88 kg) | 1996-01-03 | Lloydminster, Alberta | Spruce Grove Saints (AJHL) | — |
| 11 | (United States) | Jack Rowe | Senior | F | 6' 1" (1.85 m) | 185 lb (84 kg) | 1994-04-07 | Cary, Illinois | Des Moines Buccaneers (USPHL) | — |
| 12 | (Canada) | Dylan Hollman | Senior (RS) | F | 6' 1" (1.85 m) | 185 lb (84 kg) | 1994-01-15 | Red Deer, Alberta | Massachusetts–Lowell (HEA) | — |
| 16 | (United States) | Austin Lemieux | Freshman (RS) | F | 6' 3" (1.91 m) | 170 lb (77 kg) | 1996-03-24 | Sewickley, Pennsylvania | Islanders Hockey Club (USPHL) | — |
| 18 | (United States) | Anthony Croston (A) | Senior | F | 6' 0" (1.83 m) | 183 lb (83 kg) | 1994-06-13 | Phoenix, Arizona | Rio Grande Valley Killer Bees (NAHL) | — |
| 19 | (Canada) | Jordan Sandhu | Freshman | F | 5' 7" (1.7 m) | 155 lb (70 kg) | 1999-05-13 | Richmond, British Columbia | Vernon Vipers (BCHL) | — |
| 20 | (Latvia) | Filips Buncis | Sophomore | F | 6' 4" (1.93 m) | 210 lb (95 kg) | 1997-06-12 | Jelgava, Latvia | Johnstown Tomahawks (NAHL) | — |
| 22 | (United States) | Jake Clifford | Senior | D | 6' 1" (1.85 m) | 185 lb (84 kg) | 1994-12-08 | Brecksville, Ohio | Merritt Centennials (BCHL) | — |
| 23 | (United States) | Demetrios Koumontzis | Freshman | F | 5' 10" (1.78 m) | 180 lb (82 kg) | 2000-03-24 | Scottsdale, Arizona | Edina High School (USHS–MN) | CGY, 108th overall 2018 |
| 24 | (United States) | Joshua Maniscalco | Freshman | D | 6' 2" (1.88 m) | 205 lb (93 kg) | 1999-02-17 | Perkiomenville, Pennsylvania | Dubuque Fighting Saints (USHL) | — |
| 25 | (Canada) | P.J. Marrocco | Freshman | F | 5' 8" (1.73 m) | 165 lb (75 kg) | 1997-08-27 | Edmonton, Alberta | Chilliwack Chiefs (BCHL) | — |
| 26 | (Canada) | Max Balinson | Sophomore | D | 6' 0" (1.83 m) | 185 lb (84 kg) | 1996-10-05 | Ancaster, Ontario | Burlington Cougars (OJHL) | — |
| 27 | (United States) | Brett Gruber | Junior | F | 5' 8" (1.73 m) | 180 lb (82 kg) | 1996-01-18 | Appleton, Wisconsin | Green Bay Gamblers (USHL) | — |
| 28 | (Canada) | Steenn Pasichnuk | Junior | F | 6' 4" (1.93 m) | 219 lb (99 kg) | 1995-04-05 | Bonnyville, Alberta | Bonnyville Pontiacs (AJHL) | — |
| 29 | (Sweden) | Jakob Stridsberg | Junior | D | 6' 0" (1.83 m) | 184 lb (83 kg) | 1995-01-13 | Jönköping, Sweden | Fairbanks Ice Dogs (NAHL) | — |
| 30 | (Canada) | Evan DeBrouwer | Freshman | G | 6' 3" (1.91 m) | 190 lb (86 kg) | 1997-01-30 | Blenheim, Ontario | Prince George Spruce Kings (BCHL) | — |
| 32 | (United States) | Louie Rowe | Junior (RS) | F | 6' 6" (1.98 m) | 198 lb (90 kg) | 1994-03-17 | East Lansing, Michigan | Omaha Lancers (USHL) | — |
| 35 | (United States) | Joey Daccord | Junior | G | 6' 2" (1.88 m) | 188 lb (85 kg) | 1996-08-19 | North Andover, Massachusetts | Muskegon Lumberjacks (USHL) | OTT, 199 overall 2015 |
| 37 | (United States) | Dominic Garcia (A) | Sophomore | F | 5' 11" (1.8 m) | 190 lb (86 kg) | 1996-10-30 | Las Vegas, Nevada | Aston Rebels (NAHL) | — |
| 39 | (Canada) | Brinson Pasichnuk (C) | Junior | D | 5' 10" (1.78 m) | 200 lb (91 kg) | 1997-11-24 | Bonnyville, Alberta | Bonnyville Pontiacs (AJHL) | — |
| 60 | (Canada) | Jarrod Gourley | Freshman | D | 6' 2" (1.88 m) | 207 lb (94 kg) | 1999-06-29 | Calgary, Alberta | Spruce Grove Saints (AJHL) | — |

== Standings ==
2018–19 NCAA Division I Independent ice hockey standings
| | Overall record | | | | | |
| | GP | W | L | T | GF | GA |
|---|---|---|---|---|---|---|
| #15 Arizona State | 35 | 21 | 13 | 1 | 109 | 86 |
Rankings: USCHO.com Top 20 Poll; Standing

== Schedule and results ==
| Date | Time | Opponent^{#} | Rank^{#} | Site | TV | Decision | Result | Attendance | Record |
Regular season
| October 6 | 7:05 PM | vs. Alaska* | | Oceanside Ice Arena • Tempe, Arizona | | Daccord | W 3–0 | 644 | 1–0–0 |
| October 7 | 3:00 PM | vs. Alaska* | | Oceanside Ice Arena • Tempe, Arizona | | Daccord | W 5–0 | 921 | 2–0–0 |
| October 12 | 7:05 PM | vs. #1 Ohio State* | | Oceanside Ice Arena • Tempe, Arizona | | Daccord | L 2–3 | 925 | 2–1–0 |
| October 13 | 7:05 PM | vs. #1 Ohio State* | | Oceanside Ice Arena • Tempe, Arizona | | Daccord | L 0–3 | 922 | 2–2–0 |
| October 19 | 6:07 PM | at Alabama–Huntsville* | | Von Braun Center • Huntsville, Alabama | | Daccord | W 2–1 | 2,138 | 3–2–0 |
| October 20 | 6:07 PM | at Alabama–Huntsville* | | Von Braun Center • Huntsville, Alabama | | Daccord | W 5–1 | 2,071 | 4–2–0 |
| October 26 | 7:05 PM | vs. Omaha* | | Oceanside Ice Arena • Tempe, Arizona | | Daccord | W 6–3 | 869 | 5–2–0 |
| October 27 | 7:05 PM | vs. Omaha* | | Oceanside Ice Arena • Tempe, Arizona | | Daccord | W 7–2 | 920 | 6–2–0 |
| November 2 | 5:07 PM | at #6 Penn State* | | Pegula Ice Arena • University Park, Pennsylvania | | Daccord | L 5–6 | 6,002 | 6–3–0 |
| November 3 | 6:07 PM | at #6 Penn State* | | Pegula Ice Arena • University Park, Pennsylvania | | Daccord | W 4–3 ^{OT} | 6,147 | 7–3–0 |
| November 9 | 7:05 PM | vs. Michigan State* | | Oceanside Ice Arena • Tempe, Arizona | | Daccord | W 5–4 | 923 | 8–3–0 |
| November 10 | 7:05 PM | vs. Michigan State* | | Oceanside Ice Arena • Tempe, Arizona | | Daccord | W 2–0 | 924 | 9–3–0 |
| November 16 | 5:00 PM | at Harvard* | #18 | Bright-Landry Hockey Center • Boston, Massachusetts | | Daccord | L 1–4 | 1,735 | 9–4–0 |
| November 17 | 5:00 PM | at Harvard* | #18 | Bright-Landry Hockey Center • Boston, Massachusetts | | Daccord | W 3–2 ^{OT} | 1,835 | 10–4–0 |
| November 23 | 6:07 PM | at Omaha* | #16 | Baxter Arena • Omaha, Nebraska | | Daccord | L 4–6 | 5,443 | 10–5–0 |
| November 24 | 6:07 PM | at Omaha* | #16 | Baxter Arena • Omaha, Nebraska | | Daccord | L 0–4 | 5,302 | 10–6–0 |
| December 7 | 5:00 PM | at Princeton* | #19 | Hobey Baker Memorial Rink • Princeton, New Jersey | | Daccord | W 4–0 | 1,505 | 11–6–0 |
| December 8 | 5:00 PM | at Princeton* | #19 | Hobey Baker Memorial Rink • Princeton, New Jersey | | Daccord | W 3–2 ^{OT} | 1,683 | 12–6–0 |
| December 14 | 7:05 PM | vs. Colorado College* | #15 | Oceanside Ice Arena • Tempe, Arizona | | Daccord | W 4–2 | 840 | 13–6–0 |
| December 15 | 7:05 PM | vs. Colorado College* | #15 | Oceanside Ice Arena • Tempe, Arizona | | Daccord | W 4–0 | 882 | 14–6–0 |
Desert Hockey Classic
| December 28 | 7:42 PM | vs. #19 Clarkson* | #15 | Gila River Arena • Glendale, Arizona (Desert Hockey Classic Semifinal) | Pac-12 Network | Daccord | L 0–3 | 4,062 | 14–7–0 |
| December 29 | 7:47 PM | vs. #3 Minnesota State* | #15 | Gila River Arena • Glendale, Arizona (Desert Hockey Classic Consolation) | | Daccord | T 2–2 ^{SOW} | 3,341 | 14–7–1 |
| January 4 | 7:05 PM | vs. Boston College* | #15 | Oceanside Ice Arena • Tempe, Arizona | | Daccord | W 5–2 | 921 | 15–7–1 |
| January 5 | 7:05 PM | vs. Boston College* | #15 | Oceanside Ice Arena • Tempe, Arizona | | Daccord | W 2–0 | 2,902 | 16–7–1 |
| January 11 | 5:03 PM | at #17 Cornell* | #13 | Lynah Rink • Ithaca, New York | | Daccord | L 1–6 | 2,426 | 16–8–1 |
| January 12 | 5:03 PM | at #17 Cornell* | #13 | Lynah Rink • Ithaca, New York | | Daccord | L 2–3 | 2,874 | 16–9–1 |
| January 25 | 5:35 PM | at Boston University* | #17 | Agganis Arena • Boston, Massachusetts | | Daccord | L 2–4 | 3,170 | 16–10–1 |
| January 26 | 5:05 PM | at Boston University* | #17 | Agganis Arena • Boston, Massachusetts | | Daccord | W 3–0 | 4,569 | 17–10–1 |
| February 1 | 5:05 PM | at RIT* | #16 | Gene Polisseni Center • Henrietta, New York | | Daccord | W 6–1 | 3,147 | 18–10–1 |
| February 2 | 5:05 PM | at RIT* | #16 | Gene Polisseni Center • Henrietta, New York | | Daccord | W 4–2 | 2,571 | 19–10–1 |
| February 15 | 7:05 PM | vs. American International* | #12 | Oceanside Ice Arena • Tempe, Arizona | | Daccord | W 4–1 | 924 | 20–10–1 |
| February 16 | 7:05 PM | vs. American International* | #12 | Oceanside Ice Arena • Tempe, Arizona | | Daccord | W 5–4 ^{OT} | 925 | 21–10–1 |
| March 1 | 6:05 PM | at Minnesota* | #12 | 3M Arena at Mariucci • Minneapolis, Minnesota | FSN | Daccord | L 1–5 | 7,921 | 21–11–1 |
| March 2 | 6:05 PM | at Minnesota* | #12 | 3M Arena at Mariucci • Minneapolis, Minnesota | FSN+ | Daccord | L 2–5 | 9,141 | 21–12–1 |
NCAA Tournament
| March 30 | 6:10 PM | vs. #8 Quinnipiac* | #14 | PPL Center • Allentown, Pennsylvania (NCAA Midwest Regional semifinal) | ESPN 3 | Daccord | L 1–2 | 3,763 | 21–13–1 |
*Non-conference game. ^{#}Rankings from USCHO.com Poll. All times are in Mountain Time.

== Scoring Statistics ==
| Name | Position | Games | Goals | Assists | Points | PIM |
|---|---|---|---|---|---|---|
| Johnny Walker | RW | 32 | 23 | 11 | 34 | 34 |
| Brinson Pasichnuk | D | 35 | 13 | 17 | 30 | 28 |
| Anthony Croston | F | 34 | 7 | 16 | 23 | 54 |
| Tyler Busch | C | 34 | 7 | 14 | 21 | 71 |
| Brett Gruber | C | 35 | 7 | 14 | 21 | 18 |
| Demetrios Koumontzis | LW | 35 | 4 | 16 | 20 | 36 |
| Josh Maniscalco | D | 35 | 4 | 16 | 20 | 22 |
| Dylan Hollman | LW | 35 | 12 | 7 | 19 | 8 |
| P. J. Marrocco | F | 35 | 7 | 7 | 14 | 10 |
| Jordan Sandhu | C | 35 | 3 | 11 | 14 | 4 |
| Austin Lemieux | RW | 31 | 4 | 9 | 13 | 12 |
| Filips Buncis | C | 33 | 5 | 5 | 10 | 6 |
| Jacob Wilson | D | 34 | 2 | 7 | 9 | 47 |
| Jarrod Gourley | D | 33 | 3 | 5 | 8 | 46 |
| Steenn Pasichnuk | RW | 33 | 2 | 6 | 8 | 33 |
| Dominic Garcia | F | 35 | 2 | 6 | 8 | 30 |
| Jake Clifford | D | 34 | 3 | 4 | 7 | 33 |
| Jakob Stridsberg | D | 26 | 0 | 4 | 4 | 14 |
| Gvido Jansons | D | 35 | 1 | 2 | 3 | 16 |
| Max Balinson | D | 15 | 0 | 2 | 2 | 2 |
| Joey Daccord | G | 35 | 0 | 1 | 1 | 0 |
| Evan Debrouwer | G | 1 | 0 | 0 | 0 | 0 |
| Jack Rowe | F | 3 | 0 | 0 | 0 | 0 |
| Connor Stuart | D/F | 3 | 0 | 0 | 0 | 0 |
| Louie Rowe | F | 5 | 0 | 0 | 0 | 0 |
| Bench | - | - | - | - | - | 6 |
| Total | | | 109 | 180 | 289 | 530 |

== Goaltending statistics ==
| Name | Games | Minutes | Wins | Losses | Ties | Goals against | Saves | Shut outs | SV % | GAA |
|---|---|---|---|---|---|---|---|---|---|---|
| Joey Daccord | 35 | 2091 | 21 | 13 | 1 | 82 | 1030 | 7 | .926 | 2.35 |
| Evan Debrouwer | 1 | 8 | 0 | 0 | 0 | 1 | 1 | 0 | .500 | 7.20 |
| Empty Net | - | 13 | - | - | - | 3 | - | - | - | - |
| Total | 35 | 2113 | 21 | 13 | 1 | 86 | 1031 | 7 | .923 | 2.44 |

== Rankings ==
| Poll | Week | | | | | | | | | | | | | | | | | | | | | | | | | | |
| Poll | Pre | 1 | 2 | 3 | 4 | 5 | 6 | 7 | 8 | 9 | 10 | 11 | 12 | 13 | 14 | 15 | 16 | 17 | 18 | 19 | 20 | 21 | 22 | 23 | 24 | 25 | 26 (Final) |
|---|---|---|---|---|---|---|---|---|---|---|---|---|---|---|---|---|---|---|---|---|---|---|---|---|---|---|---|
| USCHO.com | NR | NR | NR | NR | NR | NR | 18 | 16 | 18 | 19 | 15 | – | – | 13 | 17 | 17 | 16 | 12 | 12 | 11 | 12 | 13 | 13 | 14 | 14 | – | 15 |
| USA Today | NR | NR | NR | NR | NR | NR | NR | 14 | NR | 15 | 13 | 13 | 13 | 13 | NR | 15 | 15 | 11 | 12 | 10 | 11 | 12 | 13 | 13 | 13 | 15 | 15 |

*USCHO did not release a poll in weeks 11, 12 and 25.

== Awards and honors ==
=== NCAA ===
| Honor | Player | Position |
|---|---|---|
| All-American West Second Teams | Joey Daccord | Goaltender |

== Players drafted into the NHL ==
=== 2019 NHL entry draft ===
No Arizona State players were selected in the NHL draft.
