= Arizona State Sun Devils women's ice hockey =

Women's ice hockey team of Arizona State University

- University: Arizona State University
- Conference: Independent
- Head coach: Lindsey Ellis; 10th season, 123–95–7
- Assistant coaches: Brielle Fussy, Evan Hauser
- Captain(s): Breanne Powell, Taylor Bierlmeier
- Alternate captain(s): Kylie Brown, Mara Draper
- Arena: Mountain America Community Iceplex; Tempe, Arizona
- Colors: Maroon and Gold

ACHA tournament appearances
- 2023, 2024, 2025, 2026

Conference tournament champions
- 2023, 2024

Conference regular season champions
- 2022, 2023, 2024

The Arizona State Sun Devils women's ice hockey team represents Arizona State University (ASU) in American Collegiate Hockey Association (ACHA) women's Division I competition as an independent program. It plays most home games at Mountain America Community Iceplex in Tempe, with occasional games at Mullett Arena. ASU won three straight Western Women's Collegiate Hockey League (WWCHL) regular-season titles from 2021–22 to 2023–24 and the conference tournament in 2022–23 and 2023–24, and has played in four straight ACHA National Tournaments since 2023.

Lindsey Ellis has been the team's coach in each of the program's ten seasons, having grown up in nearby Peoria and coming back to Arizona to start the program after a successful career at Miami University that included an ACHA National Championship in 2014. Ellis, who is also the program's director of hockey operations, built the team around four values she calls CLAW: commitment, leadership, accountability and work ethic.

== History ==
=== 2016–17 ===
Arizona State announced women's club hockey in August 2015, with play beginning in fall 2016 at Oceanside Ice Arena, also home to the men's team. Head coach Lindsey Ellis, an Arizona native, had won the 2014 ACHA national title as a player at Miami University, the same season ASU's men won the Division I title. KC McGinley was the program's first captain, with Dannika Borges, Amber Galles and Taylor England as alternates.

ASU opened on October 7, 2016, with a 5-1 loss at Colorado; Erin Rawls scored the program's first goal. After an 0–12 start, the Sun Devils won for the first time on February 4, 5-3 over Denver, behind the program's first hat trick from Amber Galles. As WWCHL tournament host, ASU lost all three postseason games and finished 2–15, seventh in the eight-team conference.

=== 2017–18 ===
With 10 to 12 skaters a game, ASU improved to 8–15–1, then the program's best record. Goaltender Jordan Nash-Boulden played all 1,499 minutes with a .921 save percentage, and freshman Catherine Jones added 14 points. The Sun Devils tied and beat Grand Canyon in the first meetings with the new Lopes program and swept Colorado State for their first wins over the Rams. GCU's first win as a program came against ASU, a 1-0 shutout during a six-game skid, but ASU won twice at GCU in December, including a 3-0 win on December 8 that was the program's first shutout.

In February, ASU was ranked for the first time, No. 15 in the ACHA Women's Division 1 rankings. The season ended with losses to Lindenwood-Belleville and Midland at the WWCHL tournament at Sidner Ice Arena in Fremont, Nebraska. ASU's 7–10–1 conference record placed fifth of nine.

=== 2018–19 ===
A large recruiting class gave ASU its first full roster of 21 players. Ellis named four alternate captains, including goaltender Nash-Boulden and freshman Kat Jones. Jones recorded the program's second hat trick in an 8-1 win over Concordia Ann Arbor on October 25, and her shorthanded overtime goal beat Grand Canyon 1-0 on February 8. ASU also earned its first non-loss against Midland, a 4-4 tie, and was ranked as high as 12th.

As host of the WWCHL tournament at City National Arena in Las Vegas, ASU lost 3-1 to Colorado, beat GCU 4-0 for its first playoff win and fell 3-0 to Midland in the semifinals. The Sun Devils finished 10–12–1 overall and third in the WWCHL at 8–11–1.

=== 2019–20 ===
Kat Jones was named captain in October, with Molly Potter, Nash-Boulden and Danielle Dupont as alternates. ASU was ranked all season for the first time, between 12th and 13th. The Sun Devils opened with seven straight wins during a 12-game road stretch, including a 13-0 win over Concordia Ann Arbor, and beat Davenport and Michigan on the program's first trip to Michigan. ASU swept Utah in the Utes' first WWCHL season and went 5–0 against Grand Canyon for the first time.

At the WWCHL playoffs in Salt Lake City, ASU beat Colorado State 4-1 and Utah 3-1 to reach its first conference championship game, which Colorado won 5-1. The 17–5 season set program records for wins, winning percentage (.773), goals scored (95) and fewest goals allowed (37).

=== 2020–21 ===
Per university regulations, the 2020–21 season was canceled and the team did not play any ACHA games.

=== 2021–22 ===
Arizona State returned in 2021–22 and won its first WWCHL regular-season title, going 13–4–0 in conference play and 15–9–0 overall. ASU beat Air Force 26-0 on November 5, 2021, the largest margin of victory in program history. Freshman Sam Murphy scored a program-record five goals in a 21-0 win over Denver on January 22, 2022, and led ASU with 25 goals and 45 points, both still program single-season records. In the WWCHL tournament, the Sun Devils lost to Grand Canyon, beat Utah and reached the championship game, which Colorado won 1-0.

=== 2022–23 ===
The Sun Devils repeated as regular-season champions at 14–1–1, then won their first WWCHL tournament, beating Colorado State 6-0 and Grand Canyon twice, 3-1 and 5-1. They also played their first two games at the new Mullett Arena. ASU's 18–4–2 record and No. 7 final ranking, both program bests, earned its first ACHA National Tournament berth. At nationals, it lost to No. 6 Maryville 2-0 and No. 10 Miami 3-2.

=== 2023–24 ===
ASU went unbeaten in conference play (15–0–0) for a third straight regular-season title and won the WWCHL tournament again, beating Colorado State 7-0, Utah 3-0 and Colorado 6-2. Quinn Eatinger set program single-season records with 15 wins, nine shutouts and a .949 save percentage. Back at nationals, ASU lost to No. 3 Adrian 5-0, then beat No. 5 Maryville 3-2 in overtime for the program's first national tournament win before falling to top-ranked Liberty 3-2 in overtime. It was ASU's last season in the WWCHL.

=== 2024–25 ===
ASU left the WWCHL to play as an independent in 2024–25, giving Ellis control of the schedule so the team could play stronger opponents farther east. The Sun Devils went 15–9–0 and reached a third straight national tournament, where they lost pool-play games to Adrian 4-1 and McKendree 3-2 in overtime. Rookie Kylie Brown led the team with 17 goals and made the ACHA's First Team All-Rookie. ASU also went 4–0 against in-state rival Arizona.

=== 2025–26 ===
Murphy captained the team in her fifth season. In the fall, ASU made three road trips in a 32-day stretch, traveling 11,840 miles to play 10 games in five states. The Sun Devils climbed as high as No. 4 in the ACHA rankings and finished 14–9–1. Murphy ended her career as the program leader in games (110), goals (57), assists (73) and points (130), and Brown set the single-season record with nine power-play goals. ASU made its fourth straight national tournament but lost both pool-play games, to McKendree 2-0 and Maryville 5-0.

=== 2026–27 ===
The program added a second team, in ACHA Division II, for the 2026–27 season, coached by former ASU player Aubrey Beskid-Savage.

== Season-by-season results ==
Season	Overall				Conference			Postseason	
Season	Record	PCT	GF	GA	League	Record	Finish	Conference	ACHA
2016–17	2–15–0	.118	26	83	WWCHL	2–15–0	7th	Consolation	Did not qualify
2017–18	8–15–1	.354	45	80	WWCHL	7–10–1	5th	First round	Did not qualify
2018–19	10–12–1	.457	67	72	WWCHL	8–11–1	3rd	Semifinal	Did not qualify
2019–20	17–5–0	.773	95	37	WWCHL	10–2–0	2nd	Runner-up	Did not qualify
2020–21	Did Not Play (COVID-19)							N/A	
2021–22	15–9–0	.625	132	52	WWCHL	13–4–0	1st	Runner-up	Did not qualify
2022–23	18–4–2	.792	100	51	WWCHL	14–1–1	1st	Champion	First round
2023–24	21–3–1	.860	117	36	WWCHL	15–0–0	1st	Champion	Second round
2024–25	15–9–0	.625	84	52	Independent	N/A			Pool play
2025–26	14–9–1	.604	66	46	Independent	N/A			Pool play
2026–27	3–7–1	.318	20	34	Independent	N/A			In progress

== Schedule and results ==
Game-by-game results for each season since the program returned from the 2020–21 cancellation.

=== 2021–22 results ===
2021–22 schedule and results

Date	Time	Opponent^{#}	Rank^{#}	Site	Decision	Result	Record
Regular Season
October 8	5:30 pm MT	Grand Canyon University		Oceanside Ice Arena • Tempe, Arizona	McClelland	W 4-1	1-0-0-0 (1-0-0-0)
October 9	4:30 pm MT	Grand Canyon University		Oceanside Ice Arena • Tempe, Arizona	Hellman	W 5-3	2-0-0-0 (2-0-0-0)
October 22	7:10 pm MT	at University of Colorado		University of Colorado Boulder Recreation Center • Boulder, Colorado	McClelland	L 5-0	2-1-0-0 (2-1-0-0)
October 23	11:10 am MT	at University of Colorado		University of Colorado Boulder Recreation Center • Boulder, Colorado	McClelland	W 5-0	3-1-0-0 (3-1-0-0)
October 23	7:30 pm MT	at Colorado State University		Edora Pool Ice Center • Fort Collins, Colorado	Hellman	W 4-0	4-1-0-0 (4-1-0-0)
October 24	9:15 am MT	at Colorado State University		Edora Pool Ice Center • Fort Collins, Colorado	Hellman	W 6-0	5-1-0-0 (5-1-0-0)
October 29	7:30 pm CT	vs. Lindenwood University*		Jordan Valley Ice Park • Springfield, Missouri	McClelland	L 2-1	5-2-0-0
October 30	3:30 pm CT	vs. Maryville University*		Jordan Valley Ice Park • Springfield, Missouri	McClelland	W 6-2	6-2-0-0
October 31	1:00 pm CT	vs. Lindenwood University*		Jordan Valley Ice Park • Springfield, Missouri	McClelland	L 3-2	6-3-0-0
November 5	5:00 pm MT	United States Air Force Academy		Oceanside Ice Arena • Tempe, Arizona	Hellman	W 26-0	7-3-0-0 (6-1-0-0)
November 6	5:00 pm MT	United States Air Force Academy		Oceanside Ice Arena • Tempe, Arizona	Hellman	W 16-0	8-3-0-0 (7-1-0-0)
November 19	1:30 pm ET	at Liberty University*		LaHaye Ice Center • Lynchburg, Virginia	McClelland	L 11-0	8-4-0-0
November 20	1:30 pm ET	at Liberty University*		LaHaye Ice Center • Lynchburg, Virginia	McClelland	L 5-1	8-5-0-0
December 4	4:15 pm MT	at Grand Canyon University		AZ Ice Arcadia • Phoenix, Arizona	Hellman	W 5-3	9-5-0-0 (8-1-0-0)
December 5	12:47 pm MT	at Grand Canyon University		AZ Ice Arcadia • Phoenix, Arizona	McClelland	W 3-2 ^{OT}	10-5-0-0 (9-1-0-0)
January 7	8:00 pm MT	University of Massachusetts-Amherst*		Oceanside Ice Arena • Tempe, Arizona	Hellman	L 4-1	10-6-0-0
January 8	7:00 pm MT	University of Massachusetts-Amherst*		Oceanside Ice Arena • Tempe, Arizona	Hellman	W 3-2	11-6-0-0
January 22	11:16 am MT	University of Denver		Oceanside Ice Arena • Tempe, Arizona	Hellman	W 21-0	12-6-0-0 (10-1-0-0)
January 23	11:50 am MT	University of Denver		Oceanside Ice Arena • Tempe, Arizona	Hellman	W 14-1	13-6-0-0 (11-1-0-0)
February 4	4:30 pm MT	at University of Utah		Salt Lake City Sports Complex • Salt Lake City, Utah	Hellman	L 3-2	13-7-0-0 (11-2-0-0)
February 5	7:30 pm MT	at University of Utah		Salt Lake City Sports Complex • Salt Lake City, Utah	Hellman	W 1-0 ^{OT}	14-7-0-0 (12-2-0-0)
WWCHL Conference Tournament
February 18	12:30 pm MT	vs. Grand Canyon University		Oceanside Ice Arena • Tempe, Arizona	Hellman	L 4-1	14-8-0-0
February 19	12:30 pm MT	vs. University of Utah		Oceanside Ice Arena • Tempe, Arizona	Hellman	W 5-0	15-8-0-0
February 20	11:00 am MT	vs. University of Colorado		Oceanside Ice Arena • Tempe, Arizona	Hellman	L 1-0	15-9-0-0
*Non-conference game.

#Rankings from the ACHA Women's Division 1 rankings.

=== 2022–23 results ===
2022–23 schedule and results

Date	Time	Opponent^{#}	Rank^{#}	Site	Decision	Result	Record
Regular Season
September 30	5:40 pm PT	University of Utah		Oceanside Ice Arena • Tempe, Arizona	McClelland	W 2-0	1-0-0-0 (1-0-0-0)
October 1	5:40 pm PT	University of Utah		Oceanside Ice Arena • Tempe, Arizona	McClelland	W 3-2	2-0-0-0 (2-0-0-0)
October 12	7:00 pm PT	Grand Canyon University		Mullett Arena • Tempe, Arizona	McClelland	W 4-2	3-0-0-0 (3-0-0-0)
October 21	7:50 pm ET	at University of Massachusetts-Amherst*		Mullins Center • Hadley, Massachusetts	McClelland	W 4-3	4-0-0-0
October 22	11:20am ET	at University of Massachusetts-Amherst*		Mullins Center • Hadley, Massachusetts	McClelland	W 3-1	5-0-0-0
October 23	10:30 am ET	at University of Rhode Island*		Bradford R. Boss Arena • South Kingstown, Rhode Island	McClelland	W 4-3	6-0-0-0
November 4	8:00 pm PT	Grand Canyon University		Oceanside Ice Arena • Tempe, Arizona	McClelland	W 4-3	7-0-0-0 (4-0-0-0)
November 5	6:30 pm PT	Grand Canyon University		Oceanside Ice Arena • Tempe, Arizona	Hellman	L 4-2	7-1-0-0 (4-1-0-0)
December 2	8:00 pm MT	#1 Liberty University*	#10	Oceanside Ice Arena • Tempe, Arizona	McClelland	L 10-2	7-2-0-0
December 3	7:00 pm MT	#1 Liberty University*	#10	Oceanside Ice Arena • Tempe, Arizona	McClelland	L 8-2	7-3-0-0
January 7	6:30 pm MT	at University of Denver		Joy Burns Arena • Denver, Colorado	Hellman	W 11-0	8-3-0-0 (5-1-0-0)
January 8	11:30 am MT	at University of Denver		Joy Burns Arena • Denver, Colorado	Eatinger	W 7-0	9-3-0-0 (6-1-0-0)
January 14	3:30 pm MT	University of Michigan*		Oceanside Ice Arena • Tempe, Arizona	Hellman	T 3-3 ^{OT}	9-3-1-0
January 15	2:30 pm MT	University of Michigan*		AZ Ice Arcadia • Phoenix, Arizona	Hellman	L 2-1	9-4-1-0
January 20	8:00 pm MT	University of Colorado	#10	Oceanside Ice Arena • Tempe, Arizona	Hellman	W 7-0	10-4-1-0 (7-1-0-0)
January 21	7:00 pm MT	University of Colorado	#10	Oceanside Ice Arena • Tempe, Arizona	Hellman	W 7-0	11-4-1-0 (8-1-0-0)
January 27	5:40 pm MT	University of Minnesota*	#10	Oceanside Ice Arena • Tempe, Arizona	Hellman	W 4-1	12-4-1-0
February 3	6:30 pm MT	Michigan State University*	#10	Mountain America Community Iceplex • Tempe, Arizona	Hellman	W 5-1	13-4-1-0
February 4	1:30 pm MT	Michigan State University*	#10	Mullett Arena • Tempe, Arizona	Hellman	W 8-2	14-4-1-0
February 10	5:00 pm MT	at Grand Canyon University	#10	AZ Ice Arcadia • Phoenix, Arizona	Hellman	W 2-1	15-4-1-0 (9-1-0-0)
February 11	4:15 pm MT	Grand Canyon University	#10	AZ Ice Arcadia • Phoenix, Arizona	Hellman	T 3-3 ^{OT}	15-4-2-0 (9-1-1-0)
WWCHL Conference Tournament
February 17	3:30 pm MT	vs. Colorado State University	#9	University of Colorado Boulder Recreation Center • Boulder, Colorado	Hellman	W 4-0	16-4-2-0
February 18	3:30 pm MT	vs. Grand Canyon University	#9	University of Colorado Boulder Recreation Center • Boulder, Colorado	Hellman	W 3-1	17-4-2-0
February 19	11:00 am MT	vs. Grand Canyon University	#9	University of Colorado Boulder Recreation Center • Boulder, Colorado	Hellman	W 5-1	18-4-2-0
ACHA Women's Division 1 Nationals
March 16	10:00 am ET	vs. #6 Maryville University	#7	New England Sports Center • Marlborough, Massachusetts	Hellman	L 2-0	0-1-0-0
March 17	1:00 pm CT	vs. #10 Miami University	#7	New England Sports Center • Marlborough, Massachusetts	Hellman	L 3-2	0-2-0-0
*Non-conference game.

#Rankings from the ACHA Women's Division 1 rankings.

=== 2023–24 results ===
2023–24 schedule and results

Date	Time	Opponent^{#}	Rank^{#}	Site	Decision	Result	Record
Regular Season
September 28	9:15 pm PT	Maryville University*		Mountain America Community Iceplex • Tempe, Arizona	Hellman	L 5-2	0-1-0-0
September 29	6:55 pm PT	Maryville University*		Mountain America Community Iceplex • Tempe, Arizona	Eatinger	W 2-1	1-1-0-0
October 13	9:37 pm PT	University of Utah		Mountain America Community Iceplex • Tempe, Arizona	Eatinger	W 3-2	2-1-0-0 (1-0-0-0)
October 14	7:36 pm PT	University of Utah		Mountain America Community Iceplex • Tempe, Arizona	Hellman	W 7-1	3-1-0-0 (2-0-0-0)
October 27	5:00 pm MT	at University of Colorado		University of Colorado Boulder Recreation Center • Boulder, Colorado	Hellman	W 7-0	4-1-0-0 (3-0-0-0)
October 28	9:00 am MT	at University of Colorado		University of Colorado Boulder Recreation Center • Boulder, Colorado	Eatinger	W 2-0	5-1-0-0 (4-0-0-0)
October 28	4:45 pm MT	at Colorado State University		Edora Pool Ice Center • Fort Collins, Colorado	Hellman	W 4-1	6-1-0-0 (5-0-0-0)
October 29	1:50 pm MT	at Colorado State University		Edora Pool Ice Center • Fort Collins, Colorado	Eatinger	W 5-0	7-1-0-0 (6-0-0-0)
November 3	4:00 pm PT	at Grand Canyon University	#9	AZ Ice Arcadia • Phoenix, Arizona	Hellman	W 7-1	8-1-0-0 (7-0-0-0)
November 4	4:00 pm PT	at Grand Canyon University	#9	AZ Ice Arcadia • Phoenix, Arizona	Eatinger	W 5-0	9-1-0-0 (8-0-0-0)
November 11	2:38 pm MT	Grand Canyon University	#7	Mountain America Community Iceplex • Tempe, Arizona	Hellman	W 6-0	10-1-0-0 (9-0-0-0)
January 11	4:30 pm CT	at #5 McKendree University*	#7	McKendree Metro Rec Plex • O'Fallon, Illinois	Hellman	L 5-0	10-2-0-0
January 12	2:00 pm CT	at #6 Maryville University*	#7	Maryville University Hockey Center • Chesterfield, Missouri	Eatinger	L 7-0	10-3-0-0
January 13	8:05 pm CT	at #6 Maryville University*	#7	Maryville University Hockey Center • Chesterfield, Missouri	Eatinger	W 3-1	11-3-0-0
January 14	1:30 pm CT	at #5 McKendree University*	#7	McKendree Metro Rec Plex • O'Fallon, Illinois	Eatinger	W 5-2	12-3-0-0
January 15	10:30 am CT	at #12 Lindenwood University*	#7	Centene Community Ice Center • Maryland Heights, Missouri	Eatinger	T 5-5 ^{OT}	12-3-1-0
January 19	9:35 pm MT	University of Denver	#7	Mountain America Community Iceplex • Tempe, Arizona	Hellman	W 10-1	13-3-1-0 (10-0-0-0)
January 20	9:36 pm MT	University of Denver	#7	Mountain America Community Iceplex • Tempe, Arizona	Eatinger	W 9-0	14-3-1-0 (11-0-0-0)
January 26	1:30 pm MT	at University of Utah	#9	Salt Lake City Sports Complex • Salt Lake City, Utah	Eatinger	W 3-0	15-3-1-0 (12-0-0-0)
January 27	1:30 pm MT	at University of Utah	#9	Salt Lake City Sports Complex • Salt Lake City, Utah	Eatinger	W 3-2	16-3-1-0 (13-0-0-0)
February 2	9:38 pm MT	Grand Canyon University	#11	Mountain America Community Iceplex • Tempe, Arizona	Eatinger	W 6-0	17-3-1-0 (14-0-0-0)
February 3	7:44 pm MT	Grand Canyon University	#11	Mountain America Community Iceplex • Tempe, Arizona	Eatinger	W 7-0	18-3-1-0 (15-0-0-0)
WWCHL Conference Tournament
February 23	4:30 pm MT	vs. Colorado State University	#10	Salt Lake City Sports Complex • Salt Lake City, Utah	Eatinger	W 7-0	19-3-1-0
February 24	4:30 pm MT	vs. University of Utah	#10	Salt Lake City Sports Complex • Salt Lake City, Utah	Eatinger	W 3-0	20-3-1-0
February 25	11:00 am MT	vs. University of Colorado	#10	Salt Lake City Sports Complex • Salt Lake City, Utah	Eatinger	W 6-2	21-3-1-0
ACHA Women's Division 1 Nationals
March 13	7:31 pm CT	vs. #3 Adrian College	#10	Centene Community Ice Center • Maryland Heights, Missouri	Eatinger	L 5-0	0-1-0-0
March 14	1:00 pm CT	vs. #5 Maryville University	#10	Centene Community Ice Center • Maryland Heights, Missouri	Eatinger	W 3-2 ^{OT}	1-1-0-0
March 15	7:30 pm CT	vs. #1 Liberty University	#10	Centene Community Ice Center • Maryland Heights, Missouri	Eatinger	L 3-2 ^{OT}	1-2-0-0
*Non-conference game.

#Rankings from the ACHA Women's Division 1 rankings.

=== 2024–25 results ===
2024–25 schedule and results

Date	Time	Opponent^{#}	Rank^{#}	Site	Decision	Result	Record
Regular Season
October 4	7:35 pm PT	Grand Canyon University*		Mountain America Community Iceplex • Tempe, Arizona	Eatinger	W 9-3	1-0-0-0
October 5	5:40 pm PT	at Grand Canyon University*		AZ Ice Arcadia • Phoenix, Arizona	Eatinger	W 5-1	2-0-0-0
October 24	8:15 pm CT	at #1 Maryville University*		Maryville University Hockey Center • Chesterfield, Missouri	Eatinger	L 6-0	2-1-0-0
October 25	1:30 pm CT	at #11 Lindenwood University*		Centene Community Ice Center • Maryland Heights, Missouri	Eatinger	L 5-1	2-2-0-0
October 26	8:30 pm CT	at #11 Lindenwood University*		Centene Community Ice Center • Maryland Heights, Missouri	Eatinger	L 4-3 ^{OT}	2-2-0-1
October 27	12:00 pm CT	at #2 McKendree University*		McKendree Metro Rec Plex • O'Fallon, Illinois	Eatinger	L 3-2	2-3-0-1
November 3	12:30 pm MT	University of Denver*		Mountain America Community Iceplex • Tempe, Arizona	Eatinger	W 6-0	3-3-0-1
November 8	7:30 pm MT	University of Arizona*		Mountain America Community Iceplex • Tempe, Arizona	Kimel	W 2-1 ^{OT}	4-3-0-1
November 15	4:30 pm MT	Grand Canyon University*		Mountain America Community Iceplex • Tempe, Arizona	Kimel	W 7-1	5-3-0-1
November 21	8:30 pm MT	#2 McKendree University*		Mountain America Community Iceplex • Tempe, Arizona	Eatinger	W 3-0	6-3-0-1
November 22	7:30 pm MT	#2 McKendree University*		Mountain America Community Iceplex • Tempe, Arizona	Eatinger	L 3-2 ^{OT}	6-3-0-2
January 10	7:30 pm MT	#15 Michigan State University*	#13	Mountain America Community Iceplex • Tempe, Arizona	Kimel	L 6-4	6-4-0-2
January 23	9:35 pm MT	#4 Midland University*	#14	Mountain America Community Iceplex • Tempe, Arizona	Eatinger	W 2-1	7-4-0-2
January 24	4:35 pm MT	#4 Midland University*	#14	Mountain America Community Iceplex • Tempe, Arizona	Eatinger	L 2-1	7-5-0-2
January 25	2:35 pm MT	University of Massachusetts-Amherst*	#14	Mountain America Community Iceplex • Tempe, Arizona	Eatinger	W 3-2	8-5-0-2
January 26	10:35 am MT	University of Massachusetts-Amherst*	#14	Mullett Arena • Tempe, Arizona	Kimel	W 2-0	9-5-0-2
February 1	1:42 pm MT	University of Arizona*	#11	Mullett Arena • Tempe, Arizona	Eatinger	W 5-1	10-5-0-2
February 12	7:00 pm ET	at #2 Adrian College*	#11	Arrington Ice Arena • Adrian, Michigan	Eatinger	L 4-2	10-6-0-2
February 13	7:30 pm ET	at #12 University of Michigan*	#11	Yost Ice Arena • Ann Arbor, Michigan	Eatinger	W 5-2	11-6-0-2
February 14	7:30 pm ET	at Grand Valley State University*	#11	Griff's Georgetown • Hudsonville, Michigan	Eatinger	W 4-2	12-6-0-2
February 15	4:30 pm ET	at Grand Valley State University*	#11	Griff's Georgetown • Hudsonville, Michigan	Eatinger	W 5-2	13-6-0-2
February 16	12:45 pm ET	at #8 University of Michigan-Dearborn*	#11	UM-Dearborn Ice Arena • Dearborn, Michigan	Eatinger	L 1-0	13-7-0-2
February 20	1:00 pm MT	at University of Arizona*	#11	Tucson Arena • Tucson, Arizona	Eatinger	W 6-1	14-7-0-2
February 21	1:00 pm MT	at University of Arizona*	#11	Tucson Arena • Tucson, Arizona	Eatinger	W 5-1	15-7-0-2
ACHA Women's Division 1 Nationals
March 17	1:00 pm CT	vs. #3 Adrian College*	#10	Centene Community Ice Center • Maryland Heights, Missouri	Eatinger	L 4-1	0-1-0-0
March 19	1:00 pm CT	vs. #6 McKendree University*	#10	Maryville University Hockey Center • Chesterfield, Missouri	Eatinger	L 3-2 ^{OT}	0-1-0-1
*Non-conference game.

#Rankings from the ACHA Women's Division 1 rankings.

=== 2025–26 results ===
2025–26 schedule and results

Date	Time	Opponent^{#}	Rank^{#}	Site	Decision	Result	Record
Regular Season
October 12	2:02 pm MT	University of Arizona*		Mullett Arena • Tempe, Arizona	Eatinger	W 2-0	1-0-0-0
October 16	7:20 pm ET	at #7 University of Massachusetts-Amherst*	#10	Mullins Center • Hadley, Massachusetts	Eatinger	W 3-2	2-0-0-0
October 17	6:25 pm ET	at #7 University of Massachusetts-Amherst*	#10	Mullins Center • Hadley, Massachusetts	Eatinger	W 3-0	3-0-0-0
October 19	9:00 am ET	at University of Rhode Island*	#10	Bradford R. Boss Arena • South Kingstown, Rhode Island	Eatinger	W 3-0	4-0-0-0
October 25	3:45 pm CT	at #7 Minot State University*	#4	Maysa Arena • Minot, North Dakota	Eatinger	T 2-2 ^{OT}	4-0-1-0
October 26	1:00 pm CT	at #7 Minot State University*	#4	Maysa Arena • Minot, North Dakota	Eatinger	L 4-0	4-1-1-0
October 27	10:00 am CT	at #13 University of Jamestown*	#4	John L. Wilson Arena • Jamestown, North Dakota	Glaister	L 4-3 ^{OT}	4-1-1-1
November 7	3:45 pm MT	University of Arizona*	#7	Mountain America Community Iceplex • Tempe, Arizona	Glaister	W 3-0	5-1-1-1
November 13	2:00 pm CT	at #3 McKendree University*	#7	McKendree Metro Rec Plex • O'Fallon, Illinois	Glaister	L 1-0	5-2-1-1
November 14	2:00 pm CT	at #3 McKendree University*	#7	McKendree Metro Rec Plex • O'Fallon, Illinois	Glaister	L 2-0	5-3-1-1
November 15	8:15 pm CT	at #5 Maryville University*	#7	Maryville University Hockey Center • Chesterfield, Missouri	Eatinger	L 8-1	5-4-1-1
November 16	2:20 pm CT	at #5 Maryville University*	#7	Maryville University Hockey Center • Chesterfield, Missouri	Glaister	L 5-3	5-5-1-1
November 21	5:57 pm MT	at Grand Canyon University*	#9	AZ Ice Arcadia • Phoenix, Arizona	Eatinger	W 5-2	6-5-1-1
November 22	9:15 pm MT	at Grand Canyon University*	#9	AZ Ice Arcadia • Phoenix, Arizona	Glaister	W 4-2	7-5-1-1
January 16	3:39 pm MT	Lake Superior State University*	#8	Mountain America Community Iceplex • Tempe, Arizona	Eatinger	L 3-2	7-6-1-1
January 17	2:35 pm MT	Lake Superior State University*	#8	Mountain America Community Iceplex • Tempe, Arizona	Glaister	W 4-2	8-6-1-1
January 18	12:38 pm MT	Lake Superior State University*	#8	Mountain America Community Iceplex • Tempe, Arizona	Glaister	W 5-0	9-6-1-1
January 21	9:38 pm MT	University of Utah*	#8	Mountain America Community Iceplex • Tempe, Arizona	Glaister	W 3-0	10-6-1-1
February 5	9:20 pm MT	Lindenwood University*	#8	Mountain America Community Iceplex • Tempe, Arizona	Glaister	W 6-0	11-6-1-1
February 6	4:05 pm MT	Lindenwood University*	#8	Mountain America Community Iceplex • Tempe, Arizona	Eatinger	W 2-0	12-6-1-1
February 13	6:04 pm MT	Grand Canyon University*	#8	Mountain America Community Iceplex • Tempe, Arizona	Glaister	L 3-2	12-7-1-1
February 14	6:14 pm MT	Grand Canyon University*	#8	Mountain America Community Iceplex • Tempe, Arizona	Eatinger	L 3-1	12-8-1-1
February 20	1:07 pm MT	at University of Arizona*	#9	Tucson Arena • Tucson, Arizona	Glaister	W 4-3 ^{OT}	13-8-1-1
February 21	1:00 pm MT	at University of Arizona*	#9	Tucson Arena • Tucson, Arizona	Glaister	W 5-0	14-8-1-1
ACHA Women's Division 1 Nationals
March 18	—	vs. #4 McKendree University*	#9	Centene Community Ice Center • Maryland Heights, Missouri	Glaister	L 2-0	0-1-0-0
March 20	—	vs. #5 Maryville University*	#9	Centene Community Ice Center • Maryland Heights, Missouri	Glaister	L 5-0	0-2-0-0
*Non-conference game.

#Rankings from the ACHA Women's Division 1 rankings.

=== 2026–27 results ===
2026–27 schedule and results

Date	Time	Opponent^{#}	Rank^{#}	Site	Decision	Result	Record
Regular Season
October 2	7:30 pm MT	at University of Arizona*		Tucson Convention Center • Tucson, Arizona	Glaister	W 4-3 ^{OT}	1-0-0-0
October 3	1:00 pm MT	at University of Arizona*		Tucson Convention Center • Tucson, Arizona	Glaister	L 2-0	1-1-0-0
October 4	1:07 pm MT	University of Colorado*		Mountain America Community Iceplex • Tempe, Arizona	Morton	L 3-1	1-2-0-0
October 18	10:08 am MT	Montana State University*		Mountain America Community Iceplex • Tempe, Arizona	Glaister	W 6-1	2-2-0-0
October 30	8:00 pm MT	at #12 Grand Canyon University*		AZ Ice Arcadia • Phoenix, Arizona	Glaister	L 5-0	2-3-0-0
October 31	7:32 pm MT	at #12 Grand Canyon University*		AZ Ice Arcadia • Phoenix, Arizona	Morton	L 2-1	2-4-0-0
November 6	4:00 pm CT	vs. University of Jamestown*		Sidner Ice Arena • Fremont, Nebraska	Morton	T 2-2 ^{OT}	2-4-1-0
November 7	4:00 pm CT	at Midland University*		Sidner Ice Arena • Fremont, Nebraska	Morton	L 6-0	2-5-1-0
November 8	12:00 pm CT	at Midland University*		Sidner Ice Arena • Fremont, Nebraska	Glaister	L 5-0	2-6-1-0
November 19	9:15 pm MT	Niagara University*		Mountain America Community Iceplex • Tempe, Arizona	Glaister	W 4-2	3-6-1-0
November 20	8:00 pm MT	Niagara University*		Mountain America Community Iceplex • Tempe, Arizona	Glaister	L 4-1	3-7-1-0
December 4	8:55 pm MT	Arizona State University (Women's Division 2)*		Mountain America Community Iceplex • Tempe, Arizona	—		
January 14	9:15 pm MT	University of Massachusetts-Amherst*		Mountain America Community Iceplex • Tempe, Arizona	—		
January 15	9:15 pm MT	University of Massachusetts-Amherst*		Mountain America Community Iceplex • Tempe, Arizona	—		
January 17	1:00 pm MT	Michigan State University*		Mountain America Community Iceplex • Tempe, Arizona	—		
January 23	1:30 pm MT	Minot State University*		Mountain America Community Iceplex • Tempe, Arizona	—		
January 24	1:00 pm MT	Minot State University*		Mountain America Community Iceplex • Tempe, Arizona	—		
January 28	10:30 am CT	at Lindenwood University*		Centene Community Ice Center • Maryland Heights, Missouri	—		
January 29	3:45 pm CT	at McKendree University*		McKendree Metro Rec Plex • O'Fallon, Illinois	—		
January 30	5:00 pm CT	at McKendree University*		McKendree Metro Rec Plex • O'Fallon, Illinois	—		
January 31	8:10 pm CT	at Lindenwood University*		Centene Community Ice Center • Maryland Heights, Missouri	—		
February 5	4:30 pm MT	University of Arizona*		Mountain America Community Iceplex • Tempe, Arizona	—		
February 6	4:30 pm MT	University of Arizona*		Mountain America Community Iceplex • Tempe, Arizona	—		
February 12	9:15 pm MT	Grand Canyon University*		Mountain America Community Iceplex • Tempe, Arizona	—		
February 13	2:30 pm MT	Grand Canyon University*		Mountain America Community Iceplex • Tempe, Arizona	—		
February 26	9:15 pm MT	University of Rhode Island*		Mountain America Community Iceplex • Tempe, Arizona	—		
February 27	7:15 pm MT	University of Rhode Island*		Mountain America Community Iceplex • Tempe, Arizona	—		
*Non-conference game.

#Rankings from the ACHA Women's Division 1 rankings.

== Record vs opponents ==
All-time results through November 8, 2026, including ACHA National Tournament games.

School	Games	Winning %	Overall	Home	Road	GF	GA
Adrian College	4	.000	0-4-0	0-0-0	0-4-0	3	18
Aquinas College	2	1.000	2-0-0	0-0-0	2-0-0	8	4
Assiniboine College (D2)	3	.000	0-3-0	0-3-0	0-0-0	3	12
Colorado State University	16	.750	12-4-0	6-1-0	6-3-0	67	34
Concordia University Ann Arbor	2	1.000	2-0-0	1-0-0	1-0-0	21	1
Davenport University	1	1.000	1-0-0	0-0-0	1-0-0	6	1
Grand Canyon University	43	.767	32-9-2	18-4-1	14-5-1	155	74
Grand Valley State University	2	1.000	2-0-0	0-0-0	2-0-0	9	4
Lake Superior State University	3	.667	2-1-0	2-1-0	0-0-0	11	5
Liberty University	5	.000	0-5-0	0-2-0	0-3-0	7	37
Lindenwood University	7	.357	2-4-1	2-2-0	0-2-1	20	19
Lindenwood University-Belleville	5	.000	0-5-0	0-1-0	0-4-0	3	25
Maryville University	11	.364	4-7-0	2-1-0	2-6-0	20	44
McKendree University	11	.182	2-9-0	1-3-0	1-6-0	15	31
Miami University	3	.000	0-3-0	0-1-0	0-2-0	3	17
Michigan State University	3	.667	2-1-0	2-1-0	0-0-0	17	9
Midland University	14	.107	1-12-1	1-6-1	0-6-0	19	51
Minot State University	2	.250	0-1-1	0-0-0	0-1-1	2	6
Montana State University	1	1.000	1-0-0	1-0-0	0-0-0	6	1
Ohio State University	1	1.000	1-0-0	0-0-0	1-0-0	4	2
United States Air Force Academy	2	1.000	2-0-0	2-0-0	0-0-0	42	0
University of Arizona	10	.900	9-1-0	4-0-0	5-1-0	36	12
University of Colorado	19	.316	6-13-0	3-5-0	3-8-0	48	61
University of Denver	16	.938	15-1-0	9-1-0	6-0-0	118	17
University of Jamestown	2	.250	0-1-1	0-0-0	0-1-1	5	6
University of Massachusetts-Amherst	8	.875	7-1-0	3-1-0	4-0-0	22	14
University of Michigan	4	.625	2-1-1	0-1-1	2-0-0	14	8
University of Michigan-Dearborn	1	.000	0-1-0	0-0-0	0-1-0	0	1
University of Minnesota	6	.167	1-5-0	1-3-0	0-2-0	7	31
University of Rhode Island	2	1.000	2-0-0	0-0-0	2-0-0	7	3
University of Utah	14	.929	13-1-0	10-0-0	3-1-0	55	12
University of Wisconsin-Madison	2	.000	0-2-0	0-1-0	0-1-0	3	7
Totals	225	.562	123-95-7	68-38-3	55-57-4	756	567

== ACHA ranking history ==
The final ACHA ranking of the season determines which teams are invited to the ACHA National Tournament. In the 2016–17 and 2017–18 seasons, the ACHA tabulated rankings each week during the season and issued them on Tuesdays following weekends including games. Beginning in 2018–19, the ACHA switched to an entirely computerized system with again weekly rankings being released, albeit not always on Tuesdays.

Year	Ranking														
Year	1	2	3	4	5	6	7	8	9	10	11	12	13	14	15
2016–17															
2017–18	RV	RV	RV	RV	RV	RV			RV	RV	RV	RV	RV	15	15
2018–19	12	14	14	14					15	15				16	
2019–20	12	13	12	13	12	12	12	12	12	12					
2020–21	Did Not Play (COVID-19)														
2021–22	11	13	10	11	11	10	10	10	10	9					
2022–23	8	8	7	8	10	10	10	10	9	9	8	7			
2023–24	9	7	7	7	7	9	11	10	10	10	10				
2024–25	6						13	13	14	14	11	11	11	11	10
2025–26	10	4	7	7	7	9	9	8	8	8	8	8	9	9	9
2026–27															

== Program records ==
=== Career scoring leaders ===
Players with 14 or more career points, through the 2025–26 season.

Player	Years	Games	Goals	Assists	Points	Penalty minutes
Sam Murphy	2021 – 2026	110	57	73	130	153
Sydney Paulsen	2022 – 2025	78	39	41	80	26
Kat Jones	2018 – 2022	69	44	31	75	10
Sheridan Gloyd	2018 – 2023	94	13	35	48	115
Jill Ketchum	2021 – 2024	51	25	22	47	62
Danielle Dupont	2018 – 2020	44	19	25	44	18
Maddie Pladson	2021 – 2024	75	16	28	44	50
Breanne Powell	2023 – 2026	61	26	13	39	26
Andi Main	2019 – 2023	71	16	23	39	14
Hayley Martin	2021 – 2024	60	16	22	38	99
Paige Ring	2023 – 2026	65	11	27	38	10
Elle McKenna	2022 – 2025	64	21	16	37	103
Kylie Brown	2024 – 2026	51	30	5	35	65
Finn Larson	2018 – 2022	66	15	18	33	22
Kyly Laybolt	2024 – 2026	44	11	21	32	20
Berkleigh Radcliffe	2021 – 2024	78	8	24	32	45
KC McGinley	2016 – 2019	64	13	18	31	34
Logan Sutera	2022 – 2024	47	14	16	30	47
Amber Galles	2016 – 2018	41	20	9	29	58
Mason Walker	2022 – 2023	26	20	9	29	28
Sami Lutsch	2021 – 2024	76	15	14	29	24
Tristan Craig	2022 – 2024	53	12	17	29	12
Anita Fleming	2023 – 2024	28	15	12	27	12
Dannika Borges	2016 – 2018	41	13	13	26	122
Hannah Kunz	2023 – 2026	76	8	18	26	20
Madi Mesenbrink	2021 – 2024	73	11	14	25	94
Alyssa Ayers	2017 – 2019	47	11	12	23	41
Catherine Jones	2017 – 2019	47	10	12	22	14
Taylor Northcott	2019 – 2022	42	10	12	22	48
Aubrey Beskid	2017 – 2020	59	6	15	21	14
Shae Cecchini	2021 – 2022	24	10	10	20	14
Taylor England	2016 – 2018	41	9	11	20	10
Amelia Smith	2022 – 2023	24	14	5	19	8
Britney Bridel	2022 – 2024	53	10	9	19	2
Karlie Chadwick	2019 – 2023	65	9	10	19	43
Taylor Bierlmeier	2024 – 2026	52	6	13	19	10
Camryn Kozak	2022 – 2023	25	4	15	19	2
Paige Brien	2024 – 2026	52	10	8	18	35
Erin Rawls	2016 – 2020	70	5	13	18	19
Abi McGee	2019 – 2020	22	9	8	17	22
Amy Gulliksen	2018 – 2020	43	6	11	17	4
Cameron Devenney	2025 – 2026	26	6	11	17	2
Molly Potter	2016 – 2020	86	5	10	15	28
Mara Draper	2024 – 2026	52	3	12	15	12
Lula Swanson	2024 – 2025	23	9	5	14	2
Evelyn Olson	2023 – 2026	73	5	9	14	18

- Games: (110) Sam Murphy, 2021–22 to 2025–26
- Goals: (57) Sam Murphy, 2021–22 to 2025–26
- Assists: (73) Sam Murphy, 2021–22 to 2025–26
- Points: (130) Sam Murphy, 2021–22 to 2025–26
- Power Play Goals: (17) Kylie Brown, 2024–25 to 2025–26
- Shorthanded Goals: (4) Hayley Martin, 2021–22 to 2023–24
- Game-Winning Goals: (11) Sam Murphy, 2021–22 to 2025–26
- Penalty Minutes: (153) Sam Murphy, 2021–22 to 2025–26

=== Scoring leaders by season ===
Season	Games	Goals	Assists	Points	Points/Game	Penalty Minutes
2016–17	17 – 8 Players Tied	8 – Amber Galles	6 – Dannika Borges	11 – Dannika Borges	0.59 – Amber Galles	66 – Dannika Borges
2017–18	24 – 9 Players Tied	12 – Amber Galles	13 – KC McGinley	19 – Galles & McGinley	0.79 – Galles & McGinley	56 – Dannika Borges
2018–19	23 – 12 Players Tied	13 – Kat Jones	11 – Dupont & Gulliksen	22 – Kat Jones	0.96 – Kat Jones	26 – Sheridan Gloyd
2019–20	22 – 12 Players Tied	20 – Kat Jones	14 – Danielle Dupont	31 – Kat Jones	1.41 – Kat Jones	36 – Gloyd & Northcott
2021–22	24 – 6 Players Tied	25 – Sam Murphy	20 – Sam Murphy	45 – Sam Murphy	2.25 – Sam Murphy	33 – Sheridan Gloyd
2022–23	24 – 7 Players Tied	20 – Mason Walker	15 – Camryn Kozak	29 – Mason Walker	1.23 – Sam Murphy	38 – Elle McKenna
2023–24	25 – 8 Players Tied	15 – Anita Fleming	21 – Sydney Paulsen	33 – Sydney Paulsen	1.32 – Sydney Paulsen	51 – Madi Mesenbrink
2024–25	24 – 5 Players Tied	17 – Kylie Brown	14 – Paige Ring	21 – Sam Murphy	1.00 – Sam Murphy	36 – Kylie Brown
2025–26	24 – 6 Players Tied	12 – Kylie Brown	12 – Sam Murphy	19 – Kyly Laybolt	0.83 – Kyly Laybolt	49 – Sam Murphy

- Games: (25) 8 Tied
- Goals: (25) Sam Murphy, 2021–22
- Assists: (21) Sydney Paulsen, 2023–24
- Points: (45) Sam Murphy, 2021–22
- Points/Game: (2.25) Sam Murphy, 2021–22
- Power Play Goals: (9) Kylie Brown, 2025–26
- Shorthanded Goals: (3) Hayley Martin, 2021–22
- Penalty Minutes: (66) Dannika Borges, 2016–17

=== Single game scoring leaders ===
- Goals (5): Sam Murphy, Saturday, January 22, 2022 vs. Denver
- Assists (4): 3 Players Tied: Alyssa Ayers, Shae Cecchini, Sam Murphy (2x)
- Points (7): Sam Murphy (2x), Friday, November 5, 2021 vs. Air Force & Saturday, November 6, 2021 vs. Air Force
- Power Play Goals (2): 5 Players Tied: Kat Jones, Sheridan Gloyd, Maddie Pladson, Paige Ring, Mason Walker
- Penalty Minutes (27): Madi Mesenbrink, Saturday, November 4, 2023 @ Grand Canyon

== Goaltenders ==
=== Goaltender career stats ===
Nine goalies have played for ASU Women's Hockey through the 2025–26 season.

Player	Years	Games played (record)	Minutes	Saves	Save pct.	GAA	Shutouts
Jordan Nash-Boulden	2016 – 2020	73 (32-38-2)	4402:27	2,624	.922	3.03	4
Quinn Eatinger	2022 – 2026	54 (35-17-2)	3256:00	1,485	.936	1.89	16
Karsyn Hellman	2021 – 2024	40 (27-10-2)	2311:00	794	.928	1.55	13
Hallie McClelland	2021 – 2023	19 (11-7-0)	1049:00	488	.891	3.16	2
Mya Glaister	2025 – Present	16 (8-7-0)	942:00	443	.929	2.12	5
Brianna Hersom	2016 – 2017	7 (0-6-0)	353:06	296	.911	4.93	0
Macy Eide	2018 – 2020	6 (3-3-0)	360:00	185	.916	2.83	2
Brooke Kimel	2023 – 2026	4 (3-1-0)	243:00	92	.929	1.75	1
Landry Phelps	2019 – 2020	2 (2-0-0)	120:00	24	.923	1.00	1

=== Single season goaltender records ===
- Games Played: (24) Jordan Nash-Boulden, 2017–18
- Wins: (15) Quinn Eatinger, 2023–24
- Minutes Played: (1499:01) Jordan Nash-Boulden, 2017–18
- Shutouts: (9) Quinn Eatinger, 2023–24
- Saves: (921) Jordan Nash-Boulden, 2017–18
- Save percentage: (.949) Quinn Eatinger, 2023–24

=== Single game goaltender records ===
- Shots faced: (83) Brianna Hersom, November 18, 2016 @ Lindenwood-Belleville
- Saves: (77) Brianna Hersom, November 18, 2016 @ Lindenwood-Belleville

== Historical notes ==
=== Hat tricks ===
Arizona State women's hockey has seen 18 hat tricks recorded in program history, plus three 4-goal games and one 5-goal game. Kat Jones leads the program with 4 career hat tricks.

- Amber Galles: Saturday, February 4, 2017 vs. Denver
- Kat Jones: Thursday, October 25, 2018 vs. Concordia Ann Arbor
- Danielle Dupont: Saturday, September 29, 2019 @ Colorado State (4 Goals)
- Kat Jones: Friday, November 8, 2019 vs. Davenport 2nd Career Hat Trick
- Kat Jones: Sunday, November 10, 2019 vs. Michigan 3rd Career Hat Trick
- Malak Rabuck: Saturday, November 23, 2019 vs. Utah
- Kat Jones: Friday, November 5, 2021 vs. Air Force 4th Career Hat Trick
- Jill Ketchum: Friday, November 5, 2021 vs. Air Force (4 Goals)
- Andi Main: Friday, November 5, 2021 vs. Air Force
- Sam Murphy: Friday, November 5, 2021 vs. Air Force
- Hayley Martin: Saturday, November 6, 2021 vs. Air Force
- Sam Murphy: Saturday, November 6, 2021 vs. Air Force 2nd Career Hat Trick
- Shae Cecchini: Saturday, January 22, 2022 vs. Denver
- Sam Murphy: Saturday, January 22, 2022 vs. Denver (5 Goals) 3rd Career Hat Trick
- Finn Larson: Sunday, January 23, 2022 vs. Denver
- Jill Ketchum: Saturday, February 19, 2022 vs. Utah 2nd Career Hat Trick
- Mason Walker: Saturday, October 22, 2022 @ UMass
- Amelia Smith: Saturday, January 7, 2023 @ Denver
- Sydney Paulsen: Saturday, February 4, 2023 vs. Michigan State (4 Goals)
- Breanne Powell: Saturday, November 11, 2023 vs. Grand Canyon
- Sydney Paulsen: Sunday, January 14, 2024 @ McKendree 2nd Career Hat Trick
- Madi Mesenbrink: Friday, January 19, 2024 vs. Denver

== Award winners ==
=== ACHA honors ===
Second Team All-American

- Jordan Nash-Boulden (Goalie) - 2019–20
- Sam Murphy (Forward) - 2021–22

Second Team All-Athletic

- Flo Awde (Defense) - 2022–23
- Maddie Pladson (Defense) - 2023–24

First Team All-Rookie

- Kylie Brown (Defense) - 2024–25

Academic All-American

- Jordan Nash-Boulden (Goalie) - 2018–19
- Karlie Chadwick (Forward) - 2021–22
- Kat Jones (Forward) - 2021–22
- Emily Kline (Defense) - 2021–22
- Andi Main (Forward) - 2021–22
- Maddie Pladson (Defense) - 2021–22

=== Conference honors ===
WWCHL MVP

- Karsyn Hellman (Goalie) - 2022–23
- Paige Ring (Forward) - 2023–24

First Team All-WWCHL

- KC McGinley (Defense) - 2016–17
- KC McGinley (Defense) - 2017–18
- Jordan Nash-Boulden (Goalie) - 2017–18
- Alyssa Ayers (Forward) - 2018–19
- Jordan Nash-Boulden (Goalie) - 2019–20
- Danielle Dupont (Forward) - 2019–20
- Sam Murphy (Forward) - 2021–22
- Mason Walker (Forward) - 2022–23
- Flo Awde (Defense) - 2022–23
- Sydney Paulsen (Forward) - 2023–24
- Maddie Pladson (Defense) - 2023–24
- Quinn Eatinger (Goalie) - 2023–24

Second Team All-WWCHL

- Taylor Northcott (Defense) - 2019–20
- Sami Lutsch (Defense) - 2021–22
- Maddie Pladson (Defense) - 2021–22

WWCHL All-Rookie Team

- Camryn Kozak (Forward) - 2022–23

WWCHL Coach of the Year

- Lindsey Ellis - 2021–22
- Lindsey Ellis - 2022–23
- Lindsey Ellis - 2023–24

== See also ==
- American Collegiate Hockey Association
- Western Women's Collegiate Hockey League
- Arizona State University
