= The Independent (disambiguation) =

The Independent is an online British daily newspaper, formerly a print publication.

The Independent may also refer to:

== Arts, entertainment, and media ==
=== Films ===
- The Independent (2000 film), starring Jerry Stiller
- The Independent (2007 film), an Australian independent film
- The Independent (2022 film), an American film starring Jodie Turner-Smith and Brian Cox

=== Music ===
- The Independents (ska band)
- The Independents (vocal group), 1970s R&B group

=== Periodicals ===
==== Magazines in the United States ====
- The Independent (1899—present), Kansas City, Kansas magazine (Media in Kansas City, Missouri#Magazines)

==== Newspapers in the United States ====
- The Independent (Acadiana), published in Lafayette, Louisiana
- The Independent (Ashland), published in Ashland, Kentucky
- The Independent (Boston), published in Boston, Massachusetts from 1924 to 1928
- The Independent (Livermore), published in Livermore, California
- The Independent (Massillon), published in Massillon, Ohio
- The Independent (Moab, Utah), published in Moab, Utah
- The Independent (New York City), a magazine published from 1848 to 1928
- The Independent (East Hampton), published in East Hampton, New York
- Independent (New Mexico newspaper), published in Gallup, New Mexico
- The Independent, published in Pasadena, California
- The Independent, published in Presque Isle, Maine by J. S. Hodgdon (publisher)
- Evening Independent, formerly published in St. Petersburg, Florida
- Independent, or The Independent, the previous name of the Press-Telegram in Long Beach, California
- The College Hill Independent, commonly known as The Indy, published by university students in Providence, Rhode Island
- The Daily Independent, formerly published in Kannapolis, North Carolina and merged with The Concord Tribune to form the Independent Tribune
- The Independent Newspaper Group, of Massachusetts
- Santa Barbara Independent, weekly newspaper in Santa Barbara, California

==== Newspapers in other countries ====
- The Independent (London), an online daily newspaper, formerly a print publication founded in 1986
- The Malta Independent, a Maltese paper and online newspaper founded in 1992
- The Independent (Bangladesh), published in Dhaka, Bangladesh from 1995 to 2022
- The Independent (Footscray), published in Footscray, Victoria, Australia from 1883 to 1933
- The Independent (Gambia), published from 1999 to 2006 in the Gambia
- Irish Independent, an Irish daily newspaper founded in 1905
  - Daily Irish Independent, its predecessor, founded in the 1890s
- The Independent (Newfoundland), published in St John's, Newfoundland, founded in 2001
- Independent (Nigeria), published in Lagos, Nigeria, founded in 2001
- The Independent (Papua New Guinea), published in Papua New Guinea from 1980 to 2003
- The Independent (Perth), published in Western Australia from 1969 to 1986
- The Independent (Uganda), published in Uganda, founded in 2007
- Nezavisimaya Gazeta (Russian: Независимая газета, 'Independent Newspaper'), published in Russia since 1990
- The Independent Weekly, published in Adelaide, South Australia from 2004 to 2010
- Tongnip Sinmun (Korean: 독립신문; Hanja: 獨立新聞, The Independent), published in Seoul, Korea from 1896 to 1899

== Politics ==
- The Independent Group for Change, a British political party formed and dissolved in 2019
- The Independents (UK), a British political grouping formed in 2019
- The Independents (Liechtenstein), a right-wing populist Eurosceptic political party in Liechtenstein, headed by the former Patriotic Union parliamentarian Harry Quaderer
- Independent politician, not affiliated with any political party

== Other uses ==
- The Independent (Austin, Texas), a skyscraper in Austin, Texas

== See also ==
- Independent (disambiguation)
- The Independents (disambiguation)
- The Indypendent, newspaper of the New York City Independent Media Center
