= Independente =

Independente may refer to:

- Independente Atlético Clube (PA), Brazilian football men's and women's club from Tucuruí, Pará
- Independente Esporte Clube, Brazilian football club from Santana, Amapá
- Independente Futebol Clube, Brazilian football club from Limeira, São Paulo
- Independente University, former Portuguese private university from Lisbon
- O Independente, former Portuguese weekly newspaper
- Televisão Independente, Portuguese terrestrial television
- Sociedade Independente de Comunicação, Portuguese television network and media company
- GRES Mocidade Independente de Padre Miguel, Brazilian samba school from Rio de Janeiro city
- Serra Macaense Futebol Clube (founded as Independente Esportes Clube Macaé), Brazilian football club from Macaé, Rio de Janeiro
- Palmeiras Nordeste Futebol (founded as Associação Atlética Independente), former Brazilian football club from Feira de Santana, Bahia

== See also ==
- Independent (disambiguation)
