= Return of the Wolves =

The Return of the Wolves ('Die Rückkehr der Wölfe')
- Directed by: Thomas Horat
- Written by: Thomas Horat
- Produced by: Salome Pitschen; Urs Augstburger
- Cinematography: Luzius Wespe; Lukas Gut
- Edited by: Guido Henseler
- Music by: Artra Trio
- Production company: mythenfilm
- Release date: 2019
- Running time: 90 minutes
- Country: Switzerland
- Languages: Swiss German; German; English; Bulgarian

Return of the Wolves (Original title: Die Rückkehr der Wölfe) is a 2019 Swiss documentary film directed by Thomas Horat. The film explores the return of wolves to Europe after their near extinction in the 19th century and documents the social, political, and ecological debates surrounding their reappearance.

== Synopsis ==
During the 19th century, wolves were exterminated in large parts of Europe, having been regarded as dangerous predators causing significant damage. In recent decades, wolves have gradually returned to their former habitats, sparking controversy. The film documents this debate at various locations across Europe and the United States, presenting differing perspectives on wildlife conservation, agriculture, and coexistence with large predators.

== Production ==
The film was shot between the summer of 2016 and the summer of 2019 at numerous locations in Europe and the United States. Filming locations included Ernstbrunn and the Salzburg region in Austria; the Rila Mountains and Vlahi in Bulgaria; Lusatia in Germany; the Calanda massif, the Eriz Valley, Valle Morobbia, and the Canton of Valais in Switzerland; Ely, Minnesota, and the Minneapolis–Saint Paul metropolitan area in the United States; as well as Silesia and Warsaw in Poland. Animation was created in the Basque Country by animator Kote Camacho.

== Funding ==
The film had a budget of CHF 340,000 and was supported by several institutions, including Swiss Radio and Television (SRF), Pro Natura, the cultural offices of the cantons of Schwyz and Lucerne, the Cultural Promotion Office of the Canton of Graubünden/SWISSLOS, the Markant Foundation, the Temperatio Foundation, the Ernst Göhner Foundation, the Swiss Life Foundation “Perspectives”, Succès passage antenne, Succès Cinéma, and 3sat Switzerland.

== Festival screenings ==
- Bend Film Festival 2020 – Special Jury Award for Environmental Insight
- FilmFestival Cottbus 2019
- 55th Solothurn Film Festival 2020
- Filmkunstfest Mecklenburg-Vorpommern 2020
- Der neue Heimatfilm (New Heimat Film Festival) 2020

== Reception ==
The return of wolves is a controversial topic in the Alpine region. Since its release in October 2019, the film has received recurring media attention regarding the public debate.
