= Mullett Arena =

Venue in Tempe, Arizona

- "The Mullett" "The Party Barn"

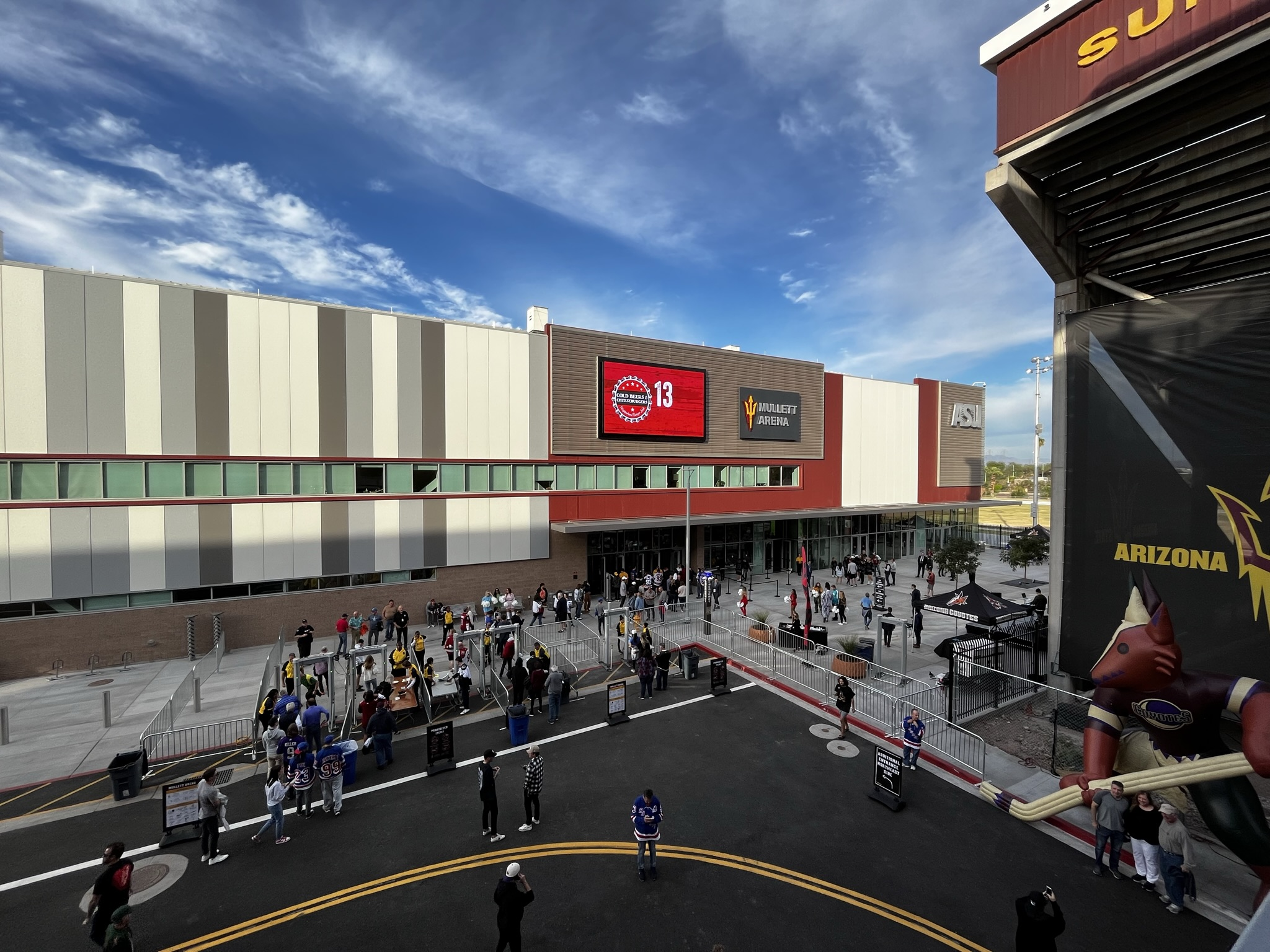
- Mullett Arena in 2022

- Location in Maricopa County Location in Arizona Location in USA
- Interactive map of Mullett Arena
- Former names: ASU Multi-Purpose Arena (planning/construction)
- Address: 411 S Packard Drive
- Location: Tempe, Arizona, U.S.
- Coordinates: 33°25′36″N 111°55′43″W
- Owner: Arizona State University
- Operator: Oak View Group
- Capacity: NCAA hockey: 5,000; NHL hockey: 4,600
- Public transit: Veterans Way/College Ave; Marina Heights/Rio Salado Pkwy

Construction
- Groundbreaking: January 2021
- Built: October 1, 2022
- Opened: October 12, 2022
- Cost: US$134 million
- Architect: SCI Architects
- Builder: Mortenson Construction

Tenants
- Arizona State Sun Devils men's ice hockey (NCAA) 2022–present Arizona State Sun Devils women's ice hockey (ACHA) 2022–present Arizona State Sun Devils women's gymnastics (NCAA) 2022–present Arizona State Sun Devils men's wrestling (NCAA) 2022–present Arizona State Sun Devils women's volleyball (NCAA) 2023–present Arizona Coyotes (NHL) 2022–2024; Valley Suns (NBAGL) 2024–present Arizona Juggernauts (IAL) 2026–present

Website
- mullettarena.com

Mullett Arena (originally ASU Multi-Purpose Arena) is an indoor multipurpose arena at Arizona State University in Tempe, Arizona.

The 5,000-seat arena is the home of the men's ice hockey, women's ice hockey, women's volleyball, and men's wrestling teams as well as the NBA G League's Valley Suns. It served as a temporary venue for the National Hockey League's Arizona Coyotes from 2022 to 2024, with seating capacity for NHL games capped at 4,600. The facility is owned by Arizona State University and managed by Oak View Group.

== History ==
In November 2020, the Arizona Board of Regents' finance committee approved plans for a new 5,000-seat on-campus multipurpose arena, which replaced the privately operated Oceanside Ice Arena, which had been leased by the university long-term, as the Sun Devils men's hockey facility starting in 2022. Originally known as the Multi-Purpose Arena, it is also used for women's hockey, men's wrestling, women's volleyball, and community hockey events.

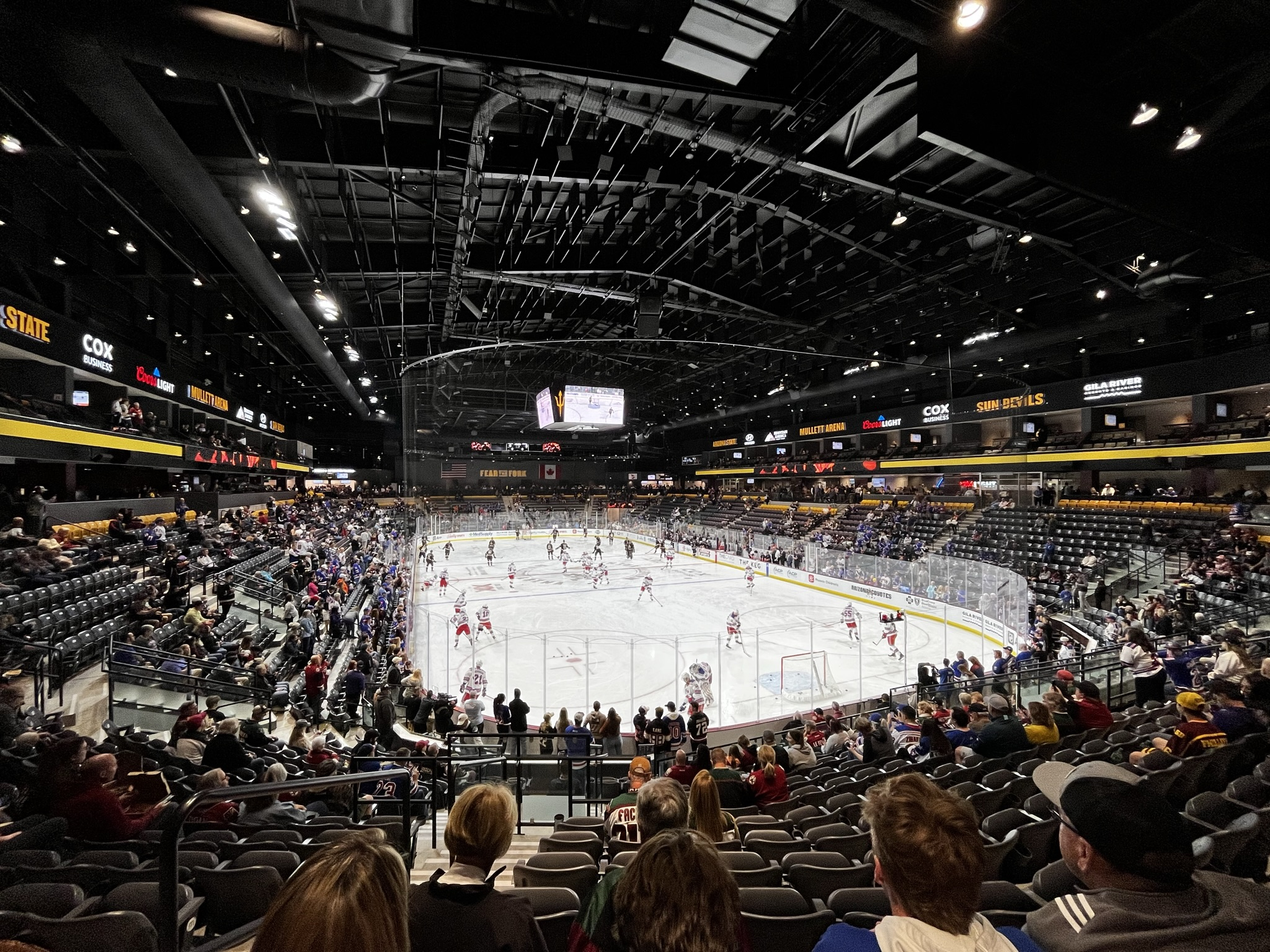
Mullett Arena from the east end before an Arizona Coyotes game

With their lease agreement at Gila River Arena expiring after the 2021–22 NHL season, the Arizona Coyotes were in talks by January 2022 with Arizona State University to temporarily use the ASU facility for what was to be their next three to four NHL seasons. On February 10, 2022, the Coyotes signed what was to be a three-year agreement to play their home games at ASU's facility, beginning with the 2022–23 NHL season. The additional cost of completing the arena to accommodate the Coyotes was approximately $19.7 million, which was paid for by the team. During the Coyotes' short tenure in the building, it officially had the lowest permanent seating capacity in the NHL in the modern-day era.

On August 23, 2022, Arizona State University unveiled the new facility name as Mullett Arena. It is in honor of Donald and Barbara Mullett, two of the university's benefactors.

On October 14, 2022, the Sun Devils men's hockey team played their first ever game at the arena against the Colgate Raiders. Josh Doan (son of former Coyote Shane Doan) scored the first ever goal in Mullett Arena history. The Sun Devils won the game, 2–0.

Two weeks later (October 28, 2022), the Coyotes' first ever game in front of a sellout crowd of 4,600 at Mullett Arena resulted in a 3–2 overtime loss to the Winnipeg Jets. Christian Fischer scored the first and second NHL goals at the arena.

On April 17, 2024, the Coyotes played their final game at the arena against the Edmonton Oilers, where fans in attendance wore white for a final Whiteout, a considered playoff tradition for the franchise. The Coyotes won the game 5–2, with the final goal at the arena being scored by Sean Durzi. Following that game's conclusion, the Coyotes were revealed to have agreed to suspend operations for a five-year period of time (thus ending their lease prematurely), with many of their assets moving to Utah to become a new, technically expansion Utah Hockey Club (now known as the Utah Mammoth), but in June, the Coyotes franchise would more or less cease operations following the cancellation of a land auction that team owner Alex Meruelo was planning on winning during that month for the team.

On May 22, 2024, it was announced that the Valley Suns, the NBA G League affiliate of the Phoenix Suns, will play their home games at the Mullett Arena starting in the 2024–25 NBA G League season. The Valley Suns would make their home debut on November 11, 2024, against the Stockton Kings after splitting their first two road games against the Santa Cruz Warriors, winning their home debut 108–100. Two-way contract player Jalen Bridges led the team in scoring in their home debut with 24 points that night. Another two-way contract player in TyTy Washington Jr. had 20 of his friends and family cheering him on during that game due to him being a local player.

On February 28, 2026, Real American Freestyle presented RAF 06 from the venue, an event that was broadcast live on Fox Nation.

== Mountain America Community Iceplex at ASU ==
Arizona State University announced on March 3, 2022, a multiyear naming rights partnership with Mountain America Credit Union for the ice rink on the west side of Mullett Arena. Officially named as the Mountain America Community Iceplex at ASU, it has a concession stand for hot and cold refreshments and a full hockey pro shop.

For the first four Coyotes home games, temporary locker room accommodations were set up within the confines of the Mountain America Community Iceplex for the visiting teams. The Winnipeg Jets, New York Rangers, Florida Panthers and Dallas Stars used this location during that opening Coyotes homestand. After that, the Coyotes began a franchise record 14-game long road trip while ongoing construction of the annex was officially completed in time for their next scheduled home game (December 9, 2022, against the Boston Bruins). The building housed all of the on-site NHL training and locker room facilities during the Coyotes' temporary stay at the Mullett Arena.

Events and tenants
Preceded by Oceanside Ice Arena	Home of the Arizona State Sun Devils men's hockey 2022 – present	Succeeded by Incumbent
Preceded by Oceanside Ice Arena	Home of the Arizona State Sun Devils women's hockey 2022 – present	Succeeded by Incumbent
Preceded by Desert Financial Arena	Home of the Arizona State Sun Devils women's gymnastics 2022 – present	Succeeded by Incumbent
Preceded by Desert Financial Arena	Home of the Arizona State Sun Devils men's wrestling 2022 – present	Succeeded by Incumbent
Preceded by Gila River Arena	Home of the Arizona Coyotes; 2022 – 2024	Succeeded by Last arena
Preceded by Franchise established	Home of the Valley Suns; 2024 – present	Succeeded by Incumbent
