= The Independents =

The Independents may refer to:

== Politics ==
- The Independents (Austria), a defunct political party 1998–1999
- The Independents – Republic and Territories group, a French parliamentary group
- The Independents (Liechtenstein) (Die Unabhängigen), a political party
- The Independents (UK), a defunct group of independent MPs in 2019
- Independent politician, not affiliated with any political party

== Entertainment and media ==
- The Independents (band), an American horror-punk/ska band
- The Independents (film), a 2018 American film by Greg Naughton
- The Independents (vocal group), an American R&B group 1971–1975

== See also ==
- The Independent (disambiguation)
