= Asisko Urmeneta =

Spanish cartoonist (born 1965)

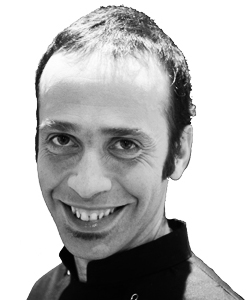
- Born: 1965 (age 60–61); Pamplona
- Occupation: Comic artist
- Writing career
- Language: Basque

Asisko Urmeneta Otsoa Irati (born 1965) is a Navarrese comic strip writer and graffiti artist. He usually works in the Basque language.

He was born in Pamplona.

In the blog "Kebawe", they present "Kleptomaniac, Passive Smoker, Microcephalic, fan of Sours Aire, bi-sexual and controversial Protestant.

== Career ==
Asisko Urmeneta, interview at Argia 2017

His first steps as a comic book author came in Napartheid. Afterwards, he made several press collaborations (mainly in Argia). He is a member of the Zazpiak Batman collective. He participates in the satirical magazine H28, and also draws for the magazine Xabiroi Ikastolen Elkartea.

He was doing caricatures for the ETB1 television channel. Together with Juanjo Elordi he directed the film Gartxot, konkista aitzineko konkista (2011).

In 2017 and 2018 Asisko Urmeneta created two comics: Eusklabo Alaiak (Gure Berriak, 2017) and AztiHitza: Xahoren Biografikoa (Erroa argitaletxea, 2018). Thanks to this latest work, Urmeneta won the Euskadi Prize for Literature in 2019 in the category of Illustration of Literary Work.

== Selected bibliography ==
- Hegoekialde Urruneko Legenda (Napartheid, 1988)
- Erraondo (TT komikiak, 1991).
- I'm Pellot, Biba festa! (Argia, 1996).
- Sugea lilipean (Desclée de Brouwer, 2003).
- Gartxot (Argia, 2003). In collaboration with Jokin and Marc Armspach (Marko).
- Okatxu hegal egiten (Argia, 2010). In collaboration with Mattin Irigoien and Adur Larrea.
- He has participated in the book Altza porru by Jakoba Errekondo (Argia, 2016) along with other cartoonists: Ainara Azpiazu, Antton Olariaga, Mattin Martiarena, Unai Gaztelumendi, Unai Iturriaga, Joseba Larratxe and Zaldieroa.
- Eusklabo Alaiak (Gureberriak, 2017).
- AztiHitza: Xahoren Biografikoa (Erroa argitaletxea. 2018).
- 1620, Nafarroa Beheregaina (Nabarralde Fundazioa, 2019).
