= Independentea =

Basque-language news outlet

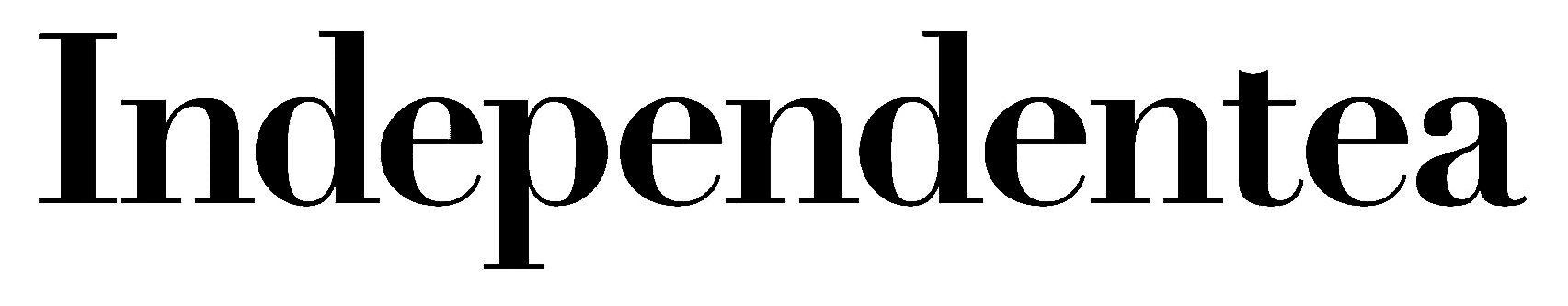

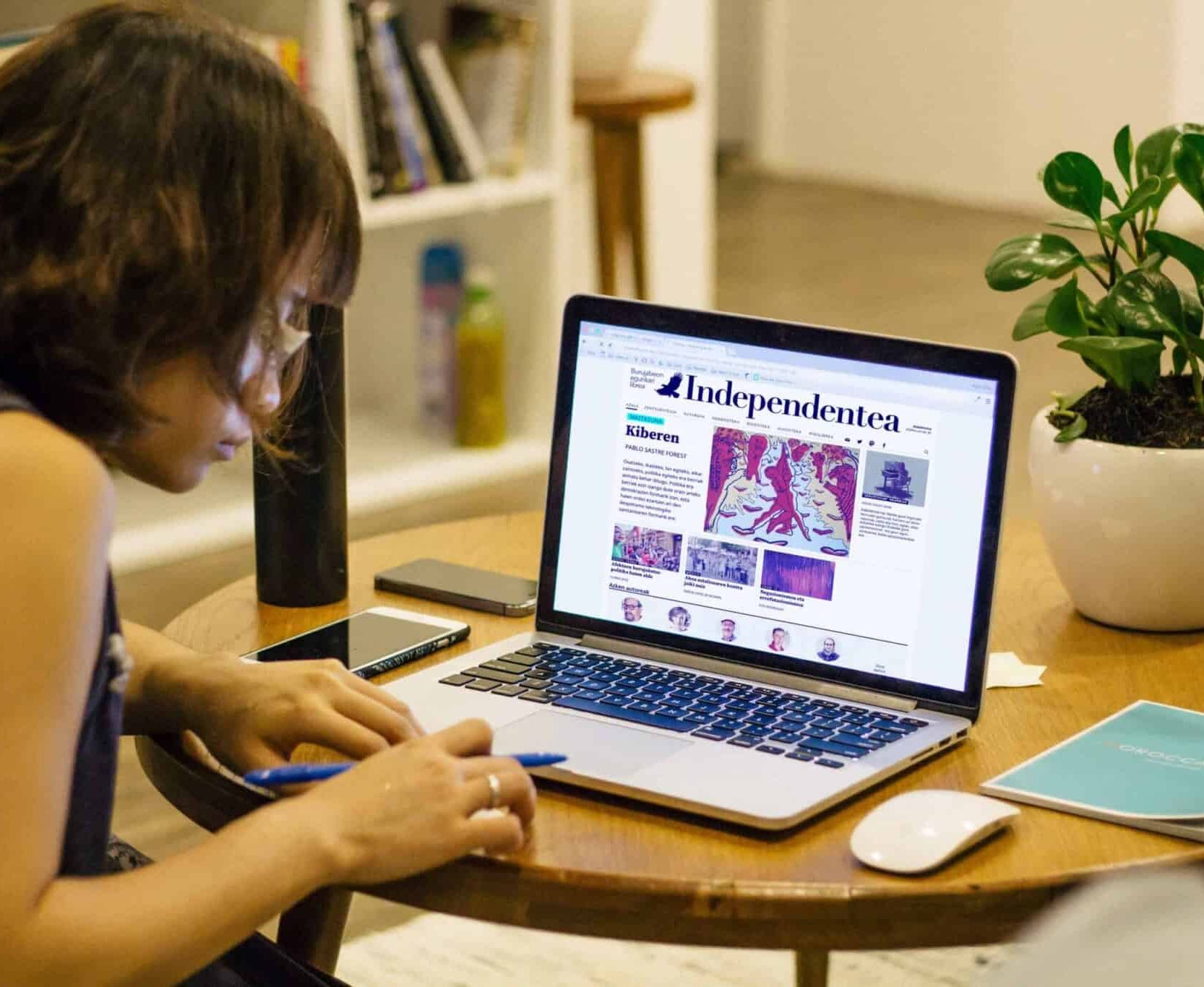
- Independentea, Egunkari Librea (Literally 'The Independent, The Free Journal')
- Native name: Independentea
- Website type: Daily newspaper online
- Available in: Basque language
- Founded: August 2020
- Headquarters: Basque Country
- Country of origin: Basque Country
- Area served: Basque Country
- Owners: Independentearen Lagunak
- Creator: Komiki Films
- Editors: Ihintza Tellabide Amunarriz, Irati Larreta Mujika, Kote Camacho
- Key people: Fito Rodriguez, Pablo Sastre Forest, Jasone Iroz, Aitor Unanue, Asel Luzarraga, Juan Martin Elexpuru, Asier Bastarrika, Christian Reinicke, Zigor Garro, Itsaso Güemes, Gorka Setien Berakoetxea, Iñaki Segurola
- Website: independentea.eus
- Launched: 29 October 2020
- Written in: Basque-language

Independentea.eus or simply Independentea (literally 'The Independent') is a Basque-language independent digital news outlet created in year 2020 in Euskal Herria —the Basque Country— in a collaboration between independent artists and authors, in response to the technocratic totalitarian drift that the world acquired in year 2020 and because of the need to think freely in euskara, the Basque language. The journal describes itself as a space for independent Basque journalism, aiming to publish articles, books, commentary, and multimedia content outside the influence of political institutions, mainstream media conglomerates, and big industrial pressures.

== Editorial approach ==
Independentea presents itself as an independent and free news source committed to what it describes as "burujabe" ("sovereign," or independent) journalism. Its editorial content includes news, opinion pieces, investigative reports, and commentary on topics such as social issues, culture, technology, civil liberties, and political matters. The outlet publishes materials that its contributors view as under-reported or overlooked by mainstream media. The site features categories covering history, societal analysis, political discourse, and critical reflections on topics like state surveillance and civil rights. Its content often reflects a critical perspective on established power structures and promotes alternative viewpoints.

== Social outreach ==
The journal site Independentea.eus daily renews its front page, every morning usually at 9 a.m., and it maintains an active presence on social media platforms and community channels, including activity on Mastodon, where it describes itself as a platform for grassroots, independent citizen journalism. Also Telegram, Whatsapp, Bluesky and Facebook, and others, where it daily shares links and updates about new content, X (formerly Twitter) accounts used to circulate articles and engage readers, and a YouTube presence, indicating multimedia publication efforts. Independentea also publishes physically sporadic news magazines and books such as Dr. Angel Bidaurrazaga van Dierdonck's Distopia Baten Kronika, —'Chronics of a Distopy'—, which are co-edited and locally presented to the public by their authors themselves.

== Philosophy ==
The outlet's name and mission emphasize editorial independence (Independentea means "the independent" in Basque), signaling an intent to operate free from institutional affiliations or influence. It positions itself as a space for voices and analyses that may not find space in big commercial or state-finance conditioned media. Therefore Independentea's articles, either news reports or opinion articles, in any case, always show a clear authorship and motive of each and every piece of news or opinion given.

== Notability ==
Third-party coverage in Basque media notes Independentea as part of a broader ecosystem of Basque-language digital journalism. Its creation in 2020 was framed as a response to perceptions of bias or limitations in existing media outlets and a desire among readers for alternative news platforms.

== Repression ==
Independentea, with its open approach, generated hope and relief to its diverse Basque readership, as readers and authors widely expressed in articles and comments. However, at the same time the outlet's creators, editors and authors are severely and continuously harassed through smear campaigns and continue to face cyberbullying.

To this day, Independentea continues to publish daily.
