= Independents (artist group) =

The Independents were a group of modernist painters based in the New Hope, Pennsylvania, area of the United States during the early 1930s. They evolved out of The New Group (founded in 1930), a collection of artists dissatisfied with the hold that "conservative" Pennsylvania Impressionists had on local exhibitions.

Members of the Independents included Peter Keenan, Robert Hogue, R.A.D. Miller, Charles Evans, Henry Baker, Ralston Crawford, Charles Frederic Ramsey, and Faye Swengel Badura.
