= L'Indépendant (Luxembourg) =

Luxembourgish newspaper

- Founded: 6 September 1945
- Language: French

L'Indépendant (French pronunciation: [lɛ̃depɑ̃dɑ̃]) is a French-language newspaper published in Luxembourg founded on 6 September 1945 by Norbert Gomand.
