= Oceanside Ice Arena =

Venue in Tempe, Arizona

Coordinates: 33.447277°N 111.911242°W

- "The Side"
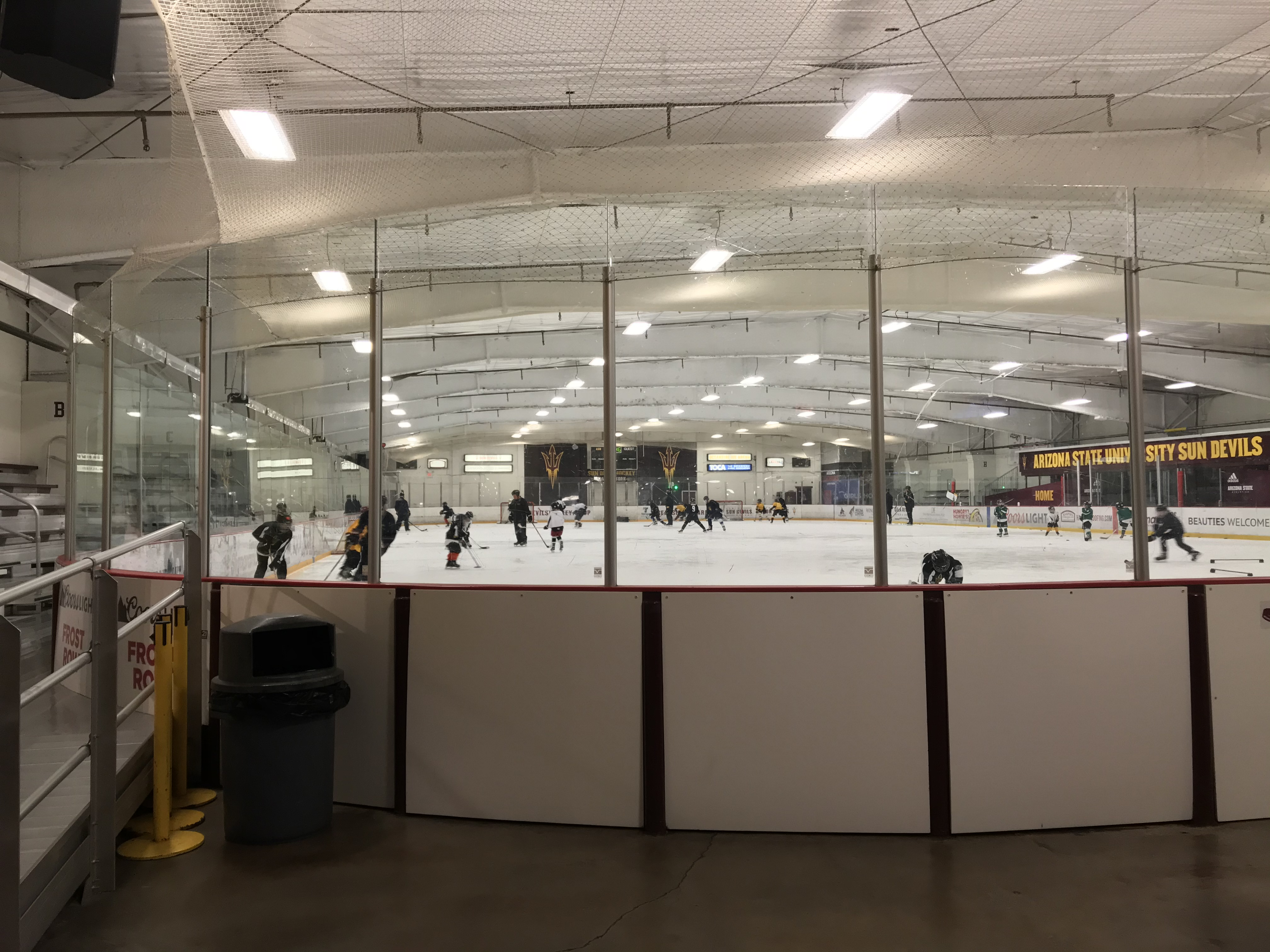
- Interactive map of Oceanside Ice Arena
- Former names: Big Skate (1974-1975)
- Location: 1520 North McClintock Drive; Tempe, Arizona
- Owner: Overton Moore Properties
- Operator: Desert Youth Hockey Association
- Capacity: 747
- Surface: 200' x 90'

Construction
- Opened: 1974
- Closed: March 19th, 2023
- Demolished: March–April 2023

Tenants
- Desert Youth Hockey Association - Jr Sun Devils/Phoenix Firebirds (1975-2023); Arizona State Sun Devils men's ice hockey (1979–2022); Arizona State Sun Devils women's ice hockey (2016–2022)

Oceanside Ice Arena was an ice arena and skating center in Tempe, Arizona. It served as the home of the Desert Youth Hockey Association from 1975 to 2023 and formerly Arizona State Sun Devils men's and women's hockey; the Arizona State Men's program had been at Oceanside since 1979.

== Naming ==
Oceanside's original name was Big Skate to match the adjacent waterpark "Big Surf" and to match the never built tennis court "Big Serve" before it was changed to Oceanside sometime before opening to match the west coast theming of the sports complex.

== History ==
Oceanside Ice Arena opened in 1974. The arena was home to Desert Youth Hockey Association since 1975 and the Arizona State University hockey program since its inception in 1979. During that range of time, the Sun Devils evolved from an unofficial club team playing in an arid area without much interest in ice sports, to the Division I level in the 2015–16 season in a fast developing Sun Belt metropolis, requiring upgrades to bring the arena up to NCAA standards.

In 1976, to capitalize on the popularity of the movie Saturday Night Fever, the teen disco, "The Rock Hop" was hired to play every Saturday night between 1976 and 1980 except for summers, which moved the teen dance parties next door to the Big Surf water park on Friday nights. A $2.50 Dance and Skate party smashed attendance records for the ice rink, as 1/4 of the ice was covered with a plywood dance floor, and a temporary retaining wall was bolted across the border between the ice and the plywood floor. Attendance was so high that at times, the ice had to be cleared to refreeze, as the heat from all the people dancing and skating would melt the ice.

In 2015 Oceanside went under a $250,000 renovation to help standardize the rink.

In November 2020, the Arizona Board of Regents' finance committee approved plans to construct a new, 5,000-seat indoor arena on-campus near Desert Financial Arena, which will replace Oceanside as the Sun Devils men's home arena starting in 2022.

On March 16, 2022, the Sun Devil's men's team played their final game at Oceanside, beating the LIU Sharks men's ice hockey team 5-1, the final goal being scored by senior Christopher Grando.

On April 12, 2022, Oceanside and the neighboring water park, Big Surf, were sold to Overton Moore Properties, a real estate developer, putting the rink's future into question.

The Arena was closed on March 19, 2023 with demolition beginning the following day, March 20, and completed by June 2023. The land has since been redeveloped into a 36-acre industrial park.

Preceded by None	Home of Arizona State Sun Devils men's hockey 1979–2022	Succeeded by Mullett Arena
Preceded by None	Home of Arizona State Sun Devils women's hockey 2016–2022	Succeeded by Mullett Arena
