= The Independents (band) =

American horror-punk/ska band

- Origin: South Carolina
- Genres: Horror punk, ska
- Years active: 1992–present
- Labels: Suki
- Members: Evil Presly; Willy B.
- Past members: Bones; Blackie Levay; Matt Hunter; Pugs; Steve Stone; Vivian; Maggot; Evan; Phillip; Scott Boyce
- Website: theindependents.net

The Independents are a horror-punk/ska band from Myrtle Beach and Florence, South Carolina.

== Biography ==
The Independents are an American horror-punk/ska band formed in Florence, South Carolina in 1992 by Evil Presly and Willy B. Their first recording was a four-song demo recorded in 1992 at the Jam Room in Columbia, South Carolina which they duplicated onto approximately 260 cassettes using a home stereo. Evil personally sold these while tour managing the South Carolina band 49 Reasons during their first US Tour. In October 1995, Rockduster Records released the band's debut album In for the Kill.

From their beginning, the band was championed by Ramones vocalist Joey Ramone. In 1998, Ramone served as executive producer on their EP Unholy Living Dead. That year, they also played dates on the Warped Tour. Ramone would manage the band until his death in 2001. The band's 2001 album, Back from the Grave, was produced by Ramone and Ramones producer Daniel Rey.

In 2004, the band was involved in a van crash while touring England with The Dangerfields. Willy B broke his arm in several places and the remaining dates were cancelled, but they returned in 2007 for a full European tour.

The Independents released the album Do It Again in 2008. Leading up to the album's release, they toured with The Queers, as well as headlining their own tours. They have also played select shows in the US with bands The Misfits, Flogging Molly, Blink 182, Cheap Trick and Mustard Plug. The Independents have also toured with the Voodoo Glow Skulls on many occasions.

In 2014 The Independents released their CD Into The Light, their first full-length CD since 2008's Do it Again. Although there were no official releases between the years of 2008 and 2014, with the exception of Ho Ho Ho...What A Party in 2013, the band continued to perform throughout the United States and Canada. In late 2014, the Independents released a limited edition live CD titled Live In Kansas City 10/30/2014 as part of a merchandise package deal. The CD also contained the 'Ho Ho Ho...What a Party demos. They also released a split 7-inch with Potbelly on Snatchee Records.

== Discography ==
=== Studio albums ===
Year	Album
1995	In for the Kill
2001	Back from the Grave
2003	Live from Murder Beach
2005	Eternal Bond
2006	The Early Years Demos 1993-1997
2008	Do it Again
2014	Into The Light

=== EPs ===
Year	Album
1996	Stalker
1998	The Independents (7-inch vinyl record, Hellcat Records)
1999	Unholy Living Dead
2004	Full Moon Arise
2013	"Ho Ho Ho, What A Party" Demos
