= List of Tampa Bay Lightning award winners =

Tampa Bay Lightning awards
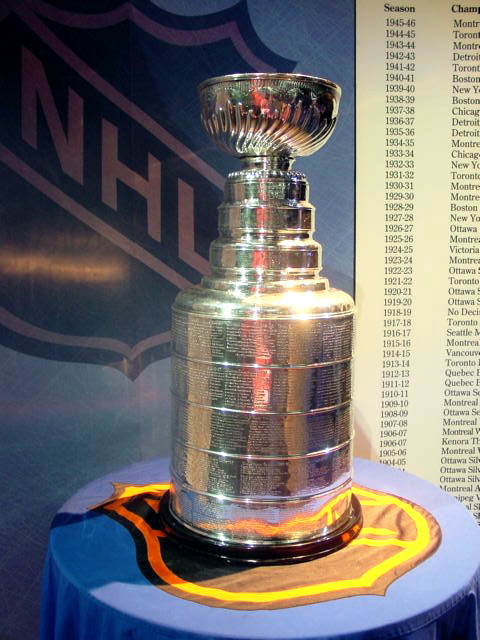
- The Tampa Bay Lightning have won the Stanley Cup (above) thrice.

Team trophies
- Award*: Wins
- Stanley Cup: 3
- Prince of Wales Trophy: 5
- Presidents' Trophy: 1

Individual awards
- Award*: Wins
- Art Ross Trophy: 5
- Bill Masterton Memorial Trophy: 1
- Conn Smythe Trophy: 3
- General Manager of the Year Award: 1
- Hart Memorial Trophy: 3
- Jack Adams Award: 2
- James Norris Memorial Trophy: 1
- King Clancy Memorial Trophy: 1
- Lady Byng Memorial Trophy: 4
- Mark Messier Leadership Award: 1
- Maurice "Rocket" Richard Trophy: 3
- NHL Foundation Player Award: 1
- NHL Plus-Minus Award: 1
- Ted Lindsay Award: 3
- Vezina Trophy: 2

Total
- Awards won: 41

This is a list of Tampa Bay Lightning award winners.

== League awards ==
=== Team trophies ===
Team trophies awarded to the Tampa Bay Lightning
| Award | Description | Times won | Seasons | References |
|---|---|---|---|---|
| Stanley Cup | NHL championship | 3 | 2003–04, 2019–20, 2020–21 | |
| Presidents' Trophy | Team with the best regular season record | 1 | 2018–19 | |
| Prince of Wales Trophy | Eastern Conference playoff championship (1993–2020; 2021–present) | 4 | 2003–04, 2014–15, 2019–20, 2021–22 | |
| Prince of Wales Trophy | NHL semifinal championship (2020–21) | 1 | 2020–21 | |

=== Individual awards ===
Individual awards won by Tampa Bay Lightning players and staff
| Award | Description | Winner | Season | References |
|---|---|---|---|---|
| Art Ross Trophy | Regular season scoring champion | Martin St. Louis | 2003–04 | |
| Art Ross Trophy | Regular season scoring champion | Martin St. Louis | 2012–13 | |
| Art Ross Trophy | Regular season scoring champion | Nikita Kucherov | 2018–19 | |
| Art Ross Trophy | Regular season scoring champion | Nikita Kucherov | 2023–24 | |
| Art Ross Trophy | Regular season scoring champion | Nikita Kucherov | 2024–25 | |
| Bill Masterton Memorial Trophy | Perseverance, sportsmanship and dedication to hockey | John Cullen | 1998–99 | |
| Conn Smythe Trophy | Most valuable player of the playoffs | Brad Richards | 2003–04 | |
| Conn Smythe Trophy | Most valuable player of the playoffs | Victor Hedman | 2019–20 | |
| Conn Smythe Trophy | Most valuable player of the playoffs | Andrei Vasilevskiy | 2020–21 | |
| Hart Memorial Trophy | Most valuable player to his team during the regular season | Martin St. Louis | 2003–04 | |
| Hart Memorial Trophy | Most valuable player to his team during the regular season | Nikita Kucherov | 2018–19 | |
| Hart Memorial Trophy | Most valuable player to his team during the regular season | Nikita Kucherov | 2025–26 | |
| Jack Adams Award | Top coach during the regular season | John Tortorella | 2003–04 | |
| Jack Adams Award | Top coach during the regular season | Jon Cooper | 2025–26 | |
| James Norris Memorial Trophy | Top defenseman during the regular season | Victor Hedman | 2017–18 | |
| Jim Gregory General Manager of the Year Award | Top general manager | Steve Yzerman | 2014–15 | |
| King Clancy Memorial Trophy | Leadership qualities on and off the ice and humanitarian contributions within their community | Vincent Lecavalier | 2007–08 | |
| Lady Byng Memorial Trophy | Gentlemanly conduct | Brad Richards | 2003–04 | |
| Lady Byng Memorial Trophy | Gentlemanly conduct | Martin St. Louis | 2009–10 | |
| Lady Byng Memorial Trophy | Gentlemanly conduct | Martin St. Louis | 2010–11 | |
| Lady Byng Memorial Trophy | Gentlemanly conduct | Martin St. Louis | 2012–13 | |
| Mark Messier Leadership Award | Leadership and contributions to society | Steven Stamkos | 2022–23 | |
| Maurice "Rocket" Richard Trophy | Most goals in the regular season | Vincent Lecavalier | 2006–07 | |
| Maurice "Rocket" Richard Trophy | Most goals in the regular season | Steven Stamkos | 2009–10 (Note: Shared with Sidney Crosby of the Pittsburgh Penguins.) | |
| Maurice "Rocket" Richard Trophy | Most goals in the regular season | Steven Stamkos | 2011–12 | |
| NHL Foundation Player Award | Community service | Vincent Lecavalier | 2007–08 | |
| NHL Plus-Minus Award | Highest plus/minus | Martin St. Louis | 2003–04 | |
| Ted Lindsay Award | Most valuable player as chosen by the players | Martin St. Louis | 2003–04 | |
| Ted Lindsay Award | Most valuable player as chosen by the players | Nikita Kucherov | 2018–19 | |
| Ted Lindsay Award | Most valuable player as chosen by the players | Nikita Kucherov | 2024–25 | |
| Vezina Trophy | Top goaltender | Andrei Vasilevskiy | 2018–19 | |
| Vezina Trophy | Top goaltender | Andrei Vasilevskiy | 2025–26 | |

== All-Stars ==
=== NHL first and second team All-Stars ===
The NHL first and second team All-Stars are the top players at each position as voted on by the Professional Hockey Writers' Association.

Tampa Bay Lightning selected to the NHL First and Second Team All-Stars
| Player | Position | Selections | Season | Team |
|---|---|---|---|---|
| Ben Bishop | Goaltender | 1 | 2015–16 | 2nd |
| Dan Boyle | Defense | 1 | 2006–07 | 2nd |
| Brandon Hagel | Left wing | 1 | 2024–25 | 2nd |
| Victor Hedman | Defense | 7 | 2016–17 | 2nd |
| Victor Hedman | Defense | 7 | 2017–18 | 1st |
| Victor Hedman | Defense | 7 | 2018–19 | 2nd |
| Victor Hedman | Defense | 7 | 2019–20 | 2nd |
| Victor Hedman | Defense | 7 | 2020–21 | 2nd |
| Victor Hedman | Defense | 7 | 2021–22 | 2nd |
| Victor Hedman | Defense | 7 | 2024–25 | 2nd |
| Nikita Kucherov | Right wing | 7 | 2016–17 | 2nd |
| Nikita Kucherov | Right wing | 7 | 2017–18 | 1st |
| Nikita Kucherov | Right wing | 7 | 2018–19 | 1st |
| Nikita Kucherov | Right wing | 7 | 2019–20 | 2nd |
| Nikita Kucherov | Right wing | 7 | 2023–24 | 1st |
| Nikita Kucherov | Right wing | 7 | 2024–25 | 1st |
| Nikita Kucherov | Right wing | 7 | 2025–26 | 1st |
| Vincent Lecavalier | Center | 1 | 2006–07 | 2nd |
| Martin St. Louis | Right wing | 5 | 2003–04 | 1st |
| Martin St. Louis | Right wing | 5 | 2006–07 | 2nd |
| Martin St. Louis | Right wing | 5 | 2009–10 | 2nd |
| Martin St. Louis | Right wing | 5 | 2010–11 | 2nd |
| Martin St. Louis | Right wing | 5 | 2012–13 | 2nd |
| Steven Stamkos | Center | 2 | 2010–11 | 2nd |
| Steven Stamkos | Center | 2 | 2011–12 | 2nd |
| Andrei Vasilevskiy | Goaltender | 4 | 2018–19 | 1st |
| Andrei Vasilevskiy | Goaltender | 4 | 2020–21 | 1st |
| Andrei Vasilevskiy | Goaltender | 4 | 2024–25 | 2nd |
| Andrei Vasilevskiy | Goaltender | 4 | 2025–26 | 1st |

=== NHL All-Rookie Team ===
The NHL All-Rookie Team consists of the top rookies at each position as voted on by the Professional Hockey Writers' Association.

Tampa Bay Lightning selected to the NHL All-Rookie Team
| Player | Position | Season |
|---|---|---|
| Anthony Cirelli | Forward | 2018–19 |
| Tyler Johnson | Forward | 2013–14 |
| Ondrej Palat | Forward | 2013–14 |
| Brad Richards | Forward | 2000–01 |

=== All-Star Game selections ===
The National Hockey League All-Star Game is a mid-season exhibition game held annually between many of the top players of each season. Twenty-one All-Star Games have been held since the Tampa Bay Lightning entered the league in 1992, with at least one player chosen to represent the Lightning in each year except 1998. The All-Star game has not been held in various years: 1979 and 1987 due to the 1979 Challenge Cup and Rendez-vous '87 series between the NHL and the Soviet national team, respectively, 1995, 2005, and 2013 as a result of labor stoppages, 2006, 2010, 2014 and 2026 because of the Winter Olympic Games, 2021 as a result of the COVID-19 pandemic, and 2025 when it was replaced by the 2025 4 Nations Face-Off. Tampa Bay has hosted two All-Star games. The first was the 49th, which took place at the Ice Palace Arena. The second was the 63rd National Hockey League All-Star Game, which took place at Amalie Arena.

- † Selected by fan vote
- # Selected as one of four "last men in" by fan vote

Tampa Bay Lightning players and coaches selected to the All-Star Game
| Game | Year | Name | Position | References |
|---|---|---|---|---|
| 44th | 1993 | Brian Bradley | Center | |
| 45th | 1994 | Brian Bradley | Center | |
| 46th | 1996 | Roman Hamrlik | Defense | |
| 47th | 1997 | Dino Ciccarelli† | Right wing | |
| 48th | 1998 | No Lightning selected | — | |
| 49th | 1999 | Wendel Clark | Left wing | |
| 50th | 2000 | Petr Svoboda | Defense | |
| 51st | 2001 | Fredrik Modin | Left wing | |
| 52nd | 2002 | Nikolai Khabibulin | Goaltender | |
| 53rd | 2003 | Nikolai Khabibulin† | Goaltender | |
| 53rd | 2003 | Vincent Lecavalier | Center | |
| 53rd | 2003 | Martin St. Louis | Right wing | |
| 54th | 2004 | Pavel Kubina | Defense | |
| 54th | 2004 | Martin St. Louis† | Right wing | |
| 55th | 2007 | Vincent Lecavalier | Center | |
| 55th | 2007 | Martin St. Louis | Right wing | |
| 56th | 2008 | Vincent Lecavalier† | Center | |
| 56th | 2008 | Martin St. Louis | Right wing | |
| 57th | 2009 | Vincent Lecavalier | Center | |
| 57th | 2009 | Martin St. Louis | Right wing | |
| 58th | 2011 | Martin St. Louis | Right wing | |
| 58th | 2011 | Steven Stamkos | Center | |
| 59th | 2012 | Steven Stamkos | Center | |
| 60th | 2015 | Tyler Johnson (Did not play) | Center | |
| 60th | 2015 | Steven Stamkos | Center | |
| 61st | 2016 | Ben Bishop | Goaltender | |
| 61st | 2016 | Steven Stamkos | Center | |
| 62nd | 2017 | Victor Hedman | Defense | |
| 62nd | 2017 | Nikita Kucherov | Right wing | |
| 63rd | 2018 | Jon Cooper | Coach | |
| 63rd | 2018 | Victor Hedman (Did not play) | Defense | |
| 63rd | 2018 | Nikita Kucherov | Right wing | |
| 63rd | 2018 | Brayden Point (Replaced Hedman) | Center | |
| 63rd | 2018 | Steven Stamkos† | Center | |
| 63rd | 2018 | Andrei Vasilevskiy | Goaltender | |
| 64th | 2019 | Jon Cooper | Coach | |
| 64th | 2019 | Nikita Kucherov | Right wing | |
| 64th | 2019 | Steven Stamkos | Center | |
| 64th | 2019 | Andrei Vasilevskiy (Replaced Carey Price) | Goaltender | |
| 65th | 2020 | Victor Hedman | Defense | |
| 65th | 2020 | Andrei Vasilevskiy (Replaced Tuukka Rask) | Goaltender | |
| 66th | 2022 | Victor Hedman | Defense | |
| 66th | 2022 | Steven Stamkos# | Center | |
| 66th | 2022 | Andrei Vasilevskiy | Goaltender | |
| 67th | 2023 | Nikita Kucherov | Right wing | |
| 67th | 2023 | Andrei Vasilevskiy† | Goaltender | |
| 68th | 2024 | Nikita Kucherov | Right wing | |

=== All-Star Game replacement events ===
Tampa Bay Lightning players and coaches selected to All-Star Game replacement events
| Event | Year | Name | Position | References |
|---|---|---|---|---|
| 4 Nations Face-Off | 2025 | Anthony Cirelli (Canada) | Center | |
| 4 Nations Face-Off | 2025 | Jon Cooper (Canada) | Coach | |
| 4 Nations Face-Off | 2025 | Jake Guentzel (United States) | Left wing | |
| 4 Nations Face-Off | 2025 | Brandon Hagel (Canada) | Left wing | |
| 4 Nations Face-Off | 2025 | Victor Hedman (Sweden) | Defense | |
| 4 Nations Face-Off | 2025 | Brayden Point (Canada) | Center | |

== Career achievements ==
=== Hockey Hall of Fame ===
The following is a list of Tampa Bay Lightning who have been enshrined in the Hockey Hall of Fame.

Tampa Bay Lightning inducted into the Hockey Hall of Fame
| Individual | Category | Year inducted | Years with Lightning in category | References |
|---|---|---|---|---|
| Dave Andreychuk | Player | 2017 | 2001–2006 | |
| Dino Ciccarelli | Player | 2010 | 1996–1998 | |
| Mark Recchi | Player | 2017 | 2008–2009 | |
| Denis Savard | Player | 2000 | 1993–1995 | |
| Martin St. Louis | Player | 2018 | 2000–2014 | |

=== Foster Hewitt Memorial Award ===
One member of the Lightning organization has been honored with the Foster Hewitt Memorial Award. The award is presented by the Hockey Hall of Fame to members of the radio and television industry who make outstanding contributions to their profession and the game of ice hockey during their broadcasting career.

Members of the Tampa Bay Lightning honored with the Foster Hewitt Memorial Award
| Individual | Year honored | Years with Lightning as broadcaster | References |
|---|---|---|---|
| Rick Peckham | 2020 | 1995–2020 | |

=== United States Hockey Hall of Fame ===
Members of the Tampa Bay Lightning inducted into the United States Hockey Hall of Fame
| Individual | Year inducted | Years with franchise | References |
|---|---|---|---|
| Craig Janney | 2016 | 1998–1999 | |

=== Retired numbers ===
The Tampa Bay Lightning have retired two numbers, which means that no player can use those uniform numbers again while part of the team. The most recently retired number is that of Vincent Lecavalier, whose number was retired on February 10, 2018. Also out of circulation is the number 99 which was retired league-wide for Wayne Gretzky on February 6, 2000. Gretzky did not play for the Lightning during his 20-year NHL career and no Lightning player had ever worn the number 99 prior to its retirement.

Tampa Bay Lightning retired numbers
| Number | Player | Position | Years with Lightning as a player | Date of retirement ceremony | References |
|---|---|---|---|---|---|
| 4 | Vincent Lecavalier | Center | 1998–2013 | February 10, 2018 | |
| 26 | Martin St. Louis | Right wing | 2000–2014 | January 13, 2017 | |

== Other awards ==
Tampa Bay Lightning franchise players who have received non-NHL awards
| Award | Description | Winner | Season | References |
|---|---|---|---|---|
| Guldpucken | The ice hockey player of the year in Sweden | Victor Hedman | 2014–15, 2020–21 | (Note: Normally the Guldpucken is awarded to a player in Sweden, but Hedman won the award for his play in the NHL.) |
| Golden Hockey Stick | The ice hockey player of the year in Czech Republic | Ondrej Palat | 2021–22 | |

== See also ==
- List of National Hockey League awards
