= List of Tampa Bay Lightning records =

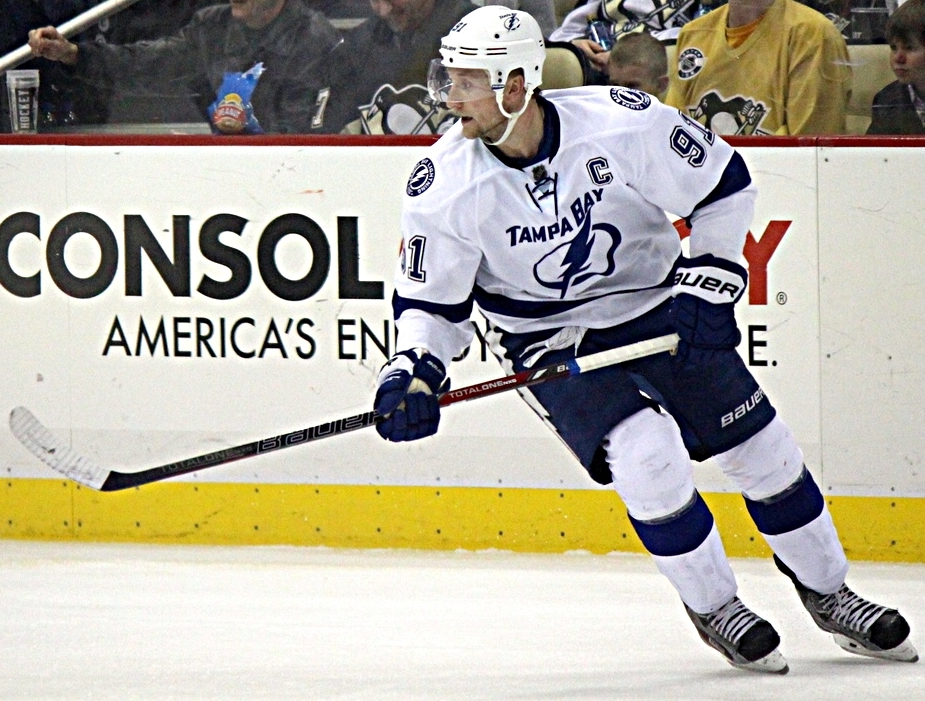
Steven Stamkos is the Lightning's career regular season leader in goals and points.

This is a list of franchise records for the Tampa Bay Lightning of the National Hockey League (updated though the 2025–26 NHL regular season).

== Career regular season leaders ==
=== Skaters ===
Games played
#	Player	GP	Seasons
1	Victor Hedman	1,164	2009–present
2	Steven Stamkos	1,082	2008–2024
3	Vincent Lecavalier	1,037	1998–2013
4	Martin St. Louis	972	2000–2014
5	Nikita Kucherov	879	2013–present
Active leader
1	Victor Hedman	1,164	2009–present

Goals
#	Player	G	Seasons
1	Steven Stamkos	555	2008–2024
2	Nikita Kucherov	401	2013–present
3	Vincent Lecavalier	383	1998–2013
4	Martin St. Louis	365	2000–2014
5	Brayden Point	324	2016–present
Active leader
2	Nikita Kucherov	401	2013–present

Assists
#	Player	A	Seasons
1	Nikita Kucherov	723	2013–present
2	Victor Hedman	639	2009–present
3	Martin St. Louis	588	2000–2014
4	Steven Stamkos	582	2008–2024
5	Vincent Lecavalier	491	1998–2013
Active leader
1	Nikita Kucherov	723	2013–present

Points
#	Player	Pts	Seasons
1	Steven Stamkos	1,137	2008–2024
2	Nikita Kucherov	1,124	2013–present
3	Martin St. Louis	953	2000–2014
4	Vincent Lecavalier	874	1998–2013
5	Victor Hedman	811	2009–present
Active leader
2	Nikita Kucherov	1,124	2013–present

Penalties in minutes
#	Player	PIM	Seasons
1	Chris Gratton	828	1993–1997, 2007–2009
2	Pavel Kubina	784	1997–2006, 2010–2012
3	Victor Hedman	782	2009–present
4	Vincent Lecavalier	746	1998–2013
5	Steven Stamkos	631	2008–2024
Active leader
3	Victor Hedman	782	2009–present

=== Goaltenders ===
Games played
#	Player	GP	Seasons
1	Andrei Vasilevskiy	598	2014–present
2	Ben Bishop	227	2013–2017
3	Daren Puppa	206	1993–2000
4	Nikolai Khabibulin	192	2000–2004
5	Mike Smith	118	2007–2011
Active leader
1	Andrei Vasilevskiy	598	2014–present

Wins
#	Player	W	Seasons
1	Andrei Vasilevskiy	370	2014–present
2	Ben Bishop	131	2013–2017
3	Nikolai Khabibulin	83	2000–2004
4	Daren Puppa	77	1993–2000
5	John Grahame	53	2002–2006
Active leader
1	Andrei Vasilevskiy	370	2014–present

Shutouts
#	Player	SO	Seasons
1	Andrei Vasilevskiy	42	2014–present
2	Ben Bishop	17	2013–2017
3	Nikolai Khabibulin	14	2000–2004
4	Daren Puppa	12	1993–2000
5	John Grahame	8	2002–2006
Active leader
1	Andrei Vasilevskiy	42	2014–present

== Single season records ==
=== Skaters ===
Goals
#	Player	G	Season
1	Steven Stamkos	60	2011–12
2	Vincent Lecavalier	52	2006–07
3	Brayden Point	51	2022–23
3	Steven Stamkos	51	2009–10
5	Brayden Point	46	2023–24

Assists
#	Player	A	Season
1	Nikita Kucherov	100	2023–24
2	Nikita Kucherov	87	2018–19
3	Nikita Kucherov	86	2025–26
4	Nikita Kucherov	84	2024–25
5	Nikita Kucherov	83	2022–23

Points
#	Player	Pts	Season
1	Nikita Kucherov	144	2023–24
2	Nikita Kucherov	130	2025–26
3	Nikita Kucherov	128	2018–19
4	Nikita Kucherov	121	2022–23
5	Nikita Kucherov	113	2022–23

Penalties in minutes
#	Player	PIM	Season
1	Zenon Konopka	265	2009–10
2	Enrico Ciccone	258	1995–96
3	Enrico Ciccone	225	1994–95
4	Steve Downie	208	2009–10
5	Chris Gratton	201	1996–97

=== Goaltenders ===
Games played
#	Player	GP	Season
1	Nikolai Khabibulin	70	2001–02
2	Nikolai Khabibulin	65	2002–03
2	Andrei Vasilevskiy	65	2017–18
4	Ben Bishop	63	2013–14
4	Daren Puppa	63	1993–94
4	Andrei Vasilevskiy	63	2021–22; 2024–25

Wins
#	Player	W	Season
1	Andrei Vasilevskiy	44	2017–18
2	Ben Bishop	40	2014–15
3	Andrei Vasilevskiy	39	2018–19; 2021–22; 2025–26

Shutouts
#	Player	SO	Season
1	Andrei Vasilevskiy	8	2017–18
2	Nikolai Khabibulin	7	2001–02
3	Ben Bishop	6	2015–16
3	Andrei Vasilevskiy	6	2018–19; 2024–25

== Career playoff leaders ==
=== Skaters ===
Games played
#	Player	GP	Seasons
1	Victor Hedman	170	2011–present
2	Nikita Kucherov	152	2014–present
3	Alex Killorn	140	2014–2023
4	Ondrej Palat	138	2014–2022
5	Steven Stamkos	128	2011–2024
Active leader
1	Victor Hedman	170	2011–present

Goals
#	Player	G	Seasons
1	Nikita Kucherov	53	2014–present
2	Steven Stamkos	50	2011–2024
3	Ondrej Palat	48	2014–2022
4	Brayden Point	44	2018–present
5	Alex Killorn	37	2014–2023
Active leader
1	Nikita Kucherov	53	2014–present

Assists
#	Player	A	Seasons
1	Nikita Kucherov	118	2014–present
2	Victor Hedman	97	2011–present
3	Steven Stamkos	51	2011–2024
4	Ondrej Palat	46	2014–2022
5	Brayden Point	45	2018–present
Active leader
1	Nikita Kucherov	118	2014–present

Points
#	Player	Pts	Seasons
1	Nikita Kucherov	171	2014–present
2	Victor Hedman	120	2011–present
3	Steven Stamkos	101	2011–2024
4	Ondrej Palat	94	2014–2022
5	Brayden Point	89	2018–present
Active leader
1	Nikita Kucherov	171	2014–present

Penalties in minutes
#	Player	PIM	Seasons
1	Alex Killorn	121	2014–2023
1	Cedric Paquette	121	2014–2020
3	Pat Maroon	117	2020–2023
4	Nikita Kucherov	116	2014–present
5	Pavel Kubina	98	2002–2011
Active leader
4	Nikita Kucherov	116	2014–present

=== Goaltenders ===
Games played
#	Player	GP	Seasons
1	Andrei Vasilevskiy	120	2015–present
2	Ben Bishop	36	2015–2016
3	Nikolai Khabibulin	33	2003–2004
4	Dwayne Roloson	17	2011
5	John Grahame	6	2003–2006
5	Johan Holmqvist	6	2007
Active leader
1	Andrei Vasilevskiy	120	2015–present

Wins
#	Player	W	Seasons
1	Andrei Vasilevskiy	67	2015–present
2	Ben Bishop	21	2015–2016
2	Nikolai Khabibulin	21	2003–2004
4	Dwayne Roloson	10	2011
5	Johan Holmqvist	2	2007
Active leader
1	Andrei Vasilevskiy	67	2015–present

Shutouts
#	Player	SO	Seasons
1	Andrei Vasilevskiy	7	2015–present
2	Ben Bishop	5	2015–2016
2	Nikolai Khabibulin	5	2003–2004
4	Dwayne Roloson	1	2011
Active leader
1	Andrei Vasilevskiy	7	2015–present

== See also ==
- List of Tampa Bay Lightning players
- List of Tampa Bay Lightning seasons
