= Victor Hedman =

Swedish ice hockey player (born 1990)

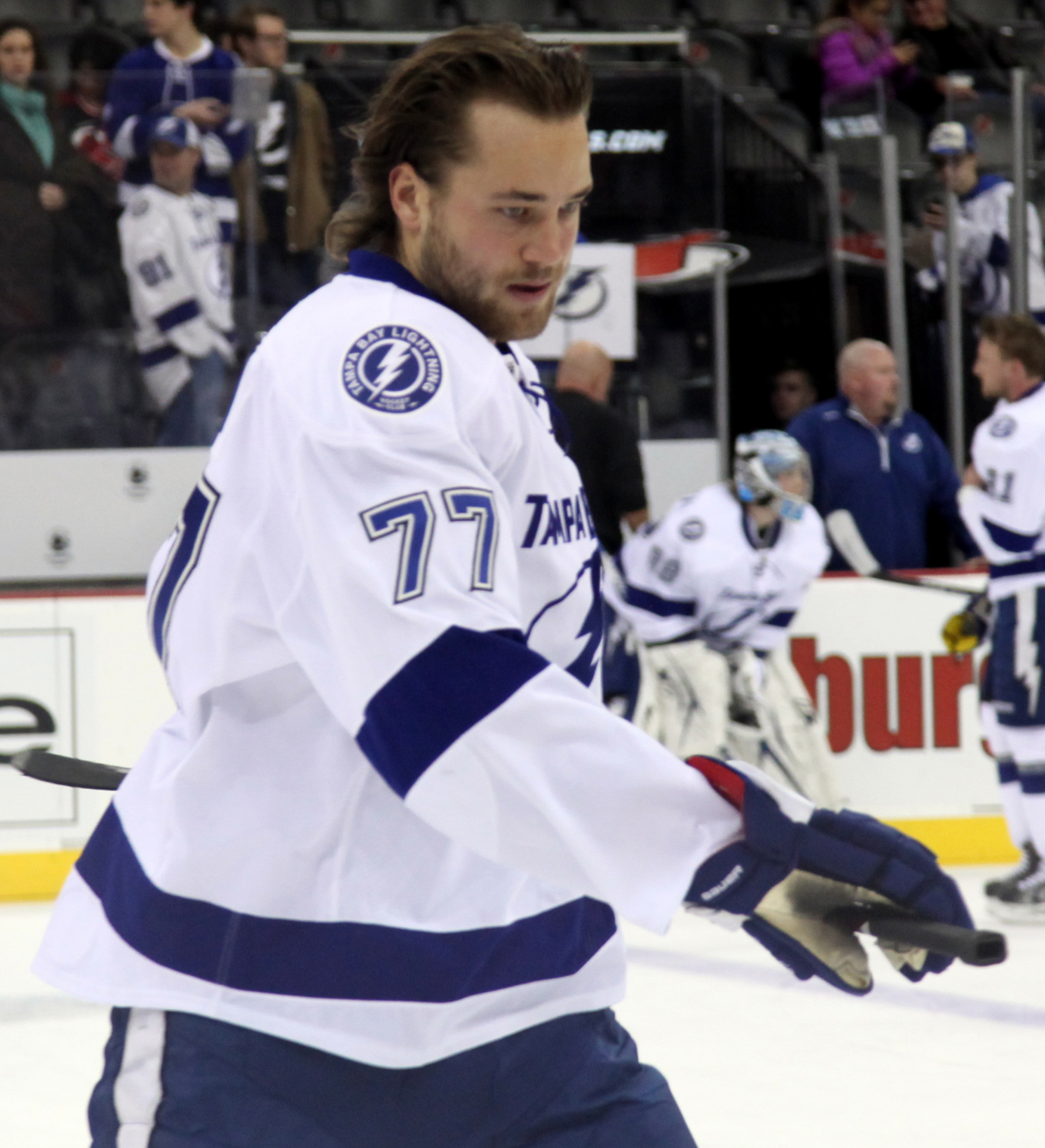
- Hedman with the Tampa Bay Lightning in December 2014
- Born: 18 December 1990 (age 35) Örnsköldsvik, Sweden
- Height: 6 ft 7 in (201 cm)
- Weight: 244 lb (111 kg; 17 st 6 lb)
- Position: Defence
- Shoots: Left
- NHL team Former teams: Tampa Bay Lightning; Modo Hockey; Barys Astana
- National team: Sweden
- NHL draft: 2nd overall, 2009; Tampa Bay Lightning
- Playing career: 2007–present

Victor Erik Olof Hedman (Swedish: [ˈvɪ̌kːtɔr ˈhěːdman]; born 18 December 1990) is a Swedish professional ice hockey player who is a defenceman and captain for the Tampa Bay Lightning of the National Hockey League (NHL). Hedman was selected second overall by the Lightning in the 2009 NHL entry draft and made his NHL debut that year.

Widely considered to be one of the best defencemen of his generation, Hedman is a six-time James Norris Memorial Trophy finalist, winning the award in 2018. Hedman won the Stanley Cup back-to-back with the Lightning in 2020 and 2021, and won the Conn Smythe Trophy as the most valuable player in 2020.

== Playing career ==
=== Modo Hockey ===
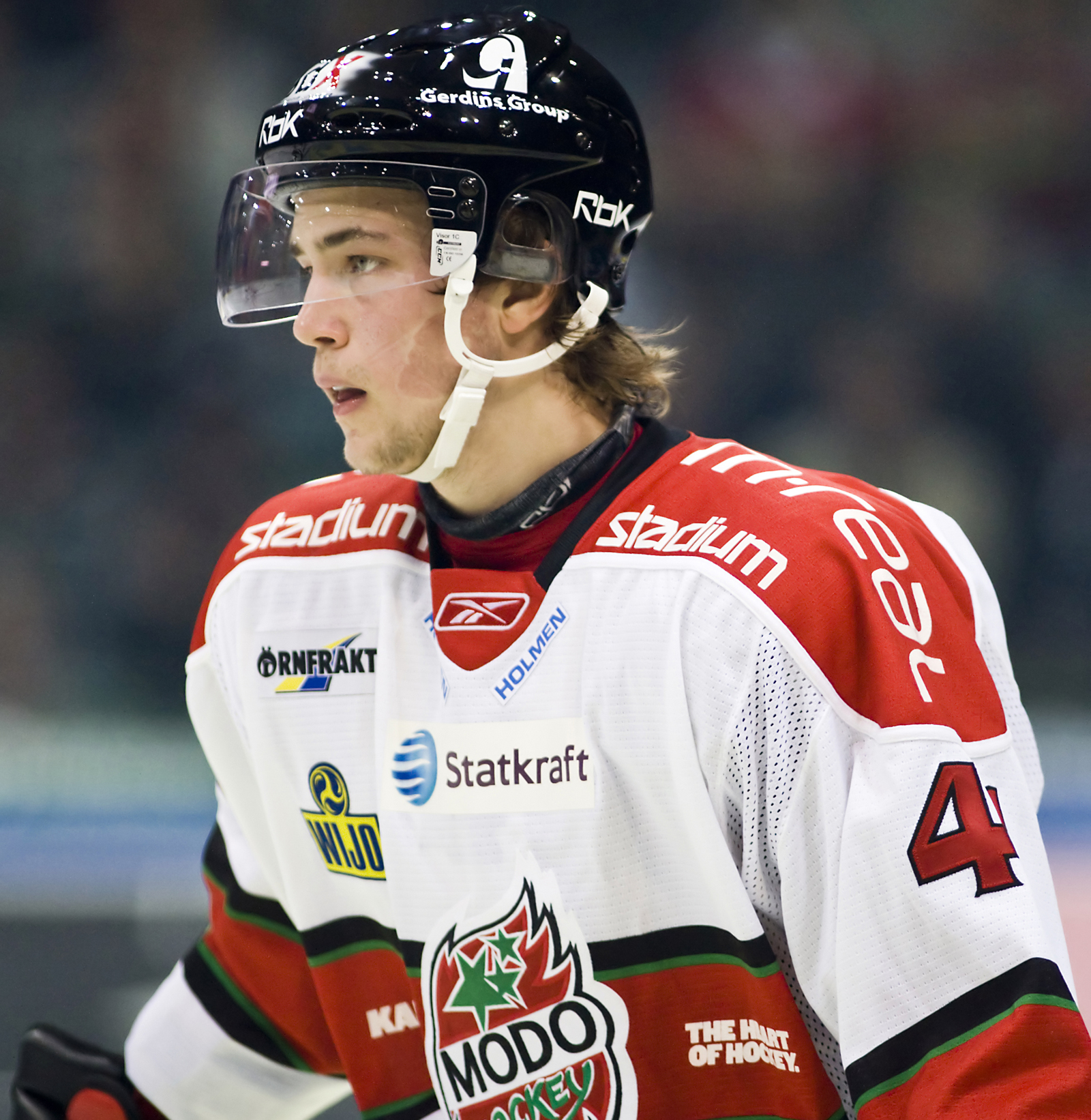
Hedman with Modo Hockey in September 2008

Hedman began his junior ice hockey career in the Swedish J20 SuperElit with the Modo Hockey organization. He recorded 25 points in 34 games during his first full season in the league in 2006–07. Hedman then turned professional and joined the Elitserien with Modo at age 16. At the beginning of the 2008–09 season, he was ranked first overall amongst all draft-eligible skaters in the International Scouting Services' preliminary rankings. In the same season, he was nominated as the SHL Rookie of the Year. Following his performance at the 2009 World Junior Championships for Sweden, Hedman was listed atop the rankings of European skaters by the NHL Central Scouting Bureau. Despite the unlikelihood of Hedman playing in Russia, he was drafted 83rd overall by the Kontinental Hockey League (KHL)'s Spartak Moscow on 1 June 2009.

Going into the 2009 NHL entry draft, Hedman was listed as the second-ranked player and top European player. He was drafted second overall by the Tampa Bay Lightning, behind John Tavares, who was drafted first overall by the New York Islanders.

Hedman has drawn comparisons to Hart Trophy-winning defenceman Chris Pronger, who is also 6' 6" and 220 pounds, as well as also being drafted second overall.

=== Tampa Bay Lightning (2009–present) ===
==== Early years in Tampa (2009–2013) ====
Hedman made his NHL debut for the Lightning on 3 October 2009, against the Atlanta Thrashers. He registered his first point, an assist, on a Martin St. Louis goal. On 5 November, Hedman suffered a concussion in a 3–2 overtime win over the Ottawa Senators after being on the receiving end of a hit from Senators' defenceman and enforcer Chris Neil, resulting in him missing the following game two days later against the Montreal Canadiens before returning for the game five days after against Los Angeles Kings. His first NHL goal was then scored on 5 December against Dwayne Roloson of the New York Islanders. The 2009–10 season, his rookie season, ended with Hedman playing 74 games with four goals, 16 assists and 20 points.

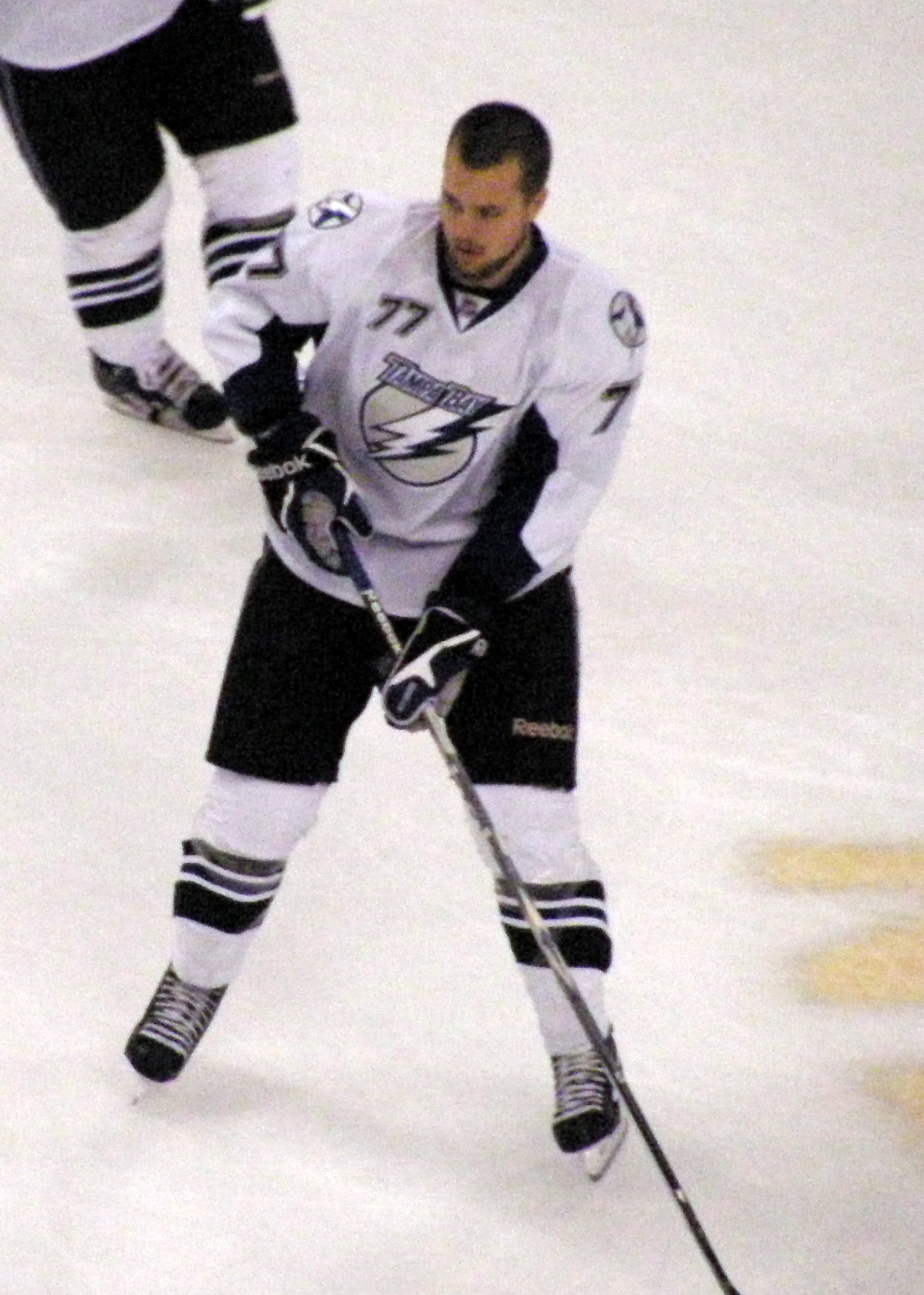
Hedman with the Lightning in May 2011

On 5 January 2011, halfway into his sophomore NHL season in 2010–11, Hedman checked Pittsburgh Penguins centre and captain Sidney Crosby from behind, receiving a minor boarding penalty. The hit was one of two that were eventually blamed for causing a severe concussion on Crosby that kept him out of play for the rest of the season and most of the 2011–12 season. After ending the 2010–11 season with three goals, 23 assists and 26 points in 79 games and helped the Lightning clinch a playoff spot for the first time since 2007, Hedman made his Stanley Cup playoff debut on 13 April 2011 against the Pittsburgh Penguins. On 15 April in game two, Hedman recorded his first career playoff assist and point on a goal by Eric Brewer. Hedman and the Lightning would make a surprisingly deep playoff run throughout the 2011 playoffs as they would eventually defeat the fourth-seeded Penguins in seven games (after initially trailing 3–1 in earlier in the series) and then sweep the top-seeded Washington Capitals in four games in the second round before getting defeated by the third-seeded and eventual Stanley Cup champion Boston Bruins in the Eastern Conference Final in seven games, one win short from reaching the Stanley Cup Final.

On 29 November 2011, shortly into the 2011–12 season, Hedman signed a five-year, $20 million contract extension with Tampa Bay. On 27 December, Hedman suffered a concussion in a 5–1 victory against the Philadelphia Flyers, resulting in him missing the next 13 games. Hedman ultimately ended the season with five goals and 18 assists for 23 points in 61 games.

On 25 September 2012, it was announced that Hedman signed a contract with Barys Astana of the KHL during the 2012–13 NHL lockout. In January 2013, Hedman returned to the NHL after lockout ended, playing 44 games of the shortened 48-game season and registering four goals, 16 assists and 20 points.

==== Rising star amongst defenceman, Norris Trophy win (2013–2019) ====
During the 2013–14 season, Hedman had a breakout season, posting a career best in goals (13), assists (42) and points (55) in 75 contests played as the Lightning as a team finished third in the East, qualifying for the playoffs for the first time since 2011. His 42 assists led the team in that statistic. In game four in the opening round of the 2014 playoffs on 22 April 2014, Hedman scored his first career playoff goal on Montreal Canadiens goaltender Carey Price. The sixth-seeded Canadiens would eventually win the game 4–3 against the Lightning to complete the four game sweep.

Hedman picked up right where he left off to start the 2014–15 season. However, his strong start would be derailed after he suffered a broken finger in a game against the Vancouver Canucks on 18 October 2014 by blocking a shot from Canucks forward Jannik Hansen, which was expected to rule him out of play for four-to-six weeks. At the time of this injury, Hedman was tied for the lead amongst NHL defencemen with seven points (three goals and four assists) and was considered a possible James Norris Memorial Trophy candidate for Defenceman of the Year entering into the season. Despite this injury, Hedman still had a productive season with the Lightning after recovering, scoring 10 goals and 28 assists for 38 points in 59 games played. After game two of the Stanley Cup Final against the Chicago Blackhawks on 6 June 2015, Hedman had recorded two points with two assists on goals by Cédric Paquette and Jason Garrison to secure the spot as the point leader by a Lightning defencemen in a single playoff year, with 1 goal, 11 assists and 12 points up that point in the 2015 playoffs. On 8 June, during game three of the Final, Hedman recorded assists on goals by Ryan Callahan and Cédric Paquette to set the Lightning franchise record for most career playoff assists (20) and points (23) by a defenceman, surpassing Dan Boyle, who previously held the record with three goals and 19 assists (22 points). The Lightning would eventually lose the series to the Blackhawks in six games and Hedman finished the playoffs with a goal and 13 assists for 14 points in all 26 games.

On 15 October 2015, in a 5–3 loss to the Dallas Stars, Hedman suffered a concussion after being on the receiving end of a hit by Stars' forward and captain Jamie Benn, causing him to miss the next game two days later against the Buffalo Sabres and returning to the lineup in the game after, three days later against the Nashville Predators. He eventually finished the 2015–16 season with 10 goals and a team-leading 37 assists for 47 points in 78 games played. On 20 May 2016, Hedman recorded two assists in a 4–3 Lightning win over the Pittsburgh Penguins in game four of the Eastern Conference Final in the 2016 playoffs on goals by Ryan Callahan and Jonathan Drouin, respectively. The two assists moved Hedman past Vincent Lecavalier (28) and Brad Richards (29) for number two all-time in playoff assists with the franchise. In game six on 24 May, Hedman played his 64th career playoff game to become the leader in playoff games played for the Lightning. He surpassed former teammates Martin St. Louis and Vincent Lecavalier, who were tied for the most playoff games played in franchise history beforehand. The Lightning would eventually fall in seven games to the Penguins in the third round of the playoffs by losing game seven 2–1 for a 4–3 defeat in the series, one win short from a second consecutive appearance in the Stanley Cup Final.

On 1 July 2016, the Lightning re-signed Hedman to an eight-year contract extension worth $7.875 million per season. In the previous season, Hedman led all Lightning defencemen in goals (10), assists (37), points (47) and plus-minus. He also led all Lightning skaters in assists, plus-minus, average ice time (23:03), takeaways (48) and blocked shots (132). He also posted a career-high with a plus-21 rating. Hedman currently ranks third all-time in franchise history among defencemen in career points (229), behind Dan Boyle (253) and Pavel Kubina (243). He is also second all-time among defencemen in assists (180) and fourth for goals (49). Hedman ranks third all-time among Lightning defencemen for games played, trailing only Pavel Kubina (662) and Cory Sarich (490). In addition, Hedman is the Bolts' all-time playoff leader for points, goals, assists and plus-minus among defencemen. On 26 October, Hedman recorded his 50th career NHL goal. The goal came in a 7–3 Lightning victory over the Toronto Maple Leafs at the Air Canada Centre. On 5 November, Hedman recorded his 187th assist on a Brian Boyle goal, which tied him with Dan Boyle for most career assists by a Lightning defenceman. The assist came in a 4–1 Lightning victory over the visiting New Jersey Devils. On 10 November, Hedman recorded his 188th career assist on a goal by Nikita Kucherov against the New York Islanders which is the most assists by a defenceman in Lightning history. Hedman is now seventh in franchise history in assists. On 14 November, Hedman recorded his 189th assist, which tied with Brian Bradley for sixth in assists in Lightning history. The assist came on a Ryan Callahan goal in a 4–0 Lightning win over the New York Islanders at the Barclays Center. On 15 November, Hedman recorded his 190th assist on a Steven Stamkos goal, which moved Hedman past Bradley for sixth all time in assists in Lightning history. The assist came in a 4–3 win over the Detroit Red Wings at Joe Louis Arena. On 21 November against the Nashville Predators, Hedman recorded an assist on a Tyler Johnson goal, which was Hedman's 243rd career point. This put Hedman into a tie with Pavel Kubina for tenth place on the Lightning's all-time scoring list. Hedman also tied with Kubina for second all-time in points by a defencemen in Lightning history. On 23 November, Hedman recorded a goal in a 4–2 Lightning victory over the visiting Philadelphia Flyers. This was Hedman's 244th career point, which moved him past Kubina for second in points by a defenceman and tenth in points in Lightning history. On 14 December, Hedman skated in his 500th career NHL game, which came in a 6–3 Lightning victory over the Calgary Flames. Additionally, Hedman recorded three assists on goals by Alex Killorn, Andrej Šustr and Brian Boyle respectively and thereafter needed two points to tie Dan Boyle (253) for most all-time points by a Lightning defenceman. On 16 December, Hedman recorded his 253rd career NHL point in a 4–2 loss to the Vancouver Canucks with a goal on Canucks' goaltender Ryan Miller, which moved him into a tie with Dan Boyle. On 17 December, Hedman became the all-time leader in points by a defenceman with his 254th career point, an assist on a goal by Jonathan Drouin in a 3–2 win over the Edmonton Oilers. As a result of this milestone, Hedman also moved into ninth place on the all-time franchise list for all skaters. On 20 December, Hedman recorded his 200th career NHL assist on a goal scored by Brayden Point. Hedman also became the first defencemen in Lightning history to record 200 career assists. On 28 December against the Montreal Canadiens, Hedman recorded two points, a goal on Canadiens goaltender Carey Price and an assist on a goal by Ondřej Palát to move past Chris Gratton in to eighth place on the Lightning's all-time scoring list. On 10 January 2017, Hedman was named to the 2017 NHL All-Star Game as a member of the Atlantic Division team. On 23 February, Hedman recorded his 526th and 527th career hits in a game against the Calgary Flames, which moved him past Eric Brewer for the most hits in Lightning history. On 11 March, Hedman recorded his 287th career point in a Lightning uniform with an assist on a Nikita Kucherov goal in a 3–2 Lightning win over the Florida Panthers. This moved him past Fredrik Modin for seventh-most points all-time in franchise history. On 27 March, in a 5–4 overtime win over the Chicago Blackhawks, Hedman recorded his 50th assist of the season to become the first defenceman in Lightning history to record 50th assists in a single season. On 30 March, Hedman recorded an assist on a goal by Jonathan Drouin in the second period to move him past Roman Hamrlík for the most points (66) in a single season by a defenceman in Lightning history as the Lightning would defeat the Detroit Red Wings 5–3. On 6 April, in a 4–1 win over the Toronto Maple Leafs, Hedman recorded three assists on goals by Nikita Kucherov, Brayden Point and Michaël Bournival to become the first defenceman in Lightning history to reach 70 points in a single season. Hedman also joined Börje Salming, Nicklas Lidström and Erik Karlsson as the only Swedish defencemen to reach 70 points in a single season. On 9 April in the 2016–17 season finale, Hedman recorded a goal and an assist on a Brayden Point goal in a 4–2 Lightning win over the visiting Buffalo Sabres. Hedman's two points moved him past Brian Bradley for sixth all-time in franchise history in points (301). Hedman completed the season with a career-high in goals, assists and points with 16 goals, 56 assists and 72 points recorded in 79 games played. His 56 assists led the Lightning in assists. Hedman and the Lightning would miss the 2017 playoffs by just one point in the standings. On 21 April, Hedman was named as a finalist for the James Norris Memorial Trophy for the first time in his career, which is awarded annually to the NHL's top defenceman. Hedman finished third in Norris voting that season as the award ultimately went to Brent Burns of the San Jose Sharks. On 21 June, Hedman was named as an NHL Second Team All Star for the 2016–17 season.

On 12 October 2017, Hedman skated in his 553rd NHL game against the Pittsburgh Penguins, which moved him past Brad Richards for fifth-most games played in Lightning history. On the same night, Hedman recorded his 66th career NHL goal, which moved him into a tie with Dan Boyle for second-most goals by a Lightning defencemen in franchise history. On 4 November, Hedman recorded two assists on goals by Steven Stamkos and Yanni Gourde in a 5–4 Lightning win over the visiting Columbus Blue Jackets. The two assists moved Hedman past Václav Prospal (245) for fifth-most assists in Lightning franchise history. On 10 January 2018, Hedman was named to the 2018 NHL All-Star Game. Hedman also became the only defenceman in Lightning history to be named to multiple All-Star Games. However, he could not play due to injury and he was replaced by teammate Brayden Point. Hedman was unable to play in the All-Star Game due to a knee injury suffered on 11 January in a game against the Calgary Flames in a knee-on-knee collision with Flames' forward Garnet Hathaway. However, Hedman did participate in the event by serving an assistant equipment manager. On 8 February, Hedman recorded a goal in a 5–2 win over the visiting Vancouver Canucks. The goal moved Hedman past Pavel Kubina for the most goals by a defenceman in franchise history. On 3 March, Hedman recorded a four-point game in a 7–6 Lightning shootout win over the visiting Philadelphia Flyers. With his four-point effort, Hedman became the only defenceman in Lightning history to record multiple 4+ point games. Hedman finished the 2017–18 season with 17 goals and 46 assists for 63 points in 77 games played and a career high +32 rating to help the Lightning not only return to the playoffs after the team narrowly missed the year prior but also helping the Lightning finish the season as the top seed in the Eastern Conference. In the 2018 playoffs, Hedman and the Lightning would go on another lengthy playoff run having defeated the eighth-seeded New Jersey Devils in five games and the third-seeded Boston Bruins in five games in the first two rounds before being defeated in the Eastern Conference Final in seven games by the second-seeded and eventual Stanley Cup Champion Washington Capitals, one win short of reaching the Stanley Cup Final once more. Hedman ended the playoffs with 1 goal and 10 assists for 11 points in all 17 games played. On 20 June, at the 2018 NHL awards, Hedman won the James Norris Memorial Trophy for the first time in his career. This was Hedman's second consecutive nomination and second time for his career for the award. Hedman was the first defenceman in Lightning history to win the award.

Shortly before the 2018–19 season began, Hedman was named alternate captain for the Lightning. On 29 December 2018, Hedman recorded his 300th career NHL assist on a Nikita Kucherov goal against the Montreal Canadiens. On 10 January 2019, Hedman skated in his 663rd game in a Lightning uniform in a 3–1 win over the Carolina Hurricanes. This moved Hedman past Pavel Kubina for the most games played by a defenceman in franchise history. On 10 February, Hedman recorded his 400th career NHL point with an assist on a goal scored by Yanni Gourde in a 5–4 Lightning victory over the Pittsburgh Penguins. On 5 March, Hedman moved past Dan Boyle for most power play points by a defenceman in Lightning history (127) with an assist on a goal by Brayden Point in a 5–2 win over the Winnipeg Jets. Hedman finished the season playing in 70 games with 12 goals, 42 assists and 54 points. The Lighting won their first Presidents' Trophy as the regular season champions, tying the 1995–96 Detroit Red Wings for a league record of 62 wins in an 82-game season. Despite the regular season dominance, the Lightning would surprisingly get swept in the first round of the 2019 playoffs by the eighth-seeded Columbus Blue Jackets. In the four game sweep, Hedman would be held pointless in the first two games of the series before missing the final two games due to an undisclosed injury in game two. Hedman was a finalist for the Norris Trophy for the third consecutive season, which eventually went to Calgary Flames captain Mark Giordano.

==== Continued success, back-to-back Stanley Cups, Conn Smythe Trophy (2019–2024) ====
On 5 December 2019, Hedman scored his 100th career NHL goal in a 5–4 loss against the Minnesota Wild against goaltender Alex Stalock. Hedman became the first defenceman in Lightning history to record 100 regular season goals and the seventh Swedish-born defenceman to do so. On 30 December, Hedman was announced as a selection for the 2020 NHL All-Star Game. Hedman was named a finalist for the James Norris Memorial Trophy for the fourth consecutive season, which eventually went to Nashville Predators captain Roman Josi. On 23 August 2020, Hedman scored two goals in a 3–2 loss against the Presidents' Trophy-winning Boston Bruins on goaltender Jaroslav Halák in the first game of the second round of the 2020 playoffs. The goals moved Hedman past Vincent Lecavalier for fifth-most points (53) in Lightning playoff history. On 25 August, Hedman recorded an assist on a goal by Blake Coleman in a game two overtime victory over the Bruins. The assist moved him past Steven Stamkos for fourth-most playoff points (54) in Lightning history. The assist also moved Hedman past Erik Karlsson and Calle Johansson for fourth-most playoff assists (44) among Swedish defencemen. On 31 August, Hedman scored the game-winning goal and series clinching double-overtime goal over the Bruins. The goal was his fourth of the series and fifth of the playoffs. The four goals set a franchise record for most goals by a defenceman in a single playoff series. The fifth goal extended his current Lightning record of most goals by a defencemen in a single playoff year. As the Lightning defeated the Dallas Stars in six games in the 2020 Stanley Cup Final for their second Stanley Cup in franchise history, Hedman was awarded the Conn Smythe Trophy by NHL commissioner Gary Bettman as the most valuable player in the playoffs. His ten goals during the 2020 playoffs were the third-most by a defenceman during a playoff year in league history, behind only Paul Coffey (12 in 1985 and Brian Leetch (11 in 1994).

On 16 March 2021, Hedman recorded his 500th point in a 4–3 overtime win against the Dallas Stars with an assist on a goal scored by captain Steven Stamkos. On 17 April, Hedman recorded his 400th NHL assist on a goal scored by Erik Černák in a 5–3 loss to the Florida Panthers, becoming the first defenceman in franchise history to reach that mark. Hedman recorded nine goals and 36 assists for 46 points and played in 55 games of the 2020–21 season, which was shortened to 56 games due to the ongoing COVID-19 pandemic. Hedman was a Norris Trophy finalist for the fifth-straight season although the award ultimately went to Adam Fox of the New York Rangers. Hedman and the Lightning repeated at Stanley Cup champions in 2021 by defeating the Montreal Canadiens in five games in the 2021 Stanley Cup Final after defeating the Florida Panthers in six games, Carolina Hurricanes in five games and New York Islanders in seven games in the first three rounds, respectively. After the Lightning's championship, it was revealed that Hedman played the last several weeks of the season and the entire playoffs with a torn meniscus that was initially sustained on 30 March in a 3–1 loss to the Columbus Blue Jackets.

On 9 May 2022, Hedman was named a Norris Trophy finalist for the sixth consecutive season and sixth time in his career altogether after finishing the 2021–22 season with career highs in goals (20), assists (65) and points (85) along with a team-high +26 rating. His 65 assists was the most on the team. He played in all 82 games for the first time in his career. The Norris Trophy would eventually go to Cale Makar of the Colorado Avalanche. After defeating the Toronto Maple Leafs, Presidents' Trophy-winning Florida Panthers and New York Rangers in the first three rounds of the 2022 playoffs, Hedman and the Lightning would clinch a third consecutive appearance in the Stanley Cup Final (fourth altogether for Hedman's tenure and career) in which the Lightning would fall in six games to the top-seeded Colorado Avalanche.

On 11 February 2023, Hedman recorded his 500th assist on a goal by Anthony Cirelli in a 3–1 victory over the Dallas Stars to become the 33rd defenceman in NHL history to hit the mark. Hedman finished the 2022–23 season with nine goals, 40 assists and 49 points in 76 contests played. In the 2023 playoffs, Hedman and the Lightning would face the Toronto Maple Leafs in the first round for the second straight year, where this time they would lose in six games. In the series, Hedman was held goalless and recorded three assists and points in five contexts played.

Hedman played his 1,000th NHL game in a 4–0 Lightning win against the Dallas Stars on 4 December 2023. Hedman would finish the 2023–24 season playing in 78 games with 13 goals, 63 assists and 76 points followed by a goal and six assists for seven points in all five games of the 2024 playoffs in the Lightning's first round exit in five games to the eventual Stanley Cup champion Florida Panthers.

==== Recent years and captaincy (2024–present) ====
On 2 July 2024, Hedman signed a four-year, $32 million contract extension with the Lightning, taking him until the 2028–29 season with $8 million per year. On 18 September, the Lightning named Hedman as captain, becoming the 11th captain in team history after the previous captain, Steven Stamkos, signed with the Nashville Predators in free agency earlier in the 2024 off-season. On 30 November, Hedman recorded two assists on goals by Brandon Hagel and Cam Atkinson in a 5–3 loss against the Toronto Maple Leafs to reach 590 career NHL assists, passing Martin St. Louis for franchise leader in assists. On 28 December, Hedman played in his 1,083rd game in a 6–2 win over the New York Rangers, passing Steven Stamkos for most games played in Lightning history. On 16 January 2025, Hedman recorded his 600th career assist on a goal by Anthony Cirelli in a 4–3 SO win over the Anaheim Ducks, becoming the first player in Lightning history to reach the mark. Hedman finished the 2024–25 season with 15 goals and 51 assists for 66 points in 79 games played. He also added three assists for three points but was goalless in all five playoff games in the 2025 playoffs as the Lightning were defeated in the first round for the third consecutive year and second consecutive year to the Florida Panthers. It was revealed that Hedman played game five through a broken foot initially suffered in game four.

The 2025–26 season proved to be a challenging one for Hedman. On 8 November 2025, in a 3–2 win over the Washington Capitals, Hedman sustained an undisclosed injury, causing him to miss the next 12 games. After returning for three games, Hedman then would suffer an elbow injury in a 6–1 win over the Montreal Canadiens on 9 December. The injury would require surgery and for Hedman to miss the next 22 games. After playing 15 more games, it was announced that Hedman would be taking a leave of absence for personal reasons, which was later revealed to focus on mental health. Hedman would not play the remainder of the season or the playoffs. He ended the season playing in 33 games with 17 points (a goal and 16 assists) without playing in any playoff games as the Lightning were eliminated in the first round once more, this time in seven games by the Montreal Canadiens.

== International play ==
Medal record

Representing Sweden

Ice hockey

World Championships
Gold medal – first place	2017 Germany/France	
Bronze medal – third place	2010 Germany	
Bronze medal – third place	2024 Czechia	

World Junior Championships
Silver medal – second place	2009 Ottawa	
Silver medal – second place	2008 Pardubice	

World U18 Championships
Bronze medal – third place	2007 Tampere	

Hedman played for Sweden at the 2008 World Junior Championships, where he helped the team to a silver medal, losing to Canada 3–2 in the final, and was selected to the tournament All-Star Team. He later became one of the youngest players to play for Sweden's men's team when he made his debut at age 17 in an exhibition game against Norway. Hedman would once again play for Sweden's junior team at the 2009 World Junior Championships in Ottawa, where he met Canada for the second consecutive year in the gold-medal game, earning another silver medal in a 5–1 loss.

On 2 March 2016, the Swedish Ice Hockey Association named Hedman to its roster for the 2016 World Cup of Hockey. Hedman was joined by Lightning teammate Anton Strålman. The tournament ran from 17 September to 1 October 2016 in Toronto.

On 15 April 2017, the Swedish Ice Hockey Association named Hedman to its roster for the 2017 IIHF World Championship. On 28 April, Hedman was named as an assistant captain for the tournament. On 21 May, Hedman helped team Sweden capture gold in a 2–1 victory over Canada.

== Personal life ==
Hedman has two older brothers – Oscar Hedman, who was also a professional hockey player who played for Modo Hockey; as well as Johan Hedman, who does not play professionally.

As a child, Hedman originally started out playing as a goaltender. He also played hockey on the streets together with his friends, among them, famous iRacing driver Fredrik Sellgren. His father, Olle Hedman, told his son that if he left the net, he would purchase him the new helmet that he coveted. He has not played in goal since that day. Victor said, "I'm thankful for that now. You never know what would have happened otherwise."

Hedman's other passions were flying (he has logged eight hours on a Piper PA-32) and football. His father said that his son would just outrun everyone on the field. Hedman still plays soccer in the summer and religiously follows the sport. He supports Premier League side Manchester United. In an article, it was revealed that when quizzed on any player on any Premier League team, he could not be stumped. His dad said that his son "probably knows more about football than hockey". However, "Hedman knew that hockey would be his future, encouraged by some of the game's greats. They'd come back every summer to play for a team called the Icebreakers, inviting Hedman to play." Some notable players on the team included Peter Forsberg, Markus Näslund, Henrik Zetterberg and Nicklas Bäckström. Hedman said that "looking back at it now, it was an unbelievable experience".

In 2014, Hedman started a hockey school in his hometown. The spots in the school sold out in two hours. Hedman said that "to see the thrill in the kids' eyes, it's worth it all".

Hedman is from Örnsköldsvik and trains with Daniel and Henrik Sedin in the off-season.

In a 2016 interview with The Hockey News, Hedman revealed that he wears jersey number 77 as a homage to Ray Bourque, whom he idolized as a child. In his childhood, Hedman would regularly watch the Colorado Avalanche, whom Hedman was drawn to because of Swedish hockey legend Peter Forsberg. Hedman had originally worn the jersey number 41 in Sweden, but when he was drafted by the Lightning, that number was already worn by Mike Smith.

== Career statistics ==
=== Regular season and playoffs ===
			Regular season					Playoffs
Season	Team	League	GP	G	A	Pts	PIM	GP	G	A	Pts	PIM
2005–06	Modo Hockey	J20	10	3	17	20	8	—	—	—	—	—
2006–07	Modo Hockey	J20	34	13	12	25	30	5	1	1	2	44
2007–08	Modo Hockey	J20	6	2	1	3	26	3	2	0	2	4
2007–08	Modo Hockey	SEL	39	2	2	4	44	5	1	0	1	4
2008–09	Modo Hockey	J20	2	0	2	2	10	5	0	1	1	2
2008–09	Modo Hockey	SEL	43	8	14	22	52	—	—	—	—	—
2009–10	Tampa Bay Lightning	NHL	74	4	16	20	79	—	—	—	—	—
2010–11	Tampa Bay Lightning	NHL	79	3	23	26	70	18	0	6	6	8
2011–12	Tampa Bay Lightning	NHL	61	5	18	23	65	—	—	—	—	—
2012–13	Barys Astana	KHL	26	1	20	21	70	—	—	—	—	—
2012–13	Tampa Bay Lightning	NHL	44	4	16	20	31	—	—	—	—	—
2013–14	Tampa Bay Lightning	NHL	75	13	42	55	53	4	1	2	3	2
2014–15	Tampa Bay Lightning	NHL	59	10	28	38	40	26	1	13	14	6
2015–16	Tampa Bay Lightning	NHL	78	10	37	47	46	17	4	10	14	14
2016–17	Tampa Bay Lightning	NHL	79	16	56	72	47	—	—	—	—	—
2017–18	Tampa Bay Lightning	NHL	77	17	46	63	54	17	1	10	11	10
2018–19	Tampa Bay Lightning	NHL	70	12	42	54	44	2	0	0	0	10
2019–20	Tampa Bay Lightning	NHL	66	11	44	55	31	25	10	12	22	24
2020–21	Tampa Bay Lightning	NHL	54	9	36	45	28	23	2	16	18	8
2021–22	Tampa Bay Lightning	NHL	82	20	65	85	36	23	3	16	19	10
2022–23	Tampa Bay Lightning	NHL	76	9	40	49	42	5	0	3	3	2
2023–24	Tampa Bay Lightning	NHL	78	13	63	76	76	5	1	6	7	0
2024–25	Tampa Bay Lightning	NHL	79	15	51	66	30	5	0	3	3	0
2025–26	Tampa Bay Lightning	NHL	33	1	16	17	10	—	—	—	—	—
SEL totals			82	10	16	26	96	5	1	0	1	4
NHL totals			1,164	172	639	811	782	170	23	97	120	94
KHL totals			26	1	20	21	70	—	—	—	—	—

=== International ===
Year	Team	Event	Result	GP	G	A	Pts	PIM
2007	Sweden	U18	3rd place, bronze medalist(s)	6	1	2	3	10
2008	Sweden	U18	4th	4	1	3	4	10
2008	Sweden	WJC	2nd place, silver medalist(s)	6	0	1	1	4
2009	Sweden	WJC	2nd place, silver medalist(s)	6	0	2	2	6
2010	Sweden	WC	3rd place, bronze medalist(s)	9	1	1	2	6
2012	Sweden	WC	6th	8	0	1	1	14
2016	Sweden	WCH	3rd	4	1	0	1	0
2017	Sweden	WC	1st place, gold medalist(s)	10	2	2	4	6
2024	Sweden	WC	3rd place, bronze medalist(s)	10	1	7	8	2
2025	Sweden	4NF	3rd	3	0	1	1	2
2026	Sweden	OG	7th	5	1	1	2	4
Junior totals				22	2	8	10	30
Senior totals				49	6	13	19	34

== Awards and honours ==
Award	Year	Ref
SHL
Elitserien Rookie of the Year	2009	
Årets Junior - Junior Player of the Year	2009	
KHL
KHL All-Star Game	2013 (did not play)	
NHL
NHL All-Star Game	2017, 2018, 2020, 2022	
NHL Second All-Star Team	2017, 2019, 2020, 2021, 2022, 2025	
James Norris Memorial Trophy	2018	
NHL First All-Star Team	2018	
Stanley Cup champion	2020, 2021	
Conn Smythe Trophy	2020	
International
IIHF World U18 Championship All-Star Team	2007, 2008	
IIHF World U18 Championship Top 3 Player on Team	2007	
IIHF World Junior Championship All-Star Team	2008	
IIHF World Championship Top 3 Player on Team	2017	
Sweden
Guldpucken	2015, 2021	(Note: Normally the Guldpucken is awarded to a player in Sweden, but Hedman won the award for his play in the NHL.)

== Notes ==
Awards and achievements
Preceded by Steven Stamkos	Tampa Bay Lightning first-round draft pick 2009	Succeeded by Carter Ashton
Preceded by Brent Burns	James Norris Memorial Trophy winner 2018	Succeeded by Mark Giordano
Preceded by Ryan O'Reilly	Conn Smythe Trophy winner 2020	Succeeded by Andrei Vasilevskiy
Sporting positions
Preceded by Steven Stamkos	Tampa Bay Lightning captain 2024–present	Incumbent
