= 2017 National Hockey League All-Star Game =

Professional ice hockey exhibition game

2017 NHL All-Star Game

Staples Center, Los Angeles
- January 29, 2017
- Game one: Pacific 10 – 3 Central
- Game two: Metropolitan 10 – 6 Atlantic
- Game three: Metropolitan 4 – 3 Pacific
- MVP: Wayne Simmonds (Metropolitan)
- Attendance: 18,665

The 2017 National Hockey League All-Star Game was held at Staples Center in Los Angeles, home of the Los Angeles Kings on January 29, 2017 at 12:30pm PT. This was the third time that Los Angeles hosted the NHL All-Star Game and the first time since 2002.

The Metropolitan All-Stars won the All-Star Game. The all-star game, which in the past has pitted Eastern Conference against Western Conference, North American against World players, or team captains who pick their teams, had its second straight year of a four-team, 3-on-3, single elimination format, with one team representing each of the league's four divisions. Wayne Simmonds of the Philadelphia Flyers was named the Most Valuable Player, scoring three goals in two games, including the game-winning goal in the championship game.

== Format ==
The 2017 All-Star Game continued to use the 3-on-3 tournament format successfully introduced in 2016, in which teams representing each of the NHL's four divisions (the Atlantic, Metropolitan, Central, and Pacific) played in a single-elimination tournament, with each game consisting of two 10-minute halves played 3-on-3 and going directly to a shootout if tied after 20 minutes. The winning team, the Metropolitan All-Stars, split $1 million.

== Skills Competition ==
The 2017 NHL All-Star Skills Competition was held on January 28, 2017. As with 2016, the event featured the Skills Challenge Relay, accuracy shooting, fastest skater, hardest shot, and shootout challenges. For 2017, the breakaway competition was dropped and replaced by a new event, the Four Line Challenge, in which four shooters from each team took shots at the goal from various positions on the ice.

For the first time, the Skills Competition had a direct impact on the All-Star Game itself; the winning team was given the right to select their semi-final opponent during the tournament, and whether they would play in the first or second semifinal.

The Atlantic Division won the competition with 9 points, Pacific Division with 7, Metropolitan Division with 5, and Central Division with 3.

== Rosters ==
In an effort to avoid a repeat of the 2016 fan voting process, where journeyman John Scott won the fan vote and thus the right to play in the game, fans were given a predetermined ballot of players from whom to choose captains. On January 2, 2017, after weeks of fan voting, the four captains were announced by the NHL. Carey Price of the Montreal Canadiens was selected captain for the Atlantic Division. Sidney Crosby of the Pittsburgh Penguins was selected for the Metropolitan Division, with P. K. Subban of the Nashville Predators captaining the Central Division and Connor McDavid of the Edmonton Oilers captaining the Pacific Division respectively.

The rest of the rosters were revealed on January 10, 2017, with each of the NHL's 30 teams being represented by at least one player at the time the rosters were announced. NHL rules that dictated that the head coach of the team with the highest points percentage in each of the four divisions through games of Tuesday, Jan. 10 – the halfway point of the regular season – would coach their respective divisions. The head coaches selected were Michel Therrien (Montreal Canadiens) for the Atlantic Division, Bruce Boudreau (Minnesota Wild) for the Central Division, John Tortorella (Columbus Blue Jackets) for the Metropolitan Division, and Peter DeBoer (San Jose Sharks) for the Pacific Division. Tortorella announced that he had to miss the game due to a family emergency and was replaced by Wayne Gretzky (who had not coached hockey since leaving the then-Phoenix Coyotes in 2009).

Atlantic Division
Head coach: (Canada) Michel Therrien, Montreal Canadiens
Nat.	Player	Team	Pos.	#
(Canada)	Carey Price (C)	Montreal Canadiens	G	31
(Finland)	Tuukka Rask	Boston Bruins	G	40
(Russia)	Nikita Kucherov	Tampa Bay Lightning	F	86
(Canada)	Brad Marchand	Boston Bruins	F	63
(United States)	Auston Matthews	Toronto Maple Leafs	F	34
(Denmark)	Frans Nielsen	Detroit Red Wings	F	51
(United States)	Kyle Okposo	Buffalo Sabres	F	21
(United States)	Vincent Trocheck	Florida Panthers	F	21
(Sweden)	Victor Hedman	Tampa Bay Lightning	D	77
(Sweden)	Erik Karlsson	Ottawa Senators	D	65
(Canada)	Shea Weber	Montreal Canadiens	D	6

Metropolitan Division
Head coach: (Canada) Wayne Gretzky
Nat.	Player	Team	Pos.	#
(Russia)	Sergei Bobrovsky	Columbus Blue Jackets	G	72
(Canada)	Braden Holtby	Washington Capitals	G	70
(Canada)	Sidney Crosby (C)	Pittsburgh Penguins	F	87
(Canada)	Taylor Hall	New Jersey Devils	F	9
(Russia)	Alexander Ovechkin	Washington Capitals	F	8
(Canada)	Wayne Simmonds	Philadelphia Flyers	F	17
(Canada)	John Tavares	New York Islanders	F	91
(United States)	Justin Faulk	Carolina Hurricanes	D	27
(United States)	Seth Jones	Columbus Blue Jackets	D	3
(United States)	Ryan McDonagh	New York Rangers	D	27
(United States)	Cam Atkinson^{†}	Columbus Blue Jackets	F	13

- ^{†} Replacing Evgeni Malkin due to injury.

Central Division
Head coach: (Canada) Bruce Boudreau, Minnesota Wild
Nat.	Player	Team	Pos.	#
(Canada)	Corey Crawford	Chicago Blackhawks	G	50
(Canada)	Devan Dubnyk	Minnesota Wild	G	40
(Finland)	Patrik Laine	Winnipeg Jets	F	29
(United States)	Patrick Kane	Chicago Blackhawks	F	88
(Canada)	Nathan MacKinnon	Colorado Avalanche	F	29
(Canada)	Tyler Seguin	Dallas Stars	F	91
(Russia)	Vladimir Tarasenko	St. Louis Blues	F	91
(Canada)	Jonathan Toews	Chicago Blackhawks	F	19
(Canada)	P. K. Subban (C)	Nashville Predators	D	76
(United States)	Ryan Suter	Minnesota Wild	D	20
(Canada)	Duncan Keith	Chicago Blackhawks	D	2

Pacific Division
Head coach: (Canada) Peter DeBoer, San Jose Sharks
Nat.	Player	Team	Pos.	#
(Canada)	Martin Jones	San Jose Sharks	G	31
(Canada)	Mike Smith	Arizona Coyotes	G	41
(Canada)	Connor McDavid (C)	Edmonton Oilers	F	97
(Canada)	Jeff Carter	Los Angeles Kings	F	77
(United States)	Johnny Gaudreau	Calgary Flames	F	13
(Canada)	Bo Horvat	Vancouver Canucks	F	53
(United States)	Ryan Kesler	Anaheim Ducks	F	17
(United States)	Joe Pavelski	San Jose Sharks	F	8
(Canada)	Brent Burns	San Jose Sharks	D	88
(Canada)	Drew Doughty	Los Angeles Kings	D	8
(United States)	Cam Fowler	Anaheim Ducks	D	4

== Bracket ==
The division that won the Skills Competition during the previous night got to choose their first opponent in the 3-on-3 tournament, and whether they play in the first or second semifinal game. The Atlantic Division won the Skills Competition and chose to play the Metropolitan Division in the second semifinal.

Semi-Finals		Final
Central	3
Pacific	10	Pacific	3
Atlantic	6	Metropolitan	4
Metropolitan	10

== Uniforms ==
Unlike the previous game, where all four teams had been issued two sets of All-Star uniforms of the same design, the NHL opted to dress each divisional team in a unique color for this game. The primary colors of the uniforms incorporated the historical colors of the host Los Angeles Kings: black for the Pacific division, purple for the Central Division, gold for the Atlantic Division, and white for the Metropolitan Division. The striping, which included stars at the waistline, paid homage to the All-Star uniforms of the 1980s and early 1990s. The number typeface was based upon the design of the Hollywood sign.

== Game summaries ==
=== First semifinal game ===
January 29, 2017	Pacific	10–3	Central	Staples Center	Recap
02:57 – Cam Fowler (1); 03:39 – Jeff Carter (1); 07:13 – Connor McDavid (1); 08:00 – Brent Burns (1); 09:49 – Drew Doughty (1)		First period	Jonathan Toews (1) – 07:07
02:33 – Johnny Gaudreau (1); 04:15 – Joe Pavelski (1); 05:43 – Ryan Kesler (1); 06:29 – Bo Horvat (1); 06:42 – Johnny Gaudreau (2)		Second period	P.K. Subban (1) – 02:14; Vladimir Tarasenko (1) – 04:39
No period		Third period	No period
Mike Smith 2 saves / 3 shots Martin Jones 7 saves / 9 shots		Goalie stats	Corey Crawford 6 saves / 11 shots Devan Dubnyk 6 saves / 11 shots

=== Second semifinal game ===
January 29, 2017	Metropolitan	10–6	Atlantic	Staples Center	Recap
02:12 – Wayne Simmonds (1); 04:49 – Wayne Simmonds (2); 08:45 – John Tavares (1)		First period	Nikita Kucherov (1) – 04:06; Victor Hedman (1) – 06:30; Erik Karlsson (1) – 07:13
01:31 – John Tavares (2); 01:45 – Seth Jones (1); 01:50 – Taylor Hall (1); 06:26 – Sidney Crosby (1); 06:35 – Cam Atkinson (1); 07:45 – en – Cam Atkinson (2); 09:59 – Alexander Ovechkin (1)		Second period	Auston Matthews (1) – 00:50; Nikita Kucherov (2) – 03:15; Vincent Trocheck (1) – 08:54
No period		Third period	No period
Sergei Bobrovsky 7 saves / 10 shots Braden Holtby 12 saves / 15 shots		Goalie stats	Carey Price 3 saves / 6 shots Tuukka Rask 8 saves / 14 shots

=== Final ===
January 29, 2017	Metropolitan	4–3	Pacific	Staples Center	Recap
01:25 – Seth Jones (2); 4:40 – Connor McDavid (2)		First period	Joe Pavelski (2) – 00:22; Justin Faulk (1) – 04:09; Bo Horvat (2) – 07:52
04:57 – Cam Atkinson (3); 05:02 – Wayne Simmonds (3)		Second period	No scoring
No period		Third period	No period
Sergei Bobrovsky 9 saves / 12 shots Braden Holtby 5 saves / 5 shots		Goalie stats	Martin Jones 5 saves / 7 shots Mike Smith 9 saves / 11 shots

== Festivities and entertainment ==
Additional festivities and events were held alongside All-Star weekend, some of which were held in conjunction with the NHL's centennial commemoration. The NHL's travelling centennial exhibits were situated in Los Angeles for the event, and the NHL Fan Fair was held at the Los Angeles Convention Center. A public skating rink was built across from the All-Star Game's venue of Staples Center.

On January 27, 2017, the NHL 100 Gala was held at Microsoft Theater, in which the NHL unveiled the remainder of its top 100 players of all-time (the first 33, representing players who played prior to 1966, were unveiled during a pre-game ceremony at the NHL Centennial Classic earlier in the month). The special was hosted by Jon Hamm, and featured appearances by Michael J. Fox, Al Michaels, Keanu Reeves, and Alex Trebek, and performances by John Legend, and John Ondrasik.

Carly Rae Jepsen sang the Canadian national anthem. Pop group Fifth Harmony were scheduled to sing the U.S. anthem, but pulled out after one of their members had fallen ill. They were replaced by singer Courtney Daniels, a member of the Los Angeles Kings' ice cleaning crew (she performed similar duties during the game, and also assisted in presenting the MVP award after its conclusion). Snoop Dogg (under the alias DJ Snoopadelic) performed during player introductions for the skills competition. Before the game, the teams were introduced by four celebrities, each representing their home division: Atlantic - Wayne Gretzky, Metropolitan - Tim Robbins, Central - Chris O'Donnell, Pacific - Colin Hanks.

=== Celebrity Shootout ===
A celebrity game was held on January 28, 2017; the game was played between a team of celebrities coached by Wayne Gretzky (including Canadian singer Justin Bieber), and a team of NHL alumni coached by Mario Lemieux.

==== Game Summary ====
January 28, 2017	Team Gretzky	5–3	Team Lemieux	Staples Center

== Television ==
In the United States, the All-Star Game was broadcast by NBC, marking the All-Star Game's return to network television for the second time since 2004. In Canada, it was broadcast on both CBC and Sportsnet, and on TVA Sports in French.
