= Ondřej Palát =

Czech ice hockey player (born 1991)

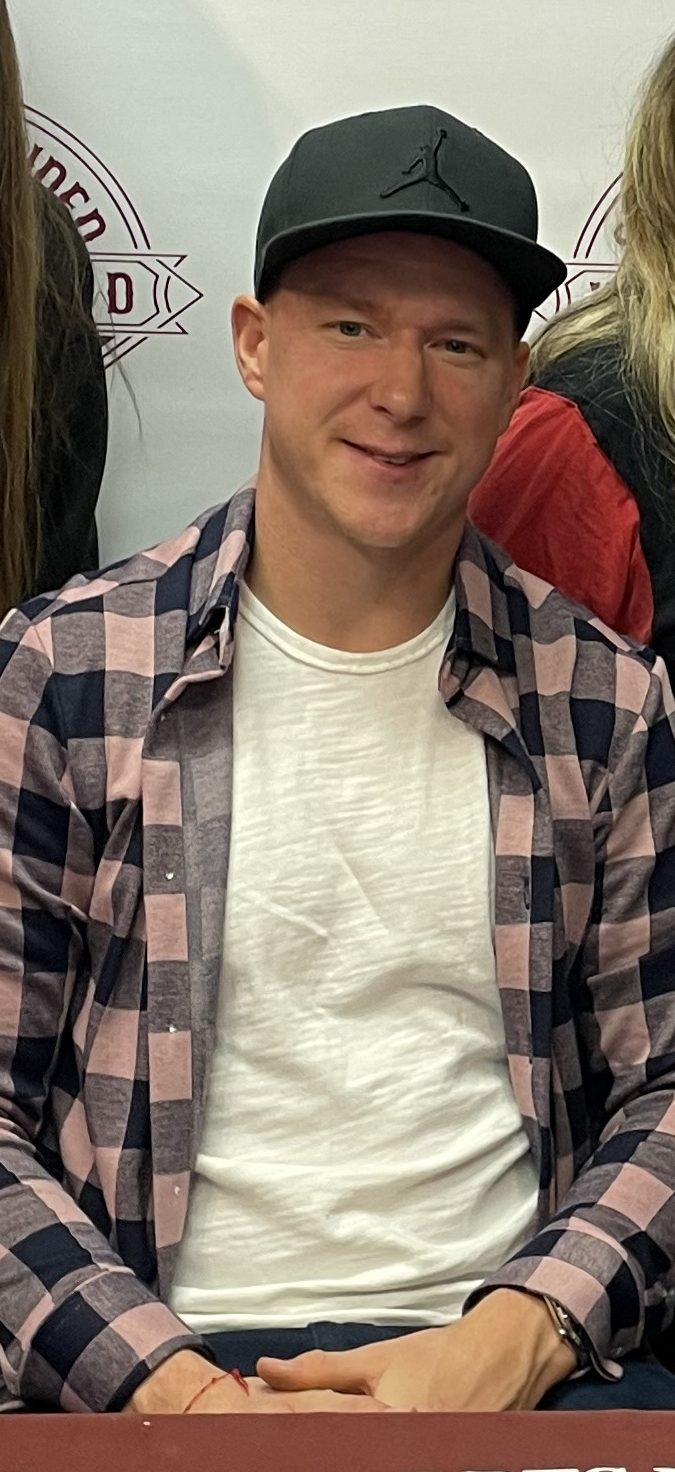
- Palát in October 2023
- Born: 28 March 1991 (age 35) Frýdek-Místek, Czechoslovakia
- Height: 6 ft 0 in (183 cm)
- Weight: 194 lb (88 kg; 13 st 12 lb)
- Position: Winger
- Shoots: Left
- NHL team Former teams: New York Islanders; Tampa Bay Lightning; New Jersey Devils
- National team: Czech Republic
- NHL draft: 208th overall, 2011; Tampa Bay Lightning
- Playing career: 2011–present

Ondřej Palát (born 28 March 1991) is a Czech professional ice hockey player who is a winger for the New York Islanders of the National Hockey League (NHL). He was drafted in the seventh round, 208th overall, by the Tampa Bay Lightning at the 2011 NHL entry draft. Palát won the Stanley Cup back-to-back with the Lightning in 2020 and 2021.

== Playing career ==
=== Junior ===
Palát began his ice hockey career in his native Czech Republic with HC Frýdek-Místek.

=== QMJHL ===
Following the 2007–08 season, Palát was drafted by the Seattle Thunderbirds in the second round of the 2008 Canadian Hockey League (CHL) Import Draft. However, before being able to play for the team, his playing rights were traded to the Chilliwack Bruins. Although he was eligible for the 2008 NHL entry draft, Palát went undrafted as had a less productive season and was recovering from mononucleosis. However, Drummondville Voltigeurs's assistant general manager André Ruel had scouted Palát in 2008 and was aware that Palát would only go to North America once he had finished school. As such, the Voltigeurs drafted him 10th overall in the 2009 Quebec Major Junior Hockey League (QMJHL) European Draft when he was 19.

Palát joined the Voltigeurs for the 2009–10 season, which was also the first season former NHLer Denis Gauthier served as a coach. Although Gauthier was originally sceptical of Palát's ability to play in the QMJHL, he was named to the team's roster and finished the season with 40 points in 59 games. After going undrafted again in the 2010 NHL entry draft, Palát returned to the Voltigeurs for the 2010–11 season. Palát received early recognition from the league after recording six points over two games in mid-October to help lift the Voltigeurs to second place in the overall standings. He was recognized again later that month with the Star of the Week honour after recording seven points over four games. By 4 November, Palát had accumulated 11 goals and 13 assists over 24 games. He continued to score goals through November and led all import players with 38 points by 24 November. Palát was named the QMJHL's Third Star of the Week for the week ending on 28 November, after scoring four goals and two assists over two games. The following month, during a game against the Rouyn-Noranda Huskies, Palát and teammate Sean Couturier became the second and third QMJHL players to reach 50-points in the season. As such, he was recognized as the QMJHL's First Star of the Week and strongly considered for CHL Player of the Week. By 24 December, Palát ranked second in the QMJHL with 25 goals and 29 assists through 34 games. He was also named to the Czech junior team roster for the second consecutive year. Palát finished the 2010–11 season with a career-high 39 goals and 57 assists for 96 points.

Leading up to the 2011 NHL entry draft, the Tampa Bay Lightning had planned to invite Palát to a tryout as a free agent if he remained undrafted. However, during the draft, the Lightning acquired an extra seventh-round pick at the last minute and used it to draft Palát 208th overall.

=== Tampa Bay Lightning (2011–2022) ===
After attending the Lightning's 2011 training camp, Palát signed a three-year, entry-level contract and joined their American Hockey League (AHL) affiliate, the Norfolk Admirals, for the 2011–12 season. Due to his young age, the Admirals kept Palát in the AHL instead of returning him to the OHL or assigning him to the ECHL. In January 2012, head coach Jon Cooper placed him on a line with Richard Pánik and Tyler Johnson (nicknamed the "Top Gun Line." This move coincided with the Admiral's North American record of 28 consecutive games. As the Admirals qualified for the 2012 Calder Cup playoffs, Palát had recorded 30 points through 61 games. In game 4 of the Calder Cup finals against the Toronto Marlies, Palát assisted on one of Mike Kostka's goals to lift the Admirals to their first AHL championship. This would be their last Calder Cup trophy under the name Admirals as the Lightning announced they had accepted the Syracuse Crunch as their new AHL affiliate.

Palát returned to the AHL for the 2012–13 season and played for the Syracuse Crunch. Despite the location change of the team, Palát remained on a line with Johnson and Panik and began to improve on his rookie seasons points total. Through the first month of the 2012–13 season, Palát tied for sixth in the league with seven assists. He suffered an ankle injury at the end of January and missed six games to recover. He returned to the Crunch's lineup on 14 February, in a 6–0 win over the Albany Devils. Later that month, Palát recorded his first professional hat-trick on 26 February, against the Rochester Americans to help the Crunch continue their eight-game win streak. Shortly thereafter, he earned his first NHL call-up on 3 March, due to an injury to Benoit Pouliot. At the time, he led the team in goals and ranked third with points. Palát subsequently made his NHL debut the following night against the Pittsburgh Penguins and recorded his first NHL point with an assist on Tom Pyatt's goal. Later, on 16 March, he scored his first career NHL goal against Justin Peters of the Carolina Hurricanes. On 25 March 2013, Crunch head coach Jon Cooper replaced Guy Boucher as the Lightnings newest head coach. Rob Zettler was subsequently appointed the Crunch's head coach as they attempted to qualify the 2013 Calder Cup playoffs. Due to the NHL's waiver rules, Palát was required to be assigned to the Crunch by 3 pm EST on 3 April 2013, in order to play in the Calder Cup playoffs. Over the final nine games of the regular-season, Palát recorded three goals and 10 assists for 13 points. As all three were playing in the NHL, the "Top Gun Line" was reunited for the first time since 2 March in game 1 of the Eastern Conference quarterfinals. In their first game back together, Palát and Johnson tallied three points while Panik scored the game-winning overtime goal to lift the Crunch over the Portland Pirates. By game 3, Palát had recorded five points and the trio combined for 12 as the Crunch led the series 2–0. Palát scored the series-winning overtime goal of game 4 to lead the Crunch over the Pirates and into the Eastern Conference semifinals. After eliminating the Crunch, Palát and the "Top Gun Line" continued their dominance against the Springfield Falcons. Over three games, Palát and Johnson both had eight points while Panik had five. The Crunch swept the Falcons in four games to qualify for the Calder Cup conference finals for the first time in 17 years. After winning Games 2, 3, and 4, Palát set numerous franchise and league records en route to the Calder Cup finals. While the Crunch eliminated the Wilkes-Barre/Scranton Penguins with a 7–0 shutout, Palát's 20 points led the league and were the third most recorded in Crunch playoff history. He also set a new single-season playoff scoring record and tied the franchise record for most assists in a single playoff game with three. However, the "Top Gun Line" struggled in the finals after losing Panik to an injury, and the Crunch eventually fell to the Grand Rapids Griffins in six games.

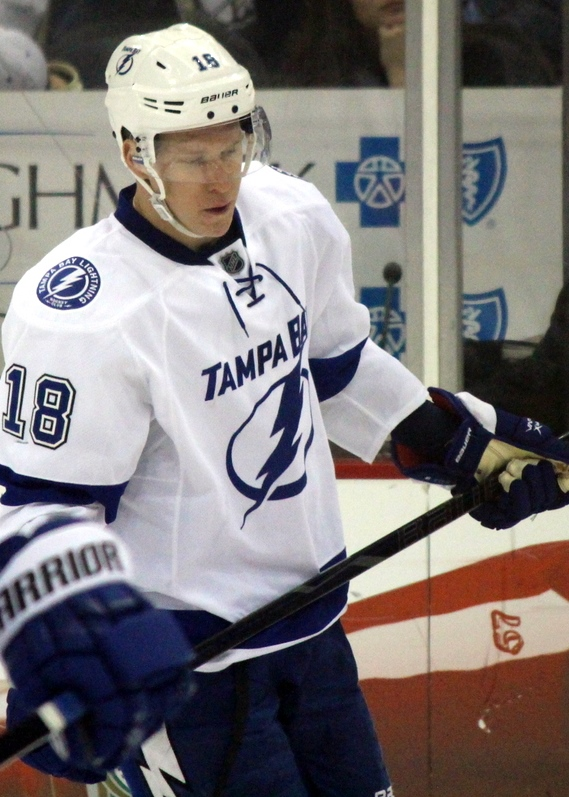
Palát with the Tampa Bay Lightning in March 2014.

Palát participated in the Lightning's 2013 training camp and preseason games before making their 2013–14 opening night roster alongside top gun linemates Tyler Johnson and Richard Pánik. The trio were reunited at the NHL level, where they continued their dominance, and were often referred to as "The Kid Line" instead of "Top Guns" by local media. They started the season playing on the third line but slowly began earning more playing time and more responsibility. By the end of November, the trio had combined for 30 points and were praised by coach Cooper for their development and maturity. However, following a leg injury to Steven Stamkos, head coach Jon Cooper broke up the trio and put Palát and Johnson with Martin St. Louis. Palát later stated that playing with St. Louis boosted his confidence and made him feel "emboldened to use his skills." Palát set a new franchise rookie record for longest points streak by tallying four goals and six assists between 23 December to 9 January. While maintaining this streak, Palát was also selected for the Czech Republic national team to compete at the 2014 Winter Olympics. By the end of January, Palát ranked third among rookies with 20 assists and fourth with 31 points. His efforts were recognized by the NHL who awarded him the Rookie of the Month accolade. Following St. Louis' trade to the New York Rangers in March, Palát recorded four goals and nine points over seven games. He was named the NHL's Rookie of the Month after recording five goals and 11 assists through 16 games in the month of March. At the time, he also ranked second among all rookies with 32 assists and 51 points. Once Stamkos recovered from his broken leg and was named captain of the Lighting in earl-March, Johnson and Palát were split up for the first time in the season. Stamkos spoke highly of Palát after becoming his linemate in March: "You see the way he plays, the work ethic he has, the skill set he has, the confidence he's gaining each and every game. He's an unbelievable player. You'd love to play with a guy like that." Palát finished the season leading the Lightning in scoring with 23 goals and 36 assists for 59 points in 81 games, helping the Lighting qualify for the playoffs for the first time since 2011. As such, Palát was named a finalist for the Calder Memorial Trophy, awarded to the NHL's rookie of the year, along with teammate Tyler Johnson. Palát, along with Johnson, became the first teammates to be nominated for the Trophy since Patrick Kane and Jonathan Toews of the Chicago Blackhawks in 2008. Although the Calder went to Nathan MacKinnon of the Colorado Avalanche, Palát was named to the NHL All-Rookie Team. On 20 April 2014, Palát recorded his first career playoff goal and point against Carey Price in the Lightning's game three 3–2 loss to the Montreal Canadiens. In the Lighting's first round four-game sweep at the hands of the Montreal Canadiens in the opening round of the 2014 playoffs, Palát

Following his strong rookie season, the Lightning signed Palát to a three-year $10 million contract extension on 9 June. Palát, Johnson, and Pánik were reunited at the Lightning's 2014 training camp but were unable to play together during the 2014–15 season as Pánik was picked up by the Toronto Maple Leafs on 9 October 2014, while on waivers. As such, Palát and Johnson played on a line with Brett Connolly until he suffered an injury on 24 October, in a game against the Winnipeg Jets. Due to various injuries throughout the lineup, head coach Jon Cooper placed the duo on a line with Nikita Kucherov for the second and third periods. Cooper later coined their nickname 'The Triplets' as he was inspired by his twin daughters and felt they were "on the same wavelength; it's like they're triplets." Palát recorded 19 points over the Lightning's next 29 games before missing two games in December due to an injury. Once Palát returned to the lineup, the "Triplets line" continued to collect points and helped the Lightning end the 2014 calendar year with four straight wins. Over a seven-game period, in which the Lightning won six of seven games, Palát led the "Triplets line" with 13 points while Kucherov and Johnson tied with 11. While Palát had accumulated fewer overall points than his linemates, head coach Jon Cooper referred to him as "the straw that stirs the drink on that line" and called him a potential Selke Trophy winner. Before suffering a lower-body injury in a game against the Montreal Canadiens on 10 March 2015, Palát had collected 15 goals and 37 assists up to that point. He was one of three Lightning players expected to miss weeks of gameplay after being injured in that game. The "Triplets line" finished the season combining for 48 goals and only allowing 23 to be scored against them. Palát finished with 16 goals and a career-high and team-high 47 assists as all three set new career-highs in points. The "Triplets line" played a significant role in the Lightning's push to qualify for the 2015 playoffs. However, they struggled in the first round against the Detroit Red Wings. Palát went pointless over the first three games while Johnson and Kucherov combined for only three points. This changed in game 4 as Palát scored his first goal of the postseason, which was also the game-tying goal, to help the Lightning tie the series 2–2. The trio finished the series combining for 14 points over seven games and advanced to the second round for the first time since 2011. In their six-game series with the Montreal Canadiens, the "Triplets line" combined for 17 points en route to the Eastern Conference finals for the first time since 2011. After beating the Canadiens, the Lightning faced the New York Rangers and defeated them in seven games. Although the Rangers won game 1, Palát was named the Third Star of the Game for scoring the Lightning's only goal in the 2–1 loss. Following the Lightning's win over the Rangers in game 2, the "Triplets line" earned praise from opponent Dan Boyle for their creativity. He also said that the trio "reminded him of how the game was played 10 years ago." All three members of the "Triplets line" scored goals in the Lightning's 6–5 overtime win to clinch game 3. Palát was named the Second Star of the Game for tallying two goals and one assist. After being pushed to game 7, Palát scored one of the Lightning's two goals to send the team to the Stanley Cup Final for the first time since 2004. By the end of the seven-game series, the trio had combined for 11 goals and 24 overall points. While the trio continued to accumulate points in the Cup Final, they fell to the Chicago Blackhawks in six games. Palát finished the playoffs with eight goals and eight assists for 14 points.

Following their deep playoff run, Palát reunited with Johnson and Kucherov for the Lightning's exhibition games before the start of the 2015–16 regular season. However, the trio struggled offensively through the team's first 13 games and were limited to only three even-strength points. As such, coach Jon Cooper split them up on different lines, and Palát and Kucherov were promoted to the Lightning's top line with Stamkos. Shortly after joining the top line, Palát suffered a lower-body injury and was expected to miss three to five weeks. At the time of the injury, he had two goals and five assists through 16 games. Palát missed 12 games to recover from an ankle injury but was re-injured two games after returning on 12 December 2015. He missed another eight games before returning on 2 January 2016, for the Lightning's 3–2 win over the Minnesota Wild. In his return, Palát was reunited on a line with Kucherov and Johnson and recorded an assist. In the seven games following his return, the team had a 6–1 record and maintained a five-game winning streak. Over those seven games, Palát recorded one goal and three assists while often playing with Stamkos and Vladislav Namestnikov. Through late February and early March, the Lightning set a new franchise record with nine consecutive wins. In their record-setting win on 5 March, against the Carolina Hurricanes, the "Triplets line" were briefly reunited and combined for three goals and three assists. Over their seventh, eight, and ninth wins, Johnson, Palát and Kucherov combined for 12 points. Although their win streak was stymied at nine, Palát tied a franchise record a few games later against the Columbus Blue Jackets. Palát and Stamkos both recorded shorthanded goals within 3:45 of each other to become the first set of teammates to score shorthanded goals in the same game since 2003. Palát tallied 22 points over the Lightning's final 22 games of the season and helped them qualify for the 2016 Stanley Cup playoffs. He finished the season with 16 goals and 24 assists for 40 points through 62 games. While it was expected that the "Triplets line" would be reunited for their second consecutive first round meeting against the Detroit Red Wings (largely due to captain Steven Stamkos being sidelined due to a blood clot), Palát was relegated to a line with Valtteri Filppula and Jonathan Drouin. In game 4's 3–2 win, Palát scored the game-winning goal against Petr Mrazek to give the Lighting a 3–1 series lead to extend the Lightning's series lead and push the Red Wings to a final death game 5. After eliminating the Red Wings, Palát was reunited with Tyler Johnson and Nikita Kucherov for the second round against the New York Islanders. In their first game back together, Palát and Kuckerov both assisted on one of Johnson's two goals to help the Lightning even the series 1–1. After eliminating the Islanders in five games, Palát and the Lightning qualified for the Eastern Conference finals for the second consecutive year. For their series against the Penguins, the "Triplets line" was again split up and Palát joined Alex Killorn and Jonathan Drouin on the Lightning's second line. All three members of this line scored in game 1 to help the Lightning beat the Penguins 3–1. However, as the Lightning began to struggle offensively, the "Triplets line" were periodically reunited in an effort to boost the team's scoring. While reunited in game 3, Johnson and Palat scored one goal each but could not match the Penguin's lead. They were more successful in game 5 and combined for the Lightning's game-tying goal by Nikita Kucherov to put the Lightning within one win of a second consecutive appearance in the 2016 Stanley Cup Final.

Despite earning 94 points during the 2016–17 season, the Lightning failed to qualify for the Stanley Cup playoffs for the first time since 2013. Palát struggled offensively at the start of the season and tallied only one goal and three assists through the team's first 12 games. He broke a seven-game pointless drought on 7 November 2016, by tallying his second goal of the season against the Florida Panthers. By early December, the "Triplets line" had been reunited but Palát continued to struggle to produce offensively. The "Triplets line" was unable to stick together for long as both Palát and Kucherov suffered injuries. After missing numerous games, both players returned on 28 December, and the "Triplets line" combined for six points in a win over the Canadiens. He missed two games due to a lower-body injury on 2 February, but returned to form on 10 February. The trio combined for eight points in a 4–1 win over the Edmonton Oilers on 27 February, to help the Lightning extend their points streak to seven games.

On 14 July 2017, Palát was signed by the Lightning to a five-year contract with an average annual value of $5.3 million. Following the signing of his contract, Palát returned to the Lightning for the 2017–18 season and helped them maintain their best start in franchise history. On 2 December 2017, Palát recorded his 160th career assist to tie with Chris Gratton for 11th-most assists in franchise history. The following month, Palát suffered a lower-body injury after being slashed during a game against the Minnesota Wild and was expected to miss six to eight weeks to recover. At the time of the injury, Palát had eight goals and 22 assists for 30 points over 46 games.

Palát struggled during the 2018–19 season and finished with eight goals and 26 assists 34 points, his fewest since 2013–14. Part of the reason for this scoring dip was the numerous injuries Palát suffered during the season. After playing through an injury he suffered in late October, Palát was sidelined for four weeks to recover. At the time, he had recorded no goals and five assists through nine games. He returned to the Lightning's lineup on 29 November, after missing 16 games. Palát remained healthy through December to early February and played in his 400th career game on 5 February 2019, against the Vegas Golden Knights. Shortly after reaching this milestone, Palát missed two games with an upper-body injury but returned to the Lightning's lineup on 14 February. As the season progressed, the Lightning became the fourth NHL team to win at least 59 games in a season after beating the Boston Bruins on 25 March. Palát left that game in the first period due to an upper-body injury but returned to the lineup the following game. Despite winning the Presidents' Trophy as the team with the best overall record during the regular season, the Lightning were unexpectedly swept in four games by the Blue Jackets in the first round. Palát recorded one goal and one assist over all four games played. Due to their early exit from the playoffs, Palát was able to compete with the Czech Republic men's national team in the 2019 World Championship.

Over the 2019 offseason, Palát focused on improving his sprints, cores and jumps, to improve his cardio and stamina while skating. In November, Palát set numerous personal records. On 23 November 2019, Palát recorded his 100th career NHL goal in a 6–2 win over the Anaheim Ducks. Two days later, on 25 November, Palát recorded his 200th career NHL assist and 300th career NHL point in a 5–2 win over the Buffalo Sabres. Palát was the eighth Lightning player to record 200 career assists and 10th Lightning player to record 300 career points. When the NHL returned to play in July for the 2020 playoffs, it was decided that 24 teams would play in a bubble hub in either Toronto or Edmonton due to the ongoing COVID-19 pandemic. Palát and the Lightning faced the Columbus Blue Jackets in the first round for the second consecutive season. Despite not scoring any goals in their first-round series, Palát and the Lightning defeated the Blue Jackets in five games to advance to the Eastern Conference semifinals against the Bruins. Palát scored his first goal of the playoffs, and his first overtime playoff goal, in game 2 to even the series 1–1. While playing alongside Kucherov and Brayden Point (mainly due to a core muscle injury from Steven Stamkos) and the line being dubbed as "Triplets 2.0", Palát continued to accumulate points and swiftly recorded goals in three straight games. After scoring two goals in game 4, he tied the franchise's second-longest playoff goal streak record. He scored his fifth goal in four games in game 5 to help the Lightning defeat the Presidents Trophy-winning Bruins in five games in the second round and advance to the Eastern Conference finals for the fourth time in six seasons. By scoring this goal, Palát joined Vincent Lecavalier, Martin St. Louis and Steven Stamkos as the only players in franchise history to record goals in four consecutive playoff games. Palát and the Lightning faced the New York Islanders in the third round. In game 1, Palát set a new franchise record for longest goal streak in a postseason by scoring one of the Lightning's eight goals in their win. He also became the only player in the 2020 playoffs to maintain a five-game goal streak and tied Tyler Johnson for third-most goals in the franchise's playoff history. Palát continued to spend the majority of the six-game series on the Lightning's top line with Point and Kucherov. He tied for second on the team with four points over the six games while the trio combined for 21 points. Upon defeating the Islanders, the Lightning competed in their first Stanley Cup Final since losing to the Chicago Blackhawks in 2015. In game 3 of the 2020 Stanley Cup Final against the Dallas Stars, Palát scored his 10th goal of the postseason on Anton Khudobin to help the Lightning beat the Stars 5–2. As such, Tampa Bay became the first team to have three players record 10 or more goals in a single playoff year since 2010. Palát and the Lightning won their second Stanley Cup in franchise history as they defeated the Stars in six games.

In light of pandemic restrictions on cross-border travel, the NHL temporarily realigned its structure for the 2020–21 season and reduced the season to 56 games. As such, the Lightning, Hurricanes, Blackhawks, Blue Jackets, Stars, Red Wings, Panthers, and Predators competed in the Central Division and only against each other. When the Lightning began their season on 13 January, Palát was reunited on the top line with Point and Stamkos. As a member of the top unit, Palát helped the Lightning to six consecutive wins before it was snapped by the Panthers on 11 February. Amid their win streak, the Lightning moved Palát to the right-hand side where he immediately scored four goals. However, Palát's production started to cease as the Lightning began a lengthy winning slump through March and early April. While he continued to collect assists, Palát ended his 13-game goalless drought on 22 April, against the Columbus Blue Jackets. Upon breaking out of the slump, Palát led the Lightning with two goals and four assists over a week of gameplay and maintained a five-game point streak. Palát recorded two assists in the Lightning's win over the Blackhawks on 27 April, to help the team qualify for the 2021 Stanley Cup playoffs. Palát sat out of the Lightning's final game of the regular season due to a lower-body injury. As such, he finished the regular season with 15 goals and 31 assists for 46 points.

Palát returned to the Lightning's lineup for game 1 of the first round of the playoffs against the Florida Panthers. He scored the game-winning goal in game 2 on Sergei Bobrovsky to help the Lightning to a 2–0 series lead. After scoring a goal in game 4, Palát passed Martin St. Louis for second place on the franchise's all-time playoff goals scored list. Once the Lightning eliminated the Panthers, they met with the Hurricanes in the second round. In the Lightning's series-clinching game 5, Palát received a two-minute minor following a hit to the head of Brett Pesce but faced no further discipline. By the end of the series, Palát set a franchise record for most postseason goals away from home ice with 18. After defeating the Islanders in the third round for a second consecutive year this time in seven games, the Lightning faced the Montreal Canadiens in the 2021 Stanley Cup Final. They beat the Canadiens in five games to win back-to-back Stanley Cup championships and third in team history altogether. Palát finished the postseason with five goals and eight assists for 13 points in all 23 games and with the Lightning's franchise record in playoff game-winning goals with nine and ranked second in total postseason goals with 37.

Before the start of the 2021–22 season, Palát was named to the Czech Republic team to compete at the 2022 Winter Olympics. However, they failed to qualify for the Olympics after losing to Switzerland in the group stage and NHL players were unable to participate due to the spread of the omicron variant of COVID-19. Palát recorded his 400th career point on 4 January 2022, by tallying two goals in the Lightning's 7–2 win over the Columbus Blue Jackets. He subsequently became the seventh player in franchise history and the eighth member of his draft class (out of 211) to reach this milestone. Palát scored the two goals over the Lightning's next two games for seven points over eight games. After missing numerous games due to an injury, Palát set another milestone by skating in his 590th career game. As such, he passed Johnson and moved into seventh place on the franchise's all-time games played list. Palát then went through a 28-game goalless drought that started on 11 January. He broke this streak by scoring a goal on 10 April, in a 5–0 win over the Buffalo Sabres. He finished the season with three assists by helping on all three of Stamkos' goals against the New York Islanders in the season finale ending with 18 goals and 31 assists for 49 points in 77 contests.

=== New Jersey Devils (2022–2026) ===
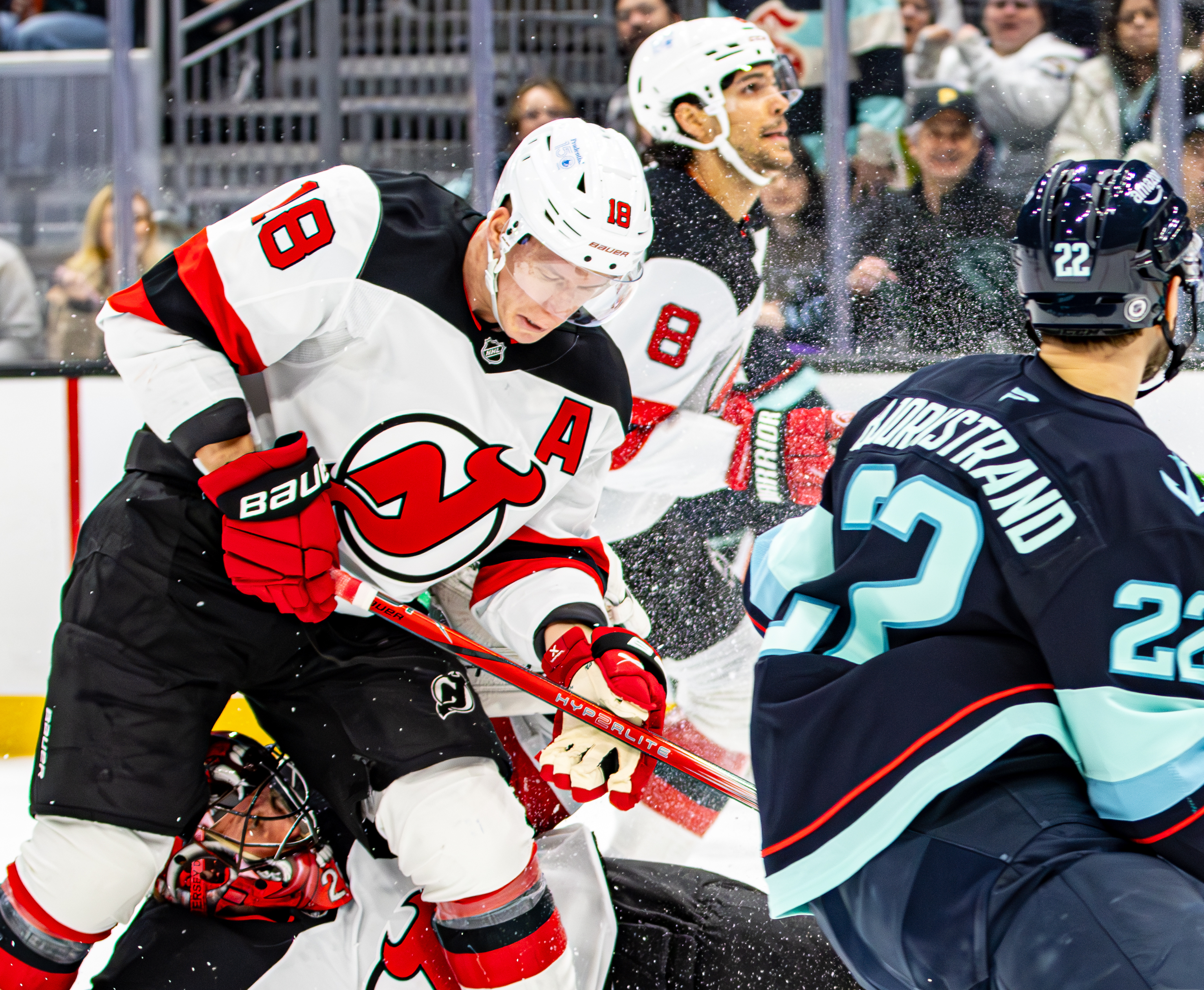
Palát (left) with the New Jersey Devils in January 2025.

Following his 10th season in the NHL with the Lightning, Palát left the club as a free agent and signed a five-year, $30 million contract with the New Jersey Devils. He recorded three goals over his first six games with the Devils in the 2022–23 season before suffering a groin injury. He underwent surgery to repair the issue and missed all of November and December to recover. He was activated off injured reserve on 5 January, and made his return that night against the St. Louis Blues. Palát skated through 18 shifts and played 14:24 minutes of ice time in the 5–3 loss. He scored two goals over the final two months of the regular season and finished with eight goals and 15 assists in 49 games as the Devils reached the playoffs for the first time since 2018.

On 14 November 2023, Palát recorded his 300th career assist after earning a point on Timo Meier's fifth goal of the season. He subsequently became the 27th Czech Republic native with 300 or more career assists in the NHL. Later that season, Palát played in his 700th career game on 5 December, against the Vancouver Canucks.

As Palát's tenure with the Devils continued, his contract frequently became cited by fans and media as one of the worst contracts relative to on-ice play in the NHL, and the Devils began looking to remove his cap hit in order to relieve themselves of salary cap space.

=== New York Islanders (2026–present) ===
On 27 January 2026, Palát was traded to the New York Islanders, alongside a 2026 third-round pick and a 2027 sixth-round pick, in exchange for Maxim Tsyplakov. The next day, Palát would score a goal and an assist in his Islanders debut, a 5–2 win against the rival New York Rangers, before scoring 3 assists in his final 28 games to close out the campaign.

== International play ==
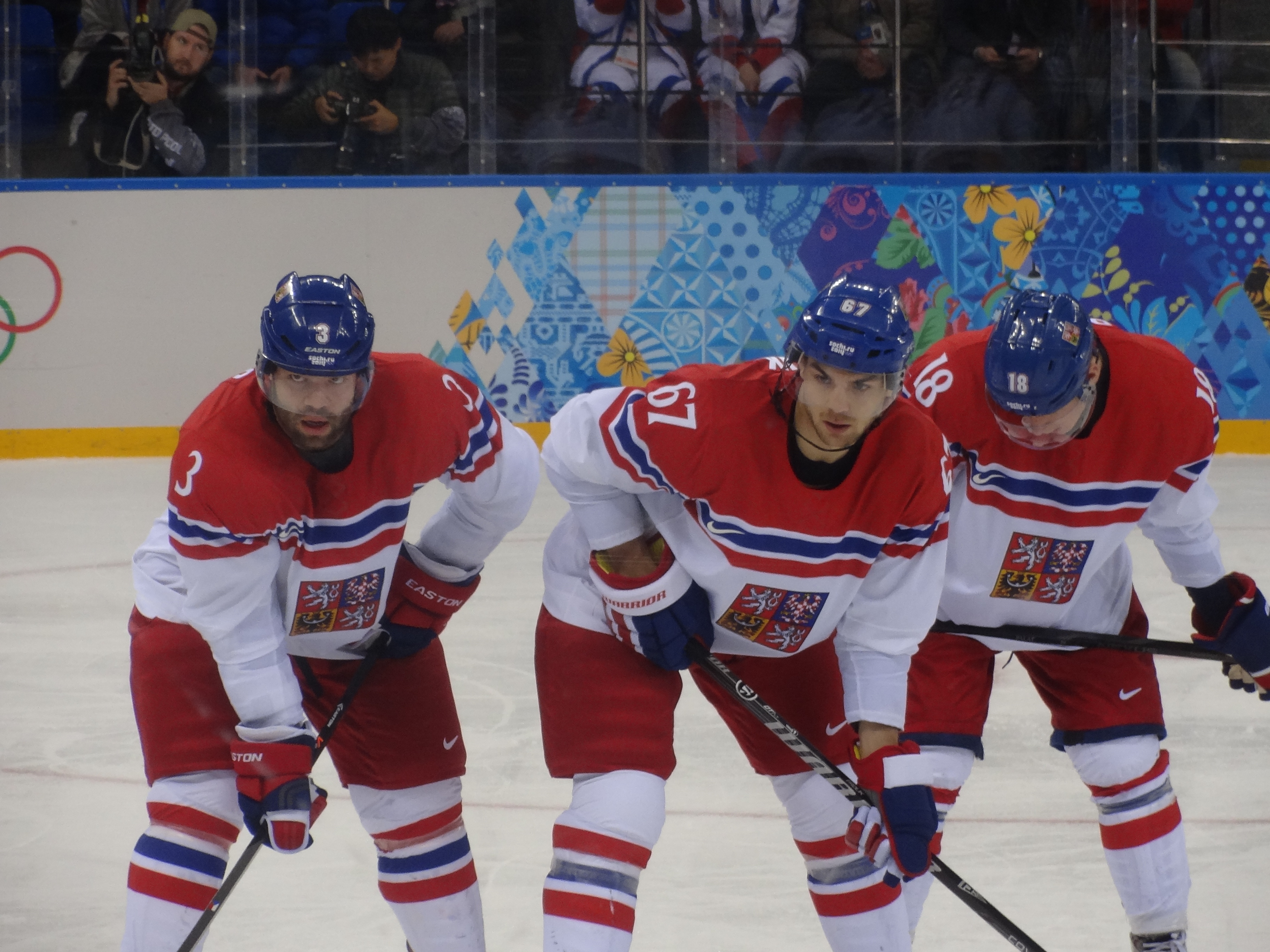
- Palát (right) in February 2014 alongside Michael Frolík and Radko Gudas with the Czech Republic team during the 2014 Winter Olympics.

Medal record

Men's ice hockey

Representing the Czech Republic

World Championships
Gold medal – first place	2024 Czech Republic	

On 6 January 2014, Palát was named to the Czech Republic senior team to compete at the 2014 Winter Olympics. He recorded no points through four games before the Czech Republic were eliminated by the United States. Two years later, Palát was able to represent his home country again on the international level at the 2016 World Cup of Hockey. While he recorded one assist through three games the Czechs were eliminated before the semifinal round.

Palát earned his first medal with the Czech Republic men's national ice hockey team at the 2024 World Championship. He recorded three goals and three assists through 10 games en route to Czech Republic's first gold medal since 2010.

== Career statistics ==
=== Regular season and playoffs ===
			Regular season					Playoffs
Season	Team	League	GP	G	A	Pts	PIM	GP	G	A	Pts	PIM
2005–06	HC Frýdek-Místek	CZE.2 U18	14	10	7	17	6	—	—	—	—	—
2005–06	HC Vítkovice Steel	CZE U18	22	2	7	9	4	1	0	0	0	0
2006–07	HC Frýdek-Místek	CZE.2 U18	7	7	11	18	6	—	—	—	—	—
2006–07	HC Vítkovice Steel	CZE U18	33	32	24	56	18	9	3	6	9	4
2006–07	HC Vítkovice Steel	CZE U20	13	5	2	7	12	3	0	0	0	0
2007–08	HC Frýdek-Místek	CZE.2 U18	3	13	4	17	0	—	—	—	—	—
2007–08	HC Vítkovice Steel	CZE U18	4	2	3	5	0	2	1	1	2	2
2007–08	HC Vítkovice Steel	CZE U20	42	19	18	37	28	2	1	0	1	2
2008–09	HC Vítkovice Steel	CZE U20	42	23	33	56	14	10	8	6	14	12
2009–10	Drummondville Voltigeurs	QMJHL	59	17	23	40	24	7	1	1	2	0
2010–11	Drummondville Voltigeurs	QMJHL	61	39	57	96	24	10	4	7	11	6
2011–12	Norfolk Admirals	AHL	61	9	21	30	10	18	4	5	9	6
2012–13	Syracuse Crunch	AHL	56	13	39	52	35	18	7	19	26	12
2012–13	Tampa Bay Lightning	NHL	14	2	2	4	0	—	—	—	—	—
2013–14	Tampa Bay Lightning	NHL	81	23	36	59	20	3	2	1	3	0
2014–15	Tampa Bay Lightning	NHL	75	16	47	63	24	26	8	8	16	12
2015–16	Tampa Bay Lightning	NHL	62	16	24	40	20	17	4	6	10	14
2016–17	Tampa Bay Lightning	NHL	75	17	35	52	39	—	—	—	—	—
2017–18	Tampa Bay Lightning	NHL	56	11	24	35	6	17	6	6	12	2
2018–19	Tampa Bay Lightning	NHL	64	8	26	34	20	4	1	0	1	2
2019–20	Tampa Bay Lightning	NHL	69	17	24	41	22	25	11	7	18	10
2020–21	Tampa Bay Lightning	NHL	55	15	31	46	26	23	5	8	13	10
2021–22	Tampa Bay Lightning	NHL	77	18	31	49	20	23	11	10	21	10
2022–23	New Jersey Devils	NHL	49	8	15	23	6	12	3	4	7	6
2023–24	New Jersey Devils	NHL	71	11	20	31	37	—	—	—	—	—
2024–25	New Jersey Devils	NHL	77	15	13	28	12	5	0	2	2	2
2025–26	New Jersey Devils	NHL	51	4	6	10	12	—	—	—	—	—
2025–26	New York Islanders	NHL	29	1	4	5	2	—	—	—	—	—
NHL totals			905	182	338	520	266	155	51	52	103	68

=== International ===
Year	Team	Event	Result	GP	G	A	Pts	PIM
2008	Czech Republic	U18 D1	11th	5	6	2	8	2
2008	Czech Republic	IH18	5th	—	1	—	—	—
2009	Czech Republic	U18 D1	6th	6	1	0	1	2
2011	Czech Republic	WJC	7th	6	2	1	3	0
2014	Czech Republic	OG	6th	4	0	0	0	0
2016	Czech Republic	WCH	6th	3	0	1	1	0
2019	Czech Republic	WC	4th	10	1	1	2	6
2024	Czechia	WC	1st place, gold medalist(s)	10	3	3	6	4
2026	Czechia	OG	8th	5	1	1	2	0
Junior totals				17	9	3	12	4
Senior totals				32	5	6	11	10

== Awards and honours ==
Award	Year	Ref
Czech Republic
Golden Hockey Stick	2022	
AHL
Calder Cup champion	2012	
NHL
NHL All-Rookie Team	2014	
Stanley Cup champion	2020, 2021	
