= Nikita Kucherov =

Russian ice hockey player (born 1993)

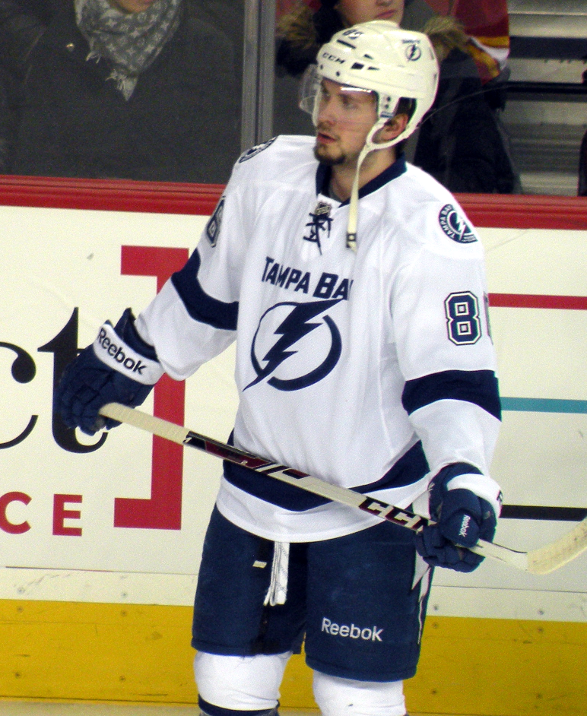
- Kucherov with the Tampa Bay Lightning in January 2014
- Born: 17 June 1993 (age 33) Maykop, Russia
- Height: 5 ft 11 in (180 cm)
- Weight: 180 lb (82 kg; 12 st 12 lb)
- Position: Right wing
- Shoots: Left
- NHL team Former teams: Tampa Bay Lightning; CSKA Moscow
- National team: Russia
- NHL draft: 58th overall, 2011; Tampa Bay Lightning
- Playing career: 2011–present

Nikita Igorevich Kucherov (Russian: Никита Игоревич Кучеров; born 17 June 1993) is a Russian professional ice hockey player who is a right winger and alternate captain for the Tampa Bay Lightning of the National Hockey League (NHL). Regarded as one of the best to ever play for the franchise, and one of the best players in the world, Kucherov is a two-time recipient of the Hart Memorial Trophy as the NHL's most valuable player in 2019 and 2026, and twice was voted the winner of the Ted Lindsay Award as players' choice for the best player in the NHL in 2019 and 2025. He has led the league in scoring three times, thus earning the Art Ross Trophy in 2019, 2024, and 2025, and was the runner-up for the Maurice "Rocket" Richard Trophy as the league's goal-scoring leader in 2017. Kucherov holds the record for most points by a Russian-born player in a single season (144).

Kucherov has won the Stanley Cup twice with the Lightning, in 2020 and 2021, leading the playoffs in scoring both times. He holds multiple Lightning records, holding the franchise record for all-time points scored, as well as franchise playoff records for most points, most goals, and most assists.

== Playing career ==
=== Junior ===
Kucherov played for Krasnaya Armiya of the Russian Junior Hockey League, the junior team of CSKA Moscow starting in the 2009–10. He spent three seasons with the team and made his professional debut in the Kontinental Hockey League (KHL) during this time, playing 27 KHL games over the 2010–11 and 2011–12 seasons. In the 2011 NHL entry draft, he was selected 58th overall by the Tampa Bay Lightning. In an attempt to transition to the North American style, Kucherov played major junior hockey with the Rouyn-Noranda Huskies of the Quebec Major Junior Hockey League (QMJHL). He signed a three-year entry-level contract with the Lightning on 10 September 2012 while playing in the QMJHL.

=== Tampa Bay Lightning (2013–present) ===
==== Early years, "The Triplets" era (2013–2015) ====
Kucherov made his NHL debut on 25 November 2013 against the New York Rangers. He scored a goal on his first shot, on his first shift, against Henrik Lundqvist; he was the seventh player in Lightning history to score a goal in his NHL debut. On 23 December 2013, Kucherov recorded his first NHL assist on a goal by J. T. Brown. His rookie season would end with Kucherov playing in 52 games with nine goals and nine assists for 18 points. Kucherov made his playoff debut in the opening game in the opening round of the 2014 playoffs against the Montreal Canadiens on 16 April 2014, where he would score his first career playoff goal on goaltender Carey Price.

During the 2014–15 season, Kucherov's sophomore NHL campaign, Kucherov had a breakout season and spent the bulk of the season playing on the second line with Tyler Johnson and Ondřej Palát (later dubbed as the "Triplets" line by Lightning head coach Jon Cooper and the media). On 28 October 2014, he recorded his first career hat trick in a game against the Arizona Coyotes. Kucherov played in all 82 games in the season, posting 29 goals, 36 assists and 65 points. Kucherov also tied for the NHL lead in plus-minus with Montreal Canadiens forward Max Pacioretty at a +38 rating. The +38 rating also set the Lightning single-season franchise record for +/- rating. On 18 April 2015, Kucherov recorded his first career playoff assist on a goal by Tyler Johnson in the second game of the opening round of the 2015 playoffs in a 5–1 win over the Detroit Red Wings. On 20 May, Kucherov joined Martin St. Louis as the only players in Lightning history to record two game-winning goals in overtime in a single playoff year, having scored a winner that evening in game three of the Eastern Conference finals against the Presidents' Trophy-winning New York Rangers on goaltender Henrik Lundqvist; he had scored one in game one of the prior round against the Montreal Canadiens on goaltender Carey Price. After defeating the Detroit Red Wings, Montreal Canadiens and New York Rangers in the first three rounds, Kucherov and the Triplets would prove to be one of the most dangerous lines in the NHL as Lightning clinched a spot in the 2015 Stanley Cup Final, in which they would lose to the Chicago Blackhawks in six games. Kucherov would finish the Lightning's lengthy playoff run with 10 goals and 12 assists for 22 points in all 26 contests played.

==== Rise to stardom, first Hart Trophy, back-to-back Stanley Cups (2015–2022) ====
On 26 March 2016, in a 7–4 win over the New York Islanders, Kucherov sustained a foot injury while blocking a shot, resulting in him missing the next two games. Kucherov led the team in points (66) and was second in assists (36) and goals (30), playing in 77 games during the 2015–16 season while playing most of the season on the first line with Alex Killorn and captain Steven Stamkos. Kucherov's thirty goals also set a new career-high in goals (30), power-play goals (nine) and game-winning goals (four). Kucherov also tied his top mark for assists in a season (36), ranked second on the team in shots (209) and power-play goals, while also leading the team with 19 multi-point games. He also skated in all 17 Stanley Cup playoff games with the Lightning last season in their run to the Eastern Conference finals where the Lightning would fall to the Pittsburgh Penguins in seven games, coming just one win short from a second straight appearance in the Stanley Cup Final, scoring 11 goals, eight assists and 19 points to go along with a +13 rating. He led the team during the 2016 playoffs in goals and points.

On 11 October 2016, the Lightning re-signed Kucherov to a three-year, $14.3 million contract. On 27 October, in a 3–1 loss to the Montreal Canadiens, Kucherov tumbled into the boards while handling the puck preparing to make a pass to linemate and captain Steven Stamkos with Canadiens' forward Torrey Mitchell in close pursuit, resulting in a shoulder injury that would sideline Kucherov for the next game two days later against the New Jersey Devils, which ended in another 3–1 loss before returning to the lineup the following game the following day against the New York Rangers, where the Lightning lost 6–1. On 29 December, Kucherov recorded his 100th assist on a goal by Ondřej Palát in a 3–2 loss to the Toronto Maple Leafs. On 10 January 2017, Kucherov was named to the 2017 NHL All-Star game as a member of the Atlantic Division team. On 21 February, Kucherov recorded his 200th career NHL point with an assist on a goal by Ondřej Palát. On 27 February, Kucherov recorded his second career hat-trick against the Ottawa Senators, which was the 10th natural hat-trick in Lightning history. It was also the first ever in team history to have all three goals scored during the power plays. On 18 March, Kucherov recorded his 100th career NHL goal in a 5–3 loss to the Washington Capitals on goaltender Braden Holtby. On 23 March, Kucherov also recorded his second hat trick in less than a month apart from his first in the 2016–17 season against the Boston Bruins. This also became his third hat trick in his NHL career. On 27 March, Kucherov had two assists on goals by Ondřej Palát and Jonathan Drouin in a 5–4 overtime win over the Chicago Blackhawks, setting a Lightning record for most points in a single month with 22. On 7 April, Kucherov scored his 40th goal of the season against Carey Price of the Montreal Canadiens, setting a new career high in goals. With his 40th goal, Kucherov joined Steven Stamkos, Vincent Lecavalier, Martin St. Louis, and Brian Bradley as the only players in Lightning history with 40-goal seasons. Additionally, Kucherov joined Alexander Ovechkin, Evgeni Malkin, Ilya Kovalchuk, Pavel Bure, and Alexander Mogilny as the only Russian-born players with a 40-goal season at age 23 or younger. Kucherov finished the 2016–17 season with 40 goals, 45 assists and 85 points in 74 contests played as the Lightning missed the 2017 playoffs by one point in the league standings, marking the first time in Kucherov's career where he missed the playoffs. His 40 goals led the team in goals and tied Toronto Maple Leafs rookie forward Auston Matthews as the runner-up to the Rocket Richard Trophy only behind the league-leading 45 goals by Pittsburgh Penguins captain Sidney Crosby. On 21 June, Kucherov was named an NHL second team All-Star for the 2016–17 season.

On 12 October 2017, Kucherov also became the first player in franchise history to record a goal in five consecutive games to start a season. On 16 October, Kucherov recorded two more goals, which extended the streak to six games. In doing so, Kucherov joined Mario Lemieux, Keith Tkachuk, and Steve Yzerman as the only players in the last 30 years to score a goal in each of their first six games. On the very next night, Kucherov extended his goal-scoring streak to seven games. In doing so, Kucherov became the sixth player in the modern era (since 1943−44) to score in each of their team's first seven games. Kucherov's goal scoring streak was ended the following game on 19 October in a 2–0 win over the Columbus Blue Jackets. On 26 October, Kucherov recorded a point in his 11th consecutive game to start the season (12 goals and seven assists for 19 points in the first 11 games). Linemate and captain Steven Stamkos also recorded a point for the 11th straight game (four goals and 17 assists for 21 points). In doing so, both Kucherov and Stamkos tied Martin St. Louis for the longest season-opening point streak in Lightning history. Kucherov's streak was ended the following game on 28 October with no points recorded against 4–1 loss to the Anaheim Ducks. On 10 January 2018, Kucherov was named to the 2018 NHL All-Star Game, which was played at Amalie Arena in Tampa, Florida. On 8 February, Kucherov recorded a three-point night in a 5–2 Lightning victory over the visiting Vancouver Canucks. Kucherov finished the 2017–18 season playing 80 contests and lead the team in goals, assists and points with 39 goals, 61 assists and 100 points recorded to mark his first career 100-point season. His 100 points ranked third in the NHL overall only behind the 102 from Philadelphia Flyers forward and captain Claude Giroux and the league-leading 108 points from Edmonton Oilers forward and captain Connor McDavid, respectively. On 22 April, Kucherov recorded a goal in a 3–1 Lightning series-clinching over the New Jersey Devils in the first round of the 2018 playoffs. The goal was his 10th point of the series, which established a new franchise record for most points in a single series. After defeating the Devils in the opening round in five games, Kucherov and the Lightning would eventually defeat the Boston Bruins in the second round in five games before losing in the Eastern Conference finals in seven games to the eventual Stanley Cup champion Washington Capitals, one win short from reaching the Stanley Cup Final once more. Kucherov ended the playoffs with seven goals, 10 assists and 17 points in all 17 games played

On 10 July 2018, Kucherov signed an eight-year, $76 million contract extension with the Lightning. On 15 November, Kucherov recorded his 200th assist on a goal scored by Brayden Point in a 4–3 win over the Pittsburgh Penguins. In December 2018, Kucherov set the franchise record for most assists (21) and points (30) in a single calendar month. On 2 January 2019, Kucherov was named to the 2019 National Hockey League All-Star Game. This was Kucherov's third consecutive selection to the All-Star Game. On 18 February, Kucherov recorded a five-point night in a 5–1 Lightning win over the Columbus Blue Jackets at Nationwide Arena. Three of his five points came as assists, which gave Kucherov the Lightning single-season record for assists (70), breaking the mark of 68, by Brad Richards and Martin St. Louis. On 9 March, Kucherov set the Lightning single season record for points in a season with his 109th point. The point came in a 3–2 Lightning win over the Detroit Red Wings at Amalie Arena. On 14 March, Kucherov recorded his 80th assist of the season on a Brayden Point goal in a 5–4 win over the Detroit Red Wings, becoming the first player since Henrik Sedin in 2009–10 to hit the mark. On 20 March, Kucherov recorded two power-play goals against Washington Capitals goaltender Braden Holtby to give him the most power-play points by a Lightning player in a single season (47). Kucherov scored his 40th goal of the season for his 126th point on Toronto Maple Leafs goaltender Frederik Andersen on 5 April, setting the record for most points in an NHL season during the salary cap era (since 2005–06), a record previously held by Joe Thornton, who recorded 96 assists in 2005–06 and 92 in 2006–07, respectively. After the 2018–19 season, the Lightning won the Presidents' Trophy as the regular season champions and Kucherov had amassed 128 points (41 goals and 87 assists) in all 82 games played, surpassing Alexander Mogilny for most points in a season by a Russian-born player. Kucherov's 87 assists also tied Jaromír Jágr for the most assists in a single NHL season by a wing. Having amassed the most points for the regular season Kucherov was awarded the Art Ross Trophy. On 12 April, following the Lightning's game one loss in the first round of the 2019 playoffs against the Columbus Blue Jackets, Kucherov was suspended one game for boarding Markus Nutivaara during the team's game two loss. After missing game three due to the suspension, Kucherov returned to the Lightning lineup for game four where the Blue Jackets defeated the Lightning 7–3 to complete the four-game sweep. On 19 June, Kucherov was awarded the Hart Memorial Trophy, voted by hockey writers and the Ted Lindsay Award, voted by the players, as the most valuable player at the 2019 NHL awards for 2018–19.

On 21 December 2019, Kucherov scored his 200th goal on goaltender Braden Holtby in a 3–1 loss to the Washington Capitals. On 23 December, Kucherov recorded his 300th assist and 500th point on a goal by Brayden Point in a 6–1 victory over the Florida Panthers. On 6 February 2020, Kucherov played his 500th NHL game in a 4–2 win over the Pittsburgh Penguins. On 19 August, Kucherov recorded three assists in a Lightning first-round series-clinching win over the Columbus Blue Jackets on goals by Anthony Cirelli, Kevin Shattenkirk and Brayden Point, respectively. The three assists moved Kucherov past Martin St. Louis for the most points (70) in Lightning playoff history. On 26 August, Kucherov recorded his first career four-point playoff game in a 7–1 Lightning victory over the Presidents' Trophy-winning Boston Bruins in the third game of their second-round series. On 8 September, Kucherov recorded a goal and four assists for a five-point night in an 8–2 Lightning win over the New York Islanders in the first game of the Eastern Conference finals. Kucherov's five-point game established a new franchise record for points in a single playoff game. Kucherov's 4 assists set a new franchise record for most assists in a single playoff season (16). Kucherov's goal in that game moved him past St. Louis for the most goals in Lightning playoff history (34). On 21 September, Kucherov recorded two assists in game two of the 2020 Stanley Cup Final. The two points moved Kucherov past Brad Richards for the most points in a single playoff season in franchise history. That same day Kucherov was named as a Second Team All-Star for the 2019–20 season. Kucherov eventually won the Stanley Cup on 28 September after the Lightning defeated the Dallas Stars in six games. He led the league in points (34) and assists (27) in the 2020 playoffs. Kucherov and Brayden Point also became the first teammates to have 30 playoff points (34 and 33 respectively) since Sidney Crosby and Evgeni Malkin (31 and 37 respectively) in 2009.

On 23 December 2020, it was announced that Kucherov would undergo hip surgery and would miss the entirety of the pandemic-shortened 2020–21 season. After missing all 56 regular season games, he returned for the 2021 playoffs, playing in all 23 games, and leading the league in playoff scoring with 32 points (eight goals, 24 assists), as the Lightning repeated as Stanley Cup champions. Kucherov also led his team in playoff assists (24) and shots on goal (62). After game five of the 2021 Stanley Cup Final on 7 July 2021, in which the Lightning defeated the Montreal Canadiens to clinch the series 4–1, Kucherov appeared at the podium drunk and shirtless to answer reporters' questions, during which time he expressed his elation at the Lightning's defence of the Stanley Cup and praised the performance of the Lightning goaltender Andrei Vasilevskiy. During the conference, Kucherov also coined the term "number one bullshit" about Vasilevskiy losing the Vezina Trophy as the league's top goaltender that season to Vegas Golden Knights goaltender Marc-André Fleury and to Winnipeg Jets goaltender Connor Hellebuyck the year prior. At the ensuing Stanley Cup parade on 12 July, Kucherov and several Lightning players wore shirts depicting Kucherov during his interview next to his famous "number one bullshit" quote.

On 16 October 2021 in a 2–1 overtime win over the Washington Capitals, Kucherov suffered a groin injury and missed 32 games before returning to the lineup on 6 January 2022, in a 4–1 win over the Calgary Flames and scoring his 4th career hat trick in that game. He finished the 2021–22 season playing in 47 games with 25 goals, 44 assists and 69 points. On 15 June, in game one of the 2022 Stanley Cup Final against the Colorado Avalanche, Kucherov recorded his 100th playoff assist on a goal by Ondřej Palát. The Lightning would go on to lose the finals in six games. Kucherov ended the 2022 playoffs with eight goals and 19 assists for 27 points in all 23 games, with his 27 points finishing first on the Lightning and fourth in the league in points.

==== Second Hart Trophy, 100-assist season, early playoff exits, and trade request (2022–present) ====
Kucherov was named alternate captain for the 2022–23 season after Ryan McDonagh was traded in the 2022 off-season. On 13 December 2022, Kucherov recorded his 400th assist on a goal scored by Erik Černák in a 6–2 win over the Seattle Kraken. Kucherov finished the 2022–23 season with 30 goals, 83 assists and 113 points in all 82 games played. He also recorded a goal and five assists for six points in all six games as the Lightning played the Toronto Maple Leafs in the first round for the second straight year, this time losing in six games.

On 27 December 2023, Kucherov scored his 300th NHL goal on goaltender Sergei Bobrovsky in a 3–2 loss to the Florida Panthers. On 18 January 2024, Kucherov recorded his 500th NHL assist on a Steven Stamkos goal in a 7–3 victory over the Minnesota Wild. On 23 January, Kucherov recorded his fifth career hat-trick in a 6–3 win over the Philadelphia Flyers. On 17 April, Kucherov recorded his 100th assist of the 2023–24 season on a Brayden Point goal in the game of the season in a 6–4 win against the Toronto Maple Leafs, becoming the first winger, second in the 2023–24 season (besides Edmonton Oilers forward and captain Connor McDavid) and fifth overall player in NHL history (besides Connor McDavid, Wayne Gretzky, Mario Lemieux and Bobby Orr), with 100 assists in a single season. Kucherov ended the season with a career high in goals (44), assists (100), and points (144) in 81 games played. His 144 points earned him his second career Art Ross Trophy. Kucherov was unanimously named to the 2023–24 NHL first All-Star team at right wing, becoming the first unanimous All-Star team selection since Jarome Iginla in 2002. In the Lightning's first round exit in five games to the eventual Stanley Cup champion Florida Panthers, Kucherov was held goalless in all five games but recorded seven assists for seven points for the 2024 playoffs. Kucherov was named a finalist for the Hart Memorial Trophy and Ted Lindsay Award for the second time in his career, both eventually going to Colorado Avalanche forward Nathan MacKinnon.

On 18 January 2025, Kucherov recorded his 600th career assist on a goal by Darren Raddysh in a 5–1 win over the Detroit Red Wings, becoming the second Lightning player in franchise history to do so. Kucherov ended the 2024–25 season with 37 goals and 84 assists for 121 points in 78 games played. His 84 assists tied Colorado Avalanche forward Nathan MacKinnon as the league leader in assists and his 121 points would earn Kucherov his second consecutive Art Ross Trophy and third overall, making him the ninth player in NHL history to earn the award at least three times. In the 2025 playoffs, Kucherov and the Lightning once again were defeated by the defending Stanley Cup champion and eventual back-to-back champion Florida Panthers in the first round in five games. Kucherov played in all five games and was again held goalless but recorded four assists for four points. He was also for a third time a finalist for both the Hart Memorial Trophy and the Ted Lindsay Award, winning the Ted Lindsay Award for the second time but ceding the Hart Trophy to Connor Hellebuyck of the Presidents' Trophy-winning Winnipeg Jets.

Kucherov recorded his 1,000th NHL point on 25 October 2025, with an assist on a goal by Jake Guentzel in a 4–3 win over the Anaheim Ducks, becoming the 101st player to reach the mark. On 25 February 2026, Kucherov recorded his 700th career assist on a goal by Gage Goncalves in a 4–2 victory over the Toronto Maple Leafs. Kucherov ended the season with 130 points (44 goals and 86 assists) in 76 games. He was named a finalist for the Ted Lindsay Award for the third consecutive year and fourth time overall, and received his second Hart Memorial Trophy while the Ted Lindsay Award went to Edmonton Oilers forward and captain Connor McDavid. The Lightning faced the Montreal Canadiens in the first round of the 2026 playoffs, and Kucherov scored his first postseason goal in over three years on April 21. However, his play overall in the closely contested series was criticized, and for the seventh time in his career he did not record a point in a playoff Game 7, with the Lightning being eliminated in the first round for the fourth consecutive year.

On 24 October 2026, during an away game against the Utah Mammoth, Kucherov recorded his 1,138th career point with an assist on a goal by Brayden Point, surpassing Steven Stamkos to become the all-time Lightning franchise points leader. The record had stood for just over four years by this point. Less than a week later, on 30 October, it was confirmed Kucherov had told the team he would not re-sign and would subsequently request a trade. Later that same day, Julien BriseBois, the general manager of the Lightning, stated that the team had "no intention of trading Nikita." Kucherov stated on 2 November, that the trade request was not about money, but "was more about poor communication and respect."

== International play ==
Medal record

Men's ice hockey

Representing Russia

World Championships
Bronze medal – third place	2017 Germany/France	
Bronze medal – third place	2019 Slovakia	

World Junior Championships
Silver medal – second place	2012 Canada	
Bronze medal – third place	2013 Ufa	

World U18 Championships
Bronze medal – third place	2011 Germany	

Kucherov played in several international tournaments with the Russian national junior team, including the 2012 and 2013 World Junior Championships, where Russia won a silver and then bronze medal.

In 2016 Kucherov made his debut for the Russian national team, joining Lightning teammates Nikita Nesterov, Vladislav Namestnikov, and Andrei Vasilevskiy at the 2016 World Cup of Hockey.

Kucherov, along with Vasilevskiy and Namestnikov played at the 2017 World Championship, where Russia won a bronze medal. He returned for the 2019 World Championship, again winning a bronze medal.

== Personal life ==
Kucherov was born in Maykop in southern Russia but moved with his family to Moscow at a young age. His mother took up a job at a hockey rink, which is how Kucherov first started to play.

Kucherov has a wife, Anastasiya, and a son.

Kucherov's father, Igor, is a Colonel in the Russian Army.

== Career statistics ==
=== Regular season and playoffs ===
Bold indicates led league

			Regular season					Playoffs
Season	Team	League	GP	G	A	Pts	PIM	GP	G	A	Pts	PIM
2009–10	Krasnaya Armiya	MHL	53	29	25	54	40	5	0	2	2	2
2010–11	Krasnaya Armiya	MHL	47	27	31	58	81	10	5	8	13	16
2010–11	CSKA Moscow	KHL	9	0	2	2	0	—	—	—	—	—
2011–12	Krasnaya Armiya	MHL	23	24	19	43	40	7	3	1	4	0
2011–12	CSKA Moscow	KHL	18	1	4	5	4	—	—	—	—	—
2012–13	Quebec Remparts	QMJHL	6	3	7	10	2	—	—	—	—	—
2012–13	Rouyn-Noranda Huskies	QMJHL	27	26	27	53	12	14	9	15	24	10
2013–14	Syracuse Crunch	AHL	17	13	11	24	10	—	—	—	—	—
2013–14	Tampa Bay Lightning	NHL	52	9	9	18	14	2	1	0	1	0
2014–15	Tampa Bay Lightning	NHL	82	29	36	65	37	26	10	12	22	14
2015–16	Tampa Bay Lightning	NHL	77	30	36	66	30	17	11	8	19	8
2016–17	Tampa Bay Lightning	NHL	74	40	45	85	38	—	—	—	—	—
2017–18	Tampa Bay Lightning	NHL	80	39	61	100	42	17	7	10	17	10
2018–19	Tampa Bay Lightning	NHL	82	41	**87**	**128**	62	3	0	2	2	19
2019–20	Tampa Bay Lightning	NHL	68	33	52	85	38	25	7	**27**	**34**	22
2020–21	Tampa Bay Lightning	NHL	—	—	—	—	—	23	8	**24**	**32**	14
2021–22	Tampa Bay Lightning	NHL	47	25	44	69	22	23	8	19	27	14
2022–23	Tampa Bay Lightning	NHL	82	30	83	113	36	6	1	5	6	11
2023–24	Tampa Bay Lightning	NHL	81	44	**100**	**144**	22	5	0	7	7	2
2024–25	Tampa Bay Lightning	NHL	78	37	**84**	**121**	45	5	0	4	4	2
2025–26	Tampa Bay Lightning	NHL	76	44	86	130	50	7	1	5	6	10
KHL totals			27	1	6	7	4	—	—	—	—	—
NHL totals			879	401	723	1,124	436	159	54	123	177	126

=== International ===
Year	Team	Event	GP	G	A	Pts	PIM
2010	Russia	IH18	4	1	1	2	2
2011	Russia	U18	7	11	10	21	6
2012	Russia	WJC	7	2	5	7	2
2013	Russia	WJC	7	5	3	8	4
2016	Russia	WCH	4	2	1	3	0
2017	Russia	WC	10	7	8	15	8
2019	Russia	WC	10	6	10	16	4
Junior totals			25	19	19	38	14
Senior totals			24	15	19	34	12

== Awards and honours ==
Award	Year	Ref
MHL
All-Star Game	2011	
NHL
NHL All-Star Game	2017, 2018, 2019, 2023, 2024	
NHL first All-Star team	2018, 2019, 2024, 2025, 2026	
NHL second All-Star team	2017, 2020	
NHL Quarter-Century Tampa Bay Lightning First Team	2025	
Art Ross Trophy	2019, 2024, 2025	
Ted Lindsay Award	2019, 2025	
Hart Memorial Trophy	2019, 2026	
Stanley Cup champion	2020, 2021	
International
World U18 Championship First Team All-Star	2011	
Kharlamov Trophy	2019	

== Records ==
=== NHL records ===
- Most assists in a single season by a winger in NHL history – 100 (2023–24)
- Most points in a single season by a Russian-born player – 144 (2023–24)

=== Tampa Bay Lightning records ===
- Most playoff points – 167
- Most playoff goals – 53
- Most playoff assists – 114
- Most points in a single season – 144 (2023–24)
- Most assists in a single season – 100 (2023–24)
- Most points in a single playoff season – 34 (2019–20)
- Most assists in a single playoff season – 27 (2019–20)
- Most assists in a single calendar month by a Tampa Bay Lightning player – 22 (2025–26)
- Most consecutive games with a point to start a season by a Tampa Bay Lightning player – 11 (2017–18)
- Most consecutive games with a goal to start a season by a Tampa Bay Lightning player – 7 (2017–18)

=== Career, regular season ===
- Most points by a Tampa Bay Lightning player in franchise history, 1,138

Awards and achievements
Preceded by Connor McDavid; Connor McDavid	Art Ross Trophy winner 2019; 2024, 2025	Succeeded by Leon Draisaitl; Connor McDavid
Preceded by Connor McDavid; Nathan MacKinnon	Ted Lindsay Award winner 2019; 2025	Succeeded by Leon Draisaitl; Connor McDavid
Preceded by Taylor Hall; Connor Hellebuyck	Hart Memorial Trophy winner 2019; 2026	Succeeded by Leon Draisaitl; Incumbent
