= Kurtis MacDermid =

Canadian ice hockey player (born 1994)

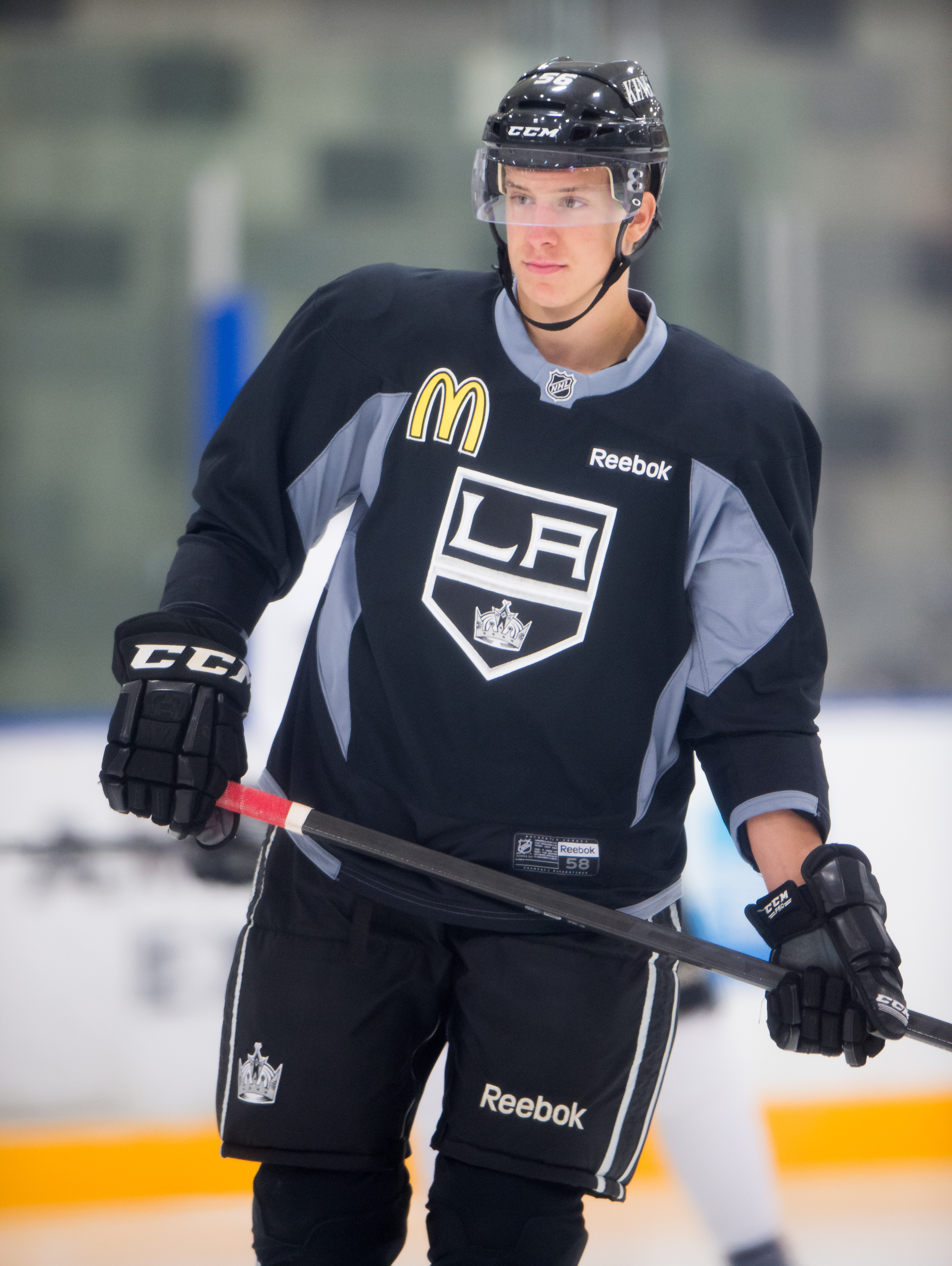
- MacDermid with the Los Angeles Kings in 2013
- Born: March 25, 1994 (age 32) Quebec City, Quebec, Canada
- Height: 6 ft 5 in (196 cm)
- Weight: 239 lb (108 kg; 17 st 1 lb)
- Position: Forward
- Shoots: Left
- NHL team (P) Cur. team Former teams: Ottawa Senators; Belleville Senators (AHL); Los Angeles Kings; Colorado Avalanche; New Jersey Devils
- NHL draft: Undrafted
- Playing career: 2015–present

Kurtis MacDermid (born March 25, 1994) is a Canadian professional ice hockey player who is a forward for the Belleville Senators of the American Hockey League while under contract to the Ottawa Senators of the National Hockey League (NHL). He previously played for the Los Angeles Kings, Colorado Avalanche, and New Jersey Devils. MacDermid won the Stanley Cup with the Colorado Avalanche in 2022. He is mostly known as an enforcer.

== Playing career ==
=== Amateur ===
MacDermid first played junior hockey with the Owen Sound Greys in the Greater Ontario Junior Hockey League. He was selected in seventh round, 139th overall, as a defenceman by the Owen Sound Attack of the Ontario Hockey League (OHL) in the 2010 OHL Priority Draft. He made his debut with the Attack in the 2011–12 season, in which he appeared in nine games, recording two assists for two points. He played his first full season in 2012–13 season, playing in 65 games, scoring one goal and seven assists for eight points. The Attack made the playoffs and advanced to the conference semifinals where they were eliminated by the Plymouth Whalers. In 12 playoff games, MacDermid added three assists.

He began the 2013–14 season with Owen Sound, making 38 appearances, scoring five goals and 16 points. On January 9, 2014, he was traded to the Erie Otters in exchange for draft picks. He finished the season in Erie, scoring two goals and three points as the team qualified for the playoffs. The team advanced to the conference finals where they were knocked out of contention by the Guelph Storm. He returned to Erie for the 2014–15 season and in 61 games, he tallied eight goals and 40 points. The Otters made the playoffs and advanced to the championship final where they were defeated by the Oshawa Generals. In 12 playoff games he marked five assists.

=== Professional ===
==== Los Angeles Kings ====
After going undrafted by National Hockey League (NHL) teams in the NHL entry draft, MacDermid signed as a free agent to a three-year, entry-level contract with the Los Angeles Kings on September 13, 2012. He made his professional debut with the Kings' American Hockey League (AHL) affiliate, the Ontario Reign, in the 2015–16 season. He received a 12-game suspension from the AHL on December 29, 2015, for an illegal check to the head of San Diego Gulls forward Matt Bailey. In 56 games, he recorded four goals and 16 points. Ontario finished atop the Pacific Division and in the playoffs, made the semifinals where they were defeated by the eventual champions, the Lake Erie Monsters. In 13 playoff games, MacDermid scored two goals and three points. In his second season with the Reign in 2016–17 season, he put up six goals and 20 points. The Reign finished third in the division and made the playoffs again but were eliminated in the first round by the San Diego Gulls. In five playoff games, he went scoreless.

After two seasons as a regular on the blue line with the Reign and having made positive progress at the conclusion of his rookie contract, MacDermid was re-signed to a one-year, two-way contract extension on July 14, 2017. After competing in training camp and pre-season, MacDermid made the opening night roster with the Kings for the 2017–18 season. He made his NHL debut with Los Angeles on opening night in a 2–0 victory over the Philadelphia Flyers on October 5. He scored his first NHL goal in a 4–0 win over the Montreal Canadiens on October 26. MacDermid was sent down to the AHL on January 16, 2018. In 34 games with the Kings, he tallied one goal and four points. He spent the rest of the season with the Reign, making 32 appearances and marking one goal and five points as the Reign finished third again in the division. The Reign made the playoffs but were knocked out in the first round for the second consecutive season, this time by the Texas Stars. In four playoff games, he went scoreless.

On July 15, 2018, it was announced that MacDermid had signed a two-year, two-way contract with Los Angeles. He was assigned to Ontario to start the 2018–19 season. He spent the majority of the season in the AHL, playing 48 games and scoring five goals and 15 points. He was recalled by Los Angeles on February 27, 2019. Regarded as the Kings' "meanest fighter", he made 11 appearances with the Kings, recording one assist. For the 2019–20 season, MacDermid began with the Kings. On January 3, 2020, MacDermid was suspended by the NHL for two games for an illegal check. However, the season was cut short by the COVID-19 pandemic when the league stopped all play on March 12. MacDermid marked three goals and eight points in 45 games. As a result of their record before the season was suspended, the Kings failed to make the playoffs. In the pandemic-shortened 2020–21 season MacDermid recorded two goals and four points in 28 games. For the second consecutive year, the team failed to make the playoffs.

==== Seattle Kraken and Colorado Avalanche ====
On July 21, 2021, MacDermid was selected from the Kings at the 2021 NHL expansion draft by the Seattle Kraken. On July 27, the Kraken then traded him to the Colorado Avalanche in exchange for a fourth round pick in 2023. He made his Avalanche debut on October 16, replacing Jack Johnson in the lineup, in a 5–3 loss to the St. Louis Blues. He tallied his first point for Colorado on December 8, assisting on Logan O'Connor's second period goal in a 7–3 victory over the New York Rangers. He marked his first goal with Colorado on January 26, 2022, in a 4–3 win over the Boston Bruins. In his first season with the Avalanche he set a new career high in games played with 58. He scored two goals and five points. The Avalanche advanced to the 2022 Stanley Cup Final and beat the Tampa Bay Lightning to win the franchise's third Stanley Cup. MacDermid did not play in any of the team's playoff games. He signed a two-year contract extension with the Avalanche on April 5.

He returned to Colorado for the 2022–23 season as the team's enforcer and saw time as a forward. As a role player, he saw limited ice time in an injury-plagued season. On November 13, he suffered a lower body injury in a game against the Carolina Hurricanes that kept him out of the lineup until December 20. In March 2023, he played in only one of the team's eleven games after suffering another lower body injury and a concussion. He appeared in 44 games, scoring one goal and six points. The defending champions made the playoffs again and faced the Seattle Kraken in the opening round. In a surprise upset, the Kraken knocked off the Avalanche. MacDermid did not appear in any of the team's playoff games. He began the 2023–24 season with the Avalanche and made 29 appearances, scoring two goals.

==== New Jersey Devils ====
On March 1, 2024, MacDermid was traded by Colorado to the New Jersey Devils in exchange for signing rights to Zakhar Bardakov and a 2024 seventh-round pick. He made his Devils' debut on March 3 against his former team, the Los Angeles Kings. He tallied his only point with the Devils on March 14 assisting on Chris Tierney's first period goal in a 6–2 win over the Dallas Stars. He finished the season appearing in 16 games with the Devils, recording just the one point. The Devils missed the playoffs. As a pending unrestricted free agent, MacDermid opted to remain with the Devils, re-signing to a three-year, $3.45 million contract extension on May 17. With his new contract signed, he returned to New Jersey for the 2024–25 season. However, he saw his playing time reduced and only played in 23 games, going scoreless. The Devils made the playoffs, but were eliminated in the first round by the Carolina Hurricanes. MacDermid did not appear in any of the team's playoff games.

==== Ottawa Senators ====
On October 3, 2025, ahead of the 2025–26 season, MacDermid was traded to the Ottawa Senators in exchange for forward Zack MacEwen. He made his debut in the team's season opening 5–4 win over the Tampa Bay Lightning. He recorded his first point with the team when he assisted on Nick Cousins' goal in a 3–2 victory over the Winnipeg Jets on December 15. He made 19 appearances with the Senators, registering the one assist. The Senators made the playoffs again, but were swept in the first round by the Carolina Hurricanes. MacDermid did not play in any of the Senators' playoff games. He began the 2025–26 season on the injured list. After being activated he was placed on waivers by the Senators on October 24, 2026 and after going unclaimed, was assigned to Ottawa's AHL affiliate, the Belleville Senators.

== Personal life ==
MacDermid is the son of former NHL player Paul MacDermid and was born in Quebec City during his father's stint with the Quebec Nordiques, but was raised in Sauble Beach, Ontario. His older brother, Lane, also played in the NHL with the Boston Bruins, Dallas Stars, and Calgary Flames.

== Career statistics ==
			Regular season					Playoffs
Season	Team	League	GP	G	A	Pts	PIM	GP	G	A	Pts	PIM
2010–11	Owen Sound Greys	GOJHL	51	6	16	22	124	—	—	—	—	—
2011–12	Owen Sound Greys	GOJHL	20	3	6	9	80	—	—	—	—	—
2011–12	Owen Sound Attack	OHL	9	0	2	2	7	—	—	—	—	—
2012–13	Owen Sound Attack	OHL	65	1	7	8	110	12	0	3	3	11
2013–14	Owen Sound Attack	OHL	38	5	11	16	90	—	—	—	—	—
2013–14	Erie Otters	OHL	28	2	1	3	75	12	0	3	3	29
2014–15	Erie Otters	OHL	61	8	32	40	129	12	0	5	5	23
2015–16	Ontario Reign	AHL	56	4	12	16	121	13	2	1	3	12
2016–17	Ontario Reign	AHL	58	6	14	20	135	5	0	0	0	4
2017–18	Los Angeles Kings	NHL	34	1	3	4	57	—	—	—	—	—
2017–18	Ontario Reign	AHL	32	1	5	6	78	4	0	0	0	0
2018–19	Ontario Reign	AHL	48	5	10	15	147	—	—	—	—	—
2018–19	Los Angeles Kings	NHL	11	0	1	1	11	—	—	—	—	—
2019–20	Los Angeles Kings	NHL	45	3	5	8	47	—	—	—	—	—
2020–21	Los Angeles Kings	NHL	28	2	2	4	36	—	—	—	—	—
2021–22	Colorado Avalanche	NHL	58	2	3	5	89	—	—	—	—	—
2022–23	Colorado Avalanche	NHL	44	1	5	6	55	—	—	—	—	—
2023–24	Colorado Avalanche	NHL	29	2	0	2	23	—	—	—	—	—
2023–24	New Jersey Devils	NHL	16	0	1	1	50	—	—	—	—	—
2024–25	New Jersey Devils	NHL	23	0	0	0	23	—	—	—	—	—
2025–26	Ottawa Senators	NHL	19	0	1	1	33	—	—	—	—	—
NHL totals			307	11	21	32	424	—	—	—	—	—

== Awards and honours ==
Award	Year	Ref
NHL
Stanley Cup champion	2022	

== Bibliography ==
- Chaimovitch, Jason, ed. (2025). 2025–2026 American Hockey League Official Guide & Record Book. Springfield, Massachusetts: American Hockey League. OCLC 22147888.
