= Josh Manson =

Canadian-American ice hockey player (born 1991)

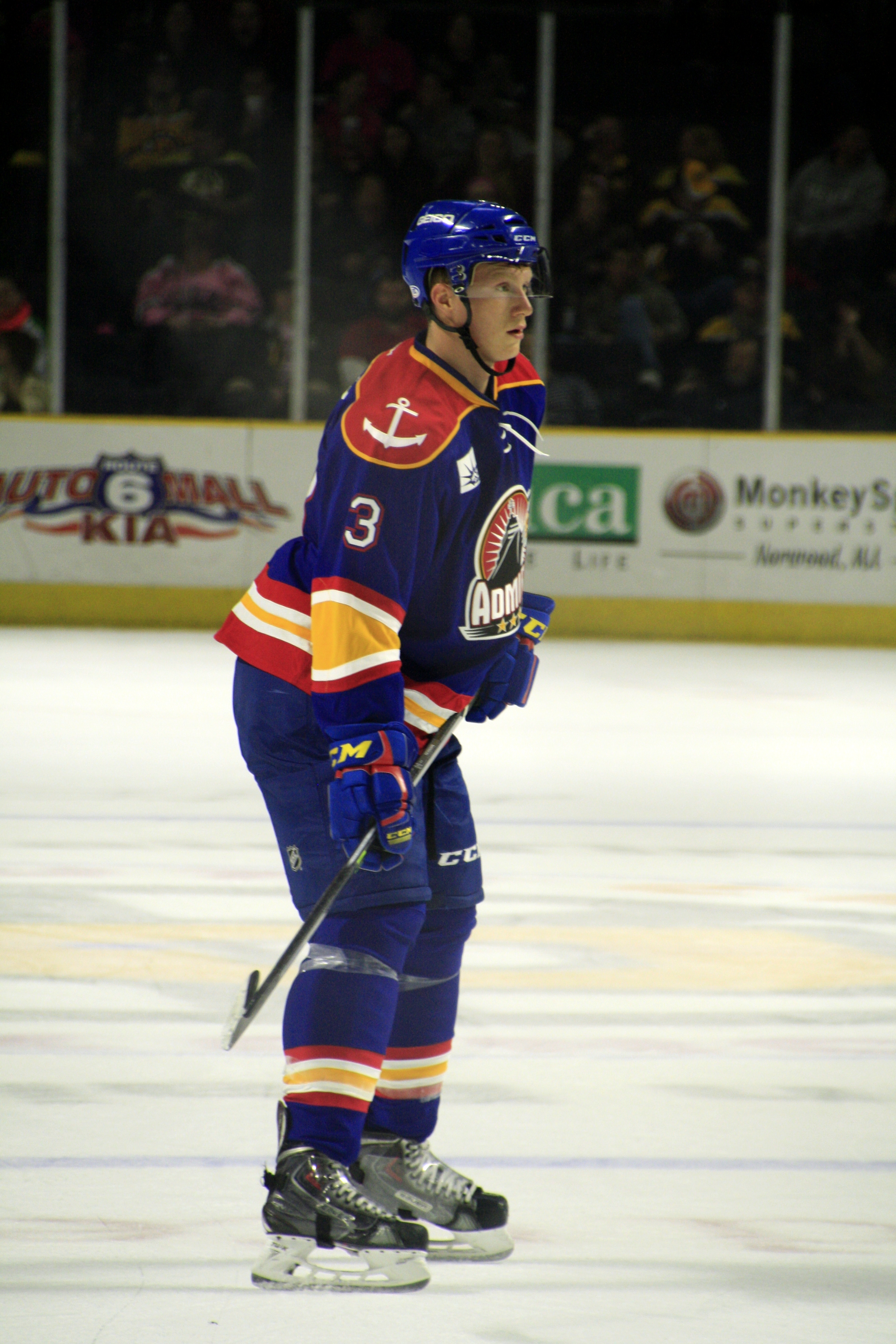
- Manson with the Norfolk Admirals in 2014
- Born: October 7, 1991 (age 34) Hinsdale, Illinois, U.S.
- Height: 6 ft 3 in (191 cm)
- Weight: 215 lb (98 kg; 15 st 5 lb)
- Position: Defence
- Shoots: Right
- NHL team Former teams: Colorado Avalanche; Anaheim Ducks
- NHL draft: 160th overall, 2011; Anaheim Ducks
- Playing career: 2014–present

Joshua David Manson (born October 7, 1991) is a Canadian–American professional ice hockey player who is a defenceman for the Colorado Avalanche of the National Hockey League (NHL). Manson was selected by the Anaheim Ducks in the sixth round, 160th overall, of the 2011 NHL entry draft. He is the son of former longtime NHL defenceman Dave Manson. Manson won the Stanley Cup with the Avalanche in 2022.

Manson played three seasons of NCAA Division I hockey with Northeastern University, where he was rewarded when he was selected as HE Best Defensive Defenseman and was named to the 2013–14 Hockey East Second All-Star Team.

== Playing career ==
=== Junior ===
Manson moved to Prince Albert, Saskatchewan following the end of his father's playing career. Manson wasn't initially interested in ice hockey and was debating whether to try out for the midget team. During the 2008-09 season, Manson committed to play for the Salmon Arm Silverbacks of the British Columbia Hockey League (BCHL).

Manson became a defenceman during his second season with the Silverbacks, following injuries to the lineup and elected to develop himself in the position.

Manson recorded 12 goals and 35 assists in 57 games with the Silverbacks, which earned him consideration to be selected in the 2011 NHL entry draft. Prior to the 2011 NHL entry draft, Manson accepted a scholarship to play NCAA Division I ice hockey for Quinnipiac University for the 2012–13 season. Manson was drafted in the sixth round, by the Anaheim Ducks. Following his selection, Manson opted to transfer from Quinnipiac to Northeastern University.

=== Collegiate ===
Manson joined the Northeastern Huskies men's ice hockey team for their 2011–12 season, where he played in 22 games and recorded four points. The following season, Manson recorded his first collegiate goal in overtime against the University of Massachusetts-Amherst. During his junior season, Manson was named team captain. He was selected as HE Best Defensive Defenseman and was named to the 2013–14 Hockey East Second All-Star Team.

=== Professional ===
==== Anaheim Ducks ====
On March 25, 2014, forgoing his final year of collegiate eligibility, Manson signed a two-year, entry-level contract with the Anaheim Ducks. He began the season with the Norfolk Admirals in the American Hockey League (AHL) before being recalled to the NHL level due to various injuries. After Mark Fistric suffered an upper-body injury during a game against the St. Louis Blues he subsequently made his NHL debut on October 31, 2014, against the Dallas Stars. During the game, he registered one hit in 12:30 of ice time and played on the teams' penalty kill. Manson split his time between the Admirals and Ducks during the season, playing 28 games with Anaheim and 36 games in the AHL.

After attending the Ducks' training camp, Manson was named to their opening night roster prior to the 2015–16 season but was shortly thereafter placed on their injured reserve due to an unspecified upper-body injury. Following a game against the Toronto Maple Leafs on March 24, Manson was fined $2,487 for making an inappropriate throat-slashing gesture towards Nazem Kadri. As the Ducks made the 2016 Stanley Cup playoffs, Manson played in game one of the First Round against the Nashville Predators but was knocked out of the game following a hit from Filip Forsberg. As a result of the hit, Manson did not play for the remainder of the series.

The following season, Manson scored his first career NHL goal on November 6 during a home game against the Columbus Blue Jackets. He scored at 8:46 of the third period to help the Ducks win 4–2. He appeared in 71 games and recorded 15 points while playing alongside Hampus Lindholm. During the Ducks' playoff berth, Manson was praised for his physical play during their series against the Edmonton Oilers and Nashville Predators. In game seven against the Oilers, Manson set a new franchise playoff hit record with 11 within 20:38 of ice time in the 2–1 win.

On October 4, 2017, Manson signed a four-year contract extension with the Ducks through the 2021–22 NHL season. In the first year of his new contract, Manson set career highs in goals, assists, and points. He continued to play alongside Lindholm and they combined for a 53.53 Corsi-For percentage at even strength.

After attending the Ducks' training camp, Manson was named to their opening night roster prior to the 2019–20 season. However, in late October Manson suffered an MCL sprain during a game against the Dallas Stars and was expected to be out of the lineup for 5–10 weeks.

In the following pandemic shortened 2020–21 season, on January 21, 2021, it was announced that Manson would be out nearly six weeks with an oblique muscle injury sustained against the Minnesota Wild. He was limited to just 23 regular season games, posting 7 points, as the Ducks missed the post-season for the third consecutive year.

In his seventh season with the Ducks in 2021–22, Manson as the veteran and alternate captain on the blueline for the rebuilding Ducks, contributed with 4 goals and 9 points through 45 games.

==== Colorado Avalanche ====
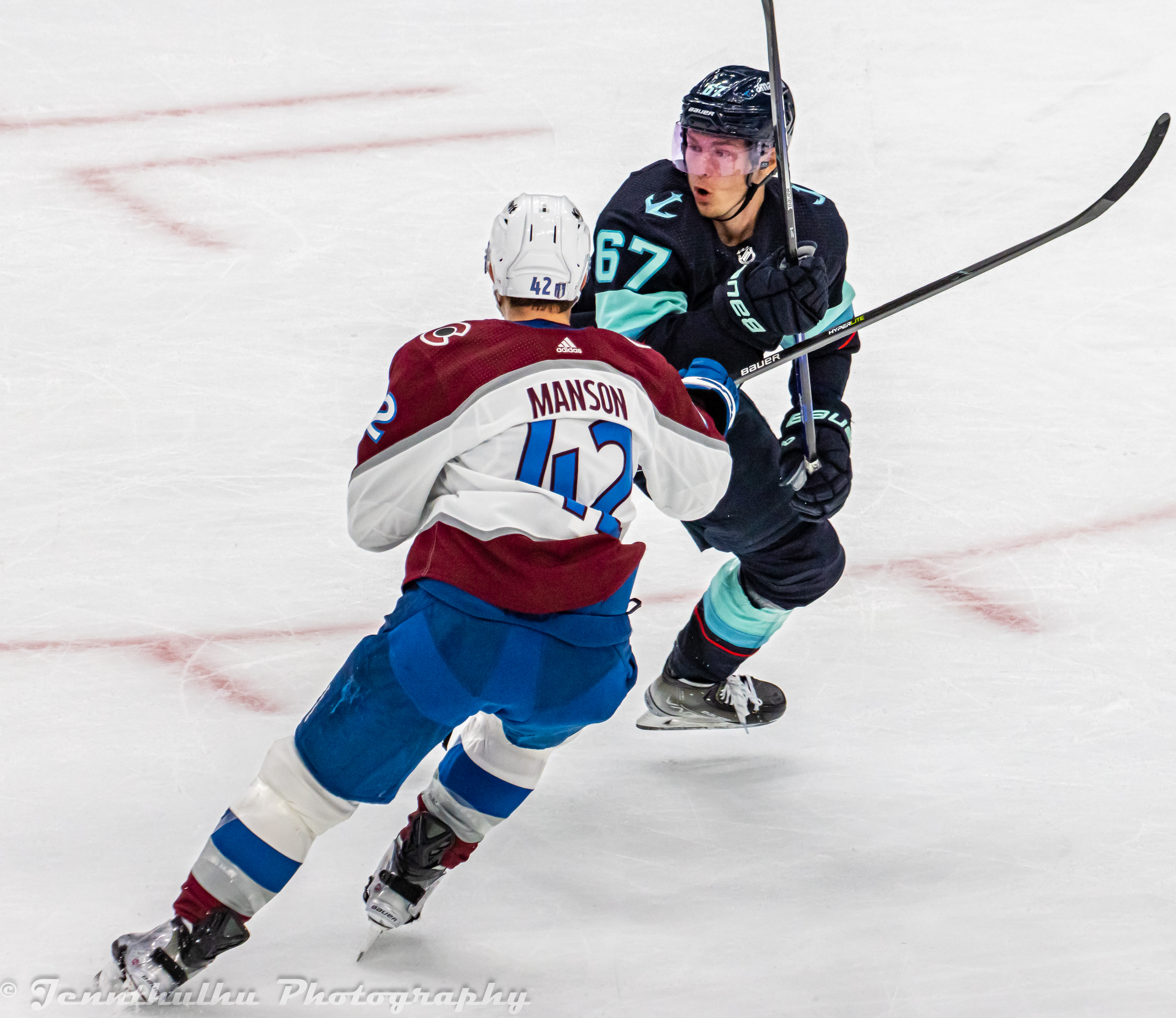
Manson during the 2023 Stanley Cup playoffs.

While in the final season of his four-year contract and with the Ducks trending out of playoff contention, Manson was traded to the Colorado Avalanche, in exchange for Drew Helleson and a 2023 second-round draft pick on March 14, 2022. He ended his tenure with Anaheim, placing fifth all-time among franchise defenceman in games played with 453. He made his debut with the Avalanche against the Los Angeles Kings, demonstrating his physical presence to register a game high 10 hits, in a 3–0 victory on March 15, 2022. On May 17, 2022, Manson scored his first career playoff goal, an overtime winner against the St. Louis Blues.

Manson had the first two-goal game of his NHL career in an 8–2 home win over the Ottawa Senators on 8 January 2026. He achieved the Gordie Howe hat trick in the same match as he also collected a pair of assists and fought Tyler Kleven in the first period. His father Dave was in attendance.

== Personal life ==
Manson was born in the Chicago area suburb of Hinsdale, Illinois, when his father Dave played for the Chicago Blackhawks. Five days before his birth, his father was traded to the Edmonton Oilers.

Manson is the oldest of four siblings and comes from a family of strong athletic lineage. His sister Meagan previously played soccer for the University of Saskatchewan, while his brother Ben previously played for the La Ronge Ice Wolves of the Saskatchewan Junior Hockey League. Manson is the cousin of current DEL defenceman Dylan Yeo.

Manson and his wife, Julie, have two daughters together. Manson is a Christian.

== Career statistics ==
			Regular season					Playoffs
Season	Team	League	GP	G	A	Pts	PIM	GP	G	A	Pts	PIM
2007–08	Prince Albert Mintos	SMHL	42	4	6	10	73	8	2	0	2	0
2008–09	Prince Albert Mintos	SMHL	40	19	16	35	64	3	1	0	1	4
2008–09	Flin Flon Bombers	SJHL	2	0	0	0	0	—	—	—	—	—
2009–10	Salmon Arm Silverbacks	BCHL	54	10	14	24	75	6	1	0	1	15
2010–11	Salmon Arm Silverbacks	BCHL	57	12	35	47	80	14	2	7	9	15
2011–12	Northeastern University	HE	33	0	4	4	48	—	—	—	—	—
2012–13	Northeastern University	HE	33	3	4	7	45	—	—	—	—	—
2013–14	Northeastern University	HE	33	3	7	10	65	—	—	—	—	—
2013–14	Norfolk Admirals	AHL	9	1	0	1	26	10	1	0	1	6
2014–15	Norfolk Admirals	AHL	36	3	9	12	47	—	—	—	—	—
2014–15	Anaheim Ducks	NHL	28	0	3	3	31	—	—	—	—	—
2015–16	Anaheim Ducks	NHL	71	5	10	15	74	1	0	0	0	0
2016–17	Anaheim Ducks	NHL	82	5	12	17	82	17	0	3	3	20
2017–18	Anaheim Ducks	NHL	80	7	30	37	62	4	0	0	0	0
2018–19	Anaheim Ducks	NHL	74	3	13	16	62	—	—	—	—	—
2019–20	Anaheim Ducks	NHL	50	1	8	9	37	—	—	—	—	—
2020–21	Anaheim Ducks	NHL	23	1	6	7	30	—	—	—	—	—
2021–22	Anaheim Ducks	NHL	45	4	5	9	53	—	—	—	—	—
2021–22	Colorado Avalanche	NHL	22	2	5	7	12	20	3	5	8	12
2022–23	Colorado Avalanche	NHL	27	2	8	10	42	5	0	0	0	8
2023–24	Colorado Avalanche	NHL	76	8	17	25	87	11	2	5	7	12
2024–25	Colorado Avalanche	NHL	48	1	14	15	28	7	2	1	3	8
2025–26	Colorado Avalanche	NHL	79	5	26	31	91	9	0	3	3	10
NHL totals			705	44	157	201	691	74	7	17	24	70

== Awards and honours ==
Award	Year	Ref
College
Hockey East Second All-Star Team	2013–14	
HE Best Defensive Defenseman	2013–14	
Hockey East All-Academic Team	2013–14	
NHL
Stanley Cup champion	2022	

Awards and achievements
Preceded by Patrick Wey	Hockey East Best Defensive Defenseman; 2013–14	Succeeded by Mike Paliotta
