= 2022 Stanley Cup Final =

2022 ice hockey championship series

| | 1 | 2 | 3 | 4 | 5 | 6 | Total |
|---|---|---|---|---|---|---|---|
| Tampa Bay Lightning | 3* | 0 | 6 | 2* | 3 | 1 | 2 |
| Colorado Avalanche | 4* | 7 | 2 | 3* | 2 | 2 | 4 |
- * – Denotes overtime period(s)
- Location(s): Tampa: Amalie Arena (3, 4, 6); Denver: Ball Arena (1, 2, 5)
- Coaches: Tampa Bay: Jon Cooper; Colorado: Jared Bednar
- Captains: Tampa Bay: Steven Stamkos; Colorado: Gabriel Landeskog
- National anthems: Tampa Bay: Sonya Bryson-Kirksey; Colorado: Amanda Hawkins
- Referees: Gord Dwyer (1, 3, 6); Jean Hebert (2, 5); Wes McCauley (2, 4); Chris Rooney (3, 5); Kelly Sutherland (1, 4, 6)
- Dates: June 15–26, 2022
- MVP: Cale Makar (Avalanche)
- Series-winning goal: Artturi Lehkonen (12:28, second)
- Networks: Canada: (English): CBC/Sportsnet/Sportsnet Now (French): TVA Sports; United States: (English): ABC/ESPN+
- Announcers: (CBC/SN) Chris Cuthbert and Craig Simpson (TVA) Felix Seguin, Alexandre R. Picard (1, 2) and Patrick Lalime (3–6) (ABC) Sean McDonough and Ray Ferraro (NHL International) Marc Moser (1), E. J. Hradek (2–6) and Kevin Weekes

The 2022 Stanley Cup Final was the championship series of the National Hockey League's (NHL) 2021–22 season and the culmination of the 2022 Stanley Cup playoffs. The series was between the Eastern Conference and two-time defending Stanley Cup champion Tampa Bay Lightning and the Western Conference champion Colorado Avalanche. The Avalanche defeated the Lightning four games to two in the best-of-seven series, earning their third Stanley Cup championship in franchise history and first since 2001. Colorado had home-ice advantage with the better regular-season record.

The series began on June 15, and concluded on June 26. With the Government of Canada allowing cross-border travel for fully vaccinated players and team personnel between Canada and the United States, the league was able to return to its usual two conference alignment and reinstate its standard playoff format that was used from 2014–2019, before the COVID-19 pandemic. The Final series were still pushed from the usual start date in late May/early June for the third consecutive year, this time due to a scheduled break in the regular season that coincided with the league's planned participation in the 2022 Winter Olympics, though the league's players ultimately did not participate in the Olympics. When NHL Commissioner Gary Bettman tested positive for COVID-19, NHL Deputy Commissioner Bill Daly took over the presentation of the Conn Smythe Trophy and the Stanley Cup. This was the first time since 1992 that Gary Bettman did not give the presentation.

== Paths to the Final ==
=== Tampa Bay Lightning ===
This was Tampa Bay's third consecutive Final appearance and fifth overall. They won the prior two Stanley Cups (2020, 2021) and have won three in franchise history. They were the first team to clinch three consecutive Final appearances since the Edmonton Oilers between 1983 and 1985. The Lightning joined the Montreal Canadiens (1976–1980) and New York Islanders (1980–1984) for becoming the only teams in league history to post at least eleven consecutive playoff series victories.

Captain Steven Stamkos led the team in scoring with 106 points during the regular season. Defenceman Victor Hedman scored 85 points, eclipsing the previous Tampa Bay record for defencemen, which Hedman set in 2017. During the off-season, the Lightning signed goaltender Brian Elliott, defenceman Zach Bogosian, and forwards Pierre-Edouard Bellemare and Corey Perry via free agency. They also opted to re-sign forwards Brayden Point and Ross Colton and defenceman Cal Foote with Patrick Maroon re-signing during the season. At the trade deadline, the Lightning acquired forwards Brandon Hagel and Nick Paul. For Corey Perry, this was his third straight Final appearance with three different teams (Dallas Stars in 2020, Montreal Canadiens in 2021), the first player to accomplish this feat since Marian Hossa did it with the Pittsburgh Penguins in 2008, Detroit Red Wings in 2009, and Chicago Blackhawks in 2010.

The Lightning finished third in the Atlantic Division gaining 110 points with a 51–23–8 record. Tampa Bay defeated the Toronto Maple Leafs in the first round in seven games, followed by a four-game sweep of their intrastate rival, the Presidents' Trophy-winning Florida Panthers, during the second round, and then triumphed over the New York Rangers in the Eastern Conference final in six games.

=== Colorado Avalanche ===
This was Colorado's third appearance in the Final. They won their two prior appearances with their most recent against the New Jersey Devils in 2001.

Mikko Rantanen led the team in points, scoring 92 overall. Goaltender Darcy Kuemper started 57 times for the Avalanche, obtaining 37 wins in the process. However, during Game 1 of their Conference Final series, Kuemper left the game with an upper-body injury. Backup goaltender Pavel Francouz finished the opening game after replacing Kuemper and started the remaining games of the series as a result. During the off-season, the Avalanche traded for Kuemper and defenceman Kurtis MacDermid. They also picked up free agent Darren Helm. They re-signed defenceman Cale Makar, captain Gabriel Landeskog, and Francouz. Nearing the trade deadline, the Avalanche acquired Josh Manson, Nico Sturm, Artturi Lehkonen, and Andrew Cogliano.

The Avalanche finished the season with 119 points via a 56–19–7 record, grabbing the Central Division title and first place in the Western Conference. Colorado swept the Nashville Predators in four games during the first round, then defeated the St. Louis Blues in six games during the second round, before sweeping the Edmonton Oilers in the Western Conference final.

== Game summaries ==
Note: The numbers in parentheses represent each player's total goals or assists to that point of the entire playoffs.

=== Game one ===
| June 15 | Tampa Bay Lightning | 3–4 | OT | Colorado Avalanche | Ball Arena | Recap |

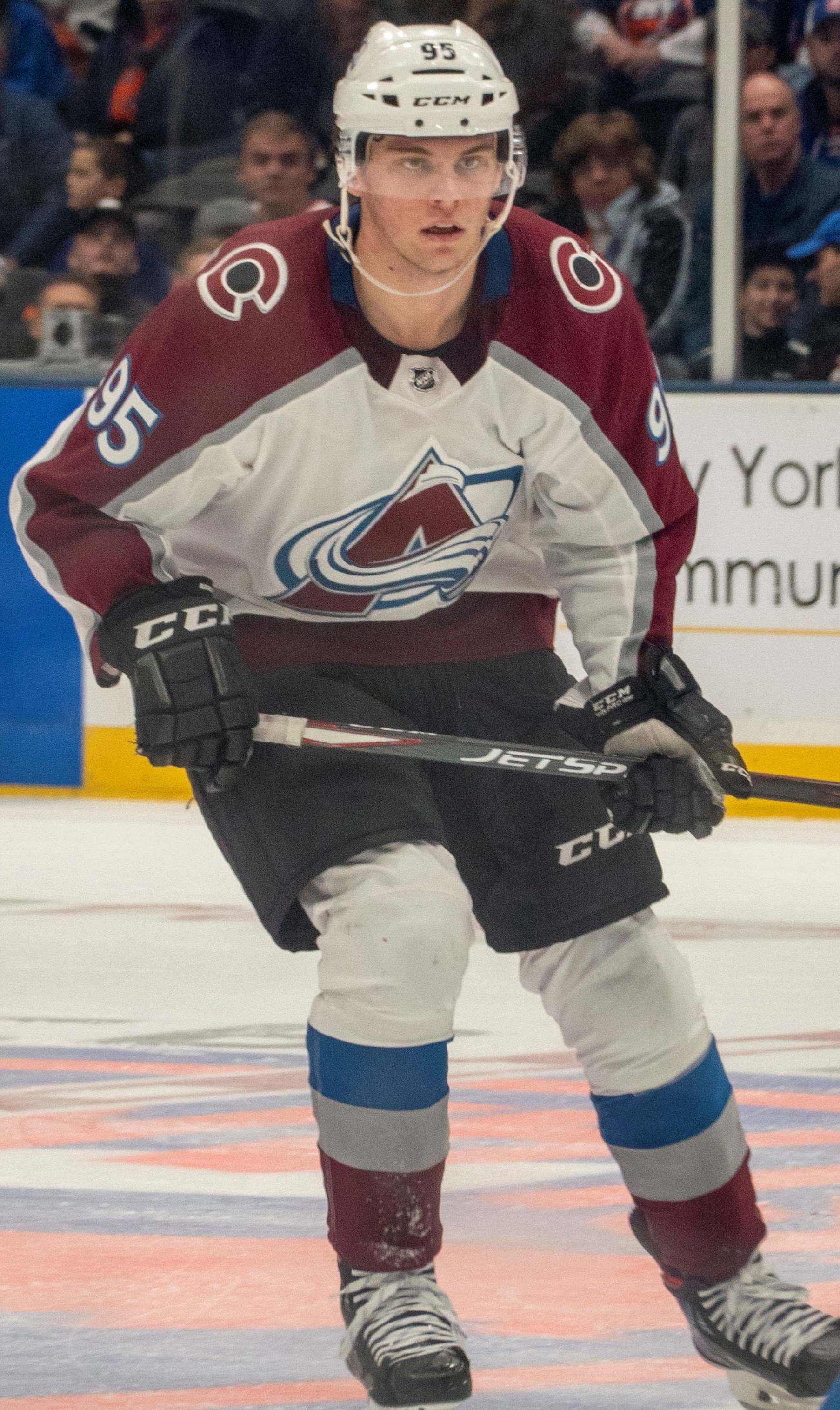
Andre Burakovsky scored the overtime-winning goal in game one.

In game one, the Avalanche controlled the first period scoring three times compared to the Lightning's one goal. Colorado's captain Gabriel Landeskog began the scoring, pushing the puck past Lightning goalie Andrei Vasilevskiy when Mikko Rantanen's shot barely squeaked under the goaltender's pads. The next goal came when defenceman Victor Hedman's clearing attempt got picked by Nathan MacKinnon, whose pass to Valeri Nichushkin made it 2–0. The Lightning halved Colorado's lead when Brayden Point's dump-in was retrieved by Nick Paul who broke in and dangled out Avalanche goaltender Darcy Kuemper to make 2–1. The Avalanche regained the two-goal lead five minutes later when Tampa was in a 5-on-3 penalty kill. MacKinnon's shot got blocked and on the rebound he passed back to Landeskog who set up Rantanen for a wrist shot that got tipped in by Artturi Lehkonen. In the second period, the Lightning got two goals to tie the game. Ondrej Palat scored the first goal as he and Nikita Kucherov entered the zone with the latter going inside-out on Devon Toews to set up Palat for the tip-in. 48 seconds later, the Lightning continuing their offensive zone attack had a pass back to Mikhail Sergachev from Brandon Hagel whose shot through traffic went off the post and into the net. The third period did not have any scoring albeit the Avalanche firing 12 shots compared to the Lightning's 5 shots, thus the game went into overtime. In overtime, as the Lightning attempted to clear the zone, J. T. Compher picked up the loose puck and shot it, but it was blocked by a Lightning defenceman. The puck then came to Nichushkin who passed to Andre Burakovsky and he fired a snap shot past Vasilevskiy to give Colorado a 4–3 victory.

Scoring summary
| Period | Team | Goal | Assist(s) | Time | Score |
|---|---|---|---|---|---|
| 1st | COL | Gabriel Landeskog (9) | Mikko Rantanen (13), Bowen Byram (8) | 07:47 | 1–0 COL |
| 1st | COL | Valeri Nichushkin (6) | Nathan MacKinnon (8) | 09:23 | 2–0 COL |
| 1st | TBL | Nick Paul (4) | Victor Hedman (13), Brayden Point (3) | 12:26 | 2–1 COL |
| 1st | COL | Artturi Lehkonen (7) – pp | Mikko Rantanen (14), Gabriel Landeskog (10) | 17:31 | 3–1 COL |
| 2nd | TBL | Ondrej Palat (9) | Nikita Kucherov (17), Ryan McDonagh (4) | 12:51 | 3–2 COL |
| 2nd | TBL | Mikhail Sergachev (2) | Brandon Hagel (4), Anthony Cirelli (5) | 13:39 | 3–3 |
| 3rd | None | | | | |
| OT | COL | Andre Burakovsky (2) | Valeri Nichushkin (5), J. T. Compher (3) | 01:23 | 4–3 COL |
Penalty summary
| Period | Team | Player | Penalty | Time | PIM |
| 1st | COL | Josh Manson | Holding the stick | 05:07 | 2:00 |
| 1st | TBL | Mikhail Sergachev | Tripping | 15:53 | 2:00 |
| 1st | TBL | Anthony Cirelli | Tripping | 16:20 | 2:00 |
| 2nd | TBL | Patrick Maroon | Roughing | 03:41 | 2:00 |
| 2nd | COL | Jack Johnson | Roughing | 03:41 | 2:00 |
| 2nd | COL | Bench (served by Alex Newhook) | Too many men on the ice | 06:28 | 2:00 |
| 3rd | COL | Logan O'Connor | Tripping | 05:48 | 2:00 |
| 3rd | TBL | Patrick Maroon | Delay of game (puck over glass) | 18:36 | 2:00 |
| OT | None | | | | |

Shots by period
| Team | 1 | 2 | 3 | OT | Total |
|---|---|---|---|---|---|
| TBL | 8 | 9 | 5 | 1 | 23 |
| COL | 15 | 10 | 12 | 1 | 38 |

=== Game two ===
| June 18 | Tampa Bay Lightning | 0–7 | Colorado Avalanche | Ball Arena | Recap |

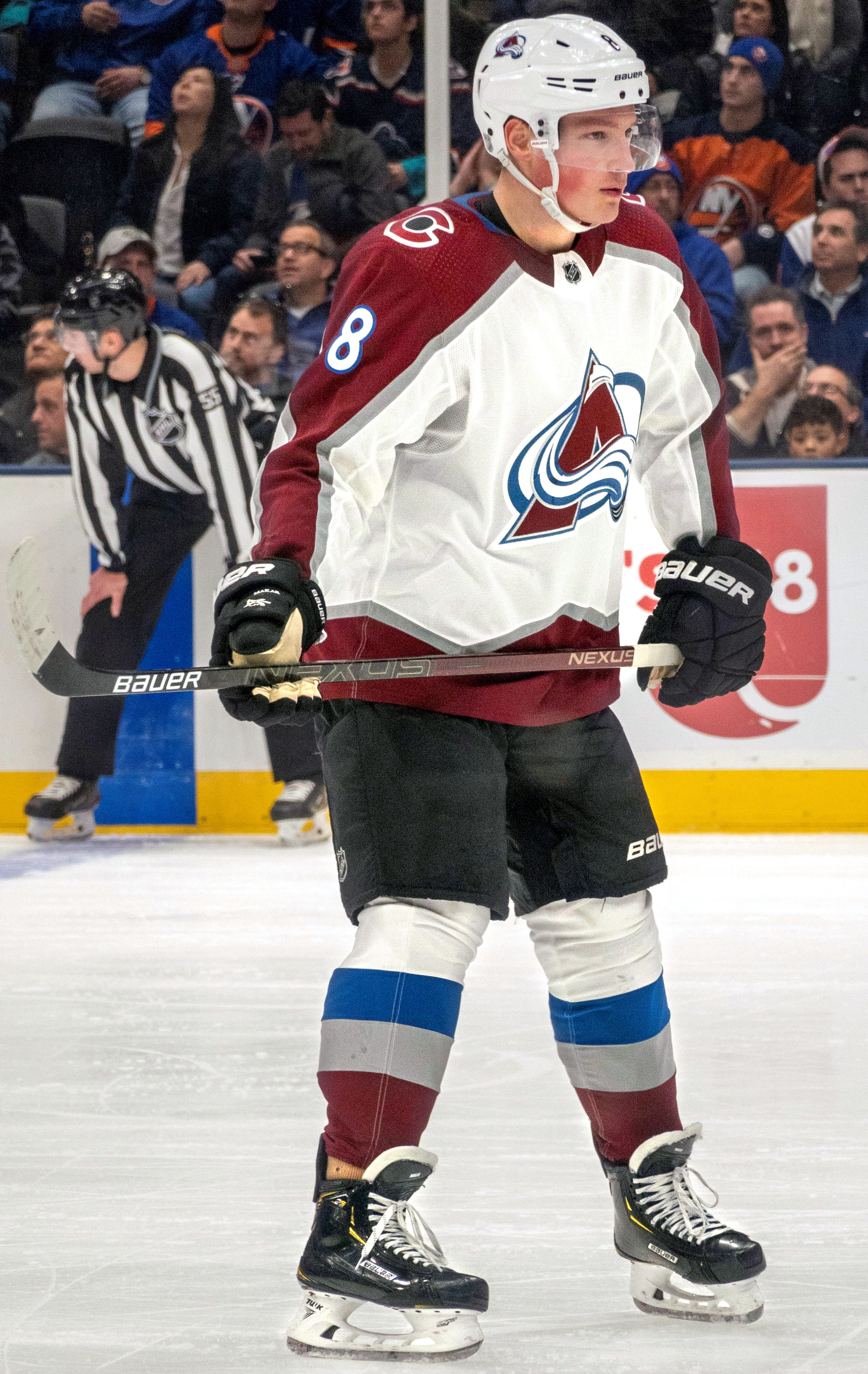
Cale Makar scored a power-play goal and short-handed goal in game two.

The Avalanche routed the Lightning in game two. In the first period, after Lightning defenceman Ryan McDonagh got penalized for roughing J. T. Compher, a power-play ensued for Colorado. During it, Andre Burakovsky led a cross-ice pass to Valeri Nichushkin's tip-in goal to give the Avalanche an early 1–0 lead. The Avalanche then grabbed a 2–0 lead when a 2-on-1 rush with Andrew Cogliano and Josh Manson led to the latter's wrist shot under Andrei Vasilevskiy's blocker. Burakovsky then made it 3–0 when the Avalanche on an offensive zone rush had Mikko Rantanen's shot rebound to Burakovsky for the quick tip-in. Burakovsky almost made it 4–0 when he was given a breakaway thanks to Rantanen's lead pass. In the second period, the Avalanche continued their offensive zone coverage allowing Rantanen to centre a pass to Nichushkin to make it 4–0. The Avalanche then made it 5–0 when the Lightning misplayed a pass leading Darren Helm and Logan O'Connor on a 2-on-1 break for which the former's wrist shot went over Vasilevskiy's glove. O'Connor was also given a breakaway chance to make it 6–0, but the Lightning goaltender stopped that. In the third period, as Rantanen was in the penalty box for tripping, the Lightning gave the puck away to Cale Makar who, with Andrew Cogliano on another 2-on-1, made it 6–0. Ondrej Palat then got called for cross checking and on the ensuing power-play, Nathan MacKinnon made a pass to Rantanen, who quickly passed to Makar for his second goal of the evening to make 7–0. With frustrations boiling over for Tampa Bay, four of their players were called for roughing for which Colorado retaliated with their own roughing calls. However, the Avalanche claimed a 7–0 victory with Darcy Kuemper stopping the 16 shots he faced to record his first shutout of the postseason.

Scoring summary
| Period | Team | Goal | Assist(s) | Time | Score |
|---|---|---|---|---|---|
| 1st | COL | Valeri Nichushkin (7) – pp | Andre Burakovsky (5), Alex Newhook (3) | 02:54 | 1–0 COL |
| 1st | COL | Josh Manson (3) | Andrew Cogliano (2), Alex Newhook (4) | 07:55 | 2–0 COL |
| 1st | COL | Andre Burakovsky (3) | Mikko Rantanen (15), Devon Toews (9) | 13:52 | 3–0 COL |
| 2nd | COL | Valeri Nichushkin (8) | Mikko Rantanen (16) | 04:51 | 4–0 COL |
| 2nd | COL | Darren Helm (2) | Logan O'Connor (3) | 16:26 | 5–0 COL |
| 3rd | COL | Cale Makar (6) – sh | Andrew Cogliano (3) | 02:04 | 6–0 COL |
| 3rd | COL | Cale Makar (7) – pp | Mikko Rantanen (17), Nathan MacKinnon (9) | 09:49 | 7–0 COL |
Penalty summary
| Period | Team | Player | Penalty | Time | PIM |
| 1st | TBL | Ryan McDonagh | Roughing | 01:01 | 2:00 |
| 1st | TBL | Mikhail Sergachev | Delay of game (puck over glass) | 08:34 | 2:00 |
| 1st | TBL | Corey Perry | Roughing | 16:12 | 2:00 |
| 1st | COL | Darcy Kuemper (served by Alex Newhook) | Holding the stick | 16:12 | 2:00 |
| 2nd | COL | Jack Johnson | Hooking | 05:35 | 2:00 |
| 2nd | TBL | Corey Perry (served by Patrick Maroon) | Roughing | 17:42 | 2:00 |
| 2nd | TBL | Corey Perry | Unsportsmanlike conduct | 17:42 | 2:00 |
| 2nd | COL | J. T. Compher | Hooking | 17:42 | 2:00 |
| 3rd | COL | Mikko Rantanen | Tripping | 01:04 | 2:00 |
| 3rd | TBL | Ondrej Palat | Cross-checking | 08:19 | 2:00 |
| 3rd | COL | Valeri Nichushkin | Roughing – double minor | 15:38 | 4:00 |
| 3rd | COL | Artturi Lehkonen | Roughing – double minor | 15:38 | 4:00 |
| 3rd | COL | Darren Helm | Roughing – double minor | 15:38 | 4:00 |
| 3rd | TBL | Anthony Cirelli | Roughing – double minor | 15:38 | 4:00 |
| 3rd | TBL | Steven Stamkos | Roughing – double minor | 15:38 | 4:00 |
| 3rd | TBL | Erik Cernak | Roughing – double minor | 15:38 | 4:00 |
| 3rd | TBL | Alex Killorn | Roughing – double minor | 15:38 | 4:00 |
| 3rd | COL | Jack Johnson (served by Alex Newhook) | Unsportsmanlike conduct | 15:38 | 2:00 |
| 3rd | COL | Jack Johnson | Roughing – double minor | 15:38 | 4:00 |

Shots by period
| Team | 1 | 2 | 3 | Total |
|---|---|---|---|---|
| TBL | 5 | 7 | 4 | 16 |
| COL | 11 | 12 | 7 | 30 |

=== Game three ===
| June 20 | Colorado Avalanche | 2–6 | Tampa Bay Lightning | Amalie Arena | Recap |

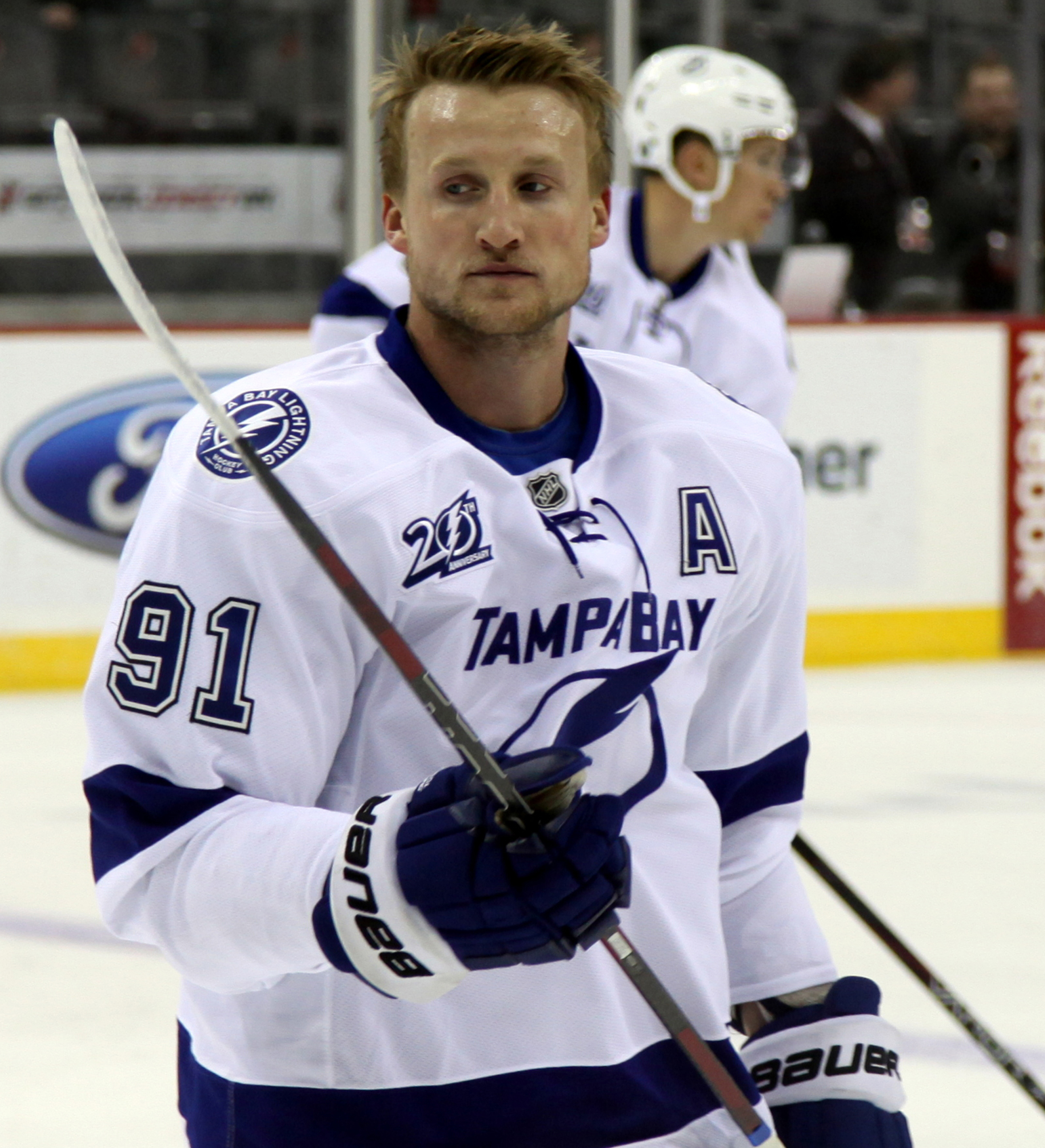
Steven Stamkos scored a goal and two points in game three.

In game three, the Lightning showed more offence than their previous two games. However, the Avalanche began the scoring in the first period. After a coach's challenge revealed Valeri Nichushkin's goal was offside, and then Ondrej Palat got called for high-sticking, Colorado went on the power-play. During the power-play, Cale Makar set up Mikko Rantanen for a quick shot through traffic which pinballed off Andrei Vasilevskiy and Erik Cernak for an easy tap-in for Avalanche captain Gabriel Landeskog. The Lightning tied the game less than five minutes later when the Avalanche gave the puck away to Anthony Cirelli who passed to Patrick Maroon and then back again to Cirelli who tried to deke out Darcy Kuemper except his mishandling of the puck went five-hole through Kuemper. The Lightning then gained the lead for the first time in this series after Devon Toews fanned on a pass leading to a breakout of Tampa Bay. Palat and Nikita Kucherov went down the ice, with Steven Stamkos trailing. Palat passed back to Stamkos who set up Palat again for a snap shot that went past Kuemper for a 2–1 lead. In the second period, the Lightning outscored the Avalanche, four goals to one. The first goal came off a turn-over from Colorado's Josh Manson who gave the puck to Victor Hedman setting up an open Nick Paul for a 3–1 lead. However, the Avalanche minimized the Lightning's lead to one goal, when on the power-play, Rantanen and Makar set up Landeskog's snap shot goal. Tampa Bay regained their two-goal lead when Kucherov and Stamkos lead the offensive zone rush with Kucherov back-handing a pass to an open Stamkos for a quick wrist shot. Patrick Maroon made it 5–2 deking out the defencemen with his shot rolling up Kuemper's blocker to the top of the net. Corey Perry made it 6–2 when the Lightning were on the power-play, tipping in a shot by Palat that went over Pavel Francouz. Although the third period had no goals scored, both teams leveled their frustration at each other with both Logan O'Connor and Ross Colton fighting and Patrick Maroon and Andrew Cogliano both squaring off after the whistle resulting in misconducts.

Scoring summary
| Period | Team | Goal | Assist(s) | Time | Score |
|---|---|---|---|---|---|
| 1st | COL | Gabriel Landeskog (10) – pp | Mikko Rantanen (18), Cale Makar (18) | 08:19 | 1–0 COL |
| 1st | TBL | Anthony Cirelli (2) | Patrick Maroon (2) | 13:03 | 1–1 |
| 1st | TBL | Ondrej Palat (10) | Steven Stamkos (7) | 14:54 | 2–1 TBL |
| 2nd | TBL | Nick Paul (5) | Ross Colton (4) | 01:26 | 3–1 TBL |
| 2nd | COL | Gabriel Landeskog (11) | Cale Makar (19), Mikko Rantanen (19) | 04:43 | 3–2 TBL |
| 2nd | TBL | Steven Stamkos (10) | Nikita Kucherov (18), Zach Bogosian (3) | 07:52 | 4–2 TBL |
| 2nd | TBL | Patrick Maroon (4) | Nikita Kucherov (19), Victor Hedman (14) | 11:15 | 5–2 TBL |
| 2nd | TBL | Corey Perry (6) – pp | Ondrej Palat (9), Victor Hedman (15) | 14:58 | 6–2 TBL |
| 3rd | None | | | | |
Penalty summary
| Period | Team | Player | Penalty | Time | PIM |
| 1st | COL | J. T. Compher | Interference | 05:50 | 2:00 |
| 1st | TBL | Ondrej Palat | High-sticking | 07:09 | 2:00 |
| 1st | COL | Alex Newhook | Holding the stick | 10:54 | 2:00 |
| 2nd | TBL | Ross Colton | Hooking | 04:03 | 2:00 |
| 2nd | TBL | Patrick Maroon | Roughing | 08:50 | 2:00 |
| 2nd | COL | Josh Manson | Roughing | 08:50 | 2:00 |
| 2nd | COL | Nico Sturm | Delay of game (puck over glass) | 14:22 | 2:00 |
| 2nd | TBL | Alex Killorn | Slashing | 15:45 | 2:00 |
| 2nd | COL | Andrew Cogliano | Roughing | 19:43 | 2:00 |
| 2nd | TBL | Mikhail Sergachev | Roughing | 19:43 | 2:00 |
| 3rd | COL | Andrew Cogliano | Unsportsmanlike conduct | 12:03 | 2:00 |
| 3rd | COL | Devon Toews | Cross-checking | 13:38 | 2:00 |
| 3rd | TBL | Bench (served by Corey Perry) | Too many men on the ice | 14:40 | 2:00 |
| 3rd | COL | Logan O'Connor | Fighting – major | 17:48 | 5:00 |
| 3rd | COL | Andrew Cogliano (served by Nicolas Aube-Kubel) | Slashing | 17:48 | 2:00 |
| 3rd | TBL | Patrick Maroon | Misconduct | 17:48 | 10:00 |
| 3rd | COL | Andrew Cogliano | Misconduct | 17:48 | 10:00 |
| 3rd | TBL | Ross Colton | Fighting – major | 17:48 | 5:00 |

Shots by period
| Team | 1 | 2 | 3 | Total |
|---|---|---|---|---|
| COL | 14 | 13 | 12 | 39 |
| TBL | 12 | 15 | 6 | 33 |

=== Game four ===
| June 22 | Colorado Avalanche | 3–2 | OT | Tampa Bay Lightning | Amalie Arena | Recap |

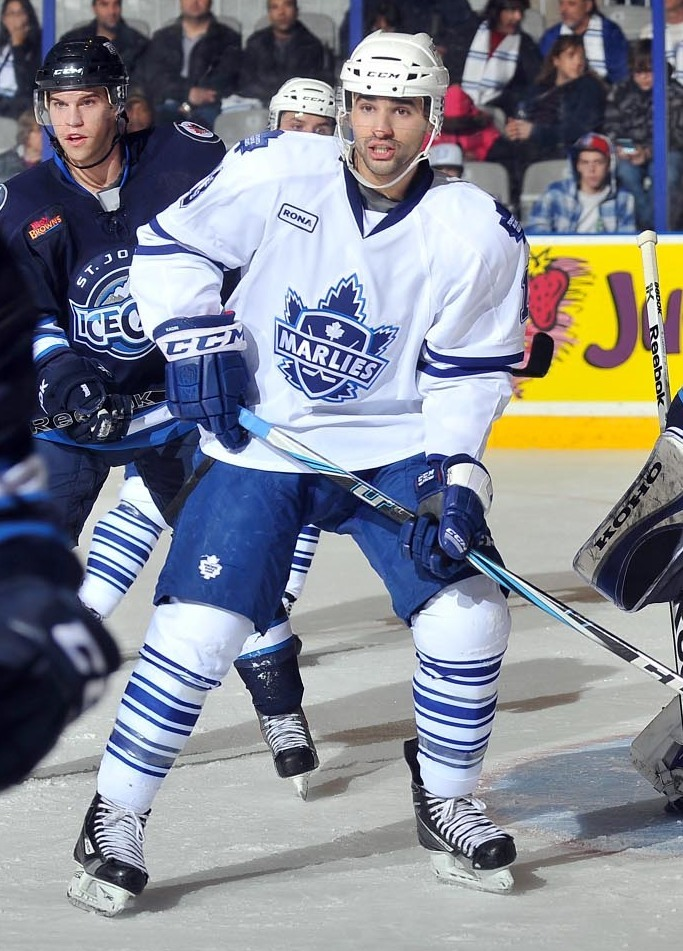
Nazem Kadri, shown with the Toronto Marlies in 2012, returned to the Avalanche lineup and scored the overtime-winning goal in game four.

In game four, the Lightning and Avalanche traded off periods where one team dominated the shot clock. The first period saw Tampa Bay fire 17 shots compared to Colorado's four shots. The third shot for the Lightning 36 seconds into the game gave Tampa Bay their first goal when Erik Cernak's shot bounced off of goaltender Darcy Kuemper to Anthony Cirelli who fired it into the net. Although Kuemper's mask had come off during the play, it was still ruled a goal due to the continuation of the puck. In the second period, the Avalanche poured off 17 shots compared to the Lightning's seven shots. Both teams ended up scoring this period. Colorado got the equalizer on the power-play when Nathan MacKinnon passed to Mikko Rantanen who passed to the front of the net and MacKinnon redirected the puck in with his skate. Tampa Bay regained the lead as defenceman Victor Hedman led the rush into the offensive zone, slipping by the defenders, and backhanding a shot over Kuemper for 2–1 advantage. However, as the teams switched on shots again, this time with Tampa Bay shooting ten times compared to Colorado's six, the Avalanche tied the game. As the Avalanche were working the point, Darren Helm shot at Andrei Vasilevskiy and the rebound went to Nico Sturm whose shot deflected off of Andrew Cogliano and into the net. With the game tied at two goals apiece, the game went into overtime. In overtime, Kuemper flipped the puck ahead to Artturi Lehkonen who passed to a speeding Nazem Kadri who got the shot through Vasilevskiy and into the top part of the net. The goal gave Colorado a 3–2 victory and a chance to win the series in Game 5 in Colorado.

Scoring summary
| Period | Team | Goal | Assist(s) | Time | Score |
|---|---|---|---|---|---|
| 1st | TBL | Anthony Cirelli (3) | Erik Cernak (1) | 00:36 | 1–0 TBL |
| 2nd | COL | Nathan MacKinnon (12) – pp | Mikko Rantanen (20), Cale Makar (20) | 05:17 | 1–1 |
| 2nd | TBL | Victor Hedman (3) | Jan Rutta (4) | 10:42 | 2–1 TBL |
| 3rd | COL | Andrew Cogliano (3) | Nico Sturm (2), Darren Helm (3) | 02:53 | 2–2 |
| OT | COL | Nazem Kadri (7) | Artturi Lehkonen (6), Darcy Kuemper (1) | 12:02 | 3–2 COL |
Penalty summary
| Period | Team | Player | Penalty | Time | PIM |
| 1st | COL | Darren Helm | Interference | 16:57 | 2:00 |
| 2nd | TBL | Victor Hedman | Interference | 03:57 | 2:00 |
| 2nd | COL | Bowen Byram | Hooking | 06:12 | 2:00 |
| 2nd | TBL | Steven Stamkos | Hooking | 11:48 | 2:00 |
| 3rd | None | | | | |
| OT | None | | | | |

Shots by period
| Team | 1 | 2 | 3 | OT | Total |
|---|---|---|---|---|---|
| COL | 4 | 17 | 6 | 10 | 37 |
| TBL | 17 | 9 | 10 | 3 | 39 |

=== Game five ===
| June 24 | Tampa Bay Lightning | 3–2 | Colorado Avalanche | Ball Arena | Recap |

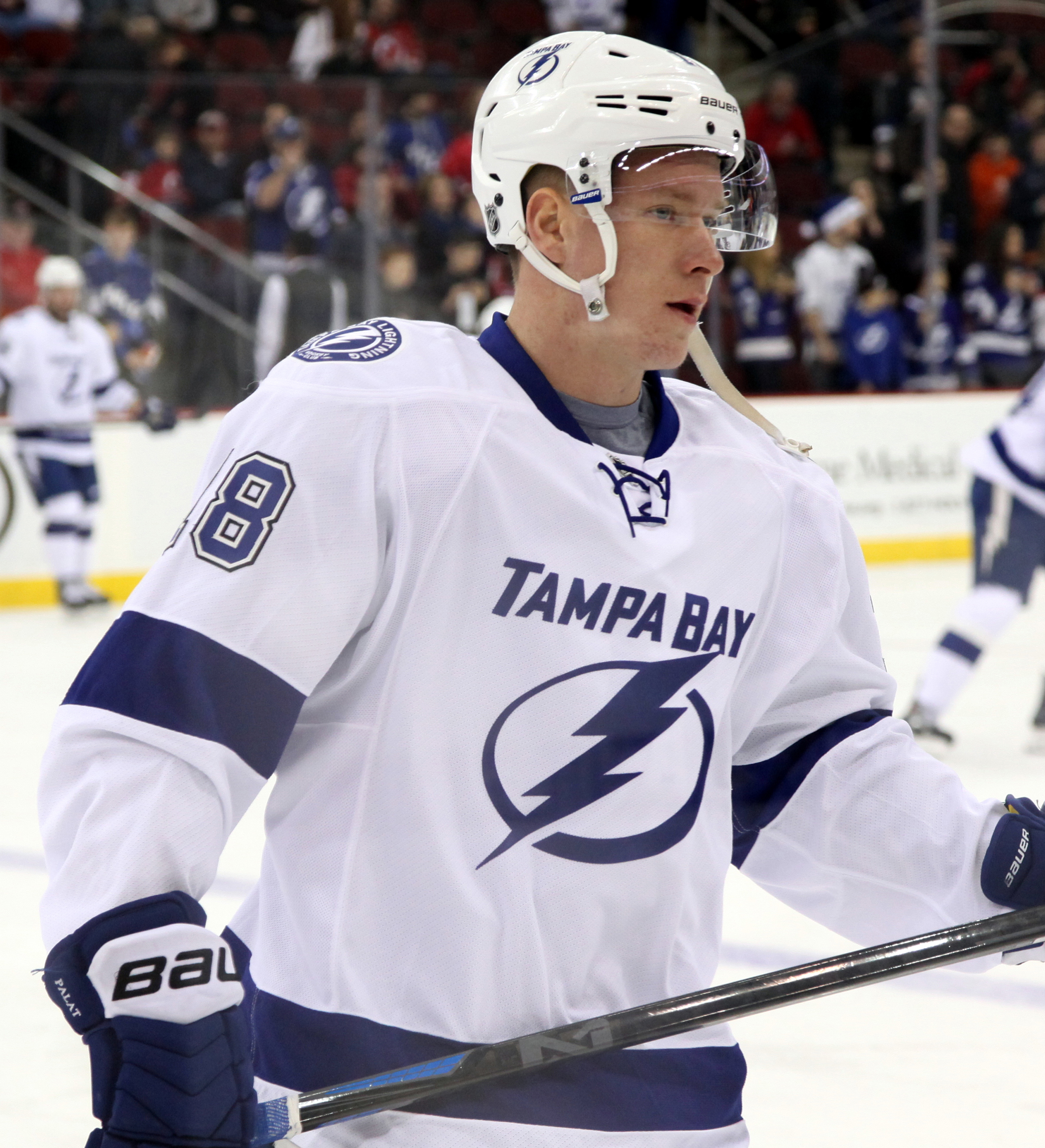
Ondrej Palat scored the game-winning goal in game five.

With a potential Stanley Cup victory in Colorado for the Avalanche in game five, the Lightning tried to hold on to extend the series. The first period saw both teams relatively even in shots with Colorado holding a one-shot advantage. However, Tampa Bay began the scoring as Mikhail Sergachev cleared the defensive zone forwarding a pass to Corey Perry with a cross-ice pass to Jan Rutta whose slap shot found its way past Darcy Kuemper for a 1–0 lead. The second period held a different story as the Avalanche held a stronger advantage in shots and managed to tie the game, prior to Tampa Bay's proceeding goal. The Avalanche, upon winning a faceoff, had Nathan MacKinnon pass to Cale Makar who shot the puck at Andrei Vasilevskiy but the rebound bounced to Valeri Nichushkin for an easy tap-in goal. Nikita Kucherov put the Lightning up 2–1 on a 4-on-3 power-play as his one-timer through traffic found its way above Kuemper's blocker to the back of the net. Much like in game four, the Avalanche tied the game in the third period. Once Colorado was able to enter the offensive zone, they set up Makar for a wrist shot through traffic that deflected off of Vasilevskiy, rebounding to Erik Cernak's skate and pinballing through Vasilevskiy and into the net. However, the Lightning reobtained the lead with less than seven minutes left, as the Lightning worked the offensive zone, eventually leading to an Ondrej Palat one-timer that got past Kuemper for a 3–2 advantage. The Avalanche continued to press the Lightning. However, Tampa Bay held off any late attempts to win the game 3–2 and force a sixth game.

Scoring summary
| Period | Team | Goal | Assist(s) | Time | Score |
|---|---|---|---|---|---|
| 1st | TBL | Jan Rutta (1) | Corey Perry (4), Mikhail Sergachev (7) | 15:23 | 1–0 TBL |
| 2nd | COL | Valeri Nichushkin (9) | Cale Makar (21), Nathan MacKinnon (10) | 05:07 | 1–1 |
| 2nd | TBL | Nikita Kucherov (8) – pp | Steven Stamkos (8), Corey Perry (5) | 08:10 | 2–1 TBL |
| 3rd | COL | Cale Makar (8) | Devon Toews (10), Valeri Nichushkin (6) | 02:31 | 2–2 |
| 3rd | TBL | Ondrej Palat (11) | Victor Hedman (16), Mikhail Sergachev (8) | 13:38 | 3–2 TBL |
Penalty summary
| Period | Team | Player | Penalty | Time | PIM |
| 1st | COL | J. T. Compher | High-sticking | 03:13 | 2:00 |
| 1st | COL | Nazem Kadri | Hooking | 06:58 | 2:00 |
| 1st | TBL | Steven Stamkos | Interference | 11:17 | 2:00 |
| 2nd | TBL | Alex Killorn | Holding | 06:27 | 2:00 |
| 2nd | COL | J. T. Compher | Holding the stick | 06:27 | 2:00 |
| 2nd | COL | Cale Makar | Tripping | 06:58 | 2:00 |
| 2nd | TBL | Ross Colton | High-sticking | 16:17 | 2:00 |
| 3rd | COL | Bench (served by Alex Newhook) | Too many men on the ice | 17:17 | 2:00 |

Shots by period
| Team | 1 | 2 | 3 | Total |
|---|---|---|---|---|
| TBL | 11 | 8 | 10 | 29 |
| COL | 12 | 14 | 11 | 37 |

=== Game six ===
| June 26 | Colorado Avalanche | 2–1 | Tampa Bay Lightning | Amalie Arena | Recap |

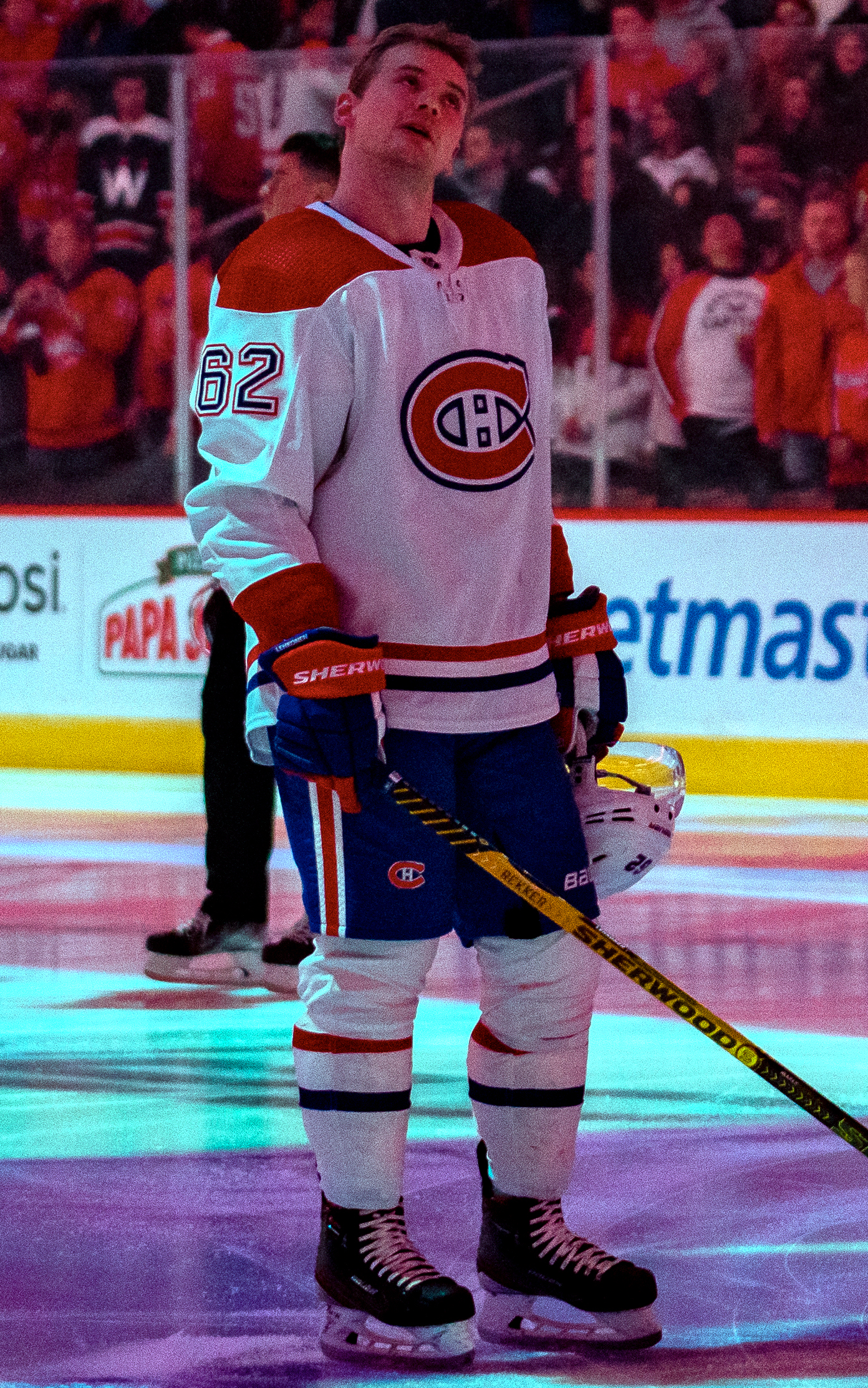
Artturi Lehkonen, shown with Montreal, scored the Stanley Cup-clinching goal in game six.

Back in Tampa for game six, the Lightning struck first during the first period. As the Lightning were working the forecheck, a giveaway by Cale Makar brought an errant deflection to Steven Stamkos who put it five-hole through Darcy Kuemper. The Avalanche managed to tie the game in the second period during their offensive zone coverage which led to a delayed penalty on Tampa Bay. On the delayed penalty, Nathan MacKinnon's shot from the short side beat Andrei Vasilevskiy. Colorado then gained the lead when a 3–on–2 involving Josh Manson, MacKinnon, and Artturi Lehkonen resulted in a wrist shot by the latter to go up 2–1. With the lead the Avalanche continued to shoot at the Lightning goaltender while also maintaining defence. The Avalanche held on to claim a 2–1 victory to win their third Stanley Cup.

Cale Makar was awarded the Conn Smythe Trophy as most valuable player during the playoffs. He became the third defenceman to win the Norris Trophy, Conn Smythe Trophy and Stanley Cup in the same year; equalling Bobby Orr and Nicklas Lidstrom in accomplishing this feat. Corey Perry became the first player in league history to be on the losing side of three consecutive Final series, while playing for three different teams.

Scoring summary
| Period | Team | Goal | Assist(s) | Time | Score |
|---|---|---|---|---|---|
| 1st | TBL | Steven Stamkos (11) | Ondrej Palat (10) | 03:48 | 1–0 TBL |
| 2nd | COL | Nathan MacKinnon (13) | Bowen Byram (9), Gabriel Landeskog (11) | 01:54 | 1–1 |
| 2nd | COL | Artturi Lehkonen (8) | Nathan MacKinnon (11), Josh Manson (5) | 12:28 | 2–1 COL |
3rd
| 3rd | None | | | | |
Penalty summary
| Period | Team | Player | Penalty | Time | PIM |
| 1st | COL | Cale Makar | Interference | 00:23 | 2:00 |
| 2nd | TBL | Ryan McDonagh | Boarding | 14:53 | 2:00 |
| 3rd | None | | | | |

Shots by period
| Team | 1 | 2 | 3 | Total |
|---|---|---|---|---|
| COL | 8 | 13 | 9 | 30 |
| TBL | 10 | 9 | 4 | 23 |

== Team rosters ==
Years indicated in boldface under the "Final appearance" column signify that the player won the Stanley Cup in the given year.

=== Tampa Bay Lightning ===
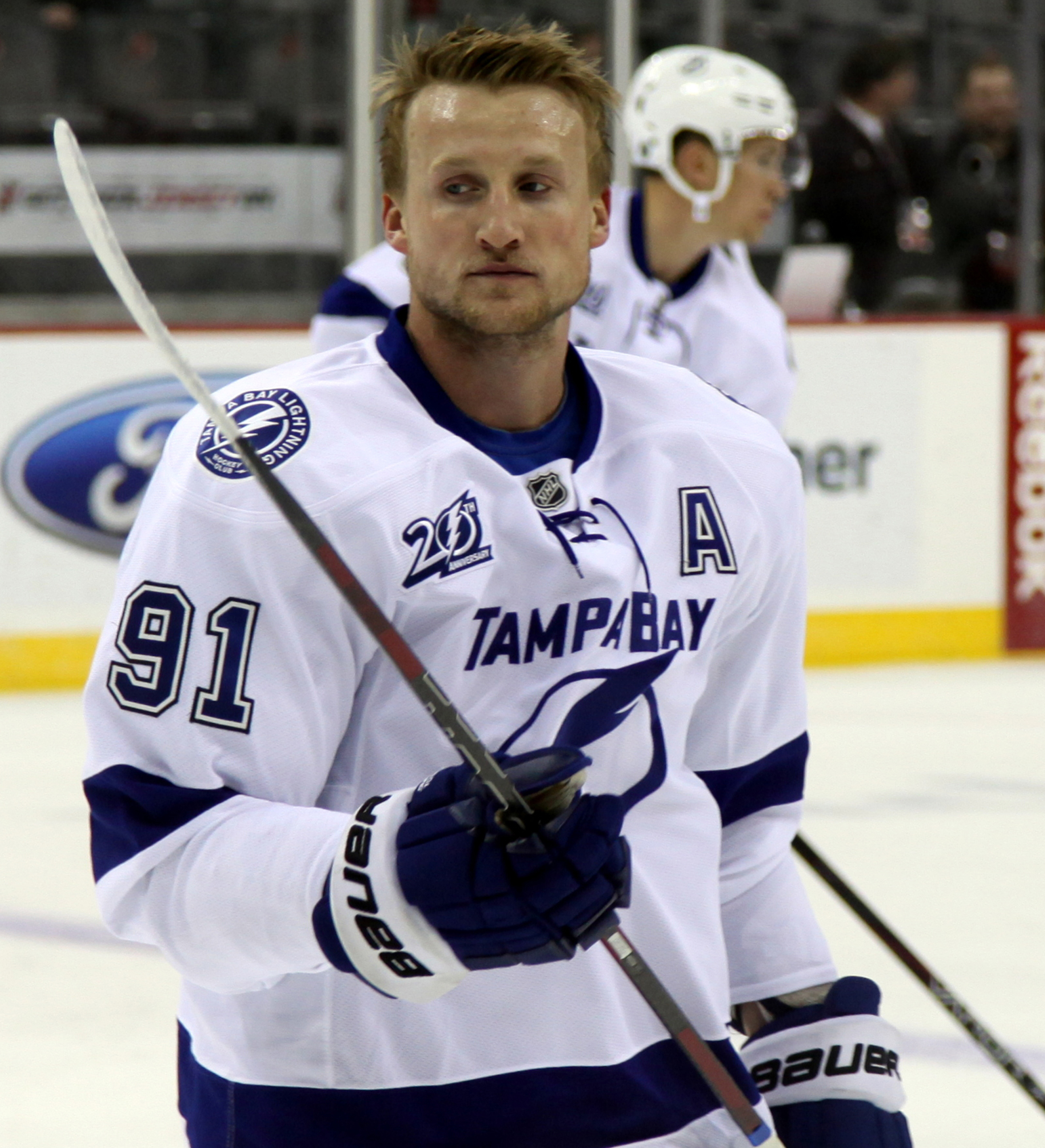
Steven Stamkos captained the Lightning to their third-straight Final appearance, fourth since 2015 and fifth overall in franchise history.

| # | Nat | Player | Position | Hand | Age | Acquired | Place of birth | Final appearance |
|---|---|---|---|---|---|---|---|---|
| 12 | (Canada) | Alex Barre-Boulet | C | L | 25 | 2021 | Montmagny, Quebec | second (**2021**) |
| 41 | (France) | Pierre-Edouard Bellemare | C | L | 37 | 2021 | Le Blanc-Mesnil, France | second (2018) |
| 24 | (United States) | Zach Bogosian | D | R | 31 | 2021 | Massena, New York | second (**2020**) |
| 81 | (Slovakia) | Erik Cernak | D | L | 25 | 2017 | Košice, Slovakia | third (**2020, 2021**) |
| 71 | (Canada) | Anthony Cirelli | C | L | 24 | 2015 | Woodbridge, Ontario | third (**2020, 2021**) |
| 79 | (United States) | Ross Colton | C | L | 25 | 2016 | Robbinsville, New Jersey | second (**2021**) |
| 1 | (Canada) | Brian Elliott | G | L | 37 | 2021 | Newmarket, Ontario | first |
| 52 | (Canada) | Callan Foote | D | R | 23 | 2017 | Englewood, Colorado | second (**2021**) |
| 38 | (Canada) | Brandon Hagel | LW | L | 23 | 2022 | Saskatoon, Saskatchewan | first |
| 77 | (Sweden) | Victor Hedman – **A** | D | L | 31 | 2009 | Örnsköldsvik, Sweden | fourth (2015, **2020, 2021**) |
| 17 | (Canada) | Alex Killorn – **A** | LW | L | 32 | 2007 | Halifax, Nova Scotia | fourth (2015, **2020, 2021**) |
| 86 | (Russia) | Nikita Kucherov | RW | L | 28 | 2011 | Maykop, Russia | fourth (2015, **2020, 2021**) |
| 14 | (United States) | Patrick Maroon | LW | L | 34 | 2019 | St. Louis, Missouri | fourth (**2019**, **2020, 2021**) |
| 27 | (United States) | Ryan McDonagh – **A** | D | L | 32 | 2018 | Saint Paul, Minnesota | fourth (2014, **2020, 2021**) |
| 16 | (Canada) | Riley Nash | C | R | 33 | 2022 | Consort, Alberta | first |
| 18 | (Czech Republic) | Ondrej Palat | LW | L | 31 | 2011 | Frýdek-Místek, Czechoslovakia | fourth (2015, **2020, 2021**) |
| 20 | (Canada) | Nick Paul | LW | L | 27 | 2022 | Mississauga, Ontario | first |
| 10 | (Canada) | Corey Perry | RW | R | 37 | 2021 | New Liskeard, Ontario | fourth (**2007**, 2020, 2021) |
| 21 | (Canada) | Brayden Point | C | R | 26 | 2014 | Calgary, Alberta | third (**2020, 2021**) |
| 93 | (Canada) | Anthony Richard | C | L | 25 | 2022 | Trois-Rivières, Quebec | first |
| 44 | (Czech Republic) | Jan Rutta | D | R | 31 | 2019 | Písek, Czechoslovakia | third (**2020, 2021**) |
| 98 | (Russia) | Mikhail Sergachev | D | L | 23 | 2017 | Nizhnekamsk, Russia | third (**2020, 2021**) |
| 91 | (Canada) | Steven Stamkos – **C** | C | R | 32 | 2008 | Markham, Ontario | fourth (2015, **2020, 2021**) |
| 88 | (Russia) | Andrei Vasilevskiy | G | L | 27 | 2012 | Tyumen, Russia | fourth (2015, **2020, 2021**) |

=== Colorado Avalanche ===
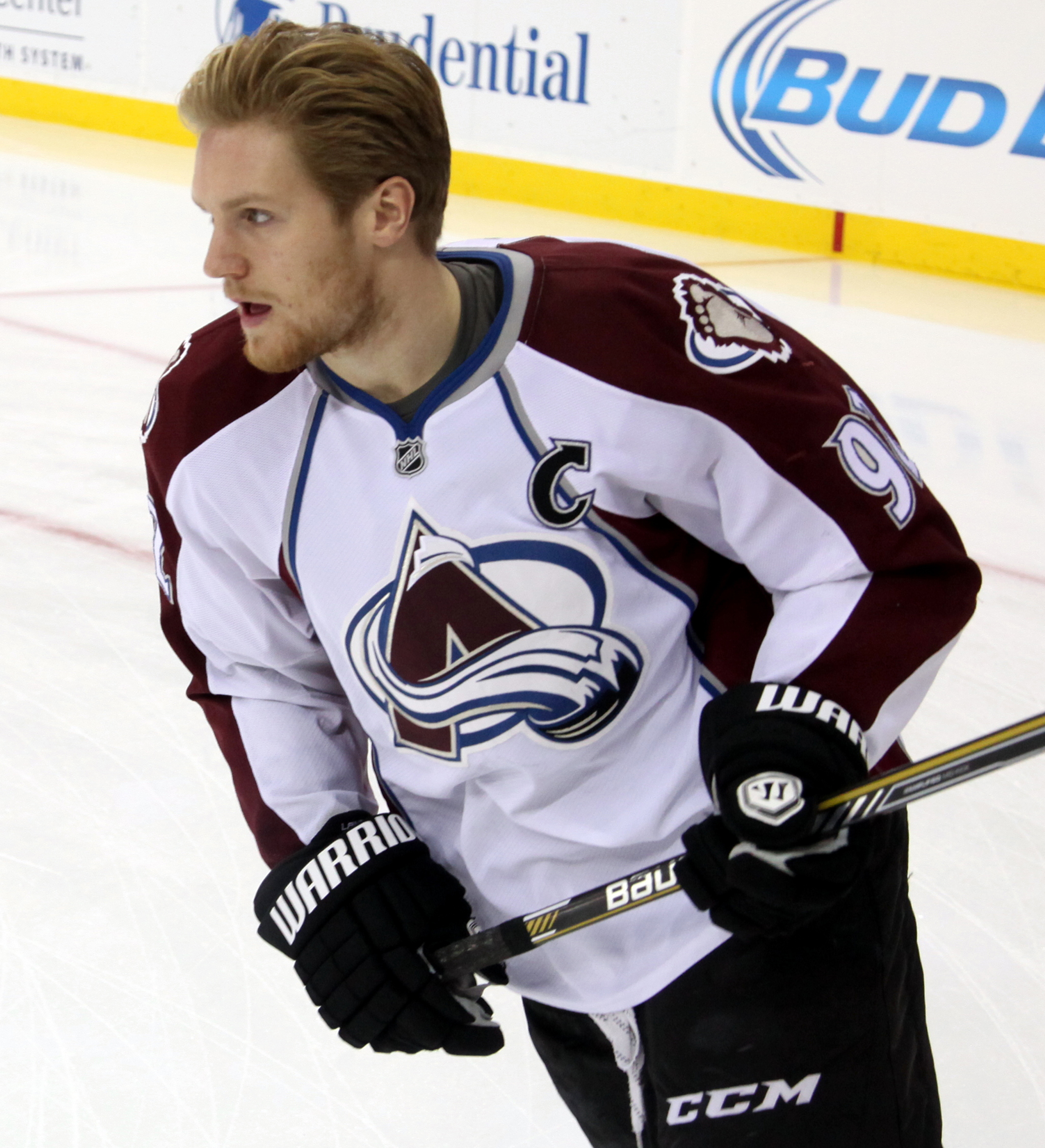
Gabriel Landeskog captained the Avalanche to their third Final appearance in franchise history and first since 2001.

| # | Nat | Player | Position | Hand | Age | Acquired | Place of birth | Final appearance |
|---|---|---|---|---|---|---|---|---|
| 60 | (Finland) | Justus Annunen | G | L | 22 | 2018 | Kempele, Finland | first |
| 16 | (Canada) | Nicolas Aube-Kubel | RW | R | 26 | 2021 | Slave Lake, Alberta | first |
| 95 | (Sweden) | Andre Burakovsky | LW | L | 27 | 2019 | Klagenfurt, Austria | second (**2018**) |
| 4 | (Canada) | Bowen Byram | D | L | 21 | 2019 | Cranbrook, British Columbia | first |
| 11 | (Canada) | Andrew Cogliano | C/LW | L | 34 | 2022 | Toronto, Ontario | second (2020) |
| 37 | (United States) | J. T. Compher | C | R | 27 | 2015 | Northbrook, Illinois | first |
| 39 | (Czech Republic) | Pavel Francouz | G | R | 32 | 2018 | Plzeň, Czechoslovakia | first |
| 49 | (Canada) | Sam Girard | D | L | 24 | 2017 | Roberval, Quebec | first |
| 43 | (Canada) | Darren Helm | C | L | 35 | 2021 | St. Andrews, Manitoba | third (**2008**, 2009) |
| 6 | (United States) | Erik Johnson | D | R | 34 | 2011 | Bloomington, Minnesota | first |
| 3 | (United States) | Jack Johnson | D | L | 35 | 2021 | Indianapolis, Indiana | first |
| 91 | (Canada) | Nazem Kadri | C | L | 31 | 2019 | London, Ontario | first |
| 35 | (Canada) | Darcy Kuemper | G | L | 32 | 2021 | Saskatoon, Saskatchewan | first |
| 92 | (Sweden) | Gabriel Landeskog – **C** | LW | L | 29 | 2011 | Stockholm, Sweden | first |
| 62 | (Finland) | Artturi Lehkonen | LW | L | 26 | 2022 | Piikkiö, Finland | second (2021) |
| 56 | (Canada) | Kurtis MacDermid | D | L | 28 | 2021 | Quebec City, Quebec | first (did not play) |
| 29 | (Canada) | Nathan MacKinnon – **A** | C | R | 26 | 2013 | Halifax, Nova Scotia | first |
| 8 | (Canada) | Cale Makar | D | R | 23 | 2017 | Calgary, Alberta | first |
| 42 | (United States) | Josh Manson | D | R | 30 | 2022 | Hinsdale, Illinois | first |
| 59 | (United States) | Ben Meyers | C | L | 23 | 2022 | Delano, Minnesota | first |
| 32 | (United States) | Hunter Miska | G | L | 26 | 2019 | Stacy, Minnesota | first |
| 28 | (Canada) | Ryan Murray | D | L | 28 | 2021 | Regina, Saskatchewan | first (did not play) |
| 18 | (Canada) | Alex Newhook | C | L | 21 | 2019 | St. John's, Newfoundland | first |
| 13 | (Russia) | Valeri Nichushkin | RW | L | 27 | 2019 | Chelyabinsk, Russia | first |
| 25 | (Canada) | Logan O'Connor | RW | R | 25 | 2018 | Missouri City, Texas | first |
| 96 | (Finland) | Mikko Rantanen – **A** | RW | L | 25 | 2015 | Nousiainen, Finland | first |
| 78 | (Germany) | Nico Sturm | C | L | 27 | 2022 | Augsburg, Germany | first |
| 7 | (Canada) | Devon Toews | D | L | 28 | 2020 | Abbotsford, British Columbia | first |

== Stanley Cup engraving ==
The Stanley Cup was presented to Avalanche captain Gabriel Landeskog by NHL deputy commissioner Bill Daly following the Avalanche's 2–1 win in Game 6.

This is a list of 52 names that were engraved on the Stanley Cup in 2022:

2021–22 Colorado Avalanche

=== Players ===
Centres

- 11 Andrew Cogliano*
- 18 Alex Newhook*
- 29 Nathan MacKinnon (A)
- 37 J. T. Compher*
- 43 Darren Helm*
- 78 Nico Sturm
- 91 Nazem Kadri

Wingers

- 13 Valeri Nichushkin
- 16 Nicolas Aube-Kubel
- 25 Logan O'Connor
- 62 Artturi Lehkonen
- 92 Gabriel Landeskog (Captain)
- 95 Andre Burakovsky
- 96 Mikko Rantanen (A)

Defencemen

- 3 Jack Johnson
- 4 Bowen Byram
- 6 Erik Johnson
- 7 Devon Toews
- 8 Cale Makar
- 28 Ryan Murray ‡
- 42 Josh Manson
- 49 Sam Girard
- 56 Kurtis MacDermid †

Goaltenders

- 35 Darcy Kuemper
- 39 Pavel Francouz
- * Played both centre and wing.
- † Did not play in Final.
- ‡ Exemption granted to engrave the name of a player who did not automatically qualify. (Note: Automatic qualification for a player's name to be engraved on the Stanley Cup: Playing in (for a goaltender, dressing for) at least one Stanley Cup Final game or at least half of the Stanley Cup winning team's regular season games.)

=== Coaching and administrative staff ===
- E. Stanley Kroenke (Chairman/Owner), Josh Kroenke (President/Vice Chairman/Governor/Minority Owner), Joe Sakic (Exe Vice President/Alt. Governor/General Manager),
- Craig Billington (Asst. General Manager/AHL General Manager), Chris MacFarland (Asst. General Manager), Jared Bednar (Head Coach)
- Ray Bennett (Asst. Coach), Nolan Pratt (Asst. Coach), Jussi Parkkila (Goaltending Coach), Brett Heimlich (Video Coach)
- Shawn Allard (Skills Coach), Brendan McNicholas (Vice President, Media & Players Relations), Matt Sokolowski (Athletic Trainer)
- Scott Woodward (Director of Rehabilitation), Donovan Delarosbil (Asst. Athletic Trainer), J.C. Ihrig (Equipment Manager), Donny White (Asst. Equipment Manager)
- Brad Lewkow (Asst. Equipment Manager), Casey Bond (Strength & Conditioning Coach), Yevgeniy Haletskiy (Massage Therapist)
- Wade Klippenstein (Director of Amateur Scouting), Brian Willsie (Director of Player Development), Brad Smith (Director, Reserve List Scouting), Garth Joy (Sr. Pro Scout)
- Terry Martin (Pro Scout), Miroslav Zalesak (Pro Scout, Europe), Dan Laperriere (Pro Scout)

=== Engraving Notes ===
- #28 Ryan Murray (D) played in 37 regular season games, but did not dress in the playoffs. He had missed 39 games in the regular season due to injuries. As he did not automatically qualify, Murray was given an exemption for spending the entire season on the Avalanche roster.
- Charlotte Grahame (Vice President of Hockey Administration) and Curtis Leschyshyn (Pro Scout) had their names left off the Cup so two other pro scouts would have their names engraved for the first time; Grahame was previously included when Colorado won the Cup in 2001, while Leschyshyn won the Cup with the Avalanche as a player in 1996. Ten more amateur scouts, two development coaches, and more team executives and club staff were left off the Cup due the 52-name limit; all received championship rings.

=== Left off the Stanley Cup ===
- Eleven players that were on the roster were left off the Stanley Cup engraving due to not qualifying. None of them played in the playoffs. They received championship rings, but were left off the Stanley Cup engraving. Colorado did not request an exemption to engrave any of their names.

Included in team picture

- #12 Jayson Megna (C) – 20 regular season games
- #26 Jacob MacDonald (D) – 8 regular season games
- #60 Justus Annunen (G) – 2 regular season games, dressed for 3 playoff games

Not in team picture

- #11-#57 Mikhail Maltsev (Note: Mikhail Maltsev wore #11 when he played in regular season games for Colorado. After being sent to the minors mid-season, Andrew Cogliano took #11 after being traded to Colorado. Maltsev was later recalled for the playoffs. As Maltsev did not play in the playoffs and is not in the team picture, it is unclear if he was assigned a new number.) (LW) – 18 regular season games
- #9 Dylan Sikura (C) – 5 regular season games
- #61 Martin Kaut (RW) – 6 regular season games
- #67 Keaton Middleton (D) – 0 regular season games, 49 games with Colorado of the American Hockey League (AHL)
- #93 Jean-Luc Foudy (C) – 0 regular season games, 65 games with Colorado of the AHL
- #10 Roland McKeown (D) – 0 regular season games, 61 games with Colorado of the AHL
- #32 Hunter Miska (G) – 0 regular season games, 17 games with Colorado of the AHL
- #50 Trent Miner (G) – 0 regular season games, 5 games with Colorado of the AHL

== Media rights ==
In Canada, this was the eighth consecutive Stanley Cup Final broadcast by Sportsnet and CBC Television in English, and TVA Sports in French. The series was also streamed on Sportsnet Now and Rogers NHL Live. Some stations in Sportsnet's sibling broadcast network Citytv also simulcast ABC's coverage of the deciding Game 6 for simultaneous substitution purposes, similarly to how Canadian networks handled the 2019 NBA Finals.

In the United States, the series was televised on ABC and streamed on ESPN+. This was the first year of a seven-year deal in which ABC broadcasts the Final in even years, alternating with TNT. This was thus ABC's first Final since 2004. With the entire series on ABC, 2022 was the first time that the Final series were carried in their entirety on broadcast television since 1980 (under ABC/ESPN's previous contract, the series was split between the two networks. And under the previous broadcast deal with NBC, coverage of the series was also split with two games exclusive to NBCSN). ABC's coverage drew the Final's highest average viewership since 2019, with 4.6 million viewers.

== Notes ==
| Preceded by Tampa Bay Lightning; 2021 | Colorado Avalanche; Stanley Cup champions 2022 | Succeeded by Vegas Golden Knights; 2023 |
