= Ryan Murray =

Canadian ice hockey player (born 1993)

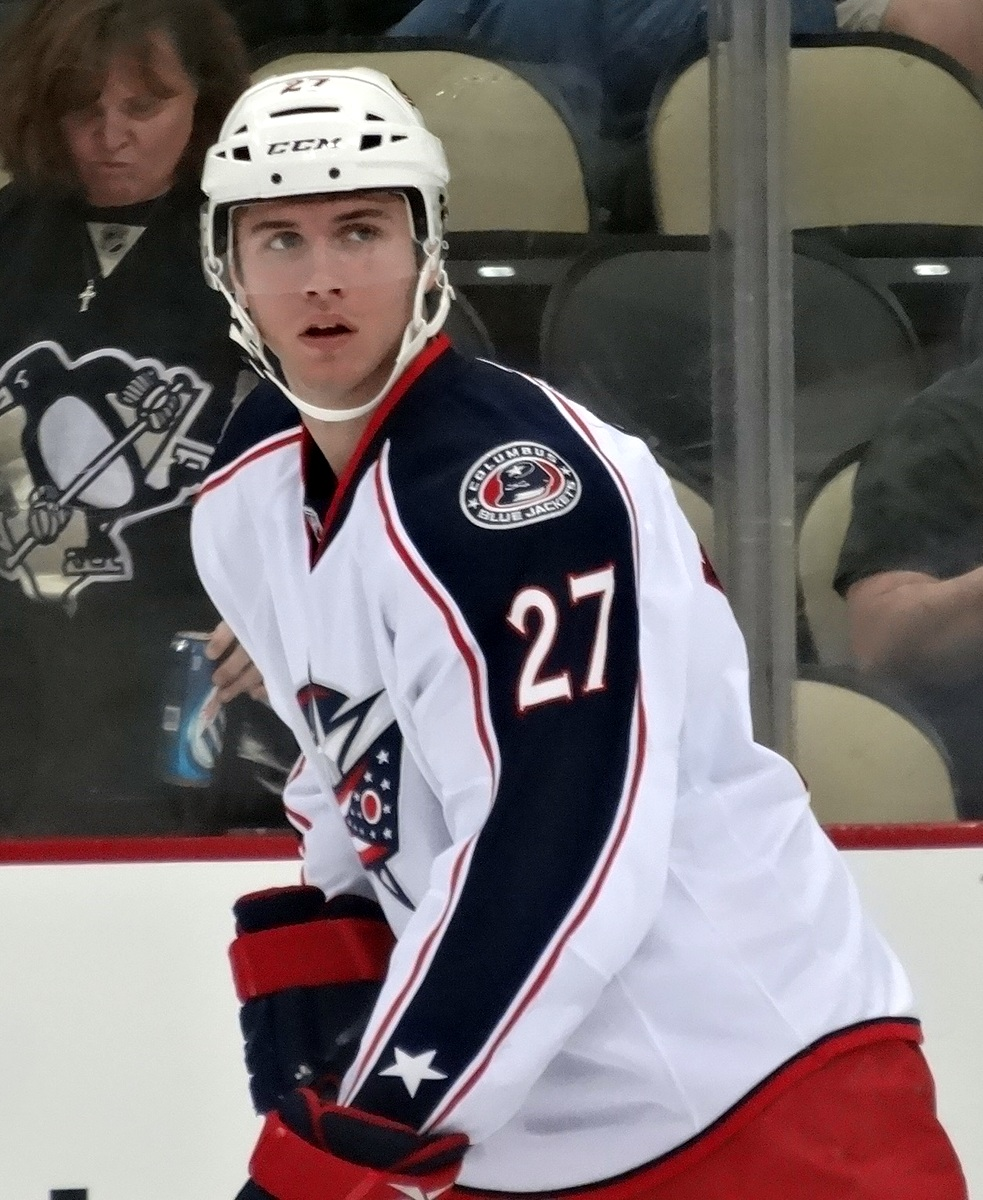
- Murray with the Columbus Blue Jackets in 2013
- Born: September 27, 1993 (age 32) Regina, Saskatchewan, Canada
- Height: 6 ft 0 in (183 cm)
- Weight: 206 lb (93 kg; 14 st 10 lb)
- Position: Defence
- Shot: Left
- Played for: Columbus Blue Jackets; New Jersey Devils; Colorado Avalanche; Edmonton Oilers
- National team: Canada
- NHL draft: 2nd overall, 2012; Columbus Blue Jackets
- Playing career: 2013–2023

Ryan James Murray (born September 27, 1993) is a Canadian former professional ice hockey defenceman who played in the National Hockey League (NHL). Murray was drafted second overall by the Columbus Blue Jackets in the 2012 NHL entry draft. Murray won the Stanley Cup with the Colorado Avalanche in 2022.

== Playing career ==
=== Junior ===
Murray was drafted ninth overall by the Everett Silvertips at the 2008 WHL Bantam Draft. He was later named captain of the team for the start of his third season in Everett.

=== Professional ===
==== Columbus Blue Jackets ====
On June 22, 2012, he was chosen second overall by the Columbus Blue Jackets at the 2012 NHL entry draft after he was ranked second among North American skaters in the NHL Central Scouting list. The following month on July 24, 2012, Murray signed a three-year entry-level contract with the Blue Jackets. On November 16, 2012, Murray injured his shoulder during a game with the Silvertips. He would later undergo shoulder surgery and miss the rest of the WHL season (also making him unavailable for NHL play).

Murray played his first NHL game on October 4, 2013, against the Calgary Flames. He scored his first NHL goal on October 25, 2013, against Jonathan Bernier of the Toronto Maple Leafs. Murray has missed a significant amount of time due to injuries, missing over 35% of his first five seasons in the NHL.

On February 11, 2016, the Blue Jackets re-signed Murray to a two-year, $5.65 million contract. Injuries continued to reduce his playing time and, after missing nearly half the games in the 2017–18 NHL season, he signed a one-year qualifying offer from the Blue Jackets on July 14, 2018. On July 1, 2019, Murray signed a two-year, $9.2 million contract with the Blue Jackets.

==== New Jersey Devils ====
After seven seasons with the Blue Jackets, on October 8, 2020, Murray was traded to the New Jersey Devils in exchange for a 2021 fifth-round draft pick. In the shortened 2020–21 season, Murray registered 14 assists through 48 regular season games with the rebuilding Devils.

==== Colorado Avalanche ====
On August 2, 2021, as a free agent from the Devils, Murray was signed to a one-year, $2 million contract with the Colorado Avalanche. He began the 2021–22 season, placed in a third-pairing role with the Avalanche, making his debut on opening night in a 4-2 victory over the Chicago Blackhawks on October 13, 2021. He registered his first points with the Avalanche, recording 2 assists in a 4-3 win over the St. Louis Blues on October 28, 2021. He appeared in 17 out of 18 games with Colorado before suffering a lower body injury against the Nashville Predators on November 27, 2021.

==== Edmonton Oilers ====
Despite being on injured-reserve for the entire second half of the 2021–22 season, and missing the entire 2022 Stanley Cup Playoffs, Murray was given an exemption by the NHL allowing his name to be engraved with the Avalanche Stanley Cup-winning team. The Edmonton Oilers signed the free agent to a one-year, $750,000 contract on September 2, 2022. Murray's injury problem persisted, restricting him to only 13 games – all in the first 19 games of the 2022–23 Edmonton Oilers season – before ending up on long-term injured reserve for the remainder of the season and the 2023 Stanley Cup playoffs.

== International play ==
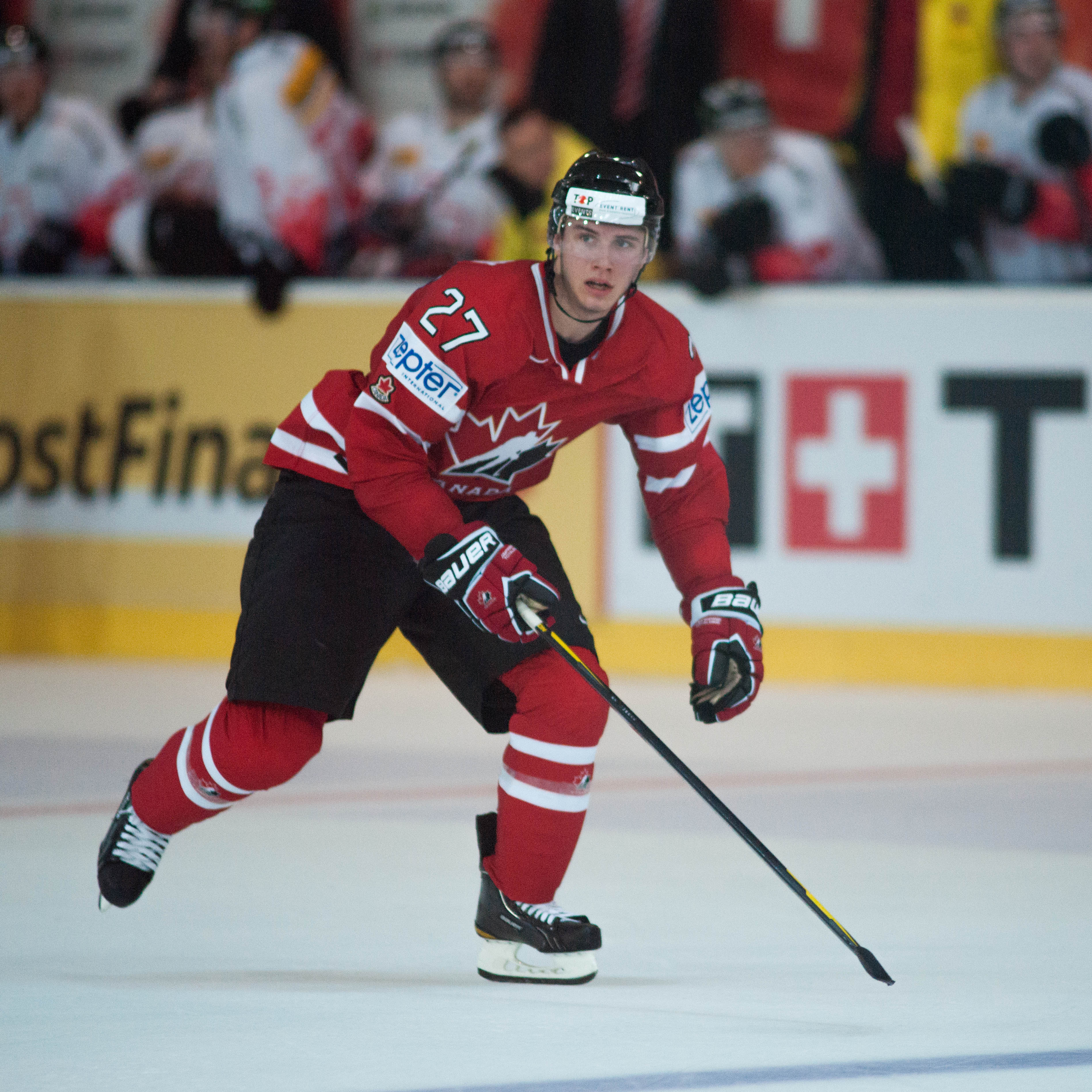
- Ryan Murray as a member of Team Canada at the 2012 IIHF World Championship.

Medal record

Representing Canada

Ice hockey

World Championships
Gold medal – first place	2016 Russia	

World Junior Championships
Bronze medal – third place	2012 Canada	

Murray participated at the 2012 World Junior Ice Hockey Championships held in Calgary and Edmonton and won the bronze medal.

In 2012, Murray became the first draft eligible player to represent Team Canada at the World Championship in many years. Murray became the second youngest Team Canada player to play in the tournament (the youngest was Paul Kariya in 1993). Four years later, Murray again played for Canada, winning gold at the 2016 World Championship. Murray was also named to Team Canada to compete at the 2018 IIHF World Championship.

== Career statistics ==
=== Regular season and playoffs ===
			Regular season					Playoffs
Season	Team	League	GP	G	A	Pts	PIM	GP	G	A	Pts	PIM
2008–09	Everett Silvertips	WHL	—	—	—	—	—	5	0	1	1	2
2009–10	Everett Silvertips	WHL	52	5	22	27	31	7	2	5	7	2
2010–11	Everett Silvertips	WHL	70	6	40	46	45	4	1	2	3	4
2011–12	Everett Silvertips	WHL	46	9	22	31	31	4	3	2	5	0
2012–13	Everett Silvertips	WHL	23	2	15	17	14	—	—	—	—	—
2013–14	Columbus Blue Jackets	NHL	66	4	17	21	10	5	0	1	1	0
2014–15	Columbus Blue Jackets	NHL	12	1	2	3	8	—	—	—	—	—
2015–16	Columbus Blue Jackets	NHL	82	4	21	25	40	—	—	—	—	—
2016–17	Columbus Blue Jackets	NHL	60	2	9	11	24	—	—	—	—	—
2017–18	Columbus Blue Jackets	NHL	44	1	11	12	8	6	0	1	1	2
2017–18	Cleveland Monsters	AHL	1	1	0	1	0	—	—	—	—	—
2018–19	Columbus Blue Jackets	NHL	56	1	28	29	10	—	—	—	—	—
2019–20	Columbus Blue Jackets	NHL	27	2	7	9	4	9	1	0	1	2
2020–21	New Jersey Devils	NHL	48	0	14	14	8	—	—	—	—	—
2021–22	Colorado Avalanche	NHL	37	0	4	4	2	—	—	—	—	—
2022–23	Edmonton Oilers	NHL	13	0	3	3	4	—	—	—	—	—
2022–23	Bakersfield Condors	AHL	2	0	0	0	0	—	—	—	—	—
NHL totals			445	15	116	131	118	20	1	2	3	4

=== International ===
Year	Team	Event	Result	GP	G	A	Pts	PIM
2010	Canada West	U17	8th	5	0	1	1	—
2010	Canada	U18	7th	6	0	0	0	2
2010	Canada	IH18	1st place, gold medalist(s)	5	0	2	2	2
2011	Canada	U18	4th	7	3	7	10	6
2012	Canada	WJC	3rd place, bronze medalist(s)	6	0	3	3	0
2012	Canada	WC	5th	6	0	0	0	0
2016	Canada	WC	1st place, gold medalist(s)	10	0	5	5	0
2016	Team North America	WCH	5th	3	0	0	0	0
2018	Canada	WC	4th	10	0	1	1	4
Junior totals				29	3	13	16	10
Senior totals				19	0	5	5	0

== Awards and honours ==
Award	Year
NHL
Stanley Cup champion	2022
International
U18 First Team All-Star	2011

Awards and achievements
Preceded by Ryan Johansen	Columbus Blue Jackets first-round draft pick 2012	Succeeded by Alexander Wennberg
