= Nico Sturm =

German ice hockey player (born 1995)

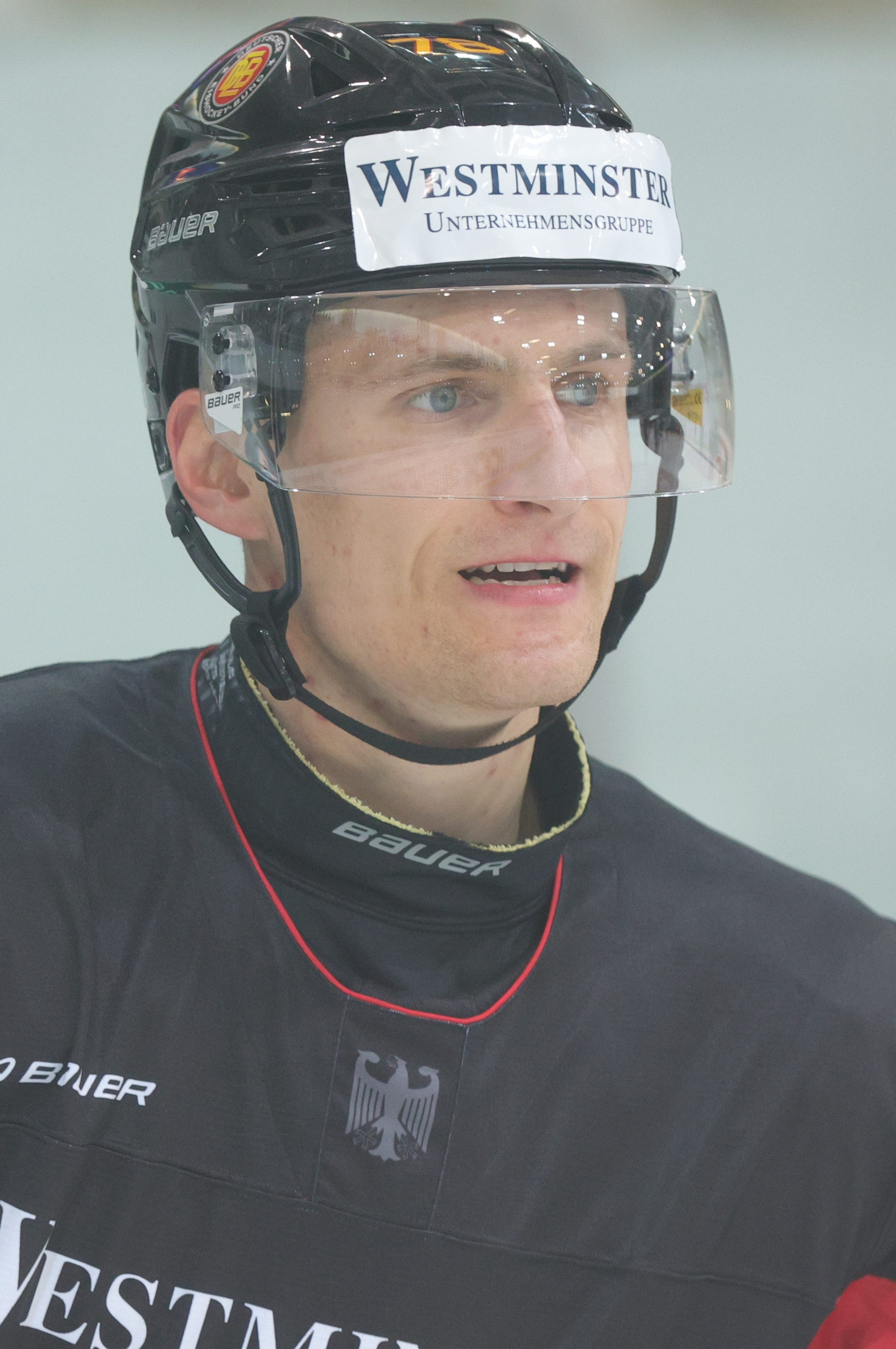
- Sturm with Germany during the 2024 IIHF World Championship
- Born: 3 May 1995 (age 31) Augsburg, Germany
- Height: 6 ft 3 in (191 cm)
- Weight: 209 lb (95 kg; 14 st 13 lb)
- Position: Forward
- Shoots: Left
- NHL team Former teams: Minnesota Wild; Colorado Avalanche; San Jose Sharks; Florida Panthers
- National team: Germany
- NHL draft: Undrafted
- Playing career: 2019–present

Nico Sturm (born 3 May 1995) is a German professional ice hockey player who is a forward for the Minnesota Wild of the National Hockey League (NHL). He previously played for the Colorado Avalanche, San Jose Sharks and Florida Panthers. He made his NHL debut in 2019 with the Wild, and won the Stanley Cup with the Avalanche in 2022 and the Panthers in 2025. Internationally Sturm has played for the German national team, and won a silver medal at the 2023 World Championships.

== Playing career ==
=== Amateur ===
Sturm played as a youth in his native Germany, appearing with ESV Kaufbeuren in the German Development League (DNL) from 2011 to 2014. In order to continue his development, Sturm opted to move to North America, playing in the North American Hockey League with the Corpus Christi IceRays and the Austin Bruins.

Sturm was selected by the Tri-City Storm, 72nd overall, in the 2015 USHL Entry Draft. On 30 June 2015, Sturm was announced to have signed with the Storm, while also committing to play collegiate hockey at Clarkson University of the ECAC.

In the 2015–16 season, Sturm recorded 39 points in 57 games with the Tri-City Storm and added 6 points in 5 playoff games to help Tri-City win the Clark Cup.

Sturm played his freshman season with the Clarkson University Golden Knights in the 2016–17 season, collecting 21 points in 38 games to earn a selection to the ECAC All-Rookie Team. In his second year, Sturm continued to realise his potential, increasing his offensive production with 37 points in 40 games. His solid two-way play was noticed as he led the NCAA with a 61.7% face-off win percentage and was named the 2017–18 ECAC Best Defensive Forward.

Returning as co-captain for his junior season with Clarkson in 2018–19, Sturm led the team in scoring and assists with 45 points in 39 games. In his standout season for the top ranked Golden Knights, he was named the ECAC Hockey Best Defensive Forward for the second consecutive season, a Top Ten Hobey Baker Award Finalist, a finalist for the ECAC Hockey Player of the Year Award, named to the 2019 ECAC Hockey All-Tournament Team and an ECAC First-Team All-League selection.

=== Professional ===
==== Minnesota Wild ====
As an undrafted free agent, Sturm attracted league wide NHL interest following his junior season, opting to forgo his senior year in signing a one-year, entry-level contract for the remainder of the 2018–19 season, with the Minnesota Wild on 1 April 2019. He immediately joined the out of contention Wild making his NHL debut in a 3–0 defeat to the Boston Bruins on 4 April 2019.

Sturm mostly played in the Wild's American Hockey League (AHL) affiliate, the Iowa Wild, in the 2019–20 season. He earned a call-up to the NHL during the season and recorded his first two NHL assists in a six-game stint with the Wild. When the season was suspended due to the COVID-19 pandemic, the Wild were admitted to a play-in round of the playoffs when the NHL resumed. Sturm would play in two games of the Wild's five-game series against the Vancouver Canucks, and scored his first NHL goal in game four against Jacob Markström.

==== Colorado Avalanche ====
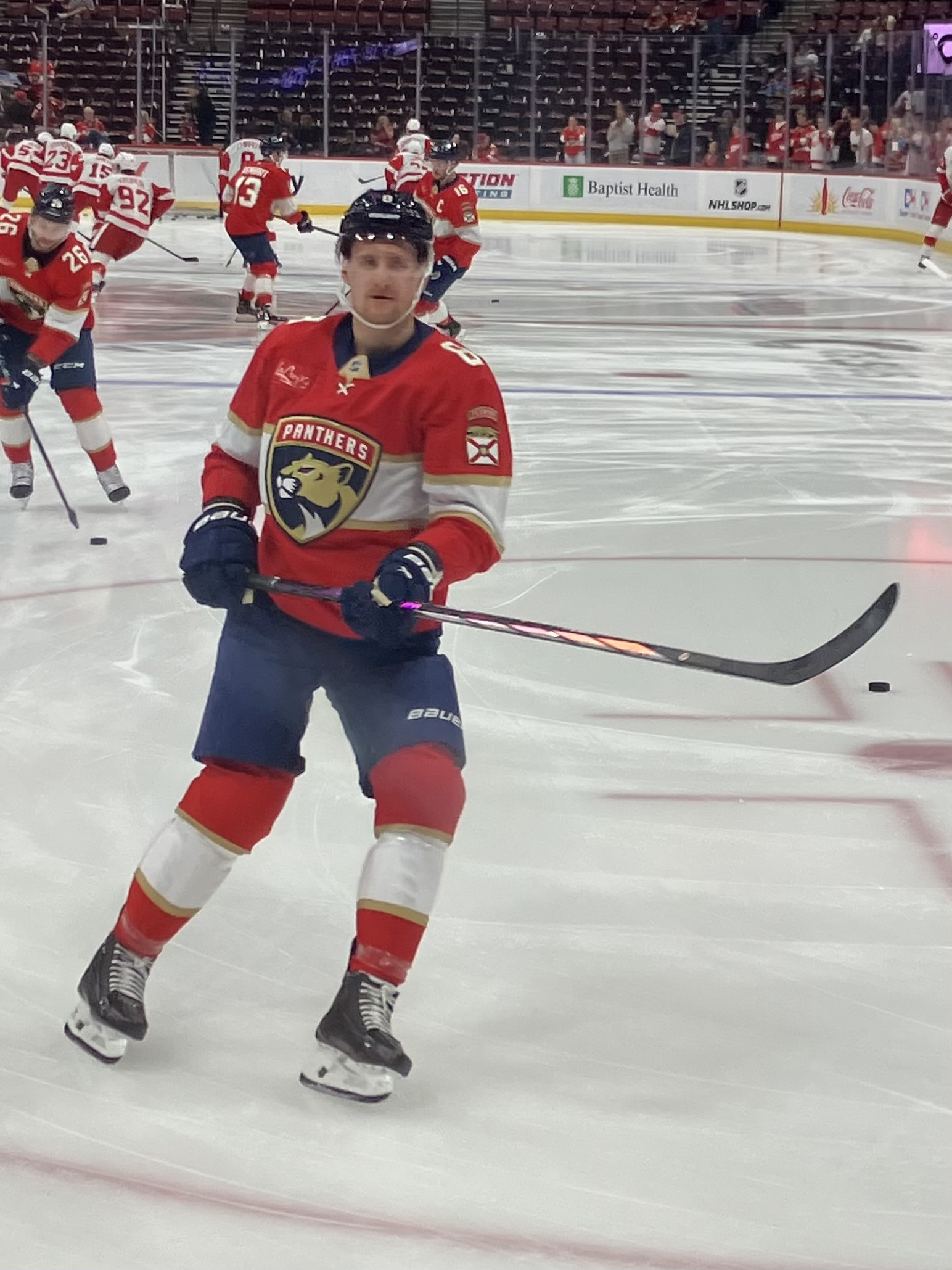
Sturm with the Panthers in 2025

On 15 March 2022, he was traded to the Colorado Avalanche, in exchange for Tyson Jost. On 26 June 2022, Sturm helped the Avalanche claim their first Stanley Cup in 21 years.

==== San Jose Sharks ====
On the back of his success with the Avalanche, Sturm as a free agent was signed to a three-year, $6 million contract with the San Jose Sharks on 13 July 2022.

==== Florida Panthers ====
During the 2024–25 season, approaching the end of his contract with the Sharks, Sturm was traded to the Florida Panthers on 6 March 2025, alongside a seventh-round draft pick in 2027, in exchange for a fourth-round draft pick in 2026. He only played in 15 regular season games and 8 playoff games. He was a healthy scratch in the entire Final. The Panthers went on to win the Stanley Cup. With the Panthers requesting an exemption, his name was engraved on the Stanley Cup, as he did not automatically qualify.

==== Return to Minnesota ====
Having concluded his contract with the Panthers, Sturm left as a free agent and was signed to a two-year, $4 million contract with his original club, the Minnesota Wild, on 1 July 2025. During the 2026-27 season, Strum was injured following an errant shot from captain Jared Spurgeon which struck him in the right side of the head near his ear, during the October 12 game against the Vegas Golden Knights. Strum was taken by ambulance to be evaluated at a local hospital under an abundance of caution following the injury to Brock Faber, who was struck in the head during a September preseason game.

== Personal life ==
Sturm is married to fellow Clarkson alum and professional hockey player Taylor Turnquist.

== Career statistics ==
=== Regular season and playoffs ===
			Regular season					Playoffs
Season	Team	League	GP	G	A	Pts	PIM	GP	G	A	Pts	PIM
2011–12	ESV Kaufbeuren	DNL	31	3	4	7	33	3	0	0	0	0
2012–13	ESV Kaufbeuren	DNL	33	11	22	33	22	—	—	—	—	—
2013–14	ESV Kaufbeuren	DNL	24	13	21	34	20	—	—	—	—	—
2013–14	Corpus Christi IceRays	NAHL	21	1	2	3	2	—	—	—	—	—
2014–15	Austin Bruins	NAHL	53	11	30	41	28	13	7	6	13	0
2015–16	Tri-City Storm	USHL	57	14	25	39	47	5	3	3	6	0
2016–17	Clarkson University	ECAC	39	8	13	21	37	—	—	—	—	—
2017–18	Clarkson University	ECAC	40	14	23	37	14	—	—	—	—	—
2018–19	Clarkson University	ECAC	39	14	31	45	29	—	—	—	—	—
2018–19	Minnesota Wild	NHL	2	0	0	0	0	—	—	—	—	—
2019–20	Minnesota Wild	NHL	6	0	2	2	0	2	1	0	1	0
2019–20	Iowa Wild	AHL	55	12	20	32	18	—	—	—	—	—
2020–21	Minnesota Wild	NHL	50	11	6	17	17	7	1	1	2	0
2021–22	Minnesota Wild	NHL	53	9	8	17	8	—	—	—	—	—
2021–22	Colorado Avalanche	NHL	21	0	3	3	6	13	0	2	2	2
2022–23	San Jose Sharks	NHL	74	14	12	26	23	—	—	—	—	—
2023–24	San Jose Sharks	NHL	63	5	8	13	12	—	—	—	—	—
2024–25	San Jose Sharks	NHL	47	7	6	13	13	—	—	—	—	—
2024–25	Florida Panthers	NHL	15	0	1	1	7	8	0	0	0	0
2025–26	Minnesota Wild	NHL	49	5	6	11	16	8	1	4	5	0
NHL totals			380	51	52	103	102	38	3	7	10	2

=== International ===
Medal record

Men's ice hockey

Representing Germany

World Championships
Silver medal – second place	2023 Finland/Latvia	

Year	Team	Event	Result	GP	G	A	Pts	PIM
2015	Germany	WJC	10th	6	0	0	0	12
2023	Germany	WC	2nd place, silver medalist(s)	10	6	2	8	2
2024	Germany	WC	6th	6	1	2	3	2
2026	Germany	OG	6th	5	1	0	1	0
Junior totals				6	0	0	0	12
Senior totals				21	8	4	12	4

== Awards and honours ==
Award	Year	Ref
USHL
Clark Cup champion	2016	
College
ECAC All-Rookie Team	2017	
ECAC Third All-Star Team	2018	
ECAC Best Defensive Forward	2018, 2019	
ECAC First All-Star Team	2019	
ECAC All-Tournament Team	2019	
East First All-American Team	2019	
NHL
Stanley Cup champion	2022, 2025	
