= Logan O'Connor =

American-Canadian ice hockey player (born 1996)

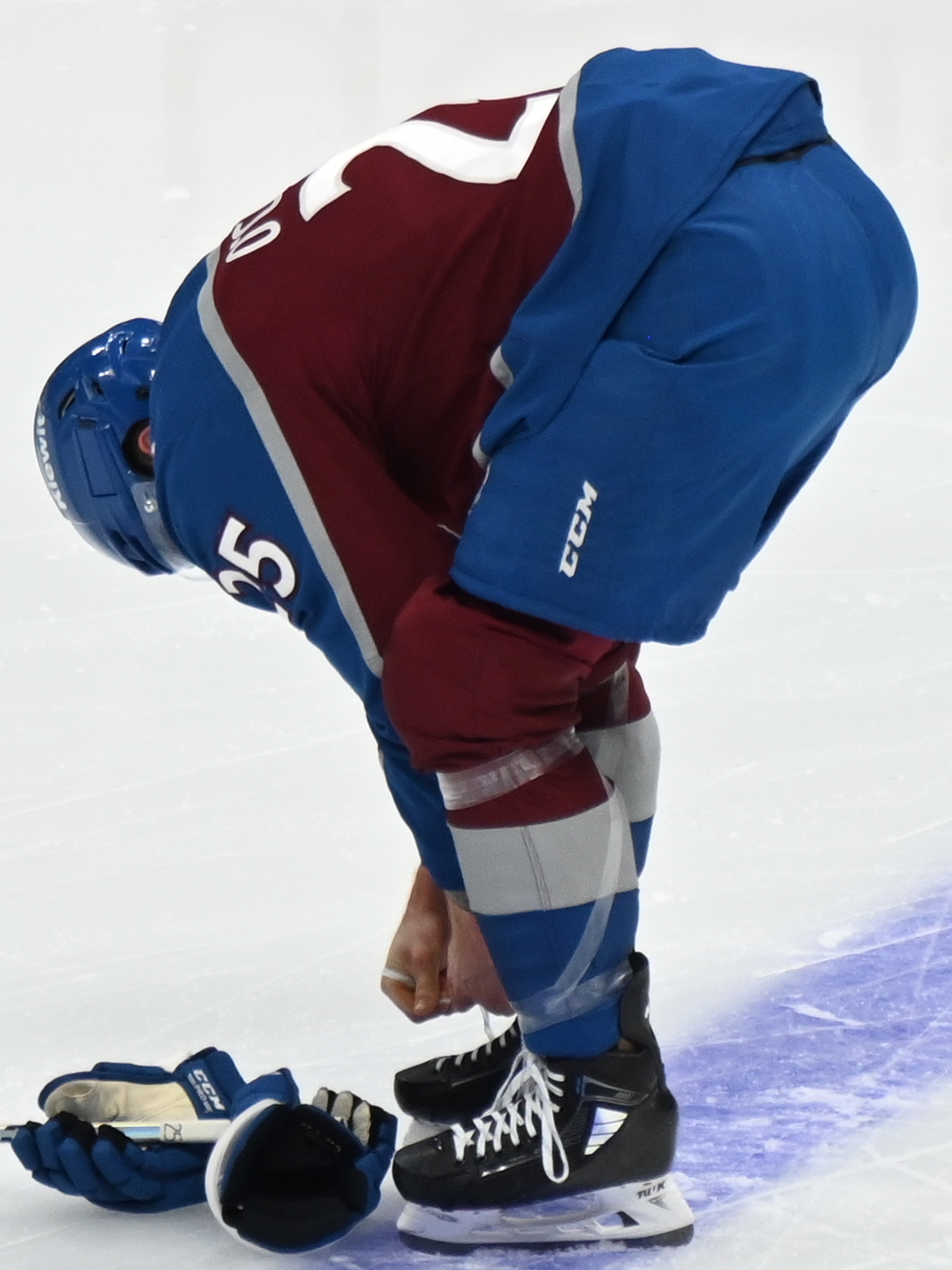
- O'Connor with the Colorado Avalanche in 2023
- Born: August 14, 1996 (age 29) Missouri City, Texas, U.S.
- Height: 6 ft 0 in (183 cm)
- Weight: 175 lb (79 kg; 12 st 7 lb)
- Position: Forward
- Shoots: Right
- NHL team: Colorado Avalanche
- NHL draft: Undrafted
- Playing career: 2018–present

Logan O'Connor (born August 14, 1996) is an American-born professional ice hockey player who is a forward for the Colorado Avalanche of the National Hockey League (NHL). O'Connor won the Stanley Cup with the Avalanche in 2022. He has become a fan favourite thanks to his gritty, hard-working style of play.

== Early life ==
O'Connor is the son of former NHL player Myles O'Connor and was born while his father played for the Houston Aeros of the International Hockey League (IHL). He was raised in Calgary, after his father retired from playing.

== Playing career ==
=== Amateur ===
O'Connor first played as a bantam and midget within the Calgary Royals organization of the Alberta Midget Hockey League (AMHL). Opting to pursue a collegiate career, O'Connor was selected with the 194th overall pick by the Sioux Falls Stampede in the 2013 United States Hockey League (USHL) Entry Draft.

During first junior season with the Stampede in the 2013–14 season, O'Connor committed to the University of Denver of the National Collegiate Hockey Conference (NCHC). As a 17-year-old with Sioux Falls, O'Connor was placed on the checking line and recorded 3 goals and 10 points in 59 games.

In the following 2014–15 season, O'Connor was named captain of the Stampede and continued his development by increasing his scoring presence in posting 16 goals and 36 points in 58 regular-season games. In the postseason, he contributed 10 points in 12 games for Sioux Falls to help capture the Clark Cup.

Embarking on his collegiate career with the Denver Pioneers in the 2015–16 season, O'Connor appeared in 23 games with two goals and two assists as a freshman. In the following 2016–17 season, he became a fixture among the Pioneers' checking line, registering 7 goals and 18 points while appearing in all 44 games to help Denver claim the 2017 national championship.

In his junior season in 2017–18, O'Connor again appeared every game with the Pioneers, posting a season-best 21 points while leading the Pioneers with two short-handed goals through 41 games. He helped the Pioneers claim the NCHC championship and was named to the All-Tournament Team. Named as a two-time All-Academic in the NCHC, O'Connor was selected as captain of the Pioneers for his senior season on June 7, 2018.

=== Colorado Avalanche ===
At the conclusion of his junior season and following the 2018 NHL entry draft, O'Connor was invited to attend the Colorado Avalanche development camp. On July 24, 2018, O'Connor forwent his senior season as captain with the Pioneers in agreeing to a two-year, entry-level contract as an undrafted free agent with the Avalanche.

O'Connor began the 2018–19 season with the Avalanche's American Hockey League (AHL) affiliate, the Colorado Eagles. On December 30, he was recalled by the Avalanche. O'Connor made his debut the following night in a 3–2 loss to the Los Angeles Kings. He finished the season with five scoreless appearances for the Avalanche and 42 points in 64 games for the Eagles.

On November 27, 2019, O'Connor scored his first career NHL goal in a 4–1 win over the Edmonton Oilers. He skated in 16 games for the Avalanche during the 2019–20 regular season, and also played in five 2020 playoff games, recording one assist.

On September 18, 2020, the Avalanche re-signed O'Connor to a two-year contract extension.

On September 22, 2021, the Avalanche re-signed O'Connor to a three-year, $3.15 million extension.

On May 21, 2022, O'Connor scored his first career playoff goal in a second-round game against the St. Louis Blues. He won a Stanley Cup when the Avalanche defeated the Tampa Bay Lightning in the 2022 Stanley Cup Final.

In October 2023, O'Connor scored a short-handed goal in three consecutive games, an extremely rare feat that only six other players in NHL history have accomplished, including Avalanche legend Joe Sakic. On January 20, 2024, O'Connor scored his first career hat trick against the Philadelphia Flyers. On March 10, he was declared out for the rest of the season after undergoing hip surgery to repair an injury that had forced him to miss six games since the All-Star Game break.

On June 6, 2025, he had hip surgery and was expected to be out 5–6 months. He returned to play on March 24 against the Pittsburgh Penguins, finishing the season having played in 13 games and earning two assists. In round one of the 2026 Stanley Cup playoffs, O'Connor scored his first goal in over a year, and the game-winning goal, during the second period of game one against the Los Angeles Kings.

== Career statistics ==
			Regular season					Playoffs
Season	Team	League	GP	G	A	Pts	PIM	GP	G	A	Pts	PIM
2012–13	Calgary Royals	AMHL	34	7	16	23	10	5	1	3	4	2
2013–14	Sioux Falls Stampede	USHL	59	3	7	10	23	3	0	0	0	12
2014–15	Sioux Falls Stampede	USHL	58	16	20	36	42	12	6	4	10	2
2015–16	University of Denver	NCHC	23	2	2	4	9	—	—	—	—	—
2016–17	University of Denver	NCHC	44	7	11	18	10	—	—	—	—	—
2017–18	University of Denver	NCHC	41	7	14	21	6	—	—	—	—	—
2018–19	Colorado Eagles	AHL	64	19	23	42	29	4	0	0	0	0
2018–19	Colorado Avalanche	NHL	5	0	0	0	0	—	—	—	—	—
2019–20	Colorado Eagles	AHL	40	12	13	25	28	—	—	—	—	—
2019–20	Colorado Avalanche	NHL	16	2	0	2	2	5	0	1	1	0
2020–21	Colorado Avalanche	NHL	22	3	2	5	6	2	0	0	0	0
2021–22	Colorado Avalanche	NHL	81	8	16	24	38	17	1	3	4	9
2022–23	Colorado Avalanche	NHL	82	9	17	26	37	7	0	0	0	6
2023–24	Colorado Avalanche	NHL	57	13	12	25	34	—	—	—	—	—
2024–25	Colorado Avalanche	NHL	80	10	11	21	26	7	2	4	6	16
2025–26	Colorado Avalanche	NHL	13	0	2	2	4	13	1	1	2	0
NHL totals			356	45	60	105	147	51	4	9	13	31

== Awards and honours ==
Award	Year	Ref
USHL
Clark Cup champion	2015	
College
NCAA champion	2017	
NCHC All-Academic Team	2017, 2018	
NCHC All-Tournament Team	2018	
NHL
Stanley Cup champion	2022	
