= Anthony Beauvillier =

Canadian ice hockey player (born 1997)

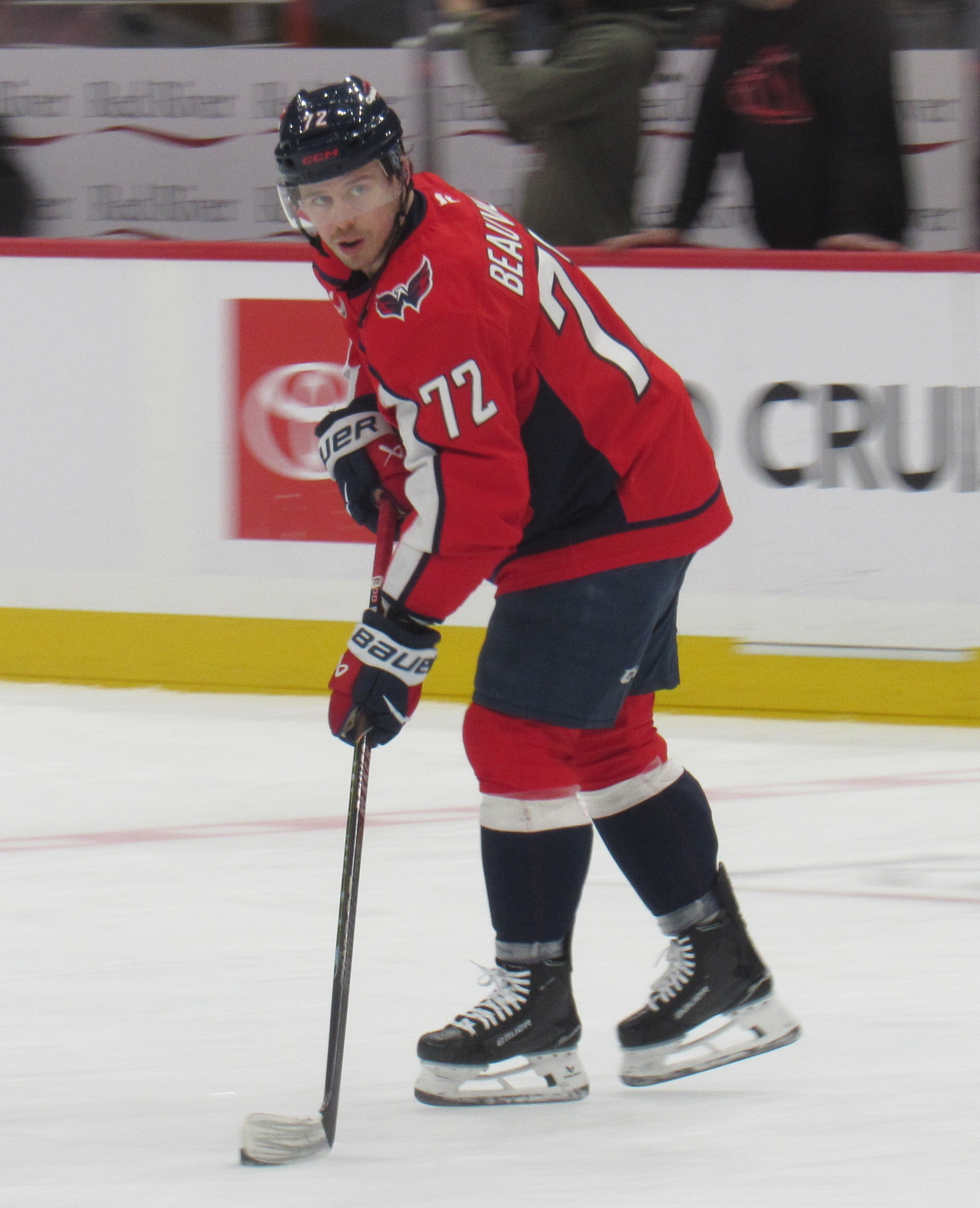
- Beauvillier with the Washington Capitals in 2026
- Born: June 8, 1997 (age 29) Sorel-Tracy, Quebec, Canada
- Height: 5 ft 11 in (180 cm)
- Weight: 181 lb (82 kg; 12 st 13 lb)
- Position: Forward
- Shoots: Left
- NHL team Former teams: Washington Capitals; New York Islanders; Vancouver Canucks; Chicago Blackhawks; Nashville Predators; Pittsburgh Penguins
- National team: Canada
- NHL draft: 28th overall, 2015; New York Islanders
- Playing career: 2016–present

Anthony Beauvillier (born June 8, 1997) is a Canadian professional ice hockey player who is a forward for the Washington Capitals of the National Hockey League (NHL).

Growing up in Quebec, Beauvillier played for the Shawinigan Cataractes of the Quebec Major Junior Hockey League (QMJHL) for three seasons. Following the 2014–15 season, he was selected to play in the 2015 CHL/NHL Top Prospects Game and named to the 2014–15 QMJHL Second All-Star Team. He was eventually drafted by the New York Islanders with the 28th overall pick in the 2015 NHL entry draft. After Beauvillier and the Cataractes fell to the Rouyn-Noranda Huskies in Game 5 of the 2016 President's Cup Final, Beauvillier turned professional with the Islanders organization and made his debut during the 2016–17 season. In January 2023, Beauvillier was traded to the Vancouver Canucks, where he spent parts of two seasons before subsequently playing for the Chicago Blackhawks, Nashville Predators, and Pittsburgh Penguins.

Beauvillier has also represented Canada internationally, including at the 2017 IIHF World Junior Championship. Internationally, Beauvillier has represented Canada at both the junior and senior levels. He won a gold medal at the 2014 Ivan Hlinka Memorial Tournament and finished 4th at the 2018 IIHF World Championship.

== Early life ==
Beauvillier was born on June 8, 1997, in Sorel-Tracy, Quebec, Canada. Although he grew up in Quebec, Beauvillier was a fan of the Boston Bruins, and specifically Brad Marchand and Patrice Bergeron. As he grew up speaking French, Beauvillier did not speak much English until he moved to Long Island to play for the New York Islanders.

== Playing career ==
=== Amateur ===
Growing up in Quebec, Beauvillier played in the 2009 Quebec International Pee-Wee Hockey Tournament with the Montreal Canadiens minor ice hockey team. He then played with the Collège Antoine-Girouard Gaulois in the Quebec Midget AAA Hockey League until 2013. During the 2012–13 season, had led the league in scoring with 39 goals in 41 games and received their MVP award. Following his dominant season, Beauvillier was drafted second overall by the Shawinigan Cataractes in the first round of the 2013 Quebec Major Junior Hockey League (QMJHL) entry draft. Beauvillier immediately joined the Cataractes for his rookie season during the 2013–14 season. The Cataractes began the season maintaining a 0–6–1 record through their first seven games, becoming the only club in the league to go without a win. Beauvillier scored his first major junior goal in a 4–1 loss to the Gatineau Olympiques on September 28, 2013. By November 6, the Cataractes held a 3–15–2 record. They continued to improve as the season continued and despite holding a 20–39–9 in March, they clinched the final playoff position for the QMJHL playoffs. Beauvillier finished with nine goals and 24 assists for 33 points through 64 games.

Beauvillier returned to the Cataractes for the 2014–15 season, where he experienced a breakout sophomore campaign. He began the season by tallying five points over two games to be named the QMJHL Second Star of the Week for the week ending on November 2. Beauvillier quickly surpassed his rookie points total as he accumulated 57 points through 42 games to rank ninth in league scoring. As a result of his outstanding play, he was selected to play in the 2015 CHL/NHL Top Prospects Game, where he led Team Cherry as captain. Following the announcement, he was honoured as the QMJHL's first star of the week for the week ending on January 15. He received this honour after he scored two goals and seven assists across three games. He was also recognized as the CHL Player of the Week. At the time of the honour, he had improved to 31 goals and 25 assists for 66 points through 45 games. After competing in the Top Prospects Game, Beauvillier and the Cataractes participated in the QMJHL's inaugural Winter Classic against the Victoriaville Tigres. During the Top Prospects Game, Beauvillier tallied one goal and three assists before picking up two goals and four assists throughout two outdoor games. During the Cataractes' 4–2 win over the Tigres, Beauvillier tallied his 100th career point in the QMJHL as he helped on all four goals. He subsequently finished the month as the QMJHL's Second Star of January as he accumulated 25 points through 11 games. Beauvillier's play earned him extra attention from hockey scouts and he was ranked 33rd amongst all North American players eligible for the 2015 NHL entry draft by the NHL Central Scouting Bureau. He was also named to the 2014–15 QMJHL Second All-Star Team. Beauvillier subsequently finished his sophomore season with 42 goals and 52 assists while being used in both offensive and defensive situations.

Beauvillier was eventually drafted in the first round, 28th overall, by the New York Islanders in the 2015 NHL entry draft. Following the draft, he replaced Félix-Antoine Bergeron as captain of the Cataractes. Upon returning from Team Canada's training camp, Beauvillier scored seven goals and eight assists through his first seven games of the 2015–16 season. Through his first nine games, he recorded eight goals and 10 assists for 14 points. His play earned him second star of the week honours for the period extending from October 12 to 18, 2015. On October 23, 2015, Beauvillier was signed to a three-year, entry-level contract by the Islanders. Following the signing, he tallied three more goals and one more assist for 25 points through 12 games. As his scoring prowess continued through early November, the Shawinigan never lost a game when he scored a goal. On November 16, Beauvillier was suspended for four games after delivering a hit to the head of Blainville-Boisbriand Armada defenceman Nathanael Halbert. At the time of the suspension, he had accumulated 16 goals and 18 assists through 17 games. His playing success earned him recognition from Team Canada and he was invited to their camp prior to the 2016 World Junior Ice Hockey Championships. At the time of the selection, Beauvillier had accumulated 16 goals and 19 assists for 35 points through 17 games. He was eventually named to Team Canada's final roster alongside fellow Islanders prospect Mathew Barzal. Upon returning from the tournament, Beauvillier continued to produce and he finished the regular season with 40 goals and 39 assists for 79 points through 74 games.

As Beauvillier and the Shawinigan Cataractes qualified for the 2016 QMJHL playoffs, they faced off against the Sherbrooke Phoenix in the first round. After losing the opening game, Beauvillier recorded five points to lift the Cataractes over the Phoenix to the second round against the Charlottetown Islanders. In the second round, Beauvillier scored nine points to advance to the semi-finals in six games. In the semi-finals, Beauvillier and the Shawinigan Cataractes eliminated the Saint John Sea Dogs in five games. He subsequently received the Cataractes' Offensive Player of the Year for his regular season and postseason scoring totals. Upon reaching the President's Cup Final, Beauvillier tallied 15 goals and 15 assists for 30 points through 21 games. Although he set career-highs in the postseason with 30 points, Beauvillier and the Shawinigan Cataractes fell to the Rouyn-Noranda Huskies in Game 5 of the President's Cup Final.

=== New York Islanders ===
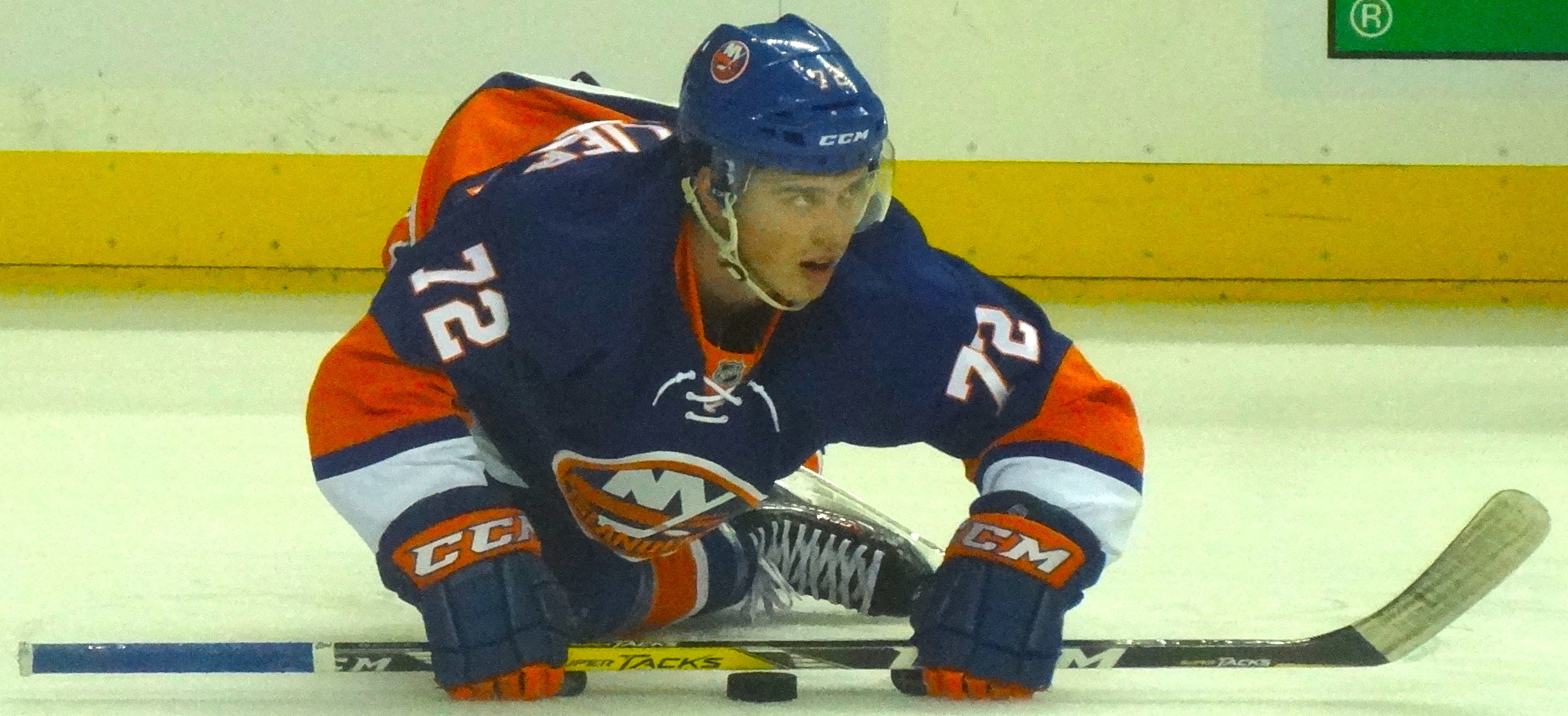
Beauvillier during his rookie season with the Islanders

Following the Cataractes elimination, Beauvillier joined the New York Islanders mini-camp in June 2016. His efforts during the mini-camp earned him invites to participate in their rookie camp and training camp. While competing with the Islanders in the 2016–17 preseason, Beauvillier earned praise from head coach Jack Capuano for his puck moving abilities, offensive instincts, and professionalism. Beauvillier and Barzal were eventually named to the Islanders' opening night roster for the 2016–17 season, resulting in Beauvillier becoming the youngest player on the roster at the age of 19. Due to his age, Beauvillier was too young to be assigned to the Islanders American Hockey League (AHL) affiliate. As such, he could only be assigned to Shawinigan if he was cut from the roster. Beauvillier made his NHL debut in their season opener on October 13, 2016, against the New York Rangers. Although the Islanders lost 5–3, he played 10:52 minutes of ice time and tallied his first NHL point, an assist. His first NHL goal came shortly after in a 3–2 loss to the San Jose Sharks on October 18. He subsequently became the youngest Islander since Nino Niederreiter to score a goal and the first player in Islander history to score his first NHL goal against a goaltender making their NHL debut. He accumulated one goal and four assists for five points through his first five NHL games.

After playing in his 10th NHL game, and thus burning the first year of his contract, coach Jack Capuano explained that he kept Beauvillier in the lineup because "he's played extremely well for us all season as a young player. He's done a great job and continues to play with pace and continues to do the things he's done since training camp to earn a spot on our roster." Although he began the season strong, Beauvillier was made a healthy scratch for numerous games throughout the months of November and December. He played in four of the Islanders' first six December games and averaged about 12 minutes of ice time. His scratches continued into January as he was scratch for five games before skating on January 13, where he recorded an assist and three shots on net while maintaining a plus-minus rating of +2. Due to the Islanders lacklustre performance, assistant general manager Doug Weight was named interim head coach midway through the 2016–17 season. Beauvillier ended the season with nine goals and 15 assists for 24 points through 66 games as the Islanders failed to qualify for the 2017 Stanley Cup playoffs.

Following his rookie season, the Islanders officially named Doug Weight as their head coach. Beauvillier again made the Islanders' opening night roster to begin the 2017–18 season. At the age of 20, he was again the youngest player on the team and one of three players 21 or younger on the Islanders roster. Beauvillier began his sophomore season on a much slower pace than his rookie season. Through his first 32 games, Beauvillier had four goals and three assists. After suffering an injury during a game against the Dallas Stars on November 10, Beauvillier missed one game to recover before rejoining the lineup. Due to his decreased production, Beauvillier was reassigned to the Islanders AHL affiliate, the Bridgeport Sound Tigers, for conditioning. He played two games with the Sound Tigers, recording two goals, and was recalled on January 7 for a game against the New Jersey Devils as an emergency replacement for Josh Bailey. After scoring a goal in the 5–4 shootout win, he returned to the AHL while the Islanders were on their five-day break. Beauvillier returned to the Islander's lineup full-time following their break and immediately contributed to the lineup by scoring eight goals in his next seven games. Beauvillier continued to produce as the season continued and earned a spot on the Islanders' second line alongside Jordan Eberle and Barzal. He finished the season with 21 goals, becoming the second Islanders player aged 20 or younger to break the 20-goal plateau.

Following the hiring of President and General Manager Lou Lamoriello, Beauvillier was forced to change his jersey number due to the manager's rule about high numbers. Beauvillier discovered that his number was changed to 18 upon entering the Islanders locker room and seeing his jersey. Due to the departure of John Tavares, new head coach Barry Trotz put Beauvillier on the top line with Barzal and Bailey. He moved Beauvillier to the top line due to his "natural chemistry with Barzal" and Bailey's high hockey IQ. However, Beauvillier ended up spending the majority of the season on a line with veterans Valtteri Filppula and Leo Komarov. The Islanders went 10–6–2 through their first 18 games while Beauvillier went scoreless from October 27 to November 15. He broke his scoreless streak by recording his first career NHL hat-trick on November 15 to help lift the Islanders to a 7–5 win over the New York Rangers. His hat-trick sparked his offensive prowess and he subsequently tallied seven points in his next five games. By his 200th NHL game on March 2, Beauvillier had recorded 15 goals and seven assists in 63 games. He scored twice on March 30, 2019, in a win over the Buffalo Sabres to help the Islanders qualify for the 2019 Stanley Cup playoffs. Beauvillier finished the regular season with 18 goals and 10 assists for 28 points through 81 games. As the Islanders met with the Pittsburgh Penguins in the Eastern Conference First Round, Beauvillier tallied his first playoff goal during their a 3–1 win in Game 2. Beauvillier finished the postseason with one goal and one assist through eight playoff games. On August 28, 2019, Beauvillier signed a two-year contract with the Islanders to remain with the team. Although the financial terms of the deal were not disclosed by the team, it was reported to pay him $2.1 million per season.

In the first year of his new contract, Beauvillier experienced a breakout season despite the 2019–20 NHL season being shortened due to the COVID-19 pandemic. He cited his mental approach and increased trust on the ice as the reason for his increased scoring. Upon making his season debut, Beauvillier became the second youngest Islander player for the first time in his career as he was nearly 31 months older than Noah Dobson. Beauvillier immediately showed off his scoring prowess by maintaining a three-game point streak to start the season while also leading the team with four points. His playing time also increased as he played 20:00 of ice-time for the third time in his career during a game against the St. Louis Blues on October 14. As a result of his consistency in scoring, Beauvillier played alongside Brock Nelson and Nick Leddy in high-intensity situations. By mid-October, he was third on the team with two goals and four assists for six points. However, as injuries plagued the Islanders roster, coach Trotz moved Derick Brassard to the wing alongside Beauvillier and Nelson in late October. The line immediately began developing chemistry as Brassard recorded a five-game goal streak while the Islanders maintained a 13-game point streak. While the Islanders underwent a hot streak, every member of Beauvillier's line produced offensively to maintain their winning record. By mid-November, Beauvillier had recorded his best start to a season by recording six goals and six assists through 19 games. He also saw increased ice time and earned significant time on both the power play and penalty kill. The Islanders point streak eventually ended on November 25 at a franchise-record 17 points in a regulation loss to the Anaheim Ducks. Beauvillier continued to produce through the second half of the season and he quickly matched his career high with 36 points by February 11, 2020. On the way to his career-high, Beauvillier maintained a six-game point streak over six games and 13 points over 10 games. When the NHL paused play due to the COVID-19 pandemic, Beauvillier had recorded 18 goals and a career-high 21 assists for 39 points. Part of his success was due to coach Trotz working individually with Beauvillier to establish a level of trust and responsibility in his designated role.

When the NHL resumed play for the 2020 Stanley Cup playoffs, Beauvillier and the Islanders faced off against the Florida Panthers in the newly created qualifying round. Beauvillier scored twice in Game 4 to lift the Islanders past the Panthers and into a berth in the NHL's 16-team playoffs. He consistently played on the Islanders second line alongside Nelson and Bailey against Florida. Beauvillier finished the qualifying round with three goals and two assists to lead the team. After besting the Panthers, Beauvillier and the Islanders won their First Round best-of-seven series over the Washington Capitals in Game 5. He scored two goals against the Capitals, including his first power play goal of the postseason, for nine points in six of his last nine games. Beauvillier also became the first Islanders player to score two game-winning goals in series clinchers since Mike Bossy. Following their Game 5 win, Beauvillier and the Islanders faced the Philadelphia Flyers in the Eastern Conference Second Round. As they beat the Flyers to qualify for the Eastern Conference Final for the first time in 27 years, Beauvillier tallied three points in the series. The Islanders would eventually fall to the Tampa Bay Lightning 2–1 in an overtime loss in Game 6. Beauvillier finished the playoffs with nine goals and five assists through 22 games. He credited his success to altering his mindset and taking pride in his role among his teammates.

In an effort to eventually resume a regularly scheduled season, the NHL implemented an abbreviated 56-game regular season for the 2020–21 campaign. Beauvillier was reunited with his playoff linemates, Nelson and Bailey, and they immediately made an impact during training camp. Upon entering his fifth season, Beauvillier had played 143 consecutive games for the Islanders. The line of Beauvillier, Nelson, and Bailey immediately made an impact in the regular season by combining on one goal in the Islanders 4–0 win over the Ranger during their season opener. This would prove to be his only point through his first five games before he was placed on injured reserve following a game against the New Jersey Devils. He subsequently missed seven games before returning to Islanders practice on February 12. Upon returning to the lineup, Beauvillier scored his first goal of the season in his 10th game to lead the Islanders over the Boston Bruins on February 25. He later tallied three assists in a game against the Rangers on April 20, marking the first time he reached this milestone in his NHL career. Both of his four-point games had also come against the Rangers. On May 1, Beauvillier scored two goals in another win over the New York Rangers to help the Islanders clinch a berth in the 2021 Stanley Cup playoffs. As he often played with his original linemates upon returning from injury, all three had productive regular seasons. Beauvillier finished with 15 goals, including a team-high, five game-winning goals, and 13 assists for 28 points.

Beauvillier and the Islanders faced off against the first-place Pittsburgh Penguins in the first round of the 2021 Stanley Cup playoffs, marking the second time in three years they met in the playoffs. He tallied three points in the Islanders' 5–3 win over the Penguins to help lift them to the second round against the Boston Bruins. Beauvillier led all Islanders forwards with 19:39 of ice-time throughout their series as they beat the Bruins in six games. Beauvillier and the Islanders then met with the Tampa Bay Lightning in the Stanley Cup Semifinals. During Game 6, Beauvillier scored the final goal at the Nassau Coliseum, his first in 10 games, in overtime to stave off elimination and force Game 7. They would eventually fall 1–0 in Game 7 as the Lightning went on to win back-to-back Stanley Cups. Beauvillier finished the postseason with 13 points, including a six-game point streak.

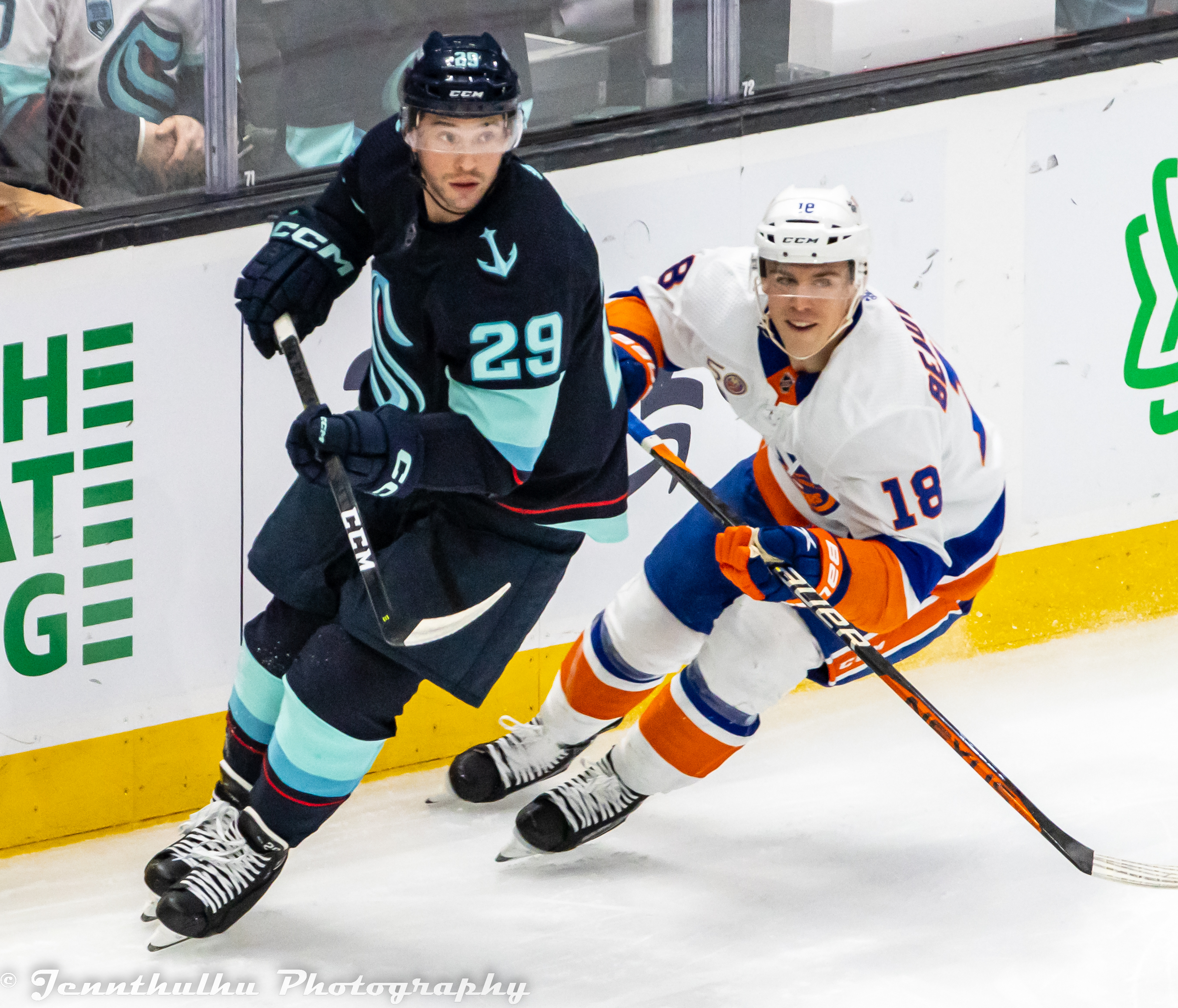
Anthony Beauvillier (right) during a game against the Seattle Kraken in 2023

On September 1, 2021, Beauvillier signed a three-year, $12.45 million contract with an average annual value of $4.15 million, to remain with the Islanders. After signing the contract, Beauvillier expressed his excitement about remaining with the team, saying: "I'm very excited to be here. There's nowhere else I'd rather play." Although he finished the 2021–2022 NHL season with 12 goals and 22 assists, his game was often derailed due to him entering the NHL's COVID-19 protocol. He first entered the protocol on November 20 but was activated the following day. At the time, Beauvillier was tied for third on the Islanders with seven points through 13 games. Beauvillier added one more point by his 24th game before entering the NHL's COVID-19 protocol on December 26. He was activated off the protocol list on January 1, 2022, and he scored in his first game back in a 3–2 win over the Edmonton Oilers. On March 24, Beauvillier set numerous franchise records by scoring a goal within the first nine seconds of their game against the Detroit Red Wings. His goal was the earliest in any Islander home game, surpassing John Tavares, and second fastest in franchise history behind Bryan Trottier. He later endured a nine-game scoring drought that was snapped in a loss to the Toronto Maple Leafs on April 17. The loss resulted in the Islanders failing to qualify for the 2022 Stanley Cup playoffs. Shortly after their elimination, Beauvillier suffered an upper-body injury but was not placed on injured reserve as he was considered day-to-day. He missed four games before returning to the lineup for a game against the Capitals on April 28 and playing 15:27 minutes of ice time. Beauvillier finished the season with 12 goals and 22 assists as a mainstay on the third line with Anders Lee and Nelson.

Beauvillier returned to the Islanders for his seventh season during the 2022–23 season. He tallied his 100th career assist on November 3, 2022, after helping on Ander Lee's goal during a game against the St. Louis Blues. Beauvillier later recorded his 200th career point with an assist on Nelson's goal during a 3–0 win over the Chicago Blackhawks on December 4. At the time of the milestone, Beauvillier had tallied five goals and six assists for 11 points through 25 games. A few games later, Beauvillier collided hard with the end boards during a 6–4 win over the New Jersey Devils. He returned to the game for one shift but left the remainder of the game. He missed two games before scoring in his return while playing on a line with Nelson and Josh Bailey. He also recorded three shots on net and played 14:07 minutes of ice time during their 5–4 loss to the Arizona Coyotes.

=== Vancouver Canucks ===
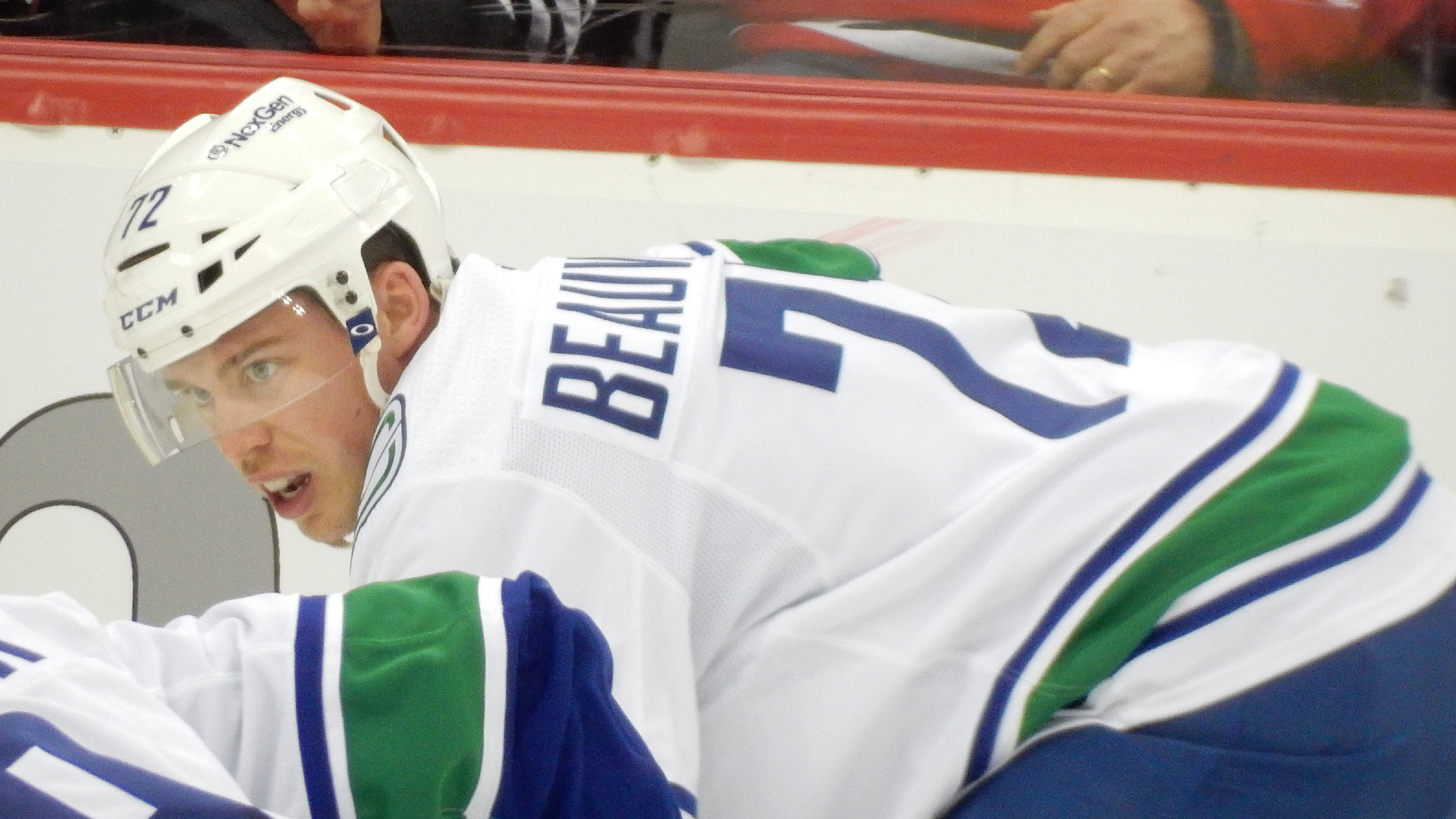
Beauvillier with the Vancouver Canucks in 2023

On January 30, 2023, Beauvillier was traded to the Vancouver Canucks along with Aatu Räty and a conditional first-round pick in the 2023 NHL entry draft for Bo Horvat. He immediately joined the Canucks lineup and scored his first goal with the team in a 6–5 win over his former team on February 9. Upon scoring his first goal with the Canucks, he became the third player in franchise history to have scored the game-winning goal in the first game they played against their former team after being acquired in a trade. Beauvillier scored 20 points through 33 games following the trade as he finished the regular-season with the Canucks.

=== Chicago Blackhawks ===
Beauvillier returned to the Canucks for the 2023–24 season but was traded to the Chicago Blackhawks on November 28, 2023, for a conditional fifth-round pick in the 2024 NHL entry draft. At the time of the trade, he had recorded eight points through 22 games. Beauvillier made his team debut on December 2 but was unable to play their following game against the Minnesota Wild due to visa issues. He appeared in 15 games with Chicago before suffering a wrist injury in January, which caused him to miss over a month of gameplay.

=== Nashville Predators ===
Beauvillier scored two goals and four assists through 23 games with Chicago before being traded to the Nashville Predators on March 7, 2024, in exchange for a fifth-round pick in the 2024 NHL entry draft. He scored his first assist with the team on March 20 to help the Predators match the longest point streak in franchise history.

=== Pittsburgh Penguins ===
As an unrestricted free agent for the first time in his career, Beauvillier signed a one-year, $1.25 million contract with the Pittsburgh Penguins on July 1, 2024. When speaking on the signing, Beauvillier said: "I feel like I'm in the right place mentally, and I have a lot of trust in my game right now." Following a strong showing at training camp, Beauvillier began the 2024–25 season on the Penguins top line alongside Sidney Crosby and Rickard Rakell. He spent his first 19 games of the season playing alongside either Crosby or Evgeni Malkin and was alternated between the two through January. By March, Beauvillier had scored 13 goals and 20 points through 63 games.

=== Washington Capitals ===
With the Penguins out of playoff contention, Beauvillier was traded to the Washington Capitals at the NHL trade deadline on March 7, 2025, in exchange for a 2025 second-round pick. Upon joining the Capitals, Beauvillier tallied five points while playing mostly on the fourth line with Brandon Duhaime and Nic Dowd. However, after Aliaksei Protas was injured in May, Beauvillier was promoted to the Capitals top line with Alex Ovechkin and Dylan Strome. In the 2025 Stanley Cup playoffs, he became the 4th player in franchise history to record a point in his first four playoff games with the team. After the Capitals were eliminated, he signed a two-year, $5.5 million contract extension on July 3, 2025. In the 2025–26 season, Beauvillier averaged 15:48 minutes per game while primarily playing on the top line with Ovechkin and Strome. He played in his 700th NHL game on March 18, 2026, againt the Ottawa Senators. Beauvillier credited John Tavares, Andrew Ladd and Josh Bailey as players who helped him reach this milestone. He finished the season with 15 goals and 13 assists for 28 points.

== International play ==
Beauvillier has represented Canada on the international stage at both junior and senior levels. He first competed with the Canada Quebec team at the 2014 World U-17 Hockey Challenge in January. Although they failed to win a medal, Beauvillier tallied two goals and two assists for four points through six games while also serving as an alternate captain. Following this tournament, he was selected to represent Canada men's national under-18 ice hockey team for the first time as they competed at the 2014 Ivan Hlinka Memorial Tournament. After winning gold at the tournament, he won bronze at the 2015 IIHF World U18 Championships with Team Canada. On December 1, 2015, Beauvillier was invited to the Team Canada selection camp for the 2016 World Junior Ice Hockey Championships. He was eventually named to Team Canada's final roster alongside fellow Islanders prospect Mathew Barzal. Beauvillier finished the tournament with one goal in five games as Canada failed to medal.

Beauvillier made his senior level debut with Team Canada at the 2018 World Championships. However, they failed to medal after falling to Team Switzerland in their semifinal match.

== Personal life ==
Beauvillier's older brother Francis also played ice hockey and they briefly played together for the Shawinigan Cataractes during the 2013–14 season. Francis was drafted by the Florida Panthers in the sixth round of the 2012 NHL entry draft and last played for the Thetford Assurancia in the Ligue Nord-Américaine de Hockey.

Outside of hockey, Beauvillier helps to raise money and awareness for Alzheimer's after his maternal grandparents were diagnosed and subsequently died from the disease. In 2018, Beauvillier helped organize the first Spike for Alz charity Spikeball tournament, which raised over $10K worth of donations in its debut. Following its second event, he received a certificate from the Alzheimer's Society of Montreal for his efforts. While with the Islanders, Beauvillier donated $100 to the Long Island chapter of the Alzheimer’s Association at each home game and met with impacted family members following the game.

== Career statistics ==
=== Regular season and playoffs ===
			Regular season					Playoffs
Season	Team	League	GP	G	A	Pts	PIM	GP	G	A	Pts	PIM
2013–14	Shawinigan Cataractes	QMJHL	64	9	24	33	26	4	0	0	0	8
2014–15	Shawinigan Cataractes	QMJHL	67	42	52	94	72	7	2	5	7	14
2015–16	Shawinigan Cataractes	QMJHL	47	40	39	79	57	21	15	15	30	16
2016–17	New York Islanders	NHL	66	9	15	24	10	—	—	—	—	—
2017–18	New York Islanders	NHL	71	21	15	36	16	—	—	—	—	—
2017–18	Bridgeport Sound Tigers	AHL	3	2	0	2	0	—	—	—	—	—
2018–19	New York Islanders	NHL	81	18	10	28	8	8	1	1	2	0
2019–20	New York Islanders	NHL	68	18	21	39	15	22	9	5	14	10
2020–21	New York Islanders	NHL	47	15	13	28	12	19	5	8	13	4
2021–22	New York Islanders	NHL	75	12	22	34	12	—	—	—	—	—
2022–23	New York Islanders	NHL	49	9	11	20	10	—	—	—	—	—
2022–23	Vancouver Canucks	NHL	33	9	11	20	14	—	—	—	—	—
2023–24	Vancouver Canucks	NHL	22	2	6	8	4	—	—	—	—	—
2023–24	Chicago Blackhawks	NHL	23	2	4	6	2	—	—	—	—	—
2023–24	Nashville Predators	NHL	15	1	2	3	2	6	1	1	2	2
2024–25	Pittsburgh Penguins	NHL	63	13	7	20	14	—	—	—	—	—
2024–25	Washington Capitals	NHL	18	2	3	5	0	10	2	4	6	2
2025–26	Washington Capitals	NHL	82	15	13	28	30	—	—	—	—	—
NHL totals			713	146	153	299	149	65	18	19	37	18

=== International ===
Year	Team	Event	Result	GP	G	A	Pts	PIM
2014	Canada Quebec	U17	4th	6	2	2	4	6
2014	Canada	IH18	1st place, gold medalist(s)	3	0	0	0	0
2015	Canada	U18	3rd place, bronze medalist(s)	6	3	0	3	2
2016	Canada	WJC	6th	5	1	0	1	2
2018	Canada	WC	4th	9	2	1	3	10
Junior totals				20	6	2	8	10
Senior totals				9	2	1	3	10

== Awards and honours ==
Award	Year	Ref
QMJHL
CHL/NHL Top Prospects Game (Team Cherry captain)	2015	
QMJHL Second All-Star Team	2014–15	

Awards and achievements
Preceded by Mathew Barzal	New York Islanders first round pick 2015	Succeeded by Kieffer Bellows
