= 2021 Stanley Cup playoffs =

2021 NHL Postseason Tournament

Tournament details
- Dates: May 15 – July 7, 2021
- Teams: 16
- Defending champions: Tampa Bay Lightning

Final positions
- Champions: Tampa Bay Lightning
- Runners-up: Montreal Canadiens

Tournament statistics
- Scoring leader(s): Nikita Kucherov (Lightning) (32 points)

Awards
- MVP: Andrei Vasilevskiy (Lightning)

The 2021 Stanley Cup playoffs was the playoff tournament of the National Hockey League (NHL) for the 2020–21 season. The playoffs began on May 15, 2021, and concluded on July 7, 2021, with the Tampa Bay Lightning winning their second consecutive and third overall Stanley Cup in franchise history, defeating the Montreal Canadiens four games to one in the Stanley Cup Final. The playoffs were originally scheduled to begin a few days after the regular season concluded, but they began four days prior to the end of the shortened regular season after the Vancouver Canucks had eleven games postponed because of a COVID-19 outbreak.

The league returned to the traditional 16-team playoff format with all series being best-of-seven, after using a 24-team format in 2020 due to the regular season being cut short by the COVID-19 pandemic. Due to cross-border travel restrictions imposed by the Government of Canada, the league temporarily realigned this season into four divisions with no conferences. Consequently, the first two rounds of the playoffs featured intra-divisional matchups, with the higher seeded teams receiving home-ice advantage in those rounds. In the Stanley Cup semifinals, the four remaining teams (one from each division) were reseeded based on their regular season records. Both semifinal winners advanced to the Stanley Cup Final. After initially stating that the Campbell and Wales trophies would not be awarded this season, the league decided in June 2021 that the Montreal Canadiens and Vegas Golden Knights would play for the Campbell Bowl and the New York Islanders and Tampa Bay Lightning would play for the Wales Trophy.

Although it was initially unknown whether the Canadian teams that qualified for the playoffs would be able to play in their home arenas after the second round, on June 6, it was announced that those teams would be allowed to play in their home arenas for the remainder of the playoffs. In order to complete the playoffs in Canada, the League applied for a cross-border travel exemption with the Public Health Agency of Canada. Prior to the announcement, there were some ideas of the Canadian team playing in a neutral NHL city in the US after the second round.

The Colorado Avalanche made the playoffs as the Presidents' Trophy winners with the most points (i.e. best record) during the regular season. The Pittsburgh Penguins increased their postseason appearance streak to 15 seasons. This became the longest active streak in the four major North American professional sports after the NBA's San Antonio Spurs missed the playoffs for the first time in 22 years. For the second year in a row and third time overall since 1996, all California-based teams, the Anaheim Ducks, Los Angeles Kings, and San Jose Sharks, missed the playoffs. For the first time since 1966, every team that qualified for the playoffs was also in the previous year's postseason. With all of the Canadian-based NHL teams in one division, the format for this season ensured that there would be a second round series between two Canadian-based teams for the first time since 2002.

For the first time since 1992, three of the previous year's semifinalists, the New York Islanders, Tampa Bay Lightning and Vegas Golden Knights, returned to the round for a second consecutive season.

== Playoff seeds ==
The top four teams in each of the four realigned divisions made the playoffs; this was the first time since 1993 that this format had been used.

The following teams qualified for the playoffs:

=== Central Division ===
1. Carolina Hurricanes, Central Division champions – 80 points
2. Florida Panthers – 79 points
3. Tampa Bay Lightning – 75 points
4. Nashville Predators – 64 points

=== East Division ===
1. Pittsburgh Penguins, East Division champions – 77 points (29 RWs, 34 ROWs)
2. Washington Capitals – 77 points (29 RWs, 33 ROWs)
3. Boston Bruins – 73 points
4. New York Islanders – 71 points

=== North Division ===
1. Toronto Maple Leafs, North Division champions – 77 points
2. Edmonton Oilers – 72 points
3. Winnipeg Jets – 63 points
4. Montreal Canadiens – 59 points

=== West Division ===
1. Colorado Avalanche, West Division champions, Presidents' Trophy winners – 82 points (35 RWs)
2. Vegas Golden Knights – 82 points (30 RWs)
3. Minnesota Wild – 75 points
4. St. Louis Blues – 63 points

== Playoff bracket ==
In each round, teams competed in a best-of-seven series following a 2–2–1–1–1 format (scores in the bracket indicate the number of games won in each best-of-seven series). The team with home ice advantage played at home for games one and two (and games five and seven, if necessary), and the other team was at home for games three and four (and game six, if necessary). The top four teams in each division made the playoffs.

In the first round, the fourth seeded team in each division played against the division winner from their division. The other series matched the second and third place teams from the divisions. In each round, home ice advantage was awarded to the team that had the better regular season record. Teams advancing to the Stanley Cup semifinals were re-seeded one through four based on regular season record.

First round
C1	Carolina	4
C4	Nashville	2
Central Division
C2	Florida	2
C3	Tampa Bay	4
E1	Pittsburgh	2
E4	NY Islanders	4
East Division
E2	Washington	1
E3	Boston	4
N1	Toronto	3
N4	Montreal	4
North Division
N2	Edmonton	0
N3	Winnipeg	4
W1	Colorado	4
W4	St. Louis	0
West Division
W2	Vegas	4
W3	Minnesota	3

Second round
C1	Carolina	1
C3	Tampa Bay	4
E4	NY Islanders	4
E3	Boston	2
N4	Montreal	4
N3	Winnipeg	0
W1	Colorado	2
W2	Vegas	4

Stanley Cup semifinals
1	Vegas	2
4	Montreal	4
2	Tampa Bay	4
3	NY Islanders	3

Stanley Cup Final
4	Montreal	1
2	Tampa Bay	4

Legend

- C1, C2, C3, C4 – The teams from the Central Division
- E1, E2, E3, E4 – The teams from the East Division
- N1, N2, N3, N4 – The teams from the North Division
- W1, W2, W3, W4 – The teams from the West Division

== First round ==
=== Central Division first round ===
==== (C1) Carolina Hurricanes vs. (C4) Nashville Predators ====
The Carolina Hurricanes finished first in the Central Division earning 80 points. Nashville finished as the fourth seed in the Central Division, earning 64 points. This was the first playoff meeting between these two teams. Carolina won six of eight games in this year's regular season series.

The Hurricanes defeated the Predators in six games. Hurricanes captain Jordan Staal scored twice in game one to give Carolina a 5–2 victory. In game two, Alex Nedeljkovic made 32 saves for the Hurricanes in a 3–0 shutout victory. Back in Nashville for game three, Juuse Saros stopped 52 shots and Matt Duchene scored at 14:54 of double-overtime for the Predators to emerge victorious 5–4. In game four, Juuse Saros made 58 saves for the Predators, defeating the Hurricanes 3–2 in double-overtime on Luke Kunin's snap shot goal. The Hurricanes forced overtime in game five, and in the extra period, Jordan Staal scored during a 4-on-4 to defeat the Predators 3–2 and take a 3–2 series lead. In game six, the Hurricanes overcame a two-goal deficit to force overtime, where Sebastian Aho scored on a deflected shot to send Carolina to the second round.

May 17	Nashville Predators	2–5	Carolina Hurricanes	PNC Arena	Recap
Filip Forsberg (1) – 12:14		First period	13:41 – Teuvo Teravainen (1)
Erik Haula (1) – 08:41		Second period	04:19 – Jordan Staal (1)
No scoring		Third period	02:26 – Nino Niederreiter (1); 08:00 – Jordan Staal (2); 18:13 – en – Andrei Svechnikov (1)
Juuse Saros 33 saves / 37 shots		Goalie stats	Alex Nedeljkovic 22 saves / 24 shots

May 19	Nashville Predators	0–3	Carolina Hurricanes	PNC Arena	Recap
No scoring		First period	08:03 – pp – Sebastian Aho (1)
No scoring		Second period	No scoring
No scoring		Third period	19:07 – en – Sebastian Aho (2); 19:32 – Warren Foegele (1)
Juuse Saros 28 saves / 30 shots		Goalie stats	Alex Nedeljkovic 32 saves / 32 shots

May 21	Carolina Hurricanes	4–5	2OT	Nashville Predators	Bridgestone Arena	Recap
Sebastian Aho (3) – 15:44		First period		04:35 – Ryan Ellis (1); 19:35 – Filip Forsberg (2)
Jordan Staal (3) – 03:31; Vincent Trocheck (1) – pp – 12:46		Second period		14:42 – pp – Mikael Granlund (1)
Brett Pesce (1) – 16:39		Third period		05:01 – Ryan Johansen (1)
No scoring		Second overtime period		14:54 – Matt Duchene (1)
Alex Nedeljkovic 49 saves / 54 shots		Goalie stats		Juuse Saros 52 saves / 56 shots

May 23	Carolina Hurricanes	3–4	2OT	Nashville Predators	Bridgestone Arena	Recap
Vincent Trocheck (2) – 18:03		First period		00:57 – Luke Kunin (1)
Brock McGinn (1) – 18:05		Second period		04:53 – Ryan Johansen (2)
Brock McGinn (2) – 00:13		Third period		03:15 – pp – Nick Cousins (1)
No scoring		Second overtime period		16:10 – Luke Kunin (2)
Alex Nedeljkovic 39 saves / 43 shots		Goalie stats		Juuse Saros 58 saves / 61 shots

May 25	Nashville Predators	2–3	OT	Carolina Hurricanes	PNC Arena	Recap
Yakov Trenin (1) – 11:44		First period		14:21 – pp – Martin Necas (1)
Yakov Trenin (2) – 00:53		Second period		No scoring
No scoring		Third period		12:55 – Martin Necas (2)
No scoring		First overtime period		02:03 – Jordan Staal (4)
Juuse Saros 34 saves / 37 shots		Goalie stats		Alex Nedeljkovic 23 saves / 25 shots

May 27	Carolina Hurricanes	4–3	OT	Nashville Predators	Bridgestone Arena	Recap
Brock McGinn (3) – 04:21		First period		01:44 – Nick Cousins (2)
Sebastian Aho (4) – pp – 13:34		Second period		01:13 – Mikael Granlund (2); 07:32 – pp – Ryan Johansen (3)
Dougie Hamilton (1) – 13:59		Third period		No scoring
Sebastian Aho (5) – 01:06		First overtime period		No scoring
Alex Nedeljkovic 24 saves / 27 shots		Goalie stats		Juuse Saros 27 saves / 31 shots

Carolina won series 4–2

==== (C2) Florida Panthers vs. (C3) Tampa Bay Lightning ====
The Florida Panthers finished second in the Central Division with 79 points. The Tampa Bay Lightning earned 75 points to finish third in the Central Division. This was the first playoff meeting between these two rivals. Florida won five of eight games in this year's regular season series. This was also the first postseason match-up between two Florida-based professional sports teams since the National Football League's 1999 AFC Divisional playoffs where the Jacksonville Jaguars defeated the Miami Dolphins.

The Lightning defeated the Panthers in six games. Upon his return from hip surgery in game one, Tampa Bay forward Nikita Kucherov scored twice and Brayden Point, on a breakaway attempt, scored with 1:14 left in the game to give the Lightning a 5–4 victory. In game two, Lightning goaltender Andrei Vasilevskiy made 32 saves for Tampa Bay as they defeated Florida 3–1 to take a 2–0 series lead. In game three, the Panthers gave up five goals in the second period; however, after a goalie change, Florida forced overtime where Ryan Lomberg scored to end the game 6–5 for the Panthers. The goaltending woes of the Panthers continued in game four when Sergei Bobrovsky allowed five goals on fourteen shots giving the Lightning a 3–1 series lead after a 6–2 rout. In game five, Florida opted to start rookie goaltender Spencer Knight whose 36 saves paid dividends for the Panthers in a 4–1 victory and extending a sixth game. Vasilevskiy held the fort for the Lightning in game six, posting a 29–save shutout in a 4–0 victory, advancing his team to the Second Round.

May 16	Tampa Bay Lightning	5–4	Florida Panthers	BB&T Center	Recap
Blake Coleman (1) – sh – 07:42		First period	09:41 – pp – Aleksander Barkov (1); 16:31 – Carter Verhaeghe (1)
Nikita Kucherov (1) – pp – 04:58; Nikita Kucherov (2) – pp – 14:51		Second period	No scoring
Brayden Point (1) – pp – 13:00; Brayden Point (2) – 18:46		Third period	01:27 – Jonathan Huberdeau (1); 04:09 – Owen Tippett (1)
Andrei Vasilevskiy 35 saves / 39 shots		Goalie stats	Sergei Bobrovsky 35 saves / 40 shots

May 18	Tampa Bay Lightning	3–1	Florida Panthers	BB&T Center	Recap
Steven Stamkos (1) – 04:52; Ondrej Palat (1) – 14:57		First period	No scoring
No scoring		Second period	14:21 – Mason Marchment (1)
Yanni Gourde (1) – en – 18:35		Third period	No scoring
Andrei Vasilevskiy 32 saves / 33 shots		Goalie stats	Chris Driedger 26 saves / 28 shots

May 20	Florida Panthers	6–5	OT	Tampa Bay Lightning	Amalie Arena	Recap
Sam Bennett (1) – 04:31; Radko Gudas (1) – 07:05		First period		No scoring
Alexander Wennberg (1) – pp – 12:34		Second period		01:57 – Anthony Cirelli (1); 05:46 – Ross Colton (1); 08:38 – Steven Stamkos (2); 14:17 – pp – Brayden Point (3); 18:17 – pp – Alex Killorn (1)
Patric Hornqvist (1) – pp – 01:45; Gustav Forsling (1) – 16:53		Third period		No scoring
Ryan Lomberg (1) – 05:56		First overtime period		No scoring
Chris Driedger 17 saves / 22 shots Sergei Bobrovsky 9 saves / 9 shots		Goalie stats		Andrei Vasilevskiy 41 saves / 47 shots

May 22	Florida Panthers	2–6	Tampa Bay Lightning	Amalie Arena	Recap
Jonathan Huberdeau (2) – pp – 08:49		First period	03:00 – Anthony Cirelli (2); 07:24 – Yanni Gourde (2); 16:45 – Ondrej Palat (2)
Carter Verhaeghe (2) – pp – 18:45		Second period	05:41 – pp – Alex Killorn (2); 07:15 – Alex Killorn (3)
No scoring		Third period	04:47 – pp – Nikita Kucherov (3)
Sergei Bobrovsky 9 saves / 14 shots Chris Driedger 11 saves / 12 shots		Goalie stats	Andrei Vasilevskiy 39 saves / 41 shots

May 24	Tampa Bay Lightning	1–4	Florida Panthers	BB&T Center	Recap
Ross Colton (2) – 00:53		First period	No scoring
No scoring		Second period	06:19 – MacKenzie Weegar (1); 16:55 – Mason Marchment (2)
No scoring		Third period	00:35 – pp – Patric Hornqvist (2); 19:45 – en – Frank Vatrano (1)
Andrei Vasilevskiy 34 saves / 37 shots		Goalie stats	Spencer Knight 36 saves / 37 shots

May 26	Florida Panthers	0–4	Tampa Bay Lightning	Amalie Arena	Recap
No scoring		First period	06:16 – Patrick Maroon (1)
No scoring		Second period	13:27 – pp – Steven Stamkos (3)
No scoring		Third period	14:36 – Brayden Point (4); 18:18 – en – Alex Killorn (4)
Spencer Knight 20 saves / 23 shots		Goalie stats	Andrei Vasilevskiy 29 saves / 29 shots

Tampa Bay won series 4–2

=== East Division first round ===
==== (E1) Pittsburgh Penguins vs. (E4) New York Islanders ====
The Pittsburgh Penguins finished first in the East Division earning 77 points, winning the tiebreaker against Washington with 34 ROWs. The New York Islanders earned 71 points to finish fourth in the East Division. This was the sixth playoff meeting between these two teams, with New York winning four of the five previous series. They last met in the 2019 Eastern Conference first round, which New York won in a four-game sweep. Pittsburgh won six of eight games in this year's regular season series.

The Islanders defeated the Penguins in six games. In game one, with Semyon Varlamov out as goaltender for New York, Ilya Sorokin stepped in and made 39 saves for the Islanders, defeating Pittsburgh in overtime on Kyle Palmieri's goal. Tristan Jarry made 37 saves for the Penguins in game two who emerged victorious by the score of 2–1. The Islanders attempted a rally in the third period of game three after being down by two goals. The comeback was spoiled at 16:24 when Penguins forward Brandon Tanev scored to make it 5–4. The Islanders played defensively in game four with Sorokin stopping 29 shots in a 4–1 victory, tying the series 2–2. In game five, heading into double-overtime, Josh Bailey scored 51 seconds into the period for the Islanders to give his team a 3–2 series lead in a 3–2 victory. Brock Nelson scored twice and provided an assist in New York's game six victory, advancing to the Second Round with a 5–3 triumph.

May 16	New York Islanders	4–3	OT	Pittsburgh Penguins	PPG Paints Arena	Recap
Kyle Palmieri (1) – 07:58		First period		11:10 – Frederick Gaudreau (1)
No scoring		Second period		03:47 – Sidney Crosby (1)
Jean-Gabriel Pageau (1) – 03:33; Brock Nelson (1) – 15:50		Third period		16:21 – Kasperi Kapanen (1)
Kyle Palmieri (2) – 16:30		First overtime period		No scoring
Ilya Sorokin 39 saves / 42 shots		Goalie stats		Tristan Jarry 37 saves / 41 shots

May 18	New York Islanders	1–2	Pittsburgh Penguins	PPG Paints Arena	Recap
No scoring		First period	03:22 – Bryan Rust (1); 13:07 – Jeff Carter (1)
Josh Bailey (1) – 14:44		Second period	No scoring
No scoring		Third period	No scoring
Semyon Varlamov 43 saves / 45 shots		Goalie stats	Tristan Jarry 37 saves / 38 shots

May 20	Pittsburgh Penguins	5–4	New York Islanders	Nassau Coliseum	Recap
Kris Letang (1) – 02:01		First period	No scoring
Jeff Carter (2) – 13:33; Jason Zucker (1) – 18:03		Second period	11:03 – Scott Mayfield (1)
Jeff Carter (3) – pp – 07:00; Brandon Tanev (1) – 16:24		Third period	03:46 – Cal Clutterbuck (1); 05:54 – pp – Anthony Beauvillier (1); 14:17 – Cal Clutterbuck (2)
Tristan Jarry 26 saves / 30 shots		Goalie stats	Semyon Varlamov 22 saves / 27 shots

May 22	Pittsburgh Penguins	1–4	New York Islanders	Nassau Coliseum	Recap
No scoring		First period	No scoring
No scoring		Second period	08:07 – Josh Bailey (2); 14:51 – Ryan Pulock (1)
Zach Aston-Reese (1) – sh – 17:25		Third period	06:04 – pp – Oliver Wahlstrom (1); 06:28 – pp – Jordan Eberle (1)
Tristan Jarry 22 saves / 26 shots		Goalie stats	Ilya Sorokin 29 saves / 30 shots

May 24	New York Islanders	3–2	2OT	Pittsburgh Penguins	PPG Paints Arena	Recap
Anthony Beauvillier (2) – 19:05		First period		08:20 – pp – Evgeni Malkin (1)
No scoring		Second period		07:37 – Bryan Rust (2)
Jordan Eberle (2) – 08:50		Third period		No scoring
Josh Bailey (3) – 00:51		Second overtime period		No scoring
Ilya Sorokin 48 saves / 50 shots		Goalie stats		Tristan Jarry 25 saves / 28 shots

May 26	Pittsburgh Penguins	3–5	New York Islanders	Nassau Coliseum	Recap
Jeff Carter (4) – 01:27; Jake Guentzel (1) – pp – 11:12		First period	05:16 – Anthony Beauvillier (3); 12:25 – Kyle Palmieri (3)
Jason Zucker (2) – 01:53		Second period	08:35 – Brock Nelson (2); 08:48 – Ryan Pulock (1); 11:34 – Brock Nelson (3)
No scoring		Third period	No scoring
Tristan Jarry 19 saves / 24 shots		Goalie stats	Ilya Sorokin 34 saves / 37 shots

New York won series 4–2

==== (E2) Washington Capitals vs. (E3) Boston Bruins ====
The Washington Capitals finished second in the East Division with 77 points, losing the tiebreaker against Pittsburgh with 33 ROWs. The Boston Bruins earned 73 points to finish third in the East Division. This was the fourth playoff series between these two teams, with Washington winning two of the three previous series. They last met in the 2012 Eastern Conference quarterfinals, which Washington won in seven games. Washington won their round-robin game in the previous year's Stanley Cup Qualifiers 2–1. These teams split their eight-game regular season series.

The Bruins defeated the Capitals in five games. In game one, with the teams tied at two a-piece after the third period, Capitals forward Nic Dowd scored at 4:41 of overtime to give Washington their first victory of the series. With game two tied 3–3 and heading into overtime again, the Bruins' Brad Marchand scored 39 seconds into the first overtime period to tie the series 1–1. In game three, the two teams extended into overtime for the third consecutive game where Capitals's goalie Ilya Samsonov misplayed the puck behind the net and Bruins forward Craig Smith scored in double overtime to give Boston a 3–2 victory. David Pastrnak scored a goal and provided an assist in Boston's 4–1 victory of game four, taking a 3–1 series and a chance to advance in game five. In game five, captain Patrice Bergeron scored twice for the Bruins, ending the series with a 3–1 victory.

May 15	Boston Bruins	2–3	OT	Washington Capitals	Capital One Arena	Recap
Jake DeBrusk (1) – 13:10		First period		06:22 – Tom Wilson (1)
Nick Ritchie (1) – pp – 16:38		Second period		08:44 – Brenden Dillon (1)
No scoring		Third period		No scoring
No scoring		First overtime period		04:41 – Nic Dowd (1)
Tuukka Rask 29 saves / 32 shots		Goalie stats		Vitek Vanecek 3 saves / 4 shots Craig Anderson 21 saves / 22 shots

May 17	Boston Bruins	4–3	OT	Washington Capitals	Capital One Arena	Recap
Jake DeBrusk (2) – 05:05; Patrice Bergeron (1) – 09:21		First period		06:31 – pp – T. J. Oshie (1); 16:42 – Garnet Hathaway (1)
No scoring		Second period		No scoring
Taylor Hall (1) – 17:11		Third period		07:04 – Garnet Hathaway (2)
Brad Marchand (1) – 00:39		First overtime period		No scoring
Tuukka Rask 36 saves / 39 shots		Goalie stats		Craig Anderson 44 saves / 48 shots

May 19	Washington Capitals	2–3	2OT	Boston Bruins	TD Garden	Recap
No scoring		First period		No scoring
Alexander Ovechkin (1) – pp – 08:21; Nic Dowd (2) – 18:15		Second period		09:17 – Taylor Hall (2)
No scoring		Third period		11:32 – pp – Brad Marchand (2)
No scoring		Second overtime period		05:48 – Craig Smith (1)
Ilya Samsonov 40 saves / 43 shots		Goalie stats		Tuukka Rask 35 saves / 37 shots

May 21	Washington Capitals	1–4	Boston Bruins	TD Garden	Recap
No scoring		First period	No scoring
No scoring		Second period	08:00 – pp – Brad Marchand (3)
Alexander Ovechkin (2) – pp – 04:54		Third period	00:29 – pp – David Pastrnak (1); 01:03 – Charlie Coyle (1); 14:50 – pp – Matt Grzelcyk (1)
Ilya Samsonov 33 saves / 37 shots		Goalie stats	Tuukka Rask 19 saves / 20 shots

May 23	Boston Bruins	3–1	Washington Capitals	Capital One Arena	Recap
No scoring		First period	No scoring
David Pastrnak (2) – 02:28; Patrice Bergeron (2) – 14:05		Second period	No scoring
Patrice Bergeron (3) – 12:25		Third period	00:11 – Conor Sheary (1)
Tuukka Rask 40 saves / 41 shots		Goalie stats	Ilya Samsonov 16 saves / 19 shots

Boston won series 4–1

=== North Division first round ===
==== (N1) Toronto Maple Leafs vs. (N4) Montreal Canadiens ====
The Toronto Maple Leafs finished first in the North Division earning 77 points. The Montreal Canadiens earned 59 points to finish fourth in the North Division. This was the sixteenth playoff meeting between these two rivals, with Montreal winning eight of the fifteen previous series. They last met in the 1979 Stanley Cup quarterfinals, which Montreal won in a four-game sweep. Toronto won seven of ten games in this year's regular season series.

The Canadiens defeated the Maple Leafs in seven games after being down 3–1 in the series. In game one, Maple Leafs captain John Tavares got upended by Ben Chiarot; while falling to the ice, Canadiens forward Corey Perry attempted to jump over Tavares' head; however, Perry's knee clipped the Toronto captain in the head. Ultimately, Tavares required a stretcher to leave the ice and was transported to the hospital. After the game, Perry expressed sincere remorse for his actions stating "I don’t know what else to do there. I tried to jump. I know Johnny pretty well and just hope he’s OK." The Canadiens won the game 2–1 on Carey Price's 35 saves along with Paul Byron's shorthanded game-winning goal in the third period. In game two, Auston Matthews scored a goal and two assists in the Maple Leafs' 5–1 victory to tie the series 1–1. The victory was their first playoff win over Montreal since their 1967 Stanley Cup-clinching game. In game three, the Maple Leafs scored twice in the second period, and with Jack Campbell's 28-save performance, secured a 2–1 victory. Campbell continued his goaltending prowess into game four with a 4–0 shutout victory, stopping all 32 shots he faced and granting the Maple Leafs a 3–1 series lead. In game five, the Canadiens grabbed a 3–0 lead in the second period, however, the Maple Leafs tied the game with 8:06 left in the third period to force overtime. In overtime, Toronto forward Alex Galchenyuk gave the puck away causing a 2-on-0 break for rookie Cole Caufield and Nick Suzuki, the latter of whom scored to spoil the Maple Leafs comeback and forced a sixth game. In the first game played in front of fans in Canada, all season long, the first two periods of game six remained scoreless until the third, when Montreal scored two power-play goals. In the final nine minutes, Toronto evened the score to send it to overtime, in which Maple Leafs defenceman Travis Dermott gave the puck up to Paul Byron, who passed it to Jesperi Kotkaniemi for the game-winning goal at 15:15, tying the series 3–3 with a 3–2 victory. Canadiens goalie Carey Price made 30 saves in game seven, defeating Toronto 3–1 and completing a 3–1 series comeback. With the victory, Montreal ties the NHL record for most series victories after being down 3–1 in a series.

May 20	Montreal Canadiens	2–1	Toronto Maple Leafs	Scotiabank Arena	Recap
Josh Anderson (1) – 12:08		First period	No scoring
No scoring		Second period	04:28 – William Nylander (1)
Paul Byron (1) – sh – 12:44		Third period	No scoring
Carey Price 35 saves / 36 shots		Goalie stats	Jack Campbell 28 saves / 30 shots

May 22	Montreal Canadiens	1–5	Toronto Maple Leafs	Scotiabank Arena	Recap
Jesperi Kotkaniemi (1) – 07:57		First period	12:25 – Jason Spezza (1)
No scoring		Second period	05:15 – Auston Matthews (1); 13:20 – pp – Rasmus Sandin (1)
No scoring		Third period	08:50 – pp – William Nylander (2); 18:37 – en – Alexander Kerfoot (1)
Carey Price 29 saves / 33 shots		Goalie stats	Jack Campbell 22 saves / 23 shots

May 24	Toronto Maple Leafs	2–1	Montreal Canadiens	Bell Centre	Recap
No scoring		First period	No scoring
William Nylander (3) – 07:18; Morgan Rielly (1) – 16:35		Second period	13:56 – Nick Suzuki (1)
No scoring		Third period	No scoring
Jack Campbell 28 saves / 29 shots		Goalie stats	Carey Price 27 saves / 29 shots

May 25	Toronto Maple Leafs	4–0	Montreal Canadiens	Bell Centre	Recap
No scoring		First period	No scoring
William Nylander (4) – 01:27; Jason Spezza (2) – 12:28; Joe Thornton (1) – pp – 14:56		Second period	No scoring
Alex Galchenyuk (1) – en – 16:29		Third period	No scoring
Jack Campbell 32 saves / 32 shots		Goalie stats	Carey Price 24 saves / 27 shots

May 27	Montreal Canadiens	4–3	OT	Toronto Maple Leafs	Scotiabank Arena	Recap
Joel Armia (1) – 05:13; Joel Armia (2) – 08:18		First period		No scoring
Jesperi Kotkaniemi (2) – 04:52		Second period		06:32 – Zach Hyman (1)
No scoring		Third period		06:52 – Jake Muzzin (1); 11:53 – Jake Muzzin (2)
Nick Suzuki (2) – 00:59		First overtime period		No scoring
Carey Price 32 saves / 35 shots		Goalie stats		Jack Campbell 26 saves / 30 shots

May 29	Toronto Maple Leafs	2–3	OT	Montreal Canadiens	Bell Centre	Recap
No scoring		First period		No scoring
No scoring		Second period		No scoring
Jason Spezza (3) – 11:35; T. J. Brodie (1) – 16:49		Third period		05:26 – pp – Corey Perry (1); 06:43 – pp – Tyler Toffoli (1)
No scoring		First overtime period		15:15 – Jesperi Kotkaniemi (3)
Jack Campbell 28 saves / 31 shots		Goalie stats		Carey Price 41 saves / 43 shots

May 31	Montreal Canadiens	3–1	Toronto Maple Leafs	Scotiabank Arena	Recap
No scoring		First period	No scoring
Brendan Gallagher (1) – 03:02; Corey Perry (2) – pp – 15:25		Second period	No scoring
Tyler Toffoli (2) – en – 17:22		Third period	18:24 – William Nylander (5)
Carey Price 29 saves / 30 shots		Goalie stats	Jack Campbell 20 saves / 22 shots

Montreal won series 4–3

==== (N2) Edmonton Oilers vs. (N3) Winnipeg Jets ====
The Edmonton Oilers finished second in the North Division with 72 points. The Winnipeg Jets earned 63 points to finish third in the North Division. This was the seventh playoff meeting between these two teams, with Edmonton winning all six previous series. They last met in the 1990 Smythe Division semifinals, which Edmonton won in seven games. Edmonton won seven of nine games in this year's regular season series.

The Jets defeated the Oilers in their first four-game sweep in franchise history. In game one, Connor Hellebuyck made 32 saves for the Jets, defeating the Oilers 4–1. Hellebuyck continued to his goaltending dominance in game two as the Oilers poured off 38 shots and no goals in a 1–0 overtime shutout loss. In game three, the Oilers jumped out to a 4–1 lead in the third period; the Jets were able to tie the game less than ten minutes later, with all three goals coming in a span of just over three minutes to force overtime. In overtime, Nikolaj Ehlers, who had been injured up to this game, scored to complete the comeback and snatch a 3–0 series lead. With game four headed into triple-overtime, the Jets ended the marathon with Kyle Connor's series-clinching goal at 6:52, sweeping the Oilers in four games upon a 4–3 victory.

May 19	Winnipeg Jets	4–1	Edmonton Oilers	Rogers Place	Recap
No scoring		First period	No scoring
Tucker Poolman (1) – 11:01		Second period	08:24 – Jesse Puljujarvi (1)
Dominic Toninato (1) – 09:14; Kyle Connor (1) – en – 18:13; Blake Wheeler (1) – en – 18:45		Third period	No scoring
Connor Hellebuyck 32 saves / 33 shots		Goalie stats	Mike Smith 18 saves / 20 shots

May 21	Winnipeg Jets	1–0	OT	Edmonton Oilers	Rogers Place	Recap
No scoring		First period		No scoring
No scoring		Second period		No scoring
No scoring		Third period		No scoring
Paul Stastny (1) – 04:06		First overtime period		No scoring
Connor Hellebuyck 38 saves / 38 shots		Goalie stats		Mike Smith 35 saves / 36 shots

May 23	Edmonton Oilers	4–5	OT	Winnipeg Jets	Bell MTS Place	Recap
Leon Draisaitl (1) – 06:33; Leon Draisaitl (2) – pp – 09:10		First period		No scoring
Zack Kassian (1) – 18:17		Second period		17:13 – pp – Nikolaj Ehlers (1)
Jujhar Khaira (1) – 04:43		Third period		11:41 – pp – Mathieu Perreault (1); 14:28 – Blake Wheeler (2); 14:44 – Josh Morrissey (1)
No scoring		First overtime period		09:13 – Nikolaj Ehlers (2)
Mike Smith 32 saves / 37 shots		Goalie stats		Connor Hellebuyck 44 saves / 48 shots

May 24	Edmonton Oilers	3–4	3OT	Winnipeg Jets	Bell MTS Place	Recap
Connor McDavid (1) – 07:33		First period		06:16 – Mark Scheifele (1); 15:55 – Mason Appleton (1)
Ryan Nugent-Hopkins (1) – 03:44; Alex Chiasson (1) – pp – 16:37		Second period		No scoring
No scoring		Third period		06:01 – Mark Scheifele (2)
No scoring		Third overtime period		06:52 – Kyle Connor (2)
Mike Smith 39 saves / 43 shots		Goalie stats		Connor Hellebuyck 37 saves / 40 shots

Winnipeg won series 4–0

=== West Division first round ===
==== (W1) Colorado Avalanche vs. (W4) St. Louis Blues ====
The Colorado Avalanche earned the Presidents' Trophy as the NHL's best regular season team with 82 points, winning the tiebreaker against the Vegas Golden Knights with 35 RWs. St. Louis finished as the fourth seed in the West Division, earning 63 points. This was the second playoff series between these two teams. Their only previous meeting was in the 2001 Western Conference Final, which Colorado won in five games. Colorado won their round-robin game in the previous year's Stanley Cup Qualifiers 2–1. Colorado won five of eight games in this year's regular season series.

The Avalanche defeated the Blues in a four-game sweep. In Game 1, the Avalanche shot the puck 50 times throughout the game with Nathan MacKinnon potting two goals and an assist in a 4–1 victory. MacKinnon scored a hat-trick in Game 2 as the Avalanche defeated the Blues 6–3. During the game, Avalanche forward Nazem Kadri hit Blues defenceman Justin Faulk in the head. Kadri would be suspended for eight games for the hit, although he filed an appeal, the suspension was upheld on May 31. In Game 3, Avalanche defenceman Ryan Graves scored a goal and two assists and Philipp Grubauer made 31 saves to defeat the Blues 5–1 and take a commanding 3–0 series lead. In Game 4, the Avalanche offensively drained the Blues with 34 shots and, with two empty-net goals, Colorado defeated St. Louis 5–2 to advance to the Second Round.

May 17	St. Louis Blues	1–4	Colorado Avalanche	Ball Arena	Recap
No scoring		First period	15:15 – pp – Cale Makar (1)
Jordan Kyrou (1) – 16:31		Second period	No scoring
No scoring		Third period	00:30 – Nathan MacKinnon (1); 08:30 – Gabriel Landeskog (1); 19:20 – en – Nathan MacKinnon (2)
Jordan Binnington 46 saves / 49 shots		Goalie stats	Philipp Grubauer 22 saves / 23 shots

May 19	St. Louis Blues	3–6	Colorado Avalanche	Ball Arena	Recap
No scoring		First period	00:35 – Joonas Donskoi (1); 18:05 – pp – Nathan MacKinnon (3)
Samuel Blais (1) – 16:17		Second period	03:14 – pp – Joonas Donskoi (2)
Brayden Schenn (1) – pp – 10:07; Mike Hoffman (1) – 15:40		Third period	15:25 – Nathan MacKinnon (4); 17:51 – en – Brandon Saad (1); 19:48 – en – Nathan MacKinnon (5)
Jordan Binnington 29 saves / 33 shots		Goalie stats	Philipp Grubauer 32 saves / 35 shots

May 21	Colorado Avalanche	5–1	St. Louis Blues	Enterprise Center	Recap
No scoring		First period	No scoring
Ryan Graves (1) – 01:57; Alex Newhook (1) – 12:37; Tyson Jost (1) – 16:08		Second period	16:17 – sh – Tyler Bozak (1)
Brandon Saad (2) – 13:42; J. T. Compher (1) – sh-en – 19:06		Third period	No scoring
Philipp Grubauer 31 saves / 32 shots		Goalie stats	Jordan Binnington 21 saves / 25 shots

May 23	Colorado Avalanche	5–2	St. Louis Blues	Enterprise Center	Recap
No scoring		First period	No scoring
Brandon Saad (3) – pp – 11:37; Gabriel Landeskog (2) – 14:53		Second period	04:25 – Vladimir Tarasenko (1)
Mikko Rantanen (1) – 04:20; Nathan MacKinnon (6) – pp-en – 19:04; Valeri Nichushkin (1) – pp-en – 19:54		Third period	08:39 – pp – Vladimir Tarasenko (2)
Philipp Grubauer 18 saves / 20 shots		Goalie stats	Jordan Binnington 29 saves / 32 shots

Colorado won series 4–0

==== (W2) Vegas Golden Knights vs. (W3) Minnesota Wild ====
The Vegas Golden Knights finished second in the West Division with 82 points, losing the tiebreaker against Colorado with 30 RWs. The Minnesota Wild earned 75 points to finish third in the West Division. This was the first playoff meeting between these two teams. Minnesota won five of eight games in this year's regular season series.

The Golden Knights defeated the Wild in seven games after having a 3–1 series lead. Vegas goalie Marc-Andre Fleury made NHL history in Game 1, becoming the first goaltender to start at least one game during the playoffs in fifteen consecutive seasons. However, his team ended up losing the game in an overtime shutout via Wild goalie Cam Talbot's 42-save performance and Joel Eriksson Ek's goal. In Game 2, Alex Tuch scored twice for the Golden Knights, winning the match 3–1. In Game 3, the Golden Knights scored five straight after being down 2–0 in the first period en route to a 5–2 victory. Fleury shut out the Wild in Game 4, stopping all 35 shots he faced in a 4–0 victory taking a 3–1 series lead. On the brink in Game 5, the Wild were minimized to 14 shots, however, they scored 4 times and turned away 38 shots to win 4–2 and extend the series to a sixth game. The Wild staved off elimination in Game 6, scoring three goals in the third period of Cam Talbot's 23-save shutout to win 3–0. In Game 7, Mattias Janmark scored a hat-trick for the Golden Knights, preventing the Wild from completing a 3–1 series comeback with a 6–2 rout.

May 16	Minnesota Wild	1–0	OT	Vegas Golden Knights	T-Mobile Arena	Recap
No scoring		First period		No scoring
No scoring		Second period		No scoring
No scoring		Third period		No scoring
Joel Eriksson Ek (1) – 03:20		First overtime period		No scoring
Cam Talbot 42 saves / 42 shots		Goalie stats		Marc-Andre Fleury 29 saves / 30 shots

May 18	Minnesota Wild	1–3	Vegas Golden Knights	T-Mobile Arena	Recap
No scoring		First period	No scoring
Matt Dumba (1) – 12:07		Second period	12:25 – Jonathan Marchessault (1); 17:19 – Alex Tuch (1)
No scoring		Third period	19:07 – pp – Alex Tuch (2)
Cam Talbot 25 saves / 28 shots		Goalie stats	Marc-Andre Fleury 34 saves / 35 shots

May 20	Vegas Golden Knights	5–2	Minnesota Wild	Xcel Energy Center	Recap
No scoring		First period	02:16 – Ryan Hartman (1); 08:30 – Joel Eriksson Ek (2)
Mark Stone (1) – 08:39; Patrick Brown (1) – 15:19; Reilly Smith (1) – 17:33		Second period	No scoring
William Karlsson (1) – 17:36; Mark Stone (2) – en – 19:01		Third period	No scoring
Marc-Andre Fleury 14 saves / 16 shots		Goalie stats	Cam Talbot 35 saves / 39 shots

May 22	Vegas Golden Knights	4–0	Minnesota Wild	Xcel Energy Center	Recap
Nicolas Roy (1) – 10:37		First period	No scoring
Alex Tuch (3) – 09:08; Mark Stone (3) – sh – 13:41		Second period	No scoring
Nicolas Roy (2) – en – 18:32		Third period	No scoring
Marc-Andre Fleury 35 saves / 35 shots		Goalie stats	Cam Talbot 14 saves / 17 shots

May 24	Minnesota Wild	4–2	Vegas Golden Knights	T-Mobile Arena	Recap
Kirill Kaprizov (1) – 09:06; Zach Parise (1) – 11:57; Jordan Greenway (1) – 16:34		First period	08:14 – Mark Stone (4)
No scoring		Second period	09:43 – pp – Alec Martinez (1)
Nico Sturm (1) – en – 19:21		Third period	No scoring
Cam Talbot 38 saves / 40 shots		Goalie stats	Marc-Andre Fleury 10 saves / 13 shots

May 26	Vegas Golden Knights	0–3	Minnesota Wild	Xcel Energy Center	Recap
No scoring		First period	No scoring
No scoring		Second period	No scoring
No scoring		Third period	04:21 – Ryan Hartman (2); 09:35 – pp – Kevin Fiala (1); 15:17 – Nick Bjugstad (1)
Marc-Andre Fleury 21 saves / 24 shots		Goalie stats	Cam Talbot 23 saves / 23 shots

May 28	Minnesota Wild	2–6	Vegas Golden Knights	T-Mobile Arena	Recap
Zach Parise (2) – 16:49		First period	05:09 – Mattias Janmark (1)
Kirill Kaprizov (2) – pp – 04:35		Second period	02:05 – Nicolas Hague (1); 07:44 – Max Pacioretty (1); 13:38 – Zach Whitecloud (1)
No scoring		Third period	12:36 – Mattias Janmark (2); 16:53 – en – Mattias Janmark (3)
Cam Talbot 28 saves / 33 shots		Goalie stats	Marc-Andre Fleury 18 saves / 20 shots

Vegas won series 4–3

== Second round ==
=== Central Division second round ===
==== (C1) Carolina Hurricanes vs. (C3) Tampa Bay Lightning ====
This was the first playoff meeting between these two teams. These teams split their eight-game regular season series.

The Lightning defeated the Hurricanes in five games. Lightning goalie Andrei Vasilevskiy backstopped Tampa Bay with 37 saves in game one, defeating the Hurricanes 2–1. In game two, Vasilevskiy continued his goaltending excellence with 31 saves, defeating the Hurricanes again by the score of 2–1. The Hurricanes opted to start Petr Mrazek in game three, which paid dividends as the goaltender made 35 saves in Carolina's 3–2 overtime victory with Jordan Staal scoring the game-winning goal. In game four, the Hurricanes and Lightning combined for eight goals in the second period, with Tampa Bay overcoming a two-goal deficit in that period and defeating Carolina 6–4 for a 3–1 series lead. Vasilevskiy made 29 saves in a 2–0 shutout victory in game five, advancing Tampa Bay to the Stanley Cup Semifinals for the second consecutive season.

May 30	Tampa Bay Lightning	2–1	Carolina Hurricanes	PNC Arena	Recap
No scoring		First period	No scoring
Brayden Point (5) – pp – 08:15		Second period	No scoring
Barclay Goodrow (1) – 12:39		Third period	01:41 – pp – Jake Bean (1)
Andrei Vasilevskiy 37 saves / 38 shots		Goalie stats	Alex Nedeljkovic 28 saves / 30 shots

June 1	Tampa Bay Lightning	2–1	Carolina Hurricanes	PNC Arena	Recap
No scoring		First period	No scoring
Alex Killorn (5) – 07:09		Second period	No scoring
Anthony Cirelli (3) – 08:06		Third period	18:30 – Andrei Svechnikov (2)
Andrei Vasilevskiy 31 saves / 32 shots		Goalie stats	Alex Nedeljkovic 13 saves / 15 shots

June 3	Carolina Hurricanes	3–2	OT	Tampa Bay Lightning	Amalie Arena	Recap
No scoring		First period		No scoring
Brett Pesce (2) – 05:15; Sebastian Aho (6) – 07:40		Second period		08:57 – pp – Brayden Point (6); 16:18 – pp – Alex Killorn (6)
No scoring		Third period		No scoring
Jordan Staal (5) – pp – 05:57		First overtime period		No scoring
Petr Mrazek 35 saves / 37 shots		Goalie stats		Andrei Vasilevskiy 24 saves / 27 shots

June 5	Carolina Hurricanes	4–6	Tampa Bay Lightning	Amalie Arena	Recap
No scoring		First period	14:24 – Brayden Point (7)
Teuvo Teravainen (2) – 04:30; Jesper Fast (1) – 05:09; Dougie Hamilton (2) – 10:35; Jaccob Slavin (1) – 12:41		Second period	09:54 – pp – Steven Stamkos (4); 14:38 – pp – Nikita Kucherov (4); 17:10 – Tyler Johnson (1); 19:37 – pp – Steven Stamkos (5)
No scoring		Third period	06:01 – Nikita Kucherov (5)
Petr Mrazek 20 saves / 26 shots		Goalie stats	Andrei Vasilevskiy 21 saves / 25 shots

June 8	Tampa Bay Lightning	2–0	Carolina Hurricanes	PNC Arena	Recap
No scoring		First period	No scoring
Brayden Point (8) – pp – 04:06		Second period	No scoring
Ross Colton (3) – 09:04		Third period	No scoring
Andrei Vasilevskiy 29 saves / 29 shots		Goalie stats	Alex Nedeljkovic 23 saves / 25 shots

Tampa Bay won series 4–1

=== East Division second round ===
==== (E3) Boston Bruins vs. (E4) New York Islanders ====
This was the third playoff meeting between these two teams with New York winning both previous series. They last met in the 1983 Prince of Wales Conference final, which New York won in six games. New York won five of eight games in this year's regular season series.

The Islanders defeated the Bruins in six games. In game one, David Pastrnak scored a hat trick to give the Bruins a 5–2 victory. Casey Cizikas evened the series for the Islanders in game two, scoring the overtime goal at 14:48 on a breakaway for New York and defeating Boston 4–3. In game three, the Bruins and Islanders played defensively until overtime was required. In overtime, Brad Marchand scored in the first overtime period to give Boston a 2–1 victory. Mathew Barzal scored the game-winning goal of game four, scoring with 6:57 left in the third period and adding an assist in a 4–1 victory, tying the series 2–2. In game five, the Islanders jumped to a 5–2 lead early in the third period, then held off the Bruins' potential comeback to win 5–4. Brock Nelson scored twice, including the series-winning goal, for the Islanders in game six defeating the Bruins 6–2 and advancing to the Stanley Cup Semifinals.

May 29	New York Islanders	2–5	Boston Bruins	TD Garden	Recap
Anthony Beauvillier (4) – pp – 11:48		First period	19:36 – pp – David Pastrnak (3)
Adam Pelech (1) – 12:34		Second period	11:08 – David Pastrnak (4)
No scoring		Third period	06:20 – Charlie McAvoy (1); 15:50 – David Pastrnak (5); 18:35 – pp-en – Taylor Hall (3)
Ilya Sorokin 35 saves / 39 shots		Goalie stats	Tuukka Rask 20 saves / 22 shots

May 31	New York Islanders	4–3	OT	Boston Bruins	TD Garden	Recap
No scoring		First period		02:38 – Charlie Coyle (2)
Josh Bailey (4) – pp – 06:52; Kyle Palmieri (4) – 11:00; Jean-Gabriel Pageau (2) – pp – 17:21		Second period		No scoring
No scoring		Third period		10:34 – Patrice Bergeron (4); 15:06 – pp – Brad Marchand (4)
Casey Cizikas (1) – 14:48		First overtime period		No scoring
Semyon Varlamov 39 saves / 42 shots		Goalie stats		Tuukka Rask 35 saves / 39 shots

June 3	Boston Bruins	2–1	OT	New York Islanders	Nassau Coliseum	Recap
Craig Smith (2) – 05:52		First period		No scoring
No scoring		Second period		No scoring
No scoring		Third period		14:34 – Mathew Barzal (1)
Brad Marchand (5) – 03:36		First overtime period		No scoring
Tuukka Rask 28 saves / 29 shots		Goalie stats		Semyon Varlamov 39 saves / 41 shots

June 5	Boston Bruins	1–4	New York Islanders	Nassau Coliseum	Recap
No scoring		First period	No scoring
David Krejci (1) – pp – 03:57		Second period	06:38 – Kyle Palmieri (5)
No scoring		Third period	13:03 – Mathew Barzal (2); 18:57 – en – Casey Cizikas (2); 19:57 – en – Jean-Gabriel Pageau (3)
Tuukka Rask 30 saves / 32 shots		Goalie stats	Semyon Varlamov 28 saves / 29 shots

June 7	New York Islanders	5–4	Boston Bruins	TD Garden	Recap
Mathew Barzal (3) – pp – 18:49		First period	01:25 – David Pastrnak (6)
Kyle Palmieri (6) – pp – 04:49; Josh Bailey (5) – 14:30; Jordan Eberle (3) – pp – 16:38		Second period	07:27 – Brad Marchand (6)
Brock Nelson (4) – 01:59		Third period	03:48 – pp – David Pastrnak (7); 14:43 – David Krejci (2)
Semyon Varlamov 40 saves / 44 shots		Goalie stats	Tuukka Rask 12 saves / 16 shots Jeremy Swayman 2 saves / 3 shots

June 9	Boston Bruins	2–6	New York Islanders	Nassau Coliseum	Recap
Brad Marchand (7) – pp – 17:36		First period	08:52 – Travis Zajac (1)
No scoring		Second period	05:20 – Brock Nelson (5); 12:39 – Brock Nelson (6); 16:07 – Kyle Palmieri (7)
Brad Marchand (8) – pp – 05:38		Third period	19:01 – en – Cal Clutterbuck (3); 19:12 – en – Ryan Pulock (3)
Tuukka Rask 23 saves / 27 shots		Goalie stats	Semyon Varlamov 23 saves / 25 shots

New York won series 4–2

=== North Division second round ===
==== (N3) Winnipeg Jets vs. (N4) Montreal Canadiens ====
This was the first playoff meeting between these two teams. This was also the first Stanley Cup playoff meeting between these two cities since 1908, when the Montreal Wanderers retained the Stanley Cup by defeating the Winnipeg Maple Leafs. Winnipeg won six of nine games in this year's regular season series. This was the first second round series between two Canadian-based NHL teams since 2002.

The Canadiens defeated the Jets in a four-game sweep. In game one, Joel Edmundson had two assists in the Canadiens' 5–3 victory. After Canadiens forward Jake Evans scored the empty-net goal against Winnipeg, Jets forward Mark Scheifele charged Evans, knocking him to the ice. Evans required a stretcher to leave the ice. Scheifele was suspended for four games following the hit. Tyler Toffoli scored the only goal of game two as Carey Price shut out the Jets 1–0, making 30 saves in the process. In game three, Joel Armia scored twice and added an assist to Montreal's 5–1 victory, granting the Canadiens a 3–0 series lead. In game four, the Jets came back from a two-goal deficit in the second period, eventually forcing overtime. In the overtime period, Toffoli scored the series-winning goal at 1:39, completing the four-game sweep, and advancing Montreal to the Stanley Cup Semifinals.

June 2	Montreal Canadiens	5–3	Winnipeg Jets	Bell MTS Place	Recap
Jesperi Kotkaniemi (4) – 03:30; Eric Staal (1) – 05:10; Nick Suzuki (3) – 17:14		First period	11:52 – sh – Adam Lowry (1)
No scoring		Second period	No scoring
Brendan Gallagher (2) – pp – 11:04; Jake Evans (1) – en – 19:03		Third period	09:22 – Derek Forbort (1); 18:18 – Kyle Connor (3)
Carey Price 27 saves / 30 shots		Goalie stats	Connor Hellebuyck 28 saves / 32 shots

June 4	Montreal Canadiens	1–0	Winnipeg Jets	Bell MTS Place	Recap
No scoring		First period	No scoring
Tyler Toffoli (2) – sh – 01:41		Second period	No scoring
No scoring		Third period	No scoring
Carey Price 30 saves / 30 shots		Goalie stats	Connor Hellebuyck 23 saves / 24 shots

June 6	Winnipeg Jets	1–5	Montreal Canadiens	Bell Centre	Recap
No scoring		First period	04:45 – Corey Perry (3)
Adam Lowry (2) – 17:51		Second period	09:24 – Artturi Lehkonen (1); 13:41 – sh – Joel Armia (3)
No scoring		Third period	08:52 – pp – Nick Suzuki (4); 16:42 – sh-en – Joel Armia (4)
Connor Hellebuyck 28 saves / 32 shots		Goalie stats	Carey Price 26 saves / 27 shots

June 7	Winnipeg Jets	2–3	OT	Montreal Canadiens	Bell Centre	Recap
No scoring		First period		08:01 – pp – Erik Gustafsson (1); 19:09 – Artturi Lehkonen (2)
Logan Stanley (1) – 01:40; Logan Stanley (2) – 05:29		Second period		No scoring
No scoring		Third period		No scoring
No scoring		First overtime period		01:39 – Tyler Toffoli (4)
Connor Hellebuyck 38 saves / 41 shots		Goalie stats		Carey Price 14 saves / 16 shots

Montreal won series 4–0

=== West Division second round ===
==== (W1) Colorado Avalanche vs. (W2) Vegas Golden Knights ====
This was the first playoff series between these two teams. Vegas won their round-robin game in the previous year's Stanley Cup qualifiers 4–3. These teams split their eight-game regular season series.

The Golden Knights defeated the Avalanche in six games. In game one, the Golden Knights opted to start Robin Lehner in place of Marc-Andre Fleury; Lehner proceeded to allow seven goals in the game with Nathan MacKinnon and captain Gabriel Landeskog both scoring twice and Cale Makar assisting thrice in a 7–1 rout of Vegas. With game two headed to overtime, Vegas forward Reilly Smith took a slashing penalty on Mikko Rantanen. On the ensuing power-play for Colorado, Rantanen scored to give the Avalanche a 3–2 victory. Jonathan Marchessault and Max Pacioretty scored 45 second apart in the third period of game three taking the lead in the game and winning 3–2 for the Golden Knights. Marchessault scored a hat trick in game four, evening the series 2–2 with a 5–1 victory. In game five, the Avalanche grabbed a 2–0 lead, except the Golden Knights expunged that lead in the third period, marking their goals 3:04 apart and forcing overtime. In overtime, captain Mark Stone scored 50 seconds into the extra period, granting Vegas a 3–2 series lead with a 3–2 victory. In game six, Alex Pietrangelo scored a goal and two assists in a 6–3 victory, advancing Vegas to the third round for the second consecutive season.

May 30	Vegas Golden Knights	1–7	Colorado Avalanche	Ball Arena	Recap
No scoring		First period	04:55 – Mikko Rantanen (2); 10:13 – Gabriel Landeskog (3)
William Karlsson (2) – 14:59		Second period	01:04 – Brandon Saad (4); 04:03 – Nathan MacKinnon (7); 14:23 – pp – Gabriel Landeskog (4); 17:05 – Nathan MacKinnon (8)
No scoring		Third period	15:49 – pp – Cale Makar (2)
Robin Lehner 30 saves / 37 shots		Goalie stats	Philipp Grubauer 24 saves / 25 shots

June 2	Vegas Golden Knights	2–3	OT	Colorado Avalanche	Ball Arena	Recap
Alec Martinez (2) – pp – 09:32		First period		03:39 – Brandon Saad (5); 17:08 – pp – Tyson Jost (2)
Reilly Smith (2) – 10:28		Second period		No scoring
No scoring		Third period		No scoring
No scoring		First overtime period		02:07 – pp – Mikko Rantanen (3)
Marc-Andre Fleury 22 saves / 25 shots		Goalie stats		Philipp Grubauer 39 saves / 41 shots

June 4	Colorado Avalanche	2–3	Vegas Golden Knights	T-Mobile Arena	Recap
No scoring		First period	No scoring
Carl Soderberg (1) – 06:07		Second period	04:38 – William Karlsson (3)
Mikko Rantanen (4) – pp – 05:04		Third period	14:42 – Jonathan Marchessault (2); 15:27 – Max Pacioretty (2)
Philipp Grubauer 40 saves / 43 shots		Goalie stats	Marc-Andre Fleury 18 saves / 20 shots

June 6	Colorado Avalanche	1–5	Vegas Golden Knights	T-Mobile Arena	Recap
Brandon Saad (6) – 01:50		First period	07:07 – Jonathan Marchessault (3)
No scoring		Second period	01:11 – Max Pacioretty (3); 11:28 – pp – Jonathan Marchessault (4)
No scoring		Third period	06:01 – Jonathan Marchessault (5); 13:13 – Patrick Brown (2)
Philipp Grubauer 30 saves / 35 shots		Goalie stats	Marc-Andre Fleury 17 saves / 18 shots

June 8	Vegas Golden Knights	3–2	OT	Colorado Avalanche	Ball Arena	Recap
No scoring		First period		19:58 – Brandon Saad (7)
No scoring		Second period		16:28 – Joonas Donskoi (3)
Alex Tuch (4) – 01:03; Jonathan Marchessault (6) – 04:07		Third period		No scoring
Mark Stone (4) – 00:50		First overtime period		No scoring
Marc-Andre Fleury 28 saves / 30 shots		Goalie stats		Philipp Grubauer 22 saves / 25 shots

June 10	Colorado Avalanche	3–6	Vegas Golden Knights	T-Mobile Arena	Recap
Devon Toews (1) – 00:23		First period	01:15 – Nick Holden (1); 15:06 – William Karlsson (4)
Mikko Rantanen (5) – pp – 03:47; Andre Burakovsky (1) – 16:52		Second period	14:27 – Keegan Kolesar (1); 19:42 – Alex Pietrangelo (1)
No scoring		Third period	11:46 – William Carrier (1); 16:50 – en – Max Pacioretty (4)
Philipp Grubauer 17 saves / 22 shots		Goalie stats	Marc-Andre Fleury 30 saves / 33 shots

Vegas won series 4–2

== Stanley Cup semifinals ==
Note: All teams advancing from the second round into the semifinals were reseeded based on the final League standings.

This was the first time since 1981 that this round was not contested as conference finals. Due to the league using an intra-divisional schedule during the regular season, none of the participants in the Stanley Cup semifinals played each other during this year's regular season. The last time this occurred was in 1924 when the Stanley Cup was contested by the champions of the NHL, PCHA, and WCHL.

=== (1) Vegas Golden Knights vs. (4) Montreal Canadiens ===
This was the first playoff meeting between these two teams. This was Vegas' second consecutive semifinals/conference finals appearance and third within their first four seasons of play. Vegas lost the previous year's Western Conference final in five games to the Dallas Stars. Montreal made their eighth Semifinals/Conference finals appearance since the league began using a 16-team or greater playoff format in 1980. Their most recent semifinals/conference finals appearance was in the 2014 Eastern Conference final, which they lost to the New York Rangers in six games.

The Canadiens defeated the Golden Knights in six games. The Golden Knights struck first in game one; with the goal, Montreal trailed in a game for the first time since game four of their first round series with the Maple Leafs. Shea Theodore lead Vegas in that game scoring a goal and an assist in a 4–1 victory. In game two, the Canadiens scored twice in the first period and held off a third period rush by the Golden Knights to win 3–2. Back in Montreal for game three, Vegas goaltender Marc-Andre Fleury misplayed the puck behind his net, coughing up the puck to Josh Anderson who tied the game with 1:55 left in the game. In overtime, Jesperi Kotkaniemi threw the puck to an open Anderson and Paul Byron, the former of which scored to give Montreal a 3–2 victory. After missing game three, Canadiens' interim head coach Dominique Ducharme tested positive for COVID-19, placing him in isolation for fourteen days; he continued working with the team through phone and video calls, talking with the coaching staff and players through the remainder of the series. Robin Lehner started for Vegas in game four, making 27 saves in a 2–1 overtime win with Nicolas Roy scoring the game-winning goal 1:18 into the first overtime. In game five, Nick Suzuki provided a goal and two assists in Montreal's 4–1 victory, giving the Canadiens a chance to clinch a spot in the Final in game six. Carey Price made 37 saves and Artturi Lehkonen scored the overtime series-winning goal in game six, sending the Canadiens to the Stanley Cup Final for the first time since 1993. As the winners of the semifinal and due to the temporary playoff restructuring, the Canadiens accepted their first Clarence S. Campbell Bowl, normally presented to the Western Conference playoff champions.

June 14	Montreal Canadiens	1–4	Vegas Golden Knights	T-Mobile Arena	Recap
No scoring		First period	09:15 – Shea Theodore (1)
Cole Caufield (1) – pp – 12:05		Second period	02:18 – Alec Martinez (3); 12:58 – Mattias Janmark (4)
No scoring		Third period	10:06 – Nick Holden (2)
Carey Price 26 saves / 30 shots		Goalie stats	Marc-Andre Fleury 28 saves / 29 shots

June 16	Montreal Canadiens	3–2	Vegas Golden Knights	T-Mobile Arena	Recap
Joel Armia (5) – 06:12; Tyler Toffoli (5) – 16:30		First period	No scoring
Paul Byron (2) – 17:45		Second period	18:46 – Alex Pietrangelo (2)
No scoring		Third period	14:46 – Alex Pietrangelo (3)
Carey Price 29 saves / 31 shots		Goalie stats	Marc-Andre Fleury 20 saves / 23 shots

June 18	Vegas Golden Knights	2–3	OT	Montreal Canadiens	Bell Centre	Recap
No scoring		First period		No scoring
Nicolas Roy (3) – 03:16		Second period		03:54 – Cole Caufield (2)
Alex Pietrangelo (4) – 02:22		Third period		18:05 – Josh Anderson (2)
No scoring		First overtime period		12:53 – Josh Anderson (3)
Marc-Andre Fleury 24 saves / 27 shots		Goalie stats		Carey Price 43 saves / 45 shots

June 20	Vegas Golden Knights	2–1	OT	Montreal Canadiens	Bell Centre	Recap
No scoring		First period		No scoring
No scoring		Second period		18:55 – Paul Byron (3)
Brayden McNabb (1) – 10:37		Third period		No scoring
Nicolas Roy (4) – 01:18		First overtime period		No scoring
Robin Lehner 27 saves / 28 shots		Goalie stats		Carey Price 19 saves / 21 shots

June 22	Montreal Canadiens	4–1	Vegas Golden Knights	T-Mobile Arena	Recap
Jesperi Kotkaniemi (5) – 08:45		First period	No scoring
Eric Staal (2) – 06:32; Cole Caufield (3) – pp – 09:49		Second period	No scoring
Nick Suzuki (5) – en – 18:54		Third period	04:09 – Max Pacioretty (5)
Carey Price 26 saves / 27 shots		Goalie stats	Marc-Andre Fleury 22 saves / 25 shots

June 24	Vegas Golden Knights	2–3	OT	Montreal Canadiens	Bell Centre	Recap
Reilly Smith (3) – 14:54		First period		14:06 – pp – Shea Weber (1)
No scoring		Second period		09:36 – Cole Caufield (4)
Alec Martinez (4) – 01:08		Third period		No scoring
No scoring		First overtime period		01:39 – Artturi Lehkonen (3)
Robin Lehner 29 saves / 32 shots		Goalie stats		Carey Price 37 saves / 39 shots

Montreal won series 4–2

=== (2) Tampa Bay Lightning vs. (3) New York Islanders ===
This was the second consecutive postseason match-up and the fourth overall playoff meeting between these two teams; with Tampa Bay winning all three previous series. Both teams were in their second consecutive semifinals/conference finals appearance; Tampa Bay was in their seventh appearance while New York was in their eighth appearance in the semifinals/conference finals since the league began using a 16-team or greater playoff format in 1980. Tampa Bay won the previous year's Eastern Conference final match-up in six games. This was also the first semifinal/conference final since 2014 to feature a rematch of the previous year's semifinal/conference final series.

The Lightning defeated the Islanders in seven games. In game one, Islanders goalie Semyon Varlamov made 30 saves for New York, defeating Tampa Bay 2–1. The Lightning evened the series in game two, led by Nikita Kucherov's three assists in a 4–2 victory. Andrei Vasilevskiy was stout for the Lightning in game three, making 27 saves in a 2–1 victory. New York spoiled the Lightning's comeback in game four with Ryan Pulock blocking a shot with 2.7 seconds left in the game to preserve a 3–2 lead, tying the series 2–2. The Lightning dominated in game five, scoring eight unanswered goals, granting Vasilevskiy a 21-save 8–0 shutout victory. In game six, which later proved to be the last game ever played at the Nassau Veterans Memorial Coliseum, the Islanders overcame a 2–0 deficit and won in overtime thanks to Anthony Beauvillier's goal, sending the series to a seventh game. Yanni Gourde scored the only goal of game seven, shorthanded early in the second period, while Vasilevskiy made 18 saves in a 1–0 shutout victory for Tampa Bay, advancing to the Stanley Cup Final for the second consecutive season. As the winners of the semifinal and due to the temporary playoff restructuring, the Lightning accepted the Prince of Wales Trophy normally presented to the Eastern Conference playoff champions.

June 13	New York Islanders	2–1	Tampa Bay Lightning	Amalie Arena	Recap
No scoring		First period	No scoring
Mathew Barzal (4) – 12:32		Second period	No scoring
Ryan Pulock (4) – 05:46		Third period	19:06 – pp – Brayden Point (9)
Semyon Varlamov 30 saves / 31 shots		Goalie stats	Andrei Vasilevskiy 29 saves / 31 shots

June 15	New York Islanders	2–4	Tampa Bay Lightning	Amalie Arena	Recap
Brock Nelson (7) – pp – 13:30		First period	08:58 – Brayden Point (10)
No scoring		Second period	13:15 – Ondrej Palat (3)
Mathew Barzal (5) – 16:44		Third period	02:16 – Jan Rutta (1); 09:17 – pp – Victor Hedman (1)
Semyon Varlamov 23 saves / 27 shots Ilya Sorokin 6 saves / 6 shots		Goalie stats	Andrei Vasilevskiy 24 saves / 26 shots

June 17	Tampa Bay Lightning	2–1	New York Islanders	Nassau Coliseum	Recap
Yanni Gourde (3) – 10:05		First period	No scoring
Brayden Point (11) – 19:40		Second period	17:01 – Cal Clutterbuck (4)
No scoring		Third period	No scoring
Andrei Vasilevskiy 27 saves / 28 shots		Goalie stats	Semyon Varlamov 23 saves / 25 shots

June 19	Tampa Bay Lightning	2–3	New York Islanders	Nassau Coliseum	Recap
No scoring		First period	No scoring
No scoring		Second period	05:30 – Josh Bailey (6); 13:46 – Mathew Barzal (6); 17:57 – Matt Martin (1)
Brayden Point (12) – 03:45; Tyler Johnson (2) – 06:43		Third period	No scoring
Andrei Vasilevskiy 27 saves / 30 shots		Goalie stats	Semyon Varlamov 28 saves / 30 shots

June 21	New York Islanders	0–8	Tampa Bay Lightning	Amalie Arena	Recap
No scoring		First period	00:45 – Steven Stamkos (6); 11:04 – Yanni Gourde (4); 15:27 – Alex Killorn (7)
No scoring		Second period	05:42 – pp – Steven Stamkos (7); 15:43 – Ondrej Palat (4); 17:53 – pp – Alex Killorn (8)
No scoring		Third period	01:59 – pp – Brayden Point (13); 12:05 – Luke Schenn (1)
Semyon Varlamov 13 saves / 16 shots Ilya Sorokin 21 saves / 26 shots		Goalie stats	Andrei Vasilevskiy 21 saves / 21 shots

June 23	Tampa Bay Lightning	2–3	OT	New York Islanders	Nassau Coliseum	Recap
Brayden Point (14) – 16:02		First period		No scoring
Anthony Cirelli (4) – 12:36		Second period		14:22 – Jordan Eberle (4)
No scoring		Third period		11:16 – Scott Mayfield (2)
No scoring		First overtime period		01:08 – Anthony Beauvillier (5)
Andrei Vasilevskiy 25 saves / 28 shots		Goalie stats		Semyon Varlamov 22 saves / 24 shots

June 25	New York Islanders	0–1	Tampa Bay Lightning	Amalie Arena	Recap
No scoring		First period	No scoring
No scoring		Second period	01:49 – sh – Yanni Gourde (5)
No scoring		Third period	No scoring
Semyon Varlamov 30 saves / 31 shots		Goalie stats	Andrei Vasilevskiy 18 saves / 18 shots

Tampa Bay won series 4–3

== Stanley Cup Final ==
This was the fourth playoff meeting between these two teams with Tampa Bay winning two of the three previous series. They last met in the 2015 Eastern Conference second round, which Tampa Bay won in six games. This was Tampa Bay's second consecutive Final appearance and fourth overall. They won last year's Final against the Dallas Stars in six games. Montreal appeared in their thirty-fifth Stanley Cup Final. They are the most recent Canadian-based team to win the Stanley Cup, doing so in 1993 (their most recent Final appearance) against the Los Angeles Kings, winning in five games. They were also the first Canadian team since the Vancouver Canucks in 2011 to reach the Final. This was the first Final since 2009 to feature two teams in the same time zone. These teams did not play each other during this year's regular season.

June 28	Montreal Canadiens	1–5	Tampa Bay Lightning	Amalie Arena	Recap
No scoring		First period	06:19 – Erik Cernak (1)
Ben Chiarot (1) – 17:40		Second period	05:47 – Yanni Gourde (6)
No scoring		Third period	02:00 – Nikita Kucherov (6); 11:25 – Nikita Kucherov (7); 18:50 – pp – Steven Stamkos (8)
Carey Price 22 saves / 27 shots		Goalie stats	Andrei Vasilevskiy 18 saves / 19 shots

June 30	Montreal Canadiens	1–3	Tampa Bay Lightning	Amalie Arena	Recap
No scoring		First period	No scoring
Nick Suzuki (6) – pp – 10:36		Second period	06:40 – Anthony Cirelli (5); 19:58 – Blake Coleman (2)
No scoring		Third period	15:42 – Ondrej Palat (5)
Carey Price 20 saves / 23 shots		Goalie stats	Andrei Vasilevskiy 42 saves / 43 shots

July 2	Tampa Bay Lightning	6–3	Montreal Canadiens	Bell Centre	Recap
Jan Rutta (2) – 01:52; Victor Hedman (2) – pp – 03:27		First period	11:16 – Phillip Danault (1)
Nikita Kucherov (8) – 01:40; Tyler Johnson (3) – 03:33		Second period	18:04 – Nick Suzuki (7)
Tyler Johnson (4) – 15:19; Blake Coleman (3) – en – 16:48		Third period	15:58 – Corey Perry (4)
Andrei Vasilevskiy 32 saves / 35 shots		Goalie stats	Carey Price 24 saves / 29 shots

July 5	Tampa Bay Lightning	2–3	OT	Montreal Canadiens	Bell Centre	Recap
No scoring		First period		15:39 – Josh Anderson (4)
Barclay Goodrow (2) – 17:20		Second period		No scoring
Patrick Maroon (2) – 13:48		Third period		08:48 – Alexander Romanov (1)
No scoring		First overtime period		03:57 – Josh Anderson (5)
Andrei Vasilevskiy 18 saves / 21 shots		Goalie stats		Carey Price 32 saves / 34 shots

July 7	Montreal Canadiens	0–1	Tampa Bay Lightning	Amalie Arena	Recap
No scoring		First period	No scoring
No scoring		Second period	13:27 – Ross Colton (4)
No scoring		Third period	No scoring
Carey Price 29 saves / 30 shots		Goalie stats	Andrei Vasilevskiy 22 saves / 22 shots

Tampa Bay won series 4–1

== Player statistics ==
=== Skaters ===
These are the top ten skaters based on points, following the conclusion of the playoffs.

Player	Team	GP	G	A	Pts	+/–	PIM
Nikita Kucherov	Tampa Bay Lightning	23	8	24	32	+6	14
Brayden Point	Tampa Bay Lightning	23	14	9	23	+7	8
Steven Stamkos	Tampa Bay Lightning	23	8	10	18	0	4
Victor Hedman	Tampa Bay Lightning	23	2	16	18	+1	8
Alex Killorn	Tampa Bay Lightning	19	8	9	17	–1	6
Nick Suzuki	Montreal Canadiens	22	7	9	16	–6	2
William Karlsson	Vegas Golden Knights	19	4	12	16	+10	2
Nathan MacKinnon	Colorado Avalanche	10	8	7	15	+6	2
David Pastrnak	Boston Bruins	11	7	8	15	+3	8
Mathew Barzal	New York Islanders	19	6	8	14	0	19

=== Goaltenders ===
This is a combined table of the top five goaltenders based on goals against average and the top five goaltenders based on save percentage, with at least 420 minutes played. The table is sorted by GAA, and the criteria for inclusion are bolded.

Player	Team	GP	W	L	SA	GA	GAA	SV%	SO	TOI
Jack Campbell	Toronto Maple Leafs	7	3	4	197	13	**1.81**	**.934**	1	430:51
Andrei Vasilevskiy	Tampa Bay Lightning	23	16	7	699	44	**1.90**	**.937**	5	1,389:33
Marc-Andre Fleury	Vegas Golden Knights	16	9	7	403	33	**2.04**	.918	1	972:52
Alex Nedeljkovic	Carolina Hurricanes	9	4	5	275	22	**2.17**	.920	1	607:31
Connor Hellebuyck	Winnipeg Jets	8	4	4	289	20	**2.23**	**.931**	1	537:45
Carey Price	Montreal Canadiens	22	13	9	673	51	2.28	**.924**	1	1,341:38
Semyon Varlamov	New York Islanders	14	7	7	437	34	2.56	**.922**	0	797:26

== Media ==
=== Canada ===
This marked the seventh postseason under Rogers Media's 12-year contract. Games aired across Sportsnet, SN1, SN360, FX, and CBC under the Hockey Night in Canada brand. Games were also streamed on Sportsnet Now, CBCSports.ca (for games televised by CBC), or the subscription service Rogers NHL Live.

=== United States ===
This marked the final postseason under NBC Sports' 10-year contract for American television rights to the NHL. All national coverage of games were aired on either NBCSN, the NBC broadcast network, NHL Network, USA Network, or CNBC. During the first round, excluding games exclusively broadcast on NBC, the regional rights holders of each participating U.S. team produced local telecasts of their respective games. Peacock, NBC's streaming service, streamed all remaining games of the Stanley Cup playoffs starting on June 14.

=== Impact on production ===
As it had been done throughout the regular season due to COVID-19 protocols, the home broadcaster provided a neutral "world feed" to the other media partners for at the first two rounds: the home team's regional rightsholder during most first-round games in the U.S., NBC for the rest of the U.S. games, and Sportsnet for all games played in Canada.

Amazon Web Services debuted advanced shot and save analytics for the playoffs, taking data from the player and puck tracking technology that was first implemented at the start of the regular season. NBC used a redesigned score bug to display these new statistics.

Sportsnet's lead play-by-play voice Jim Hughson did not call any playoff games, having opted to work only nationally televised Vancouver Canucks home games during the regular season. Consequently, Chris Cuthbert joined lead colour commentator Craig Simpson on Sportsnet's lead broadcast team, calling the Canadiens–Maple Leafs series on-site for the first round, the Jets–Canadiens series in the second round, the Golden Knights–Canadiens series in the semifinals, and the entire 2021 Stanley Cup Final. Harnarayan Singh and Louie DeBrusk served as the secondary team, doing a similar role for the Oilers–Jets series. John Bartlett and Garry Galley served as the tertiary team, calling a select number of games from the West, Central, and East Division series inside the Sportsnet studios on CBC, while those broadcast on Sportsnet were simulcasts of NBC Sports' feeds.

After NBC's lead play-by-play voice Mike "Doc" Emrick retired at the end of the previous season, NBC split top play-by-play duties between Kenny Albert and John Forslund during the regular season. For the playoffs, Albert, Eddie Olczyk, and Brian Boucher served as the lead broadcast team while Forslund, Joe Micheletti, and Pierre McGuire served as the secondary team. Brendan Burke and A. J. Mleczko primarily served as the tertiary team. Rounding out NBC's broadcast crew were play-by-play voices Alex Faust, Ken Daniels, and John Walton, and analysts Keith Jones, Dominic Moore, and Jody Shelley. Most first-round games were called remotely, with a few others called on-site. For the second round, all games were called on-site except the Jets–Canadiens series. All games were called on-site starting with the semifinals.

Preceded by 2020 Stanley Cup playoffs	Stanley Cup playoffs 2021	Succeeded by 2022 Stanley Cup playoffs
