= Josh Bailey =

Canadian ice hockey player (born 1989)

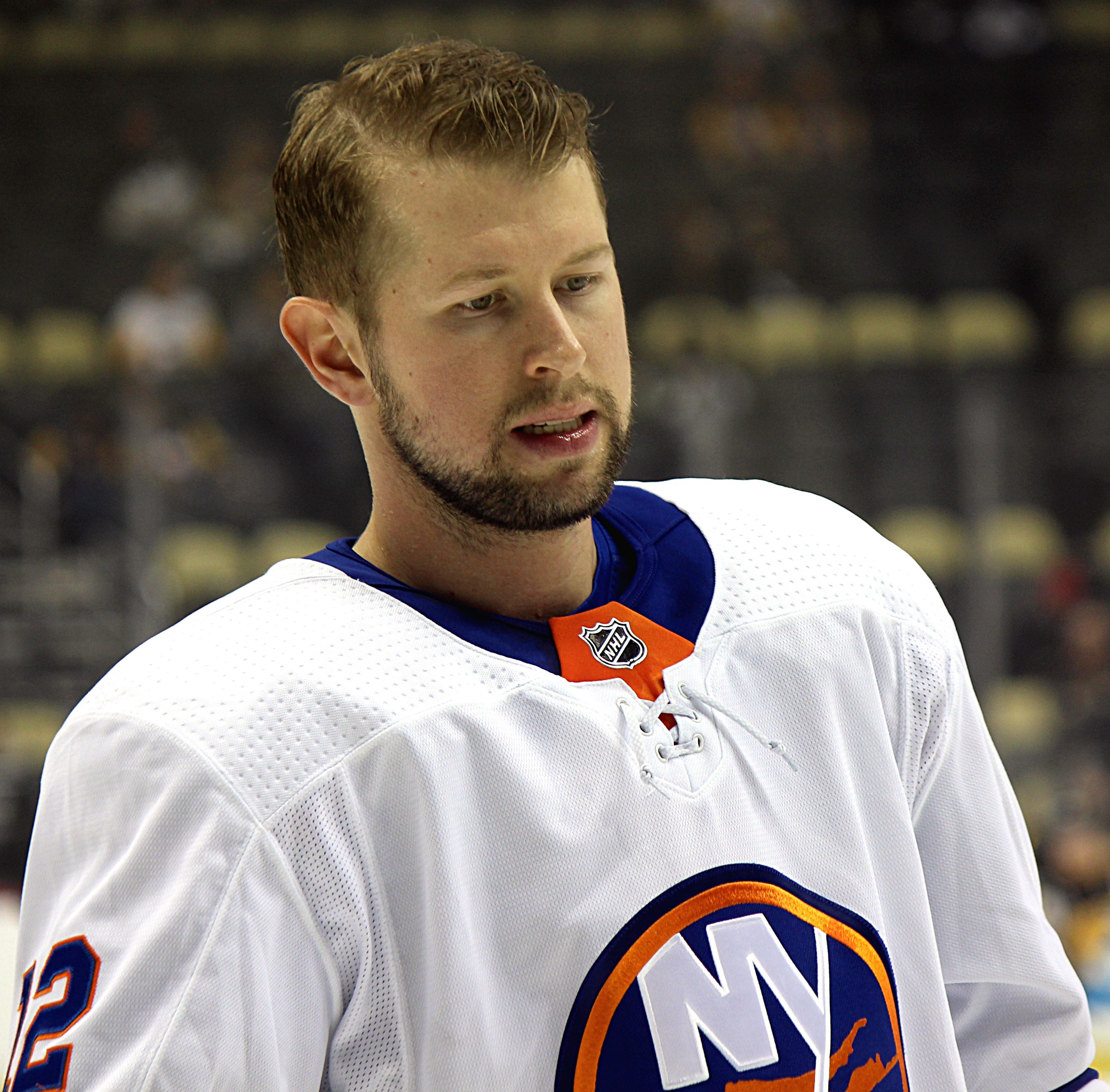
- Bailey with the New York Islanders in 2018
- Born: October 2, 1989 (age 37) Bowmanville, Ontario, Canada
- Height: 6 ft 1 in (185 cm)
- Weight: 200 lb (91 kg; 14 st 4 lb)
- Position: Right wing
- Shot: Left
- Played for: New York Islanders
- National team: Canada
- NHL draft: 9th overall, 2008; New York Islanders
- Playing career: 2008–2023

Joshua Bailey (born October 2, 1989) is a Canadian former professional ice hockey winger. He played 15 seasons in the National Hockey League (NHL) for the New York Islanders, who selected him ninth overall in the 2008 NHL entry draft.

== Early life ==
Bailey was born on October 2, 1989, in Bowmanville, Ontario, Canada to Chris and Donna Bailey.

== Playing career ==
=== Amateur and junior ===
Bailey grew up in Clarington, Ontario, playing AAA for the Clarington Toros of the Ontario Minor Hockey Association's (OMHA) Eastern AAA League. He was drafted in the first round of the Ontario Hockey League (OHL) priority selection by the Owen Sound Attack in May 2005. He played parts of two seasons with the Attack, scoring 18 goals and adding 34 assists. He was traded by the Attack to the Windsor Spitfires during the 2006–07 season. He played two seasons with the Spitfires. In the 2007–08 season, Bailey registered 29 goals and 96 points in 67 games.

=== Professional ===
Leading up to the 2008 NHL entry draft, Bailey was only offered interviews with the New York Islanders and Boston Bruins. While he started the 2007–08 season ranked 40th among all draft eligible skaters, he finished in the top 15. The NHL Central Scouting Bureau ranked him 14th overall North American skaters while the International Scouting Service placed him higher. Analysts for the NHL Central Scouting Bureau described Bailey as "a really hard-working, up-and-down guy who has great puck skills and playmaking ability." There was no consensus about Bailey's draft position as ESPN placed Bailey 13th overall, The Hockey News placed him 14th, and McKeens Hockey ranked him 11th. He was eventually selected ninth overall by the Islanders after they traded down twice in the draft to acquire him.

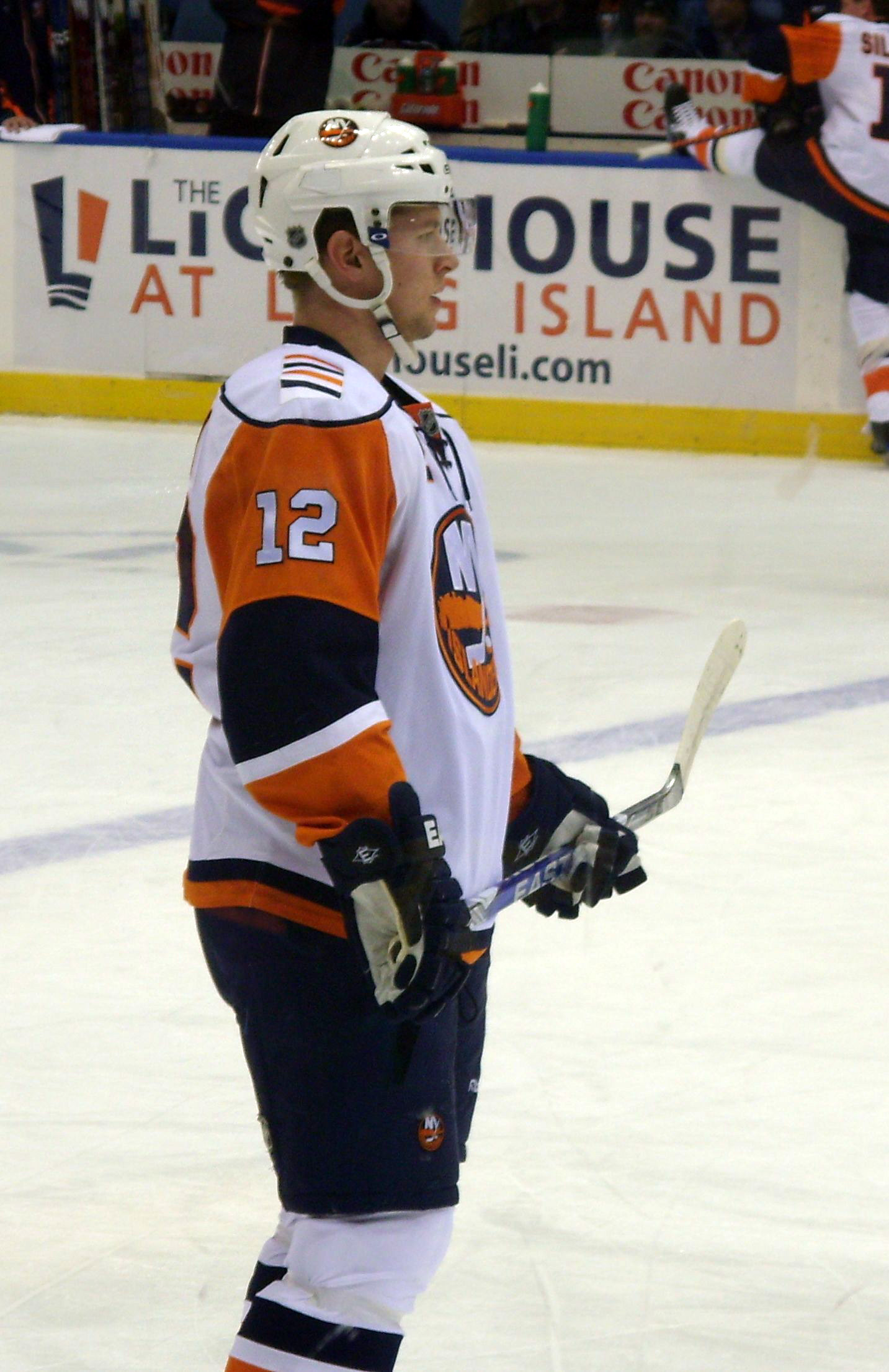
Bailey as a rookie with the Islanders in December 2008.

While attending the Islanders' training camp, Bailey signed a three-year entry-level contract with the team on his 19th birthday. Bailey and fellow rookie Kyle Okposo were placed on a line together at the Islanders' 2008 rookie camp, but Bailey's injury prohibited them from playing together at the start of the 2008–09 season. Despite only playing in two preseason games before suffering an injury, the Islanders chose to keep Bailey on their roster. He missed the first 14 games of the season before making his NHL debut on November 11, 2008 against the Philadelphia Flyers. He earned two minor penalties through 12:30 minutes of ice time. He joined Okposo's line in his second game of the season and recorded his first NHL point with an assist on Okposo's goal on November 13. Due to mounting injuries, head coach Scott Gordon chose to keep Bailey in the lineup for at least nine games. This was the maximum number of games a team was allowed to keep a player at the NHL level without burning the first year of their entry-level contract. On November 29, it was determined that Bailey would stay with the team for the remainder of the season. At the time, he had accumulated five assists through nine games. In his first game following the announcement, Bailey played a career-high 19 minutes and 50 seconds of ice time. However, as the Islanders went through a five-game losing streak, Bailey's playing time declined to a career-low of 12 minutes and four seconds. When asked about his ice time, Bailey said: "I can’t complain at all about the ice time. They have been so supportive and giving me all the opportunities. It’s up to me to bear down and play my best." He was initially credited with scoring his first NHL goal on December 26 before it was changed between periods to Bill Guerin. Bailey officially scored his first career NHL goal on January 2, 2009, against Ilya Bryzgalov of the Phoenix Coyotes. By mid-February, Bailey had scored two goals and 13 assists while playing on a line with fellow rookie Kyle Okposo. However, he then experienced a 15-game scoring slump before breaking it on March 8. Despite his lengthy scoring drought, he ranked fourth among the top-10 draft picks of 2009. Bailey finished the 2008–09 season with seven goals and 18 assists for 25 points through 68 games.

In the 2009 offseason, the Islanders drafted John Tavares first overall in the 2009 NHL entry draft. The Islanders began the 2009-10 season with six consecutive losses before earning their first win on October 21 against the Carolina Hurricanes. Bailey was made a healthy scratch for one game on November 13, 2009, although the reason was never released to the public. Upon returning to the Islanders lineup, he scored three goals and one assist through five games. In late December, Bailey was temporarily moved out of his natural centreman position and converted into a left winger. After scoring a goal on November 27, he experienced a month-long scoring drought before breaking the streak on December 29. Bailey improved his scoring at the start of January and recorded six points over six games. On April 9, in the third-last game of the season, Bailey suffered facial fractures after being boarded by Alexei Ponikarovsky of the Pittsburgh Penguins. As such, he was forced to miss the final two games of the season, and Ponikarovsky was suspended for two games. Bailey finished his sophomore season with a career-high 16 goals and 19 assists.

After a better start to the 2010–11 season, he was injured with a hip pointer, missing two games. Upon returning, he had no points in a 13-game stretch, prompting the Islanders to send Bailey to their American Hockey League (AHL) affiliate, the Bridgeport Sound Tigers, in late November. At this point in his career, Bailey was cited as an example of part of the nadir of the Islanders franchise. At the time of the demotion, Bailey had played 159 games, one less than the required tenure needed to clear waivers. Bailey played 11 games in the AHL and scored six goals and 11 assists before being brought back to the NHL in late December. In his first game back with the Islanders, he scored two goals and an assist to break his 14-game goalless drought. Bailey finished the season with the Islanders, registering 22 points in 52 games. On September 15, 2011, he signed a two-year contract with the Islanders.

With the 2012–13 NHL lockout in effect, Bailey was signed to a temporary lockout contract with German second division club SC Bietigheim Steelers on November 9, 2012. Bailey accumulated 11 points in six games with the Steelers before returning to North America. The Islanders announced on January 15, 2013, that they had suspended Bailey due to sustaining an injury while playing for the Steelers, and that he would not collect any pay from the team during the suspension. After the lockout ended, Bailey returned to the Islanders scoring 11 goals and 19 points in 38 games.

Bailey signed a five-year, $16.5 million contract with the Islanders on July 15, 2013. He finished the 2016–17 season with new career highs in goals (13) and points (56). During the 2017–18 season, Bailey scored his first career hat trick in a 6–4 loss to the Columbus Blue Jackets on December 14, 2017. Posting 18 goals and 53 assists for a career high 71 points, he was selected to his first NHL All-Star Game on January 10, 2018. On February 23, 2018, Bailey agreed to a six-year contract extension with the Islanders.

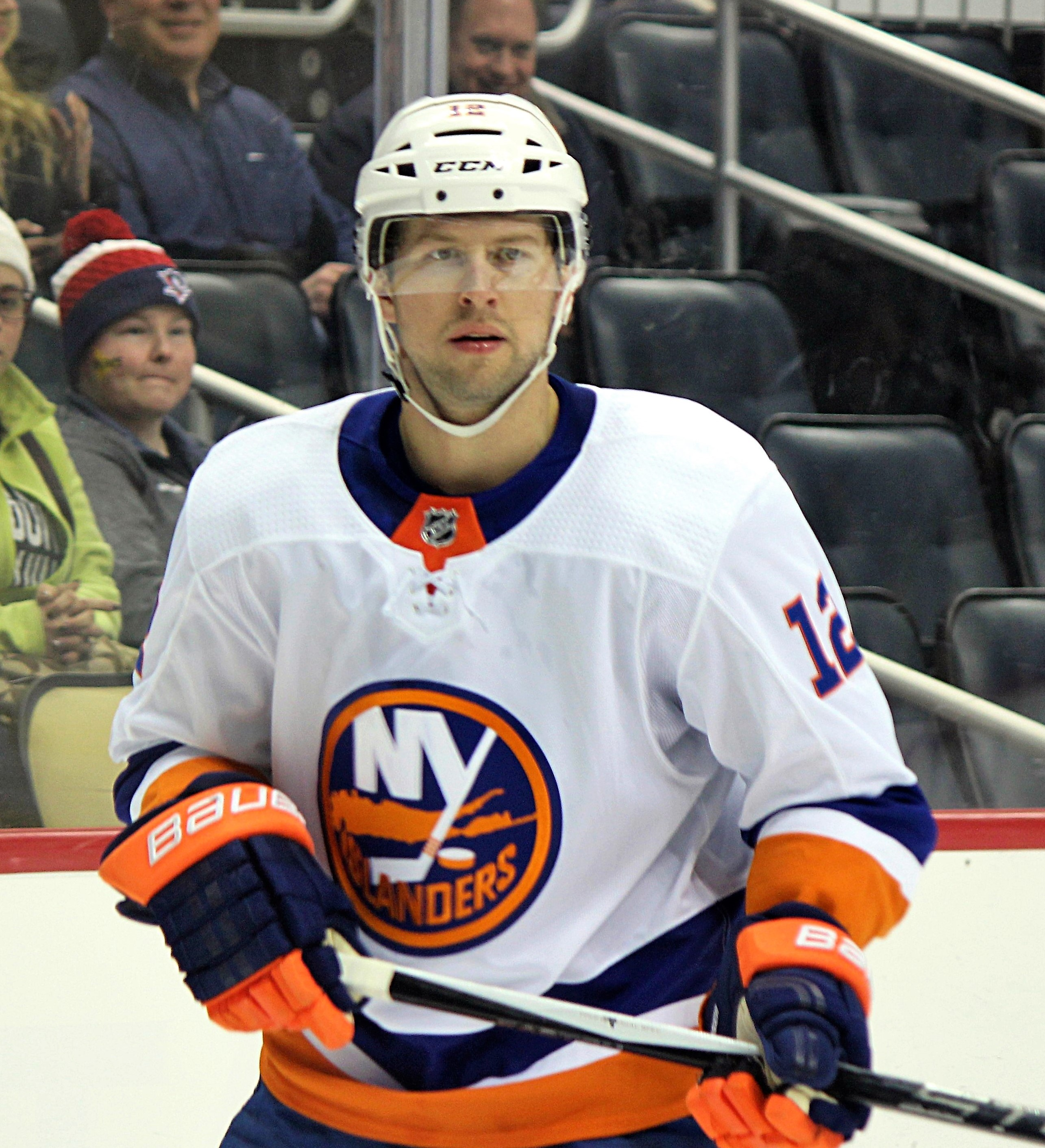
Bailey with the Islanders in December 2017

Bailey was named an alternate captain ahead of the 2018–19 season. On April 10, 2019, Bailey scored his first playoff NHL overtime winner against the Pittsburgh Penguins. He scored his second overtime winner on May 24, 2021, again against the Penguins, on a turnover from Pittsburgh goaltender Tristan Jarry.

On October 28, 2022, Bailey played his 1,000th NHL game against the Carolina Hurricanes and became only the third player from the Islanders to play all 1,000 games with the team. At this point, the view of Bailey as a player had improved among fans, though still "polarizing" to many. Bailey finished the 2022–23 season with eight goals and 25 points, his lowest total since his rookie season.

In the off-season, on June 29, 2023, Bailey was traded to the Chicago Blackhawks along with a 2026 second-round draft pick for future considerations as the Islanders intended to dump his contract on a team with more space under the salary cap. The Blackhawks immediately placed him on unconditional waivers with the intent of buying out his contract. Approximately two months later, on September 14, Bailey was signed to a professional tryout (PTO) agreement with the Ottawa Senators. He was released by the Senators from his PTO on October 8.

== International play ==
On April 16, 2018, Bailey replaced Vince Dunn on Canada's senior team at the 2018 IIHF World Championship.

== Personal life ==
Bailey married his fiancée Megan McTeague on July 3, 2015, in Toronto. They have three children together; two sons and one daughter.

== Career statistics ==
=== Regular season and playoffs ===
			Regular season					Playoffs
Season	Team	League	GP	G	A	Pts	PIM	GP	G	A	Pts	PIM
2004–05	Clarington Toros AAA	ETA U16	69	53	59	112	38	—	—	—	—	—
2004–05	Bowmanville Eagles	OPJHL	2	0	1	1	0	—	—	—	—	—
2005–06	Owen Sound Attack	OHL	55	7	19	26	8	11	0	0	0	0
2006–07	Owen Sound Attack	OHL	27	11	15	26	8	—	—	—	—	—
2006–07	Windsor Spitfires	OHL	42	11	24	35	16	—	—	—	—	—
2007–08	Windsor Spitfires	OHL	67	29	67	96	32	5	1	5	6	2
2008–09	New York Islanders	NHL	68	7	18	25	16	—	—	—	—	—
2009–10	New York Islanders	NHL	73	16	19	35	18	—	—	—	—	—
2010–11	New York Islanders	NHL	70	11	17	28	37	—	—	—	—	—
2010–11	Bridgeport Sound Tigers	AHL	11	6	11	17	4	—	—	—	—	—
2011–12	New York Islanders	NHL	80	13	19	32	32	—	—	—	—	—
2012–13	SC Bietigheim-Bissingen	2.GBun	6	3	8	11	16	—	—	—	—	—
2012–13	New York Islanders	NHL	38	11	8	19	6	6	0	3	3	0
2013–14	New York Islanders	NHL	77	8	30	38	26	—	—	—	—	—
2014–15	New York Islanders	NHL	70	15	26	41	12	7	2	3	5	0
2015–16	New York Islanders	NHL	81	12	20	32	22	9	2	1	3	2
2016–17	New York Islanders	NHL	82	13	43	56	12	—	—	—	—	—
2017–18	New York Islanders	NHL	76	18	53	71	17	—	—	—	—	—
2018–19	New York Islanders	NHL	82	16	40	56	21	8	4	2	6	0
2019–20	New York Islanders	NHL	68	14	29	43	10	22	2	18	20	0
2020–21	New York Islanders	NHL	54	8	27	35	4	19	6	7	13	4
2021–22	New York Islanders	NHL	74	14	30	44	6	—	—	—	—	—
2022–23	New York Islanders	NHL	64	8	17	25	2	—	—	—	—	—
NHL totals			1,057	184	396	580	241	71	16	34	50	6

=== International ===
Year	Team	Event	Result	GP	G	A	Pts	PIM
2006	Canada Ontario	U17	5th	5	0	1	1	0
2018	Canada	WC	4th	9	1	3	4	2
Junior totals				5	0	1	1	0
Senior totals				9	1	3	4	2

== See also ==
- List of NHL players with 1,000 games played

Awards and achievements
Preceded by Kyle Okposo	New York Islanders first round pick 2008	Succeeded by John Tavares
