= Anthony Cirelli =

Canadian ice hockey player (born 1997)

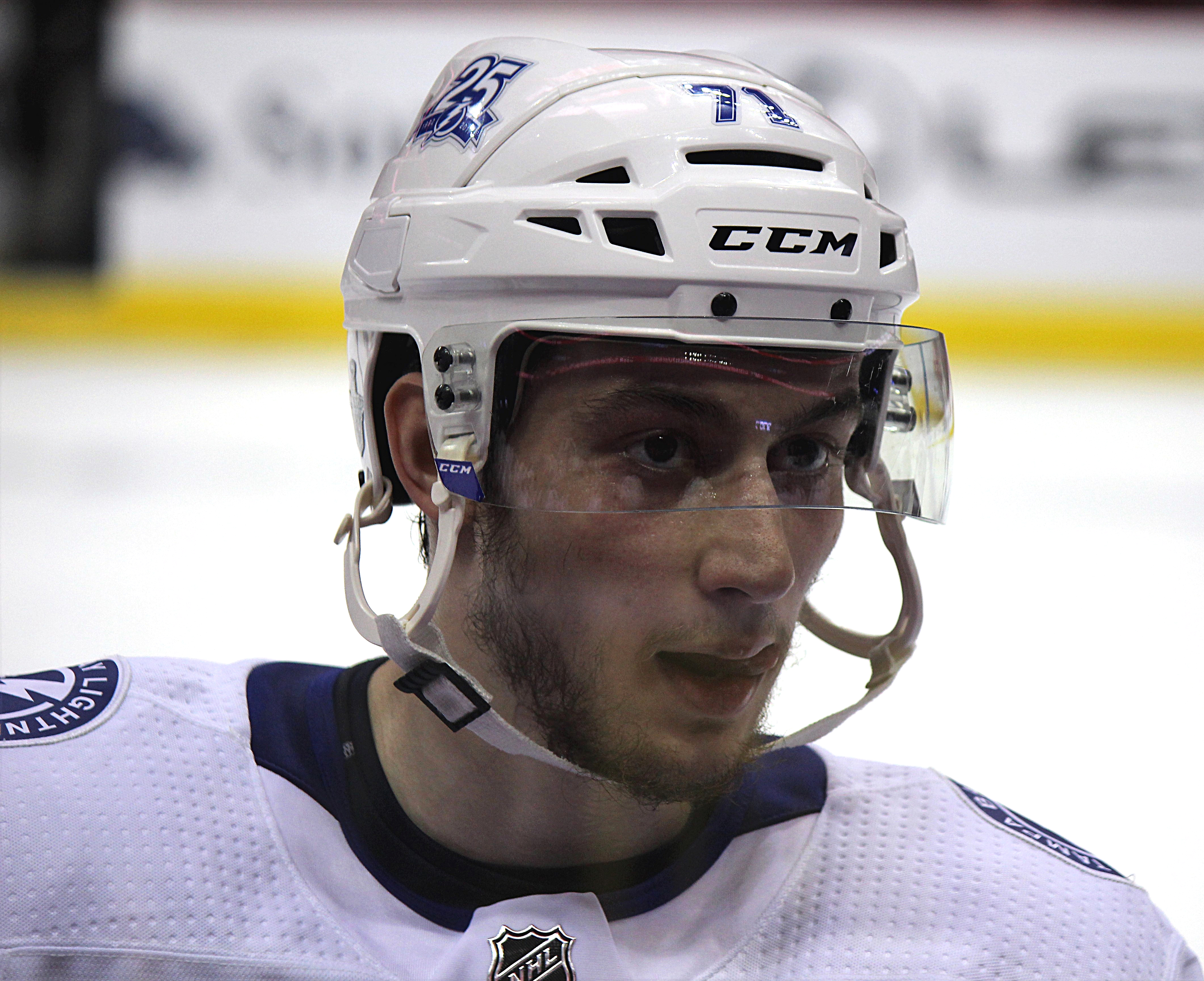
- Cirelli with the Tampa Bay Lightning in May 2018
- Born: July 15, 1997 (age 29) Woodbridge, Ontario, Canada
- Height: 6 ft 0 in (183 cm)
- Weight: 193 lb (88 kg; 13 st 11 lb)
- Position: Centre
- Shoots: Left
- NHL team: Tampa Bay Lightning
- National team: Canada
- NHL draft: 72nd overall, 2015; Tampa Bay Lightning
- Playing career: 2016–present

Anthony Cirelli (/sɪˈrɛli/, Italian: [tʃiˈrɛlli]; born July 15, 1997) is a Canadian professional ice hockey player who is a centre for the Tampa Bay Lightning of the National Hockey League (NHL). He was selected by the Lightning in the third round, 72nd overall, of the 2015 NHL entry draft. Cirelli won the Stanley Cup back-to-back with the Lightning in 2020 and 2021.

== Playing career ==
=== Juniors ===
Cirelli started his junior career with the Oshawa Generals of the Ontario Hockey League (OHL). Cirelli went undrafted in the OHL draft and ended up making the team as a walk-on. Cirelli scored the game-winning goal in overtime against the Kelowna Rockets in the 2015 Memorial Cup. On June 27, 2015, the Tampa Bay Lightning selected Cirelli 72nd overall in the 3rd round of the 2015 NHL entry draft. On January 28, 2016, Cirelli was named as captain of the Generals. On May 19, 2016, the Lightning signed Cirelli to a three-year entry-level contract.

On January 9, 2017, Cirelli was traded by the Oshawa Generals to the Erie Otters. Cirelli scored another championship clinching goal in overtime, the 2017 J. Ross Robertson Cup winning goal for the Otters in Game 5 of the OHL championship series against the Mississauga Steelheads . However, the Otters would ultimately fall in the championship game of the 2017 Memorial Cup tournament to the host Windsor Spitfires.

=== Professional ===
On March 1, 2018, Cirelli was recalled by the Tampa Bay Lightning from the Syracuse Crunch of the American Hockey League. Prior to his recall Cirelli was enjoying a productive rookie season with the Crunch. He had appeared in 51 games where he had 14-goals and 37 points. Cirelli would make his NHL debut that night against the Dallas Stars at American Airlines Center. Cirelli recorded his first career NHL goal and assist in the game, which resulted in a 5–4 overtime win. Cirelli also became only the fourth player in Lightning history to have a multiple point game in their NHL debut. On April 12, Cirelli made his NHL Stanley Cup Playoff debut in a 5–2 Lightning victory over the visiting New Jersey Devils. On April 21, Cirelli recorded his first career playoff assist and point in a 3–1 Lightning series clinching win over the New Jersey Devils. On May 2, he recorded his first career playoff goal in a 4–1 win over the Boston Bruins in Bruins' goaltender Tuukka Rask.

Building on his impressive overtime goal-scoring resume from his junior days, on September 17, 2020, he scored the winning goal in overtime of Game 6 of the Eastern Conference finals against the New York Islanders.

On December 24, 2020, Cirelli signed a three-year, $14.4 million contract with the Lightning.

On July 13, 2022, Cirelli signed an eight-year, $50 million contract extension with the Lightning. His teammates Mikhail Sergachev and Erik Černák also signed eight-year extensions on the same day.

In the 2024–25 season, Cirelli had 27 goals and 32 assists for 59 points in 80 games. He was named a finalist for the Frank J. Selke Trophy for the first time in his career, which went to Florida Panthers center and captain Aleksander Barkov.

He received a second consecutive Selke finalist honour for the 2025–26 season with the award ultimately going to Montreal Canadiens canter and captain Nick Suzuki.

== Personal life ==
Born in Woodbridge, Ontario, Cirelli is of Italian descent.

== International play ==
Medal record

Ice hockey

Representing Canada

World Championships
Silver medal – second place	2019 Slovakia	

4 Nations Face-Off
Winner	2025 Canada/United States	

World Junior Championships
Silver medal – second place	2017 Canada	

On April 29, 2019, Cirelli was selected to make his full international debut after he was named to the Team Canada roster for the 2019 IIHF World Championship, held in Slovakia. He helped Canada progress through to the playoff rounds before losing the final to Finland to finish with the silver medal on May 26, 2019. Cirelli finished the tournament posting 3 goals and 4 points in 10 games. Cirelli also participated in the 2017 World Junior Championship with Canada, winning a silver medal.

On December 31, 2025, he was named to Canada's roster to compete at the 2026 Winter Olympics.

== Career statistics ==
=== Regular season and playoffs ===
			Regular season					Playoffs
Season	Team	League	GP	G	A	Pts	PIM	GP	G	A	Pts	PIM
2014–15	Oshawa Generals	OHL	68	13	23	36	22	21	2	8	10	0
2015–16	Oshawa Generals	OHL	62	21	38	59	27	5	2	3	5	0
2015–16	Syracuse Crunch	AHL	3	0	0	0	0	—	—	—	—	—
2016–17	Oshawa Generals	OHL	26	13	21	34	8	—	—	—	—	—
2016–17	Erie Otters	OHL	25	12	18	30	4	22	15	16	31	4
2016–17	Syracuse Crunch	AHL	—	—	—	—	—	6	0	0	0	6
2017–18	Syracuse Crunch	AHL	51	14	23	37	14	—	—	—	—	—
2017–18	Tampa Bay Lightning	NHL	18	5	6	11	6	17	2	1	3	4
2018–19	Tampa Bay Lightning	NHL	82	19	20	39	34	4	1	1	2	0
2019–20	Tampa Bay Lightning	NHL	68	16	28	44	30	25	3	6	9	2
2020–21	Tampa Bay Lightning	NHL	50	9	13	22	10	23	5	7	12	20
2021–22	Tampa Bay Lightning	NHL	76	17	26	43	70	23	3	5	8	8
2022–23	Tampa Bay Lightning	NHL	58	11	18	29	33	6	3	3	6	4
2023–24	Tampa Bay Lightning	NHL	79	20	25	45	38	5	0	2	2	0
2024–25	Tampa Bay Lightning	NHL	80	27	32	59	28	5	1	0	1	18
2025–26	Tampa Bay Lightning	NHL	71	23	29	52	48	7	0	2	2	2
NHL totals			511	124	168	292	249	115	18	27	45	58

=== International ===
Year	Team	Event	Result	GP	G	A	Pts	PIM
2017	Canada	WJC	2nd place, silver medalist(s)	7	3	4	7	2
2019	Canada	WC	2nd place, silver medalist(s)	10	3	1	4	6
2025	Canada	4NF	1st place, gold medalist(s)	4	0	0	0	0
Junior totals				7	3	4	7	2
Senior totals				14	3	1	4	6

== Awards and honours ==
Award	Year
CHL
Memorial Cup champion	2015
Memorial Cup Most Sportsmanlike player	2017
NHL
NHL All-Rookie Team	2019
Stanley Cup champion	2020, 2021
