= Ben Chiarot =

Canadian ice hockey player (born 1991)

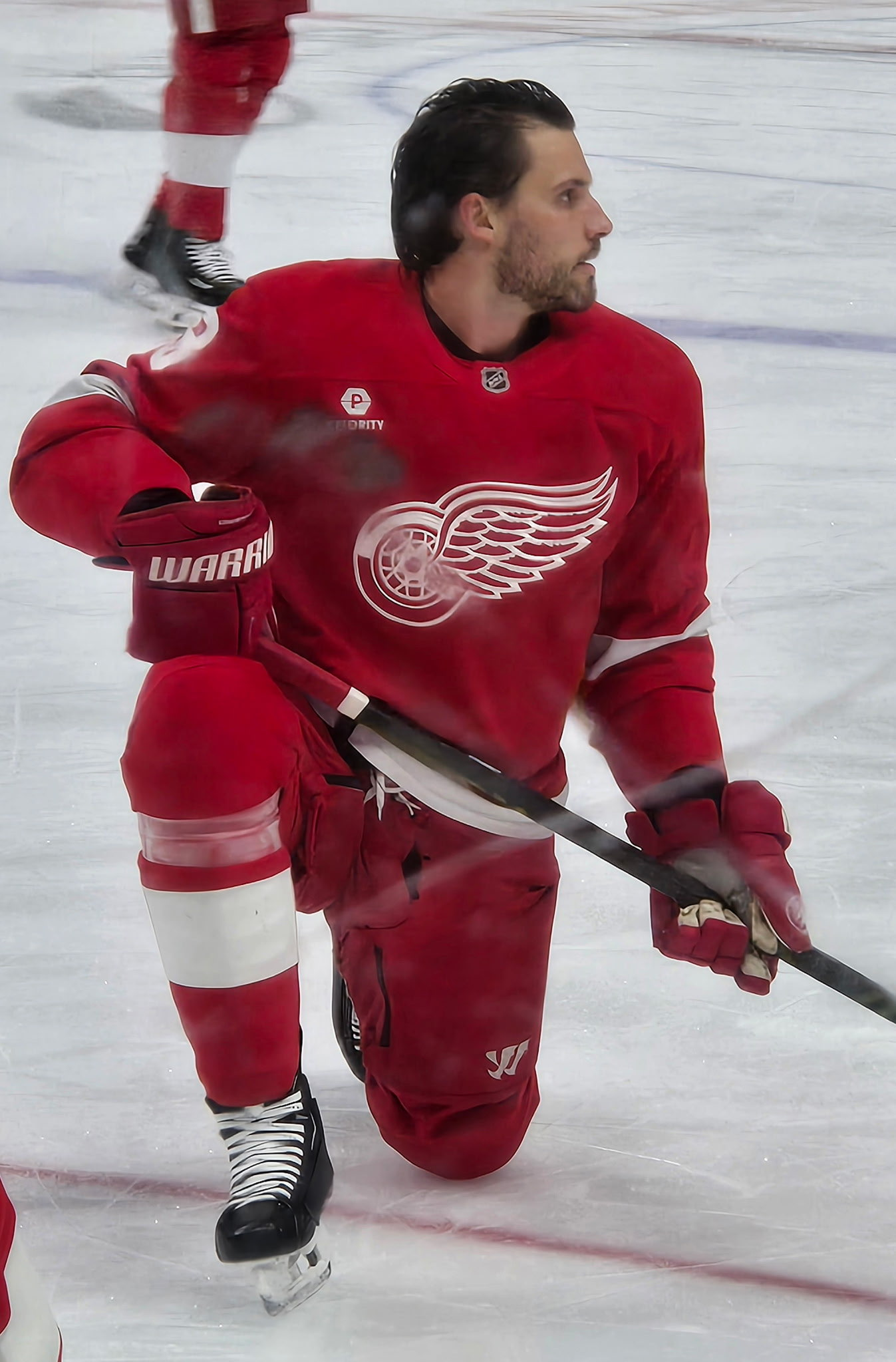
- Chiarot with the Detroit Red Wings in 2025
- Born: May 9, 1991 (age 35) Hamilton, Ontario, Canada
- Height: 6 ft 3 in (191 cm)
- Weight: 234 lb (106 kg; 16 st 10 lb)
- Position: Defence
- Shoots: Left
- NHL team Former teams: Detroit Red Wings; Winnipeg Jets; Montreal Canadiens; Florida Panthers
- NHL draft: 120th overall, 2009; Atlanta Thrashers
- Playing career: 2010–present

Ben Chiarot (born May 9, 1991) is a Canadian professional ice hockey player who is a defenceman for the Detroit Red Wings of the National Hockey League (NHL). He was selected in the fourth round, 120th overall, by the Atlanta Thrashers in the 2009 NHL entry draft. Chiarot has previously played for the Winnipeg Jets, Montreal Canadiens and Florida Panthers.

== Early life ==
Chiarot was born on May 9, 1991, in Hamilton, Ontario, to Tara and Matt Chiarot. Canadian football ran in the Chiarot family: his grandfather Gord played for the Hamilton Tiger-Cats and BC Lions of the Canadian Football League, while his father and uncle played college football for McMaster University. Chiarot's father refused to allow him to play football as a child, however, and he focused on ice hockey instead. Chiarot played minor ice hockey as a defenceman for the Mississauga IceDogs of the Greater Toronto Hockey League. In his final season with the team, he recorded 22 goals and 64 points in 75 regular season games, as well as five points in seven OHL Cup games.

== Playing career ==
=== Junior ===
Chiarot played major junior hockey in the Ontario Hockey League (OHL) with the Guelph Storm, Sudbury Wolves, and Saginaw Spirit.

=== Professional ===
==== Winnipeg Jets ====
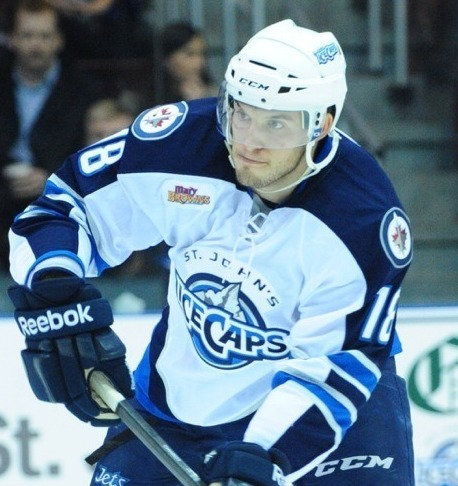
Chiarot with the St. John's IceCaps in 2013.

He was selected by the Atlanta Thrashers in the 4th round (120th overall) of the 2009 NHL entry draft, and made his professional debut in the American Hockey League with the Chicago Wolves during the 2009–10 season. On March 16, 2011, the Atlanta Thrashers signed Chiarot to an entry-level contract. On July 23, 2014, Chiarot signed a two-way deal, worth $600,000 with the Jets, after a strong campaign with the St. John's IceCaps of the American Hockey League. Chiarot scored his first NHL goal on January 3, 2015, in a 5-1 win over the Toronto Maple Leafs.

On June 18, 2015, the Winnipeg Jets resigned Chiarot to a two-year, $1.7 million contract extension.

On June 24, 2017, the Jets re-signed Chiarot to a two-year, $2.8 million contract extension with an annual average of $1.4 million.

==== Montreal Canadiens ====
After spending the first eight seasons of his professional career within the Thrashers/Jets franchise, Chiarot left as a free agent following the 2018–19 season to a sign a three-year, $10.5 million contract with the Montreal Canadiens on July 4, 2019. Later, on October 9, 2019, Chiarot scored his first goal with Montreal in a 5-4 overtime loss to the Buffalo Sabres. In his first season in Montreal, he managed a new personal best of 9 goals and 12 assists in 69 games.

While playing with the Canadiens over the course of the contract, Chiarot assumed an increasingly prominent role in their defense corps, notably participating in the team's deep run to the 2021 Stanley Cup Finals, where they lost to the Tampa Bay Lightning. He led the Canadiens in ice time during the playoffs. He later remarked "getting to the Finals is the pinnacle of what hockey is when you're playing for the Stanley Cup and it's down to two teams. I'll always be grateful that I had that experience because it's not one that everybody gets."

Entering the final season of his contract, he became the subject of increasing speculation that he would be traded before the deadline in order to secure the Canadiens more picks in the 2022 NHL entry draft. Chiarot recorded 18 points in 54 games with the Canadiens, the last being an assist on the game-tying shorthanded goal in the final minute of the third period of a March 13 game against the Philadelphia Flyers, leading to a 4–3 Canadiens victory in overtime. On March 15, coach Martin St. Louis announced that he would sit out the remaining games in advance of the trade deadline to avoid injury.

==== Florida Panthers ====
On March 16, 2022, Chiarot was traded by the Canadiens to the Florida Panthers, for prospect Tyler Smilanic, a 2023 first-round pick, and a 2022 fourth-round pick. Following the trade, Chiarot remained in Montreal rather than joining the team on the road, and made his debut with the club on March 24 in a game against the Canadiens. He registered his first assist with the team in the game, contributing to a 4–3 Panthers victory. The Panthers won the Presidents' Trophy with the best regular season record in the NHL, and qualified for the 2022 Stanley Cup playoffs. Chiarot assumed a prominent role in the Panthers' defense during their first round series against the Washington Capitals, where they prevailed 4 games to 2, advancing to the second round for the first time in a quarter century. Chariot was fined for head-butting Tampa Bay Lightning forward Ross Colton in Game 1 of the second round. The Panthers were swept by the Lightning, bringing their playoffs to an end.

==== Detroit Red Wings ====
On July 13, 2022, Chiarot signed a four-year, $19 million contract with the Detroit Red Wings. On January 29th, 2026, Chiarot scored the goal that put teammate Patrick Kane 1st on the all-times point list by an American-born player. It was only the day after Chiarot signed a 3-year extension with the Wings.

On April 5, 2026, against the Minnesota Wild in a 5-4 loss, Chiarot played in his 800th career game.

== Career statistics ==
			Regular season					Playoffs
Season	Team	League	GP	G	A	Pts	PIM	GP	G	A	Pts	PIM
2006–07	Mississauga IceDogs AAA	GTHL U16	75	22	42	64	202	—	—	—	—	—
2007–08	Guelph Storm	OHL	31	0	0	0	14	—	—	—	—	—
2008–09	Guelph Storm	OHL	67	2	10	12	111	4	0	3	3	8
2009–10	Guelph Storm	OHL	41	4	9	13	106	—	—	—	—	—
2009–10	Sudbury Wolves	OHL	26	4	4	8	61	4	1	0	1	6
2009–10	Chicago Wolves	AHL	1	0	0	0	4	—	—	—	—	—
2010–11	Sudbury Wolves	OHL	25	5	8	13	62	—	—	—	—	—
2010–11	Saginaw Spirit	OHL	39	5	19	24	51	12	1	4	5	21
2011–12	St. John's IceCaps	AHL	18	1	1	2	19	—	—	—	—	—
2011–12	Colorado Eagles	ECHL	24	6	7	13	13	—	—	—	—	—
2012–13	St. John's IceCaps	AHL	61	1	11	12	81	—	—	—	—	—
2013–14	St. John's IceCaps	AHL	65	6	14	20	96	21	2	3	5	16
2013–14	Winnipeg Jets	NHL	1	0	0	0	0	—	—	—	—	—
2014–15	St. John's IceCaps	AHL	24	4	5	9	21	—	—	—	—	—
2014–15	Winnipeg Jets	NHL	40	2	6	8	22	2	0	0	0	2
2015–16	Winnipeg Jets	NHL	70	1	9	10	43	—	—	—	—	—
2016–17	Winnipeg Jets	NHL	59	2	10	12	33	—	—	—	—	—
2017–18	Winnipeg Jets	NHL	57	2	12	14	32	16	0	3	3	15
2018–19	Winnipeg Jets	NHL	78	5	15	20	62	6	0	0	0	0
2019–20	Montreal Canadiens	NHL	69	9	12	21	61	10	0	2	2	12
2020–21	Montreal Canadiens	NHL	41	1	6	7	50	22	1	1	2	16
2021–22	Montreal Canadiens	NHL	54	7	11	18	42	—	—	—	—	—
2021–22	Florida Panthers	NHL	20	2	6	8	6	10	0	1	1	8
2022–23	Detroit Red Wings	NHL	76	5	14	19	51	—	—	—	—	—
2023–24	Detroit Red Wings	NHL	77	5	15	20	56	—	—	—	—	—
2024–25	Detroit Red Wings	NHL	81	4	9	13	69	—	—	—	—	—
2025–26	Detroit Red Wings	NHL	82	5	10	15	75	—	—	—	—	—
NHL totals			805	50	135	185	602	66	1	7	8	53
