= Jan Rutta =

Czech ice hockey player (born 1990)

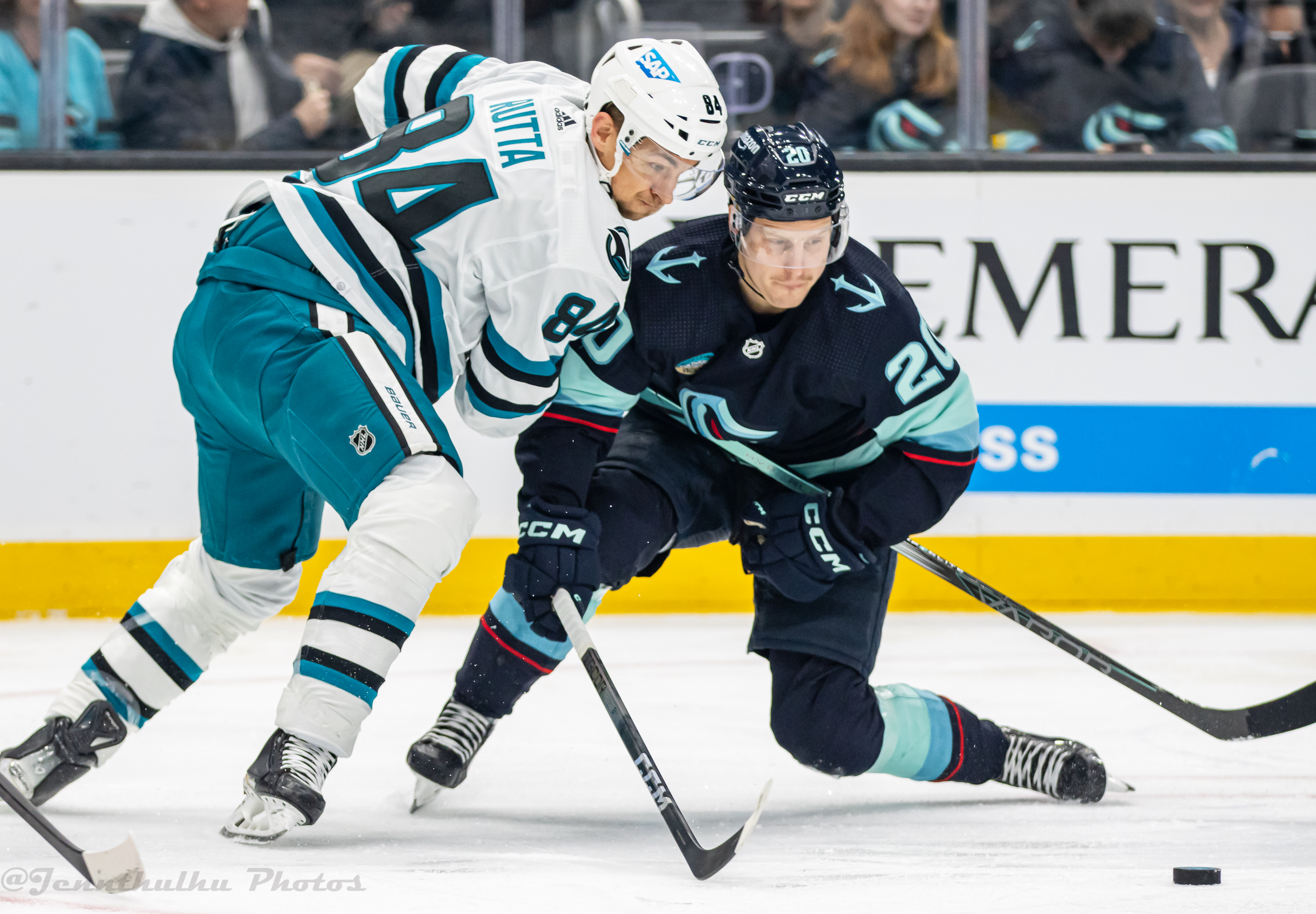
- Jan Rutta and Eeli Tolvanen in November 2023
- Born: 29 July 1990 (age 35) Písek, Czechoslovakia
- Height: 6 ft 3 in (191 cm)
- Weight: 204 lb (93 kg; 14 st 8 lb)
- Position: Defence
- Shoots: Right
- NL team Former teams: Genève-Servette HC; Piráti Chomutov; Chicago Blackhawks; Tampa Bay Lightning; Pittsburgh Penguins; San Jose Sharks
- National team: Czech Republic
- NHL draft: Undrafted
- Playing career: 2008–present

Jan Rutta (born 29 July 1990) is a Czech professional ice hockey player who is a defenceman for Genève-Servette HC of the National League (NL). Originally an undrafted player, he won back-to-back Stanley Cups with the Tampa Bay Lightning in 2020 and 2021. Rutta has also previously played for the Chicago Blackhawks, Pittsburgh Penguins and San Jose Sharks.

== Playing career ==
Rutta made his Czech Extraliga debut playing with Piráti Chomutov debut during the 2012–13 Czech Extraliga season.

After seven seasons with Chomutov, Rutta left the Czech Republic in signing a one-year contract with the Chicago Blackhawks of the NHL on 8 June 2017. After attending his first training camp with the Blackhawks, Rutta made the opening night roster for the 2017–18 season. On 9 October, Rutta scored his first NHL goal against goaltender Frederik Andersen in a game against the Toronto Maple Leafs. Rutta secured a blueline role within the Blackhawks during the season, and on 8 March 2018, was signed to a one-year $2.25 million extension. With the Blackhawks missing the postseason, Rutta appeared in 57 games while adding offensively with six goals and 14 assists for 20 points.

In the following the 2018–19 season, with the Blackhawks continuing to struggle out of the gate, Rutta was placed on waivers after contributing with two goals and six points in 23 games on 23 December 2018. After clearing he was assigned to AHL affiliate, the Rockford IceHogs. On 11 January 2019, Rutta was traded by the Blackhawks, along with a 2019 seventh-round pick to the Tampa Bay Lightning in exchange for Slater Koekkoek and a 2019 fifth-round pick. He was slated to continue in the AHL with the Lightning's affiliate, the Syracuse Crunch. On 9 March, Rutta made his debut with the Lightning in a 3–2 win over the Detroit Red Wings at Amalie Arena. He played out the tail end of the regular season with the League leading Lightning, posting 2 assists in 14 games. He maintained his place in the lineup through the playoffs, recording 2 assists in a four-game series sweep defeat to the Columbus Blue Jackets. On 4 May, Rutta was re-signed to a one-year, $1.3 million contract extension to continue with the Lightning.

During the 2020–21 season, on 15 June 2021, Rutta scored his first career NHL playoff goal in the Lightning's 4–2 win against the New York Islanders.

Following four seasons within the Lightning organization, Rutta left as a free agent and was signed to a three-year, $8.25 million contract with the Pittsburgh Penguins on 13 July 2022.

After just one season in Pittsburgh, Rutta was traded to the San Jose Sharks on 6 August 2023, as part of a three-team package deal for Erik Karlsson.

Following eight NHL seasons, on 25 August 2025, Rutta left North America as a free agent and was signed to a two-year contract with Genève-Servette HC of the Swiss NL.

== International play ==
Medal record

Representing Czech Republic

Ice hockey

World Championships
Gold medal – first place	2024 Czechia	

Rutta represented Czechia at the 2024 IIHF World Championship and won a gold medal.

== Career statistics ==
=== Regular season and playoffs ===
			Regular season					Playoffs
Season	Team	League	GP	G	A	Pts	PIM	GP	G	A	Pts	PIM
2008–09	KLH Chomutov	Czech.1	2	0	0	0	0	—	—	—	—	—
2008–09	SK Kadaň	Czech.1	2	0	0	0	0	—	—	—	—	—
2008–09	IHC Písek	Czech.2	2	0	0	0	0	—	—	—	—	—
2009–10	SK Kadaň	Czech.1	18	1	4	5	0	9	0	3	3	0
2009–10	HC Klašterec nad Ohři	Czech.2	3	0	1	1	0	5	0	0	0	4
2010–11	KLH Chomutov	Czech.1	24	0	0	0	10	—	—	—	—	—
2011–12	Piráti Chomutov	Czech.1	48	2	6	8	16	12	1	4	5	6
2012–13	Piráti Chomutov	ELH	37	1	3	4	18	—	—	—	—	—
2012–13	SK Kadaň	Czech.1	7	0	3	3	0	—	—	—	—	—
2013–14	Piráti Chomutov	ELH	17	1	2	3	4	—	—	—	—	—
2013–14	SK Kadaň	Czech.1	18	1	3	4	8	—	—	—	—	—
2014–15	Piráti Chomutov	Czech.1	50	11	16	27	28	22	5	7	12	46
2015–16	Piráti Chomutov	ELH	44	10	11	21	22	7	1	2	3	8
2016–17	Piráti Chomutov	ELH	46	8	24	32	30	17	2	11	13	8
2017–18	Chicago Blackhawks	NHL	57	6	14	20	24	—	—	—	—	—
2018–19	Chicago Blackhawks	NHL	23	2	4	6	12	—	—	—	—	—
2018–19	Rockford IceHogs	AHL	8	1	3	4	2	—	—	—	—	—
2018–19	Syracuse Crunch	AHL	18	3	5	8	10	—	—	—	—	—
2018–19	Tampa Bay Lightning	NHL	14	0	2	2	4	4	0	2	2	0
2019–20	Tampa Bay Lightning	NHL	33	1	6	7	14	5	0	1	1	12
2020–21	Tampa Bay Lightning	NHL	35	0	8	8	22	23	2	1	3	8
2021–22	Tampa Bay Lightning	NHL	76	3	15	18	47	17	1	4	5	17
2022–23	Pittsburgh Penguins	NHL	56	3	6	9	30	—	—	—	—	—
2023–24	San Jose Sharks	NHL	69	5	14	19	38	—	—	—	—	—
2024–25	San Jose Sharks	NHL	54	3	6	9	28	—	—	—	—	—
ELH totals			144	20	40	60	74	24	3	13	16	16
NHL totals			417	23	75	98	219	49	3	8	11	37

=== International ===
Year	Team	Event	Result	GP	G	A	Pts	PIM
2008	Czech Republic	U18-D1	11th	5	0	0	0	0
2017	Czech Republic	WC	7th	8	1	0	1	0
2019	Czech Republic	WC	4th	10	1	2	3	4
2024	Czechia	WC	1st place, gold medalist(s)	9	1	0	1	8
2026	Czechia	OG	8th	3	0	1	1	4
Junior totals				5	0	0	0	0
Senior totals				30	3	3	6	16

== Awards and honors ==
Award	Year	Ref
NHL
Stanley Cup champion	2020, 2021	
