= Brayden Point =

Canadian ice hockey player (born 1996)

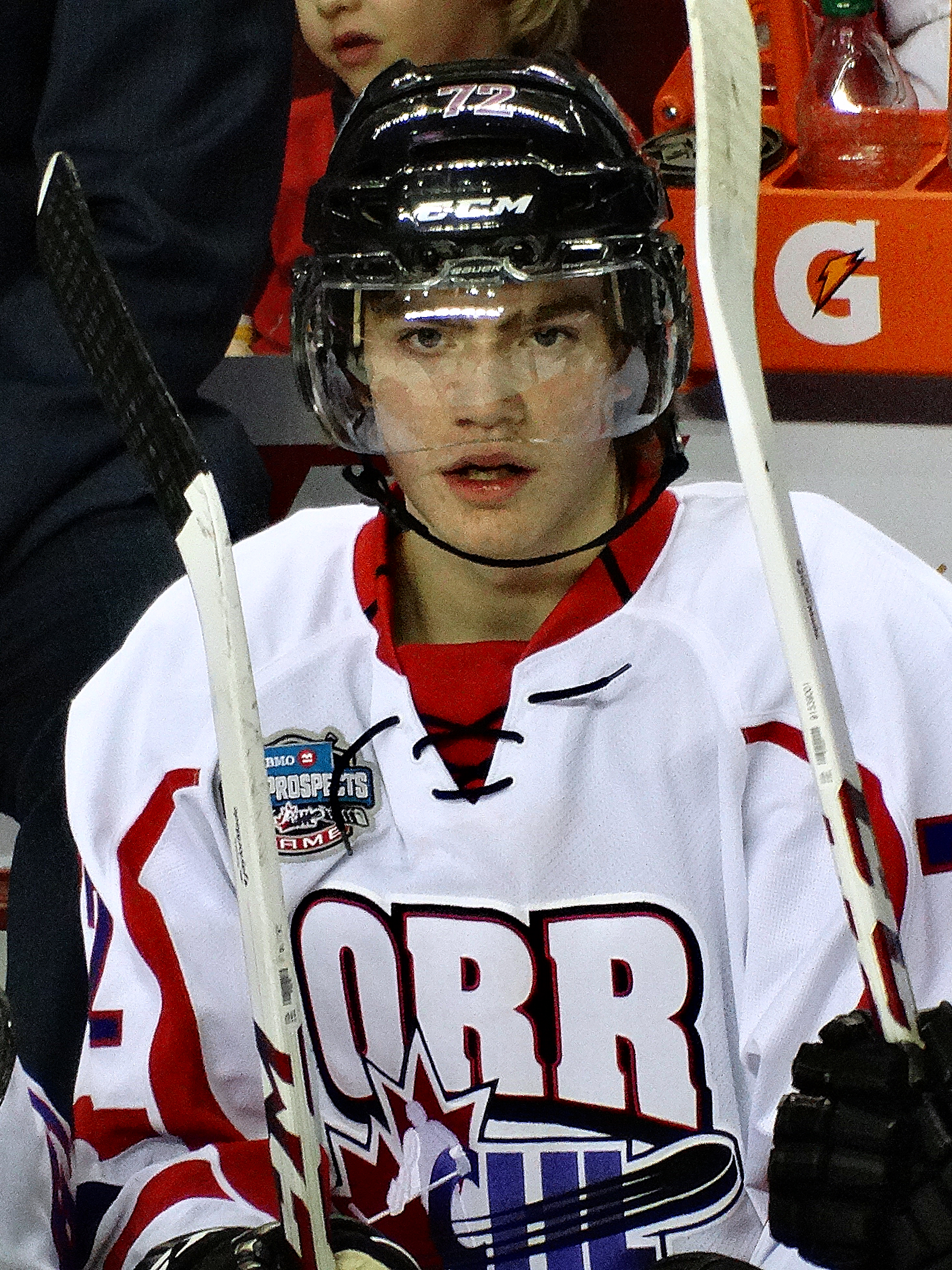
- Point at the CHL/NHL Top Prospects Game in 2014
- Born: March 13, 1996 (age 30) Calgary, Alberta, Canada
- Height: 5 ft 11 in (180 cm)
- Weight: 177 lb (80 kg; 12 st 9 lb)
- Position: Centre
- Shoots: Right
- NHL team: Tampa Bay Lightning
- National team: Canada
- NHL draft: 79th overall, 2014; Tampa Bay Lightning
- Playing career: 2015–present

Brayden Point (born March 13, 1996) is a Canadian professional ice hockey player who is a centre for the Tampa Bay Lightning of the National Hockey League (NHL). The Lightning selected Point in the third round, 79th overall of the 2014 NHL entry draft. Point won the Stanley Cup back-to-back with the Lightning in 2020 and 2021, leading the playoffs in goal-scoring both times, including scoring the Stanley Cup-clinching goal of the 2020 Stanley Cup Final.

== Playing career ==
=== Major junior career ===
Point was drafted in the first round, fourteenth overall by the Moose Jaw Warriors of the 2011 Western Hockey League (WHL) Bantam Draft. In his first full season with the club, he scored 24 goals and 57 points in 67 games. At the conclusion of the season, Point was selected in the fifth round, 167th overall by Traktor Chelyabinsk in the 2013 KHL Junior Draft.

In his NHL draft year, Point led the Warriors in scoring with 36 goals and 91 points in 72 games. His play was rewarded by his participation in the 2014 CHL/NHL Top Prospects Game. Point was ranked 31st among North American skaters by the NHL Central Scouting Services. He was drafted in the third round, 79th overall by the Tampa Bay Lightning in the 2014 NHL entry draft.

Point returned to the Warriors for the 2014–15 season, where he once again led the team in scoring. On March 26, 2015, the Lightning signed Point to a three-year, entry-level contract. At the conclusion of the season, Point joined the Lightning's American Hockey League (AHL) affiliate, the Syracuse Crunch. In nine games for the Crunch, he recorded two goals and two assists. He also went scoreless in two postseason games.

In his final year with the Warriors, Point had 35 goals and 88 points in 48 games.

=== Tampa Bay Lightning (2016–present) ===
On October 11, 2016, the Tampa Bay Lightning announced that Point had made the opening night roster out of training camp. Point had had an impressive training camp, recording three preseason goals. Lightning centre and captain Steven Stamkos stated that he believed Point deserved to play in the NHL. Lightning general manager Steve Yzerman stated that the team "felt like he's earned the right for us to give him a look right off the bat." On October 13, Point made his NHL debut in a 6–4 Lightning win over the visiting Detroit Red Wings. On October 15, Point recorded his first NHL point, which came when he assisted on Valtteri Filppula's game winner in the 3rd period. The win came against the visiting New Jersey Devils. On October 18, Point recorded his first NHL shootout goal on his first attempt against goaltender James Reimer of the Florida Panthers. In doing so, Point became the 27th player to score in the shootout before their first career NHL goal. Additionally, he became just the thirteenth player to get the shootout decider before their first career goal. On November 5, Point recorded his first career NHL goal in a 4–1 win over the visiting New Jersey Devils. The goal came on the power play off a redirection of a Nikita Kucherov slap shot, which beat Devils' goaltender Cory Schneider. On December 29, the Lightning announced that Point would miss the next 4–6 weeks with an upper body injury. The injury was sustained in a game against the Montreal Canadiens the night before. On January 31, 2017, Point returned to the lineup against the Boston Bruins. On April 10, Point was named the NHL Third Star of the Week.

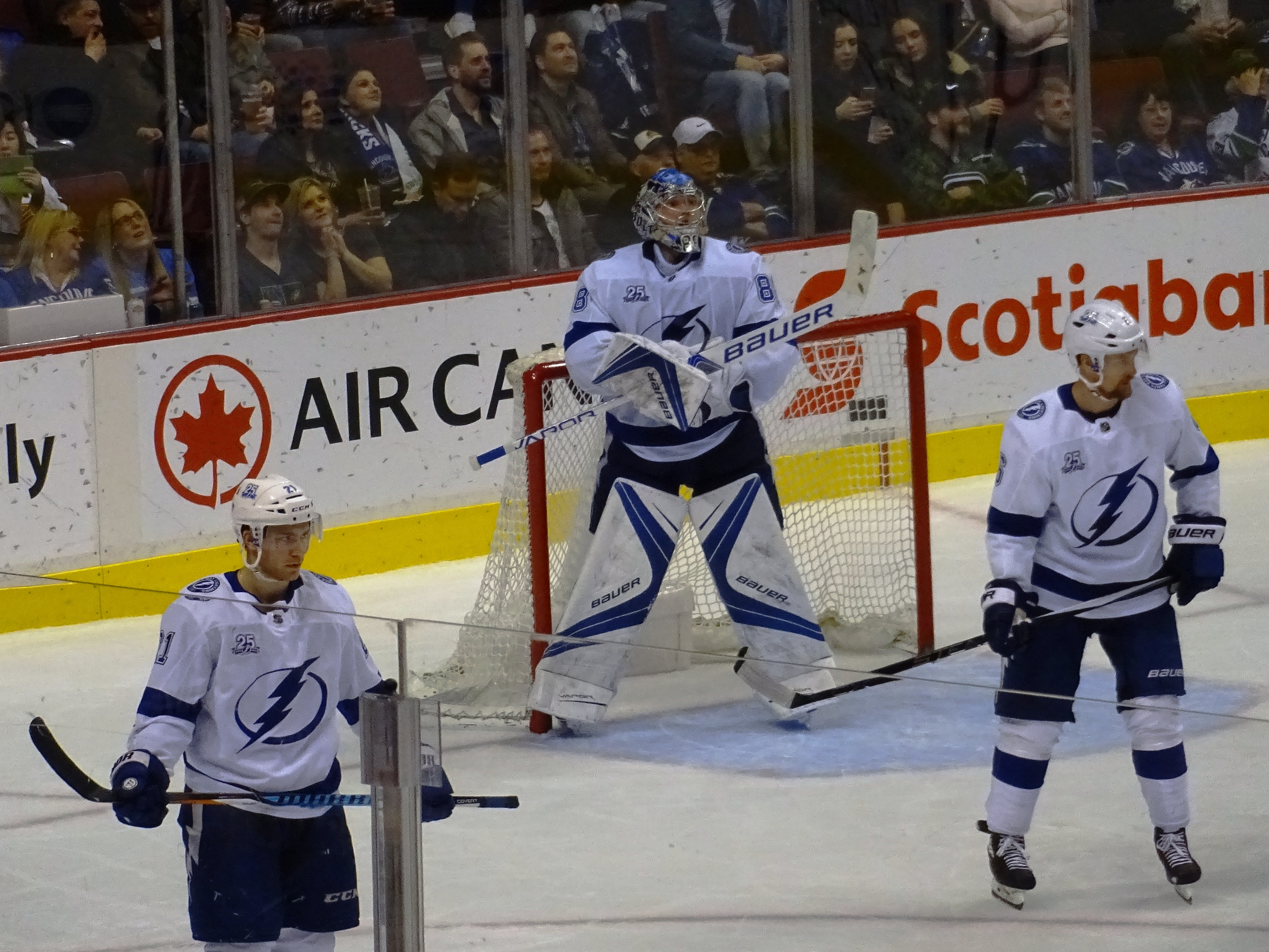
Point (left) with Andrei Vasilevskiy and Anton Strålman in February 2018

On January 24, 2018, Point was named to the 2018 NHL All-Star Game. Point replaced injured teammate Victor Hedman. This was Point's first selection to the All-Star Game. After the All-Star break, Point was the 3rd highest scorer on his team, and the top game-winning goal scorer, with 10 goals. On April 12, Point appeared in his first career NHL Stanley Cup playoff game in the first game in the first round of the 2018 playoffs, a 5–2 Lightning win over the visiting New Jersey Devils. Point recorded his first career playoff assist and point in the Lightning victory. On April 14, Point recorded his first career playoff goal, which came in game two of the series, ending in a 5–3 Lightning win over the Devils at Amalie Arena. After defeating the eighth-seeded Devils in five games in the first round, the Lightning would defeat the third-seeded Boston Bruins in five games in the second round before getting defeated in seven games by the second-seeded and eventual Stanley Cup champion Washington Capitals, one win short from reaching the Stanley Cup Final. Point ended his first playoff with seven goals and nine assists for 16 points in all 17 games.

Point recorded his first career natural hat-trick in a 4–3 win over the Pittsburgh Penguins on November 15, 2018. He recorded his three goals within 1 minute and 31 seconds, the sixth-fastest three goals scored in NHL history. Point ended the 2018–19 season with 41 goals and 51 assists for 92 points in 79 games, helping the Lightning capture their first Presidents' Trophy in franchise history before ultimately being swept in the first round of the 2019 playoffs by the eighth-seeded Columbus Blue Jackets and ending the playoff with one goal and no assists for one point in all four games.

On September 23, 2019, the Lightning re-signed Point to a three-year, $20.25 million extension. That same day, he revealed he had undergone hip surgery in the 2019 off-season to repair a torn labrum and that he is ready to start the 2019–20 season, in which he recorded 25 goals and 39 assists for 64 points in 66 games until the final three weeks of the season got canceled due to the COVID-19 pandemic. On August 11, 2020, in the first round of the 2020 playoffs, Point scored the winning goal in game one against the Columbus Blue Jackets in what was the fourth-longest game in NHL history. His goal came with 9:33 left in quintuple overtime. Eight days later, in game five, Point scored in the first overtime period to clinch the series for the Lightning. On September 7, Point recorded a five-point night to help the Lightning to a 8–2 win over the New York Islanders in the first game of the Eastern Conference final. The five-point game established a new franchise record for most points in a single playoff game. Point eventually won the Stanley Cup on September 28 after the Lightning defeated the Dallas Stars in six games during the 2020 Stanley Cup Final and led the league in goals (14) while also recording 19 assists for 33 points. He and Nikita Kucherov also became the first teammates to have 30 playoff points (Point (33), Kucherov (34) since Sidney Crosby (31) and Evgeni Malkin (37) in 2009.

Point finished the COVID-shortened 2020–21 season with a team-leading 23 goals and 25 assists for a team-leading 48 points in all 56 games before helping the Lightning repeat as Stanley Cup champions as they defeated the intrastate rival Florida Panthers in six games, Carolina Hurricanes in six games and New York Islanders in seven games in the first three rounds of the 2021 playoffs before defeating the Montreal Canadiens in five games in the 2021 Stanley Cup Final. He ended the playoffs with 14 goals and nine assists for 23 points in all 23 games.

On July 28, 2021, Point signed an eight-year, $76 million extension with the Lightning. On November 20, in a 5–3 loss to the New Jersey Devils, Point suffered a shoulder injury, causing him to miss the next 14 games. He ended the 2021–22 season with 28 goals and 30 assists for 58 points in 66 games. In game seven of the first round of the 2022 playoffs against the Toronto Maple Leafs, Point suffered a torn quad, resulting in him missing the entirety of the second and third rounds against the Presidents Trophy-winning Florida Panthers and New York Rangers, respectively. Point returned to the Lightning lineup for the first two games of the 2022 Stanley Cup Final of the Colorado Avalanche before missing the final four as the Lightning would go on to lose in six games to the top-seeded Avalanche. Point finished the playoffs with two goals and three assists for five points in nine games.

On February 23, 2023, Point scored his 200th NHL goal in a 6–5 OT loss to the Buffalo Sabres. He would end the 2022–23 season with 51 goals and 44 assists for 95 points in all 82 games played. His 51 goals led the team in goals while his 95 points ranked him second on the team in points. He also would record two goals and assists for four points in all six games where the Lightning played the Toronto Maple Leafs for the second consecutive year in the first round, this time losing in six games. Point was named a finalist for the Lady Byng Memorial Trophy for the first time in his career as the player "who best demonstrates sportsmanship and gentlemanly conduct combined with a high standard of playing ability", which would eventually be awarded to Los Angeles Kings forward and captain Anže Kopitar.

On October 10, 2023, in the first game of the 2023–24 season Point played in his 500th career game as the Lightning won 5–3 over the Nashville Predators. He would end the season playing in 81 games and leading the team in goals (46) and third in assists (44) for 90 points, ranking second on the team in points before recording two goals and three assists for five points in five games in the Lightning's first round defeat in five games to the eventual Stanley Cup champion Florida Panthers.

The 2024–25 season saw Point record a team-leading 42 goals along with 40 assists for 82 points in 77 games, while taking only seven penalty minutes, the fewest among players who finished in the top 50 in league scoring. He also recorded two goals and no assists for two points in the 2025 playoffs as the Lightning wwwre defeated by the Panthers in five games for a second consecutive year and third consecutive first round exit altogether. He was named a Lady Byng Trophy finalist for the second time, ultimately ceding the award to Kopitar once more.

On January 12, 2026, Point sustained a significant leg/knee injury in a 5–1 win over the Philadelphia Flyers as a result from getting tangled up with Flyers’ defenseman Cam York, resulting in him missing the next 11 games for the Lightning and the 2026 Winter Olympics. He ultimately finished the 2025–26 season with 18 goals and 32 assists for 50 points in 63 contests. He also was limited to just a goal and no assists for one point in all seven games in the 2026 playoffs as the Lightning suffered a fourth consecutive first round loss, this time to the Montreal Canadiens in seven games.

== International play ==
Medal record

Representing Canada

Ice hockey

World Championships
Silver medal – second place	2017 Germany/France	

4 Nations Face-Off
Winner	2025 Canada/United States	

IIHF World U20 Championship
Gold medal – first place	2015 Canada	

IIHF World U18 Championship
Bronze medal – third place	2014 Finland	

As a 16-year-old, Point was named an alternate captain for fifth place Canada Pacific in the 2013 World U-17 Hockey Challenge. As a 17-year-old, he was chosen to compete with the Canadian U-18 squad at the 2013 Ivan Hlinka Memorial Tournament where he won a gold medal and MVP honours, and he also helped Team Canada capture the bronze medal at the 2014 IIHF World U18 Championships. He was subsequently part of the Team Canada roster that captured a gold medal at the 2015 World Junior Ice Hockey Championship.

On April 12, 2017, Point was named to Canada's men's national ice hockey team for the 2017 IIHF World Championship. On May 21, 2017, Point earned a silver medal with Team Canada when they were defeated by Team Sweden 2–1.

Point was part of Team Canada's roster for the 4 Nations Face-Off in February 2025, the first international tournament with full NHL participation since 2016. Canada defeated the United States to win the championship. He was subsequently named to the Canadian team to compete at the 2026 Winter Olympics. However, Point withdrew from the team shortly before the tournament due to a knee injury, and was replaced by Seth Jarvis.

== Personal life ==
Point is the younger brother of Riley Point, who also played for the Canmore Eagles. The two brothers played together for four games while Point was a call up.

== Career statistics ==
=== Regular season and playoffs ===
Bold indicates led league

			Regular season					Playoffs
Season	Team	League	GP	G	A	Pts	PIM	GP	G	A	Pts	PIM
2011–12	Canmore Eagles	AJHL	4	2	2	4	0	—	—	—	—	—
2011–12	Moose Jaw Warriors	WHL	5	1	0	1	0	14	7	3	10	2
2012–13	Moose Jaw Warriors	WHL	67	24	33	57	26	—	—	—	—	—
2013–14	Moose Jaw Warriors	WHL	72	36	55	91	53	—	—	—	—	—
2014–15	Moose Jaw Warriors	WHL	60	38	49	87	46	—	—	—	—	—
2014–15	Syracuse Crunch	AHL	9	2	2	4	2	2	0	0	0	0
2015–16	Moose Jaw Warriors	WHL	48	35	53	88	36	10	6	10	16	10
2016–17	Tampa Bay Lightning	NHL	68	18	22	40	14	—	—	—	—	—
2017–18	Tampa Bay Lightning	NHL	82	32	34	66	24	17	7	9	16	10
2018–19	Tampa Bay Lightning	NHL	79	41	51	92	28	4	1	0	1	5
2019–20	Tampa Bay Lightning	NHL	66	25	39	64	11	22	**14**	19	33	10
2020–21	Tampa Bay Lightning	NHL	56	23	25	48	11	23	**14**	9	23	8
2021–22	Tampa Bay Lightning	NHL	66	28	30	58	33	9	2	3	5	4
2022–23	Tampa Bay Lightning	NHL	82	51	44	95	7	6	2	2	4	2
2023–24	Tampa Bay Lightning	NHL	81	46	44	90	14	5	2	3	5	2
2024–25	Tampa Bay Lightning	NHL	77	42	40	82	7	5	2	0	2	4
2025–26	Tampa Bay Lightning	NHL	63	18	32	50	14	7	1	0	1	2
NHL totals			720	324	361	685	163	99	45	45	90	47

=== International ===
Year	Team	Event	Result	GP	G	A	Pts	PIM
2013	Canada	IH18	1st place, gold medalist(s)	5	1	3	4	2
2013	Canada Pacific	U17	5th	5	2	3	5	14
2014	Canada	U18	3rd place, bronze medalist(s)	4	0	2	2	2
2015	Canada	WJC	1st place, gold medalist(s)	7	2	2	4	4
2016	Canada	WJC	6th	5	1	4	5	0
2017	Canada	WC	2nd place, silver medalist(s)	10	4	1	5	0
2025	Canada	4NF	1st place, gold medalist(s)	4	1	1	2	0
Junior totals				26	6	14	20	22
Senior totals				14	5	2	7	0

== Awards and honours ==
Award	Year
WHL
CHL/NHL Top Prospects Game (Team Orr)	2014
WHL East First All-Star Team	2015, 2016
NHL
NHL All-Star Game	2018
Stanley Cup champion	2020, 2021
International
Ivan Hlinka Memorial Tournament MVP	2013

=== Records ===
==== Tampa Bay Lightning ====
- Most playoff goals in a single season, (14) (2020, 2021).
