= 2021 Stanley Cup Final =

2021 ice hockey championship series

	1	2	3	4	5	Total
Montreal Canadiens	1	1	3	3*	0	1
Tampa Bay Lightning	5	3	6	2*	1	4
- * – Denotes overtime period(s)
- Location(s): Montreal: Bell Centre (3, 4); Tampa: Amalie Arena (1, 2, 5)
- Coaches: Montreal: Dominique Ducharme (interim); Tampa Bay: Jon Cooper
- Captains: Montreal: Shea Weber; Tampa Bay: Steven Stamkos
- Referees: Francis Charron (1, 3); Gord Dwyer (3, 5); Eric Furlatt (2, 4); Dan O'Rourke (1, 5); Kelly Sutherland (2, 4)
- Dates: June 28 – July 7, 2021
- MVP: Andrei Vasilevskiy (Lightning)
- Series-winning goal: Ross Colton (13:27, second)
- Hall of Famers: Canadiens: Carey Price (2026); Shea Weber (2024)
- Networks: Canada: (English): CBC/Sportsnet (French): TVA Sports; United States: (English): NBCSN (1–2), NBC (3–5)
- Announcers: (CBC/SN) Chris Cuthbert and Craig Simpson (TVA) Felix Seguin and Patrick Lalime (NBC/NBCSN) Kenny Albert, Eddie Olczyk (1, 3–5), Brian Boucher (1–2, 4–5), and Pierre McGuire (2–3) (NHL International) E.J. Hradek and Kevin Weekes

The 2021 Stanley Cup Final was the championship series of the National Hockey League's (NHL) 2020–21 season and the culmination of the 2021 Stanley Cup playoffs. The series was between the Montreal Canadiens and the defending Stanley Cup champion Tampa Bay Lightning. The Lightning won the best-of-seven series, four games to one, for their second consecutive and the third overall championship in franchise history. Tampa Bay had home-ice advantage in the series with the better regular season record.

Due to the COVID-19 pandemic that both shortened and delayed the start of the regular season, the series began on June 28, 2021, and concluded on July 7, 2021, marking the first time that games in the Stanley Cup Final were held in July. The cross-border travel restrictions under the pandemic also forced the league to temporarily realign this season into four divisions with no conferences, putting all seven Canadian teams into one of those divisions. Consequently, a divisional-based postseason format was held, featuring intra-divisional matchups in the first two rounds. The four divisional playoff champions were then re-seeded by regular season points in the Stanley Cup semifinals, with the winners of the semifinals advancing to the Stanley Cup Final; as such, these were the first playoffs since 1981 played outside the conference format. Under a normal playoff format, this Final series matchup would be impossible, as both the Lightning and Canadiens compete in the NHL's Eastern Conference. However, under the temporarily realigned divisions and total omission of the usual conferences, this scenario became possible.

This was the first Final since 2009 played entirely in the Eastern Time Zone, and first since 2011 to feature a Canadian-based team.

This Final matchup broke the Stanley Cup Final record for highest combined seed between teams, with 26 (Tampa Bay 8th, and Montreal 18th). This record was previously held by the 1991 Stanley Cup Final, which had a combined seed of 23.

== Paths to the Final ==
=== Impact of COVID-19 ===
The COVID-19 pandemic impacted the league for the second straight year with the Government of Canada and the Government of the United States both maintaining their cross-border travel restrictions. Consequently, the league temporarily realigned for this season into four regional divisions with no conferences, putting all seven Canadian teams into one of those divisions. Each team played 56 regular season games, all intra-divisional matchups. The league returned to the traditional 16-team playoff format, with the first two rounds of the playoffs also featuring intra-divisional matchups. This format delayed any possibility of cross-border travel until the third round. The league explored the possibility of having the Canadian team that advanced to the third round hold their home games in a neutral NHL city in the U.S. but were granted a cross-border travel exemption approved by the Public Health Agency of Canada.

Due to local COVID-19 health protocols during the regular season, all 24 American teams hosted limited numbers of in-person spectators while all seven Canadian teams played behind closed doors. During the first three rounds of the playoffs, a number of U.S. teams further increased their capacities, and three of the Canadian playoff teams admitted spectators for the first time. The Canadiens were the first (and only) team from Canada to offer tickets to the general public. By the time the Final started, Florida health officials had allowed the Lightning to admit 16,300 fans (85 percent of full capacity) at Amalie Arena for game one, then allowed up to 100% capacity for game two and beyond. The Canadiens were permitted to issue 3,500 tickets for the Bell Centre, up from 2,500 earlier in the playoffs, after Quebec health officials denied the team's request to increase it to 10,500 fans (50 percent of capacity) before game three.

=== Montreal Canadiens ===
This was Montreal's 35th Stanley Cup Final appearance. They have won the Stanley Cup a record twenty-four times (the second most championships in major North American sports behind the New York Yankees' twenty-seven World Series victories). They are the most recent Canadian team to win the Stanley Cup, doing so in 1993 (their most recent Final appearance) against the Los Angeles Kings, winning in five games. They were also the first Canadian team since the 2011 Vancouver Canucks to reach the Final.

Montreal's Stanley Cup Final patch

During the offseason, the Canadiens traded left wing Max Domi and a third-round pick for right wing Josh Anderson. They also picked up forwards Tyler Toffoli, Michael Frolik, and Corey Perry in free agency. The team also re-signed goaltender Jake Allen and forward Brendan Gallagher. During the season, Hobey Baker Award winner and rookie Cole Caufield made his debut with the Canadiens. The team traded for forward Eric Staal as well as defencemen Jon Merrill and Erik Gustafsson.

On February 24, 2021, head coach Claude Julien was fired after coaching the team through parts of five seasons during his second stint as head coach of the Canadiens, which had registered a 9–5–4 record to start the season. Assistant coach Dominique Ducharme was named interim head coach.

The team finished with a record of 24–21–11 to finish fourth in the North Division. In the playoffs, the Canadiens came back from a 3–1 deficit in their series with their rival Toronto Maple Leafs to win in seven games, swept the Winnipeg Jets in the second round, and knocked off the Vegas Golden Knights in the Stanley Cup semifinals in six games.

As they had in the past, the Canadiens used the French version of the Stanley Cup Final logo patch on their jerseys.

=== Tampa Bay Lightning ===
This was Tampa Bay's second consecutive and fourth overall Final appearance. They won the previous year against the Dallas Stars in six games.

Tampa Bay made very few transactions to gain players in the offseason. They traded away Braydon Coburn and Cedric Paquette and let Zach Bogosian, Kevin Shattenkirk, and Carter Verhaeghe walk via free agency. They re-signed Anthony Cirelli, Patrick Maroon, Luke Schenn, and Mikhail Sergachev. During the season, they traded for defenceman David Savard and traded away forward Alexander Volkov. Forward Nikita Kucherov, who had hip surgery prior to the regular season, returned for the playoffs.

Tampa Bay finished with a 36–17–3 record to finish third in the Central Division. In the playoffs, the Lightning defeated their intrastate rival, the Florida Panthers, in six games in the first round. The Lightning then triumphed over the Carolina Hurricanes in five games and in the Stanley Cup semifinals, a rematch of the previous year's Eastern Conference final, they defeated the New York Islanders in seven games.

== Game summaries ==
Note: The numbers in parentheses represent each player's total goals or assists to that point of the entire playoffs.

=== Game one ===
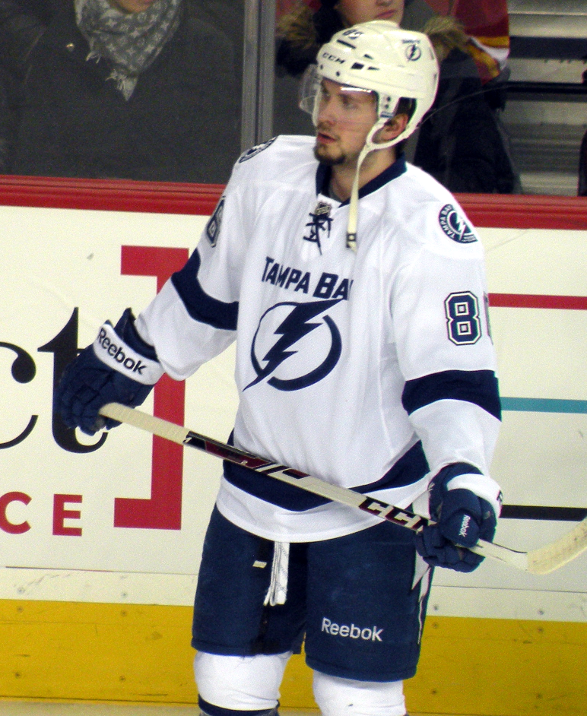
Nikita Kucherov scored two goals and three points in game one.

The Lightning took the lead early in the first period. With Tampa Bay defenseman Erik Cernak joining the rush with Ondrej Palat, Palat passed to an open Cernak who fired a wrist shot past Carey Price resulting in a 1–0 lead for Tampa Bay. In the second period, the Lightning grabbed a 2–0 lead when Blake Coleman's shot through traffic deflected off of Yanni Gourde and into the net. The Canadiens then halved the Lightning's lead as their offensive-zone coverage swept Tampa Bay's end setting up Ben Chiarot for a one-timer and Montreal's first goal of the game. The Lightning regained their two-goal lead in the third period when Nikita Kucherov's shot across the net got swatted by Chiarot and into his own net. After Brayden Point won a faceoff, the puck was picked up by Kucherov who fired a wrist shot past Price to gain a 4–1 lead. Towards the end of the third period and with frustrations boiling over for Montreal, Joel Edmundson took a roughing penalty with 2:40 left in the period. On the ensuing power-play, Kucherov passed to captain Steven Stamkos whose shot got past Price for a 5–1 lead, sealing the victory for the Lightning. The goal ended Montreal's penalty-killing streak at 32.

June 28	Montreal Canadiens	1–5	Tampa Bay Lightning	Amalie Arena	Recap

Scoring summary
Period	Team	Goal	Assist(s)	Time	Score
1st	TBL	Erik Cernak (1)	Ondrej Palat (7), Brayden Point (7)	06:19	1–0 TBL
2nd	TBL	Yanni Gourde (6)	Blake Coleman (7), Barclay Goodrow (2)	05:47	2–0 TBL
2nd	MTL	Ben Chiarot (3)	Jesperi Kotkaniemi (3), Shea Weber (4)	17:40	2–1 TBL
3rd	TBL	Nikita Kucherov (6)	Mikhail Sergachev (3)	02:00	3–1 TBL
3rd	TBL	Nikita Kucherov (7)	Brayden Point (8)	11:25	4–1 TBL
3rd	TBL	Steven Stamkos (8) – pp	Nikita Kucherov (23), Brayden Point (9)	18:50	5–1 TBL
Penalty summary
Period	Team	Player	Penalty	Time	PIM
1st	TBL	Barclay Goodrow	Cross checking	15:21	2:00
1st	MTL	Ben Chiarot	Roughing	19:14	2:00
2nd	None				
3rd	TBL	Erik Cernak	Roughing	06:30	2:00
3rd	MTL	Eric Staal	Roughing	06:30	2:00
3rd	TBL	Blake Coleman	Roughing	13:42	2:00
3rd	MTL	Jesperi Kotkaniemi	High-sticking	15:51	2:00
3rd	MTL	Joel Edmundson	Roughing	17:20	2:00

Shots by period
Team	1	2	3	Total
MTL	5	9	5	19
TBL	7	12	8	27

=== Game two ===
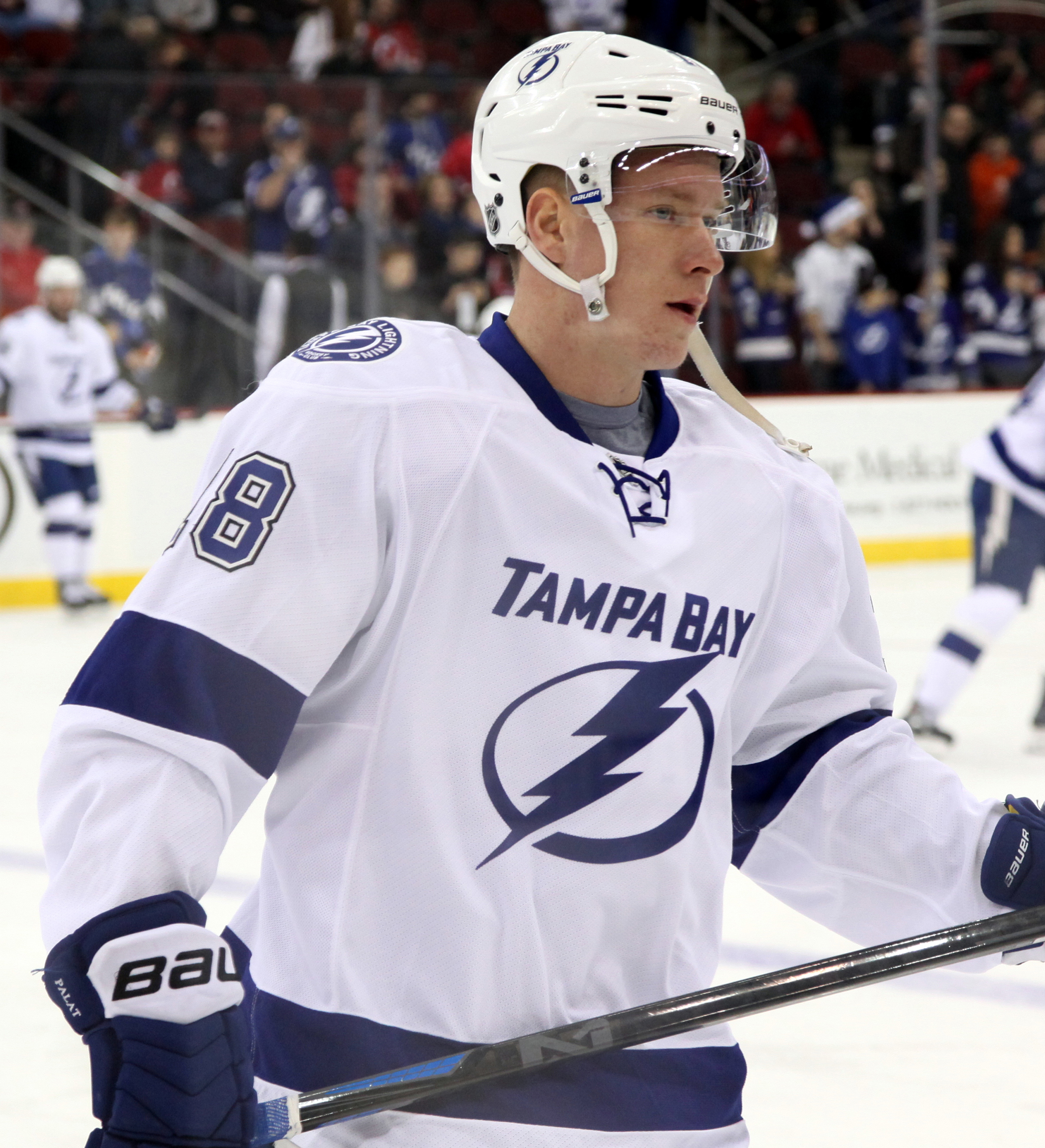
Ondrej Palat's goal helped to secure Tampa Bay's win in game two.

In game two, the Canadiens poured off more shots than in the first game. The first period saw Montreal make thirteen shots compared to Tampa Bay's six. However, neither team was able to score in the opening frame. In the second period, Montreal had more than double the shots of Tampa Bay, yet the Lightning ended up with two goals in contrast to the Canadiens' one. The first Lightning goal came from Anthony Cirelli, whose point shot pinballed in off of Carey Price's blocker and into the net. After Lightning defenceman Mikhail Sergachev committed an interference penalty on Artturi Lehkonen, Montreal tied the score on a power-play when Nick Suzuki floated a backhand shot through traffic and under Andrei Vasilevskiy's pads. With 1.1 seconds left in the second period, Tampa Bay forward Barclay Goodrow got past Ben Chiarot forcing a two-on-one with Blake Coleman. Goodrow passed it to Coleman who shot it past Price for the buzzer-beater. In the third period, Montreal continued to pressure the Lightning and Vasilevskiy, however, after a dump-in by Tampa Bay ended up in the Canadiens' zone, an errant pass off the boards by Joel Edmundson gave the puck away to Ondrej Palat, scoring the goal that made it 3–1. At the end of the game, both Corey Perry and Cirelli each received misconducts after an altercation.

June 30	Montreal Canadiens	1–3	Tampa Bay Lightning	Amalie Arena	Recap

Scoring summary
Period	Team	Goal	Assist(s)	Time	Score
1st	None				
2nd	TBL	Anthony Cirelli (5)	Tyler Johnson (2), Jan Rutta (1)	06:40	1–0 TBL
2nd	MTL	Nick Suzuki (6) – pp	Unassisted	10:36	1–1
2nd	TBL	Blake Coleman (2)	Barclay Goodrow (3), Ryan McDonagh (6)	19:58	2–1 TBL
3rd	TBL	Ondrej Palat (5)	Unassisted	15:42	3–1 TBL
Penalty summary
Period	Team	Player	Penalty	Time	PIM
1st	MTL	Jeff Petry	Tripping	05:29	2:00
1st	MTL	Paul Byron	Slashing	09:57	2:00
1st	MTL	Paul Byron	Slashing	17:27	2:00
1st	TBL	Erik Cernak	Cross checking	17:27	2:00
1st	TBL	Ryan McDonagh	High-sticking – double minor	17:32	4:00
2nd	TBL	Mikhail Sergachev	Interference	10:03	2:00
2nd	MTL	Joel Armia	High-sticking	16:38	2:00
3rd	TBL	Anthony Cirelli	Cross checking	20:00	2:00
3rd	TBL	Anthony Cirelli	Misconduct	20:00	10:00
3rd	MTL	Corey Perry	Roughing	20:00	2:00
3rd	MTL	Corey Perry	Misconduct	20:00	10:00

Shots by period
Team	1	2	3	Total
MTL	13	16	14	43
TBL	6	7	10	23

=== Game three ===
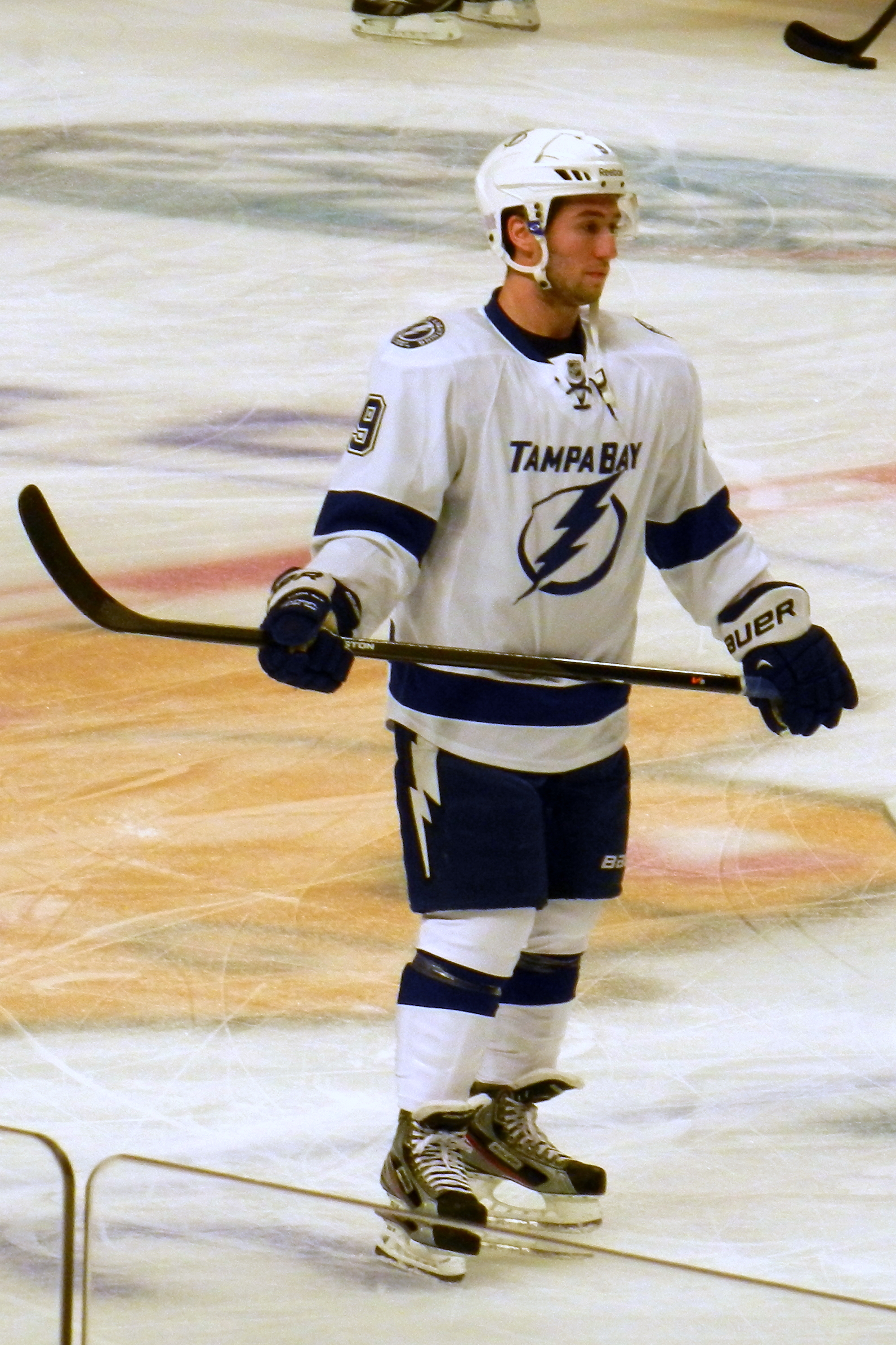
Tyler Johnson scored two goals, including the game-winning goal, in game three.

In the first four minutes of the first period, the Lightning grabbed a 2–0 lead. The first goal came from a point shot through traffic by Jan Rutta. After Eric Staal shot the puck over the glass causing a power-play for Tampa Bay, Victor Hedman scored the second goal when his point shot bounced off of Carey Price and into the net. The Canadiens were able to score a goal within their seventeen shots as a two-on-one with captain Shea Weber and Phillip Danault allowed the latter's wrist shot to rip off both posts and past Andrei Vasilevskiy. In the second period, the Lightning followed the same momentum from the first period with another two goals in the first four minutes. When an errant change by Montreal created an opening for Ondrej Palat and Nikita Kucherov, Kucherov fired the puck past Price. At 3:33, the Lightning began another two-on-one rush during which Mathieu Joseph's shot rebounded to Tyler Johnson who scored to give Tampa Bay a 4–1 lead. However, just like the first period, Montreal scored which brought their deficit to two. Nick Suzuki, who drove down the right side of Tampa Bay's defensive zone, shot the puck under Vasilevskiy's pads. In the third period, the Lightning mainly held a defensive strategy. In the final five minutes, the Lightning gained a three-goal lead again when defenceman Erik Gustafsson gave the puck away to Johnson and he scored his second goal of the game. The Canadiens quickly rebounded after pulling their goalie and Corey Perry scored top-shelf over Vasilevskiy. However, with the empty net, the Lightning took advantage as Blake Coleman backhanded the puck into the net and the game ended 6–3.

July 2	Tampa Bay Lightning	6–3	Montreal Canadiens	Bell Centre	Recap

Scoring summary
Period	Team	Goal	Assist(s)	Time	Score
1st	TBL	Jan Rutta (2)	Ondrej Palat (7), Victor Hedman (16)	01:52	1–0 TBL
1st	TBL	Victor Hedman (2) – pp	Nikita Kucherov (24), Anthony Cirelli (7)	03:27	2–0 TBL
1st	MTL	Phillip Danault (1)	Shea Weber (5)	11:16	2–1 TBL
2nd	TBL	Nikita Kucherov (8)	Ondrej Palat (8), Erik Cernak (9)	01:40	3–1 TBL
2nd	TBL	Tyler Johnson (3)	Mathieu Joseph (1), David Savard (4)	03:33	4–1 TBL
2nd	MTL	Nick Suzuki (3)	Jeff Petry (6), Cole Caufield (6)	18:04	4–2 TBL
3rd	TBL	Tyler Johnson (7)	Unassisted	15:19	5–2 TBL
3rd	MTL	Corey Perry (4)	Brendan Gallagher (4), Ben Chiarot (1)	15:58	5–3 TBL
3rd	TBL	Blake Coleman (7) – en	Barclay Goodrow (4)	16:48	6–3 TBL
Penalty summary
Period	Team	Player	Penalty	Time	PIM
1st	MTL	Eric Staal	Delay of game (puck over glass)	02:54	2:00
1st	TBL	Mikhail Sergachev	Interference	17:29	2:00
2nd	None				
3rd	None				

Shots by period
Team	1	2	3	Total
TBL	12	9	9	30
MTL	17	8	10	35

=== Game four ===
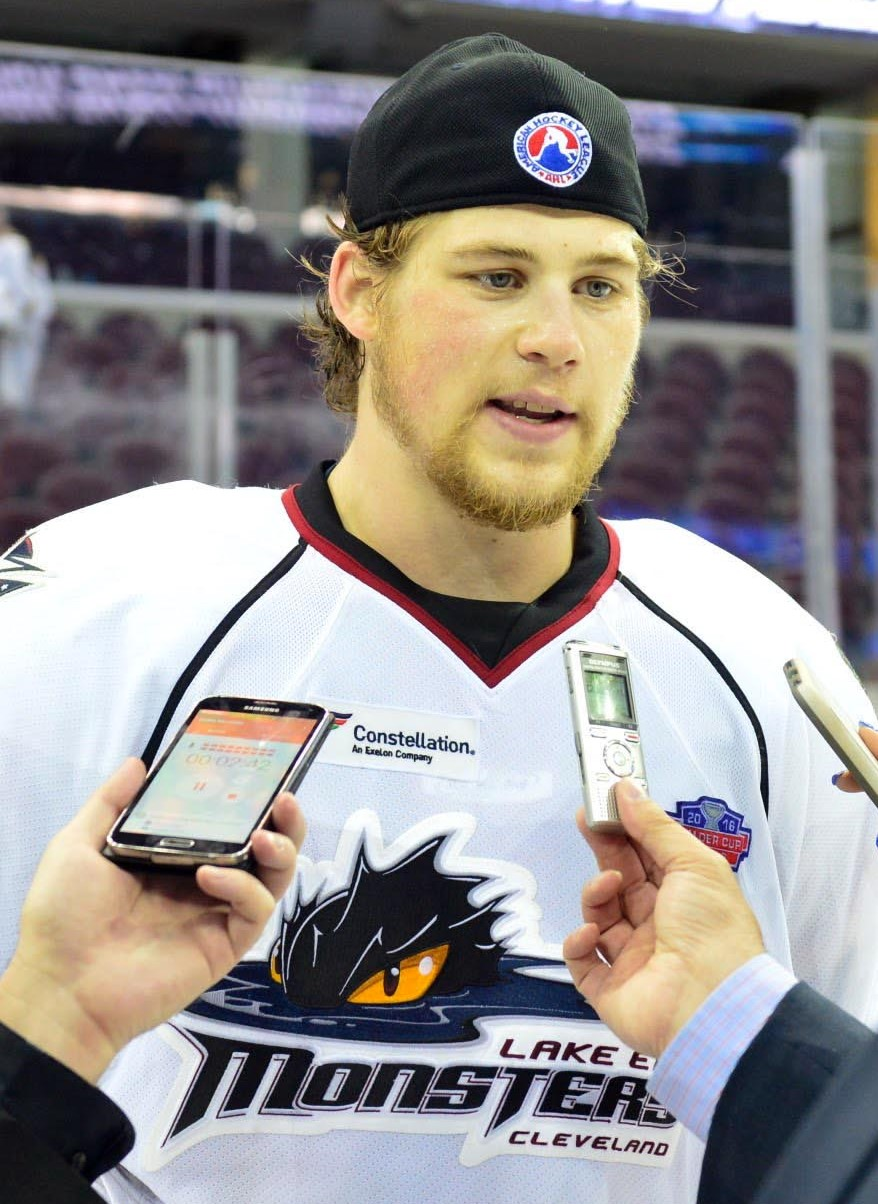
Josh Anderson, shown with Lake Erie, scored twice in game four, including the overtime-winning goal.

In the first period, the Canadiens scored first, taking their first lead in the series, as Nick Suzuki made a pretty passing play to Josh Anderson who fired it past Andrei Vasilevskiy. The Lightning were able to continue pressuring the Canadiens into the second period. This pressure led to a backhand pass by Ryan McDonagh to Barclay Goodrow as he fired the puck into an open net. In the third period, Alexander Romanov fired a wrist shot from the blue line, scoring to make it 2–1 for Montreal. The Lightning tied it five minutes later when Mathieu Joseph sprung a two-on-one with Patrick Maroon and the latter scored, ending his goal-scoring drought. With the game tied 2–2 after the third period, both teams headed to overtime. In overtime, the Canadiens killed a double-minor penalty caused by Shea Weber and less than a minute later, Anderson put the puck past Vasilevskiy, preventing the first four-game sweep in the Final since 1998, and winning the game 3–2.

July 5	Tampa Bay Lightning	2–3	OT	Montreal Canadiens	Bell Centre	Recap

Scoring summary
Period	Team	Goal	Assist(s)	Time	Score
1st	MTL	Josh Anderson (4)	Nick Suzuki (9), Cole Caufield (7)	15:39	1–0 MTL
2nd	TBL	Barclay Goodrow (2)	Ryan McDonagh (7), Blake Coleman (8)	17:20	1–1
3rd	MTL	Alexander Romanov (1)	Jake Evans (1)	08:48	2–1 MTL
3rd	TBL	Patrick Maroon (2)	Mathieu Joseph (2), Tyler Johnson (3)	13:48	2–2
OT	MTL	Josh Anderson (5)	Cole Caufield (8)	03:57	3–2 MTL
Penalty summary
Period	Team	Player	Penalty	Time	PIM
1st	MTL	Jake Evans	Interference	16:33	2:00
1st	TBL	Brayden Point	Roughing	16:33	2:00
1st	MTL	Joel Edmundson	Slashing	17:59	2:00
1st	TBL	Patrick Maroon	Unsportsmanlike conduct	20:00	2:00
1st	MTL	Joel Edmundson	Unsportsmanlike conduct	20:00	2:00
2nd	TBL	Brayden Point	High-sticking	05:50	2:00
2nd	MTL	Corey Perry	Hooking	09:43	2:00
2nd	MTL	Joel Armia	Tripping	14:28	2:00
3rd	MTL	Jeff Petry	Roughing	07:42	2:00
3rd	MTL	Ben Chiarot	Roughing	07:42	2:00
3rd	MTL	Josh Anderson	Roughing	07:42	2:00
3rd	TBL	Barclay Goodrow	Roughing	07:42	2:00
3rd	TBL	Blake Coleman	Roughing	07:42	2:00
3rd	TBL	Yanni Gourde	Roughing	07:42	2:00
3rd	MTL	Shea Weber	High-sticking – double minor	18:59	4:00
OT	None				

Shots by period
Team	1	2	3	OT	Total
TBL	12	8	10	4	34
MTL	5	9	5	2	21

=== Game five ===
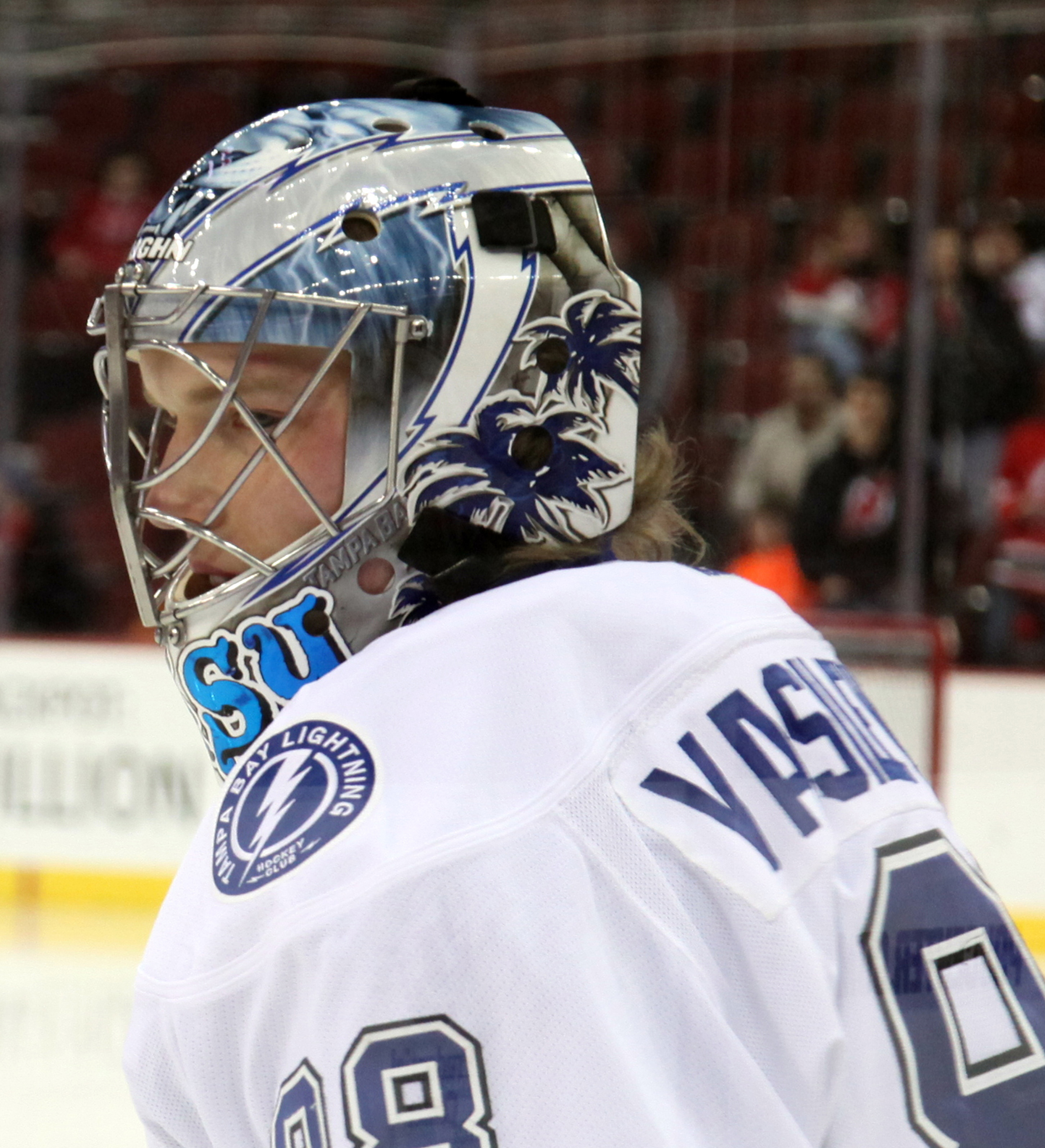
Andrei Vasilevskiy recorded his fifth-straight shutout in a series-clinching game in game five.

Tampa Bay dominated during the first period of game five, recording thirteen shots on target to the Canadiens' four, but neither team scored. The second period had the opposite trend, with the Canadiens getting ten shots compared to the Lightning's six shots. Nevertheless, it was Tampa Bay who scored the opening goal, when Ryan McDonagh set up a David Savard shot that was tipped in by Ross Colton. It would prove to be the only goal of the contest. Tampa Bay held onto their one-goal lead throughout the third period, with Andrei Vasilevskiy recording a shutout. The 1–0 victory won the series for Tampa Bay and their second consecutive Stanley Cup.

Vasilevskiy was awarded the Conn Smythe Trophy as most valuable player during the playoffs, becoming the first goaltender since Jonathan Quick in 2012 to win the award. With their victory, the Lightning became the first team since the 1983 New York Islanders to win the Stanley Cup without winning an overtime game during the playoffs. Patrick Maroon won the Stanley Cup in three consecutive seasons, a feat which hadn't occurred since multiple members of the 1983 New York Islanders accomplished it. Maroon was the first player since Ed Litzenberger in 1963 to win the Stanley Cup in three consecutive years with two different teams.

July 7	Montreal Canadiens	0–1	Tampa Bay Lightning	Amalie Arena	Recap

Scoring summary
Period	Team	Goal	Assist(s)	Time	Score
1st	None				
2nd	TBL	Ross Colton (4)	David Savard (5), Ryan McDonagh (8)	13:27	1–0 TBL
3rd	None				
Penalty summary
Period	Team	Player	Penalty	Time	PIM
1st	MTL	Corey Perry	Hooking	03:21	2:00
1st	TBL	Jan Rutta	Cross-checking	07:19	2:00
1st	MTL	Corey Perry	Embellishment	08:15	2:00
1st	TBL	Erik Cernak	Interference	08:15	2:00
1st	MTL	Josh Anderson	Hooking	08:43	2:00
2nd	TBL	David Savard	Delay of game (puck over glass)	00:21	2:00
2nd	TBL	Mikhail Sergachev	Tripping	08:32	2:00
2nd	MTL	Ben Chiarot	Holding	19:22	2:00
3rd	None				

Shots by period
Team	1	2	3	Total
MTL	4	10	8	22
TBL	13	6	11	30

== Team rosters ==
Years indicated in boldface under the "Final appearance" column signify that the player won the Stanley Cup in the given year.

=== Montreal Canadiens ===
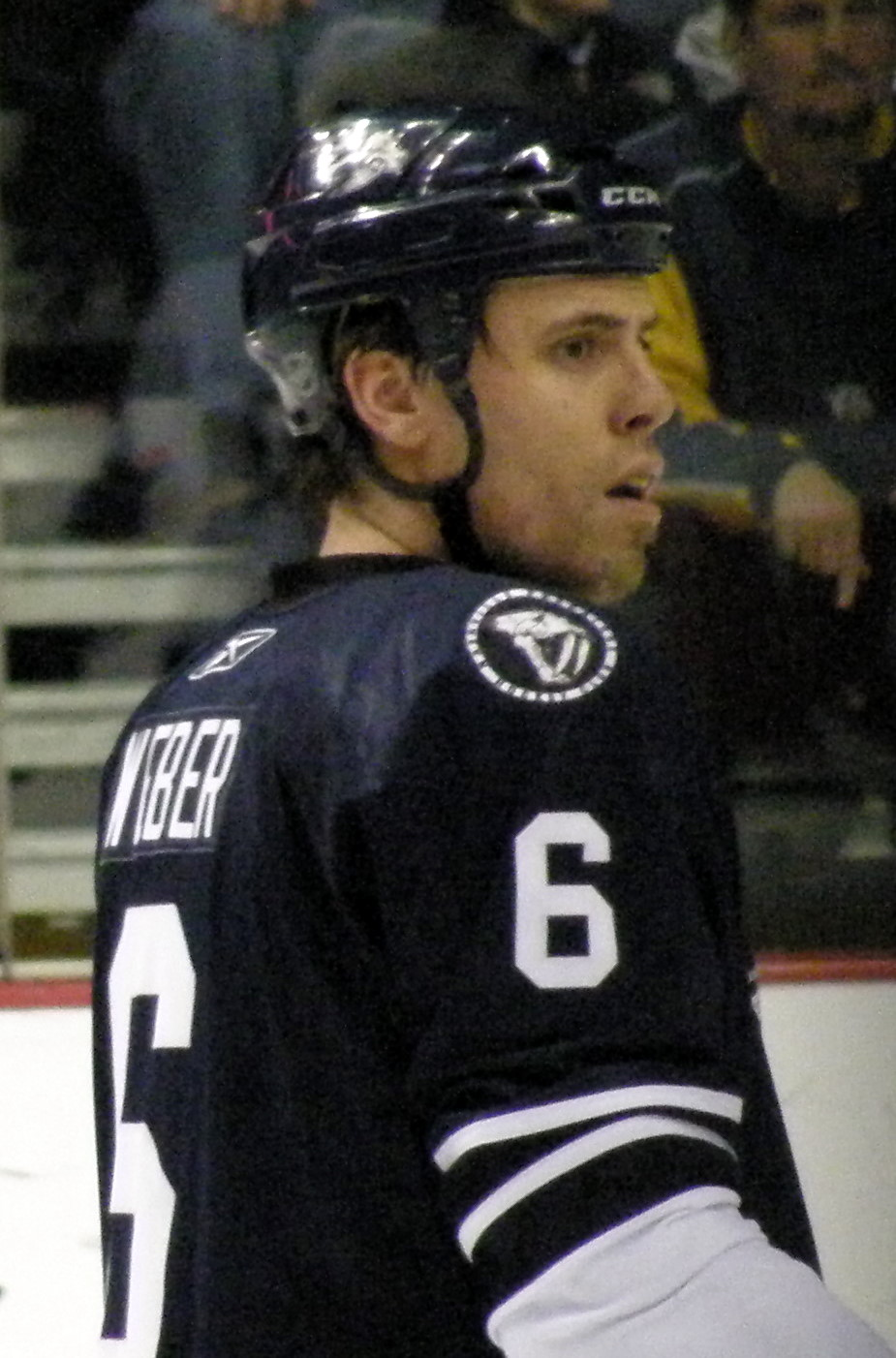
Shea Weber (pictured with Nashville) captained the Canadiens to their thirty-fifth Final appearance in franchise history and first since 1993.

#	Nat	Player	Position	Hand	Age	Acquired	Place of birth	Final appearance
34	(Canada)	Jake Allen	G	L	30	2020	Fredericton, New Brunswick	second (**2019**)
17	(Canada)	Josh Anderson	RW	R	27	2020	Burlington, Ontario	first
40	(Finland)	Joel Armia	RW	R	29	2018	Pori, Finland	first
60	(Canada)	Alex Belzile	RW	R	29	2019	Saint-Éloi, Quebec	first
41	(Canada)	Paul Byron – **A**	LW	L	32	2015	Ottawa, Ontario	first
22	(United States)	Cole Caufield	RW	R	20	2019	Mosinee, Wisconsin	first
8	(Canada)	Ben Chiarot	D	L	31	2019	Hamilton, Ontario	first
24	(Canada)	Phillip Danault	C	L	28	2016	Victoriaville, Quebec	first
92	(Canada)	Jonathan Drouin	LW	L	26	2017	Sainte-Agathe-des-Monts, Quebec	second (2015)
44	(Canada)	Joel Edmundson	D	L	27	2020	Brandon, Manitoba	second (**2019**)
71	(Canada)	Jake Evans	C	R	25	2014	Toronto, Ontario	first
20	(Canada)	Cale Fleury	D	R	22	2017	Carlyle, Saskatchewan	first
67	(Czech Republic)	Michael Frolik	RW	L	33	2020	Kladno, Czechoslovakia	second (**2013**)
11	(Canada)	Brendan Gallagher – **A**	RW	R	29	2010	Edmonton, Alberta	first
32	(Sweden)	Erik Gustafsson	D	L	29	2021	Nynäshamn, Sweden	first
15	(Finland)	Jesperi Kotkaniemi	C	L	20	2018	Pori, Finland	first
77	(Canada)	Brett Kulak	D	L	27	2018	Edmonton, Alberta	first
62	(Finland)	Artturi Lehkonen	LW	L	25	2015	Piikkiö, Finland	first
39	(United States)	Charlie Lindgren	G	R	27	2016	Lakeville, Minnesota	first
70	(Canada)	Michael McNiven	G	L	23	2015	Winnipeg, Manitoba	first
28	(United States)	Jon Merrill	D	L	29	2021	Oklahoma City, Oklahoma	second (2018)
61	(Canada)	Xavier Ouellet	D	L	27	2018	Bayonne, France	first
94	(Canada)	Corey Perry	RW	R	36	2020	New Liskeard, Ontario	third (**2007**, 2020)
26	(United States)	Jeff Petry	D	R	33	2015	Ann Arbor, Michigan	first
31	(Canada)	Carey Price	G	L	33	2005	Vancouver, British Columbia	first
30	(United States)	Cayden Primeau	G	L	21	2017	Farmington Hills, Michigan	first
27	(Russia)	Alexander Romanov	D	L	21	2018	Moscow, Russia	first
21	(Canada)	Eric Staal	C	L	36	2021	Thunder Bay, Ontario	second (**2006**)
14	(Canada)	Nick Suzuki	C	R	21	2018	London, Ontario	first
90	(Slovakia)	Tomas Tatar	LW	L	30	2018	Ilava, Czechoslovakia	second (2018)
73	(Canada)	Tyler Toffoli	RW	R	29	2020	Scarborough, Ontario	second (**2014**)
6	(Canada)	Shea Weber – **C**	D	R	35	2016	Sicamous, British Columbia	first

=== Tampa Bay Lightning ===
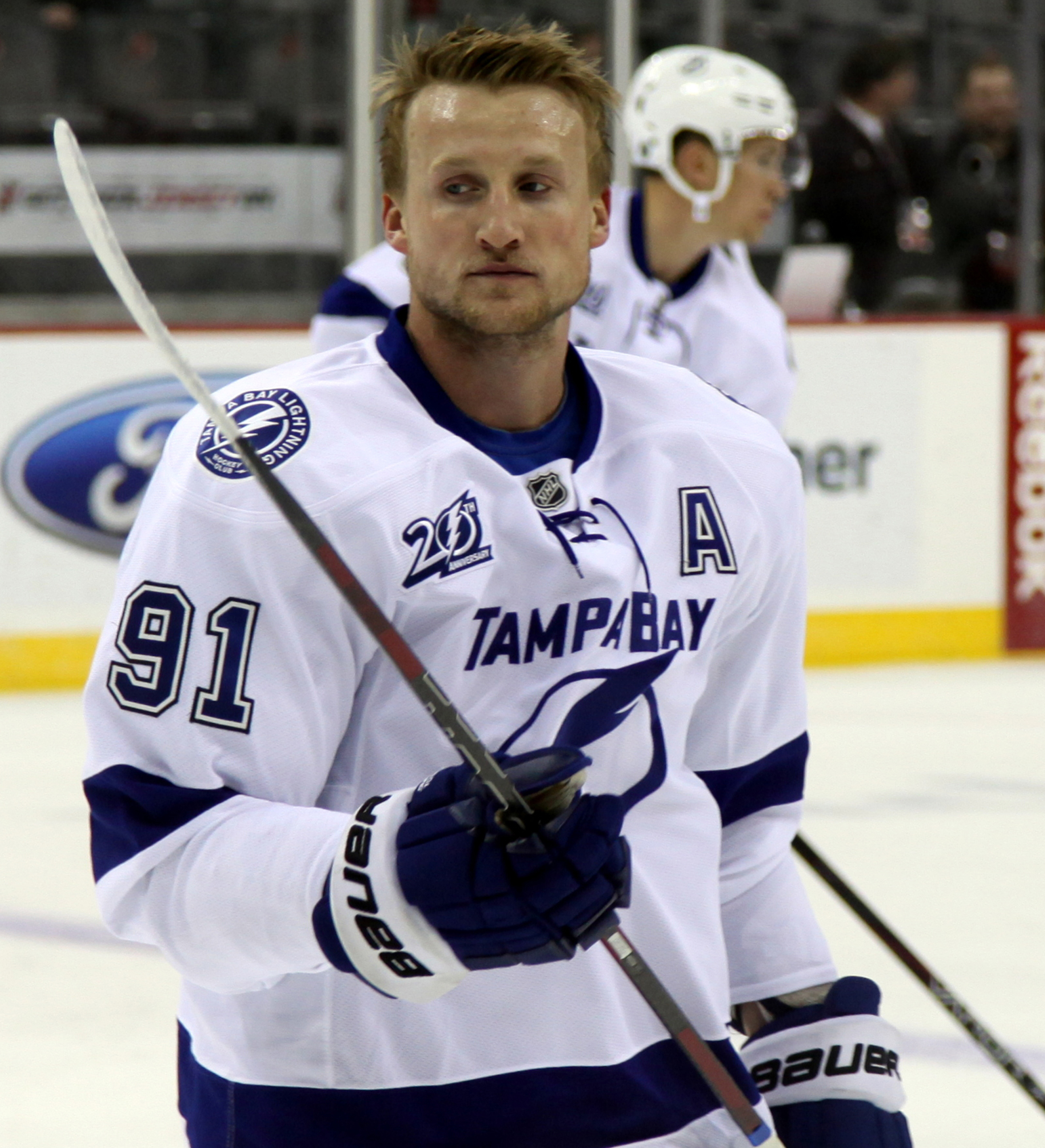
Steven Stamkos captained the Lightning to their second-straight Final appearance and fourth overall in franchise history.

#	Nat	Player	Position	Hand	Age	Acquired	Place of birth	Final appearance
60	(Canada)	Alex Barre-Boulet	C	L	24	2018	Montmagny, Quebec	first
5	(Sweden)	Andreas Borgman	D	L	26	2020	Stockholm, Sweden	first
81	(Slovakia)	Erik Cernak	D	L	24	2017	Košice, Slovakia	second (**2020**)
71	(Canada)	Anthony Cirelli	C	L	23	2015	Woodbridge, Ontario	second (**2020**)
3	(Sweden)	Fredrik Claesson	D	L	28	2021	Stockholm, Sweden	first
20	(United States)	Blake Coleman	C	L	29	2020	Plano, Texas	second (**2020**)
79	(United States)	Ross Colton	C	L	24	2016	Robbinsville, New Jersey	first
52	(Canada)	Callan Foote	D	R	22	2017	Englewood, Colorado	first
33	(Finland)	Christopher Gibson	G	L	28	2020	Karkkila, Finland	first
19	(Canada)	Barclay Goodrow	C/RW	L	28	2020	Toronto, Ontario	third (2016, **2020**)
37	(Canada)	Yanni Gourde	C	L	29	2014	Saint-Narcisse, Quebec	second (**2020**)
77	(Sweden)	Victor Hedman – **A**	D	L	30	2009	Örnsköldsvik, Sweden	third (2015, **2020**)
9	(United States)	Tyler Johnson	C	R	30	2011	Spokane, Washington	third (2015, **2020**)
7	(Canada)	Mathieu Joseph	RW	L	24	2015	Chambly, Quebec	second (**2020**)
41	(Canada)	Boris Katchouk	LW	L	23	2016	Waterloo, Ontario	first
17	(Canada)	Alex Killorn – **A**	C/LW	L	31	2007	Halifax, Nova Scotia	third (2015, **2020**)
86	(Russia)	Nikita Kucherov	RW	L	28	2011	Maykop, Russia	third (2015, **2020**)
14	(United States)	Patrick Maroon	LW	L	32	2019	St. Louis, Missouri	third (**2019**, **2020**)
30	(Canada)	Spencer Martin	G	R	26	2019	Oakville, Ontario	first
27	(United States)	Ryan McDonagh – **A**	D	L	32	2018	Saint Paul, Minnesota	third (2014, **2020**)
35	(Canada)	Curtis McElhinney	G	L	38	2019	London, Ontario	second (**2020**)
18	(Czech Republic)	Ondrej Palat	LW	L	30	2011	Frýdek-Místek, Czechoslovakia	third (2015, **2020**)
21	(Canada)	Brayden Point	C	R	25	2014	Calgary, Alberta	second (**2020**)
16	(Canada)	Taylor Raddysh	RW	R	23	2016	Caledon, Ontario	first
44	(Czech Republic)	Jan Rutta	D	R	30	2019	Písek, Czechoslovakia	second (**2020**)
58	(Canada)	David Savard	D	R	30	2021	Saint-Hyacinthe, Quebec	first
2	(Canada)	Luke Schenn	D	R	31	2019	Saskatoon, Saskatchewan	second (**2020**)
98	(Russia)	Mikhail Sergachev	D	L	22	2017	Nizhmekamsk, Russia	second (**2020**)
46	(Canada)	Gemel Smith	C	L	27	2019	Toronto, Ontario	first
91	(Canada)	Steven Stamkos – **C**	C	R	31	2008	Markham, Ontario	third (2015, **2020**)
67	(Canada)	Mitchell Stephens	C	R	24	2015	Peterborough, Ontario	second (**2020**)
56	(Canada)	Ben Thomas	D	R	25	2014	Calgary, Alberta	first
88	(Russia)	Andrei Vasilevskiy	G	L	26	2012	Tyumen, Russia	third (2015, **2020**)
85	(Canada)	Daniel Walcott	LW	L	27	2015	L'Île-Perrot, Quebec	first

== Stanley Cup engraving ==
The Stanley Cup was presented to Lightning captain Steven Stamkos by NHL commissioner Gary Bettman following the Lightning's 1–0 win in Game 5.

The following Lightning players and staff qualified to have their names engraved on the Stanley Cup:

2020–21 Tampa Bay Lightning

=== Players ===
Centres

- 9 Tyler Johnson
- 17 Alex Killorn* (A)
- 19 Barclay Goodrow*
- 20 Blake Coleman*
- 21 Brayden Point
- 37 Yanni Gourde
- 71 Anthony Cirelli*
- 79 Ross Colton
- 91 Steven Stamkos* (Captain)

Wingers

- 7 Mathieu Joseph
- 14 Pat Maroon
- 18 Ondrej Palat
- 86 Nikita Kucherov

Defencemen

- 2 Luke Schenn
- 27 Ryan McDonagh (A)
- 44 Jan Rutta
- 52 Cal Foote †
- 58 David Savard
- 77 Victor Hedman (A)
- 81 Erik Cernak
- 98 Mikhail Sergachev

Goaltenders

- 35 Curtis McElhinney
- 88 Andrei Vasilevskiy
- * Played both wing and centre and wing.
- † Automatically qualified for engraving despite shortened season, (Note: Automatic qualification for a player's name to be engraved on the Stanley Cup: Playing in (for a goaltender, dressing for) at least one Stanley Cup Final game or at least half of regular season games for the Stanley Cup winning team.) but did not play or dress in the Final.

=== Coaching and administrative staff ===
- Jeffrey Vinik (Chairman/Owner/Governor), Penny Vinik (Co-Owner),Steve Griggs (Chief Executive Officer/Alt. Governor), Julien BriseBois (Vice President/General Manager/Alt. Governor),
- Allen Murray (Asst General Manager-Director of Amateur Scouting), Jamie Pushor (Asst. General Manager-Director of Player Personnel), Stacy Roest (Asst. General Manager-Director of Player Development), Mathieu Darche (Director of Hockey Operations),
- Jon Cooper (Head Coach), Jeff Halpern (Asst. Coach), Derek Lalonde (Asst. Coach), Rob Zettler (Asst. Coach),
- Frantz Jean (Goaltending Coach), Brian Garlock (Video Coordinator), Nigel Kirwan (Video Coach)‡, Ryan Hamilton (Mental Performance Coach)
- Jean-Philippe "J.P." Cote (Director of Player Development), Mark Lambert (Director of High Performance/Strength Coach), Tom Mulligan (Athletic Trainer)‡
- Michael Poirier (Asst. Athletic Trainer), Ray Thill (Equipment Manager)‡, Rob Kennedy (Asst. Equipment Manager), Jason Berger (Asst. Equipment Manager),
- Christian Rivas (Massage Therapist), Brandon Rodgers (Physical Therapist, Asst. Strength & Conditioning Coach), Ryan Belec (Sr. Director of Team Services)‡
- Liz Sylvia Kokoharsky (Director of Hockey Administration), Michael Peterson (Director of Hockey Analytics), Ben Morgan (Video Analysis/player Analytics)
- ‡ Name engraved on the Stanley Cup with Tampa Bay in 2004, 2020, and 2021.

=== Engraving notes ===
- #52 Cal Foote (D) played in 35 regular season games, but did not play in the playoffs (he was a healthy scratch). Due to the shortened season, he played in at least half of the regular season games and automatically qualified to have his name engraved, despite playing in fewer games than what would usually be required.
- Penny Vinik (Co-Owner), Ryan Hamilton (Mental Performance Coach), Jean-Philippe "J.P." Cote (Director of Player Development), and Ben Morgan (Video Analysis/player Analytics) were left off the Stanley Cup engraving for the 2020 title, but included on the 2021 title engraving.
- Nigel Kirwan (Video Coach), Tom Mulligan (Athletic Trainer), Ray Thill (Equipment Manager), and Ryan Belec (Sr. Director of Team Services) had their names engraved on the Stanley Cup with Tampa Bay in 2004, 2020, and 2021.
- Pat Maroon won his third consecutive Stanley Cup, after winning in 2019 with St. Louis and 2020 with Tampa Bay. He is the first player to do so since multiple members of the New York Islanders accomplished the feat in 1982 and 1983. He was also the first player since 1963 to win three cups in a row with two different teams, previously accomplished by Ed Litzenberger with Chicago in 1961 and Toronto in 1962 and 1963.
- Assistant General Manager Al Murray was engraved as A.L. Murray, after having been engraved as Allen Murray the previous year.

=== Player notes ===
- Eleven players were on the roster during the playoffs, but left off the Stanley Cup engraving due to not qualifying. None appeared in the playoffs. Tampa Bay did not request an exemption to engrave their names. They received championship rings.
  - #60 Alex Barre-Boulet (C) – 15 regular season games
  - #67 Mitchell Stephens (C) – 7 regular season games, but missed 35 games and the entirety of the playoffs due to injury (name engraved on the Stanley Cup with Tampa Bay in 2020)
  - #5 Andreas Borgman (D) – 7 regular season games
  - #46 Gemel Smith (C) – 5 regular season games
  - #56 Ben Thomas (D) – 5 regular season games
  - #3 Fredrik Claesson (D) – 2 regular season games with Tampa Bay, 4 with San Jose
  - #33 Christopher Gibson (G) – 2 regular season games
  - #85 Daniel Walcott (LW) – 1 regular season game
  - #41 Boris Katchouk (LW) – 0 regular season games, 29 games with Syracuse of the American Hockey League (AHL)
  - #16 Taylor Raddysh (RW) – 0 regular season games, 27 games with Syracuse of the AHL
  - #30 Spencer Martin (G) – 0 regular season games, 15 games with Syracuse of the AHL

== Media rights ==
With the series running through the first week of July, no games were held on either Canada Day (July 1) or American Independence Day (July 4) to avoid scheduling conflicts.

In Canada, this was the seventh consecutive Stanley Cup Final broadcast by Sportsnet and CBC Television in English, and TVA Sports in French. The series was also streamed on Sportsnet Now and Rogers NHL Live.

In the United States, this was the sixteenth consecutive and final Stanley Cup Final produced by NBC Sports under their ten-year contract for American television rights to the NHL. NBCSN aired the first two games, while NBC televised the rest of the series. When the series started, only the first two games were available on Peacock, NBC's streaming service. However, on July 2, the day of game three, NBCUniversal announced that the remainder of the series would also be available on Peacock. Under the new seven-year contracts that began the next season, coverage of the Stanley Cup Final will be rotated annually between ABC (which broadcast its first Stanley Cup Final since 2004) in even years, and TNT (which will broadcast the Stanley Cup Final for the first time ever in 2023; the first time the series will be aired entirely on cable television) in odd years.

In Canada, Chris Cuthbert filled-in for Jim Hughson as Sportsnet lead play-by-play announcer after Hughson decided to not travel this season, and opted to only call national Vancouver Canucks home games due to COVID-19 pandemic. Hughson would later announce his retirement in September 2021.

In the U.S., Kenny Albert replaced the retired Mike "Doc" Emrick as NBC lead play-by-play announcer, having previously filled in for Emrick in game one of the 2014 Stanley Cup Final due to a death in the latter's family. NBC lead color commentator Eddie Olczyk missed game two due to a personal matter, so "Inside-the-Glass" reporter Brian Boucher moved to the booth with Albert, and Pierre McGuire took over for Boucher between the benches. McGuire also called Game 3 of this series since Boucher missed that game for the same reason. After the Final, Albert and Olczyk moved on to become TNT’s lead broadcast team (erstwhile NBC studio analyst Keith Jones was later added to join the pair), while Boucher joined ESPN/ABC. McGuire meanwhile, was hired by the Ottawa Senators as the team's senior vice-president of player development on July 12, having gone nearly three full decades without a managerial job in the NHL.

The series averaged 3.6 million people on Sportsnet and CBC, making it the most watched Final in Canada since the last time a Canadian team advanced this far in 2011. Meanwhile, the series averaged 2.52 million U.S. viewers, an increase from the 2.15 million average during the previous season's COVID-19-delayed Final series.

== Notes ==
Preceded by Tampa Bay Lightning; 2020	Tampa Bay Lightning; Stanley Cup champions 2021	Succeeded by Colorado Avalanche; 2022
