= Ross Colton =

American ice hockey player (born 1996)

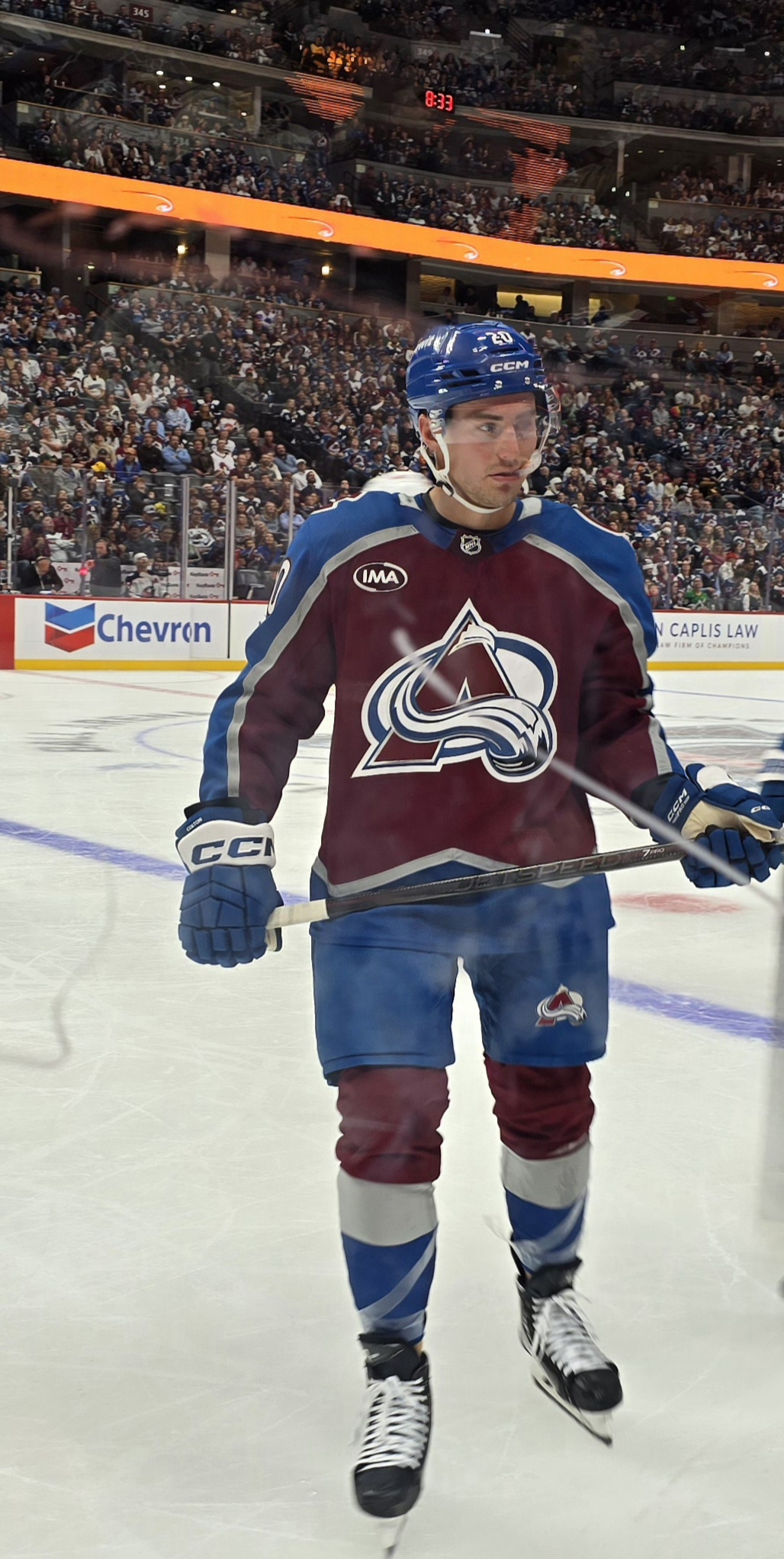
- Colton with the Colorado Avalanche in October 2024
- Born: September 11, 1996 (age 30) Robbinsville, New Jersey, U.S.
- Height: 6 ft 0 in (183 cm)
- Weight: 202 lb (92 kg; 14 st 6 lb)
- Position: Center
- Shoots: Left
- NHL team Former teams: Nashville Predators; Tampa Bay Lightning; Colorado Avalanche
- NHL draft: 118th overall, 2016; Tampa Bay Lightning
- Playing career: 2018–present

Ross Colton (born September 11, 1996) is an American professional ice hockey player who is a center for the Nashville Predators of the National Hockey League (NHL).

Growing up in New Jersey, Colton played at Princeton Day School for two seasons before transferring to Taft School, a boarding school in Connecticut, for his junior year. Following his junior year at Taft, Colton was drafted by the Cedar Rapids RoughRiders of the United States Hockey League. He spent another two years with the team, setting a league record for most goals and points at a USHL/NHL Top Prospects Game. As a result, Colton was selected by the Tampa Bay Lightning in the fourth round, 118th overall, of the 2016 NHL entry draft.

Following the NHL draft, Colton played two seasons with the Vermont Catamounts men's ice hockey team before signing a two-year entry-level contract with the Lightning. In his third season with the organization, Colton won the Stanley Cup by scoring the Stanley Cup-clinching goal in Game 5. He was traded to the Colorado Avalanche in the 2023 offseason, where he played three seasons, before a subsequent offseason trade to Nashville in 2026.

== Early life ==
Colton was born on September 11, 1996, in Robbinsville Township, New Jersey, United States. Colton was born into an athletic family; his father Rob was a baseball and soccer player at Steinert High School while his mother played basketball at McCorristin. Growing up, Colton was a fan of the New Jersey Devils and considered Zach Parise as his favorite player. Colton attended Sharon Elementary School in Robbinsville and Pond Road Middle School.

== Playing career ==
Growing up in New Jersey, Colton began his ice hockey career with the Mercer Chiefs under head coach Chris Barcless. During the 2012–13 season, Colton played with the New Jersey Rockets of the Atlantic Youth Hockey League where he recorded 22 goals and 41 points in 23 games. After being cut from a couple of local hockey Festival teams, Colton started training with Kevin Wagner and Barcless before joining Princeton Day School alongside his older brother Robert. During his time at Princeton, Colton played both hockey and baseball before transferring to Taft School, a boarding school in Connecticut, for his junior year.

Following his junior year at Taft, Colton was drafted in the 11th round, 179th overall, by the Cedar Rapids RoughRiders of the United States Hockey League (USHL). During his time with the team, he attended and graduated from Washington High School in Iowa. During his second season with the RoughRiders, Colton set a league record for most goals and points at a USHL/NHL Top Prospects Game and was subsequently named Team East's Most Valuable Player. He was also selected for Team USA's World Junior A Challenge Select Team where he scored five points to earn a bronze medal. Prior to the 2016 NHL entry draft, Colton ranked second in the league in points and goals with 35 goals and 66 points. As a result, he was drafted in the fourth round, 118th overall, by the Tampa Bay Lightning.

=== Collegiate ===
Colton played for the Vermont Catamounts men's ice hockey (UVM) team for two seasons before turning professional. During his freshman season, Colton skated in 33 games and recorded a team-high 12 goals and 15 assists. Despite missing four of the final five games of the season due to an injury, he tied for the team-lead in goals and second in points. As a result of his offensive output, Colton was named to the Pro Ambitions Hockey East All-Rookie Team.

Colton returned to the Catamounts for his sophomore season, where he skated in nearly all 37 games and posted career-highs in goals, power-play goals, and points. He recorded his first collegiate hat trick on October 7, 2017, in a 4–3 loss to Colorado College, becoming the first UVM player to do so since Jon Turk on October 11, 2014. As a result of his offensive output, Colton earned a Hockey East All-Star Honorable Mention.

During the 2018 offseason, Colton initially turned down a professional contract in order to return to the Catamounts for his junior season. However, he later concluded his collegiate career on June 26, 2018, by signing a two-year entry-level contract with the Lightning. He finished his tenure at Vermont with 28 goals and 50 points through 69 total games.

=== Professional ===
==== Tampa Bay Lightning ====
Upon concluding his collegiate career, Colton attended the Lightning's 2018 training camp before being assigned to their American Hockey League affiliate, the Syracuse Crunch for the 2018–19 season. He recorded his first professional career goal during a 6–3 loss to the Charlotte Checkers on October 27, 2018. As the season continued, Colton maintained a scoring streak of seven points within five games including his first career multi-goal game. He finished his rookie season ranked third on the team for goals with 14 and was fourth overall with 31 points.

Following his rookie season, Colton was invited to participate in the Lightning's training camp but was again returned to the Crunch for the 2019–20 season. Colton appeared in every game for the Crunch before the season was ultimately cancelled due to the COVID-19 pandemic, leading the team in assists and finishing second on the team in points scored. Once the league returned to play in January, Colton was re-called to the NHL level after playing in three AHL games. On February 24, 2021, Colton skated in his first career NHL game in a 3–0 Lightning win over the visiting Carolina Hurricanes at Amalie Arena. During the game, he recorded his first career NHL goal and point, becoming the ninth player in Lightning history to score a goal in their NHL debut. Colton also joined Nikita Kucherov as the only players in team history to record a game-winning goal in their first game. He remained with the team as they pushed to qualify for the 2021 Stanley Cup playoffs, while also recording nine goals and 12 points in 30 regular-season games.

As the Lightning qualified for the Stanley Cup playoffs, Colton made his postseason debut playing on their third and fourth line. He recorded his first post-season goal during Game 3 in an overtime loss to the Florida Panthers. Following this, he became a replacement for Barclay Goodrow on the Lightning's third line and scored the teams' sole goal in a 4–1 loss during Game 5. The Lightning eventually eliminated the Panthers from playoff contention and advanced to the Stanley Cup Second Round against the Hurricanes. While playing alongside Patrick Maroon and Tyler Johnson, he helped the team advance to the Stanley Cup semifinals by scoring a goal in a 2–0 win over the Hurricanes. On July 7, 2021, Colton scored the first goal of Game 5 that ended up being the winning goal of the 2021 Stanley Cup Finals, giving Tampa Bay their third Stanley Cup win in franchise history.

As a restricted free agent leading into the 2021–22 NHL season, Colton and the Lightning agreed to a two-year, $2.25 million contract extension on August 9, 2021. Solidifying his importance to the Lightning's depth scoring, Colton established new career marks in posting 22 goals, becoming the ninth player in Tampa Bay history to score 20 goals in his first or second NHL season. He added 17 assists for 39 points in his first full NHL season and appearing in 79 regular season games. In the post-season, Colton continued to elevate his game posting 9 points in 23 games, helping the Lightning reach the 2022 Stanley Cup Final for the third season in succession, before losing against the Colorado Avalanche.

In the 2022–23 season, Colton appeared in a career high 81 regular season games, adding 16 goals and 32 points for the Lightning. He notched 1 goal and 4 points in the playoffs in an opening round defeat to the Toronto Maple Leafs.

==== Colorado Avalanche ====
As a pending restricted free agent at the conclusion of his two year contract, Colton was traded by the Lightning to the Colorado Avalanche in exchange for a second-round selection prior to the 2023 NHL entry draft on June 28, 2023. While in contract negotiations with the Avalanche, Colton filed for salary arbitration on July 5, 2023. On July 17, 2023, Colton and the Avalanche avoided arbitration by agreeing to a four-year, $16 million contract.

Colton made his debut with the Avalanche on the opening night of the 2023–24 season, centering the third-line and registering an assist in a 5-1 victory over the Los Angeles Kings on October 11, 2023. Deployed in a top nine forward utility role, Colton made his 200th career NHL appearance on November 4, 2023, against the Vegas Golden Knights. He later recorded his 100th career NHL point, an assist on a Jonathan Drouin goal in a 5-4 overtime defeat to the Arizona Coyotes on December 27, 2023. He completed the regular season ranking second in team hits and notching 17 goals with a career best 23 assists and 40 points in 80 appearances. In the post-season, Colton skated in all 11 postseason contests for the Avalanche during the 2024 Stanley Cup Playoffs and recorded 1 goal and 4 points.

==== Nashville Predators ====
On June 16, 2026, Colton was traded to the Nashville Predators, alongside Isak Posch, in exchange for Magnus Chrona, a 2026 third-round pick, and a 2027 third-round pick.

== Career statistics ==
			Regular season					Playoffs
Season	Team	League	GP	G	A	Pts	PIM	GP	G	A	Pts	PIM
2014–15	Cedar Rapids RoughRiders	USHL	58	15	18	33	22	3	0	0	0	0
2015–16	Cedar Rapids RoughRiders	USHL	55	35	31	66	79	5	1	0	1	2
2016–17	University of Vermont	HE	33	12	15	27	22	—	—	—	—	—
2017–18	University of Vermont	HE	36	16	7	23	47	—	—	—	—	—
2018–19	Syracuse Crunch	AHL	66	14	17	31	36	4	1	0	1	2
2019–20	Syracuse Crunch	AHL	62	11	31	42	64	—	—	—	—	—
2020–21	Syracuse Crunch	AHL	3	1	2	3	0	—	—	—	—	—
2020–21	Tampa Bay Lightning	NHL	30	9	3	12	16	23	4	2	6	12
2021–22	Tampa Bay Lightning	NHL	79	22	17	39	24	23	5	4	9	13
2022–23	Tampa Bay Lightning	NHL	81	16	16	32	50	6	1	3	4	4
2023–24	Colorado Avalanche	NHL	80	17	23	40	61	11	1	3	4	2
2024–25	Colorado Avalanche	NHL	61	16	13	29	18	1	0	0	0	0
2025–26	Colorado Avalanche	NHL	73	9	15	24	13	11	2	3	5	16
NHL totals			404	89	87	176	182	75	13	15	28	47

== Awards and honors ==
Award	Year
NHL
Stanley Cup champion	2021
