= Erik Černák =

Slovak ice hockey player (born 1997)

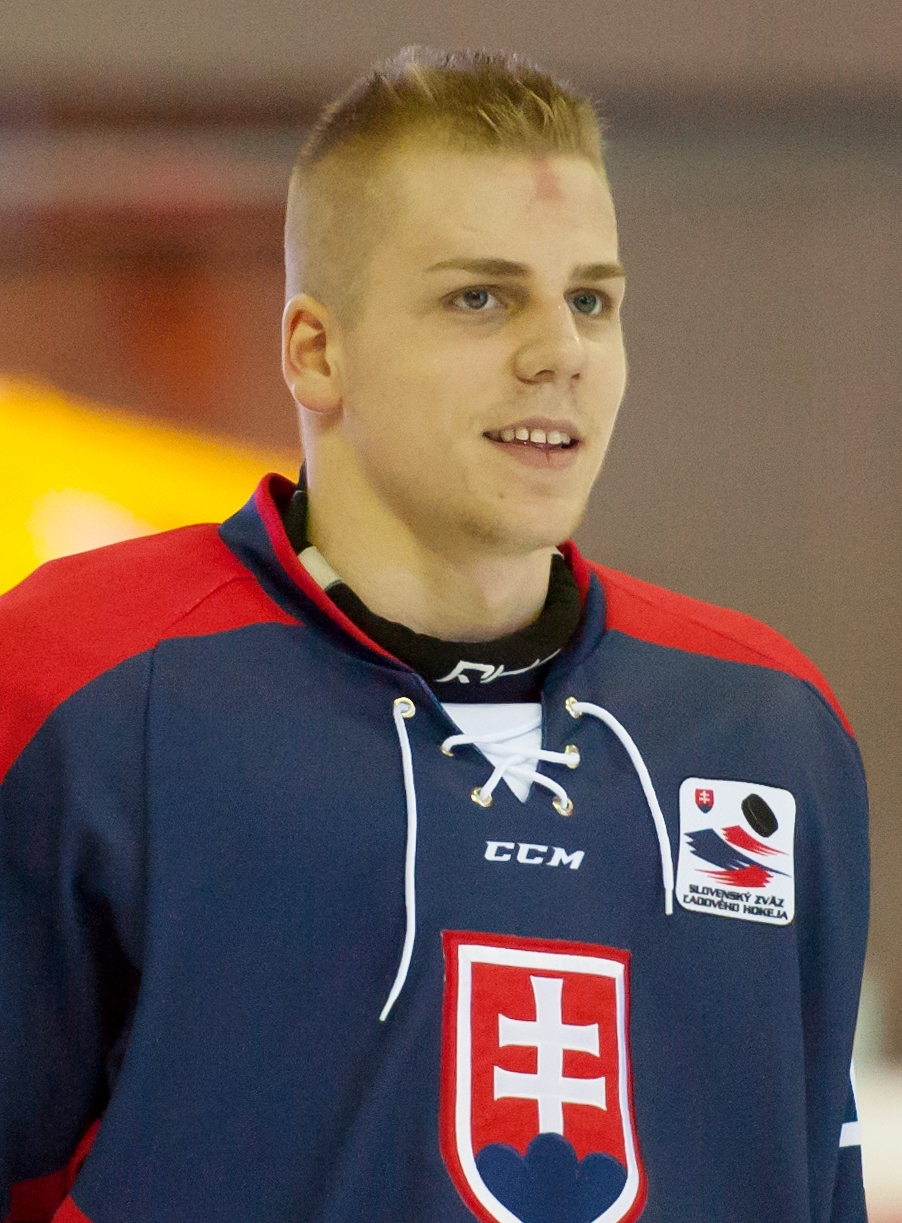
- Černák with Slovakia in 2015
- Born: 28 May 1997 (age 29) Košice, Slovakia
- Height: 6 ft 4 in (193 cm)
- Weight: 230 lb (104 kg; 16 st 6 lb)
- Position: Defence
- Shoots: Right
- NHL team Former teams: Tampa Bay Lightning; HC Košice
- National team: Slovakia
- NHL draft: 43rd overall, 2015; Los Angeles Kings
- Playing career: 2013–present

Erik Černák (born 28 May 1997) is a Slovak professional ice hockey player who is a defenceman for the Tampa Bay Lightning of the National Hockey League (NHL). He was selected by the Los Angeles Kings in the second round, 43rd overall, in the 2015 NHL entry draft. Černák won back-to-back Stanley Cup championships with the Lightning in 2020 and 2021.

== Playing career ==
Černák began his youth career with HC Košice before playing one season in the junior youth hockey team within the Slovan Bratislava system before returning to HC Košice's youth team on 11 June 2013. He made his senior professional debut with HC Košice in the 2013–14 season. He split the season between HC Košice and Orange 20, the Slovak national junior under-20 team.

After his second year with HC Košice in which he registered 5 goals and 13 points in 43 games, Černák's promising potential was recognized as he was ranked inside the top-twenty prospect skaters eligible for the 2015 NHL entry draft. He and goaltender Matej Tomek were the only Slovak prospects to partake in the NHL draft combine in Buffalo, New York, prior to the draft. On 14 July 2015, Černák signed a three-year, entry-level contract with the Los Angeles Kings of the National Hockey League.

After attending the Kings' 2016 training camp, Černák was reassigned to their American Hockey League (AHL) affiliate, the Ontario Reign, training camp. Despite an impressive play at the AHL level, he was returned to junior to play a second season with the Ontario Hockey League (OHL)'s Erie Otters for the 2016–17 season. On 26 February 2017, the Kings traded Černák with Peter Budaj and a 2017 seventh-round draft pick to the Tampa Bay Lightning for goaltender Ben Bishop and a 2017 fifth-round pick.

On 13 November 2018, Černák made his NHL debut in a 2–1 defeat to the Buffalo Sabres at the KeyBank Center. On 19 November, Černák recorded his first NHL point with an assist to Victor Hedman as the Lightning lost 3–2 to the Nashville Predators. On 2 February 2019, Černák recorded his first career NHL goal against the New York Rangers at Madison Square Garden. The goal came in a 3–2 Lightning win.

On 22 December 2020, Černák signed a three-year, $8.85 million contract with the Lightning.

On 13 July 2022, Černák signed an eight-year, $41.6 million contract extension with the Lightning.

== Personal life ==
Černák is a cousin of Christián Jaroš, who previously played in the NHL for the Ottawa Senators, San Jose Sharks and New Jersey Devils.

== Career statistics ==
=== Regular season and playoffs ===
			Regular season					Playoffs
Season	Team	League	GP	G	A	Pts	PIM	GP	G	A	Pts	PIM
2011–12	HC Košice	SVK U18	37	5	4	9	61	—	—	—	—	—
2012–13	HC Slovan Bratislava	SVK U18	1	0	2	2	0	1	0	2	2	0
2012–13	HC Slovan Bratislava	SVK U20	30	4	6	10	18	12	0	1	1	8
2012–13	HK Orange 20	Slovak.1	8	2	0	2	18	—	—	—	—	—
2013–14	HC Košice	SVK U20	8	1	3	4	16	—	—	—	—	—
2013–14	HC Košice	Slovak	13	0	0	0	0	7	0	0	0	2
2013–14	HK Orange 20	Slovak	20	2	1	3	2	—	—	—	—	—
2014–15	HC Košice	Slovak	43	5	8	13	16	7	0	1	1	6
2015–16	Erie Otters	OHL	41	4	11	15	35	13	0	6	6	10
2016–17	Erie Otters	OHL	50	3	18	21	53	22	1	8	9	10
2017–18	Syracuse Crunch	AHL	71	5	13	18	70	7	1	1	2	4
2018–19	Syracuse Crunch	AHL	9	2	5	7	14	—	—	—	—	—
2018–19	Tampa Bay Lightning	NHL	58	5	11	16	58	4	0	3	3	0
2019–20	Tampa Bay Lightning	NHL	67	5	7	12	59	25	0	4	4	12
2020–21	Tampa Bay Lightning	NHL	46	5	13	18	38	21	1	9	10	16
2021–22	Tampa Bay Lightning	NHL	54	1	12	13	46	23	1	1	2	12
2022–23	Tampa Bay Lightning	NHL	70	2	14	16	53	1	0	0	0	2
2023–24	Tampa Bay Lightning	NHL	69	2	11	13	63	5	0	1	1	2
2024–25	Tampa Bay Lightning	NHL	76	3	18	21	50	5	1	0	1	4
2025–26	Tampa Bay Lightning	NHL	61	3	8	11	74	7	0	1	1	2
NHL totals			502	26	94	120	441	91	3	19	22	50

Medal record

Representing Slovakia

Ice hockey

World Junior Championships
Bronze medal – third place	2015 Canada	

=== International ===
Year	Team	Event	Result	GP	G	A	Pts	PIM
2013	Slovakia	U17	10th	5	0	0	0	8
2013	Slovakia	WJC18	9th	6	0	2	2	8
2014	Slovakia	WJC	8th	5	0	0	0	4
2014	Slovakia	WJC18	8th	5	0	0	0	6
2015	Slovakia	WJC	3rd place, bronze medalist(s)	6	0	2	2	4
2016	Slovakia	WJC	7th	4	0	0	0	2
2017	Slovakia	WJC	8th	5	0	1	1	2
2019	Slovakia	WC	9th	7	3	2	5	8
2026	Slovakia	OG	4th	6	0	1	1	14
Junior totals				36	0	5	5	34
Senior totals				13	3	3	6	22

== Awards and honors ==
Award	Year
Slovakia
Champion	2014, 2015
NHL
Stanley Cup champion	2020, 2021
